= 2013 Night Train Tour =

2013 concert tour by Jason Aldean

- Tour by Jason Aldean
- Location: North America
- Associated album: Night Train
- Start date: February 21, 2013
- End date: October 26, 2013
- Legs: 2

Jason Aldean concert chronology
- My Kinda Party Tour (2011–12); 2013 Night Train Tour (2013); Burn It Down Tour (2014–15)

The 2013 Night Train Tour was the fifth headlining concert tour by American country music artist Jason Aldean, in support of his fifth studio album Night Train. It played at stadiums and arenas across North America.

== Background ==
Aldean held the first ever concert at Sanford Stadium on the campus of the University of Georgia on April 13, 2013.

On July 12, 2013, Aldean became the first country artist to ever headline Fenway Park. He sold out the historic park in seven minutes which is the quickest in the venue's history. Due to the quick sell-out he scheduled a second show for July 13, 2013.

== Opening acts ==
- Thomas Rhett (All Year)
- Jake Owen (All Year)
- Luke Bryan (Sanford Stadium)
- Miranda Lambert (Fenway Park)
- Kelly Clarkson (Wrigley Field)

== Setlist ==
The following set list is representative of the show on September 20, 2013. It is not representative of all concerts for the duration of the tour.

1. "Crazy Town"
2. "Take a Little Ride"
3. "Tattoos on This Town"
4. "When She Says Baby"
5. "The Truth"
6. "Fly Over States"
7. "Texas Was You"
8. "Johnny Cash"
9. "Amarillo Sky"
10. "Night Train
11. "1994"
12. "Don't You Wanna Stay"
13. "Tennessee River"
14. "Big Green Tractor"
15. "The Only Way I Know
16. "Dirt Road Anthem"
17. "She's Country"

Encore;
18. "My Kinda Party"
19. "Hicktown"

Notes:

- "Why" & "This Nothin Town" were also performed on select nights.
- During "Don't You Wanna Stay" Aldean sang with a Kelly Clarkson hologram except in Chicago when Clarkson was a special guest.
- On April 13, 2014, Ludacris performed "Dirt Road Anthem" with Aldean

== Tour DVD ==
A live concert DVD entitled 'Night Train to Georgia' was released on October 15, 2013. Majority of the film was captured during Aldean's concert at Sanford Stadium on April 13, 2013. The film will include an 18-song set list that showcases 10 of his No. one hits. Also featured on the 90 minute DVD are personal interviews from Aldean, footage from his record-breaking Fenway Park and Wrigley Field stadium shows held in Summer 2013. There are also appearances by Kelly Clarkson, Luke Bryan and Ludacris as each of them joined him on stage.

== Tour dates ==
Date	City	Country	Venue	Tickets sold / available	Gross revenue
February 21, 2013	Bossier City	United States	CenturyLink Center	12,028 / 12,028 (100%)	$566,107
February 22, 2013	Lafayette	United States	Cajundome	9,857 / 9,857 (100%)	$471,689
February 24, 2013	Biloxi	United States	Mississippi Coast Coliseum	9,416 / 9,416 (100%)	$460,027
February 28, 2013	Uncasville	United States	Mohegan Sun Arena	10,107 / 10,107 (100%)	$916,319
March 1, 2013	Uncasville	United States	Mohegan Sun Arena	10,107 / 10,107 (100%)	$916,319
March 2, 2013	New York City	United States	Madison Square Garden	12,026 / 12,026 (100%)	$843,880
March 11, 2013	Houston	United States	Reliant Stadium (Note: The concert in Houston was part of the Houston Livestock Show and Rodeo)	—	—
March 21, 2013	Madison	United States	Alliant Energy Center	8,297 / 8,297 (100%)	$348,518
March 22, 2013	Duluth	United States	AMSOIL Arena	6,338 / 6,338 (100%)	$327,393
March 23, 2013	Grand Forks	United States	Alerus Center	14,882 / 17,500 (85%)	$716,696
April 13, 2013	Athens	United States	Sanford Stadium	60,968 / 60,968 (100%)	$3,758,611
April 18, 2013	Charleston	United States	Charleston Civic Center	9,234 / 9,234 (100%)	$471,731
April 19, 2013	Louisville	United States	KFC Yum! Center	16,878 / 16,878 (100%)	$798,097
April 20, 2013	Knoxville	United States	Thompson–Boling Arena	14,741 / 14,741 (100%)	$696,276
April 25, 2013	Evansville	United States	Ford Center	9,363 / 9,363 (100%)	$427,857
April 26, 2013	Columbia	United States	Mizzou Arena	9,821 / 10,113 (97%)	$463,700
April 27, 2013	Omaha	United States	CenturyLink Center Omaha	14,444 / 14,444 (100%)	$704,323
May 3, 2013	Las Cruces	United States	Pan Am Center	9,078 / 9,078 (100%)	$437,574
May 4, 2013	Lubbock	United States	United Spirit Arena	10,232 / 10,232 (100%)	$511,316
May 5, 2013	Austin	United States	Austin360 Amphitheater	9,874 / 12,927 (76%)	$378,724
May 9, 2013	Wichita	United States	Intrust Bank Arena	10,032 / 14,249 (70%)	$456,432
May 10, 2013	Tulsa	United States	BOK Center	11,409 / 12,704 (90%)	$539,111
May 11, 2013	Little Rock	United States	Verizon Arena	13,139 / 14,746 (89%)	$536,678
May 16, 2013	Greenville	United States	Bi-Lo Center	10,409 / 10,409 (100%)	$534,566
May 17, 2013	North Charleston	United States	North Charleston Coliseum	8,560 / 8,560 (100%)	$427,981
May 18, 2013	Greensboro	United States	Greensboro Coliseum	13,149 / 13,149 (100%)	$668,383
June 28, 2013	Manhattan	United States	Tuttle Creek State Park (Note: The Concert in Manhattan, KS was part of the Kicker Country Stampede)	—	—
June 29, 2013	Milwaukee	United States	Marcus Amphitheater (Note: The Concert in Milwaukee was part of Summerfest)	—	—
July 11, 2013	Fort Loramie	United States	Hickory Hill Lakes (Note: The Concert in Fort Loramie was part of the Country Concert)	—	—
July 12, 2013	Boston	United States	Fenway Park	71,871 / 71,871 (100%)	$5,996,194
July 13, 2013	Boston	United States	Fenway Park	71,871 / 71,871 (100%)	$5,996,194
July 20, 2013	Chicago	United States	Wrigley Field	39,846 / 39,846 (100%)	$3,111,156
July 26, 2013	Cheyanne	United States	Frontier Days	—	—
July 27, 2013	Sandy	United States	Rio Tinto Stadium	—	—
July 28, 2013	Boise	United States	Taco Bell Arena	—	—
August 2, 2013	Bowmanville	Canada	Canadian Tire Motorsport Park (Note: The Concert in Bowmanville was part of the Boots and Hearts Country Music Festival)	—	—
August 9, 2013	Virginia Beach	United States	Farm Bureau Live at Virginia Beach	19,739 / 19,739 (100%)	$625,392
August 10, 2013	Hershey	United States	Hersheypark Stadium	21,853 / 21,853 (100%)	$706,479
August 11, 2013	Saratoga Springs	United States	Saratoga Performing Arts Center	18,898 / 25,289 (75%)	$695,306
August 15, 2013	Cincinnati	United States	Riverbend Music Center	20,424 / 20,424 (100%)	$667,590
August 16, 2013	Burgettstown	United States	First Niagara Pavilion	22,863 / 22,863 (100%)	$770,764
August 17, 2013	Darien	United States	Darien Lake PAC	21,640 / 21,640 (100%)	$815,441
August 23, 2013	Cuyahoga Falls	United States	Blossom Music Center	20,055 / 20,055 (100%)	$683,937
August 24, 2013	Camden	United States	Susquehanna Bank Center	24,947 / 24,947 (100%)	$881,618
August 25, 2013	Scranton	United States	Toyota Pavilion at Montage Mountain	13,791 / 17,389 (79%)	$447,836
September 5, 2013	Tallahassee	United States	Donald L. Tucker Center	7,318 / 8,076 (91%)	$341,814
September 6, 2013	Tampa	United States	MidFlorida Credit Union Amphitheatre	18,883 / 19,367 (98%)	$664,341
September 7, 2013	West Palm Beach	United States	Cruzan Amphitheatre	18,623 / 19,238 (97%)	$563,451
September 12, 2013	Charlotte	United States	Verizon Wireless Amphitheatre	—	$501,334
September 13, 2013	Raleigh	United States	Time Warner Cable Music Pavilion	19,921 / 19,921 (100%)	$659,658
September 14, 2013	Bristow	United States	Jiffy Lube Live	22,200 / 22,200 (100%)	$774,166
September 19, 2013	Lincoln	United States	Pinnacle Bank Arena	12,749 / 12,749 (100%)	$611,735
September 20, 2013	Maryland Heights	United States	Verizon Wireless Amphitheater	20,000 / 20,000 (100%)	$690,843
September 21, 2013	Noblesville	United States	Klipsch Music Center	24,814 / 24,814 (100%)	$783,417
September 25, 2013	Spokane	United States	Spokane Arena	10,135 / 10,700 (95%)	$508,271
September 26, 2013	Ridgefield	United States	Sleep Country Amphitheater	17,264 / 17,264 (100%)	$635,721
September 27, 2013	Tacoma	United States	Tacoma Dome	16,353 / 18,747 (87%)	$745,388
September 28, 2013	Vancouver	Canada	Rogers Arena	13,271 / 13,271 (100%)	$742,526
September 30, 2013	Dawson Creek	Canada	EnCana Events Centre	—	—
October 1, 2013	Dawson Creek	Canada	EnCana Events Centre	—	—
October 3, 2013	Saskatoon	Canada	Credit Union Centre	12,560 / 12,560 (100%)	$682,357
October 4, 2013	Edmonton	Canada	Rexall Place	12,638 / 12,638 (100%)	$701,058
October 5, 2013	Calgary	Canada	Scotiabank Saddledome	12,607 / 12,607 (100%)	$691,902
October 10, 2013	Fresno	United States	Save Mart Center	9,925 / 10,674 (93%)	$497,695
October 11, 2013	Wheatland	United States	Sleep Train Amphitheatre	18,500 / 18,500 (100%)	$640,937
October 12, 2013	Mountain View	United States	Shoreline Amphitheatre	22,021 / 22,021 (100%)	$727,610
October 17, 2013	Phoenix	United States	Desert Sky Pavilion	18,260 / 20,267 (90%)	$602,401
October 18, 2013	Chula Vista	United States	Sleep Train Amphitheatre	17,746 / 19,580 (91%)	$601,052
October 19, 2013	Los Angeles	United States	Hollywood Bowl	17,396 / 17,396 (100%)	$977,909
October 20, 2013	Las Vegas	United States	MGM Grand Garden Arena	8,698 / 10,673 (81%)	$549,130
October 24, 2013	Memphis	United States	FedEx Forum	9,844 / 12,435 (79%)	$414,276
October 25, 2013	New Orleans	United States	New Orleans Arena	13,367 / 13,367 (100%)	$641,401
TOTAL				1,003,040 / 1,041,203 (96%)	$47,814,095
