= Burn It Down Tour =

2014–15 concert tour by Jason Aldean

- Tour by Jason Aldean
- Promotional poster for the tour
- Location: North America
- Associated album: Night Train; Old Boots, New Dirt
- Start date: May 1, 2014
- End date: October 24, 2015
- Legs: 3
- No. of shows: 123
- Box office: US $58,825,500

Jason Aldean concert chronology
- 2013 Night Train Tour (2013); Burn It Down Tour (2014–15); We Were Here Tour (2016)

The Burn It Down Tour was a headlining concert tour by American country music singer Jason Aldean held in the United States between May 2014 and August 2015. It began on May 1, 2014 in Roanoke, Virginia. Venues included four Major League Baseball stadiums: Citizens Bank Park, PNC Park, Nationals Park, and Great American Ball Park. Supporting acts included Florida Georgia Line and Tyler Farr, and Miranda Lambert at select venues. In summer 2015, Aldean's tour merged with Kenny Chesney's The Big Revival Tour for ten stadium shows. The "Burn It Down Tour" has played to over one million people.

== Concert synopsis ==
Aldean plays a good mix of songs from all six of his albums, with most being from Old Boots, New Dirt, and covers as well during the show. Periodically Aldean would go out towards the crowd and perform from there.

== Set list ==
1. "Hicktown"
2. "My Kinda Party"
3. "Tattoos on This Town"
4. "Amarillo Sky"
5. "Big Green Tractor"
6. "Johnny Cash"
7. "The Truth"
8. "Take a Little Ride"
9. "Fly Over States"
10. "When She Says Baby"
11. "1994"
12. "Night Train"
13. "Don't You Wanna Stay" (with Kelly Clarkson video hologram)
14. "The Only Way I Know" (with Florida Georgia Line)
15. "Heaven" (Bryan Adams cover)
16. "Dirt Road Anthem"
17. "Crazy Town"

Encore

18. "She's Country"

== Tour dates ==
List of concerts, showing date, city, country, venue, opening acts, tickets sold, attendance and gross revenue
Date	City	Country	Venues	Opening acts(s)	Attendance	Revenue
North America leg 1
May 1, 2014	Roanoke	United States	Roanoke Civic Center	Florida Georgia Line; Tyler Farr	7,536 / 7,536	$409,887
May 2, 2014	State College	United States	Bryce Jordan Center	Florida Georgia Line; Tyler Farr	10,785 / 10,785	$595,876
May 3, 2014	Atlantic City	United States	Boardwalk Hall	Florida Georgia Line; Tyler Farr	12,569 / 12,569	$697,957
May 9, 2014	Pelham	United States	Oak Mountain Amphitheatre	Florida Georgia Line; Tyler Farr	19,290 / 20,580	$828,151
May 10, 2014	Pelham	United States	Oak Mountain Amphitheatre	Florida Georgia Line; Tyler Farr	19,290 / 20,580	$828,151
May 15, 2014	Atlanta	United States	Aaron's Amphitheatre	Florida Georgia Line; Tyler Farr	46,947 / 56,377	$1,449,826
May 16, 2014	Atlanta	United States	Aaron's Amphitheatre	Florida Georgia Line; Tyler Farr	46,947 / 56,377	$1,449,826
May 17, 2014	Atlanta	United States	Aaron's Amphitheatre	Florida Georgia Line; Tyler Farr	46,947 / 56,377	$1,449,826
May 25, 2014	Baton Rouge	United States	Tiger Stadium	Florida Georgia Line; Tyler Farr	—	—
June 14, 2014	Jacksonville	United States	EverBank Field	Florida Georgia Line; Tyler Farr	—	—
July 11, 2014	Mansfield	United States	Xfinity Center	Florida Georgia Line; Tyler Farr	19,900 / 19,900	$835,334
July 12, 2014	Darien Center	United States	Darien Lake Performing Arts Center	Florida Georgia Line; Tyler Farr	21,553 / 21,553	$807,920
July 18, 2014	Cleveland	United States	Progressive Field	Miranda Lambert; Florida Georgia Line; Tyler Farr	40,516 / 40,516	$2,709,017
July 19, 2014	Cincinnati	United States	Great American Ball Park	Miranda Lambert; Florida Georgia Line; Tyler Farr	39,196 / 39,196	$2,632,614
July 25, 2014	Washington, D.C.	United States	Nationals Park	Florida Georgia Line; Tyler Farr	32,263 / 36,948	$2,188,891
July 26, 2014	Pittsburgh	United States	PNC Park	Miranda Lambert; Florida Georgia Line; Tyler Farr	38,985 / 39,548	$2,898,350
July 27, 2014	Twin Lakes	United States	Country Thunder	Florida Georgia Line; Tyler Farr	—	—
August 1, 2014	Philadelphia	United States	Citizens Bank Park	Florida Georgia Line; Tyler Farr	38,725 / 38,725	$2,484,731
August 2, 2014	Hartford	United States	Xfinity Theatre	Florida Georgia Line; Tyler Farr	24,053 / 24,053	$774,195
August 7, 2014	Detroit Lakes	United States	WE Fest	Florida Georgia Line; Tyler Farr	—	—
August 8, 2014	Prairie du Chien	United States	Country on the River	Florida Georgia Line; Tyler Farr	—	—
August 9, 2014	Tinley Park	United States	First Midwest Bank Amphitheatre	Florida Georgia Line; Tyler Farr	28,380 / 28,380	$942,155
August 22, 2014	Maryland Heights	United States	Verizon Wireless Amphitheater	Florida Georgia Line; Tyler Farr	39,014 / 40,000	$1,312,015
August 23, 2014	Maryland Heights	United States	Verizon Wireless Amphitheater	Florida Georgia Line; Tyler Farr	39,014 / 40,000	$1,312,015
August 28, 2014	Toronto	Canada	Molson Canadian Amphitheatre	Florida Georgia Line; Tyler Farr	15,707 / 15,707	$706,358
August 29, 2014	Saratoga Springs	United States	Saratoga Performing Arts Center	Florida Georgia Line; Tyler Farr	22,168 / 25,121	$788,485
August 30, 2014 ^{[B]}	Syracuse	United States	New York State Fair	Florida Georgia Line; Tyler Farr	17,505 / 17,505	$1,111,393
August 31, 2014	Bangor	United States	Darling's Waterfront Pavilion	Florida Georgia Line; Tyler Farr	13,050 / 13,050	$701,568
September 5, 2014	Charlotte	United States	PNC Music Pavilion	Florida Georgia Line; Tyler Farr	18,860 / 18,860	$669,793
September 6, 2014	Raleigh	United States	Walnut Creek Amphitheatre	Florida Georgia Line; Tyler Farr	20,040 / 20,040	$668,731
September 7, 2014	Virginia Beach	United States	Farm Bureau Live	Florida Georgia Line; Tyler Farr	20,016 / 20,016	$660,067
September 12, 2014	Knoxville	United States	Thompson–Boling Arena	Florida Georgia Line; Tyler Farr	14,217 / 14,217	$658,536
September 13, 2014	Lexington	United States	Rupp Arena	Florida Georgia Line; Tyler Farr	18,165 / 18,165	$736,563
September 14, 2014	Columbus	United States	Crew Stadium	Florida Georgia Line; Tyler Farr	26,350 / 26,350	$1,370,903
September 17, 2014	Morrison	United States	Red Rocks Amphitheatre	Florida Georgia Line; Tyler Farr	19,050 / 19,050	$1,117,812
September 18, 2014	Morrison	United States	Red Rocks Amphitheatre	Florida Georgia Line; Tyler Farr	19,050 / 19,050	$1,117,812
September 19, 2014	Albuquerque	United States	Isleta Amphitheater	Florida Georgia Line; Tyler Farr	15,260 / 15,260	$543,785
September 20, 2014	Phoenix	United States	Ak-Chin Pavilion	Florida Georgia Line; Tyler Farr	20,266 / 20,266	$722,567
September 25, 2014	Chula Vista	United States	Sleep Train Amphitheatre	Florida Georgia Line; Tyler Farr	18,220 / 19,350	$625,428
September 26, 2014	Irvine	United States	Verizon Wireless Amphitheatre	Florida Georgia Line; Tyler Farr	14,949 / 14,949	$589,163
September 27, 2014	Mountain View	United States	Shoreline Amphitheatre	Florida Georgia Line; Tyler Farr	22,012 / 22,012	$724,150
September 28, 2014	Wheatland	United States	Sleep Train Amphitheatre	Florida Georgia Line; Tyler Farr	18,670 / 18,670	$659,514
October 2, 2014	Winnipeg	Canada	MTS Centre	Florida Georgia Line; Tyler Farr	11,578 / 11,578	$678,441
October 3, 2014	Sioux Falls	United States	Denny Sanford Premier Center	Florida Georgia Line; Tyler Farr	10,471 / 10,471	$568,305
October 9, 2014	Erie	United States	Erie Insurance Arena	Florida Georgia Line; Tyler Farr	7,229 / 7,229	$389,833
October 10, 2014	Auburn Hills	United States	The Palace of Auburn Hills	Florida Georgia Line; Tyler Farr	28,731 / 28,731	$1,569,971
October 11, 2014	Auburn Hills	United States	The Palace of Auburn Hills	Florida Georgia Line; Tyler Farr	28,731 / 28,731	$1,569,971
October 16, 2014	Gainesville	United States	O'Connell Center	Florida Georgia Line; Tyler Farr	7,500 / 7,500	$405,192
October 17, 2014	Tampa	United States	MidFlorida Credit Union Amphitheatre	Florida Georgia Line; Tyler Farr	19,437 / 19,437	$764,645
October 18, 2014	West Palm Beach	United States	Cruzan Amphitheatre	Florida Georgia Line; Tyler Farr	19,564 / 19,564	$664,592
October 23, 2014	The Woodlands	United States	Cynthia Woods Mitchell Pavilion	Florida Georgia Line; Tyler Farr	16,401 / 16,401	$646,603
October 24, 2014	San Antonio	United States	AT&T Center	Florida Georgia Line; Tyler Farr	13,239 / 13,239	$662,498
October 25, 2014	Dallas	United States	Gexa Energy Pavilion	Florida Georgia Line; Tyler Farr	19,879 / 19,879	$692,327
North America leg 2
January 31, 2015	Phoenix	United States	US Airways Center	Dierks Bentley; Florida Georgia Line; Dee Jay Silver	—	—
February 12, 2015	Greenville	United States	Bon Secours Wellness Arena	Tyler Farr; Cole Swindell	10,093 / 10,093	$561,730
February 13, 2015	Greensboro	United States	Greensboro Coliseum	Tyler Farr; Cole Swindell	13,483 / 13,483	$647,815
February 14, 2015	North Charleston	United States	North Charleston Coliseum	Tyler Farr; Cole Swindell	8,458 / 8,458	$481,868
February 19, 2015	Bossier City	United States	CenturyLink Center	Tyler Farr; Cole Swindell	10,607 / 11,601	$571,474
February 20, 2015	Tupelo	United States	BancorpSouth Arena	Tyler Farr; Cole Swindell	8,883 / 8,883	$488,513
February 21, 2015	Nashville	United States	Bridgestone Arena	Tyler Farr; Cole Swindell	13,616 / 13,616	$709,934
March 26, 2015	Toledo	United States	Huntington Center	Tyler Farr; Cole Swindell	7,693 / 7,693	$435,648
March 27, 2015	Peoria	United States	Peoria Civic Center	Tyler Farr; Cole Swindell	9,020 / 9,020	$482,696
March 28, 2015	Cedar Falls	United States	UNI-Dome	Tyler Farr; Cole Swindell	12,780 / 12,780	$650,366
April 9, 2015	Wichita	United States	Intrust Bank Arena	Tyler Farr; Cole Swindell	7,937 / 10,658	$452,858
April 10, 2015	Tulsa	United States	BOK Center	Tyler Farr; Cole Swindell	9,007 / 9,007	$506,985
April 11, 2015	North Little Rock	United States	Verizon Arena	Tyler Farr; Cole Swindell	—	—
April 22, 2015	Bozeman	United States	Brick Breeden Fieldhouse	Tyler Farr; Cole Swindell	13,970 / 16,143	$722,175
April 23, 2015	Bozeman	United States	Brick Breeden Fieldhouse	Tyler Farr; Cole Swindell	13,970 / 16,143	$722,175
April 24, 2015	Spokane	United States	Spokane Arena	Tyler Farr; Cole Swindell	10,981 / 10,981	$588,655
April 25, 2015	Eugene	United States	Matthew Knight Arena	Tyler Farr; Cole Swindell	8,811 / 8,811	$476,920
May 7, 2015	Grand Rapids	United States	Van Andel Arena	Tyler Farr; Cole Swindell	10,323 / 10,323	$570,999
May 8, 2015	Louisville	United States	KFC Yum! Center	Tyler Farr; Cole Swindell	12,267 / 12,267	$606,227
May 9, 2015	Fort Wayne	United States	Allen County War Memorial Coliseum	Tyler Farr; Cole Swindell	8,820 / 8,820	$475,725
May 14, 2015	Corpus Christi	United States	American Bank Center	Tyler Farr; Cole Swindell	7,316 / 7,316	$397,443
May 15, 2015	Beaumont	United States	Ford Arena	Tyler Farr; Cole Swindell	9,816 / 12,474	$399,401
May 28, 2015	Charleston	United States	Charleston Civic Center	Tyler Farr; Cole Swindell	8,223 / 8,223	$441,477
May 29, 2015	Hartford	United States	Xfinity Theatre	Tyler Farr; Cole Swindell	22,436 / 23,951	$749,154
May 30, 2015	Hershey	United States	Hersheypark Stadium	Tyler Farr; Cole Swindell	22,377 / 28,729	$866,693
July 9, 2015	Ottawa	Canada	RBC Royal Bank Bluesfest	—	—	—
July 11, 2015	Calgary	Canada	Scotiabank Saddledome	Tyler Farr; Cole Swindell; Dee Jay Silver	13,386 / 13,386	$1,377,220
July 12, 2015	Craven	Canada	Craven County Jamboree	—	—	—
July 17, 2015	Tinley Park	United States	Hollywood Casino Amphitheatre	Tyler Farr; Cole Swindell; Dee Jay Silver	23,315 / 28,109	$790,205
July 24, 2015	Paso Robles	United States	California Mid State Fair	—	14,337 / 14,337	$725,260
August 13, 2015	Darien	United States	Darien Lake PAC	Tyler Farr; Cole Swindell; Dee Jay Silver	14,342 / 18,647	$533,722
August 14, 2015	Harrington	United States	Delaware Junction Festival	—	—	—
August 21, 2015	Noblesville	United States	Klipsch Music Center	Cole Swindell; Tyler Farr; Dee Jay Silver	24,417 / 24,417	$796,651
August 22, 2015	Maryland Heights	United States	Hollywood Casino Amphhitheatre	Cole Swindell; Tyler Farr; Dee Jay Silver	15,538 / 19,462	$532,412
August 23, 2015	Cincinnati	United States	Riverbend Music Center	Cole Swindell; Tyler Farr; Dee Jay Silver	20,316 / 20,316	$696,911
September 3, 2015	Virginia Beach	United States	Farm Bureau Live	Cole Swindell; Tyler Farr; Dee Jay Silver	12,866 / 17,473	$414,757
September 4, 2015	Charlotte	United States	PNC Music Pavilion	Cole Swindell; Tyler Farr; Dee Jay Silver	13,917 / 18,307	$446,716
September 5, 2015	Raleigh	United States	Walnut Creek Amphitheatre	Cole Swindell; Tyler Farr; Dee Jay Silver	18,528 / 19,689	$584,942
September 10, 2015	Scranton	United States	The Pavilion	Cole Swindell; Tyler Farr; Dee Jay Silver	11,598 / 15,468	$347,183
September 11, 2015	Burgettstown	United States	First Niagara Pavilion	Cole Swindell; Tyler Farr; Dee Jay Silver	19,148 /22,653	$589,698
September 12, 2015	Bristow	United States	Jiffy Lube Live	Cole Swindell; Tyler Farr; Dee Jay Silver	18,191 / 22,095	$647,820
September 17, 2015	Toronto	Canada	Molson Canadian Amphitheatre	Cole Swindell; Tyler Farr; Dee Jay Silver	14,340 / 15,636	$535,577
September 18, 2015	Clarkston	United States	DTE Energy Music Theatre	Cole Swindell; Tyler Farr; Dee Jay Silver	15,173 / 15,173	$612,086
September 19, 2015	Cuyahoga Falls	United States	Blossom Music Center	Cole Swindell; Tyler Farr; Dee Jay Silver	20,188 / 20,489	$809,031
September 24, 2015	Lubbock	United States	United Supermarkets Arena	Cole Swindell; Tyler Farr; Dee Jay Silver	6,752 / 8,214	$340,472
September 25, 2015	Las Cruces	United States	Pan American Center	Cole Swindell; Tyler Farr; Dee Jay Silver	8,285 / 8,285	$459,918
September 26, 2015	Phoenix	United States	Ak-Chin Pavilion	Cole Swindell; Tyler Farr; Dee Jay Silver	16,242 / 20,180	$585,794
October 2, 2015	Vancouver	Canada	Rogers Arena	Cole Swindell; Tyler Farr	9,386 / 11,452	$437,474
October 3, 2015	Kelowna	Canada	Prospera Place	Cole Swindell; Tyler Farr	5,260 / 5,260	$304,202
October 5, 2015	Kamloops	Canada	Interior Savings Centre	Cole Swindell; Tyler Farr	4,052 / 4,502	$229,632
October 6, 2015	Prince George	Canada	CN Centre	Cole Swindell; Tyler Farr	4,438 / 4,936	$251,646
October 8, 2015	Red Deer	Canada	Enmax Centrium	Cole Swindell; Tyler Farr	5,356 / 6,124	$305,416
October 9, 2015	Edmonton	Canada	Rexall Place	Cole Swindell; Tyler Farr	9,516 / 15,378	$564,828
October 12, 2015	Medicine Hat	Canada	Medicine Hat Regional Event Centre	Cole Swindell; Tyler Farr	—	—
October 14, 2015	Saskatoon	Canada	SaskTel Centre	Cole Swindell; Tyler Farr	7,458 / 8,004	$341,580
October 22, 2015	Jacksonville	United States	Jacksonville Veterans Memorial Arena	Cole Swindell; Tyler Farr; Dee Jay Silver	8,781 / 8,781	$438,869
October 23, 2015	Tampa	United States	MidFlorida Credit Union Amphitheatre	Cole Swindell; Tyler Farr; Dee Jay Silver	18,215 / 18,215	$711,698
October 24, 2015	West Palm Beach	United States	Perfect Vodka Amphitheatre	Cole Swindell; Tyler Farr; Dee Jay Silver	18,843 / 18,843	$603,775
Total					1,527,347 / 1,612,506	$69,334,255
The Big Revival/Burn It Down Stadium Tour
May 2, 2015	Santa Clara	United States	Levi's Stadium	Jake Owen; Cole Swindell; Dee Jay Silver	46,549 /47,498	$4,765,582
May 16, 2015	Arlington	United States	AT&T Stadium	Brantley Gilbert; Cole Swindell; Old Dominion	47,256 / 47,256	$4,210,345
June 20, 2015	Green Bay	United States	Lambeau Field	Brantley Gilbert; Cole Swindell; Old Dominion	53,363 / 53,363	$5,867,106
June 27, 2015	Seattle	United States	CenturyLink Field	Brantley Gilbert; Cole Swindell; Old Dominion	49,680 / 51,610	$4,428,366
July 18, 2015	Minneapolis	United States	Target Field	Brantley Gilbert; Cole Swindell; Old Dominion	84,479 / 84,479	$7,816,355
July 19, 2015	Minneapolis	United States	Target Field	Brantley Gilbert; Cole Swindell; Old Dominion	84,479 / 84,479	$7,816,355
July 25, 2015	Pasadena	United States	Rose Bowl	Brantley Gilbert; Cole Swindell; Old Dominion	53,864 / 53,864	$4,297,535
August 1, 2015	Kansas City	United States	Arrowhead Stadium	Brantley Gilbert; Cole Swindell; Old Dominion	57,368 / 57,368	$5,394,025
August 8, 2015	Denver	United States	Sports Authority Field	Brantley Gilbert; Cole Swindell; Old Dominion	54,674 / 54,674	$5,279,591
August 15, 2015	East Rutherford	United States	MetLife Stadium	Brantley Gilbert; Cole Swindell; Old Dominion	58,642 / 58,642	$6,067,017
August 28, 2015	Foxborough	United States	Gillette Stadium	Brantley Gilbert; Cole Swindell; Old Dominion	120,206 / 120,206	$11,624,917
August 29, 2015	Foxborough	United States	Gillette Stadium	Brantley Gilbert; Cole Swindell; Old Dominion	120,206 / 120,206	$11,624,917
Total					626,081 / 628,960	$59,750,839

== Critical reception ==
Jerry Wofford of Tulsa World says that Aldean "started off strong, with lots of fire and pyrotechnics". The show went on to say that the show had a rock concert vibe and only Aldean's voice and the slide guitar were the only hits of a traditional country show. He did a good job with "mixing his sound and styles throughout his set, and a good job of mixing in songs from each of his six albums". Wofford went on to say that "Aldean knows how to put on a huge show."
