= We Were Here Tour =

2016 concert tour by Jason Aldean

We Were Here/Six String Circus Tour
- Tour by Jason Aldean
- Promotional poster for the tour
- Location: North America; Australia
- Associated album: Old Boots, New Dirt
- Start date: January 14, 2016
- End date: October 1, 2016
- Legs: 3
- No. of shows: 55 in North America; 3 in Australia; 58 total
- Box office: $25,859,760

Jason Aldean concert chronology
- Burn It Down Tour (2014–15); We Were Here/Six String Circus Tour (2016); They Don't Know Tour (2017)

The We Were Here / Six String Circus Tour was the sixth headlining concert tour by American country music artist Jason Aldean, in support of his sixth studio album Old Boots, New Dirt. It began on January 14, 2016 in Evansville, Indiana and ended on October 1, 2016 in Bristow, Virginia. In May 2016, the tour had its name changed to the Six String Circus Tour.

== Background ==
The tour was first announced on October 16, 2015 though Aldean's website. Aldean will tour Australia for the first time in his career. Summer 2016 dates were announced in April 2016, and the show at Fenway Park will be co-headlined with Kid Rock. Kid Rock stole the show after going on tirade on San Francisco back up QB Colin Kaepernick during Born Free.The video has been viewed over 2 million times on YouTube and got national attention.

== Opening acts ==
- A Thousand Horses
- Thomas Rhett

== Setlist ==
1. "Just Gettin' Started"
2. "Gonna Know We Were Here"
3. "Take a Little Ride"
4. "When She Says Baby"
5. "Night Train"
6. "Big Green Tractor"
7. "Tattoos on This Town"
8. "Fly Over States"
9. "Tonight Looks Good On You"
10. Medley: "Asphalt Cowboy"/"Why"/"The Truth"/"Don't You Wanna Stay"
11. "The Only Way I Know"
12. "1994"
13. "Johnny Cash"
14. "Amarillo Sky"
15. "My Kinda Party"
16. "She's Country"
17. "Dirt Road Anthem"
18. "Hicktown"

Encore 1

19. "Burnin' It Down"

Encore 2

20. "Crazy Town"

== Tour dates ==
List of concerts, showing date, city, country, venue, opening acts, tickets sold, number of available tickets, and gross revenue
Date	City	Country	Venue	Opening acts	Attendance	Revenue
North America Leg 1
January 14, 2016	Moline	United States	iWireless Center	Thomas Rhett; A Thousand Horses	8,470 / 10,424	$440,145
January 15, 2016	Evansville	United States	Ford Center	Thomas Rhett; A Thousand Horses	9,124 / 9,124	$504,248
January 16, 2016	Bloomington	United States	U.S. Cellular Coliseum	Thomas Rhett; A Thousand Horses	11,587 / 12,634	$593,046
January 17, 2016	Bloomington	United States	U.S. Cellular Coliseum	Thomas Rhett; A Thousand Horses	11,587 / 12,634	$593,046
January 21, 2016	Des Moines	United States	Wells Fargo Arena	Thomas Rhett; A Thousand Horses	11,111 / 14,041	$618,663
January 22, 2016	Omaha	United States	CenturyLink Center	Thomas Rhett; A Thousand Horses	12,717 / 13,767	$694,944
January 23, 2016	Springfield	United States	JQH Arena	Thomas Rhett; A Thousand Horses	8,262 / 8,262	$478,216
January 28, 2016	Grand Forks	United States	Alerus Center	Thomas Rhett; A Thousand Horses	10,423 / 13,321	$463,951
January 29, 2016	Bismarck	United States	Bismarck Events Center	Thomas Rhett; A Thousand Horses	7,196 / 7,196	$469,124
January 30, 2016	Sioux Falls	United States	Denny Sanford Premier Center	Thomas Rhett; A Thousand Horses	10,656 / 10,656	$608,123
February 4, 2016	Southaven	United States	Landers Center	Thomas Rhett; A Thousand Horses	8,249 / 8,249	$441,791
February 5, 2016	Oklahoma City	United States	Chesapeake Energy Arena	Thomas Rhett; A Thousand Horses	9,170 / 11,576	$472,788
February 6, 2016	Columbia	United States	Mizzou Arena	Thomas Rhett; A Thousand Horses	8,809 / 8,809	$467,233
February 18, 2016	Roanoke	United States	Roanoke Civic Center	Thomas Rhett; A Thousand Horses	6,574 / 7,214	$355,115
February 19, 2016	Charlottesville	United States	John Paul Jones Arena	Thomas Rhett; A Thousand Horses	9,513 / 13,173	$454,506
February 20, 2016	Fayetteville	United States	Cumberland County Crown Coliseum	Thomas Rhett; A Thousand Horses	8,485 / 8,485	$417,054
February 25, 2016	Manchester	United States	Verizon Wireless Arena	Thomas Rhett; A Thousand Horses	8,914 / 8,926	$503,252
February 26, 2016	University Park	United States	Bryce Jordan Center	Thomas Rhett; A Thousand Horses	11,041 / 11,041	$574,669
February 27, 2016	Atlantic City	United States	Boardwalk Hall	Thomas Rhett; A Thousand Horses	12,543 / 12,543	$778,363
Oceania
March 8, 2016	Melbourne	Australia	Margaret Court Arena	Florida Georgia Line	4,852 / 6,700	$459,234
March 9, 2016	Sydney	Australia	Hordern Pavilion	Florida Georgia Line	5,202 / 5,537	$388,680
March 12, 2016	Ipswich	Australia	Willowbank Raceway	—	—	—
North America Leg 2 (Six String Circus Tour starting from Rogers, AR)
April 28, 2016	Portland	United States	Cross Insurance Arena	Thomas Rhett; A Thousand Horses	—	—
April 29, 2016	Uncasville	United States	Mohegan Sun Arena	Thomas Rhett; A Thousand Horses	10,524 / 10,524	$1,044,316
April 30, 2016	Uncasville	United States	Mohegan Sun Arena	Thomas Rhett; A Thousand Horses	10,524 / 10,524	$1,044,316
May 5, 2016	Erie	United States	Erie Insurance Arena	Thomas Rhett; A Thousand Horses	6,201 / 6,201	$376,045
May 6, 2016	Allentown	United States	PPL Center	Thomas Rhett; A Thousand Horses	8,516 / 8,516	$532,391
May 7, 2016	Columbia	United States	Merriweather Post Pavilion	Thomas Rhett; A Thousand Horses	14,307 / 16,772	$846,010
May 12, 2016	Oshawa	Canada	General Motors Centre	Thomas Rhett; A Thousand Horses	5,292 / 5,292	$305,988
May 13, 2016	Kingston	Canada	K-Rock Centre	Thomas Rhett; A Thousand Horses	4,837 / 4,837	$322,239
May 14, 2016	London	Canada	Budweiser Gardens	Thomas Rhett; A Thousand Horses	9,047 / 9,047	$505,445
May 19, 2016	Rogers	United States	Walmart Arkansas Music Pavilion	Thomas Rhett; A Thousand Horses	9,493 / 9,493	$439,134
May 20, 2016	Bonner Springs	United States	Providence Medical Center Amphitheater	Thomas Rhett; A Thousand Horses	11,974 / 16,750	$424,289
May 21, 2016	Dallas	United States	Gexa Energy Pavilion	Thomas Rhett; A Thousand Horses	18,919 / 18,919	$646,697
June 17, 2016	Wantagh	United States	Nikon at Jones Beach Theatre	Thomas Rhett; A Thousand Horses	—	—
June 24, 2016	West Valley City	United States	USANA Amphitheatre	Thomas Rhett; A Thousand Horses	19,978 / 19,978	$830,760
June 26, 2016	Albuquerque	United States	Isleta Amphitheater	Thomas Rhett; A Thousand Horses	—	—
July 14, 2016	Bethel	United States	Bethel Woods Center for the Arts	Thomas Rhett; A Thousand Horses	—	—
July 15, 2016	Syracuse	United States	Lakeview Amphitheater	Thomas Rhett; A Thousand Horses	—	—
July 21, 2016	Noblesville**	United States	Klipsch Music Center	Thomas Rhett; A Thousand Horses	24,447 / 24,447	$818,414
July 22, 2016	Maryland Heights	United States	Hollywood Casino Amphitheatre	Thomas Rhett; A Thousand Horses	—	—
August 12, 2016	Phoenix	United States	Ak-Chin Pavilion	Thomas Rhett; A Thousand Horses	—	—
August 13, 2016	Chula Vista	United States	Sleep Train Amphitheatre	Thomas Rhett; A Thousand Horses	—	—
August 14, 2016	San Bernardino	United States	San Manuel Amphitheater	Thomas Rhett; A Thousand Horses	20,918 / 23,646	$789,871
August 18, 2016	Wheatlan	United States	Toyota Amphitheatre	Thomas Rhett; A Thousand Horses	—	—
August 19, 2016	Mountain View	United States	Shoreline Amphitheater	Thomas Rhett; A Thousand Horses	—	—
August 20, 2016	Irvine	United States	Irvine Meadows Amphitheatre	Thomas Rhett; A Thousand Horses	—	—
September 9, 2016 (Note: Boston show co-headlined with Kid Rock.)	Boston**	United States	Fenway Park	Kid Rock; Thomas Rhett; A Thousand Horses	63,713 / 72,096	$6,063,433
September 11, 2016	Hartford	United States	Xfinity Theatre	Thomas Rhett; A Thousand Horses	—	—
September 15, 2016	Hershey	United States	Hersheypark Stadium	Thomas Rhett; A Thousand Horses	—	—
September 16, 2016	Virginia Beach	United States	Veterans United Home Loans Amphitheater	Thomas Rhett; A Thousand Horses	—	—
September 17, 2016	Camden**	United States	BB&T Pavilion	Thomas Rhett; A Thousand Horses	24,258 / 24,258	$837,982
September 22, 2016	Darien Center	United States	Darien Lake PAC	Thomas Rhett; A Thousand Horses	—	—
September 23, 2016	Cuyahoga Falls	United States	Blossom Music Center	Thomas Rhett; A Thousand Horses	—	—
September 24, 2016	Burgettstown	United States	First Niagara Pavilion	Thomas Rhett; A Thousand Horses	—	—
September 29, 2016	Charlotte	United States	PNC Music Pavilion	Thomas Rhett; A Thousand Horses	—	—
September 30, 2016	Raleigh	United States	Coastal Credit Union Music Park	Thomas Rhett; A Thousand Horses	—	—
October 1, 2016	Bristow**	United States	Jiffy Lube Live	Thomas Rhett; A Thousand Horses	22,461 / 22,461	$866,601
Total					457,783 / 494,915	$25,859,760
