= 2013 CMT Music Awards =

Annual US country music awards ceremony

- Date: June 5, 2013
- Location: Bridgestone Arena, Nashville, Tennessee
- Hosted by: Jason Aldean; Kristen Bell
- Most wins: Florida Georgia Line; Miranda Lambert; (2 each)
- Most nominations: Luke Bryan; Florida Georgia Line; Miranda Lambert; (3 each)

Television/radio coverage
- Network: CMT

The 2013 CMT Music Awards is a music award ceremony that was held on Wednesday, June 5, 2013 at the Bridgestone Arena in Nashville, Tennessee. CMT. The show was hosted by CMT Award winner Jason Aldean and Kristen Bell.

== Winners and nominees ==
The winners are highlighted in bold.

Video of the Year	Female Video of the Year
**Carrie Underwood** — "**Blown Away**"; Jason Aldean — "1994"; Luke Bryan — "Kiss Tomorrow Goodbye"; Florida Georgia Line — "Cruise"; Miranda Lambert — "Mama's Broken Heart"; Taylor Swift — "We Are Never Ever Getting Back Together"	**Miranda Lambert** — "**Mama's Broken Heart**"; Faith Hill — "American Heart"; Jana Kramer — "Why Ya Wanna"; Kacey Musgraves — "Merry Go 'Round"; Taylor Swift — "Begin Again"; Carrie Underwood — "Two Black Cadillacs"
Male Video of the Year	Group Video of the Year
**Blake Shelton** — "**Sure Be Cool If You Did**"; Jason Aldean — "Take a Little Ride"; Luke Bryan — "Kiss Tomorrow Goodbye"; Kenny Chesney — "Come Over"; Eric Church — "Creepin'"; Hunter Hayes — "Wanted"	**Lady Antebellum** — "**Downtown**"; Little Big Town — "Pontoon"; Pistol Annies — "Takin' Pills"; Rascal Flatts — "Come Wake Me Up"; The Band Perry — "Better Dig Two"; Zac Brown Band — "Goodbye in Her Eyes"
Duo Video of the Year	CMT Performance of the Year
**Florida Georgia Line** — "**Cruise**"; Big & Rich — "That's Why I Pray"; Love and Theft — "Runnin' Out of Air"; Thompson Square — "If I Didn't Have You"	**From 2012 CMT Artist of the Year** — **Miranda Lambert**, "**Over You**"; From "CMT Unplugged — Dierks Bentley, "5-1-5-0"; From "2012 CMT Artist of the Year — Eric Church, "Homeboy"; From "2012 CMT Artist of the Year —Luke Bryan and Ryan Tedder, "Drunk on You"/"Feel Again"; From "CMT Crossroads — Rascal Flatts and Journey, "Don't Stop Believin'"; From 2012 CMT Artist of the Year — Toby Keith, "Beers Ago"
Collaborative Video of the Year	USA Weekend Breakthrough Video of the Year
**Jason Aldean**, **Luke Bryan** and **Eric Church** — "**The Only Way I Know**"; Kenny Chesney and Tim McGraw — "Feel Like a Rock Star"; Kelly Clarkson and Vince Gill — "Don't Rush"; Brad Paisley and Joe Walsh — "Rocky Mountain Way"; Rascal Flatts and Journey — "Changed"; The Avett Brothers and Randy Travis — "Three Wooden Crosses"	**Florida Georgia Line** — "**Cruise**"; Randy Houser — "How Country Feels"; Jana Kramer — "Why Ya Wanna"; Dustin Lynch — "Cowboys and Angels"; Kip Moore — "Beer Money"; Kacey Musgraves — "Merry Go 'Round"
Nationwide® Insurance On Your Side® Award
**Hunter Hayes**; Lee Brice; Florida Georgia Line; Kip Moore

== Presenters ==
- Kellie Pickler & Scotty McCreery — presented USA Weekend Breakthrough Video of the Year
- AnnaSophia Robb & Brantley Gilbert — Introduced Miranda Lambert
- Scott Avett & Seth Avett — Introduced Kacey Musgraves.
- Duane "Dog" Chapman & Beth Champan — Presented CMT Performance of the Year
- Florida Georgia Line — Introduced Darius Rucker.
- Larry the Cable Guy — Presented Collaborative Video of the Year
- Jana Kramer & Charles Esten — Presented Duo Video of the Year
- Ed Sheeran & Lisa Marie Presley — Introduced Lady Antebellum
- Lenny Kravitz — Presented Female Video of the Year
- The Band Perry — Introduced Keith Urban.
- Keith Urban — Introduced Little Big Town.
- Dax Shepard, Kevin Bacon & Michael Bacon — Presented Group Video of the Year
- Kristen Bell — Introduced Jason Aldean.
- Miranda Lambert — Presented Male Video of the Year
- Rascal Flatts — Introduced Carrie Underwood
- Sheryl Crow & Kenny Rogers — Presented Video of the Year

== Performers ==
Artist(s)	Song
Jason Aldean & Lenny Kravitz	"American Woman"
Miranda Lambert	"Mama's Broken Heart"
Kacey Musgraves	"Blowin' Smoke"
Darius Rucker with Lady Antebellum	"Wagon Wheel"
Hunter Hayes	"I Want Crazy"
Luke Bryan	"Crash My Party"
Taylor Swift	"Red"
Keith Urban	"Little Bit of Everything"
Lady Antebellum	"Goodbye Town"
Little Big Town and Keith Urban	"The Chain"
Florida Georgia Line and Nelly	"Cruise"

Nationwide Insurance Stage performers

- Cassadee Pope — "Wasting All These Tears"
- Dustin Lynch — "Cowboys and Angels"
- Kree Harrison — "All Cried Out"
- Randy Houser — "How Country Feels"
- Love and Theft — "Angel Eyes"
- Ashley Monroe — "Weed Instead of Roses"

== Notes ==
^{1} Miranda Lambert goes solo (Without Blake Shelton)
