= My Kinda Party =

Studio album by Jason Aldean
- Released: November 2, 2010
- Recorded: 2010
- Studios: Treasure Isle Studios and Woodland Sound Studios (Nashville, Tennessee)
- Genres: Country; country rock
- Length: 56:44
- Label: Broken Bow
- Producer: Michael Knox

Jason Aldean chronology
Wide Open (2009)	My Kinda Party (2010)	Night Train (2012)

Singles from My Kinda Party
- 1. "My Kinda Party" Released: August 16, 2010; 2. "Don't You Wanna Stay" Released: November 29, 2010; 3. "Dirt Road Anthem" Released: April 4, 2011; 4. "Tattoos on This Town" Released: September 5, 2011; 5. "Fly Over States" Released: February 6, 2012

My Kinda Party is the fourth studio album by American country music artist Jason Aldean. It was released on November 2, 2010, by Broken Bow Records. The songs were written by various songwriters including Neil Thrasher, Brantley Gilbert and Michael Dulaney.

Aldean said that he chose the name of the album because he thought it was representative of "what my fans have come to expect." He also said that it has a unique sound because he recorded it with his touring band and an engineer who does not work with any other artists. On November 30, 2011, the album received a nomination for the 54th Grammy Awards for Best Country Album.

== Content ==
The first single from My Kinda Party is the title track, which debuted on the Billboard Hot Country Songs chart at number 41. The song has become Aldean's tenth Top 10 hit on that chart, peaking at number two. The song also debuted at number 54 on the Hot 100 chart. "My Kinda Party" was written and originally recorded by country rock artist Brantley Gilbert for his 2009 album Modern Day Prodigal Son. Aldean's version was also certified five-times Platinum by the Recording Industry Association of America (RIAA).

The second single "Don't You Wanna Stay", a duet with pop rock singer Kelly Clarkson, debuted on the country charts from unsolicited airplay at number 59 for the week of November 20, 2010. The song also debuted at number 93 on the Billboard Hot 100 chart. Aldean and Clarkson performed the song at the 44th Annual CMA Awards on November 10, 2010. "Don't You Wanna Stay" became Aldean's fifth number one hit on the Hot Country Songs chart, the week ending March 12, 2011. It was also his first release to AC and Hot AC radio, where it debuted at #15 on the Adult Contemporary chart and #39 on the Adult Top 40 chart. "Don't You Wanna Stay" was also certified triple Platinum by the RIAA.

The third single is the country rap-themed "Dirt Road Anthem", which was previously recorded separately by both of its writers, Brantley Gilbert and Colt Ford. It debuted as an album cut on the Hot Country Songs chart from unsolicited airplay at number 57 for the week ending February 5, 2011. According to AOL's The Boot, Aldean's publicist teased about this song, suggesting Aldean listened to "a little Snoop Dogg in his time"; regarding the song, Aldean said that he did not consider "Dirt Road Anthem" a rap song. Aldean's version of "Dirt Road Anthem" was certified 12× Platinum by the RIAA. "Dirt Road Anthem" became Aldean's sixth number one hit on the country chart the week of July 30, 2011.

The fourth single from My Kinda Party is "Tattoos on This Town". It charted at number 18 on the Bubbling Under Hot 100 chart before it was released as a single. It was released as a single to country radio on September 5, 2011. It debuted on the Hot Country Songs chart at number 59 for the week ending August 27, 2011. On the week ending November 26, 2011, it peaked at number two for six weeks, making it his thirteenth top ten hit to date on this chart. Also, it debuted at number 81 on the Billboard Hot 100 on the week ending October 8, 2011, and has peaked at number 38, making it his fourth consecutive Top 40 hit on this chart. Most recently, it debuted at number 96 on the Canadian Hot 100 and has peaked at number 59. "Tattoos on This Town" has also been certified multi-Platinum by the RIAA.

The album's fifth and final single is "Fly Over States", which was released as a single on February 6, 2012. It debuted at number 59 on Billboard's Hot Country Songs chart, and would go on to become Aldean's seventh number one hit on that chart.

== Reception ==
=== Commercial ===
The album debuted at number two on the US Billboard 200 and the Top Country Albums chart, selling 193,000 copies in its first week of release, giving him his best sales week and a new peak on the list. In its second week of release, the album dropped to number six on the Billboard 200, selling 81,000 copies. In February, the album topped the Top Country Albums chart and stayed there for 12 non-consecutive weeks making it the first album by a male artist to do so since Kenny Chesney's When The Sun Goes Down, which stayed at number one for 14 weeks in 2004. In May 2011, it climbed back to No. 4 in its 29th charting week making it the highest chart position since its debut at No. 2. As of June 2014, the album has sold 3,130,000 copies in the US. It was certified six-times Platinum by the RIAA on August 10, 2026, for 6 million units consumed.

=== Critical ===
Professional ratings
Review scores
Source	Rating
Allmusic	3.5/5 stars
Associated Press	(favorable)
Country Weekly	4/5 stars
The Dallas Morning News	(C)
Roughstock	4/5 stars
The Washington Post	(mixed)
Engine 145	3.5/5 stars

Michael McCall with the Associated Press lauded Aldean for his "fresh sound" on the album, saying that he "stands at the forefront of a movement combining country themes with hard-rock chords". Calling it Aldean's "strongest album to date", Matt Bjorke with Roughstock gave it a four-star rating and said that Aldean "may just be one of country music’s best at making complete albums that are 'all killer, no filler'". Giving it a 3 1/2 rating, Steve Leggett of Allmusic said that the album had "impressive sonic consistency" and "songs that fit his voice". Ken Tucker with Country Weekly gave the album a four-star rating, saying "Jason Aldean has grown from album to album, deftly improving on each previous project. His latest release continues the upward momentum".

Allison Stewart with The Washington Post gave the album a mixed review, saying "Party is likable but Nashville boilerplate; Every other track will sound familiar, even if it's the first time you've heard it". She described Aldean's cover of "Dirt Road Anthem" as "the high point" on the album, calling it a "boundary-stretching moment". Mario Tarradell with The Dallas Morning News gave it a C grade, referring to the material as "a vast array of standard, clichéd country-rock". He also said the track "Dirt Road Anthem" was the only song that "deserves another spin". Juli Thanki with Engine 145 gave the album 3 1/2, saying it "includes some of his most enjoyable and mature work to date".

== Track listing ==
No.	Title	Writer(s)	Length
1.	"Tattoos on This Town"	Neil Thrasher; Wendell Mobley; Michael Dulaney	3:22
2.	"Dirt Road Anthem"	Brantley Gilbert; Colt Ford	3:49
3.	"Church Pew or Bar Stool"	Josh Thompson; Adam Craig; Michael Howard	4:19
4.	"Just Passing Through"	David Lee Murphy; Kim Tribble	3:20
5.	"Fly Over States"	Thrasher; Dulaney	3:38
6.	"My Kinda Party"	Gilbert	4:45
7.	"I Ain't Ready to Quit"	Thomas Rhett; Jaron Boyer; Ben Stennis	3:34
8.	"It Ain't Easy"	Justin Weaver; Caitlyn Smith; Jon Mabe	3:01
9.	"Country Boy's World"	John Edwards; Jayce Hein; Ronny Vines; Tommy Curry	4:07
10.	"The Heartache That Don't Stop Hurting"	Brett James; Leslie Satcher	3:55
11.	"Texas Was You"	Thrasher; Mobley; Martin	3:25
12.	"Don't You Wanna Stay" (with Kelly Clarkson)	Paul Jenkins; Jason Sellers; Andy Gibson	4:16
13.	"See You When I See You"	Thrasher; Mobley; Tony Martin	3:48
14.	"If She Could See Me Now"	Bryan Edwards; Bill Luther; Weaver	3:30
15.	"Days Like These"	Thrasher; Mobley; busbee	3:59
Total length:			56:44

== Personnel ==
Production and Technical

- Michael Knox – producer
- Peter Coleman – recording, mixing
- Mickey Jack Cones – additional vocal recording
- Sam Martin – assistant engineer
- Brandon Epps – editing
- Richard Dodd – mastering
- Shalacy Griffin – production assistant
- James Minchin III – photography
- Glenn Sweitzer – art direction, design
- Tina Crawford – label copy
- Spalding Entertainment – management

Musicians

- Jason Aldean – vocals
- Tony Harrell – acoustic piano, Wurlitzer electric piano, Hammond B3 organ, strings
- Kurt Allison – electric guitar
- Danny Rader – acoustic guitar, banjo
- Adam Shoenfeld – acoustic guitar, electric guitar
- Mike Johnson – steel guitar, lap steel guitar
- Tully Kennedy – bass
- Rich Redmond – drums, percussion
- Perry Coleman – backing vocals
- Shalacy Griffin – backing vocals
- Wes Hightower – backing vocals
- Neil Thrasher – backing vocals
- Lisa Torres – backing vocals
- Kelly Clarkson – vocals on "Don't You Wanna Stay"

== Charts ==
=== Weekly charts ===
Chart (2010–2013)	Peak position
Canadian Albums (Billboard)	15
US Billboard 200	2
US Top Country Albums (Billboard)	1
US Independent Albums (Billboard)	1

=== Year-end charts ===
Chart (2010)	Position
US Billboard 200	123
US Top Country Albums (Billboard)	21
Chart (2011)	Position
US Billboard 200	4
US Top Country Albums (Billboard)	2
Chart (2012)	Position
US Billboard 200	19
US Top Country Albums (Billboard)	6
US Independent Albums (Billboard)	2
Chart (2013)	Position
US Billboard 200	140
Chart (2018)	Position
US Top Country Albums (Billboard)	68

=== Decade-end charts ===
Chart (2010–2019)	Position
US Billboard 200	30

== Certifications ==
Region	Certification	Certified units/sales
Canada (Music Canada)	Platinum	80,000^{^}
United States (RIAA)	6× Platinum	6,000,000^{‡} / 3,130,000
^{^} Shipments figures based on certification alone.
