= Jason Aldean =

American country singer (born 1977)

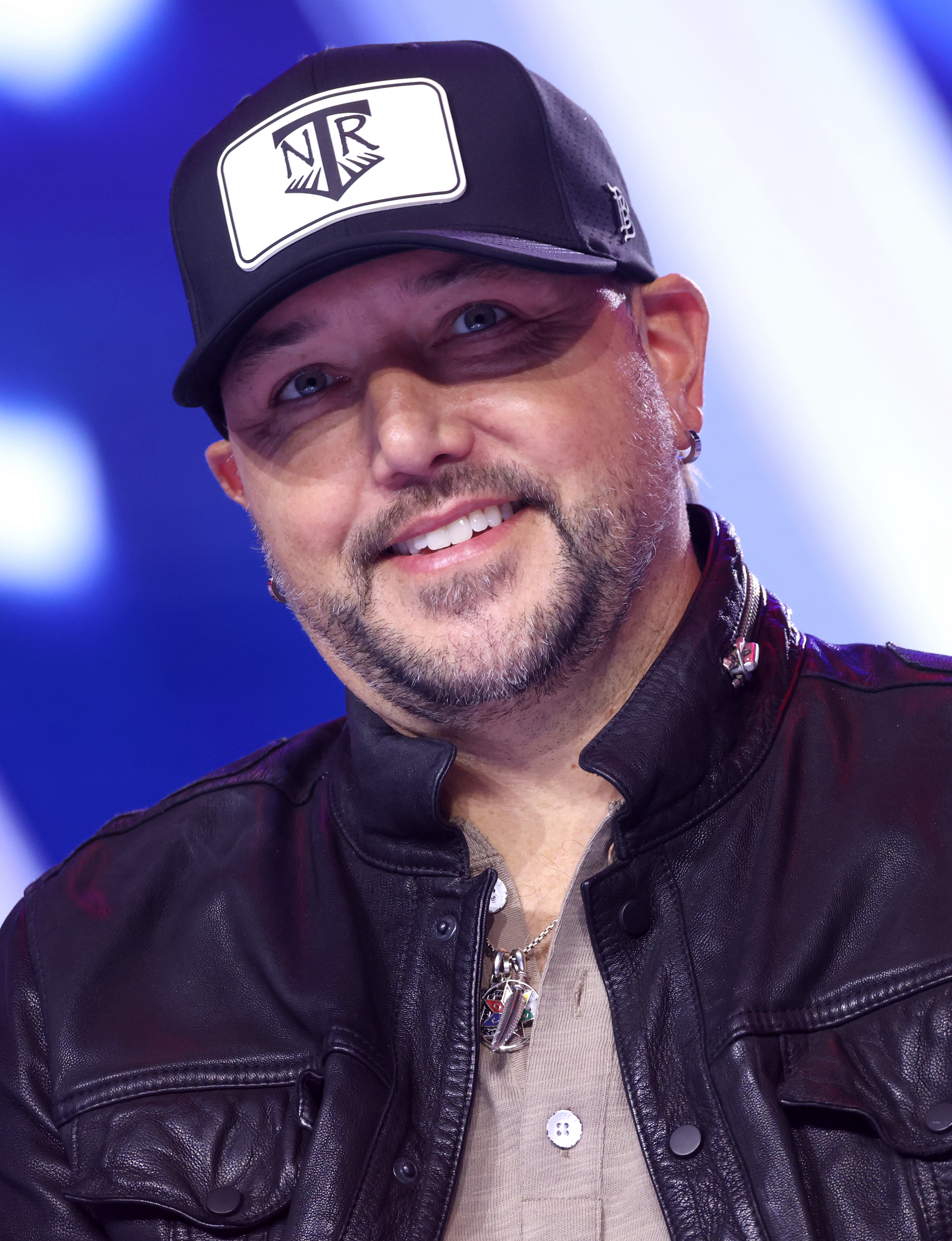
- Aldean in 2025

Background information
- Born: Jason Aldine Williams; February 28, 1977 (age 49); Macon, Georgia, U.S.
- Origin: Nashville, Tennessee, U.S.
- Genres: Country; country rock
- Occupations: Singer; musician
- Instruments: Vocals; guitar
- Years active: 1998–present
- Label: BBR
- Spouses: Jessica Ussery (m. 2001; div. 2013) Brittany Kerr (m. 2015)
- Website: jasonaldean.com

Jason Aldine Williams (born February 28, 1977), known professionally as Jason Aldean, is an American singer. Since 2005, he has been signed to BBR Music Group (formerly known as Broken Bow Records), a record label for which he has released eleven country music albums and 40 singles. His 2010 album, My Kinda Party, is certified six-times platinum by the Recording Industry Association of America (RIAA). His 2012 album Night Train is certified double-platinum, while his 2005 self-titled debut, 2007 album Relentless, 2009 album Wide Open, and 2014 album Old Boots, New Dirt are all certified platinum. Aldean has received five Grammy Award nominations throughout his career, twice for Best Country Album.

30 of Aldean's 41 singles have reached number one on either the Hot Country Songs or Country Airplay charts. His songs include "Amarillo Sky", "She's Country", "Big Green Tractor", "Crazy Town", "My Kinda Party", "Dirt Road Anthem", "Fly Over States", "When She Says Baby", "Burnin' It Down", "You Make It Easy", "If I Didn't Love You", "Trouble with a Heartbreak", "Try That in a Small Town", and "Whiskey Drink".

== Early life ==
Jason Aldine Williams was born in Macon, Georgia, on February 28, 1977. His parents separated when he was three years old. He was raised by his mother in Macon, and during the summer he spent time with his father in Homestead, Florida. He attended Windsor Academy, a private Christian school in Bibb County, Georgia. Before going to work, Aldean's father would map out guitar chords on notebook paper to show his son where to place his fingers to play the chords and Jason would sit and practice all day while his father was at work. At night, they would play guitar together. Soon he could play a song after hearing it only a few times. His early favorites included George Strait's "The Cowboy Rides Away", Hank Williams Jr.'s "The Blues Man", and Alabama's "My Home's in Alabama".

From age 14, after watching the country-music awards on television, he wanted to perform on stage. With his mother's help, he performed at the local VFW hall in Macon. He sang John Anderson's song "Seminole Wind" and Tracy Lawrence's "Sticks and Stones". He then began performing at area talent contests and local fairs. At 15, he joined the "house band" at Georgia nightspot Nashville South.

In order to stand out, Aldean used an alternate spelling of his middle name, Aldine, to come up with the name Aldean.

== Career ==
=== 1998–2004: Career beginnings ===
After high school, with his father's money, Aldean and his band performed at clubs and festivals in the southeastern United States. Aldean began writing and recording original songs with bandmate Justin Weaver. In 1998, he performed songs from his first album at a showcase staged by Atlanta nightclub The Buckboard. He was approached by Michael Knox, then of the Warner-Chappell song-publishing company.

=== 2005–2008: Jason Aldean and Relentless ===
Aldean's debut single, "Hicktown", was released in early 2005. It served as the lead-off to his self-titled debut album and reached number 10 on the US Billboard Hot Country Songs chart. The album contained his first number one hit with "Why". This album contained the number 4 hit "Amarillo Sky", which had previously been a non-charting single in 2002 for McBride & the Ride. The song earned a 2006 ACM nomination for Song of the Year and Video of the Year. Aldean earned the title "Top New Male Vocalist" at the 2006 ACM Awards. Over 1,000,000 copies of the album were sold in the United States and it was certified platinum by the RIAA in 2007.

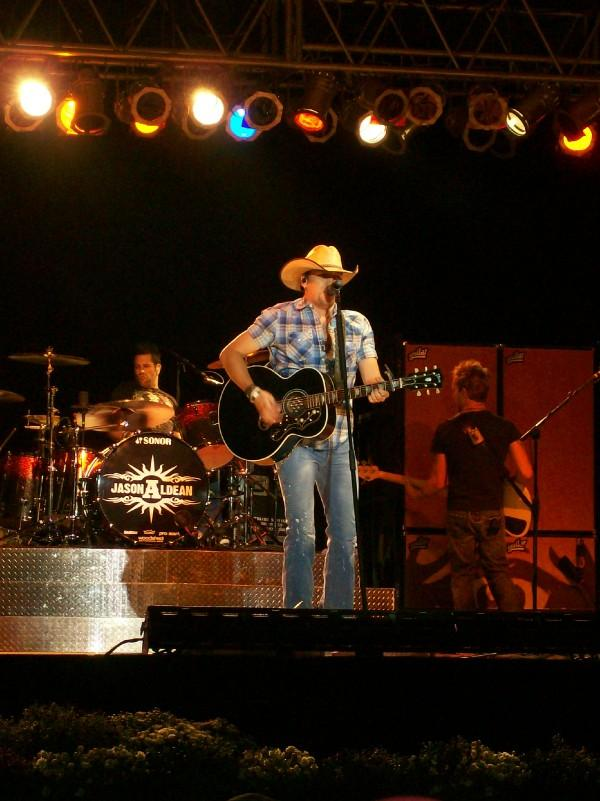
Aldean performing in 2008

Aldean spent most of January 2007, in the studio with producer Michael Knox to finish his second album, Relentless. The album was released on May 29, 2007, and at Wal-Mart locations was sold with a Limited Edition CMT Pick DVD that included Aldean's performances. The album's lead-off single, "Johnny Cash", was originally recorded by Tracy Byrd, but Aldean's version of it peaked at number 6. Its followup "Laughed Until We Cried" became his 5th consecutive Top 10 hit. Relentless was also certified platinum by the RIAA, and its title track was released as its 3rd single. The song was Aldean's lowest-charting single both in the U.S. and Canada, failing to reach the Top 10 on the country charts.

=== 2009–2012: Wide Open and My Kinda Party ===
Aldean released his seventh single titled "She's Country" on December 1, 2008. This song serves as the lead-off single from his third album Wide Open, which was released on April 7, 2009. The single debuted at number 51 on the Hot Country Songs chart in late-November 2008. Being his 7th consecutive Top 40 hit on the country charts, it is also his 1st Top 40 hit on the Billboard Hot 100. It later became his second number-one hit, and his first since "Why" in May 2006. The next single, "Big Green Tractor", became Aldean's third number-one hit. Wide Open debuted at number 2 on the Top Country Albums chart. "The Truth" became the album's third consecutive number-one hit in January 2010, with "Crazy Town" being the album's fourth single and peaking at No. 2 on the country charts.

Aldean performed with Bryan Adams on an episode of CMT Crossroads in the beginning of May, and the episode premiered on June 26, 2009. In an interview with Shave Magazine, Aldean explained that working with Bryan on Crossroads "was great" and that "[h]e was a lot of fun." But the real highlight for him was that he was working with Randy Owen. "I am a big fan of Alabama so I got a chance to work with Randy Owen on this album (it didn't make the album but it eventually made a bonus track). It was really cool. Alabama were like 'The Beatles' for me so working with him was definitely one of the highlights," he said "I mean, both of those guys were really cool moments, but if I had to pick one highlight, it would be working with Randy [Owen] this year." A live DVD titled Wide Open Live & More was released on August 25, 2009. At the 2010 CMT Music Awards, Aldean picked up 3 nominations in Video of the Year and Male Video of the Year for "The Truth", as well as Collaborative Video of the Year and CMT Performance of the Year for his performance of "Heaven" with Bryan Adams.

In August 2010, Aldean released the single "My Kinda Party", which entered the Hot Country Songs chart at No. 41. It is the lead-off single from his album of the same name, which was released on November 2, 2010. It marks as Aldean's tenth top-10 country hit. Aldean also collaborated with Kelly Clarkson on the intimate duet "Don't You Wanna Stay". His and Clarkson's performance on November 10, 2010, at the CMA Awards received positive recognition, and debuted at number 59 on Billboard's Hot Country Songs chart from unsolicited airplay for the week of November 20, 2010. In March 2011, it became Aldean's fifth number-one hit.

In early 2011, Aldean's version of "Dirt Road Anthem", which was recorded previously by both of its writers country rap artist Colt Ford and Brantley Gilbert (who also wrote "My Kinda Party"), debuted on the Hot Country Songs chart at No. 57 as an album cut from an unsolicited airplay for the week of February 5, 2011. In March 2011, the song was chosen as the third single from My Kinda Party. Aldean also collaborated with Ludacris for the song at the 2011 CMT Music Awards in Nashville, Tennessee on June 8, 2011. In addition to making #1 on the Hot Country Songs chart for the week of July 30, 2011, it also became Aldean's first Top 10 hit on the Hot 100 chart, peaking at #7.

Aldean won the CMA award for Album of the Year in 2011 as well as the Musical Event of the Year with "Don't You Wanna Stay", his duet with Kelly Clarkson. This was his first win. On October 25, 2011, it was announced that Aldean would be performing on The Grammy Nominations Concert Live! – Countdown to Music's Biggest Night, the 1-hour special which took place live on Wednesday, November 30, 2011, at the Nokia Theatre in Los Angeles. "Don't You Wanna Stay" received a Grammy nomination for Best Country Duo/Group Performance, but lost to The Civil Wars at the 54th Grammy Awards on February 12, 2012. The fourth single from the album was "Tattoos on This Town", which peaked at No. 2, followed by yet another number one single, entitled "Fly Over States".

=== 2012–2016: Night Train and Old Boots, New Dirt ===
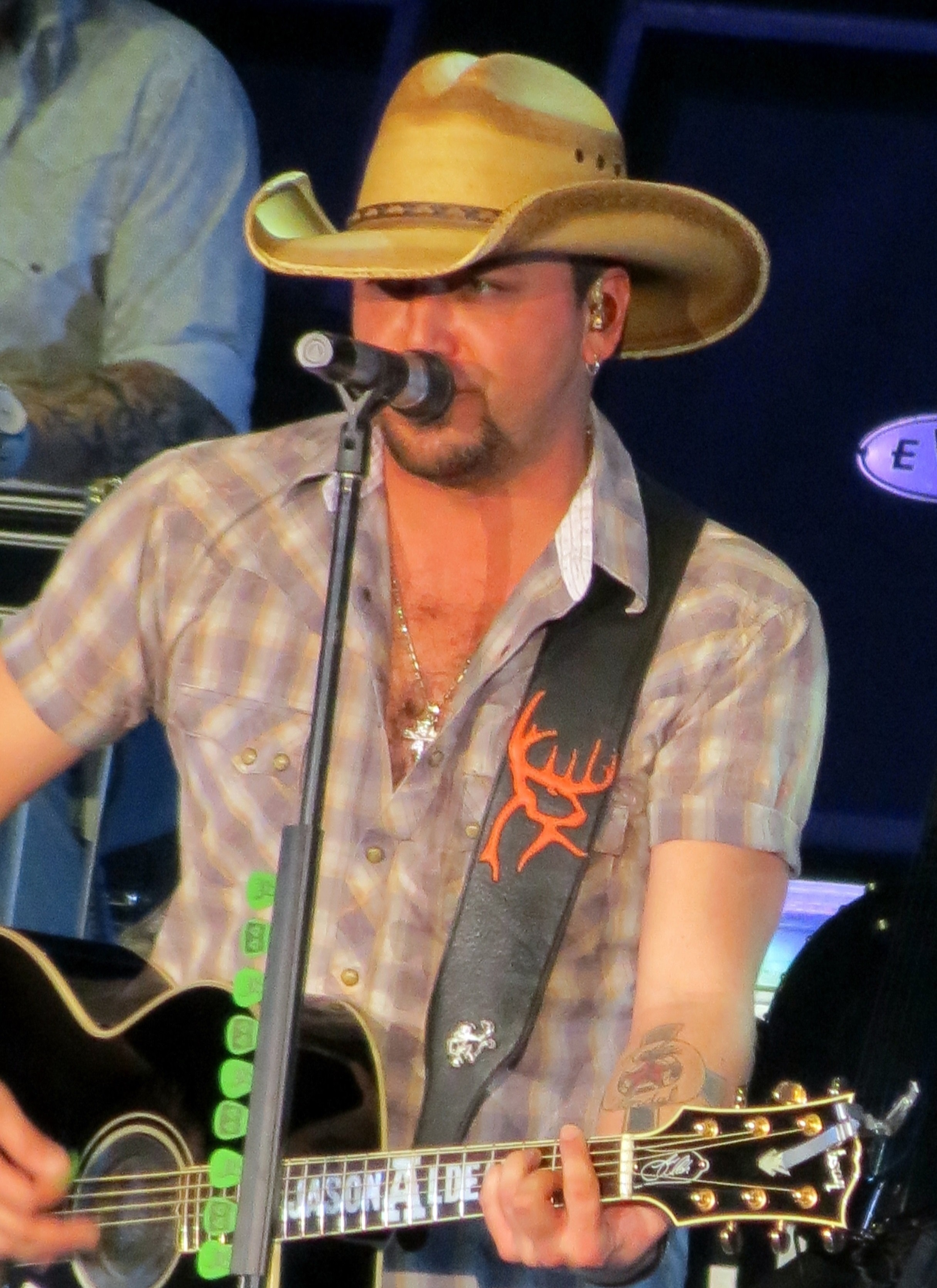
Aldean performing on his Night Train Tour in 2014

The first single from Aldean's fifth album was entitled "Take a Little Ride". It was released on July 16, 2012. Later, the album's title was announced as Night Train. This album was released on October 16, 2012. Its second single, "The Only Way I Know", is a collaboration among him, Luke Bryan, and Eric Church. The album's third single, entitled "1994", is a tribute to Joe Diffie. The album's fourth single, the title track, was released to country radio on June 24, 2013. The fifth single, "When She Says Baby", was released to country radio on November 18 of that same year. "Take a Little Ride", "The Only Way I Know", "Night Train", and "When She Says Baby" all peaked at number 1 on the Country Airplay chart respectively.

During a radio interview on May 18, Aldean hinted at another possible collaboration with Ludacris. He did state that it would not be on Night Train. On December 16, 2014, Ludacris released an Extended Play titled Burning Bridges, in which the title track featured him and Aldean as a duet. Aldean performed "My Kinda Party" during the People's Choice Awards on January 9, 2013. On June 5, 2013, Jason Aldean co-hosted the 2013 CMT Music Awards with actress Kristen Bell. He and Lenny Kravitz opened the awards show singing "American Woman".

On July 22, 2014, Aldean released a new single "Burnin' It Down". This song would serve as the lead single off his sixth studio album Old Boots, New Dirt, which was released on October 7, 2014. This song reached No. 1 both on the Hot Country Songs and Country Airplay charts. The album's second single, "Just Gettin' Started", was released to country radio on November 10, 2014. It reached No. 1 on the Country Airplay chart in March 2015. "Tonight Looks Good on You" was released as the third single on March 23, 2015. It reached No. 1 on the Country Airplay chart in July 2015. also performed CMT Crossroads with Bob Seger song called "Turn the Page". The album's fourth single, "Gonna Know We Were Here" released to country radio on August 17, 2015. It reached No. 2 on the Country Airplay chart in January 2016. Jason Aldean is one of only three artists to achieve RIAA platinum sales certification on an album released this year. His Old Boots, New Dirt album, which debuted at the top of Billboard's all-genre Top 200 chart in October, has now shipped more than one million units. This means that he is the only country star to release a platinum-seller in 2014, and joins only Taylor Swift and Ariana Grande in platinum album certifications for collections released this year.

At the conclusion of Aldean's Burn it Down Tour, he donated over $600,000 to Susan G. Komen for the Cure of South Florida.

=== 2016–2018: They Don't Know and Rearview Town ===
In July 2016 it was announced that the seventh regular studio album, They Don't Know, was set for release on September 9 of that year. Again produced by Michael Knox, the album was preceded by the single "Lights Come On", released to country radio on April 1, 2016. The album's second single, "A Little More Summertime", released to country radio on July 15, 2016. The album's third single, "Any Ol' Barstool", was released to country radio on December 5, 2016. The album's fourth and final single, the title track of the album, was released to country radio on May 8, 2017. At the 2016 ACM Awards, Aldean was awarded Entertainer of the Year for the first time in his career. He would go on to win that award in 2017 and also 2018.

In March 2017, Aldean announced that he is working on his eighth album, titled Rearview Town, which was released on April 13, 2018. The lead single, "You Make It Easy", was released on January 26, 2018. Aldean also confirmed two other songs would appear on the album: "Gettin' Warmed Up" and "Set It Off".

On October 1, 2017, Aldean had just begun performing "When She Says Baby" at the Route 91 Harvest music festival on the Las Vegas Strip in Paradise, Nevada, when Stephen Paddock began firing into the crowd from the 32nd floor of the Mandalay Bay Resort. Aldean and his band managed to exit the stage unharmed but 60 concertgoers died and 867 others were injured during the incident. On October 7, Aldean opened Saturday Night Live with words of support for those hurting in the aftermath of the shooting, saying that "we witnessed one of the worst tragedies in American history. Like everyone, I'm struggling to understand what happened that night (and why) and how to pick up the pieces and start to heal. But you can be sure that we're going to walk through these tough times together, every step of the way. Because when America is at its best, our bond and our spirit — it's unbreakable." He then performed a cover of "I Won't Back Down" by Tom Petty, who had died five days earlier.

=== 2019–2023: 9 and Macon, Georgia ===
Aldean performed at the 2019 Musicians Hall of Fame and Museum Concert and Induction Ceremony. Aldean's ninth album, titled 9, was released on November 22, 2019. The album's first single, "We Back" released to country radio on September 9, 2019. It peaked at number 6 on the Country Airplay in March 2020 and number 1 on the Canadian Country chart. The album's second single, "Got What I Got" released to country radio on April 6, 2020. "Blame It on You" was released on October 26, 2020, as the album's third and final single.

On July 23, 2021, Aldean released the single "If I Didn't Love You", featuring Carrie Underwood. It was the leadoff single to his tenth studio album, a double album project titled Macon, Georgia. The first half, Macon, was released on November 12, 2021. On January 14, 2022, "Trouble with a Heartbreak" was released as the album's second single and was the leadoff single to the second half of the album, Georgia, which was released on April 22, 2022. On March 25, 2022, Aldean and Brantley Gilbert released the single "Rolex® on a Redneck". On July 18, 2022, Aldean released "That's What Tequila Does" to country radio as the third and final single off Macon, Georgia. In November 2022, Aldean released his version of Alabama's "Christmas in Dixie".

=== 2023–2025: "Try That in a Small Town" and Highway Desperado ===
On May 19, 2023, Aldean released "Try That in a Small Town" as the lead single from his eleventh album. Its music video was released on July 14, generating controversy for invoking imagery related to the 2020 George Floyd protests while being filmed in front of the Maury County courthouse, the site of a 1946 race riot and a 1927 lynching of a Black man. Four days after its release, CMT pulled the music video from air. The song and video were denounced by fellow musicians including Sheryl Crow, Jason Isbell and Margo Price while drawing support from country musicians Cody Johnson and Brantley Gilbert and then-former president Donald Trump. Amid the controversy, the song debuted at number two on the Billboard Hot 100, Aldean's best chart performance of his career. The next week, it rose to number one and became Aldean's first national chart-topper.

On August 24, 2023, Aldean announced his eleventh album Highway Desperado, which was released on November 3, 2023, and released the song "Let Your Boys Be Country" the following day, on August 25. "Let Your Boys Be Country" was later released as the album's second single on November 27, 2023.

"Whiskey Drink", also originally a promotional single, would be released to country radio on July 24, 2024 as the album's third single.

=== 2025-present: "How Far Does a Goodbye Go" and Songs About Us ===
On September 12, 2025, Aldean released "How Far Does a Goodbye Go" as the lead single from his twelfth album, Songs About Us. The album was announced on November 7, 2025, and was released on April 24, 2026.

== Personal life ==
Aldean married Jessica Ann Ussery on August 4, 2001. Together, the couple have a daughter born in 2003, and another born in 2007. On September 30, 2012, Aldean admitted to having "acted inappropriately at a bar" with former American Idol contestant Brittany Kerr, responding to reports linking her and Aldean. In a statement, Kerr said she had suffered "a lapse in judgment" and "would like to sincerely apologize to everyone that has been affected by this." Aldean filed for divorce on April 26, 2013, citing irreconcilable differences and listing the filing date as the formal separation date.

Aldean and Kerr began dating and made their first public appearance as a couple at the 2014 CMT Awards. They announced their engagement in September 2014 and were married on March 21, 2015. Their son Memphis was born on December 1, 2017. Their daughter Navy was born in early 2019.

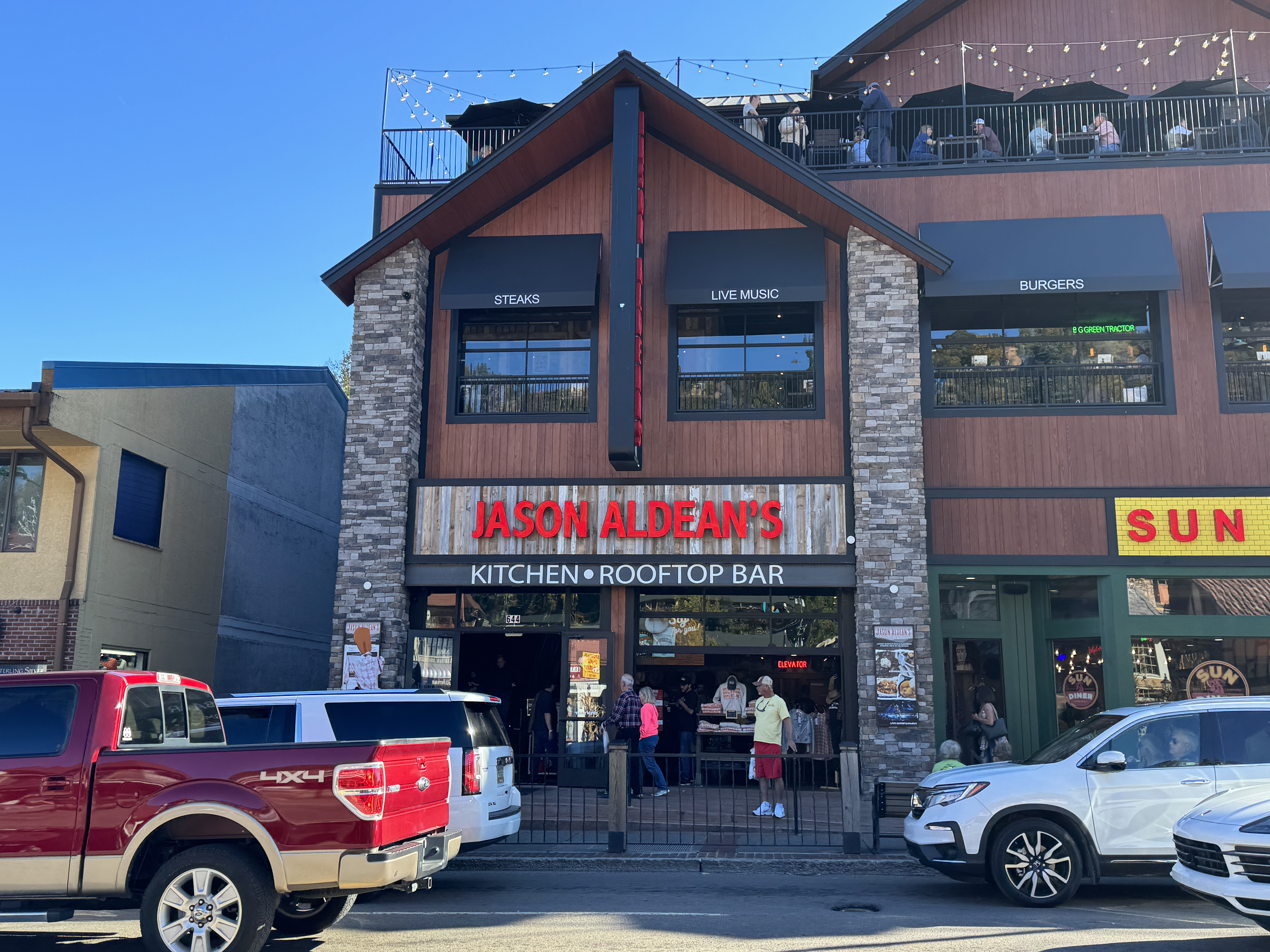
Jason Aldean's Kitchen + Rooftop Bar in Gatlinburg, Tennessee in 2023.

Aldean owns part of a hunting company, Buck Commander, in partnership with former Major League Baseball (MLB) players Adam LaRoche, Ryan Langerhans, and Tom Martin; Willie Robertson of Duck Dynasty; and fellow country singers Luke Bryan and Tyler Farr. He also owns Jason Aldean's Kitchen + Rooftop Bar, which opened in Nashville in 2018. A second location in Gatlinburg opened in 2023, a third location in Pittsburgh opened in March 2024, and a fourth location in Las Vegas opened in December 2024.

He also is a co-owner of the E3 Chophouse in Nashville with Luke Bryan and Adam LaRoche. The restaurant opened in 2013 before closing in February 2026. In June 2026, a lawsuit was filed against Aldean, Bryan and LaRoche individually, alleging unpaid rent and breach of contract, following a $1.4 million judgment against the restaurant's parent company.

In 2015, Forbes estimated Aldean's annual income at $43.5 million. Aldean was the seventh highest-earning country musician making about $32.5 million in 2017. In 2017, Aldean was on Forbes' Celebrity 100 list, being ranked at 98. Aldean became the sixth artist to receive the ACM Dick Clark Artist of the Decade Award in 2019. The award is given to artists who were consistently on top of the charts over the span of the decade.

=== Charity work ===
Aldean has supported raising awareness for breast cancer research since 2004, after losing a close friend to the disease. He has raised millions for cancer research through donating a portion of each ticket sale, special merchandise, VIP meet and greets, a donate button on his website, and his annual Concert for the Cure, most of which he has contributed to Susan G. Komen for the Cure.

=== Political beliefs ===
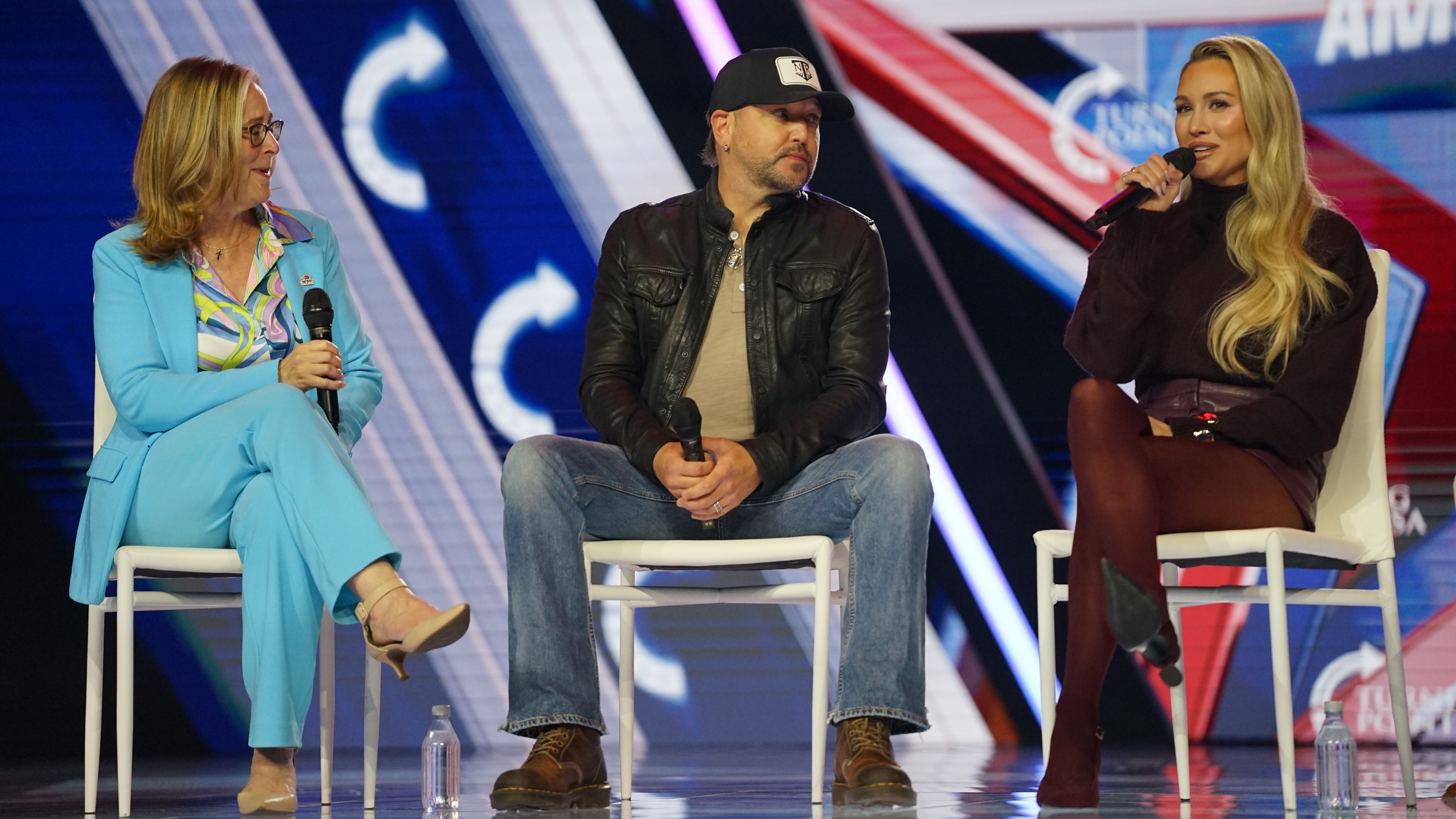
Jenny Story and the Aldeans at AmericaFest 2025

Aldean is a registered Republican. He performed at a concert for the inauguration of President Donald Trump in 2017, which he described as an "honor," stating he viewed it as a celebration of the presidency rather than a purely political event. He has posted support for Trump on Instagram, including a 2024 post with the caption "Ladies and Gentlemen, President Donald J. Trump" where he expressed that a potential second Trump term would be a "new era" for America.

The 2023 release of his song "Try That in a Small Town" attracted significant political controversy, with critics interpreting the song as having political undertones, while he defended it as being about community and safety.

He endorsed Trump in the 2024 United States presidential election. Aldean is a spokesperson for Patriot Mobile, a Christian, conservative wireless provider.

== Band members ==
- Jason Aldean – lead vocals, guitar, piano
- Tully Kennedy – bass guitar, backing vocals
- Kurt Allison – lead guitar
- Rich Redmond – drums, percussion
- Carl Ray (Jay) Jackson – pedal steel guitar, banjo, backing vocals
- Jack Sizemore – guitar, backing vocals

== Discography ==
=== Studio albums ===
- Jason Aldean (2005)
- Relentless (2007)
- Wide Open (2009)
- My Kinda Party (2010)
- Night Train (2012)
- Old Boots, New Dirt (2014)
- They Don't Know (2016)
- Rearview Town (2018)
- 9 (2019)
- Macon, Georgia (2021–2022)
- Highway Desperado (2023)
- Songs About Us (2026)

== Tours ==
Headlining

- 2008: CMT ON TOUR: Relentless
- 2010: Wide Open Tour
- 2011–12: My Kinda Party Tour
- 2013: Night Train Tour
- 2014–15: Burn It Down Tour
  - Twelve shows in 2015 were merged with Kenny Chesney (The Big Revival Tour)
- 2016: We Were Here/Six String Circus Tour
- 2017: They Don't Know Tour
- 2018: High Noon Neon Tour
- 2019: Ride All Night Tour
- 2020: We Back Tour
- 2021: Back in the Saddle Tour
- 2022: Rock N' Roll Cowboy Tour
- 2023: Highway Desperado Tour
- 2024: Highway Desperado Tour
- 2024: Rock the Country Tour
- 2025: Full Throttle Tour
- 2026: Songs About Us Tour

Supporting

- 2006: Me and My Gang Tour (with Rascal Flatts)
- 2007: Still Feels Good Tour (with Rascal Flatts)
- 2007: Free and Easy Summer Tour (with Dierks Bentley and Miranda Lambert)
- 2008: Live Your Voice Tour (with Tim McGraw)
- 2010: Last Rodeo Tour (with Brooks & Dunn)

== Filmography ==
- CMT Crossroads with Bryan Adams (2009), Bob Seger (2014)
- Sweet Vengeance (2013)
- CMT Music Awards (2013): Co-Host with Kristen Bell
- The Voice (Fall 2021): Advisor for Team Kelly

== Awards and nominations ==
=== Grammy Awards ===
Year	Award	Result
2012	Best Country Solo Performance – "Dirt Road Anthem"	Nominated
2012	Best Country Duo/Group Performance – "Don't You Wanna Stay" (with Kelly Clarkson)	Nominated
2012	Best Country Album – My Kinda Party	Nominated
2014	Best Country Album – Night Train	Nominated
2022	Best Country Duo/Group Performance – "If I Didn't Love You" (with Carrie Underwood)	Nominated

=== Other awards ===
Year	Organization	Award	Result
2005	ACM Awards	Top New Male Vocalist	Won
2007	ACM Awards	Song of the Year – "Amarillo Sky"	Nominated
2007	ACM Awards	Video of the Year – "Amarillo Sky"	Nominated
2007	CMA Awards	Horizon Award	Nominated
2010	American Country Awards	Male Artist of the Year	Nominated
2010	CMT Music Awards	Video of the Year – "The Truth"	Nominated
2010	CMT Music Awards	Male Video of the Year – "The Truth"	Nominated
2010	CMT Music Awards	Collaborative Video of the Year – "Heaven" with Bryan Adams from CMT Crossroads	Nominated
2011	ACM Awards	Entertainer of the Year	Nominated
2011	ACM Awards	Male Vocalist of the Year	Nominated
2011	Billboard Music Awards	Top Country Artist	Nominated
2011	Billboard Music Awards	Top Country Album – My Kinda Party	Nominated
2011	CMT Music Awards	Video of the Year – "My Kinda Party"	Nominated
2011	CMT Music Awards	Male Video of the Year – "My Kinda Party"	Nominated
2011	CMT Music Awards	Collaborative Video of the Year – "Don't You Wanna Stay" (with Kelly Clarkson)	Nominated
2011	CMT Music Awards	Best Web Video of the Year – "My Kinda Party" live from CMT.com webcast	Nominated
2011	CMA Awards	Entertainer of the Year	Nominated
2011	CMA Awards	Single of the Year – "Don't You Wanna Stay" (with Kelly Clarkson)	Nominated
2011	CMA Awards	Musical Event of the Year – "Don't You Wanna Stay" (with Kelly Clarkson)	Won
2011	CMA Awards	Album of the Year – My Kinda Party	Won
2011	CMA Awards	Male Vocalist of the Year	Nominated
2011	Billboard Touring Awards	Breakthrough	Won
2011	American Music Awards	Favorite Country Male Artist	Nominated
2011	American Music Awards	Favorite Country Album – My Kinda Party	Nominated
2011	American Country Awards	Male Music Video of the Year – "My Kinda Party"	Nominated
2011	American Country Awards	Artist of the Year	Won
2011	American Country Awards	Male Artist of the Year	Nominated
2011	American Country Awards	Album of the Year – My Kinda Party	Won
2011	American Country Awards	Single of the Year: Male – "My Kinda Party"	Won
2011	American Country Awards	Single of the Year: Vocal Collaboration – "Don't You Wanna Stay" (with Kelly Clarkson)	Won
2011	American Country Awards	Touring Headline Act of the Year	Won
2011	American Country Awards	Music Video: Group, Duo, or Collaboration – "Don't You Wanna Stay" (with Kelly Clarkson)	Won
2012	ACM Awards	Entertainer of the Year	Nominated
2012	ACM Awards	Male Vocalist of the Year	Nominated
2012	ACM Awards	Album of the Year – My Kinda Party	Nominated
2012	ACM Awards	Vocal Event of the Year – "Don't You Wanna Stay" (with Kelly Clarkson)	Won
2012	ACM Awards	Single Record of the Year – "Don't You Wanna Stay" (with Kelly Clarkson)	Won
2012	ACM Awards	Video of the Year – "Tattoos on This Town"	Nominated
2012	Billboard Music Awards	Top Country Artist	Nominated
2012	Billboard Music Awards	Top Country Album – My Kinda Party	Won
2012	Billboard Music Awards	Top Country Song – "Dirt Road Anthem"	Won
2012	CMT Music Awards	Video of the Year – "Dirt Road Anthem"	Nominated
2012	CMT Music Awards	Male Video of the Year – "Dirt Road Anthem"	Nominated
2012	CMT Music Awards	CMT Performance of the Year – "Tattoos on This Town" (from Artists of the Year)	Won
2012	Teen Choice Awards	Male Country Artist	Nominated
2012	Teen Choice Awards	Choice Country Song – "Tattoos on This Town"	Nominated
2012	CMA Awards	Entertainer of the Year	Nominated
2012	CMA Awards	Male Vocalist of the Year	Nominated
2012	CMA Awards	Single of the Year	Nominated
2012	American Music Awards	Country Music: Favorite Male Artist	Nominated
2012	American Country Awards	Artist of the Year	Nominated
2012	American Country Awards	Male Artist of the Year	Nominated
2012	American Country Awards	Single of the Year – "Tattoos on This Town"	Nominated
2012	American Country Awards	Single by a Male Artist – "Tattoos on This Town"	Nominated
2012	American Country Awards	Song of the Year – "Fly Over States"	Nominated
2012	American Country Awards	Song of the Year – "Tattoos on This Town"	Nominated
2012	American Country Awards	Touring Artist of the Year	Won
2013	People's Choice Awards	Favorite Country Singer	Nominated
2013	ACM Awards	Entertainer of the Year	Nominated
2013	ACM Awards	Male Vocalist of the Year	Won
2013	ACM Awards	Vocal Event of the Year – "The Only Way I Know" (with Luke Bryan and Eric Church)	Won
2013	Billboard Music Awards	Top Country Artist	Nominated
2013	Billboard Music Awards	Top Country Album – Night Train	Nominated
2013	Billboard Music Awards	Top Male Artist	Nominated
2013	CMT Music Awards	Video of the Year – "1994"	Nominated
2013	CMT Music Awards	Male Video of the Year – "Take a Little Ride"	Nominated
2013	CMT Music Awards	Collaborative Video of the Year – "The Only Way I Know" (with Luke Bryan and Eric Church)	Won
2013	Teen Choice Awards	Male Country Artist	Nominated
2013	CMA Awards	Entertainer of the Year	Nominated
2013	CMA Awards	Male Vocalist of the Year	Nominated
2013	CMA Awards	Musical Event of the Year – "The Only Way I Know" (with Luke Bryan and Eric Church)	Nominated
2013	American Country Awards	Artist of the Year	Nominated
2013	American Country Awards	Artist of the Year: Male	Nominated
2013	American Country Awards	Album of the Year – Night Train	Nominated
2013	American Country Awards	Single of the Year: Vocal Collaboration – "The Only Way I Know" (with Luke Bryan and Eric Church)	Nominated
2013	American Country Awards	Touring Artist of the Year	Nominated
2013	American Country Awards	Music Video of the Year: Male – "Take a Little Ride"	Nominated
2014	ACM Awards	Male Vocalist of the Year	Won
2014	American Music Awards	Favorite Country Male Artist	Nominated
2014	American Country Countdown Awards	Digital Song of the Year – "Burnin' It Down"	Nominated
2014	American Country Countdown Awards	Artist of the Year	Won
2014	American Country Countdown Awards	Male Vocalist of the Year	Nominated
2014	American Country Countdown Awards	Song of the Year – "When She Says Baby"	Nominated
2015	ACM Awards	Entertainer of the Year	Nominated
2015	ACM Awards	Male Vocalist of the Year	Won
2015	ACM Awards	Album of the Year – Old Boots, New Dirt	Nominated
2015	Billboard Music Awards	Top Country Artist	Nominated
2015	Billboard Music Awards	Top Country Album – Old Boots, New Dirt	Won
2015	Billboard Music Awards	Top Country Song – "Burnin' It Down"	Won
2016	ACM Awards	Top Country Song – "Gonna Know We Were Here"	Nominated
2016	ACM Awards	Top Country Song – "Lights Come On"	Won
2016	ACM Awards	Top Country Artist	Nominated
2016	ACM Awards	Entertainer of the Year	Won
2016	iHeartRadio Music Awards	Country Artist of the Year	Nominated
2017	ACM Awards	Entertainer of the Year	Won
2017	ACM Awards	Male Vocalist of the Year	Nominated
2017	Billboard Music Awards	Top Country Artist	Nominated
2017	Billboard Music Awards	Top Country Album – They Don't Know	Nominated
2017	CMT Music Awards	Male Video of the Year – "Lights Come On"	Nominated
2017	CMT Music Awards	CMT Performance of the Year – "Hicktown"	Nominated
2017	American Music Awards	Favorite Album - Country – They Don't Know	Nominated
2018	ACM Awards	Entertainer of the Year	Won
2018	ACM Awards	Male Vocalist of the Year	Nominated
2018	CMT Music Awards	Performance of the Year – "Midnight Rider" (with various artists)	Nominated
2018	CMT Music Awards	Performance of the Year – "I Won't Back Down" (with various artists)	Nominated
2018	CMT Music Awards	Male Video of the Year – "You Make It Easy"	Nominated
2018	CMA Awards	Entertainer of the Year	Nominated
2018	CMA Awards	Single of the Year – "Drowns the Whiskey" (feat. Miranda Lambert)	Nominated
2018	CMA Awards	Song of the Year – "Drowns the Whiskey" (feat. Miranda Lambert)	Nominated
2018	CMA Awards	Musical Event of the Year – "Drowns the Whiskey" (feat. Miranda Lambert)	Nominated
2019	iHeartRadio Music Awards	Country Artist of the Year	Nominated
2019	Billboard Music Awards	Top Country Male Artist	Nominated
2019	Billboard Music Awards	Top Country Artist	Nominated
2019	Billboard Music Awards	Top Country Album – Rearview Town	Nominated
2019	ACM Awards	ACM Dick Clark Artist of the Decade Award	Won
2019	ACM Awards	Entertainer of the Year	Nominated
2019	ACM Awards	Music Event of the Year – "Drowns the Whiskey" (feat. Miranda Lambert)	Nominated
2019	CMT Music Awards	Male Video of the Year – "Drowns the Whiskey" (feat. Miranda Lambert)	Nominated
2019	CMT Music Awards	Collaborative Video of the Year – "Drowns the Whiskey" (feat. Miranda Lambert)	Nominated
2019	CMT Music Awards	Collaborative Video of the Year – "Straight to Hell" (with Darius Rucker, Luke Bryan, Charles Kelley)	Nominated
