= Night Train (Jason Aldean album) =

Album by Jason Aldean

Studio album by Jason Aldean
- Released: October 16, 2012
- Recorded: 2012
- Genres: Country pop; arena rock; Southern rock
- Length: 53:33
- Label: Broken Bow
- Producer: Michael Knox

Jason Aldean chronology
My Kinda Party (2010)	Night Train (2012)	Old Boots, New Dirt (2014)

Singles from Night Train
- 1. "Take a Little Ride" Released: July 16, 2012; 2. "The Only Way I Know" Released: November 12, 2012; 3. "1994" Released: March 11, 2013; 4. "Night Train" Released: June 24, 2013; 5. "When She Says Baby" Released: November 18, 2013

Night Train is the fifth studio album by American country music artist Jason Aldean. It was released on October 16, 2012, via Broken Bow Records. The album features a collaboration with Luke Bryan and Eric Church on "The Only Way I Know". It was produced by Michael Knox and features Aldean's road band, with songs written by various songwriters.

The album debuted at number one on the US Billboard 200, making it Aldean's first album to do so. Night Train sold 409,000 copies on its first week, making it the biggest opening sales for a country album since Taylor Swift's Speak Now sold 1,049,000 copies in 2010, as well as the fourth biggest opening sales for an album in 2012.

== Content ==
"Wheels Rollin'" was written specifically for Aldean. "Black Tears" had previously been recorded by Florida Georgia Line on their debut EP, Anything Like Me.

== Reception ==
=== Commercial ===
The album debuted at number one on the US Billboard 200, and the Top Country Albums chart, selling 409,303 copies in its first week of release. The album was also the highest first sales week of a country album since 2010 behind Taylor Swift's Speak Now. It was also the fourth biggest opening sales for an album in 2012, after Swift's Red with 1,208,000 copies, Mumford and Sons' Babel with 600,000 copies sold, and One Direction's Take Me Home with 540,000 copies sold in the first week. Night Train was certified platinum, signifying one million copies shipped, in December 2012, Aldean's fifth straight album to do so. It was the 10th best-selling album of 2012 in the US, having sold 1,024,000 copies for the year. As of January 2015, the album has sold 1,750,000 copies in the US.

=== Critical ===
Professional ratings
Aggregate scores
Source	Rating
Metacritic	(68/100)
Review scores
Source	Rating
About.com	3/5 stars
AllMusic	2.5/5 stars
American Songwriter	3/5 stars
Got Country Online	5/5 stars
The Michigan Daily	3.5/5 stars
Music Is My Oxygen Weekly	4.5/5 stars
Pegasus News	4/5 stars
Reporter Online	4/5 stars
Roughstock	3/5 stars
Taste of Country	3/5 stars
USA Today	3/4 stars
The Washington Times	2/4 stars

Night Train has received generally positive reviews from most music critics. At Metacritic, which assigns a normalized rating out of 100 to reviews from mainstream critics, the album received an average score of 68, based on 6 reviews, which indicates "generally favorable reviews". The positive or favorable review and ratings for the album came in from the Entertainment Weekly, Got Country Online, The Michigan Daily, Music Is My Oxygen Weekly, Newsday, Pegasus News, Reporter Online, ukCOUNTRYmusic.NET, USA Today. The mixed reviews for the release are from About.com, AllMusic, American Songwriter, Roughstock, Taste of Country, Ultimate Guitar and The Washington Times.

The most glowing review for the album came from Donna Block with Got Country Online, who gave Night Train five-stars, and stated "all the tracks blend seamlessly from one to another on his fifth album." The next best rating for the album was a 4.5-star allocation, which was by Rob Burkhardt with Music Is My Oxygen Weekly, and said that "Night Train is a well-crafted, elegantly produced record that takes risks, flirting with musical boundaries and occasionally tackling tough topics, but in a way that preserves the integrity both of the artist and the genre." The album garnered two 4-star reviews the first from Pegasus News' Audrey Swanson, who affirmed that "Night Train, with equal parts passion, fun, vulnerability, and wildness, proves that Aldean is now more than eligible to be dubbed the 'badass' of contemporary country music." The second from Reporter Online' Krista Bellardo, who noted that the album is "Armed with great balance, catchy lyrics and strong melodies, you are likely to keep these songs in your head for days." Lastly, Andrew Eckhous of The Michigan Daily rated the album a 3.5-star effort, and wrote that "Night Train successfully bridges the divide between pop-country and radio rock...With Night Train, Aldean is making a serious effort to be a crossover star. Granted, he’s not crossing over very far...Night Train is a country-pop album, meaning it inherently carries an aura of corniness."

The album got four three-star reviews from About.com, American Songwriter, Roughstock and Taste of Country publications. First, About.com's Robert Silva surmised that "But too often the songs are weighed down by arena-rock white noise and watery lyricism. Still, there are few true clunkers here (the less said about the maudlin stripper song 'Black Tears' the better). Listeners willing to play the law of averages are encouraged to roll the dice." Next, Jewly Hight of American Songwriter proclaimed that the "album is no wistful affair." Then, Dan MacIntosh of Roughstock stated that "Night Train is mostly far closer to Southern rock than traditional country." Lastly, Taste of Country's Billy Dukes was critical about how "In being too technical, ‘Night Train’ loses a little soul...yet from top to bottom, the singer's fifth project leaves one wanting some magic never felt before." The worst rating come from Stephen Thomas Erlewine of AllMusic, who cringed that the album "feels weary, a little hollow, and not at all fun."

The reviews that were given out of four was the USA Today and The Washington Times. Jerry Shriver with USA Today rated the album a three-star effort, and stated that the album had a "progressive sound apparent throughout the album". On the other hand, Andrew Leahey of The Washington Times rated the album a two-star release, and he wrote that the album "feels hollow at the middle, like it’s running on fumes instead of actual inspiration." On the subject of ratings out of ten, ukCOUNTRYmusic.NET's Jordan Mitchell rated the album a nine-out-of-ten, and called the album "well written and perfected by his iconic voice." Conversely, BwareDWare94 of Ultimate Guitar rated the album a 5.5-out-of-ten, and noted that "Aldean has always released solid albums. They're worth the money, and "Night Train" is no exception. You can expect distorted guitars, faint steel rides, and soaring vocals." BwareDWare94 wrote that if not for the song "1994" that the rating would be an 8 or a 9, but the song according to the reviewer was "just God awful", yet the reviewer alluded to that "Some may call this album a step back, but to this listener it's a stellar return to form."

Of the graded reviews, Mandi Bierly with Entertainment Weekly gave the album (A−), saying, "While Aldean can pull off his wilder detours, he's at his best when he hews to traditional themes." Glenn Gamboa Newsday graded the album a (B+), and commented that "'Night Train' shows no sign of slowing him down." The lone review without a score was from Tammy Ragusa with Country Weekly, and she said that "With Night Train, gone are the days of Jason just “doing what he does best.” Because, with these 15 tracks, it's clear he can do it all pretty damn good."

== Track listing ==
No.	Title	Writer(s)	Length
1.	"This Nothin' Town"	busbee; Neil Thrasher; Wendell Mobley	3:11
2.	"When She Says Baby"	Rhett Akins; Ben Hayslip	2:51
3.	"Feel That Again"	Thrasher; Mobley; Vicky McGehee	3:21
4.	"Wheels Rollin'"	Thrasher; Mobley; Hillary Lindsey	4:41
5.	"Talk"	Thrasher; Mobley	3:50
6.	"The Only Way I Know" (with Luke Bryan & Eric Church)	David Lee Murphy; Hayslip	3:13
7.	"Take a Little Ride"	Dylan Altman; Rodney Clawson; Jim McCormick	3:09
8.	"I Don’t Do Lonely Well"	Thrasher; Tom Shapiro; Chuck Wicks	3:25
9.	"Night Train"	Thrasher; Michael Dulaney	3:52
10.	"1994"	Thomas Rhett; Luke Laird; Barry Dean	4:03
11.	"Staring at the Sun"	Thrasher; Mobley; Tony Martin	3:16
12.	"Drink One for Me"	Thrasher; Mobley; Martin	3:07
13.	"Black Tears"	Canaan Smith; Tyler Hubbard	4:16
14.	"Walking Away"	Murphy; Clawson	3:37
15.	"Water Tower"	Jason Sellers; Paul Jenkins; Dulaney	3:41

== Personnel ==
- Jason Aldean – lead vocals
- Kurt Allison – electric guitar
- Luke Bryan – vocals on "The Only Way I Know"
- Eric Church – vocals on "The Only Way I Know"
- Perry Coleman – background vocals
- Shalacy Griffin – background vocals
- Tony Harrell – Hammond B-3 organ, piano, strings, Wurlitzer
- Wes Hightower – background vocals
- Mike Johnson – lap steel guitar, steel guitar
- Charlie Judge – Hammond B-3 organ, piano
- Tully Kennedy – bass guitar
- Luke Laird – drum programming
- Rob McNelley – electric guitar
- Danny Rader – banjo, 12-string guitar, acoustic guitar, hi-string guitar, mandolin, resonator guitar
- Rich Redmond – drums, percussion
- Adam Shoenfeld – e-bow, electric guitar
- Neil Thrasher – background vocals

== Charts and certifications ==
=== Weekly charts ===
==== Album ====
Chart (2012–15)	Peak position
Australian Albums (ARIA)	97
Canadian Albums Chart	1
US Billboard 200	1
US Billboard Top Country Albums	1
US Billboard Independent Albums	1

==== Singles ====
Year	Single	Peak chart positions				
Year	Single	US Country	US Country Airplay	US	CAN Country	CAN
2012	"Take a Little Ride"	1	1	12	—	22
2012	"The Only Way I Know"	5	1	40	2	53
2013	"1994"	10	14	52	18	65
2013	"Night Train"	2	1	26	1	39
2013	"When She Says Baby"	2	1	38	1	43
"—" denotes releases that did not chart

=== Year-end charts ===
Chart (2012)	Position
US Billboard 200	30
US Top Country Albums (Billboard)	9
US Independent Albums (Billboard)	4

Chart (2013)	Position
US Billboard 200	18
US Top Country Albums (Billboard)	5
US Independent Albums (Billboard)	4

Chart (2014)	Position
US Billboard 200	78
US Top Country Albums (Billboard)	15
US Independent Albums (Billboard)	8

=== Decade-end charts ===
Chart (2010–2019)	Position
US Billboard 200	103

=== Certifications ===
Region	Certification	Certified units/sales
Canada (Music Canada)	Platinum	80,000^{^}
United States (RIAA)	2× Platinum	2,000,000 / 1,750,000
^{^} Shipments figures based on certification alone.
