= Dirt Road Anthem =

2011 single by Jason Aldean

Single by Jason Aldean

from the album My Kinda Party
- Released: April 4, 2011
- Recorded: 2010
- Genre: Country rap
- Length: 3:50
- Label: Broken Bow
- Songwriters: Brantley Gilbert; Colt Ford
- Producer: Michael Knox

Jason Aldean singles chronology
"Don't You Wanna Stay" (2010)	"Dirt Road Anthem" (2011)	"Tattoos on This Town" (2011)

Alternative cover

Music video
- "Dirt Road Anthem" on YouTube

"Dirt Road Anthem" is a country rap song written and sung by American singers Colt Ford and Brantley Gilbert first (who also wrote Aldean's hit "My Kinda Party"), each of whom recorded his own version of the song. Jason Aldean covered the song for his 2010 album My Kinda Party, and released it as the third single from the album in April 2011. The song debuted as a single as Aldean's previous single, "Don't You Wanna Stay", was at the number one spot on the Billboard Hot Country Songs chart. On November 30, the song received a nomination at the 54th Annual Grammy Awards for Best Country Solo Performance. It is the best-selling song in digital history by a male country solo artist in the United States with over four million sold and was certified twelve-times Platinum.

== Content ==
"Dirt Road Anthem" is a mid-tempo country rap song. The song expresses country pride, southern values, and remembering good times from the past.

Country rapper Colt Ford originally recorded the song for his 2008 album Ride Through the Country, with Brantley Gilbert singing vocals on the chorus. Gilbert later recorded a revisited version of the song for his 2010 album Halfway to Heaven with Ford on guest vocals.

According to The Boot, Aldean's publicist teased about the song, suggesting Aldean listened to "a little Snoop Dogg in his time;" regarding the song, Aldean said he did not consider "Dirt Road Anthem" a rap song. He continued by saying, "...if I was to do anything like that, it's not going to be like Kanye West-style or anything."

The song is written in the key of D major with a tempo of 63 beats per minute.

== Remix ==
"Dirt Road Anthem"

Promotional single by Jason Aldean featuring Ludacris
- Released: June 9, 2011
- Genre: Country rap
- Length: 3:54
- Label: Broken Bow
- Songwriters: Brantley Gilbert; Colt Ford; Ludacris
- Producer: Michael Knox

At the 2011 CMT Music Awards, Aldean performed the song with guest rapper Ludacris, who joined Aldean onstage after the second chorus to perform his own hip hop-style second verse. On picking Ludacris for the collaboration, Aldean said, "...even though our music is totally different, our roots are the same. We both know about hot Georgia summers and cooling off with a six pack or two. It wasn't that much of a stretch." A remixed studio version featuring Ludacris was released for digital download through iTunes on June 9, 2011.

== Critical reception ==
"Dirt Road Anthem" has received overall mixed reception from music critics. Matt Bjorke of Roughstock gave "Dirt Road Anthem" a 4.5-star rating, saying, "Jason Aldean knows he’s not a rapper and this isn’t a style of music that he’ll continuously do...but as for a new song with a different sound, it certainly works." Kevin John Coyne of Country Universe gave the song a D grade, using heavy sarcasm to acknowledge that the song's content followed tired, formulaic patterns often used in other country songs.

== Music video ==
The music video for "Dirt Road Anthem", directed by Deaton-Flanigen Productions, premiered June 13, 2011 on CMT. The video was entirely shot in black-and-white, portraying Aldean driving a Ram pickup truck through the countryside and stopping at a clearance where he reminisces of his teenage years of partying with friends around a campfire. The video for "Dirt Road Anthem" was filmed around Old Hickory, Tennessee (a suburb of Nashville). The twin bridges are crossing the Cumberland River, and the factory scene, railroad beds and small town were filmed around Rayon City. Some scenes were in or near Rayon City but it is actually a part of Old Hickory. The laundromat that is driven by is in Old Hickory proper.

== Commercial performance ==
The song debuted at number 57 on the US Billboard Hot Country Songs chart for the chart week dated February 5, 2011, as an album cut from unsolicited airplay. "Dirt Road Anthem" had reached a peak of number 49 before being released as a single in April 2011. The song later became Aldean's sixth number one hit on the Hot Country Songs chart the week of July 30, 2011. It also debuted at number 68 on the US Billboard Hot 100 chart for the week of April 23, 2011. It has since become his first Top 10 hit on that chart, and his highest-charting single at the time. It also debuted at number 92 on the Canadian Hot 100 chart for the week of May 28, 2011.

In September 2011, the song became the first for a male solo country artist to top the two million mark in digital sales. By March 2014, the song has sold over four million digital downloads, making it then the seventh best-selling country song in the US, and the best-selling song by a male country solo artist in digital history. As of April 2014, it has sold 4,027,000 copies in the US. In 2026, it was certified twelve-times platinum.

== Charts ==
=== Weekly charts ===
Chart (2011)	Peak position
Canada Country (Billboard)	1
Canada Hot 100 (Billboard)	39
US Billboard Hot 100	7
US Hot Country Songs (Billboard)	1

=== Year-end charts ===
Chart (2011)	Position
US Billboard Hot 100	43
US Country Songs (Billboard)	25

Chart (2012)	Position
US Ringtones (Billboard)	4

== Certifications ==
Region	Certification	Certified units/sales
New Zealand (RMNZ)	Gold	15,000^{‡}
United States (RIAA)	12× Platinum	4,027,000
^{‡} Sales+streaming figures based on certification alone.

== Usage in media ==
"Dirt Road Anthem" was briefly featured in the 2016 drama-thriller film Patriots Day, directed by Peter Berg and starring Mark Wahlberg.
