= Pegasus News =

- Pegasus News homepage on February 4, 2013
- Website type: Hyperlocal news
- Available in: English
- Owner: The Dallas Morning News
- Website: www.pegasusnews.com
- Commercial: yes
- Registration: optional
- Launched: December 2006
- Current status: defunct

Pegasus News was an online-only hyperlocal news source serving the Dallas–Fort Worth region, founded by Mike Orren.

Originally owned by PanLocal Media LLC, the site pioneered several features now common in news platforms, including customized content per-user, programmatic advertising, content curation from partner sites and tight integration of advertising and editorial within a single content management system.

In 2007 the website was acquired by Fisher Communications, who announced plans to adapt the Pegasus model for the websites of their television stations.

In 2008, Pegasus News won both a Katie Award from the Dallas Press Club and an Eppy Award from Editor & Publisher for "Best Web Site".

In 2009, Gap Communications, a company specializing in mid-sized radio markets, acquired Pegasus News.

In July 2012, Pegasus News was acquired by The Dallas Morning News. The website was ultimately shut down in February 2014.
