= Fly Over States =

Single by Jason Aldean

from the album My Kinda Party
- Released: February 6, 2012
- Recorded: 2010
- Genre: Country
- Length: 3:38
- Label: Broken Bow
- Songwriters: Neil Thrasher; Michael Dulaney
- Producer: Michael Knox

Jason Aldean singles chronology
"Tattoos on This Town" (2011)	"Fly Over States" (2012)	"Take a Little Ride" (2012)

Music video
- "Fly Over States" on YouTube

"Fly Over States" is a song written by Neil Thrasher and Michael Dulaney and recorded by American country music artist Jason Aldean. It was released in February 2012 as the fifth and final single from his 2010 album My Kinda Party and the fifteenth one of his career. In May 2012, it became his seventh number one hit as well as his fourteenth top 10 hit and his ninth consecutive top 5.

== Content ==
The title references the term flyover states, often associated with the Southern and Midwestern United States. The singer tells the story of two men on a first class flight "from New York to Los Angeles", discussing who would want to live in the land they are seeing down below and saying that the land is "in the middle of nowhere." The singer though goes on to say that these men have never been to these places or met the people who live and work in these towns, that if they had, they'd "understand why God made those fly over states."

== Critical reception ==
Billy Dukes from Taste of Country gave "Fly Over States" four stars out of five. He ended the review, "Aldean hasn’t released many songs like this, choosing instead to share the rowdy, but easily digestible, country-rock anthems and a few heavy love songs. It’s doubtful he’ll offer more like ‘Fly Over States’ in the future, as the song is not likely to climb charts or sell singles as quickly as hits like ‘My Kinda Party.’ There will still be a large audience that just doesn't get it, but those who do (especially those who live it) may find a new favorite song."

Kevin John Coyne from Country Universe graded the song a B+. He said during the review, "In the American media, big city life is pretty much all that’s depicted. There aren’t news networks and situation comedies and international magazines being beamed in from those fly over states. Everybody in America knows what New York City looks like, but there are small towns across the country that will always remain nameless and faceless to all but the few who live there or pass through them."

== Music video ==
The music video for "Fly Over States" premiered on March 16, 2012 on CMT. The video was directed by Wes Edwards, one of Aldean's usual directors of choice. Throughout the video, Jason is shown in an empty airplane. Jason and his band are also shown in an airplane graveyard performing the song. It also shows different scenes that refer to the lyrics including the Badlands woman from Amarillo and two men from Nashville, Tennessee. At the end of the video, the camera looks up into the night sky after one last look at the graveyard.

== Chart performance ==
"Fly Over States" debuted at number 59 on Billboard's Hot Country Songs chart for the week of January 14, 2012. It also debuted at number 92 on the U.S. Billboard Hot 100 chart for the week of March 10, 2012. It also debuted at number 98 on Canadian Hot 100 chart for the week of April 14, 2012. On the country chart dated May 26, 2012, it became Aldean's seventh number-one single.

Chart (2012)	Peak position
Canada Country (Billboard)	4
Canada Hot 100 (Billboard)	55
US Billboard Hot 100	32
US Hot Country Songs (Billboard)	1

=== Year-end charts ===
Chart (2012)	Position
US Billboard Hot 100	98
US Country Songs (Billboard)	26

== Certifications ==
Region	Certification	Certified units/sales
United States (RIAA)	4× Platinum	4,000,000^{‡}
^{‡} Sales+streaming figures based on certification alone.
