= Night Train (Jason Aldean song) =

Single by Jason Aldean

from the album Night Train
- Released: June 24, 2013
- Recorded: 2012
- Genre: Country
- Length: 3:52
- Label: Broken Bow
- Songwriters: Neil Thrasher; Michael Dulaney
- Producer: Michael Knox

Jason Aldean singles chronology
"1994" (2013)	"Night Train" (2013)	"Drivin' Around Song" (2013)

"Night Train" is a song written by Neil Thrasher and Michael Dulaney and recorded by American country music artist Jason Aldean. It was released in June 2013 as the fourth single and title track from his 2012 album of the same name.

== Content ==
"Night Train" is a mid-tempo rock ballad about two lovers finding the perfect spot for romance at night while waiting for a train to pass by.

== Critical reception ==
Billy Dukes of Taste of Country gave "Night Train" three out of five stars. He stated, "the lyrics aren’t as vivid as some of Aldean’s better ballads, but his performance feels inspired by some real place and love from his past." He also said, "Aldean shows real vocal power and that this song is a nice reminder of what he’s capable of."

== Live performances ==
Jason Aldean debuted the new single on June 5, 2013 at the CMT Music Awards.

== Music video ==
The music video was directed by Wes Edwards and premiered on August 6, 2013.

== Commercial performance ==
The song entered the Billboard Hot 100 at No. 92, and the Hot Country Songs chart at No. 26 for the week that the album Night Train was released. It dropped from the chart until the song was released to radio as a single, and re-entered the Billboard Hot 100 at No. 90 for the charted dated July 27, 2013. It peaked at No. 26 on the Billboard Hot 100 for the charted dated October 12, 2013. The song has reached its million sales mark in the US by April 2014.

The song debuted at No. 85 on the Canadian Hot 100 chart for the week the album was released. It peaked at No. 39.

== Charts and certifications ==
=== Weekly charts ===
Chart (2013)	Peak position
Canada Hot 100 (Billboard)	39
Canada Country (Billboard)	1
US Billboard Hot 100	26
US Hot Country Songs (Billboard)	2
US Country Airplay (Billboard)	1

=== Year-end charts ===
Chart (2013)	Position
US Country Airplay (Billboard)	10
US Hot Country Songs (Billboard)	22
US Radio Songs (Billboard)	67

=== Certifications ===
Region	Certification	Certified units/sales
Canada (Music Canada)	Gold	40,000^{*}
United States (RIAA)	Platinum	1,007,000
^{*} Sales figures based on certification alone.
