= When She Says Baby =

Single by Jason Aldean

from the album Night Train
- Released: November 18, 2013
- Recorded: 2012
- Genre: Country
- Length: 2:51
- Label: Broken Bow
- Songwriters: Rhett Akins; Ben Hayslip
- Producer: Michael Knox

Jason Aldean singles chronology
"Drivin' Around Song" (2013)	"When She Says Baby" (2013)	"Burnin' It Down" (2014)

"When She Says Baby" is a song written by Rhett Akins and Ben Hayslip and recorded by American country music artist Jason Aldean. It was released in November 2013 as the fifth and final single from Aldean's 2012 album Night Train.

== Critical reception ==
The song received a favorable review from Taste of Country, which said that "it speaks to the masses with lyrics that are easy to relate to."

== Music video ==
The music video was taken from Aldean's Night Train to Georgia DVD, filmed at the University of Georgia's Sanford Stadium. It premiered on the CMT Hot 20 Countdown on November 16, 2013.

== History ==
=== Commercial performance ===
"When She Says Baby" debuted at No. 58 on the U.S. Billboard Country Airplay chart for the week of November 9, 2013. It also debuted at No. 33 on the U.S. Billboard Hot Country Songs chart for the week of November 3, 2012 as an album track. It also debuted at No. 93 on the U.S. Billboard Hot 100 chart for the week of December 14, 2013. The song has sold 711,000 copies in the U.S. as of April 2014.

The song debuted at No. 76 on the Canadian Hot 100 chart for the week of December 21, 2013.

=== Las Vegas shooting ===
On October 1, 2017, a gunman, identified as 64-year-old Stephen Paddock of Mesquite, Nevada opened fire on the audience at a country music festival being held on the Las Vegas Strip in Paradise, Nevada, headlined by Aldean, Eric Church and Sam Hunt. The shooting began when Aldean, who was serving as the festival's closing act, started performing the song.

== Charts and certifications ==
=== Weekly charts ===
Chart (2013–2014)	Peak position
Canada Hot 100 (Billboard)	43
Canada Country (Billboard)	1
US Billboard Hot 100	38
US Country Airplay (Billboard)	1
US Hot Country Songs (Billboard)	2

=== Year-end charts ===
Chart (2014)	Position
US Country Airplay (Billboard)	12
US Hot Country Songs (Billboard)	28

=== Certifications ===
Region	Certification	Certified units/sales
United States (RIAA)	Platinum	1,000,000^{‡}
^{‡} Sales+streaming figures based on certification alone.
