= Take a Little Ride =

Single by Jason Aldean

from the album Night Train
- Released: July 16, 2012
- Recorded: 2012
- Genre: Country
- Length: 3:08
- Label: Broken Bow
- Songwriters: Dylan Altman; Jim McCormick; Rodney Clawson
- Producer: Michael Knox

Jason Aldean singles chronology
"Fly Over States" (2012)	"Take a Little Ride" (2012)	"The Only Way I Know" (2012)

"Take a Little Ride" is a song written by Dylan Altman, Rodney Clawson and Jim McCormick and recorded by American country music artist Jason Aldean. It was released on July 16, 2012, as the first single from his fifth studio album Night Train.

== Content ==
The song "Take a Little Ride" revolves around the happenings of a man getting off work and going to pick up his love interest that night to take her out for a drive in his Chevy truck. It is in the key of A major with a chord pattern of E-G-D-A.

Eight days after the song's release, Broken Bow Records released a re-recording of the song, in which the line "a little Shiner Bock" is changed to "a couple Rocky Tops", in reference to Coors beer. This re-recording was done because Aldean had signed an endorsement deal with Coors.

== Critical reception ==
Billy Dukes of Taste of Country gave "Take a Little Ride" a four-star review, praising the song's "colorful" and "welcoming" verses, and stating how "ballads like 'Laughed Until We Cried' balance rockers like 'She's Country,' but he’s at his best on songs that find the sweet middle". It received three out of five stars from Jessica Nicholson of Country Weekly, who thought that the lyrics were "a little generic" but said that the "in-your-face production and signature Southern rock groove combine to make this unmistakably Jason's."

Matt Bjorke of Roughstock gave the song a four-star review, saying that Aldean was "relaxed, confident, and deliver[ed] a song that fits exactly what we've come to expect from a superstar."

== Music video ==
The music video was directed by Shaun Silva and premiered on August 10, 2012.

== Accolades ==
Awards and nominations for "Take a Little Ride"
Organization	Year	Category	Result
CMT Music Awards	2013	Male Video of the Year	Nominated
American Country Awards	2013	Music Video of the Year: Male	Nominated

== Personnel ==
- Jason Aldean – lead vocals
- Kurt Allison – electric guitar
- Tully Kennedy – bass guitar
- Luke Laird – drum programming
- Rob McNelley – electric guitar
- Danny Rader – banjo, 12-string guitar, mandolin
- Rich Redmond – drums, percussion
- Neil Thrasher – background vocals

== Chart performance ==
"Take a Little Ride" debuted at number 19 on the Billboard Country Songs chart for the week of August 4, 2012. It also debuted on the Billboard Hot 100 chart at number 12, and the Canadian Hot 100 chart at number 22 the same week, Aldean's highest debut in Canada thus far. The song also made history on Country Digital Songs, moving 189,000 downloads during the tracking week ending July 22, marking the biggest opening week by a male artist. On the country chart dated October 6, 2012, "Take a Little Ride" became his eighth number-one single. The song has sold over a million digital downloads as of January 2013.

"Take a Little Ride" was the first number one hit published under the Country Airplay banner for the week of October 20, 2012, as Billboard had changed the methodology of Hot Country Songs to incorporate sales and streaming for that week, while launching a second chart based only on country radio airplay. That same week, on the newly reformed Hot Country Songs chart, the song was knocked off by Taylor Swift's "We Are Never Ever Getting Back Together" which rose from number 21 to number 1 on the same chart and stayed at number one for 9 weeks.

Chart (2012)	Peak position
Canada Country (Billboard)	1
Canada Hot 100 (Billboard)	22
US Billboard Hot 100	12
US Country Airplay (Billboard)	1
US Hot Country Songs (Billboard)	1

=== Year-end charts ===
Chart (2012)	Position
US Billboard Hot 100	88
US Country Songs (Billboard)	31

== Certifications ==
Region	Certification	Certified units/sales
United States (RIAA)	Platinum	1,000,000^{*}
^{*} Sales figures based on certification alone.
