= Tattoos on This Town =

Single by Jason Aldean

from the album My Kinda Party
- Released: September 5, 2011
- Recorded: 2010
- Genre: Country rock
- Length: 3:23
- Label: Broken Bow
- Songwriters: Michael Dulaney; Wendell Mobley; Neil Thrasher
- Producer: Michael Knox

Jason Aldean singles chronology
"Dirt Road Anthem" (2011)	"Tattoos on This Town" (2011)	"Fly Over States" (2012)

"Tattoos on This Town" is a song written by Michael Dulaney, Wendell Mobley, and Neil Thrasher and recorded by American country music artist Jason Aldean. It was released on September 5, 2011, as the fourth single from Aldean's 2010 album My Kinda Party.

== History and content ==
"Tattoos on This Town" is a moderate up-tempo country rock song in which the narrator reflects on the effect growing up in his home town had on him and those he grew up with (friends or significant other is never directly acknowledged) by revisiting events of their lives and expressing them in a metaphoric tattoo on the town and eventually on themselves and who they are. Of the song, Aldean said, "[The song] reminds me of where I’m from, and some of the stuff I did when I was growing up. That was one of the things that was appealing about the song when I heard it the first time. It’s nice to sing songs like that and tell those stories that make me go back and remember those days of being in high school and doing stuff that you probably should have gotten in trouble for, but luckily you didn’t get caught."

== Critical reception ==
The song has received generally positive reviews from music critics. Billy Dukes of Taste of Country gave the song 4.5 out of 5 stars, praising Aldean's performance and comparing the song to many of his previous hits, saying how this song "runs parallel to our own tales of mischief, lost innocence and heartache". Ben Foster of Country Universe gave the song a B grade, praising the song's lyrical construction, as well as how it "succeeds due to the fact that it rises about the superficial idealization and cliché formulas that have bogged down a great deal of Aldean’s material".

== Music video ==
The accompanying music video for the song was directed by Wes Edwards. It debuted for download on iTunes on September 20, 2011. It then premiered on YouTube on September 22, and on CMT and GAC on September 26.

The video portrays a young couple's love story, starting from their teenage years, fast-forwarding through marriage and settling down, all the way to the young man's leaving for war. Some time later, his wife is paid a visit by two Marines who inform her about the death of her husband. It then fast-forwards through the young widow's life, in which she attends her husband's funeral and also gives birth to a son. As the video ends, the son, now a young boy (wearing his late father's old cap), throws a stone into the lake near the tree where his parents had carved "I Love You" many years before. Throughout the video, Aldean and his band perform inside an aircraft hangar, filmed in Smyrna, Tennessee.

== Chart performance ==
"Tattoos on This Town" debuted at number 18 on Billboard's Bubbling Under Hot 100 chart in 2010 as an album cut based on downloads. Upon its release as a single, the song debuted at number 59 on the Billboard Hot Country Songs chart the week of August 27, 2011 and peaked at number 2 in December of that year, remaining there for six weeks and having been blocked from number one by Brantley Gilbert's "Country Must Be Country Wide", Lady Antebellum's "We Owned the Night", and Zac Brown Band's "Keep Me in Mind", making it his thirteenth top ten hit on this chart. It also debuted at number 81 on the Billboard Hot 100 chart the week of October 8, 2011 and has peaked at number 38, his fourth consecutive top 40 hit on this chart and seventh overall. Most recently, it debuted at number 96 on the Canadian Hot 100 and peaked at number 59. The song has sold 754,000 digital downloads as of May 2, 2012.

Chart (2011–2012)	Peak position
US Hot Country Songs (Billboard)	2
US Billboard Hot 100	38
Canada Hot 100 (Billboard)	59
Canada Country (Billboard)	1

=== Year-end charts ===
Chart (2011)	Position
US Country Songs (Billboard)	64

Chart (2012)	Position
US Country Songs (Billboard)	49

== Certifications ==
Region	Certification	Certified units/sales
United States (RIAA)	2× Platinum	2,000,000^{‡}
^{‡} Sales+streaming figures based on certification alone.
