= My Kinda Party (song) =

Single by Jason Aldean

from the album My Kinda Party
- Released: August 16, 2010
- Recorded: 2010
- Genre: Country rock
- Length: 3:54 (radio edit); 4:44 (album version)
- Label: Broken Bow
- Songwriter: Brantley Gilbert
- Producer: Michael Knox

Jason Aldean singles chronology
"Crazy Town" (2010)	"My Kinda Party" (2010)	"Don't You Wanna Stay" (2010)

"My Kinda Party" is a song written and originally recorded by American country rock artist Brantley Gilbert from his 2009 album A Modern Day Prodigal Son. Jason Aldean covered the song and his version serves as the lead-off single to his 2010 album of the same name.

== Content ==
This song is an up-tempo country rock song about a guy who's "worked all week" asking a girl out for a tailgate party and bonfire, and asking her to stay the night with him afterwards.

== Critical reception ==
This song has received overall mixed critical reception. Amar Toor of AOL Radio Blog gave this song a positive review, saying "Jason Aldean's new song, 'My Kinda Party,' is a raucous, feel-good bit of country that's absolutely perfect for getting your late summer party poppin'." A positive review also came from Deborah Evans Price of Billboard, who called it a "revved-up salute to backwoods party life", while praising Aldean's vocals and the "muscular guitar licks". Kevin John Coyne of Country Universe gave "My Kinda Party" a C rating, saying that it seemed too similar to Aldean's earlier up-tempos such as "Hicktown" or "She's Country." Matt Bjorke of Roughstock gave this song a four-star rating out of five, saying "My Kinda Party" "is the exact kind of song that suits Aldean’s voice the best" and "melodically the song fits right in with Jason Aldean’s hits like “She’s Country” “Johnny Cash” and “Hicktown” as the song is thoroughly a modern country rocker but the difference between it and those three is that the song isn’t nearly as ‘hard-edged’ as those songs were."

== Music video ==
The music video debuted on the weekend of October 1, 2010 on CMT's Big New Music Weekend. The video was directed by Ryan Smith.

== Chart performance ==
The song debuted at number 41 on the U.S. Billboard Hot Country Songs chart for the chart week dated August 21, 2010, and entered the top 40 in its second chart week. It also debuted at number 54 on the U.S. Billboard Hot 100 chart for the week of September 11, 2010. It also debuted at number 99 on the Canadian Hot 100 chart for the week of November 20, 2010. As of June 2011, My Kinda Party was sold 1,000,000 times in the United States.

Chart (2010–2011)	Peak position
Canada Country (Billboard)	13
Canada Hot 100 (Billboard)	99
US Billboard Hot 100	39
US Hot Country Songs (Billboard)	2

=== Year-end charts ===
Chart (2011)	Position
US Country Songs (Billboard)	53

== Certifications ==
Region	Certification	Certified units/sales
United States (RIAA)	5× Platinum	5,000,000^{‡}
^{‡} Sales+streaming figures based on certification alone.
