= 1994 (song) =

Single by Jason Aldean

from the album Night Train
- Released: March 11, 2013
- Recorded: 2012
- Genre: Country
- Length: 4:03 (album version); 2:52 (radio edit)
- Label: Broken Bow
- Songwriters: Thomas Rhett; Luke Laird; Barry Dean
- Producer: Michael Knox

Jason Aldean singles chronology
"The Only Way I Know" (2012)	"1994" (2013)	"Night Train" (2013)

"1994" is a song written by Thomas Rhett, Luke Laird, and Barry Dean and recorded by American country music artist Jason Aldean. It was released in March 2013 as the third single from Aldean's 2012 album Night Train. A tribute to Joe Diffie referencing many of his songs, the song has received mixed reviews from music critics. The song peaked at numbers 10 and 14 on the US Billboard Hot Country Songs and Country Airplay charts respectively. It also reached number 52 on the Billboard Hot 100. The song was certified Gold by the Recording Industry Association of America (RIAA), denoting sales of over 500,000 units in that country. It garnered similar chart success in Canada, reaching number 18 on the Country chart and number 65 on the Canadian Hot 100 chart.

The accompanying music video for the song was directed by Wes Edwards.

== Content ==
The song, a tribute to Joe Diffie, refers to many of his songs: "Third Rock from the Sun", "John Deere Green", "Ships That Don't Come In", "Honky Tonk Attitude", "Pickup Man", "So Help Me Girl", "A Night to Remember", and "C-O-U-N-T-R-Y".

Upon being sent a copy of the song by Billboard, Diffie said, "What else can you say but what an honor it is to have the larger part of a song reference songs of mine. To think all of Jason's fans will be chanting my name... pretty dang cool." He also praised Aldean's overall musical styles, saying that Aldean is "pushing the envelope".

== Critical reception ==
The song has received mixed reviews from music critics. Tammy Ragusa of Country Weekly gave it a B+ grade, saying that it "serves to further his penchant for upping the musical ante", also praising the musical arrangement and calling the song "pure fun". In her review of Night Train, Jewly Hight of American Songwriter said that the song was "as ridiculous, and fun, a song as Aldean’s ever done."

Billy Dukes of Taste of Country gave the song a one-star review, saying that "Aldean’s recording would lead one to believe 1994 was a watershed year in country music. It wasn't." Ben Foster of Country Universe gave the song an F grade, saying that its lyrics "comprise little more than a hodgepodge of radio-baiting backwoods clichés" and "are so haphazardly thrown together that’s it’s hard to tell what the song is even meant to be about."

== Music video ==
The music video was directed by Wes Edwards and premiered on CMT on March 25, 2013. The music video starts off with two women going into a coin-operated photo booth. When they put in a coin, the song begins. The music video features country music artists Lady Antebellum, Luke Bryan, Florida Georgia Line, Dierks Bentley, Hayden Panettiere, co-writer Thomas Rhett, Little Big Town, and Jake Owen and has scenes of Aldean performing at a barn party.

== Chart performance ==
"1994" debuted at number 42 on the Billboard Country Songs chart for the week ending of March 9, 2013. On the Country Airplay chart for the week ending of March 2, 2013, it debuted at number 60. It also debuted at number 93 on the U.S. Billboard Hot 100 chart for the week of March 30, 2013. It also debuted at number 100 on the Canadian Hot 100 chart for the week of April 13, 2013. It peaked at number 14 on the Country Airplay chart dated May 4, 2013, making it Aldean's first single to miss the top 10 since 2008's "Relentless" and the second-lowest-peaking single of his career.

== Track listing ==
US CD single
No.	Title	Length
1.	"1994" (Radio Edit)	2:52
2.	"1994" (Album Version)	4:01
3.	"1994" (Suggested Callout Research Hook)	0:13
Total length:		7:05

== Charts and certifications ==
=== Charts ===
Chart (2013)	Peak position
Canada Hot 100 (Billboard)	65
Canada Country (Billboard)	18
US Billboard Hot 100	52
US Hot Country Songs (Billboard)	10
US Country Airplay (Billboard)	14

=== Year-end charts ===
Chart (2013)	Position
US Country Airplay (Billboard)	74
US Hot Country Songs (Billboard)	53

=== Certifications ===
Region	Certification	Certified units/sales
United States (RIAA)	Gold	500,000^{‡}
^{‡} Sales+streaming figures based on certification alone.
