= The Only Way I Know =

Single by Jason Aldean with Luke Bryan and Eric Church

from the album Night Train
- Released: November 12, 2012
- Recorded: 2012
- Genre: Country rock; spoken word
- Length: 3:13
- Label: Broken Bow
- Songwriters: David Lee Murphy; Ben Hayslip
- Producer: Michael Knox

Jason Aldean singles chronology
| "Take a Little Ride" (2012) | "The Only Way I Know" (2012) | "1994" (2013) |

Luke Bryan singles chronology
| "Kiss Tomorrow Goodbye" (2012) | "The Only Way I Know" (2012) | "Crash My Party" (2013) |

Eric Church singles chronology
| "Creepin'" (2012) | "The Only Way I Know" (2012) | "Like Jesus Does" (2013) |

"The Only Way I Know" is a song written by David Lee Murphy and Ben Hayslip and recorded by American country music artist Jason Aldean featuring Luke Bryan and Eric Church. It was released in November 2012 as the second single from Aldean's 2012 album Night Train.

== Content ==
This song is about hard work, loyalty, small town values, and southern work ethic. The singers explain that they were raised in a small town southern atmosphere and were taught to work hard to earn a living. They had not realized that other lifestyles existed and were practiced and the one by which they grew up is "the only way [they] know." The song's verses are largely spoken-word, with Aldean on the first verse, Bryan on the second, and Church on the third. Aldean also sings the choruses.

== Critical reception ==
Billy Dukes of Taste of Country gave "The Only Way I Know" a four-star review, saying that it "sounds best at neighbor-irritating volumes." Ashley Cooke of Roughstock also gave the song a four-star review, stating that the song "has a powerful chorus which allows listeners to get a little rowdy and let their inner badass out." Conversely, Tara Seetharam of Country Universe gave the song a D, stating "the song sinks because of its empty lyrics, its jarring theme of “humble pride” against a needlessly aggressive arrangement, and its subtle implication that a work ethic cut from a different cloth than the narrators’ is a lesser one."

== Live performances ==
Aldean, Bryan, and Church opened the 46th Country Music Association Awards with "The Only Way I Know" on November 1, 2012, and received a standing ovation. On November 13, 2012, Aldean performed the song on NBC's The Voice. Two contestants, Bryan Keith and Dez Duron joined him for the performance doing Luke Bryan's and Church's vocal parts.

== Music video ==
Footage from the 46th Country Music Association Award performance were used to comprise a music video for "The Only Way I Know", directed by Paul Miller.

== Commercial performance ==
"The Only Way I Know" debuted at number 28 on the U.S. Billboard Hot Country Songs chart and number 63 on the Canadian Hot 100 chart for the week of November 3, 2012, as an album cut from downloads. It also debuted at number 93 on the Billboard Hot 100 chart for the week of November 24, 2012. On the Country Airplay chart dated of February 16, 2013, the song reached number one, becoming Aldean's ninth number one hit, Bryan's sixth, and Church's third. It was certified Platinum by the RIAA on February 12, 2014, for a million units in sales.

== Charts and certifications ==
| Chart (2012–2013) | Peak position |
|---|---|
| Canada Hot 100 (Billboard) | 53 |
| Canada Country (Billboard) | 2 |
| US Billboard Hot 100 | 40 |
| US Hot Country Songs (Billboard) | 5 |
| US Country Airplay (Billboard) | 1 |

=== Year-end charts ===
| Chart (2013) | Position |
|---|---|
| US Country Airplay (Billboard) | 42 |
| US Hot Country Songs (Billboard) | 43 |

=== Certifications ===
| Region | Certification | Certified units/sales |
|---|---|---|
| Canada (Music Canada) | Gold | 40,000^{*} |
| United States (RIAA) | Platinum | 1,000,000^{‡} |
^{*} Sales figures based on certification alone.^{‡} Sales+streaming figures based on certification alone.
