= Michael Knox (music producer) =

American music producer

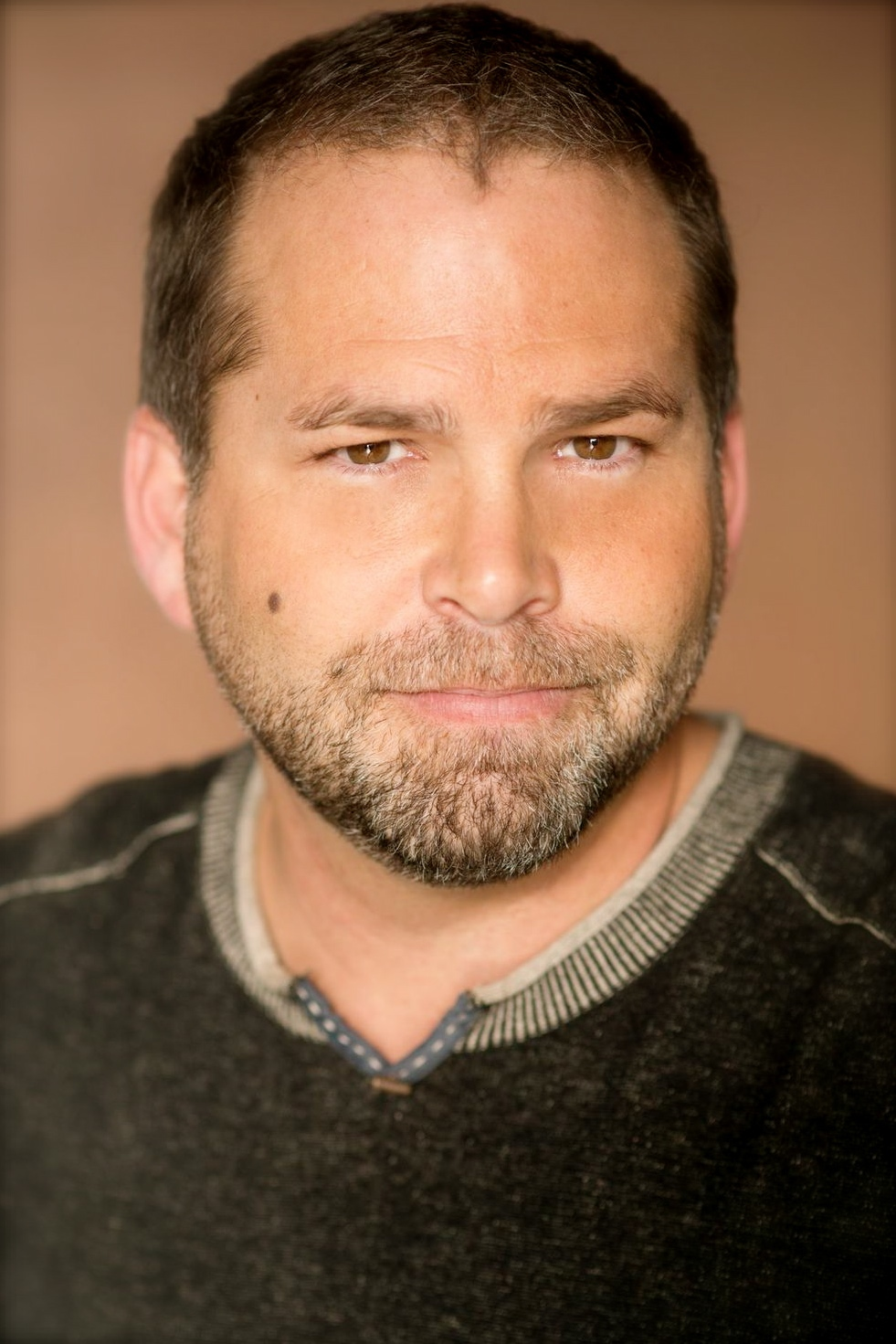

Background information
- Born: Macon, Georgia, U.S.
- Genre: Country
- Occupations: Producer, artist manager
- Years active: 1990s–present
- Website: musicknox.com

Michael Knox is an American music producer and artist manager.

== Biography ==
The Macon, Georgia-born Knox, son of rock and roll singer Buddy Knox, is best known for discovering Jason Aldean and producing all of his albums.

He helped Crossin Dixon sign to Broken Bow Records, the same label to which Aldean is signed, after a friend of his saw the band perform. Other artists whom he has produced include Montgomery Gentry and Trace Adkins.

Before working as a producer, Knox was an executive at Warner/Chappell Music. His first production credit was Danni Leigh's "29 Nights". Knox worked as a song plugger. In 2011, Knox won Album of the Year from the Country Music Association for his production on My Kinda Party. He produced Canadian country artist Sykamore's debut album Pinto in 2022.

== See also ==
- Song recordings produced by Michael Knox
