= Jason Aldean discography =

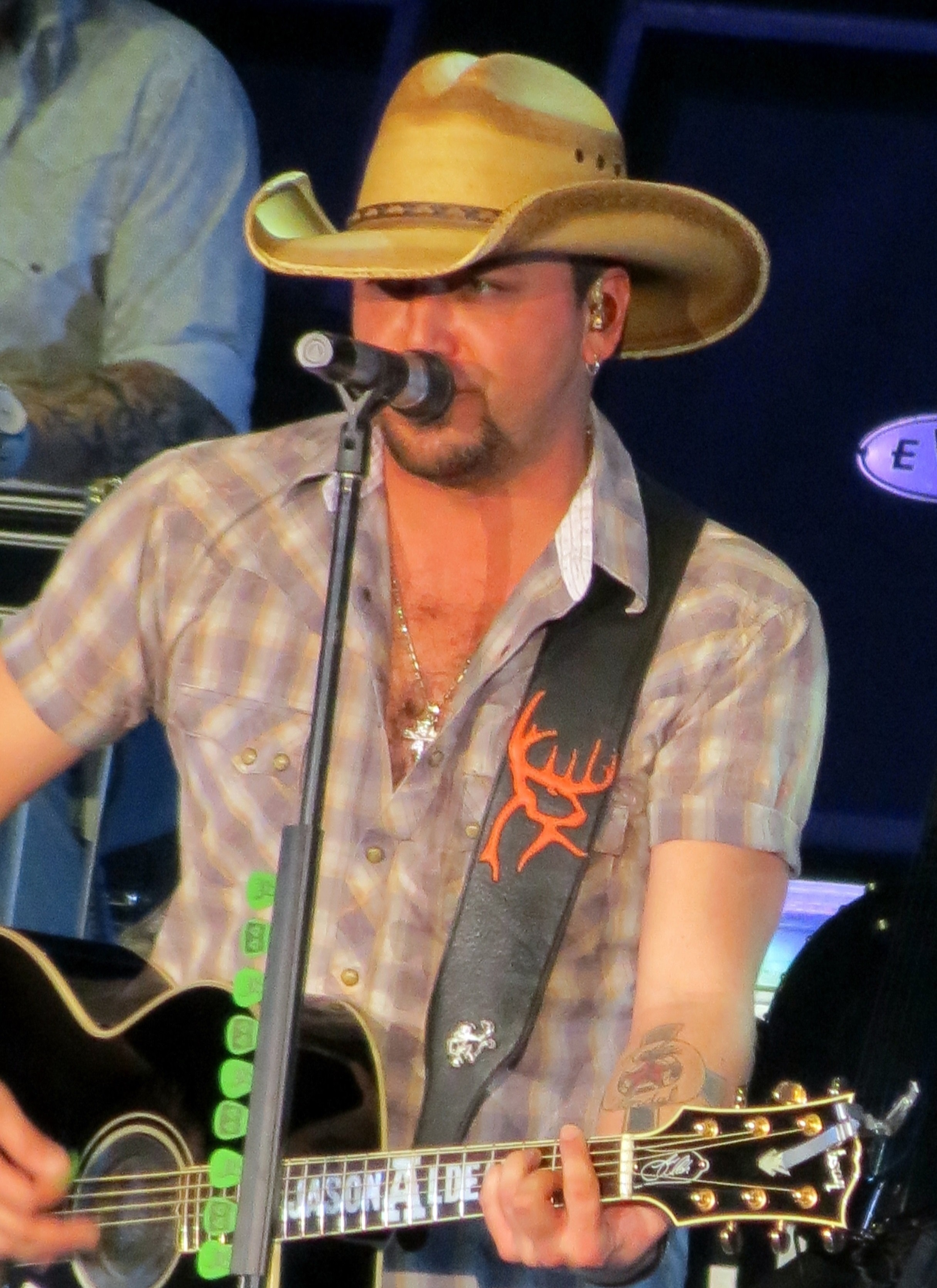
- Studio albums: 12
- Extended plays: 1
- Live albums: 1
- Singles: 44
- Music videos: 37
- Guest singles: 4
- Promotional singles: 4
- Other charted songs: 7
- No. 1 singles: 27

American country music singer Jason Aldean has released twelve studio albums, one extended play, and forty-three solo singles. All of his music has been released through BBR Music Group (formerly known as Broken Bow Records), with Michael Knox as his sole record producer.

Aldean debuted in 2005 with the single "Hicktown", which peaked at number 10 on the Billboard Hot Country Songs chart and number 68 on the Hot 100. He achieved his first number-one single on the former with the song's follow-up "Why" in 2006. "Take a Little Ride" was the first song to reach number one on the Country Airplay chart after it was split from the existing Hot Country Songs charts in 2012. Between Hot Country Songs and Country Airplay, Aldean has a total of 27 solo number-one singles, with a number of these also having reached that position on Canada Country. All but one of his solo singles has entered the Billboard Hot 100 as well, with 2023's "Try That in a Small Town" being his first to reach the number one position there. The song is also his highest peak on the Canadian Hot 100 at number nine. His highest-certified singles are 2010's "Dirt Road Anthem" and 2018's "You Make It Easy", which have both been certified Diamond by the Recording Industry Association of America (RIAA). Aldean's first nine albums are all certified gold or higher by the RIAA, with his highest being a six-times platinum certification for 2010's My Kinda Party.

Aldean has also been featured on a number of collaborative efforts, including singles by Colt Ford, Tyler Farr, and Darius Rucker. In 2016, he was part of the single "Forever Country", a multi-artist collaboration credited to Artists of Then, Now & Forever done to honor the 50th anniversary of the Country Music Association that year. This song also reached number one on Hot Country Songs.

== Studio albums ==
=== 2000s ===
Title	Album details	Peak chart positions			Certifications	Sales
Title	Album details	US	US Country	US Indie	Certifications	Sales
Jason Aldean	Release date: July 26, 2005; Label: Broken Bow; Formats: CD, digital download, vinyl	37	6	2	RIAA: Platinum	US: 1,600,000
Relentless	Release date: May 29, 2007; Label: Broken Bow; Formats: CD, digital download	4	1	1	RIAA: Platinum	US: 1,000,000
Wide Open	Release date: April 7, 2009; Label: Broken Bow; Formats: CD, digital download	4	2	1	RIAA: 2× Platinum	US: 1,400,000

=== 2010s ===
Title	Album details	Peak chart positions					Certifications	Sales
Title	Album details	US	US Country	US Indie	AUS	CAN	Certifications	Sales
My Kinda Party	Release date: November 2, 2010; Label: Broken Bow; Formats: CD, digital download, vinyl	2	1	1	—	15	RIAA: 6× Platinum; MC: Platinum	US: 3,130,000
Night Train	Release date: October 16, 2012; Label: Broken Bow; Formats: CD, digital download	1	1	1	97	1	RIAA: 2× Platinum; MC: Platinum	US: 1,750,000
Old Boots, New Dirt	Release date: October 7, 2014; Label: Broken Bow; Formats: CD, digital download	1	1	1	13	1	RIAA: Platinum	US: 1,150,200; CAN: 16,000
They Don't Know	Release date: September 9, 2016; Label: Broken Bow / Macon; Formats: CD, digital download, vinyl	1	1	1	5	2	RIAA: Platinum; MC: Gold	US: 430,500
Rearview Town	Release date: April 13, 2018; Label: Broken Bow / Macon; Formats: CD, digital download, streaming	1	1	1	10	2	RIAA: Platinum; MC: Platinum	US: 500,700
9	Release date: November 22, 2019; Label: Broken Bow / Macon; Formats: CD, vinyl, digital download, streaming	2	1	1	16	14	RIAA: Gold	US: 143,300
"—" denotes releases that did not chart

=== 2020s ===
Title	Album details	Peak chart positions					Sales
Title	Album details	US	US Country	US Indie	AUS	CAN	Sales
Macon	Release date: November 12, 2021; Label: Broken Bow / Macon; Formats: CD, vinyl, digital download, streaming	8	3	1	81	26	US: 19,000
Georgia	Release date: April 22, 2022; Label: Broken Bow / Macon; Formats: CD, vinyl, digital download, streaming	8	2	2	—	35	US: 13,000
Highway Desperado	Released: November 3, 2023; Label: Broken Bow / Macon; Formats: CD, streaming	19	6	4	—	44	
Songs About Us	Released: April 24, 2026; Label: Broken Bow / Macon; Formats: CD, vinyl, streaming	24	6	2	57	—	

== Compilation albums ==
Title	Album details	Peak chart positions		
Title	Album details	US	US Country	CAN
30 Number One Hits	Release date: October 10, 2025; Label: Broken Bow / Macon; Formats: CD, vinyl, digital download, streaming	19	4	55

== Extended plays ==
Title	EP details	Peak positions
Title	EP details	US Country
Live Sessions	Release date: November 23, 2009; Label: Broken Bow; Formats: CD, digital download	43

== Singles ==
=== 2000s ===
Year	Title	Peak chart positions				Certifications	Album
Year	Title	US	US Country	CAN	CAN Country	Certifications	Album
2005	"Hicktown"	68	10	—	27	RIAA: 2× Platinum	Jason Aldean
2005	"Why"	43	1	—	4	RIAA: 2× Platinum	Jason Aldean
2006	"Amarillo Sky"	59	4	—	29	RIAA: 3× Platinum	Jason Aldean
2007	"Johnny Cash"	68	6	—	25	RIAA: Gold	Relentless
2007	"Laughed Until We Cried"	61	6	88	6	RIAA: Gold	Relentless
2008	"Relentless"	— (Note: "Relentless" did not enter the Billboard Hot 100 but peaked at number three on the Bubbling Under Hot 100 chart.)	15	—	47		Relentless
2008	"She's Country"	29	1	90	14	RIAA: 3× Platinum; RMNZ: Gold	Wide Open
2009	"Big Green Tractor"	18	1	54	3	RIAA: 3× Platinum; RMNZ: Gold	Wide Open
2009	"The Truth"	40	1	79	1	RIAA: Platinum	Wide Open
"—" denotes releases that did not chart

=== 2010s ===
Year	Title	Peak chart positions					Certifications	Album
Year	Title	US	US Country	US Country Airplay	CAN	CAN Country	Certifications	Album
2010	"Crazy Town"	51	2		85	3	RIAA: Gold	Wide Open
2010	"My Kinda Party"	39	2		99	13	RIAA: 5× Platinum	My Kinda Party
2010	"Don't You Wanna Stay" (with Kelly Clarkson)	31	1		35	1	RIAA: 3× Platinum	My Kinda Party
2011	"Dirt Road Anthem" (Note: A remix of "Dirt Road Anthem" is credited on the Billboard Hot 100 as Jason Aldean featuring Ludacris.)	7	1		39	4	RIAA: 12× Platinum; RMNZ: Gold	My Kinda Party
2011	"Tattoos on This Town"	38	2		59	1	RIAA: 2× Platinum	My Kinda Party
2012	"Fly Over States"	32	1		55	4	RIAA: 4× Platinum	My Kinda Party
2012	"Take a Little Ride"	12	1		22	1	RIAA: Platinum	Night Train
2012	"The Only Way I Know" (with Luke Bryan and Eric Church)	40	5	1	53	2	RIAA: Platinum; MC: Gold	Night Train
2013	"1994"	52	10	14	65	18	RIAA: Gold	Night Train
2013	"Night Train"	26	2	1	39	1	RIAA: Platinum; MC: Gold	Night Train
2013	"When She Says Baby"	38	2	1	43	1	RIAA: Platinum	Night Train
2014	"Burnin' It Down"	12	1	1	12	2	RIAA: 2× Platinum	Old Boots, New Dirt
2014	"Just Gettin' Started"	54	5	1	44	2	RIAA: Gold	Old Boots, New Dirt
2015	"Tonight Looks Good on You"	46	6	1	32	1	RIAA: Gold	Old Boots, New Dirt
2015	"Gonna Know We Were Here"	54	5	2	52	2	RIAA: Gold	Old Boots, New Dirt
2016	"Lights Come On"	43	3	1	81	3	RIAA: 2× Platinum; MC: Gold	They Don't Know
2016	"A Little More Summertime"	52	5	1	—	2	RIAA: Platinum	They Don't Know
2016	"Any Ol' Barstool"	52	5	1	100	1	RIAA: 3× Platinum; MC: Gold	They Don't Know
2017	"They Don't Know"	67	8	3	—	2		They Don't Know
2018	"You Make It Easy"	28	2	1	63	1	RIAA: Diamond; MC: 3× Platinum; RMNZ: Platinum	Rearview Town
2018	"Drowns the Whiskey" (featuring Miranda Lambert)	32	3	1	53	1	RIAA: Platinum; MC: Gold	Rearview Town
2018	"Girl Like You"	46	5	1	85	1	RIAA: Platinum	Rearview Town
2019	"Rearview Town"	40	4	1	75	1	RIAA: Platinum	Rearview Town
2019	"We Back"	62	8	6	95	1	MC: Gold	9
"—" denotes releases that did not chart

=== 2020s ===
Year	Title	Peak chart positions						Certifications	Album
Year	Title	US	US Country	US Country Airplay	CAN	CAN Country	WW	Certifications	Album
2020	"Got What I Got"	16	2	1	60	1	104	RIAA: 2× Platinum	9
2020	"Blame It on You"	30	5	1	47	1	—		9
2021	"If I Didn't Love You" (with Carrie Underwood)	15	2	1	35	1	44	RIAA: Platinum	Macon, Georgia
2022	"Trouble with a Heartbreak"	32	4	1	61	2	—		Macon, Georgia
2022	"That's What Tequila Does"	77	19	5	—	9	—		Macon, Georgia
2023	"Try That in a Small Town"	1	1	2	9	49	2		Highway Desperado
2023	"Let Your Boys Be Country"	83	22	3	—	10	—		Highway Desperado
2024	"Whiskey Drink"	77	24	2	—	39	—		Highway Desperado
2025	"How Far Does a Goodbye Go"	37	12	1	—	18	—		Songs About Us
2026	"Don't Tell on Me"	34	9	1	58	1	—		Songs About Us
2026	"Anytime Soon"	91	29	11	—	33	—		Songs About Us

=== Guest singles ===
Year	Title	Peak chart positions					Certifications	Album
Year	Title	US	US Country	US Country Airplay	CAN	CAN Country	Certifications	Album
2013	"Drivin' Around Song" (Colt Ford featuring Jason Aldean)	— (Note: "Drivin' Around Song" did not enter the Billboard Hot 100, but peaked at number six on the Bubbling Under Hot 100 Singles chart.)	41	56	—	—	RIAA: Gold	Declaration of Independence
2014	"Burning Bridges" (Ludacris featuring Jason Aldean)	—	—	—	—	—		Burning Bridges EP
2015	"Damn Good Friends" (Tyler Farr featuring Jason Aldean)	—	46	—	—	—		Suffer in Peace
2016	"Southern Boy" (Jordan Rager featuring Jason Aldean)	—	41	37	—	—		Southern Boy EP
2016	"Forever Country" (as Artists of Then, Now & Forever)	21	1	33	25	39	RIAA: Gold	Non-album single
2018	"Straight to Hell" (with Darius Rucker, Luke Bryan, and Charles Kelley)	—	—	40	—	—	RIAA: Gold	When Was the Last Time
2019	"Can't Hide Red" (Florida Georgia Line featuring Jason Aldean)	—	—	—	—	—		Can't Say I Ain't Country
2022	"Rolex on a Redneck" (Brantley Gilbert featuring Jason Aldean)	—	41	—	—	—	RIAA: Gold	So Help Me God
2024	"Friends Like That" (John Morgan featuring Jason Aldean)	57	16	2	74	1		Carolina Blue
"—" denotes releases that did not chart

=== Promotional singles ===
List of promotional singles, showing year released and album name
Title	Year	Album
"I Don't Drink Anymore"	2019	9
"Keeping It Small Town"	2019	9
"Dirt We Were Raised On"	2019	9
"Rock and Roll Cowboy"	2022	Macon, Georgia
"Tough Crowd"	2023	Highway Desperado
"Hard to Love You"	2025	Songs About Us
"Lovin' Me Too Long"	2025	Songs About Us
"Help You Remember"	2025	Songs About Us

== Other charted songs ==
Year	Title	Peak chart positions				Album
Year	Title	US	US Country	US Country Airplay	CAN	Album
2012	"This Nothin' Town"	—	41	54	—	Night Train
2012	"Feel That Again"	—	45	—	—	Night Train
2012	"I Don't Do Lonely Well"	—	47	—	—	Night Train
2012	"Staring at the Sun"	—	49	—	—	Night Train
2014	"Sweet Little Somethin'"	71	17	53	41	Old Boots, New Dirt
2014	"Two Night Town"	76	18	—	66	Old Boots, New Dirt
2015	"Damn Good Friends" (with Tyler Farr)	—	46	—	—	Suffer in Peace
2016	"Reason to Love L.A."	—	49	—	—	They Don't Know
2016	"In Case You Don't Remember"	—	50	—	—	They Don't Know
2016	"The Way a Night Should Feel"	—	35	—	—	They Don't Know
2016	"This Plane Don't Go There"	—	40	—	—	They Don't Know
2017	"I Won't Back Down" (live from Saturday Night Live)	—	47	—	—	Non-album single
2018	"Gettin' Warmed Up"	—	33	—	—	Rearview Town
2018	"High Noon Neon"	—	48	—	—	Rearview Town
2018	"I'll Wait for You"	—	32	—	—	Rearview Town
2018	"Dirt to Dust"	—	50	—	—	Rearview Town
2021	"Small Town Small"	— (Note: "Small Town Small" did not enter the Billboard Hot 100 but peaked at number 22 on the Bubbling Under Hot 100 chart.)	44	—	—	Macon
2021	"Heaven"	—	49	—	— (Note: "Heaven" did not enter the Canadian Hot 100, but peaked at number 46 on the Hot Canadian Digital Song Sales chart.)	Macon
2021	"Whiskey Me Away"	—	46	—	—	Georgia
2022	"Ain't Enough Cowboy"	—	48	—	—	Georgia
2023	"Christmas in Dixie"	—	—	52	—	Non-album single
"—" denotes releases that did not chart

=== Guest appearances ===
- 2015: "Burning Bridges" (Ludacris featuring Jason Aldean) from the album Ludaversal

== Videography ==
=== Video albums ===
Title	Album details	Certifications (sales threshold)
Wide Open Live & More	Release date: August 25, 2009; Label: Eagle Rock; Formats: DVD, Blu-ray	RIAA: Platinum
Night Train to Georgia	Release date: October 15, 2013; Label: Broken Bow; Formats: DVD, Blu-ray	

=== Music videos ===
Year	Title	Director	Ref.
2005	"Hicktown"	Wes Edwards	
2005	"Why"	Wes Edwards	
2006	"Amarillo Sky"	Wes Edwards	
2007	"Johnny Cash"	Wes Edwards	
2007	"Laughed Until We Cried"	Kristin Barlowe	
2008	"Relentless"	Ryan Smith	
2008	"She's Country" (live)	Paul Miller	
2009	"She's Country"	Wes Edwards	
2009	"Big Green Tractor"	Ivan Dudynsky	
2009	"The Truth"	Deaton Flanigen	
2010	"My Kinda Party"	Ryan Smith	
2010	"Don't You Wanna Stay" (with Kelly Clarkson)	Paul Miller	
2011	"Dirt Road Anthem"	Deaton Flanigen	
2011	"Tattoos on This Town"	Wes Edwards	
2012	"Fly Over States"	Wes Edwards	
2012	"Take a Little Ride"	Shaun Silva	
2012	"The Only Way I Know" (live) (with Luke Bryan and Eric Church)	Paul Miller	
2013	"1994"	Wes Edwards	
2013	"Night Train"	Wes Edwards	
2013	"Drivin' Around Song" (with Colt Ford)	Potsy Ponciroli	
2014	"Burnin' It Down"	Wes Edwards	
2015	"Just Gettin' Started" (live)	Joe DeMaio	
2015	"Tonight Looks Good on You"	Mason Dixon	
2015	"Gonna Know We Were Here"	Shaun Silva	
2016	"Lights Come On"	Shaun Silva	
2016	"A Little More Summertime"	Shaun Silva	
2016	"Forever Country" (Artists of Then, Now & Forever)	Joseph Kahn	
2017	"Any Ol' Barstool"	Shaun Silva	
2017	"They Don't Know"	Stephen Shepherd	
2018	"You Make It Easy"	Shaun Silva	
2018	"Straight to Hell" (with Darius Rucker, Charles Kelley & Luke Bryan)	TK McKamy	
2018	"Drowns the Whiskey" (with Miranda Lambert)	Shaun Silva	
2019	"Rearview Town"	Planet Pictures/Scene Three	
2019	"We Back"	Shaun Silva	
2020	"Got What I Got"	Shaun Silva	
2021	"Blame It On You"	Shaun Silva	
2021	"If I Didn't Love You" (with Carrie Underwood)	Shaun Silva	
2022	"Trouble With a Heartbreak"	Shaun Silva	
2023	"Try That in a Small Town"	Shaun Silva	
2023	"Let Your Boys Be Country"	Shaun Silva	
