= 30 Number One Hits =

Compilation album by Jason Aldean
- Released: October 10, 2025
- Genre: Country
- Length: 103:57
- Label: Broken Bow; Macon Music
- Producer: Jason Aldean; Kurt Allison; Tully Kennedy; Michael Knox

Jason Aldean chronology
Highway Desperado (2023)	30 Number One Hits (2025)	Songs About Us (2026)

Professional ratings
Review scores
Source	Rating
AllMusic	3.5/5 stars

30 Number One Hits is the first compilation album by American country music artist Jason Aldean. The album was released on October 10, 2025, via Broken Bow Records and Aldean's Macon Music. It was produced by Michael Knox on all tracks except John Morgan's "Friends Like That", which was co-produced by Aldean, Kurt Allison, and Tully Kennedy.

The album was released after Aldean earned his 30th number-one song, "Whiskey Drink" in 2025.

Upon release, the album debuted at number four on Billboard's Top Country Albums chart and number 21 on the all-genre Billboard 200 with 22,000 album-equivalent units for the week ending October 16, 2025.

== Track listing ==
No.	Title	Writer(s)	Length
1.	"Why"	Rodney Clawson; Vicky McGehee; John Rich	3:34
2.	"She's Country"	Danny Myrick; Bridgette Tatum	3:41
3.	"Big Green Tractor"	Jim Collins; David Lee Murphy	3:25
4.	"The Truth"	Brett James; Ashley Monroe	3:59
5.	"My Kinda Party"	Brantley Gilbert	4:45
6.	"Don't You Wanna Stay" (with Kelly Clarkson)	Andy Gibson; Paul Jenkins; Jason Sellers	4:17
7.	"Dirt Road Anthem"	Colt Ford; Gilbert	3:50
8.	"Tattoos on This Town"	Michael Dulaney; Wendell Mobley; Neil Thrasher	3:23
9.	"Fly Over States"	Dulaney; Thrasher	3:39
10.	"Take a Little Ride"	Dylan Altman; Jim McCormick; Clawson	3:08
11.	"The Only Way I Know" (with Luke Bryan and Eric Church)	Ben Hayslip; Murphy	3:14
12.	"Night Train"	Dulaney; Thrasher	3:53
13.	"When She Says Baby"	Rhett Akins; Hayslip	2:52
14.	"Burnin' It Down"	Clawson; Tyler Hubbard; Brian Kelley; Chris Tompkins	3:40
15.	"Just Gettin' Started"	Akins; Chris DeStefano; Ashley Gorley	3:16
16.	"Tonight Looks Good on You"	Akins; Dallas Davidson; Gorley	3:52
17.	"Lights Come On"	Hubbard; Kelley; Jimmy Robbins; Jordan Schmidt; Brad Warren; Brett Warren	3:15
18.	"A Little More Summertime"	Jerry Flowers; Tony Martin; Wendell Mobley	3:40
19.	"Any Ol' Barstool"	Deric Ruttan; Josh Thompson	3:24
20.	"You Make It Easy"	Hubbard; Kelley; Schmidt; Morgan Wallen	3:14
21.	"Drowns the Whiskey" (featuring Miranda Lambert)	Brandon Kinney; Jeff Middleton; Thompson	3:23
22.	"Girl Like You"	Jaron Boyer; Josh Mirenda; Michael Tyler	3:15
23.	"Rearview Town"	Kelley Lovelace; Bobby Pinson; Thrasher	3:05
24.	"Got What I Got"	Thomas Archer; Alex Palmer; Tyler	2:59
25.	"Blame It on You"	Kurt Allison; John Edwards; Tully Kennedy; Tyler; Brian Gene White	3:36
26.	"If I Didn't Love You" (with Carrie Underwood)	Allison; Bernardis Hughes; Tully Kennedy; John Morgan	3:33
27.	"Trouble with a Heartbreak"	Allison; Brett Beavers; Kennedy; Morgan	3:17
28.	"Try That in a Small Town"	Allison; Kennedy; Lovelace; Thrasher	3:02
29.	"Friends Like That" (John Morgan featuring Jason Aldean)	Brent Anderson; Will Bundy; Morgan; Lydia Vaughan	3:07
30.	"Whiskey Drink"	Allison; Edwards; Kennedy; Morgan	3:11
Total length:			103:57

== Charts ==
Weekly chart performance for 30 Number One Hits
Chart (2025–2026)	Peak position
Canadian Albums (Billboard)	55
US Billboard 200	19
US Independent Albums (Billboard)	2
US Top Country Albums (Billboard)	4
