= Try That in a Small Town =

2023 single by Jason Aldean

Single by Jason Aldean

from the album Highway Desperado
- Released: May 22, 2023
- Genre: Country
- Length: 3:01
- Label: BBR
- Songwriters: Kelley Lovelace; Neil Thrasher; Tully Kennedy; Kurt Allison
- Producer: Michael Knox

Jason Aldean singles chronology
| "That's What Tequila Does" (2022) | "Try That in a Small Town" (2023) | "Let Your Boys Be Country" (2023) |

Music video
- "Try That in a Small Town" on YouTube

"Try That in a Small Town" is a song written by Kelley Lovelace, Neil Thrasher, Tully Kennedy, and Kurt Allison, and recorded by American country music singer Jason Aldean. It was released to country radio in May 2023 as the lead single to Aldean's eleventh studio album Highway Desperado, released in November 2023.

The song was the subject of widespread controversy and media attention following the release of its music video in July 2023, with accusations that the song was a coded endorsement of lynching, which both Aldean and the video's producers have denied. Four days after the video's release, the television network CMT withdrew it from its rotation. After the subsequent extensive media coverage, "Try That in a Small Town" had a surge in popularity.

The track reached number one on the US Billboard Hot 100, Aldean's first on that chart to date, and in late July experienced the biggest sales week for a country song in over 10 years. It also reached number nine in Canada and number five in the Philippines.

== Content ==
"Try That in a Small Town" contrasts rural and urban lifestyles. It asserts that behavior such as flag burning, carjacking, or protests and attacks toward police officers will face stronger consequences in a rural setting than an urban one, stating, "try that in a small town, see how far ya make it down the road" and "if you're looking for a fight, try that in a small town". In the second verse, Aldean sings about gun rights and not wanting his own to be confiscated.

The song is composed in the key of C minor with a 4/4 time signature and approximate tempo of 72 beats per minute. It mainly follows the chord progression Cm-A♭-B♭.

== Music video ==
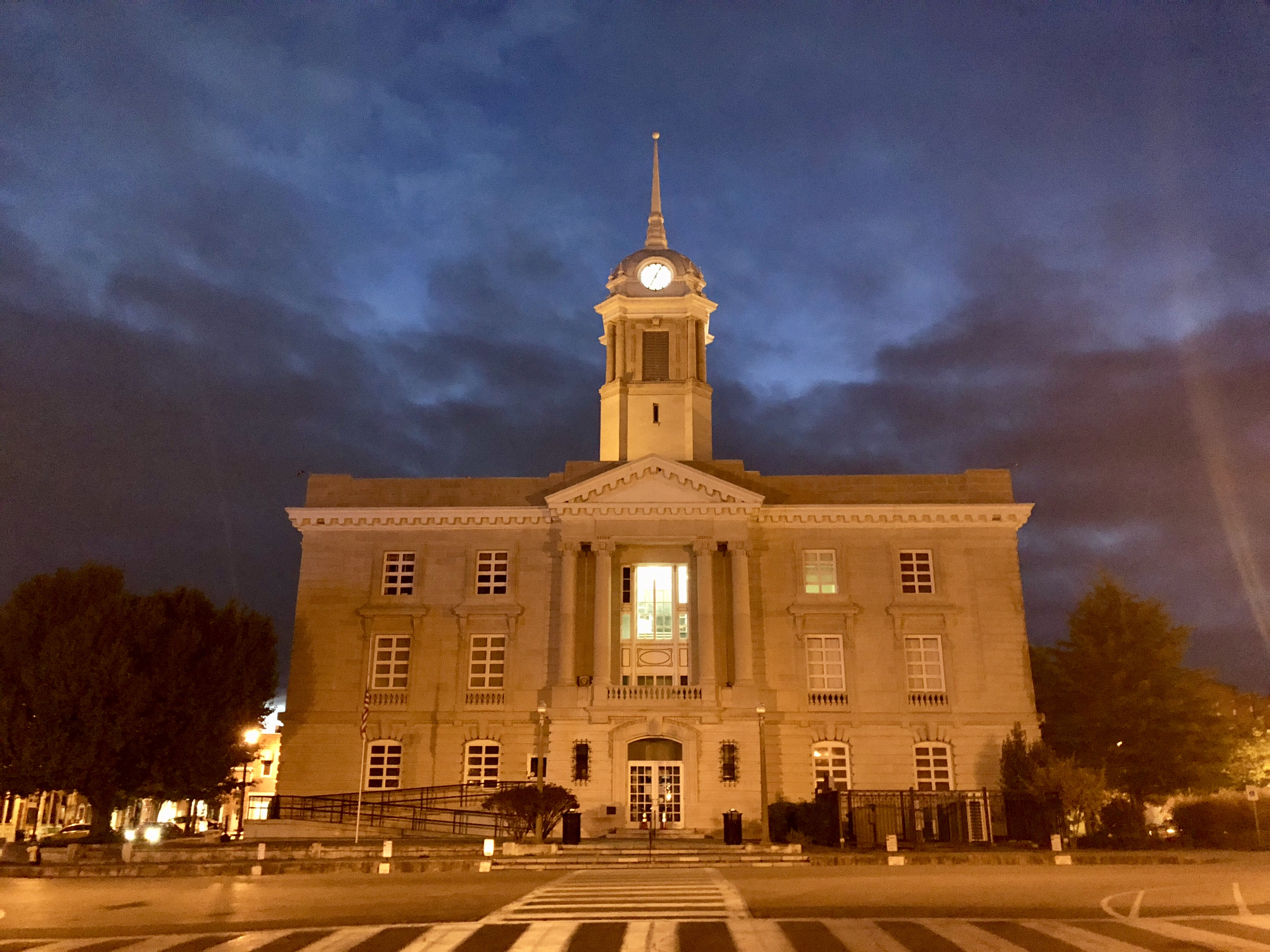
The Maury County Courthouse in Columbia, Tennessee (pictured in 2022), where the video was shot. The use of this location caused some controversy, with some critics and listeners citing it as the same location as the 1927 lynching of Henry Choate, and thus accusing Aldean of releasing a pro-lynching song, an accusation which he later denied.

On July 14, 2023, Aldean released the song's music video, directed by Shaun Silva. The video features Aldean performing in front of the courthouse at Columbia, Tennessee—where the lynching of Henry Choate had occurred in 1927—interspersed with news footage of rallies, looting, and riots directed at police officers. It has scenes of Americana, such as a young girl playing hopscotch and a group of farmers helping each other.

Four days after the video's release, the television network CMT withdrew it. In response to Aldean's statements that "there isn't a single video clip that isn't real news footage," social media users and media outlets reported that the video includes multiple clips filmed outside the United States, including commercial stock footage. Rolling Stone reported that the music video contains footage from protests in Toronto and Montreal. On July 26, a six-second clip of Fox News's coverage of a Black Lives Matter protest in Atlanta, Georgia, was removed from the original music video due to third-party copyright clearance issues, with the edited video having a length of three minutes and two seconds.

== Critical reception ==
Alexandra Willingham of CNN wrote that "on the surface, it has the makings of a common country hit, with themes of small towns, guns, and rugged self-sufficience". Writing for MusicRow, Robert K. Oermann described the song as "Tuneless, bellicose bellowing about how evil big cities are". In a review of Highway Desperado for Allmusic, Stephen Thomas Erlewine stated "All its success was based on how the single and video deliberately pushed cultural buttons; strip those away, and 'Try That in a Small Town' is just another in a long line of crawling, glowering, arena-country from Aldean."

In July 2023, the song and its music video were criticized by artists, politicians, and consumers who considered the lyrics and video to be an endorsement of racism and politically motivated violence. Chris Willman of Variety called it "the most contemptible country song of the decade [and] the video is worse", saying that the song "is close to being the most cynical song ever written about the implicit moral superiority of having a limited number of neighbors" and is "a list of hellishly dystopian tropes about city evils that seems half-borrowed from Hank Williams Jr.'s 'A Country Boy Can Survive', half-borrowed from the Book of Revelation". He said that the video "conflates the act of protesting with violent crime". Marcus K. Dowling of The Tennessean wrote that "online critics highlighted the following song lyrics as emblematic of songs heightening pro-gun violence and lynching sentiments upon many in his rural, small-town fanbase". Of the video, Dowling noted that the courthouse was the site of the lynching of Henry Choate in 1927 and the Columbia race riot of 1946. The video's producers stated that Aldean did not choose the location and was unaware of its history, and that it is a popular filming location outside of Nashville, where several films and music videos have been filmed, including Runaway June's "We Were Rich" and Hannah Montana: The Movie.

Cheryl L. Keyes, chair of the department of African American studies at UCLA said, "I think there is a lack of sensitivity using that courthouse as a prop". Columbia Mayor Chaz Molder said that he respected Aldean's "freedom of his own lyrics", but hoped the next video filmed in Columbia would "seek a more positive message". Tennessee state representative Justin Jones tweeted "As Tennessee lawmakers, we have an obligation to condemn Jason Aldean's heinous song calling for racist violence ... What a shameful vision of gun extremism and vigilantism." He explicitly referred to the song as a "heinous vile racist song" which attempts to normalize "racist, violence, vigilantism and white nationalism" in a later interview on CNN. Arwa Mahdawi from The Guardian said the dog whistling racism in the song was "difficult to ignore", and opined the small town Aldean sings about is "a product of his imagination", noting he grew up in Macon, Georgia, with a population of over 150,000, then moved to Nashville.

CNN and Newsweek reported that many listeners found the lyrics to be hypocritical in promoting guns, as Aldean had previously called guns "too easy to get" after having fled the stage during the 2017 Las Vegas shooting. Others thought the lyrics were supportive of lynchings and sundown towns. Sharon Knolle of TheWrap likewise noted such comparisons among users of social media.

Amanda Marie Martinez of NPR considered it an example of country music songs which denigrate urban lifestyles while praising rural ones: "Cities are painted as spaces where crime, sexual promiscuity, and personal and financial ruin occur, while the 'country' is meanwhile framed as a peaceful space where happiness reigns." She wrote that the song "builds on a lineage of anti-city songs in country music that place the rural and urban along not only a moral versus immoral binary, but an implicitly racialized one as well...selective availability of home loans in suburbs and racially restrictive housing covenants in cities furthered white flight, making cities synonymous with non-whiteness." She concluded by stating that such songs are "why country music continues to be a frightening space for marginalized communities".

Kevin M. Kruse, professor of history at Princeton University specializing in 20th-century America, called out the song for "calling for people who aren't law enforcement to mete out violence against people who haven't broken any laws," a callout to "law and order" that is "actually lawlessnness."

The music video garnered over 17 million views on YouTube in the first ten days of its release on July 14. Republican presidential candidates Vivek Ramaswamy and Nikki Haley began playing the song at their campaign events, with Ramaswamy saying he wanted to help get it to number one on the Billboard Hot 100.

=== Response from Aldean and other artists ===
Other musicians have responded to the song. Sheryl Crow criticized both the song and Aldean on Twitter, claiming that "even people in small towns are sick of violence", accused Aldean of "promoting violence", and stated that the song "is not American or small town-like. It's just lame." Adeem the Artist recorded and posted on Twitter a parody titled "Sundown Town", satirizing the song's viewpoints: "we root for the cops to stop people like you". Jason Isbell dared Aldean to author his own next song instead of licensing from a third party.

Travis Tritt wrote in support of Aldean that "[In my opinion], this song isn't promoting violence as some have suggested", and that it represents the viewpoint of many Americans who are opposed to the escalating violence of certain activist groups. In more support for Aldean, singer Parker McCollum retweeted a post, originally by political commentator Matt Walsh, highlighting a perceived double-standard of those who say the song "promotes violence" while "nearly every rap song for the past 30 years has directly and enthusiastically glorified murder, drug dealing, robbery and every other violent crime, and these people say nothing". Singer-songwriter Brantley Gilbert, who co-wrote Aldean's hits "Dirt Road Anthem" and "My Kinda Party", voiced his support for Aldean and the song during several live shows, stating that many who opposed the song were "a bunch of keyboard warriors hiding behind a cell phone and laptops talking a bunch of shit".

Responding to criticism, Aldean tweeted that the song "refers to the feeling of a community that I had growing up, where we took care of our neighbors, regardless of differences of background or belief. Because they were our neighbors, and that was above any differences." He said, "There is not a single lyric in the song that references race or points to it—and there isn't a single video clip that isn't real news footage—and while I can try and respect others to have their own interpretation of a song with music—this one goes too far." On the Big D and Bubba radio show in October 2023, Aldean said the Courthouse location for the video shoot was chosen for "convenience", saying, "it's 5 minutes from [his] house". Aldean told CBS News that he was unaware that a lynching had taken place there: "...I also don't go back a hundred years and check on the history of a place before we go shoot it either...It's also the place that I go get my car tags every year." He also said that in the South, it would be hard to find a small-town courthouse "that hasn't had some sort of racial issue over the years at some point." Nevertheless, Aldean said that based on his later knowledge, he probably would not have done the video shoot in that location.

After the attempted assassination of Donald Trump in July 2024, Aldean dedicated the song during a concert in Nashville to Trump, saying, "President Trump’s a friend of mine so I want to send this next song out to him. We all know what’s going to happen come November, so it’s all good. Just goes to show you there’s a lot of bullshit in the world, and that’s kind of what this song right here was about, so this one goes out to the pres."

== Commercial performance ==
"Try That in a Small Town" debuted at number 24 on the Billboard Country Airplay chart dated June 3, 2023. On the Hot Country Songs chart dated June 3, 2023, it debuted at number 35. After its video was released on July 14 and the attention drawn to it when it was pulled from CMT, it debuted at number two on the Billboard Hot 100 chart dated July 29, before reaching number one the following week, making it Aldean's first song to top that chart.

The week that it reached number one, Morgan Wallen's "Last Night" and Luke Combs's "Fast Car" sat at the number two and three positions, respectively, making it the first time in that chart's history that the top three positions were occupied by country artists. The following week, "Try That in a Small Town" fell twenty spots to No. 21, making it the sixth song to fall out of the top 20 from number one. It also peaked at number one on the Billboard Hot Country Songs chart, becoming Aldean's first number one on that chart since "Burnin' It Down" in 2014. It also peaked at number two on the Billboard Country Airplay chart for four weeks, being blocked from number one by both Lainey Wilson's "Watermelon Moonshine" and Morgan Wallen's "Thinkin' Bout Me".

"Try That in a Small Town" stayed at number one on Billboard's Digital Songs chart for four weeks, and the Country Songs chart for two weeks.

== Credits and personnel ==
- Jason Aldean – vocals
- Kurt Allison – electric guitar, keyboards, songwriting
- Adam Ayan – mastering
- Blake Bollinger – programming
- Jeff Braun – mixing
- Peter Coleman – engineering
- Brandon Epps – engineering, digital editing
- Tony Harrell – Hammond B3 organ
- Mike Johnson – pedal steel guitar
- Tully Kennedy – bass guitar, programming, songwriting
- Michael Knox – production, programming
- Kelley Lovelace – songwriting
- Danny Rader – acoustic guitar
- Rich Redmond – drums
- Adam Shoenfeld – electric guitar
- Neil Thrasher – background vocals, songwriting

== Charts ==
=== Weekly charts ===
Weekly chart performance for "Try That in a Small Town"
| Chart (2023–2024) | Peak position |
|---|---|
| Canada Hot 100 (Billboard) | 9 |
| Canada Country (Billboard) | 49 |
| Global 200 (Billboard) | 2 |
| New Zealand Hot Singles (RMNZ) | 26 |
| Netherlands Global (Dutch Top 40) | 28 |
| UK Singles Sales (OCC) | 9 |
| US Billboard Hot 100 | 1 |
| US Country Airplay (Billboard) | 2 |
| US Hot Country Songs (Billboard) | 1 |

=== Year-end charts ===
2023 year-end chart performance for "Try That in a Small Town"
| Chart (2023) | Position |
|---|---|
| US Billboard Hot 100 | 66 |
| US Country Airplay (Billboard) | 37 |
| US Hot Country Songs (Billboard) | 19 |

2024 year-end chart performance for "Try That in a Small Town"
| Chart (2024) | Position |
|---|---|
| US Hot Country Songs (Billboard) | 74 |

== See also ==
- "Rich Men North of Richmond", a 2023 song by Oliver Anthony that attracted similar controversy
