= Friends Like That =

Single by John Morgan featuring Jason Aldean

from the album Carolina Blue
- Released: April 22, 2024
- Recorded: Sound Emporium (Nashville, Tennessee); Ocean Way (Nashville, Tennessee)
- Genre: Country
- Length: 3:06
- Label: BBR Music Group
- Songwriters: John Morgan; Brent Anderson; Will Bundy; Lydia Vaughan
- Producers: Jason Aldean; Kurt Allison; Tully Kennedy

John Morgan singles chronology
"Friends Like That" (2024)	"Kid Myself" (2025)

Jason Aldean singles chronology
"Let Your Boys Be Country" (2023)	"Friends Like That" (2024)	"Whiskey Drink" (2024)

"Friends Like That" is a song by American country music singer John Morgan. It was released as Morgan's debut single to country radio on April 22, 2024, and served as the lead single to his debut studio album, Carolina Blue. Originally a solo cut, it was re-recorded to feature Jason Aldean for the radio release.

== Content ==
Morgan co-wrote "Friends Like That" with Brent Anderson, Will Bundy, and Lydia Vaughan in September 2020. Topically, it is a breakup song, with the narrator nursing his heartbreak with the help of inanimate "friends" that take the form of musical records from Willie Nelson and Waylon Jennings and the alcohol brand Jack Daniel's. Morgan thought it was a different and realistic perspective to have the character stay home instead of hitting up the bar: "[it] was more real to me because when I get pissed off or whenever something happens, I just don’t want to talk to anybody".

Aldean produced the song with two of his band members, Kurt Allison and Tully Kennedy, at Sound Emporium in Nashville, Tennessee, with Bundy producing Morgan's final vocal recording at Ocean Way, also in Nashville. Morgan's original solo cut of the song was released on September 30, 2022, and later was featured on his debut EP, Remember Us, in 2023. It had amassed over 28 million streams by April 2024, making it Morgan's most-streamed song. A new version featuring Aldean singing the second verse and providing additional ad-libs and melodic tweaks was issued to country radio with an impact date of April 22, 2024, with it being the most-added song that week at the format with 64 first-week adds.

== Chart performance ==
"Friends Like That" debuted at number 60 on the Billboard Country Airplay chart dated May 4, 2024. It entered the top 10 of the chart in March 2025, giving Morgan his first and Aldean his 39th. It reached a peak of number two on the Billboard Country Airplay chart, and became Morgan's first number one hit on the Canada Country chart.

== Charts ==
=== Weekly charts ===
Weekly chart performance for "Friends Like That"
Chart (2024–2025)	Peak position
Canada Hot 100 (Billboard)	74
Canada Country (Billboard)	1
US Billboard Hot 100	57
US Country Airplay (Billboard)	2
US Hot Country Songs (Billboard)	16

=== Year-end charts ===
Year-end chart performance for "Friends Like That"
Chart (2025)	Position
US Country Airplay (Billboard)	19
US Hot Country Songs (Billboard)	66
