= Lynching of Cordie Cheek =

American lynching victim (1916–1933)

- Location: Maury County, Tennessee, U.S.
- Date: December 15, 1933; 92 years ago
- Attack type: Child murder by hanging, torture murder, lynching, shooting, dragging, kidnapping, extrajudicial killing, mutilation
- Victims: Cordie Cheek, aged 17
- Perpetrators: Mob of white residents in Maury County, Tennessee; Including: Bert Erwin (inflicted fatal injury); Cord Hayes Denton; Bob Hancock; Henry Carl Moore
- Motive: Anti-black racism; Vigilantism against Cheek after being exonerated of the attempted rape of a white girl
- Charges: None

James Cordie Cheek (1916 – December 15, 1933) was a 17-year-old African-American youth who was lynched by a white mob in Maury County, Tennessee near the county seat of Columbia. After being falsely accused of attempting to rape a young white girl, Cheek was released from jail when the grand jury did not indict him, due to lack of evidence. The county magistrate and two other men from Maury County abducted Cheek from Nashville, where he was staying with relatives near Fisk University, took him back to the county, and turned him over to a lynch mob. The mob mutilated Cheek and murdered him by hanging. A grand jury declined to indict anyone for the murder of Cheek.

== Lynching ==
Cordie Cheek lived with his parents in Glendale, a small community just south of the county seat of Columbia in Maury County. Cordie's mother Tenny "worked for many years as a cook, maid, midwife, and nurse" for the Moores, a white family who lived nearby. Tenny arranged for her son to help doing chores around the Moore household. Henry Carl Moore, nineteen years old in the winter of 1933, was two years older than Cordie. Friction began to develop between the two young men and, on one occasion, they had come to blows after a dispute over payment due to Cordie and his mother.

On November 16, 1933, Cheek was chopping wood for the Moores. As he brought a load into the house, he accidentally collided with Henry's twelve-year-old sister, tearing her dress. Incensed, Henry paid his younger sister one dollar to claim that Cordie had tried to rape her.

Following the allegations, Cheek was arrested and placed in jail first in nearby Pulaski and eventually in Nashville, where he was taken out of concern for his safety. A Maury County grand jury eventually declined to indict him on the charge of attempted rape, or for any other lesser crime, due to lack of evidence, and he was released. Once freed, Cheek went to stay in the home of his uncle and aunt, who lived at the edge of the campus of Fisk University in Nashville. A mob formed in Maury County, traveled to Nashville, and abducted Cheek, taking him back to Maury County. Among them were C. Hayes Denton, county magistrate, whose car transported Cheek; Bert Erwin, and Bob Hancock.

After they returned to Maury County, a white lynch mob formed. The white community was told of the impending lynching and assembled to watch. Cheek was forced to climb a ladder; white men put a blindfold over his face and a rope around his neck, strung from a cedar tree. The men exposed his genitals and castrated him. One man, allegedly Bert Erwin, used a pole to push the ladder away from Cordie's feet, causing him to be hanged to death. The onlookers, including women and children, cheered and passed around pistols, firing them into the air in celebration.

Following the lynching, prosecutors intended to indict six suspects for the murder of Cheek, but a grand jury declined to file charges.

== Aftermath ==
The lynching of Cordie Cheek reverberated across the South. Students and administrators at Fisk University were angered and alarmed, not only for the event but because he had been abducted nearby.

Noted historian John Hope Franklin, then a student at Fisk, recalled:

Those of us who had remained in Nashville over the Christmas holidays were obsessed with discussing the Cordie Cheek lynching. Indeed, the entire remainder of our junior year was shadowed by this tragic event. There were investigations, interviews, and other actions. The conclusion that many of us reached was that if it could happen to Cordie Cheek, who had been seized within three blocks of the Fisk Chapel, it could happen to any of us.

In his 1934 essay, "Cowards from the Colleges," Langston Hughes commented that Cheek "was abducted almost at the gates of the University."

In spite of various protests and calls in Nashville for justice, Gail Williams O'Brien writes that, "Maury County officials, along with a number of leading citizens in the community, closed ranks to block indictments against the alleged lynchers, and neither state nor federal forces overcame their resistance."

In his Pulitzer Prize-winning book Devil in the Grove: Thurgood Marshall, the Groveland Boys, and the Dawn of a New America, Gilbert King theorized that the outrage from the lynching of Cheek was one of the factors that catalyzed the resistance of blacks in the Columbia, Tennessee race riot of 1946, noted nationally as the "first major racial confrontation" of the postwar era.

== Representation in other media ==
The lynching of Cordie Cheek is the subject of Sandra Seaton's play The Bridge Party, which is anthologized in Strange Fruit: Plays on Lynching by American Women. The plot of The Bridge Party connects the 1933 lynching and the 1946 race riot in Columbia. Ruby Dee appeared in a 1998 production of the play at the University of Michigan.

== See also ==
- Lynching of Henry Choate
