= Kid Myself =

Single by John Morgan

from the album Carolina Blue
- Released: June 16, 2025
- Genre: Country
- Length: 3:29
- Label: BBR Music Group
- Songwriters: John Morgan; Tyler Hubbard; Jordan Schmidt
- Producer: Brent Anderson

John Morgan singles chronology
"Friends Like That" (2024)	"Kid Myself" (2025)	"Cry Baby" (2026)

Music video
- "Kid Myself" on YouTube

"Kid Myself" is a song by American country music singer John Morgan. It was released to country radio on June 16, 2025, as the second single from his debut studio album, Carolina Blue.

== Content ==
Morgan co-wrote "Kid Myself" with Tyler Hubbard and Jordan Schmidt, and Brent Anderson produced the track. Morgan came up with the hook and presented it to Hubbard when the two first met for a writing session on June 8, 2024, before fleshing out the song at the home studio of Schmidt the following day. After hearing the vocal demo Morgan had cut, Jason Aldean told him that it should be his next single, and Morgan worked with Anderson in his home studio between tour dates to finish the song.

== Chart performance ==
"Kid Myself" debuted at number 58 on the Billboard Country Airplay chart dated July 26, 2025. It entered the top 20 of the chart in May 2026, and reached number one in October 2026.

== Charts ==
Weekly chart performance for "Kid Myself"
Chart (2025–2026)	Peak position
Canada Country (Billboard)	16
US Billboard Hot 100	57
US Country Airplay (Billboard)	1
US Hot Country Songs (Billboard)	16
