= Gonna Know We Were Here =

Single by Jason Aldean

from the album Old Boots, New Dirt
- Released: August 17, 2015
- Recorded: 2013–14
- Genre: Country
- Length: 3:44 (album version); 3:22 (radio edit)
- Label: Broken Bow
- Songwriters: Brett Beavers; Brett James
- Producer: Michael Knox

Jason Aldean singles chronology
"Tonight Looks Good on You" (2015)	"Gonna Know We Were Here" (2015)	"Lights Come On" (2016)

"Gonna Know We Were Here" is a song written by Brett Beavers and Brett James and recorded by American country music singer Jason Aldean. It was released in August 2015 as the fourth and final single from Aldean's 2014 album Old Boots, New Dirt.

== Critical reception ==
An uncredited Taste of Country review stated that "Jason Aldean is in the business of turning out radio hits, and “Gonna Know We Were Here” doesn’t disobey. The uptempo country-rocker stays true to the singer’s well-tested formula. It’s a song his fans will want to turn up loud, quickly."

== Music video ==
The music video was directed by Shaun Silva and premiered in October 2015.

== Chart performance ==
"Gonna Know We Were Here" peaked at number 2 on the Billboard Country Airplay chart and number 5 on the Billboard Hot Country Songs chart, making it Aldean's tenth single to miss the number one spot on either chart. It has sold 204,000 copies in the US as of January 2016.

Chart (2015–2016)	Peak position
Canada Hot 100 (Billboard)	52
Canada Country (Billboard)	2
US Billboard Hot 100	54
US Country Airplay (Billboard)	2
US Hot Country Songs (Billboard)	5

=== Year-end charts ===
Chart (2015)	Position
US Country Airplay (Billboard)	64
US Hot Country Songs (Billboard)	78

Chart (2016)	Position
US Country Airplay (Billboard)	49
US Hot Country Songs (Billboard)	64
