= Highway Desperado =

Studio album by Jason Aldean
- Released: November 3, 2023
- Genre: Country rock
- Length: 46:33
- Label: Broken Bow
- Producer: Michael Knox

Jason Aldean chronology
Macon, Georgia (2021/2022)	Highway Desperado (2023)	30 Number One Hits (2025)

Singles from Highway Desperado
- 1. "Try That in a Small Town" Released: May 22, 2023; 2. "Let Your Boys Be Country" Released: November 27, 2023; 3. "Whiskey Drink" Released: July 29, 2024

Highway Desperado is the eleventh studio album by American country music singer Jason Aldean, released on November 3, 2023, via Broken Bow Records. It was preceded by the lead single "Try That in a Small Town", which was released in May 2023 and has topped the Billboard Hot Country Songs chart, as well as the all-genre Billboard Hot 100, becoming Aldean's first chart-topper on the latter chart. Three other songs, "Tough Crowd", "Let Your Boys Be Country", and "Whiskey Drink" were also released ahead of the album. The latter two were released as singles from the album.

Aldean co-wrote three of the album's fourteen tracks, making it his first album since 2009's Wide Open to contain tracks that he has written or co-written.

== Track listing ==
Highway Desperado track listing
No.	Title	Writer(s)	Length
1.	"Tough Crowd"	Kurt Allison; Marv Green; Tully Kennedy; Kelley Lovelace; Neil Thrasher	3:20
2.	"Let Your Boys Be Country"	Jaron Boyer; Allison Veltz Cruz; Micah Wilshire	3:15
3.	"Knew You'd Come Around"	Kennedy; Allison; Ben Hayslip; John Morgan	3:14
4.	"Hungover In a Hotel"	Jason Aldean; Kennedy; Allison; Neil Thrasher; David Lee Murphy	3:24
5.	"Try That in a Small Town"	Allison; Kennedy; Lovelace; Thrasher	3:00
6.	"Whiskey Drink"	Allison; Jonathan Edwards; Kennedy; Morgan	3:10
7.	"Whose Rearview"	Allison; Kennedy; Morgan; Lydia Vaughn	3:16
8.	"I'm Over You"	Josh Phillips; Wilshire; Michael Tyler	3:00
9.	"Rather Watch You"	Jessi Alexander; Allison; Kennedy; Lovelace; Thrasher	3:33
10.	"Breakup Breakdown"	Aldean; Allison; Kennedy; Morgan; Vaughn	3:00
11.	"Get Away from You"	Allison; Kennedy; Morgan; Vaughn	3:20
12.	"Changing Bars"	Allison; Edwards; Kennedy; Morgan	3:25
13.	"From This Beer On"	Allison; Edwards; Kennedy; Morgan	3:07
14.	"Highway Desperado"	Aldean; Allison; Edwards; Kennedy; Morgan	4:24
Total length:			46:33

== Personnel ==
Musicians

- Jason Aldean – vocals
- Tully Kennedy – bass (all tracks), programming (tracks 1, 3–7, 9, 11–14)
- Rich Redmond – drums
- Kurt Allison – electric guitar (all tracks), programming (1, 3–7, 9, 11–14), keyboards (1, 5–7, 14), twelve-string guitar (7)
- Adam Shoenfeld – electric guitar (all tracks), slide guitar (8)
- Michael Knox – programming
- Mike Johnson – pedal steel guitar (1–10)
- Danny Rader – acoustic guitar (1, 2, 5–7, 11–13), bouzouki (2, 11–13)
- Blake Bollinger – programming (1, 3–14)
- Tony Harrell – Hammond B3 organ (1–3, 5–7, 10–13), synthesizer (4, 8, 9), piano (11), keyboards (14)
- Neil Thrasher – background vocals (1, 4, 5, 9)
- Perry Coleman – background vocals (2, 3, 6, 7, 10–14)
- Micah Wilshire – background vocals (2, 7, 8, 11–14), programming (2, 8, 10), electric guitar (2, 8); piano, synth bass (8)
- John Willis – acoustic guitar (3, 4, 8–11)
- Russ Pahl – pedal steel guitar (11–14)

Technical

- Michael Knox – production
- Adam Ayan – mastering
- Jeff Braun – mixing
- Brandon Epps – engineering, editing (all tracks); vocal engineering (3, 4)
- Peter Coleman – engineering
- Mickey Jack Cones – vocal engineering
- Micah Wilshire – vocal engineering (2–4, 6–14)

== Charts ==
=== Weekly charts ===
Weekly chart performance for Highway Desperado
Chart (2023)	Peak position
Australian Country Albums (ARIA)	14
Canadian Albums (Billboard)	44
UK Album Downloads (OCC)	34
UK Country Albums (OCC)	5
UK Independent Albums (OCC)	32
US Billboard 200	19
US Independent Albums (Billboard)	4
US Top Country Albums (Billboard)	6

=== Year-end charts ===
Year-end chart performance for Highway Desperado
Chart (2024)	Position
US Top Country Albums (Billboard)	61
