= They Don't Know (Jason Aldean album) =

Studio album by Jason Aldean
- Released: September 9, 2016
- Recorded: 2015–16
- Studios: Stage Write Studios, Westwood Studios, Blackbird Studio and Starstruck Studios (Nashville, Tennessee); Hound's Ear Studio (Franklin, Tennessee)
- Genres: Country; country rock
- Length: 49:04
- Labels: Broken Bow; Macon Music
- Producer: Michael Knox

Jason Aldean chronology
Old Boots, New Dirt (2014)	They Don't Know (2016)	Rearview Town (2018)

Singles from They Don't Know
- 1. "Lights Come On" Released: April 1, 2016; 2. "A Little More Summertime" Released: July 15, 2016; 3. "Any Ol' Barstool" Released: December 5, 2016; 4. "They Don't Know" Released: May 8, 2017

Professional ratings
Review scores
Source	Rating
AllMusic	2.5/5 stars
Rolling Stone	2/5 stars

They Don't Know is the seventh studio album by American country music artist Jason Aldean. It was released on September 9, 2016, via Broken Bow Records. Its lead single, "Lights Come On", was released on April 1, 2016, and has reached number one on the Country Airplay chart. The album's second single, "A Little More Summertime", was released on July 15, 2016. The album's third single, "Any Ol' Barstool", was released on December 5, 2016. The album's fourth and final single, the title track, was sent to country radio on May 8, 2017.

== Commercial performance ==
They Don't Know debuted at number one on the Billboard 200, becoming Aldean's third album to top the chart. It earned 138,000 album-equivalent units, of which 131,000 were album sales. The album has sold 430,500 copies in the United States as of February 2018.

== Track listing ==
No.	Title	Writer(s)	Length
1.	"Lights Come On"	Brian Kelley; Tyler Hubbard; Jordan Schmidt; Jimmy Robbins; Brad Warren; Brett Warren	3:14
2.	"A Little More Summertime"	Jerry Flowers; Tony Martin; Wendell Mobley	3:39
3.	"This Plane Don't Go There"	Lee Thomas Miller; Tom Shapiro; Neil Thrasher	2:59
4.	"Comin' In Hot"	Rodney Clawson; Dallas Davidson; Ashley Gorley	2:59
5.	"First Time Again" (duet with Kelsea Ballerini)	Blake Bollinger; Jaron Boyer; Ben Stennis; Michael Tyler	3:24
6.	"Bad"	Rodney Clawson; Shane McAnally; Ashley Gorley	3:33
7.	"They Don't Know"	Kurt Allison; Boyer; Josh Mirenda	3:15
8.	"One We Won't Forget"	Dylan Altman; Clawson; Ben Hayslip	3:17
9.	"Whiskey'd Up"	Rhett Akins; Michael Carter; Shane Minor	3:11
10.	"In Case You Don't Remember"	Jonathan Edwards; Tully Kennedy; Steve Pasch; Brian Gene White	3:00
11.	"All Out of Beer"	Jeremy Bussey; Travis Denning; Jordan Rager	3:18
12.	"Any Ol' Barstool"	Deric Ruttan; Josh Thompson	3:23
13.	"The Way a Night Should Feel"	Brett James; Nick Brophy	3:04
14.	"Reason to Love L.A."	Allison; Michael Dulaney; Kennedy; Jason Sever	3:22
15.	"When the Lights Go Out"	Boyer; Jim McCormick; Mirenda	3:26

== Personnel ==
Musicians

- Jason Aldean – vocals
- Tony Harrell – acoustic piano, synthesizers, Hammond B3 organ
- Kurt Allison – electric guitar
- Rob McNelley – electric guitar
- Danny Rader – acoustic guitar, hi-string guitar, bouzouki, tres
- Adam Shoenfeld – electric guitar
- John Willis – acoustic guitar, hi-string guitar
- Mike Johnson – steel guitar
- Russ Pahl – steel guitar
- Tully Kennedy – bass
- Rich Redmond – drums, percussion
- Blake Bollinger – drum programming
- Jaron Boyer – drum programming
- Jonathan Yudkin – cello
- Perry Coleman – backing vocals
- Russell Terrell – backing vocals
- Neil Thrasher – backing vocals
- Kelsea Ballerini – vocals on "First Time Again"

Production and Technical

- Michael Knox – producer
- Peter Coleman – recording
- Mickey Jack Cones – vocal recording
- Jay DeMarcus – vocal recording for Kelsea Ballerini
- Justin Niebank – mixing
- Drew Bollman – assistant engineer
- Sam Martin – assistant engineer
- Brady Tillow – assistant engineer
- Brandon Epps – editing engineer
- Richard Dodd – mastering at Richard Dodd Mixing and Mastering (Nashville, Tennessee)
- Shalacy Griffin – production coordinator
- Maverick – management
- Jayme Calhoun – label copy, licensing

Visuals

- Douglas Gledhill – design
- Madalyn Hankins – art direction
- Jim Wright – photography
- John Murphy – wardrobe stylist
- Brittany Williams Aldean – hair, make-up

== Chart positions ==
=== Weekly charts ===
Chart (2016)	Peak position
Australian Albums (ARIA)	5
Canadian Albums (Billboard)	2
New Zealand Heatseekers Albums (RMNZ)	4
Scottish Albums (Official Charts)	55
US Billboard 200	1
US Independent Albums (Billboard)	1
US Top Country Albums (Billboard)	1

=== Year-end charts ===
Chart (2016)	Position
Australian Country Albums (ARIA)	15
US Billboard 200	114
US Top Country Albums (Billboard)	12
US Independent Albums (Billboard)	5
Chart (2017)	Position
US Billboard 200	84
US Top Country Albums (Billboard)	11
Chart (2018)	Position
US Top Country Albums (Billboard)	93

=== Singles ===
Year	Single	Peak chart positions				
Year	Single	US Country	US Country Airplay	US	CAN Country	CAN
2016	"Lights Come On"	3	1	43	3	81
2016	"A Little More Summertime"	5	1	57	2	—
2016	"Any Ol' Barstool"	5	1	52	1	100
2017	"They Don't Know"	8	3	67	2	—

== Certifications ==
Region	Certification	Certified units/sales
Canada (Music Canada)	Gold	40,000^{‡}
United States (RIAA)	Gold	500,000^{‡}
^{‡} Sales+streaming figures based on certification alone.
