= Lynching of Henry Choate =

1927 lynching of a Black man in Tennessee

Coordinates: 35°36′54″N 87°2′40″W

- Location: Columbia, Tennessee, U.S.
- Date: November 13, 1927; 98 years ago
- Attack type: Murder by bludgeoning, lynching, extrajudicial killing, hanging, dragging
- Weapons: Rope, sledgehammer, motor vehicle
- Victims: Henry Choate, aged 18
- Perpetrators: Mob of white residents in Columbia, Tennessee
- Motive: Anti-black racism, retaliation against Choate for being accused of the assault of a white girl
- Charges: None

Henry Choate was an 18-year-old African-American teenager who was lynched by a mob in Columbia, Tennessee, on November 13, 1927. Choate was accused of having assaulted 16-year old Sarah Harlan, a white girl, and was taken to the Columbia jail, despite Harlan not being able to identify Choate as the attacker. A mob numbering hundreds of people sprang him from the jail, dragged him through the city behind a car, and then hanged him from the courthouse. During the lynching, Harlan's mother begged the mob to spare Choate's life. A grand jury declined to file any charges.

== Lynching ==
Choate was working on a road construction project in Coffee County, Tennessee, and went to Columbia on Armistice Day to visit his grandfather, Henry Clay Harlan, who was 85 years old, born into slavery, and lived about seven miles west of Columbia. During that visit, a young white girl, 16-year old Sarah Harlan (no relation to Henry Clay Harlan) claimed she had been attacked by a young black man. The sheriff of Maury County, Sam Wiley, brought in a pack of bloodhounds. Choate was arrested and put in the county jail, despite Sarah Harlan saying she could not identify Choate as the perpetrator. The sheriff's wife, Mrs. Wiley, alerted the "Negro cook of the jail", Ella Gant, that a group of men were going to come and kill Choate. Gant brought him cigarettes and told him the news, and that he should pray. When the mob came, Mrs. Wiley hid the keys and told the mob she wasn't going to see "an innocent boy hung". But when a man started pounding at the jail door with a hammer, and the use of dynamite was threatened, she procured the key. The mob, some 250 men, opened the jail, got Choate out, and someone hit him with a hammer on the head, murdering him. They then tied him to a truck and dragged him through the streets, and up into the courthouse. There he was hanged, from the second story of the County Courthouse in Columbia, which was still decorated for Armistice Day. During the lynching, Sarah Harlan's mother begged the mob to let Choate live and instead let the case go to trial.

Two weeks after the lynching, a grand jury declined to file charges. While acknowledging that the lynching was a criminal offense, the grand jury stated in their ruling that witnesses were unable to positively identify any perpetrators.

== Renewed attention ==
In 2023, Choate's lynching became the subject of renewed media coverage due to the use of the Maury County Courthouse as the main filming site for Jason Aldean's "Try That In A Small Town" music video. The song's lyrics, and the choice of filming location for the video, were characterized as racist by many critics, with the video being pulled by Country Music Television. The song subsequently topped the US Billboard Hot 100.

== See also ==
- Lynching of Cordie Cheek
