= They Don't Know (Jason Aldean song) =

Single by Jason Aldean

from the album They Don't Know
- Released: May 8, 2017
- Genre: Country; country rock
- Length: 3:15
- Label: Broken Bow
- Songwriters: Kurt Allison; Jaron Boyer; Josh Mirenda
- Producer: Michael Knox

Jason Aldean singles chronology
"Any Ol' Barstool" (2016)	"They Don't Know" (2017)	"You Make It Easy" (2018)

"They Don't Know" is a song written by Kurt Allison, Jaron Boyer, and Josh Mirenda and recorded by American country music artist Jason Aldean. It was released in May 2017 as the fourth and final single — and title track — from Aldean's 2016 album of the same name. The song was a Top 10 hit on both the US Billboard Country Airplay and Hot Country Songs charts with peaks at numbers 3 and 8 respectively.

== Music video ==
The music video was directed by Stephen Shepherd and premiered on CMT, GAC and Vevo in May 2017.

== Charts ==
Chart (2017)	Peak position
Canada Country (Billboard)	2
US Billboard Hot 100	67
US Country Airplay (Billboard)	3
US Hot Country Songs (Billboard)	8

=== Year-end charts ===
Chart (2017)	Position
Canada Country (Billboard)	32
US Country Airplay (Billboard)	28
US Hot Country Songs (Billboard)	40
