= Columbia race riot of 1946 =

Race riot in Tennessee that erupted over a dispute over a radio

On the night of February 26–27, 1946, a disturbance known as the Columbia Race Riot took place in Columbia, the county seat of Maury County, Tennessee. The national press, which covered it extensively, called it the first "major racial confrontation" after the Second World War. It marked a new spirit of resistance by African-American veterans and others following their participation in World War II, which they believed had earned them their full rights as citizens, despite Jim Crow laws. Race relations in the county were tense, and several lynchings had taken place in the recent past.

James Stephenson, an African-American Navy veteran, went with his mother, 37-year-old Gladys Stephenson, to Castner-Knott department store, where she learned that a radio she had left for repair had been sold. When she complained, the white repair apprentice, Billy Fleming, struck her. Stephenson had been a welterweight on the Navy boxing team and retaliated by hitting Fleming, who crashed through a window. Fleming had withstood a cut to his leg and needed medical attention. Both Stephenson and his mother were arrested, charged with disturbing the peace, pled guilty, and paid $50 fines. However, Fleming's father convinced the sheriff to charge them with attempted murder. When whites learned that Fleming had gone to a hospital for treatment, a mob gathered. A risk arose that the Stephenson's would be lynched. White mobs raided and broke into black homes following the dispute escalating tensions further Due to the violence of the white mobs African Americans began to take up arms to protect themselves. The escalating continued with white men trying to reach the Stephenson's.

Julius Blair, a 76-year-old black store owner, arranged to have the Stephenson's released to his custody. He drove them out of town for their protection. When the mob did not disperse, about 100 African-American men began to patrol their neighborhood, located south of the courthouse square, determined to resist. Four police officers were shot and wounded, officer Wilsford more severely with a shot to the face neck and chest, when they entered "Mink Slide", the name given to the African-American business district, also known as "The Bottom". Following the attack on the police, the city government requested state troopers, who were sent and soon outnumbered the black patrollers. The state troopers began ransacking black businesses, stealing goods and cash, and rounding up African Americans. They cut phone service to Mink Slide, but the owners of a funeral home, James and Mary Morton, who had tried to help hide African Americans avoid arrest, managed to call Nashville and ask for help from the NAACP.

The Maury County jail was soon overcrowded with black "suspects" after having arrested over 100 African Americans. Police questioned them for days without counsel. About 25 black men were eventually charged with rioting and attempted murder. Three men of which were targeted by the police, James Johnson, William Gordon, and Napoleon Stewart. Two of these men were killed and one wounded, allegedly while "trying to escape" during a transfer. During the interrogation of James Johnson and William Gordon the guns which were confiscated during the arrests were visible. Gordon took gun from the stack and aimed it at 70-year-old Deputy T. R. Darnell. Johnson involvement in this interaction is unknown but both he and Gordon were fired at by Highway Patrol Billy Griffin and others and were subsequently killed.

After the NAACP was made aware of the condition in Columbia many members of the NAACP became involved. A few of these men included Z. Alexander Looby, Donald Jones, Maurice Weaver. sent Thurgood Marshall as the lead attorney to defend Stephenson and the other defendants. Thurgood Marshall was accompanied by Walter White, the executive secretary of the NAACP. Thurgood Marshall gained a change of venue, but only to another small town of Lawrenceburg, Tennessee, where trials took place throughout the summer of 1946. Marshall was assisted by two local attorneys, Zephaniah Alexander Looby, originally from the British West Indies, and Maurice Weaver, a white activist from Nashville. Marshall was also preparing litigation for education and voting-rights cases.

Marshall obtained acquittals for 23 of the black defendants, even with an all-white jury. The remaining two were found guilty but the charges were later dropped. Marshall and two Tennessee attorneys required an escort to leave the county safely. At the last murder trials in November 1946, Marshall also won acquittal for Rooster Bill Pillow, and a reduction in the sentence of Papa Kennedy, allowing him to go free on bail.

According to historian Dorothy Beeler, "the Columbia incident and the reaction to it were major events of the late 1940's, which helped create a base from which black organizations gathered strength for the civil rights push of the 1950's and 1960's.”
