= Lights Come On =

Single by Jason Aldean

from the album They Don't Know
- Released: April 1, 2016
- Recorded: 2015–16
- Genre: Country rock
- Length: 3:14
- Label: Broken Bow
- Songwriters: Brian Kelley; Tyler Hubbard; Jordan Schmidt; Jimmy Robbins; Brad Warren; Brett Warren
- Producer: Michael Knox

Jason Aldean singles chronology
"Gonna Know We Were Here" (2015)	"Lights Come On" (2016)	"A Little More Summertime" (2016)

"Lights Come On" is a song written by Jimmy Robbins, Jordan Schmidt, Brad Warren, Brett Warren, and then-Florida Georgia Line members Tyler Hubbard and Brian Kelley and recorded by American country music artist Jason Aldean. It was released on April 1, 2016, as the lead single from Aldean's 2016 album They Don't Know.

== Critical reception ==
The single has mostly received negative reviews from critics. Kevin John Coyne of Country Universe was critical of the concert-orientated theme of the song, writing that "“Lights Come On” seems written for the sole purpose of kicking off a Jason Aldean concert. It's all very meta, and easy to picture the audience saying, “Hey! He’s singing about us! Cool!”" and "But that’s every Jason Aldean song these days, isn’t it? Soulless, monotonous, assembly line records that are interchangeable with one another and forgotten as soon as the song ends." He rated the song a D grade.

An uncredited Taste of Country review was more favorable, praising the country rock instrumentation and compared the song favorably to that of Aldean's earlier hits "My Kinda Party" and "She's Country."

== Commercial reception ==
The song debuted at No. 29 on the Country Airplay chart, his third highest debut on the chart. The airplay also placed the song at No. 43 on the Hot Country Songs. The following week when the song was released for sale, Jason Aldean performed the song at the 2016 ACM Awards where he won Entertainer of the Year. The song sold 70,000 copies in its first sales week, which made it the No. 1 on the Country Digital Songs chart, and its sales pushed it up to No. 7 on Hot Country Songs. The song has sold 408,000 copies in the US as of September 2016.

== Music video ==
The music video was directed by Shaun Silva and premiered in June 2016. It is 5 minutes long, and combines tour footage of Aldean's 2016 Six String Circus Tour, with an in-depth interview with Aldean, in which he states what touring means to him.

== Charts ==
Chart (2016)	Peak position
Canada Hot 100 (Billboard)	81
Canada Country (Billboard)	3
US Billboard Hot 100	43
US Country Airplay (Billboard)	1
US Hot Country Songs (Billboard)	3

=== Year end charts ===
Chart (2016)	Position
US Country Airplay (Billboard)	22
US Hot Country Songs (Billboard)	13

== Certifications ==
Region	Certification	Certified units/sales
Canada (Music Canada)	Gold	40,000^{‡}
United States (RIAA)	2× Platinum	2,000,000^{‡}
^{‡} Sales+streaming figures based on certification alone.
