= A Little More Summertime =

Single by Jason Aldean

from the album They Don't Know
- Released: July 15, 2016
- Recorded: 2016
- Genre: Country
- Length: 3:39
- Label: Broken Bow
- Songwriters: Jerry Flowers; Tony Martin; Wendell Mobley
- Producer: Michael Knox

Jason Aldean singles chronology
"Lights Come On" (2016)	"A Little More Summertime" (2016)	"Any Ol' Barstool" (2016)

"A Little More Summertime" is a song written by Jerry Flowers, Tony Martin, and Wendell Mobley and recorded by American country music artist Jason Aldean. It was released on July 15, 2016 as the second single from Aldean's 2016 album, They Don't Know

== Critical reception ==
The song debuted at No. 30 on the Country Airplay chart. The following week when it was released for sale, it debuted at No. 16 in the Hot Country Songs chart, selling 35,000 copies in the United States. The song has sold 202,000 copies in the US as of November 2016.

== Music video ==
The music video was directed by Shaun Silva and premiered in September 2016. The video features Aldean's wife Brittany Kerr. It was shot in Santa Cruz, California, USA

== Charts ==
=== Weekly charts ===
Chart (2016)	Peak position
Canada Country (Billboard)	2
US Billboard Hot 100	52
US Country Airplay (Billboard)	1
US Hot Country Songs (Billboard)	5

=== Year end charts ===
Chart (2016)	Position
US Country Airplay (Billboard)	41
US Hot Country Songs (Billboard)	49
Chart (2017)	Position
US Hot Country Songs (Billboard)	85

== Certifications ==
Region	Certification	Certified units/sales
United States (RIAA)	Platinum	1,000,000^{‡}
^{‡} Sales+streaming figures based on certification alone.
