= Any Ol' Barstool =

Single by Jason Aldean

from the album They Don't Know
- Released: December 5, 2016
- Recorded: 2016
- Genre: Country
- Length: 3:23
- Label: Broken Bow
- Songwriters: Deric Ruttan; Josh Thompson
- Producer: Michael Knox

Jason Aldean singles chronology
"A Little More Summertime" (2016)	"Any Ol' Barstool" (2016)	"They Don't Know" (2017)

Music video
- "Any Ol' Barstool" on YouTube

"Any Ol' Barstool" is a song written by Deric Ruttan and Josh Thompson and recorded by American country music artist Jason Aldean. It was released on December 5, 2016, by Broken Bow Records as the third single from Aldean's seventh album They Don't Know (2016). "Any Ol' Barstool" gave Aldean his thirteenth number-one hit on the Billboard Country Airplay chart and his eleventh top 5 hit on the Hot Country Songs chart. It also reached outside the top 50 on the Hot 100 chart. The song achieved similar chart success in Canada, giving Aldean his eighth number-one hit on the Canada Country chart and reaching number 100 on the Canadian Hot 100. It was certified Gold by Music Canada for selling over 40,000 units in that country. An accompanying music video for the single, directed by Shaun Silva, features Aldean playing in an empty bar against the story of a quarreling couple.

== Background ==
"Any Ol' Barstool" was written by Deric Ruttan and Josh Thompson, and came into fruition during their first writing appointment together, where Thompson threw out the title and they completed it in quick fashion. It was originally not meant for Aldean before he heard it from producer Michael Knox, and fell in love with its "traditional country" aesthetic and called it "one of the most well-written songs" on They Don't Know.

== Critical reception ==
Billy Dukes of Taste of Country called it "a guitar-heavy rocker" that allows Aldean to deliver a "vocal showcase" throughout the runtime, concluding that: "Aldean's good at nostalgia, be it in a song about simple times that flew by too fast or more complicated affairs he wishes he could revisit. His understated performance on this song allows one to impute their own emotion into the ballad, an "Ocean Front Property" kind of story updated to fit his style. In 2017, Billboard contributor Chuck Dauphin put "Any Ol' Barstool" at number six on his top 10 list of Aldean's best songs.

== Commercial performance ==
"Any Ol' Barstool" debuted at number 93 on the Billboard Hot 100 the week of February 11, 2017. Eleven weeks later, it reached number 52 the week of April 29, and stayed on the chart for eighteen weeks. The song has sold 166,000 copies in the United States as of May 2017. In Canada, the track debuted at number 45 on the Canada Country chart the week of January 14, 2017. Twelve weeks later, it peaked on the week of April 8, and stayed on the chart for twenty weeks. It also debuted and peaked at number 100 on the Canadian Hot 100 the week of April 22. On January 11, 2018, "Any Ol' Barstool" was certified gold by Music Canada in Canada for selling over 40,000 units.

== Music video ==
A lyric video for "Any Ol' Barstool" premiered on Aldean's Vevo channel on December 5, 2016. The official music video was directed by Shaun Silva and premiered in 2017. The video tells the story of a couple fighting with each other and going about their day afterwards: the man works as a bartender mixing "business and pleasure" with both his buddies and his girlfriend's friends while she waits at home for his text messages. Intercut are scenes of Aldean performing in an empty bar.

== Charts ==
Chart (2016–2017)	Peak position
Canada Hot 100 (Billboard)	100
Canada Country (Billboard)	1
US Billboard Hot 100	52
US Country Airplay (Billboard)	1
US Hot Country Songs (Billboard)	5

=== Year-end charts ===
Chart (2017)	Position
Canada Country (Billboard)	19
US Country Airplay (Billboard)	27
US Hot Country Songs (Billboard)	20

== Certifications ==
Region	Certification	Certified units/sales
Canada (Music Canada)	Gold	40,000^{‡}
United States (RIAA)	3× Platinum	3,000,000^{‡}
^{‡} Sales+streaming figures based on certification alone.

== Controversy ==
This song was partially banned from YouTube after the 2017 Las Vegas shooting since the first shots were fired while Aldean was singing this song at the end of the concert.
