= Tonight Looks Good on You =

Single by Jason Aldean

from the album Old Boots, New Dirt
- Released: March 23, 2015
- Recorded: 2013–14
- Genre: Country; R&B
- Length: 3:51
- Label: Broken Bow
- Songwriters: Dallas Davidson; Rhett Akins; Ashley Gorley
- Producer: Michael Knox

Jason Aldean singles chronology
"Just Gettin' Started" (2014)	"Tonight Looks Good on You" (2015)	"Gonna Know We Were Here" (2015)

"Tonight Looks Good on You" is a song written by Rhett Akins, Ashley Gorley, and Dallas Davidson and recorded by American country music artist Jason Aldean. It was released on March 23, 2015, as the third single from Aldean's 2014 album Old Boots, New Dirt.

== Critical reception ==
A review in Taste of Country was favorable, saying that "There’s something dangerous about Jason Aldean’s new single 'Tonight Looks Good on You,' and many of the love songs found on Old Boots, New Dirt. The story is familiar, but his delivery is unique and sincere." and "Lyrically the song separates itself from his previous late-night love songs".

== Music video ==
The music video was directed by Mason Dixon and premiered in May 2015. It shows Aldean performing the song by himself in a warehouse back lot at night, and in a separate scene surrounded by many strobe lights. Between this is a storyline about a man who is working overtime at a factory who desperately longs to go home to his wife. After he is scolded by his boss for not paying attention to his job, he notices another worker (played by Aldean) who is just getting off. After discussing his issue, Aldean agrees to finish the job for him so he can get home. Meanwhile, his wife is seen at home desperately waiting for his return as she is getting ready to go out with him. After packing up his things, he finally returns home in a pickup truck and she jumps into his arms; the two then enjoy their date. Back at the factory, the boss returns only to see Aldean finishing the job the main character was supposed to finish. Shocked, the boss leaves without saying a word, leaving Aldean to finish the job.

== Chart performance ==
The song has sold 529,000 copies in the US as of September 2015.

Chart (2015)	Peak position
Canada Hot 100 (Billboard)	32
Canada Country (Billboard)	1
US Billboard Hot 100	46
US Country Airplay (Billboard)	1
US Hot Country Songs (Billboard)	6

=== Year-end charts ===
Chart (2015)	Position
US Country Airplay (Billboard)	17
US Hot Country Songs (Billboard)	24
