= Let Your Boys Be Country =

Single by Jason Aldean

from the album Highway Desperado
- Released: November 27, 2023
- Genre: Country
- Length: 3:15
- Label: BBR
- Songwriters: Jaron Boyer; Allison Veltz Cruz; Micah Wilshire
- Producer: Michael Knox

Jason Aldean singles chronology
"Try That in a Small Town" (2023)	"Let Your Boys Be Country" (2023)	"Whiskey Drink" (2024)

Music video
- "Let Your Boys Be Country" on YouTube

"Let Your Boys Be Country" is a song by American country music singer Jason Aldean. It was released on August 25, 2023 as a promotional single for his eleventh studio album Highway Desperado (2023), before being sent to country radio on November 27, 2023 as the album's second single. The song was written by Allison Veltz Cruz, Jaron Boyer, and Micah Wilshire.

== Content ==
The song is about a young boy growing up and becoming a man in a country setting. Aldean said he thought the song would be relevant, as he is a father of two children himself. Both of his children and his wife appear in the song's corresponding music video. Chris Piner of American Songwriter wrote that the song's lyrics are about "taking pride in his country, learning about southern manners, and wanting nothing more than to spend hours and hours outside".

== Charts ==
=== Weekly charts ===
Weekly chart performance for "Let Your Boys Be Country"
Chart (2023–2024)	Peak position
Canada Country (Billboard)	10
US Billboard Hot 100	83
US Country Airplay (Billboard)	3
US Hot Country Songs (Billboard)	22

=== Year-end charts ===
2024 year-end chart performance for "Let Your Boys Be Country"
Chart (2024)	Position
US Country Airplay (Billboard)	30
US Hot Country Songs (Billboard)	64
