= Old Boots, New Dirt =

Studio album by Jason Aldean
- Released: October 7, 2014
- Recorded: 2013–14
- Length: 44:13
- Label: Broken Bow
- Producer: Michael Knox

Jason Aldean chronology
Night Train (2012)	Old Boots, New Dirt (2014)	They Don't Know (2016)

Singles from Old Boots, New Dirt
- 1. "Burnin' It Down" Released: July 22, 2014; 2. "Just Gettin' Started" Released: November 10, 2014; 3. "Tonight Looks Good on You" Released: March 23, 2015; 4. "Gonna Know We Were Here" Released: August 17, 2015

Old Boots, New Dirt is the sixth studio album by American country music artist Jason Aldean. It was released on October 7, 2014 via Broken Bow Records. Its lead single, "Burnin' It Down," reached the top of the US Hot Country Songs chart during its second week of availability. The album was produced by Aldean's longtime producer Michael Knox. The album's second single, "Just Gettin' Started," was released on November 10, 2014. "Tonight Looks Good on You" was released as the album's third single. "Gonna Know We Were Here" was released as the album's fourth single.

A deluxe edition containing three bonus tracks was available exclusively at Target beginning in 2015. Alongside this, a limited edition contained the DVD concert "Night Train to Georgia."

== Content ==
The album's lead single, "Burnin' It Down," was inspired by R&B music. Florida Georgia Line, who co-wrote the song with Rodney Clawson and Chris Tompkins, originally planned on recording "Burnin' It Down" until Aldean expressed interest in the song.

== Critical reception ==
Professional ratings
Aggregate scores
Source	Rating
Metacritic	54/100
Review scores
Source	Rating
Billboard	3.5/5 stars
Newsday	B
Under the Gun	(6.5/10)
The New York Times	(Favourable)
AllMusic	3.5/5 stars
The Boston Globe	(Neutral)
Rolling Stone	2.5/5 stars
PopMatters	(2/10)

The album received a metacritic score of 54, indicating mixed or average reviews. Stephen Thomas Erlewine of Allmusic thought the title Old Boots, New Dirt reflected the album's content, saying that "Aldean's boots are getting a bit worn; he's no longer an upstart," nevertheless there were some freshness in the album, with modern electronics accentuating the singer's arena country songs. He judged the album's "casual, almost steely, assurance" made it one of Aldean's best. Chuck Dauphin of Billboard also thought the album was a mixture of the party songs Aldean is known for, but he "also shows a little bit more of an emotional and sensual side than listeners might be accustomed to." Jon Caramanica of The New York Times believed that Aldean had fully emerged as a "purveyor of love songs," and excelled at songs like "Show You Off" and "Tryin’ to Love Me."

Jon Dolan of Rolling Stone felt that the album had gone further into pop territory. Jim Casey of Country Weekly also noted the "R&B and pop overtones" of some of the songs. Casey also thought that apart from a few upbeat songs and a "hidden gem" of a song in "Two Night Town," the rest were "ho-hum mid-tempos and ballads that don’t move the meter much in either direction." Marc Hirsh of The Boston Globe considered the album to be "all ambition and no boldness, a solidly constructed modern country album without much in the way of inspiration."

== Commercial performance ==
The album debuted at number 1 on the Billboard 200. It is Aldean's second album to reach number one on the chart, following his 2012 album Night Train. The album was originally predicted to sell up to 400,000 in its first week in the US. However, it only sold 278,000 copies. On December 8, 2014, the album was officially certified Platinum by the RIAA for shipping over 1 million copies. In July 2015, Old Boots, New Dirt reached its millionth sales mark in the United States. As of November 2016, the album has sold 1,150,200 copies in the US.

In Canada, the album debuted at number 1 on the Canadian Albums Chart, selling 16,000 copies.

== Track listing ==
No.	Title	Writer(s)	Length
1.	"Just Gettin' Started"	Chris DeStefano; Rhett Akins; Ashley Gorley	3:15
2.	"Show You Off"	Neil Thrasher; Tony Martin; Brett Beavers	3:08
3.	"Burnin' It Down"	Rodney Clawson; Chris Tompkins; Tyler Hubbard; Brian Kelley	3:39
4.	"Tryin' to Love Me"	Thrasher; Wendell Mobley; Hillary Lindsey	3:45
5.	"Sweet Little Somethin'"	David Lee Murphy; Ben Hayslip; Marv Green	3:24
6.	"Laid Back"	Michael Tyler; Jaron Boyer; Adam Shoenfeld	3:04
7.	"Tonight Looks Good on You"	Akins; Gorley; Dallas Davidson	3:51
8.	"Too Fast"	Chris Stapleton; Lee Thomas Miller	3:22
9.	"If My Truck Could Talk"	Mobley; Thrasher; Andrew Pates	3:30
10.	"Old Boots, New Dirt"	Thrasher; Miller; Tom Shapiro	2:53
11.	"I Took It with Me"	Murphy; Hayslip	3:02
12.	"Don't Change Gone"	Thrasher; Michael Dulaney; Martin	2:56
13.	"Miss That Girl"	Murphy; Ross Copperman	2:55
14.	"Gonna Know We Were Here"	Beavers; Brett James	3:44
15.	"Two Night Town"	James; Tim Nichols	3:20

Deluxe Edition (Target exclusive)
No.	Title	Writer(s)	Length
16.	"Fast Lanes"	Adam Craig; Josh Thompson; Michael Howard	3:42
17.	"Too Much You for Me"	Vicky McGehee; Brian Davis; John Edwards	3:15
18.	"Ain't No Easy Way"	James; Terry Clayton; Kevin Mason	3:32

== Personnel ==
Musicians

- Jason Aldean – lead vocals, backing vocals
- Tony Harrell – keyboards, acoustic piano, Wurlitzer electric piano, Hammond B3 organ, synthesizers, strings
- Charlie Judge – Hammond B3 organ
- Kurt Allison – electric guitar
- Danny Rader – acoustic guitar, 12-string guitar, hi-string guitar, banjo, bouzouki
- Adam Shoenfeld – acoustic guitar, electric guitar, EBow
- Mike Johnson – steel guitar, lap steel guitar
- Russ Pahl – steel guitar
- Tully Kennedy – bass
- Rich Redmond – drums, percussion, drum programming
- Marv Green – drum programming
- Chris Tompkins – drum programming
- Perry Coleman – backing vocals
- Shelly Fairchild – backing vocals
- Wes Hightower – backing vocals
- Chris Stapleton – backing vocals
- Neil Thrasher – backing vocals

Production and Technical

- Michael Knox – producer
- Peter Coleman – recording, mixing
- Mickey Jack Cones – vocal recording, editing
- Sam Martin – assistant engineer
- Evan Owen – assistant engineer
- Brandon Epps – editing
- Richard Dodd – mastering
- Shalacy Griffin – production assistant
- Jayme Calhoun – label copy, licensing
- Spalding Entertainment – management

Visuals

- Jen Joe – creative direction
- Glenn Sweitzer – art direction, design
- Jim Wright – photography
- John Murphy – wardrobe stylist
- Kelly Henderson – hair, make-up

== Charts ==
=== Weekly charts ===
Chart (2014–15)	Peak position
Australian Albums (ARIA)	13
Canadian Albums (Billboard)	1
US Billboard 200	1
US Top Country Albums (Billboard)	1
US Independent Albums (Billboard)	1

=== Year-end charts ===
Chart (2014)	Position
US Billboard 200	28
US Top Country Albums (Billboard)	7
US Independent Albums (Billboard)	2
Chart (2015)	Position
US Billboard 200	25
US Top Country Albums (Billboard)	4
US Independent Albums (Billboard)	1
Chart (2016)	Position
US Top Country Albums (Billboard)	51
US Independent Albums (Billboard)	24

=== Decade-end charts ===
Chart (2010–2019)	Position
US Billboard 200	166

== Certifications ==
Region	Certification	Certified units/sales
United States (RIAA)	Platinum	1,000,000 / 1,150,200
