= Whiskey Drink =

2023 song by Jason Aldean

Single by Jason Aldean

from the album Highway Desperado
- Released: July 29, 2024
- Genre: Country
- Length: 3:10
- Label: BBR
- Songwriters: Kurt Allison; Jonathan Edwards; Tully Kennedy; John Morgan
- Producer: Michael Knox

Jason Aldean singles chronology
"Let Your Boys Be Country" (2023)	"Whiskey Drink" (2024)	"How Far Does a Goodbye Go" (2025)

Music video
- "Whiskey Drink" on YouTube

"Whiskey Drink" is a song by American country music singer Jason Aldean. It was first released on October 6, 2023 as a promotional single for his eleventh studio album Highway Desperado (2023), before being sent to country radio on July 29, 2024 as the album's third single. The song was written by Kurt Allison, Jonathan Edwards, Tully Kennedy and John Morgan and produced by Michael Knox. The song would peak at number two on the Country Airplay chart for three weeks, being blocked from number one by Morgan Wallen's "I'm the Problem".

== Composition ==
"Whiskey Drink" is a midtempo song that centers around a man who is drinking whiskey and smoking to deal with his heartache from a breakup, in an attempt to forget about his former lover.

== Music video ==
An official music video was released on November 8, 2024. It depicts the story of the song in between clips of Jason Aldean performing in front of Nashville, Tennessee, showing a somber man at the bar. He is drinking from a bottle in a brown paper bag, as memories of joyful occasions with the woman he loved flash in his mind. At the end of the video, he wakes up after the night and moves on by taking out photos of him and his ex and stuffing them in an empty bottle which he tosses into a river.

== Charts ==
=== Weekly charts ===
Weekly chart performance for "Whiskey Drink"
Chart (2024–2025)	Peak position
Australia Country Hot 50 (The Music)	3
Canada Country (Billboard)	39
US Billboard Hot 100	77
US Country Airplay (Billboard)	2
US Hot Country Songs (Billboard)	24

=== Year-end charts ===
Year-end chart performance for "Whiskey Drink"
Chart (2025)	Position
US Country Airplay (Billboard)	10
US Hot Country Songs (Billboard)	63
