= Burnin' It Down =

Single by Jason Aldean

from the album Old Boots, New Dirt
- Released: July 22, 2014
- Recorded: 2013–14
- Genre: Country trap; R&B; country pop
- Length: 3:39
- Label: Broken Bow
- Songwriters: Rodney Clawson; Chris Tompkins; Tyler Hubbard; Brian Kelley
- Producer: Michael Knox

Jason Aldean singles chronology
"When She Says Baby" (2013)	"Burnin' It Down" (2014)	"Just Gettin' Started" (2014)

"Burnin' It Down" is a song written by Rodney Clawson, Chris Tompkins and then-Florida Georgia Line members Tyler Hubbard and Brian Kelley and recorded by American country music artist Jason Aldean. It was released in July 2014 as the first single from Aldean's 2014 album Old Boots, New Dirt. The song won the "Top Country Song" category at the 2015 Billboard Music Awards, but polarized critics.

== Content ==
The song is a midtempo ballad about a sexual encounter with a lover, inspired by R&B music. Florida Georgia Line, two of the song's co-writers, originally planned on recording it until Aldean expressed interest in the song.

Aldean told Country Music Television (CMT) that he considered the song "baby making music". He also felt that it was a different song style for him due to it being more sexual in nature and featuring a drum loop.

== Critical reception ==
The single has polarized critics. Leeann Ward of Country Universe gave the song a D grade, writing that "There’s a line between a passionate love song and a passionless song. There’s [also] a line between a sexy song and a sex filled song. And there’s [even] a line between a classy, passionate love song and a classless, passionless sex filled song." Ward also said that “Burnin’ it Down” crosses the line to the latter categories on all accounts."

Giving it a B grade, Tammy Ragusa of Country Weekly was more favorable, writing that "Jason [Aldean] proves [that] he can also change things up, which he does dramatically through edgy, urban-and-pop-influenced arrangements and production" and that "the song's sexy lyrics push the boundaries of what might be construed as traditional themes in country music." In a review of Old Boots, New Dirt for Billboard, Chuck Dauphin praised "Burnin' It Down" as "the most musically adventurous track that Aldean has ever recorded".

== Commercial performance ==
During its first week in release, the song sold 184,000 downloads in the United States and debuted at number 42 on Billboard's Hot Country Songs chart. In its second week, the song moved from number 42 to 1 on the Hot Country Songs chart. On September 29, 2014, the song was certified Platinum by the RIAA just nine weeks after release, becoming the fastest single of 2014 to do that. It reached its millionth sales mark in October 2014. As of April 2015, the song has sold 1,589,000 copies in the US.

In Canada, the song sold 15,000 downloads in its debut week.

== Music video ==
The music video was directed by Wes Edwards and premiered in August 2014.

== Charts and certifications ==
=== Weekly charts ===
Chart (2014–2015)	Peak position
Canada Hot 100 (Billboard)	12
Canada Country (Billboard)	2
US Billboard Hot 100	12
US Country Airplay (Billboard)	1
US Hot Country Songs (Billboard)	1

=== Certifications ===
Region	Certification	Certified units/sales
United States (RIAA)	2× Platinum	1,589,000

=== Year-end charts ===
Chart (2014)	Position
Canada (Canadian Hot 100)	92
US Billboard Hot 100	63
US Country Airplay (Billboard)	15
US Hot Country Songs (Billboard)	2

Chart (2015)	Position
US Hot Country Songs (Billboard)	84

=== Decade-end charts ===
Chart (2010–2019)	Position
US Hot Country Songs (Billboard)	17
