= John Morgan (singer) =

American singer-songwriter (born 1995)

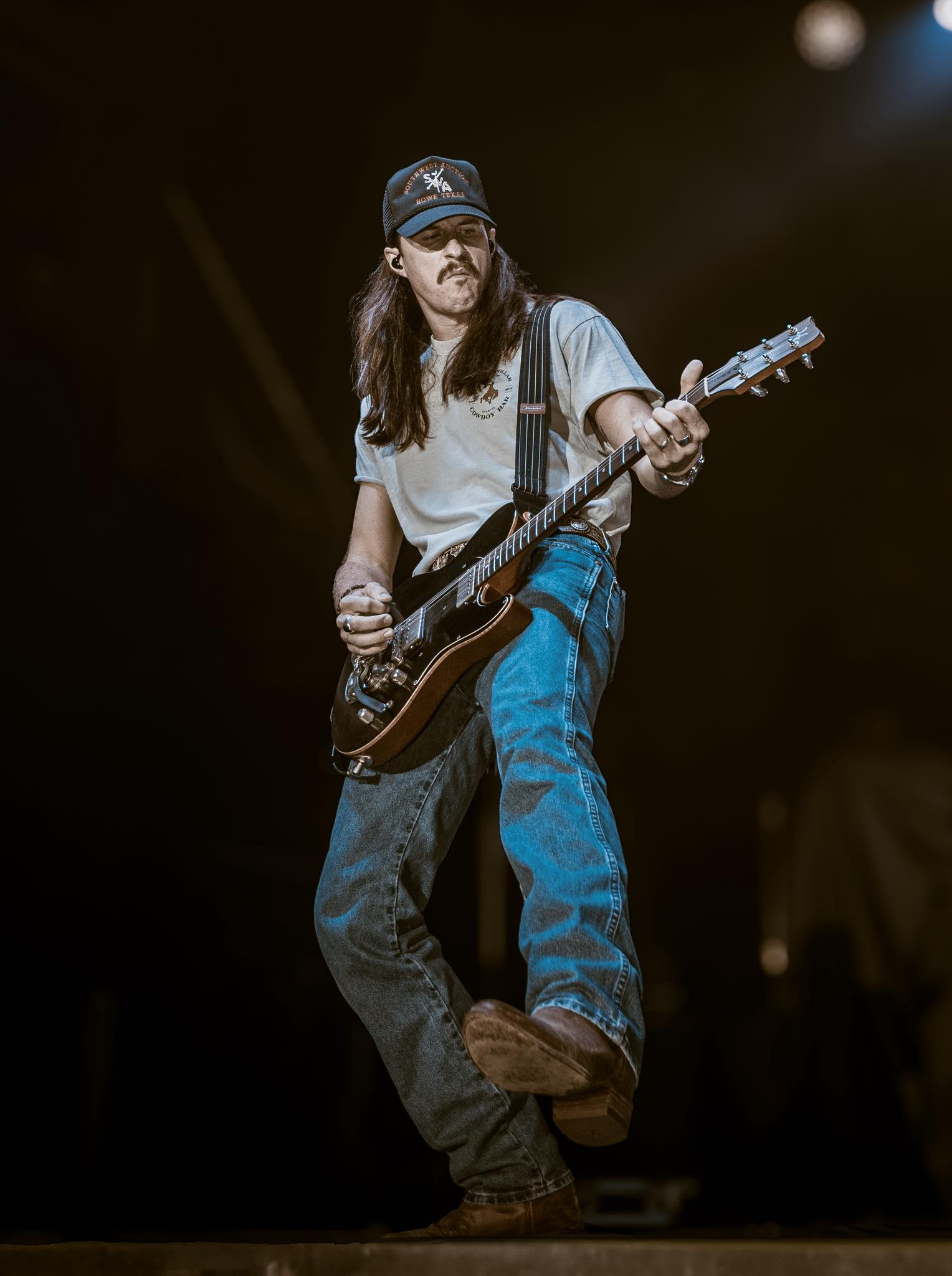
- Morgan in Massachusetts 2025

Background information
- Born: August 8, 1995 (age 31); Sylva, North Carolina, U.S.
- Genre: Country
- Occupation: Singer-songwriter
- Instruments: Vocals; guitar
- Years active: 2021–present
- Label: BBR
- Website: johnmorganmusic.com

John Morgan (born August 8, 1995) is an American country music singer-songwriter from Sylva, North Carolina signed to BBR Music Group.

== Background ==
John Morgan was born in Sylva, a town in the Great Smoky Mountains southwest of Asheville, North Carolina and got his start touring the summer festival circuit in a family bluegrass band for 10 years before turning to songwriting and moving to Nashville. A songwriting session with Kurt Allison and Tully Kennedy, two of Jason Aldean's band members, led to Morgan landing eight cuts on Aldean's Macon, Georgia album including all three of its hit singles, "If I Didn't Love You", "Trouble with a Heartbreak", and "That's What Tequila Does". Aldean signed Morgan to his Night Train imprint under BBR Music Group.

Morgan competed in American Song Contest (2022), representing his home state of North Carolina, performing "Right in the Middle". "Friends Like That" was released as Morgan's debut single to country radio on April 22, 2024. Originally a solo cut, it was redone to feature Aldean for the radio release. His debut album, Carolina Blue, was released on April 25, 2025.

== Discography ==
=== Studio albums ===
List of EPs, with selected details
Title	Album details
Carolina Blue	Release date: April 25, 2025; Label: BBR Music Group; Format: CD, digital download, streaming

=== Extended plays ===
List of EPs, with selected details
Title	EP details
Remember Us	Release date: October 6, 2023; Label: BBR Music Group; Format: Digital download, streaming

=== Singles ===
List of singles, with selected chart positions
Title	Year	Peak chart positions					Album
Title	Year	US	US Country	US Country Airplay	CAN	CAN Country	Album
"Friends Like That" (featuring Jason Aldean)	2024	57	16	2	74	1	Carolina Blue
"Kid Myself"	2025	57	16	1	—	16	Carolina Blue
"Cry Baby"	2026	—	—	—	—	—	TBD
"—" denotes a recording that did not chart.
