= Country Airplay =

Chart published weekly by Billboard magazine

Country Airplay is a chart published weekly by Billboard magazine in the United States since October 20, 2012, although the magazine also retrospectively recognizes the Hot Country Songs charts from January 20, 1990, through October 13, 2012, as part of the history of the Country Airplay listing. The chart lists the 60 most-listened-to records played on 150 mainstream country radio stations across the country as monitored by Nielsen BDS, weighted to each station's Nielsen ratings.

The first number-one song actually published under the Country Airplay banner was "Take a Little Ride" by Jason Aldean; but as Billboard also recognizes the history of the Hot Country Songs chart since 1990 as part of this chart, the magazine recognizes the first chart-topper as "Nobody's Home" by Clint Black.

== History ==
=== Earlier versions ===
Throughout its history of ranking country songs by popularity, Billboard has had several different airplay-only charts to measure the top-played songs on radio stations. The first of these was called "Country & Western Records Most Played By Folk Disk Jockeys", and debuted with the December 10, 1949, issue. Like the other charts of the time, the number of positions was not standardized; the chart had anywhere from eight to 15 positions, varying from week to week. The chart, which had several other names, continued until October 13, 1958, when it was merged with the "best sellers" chart to become the Hot Country Songs chart.

Starting with the October 20, 1984 issue, there were separate charts for radio airplay and singles sales, similar to the Hot 100 Airplay and Singles Sales charts that also debuted with this issue, it was a component chart that helped determine placement on the Hot Country Singles chart. The airplay chart was discontinued in 1987 as Hot Country songs became solely based on disc jockey reports, but the sales chart continued until 1989.

With effect from the issue dated January 20, 1990, the Hot Country Singles chart began to be based solely on country music radio airplay as opposed to a combination of airplay and physical sales. At this time the chart consisted of 75 positions. Four weeks later, on February 17, the chart was retitled "Hot Country Singles & Tracks" to reflect the fact that songs which had not been released as singles could chart based on airplay. Beginning with the January 13, 2001, issue, the chart was cut from 75 to 60 positions, and effective April 30, 2005 the chart was renamed "Hot Country Songs".

=== Current chart ===
Beginning with the chart dated October 20, 2012, Billboard changed the methodology of Hot Country Songs to again incorporate sales and now also include streaming. In addition, the airplay component of the chart now factored in plays on stations of all genres instead of the previous genre-specific radio panel. At this point a second chart called Country Airplay was launched, based only on country radio airplay. Billboard now recognizes the Hot Country Songs charts from January 20, 1990, until October 13, 2012, as part of the history of both listings.

Music historian Joel Whitburn, in the 2017 edition of his Top Country Singles books which tabulate every artist and song to have made the Billboard country music charts, observed that after the split of Hot Country Songs and Country Airplay in 2012, the country music industry generally favored the latter chart. In particular, he cited the fact that "We Are Never Ever Getting Back Together" by Taylor Swift spent ten weeks at number one on Hot Country Songs but peaked at number 13 on Country Airplay due to poor reception at country radio. He also observed that the Academy of Country Music and Country Music Association continue to cite Country Airplay positions, and that the syndicated radio show American Country Countdown also continues to use the Country Airplay chart. By comparison, Whitburn observed that the Hot Country Songs chart often includes "album cuts from superstar album releases and songs from reality show contestants" which "tend to have very little lasting impact on audiences and are almost completely ignored by radio stations that depend on strong ratings to survive."

== Chart policies ==
As with most other Billboard charts, the Country Airplay chart features a rule for when a song enters recurrent rotation. Starting with the chart week of December 2, 2006, a song is declared recurrent on the country charts if it has been on the charts longer than 20 weeks; is not gaining in spins or audience impressions; and is lower than 10 in rank for either audience impressions or spins. Since December 2008, any song that is ranked below #10 in spins or audience and has not shown an increase in audience or spins for more than two weeks is also declared recurrent, even if it has not charted for 20 weeks.

== Chart achievements ==
Chart achievements listed below cover Country Airplay since its launch in 2012 as well as Hot Country Songs between 1990 and 2012.

=== Most weeks at number one ===
Total	Song	Artist(s)	Year(s)	ref
10	"You Proof"	Morgan Wallen	2022–2023	
10	"World on Fire"	Nate Smith	2023–2024	
8	"Amazed"	Lonestar	1999	
8	"It's Five O'Clock Somewhere"	Alan Jackson and Jimmy Buffett	2003	
8	"Last Night"	Morgan Wallen	2023	
8	"I'm the Problem"	Morgan Wallen	2025	
7	"The Good Stuff"	Kenny Chesney	2002	
7	"Have You Forgotten?"	Darryl Worley	2003	
7	"There Goes My Life"	Kenny Chesney	2003–2004	
7	"Live Like You Were Dying"	Tim McGraw	2004	
7	"Beautiful Crazy"	Luke Combs	2019	
7	"A Bar Song (Tipsy)"	Shaboozey	2024	

=== Longest climbs to number-one ===
Total	Song	Artist	Year (Note: Each song reached number one in the year given.)	ref
67	"Time's Ticking"	Justin Moore	2026	
66	"Kid Myself"	John Morgan	2026	
65	"After a Few"	Travis Denning	2020	
65	"Whiskey and Rain"	Michael Ray	2022	
63	"In Between"	Scotty McCreery	2020	
62	"Can't Have Mine"	Dylan Scott	2023	
60	"23"	Chayce Beckham	2024	
58	"Make Me Want To"	Jimmie Allen	2020	
56	"Single Saturday Night"	Cole Swindell	2021	
56	"To Be Loved by You"	Parker McCollum	2022	
56	"Gonna Love You"	Parmalee	2024	

=== Most number-ones ===
Total	Artist	Source(s)
34	Kenny Chesney	
30	Blake Shelton	
29	Tim McGraw	
27	Jason Aldean	
26	Alan Jackson	
26	George Strait	
26	Luke Bryan	
23	Morgan Wallen	
21	Keith Urban	
21	Thomas Rhett	
21	Luke Combs	

=== Most number-ones by women ===
Total	Artist	Source(s)
16	Carrie Underwood	
11	Reba McEntire	
9	Faith Hill	
7	Shania Twain	
7	Taylor Swift	
7	Miranda Lambert	
6	Dixie Chicks	
6	Ella Langley	
5	Trisha Yearwood	
5	Martina McBride	
5	Sara Evans	
5	Kelsea Ballerini	
5	Lainey Wilson	
5	Lauren Alaina	

=== Most number-ones by duos or groups ===
Total	Duo/Group	Source(s)
20	Brooks & Dunn	
16	Florida Georgia Line	
14	Rascal Flatts	
13	Zac Brown Band	
11	Lady Antebellum	
9	Lonestar	
8	Dan + Shay	
7	Alabama	
7	Old Dominion	
6	Dixie Chicks	

=== Most top 10 entries ===
Total	Artist	Source
62	Kenny Chesney	
61	George Strait	
61	Tim McGraw	
51	Alan Jackson	
44	Keith Urban	
42	Jason Aldean	
41	Brooks & Dunn	
39	Blake Shelton	
37	Reba McEntire	
37	Luke Bryan	

=== Most top 10 entries by men ===
Total	Artist	Source
62	Kenny Chesney	
61	George Strait	
61	Tim McGraw	
51	Alan Jackson	
44	Keith Urban	
42	Jason Aldean	
41	Brooks & Dunn	
39	Blake Shelton	
37	Luke Bryan	
36	Garth Brooks	

=== Most top 10 entries by women ===
Total	Artist	Source
37	Reba McEntire	
31	Carrie Underwood	
23	Faith Hill	
20	Martina McBride	
19	Trisha Yearwood	
19	Taylor Swift	
16	Shania Twain	
15	Miranda Lambert	
14	Dixie Chicks	
14	Patty Loveless	

=== Most top 10 entries by duos or groups ===
Total	Duo/Group	Source
41	Brooks & Dunn	
32	Rascal Flatts	
24	Alabama	
19	Diamond Rio	
19	Florida Georgia Line	
18	Lonestar	
17	Zac Brown Band	
16	Montgomery Gentry	
15	Lady Antebellum	
14	Dixie Chicks	

=== Most entries ===
Total	Artist	Source
101	Kenny Chesney	
100	George Strait	
93	Garth Brooks	
90	Tim McGraw	
82	Alan Jackson	
73	Reba McEntire	
65	Blake Shelton	
62	Brooks & Dunn	
56	Martina McBride	
55	Brad Paisley	
55	Rascal Flatts	

=== Most entries by women ===
Total	Artist	Source
73	Reba McEntire	
56	Martina McBride	
51	Trisha Yearwood	
50	Carrie Underwood	
48	Faith Hill	
40	Taylor Swift	
39	Miranda Lambert	
35	LeAnn Rimes	
35	Shania Twain	
34	Patty Loveless	

=== Most entries by men ===
Total	Artist	Source
101	Kenny Chesney	
100	George Strait	
93	Garth Brooks	
90	Tim McGraw	
82	Alan Jackson	
65	Blake Shelton	
62	Brooks & Dunn	
55	Brad Paisley	
55	Rascal Flatts	
52	Keith Urban	

=== Most entries by duos or groups ===
Total	Duo/Group	Source(s)
62	Brooks & Dunn	
55	Rascal Flatts	
45	Alabama	
37	Lonestar	
33	Diamond Rio	
33	Lady Antebellum	
32	Montgomery Gentry	
31	Little Big Town	
28	Zac Brown Band	
27	Dixie Chicks	

== Use in media ==
Since September 2017, the Country Airplay chart has served as the data source for the weekly radio program American Country Countdown.

== See also ==
- List of years in country music
