= David Lee Murphy discography =

- Studio albums: 5
- Compilation albums: 1
- Singles: 15
- Music videos: 11
- Number one singles: 2

American country music singer-songwriter David Lee Murphy has released five studio albums one compilation album and fifteen singles. Eleven of these singles were released between 1994 and 1997 for MCA Records Nashville, with his highest chart entry in this timespan being "Dust on the Bottle", a No. 1 single on Hot Country Songs in 1995. Murphy returned to the charts in 2004 with "Loco", released on Koch/Audium from his fourth studio album and the second No. 1 single of his career "Everything's Gonna Be Alright" from his fifth studio album released on Reviver Records.

== Studio albums ==
| Title | Album details | Peak chart positions | | | | | Certifications /Sales |
| Title | Album details | US Country | US | US Heat | US Indie | CAN Country | Certifications /Sales |
|---|---|---|---|---|---|---|---|
| Out with a Bang | Release date: August 30, 1994; Label: MCA; Formats: CD, cassette, download | 10 | 52 | 1 | — | 2 | CAN: Gold; US: Platinum |
| Gettin' Out the Good Stuff | Release date: May 21, 1996; Label: MCA; Formats: CD, cassette, download | 12 | 104 | — | — | 6 | |
| We Can't All Be Angels | Release date: September 23, 1997; Label: MCA; Formats: CD, cassette, download | 39 | — | — | — | — | |
| Tryin' to Get There | Release date: March 23, 2004; Label: Audium/Koch; Formats: CD | 46 | — | — | 32 | — | |
| No Zip Code | Release date: April 6, 2018; Label: Reviver; Formats: CD, download | 35 | — | — | 20 | — | US: 5,900 |
"—" denotes releases that did not chart

== Singles ==
| Year | Single | Peak chart positions | | | | Certifications | Sales | Album |
| Year | Single | US Country | US Country Airplay | US | CAN Country (Note: Positions from RPM until 2000, Radio & Records in 2004, and Canada Country from 2017 onwards.) | Certifications | Sales | Album |
|---|---|---|---|---|---|---|---|---|
| 1994 | "Just Once" | 36 | | — | 28 | | | Out with a Bang |
| 1994 | "Fish Ain't Bitin'" | 52 | | — | 35 | | | Out with a Bang |
| 1995 | "Party Crowd" | 6 | | — | 7 | | | Out with a Bang |
| 1995 | "Dust on the Bottle" | 1 | | — | 9 | RIAA: Platinum | | Out with a Bang |
| 1995 | "Out with a Bang" | 13 | | — | 5 | | | Out with a Bang |
| 1996 | "Every Time I Get Around You" | 2 | | — | 2 | | | Gettin' Out the Good Stuff |
| 1996 | "The Road You Leave Behind" | 5 | | — | 12 | | | Gettin' Out the Good Stuff |
| 1997 | "Genuine Rednecks" | 53 | | — | 84 | | | Gettin' Out the Good Stuff |
| 1997 | "Breakfast in Birmingham" | 51 | | — | 34 | | | Gettin' Out the Good Stuff |
| 1997 | "All Lit Up in Love" | 25 | | — | 21 | | | We Can't All Be Angels |
| 1997 | "Just Don't Wait Around 'Til She's Leavin'" | 37 | | — | 52 | | | We Can't All Be Angels |
| 2004 | "Loco" | 5 | | 44 | 9 | | | Tryin' to Get There |
| 2004 | "Inspiration" (featuring Lee Roy Parnell) | 46 | | — | — | | | Tryin' to Get There |
| 2017 | "Everything's Gonna Be Alright" (with Kenny Chesney) | 9 | 1 | 66 | 16 | RIAA: Platinum | US: 255,000 | No Zip Code |
| 2018 | "I Won't Be Sorry" | — | 52 | — | — | | | No Zip Code |
| 2019 | "No Zip Code" | — | — | — | — | | | No Zip Code |
"—" denotes releases that did not chart

== Other appearances ==
| Year | Title | Album |
|---|---|---|
| 1994 | "Just Once" | 8 Seconds (soundtrack) |
| 1997 | "Dust on the Bottle" | Crown Royal-Untamed & True: Country Music Tour |
| 1997 | "Gettin' Out the Good Stuff" | Crown Royal-Untamed & True: Country Music Tour |
| 1997 | "All Lit Up in Love" | Crown Royal-Untamed & True: Country Music Tour |
| 1998 | "We Can't All Be Angels" | Black Dog (soundtrack) |
| 2001 | "Hangin' On" | Dancin' with Thunder |
| 2017 | "Dust on the Bottle" (live with Kenny Chesney) | Kenny Chesney's Live in No Shoes Nation |

== Music videos ==
| Year | Video | Director |
|---|---|---|
| 1994 | "Just Once" | Charley Randazzo |
| 1994 | "Fish Ain't Bitin'" | Charley Randazzo |
| 1995 | "Party Crowd" | Chris Rogers |
| 1995 | "Dust on the Bottle" | Charley Randazzo |
| 1996 | "The Road You Leave Behind" | Michael Salomon |
| 1996 | "She's Really Something to See" | Michael Salomon |
| 1997 | "Genuine Rednecks" | Michael Merriman |
| 1997 | "All Lit Up in Love" | Michael Merriman |
| 1997 | "Just Don't Wait Around 'Til She's Leavin'" | Michael Merriman |
| 1998 | "We Can't All Be Angels" | Michael Merriman |
| 2017 | "Dust on the Bottle" (live with Kenny Chesney) | Shaun Silva |
