= Greatest Hits 1987–1997 =

Greatest hits album by George Fox
- Released: March 4, 1997
- Genre: Country
- Length: 52:13
- Label: Warner Music Canada

George Fox chronology
| Time of My Life (1995) | Greatest Hits 1987–1997 (1997) | Survivor (1998) |

Greatest Hits 1987–1997 is the first greatest hits album by Canadian country music artist George Fox. It was released by Warner Music Canada on March 4, 1997. The album was certified gold by the CRIA.

== Track listing ==
1. "No Trespassing" – 4:11
2. "Lime Rickey" – 2:50
3. "Spice of Life" – 3:27
4. "Here's Hoping (There'll Always Be a Cowboy)" – 4:10
5. "The Night the Barn Burned Down" – 3:48
6. "I Give You My Word" – 3:59
7. "Mustang Heart" – 4:12
8. "Clearly Canadian" – 3:35
9. "Goldmine" – 3:37
10. "What's Holding Me" – 3:38
11. "Wear and Tear on My Heart" – 3:49
12. "Breakfast Alone" – 3:57
13. "Angelina" – 3:25
14. "First Comes Love" – 3:35
