= List of songs written by David Lee Murphy =

This is an alphabetical list of songs written or co–written by the American songwriter David Lee Murphy.

"Song" – Artist(s) (co–writers)

== A ==
- "Again" - Aaron Lewis
- "Ain't Dead Yet" – Kevin Fowler
- "Ain't Much Left of Me" - Blackberry Smoke
- "All Lit Up in Love" – David Lee Murphy
- "Always the Love Songs" – Eli Young Band
- "Anywhere with You" - Jake Owen
- "Are You Gonna Kiss Me or Not" - Thompson Square

== B ==
- "Bar at the End of the World" – Kenny Chesney
- "Beer or Gasoline" – Chris Young
- "Better Than This" – Brad Paisley
- "Big Green Tractor" – Jason Aldean
- "Blind Desire" – Danny Tate
- "Breakfast in Birmingham" – David Lee Murphy
- "Broken Windshield View" - Chris Lane
- "Bump in The Road" - Greg Hanna

== C ==
- "Can't Turn It Off" – David Lee Murphy
- "Center of My World" – Chris Young
- "Custom Made" – Andy Griggs

== D ==
- "Dixie Boy Special" – The Lost Trailers
- "Dust on the Bottle" – David Lee Murphy

== E ==
- "Every Time I Get Around You" – David Lee Murphy
- "Everything I Shouldn't Be Thinking About" — Thompson Square
- Even the Stars Fall 4 You — Keith Urban
- Everything's Gonna Be Alright - David Lee Murphy/Kenny Chesney

== F ==
- "Fast Horse" – Trick Pony
- "A Feelin' Like That" – Gary Allan
- "Fish Ain't Bitin'" – David Lee Murphy

== G ==
- "Genuine Rednecks" – David Lee Murphy
- "Goes Down Easy" – Van Zant
- "Good One Comin' On" – Trent Willmon/Blackberry Smoke
- "Greatest Show on Earth" – David Lee Murphy

== H ==
- "Hangin' On" – David Lee Murphy
- "Henpecked Hero" – Killer Beaz
- "Here And Now" - Kenny Chesney
- "High Weeds and Rust" – Doug Stone, David Lee Murphy
- "Hillbilly Blues" – Trick Pony
- "Happy Man" – Trace Adkins

== I ==
- "I Break Everything I Touch" – Jason Aldean
- "I Can Live with That" – Trick Pony
- "I Pick My Parties" – Montgomery Gentry with Toby Keith
- "If It's the Last Thing I Do" –James Otto, Brooks & Dunn, Montgomery Gentry
- "It's Only Money" – Van Zant

== J ==
- "Just Don't Wait Around Til She's Leavin'" – David Lee Murphy
- "Just Enough to Get in Trouble" – Hank Williams, Jr.
- "Just Not Today" – Kenny Chesney
- "Just Once" – David Lee Murphy

== K ==
- "Kinda Like It" – Adam Brand

== L ==
- "Live a Little — Kenny Chesney
- "Living in Fast Forward" – Kenny Chesney
- "Loco" – David Lee Murphy
- "Lonesome USA" – Jason Aldean

== M ==
- "Mama 'n Them" – David Lee Murphy
- "Million Dollar View" - Trace Adkins
- "The More I Drink" – Blake Shelton
- "Muddy Up the Water" – Danny Tate

== N ==
- "Nobody's Perfect" – Danny Tate
- "Nothin's Gonna Slow Me Down" - Adam Brand
- "Now You're Talkin'" –Kevin Fowler, Montgomery Gentry

== O ==
- "On a Mission" – Trick Pony
- "The Only Way I Know" – Jason Aldean with Luke Bryan & Eric Church
- "Out with a Bang" – David Lee Murphy

== P ==
- "Party Crowd" – David Lee Murphy
- "Party Till the Money's All Gone" – Adam Brand
- "People Like Us" – Aaron Tippin
- "Pirate Flag" — Kenny Chesney
- "Pound Sign (#?*!)" - Kevin Fowler

== R ==
- Red Roses Won't Work Now Reba McEntire
- "The Road You Leave Behind" – David Lee Murphy

== S ==
- "Santa's Team" – Killer Beaz
- "Scatter the Ashes" – Chris LeDoux
- "She Means Everything To Me" - Greg Hanna
- "She's Really Something to See" – David Lee Murphy
- "Somebody Needs a Hug" — Keith Anderson
- "Spent" – Trick Pony
- "Stayin' Alive" – Danny Tate
- Sweet Little Something – Jason Aldean

== T ==
- "Til It's Gone" - Kenny Chesney
- "Time in a Bottle" – John Berry
- "Trouble With a Woman" – Rhett Akins

== W ==
- "We Can't All Be Angels" – David Lee Murphy
- "What's Not to Love" – Trick Pony
- "What Kind Of Love Are You On" - Greg Hanna
- "Why Can't People Just Get Along" – David Lee Murphy
- "Will You Marry Me?" – John Berry
- "Winnebago" – Kenny Chesney
- "Without a Doubt" – Betsy Hammer
- "Way Out Here" - Josh Thompson
