= Songs About Us =

Studio album by Jason Aldean
- Released: April 24, 2026
- Genres: Country; country rock
- Length: 67:28
- Labels: BBR; Macon
- Producer: Michael Knox

Jason Aldean chronology
30 Number One Hits (2025)	Songs About Us (2026)

Singles from Songs About Us
- 1. "How Far Does a Goodbye Go" Released: September 12, 2025; 2. "Don't Tell on Me" Released: March 2, 2026; 3. "Anytime Soon" Released: August 3, 2026

Songs About Us is the twelfth studio album by American country music artist Jason Aldean. The album was released on April 24, 2026, via BBR Music Group and Aldean's Macon Music. It was produced by Aldean's longtime collaborator Michael Knox.

The album is Aldean's first release of original music in three years since 2023's Highway Desperado.

== Background ==
On September 12, 2025, Aldean released the album's lead single, "How Far Does a Goodbye Go", which debuted in the top 20 of the Billboard Country Airplay chart. The track has been labeled by critics as a return to form, as Aldean returns to the familiar sounds of his early career.

Aldean officially announced the album on November 7, 2025, alongside a surprise release of three tracks: "Help You Remember", "Hard to Love You", and "Lovin' Me Too Long". The album also features three duets with Luke Bryan on the title track, David Lee Murphy on his self-penned "Dust on the Bottle", and Aldean's wife, Brittany, on "Easier Gone".

"Don't Tell on Me" was serviced to country radio on March 2, 2026, as the album's second single.

== Themes ==
"Help You Remember" is inspired by Aldean's experience with family members with dementia and his contributions to the Alzheimer's Foundation of America (AFA).

On the album's title, Aldean said:

"It means the world when one of my songs helps someone through a hard time—or celebrates their best moments. This album is about all of that—the highs, the lows, and everything in between. Every track started with a real story or feeling, and together we turned those experiences into music. In the end, I realized this album is about all of us. These are songs about us."

The opening track, "Anytime Soon", is a nod to Ronnie Milsap due to the unique opening of organs, which Aldean described as a fresh way to open his new album.

== Critical reception ==
Professional ratings
Review scores
Source	Rating
AllMusic	3/5 stars
Country Central	6.8
Rolling Stone	2.5/5 stars
Sputnikmusic	1/5 stars

Jonathan Bernstein of Rolling Stone gave the album two and a half stars out of five, descripting is a "well-wrought but standard fare." James Daykin of Entertainment Focus called the album Aldean's best in a decade, but "not because it reinvents him, but because it refocuses him," with praise for leaning hard on the country rock sound reminiscent of his earlier albums.

== Track listing ==
No.	Title	Writer(s)	Length
1.	"Anytime Soon"	Kurt Allison; John Edwards; Tully Kennedy; John Morgan	4:33
2.	"Drinking About You"	Allison; Edwards; Kennedy; Morgan	3:02
3.	"Don't Tell on Me"	Allison; Kennedy; Morgan; Lydia Vaughan	3:04
4.	"How Far Does a Goodbye Go"	Allison; Edwards; Kennedy; Morgan	3:56
5.	"Songs About Us" (with Luke Bryan)	Allison; Edwards; Kennedy; Morgan	2:52
6.	"Good Thing Going"	Allison; Kennedy; Morgan; Vaughan	2:56
7.	"She's Why"	Allison; Kennedy; Morgan; Vaughan	2:56
8.	"Backroads of My Memory"	Allison; Kennedy; Morgan; Vaughan	3:38
9.	"Dust on the Bottle" (with David Lee Murphy)	Murphy	3:49
10.	"The High Road"	Jason Aldean; Allison; Kennedy; Brandon Kinney; Josh Thompson	3:46
11.	"Easier Gone" (with Brittany Aldean)	Charles Kelley; Josh Kerr; Dave Haywood; Jimmy Robbins	3:46
12.	"Help You Remember"	Aldean; Allison; Kennedy; Morgan; Vaughan	3:51
13.	"Country Into Rock 'n' Roll"	Allison; Kennedy; Morgan; Vaughan	3:07
14.	"What's a Little Heartache"	Allison; Edwards; Kennedy; Morgan	2:53
15.	"One Last Look"	Allison; Edwards; Morgan; Vaughan	3:13
16.	"Fight a Fire"	Allison; Kennedy; Morgan; Vaughan	3:47
17.	"Hard to Love You"	Allison; Kennedy; Morgan; Vaughan	3:39
18.	"Little Hometown Left"	Jordan Gray; Ben Hayslip; Danny Majic; Cole Taylor	2:56
19.	"Her Favorite Color"	Allison; Kennedy; Lee Thomas Miller; Neil Thrasher	3:17
20.	"Lovin' Me Too Long"	Hayslip; Murphy; Jacob Rice	3:14
Total length:			67:28

== Personnel ==
Credits adapted from Tidal.

=== Musicians ===
- Jason Aldean – lead vocals (all tracks), backing vocals (track 18)
- Danny Rader – acoustic guitar (1–5, 7–15, 17–20), additional guitar (4, 5, 10, 20), banjo (6), bouzouki (8, 16)
- Tully Kennedy – bass (all tracks), programming (2–8, 10, 12–14, 16, 17, 19)
- Kurt Allison – electric guitar (all tracks), programming (2–8, 10, 12–14, 16, 17, 19)
- Adam Shoenfeld – electric guitar (all tracks), acoustic guitar (18)
- Perry Coleman – backing vocals
- Rich Redmond – drums
- Michael Knox – programming
- Tony Harrell – electric piano (1, 18), Hammond B3 organ (2–10, 12–14, 16, 17, 19, 20), synthesizer (11, 15)
- Blake Bollinger – programming (1–17, 19, 20)
- Mike Johnson – pedal steel guitar (1–6, 9, 10, 13, 15, 17), lap steel guitar (8)
- Luke Bryan – lead vocals (5), backing vocals (5)
- Russ Pahl – pedal steel guitar (7, 11, 12, 16, 18–20)
- Lydia Vaughan – backing vocals (7)
- David Lee Murphy – lead vocals (9), acoustic guitar (9)
- Brittany Aldean – lead vocals (11), backing vocals (11, 15)
- Mickey Jack Cones – programming (18)

=== Technical ===
- Michael Knox – production
- Brandon Epps – engineering, editing (all tracks); additional vocal engineering (1–6, 8, 10–20)
- Peter Coleman – engineering
- Mickey Jack Cones – engineering (1–3, 6–9, 11–20), vocal engineering (4, 10), additional vocal engineering (1–3, 5, 6, 8, 9, 11–20)
- Jeff Braun – mixing
- Adam Ayan – mastering

== Charts ==
Chart performance for Songs About Us
Chart (2026)	Peak position
Australian Albums (ARIA)	57
Scottish Albums (Official Charts)	77
Swiss Albums (Schweizer Hitparade)	51
UK Albums Sales (OCC)	68
UK Country Albums (Official Charts)	7
UK Independent Albums (Official Charts)	20
US Billboard 200	24
US Independent Albums (Billboard)	2
US Top Country Albums (Billboard)	6
