= Don't Tell on Me =

2026 song by Jason Aldean

Single by Jason Aldean

from the album Songs About Us
- Released: March 2, 2026
- Studio: Treasure Isle (Berry Hill)
- Genre: Country rock
- Length: 3:04
- Label: BBR; Macon
- Songwriters: Kurt Allison; Tully Kennedy; John Morgan; Lydia Vaughan
- Producer: Michael Knox

Jason Aldean singles chronology
| "How Far Does a Goodbye Go" (2025) | "Don't Tell on Me" (2026) | "Anytime Soon" (2026) |

Lyric video
- "Don't Tell on Me" on YouTube

"Don't Tell on Me" is a song by American country music singer Jason Aldean, released on March 2, 2026, as the second single from his twelfth studio album, Songs About Us. The song was co-written by Kurt Allison, Tully Kennedy, John Morgan, and Lydia Vaughan, and produced by Michael Knox.

The song followed 2025's "How Far Does a Goodbye Go", which was Aldean's 31st number one song on the Billboard Country Airplay chart. It is also his 50th release to country radio.

== Background ==
The song follows the narrator as he speaks to his own heart, asking it to keep his love for his ex-partner private. When talking about the song, Aldean stated that it was "one of my favorite songs" on his upcoming album, Songs About Us.

The song was described as a "return to [Aldean's] past", leaning towards a more rock-oriented sound similar to the Foo Fighters, reminiscent of when he used AC/DC-inspired chords for 2008's "She's Country". Lydia Vaughan, one of the song's co-writers, was credited with the Foo Fighters influences for the guitars, but also the "pensive, restrained" verses that used "3 Doors Down-like [melodies] to introduce the singer's efforts at keeping his pain a secret".

Aldean surprise released the song and two other tracks on digital platforms on February 27, 2026, alongside the announcement of his Songs About Us Tour.

== Commercial performance and critical reception ==
In the song's first week, it was the most-added single of the week with 131 station adds, which was the best impact week for any country release of 2026 as of its impact date. The song debuted at 21 on the Billboard Country Airplay chart for the chart dated March 14. "Don't Tell on Me" became Aldean's 32nd chart-topping song on Billboard Country Airplay for the week dated July 11 and entered its third-consecutive week atop the chart for the week dated July 25.

Melinda Newman and Jessica Nicholson ranked the song as the sixth-best song on the album.

== Track listing ==
Digital single

1. "Don't Tell on Me" – 3:04
2. "Drinking About You" – 3:02
3. "Dust on the Bottle" (with David Lee Murphy) – 3:48

== Personnel ==
Credits adapted from Tidal.

=== Musicians ===
- Jason Aldean – lead vocals
- Danny Rader – acoustic guitar
- Tully Kennedy – bass, programming
- Kurt Allison – electric guitar, programming
- Adam Shoenfeld – electric guitar
- Perry Coleman – backing vocals
- Rich Redmond – drums
- Michael Knox – programming
- Tony Harrell – Hammond B3 organ
- Blake Bollinger – programming
- Mike Johnson – pedal steel guitar

=== Technical ===
- Michael Knox – production
- Brandon Epps – engineering, editing, additional vocal engineering
- Peter Coleman – engineering
- Mickey Jack Cones – engineering, additional vocal engineering
- Jeff Braun – mixing
- Adam Ayan – mastering

== Charts ==
Weekly chart performance for "Don't Tell on Me"
| Chart (2026) | Peak position |
|---|---|
| Canada Hot 100 (Billboard) | 58 |
| Canada Country (Billboard) | 1 |
| US Billboard Hot 100 | 34 |
| US Country Airplay (Billboard) | 1 |
| US Hot Country Songs (Billboard) | 9 |

== Release history ==
Release dates and formats for "Don't Tell on Me"
| Region | Date | Format(s) | Label(s) | Ref. |
|---|---|---|---|---|
| Various | February 27, 2026 | Digital streaming | BBR; Macon | |
| United States | March 2, 2026 | Country radio | BBR; Macon | |
