= Time of My Life =

Time of My Life or The Time of My Life may refer to:

== Music ==
=== Albums ===
- Time of My Life (3 Doors Down album), 2011
- Time of My Life (Nathan Carter album), 2011
- Time of My Life (George Fox album), 1995
- Time of My Life (Ronan Keating album), 2016

=== Songs ===
- "Time of My Life" (George Fox song), 1995
- "The Time of My Life" (David Cook song), a 2008 song by David Cook
- "(I've Had) The Time of My Life", a 1987 song by Bill Medley and Jennifer Warnes, used as the theme song for the film Dirty Dancing
- "The Time of My Life" (Benson Boone song), a 2026 song by Benson Boone
- "Time of My Life", a 2016 song by The Afters from the album Live On Forever
- "Time of My Life", a 2010 song by Patrick Wolf from the album Lupercalia
- "Time of My Life", a 2020 song by The Rubens

== Others ==
- Time of My Life (play), a 1992 play by Alan Ayckbourn
- Time of My Life (Philippine TV series), a 2011 Philippine drama
- Time of My Life (Australian TV series), a 2013 Australian documentary series
- Time of My Life (film), a 2012 Belgian film
- "The Time of My Life" (Johnny Bravo), a 2004 episode of Johnny Bravo
- The Time (Dirty Bit), a 2010 song by Black Eyed Peas from the album The Beginning (Black Eyed Peas album)

== See also ==
- Time of Your Life (disambiguation)
- Time of Our Lives (disambiguation)
