= Out with a Bang =

Out with a Bang may refer to:

- Out with a Bang (album), a 1994 album by David Lee Murphy
- "Out with a Bang" (David Lee Murphy song), a 1995 single by David Lee Murphy
- "Out with a Bang" (Self song), a 2017 song by Self from their album Ornament & Crime
- "Out with a Bang" (Entourage), an episode of the TV series Entourage
- "Out with a Bang" (Chicago Fire), an episode of the TV series Chicago Fire
