= Way Out Here =

Studio album by Josh Thompson
- Released: February 23, 2010
- Genre: Country
- Length: 35:44
- Label: Columbia Nashville
- Producer: Michael Knox

Josh Thompson chronology
Way Out Here (2010)	Turn It Up (2014)

Singles from Way Out Here
- 1. "Beer on the Table" Released: July 27, 2009; 2. "Way Out Here" Released: March 29, 2010; 3. "Won't Be Lonely Long" Released: November 22, 2010

Professional ratings
Review scores
Source	Rating
Allmusic	3/5 stars
Country Weekly	3.5/5 stars
Roughstock	favorable

Way Out Here is the debut studio album by American country music singer Josh Thompson. It was released on February 23, 2010 via Columbia Records Nashville. The album's first two singles, "Beer on the Table" and the title track, charted in the Top 20 on the US Billboard Hot Country Songs chart, peaking at number 17 and number 15, respectively. "Won't Be Lonely Long", the third single, peaked at number 25 on the same chart.

== Critical reception ==
Jessica Phillips of Country Weekly magazine gave the album three-and-a-half stars out of five, saying that Thompson "confidently celebrates the particulars of country living." Bobby Peacock of Roughstock gave a positive review, praising Thompson's voice and songwriting, saying that the album "offer[s] a crystal-clear image of who he is both musically and personally." Stephen Thomas Erlewine of Allmusic rated it three stars out of five, saying that Thompson "seems a little too clean to be rowdy" but that "the singles are the kind that gain strength with repetition."

== Track listing ==
All tracks are written by Josh Thompson, with additional co-writers as noted.

No.	Title	Writer(s)	Length
1.	"Beer on the Table"	Ken Johnson; Andi Zack	3:10
2.	"Blame It on Waylon"	Rhett Akins	3:33
3.	"Sinner"		3:56
4.	"Won't Be Lonely Long"	George Ducas; Arlis Albritton	3:44
5.	"Always Been Me"	Jay Brunswick; C.J. Wilder	3:38
6.	"A Name in This Town"	David Lee Murphy; Casey Beathard	3:49
7.	"Way Out Here"	Murphy; Beathard	4:06
8.	"You Ain't Seen Country Yet"	Brunswick	3:18
9.	"Back Around"	Albritton	3:10
10.	"I Won't Go Crazy"	Dallas Davidson	3:23

== Personnel ==
Adapted from liner notes.

- Glen Duncan - fiddle
- Tony Harrell - Hammond B-3 organ, piano
- Wes Hightower - background vocals
- Mike Johnson - steel guitar
- Greg Morrow - drums
- David Lee Murphy - background vocals
- Alison Prestwood - bass guitar
- Danny Rader - acoustic guitar, banjo
- Rich Redmond - percussion
- Dave Ristrim - steel guitar
- Adam Shoenfeld - acoustic guitar, electric guitar
- Josh Thompson - lead vocals
- Lisa Torres - background vocals

== Chart performance ==
The album debuted at No. 28 on the Billboard 200 and No. 9 on the Top Country Albums chart, with 15,000 copies sold in the US.

=== Album ===
Chart (2010)	Peak position
U.S. Billboard Top Country Albums	9
U.S. Billboard 200	28

=== Year-end charts ===
Chart (2010)	Position
US Billboard Top Country Albums	59

=== Singles ===
Year	Single	Peak chart positions	
Year	Single	US Country	US
2009	"Beer on the Table"	17	103
2010	"Way Out Here"	15	85
2010	"Won't Be Lonely Long"	25	—
"—" denotes releases that did not chart
