= Anytime Soon (song) =

2026 song by Jason Aldean

Single by Jason Aldean

from the album Songs About Us
- Released: August 3, 2026
- Genre: Country
- Length: 3:36 (single version); 4:33 (album version)
- Label: BBR; Macon
- Songwriters: Kurt Allison; John Edwards; Tully Kennedy; John Morgan
- Producer: Michael Knox

Jason Aldean singles chronology
"Don't Tell on Me" (2026)	"Anytime Soon" (2026)

Music video
- "Anytime Soon" on YouTube

"Anytime Soon" is a song by American country music singer Jason Aldean. It was released on August 3, 2026, as the third single from his twelfth studio album, Songs About Us. The song was co-written by Kurt Allison, John Edwards, Tully Kennedy, and John Morgan, and produced by Michael Knox.

The song followed "How Far Does a Goodbye Go" and "Don't Tell on Me, Aldean's 31st and 32nd number one songs on the Billboard Country Airplay chart, respectively.

== Background ==
Aldean played the song live for the first time in January 2026.

"Anytime Soon" is a nod to Ronnie Milsap due to the unique opening of organs, which Aldean described as a fresh way to open his new album.

== Critical reception ==
Melinda Newman and Jessica Nicholson of Billboard ranked the song as the fourth-best song on Songs About Us. Newman described the song as a "slow-burner" that "instantly reels in the listener". Max Buondonno of Country Central, in a review of the album, called the track "nostalgic".

== Personnel ==
Credits adapted from Tidal.

=== Musicians ===
- Jason Aldean – lead vocals
- Michael Knox – programming
- Perry Coleman – backing vocals
- Rich Redmond – drums
- Tully Kennedy – bass
- Kurt Allison – electric guitar
- Adam Shoenfeld – electric guitar
- Danny Rader – acoustic guitar
- Tony Harrell – Wurlitzer piano
- Mike Johnson – pedal steel guitar
- Blake Bollinger – programming

=== Technical ===
- Michael Knox – production
- Peter Coleman – recording
- Brandon Epps – editing, assistant engineering, vocal recording
- Mickey Jack Cones – vocal recording
- Jeff Braun – mixing
- Adam Ayan – mastering

== Charts ==
Weekly chart performance for "Anytime Soon"
Chart (2026)	Peak position
Canada Country (Billboard)	33
US Billboard Hot 100	91
US Country Airplay (Billboard)	11
US Hot Country Songs (Billboard)	29

== Release history ==
Release dates and formats for "Anytime Soon"
Region	Date	Format(s)	Label(s)	Ref.
Various	July 10, 2026	Digital streaming	BBR; Macon	
United States	August 3, 2026	Country radio	BBR; Macon	
