= With All My Might =

With All My Might may refer to:

- With All My Might (album), a 1989 album by George Fox
- With All My Might (George Fox song)
- With All My Might (Sparks song)
