= Coming Around =

Coming Around may refer to:

- "Coming Around" (Travis song)
- "The Other One" (song), a Grateful Dead song which uses the phase repeatedly in its chorus
- Comin' Around, a country song by Josh Thompson
