= Do the Math (disambiguation) =

Do the Math may refer to:

- "Do the Math", song by George Fox from Survivor (1998)
- "Do the Math" (Dove Cameron song), from Final Girl (2026)
- Do the Math (2013), film of 350.org featuring Bill McKibben
- Do the Math, a pricing game
- Do the Math, an advertising slogan for the Atari Jaguar
