= Cosmic Hallelujah =

Studio album by Kenny Chesney
- Released: October 28, 2016
- Recorded: 2016
- Studios: Avatar (New York, New York); Blackbird (Nashville, Tennessee); County Q (Nashville, Tennessee); Curb Studio B (Nashville, Tennessee); Earthstar Creation Center (Venice, California); House of Blues Studio (Nashville, Tennessee); OmniSound (Nashville, Tennessee); Shangri-La (Malibu, California); Sound Stage (Nashville, Tennessee); South Street (Nashville, Tennessee); Tracking Room (Nashville, Tennessee)
- Length: 43:20
- Labels: Blue Chair; Columbia Nashville
- Producers: Buddy Cannon; Kenny Chesney

Kenny Chesney chronology
The Big Revival (2014)	Cosmic Hallelujah (2016)	Songs for the Saints (2018)

Singles from Cosmic Hallelujah
- 1. "Noise" Released: March 24, 2016; 2. "Setting the World on Fire" Released: July 28, 2016; 3. "Bar at the End of the World" Released: January 2, 2017; 4. "All the Pretty Girls" Released: June 5, 2017

Cosmic Hallelujah is the seventeenth studio album by American country music artist Kenny Chesney. It was released on October 28, 2016, by Blue Chair and Columbia Nashville. The album was originally scheduled for release July 8, 2016, under the title Some Town Somewhere.

The song "Jesus and Elvis" also appears on songwriter Hayes Carll's 2019 album What It Is. Additionally, "Winnebago" was later recorded by its writer David Lee Murphy on his 2018 album No Zip Code.

== Critical reception ==
Professional ratings
Review scores
Source	Rating
AllMusic	4.5/5 stars
The Boston Globe	positive

Cosmic Hallelujah has generally received positive reviews from critics.

Stephen Thomas Erlewine of AllMusic gave the album a very positive review, saying that "Chesney is determined to connect with his times without abandoning himself, and the result is one of his best records."

Maura Johnston of The Boston Globe also gave the album a positive review, saying that "Chesney isn’t one to rest on his laurels, and his 17th album, Cosmic Hallelujah, bears that out."

=== Accolades ===
Year	Association	Category	Result
2018	Grammy Awards	Best Country Album	Nominated

== Commercial performance ==
Cosmic Hallelujah debuted at number two on the US Billboard 200 chart with 89,000 units, with 79,000 of that figure being pure album sales. It was the best-selling album of the week in terms of physical sales and downloads. The album also debuted at number one on the Top Country Albums chart. As of December 2017, the album has sold 239,500 copies in the United States.

== Track listing ==
No.	Title	Writer(s)	Length
1.	"Trip Around the Sun"	Nick Brophy; Brett James; Hillary Lindsey	2:55
2.	"All the Pretty Girls"	Nicolle Galyon; Tommy Lee James; Josh Osborne	3:32
3.	"Setting the World on Fire" (featuring Pink)	Ross Copperman; Matt Jenkins; Osborne	3:38
4.	"Noise"	Kenny Chesney; Shane McAnally; Jon Nite; Copperman	3:25
5.	"Bucket"	B. James; Craig Wiseman	3:15
6.	"Bar at the End of the World"	J. T. Harding; Aimee Mayo; David Lee Murphy	3:28
7.	"Some Town Somewhere"	Heather Morgan; Copperman; Osborne	2:51
8.	"Rich and Miserable"	Jesse Frasure; McAnally; Osborne	3:23
9.	"Jesus and Elvis"	Matraca Berg; Hayes Carll; Allison Moorer	4:08
10.	"Winnebago"	Murphy	2:59
11.	"Coach"	Chesney; Casey Beathard	4:45
12.	"I Want to Know What Love Is" (hidden track)	Mick Jones	5:01
Total length:			43:20

== Personnel ==
- Wyatt Beard – background vocals
- Kenny Chesney – lead vocals
- Ross Copperman – background vocals
- Chad Cromwell – drums
- Kenny Greenberg – acoustic guitar, electric guitar
- Jesse Frasure – background vocals
- David Huff – percussion, programming
- Brett James – background vocals
- Shane McAnally – background vocals
- Rob McNelley – electric guitar
- Allison Moorer – background vocals on "Jesus and Elvis"
- Heather Morgan – background vocals
- Greg Morrow – drums, cowbell
- David Lee Murphy – background vocals
- Josh Osborne – background vocals
- Pink – duet vocals on "Setting the World on Fire"
- Danny Rader – banjo, bouzouki, acoustic guitar, tres
- Michael Rhodes – bass guitar
- Mike Rojas – accordion, keyboards, Hammond organ, piano, synthesizer, Wurlitzer
- F. Reid Shippen – programming, Wurlitzer
- Jimmie Lee Sloas – bass guitar
- Caitlyn Smith – backing vocals on "All the Pretty Girls"
- Derek Wells – acoustic guitar, electric guitar

== Charts ==
=== Weekly charts ===
Chart (2016)	Peak position
Australian Albums (ARIA)	19
Australian Country Albums (ARIA)	2
Canadian Albums (Billboard)	12
New Zealand Heatseekers Albums (RMNZ)	3
US Billboard 200	2
US Top Country Albums (Billboard)	1

=== Year-end charts ===
Chart (2016)	Position
US Top Country Albums (Billboard)	24
Chart (2017)	Position
US Top Country Albums (Billboard)	30

=== Singles ===
Year	Single	Peak chart positions						Certifications (sales threshold)
Year	Single	US Country	US Country Airplay	US	CAN Country	CAN	CAN AC	Certifications (sales threshold)
2016	"Noise"	14	6	72	5	98	—	RIAA: Gold; MC: Gold
2016	"Setting the World on Fire"	1	1	29	1	48	31	RIAA: 2× Platinum; ARIA: Gold; MC: Platinum
2017	"Bar at the End of the World"	17	10	92	2	—	—	RIAA: Gold
2017	"All the Pretty Girls"	7	1	63	2	—	—	RIAA: 2× Platinum

== Certifications ==
Certifications for Cosmic Hallelujah
Region	Certification	Certified units/sales
United States (RIAA)	Gold	500,000^{‡}
^{‡} Sales+streaming figures based on certification alone.
