= The Spice of Life =

The Spice of Life may refer to:

== Albums ==
- Spice of Life (George Fox album)
- Spice of Life, album by D'Sound
- The Spice of Life (Kazumi Watanabe album)
- The Spice of Life (Marlena Shaw album)
- The Spice of Life (Earl Klugh album)

== Songs ==
- "Spice of Life", hit single by Manhattan Transfer from Bodies and Souls, 1983
- "Spice of Life", by George Fox from Spice of Life
- "The Spice of Life", by Everything but the Girl from Eden

== Other uses ==
- The Spice of Life (film), 1948 French film directed by Jean Dréville
- The Spice of Life, London, pub at Cambridge Circus in Charing Cross Road
