= I Give You My Word (song) =

Single by George Fox

from the album Greatest Hits 1987–1997
- Released: 1997
- Genre: Country
- Length: 3:59
- Label: WEA
- Songwriters: Kim Tribble; George Fox
- Producer: Kim Tribble

George Fox singles chronology
"Time of My Life" (1995)	"I Give You My Word" (1997)	"The Night the Barn Burned Down" (1997)

"I Give You My Word" is a song recorded by Canadian country music artist George Fox. Released in 1997 as the first single from his first greatest hits album, Greatest Hits 1987–1997, it peaked at number 7 on the RPM Country Tracks chart in June 1997.

== Chart performance ==
Chart (1997)	Peak position
Canada Country Singles (RPM)	7

=== Year-end charts ===
Chart (1997)	Position
Canada Country Tracks (RPM)	9
