= Setting the World on Fire =

Single by Kenny Chesney featuring Pink

from the album Cosmic Hallelujah
- Released: July 28, 2016
- Recorded: 2016
- Studio: Shangri-La (Malibu, California)
- Genre: Country pop; country rock
- Length: 3:37 (album version); 3:32 (single edit)
- Label: Blue Chair; Columbia Nashville
- Songwriters: Ross Copperman; Matt Jenkins; Josh Osborne
- Producers: Buddy Cannon; Kenny Chesney

Kenny Chesney singles chronology
"Noise" (2016)	"Setting the World on Fire" (2016)	"Bar at the End of the World" (2017)

Pink singles chronology
"Just Like Fire" (2016)	"Setting the World on Fire" (2016)	"Waterfall" (2017)

Music video
- "Setting the World on Fire" on YouTube

"Setting the World on Fire" is a song written by Ross Copperman, Matt Jenkins, and Josh Osborne and recorded by American country music artist Kenny Chesney as a duet with American singer Pink. It was released to country radio on July 28, 2016 and to digital retailers the following day as the second single from Chesney's 2016 album Cosmic Hallelujah. The song was also promoted to adult and pop radio on September 12, 2016. The song was nominated for the Best Country Duo/Group Performance at the 2017 Grammy Awards.

== Commercial performance ==
"Setting the World on Fire" debuted at number 26 on the Australian Singles Chart, becoming Chesney's first ever song to chart in Australia.

In Canada, the song debuted at number 47 on the Canada Country chart and has reached number one and debuted at number 67 on the Canadian Hot 100 and peaked at number 48.

In the United States, the song sold 93,000 copies during its first week, marking Chesney's biggest sales week for a single, surpassing the previous best sales week of his 2012 hit "Feel Like a Rock Star". It was the second best-selling song for the week of August 20, 2016. It concurrently debuted at number 29 on the US Billboard Hot 100, becoming Chesney's twenty-fifth top 40 hit on the all-genre chart. It also rose from number 43 to number two on Hot Country Songs chart, eventually peaking at number one. On the Country Airplay chart, it debuted at number 22 and has reached number one. "Setting the World on Fire" debuted at number 35 on the Adult Pop Songs chart for the week of October 8, 2016 and is Chesney's first entry on the chart.

As of January 2017, it has sold 624,000 copies in the United States.

The album was nominated for Top Country Song at the 2017 Billboard Music Awards, and won Top Country Collaboration at event.

== Music video ==
The music video was directed by P. R. Brown, and premiered in September 2016. Neither Chesney nor Pink are featured in the music video, except for various posters and billboards displaying the collaboration. The music video is in black and white, and tells the story of two young lovers who move to Los Angeles and have a romantic encounter, as described in the song's lyrics. It was filmed around Los Angeles and Riverside, California over two days in August 2016.

== Personnel ==
- Kenny Chesney – lead vocals
- Chad Cromwell – drums
- Kenny Greenberg – electric guitar
- David Huff – programming
- Pink – duet vocals
- Danny Rader – acoustic guitar
- Mike Rojas – synthesizer
- F. Reid Shippen – programming
- Jimmie Lee Sloas – bass guitar
- Derek Wells – electric guitar

== Charts ==
=== Weekly charts ===
Chart (2016–2017)	Peak position
Australia (ARIA)	26
Canada Hot 100 (Billboard)	48
Canada AC (Billboard)	31
Canada Country (Billboard)	1
Canada Hot AC (Billboard)	45
US Billboard Hot 100	29
US Adult Pop Airplay (Billboard)	19
US Country Airplay (Billboard)	1
US Hot Country Songs (Billboard)	1

=== Year end charts ===
Chart (2016)	Position
US Country Airplay (Billboard)	28
US Hot Country Songs (Billboard)	20

Chart (2017)	Position
US Hot Country Songs (Billboard)	75

=== Decade-end charts ===
Chart (2010–2019)	Position
US Hot Country Songs (Billboard)	35

== Certifications ==
Region	Certification	Certified units/sales
Australia (ARIA)	Gold	35,000^{‡}
Canada (Music Canada)	Platinum	80,000^{‡}
New Zealand (RMNZ)	Gold	15,000^{‡}
United States (RIAA)	2× Platinum	2,000,000^{‡}
^{‡} Sales+streaming figures based on certification alone.

== Release history ==
Country	Date	Format	Label	Ref.
United States	July 28, 2016	Country radio	Blue Chair; Columbia Nashville	
Worldwide	July 29, 2016	Digital download	Blue Chair; Columbia Nashville	
United States	September 12, 2016	Contemporary hit radio; hot adult contemporary	Blue Chair; Columbia Nashville	
