= Survivor (George Fox album) =

Studio album by George Fox
- Released: May 19, 1998
- Genre: Country
- Length: 38:36
- Label: Warner Music Canada
- Producer: Kim Tribble

George Fox chronology
Greatest Hits 1987–1997 (1997)	Survivor (1998)	George Fox Christmas (1999)

Survivor is the sixth studio album by Canadian country music artist George Fox. It was released by Warner Music Canada on May 19, 1998. The album includes the Top 10 single "I'm Gone."

== Track listing ==
1. "I'm Gone" (Marv Green, Rick Orozco) – 3:07
2. "Goodbye" (George Fox, Kim Tribble) – 4:16
3. "How Do I Get There from Her" (Fox, Tribble) – 4:18
4. "Do the Math" (Fox, Tribble) – 2:53
5. "Don't Listen to Your Heart" (Jeff Crossan) – 3:28
6. "Survivor" (Fox, Tribble) – 3:28
7. "Brand New Star" (Fox, Tribble) – 3:21
8. "Way Out in the Country" (Fox, Cyril Rawson, Tribble) – 2:47
9. "Broken Heart String" (Fox, Rawson, Tribble) – 3:54
10. "The Greenest Grass" (Keith Urban, Vernon Rust) – 3:43
11. "If Seeing Is Believing" (Fox, John Prestia, Tribble) – 3:21
