= I'm Gone (George Fox song) =

Single by George Fox

from the album Survivor
- Released: 1998
- Genre: Country
- Length: 3:07
- Label: WEA
- Songwriters: Marv Green; Rick Orozco
- Producer: Kim Tribble

George Fox singles chronology
"The Night the Barn Burned Down" (1997)	"I'm Gone" (1998)	"Do the Math" (1998)

"I'm Gone" is a song recorded by Canadian country music artist George Fox. It was released in 1998 as the first single from his sixth studio album, Survivor. It peaked at number 6 on the RPM Country Tracks chart in June 1998.

== Chart performance ==
Chart (1998)	Peak position
Canada Country Singles (RPM)	6

=== Year-end charts ===
Chart (1998)	Position
Canada Country Tracks (RPM)	43
