= Bachelor Girl (disambiguation) =

Bachelor Girl are an Australian pop duo.

(The) Bachelor Girl may also refer to:

- Bachelor Girl (song), a 1996 song by George Fox
- Bachelor Girl (film), a 1988 Australian TV film
- The Bachelor Girl (novel), a 1922 novel by Victor Margueritte
- The Bachelor Girl (film), a 1929 American sound part-talkie comedy drama film

== See also ==
- Bachelor Girls, a 2016 English-language Indian documentary
- Bachelor Boy, a song by Cliff Richard and the Shadows
