= Turn It Up (Josh Thompson album) =

Studio album by Josh Thompson
- Released: April 1, 2014
- Genre: Country
- Length: 31:21
- Label: Show Dog-Universal Music
- Producer: Mark Wright; Cliff Audretch III

Josh Thompson chronology
Way Out Here (2010)	Turn It Up (2014)	Change: The Lost Record, Vol. 1 (2015)

Singles from Turn It Up
- 1. "Cold Beer with Your Name on It" Released: August 12, 2013; 2. "Wanted Me Gone" Released: April 28, 2014

Professional ratings
Review scores
Source	Rating
AllMusic	3/5 stars

Turn It Up is the second studio album by American country music artist Josh Thompson. It was released on April 1, 2014, via Show Dog-Universal Music.

The album includes the single "Cold Beer with Your Name on It".

== Track listing ==
No.	Title	Writer(s)	Length
1.	"Down for a Get Down"	Cliff Audretch III, Kendell Marvel, Josh Thompson	2:31
2.	"Turn It Up"	Casey Beathard, Marvel, Thompson	3:15
3.	"Cold Beer with Your Name on It"	Brent Anderson, Clint Daniels	3:21
4.	"Wanted Me Gone"	Thompson, Brad Warren, Brett Warren	3:11
5.	"Hillbilly Limo"	Jaren Johnston, Thompson	2:47
6.	"A Little Memory"	Marvel, John Ozier, Thompson	3:06
7.	"Drink Drink Drink"	Wes Hightower, Phil O'Donnell, Thompson	2:58
8.	"Left This Town"	Jeff Middleton, Thompson	3:12
9.	"Firebird"	Brent Cobb, Brandon Kinney, Thompson	3:11
10.	"Hank Crankin' People"	Marvel, Justin Moore, O'Donnell, Thompson	3:50
Total length:			31:21

== Personnel ==
Adapted from liner notes.

- Richard Bennett - acoustic guitar (tracks 2, 3, 7)
- Perry Coleman - background vocals (track 2)
- Shannon Forrest - drums (all tracks), drum programming (track 1)
- Paul Franklin - steel guitar (track 3)
- Tania Hancheroff - background vocals (track 2)
- Wes Hightower - background vocals (all tracks except 2)
- Steve Hinson - steel guitar (tracks 8, 9)
- Justin Levenson - percussion (tracks 8, 9)
- Mac McAnally - acoustic guitar (tracks 1, 8, 9), mandola (track 8)
- Rob McNelley - electric guitar (all tracks)
- Russ Pahl - steel guitar (track 6)
- Michael Rhodes - bass guitar (tracks 4–6, 10)
- Jimmie Lee Sloas - bass guitar (tracks 1, 8, 9)
- Bobby Terry - acoustic guitar (tracks 4–6, 10)
- Josh Thompson - lead vocals (all tracks)
- Jimmy Wallace - clavinet (track 2), Hammond B-3 organ (tracks 1–3, 7, 8), keyboards (tracks 4–6, 10), piano (tracks 3, 8), Wurlitzer (tracks 3, 9)
- Glenn Worf - bass guitar (tracks 2, 3, 7)

== Chart performance ==
The album debuted at No. 36 on the Billboard 200 and No. 7 on the Top Country Albums chart, with 9,000 copies sold in its first week in the US. The album has sold 25,000 copies in the US as of July 2014.

=== Album ===
Chart (2014)	Peak position
US Billboard 200	36
US Top Country Albums (Billboard)	7

=== Singles ===
Year	Single	Peak chart positions		
Year	Single	US Country	US Country Airplay	CAN
2013	"Cold Beer with Your Name on It"	32	27	88
2014	"Wanted Me Gone"	—	44	—
"—" denotes releases that did not chart
