= Cold Beer with Your Name on It =

Single by Josh Thompson

from the album Turn It Up
- Released: August 12, 2013
- Genre: Country
- Length: 3:21
- Label: Show Dog-Universal Music
- Songwriter(s): Brent Anderson; Clint Daniels
- Producer(s): Mark Wright; Cliff Audretch, III

Josh Thompson singles chronology
"Comin' Around" (2011)	"Cold Beer with Your Name on It" (2013)	"Wanted Me Gone" (2014)

"Cold Beer with Your Name on It" is a song written by Brent Anderson and Clint Daniels, and recorded by American country music artist Josh Thompson. It was released on August 12, 2013. It is the first single from his second studio album Turn It Up, and is the only song from the album that Thompson did not write or co-write.

== Critical reception ==
Billy Dukes of Taste of Country gave the song three and a half stars out of five, calling it "vivid, but familiar." Dukes wrote that it "isn’t as unique as some songs on the radio or from his catalog" but felt that it "stays true to his brand while opening the door for a few more to join the party."

== Music video ==
The music video was directed by Chris Hicky and premiered in March 2014.

== Chart performance ==
"Cold Beer with Your Name on It" debuted at number 52 on the U.S. Billboard Country Airplay chart for the week of August 31, 2013, and at number 50 on the U.S. Billboard Hot Country Songs chart for the week of August 10, 2013. It also debuted at number 88 on the Canadian Hot 100 chart for the week of August 10, 2013, becoming his first chart entry there.

Chart (2013–2014)	Peak position
Canada (Canadian Hot 100)	88
US Country Airplay (Billboard)	27
US Hot Country Songs (Billboard)	32

=== Year-end charts ===
Chart (2014)	Position
US Country Airplay (Billboard)	96
