= With All My Might (album) =

Studio album by George Fox
- Released: 1989
- Genre: Country
- Length: 42:08
- Label: Warner Music Canada
- Producers: Brian Ahern; Gregg Brown; Dan Lowe; Jerry Martin

George Fox chronology
George Fox (1988)	With All My Might (1989)	Spice of Life (1991)

Alternative cover
- Cover for U.S. re-release

With All My Might is the second studio album by Canadian country music artist George Fox. It was released by Warner Music Canada in 1989. The album peaked at number 84 on the RPM Top Albums chart and was certified gold by the CRIA.

Warner Bros. Records released the album in the United States in 1990 with a different track list and new artwork. The U.S. version included three songs previously included on Fox's debut album, "Angelina", "Hey Johnny", and "Lonesome Avenue Goodbye (Goldmine)".

== Track listing ==
All songs written by George Fox except where noted.

No.	Title	Writer(s)	Length
1.	"No Trespassing"		3:51
2.	"This House (Is Haunted)"		4:06
3.	"Bachelor Girl"		2:56
4.	"I Threw It All Away"	Bob Dylan	3:09
5.	"Lime Rickey"		2:46
6.	"Comin' Around"		4:12
7.	"With All My Might"		4:32
8.	"Lonely Tears"	Charlie Black, Rory Michael Bourke, Fox	3:01
9.	"Mr. President"		3:20
10.	"Long Gone Lonesome Blues"		2:43

U.S. version
No.	Title	Writer(s)	Length
1.	"Angelina"		3:25
2.	"This House (Is Haunted)"		4:06
3.	"Lonesome Avenue Goodbye (Goldmine)"		3:35
4.	"No Trespassing"		3:51
5.	"I Threw It All Away"	Dylan	3:09
6.	"Hey Johnny"		3:15
7.	"Comin' Around"		4:12
8.	"With All My Might"		4:32
9.	"Mr. President"		3:20
10.	"Bachelor Girl"		2:56
11.	"Lonely Tears"	Black, Bourke, Fox	3:01
12.	"Lime Rickey"		2:46

== Charts ==
Chart (1989)	Peak position
Canada Top Albums/CDs (RPM)	84

== Certifications ==
Region	Certification	Certified units/sales
Canada (Music Canada)	Gold	50,000^{^}
^{^} Shipments figures based on certification alone.
