= Bar at the End of the World =

Single by Kenny Chesney

from the album Cosmic Hallelujah
- Released: January 2, 2017
- Recorded: 2016
- Length: 3:28
- Label: Blue Chair; Columbia Nashville
- Songwriter(s): J. T. Harding; Aimee Mayo; David Lee Murphy
- Producer(s): Buddy Cannon; Kenny Chesney

Kenny Chesney singles chronology
"Setting the World on Fire" (2016)	"Bar at the End of the World" (2017)	"All the Pretty Girls" (2017)

"Bar at the End of the World" is a song written by J. T. Harding, Aimee Mayo, and David Lee Murphy and recorded by American country music artist Kenny Chesney, released on 2 January 2017 as the third single from Chesney's album Cosmic Hallelujah (2016).

== Content ==
The song is a mid-tempo recalling a bar. Co-writer J. T. Harding told Nash Country Daily that the song was inspired by "these bars there that you can only get to by boat" that he saw while visiting a friend in the Virgin Islands. He said that he did not have a title for the song until he saw a sign reading "Tavern at the End of the World" in Boston. Harding presented the idea to David Lee Murphy at a songwriting session, and Murphy provided the opening lines.

== Charts ==
=== Weekly charts ===
Chart (2017)	Peak position
Canada Country (Billboard)	2
US Billboard Hot 100	92
US Country Airplay (Billboard)	10
US Hot Country Songs (Billboard)	17

=== Year-end charts ===
Chart (2017)	Position
Canada Country (Billboard)	43
US Country Airplay (Billboard)	56
US Hot Country Songs (Billboard)	64

== Certifications ==
Region	Certification	Certified units/sales
United States (RIAA)	Gold	500,000^{‡}
^{‡} Sales+streaming figures based on certification alone.
