= George Fox (album) =

Studio album by George Fox
- Released: 1988
- Genre: Country
- Length: 37:09
- Label: Warner Music Canada

George Fox chronology
George Fox (1988)	With All My Might (1989)

George Fox is the debut album by Canadian country music artist George Fox. It was released by Warner Music Canada in 1988. The album peaked at number 16 on the RPM Country Albums chart and was certified gold by the CRIA.

== Track listing ==
1. "Angelina" – 3:25
2. "RBJ" – 4:13
3. "Goldmine" – 3:58
4. "State Side" – 3:22
5. "Lovesick Blues" – 2:53
6. "Hey Johnny" – 3:52
7. "I've Been Everywhere" – 3:51
8. "Long Distance" – 3:48
9. "Heartwreck" – 3:44
10. "Life of the Party" – 4:03

== Charts ==
Chart (1989)	Peak position
Canadian Country Albums (RPM)	16

== Certifications ==
Region	Certification	Certified units/sales
Canada (Music Canada)	Gold	50,000^{^}
^{^} Shipments figures based on certification alone.
