= How Far Does a Goodbye Go =

Single by Jason Aldean

from the album Songs About Us
- Released: September 12, 2025
- Genre: Country; country rock
- Length: 3:55
- Label: BBR
- Songwriters: Kurt Allison; John Edwards; Tully Kennedy; John Morgan
- Producer: Michael Knox

Jason Aldean singles chronology
"Whiskey Drink" (2024)	"How Far Does a Goodbye Go" (2025)	"Don't Tell on Me" (2026)

"How Far Does a Goodbye Go" is a song by American country music singer Jason Aldean. It was released on September 12, 2025, as the lead single from his twelfth studio album, Songs About Us. The song was co-written by Kurt Allison, John Edwards, Tully Kennedy, and John Morgan and was produced by Aldean's longtime collaborator Michael Knox.

== History ==
Aldean announced the single in a video message on Instagram on September 5, 2025.

Upon release, Aldean described "How Far Does a Goodbye Go" as a song written "for anybody who has ever felt the sting of a breakup."

== Critical reception and commercial performance ==
The reception to the single was largely positive. Country Now praised Aldean's vocal delivery, calling it his strongest in years and comparing the song's sound to his earlier hits such as "The Truth" and tracks from his Wide Open era. Whiskey Riff noted that the single stands out against Aldean's recent catalog, suggesting it recalls the style that first made him popular in the 2000s and early 2010s.

"How Far Does a Goodbye Go" debuted at number 19 on the Billboard Country Airplay chart dated September 27, 2025, tying Aldean's highest debut on that chart. The single earned 10 million audience impressions in its first week, powered in part by first-day airplay from iHeartRadio stations. It matched the chart debuts of Aldean's 2012 single "Take a Little Ride" and 2014's "Burnin' It Down", both of which later became number one hits. It reached number one on the week ending February 21, 2026, becoming Aldean's 26th number-one and his first since "Trouble with a Heartbreak" in May 2022.

Melinda Newman and Jessica Nicholson ranked the song as the second-best song on the album.

== Personnel ==
=== Musicians ===
- Jason Aldean – vocals
- Michael Knox – programming
- Rich Redmond – drums
- Tully Kennedy – bass, programming
- Kurt Allison – electric guitar, programming
- Adam Shoenfeld – electric guitar
- Danny Rader – 12-string acoustic guitar
- Tony Harrell – Hammond organ
- Mike Johnson – pedal steel guitar
- Blake Bollinger – programming

=== Technical ===
- Michael Knox – producer
- Peter Coleman – engineer
- Brandon Epps – editing, assistant engineer
- Mickey Jack Cones – vocal engineer
- Jeff Braun – mixing
- Adam Ayan – mastering

== Charts ==
Weekly chart performance for "How Far Does a Goodbye Go"
Chart (2025–2026)	Peak position
Canada Country (Billboard)	18
US Billboard Hot 100	37
US Country Airplay (Billboard)	1
US Hot Country Songs (Billboard)	12
