= Here Today, Here Tomorrow =

Single by George Fox

from the album Spice of Life
- Released: 1991
- Genre: Country
- Length: 3:19
- Label: WEA
- Songwriters: Bob DiPiero; John Scott Sherrill; George Fox
- Producer: Garth Fundis

George Fox singles chronology
| "I Know Where You Go" (1991) | "Here Today, Here Tomorrow" (1991) | "Spice of Life" (1992) |

"Here Today, Here Tomorrow" is a song recorded by Canadian country music artist George Fox. It was released in 1991 as the third single from his third studio album, Spice of Life. It peaked at number 10 on the RPM Country Tracks chart in April 1992.

== Chart performance ==
| Chart (1991–1992) | Peak position |
|---|---|
| Canada Country Singles (RPM) | 10 |

=== Year-end charts ===
| Chart (1992) | Position |
|---|---|
| Canada Country Tracks (RPM) | 98 |
