= Mustang Heart =

Studio album by George Fox
- Released: 1993
- Genre: Country
- Label: Warner Music Canada
- Producer: Bob Gaudio

George Fox chronology
Spice of Life (1991)	Mustang Heart (1993)	Time of My Life (1995)

Professional ratings
Review scores
Source	Rating
Allmusic	2.5/5 stars

Mustang Heart is the fourth studio album by Canadian country music artist George Fox. It was released by Warner Music Canada in 1993. The album peaked at number 7 on the RPM Country Albums chart and was certified gold by the CRIA.

== Track listing ==
1. "Mustang Heart"
2. "Daughter of the Rockies"
3. "Great Big Green Eyes"
4. "Breakfast Alone"
5. "Wear and Tear on My Heart"
6. "Better Love Next Time"
7. "Honest Man"
8. "No Hasta la Vista Tonight"
9. "Good Memories"
10. "Clearly Canadian"

== Chart performance ==
Chart (1993)	Peak position
Canadian RPM Country Albums	7
