= Won't Be Lonely Long =

Single by Josh Thompson

from the album Way Out Here
- Released: November 22, 2010
- Genre: Country
- Length: 3:44
- Label: Columbia Nashville
- Songwriters: Josh Thompson, George Ducas, Arlis Albritton
- Producer: Michael Knox

Josh Thompson singles chronology
"Way Out Here" (2010)	"Won't Be Lonely Long" (2010)	"Comin' Around" (2011)

"Won't Be Lonely Long" is a song co-written and recorded by American country music singer Josh Thompson. It was released in November 2010 as the third single from his album Way Out Here. Thompson wrote the song with George Ducas and Arliss Albritton.

== Content ==
The song is about a male who is heartbroken, but claims that he "won't be lonely long" once he goes to a bar and parties with his friends.

== Critical reception ==
Kyle Ward of Roughstock gave it 3½ stars out of 5. He contrasted it with Dierks Bentley's "How Am I Doin'", saying that it lacked that song's "sharp tongued wit", but said that it was "still an infectious listen that’s not over-produced, has a sound beat, and will be a welcomed sing along".

== Music video ==
The song had two music videos: an acoustic one released in 2009, and a second using the album version. The latter was directed by Wes Edwards.

== Chart performance ==
Chart (2010–2011)	Peak position
US Hot Country Songs (Billboard)	25

=== Year-end charts ===
Chart (2011)	Position
US Country Songs (Billboard)	89
