= Noise (Kenny Chesney song) =

Single by Kenny Chesney

from the album Cosmic Hallelujah
- Released: March 24, 2016
- Recorded: 2016
- Genre: Country
- Length: 3:26
- Label: Blue Chair; Columbia Nashville
- Songwriters: Kenny Chesney; Ross Copperman; Shane McAnally; Jon Nite
- Producers: Buddy Cannon; Kenny Chesney

Kenny Chesney singles chronology
"Save It for a Rainy Day" (2015)	"Noise" (2016)	"Setting the World on Fire" (2016)

"Noise" is a song co-written and recorded by American country music artist Kenny Chesney. It was released in March 2016 as the first single from his 2016 album Cosmic Hallelujah. Chesney wrote this song with Ross Copperman, Shane McAnally, and Jon Nite.

== Music video ==
The music video was directed by Shaun Silva and premiered in May 2016.

== Commercial performance ==
"Noise" entered the U.S. Billboard Country Airplay chart at number 21 during its first week of release, making this Chesney's record-extending ninth top 25 debut. The song debuted on the Hot Country Songs chart at number 33. The following week, when it was released for sale, the song debuted at number 2 on the Country Digital Songs chart, selling 33,000 copies. Afterward, it then rose to number 14 on Hot Country Songs. As of August 2016, the song has sold 214,000 copies in the United States.

== Charts ==
=== Weekly charts ===
Chart (2016)	Peak position
Canada Hot 100 (Billboard)	98
Canada Country (Billboard)	5
US Billboard Hot 100	72
US Country Airplay (Billboard)	6
US Hot Country Songs (Billboard)	14

=== Year end charts ===
Chart (2016)	Position
US Country Airplay (Billboard)	44
US Hot Country Songs (Billboard)	46

== Certifications ==
Certifications for "Noise"
Region	Certification	Certified units/sales
Canada (Music Canada)	Gold	40,000^{‡}
United States (RIAA)	Gold	500,000^{‡}
^{‡} Sales+streaming figures based on certification alone.
