= No Zip Code =

Studio album by David Lee Murphy
- Released: April 6, 2018
- Genre: Country
- Label: Reviver
- Producer: Murphy; Buddy Cannon; Kenny Chesney

David Lee Murphy chronology
Tryin' to Get There (2004)	No Zip Code (2018)

Singles from No Zip Code
- 1. "Everything's Gonna Be Alright" Released: November 6, 2017; 2. "I Won't Be Sorry" Released: July 30, 2018

No Zip Code is the fifth studio album by American country music singer David Lee Murphy. It was released on April 6, 2018, via Reviver Records. Murphy produced the album with Kenny Chesney and Chesney's longtime producer, Buddy Cannon. The album's lead single is "Everything's Gonna Be Alright", a duet with Chesney which reached #1 on the US country chart. The album's second single "I Won't Be Sorry" released to country radio in 2018.

== Content ==
The album's lead single is "Everything's Gonna Be Alright", a duet with Kenny Chesney. Although it is Murphy's first single release in 14 years, he has written several songs for other artists in the interim. Murphy and Chesney produced the album with Chesney's longtime producer, Buddy Cannon. Murphy told Rolling Stone Country that "We took our time picking the songs from the get-go. We were under no pressure. We recorded and overdubbed at our own pace". According to MusicRow, Murphy was inspired to record an album after sending several songs that he had written to Chesney, who encouraged him to start recording again. The disc features eleven songs, all co-written by Murphy. The track "Winnebago" previously appeared on Chesney's 2016 album Cosmic Hallelujah.

== Commercial performance ==
The album debuted as No. 35 on Billboard's Top Country Albums, and No. 20 on Independent Albums, selling 2,600 copies in the first week. It has sold 5,900 copies in the United States as of June 2018.

== Track listing ==
All tracks are written by David Lee Murphy, with additional co-writers as noted.

No.	Title	Writer(s)	Length
1.	"Way Gone"	Marv Green	4:35
2.	"No Zip Code"	Jesse Murphy, Shane Minor	3:05
3.	"Everything's Gonna Be Alright" (with Kenny Chesney)	Jimmy Yeary, Chris Stevens	3:49
4.	"I Won’t Be Sorry"	Jason Sellers, Paul Jenkins	4:15
5.	"Haywire"	Yeary	3:05
6.	"As the Crow Flies"	Dean Dillon, Jamey Johnson, Phil O’Donnell	3:22
7.	"Winnebago"		3:05
8.	"Get Go"	Brett Beavers, Jim Beavers	4:09
9.	"That’s Alright"	J. Murphy, Minor	3:39
10.	"Voice of Reason"		3:52
11.	"Waylon and Willie (And a Bottle of Jack)"	Billy Burnette	3:39

== Personnel ==
Adapted from AllMusic

- Jessi Alexander - background vocals
- Mike Brignardello - bass guitar
- Pat Buchanan - electric guitar
- Tom Bukovac - electric guitar
- Kenny Chesney - duet vocals on "Everything's Gonna Be Alright"
- Perry Coleman - background vocals
- J.T. Corenflos - electric guitar
- Chad Cromwell - drums
- Kenny Greenberg - acoustic guitar, electric guitar
- Rob McNelley - electric guitar
- David Lee Murphy - lead vocals, background vocals
- Justin Ostrander - 12-string acoustic guitar, electric guitar
- Danny Rader - banjo, bouzouki, acoustic guitar
- Michael Rhodes - bass guitar
- Mike Rojas - accordion, Hammond B-3 organ, piano, synthesizer, Wurlitzer
- Scotty Sanders - steel guitar
- F. Reid Shippen - programming
- Chris Stevens - keyboards, programming, background vocals
- Dan Tyminski - acoustic guitar, background vocals
- Derek Wells - electric guitar
- John Willis - banjo, dobro, acoustic guitar

== Charts ==
Chart (2018)	Peak position
US Independent Albums (Billboard)	20
US Top Country Albums (Billboard)	35
