= George Fox (singer) =

- Born: William George Fox; March 23, 1960 (age 66); Calgary, Alberta, Canada
- Origin: Cochrane, Alberta, Canada
- Genres: Country
- Occupation: singer/songwriter
- Years active: 1987–present
- Labels: Warner Music Canada, Warner Bros. Nashville, Royalty
- Website: www.georgefox.com

George Fox (born March 23, 1960) is a Canadian country/western music singer/songwriter raised in Cochrane, Alberta, the son of cattle ranchers Bert and Gert Fox.

== Career ==
His first single, "Angelina", reached No. 8 on the Canadian country music charts. In subsequent years, "Goldmine", "No Trespassing", "Mustang Heart", "I Give You My Word", "What's Holding Me" and "Breakfast Alone" also became top 10 singles and signature songs. He has written a book of short stories depicting ranch life entitled My First Cow.

== Honours ==
Awards include the Canadian Country Music Awards (CCMA) Male Vocalist Of The Year (three times) and the Juno Awards Country Male Vocalist Of The Year (three times). Fox was host of the CCMA Awards television show from 1991 to 1994.

In 1995, his home town of Cochrane named a new street George Fox Trail in his honour.

In September 2022 he was inducted into the Canadian Country Music Hall of Fame.

== Personal life ==
Fox and his wife Monica live near Ancaster in southern Ontario with their two daughters.

== Discography ==
=== Studio albums ===
Title	Details	Peak chart positions		Certifications (sales thresholds)
Title	Details	CAN Country	CAN	Certifications (sales thresholds)
George Fox	Release date: 1988; Label: Warner Music Canada	16	—	CAN: Gold
With All My Might	Release date: 1989; Label: Warner Music Canada	—	84	CAN: Gold
Spice of Life	Release date: 1991; Label: Warner Music Canada	23	—	
Mustang Heart	Release date: 1993; Label: Warner Music Canada	7	—	CAN: Gold
Time of My Life	Release date: 1995; Label: Warner Music Canada	4	—	CAN: Gold
Survivor	Release date: May 19, 1998; Label: Warner Music Canada	—	—	
George Fox Christmas	Release date: 1999; Label: Trail of the Fox	—	—	
Canadian	Release date: June 1, 2004; Label: Trail of the Fox	*	—	
With All Due Respect	Release date: 2006; Label: Trail of the Fox	*	—	
"—" denotes releases that did not chart * denotes unknown peak positions

=== Compilation albums ===
Title	Details	Certifications (sales thresholds)
Greatest Hits 1987–1997	Release date: March 4, 1997; Label: Warner Music Canada	CAN: Gold
The Essentials George Fox	Release date: August 30, 2005; Label: Warner Music Canada	

=== Singles ===
Year	Single	Peak positions	Album
Year	Single	CAN Country	Album
1988	"Angelina" (Note: "Angelina" peaked at No. 7 on the Billboard Hot Country Radio Breakouts chart in 1990.)	8	George Fox
1988	"Long Distance"	16	George Fox
1989	"RBJ"	35	George Fox
1989	"Goldmine"	9	George Fox
1989	"No Trespassing"	10	With All My Might
1990	"Bachelor Girl"	4	With All My Might
1990	"Lime Rickey"	10	With All My Might
1990	"With All My Might" (Note: "With All My Might" also peaked at number 28 on the RPM Adult Contemporary Tracks chart.)	5	With All My Might
1991	"Fell in Love and I Can't Get Out"	20	Spice of Life
1991	"I Know Where You Go"	20	Spice of Life
1991	"Here Today, Here Tomorrow"	10	Spice of Life
1992	"Spice of Life"	21	Spice of Life
1992	"Clearly Canadian"	9	Mustang Heart
1993	"Mustang Heart"	6	Mustang Heart
1993	"Breakfast Alone"	10	Mustang Heart
1993	"Honest Man"	8	Mustang Heart
1994	"No Hasta la Vista Tonight"	5	Mustang Heart
1994	"Wear and Tear on My Heart"	4	Mustang Heart
1995	"What's Holding Me"	1	Time of My Life
1995	"First Comes Love"	1	Time of My Life
1995	"Time of My Life"	10	Time of My Life
1997	"I Give You My Word"	7	Greatest Hits 1987-1997
1997	"The Night the Barn Burned Down"	17	Greatest Hits 1987-1997
1998	"I'm Gone"	6	Survivor
1998	"Do the Math"	17	Survivor
1998	"Survivor"	22	Survivor
1999	"How Do I Get There From Her"	20	Survivor
2004	"High Toned Years"	—	Canadian
"—" denotes releases that did not chart

=== Music videos ===
Year	Video	Director
1989	"No Trespassing"	
1991	"I Know Where You Go"	
1995	"What's Holding Me"	
1995	"First Comes Love"	Sara Nichols
1997	"I Give You My Word"	Sara Nichols
1998	"Do the Math"	
1998	"Survivor"	
