= Do the Math =

Single by George Fox

from the album Survivor
- Released: 1998
- Genre: Country
- Length: 2:53
- Label: WEA
- Songwriters: George Fox; Kim Tribble
- Producer: Kim Tribble

George Fox singles chronology
"I'm Gone" (1998)	"Do the Math" (1998)	"Survivor" (1998)

"Do the Math" is a song recorded by Canadian country music artist George Fox. It was released in 1998 as the second single from his sixth studio album, Survivor. It peaked at number 17 on the RPM Country Tracks chart in September 1998.

== Chart performance ==
Chart (1998)	Peak position
Canada Country Singles (RPM)	17

=== Year-end charts ===
Chart (1998)	Position
Canada Country Tracks (RPM)	95
