= Tryin' to Get There =

Studio album by David Lee Murphy
- Released: March 23, 2004
- Genre: Country
- Label: Audium Records
- Producer: David Lee Murphy, Kim Tribble

David Lee Murphy chronology
We Can't All Be Angels (1997)	Tryin' to Get There (2004)	No Zip Code (2018)

Singles from Tryin to Get There
- 1. "Loco" Released: January 5, 2004

Professional ratings
Review scores
Source	Rating
Allmusic	link
Country Weekly	link

Tryin' to Get There is the fourth studio album by American country music artist David Lee Murphy. It was released on March 23, 2004 by Audium Records. Its lead-off single "Loco", released in early 2004, was a Top 5 hit on the Billboard Hot Country Singles & Tracks charts. "Inspiration" was also released, but failed to make Top 40. Audium/Koch closed its country division in 2005.

== Track listing ==
All songs written by David Lee Murphy and Kim Tribble, unless noted otherwise.

No.	Title	Writer(s)	Length
1.	"I Like It Already"		4:05
2.	"Same Ol' Same Ol'"		3:54
3.	"Loco"		3:07
4.	"Own Little World"		3:09
5.	"Tryin' to Get There"	Murphy, Waylon Jennings	4:20
6.	"Inspiration" (featuring Lee Roy Parnell)	Murphy	3:59
7.	"Ghost in the Jukebox"	Murphy	4:01
8.	"She Always Said"		3:47
9.	"Mama's Last"		3:31
10.	"Beggin' for Affection"	Murphy	2:59
11.	"Might Be Me"	Murphy	4:35
12.	"Killin' the Pain"	Murphy, Tribble, Bill Rice	4:24

== Personnel ==
- Larry Beaird – acoustic guitar
- Spady Brannan – bass guitar
- Mike Brignardello – bass guitar
- Pat Buchanan – electric guitar, harmonica
- J. T. Corenflos – acoustic guitar, electric guitar
- Thom Flora – background vocals
- Steve Hinson – steel guitar
- Paul Leim – drums
- Gordon Mote – keyboards
- David Lee Murphy – lead vocals, background vocals, acoustic guitar
- Jimmy Nichols – keyboards
- Russ Pahl – acoustic guitar, electric guitar, steel guitar
- Lee Roy Parnell – slide guitar and background vocals on "Inspiration"
- Dave Pomeroy – bass guitar
- Paul Scholten – drums, percussion
- Hank Singer – fiddle, mandolin
- Russell Terrell – background vocals
- Kim Tribble – background vocals

== Chart performance ==
Chart (2004)	Peak position
U.S. Billboard Top Country Albums	46
U.S. Billboard Independent Albums	32
