= Gettin' Out the Good Stuff =

Studio album by David Lee Murphy
- Released: May 21, 1996
- Genre: country
- Length: 39:16
- Label: MCA Nashville
- Producer: Tony Brown

David Lee Murphy chronology
Out with a Bang (1995)	Gettin' Out the Good Stuff (1996)	We Can't All Be Angels (1997)

Singles from Gettin' Out the Good Stuff
- 1. "Every Time I Get Around You" Released: March 18, 1996; 2. "The Road You Leave Behind" Released: July 22, 1996

Gettin' Out the Good Stuff is the second studio album by American country music artist David Lee Murphy. The tracks "Every Time I Get Around You" and "The Road You Leave Behind" were both Top 5 hits on the U.S. Billboard Hot Country Singles & Tracks charts in 1996. "Genuine Rednecks" and "Breakfast in Birmingham" were released as well, although neither reached Top 40 on the country charts.

Professional ratings
Review scores
Source	Rating
Allmusic	link
Entertainment Weekly	B link

== Track listing ==
All tracks written or co-written by David Lee Murphy. Co-writers are named in parentheses.

No.	Title	Writer(s)	Length
1.	"Every Time I Get Around You"		3:25
2.	"The Road You Leave Behind"		3:53
3.	"She's Really Something to See"		3:57
4.	"Genuine Rednecks"		4:14
5.	"100 Years Too Late"	Dobie Gray	4:10
6.	"Born THat Way"	Jimbeau Hinson	3:06
7.	"Breakfast in Birmingham"	Kim Tribble	3:35
8.	"Gettin' Out the Good Stuff"		3:41
9.	"I've Been a Rebel (And It Don't Pay)"		4:35
10.	"Pirate's Cove"		4:28

== Personnel ==
- Mike Brignardello – bass guitar
- Chad Cromwell – drums
- Stuart Duncan – fiddle on "She's Really Something to See" and "Genuine Rednecks"
- Paul Franklin – steel guitar
- David Hargis – electric guitar on "Gettin' out the Good Stuff"
- Jimbeau Hinson – background vocals on "Born That Way"
- Brent Mason – acoustic guitar, electric guitar
- David Lee Murphy – lead vocals, background vocals, acoustic guitar
- Steve Nathan – keyboards
- Mickey Raphael – harmonica on "100 Years Too Late" and "Pirates Cove"
- Harry Stinson – background vocals on "Genuine Rednecks", "100 Years Too Late" and "Breakfast in Birmingham"
- Biff Watson – acoustic guitar

== Chart performance ==
Chart (1996)	Peak position
U.S. Billboard Top Country Albums	12
U.S. Billboard 200	104
Canadian RPM Country Albums	6
