= Time of Your Life =

Time of Your Life may refer to:

== Literature ==
- The Time of Your Life, a 1939 play by William Saroyan
- Time of Your Life (novel), based on the Doctor Who TV series

== Film and television ==
- Time of Your Life (American TV series), an American drama series, starring Jennifer Love Hewitt
- Time of Your Life (1963 TV series), a 1963–1965 Canadian television youth variety show that aired on CBC
- Time of Your Life (1988 TV series), a 1988–1989 Canadian soap opera television series created by Harry Jakobs and Maryse Wilder that aired on CFCF
- The Time of Your Life (film), a 1948 adaptation of the William Saroyan play starring James Cagney
- The Time of Your Life (TV series), a 2007 British drama series, starring Genevieve O'Reilly
- The Time of Your Life (Playhouse 90), a television adaptation of the William Saroyan play

== Music ==
- "Good Riddance (Time of Your Life)", a Green Day song from the 1997 album Nimrod
- "The Time of Your Life", a song by Randy Newman from the soundtrack of the animated movie A Bug's Life
- "Time of Your Life", a 2012 song by Kid Ink from the album Up & Away
- "Time of Your Life", a song by Mariah Carey
- "Time of Your Life", a song by Stephanie Mills from her 1985 self-titled album

== Other ==
- "Time of Your Life" (Buffy comic), a story arc in the Buffy the Vampire Slayer Season Eight comic book series

== See also ==
- "Times of Your Life", a 1975 Paul Anka song
- Time of Our Lives (disambiguation)
- The Time of My Life (disambiguation)
