= Time of Our Lives =

Time of Our Lives or The Time of Our Lives may refer to:

== Music ==
- Time of Our Lives (album), a 1999 album by Marcia Hines
- The Time of Our Lives (EP), a 2009 EP by Miley Cyrus, or the title track
- "Time of Our Lives", a 2002 Bonnie Raitt song from Silver Lining
- "The Time of Our Lives", one of two songs on the double A-side single "Time of Our Lives/Connected" by Paul van Dyk, 2003
- "The Time of Our Lives" (Il Divo and Toni Braxton song), 2006
- "Time of Our Lives", 2010 song by Tyrone Wells from the album Metal & Wood
- "Time of Our Lives", 2011 song by Night Ranger from the album Somewhere in California
- "Time of Our Lives", 2013 song by British boy band ReConnected
- "Time of Our Lives" (Chawki song), 2014
- "Time of Our Lives" (Pitbull and Ne-Yo song), 2014
- "Time of Our Lives", 2017 song by James Blunt
- "Time of Our Lives", 2017 EDM single by Manse featuring Jantine
- Time of Our Lives (residency), a Las Vegas concert residency by Pitbull
- Time of Our Life (song), a 2019 single by Day6

== Other ==
- Time of Our Lives (TV series), a 2009 television series hosted by Jeff Stelling for Sky Sports
- The Time of Our Lives: A Conversation About America, a 2011 book by Tom Brokaw
- The Time of Our Lives (TV series), a 2013-2014 Australian television drama series

== See also ==
- Times of Our Lives, an album by Judy Collins
- Time of Your Life (disambiguation)
- Time of My Life (disambiguation)
