= All the Pretty Girls (Kenny Chesney song) =

Single by Kenny Chesney

from the album Cosmic Hallelujah
- Released: June 5, 2017
- Recorded: 2016
- Length: 3:32
- Label: Blue Chair; Columbia Nashville
- Songwriters: Nicolle Galyon; Tommy Lee James; Josh Osborne
- Producers: Buddy Cannon; Kenny Chesney

Kenny Chesney singles chronology
"Bar at the End of the World" (2017)	"All the Pretty Girls" (2017)	"Everything's Gonna Be Alright" (2017)

"All the Pretty Girls" is a song written by Nicolle Galyon, Tommy Lee James, and Josh Osborne and recorded by American country music artist Kenny Chesney, released on June 5, 2017 as the fourth and final single from Chesney's seventeenth studio album Cosmic Hallelujah (2016).

== Commercial performance ==
As of October 2017, the song has sold 110,000 copies in the United States.

== Music video ==
The accompanying music video for this song was directed and produced by William Renner and Jessica Martinez and premiered on CMT, GAC and Vevo in August 2017.

== Charts ==
Chart (2017)	Peak position
Canada Country (Billboard)	2
US Billboard Hot 100	63
US Country Airplay (Billboard)	1
US Hot Country Songs (Billboard)	7

=== Year-end charts ===
Chart (2017)	Position
Canada Country (Billboard)	25
US Country Airplay (Billboard)	38
US Hot Country Songs (Billboard)	39

== Certifications ==
Region	Certification	Certified units/sales
United States (RIAA)	2× Platinum	2,000,000^{‡}
^{‡} Sales+streaming figures based on certification alone.
