= Beer on the Table =

Single by Josh Thompson

from the album Way Out Here
- Released: July 27, 2009
- Genre: Country
- Length: 3:30
- Label: Columbia Nashville
- Songwriters: Ken Johnson; Josh Thompson; Andi Zack
- Producer: Michael Knox

Josh Thompson singles chronology
"Beer on the Table" (2009)	"Way Out Here" (2010)

"Beer on the Table" is a song co-written and recorded by American country music singer Josh Thompson. It was released in July 2009 as his debut single and the first from his debut album Way Out Here. Thompson wrote this song with Ken Johnson and Andi Zack.

== Critical reception ==
Juli Thanki of Engine 145 gave the song a thumbs-up, calling some of the lyrics "cringe-inducing" but also saying that she thought Thompson had a distinctive voice. Similarly, Bobby Peacock of Roughstock said that Thompson has "an everyman quality to his voice that lends it a sense of authenticity."

== Chart performance ==
"Beer on the Table" debuted at number 55 on the U.S. Billboard Hot Country Songs chart dated August 15, 2009, and reached a peak of number 17 in February 2010.

Chart (2009–2010)	Peak position
US Hot Country Songs (Billboard)	17
US Billboard Bubbling Under Hot 100	3
