= We Can't All Be Angels =

Studio album by David Lee Murphy
- Released: September 23, 1997
- Recorded: Ocean Way, Nashville
- Genre: Country
- Length: 38:46
- Label: MCA
- Producer: Tony Brown

David Lee Murphy chronology
Gettin' Out the Good Stuff (1996)	We Can't All Be Angels (1997)	Tryin' to Get There (2004)

Singles from We Can't All Be Angels
- 1. "All Lit Up in Love" Released: July 5, 1997; 2. "Just Don't Wait Around 'Til She's Leavin'" Released: November 15, 1997

We Can't All Be Angels is the third studio album by American country music artist David Lee Murphy. It was also his final studio album for MCA, and it produced two singles on the Hot Country Songs charts: "All Lit up in Love" and "Just Don't Wait Around 'Til She's Leavin'".

The album's title track is also included on the soundtrack to the 1998 film Black Dog.

== Track listing ==
All tracks written or co-written by David Lee Murphy. Co-writers are named in parentheses.

No.	Title	Writer(s)	Length
1.	"She Don't Try (To Make Me Love Her)"		3:21
2.	"Just Don't Wait Around 'Til She's Leavin'"		3:07
3.	"We Can't All Be Angel"	Danny Tate	4:18
4.	"Bringin' Her Back"	Bill Lloyd	3:26
5.	"Kentucky Girl"		2:20
6.	"That's Behind Me"		4:10
7.	"I Could Believe Anything"		3:37
8.	"All Lit Up in Love"		2:52
9.	"Almost Like Being There"	Kim Tribble	3:21
10.	"Velvet Lies"	Buddy Cannon	3:21
11.	"She's Not Mine"		4:53
12.	"Just Don't Wait Around 'Til She's Leavin'" (alternate version, hidden track)		3:09

== Personnel ==
- Richard Bennett - acoustic guitar, electric guitar, bouzouki
- Mike Brignardello - bass guitar
- Max Carl - background vocals
- Chad Cromwell - drums
- Paul Franklin - steel guitar
- Liana Manis - background vocals
- Brent Mason - acoustic guitar, electric guitar
- Terry McMillan - percussion
- David Lee Murphy - lead vocals, background vocals, acoustic guitar
- Steve Nathan - Hammond organ

== Chart performance ==
Chart (1997)	Peak position
U.S. Billboard Top Country Albums	39
