= No Hasta la Vista Tonight =

Single by George Fox

from the album Mustang Heart
- Released: 1994
- Genre: Country
- Label: WEA
- Songwriters: George Fox; Bob Gaudio
- Producer: Bob Gaudio

George Fox singles chronology
"Honest Man" (1993)	"No Hasta la Vista Tonight" (1994)	"Wear and Tear on My Heart" (1994)

"No Hasta la Vista Tonight" is a song recorded by Canadian country music artist George Fox. It was released in 1994 as the fifth single from his fourth studio album, Mustang Heart. It peaked at number 5 on the RPM Country Tracks chart in June 1994.

== Chart performance ==
Chart (1994)	Peak position
Canada Country Singles (RPM)	5

=== Year-end charts ===
Chart (1994)	Position
Canada Country Tracks (RPM)	66
