= Honest Man (song) =

Single by George Fox

from the album Mustang Heart
- Released: 1993
- Genre: Country
- Label: WEA
- Songwriters: George Fox; B. Dennis
- Producer: Bob Gaudio

George Fox singles chronology
"Breakfast Alone" (1993)	"Honest Man" (1993)	"No Hasta la Vista Tonight" (1994)

"Honest Man" is a song recorded by Canadian country music artist George Fox. It was released in 1993 as the fourth single from his fourth studio album, Mustang Heart. It peaked at number 8 on the RPM Country Tracks chart in January 1994.

== Chart performance ==
Chart (1993–1994)	Peak position
Canada Country Singles (RPM)	8
