= Clint Daniels =

American singer-songwriter

- Born: Clint Allen Daniels; August 24, 1974 (age 52)
- Origin: Panama City, Florida, United States
- Genre: Country
- Occupation: Singer
- Instruments: Vocals, guitar
- Years active: 1998–present
- Labels: Arista Nashville, Epic
- Website: ClintDaniels.com

Clint Allen Daniels (born August 24, 1974) is an American country music artist. Signed to Arista Nashville in 1998, Daniels charted two singles for the label. In 2003, Daniels signed to Epic Records, releasing a third single but no album. He has co-written singles that reached #1 on the US Country Music charts for Joe Nichols and Montgomery Gentry, as well as a Top 20 hit for Brooks & Dunn. He released the album Brown Bottle Blues in 2018.

== Biography ==
Clint Daniels was born August 24, 1974, in Panama City, Florida, but raised in the Panama City suburb of Lynn Haven. Daniels first gained an interest in music as a child, singing with his sister in church. Inspired by bluegrass music, Daniels taught himself to play guitar at age twelve. After graduating high school, he moved to Nashville, Tennessee, in pursuit of a career in country music. By 1998, he was discovered by an A&R staff member from the Arista Nashville label, and was signed to the label that year.

He charted two singles, "A Fool's Progress" and "When I Grow Up," which respectively reached No. 44 and No. 53 on the country singles charts. Both were to have been included on a self-titled debut album, which was ultimately not officially released due to Arista's restructuring (although advance promo copies and even stock copies of the album exist on CD). Daniels subsequently moved to Epic Records in 2003. He released a third single, the No. 56 "The Letter (Almost Home)," and recorded a second album for Epic that was assigned a catalogue number as promoted as "upcoming" -- but it too was never released, and does not even appear to have made it as far as a promotional pressing.

Daniels, who co-wrote much of his own material, put his recording career on the back burner at this juncture, focusing on co-writing songs for other country artists. His work in this field includes co-penning the #1 Country chart hits "Brokenheartsville" by Joe Nichols and "Roll with Me" by Montgomery Gentry (from 2003 and 2008 respectively), as well as Brooks & Dunn's 2008 single "God Must Be Busy". He also co-wrote two songs that were released in late 2010: Clay Walker's "Where Do I Go from You" and Easton Corbin's "I Can't Love You Back". In late 2013, he co-wrote Josh Thompson's "Cold Beer with Your Name on It". In late 2017, he co-wrote Jon Pardi's "She Ain't in It".

After a long layoff from recording, Daniels finally issued his first commercially available album (Brown Bottle Blues) in 2018. Self-released digitally via on-line streaming services, Brown Bottle Blues consisted of newly written and recorded tracks, and contained none of the material from his Arista or Epic sessions.

In early 2019, he co-wrote Eric Church's "Some of It".

== Discography ==
=== Singles ===
| Year | Single | Peak positions | | Album |
| Year | Single | US Country | CAN Country | Album |
|---|---|---|---|---|
| 1998 | "A Fool's Progress" | 44 | 42 | Clint Daniels (unreleased) |
| 1998 | "When I Grow Up" | 53 | — | Clint Daniels (unreleased) |
| 2003 | "The Letter (Almost Home)" | 56 | — | Non-album single |
"—" denotes releases that did not chart

=== Music videos ===
| Year | Video | Director |
|---|---|---|
| 1998 | "A Fool's Progress" | chris rogers [sic] |
| 1998 | "When I Grow Up" | Steven Goldmann |
