= Bachelor Girl (song) =

Single by George Fox

from the album With All My Might
- Released: 1990
- Genre: Country
- Length: 2:56
- Label: WEA
- Songwriter: George Fox

George Fox singles chronology
"No Trespassing" (1989)	"Bachelor Girl" (1990)	"Lime Rickey" (1990)

"Bachelor Girl" is a song recorded by Canadian country music artist George Fox. It was released in 1990 as the second single from his second studio album, With All My Might (1989). It peaked at number 4 on the RPM Country Tracks chart in May 1990.

== Chart performance ==
Chart (1990)	Peak position
Canada Country Singles (RPM)	4

=== Year-end charts ===
Chart (1990)	Position
Canada Country Tracks (RPM)	43
