= Everything's Gonna Be Alright (David Lee Murphy and Kenny Chesney song) =

Single by David Lee Murphy with Kenny Chesney

from the album No Zip Code
- Released: November 6, 2017
- Recorded: 2017
- Genre: Country pop, reggae
- Length: 3:49
- Label: Reviver
- Songwriter(s): David Lee Murphy; Jimmy Yeary; Chris Stevens
- Producer(s): Buddy Cannon; Kenny Chesney; David Lee Murphy

David Lee Murphy singles chronology
"Inspiration" (2004)	"Everything's Gonna Be Alright" (2017)	"I Won't Be Sorry" (2018)

Kenny Chesney singles chronology
"All the Pretty Girls" (2017)	"Everything's Gonna Be Alright" (2017)	"Get Along" (2018)

"Everything's Gonna Be Alright" is a song by American country music artist David Lee Murphy as a duet with Kenny Chesney. It was released in November 2017 as the lead single to Murphy's 2018 album No Zip Code. The song reached number one on the US Billboard Country Airplay chart, becoming Murphy's first number one since 1995's "Dust on the Bottle". Murphy co-wrote this song with Jimmy Yeary and Chris Stevens.

== Content ==
The song features "reggae rhythms, sing-along choruses and a programmed percussion loop that's more pop than country" with a lyric that "reassures listeners" that "everything's gonna be alright".

== Commercial performance ==
On the US Billboard Hot Country Songs chart dated December 16, 2017, the song entered at number 47, making for Murphy's first appearance on that chart since "Inspiration", which peaked at number 46 in 2004. At this point, the song had also been on the Country Airplay chart for four weeks. In June 2018, the song became Murphy's second number one hit, and his first since "Dust on the Bottle" in 1995. It is also Chesney's twenty-ninth number one hit. As of August 2018, the song has sold over 255,000 copies in the United States.

== Charts ==
=== Weekly charts ===
Chart (2017–2018)	Peak position
Canada Country (Billboard)	16
US Billboard Hot 100	66
US Hot Country Songs (Billboard)	9
US Country Airplay (Billboard)	1

=== Year-end charts ===
Chart (2018)	Position
US Country Airplay (Billboard)	6
US Hot Country Songs (Billboard)	38
US Radio Songs (Billboard)	68

== Certifications ==
Region	Certification	Certified units/sales
United States (RIAA)	Platinum	1,000,000^{‡}
^{‡} Sales+streaming figures based on certification alone.
