= Time of My Life (George Fox song) =

Single by George Fox

from the album Time of My Life
- Released: 1995
- Genre: Country
- Length: 3:25
- Label: WEA
- Songwriters: George Fox; Bob Gaudio
- Producer: Bob Gaudio

George Fox singles chronology
"First Comes Love" (1995)	"Time of My Life" (1995)	"I Give You My Word" (1997)

"Time of My Life" is a song recorded by Canadian country music artist George Fox. It was released in 1995 as the third single from his fifth studio album, Time of My Life. It peaked at number 10 on the RPM Country Tracks chart in December 1995.

== Chart performance ==
Chart (1995)	Peak position
Canada Country Singles (RPM)	10
