= Breakfast Alone =

Single by George Fox

from the album Mustang Heart
- Released: 1993
- Genre: Country
- Length: 3:58
- Label: WEA
- Songwriters: George Fox; Bob Gaudio
- Producer: Bob Gaudio

George Fox singles chronology
"Mustang Heart" (1993)	"Breakfast Alone" (1993)	"Honest Man" (1993)

"Breakfast Alone" is a song recorded by Canadian country music artist George Fox. It was released in 1993 as the third single from his fourth studio album, Mustang Heart. It peaked at number 10 on the RPM Country Tracks chart in September 1993.

== Chart performance ==
Chart (1993)	Peak position
Canada Country Singles (RPM)	10
