= Comin' Around =

Single by Josh Thompson

from the album Change: The Lost Record
- Released: December 12, 2011
- Genre: Country
- Length: 3:01
- Label: RCA Nashville
- Songwriters: Josh Thompson, Rodney Clawson, Kendell Marvel
- Producer: Phil O'Donnell

Josh Thompson singles chronology
"Won't Be Lonely Long" (2010)	"Comin' Around" (2011)	"Cold Beer with Your Name on It" (2013)

"Comin' Around" is a song co-written and recorded by American country music singer Josh Thompson. It was released in December 2011 as his fourth single release, his only release for RCA Nashville, and it would have been the first single from his unreleased album Change.

== Content ==
"Comin' Around" is about the male narrator, who has made efforts to improve his life. He says that he has realized his past mistakes, and is "comin' around" to change them. According to co-writer Rodney Clawson, the idea came about when Kendell Marvel offered the title "Comin' Around", and they began discussing a song about "how I didn’t understand all this stuff and I didn’t like all this stuff, but now I’m starting to get it".

== Critical reception ==
Giving it 4 stars out of 5, Bobby Peacock of Roughstock said that "the lyrics are some of his best" and that the story line was believable. It received an identical rating from Billy Dukes at Taste of Country, who said that the song showed "honesty without being too preachy".

== Music video ==
P. R. Brown directed the music video, which was filmed in Nashville, Tennessee in January 2012.

== Chart performance ==
Chart (2011–2012)	Peak position
US Hot Country Songs (Billboard)	31

=== Year-end charts ===
Chart (2012)	Position
US Country Songs (Billboard)	97
