= With All My Might (George Fox song) =

Single by George Fox

from the album With All My Might
- Released: 1990
- Genre: Country
- Length: 4:32
- Label: WEA
- Songwriter: George Fox

George Fox singles chronology
"Lime Rickey" (1990)	"With All My Might" (1990)	"Fell in Love and I Can't Get Out" (1991)

"With All My Might" is a song recorded by Canadian country music artist George Fox. It was released in 1990 as the fourth single from his second studio album, With All My Might. It peaked at number 5 on the RPM Country Tracks chart in March 1991.

== Chart performance ==
Chart (1990–1991)	Peak position
Canada Adult Contemporary (RPM)	28
Canada Country Singles (RPM)	5

=== Year-end charts ===
Chart (1991)	Position
Canada Country Tracks (RPM)	31
