= Mustang Heart (song) =

Single by George Fox

from the album Mustang Heart
- Released: 1993
- Genre: Country
- Label: WEA
- Songwriters: George Fox; Bob Gaudio
- Producer: Bob Gaudio

George Fox singles chronology
"Clearly Canadian" (1992)	"Mustang Heart" (1993)	"Breakfast Alone" (1993)

"Mustang Heart" is a song recorded by Canadian country music artist George Fox. Released in 1993 as the second single from his fourth studio album, Mustang Heart, it peaked at number 6 on the RPM Country Tracks chart in May 1993.

== Chart performance ==
Chart (1993)	Peak position
Canada Country Singles (RPM)	6

=== Year-end charts ===
Chart (1993)	Position
Canada Country Tracks (RPM)	24
