= Time of My Life (George Fox album) =

Studio album by George Fox
- Released: 1995
- Genre: Country
- Length: 36:01
- Label: Warner Music Canada
- Producer: Bob Gaudio

George Fox chronology
Mustang Heart (1993)	Time of My Life (1995)	Greatest Hits 1987–1997 (1997)

Time of My Life is the fifth studio album by Canadian country music artist George Fox. It was released by Warner Music Canada in 1995. The album peaked at number 4 on the RPM Country Albums chart and was certified gold by the CRIA.

== Track listing ==
1. "First Comes Love" – 3:12
2. "A Matter of Fact" – 2:42
3. "How Big a Room" – 3:27
4. "Time of My Life" – 3:25
5. "Mr. Hide" – 4:01
6. "What's Holding Me" – 3:38
7. "So Many Tears" – 3:38
8. "Here's Hoping" – 4:03
9. "Rodeo Man" – 3:45
10. "Colt Thunder" – 4:10

== Chart performance ==
Chart (1995)	Peak position
Canadian RPM Country Albums	4
