= Every Time I Get Around You =

Single by David Lee Murphy

from the album Gettin' Out the Good Stuff
- B-side: "Pirates Cove"
- Released: March 18, 1996
- Genre: Country
- Length: 3:25
- Label: MCA
- Songwriter: David Lee Murphy
- Producer: Tony Brown

David Lee Murphy singles chronology
"Out with a Bang" (1995)	"Every Time I Get Around You" (1996)	"The Road You Leave Behind" (1996)

"Every Time I Get Around You" is a song written and recorded by American country music artist David Lee Murphy. It was released in March 1996 as the first single for his album Gettin' Out the Good Stuff. The song peaked at number 2 on both the U.S. and Canadian country charts. In Canada, the song was the Number One country song of the year on the RPM country singles charts.

== Chart positions ==
"Every Time I Get Around You" debuted at number 63 on the U.S. Billboard Hot Country Singles & Tracks for the week of March 23, 1996.

Chart (1996)	Peak position
Canada Country Singles (RPM)	2
US Hot Country Songs (Billboard)	2

=== Year-end charts ===
Chart (1996)	Position
Canada Country Tracks (RPM)	1
US Country Songs (Billboard)	26
