= First Comes Love (song) =

Single by George Fox

from the album Time of My Life
- Released: 1995
- Genre: Country
- Length: 3:12
- Label: WEA
- Songwriters: George Fox; Bob Gaudio
- Producer: Bob Gaudio

George Fox singles chronology
"What's Holding Me" (1995)	"First Comes Love" (1995)	"Time of My Life" (1995)

"First Comes Love" is a single by Canadian country music artist George Fox. Released in 1995, it was the second single from his album Time of My Life. The song reached #1 on the RPM Country Tracks chart in July 1995.

== Chart performance ==
Chart (1995)	Peak position
Canada Country Singles (RPM)	1

=== Year-end charts ===
Chart (1995)	Position
Canada Country Tracks (RPM)	6
