= Wear and Tear on My Heart =

Single by George Fox

from the album Mustang Heart
- Released: 1994
- Genre: Country
- Label: WEA
- Songwriters: George Fox; Bob Gaudio
- Producer: Bob Gaudio

George Fox singles chronology
"No Hasta la Vista Tonight" (1994)	"Wear and Tear on My Heart" (1994)	"What's Holding Me" (1995)

"Wear and Tear on My Heart" is a song recorded by Canadian country music artist George Fox. It was released in 1994 as the sixth single from his fourth studio album, Mustang Heart. It peaked at number 4 on the RPM Country Tracks chart in October 1994.

== Chart performance ==
Chart (1994)	Peak position
Canada Country Singles (RPM)	4

=== Year-end charts ===
Chart (1994)	Position
Canada Country Tracks (RPM)	48
