= Clearly Canadian (song) =

Single by George Fox

from the album Mustang Heart
- Released: 1992
- Genre: Country
- Length: 3:30
- Label: WEA
- Songwriters: George Fox; Bob Gaudio
- Producers: George Fox; Bob Gaudio

George Fox singles chronology
"Spice of Life" (1992)	"Clearly Canadian" (1992)	"Mustang Heart" (1993)

"Clearly Canadian" is a song recorded by Canadian country music artist George Fox. It was released in 1992 as the first single from his fourth studio album, Mustang Heart. It peaked at number 9 on the RPM Country Tracks chart in December 1992.

== Chart performance ==
Chart (1992)	Peak position
Canada Country Singles (RPM)	9
