= Out with a Bang (album) =

Studio album by David Lee Murphy
- Released: August 30, 1994
- Recorded: 1994
- Studios: Sound Stage Studios, Nashville, TN
- Genre: Country rock
- Length: 33:07
- Label: MCA
- Producer: Tony Brown

David Lee Murphy chronology
Out with a Bang (1994)	Gettin' Out the Good Stuff (1996)

Singles from Out with a Bang
- 1. "Just Once" Released: 1994; 2. "Fish Ain't Bitin'" Released: 1994; 3. "Party Crowd" Released: February 21, 1995; 4. "Dust on the Bottle" Released: August 7, 1995; 5. "Out with a Bang" Released: November 13, 1995

Professional ratings
Review scores
Source	Rating
AllMusic	4/5 stars

Out with a Bang is the debut studio album by American country music artist David Lee Murphy. It features the hit single "Dust on the Bottle", which reached Number One on the Billboard Hot Country Singles & Tracks in late 1995. The track "High Weeds and Rust" was previously recorded by Doug Stone on his 1990 self-titled debut album. "Just Once" is also included on the soundtrack to the 1994 movie 8 Seconds. The album was certified Platinum by the RIAA for sales of 1,000,000.

== Track listing ==
All tracks are written by David Lee Murphy, with additional co-writers as noted.

No.	Title	Writer(s)	Length
1.	"Can't Turn It Off"		3:23
2.	"High Winds and Rust"		2:55
3.	"Party Crowd"	Jimbeau Hinson	3:18
4.	"Mama 'n Them"	Michael Woody	3:23
5.	"Fish Ain't Bitin'"		2:46
6.	"Out with a Bang"	Kim Tribble	2:28
7.	"Greatest Show on Earth"		4:11
8.	"Dust on the Bottle"		3:44
9.	"Just Once"	Tribble	2:59
10.	"Why Can't People Just Get Along"	Minnie Pearl	3:54

== Personnel ==
Adapted from liner notes.

- Richard Bennett – acoustic guitar on "Just Once"
- Mike Brignardello – bass guitar
- Chad Cromwell – drums
- Kenny Edwards – acoustic guitar
- Paul Franklin – steel guitar, pedabro
- John Barlow Jarvis – piano on "Just Once"
- Liana Manis – background vocals
- Brent Mason – electric guitar
- Terry McMillan – harmonica, tambourine
- David Lee Murphy – lead vocals, background vocals, acoustic guitar
- Steve Nathan – piano, organ, Wurlitzer
- Kim Tribble – background vocals

== Charts ==
=== Weekly charts ===
Chart (1994–1995)	Peak position
Canadian Country Albums (RPM)	2
US Billboard 200	52
US Top Country Albums (Billboard)	10
US Heatseekers Albums (Billboard)	1

=== Year-end charts ===
Chart (1995)	Position
US Top Country Albums (Billboard)	52

== Certifications ==
Region	Certification	Certified units/sales
Canada (Music Canada)	Gold	50,000^{^}
United States (RIAA)	Platinum	1,000,000^{‡}
^{^} Shipments figures based on certification alone.^{‡} Sales+streaming figures based on certification alone.
