= No Trespassing (George Fox song) =

1989 song performed by George Fox

Single by George Fox

from the album With All My Might
- Released: 1989
- Genre: Country
- Length: 3:51
- Label: WEA
- Songwriter: George Fox

George Fox singles chronology
"Goldmine" (1989)	"No Trespassing" (1989)	"Bachelor Girl" (1990)

"No Trespassing" is a song recorded by Canadian country music artist George Fox. Released in 1989 as the first single from his second studio album, With All My Might, it peaked at number 10 on the RPM Country Tracks chart in February 1990.

Chart (1989–90)	Peak position
Canada Country Singles (RPM)	10
