= Spice of Life (George Fox album) =

Studio album by George Fox
- Released: May 28, 1991
- Genre: Country
- Length: 31:18
- Label: Warner Music Canada
- Producer: Garth Fundis

George Fox chronology
| With All My Might (1989) | Spice of Life (1991) | Mustang Heart (1993) |

Professional ratings
Review scores
| Source | Rating |
|---|---|
| Allmusic | 2.5/5 stars |

Spice of Life is the third studio album by Canadian country music artist George Fox. It was released by Warner Music Canada on May 28, 1991. The album peaked at number 23 on the RPM Country Albums chart.

== Track listing ==
| No. | Title | Writer(s) | Length |
|---|---|---|---|
| 1. | "There Goes My Love" | Buck Owens | 2:10 |
| 2. | "Fell in Love and I Can't Get Out" | Jan Dowling, Mike Dowling | 4:04 |
| 3. | "Only the Best" | Jim Rooney | 4:12 |
| 4. | "I Know Where You Go" | Roger Ferris | 3:59 |
| 5. | "It Don't Really Matter Why" | Charlie Black, George Fox, Rory Bourke | 2:51 |
| 6. | "Wastin' Time" | Bill Caswell, Bruce Burch | 3:02 |
| 7. | "Everything About You" | Harry Stinson, Kostas | 3:23 |
| 8. | "Here Today, Here Tomorrow" | Bob DiPiero, George Fox, John Scott Sherrill | 3:19 |
| 9. | "Spice of Life" | George Fox | 3:27 |
| 10. | "I Surrender" | Bob DiPiero, George Fox | 2:58 |

== Personnel ==
- Ted Alexander - keyboards
- Sam Bacco - percussion
- Stuart Duncan - fiddle
- Paul Franklin - lap steel guitar
- Garth Fundis - backing vocals
- John Gardner - drums
- Rob Hajacos - fiddle
- Jelly Roll Johnson - harmonica
- Jerry Martin - acoustic guitar, electric guitar
- Brent Mason - guitar
- Russ Pahl - steel guitar, electric guitar, acoustic guitar
- Dave Pomeroy - bass guitar, electric upright bass
- Matt Rollings - piano
- John Wesley Ryles - backing vocals
- Pete Wasner - keyboards
- Biff Watson - acoustic guitar
- Dennis Wilson - backing vocals

== Chart performance ==
| Chart (1991) | Peak position |
|---|---|
| Canadian RPM Country Albums | 23 |
