= Lime Rickey (song) =

Single by George Fox

from the album With All My Might
- Released: 1990
- Genre: Country
- Length: 2:46
- Label: WEA
- Songwriter: George Fox

George Fox singles chronology
"Bachelor Girl" (1989)	"Lime Rickey" (1990)	"With All My Might" (1990)

"Lime Rickey" is a song recorded by Canadian country music artist George Fox. It was released in 1990 as the third single from his second studio album, With All My Might. It peaked at number 10 on the RPM Country Tracks chart in August 1990.

== Chart performance ==
Chart (1990)	Peak position
Canada Country Singles (RPM)	10
