= Way Out Here (song) =

Single by Josh Thompson

from the album Way Out Here
- Released: March 29, 2010
- Genre: Country
- Length: 4:06
- Label: Columbia Nashville
- Songwriters: Josh Thompson; David Lee Murphy; Casey Beathard
- Producer: Michael Knox

Josh Thompson singles chronology
"Beer on the Table" (2009)	"Way Out Here" (2010)	"Won't Be Lonely Long" (2010)

Music video
- "Way Out Here" on YouTube

"Way Out Here" is a song co-written and recorded by American country music singer Josh Thompson. It was released in March 2010 as the second single and title track from his debut album of the same name. Thompson co-wrote the song with David Lee Murphy and Casey Beathard.

== Content ==
"Way Out Here" is a ballad, mostly accompanied by acoustic guitar. In it, the narrator tells of his rural upbringing, the way he was raised, and his desire for the United States to return to a simpler time, back when things "were run the way they ought a be". The song further laments small town America, stating with nostalgia images of pickup trucks, unlicensed dogs running free, and hard working blue-collar men who "chew and fry everything". A further narrative relates to service in the United States Armed Forces, of which the narrator tells how people from small town America often wind up joining the military to earn a living and are then deployed overseas.

== Music video ==
The music video for "Way Out Here" was filmed in Cairo, Illinois. The video begins with scenes of farms, a diner run by a young woman in her late teens (apparently married with a wedding ring and also religious locket which reads "faith") then shifts to a local bar where the narrator sings the song on his guitar. Interspersed into the video are scenes of men working on a farm as well as scenes of young men deployed in the Army to the Middle East.

== Critical reception ==
The song and video drew mostly positive reviews from critics, however some negative reviews resulted from the portrayal in the music video of an entirely white town (Cairo, Illinois is in fact 70% African American), as well as nostalgia (instead of concern) regarding boarded up small towns steeped in rural poverty. Paul Brian of Engine 145, gave the song a thumbs-down rating. His review criticized Thompson's vocals for "[simmering] with anger, despair, and moral force as the song approaches numerous key concerns including the economy, military service, work ethic, religious belief, gun ownership, governance, and musical taste".

Riley Green recorded a cover of the song and named his 2024 EP Way Out Here after it.

== Chart performance ==
"Way Out Here" debuted at number 57 on the Hot Country Songs chart dated March 20, 2010, and then fell off the next week. However, it re-entered the country chart at number 58 on the chart dated April 3, 2010. In September 2010, it peaked at number 15 on the chart.

Chart (2010)	Peak position
US Hot Country Songs (Billboard)	15
US Billboard Hot 100	85

=== Year-end charts ===
Chart (2010)	Position
US Country Songs (Billboard)	58
