= Loco (David Lee Murphy song) =

Single by David Lee Murphy

from the album Tryin' to Get There
- Released: January 5, 2004
- Genre: Country
- Length: 3:07
- Label: Audium/Koch
- Songwriters: David Lee Murphy; Kim Tribble
- Producers: David Lee Murphy; Kim Tribble

David Lee Murphy singles chronology
"We Can't All Be Angels" (1998)	"Loco" (2004)	"Inspiration" (2004)

"Loco" is a song co-written and recorded by American country music artist David Lee Murphy. It was released in January 2004 as the first single from Murphy's album, Tryin' to Get There. The song reached number 5 on the Billboard Hot Country Singles & Tracks chart in July 2004. It was also Murphy's first entry on the Billboard Hot 100, peaking at number 44. The song was written by Murphy and Kim Tribble.

== Critical reception ==
Deborah Evans Price, of Billboard magazine reviewed the song favorably, calling it a "frisky, uptempo number about the joys about being a little bit crazy." She goes on to say that "saucy fiddle and infectious lead-guitar work add spice to this fun tune." She praises Murphy, stating that he remains an "engaging vocalist who knows how to put just the right touch on a light-hearted lyric."

== Chart performance ==
"Loco" debuted at number 59 on the U.S. Billboard Hot Country Singles & Tracks for the week of January 17, 2004.

Chart (2004)	Peak position
US Hot Country Songs (Billboard)	5
US Billboard Hot 100	44

=== Year-end charts ===
Chart (2004)	Position
US Country Songs (Billboard)	32
