= The Road You Leave Behind =

Single by David Lee Murphy

from the album Gettin' Out the Good Stuff
- B-side: "Gettin' Out the Good Stuff"
- Released: July 22, 1996
- Genre: Country
- Length: 3:53
- Label: MCA
- Songwriter: David Lee Murphy
- Producer: Tony Brown

David Lee Murphy singles chronology
"Every Time I Get Around You" (1996)	"The Road You Leave Behind" (1996)	"She's Really Something To See" (1996)

"The Road You Leave Behind" is a song written and recorded by American country music artist David Lee Murphy. It was released in July 1996 as the second single from his album Gettin' Out the Good Stuff. The song peaked at number 5 on the U.S. Billboard Hot Country Singles & Tracks chart and number 12 on the Canadian RPM Country Tracks chart.

== Content ==
Murphy described the song as "a real good kind of 'do the right thing' song," saying that its subject matter made it different from the content of his first album.

== Critical reception ==
Larry Flick, of Billboard magazine reviewed the song favorably calling it "one of those philosophical life-lesson kinds of songs, but Murphy's vocal honesty keeps it from sounding preachy or schmaltzy."

== Music video ==
The music video was directed by Michael Salomon and made its debut on Country Music Television on August 8, 1996.

== Chart positions ==
"The Road You Leave Behind" debuted at number 62 on the U.S. Billboard Hot Country Singles & Tracks for the week of August 3, 1996.

Chart (1996)	Peak position
Canada Country Singles (RPM)	12
US Hot Country Songs (Billboard)	5

=== Year-end charts ===
Chart (1996)	Position
US Country Songs (Billboard)	55
