= Party Crowd =

Single by David Lee Murphy

from the album Out with a Bang
- B-side: "Can't Turn It Off"
- Released: February 21, 1995
- Recorded: 1994
- Genre: Country
- Length: 3:18
- Label: MCA
- Songwriters: Jimbeau Hinson; David Lee Murphy
- Producer: Tony Brown

David Lee Murphy singles chronology
"Fish Ain't Bitin'" (1994)	"Party Crowd" (1995)	"Dust on the Bottle" (1995)

"Party Crowd" is a song co-written and recorded by American country music artist David Lee Murphy. It was released in February 1995 as the third single from his debut album Out with a Bang. It peaked at number 6 in the United States, and number 7 in Canada, thus becoming his first top ten hit. The song was written by Murphy and Jimbeau Hinson.

== Content ==
The song is an uptempo, in which the narrator talks about how his lover just broke up with him, though she could not help but cry while doing so. Having told her not to worry about him "for the sake of her feelings and the sake of [his] pride," he goes on to say that he is "looking for a party crowd" to forget all of his troubles.

== Critical reception ==
Billboard magazine reviewed the song unfavorably, saying that while Murphy is a fine writer and singer, he "seems intent on downplaying these attributes by releasing rowdy-but-flimsy singles like this." and "a little more muscle in the songwriting department might better show off this guy."

== Music video ==
The music video was directed by Chris Rogers. Filmed in Austin, TX, it features Murphy as a street performer playing for tips with his band after not being able to find an open bar (as mentioned in the song). In the end, he simply walks away.

== Chart positions ==
"Party Crowd" debuted at number 67 on the U.S. Billboard Hot Country Singles & Tracks for the week of March 18, 1995.

Chart (1995)	Peak position
Canada Country Singles (RPM)	7
US Hot Country Songs (Billboard)	6

=== Year-end charts ===
Chart (1995)	Position
Canada Country Tracks (RPM)	81
US Country Songs (Billboard)	31
