= Goldmine (George Fox song) =

Single by George Fox

from the album George Fox
- Released: 1989
- Genre: Country
- Length: 3:58
- Label: WEA
- Songwriter: George Fox

George Fox singles chronology
"RBJ" (1989)	"Goldmine" (1989)	"No Trespassing" (1989)

"Goldmine" is a song recorded by Canadian country music artist George Fox. It was released in 1989 as the fourth single from his debut album, George Fox. It peaked at number 9 on the RPM Country Tracks chart in August 1989.

== Chart performance ==
Chart (1989)	Peak position
Canada Country Singles (RPM)	9

=== Year-end charts ===
Chart (1989)	Position
Canada Country Tracks (RPM)	91
