= Josh Thompson (singer) =

American country singer (born 1978)

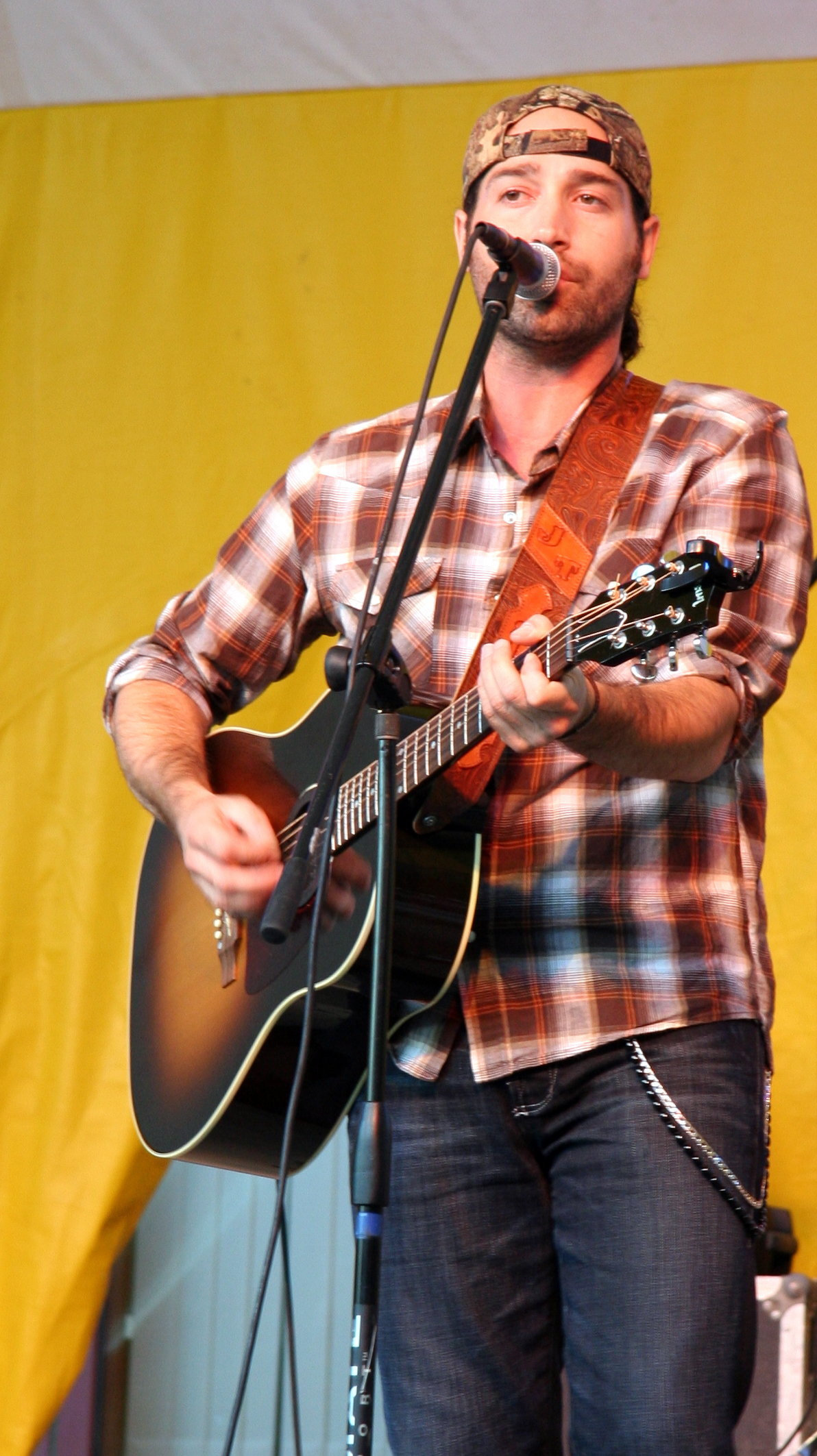
- Thompson in 2010

Background information
- Born: January 23, 1978 (age 48)
- Origin: Cedarburg, Wisconsin, U.S.
- Genre: Country
- Occupation: Singer-songwriter
- Instruments: Vocals; guitar
- Years active: 2005–present
- Labels: Columbia Nashville; RCA Nashville; Show Dog-Universal Music

Josh Thompson (born January 23, 1978) is an American country music singer and songwriter. He has released two studio albums: Way Out Here for Columbia Records Nashville, and Turn It Up for Show Dog-Universal Music, and has charted six singles on Hot Country Songs and/or Country Airplay, the highest-peaking being "Way Out Here" at No. 15. Thompson has also written songs for Jason Aldean, Blake Shelton, Justin Moore, Brad Paisley, Brett Young, Morgan Wallen and Darius Rucker.

== Early life ==
Thompson was born in Cedarburg, Wisconsin. He worked in construction starting at age twelve. As a young adult, he took a nature course in the Nicolet National Forest.

== Career ==
=== 2009–2012: Way Out Here and Change ===
Thompson moved to Nashville, Tennessee in 2005. He worked as a songwriter, with his first cut being the title track to Jason Michael Carroll's album Growing Up Is Getting Old. By 2009, Thompson had signed to Columbia Records' Nashville division. He released his debut single "Beer on the Table" in late 2009, and it debuted at No. 55 on the Billboard Hot Country Songs charts dated for the week ending August 15, 2009. This song was followed by a four-song digital extended play which included that song and three other tracks.

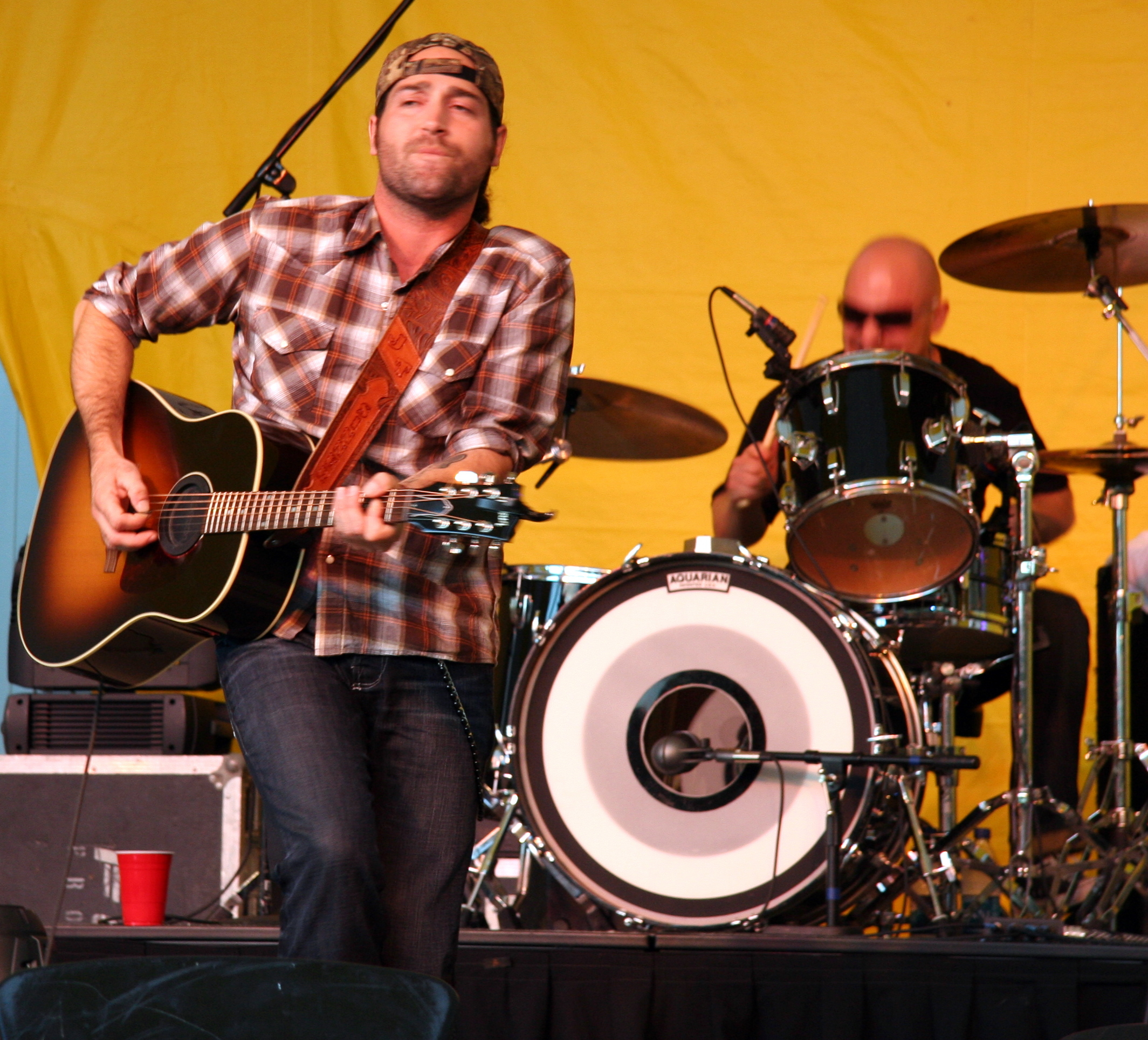
Thompson performing in Minnesota in 2010

Way Out Here, his debut album, was released in February 2010 under the production of Michael Knox. Thompson wrote or co-wrote every one of the album's ten tracks, and promoted the album at the Northern Lights Theatre in Milwaukee, Wisconsin.

"Beer on the Table" peaked at number 17 on the country music charts. The album's second single, its title track, was released to radio in March 2010. Besides the two singles, the tracks "Won't Be Lonely Long" and "Blame It on Waylon" were made into music videos. Starting in February 2010, Thompson began touring with Eric Church on a 32-stop tour and was tapped for portions of Brad Paisley's 2010 H2O Tour. The album's third single "Won't Be Lonely Long" released to country radio on November 22, 2010. Thompson also co-wrote "Church Pew or Bar Stool", a song recorded by Jason Aldean on his 2010 album My Kinda Party. In 2011 he co-wrote a song on Brad Paisley's album This Is Country Music the song is entitled "A Man Don't Have to Die".

In August 2011, Thompson and labelmate Miranda Lambert transferred to RCA Nashville as part of a corporate restructuring. He released his first RCA Records single, "Comin' Around", in late 2011. However, Thompson parted ways with RCA Nashville in July 2012.

=== 2013–present: Turn It Up ===
In September 2012 it was announced that Thompson had signed a recording contract with Show Dog-Universal Music and will release new music sometime in 2013. Also in 2013, he co-wrote James Wesley's single "Thank a Farmer" with Dustin Lynch and Steve Bogard.

His first Show Dog single, "Cold Beer with Your Name on It", entered the charts in late 2013 and reached Top 30 on Country Airplay. It is the lead single from his first Show Dog-Universal album, Turn It Up. The album's second single "Wanted Me Gone" was released on April 28, 2014. Thompson parted ways with Show Dog in 2015.

Thompson announced in August 2015 that he would be releasing his unreleased second album for RCA as a pair of extended plays. The first of the two, Change: The Lost Record, Vol. 1, was released in October. Thompson, along with Deric Ruttan, co-wrote Jason Aldean's number one hit Any Ol' Barstool.

== Discography ==
=== Studio albums ===
Title	Album details	Peak chart positions		Sales
Title	Album details	US Country	US	Sales
Way Out Here	Release date: February 23, 2010; Label: Columbia Nashville; Formats: CD, music download	9	28	US: 152,000
Turn It Up	Release date: April 1, 2014; Label: Show Dog-Universal Music; Formats: CD, music download	7	36	US: 25,000
Change: The Lost Record	Release date: April 21, 2017; Label: Ole; Formats: music download	—	—	
"—" denotes releases that did not chart

=== Extended plays ===
Title	Album details	Peak chart positions		Sales
Title	Album details	US Country	US Indie	Sales
Change: The Lost Record Vol. 1	Release date: October 9, 2015; Label: Ole; Formats: music download	20	37	US: 1,900

=== Singles ===
Year	Single	Peak chart positions				Certifications	Album
Year	Single	US Country	US Country Airplay	US	CAN	Certifications	Album
2009	"Beer on the Table"	17		—^{A}	—		Way Out Here
2010	"Way Out Here"	15		85	—	US: Gold	Way Out Here
2010	"Won't Be Lonely Long"	25		—	—		Way Out Here
2011	"Comin' Around"	31		—	—		Change: The Lost Record
2013	"Cold Beer with Your Name on It"	32	27	—	88		Turn It Up
2014	"Wanted Me Gone"	—	44	—	—		Turn It Up
2017	"Daddy Had a Beer"	—	—	—	—		Change: The Lost Record
"—" denotes releases that did not chart

- ^{A} "Beer on the Table" did not enter the Hot 100, but peaked at number 3 on Bubbling Under Hot 100 Singles.

=== Guest singles ===
Year	Single	Artist	Album
2015	"Tonight on Repeat"	The Lacs	Outlaw in Me

=== Other charted songs ===
Year	Single	Peak positions	Album
Year	Single	US Country	Album
2011	"Change"	47	Change: The Lost Record

=== Music videos ===
Year	Video	Director
2009	"Beer on the Table"	Wes Edwards
2009	"Won't Be Lonely Long" (acoustic version)	
2009	"Sinner"	
2010	"Blame It on Waylon"	Wes Edwards
2010	"Way Out Here" (acoustic version)	Wes Edwards
2010	"Way Out Here" (album version)	Darren Doane
2011	"Won't Be Lonely Long" (album version)	Wes Edwards
2012	"Comin' Around"	P. R. Brown
2014	"Cold Beer with Your Name on It"	Chris Hicky
2014	"Wanted Me Gone"	Tom Dyer
2015	"Tonight on Repeat" (with The Lacs)	Fab 5 Freddy
