= Dust on the Bottle =

Single by David Lee Murphy

from the album Out with a Bang
- B-side: "Mama 'n Them"
- Released: August 7, 1995
- Recorded: 1994
- Genre: Country
- Length: 3:44
- Label: MCA
- Songwriter: David Lee Murphy
- Producer: Tony Brown

David Lee Murphy singles chronology
"Party Crowd" (1995)	"Dust on the Bottle" (1995)	"Out with a Bang" (1995)

"Dust on the Bottle" is a song written and recorded by American country music artist David Lee Murphy. It was released in August 1995 as the fourth single from the album Out with a Bang. The song hit number one on the Billboard Hot Country Singles & Tracks in late 1995, and is Murphy's first number one hit. It would remain his only number one single until almost 23 years later, when he topped the country charts again with "Everything's Gonna Be Alright" in June 2018. The song also hit number 9 on the Canadian Country charts.

== Background and writing ==
In an interview with The Boot, Murphy said that he was playing guitar at his kitchen table in the morning and the song "came out of nowhere." Murphy goes on to say that he wrote the song in 15 minutes.

== Content ==
The song is about an old man named Creole Williams. The narrator asks him for advice on impressing his lover, and Williams gives him a bottle of homemade wine, then tells him "There might be a little dust on the bottle / But don’t let it fool ya about what’s inside/There might be a little dust on the bottle/But it’s one of those things, it gets sweeter with time”.

== Music video ==
The music video was directed by Charley Randazzo and premiered in mid-1995.

== Other versions ==
Jason Aldean re-recorded the song as a duet with Murphy on his 2026 album Songs About Us.

== Chart positions ==
"Dust on the Bottle" debuted at number 72 on the U.S. Billboard Hot Country Singles & Tracks for the week of August 12, 1995.

Chart (1995)	Peak position
Canada Country Singles (RPM)	9
US Hot Country Songs (Billboard)	1

=== Year-end charts ===
Chart (1995)	Position
US Country Songs (Billboard)	37

== Certifications ==
Region	Certification	Certified units/sales
United States (RIAA)	Platinum	1,000,000^{‡}
^{‡} Sales+streaming figures based on certification alone.
