= Out with a Bang (David Lee Murphy song) =

Single by David Lee Murphy

from the album Out with a Bang
- B-side: "Greatest Show on Earth"
- Released: November 13, 1995
- Genre: Country
- Length: 2:28
- Label: MCA
- Songwriters: David Lee Murphy; Kim Tribble
- Producer: Tony Brown

David Lee Murphy singles chronology
"Dust on the Bottle" (1995)	"Out with a Bang" (1995)	"Every Time I Get Around You" (1996)

"Out with a Bang" is a song co-written and recorded by American country music artist David Lee Murphy. It was released in November 1995 as the fifth and final single and title track from his album Out with a Bang. The song peaked at number 13 on the U.S. country charts and peaked at number 5 on the Canadian country charts. It was written by Murphy and Kim Tribble.

== Critical reception ==
Larry Flick, of Billboard magazine reviewed the song favorably calling it an "uptempo ode to goodtimes." He goes on to say that Murphy has a "distinctive voice and unique phasing that never gets lost in the production."

== Chart positions ==
"Out with a Bang" debuted at number 70 on the U.S. Billboard Hot Country Singles & Tracks for the week of November 25, 1995.

Chart (1995–1996)	Peak position
Canada Country Singles (RPM)	5
US Hot Country Songs (Billboard)	13

=== Year-end charts ===
Chart (1996)	Position
Canada Country Tracks (RPM)	56
