= David Lee Murphy =

American singer-songwriter

- Born: January 7, 1959 (age 67); Herrin, Illinois, United States
- Origin: Herrin, Illinois, United States
- Genre: Country
- Occupations: Singer; songwriter
- Instruments: Vocals; acoustic guitar
- Years active: 1983–present
- Labels: MCA; Audium; Old Desperados; Reviver
- Website: davidlee.com

David Lee Murphy (born January 7, 1959) is an American country music singer and songwriter. He is best known for his No. 1 country hits "Dust on the Bottle" and "Everything's Gonna Be Alright", as well as the hit songs "Party Crowd", "Out with a Bang", "Every Time I Get Around You", "The Road You Leave Behind", and "Loco". He has released five solo studio albums: Out with a Bang (1994), Gettin' Out the Good Stuff (1996), We Can't All Be Angels (1997), Tryin' to Get There (2004), and No Zip Code (2018). His songs "Just Once" and "We Can't All Be Angels" appeared on the soundtracks of the films 8 Seconds (1994) and Black Dog (1998), respectively.

Murphy took a hiatus from recording in 2004, and has co-written several singles for other artists, including the hits "Living in Fast Forward" for Kenny Chesney, "Anywhere With You" for Jake Owen, "Big Green Tractor" for Jason Aldean, and "Are You Gonna Kiss Me or Not" for Thompson Square. On April 6, 2018, Murphy and Kenny Chesney released a studio album together, No Zip Code, which features their hit song "Everything's Gonna Be Alright".

== Biography ==
Murphy was born in Herrin, Illinois, the son of Jessie (West) and Dr. Jack Murphy. His father died from a heart attack on December 17, 1982, when Murphy was 23. By 1983, he had moved to Nashville, Tennessee, seeking a career in country music. Two years later, he was spotted by record producer Tony Brown at a club in Nashville, although Brown did not sign Murphy to a record deal until nearly a decade later. In the meantime, however, Murphy did co-write album cuts for Reba McEntire and Doug Stone.

== Musical career ==
Murphy's first recording for MCA Nashville was the song "Just Once", which was included on the soundtrack to the 1994 film 8 Seconds. In 1994, "Just Once" entered the Billboard Hot Country Singles & Tracks chart, reaching No. 36. The same year, Murphy began work on his debut album Out with a Bang, released in early 1995. The album produced three hit singles overall, including "Party Crowd," which became the most-played country song of 1995, as well as "Dust on the Bottle", a No. 1 single. Out with a Bang became the best-selling album for a new male country act in 1995 and was certified gold by the RIAA.

Gettin' Out the Good Stuff was the title of Murphy's second album, released in 1996. It produced back-to-back Top 5 singles in "Every Time I Get Around You" and "The Road You Leave Behind". "Every Time I Get Around You" hit No. 2 on the RPM Country Tracks in Canada and was named that publication's top song for 1996.

Murphy's third and final album for MCA, titled We Can't All Be Angels, was released in 1997. In a 1997 interview, Murphy revealed that he had intended for this album to be experimental in nature, saying that he "wanted to create just a whole different tone, sonically. I just wanted a different sounding record." We Can't All Be Angels had two singles, "All Lit up in Love" and "Just Don't Wait Around 'Til She's Leavin'", peaking at No. 25 and No. 37 on the country chart.

=== 2000s ===
By the 2000s, Murphy had shifted his focus to songwriting. One of his first cuts in the 2000s was the title track to Aaron Tippin's 2000 album People Like Us; this song was a Top 20 for Tippin in 2001. Trick Pony also entered the country Top 20 a year later with another one of Murphy's compositions — the title track to their 2002 album On a Mission. Murphy also co-wrote album cuts for several other artists, including Brooks & Dunn, Montgomery Gentry, and Hank Williams, Jr.

Koch Entertainment signed Murphy to his second recording contract in 2004. That year, he released his fourth studio album, Tryin' to Get There. The album, whose title track was co-written by Waylon Jennings prior to his death in 2002, produced the Top Five hit "Loco", which reached No. 5 in 2004. The only other single from Tryin' to Get There was "Inspiration", a collaboration with singer and guitarist Lee Roy Parnell, which peaked at No. 48.

Following the closure of the Koch Nashville record label, Murphy continued working as a songwriter, scoring his first outside Number One with Kenny Chesney's 2006 single "Living in Fast Forward". 2007 produced three more chart singles co-written by Murphy: Gary Allan's "A Feelin' Like That" (co-written by Ira Dean, then a member of Trick Pony), Van Zant's "Goes Down Easy", and Blake Shelton's "The More I Drink". 2008 saw the release of Keith Anderson's "Somebody Needs a Hug" and the Eli Young Band's "Always the Love Songs", two more songs co-written by Murphy, and Jason Aldean topped the country charts in September 2009 with "Big Green Tractor", which Murphy wrote with Jim Collins. Josh Thompson charted in 2010 with "Way Out Here", another Murphy co-write.

Other Murphy co-writes include Thompson Square's "Are You Gonna Kiss Me or Not" and "Everything I Shouldn't Be Thinking About", Kenny Chesney's "Live a Little", "Pirate Flag", and "Bar at the End of the World", Aldean's "The Only Way I Know", Jake Owen's "Anywhere with You", Blackberry Smoke's "Ain't Much Left of Me", and The Road Hammers' "Get On Down the Road".

In 2017, Murphy signed to Reviver Records and announced that he would release a new album, No Zip Code. The album is produced by Kenny Chesney and Buddy Cannon, Chesney's longtime producer.

== Charitable efforts ==
In 2000, Murphy hosted a series of concerts in his hometown of Herrin, Illinois, raising $25,000 for the Jack Murphy fund, which David Lee started in honor of his father, Dr. Jack Murphy, a local civic leader and educator.

== Discography ==
- Out with a Bang (1994)
- Gettin' Out the Good Stuff (1996)
- We Can't All Be Angels (1998)
- Tryin' to Get There (2004)
- No Zip Code (2018)

== See also ==
- List of songs written by David Lee Murphy

== Awards and nominations ==
Year	Ceremony	Category	Recipient/Work	Result	Ref
1996	Academy of Country Music Awards	Top New Male Vocalist	N/A	Nominated	

Year	Ceremony	Category	Recipient/Work	Result	Ref
2012	Grammy Awards	Best Country Song	Are You Gonna Kiss Me or Not with Jim Collins	Nominated	

Year	Ceremony	Category	Recipient/Work	Result	Ref
2018	Country Music Association Awards	Musical Event of the Year	"Everything's Gonna Be Alright" with Kenny Chesney	Won	
