= Kim Tribble =

American country music songwriter

- Born: Kim Chadwick Tribble; November 14, 1951; Muscle Shoals, Alabama
- Origin: Nashville, Tennessee
- Died: August 26, 2021 (aged 69) Nashville, Tennessee
- Genre: Country
- Occupation: Songwriter
- Years active: 1993-2021

Kim Chadwick Tribble (November 14, 1951-August 26, 2021) was an American country music songwriter.

== Career ==
Active since the mid-1990s, he has written for David Lee Murphy, Montgomery Gentry, Doug Stone, and others. Two songs written by Tribble, "Guys Do It All the Time" by Mindy McCready and "I Can Still Feel You" by Collin Raye, have made number 1 on the Hot Country Songs charts. Tribble signed with SESAC in 2008.

Tribble was a frequent collaborator of David Lee Murphy, having written songs on all of his albums.

== Death ==
Tribble died at age 69 in Nashville, Tennessee, following complications of dementia with Lewy bodies.

== List of songs written by Kim Tribble ==
| Year | Single Title | Recording Artist | Co-writer | Chart Positions |
| Year | Single Title | Recording Artist | Co-writer | Billboard Country |
|---|---|---|---|---|
| 1993 | "Drive Time" | Lisa Stewart | Annette Cotter | 72 |
| 1994 | "Addicted to a Dollar" | Doug Stone | Ray Hood, Doug Stone, Ray Maddox | 4 |
| 1994 | "Just Once" | David Lee Murphy | David Lee Murphy | 36 |
| 1995 | "Out with a Bang" | David Lee Murphy | David Lee Murphy | 13 |
| 1996 | "In Your Face" | Ty Herndon | Annette Cotter | 63 |
| 1996 | "Guys Do It All the Time" | Mindy McCready | Bobby Whiteside | 1 |
| 1997 | "Breakfast in Birmingham" | David Lee Murphy | David Lee Murphy | 51 |
| 1997 | "The Kind of Heart That Breaks" | Chris Cummings | Chris Cummings, Phillip Douglas | 50 |
| 1998 | "For Lack of Better Words" | Restless Heart | Joie Scott | 64 |
| 1998 | "I Can Still Feel You" | Collin Raye | Tammy Hyler | 1 |
| 2001 | "It's My Time" | Martina McBride | Tammy Hyler, Billy Crain | 11 |
| 2001 | "People Like Us" | Aaron Tippin | David Lee Murphy | 17 |
| 2002 | "On a Mission" | Trick Pony | David Lee Murphy | 19 |
| 2004 | "Loco" | David Lee Murphy | David Lee Murphy | 5 |
| 2005 | "Shoes" | Shania Twain | Tammy Hyler, Joie Scott, Shania Twain, Robert John "Mutt" Lange | 29 |
| 2007 | "A Feelin' Like That" | Gary Allan | David Lee Murphy, Ira Dean | 12 |
| 2009 | "One in Every Crowd" | Montgomery Gentry | Eddie Montgomery, Ira Dean | 5 |
| 2009 | "Long Line of Losers" | Montgomery Gentry | Kevin Fowler | 23 |
| 2009 | "Whistlin' Dixie" | Randy Houser | Randy Houser | 31 |
| 2013 | "Let There Be Cowgirls" | Chris Cagle | Chris Cagle | 16 |
