= Danny Rader =

American musician

Danny Rader (born November 1, 1981) is a musician from Panama City, Florida. Born into a musical family, he began to play drums at age 2 and branched out into bass, guitar and piano in his early teens. Later he incorporated bouzouki, mandolin, banjo, mandola, keyboards, accordion, melodica, and harmonica into his skill set.

Rader, along with the rest of his family, performed in The Ocean Opry Music Show in Panama City Beach, Florida, which operated from 1978-2005. With his family Rader performed over 200 shows a year, until moving to Nashville in 2004.

Rader has toured with Jason Aldean, LeAnn Rimes, Gretchen Wilson, Carolyn Dawn Johnson, Julianne Hough, and Keith Urban. In 2022, he joined Kenny Chesney's touring band.

He has appeared on The Grammy Awards, The Tonight Show with Jay Leno, Late Night with David Letterman, The Today Show, Good Morning America, Country Music Television Awards and The Billboard Music Awards, among other TV appearances.

In 2014, Danny was nominated for the Academy of Country Music's "Specialty Musician of the Year" award. In 2016, Danny won the Academy of Country Music's "Specialty Musician of the Year" award.
