= Brantley Gilbert discography =

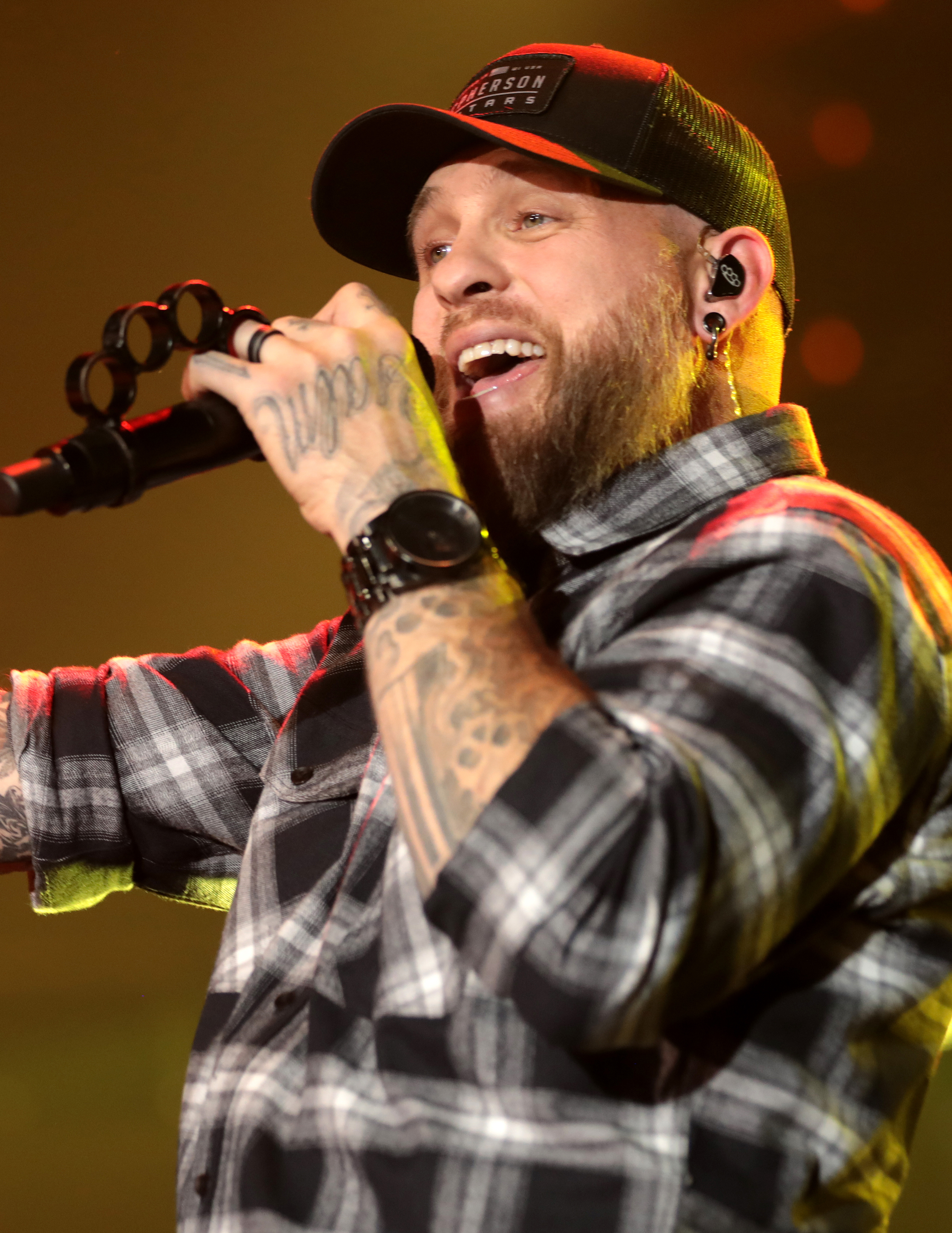
- Studio albums: 8
- Singles: 17
- Music videos: 14
- Other charted songs: 9
- No. 1 singles: 5

Brantley Gilbert is an American country music artist. His discography consists of eight studio albums—A Modern Day Prodigal Son (2009), Halfway to Heaven (2010), Just As I Am (2014), The Devil Don't Sleep (2017), Fire & Brimstone (2019), So Help Me God (2022), Tattoos (2024), and Sins of the Father (2026). He has also released a total of 17 singles, 5 of which hit number one on the US Country Airplay chart.

== Studio albums ==
Title	Details	Peak chart positions						Certifications	Sales
Title	Details	US	US Country	US Heat	US Indie	AUS	CAN	Certifications	Sales
A Modern Day Prodigal Son	Release date: October 27, 2009; Label: Average Joes, Valory (re-issue); Formats: CD, digital download	38	58	41	—	—	—		
Halfway to Heaven	Release date: March 16, 2010; Label: Average Joes, Valory (re-issue); Formats: CD, digital download	4	2	1	13	—	—	RIAA: Platinum	US: 1,081,000
Just As I Am	Release date: May 19, 2014; Label: Valory; Formats: CD, digital download	2	1	—	—	—	8	RIAA: Platinum	US: 1,021,400
The Devil Don't Sleep	Release date: January 27, 2017; Label: Valory; Formats: CD, digital download	2	1	—	—	34	5	RIAA: Gold	US: 218,200
Fire & Brimstone	Release date: October 4, 2019; Label: Valory; Formats: CD, vinyl, digital download, streaming	9	1	—	—	85	26		US: 70,300
So Help Me God	Release date: November 10, 2022; Label: Valory; Formats: CD, vinyl, digital download, streaming	—	35	—	44	—	—		
Tattoos	Release date: September 13, 2024; Label: Valory; Formats: CD, vinyl, digital download, streaming	—	42	—	—	—	—		
Sins of the Father	Release date: July 24, 2026; Label: Wheelhouse; Formats: CD, vinyl, digital download, streaming	—	—	—	—	—	—		
"—" denotes releases that did not chart

=== Compilation albums ===
Title	Album details
Read Me My Rights	Release date: March 16, 2015; Label: Valory; Format: CD, digital download
Greatest Hits...So Far	Release date: December 12, 2025; Label: Valory; Format: CD, digital download

== Singles ==
Year	Title	Peak chart positions					Certifications	Sales	Album
Year	Title	US	US Country Songs	US Country Airplay	CAN	CAN Country	Certifications	Sales	Album
2010	"Kick It in the Sticks"	—	—		—	—	RIAA: 2× Platinum		Halfway to Heaven
2010	"My Kind of Crazy"	—	—		—	—	RIAA: Platinum		Halfway to Heaven
2011	"Them Boys"	—	—		—	—			Halfway to Heaven
2011	"Country Must Be Country Wide"	50	1		91	7	RIAA: 2× Platinum	US: 1,000,000	Halfway to Heaven
2011	"You Don't Know Her Like I Do"	49	1		73	6	RIAA: 2× Platinum	US: 999,000	Halfway to Heaven
2012	"Kick It in the Sticks" (re-release)	—^{A}	29	34	—	—	RIAA: 2× Platinum		Halfway to Heaven
2012	"More Than Miles"	73	21	7	—	33	RIAA: Gold		Halfway to Heaven
2013	"Bottoms Up"	20	1	1	41	3	RIAA: 7× Platinum; RMNZ: Gold	US: 1,762,000	Just as I Am
2014	"Small Town Throwdown" (featuring Justin Moore and Thomas Rhett)	67	13	8	97	24	RIAA: Gold	US: 417,000	Just as I Am
2014	"One Hell of an Amen"	44	5	1	88	16	RIAA: 2× Platinum	US: 428,000	Just as I Am
2015	"Stone Cold Sober"	—^{B}	23	18	—	49	RIAA: Gold	US: 172,000	Just as I Am
2016	"The Weekend"	64	9	7	—	18	RIAA: 2× Platinum	US: 303,000	The Devil Don't Sleep
2017	"The Ones That Like Me"	—^{C}	22	15	—	38			The Devil Don't Sleep
2019	"What Happens in a Small Town" (with Lindsay Ell)	53	7	1	— (Note: "What Happens in a Small Town" did not enter the Canadian Hot 100, but peaked at number 39 on the Canadian Digital Song Sales component chart.)	15	RIAA: Platinum		Fire & Brimstone
2019	"Fire't Up"	—	—	44	—	—			Fire & Brimstone
2020	"Hard Days"	95	27	27	—	—	RIAA: Gold		Fire & Brimstone
2021	"The Worst Country Song of All Time" (featuring Hardy and Toby Keith)	—	31	32	—	—			So Help Me God
2022	"Heaven by Then" (featuring Blake Shelton and Vince Gill)	—	—	29	—	—			So Help Me God
2024	"Over When We're Sober" (featuring Ashley Cooke)	—	—	31	—	—			Tattoos
2025	"Want You Back"	—	—	48	—	—			Greatest Hits...So Far
2026	"Good Damn"	—	—	29	—	—			Sins of the Father
"—" denotes releases that did not chart

- ^{A} "Kick It in the Sticks" did not enter the Hot 100, but charted at number 13 on Bubbling Under Hot 100, which acts as a 25-space extension of the Hot 100.
- ^{B} "Stone Cold Sober" did not enter the Hot 100, but charted at number 8 on the Bubbling Under Hot 100, which acts as a 25-space extension of the Hot 100.
- ^{C} "The Ones That Like Me" did not enter the Hot 100, but charted at number 16 on Bubbling Under Hot 100, which acts as a 25-space extension of the Hot 100.

=== Featured singles ===
Year	Title	Artist	Peak positions				Certifications	Album
Year	Title	Artist	US	US Main Rock	US Rock	CAN Rock	Certifications	Album
2019	"Blue on Black" (with Kenny Wayne Shepherd and Brian May)	Five Finger Death Punch	66	1	2	6	RIAA: Platinum	And Justice for None
2020	"Maybe It's Time" (with Joe Elliott, Ivan Moody, Slash, Corey Taylor, Awolnation and Tommy Vext)	Sixx:A.M.	—	12	—	—		Sno Babies
2025	"Muddy Water Rockstar" (Austin Snell featuring Brantley Gilbert)	Austin Snell	—	—	—	—		Non-album single
2025	"Small Forever"	George Birge	—	—	—	—		Non-album single
"—" denotes releases that did not chart or were not released in that territory.

=== Promotional singles ===
Year	Title	Peak chart positions	Certifications	Album
Year	Title	US Country Songs	Certifications	Album
2021	"Gone But Not Forgotten"	—		So Help Me God
2021	"How to Talk to Girls"	—		So Help Me God
2022	"Rolex on a Redneck" (with Jason Aldean)	41	RIAA: Gold	So Help Me God
2022	"Son of the Dirty South" (featuring Jelly Roll)	48	RIAA: Gold	So Help Me God
2023	"Bury Me Upside Down"	—		So Help Me God (Deluxe Edition)
2024	"Off the Rails"	—		Tattoos
2024	"Me and My House" (featuring Struggle Jennings & Demun Jones)	—		Tattoos
2024	"Dirty Money" (featuring Justin Moore)	—		Tattoos

== Other charted and certified songs ==
Year	Title	Peak chart positions			Sales	Album
Year	Title	US	US Country Songs	CAN	Sales	Album
2010	"Dirt Road Anthem" (Colt Ford featuring Brantley Gilbert)	—	—	—	RIAA: Gold	Ride Through the Country
2011	"Fall Into Me"	—	—	—	RIAA: Gold	Halfway to Heaven
2014	"My Baby's Guns N' Roses"	87	18	88		Just as I Am
2014	"17 Again"	90	19	95		Just as I Am
2014	"If You Want a Bad Boy"	—	47	—		Just as I Am
2015	"Read Me My Rights"	—	46	—		Just as I Am: Platinum Edition
2017	"Outlaw in Me"	—	45	—		The Devil Don't Sleep
2017	"Tried to Tell Ya"	—	47	—		The Devil Don't Sleep
2017	"You Could Be That Girl"	—	40	—		The Devil Don't Sleep
2019	"Not Like Us"	—	48	—		Fire & Brimstone
2019	"Welcome to Hazeville" (featuring Colt Ford, Lukas Nelson, and Willie Nelson)	—	—	—	RIAA: Gold	Fire & Brimstone
2019	"Man That Hung the Moon"	—	44	—		Fire & Brimstone
"—" denotes releases that did not chart

== Music videos ==
Year	Video	Director
2010	"Kick It in the Sticks"	Potsy Ponciroli
2010	"My Kind of Crazy"	Mason Dixon
2011	"Country Must Be Country Wide"	Shane Drake
2011	"You Don't Know Her Like I Do"	Justin Key
2012	"More Than Miles"	Shane Drake
2013	"Bottoms Up"	Shane Drake
2014	"Small Town Throwdown" (featuring Justin Moore and Thomas Rhett)	Shane Drake
2015	"One Hell of an Amen"	Shane Drake
2015	"Stone Cold Sober"	Shane Drake
2016	"The Weekend"	Shane Drake
2018	"The Ones That Like Me"	Trey Fanjoy
2019	"What Happens in a Small Town" (with Lindsay Ell)	Shaun Silva
2019	"Welcome to Hazeville" (feat. Colt Ford, Lukas Nelson, and Willie Nelson)	Chris Gregoire
2020	"Fire’t Up"	Shaun Silva
2021	"The Worst Country Song of All Time" (feat. Hardy and Toby Keith)	Brantley Gilbert and Brian K. Vaughan
