= Hard Day (disambiguation) =

"Hard Day" is a song by English singer George Michael.

Hard Day may also refer to:

- Hard Day, a 2023 Japanese drama film starring Junichi Okada
- A Hard Day, a 2014 South Korean action thriller film
- A Hard Day (2021 film), a 2021 Filipino action thriller film
- "Hard Days", a song by American country artist Brantley Gilbert
