= Halfway to Heaven (album) =

2010 album by Brantley Gilbert

Studio album by Brantley Gilbert
- Released: March 16, 2010
- Recorded: 2009–10
- Genre: Country; rock; country rock
- Length: 48:54
- Label: Average Joes
- Producer: Brantley Gilbert; The Atom Brothers; Jonathan Waggoner; Jess Franklin; Dann Huff; Phive Starr Productions

Brantley Gilbert chronology
A Modern Day Prodigal Son (2009)	Halfway to Heaven (2010)	Just as I Am (2014)

Singles from Halfway to Heaven
- 1. "Kick It in the Sticks" Released: February 22, 2010; 2. "My Kind of Crazy" Released: 2010; 3. "Them Boys" Released: January 24, 2011

Halfway to Heaven is the second studio album by American country music singer Brantley Gilbert. It was released on March 16, 2010, through Average Joes Entertainment. As of January 2015, the album has sold 1,081,200 copies. The original album was produced by Gilbert along with the Atom Brothers, Jonathan Waggoner, and Jess Franklin, except for "Country Must Be Country Wide" (produced by Dann Huff) and "Dirt Road Anthem Revisited" (produced by Phive Starr Productions).

== Track listing ==
Standard version
No.	Title	Length
1.	"Hell on Wheels"	4:17
2.	"Bending the Rules and Breaking the Law"	3:32
3.	"Back in the Day"	4:01
4.	"My Kind of Crazy"	3:42
5.	"Kick It in the Sticks"	3:49
6.	"Halfway to Heaven"	3:16
7.	"Saving Amy"	5:29
8.	"Country Must Be Country Wide"	3:39
9.	"Take It Outside"	4:22
10.	"Them Boys"	4:04
11.	"Fall into Me"	4:02
12.	"Dirt Road Anthem (Revisited) (feat. Brantley Gilbert)"	4:41

== 2011: Halfway to Heaven (Deluxe edition) ==
Halfway to Heaven (Deluxe edition)

Studio album by Brantley Gilbert
- Released: September 13, 2011
- Recorded: 2010–11 (deluxe edition)
- Genre: Country; rock; country rock
- Length: 59:49
- Label: Valory
- Producer: The Atom Brothers; Dann Huff

Singles from Halfway to Heaven (Deluxe edition)
- 1. "Country Must Be Country Wide" Released: April 25, 2011; 2. "You Don't Know Her Like I Do" Released: December 12, 2011; 3. "Kick It in the Sticks" Released: July 30, 2012; 4. "More Than Miles" Released: October 15, 2012

Professional ratings
Review scores
Source	Rating
Allmusic	3/5 stars

The deluxe version of the album was released on September 13, 2011 via Valory Music Group. This re-release featured remixes of all the tracks, as well as several new tracks that were not on the original version of the album.

Track listing

2011 deluxe reissue
No.	Title	Writer(s)	Length
1.	"Hell on Wheels"	Brantley Gilbert; Mike Dekle	4:13
2.	"Bending the Rules and Breaking the Law"	Gilbert; Jeremy Spillman	3:26
3.	"Back in the Day"	Gilbert; Dallas Davidson; Ben Hayslip	3:49
4.	"My Kind of Crazy"	Gilbert; Rhett Akins; Hayslip	3:34
5.	"Kick It in the Sticks"	Gilbert; Akins; Hayslip	3:45
6.	"Halfway to Heaven"	Gilbert; Mike Mobley; Spillman	3:10
7.	"Saving Amy"	Gilbert; Bonnie Baker	5:14
8.	"Country Must Be Country Wide"	Gilbert; Colt Ford; Dekle	3:35
9.	"Take It Outside"	Gilbert; John Merlino	4:16
10.	"Them Boys"	Gilbert; Ford; Dekle	3:55
11.	"Fall into Me"	Gilbert; Mobley; Spillman	4:00
12.	"Dirt Road Anthem (Revisited)" (with Colt Ford)	Gilbert; Ford	4:38
13.	"More Than Miles"	Gilbert; John Eddie	4:12
14.	"You Don't Know Her Like I Do"	Gilbert; Jim McCormick	4:47
15.	"Hell on an Angel"	Gilbert; Spillman	3:15

== Personnel ==
- A.J. Adams – dobro, pedal steel guitar
- The Atom Brothers – acoustic guitar, electric guitar, background vocals
- Randall Bramblett – Hammond B-3 organ, piano
- Andy Carlson – fiddle, viola, violin, string arrangements
- Davis Causey – electric guitar
- Eric Darken – percussion
- Will Doughty – piano, Hammond B-3 organ
- Dan Dugmore – pedal steel guitar, lap steel guitar
- Rachel Farley – background vocals
- Colt Ford – vocals on "Dirt Road Anthem (Revisited)"
- Jess Franklin – dobro, electric guitar, Hammond B-3 organ, slide guitar, background vocals
- Paul Franklin – pedal steel guitar
- Brantley Gilbert – acoustic guitar, lead vocals
- Gerry Hansen – drums
- Brandon Hicks – background vocals
- Dann Huff – acoustic guitar
- John Keane – pedal steel guitar
- John Merlino – electric guitar
- Tom Ryan – background vocals
- Ben Sims – drums
- Jane Van Voorhis – cello
- Jonathan Waggoner – bass guitar, acoustic guitar

== Charts ==
=== Weekly charts ===
Chart (2010–2011)	Peak position
US Billboard 200	4
US Top Country Albums (Billboard)	2
US Heatseekers Albums (Billboard)	1
US Independent Albums (Billboard)	13

=== Year-end charts ===
Chart (2011)	Position
US Billboard 200	182
US Top Country Albums (Billboard)	28
Chart (2012)	Position
US Billboard 200	55
US Top Country Albums (Billboard)	15
Chart (2013)	Position
US Billboard 200	131
US Top Country Albums (Billboard)	33

=== Singles ===
Year	Single	Peak chart positions				
Year	Single	US Country	US Country Airplay	US	CAN Country	CAN
2010	"Kick It in the Sticks"	—	—	—	—	—
2010	"My Kind of Crazy"	—	—	—	—	—
2011	"Them Boys"	—	—	—	—	—
2011	"Country Must Be Country Wide"	1	—	50	—	91
2011	"You Don't Know Her Like I Do"	1	—	49	—	73
2012	"Kick It in the Sticks" (re-release)^{A}	29	34	113	—	—
2012	"More Than Miles"	21	7	73	33	—
"—" denotes releases that did not chart

- ^{A} Did not enter the Hot 100 but charted on Bubbling Under Hot 100 Singles.

== Certifications ==
Region	Certification
United States (RIAA)	Platinum
