= Not Like Us (disambiguation) =

"Not Like Us" is a 2024 diss track by Kendrick Lamar.

Not Like Us may also refer to:

- "Not Like Us", a 2019 song by Brantley Gilbert from his album Fire & Brimstone
- Not Like Us, a 1995 comedy-horror film produced by Roger Corman from his Roger Corman Presents series
