= Them Boys =

Them Boys may refer to:

- "Them Boys", a song by Brantley Gilbert from his album Halfway to Heaven
- The Briscoes, a professional wrestling tag team known as "Dem Boys"
