= Rock This Town (disambiguation) =

"Rock This Town" is a song by the Stray Cats.

Rock This Town may also refer to:

- "Rock This Town", an episode of TV drama series Degrassi: The Next Generation (season 6)
- "Rock This Town", a song by Daniel Johnston on The Late Great Daniel Johnston: Discovered Covered, 2004
- "Rock This Town", a song by Brantley Gilbert on Modern Day Prodigal Son, 2009
- "Rock This Town", a song by Young JV on Doin' It Big, 2012
