= Jungle Boy =

Jungle Boy may refer to:

== People ==
- Jack Perry, professional wrestler
- Zach Walters, light heavyweight professional boxer

== Music ==
- "Jungle Boy", a song by John Eddie from John Eddie
- "Jungle Boy", a song by the Michael Hutchence side project, Flame Fortune
- "Jungle Boy", a song by Bow Wow Wow from their second studio album See Jungle! See Jungle! Go Join Your Gang, Yeah. City All Over! Go Ape Crazy.

== Film and television ==
- Jungle Boy (1987 film), a 1987 Malayalam film directed by P. Chandrakumar
- Jungle Boy (1996 film), a 1996 direct-to-video animated film produced by Blye Migicovsky Productions and Phoenix Animation Studios
- Jungle Boy (1998 film), a 1998 direct-to-video live action film
- Jungle Boy, a cartoon short aired serially during the first season of Johnny Bravo

== Other uses ==
- Jungle Boy, the prototype of Taito's Jungle Hunt arcade game
- Bomba, the Jungle Boy, a series of adventure books for boys
