= Rachel Farley =

American country music singer (born 1995)

- Born: March 28, 1995 (age 29); Lawrenceville, Georgia, U.S.
- Origin: Nashville, Tennessee
- Genres: Country
- Occupation: Singer
- Years active: 2012–present
- Labels: Red Bow

Rachel Farley (born March 28, 1995) is an American country music singer.

== Biography ==
Rachel Farley was born on March 28, 1995, in Lawrenceville, Georgia.

At age 13, Farley began opening for Brantley Gilbert. She also sang background vocals on Gilbert's 2012 single "Kick It in the Sticks".

She signed with Red Bow, a partnership of Broken Bow Records and RED Distribution, in 2012. Red Bow released her debut single, "Ain't Easy", in early 2013. Billy Dukes from Taste of Country gave the single a 3-star rating out of 5, saying that it "doesn't quite separate itself from the pack" but that it "will no doubt work as a live anthem". Ashley Cooke of Roughstock rated it 5 out of 5, saying that "There’s room for a new young female artist in Country Music and with her sassy, confident sound and rebellious demeanor, Farley may just have claimed that spot."

"Ain't Easy" was a minor Top 40 hit on the Billboard Country Airplay charts, reaching a peak of number 36. It was followed by "Midnight Road" later in 2013, which failed to chart, and Farley subsequently parted ways with Red Bow.

== Discography ==
=== Singles ===
Year	Single	Peak chart positions
Year	Single	US Country Airplay
2013	"Ain't Easy"	36
2013	"Midnight Road"	—
