= Jesus and Jones =

Single by Trace Adkins

from the album Something's Going On
- Released: January 19, 2016
- Recorded: 2015
- Genre: Country rock
- Length: 3:46
- Label: Wheelhouse
- Songwriter(s): Casey Beathard; Tyler Farr; Jim McCormick
- Producer(s): Mickey Jack Cones

Trace Adkins singles chronology
"Watch the World End" (2013)	"Jesus and Jones" (2016)	"Lit" (2016)

"Jesus and Jones" is a song recorded by American country music artist Trace Adkins. It was released to radio on January 19, 2016, as the lead single to his debut album for Wheelhouse Records, and his fifteenth overall, Something's Going On. The song was written by Tyler Farr, Jim McCormick, and Casey Beathard.

== Content ==
The song discusses Trace being "In a War" since he was a kid trying to be like Jesus and Country Music icon George Jones.

== Music video ==
The music video was directed by Peter Zavadil and premiered on CMT, GAC & VEVO in 2016.

== Critical reception ==
The website "For The Country Record" gave the song a negative review, saying "Now, please Trace fans, put down the pitch forks and torches, because, believe me, I’m actually on your side. I love Trace, always have. I love his deep, rich baritone, his confident personality, and his music, but let’s face facts; this song just isn’t up to par with his earlier music. This song is really just a result of lazy songwriting and bad production. You can’t blame it on the theme, because when done well, the theme is a great and relatable one. Plenty of artists have pulled it off beautifully; Big and Rich’s “Between Raising Hell and Amazing Grace”, Brian Randle's “Heaven and Hank”, Eric Church's “Like Jesus Does”, and Eric Lee Beddingfield's “The Gospel According to Jones”, all come to mind."

== Chart performance ==
Chart (2016)	Peak position
US Country Airplay (Billboard)	41
