= Jim McCormick (songwriter) =

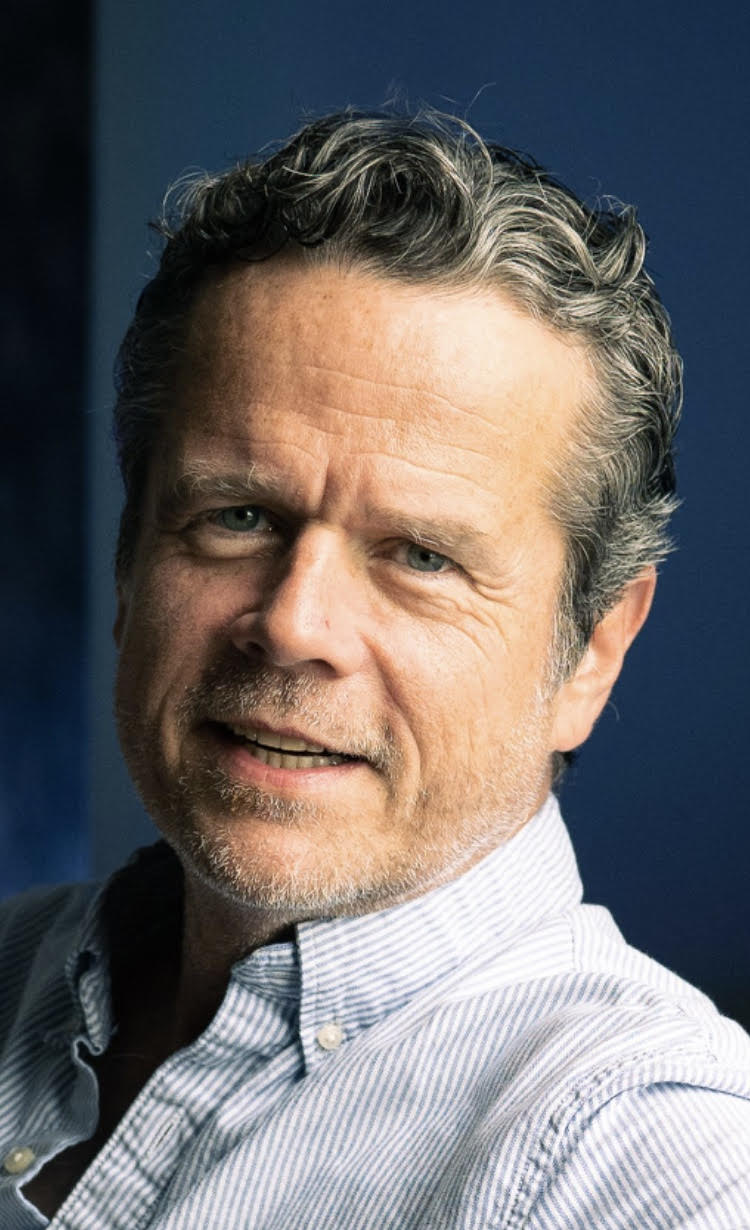

Background information
- Born: New Orleans, Louisiana
- Genres: Country, pop, rock
- Occupation: Songwriter
- Years active: 2000–present

Jim McCormick is a Grammy- and CMA-nominated, multiplatinum-selling songwriter. He is currently a staff writer at Eclipse Music Publishing.

In 2021, his song "The Good Ones" was nominated by the Country Music Association for Song of the Year. That same year "The Good Ones" won the Favorite Country Song category at the American Music Awards.

McCormick has celebrated three #1 songs on the Billboard Country Airplay chart: Gabby Barrett's "The Good Ones" and Jason Aldean's "Take A Little Ride," both of which spent three weeks in the #1 position; and Brantley Gilbert's "You Don't Know Her Like I Do." Current releases written by McCormick include Trace Adkins' "Welcome To," Luke Bryan's "All My Dreaming There," Jason Aldean's "When The Lights Go Out," Harry Connick Jr.'s "I Do Like We Do," Jon Pardi's "Lucky Tonight," and Trace Adkins's "Jesus and Jones." His songs also have been recorded and performed by Tim McGraw, Keith Urban, Kelly Clarkson, Jeff Tweedy, Trisha Yearwood, Randy Travis, Ronnie Milsap, Jamey Johnson, Samantha Fish, Smash Mouth as well as many others.

== Early life and education ==
McCormick was born and raised in New Orleans, Louisiana. He attended Jesuit High School where he formed a band with his classmate Ed Conway. Initially a communications major his freshman year at Loyola University, he transferred into the School of Business at Georgetown University his sophomore year. While at Georgetown, McCormick enrolled in a poetry workshop led by the poet Roland Flint and became enamored with the art form, eventually switching his major to English and earning a Lannan fellowship and the Academy of American Poets "Poetry Prize." After graduating from Georgetown in 1990 with a Bachelor of Arts degree in English, McCormick moved back to New Orleans where he received a Masters of Fine Arts in poetry while teaching freshman composition at the University of New Orleans.

== Musical career ==
While in high school, McCormick had formed the band Resonance with classmate Ed Conway. In 1991, the two formed The Bingemen: Marc Funti (drums), Cleaver Schmidt (bass and vocals), Conway (guitar), and McCormick (vocals). Playing primarily in a roots rock style, the band toured extensively with bands such as the Continental Drifters, Better than Ezra, the subdudes, Pat McLaughlin, Dash Riprock, and Cowboy Mouth. The band released their debut EP "Motor in the Ocean" in 1991 and a full-length self-titled album in 1996. In the same year the band performed at South by Southwest and at the New Orleans Jazz and Heritage Festival. They broke up in 1999.

As a solo artist, McCormick has released four albums: 2001's Jim McCormick, You Can't Drown Your Sorrows in 2004, Live at Jazz Fest in 2012, and The Middle of the River in 2013.

McCormick has served as a board of governors' vice-president for the Recording Academy and on the board of the Nashville Songwriters Association International. For more than a decade, McCormick has been an adjunct faculty member in the Music Industry Studies program at Loyola University in New Orleans as well as lectured on the craft and business of songwriting at Berklee College of Music, Georgetown University, Vanderbilt University, Belmont University, and Tulane University, as well as at GrammyPro and NSAI events. He is a member of Nashville's Leadership Music class of 2013 and a recipient of the Academy of American Poets "Poetry Prize" and the Cutting Edge Music Conference's Lifetime Achievement Award.

Along with notable New Orleanians PJ Morton, Jay Weigel, Raj Smoove, and others, he formed the New Orleans Music Economy (NOME) initiative in 2018 in partnership with Greater New Orleans Inc. to help promote music copyright infrastructure in his hometown.

== Songwriting ==
After a visit to Nashville in 2000, McCormick began to consider using his formal training in poetry to write songs. He spent the next four years splitting time between New Orleans and Nashville, where he'd sleep on friends’ couches while writing three to four songs a day. In 2003, McCormick signed his first publishing agreement with James Stroud and Jimmy Metts at Generator Music Publishing Company, where he wrote for two years before signing with Warner Chappell Music. From 2010 to 2020, he held a publishing deal with BMG. In April 2020, he signed with Eclipse Music Group.

McCormick currently splits his time between Nashville and New Orleans.

Songs Recorded	Artist	Release Date	Peak Chart Positions				Certifications
Songs Recorded	Artist	Release Date	US	US Country Songs	US Country Airplay	World	Certifications
One of Us	James Barker Band	2025					
The Good Ones	Gabby Barrett	2020	19	1	1	96	RIAA: Platinum
Cowboys Are My Weakness	Trisha Yearwood	2020					
Lulaby	David Osmond	2019					
Right Once	David Osmond	2019					
You Wanted Me	David Osmond	2019					
Good Times Ain’t What They Used To Be	Jamey Johnson	2018					
Live to Love Another Day	Smash Mouth	2018					
Noise	Shenandoah	2017					
Lucky Tonight	Jon Pardi	2017					
We Rode In Trucks	Luke Bryan	2017			33		RIAA: Gold
The Cowboy's Mine	Joey Martin	2017					
Louisiana	Tim McGraw	2016					
Jesus And Jones	Trace Adkins	2016			44		
Blame It On A Woman	Shane Owens	2016					
Nobody Does I Do Like We Do	Harry Connick Jr.	2015					
Good Lookin’ Girl	Luke Bryan	2014					
Noise	Radney Foster	2014					
Cold Beer Drinker	Luke Bryan	2013					
I'm In Love With The Girl	Luke Bryan	2013					
Sorority Girl	Luke Bryan	2013					
Slow Moving Memory	Ty Herndon	2013					
The Shake	The Elms	2013					
Unless God Appears First	The Elms	2013					
The Wildest Heart	The Elms	2013					
The Little Ways	The Elms	2013					
Lily	The Elms	2013					
Saturday High	Cowboy Mouth	2013					
Take A Little Ride	Jason Aldean	2012	12	1			RIAA: Platinum
When I Get It	Craig Campbell	2012					
Country Life	Brian Milson	2012					
Love Like This	Cory Morrow	2012					
You Don't Know Her Like I Do	Brantley Gilbert	2011	49	1	1		RIAA: Platinum
Georgia Mud	Joanna Smith	2011					
A Little Bit Of Missing You	Trace Adkins	2010					
Like Father, Like Son	Hollywood "Wolf" Yates	2010					
Good Southern Girl	Amanda Shaw	2010					
Cruise	Amanda Shaw	2010					
A Girl Could Get Hurt This Way	Lindsey Mendez	2010					
Dirt Road Dancing	Matt Stillwell and Colt Ford	2010					
Here In Louisiana	Hip Boot Joe	2010					
Every Time I See You	Luke Bryan	2009					
You Didn't Have A Good Time	Randy Travis	2009					
Changes	Jaryd lane	2009					
One Thing	Jeff Bates	2009					
Still Remains	Cartel	2009					
Roadside Sandwich	Jessie Farrell	2009					
Girls With Girlfriends	Chris Cavanaugh	2009					
You Just Want Me	Hannah Weeks	2009					
Girls With Girlfriends	Liam Brew	2009					
Dirt Road Dancing	Cooper Boone	2009					
Happy To Be Here	Trace Adkins	2008					
Pretty Runs Out	Amanda Shaw	2008					
Rock n Roll & Pensacola	Joshua Stevens	2008					
It's All Coming Back To Me Now	Ronnie Milsap	2006					
Right For Me	Dayna Kurtz	2006					
Time Well Spent	Bobby Pinson	2005					
You Can't Drown Your Sorrows	Kim Carson	2004					
Young Animal	Mulebone	1998					
Around The Lakeside	Kim Carson	1998					
