= The Weekend (Brantley Gilbert song) =

Single by Brantley Gilbert

from the album The Devil Don't Sleep
- Released: August 8, 2016
- Recorded: 2016
- Genre: Country
- Length: 3:10
- Label: Valory
- Songwriters: Brantley Gilbert; Andrew DeRoberts
- Producer: Dann Huff

Brantley Gilbert singles chronology
"Stone Cold Sober" (2015)	"The Weekend" (2016)	"The Ones That Like Me" (2017)

"The Weekend" is a song co-written and recorded by American country rock singer Brantley Gilbert. The song is written by Gilbert together with Andrew DeRoberts, and produced by Dann Huff. It was released to radio on August 8, 2016, as the first single from his fourth studio album The Devil Don't Sleep (2017). "The Weekend" peaked at numbers seven and nine on both the Billboard Country Airplay and Hot Country Songs charts respectively. It also reached number 64 on the Hot 100 chart. The song was certified Platinum by the Recording Industry Association of America (RIAA), and has sold 303,000 copies in that country as of May 2017. The accompanying music video for the single, directed by Shane Drake, features both his wife and his band.

== Background and development ==
"The Weekend" was written by Gilbert and Andrew DeRoberts, however, the two writers did not meet until the song had been written as they had conducted the songwriting over the phone. According to Gilbert, he was sent two of Andrew DeRoberts' songs by Kos Weaver, who had signed him to a publishing deal at Warner/Chappell. Gilbert said: "I listened to him and probably called him 10 or 15 minutes later, and within a week, we had both of them written over the phone, which was a first for me. I'd never written anything in its entirety over a phone." Both songs are included in Gilbert's album The Devil Don't Sleep.

== Commercial performance ==
"The Weekend" debuted at number 38 on the Billboard Country Airplay chart dated August 6, 2016. It entered the Hot Country Songs chart the next week at number 23, with 30,000 copies sold in its first week of sales, the third best-selling song of the week. On the week of February 18, 2017, the song peaked at number nine on the Hot Country Songs chart, and spent a total of 38 weeks on the chart. It reached number seven on the Country Airplay chart dated May 20, staying for 44 weeks. The song also debuted at number 95 on the Hot 100 chart for the week of January 21, 2017. Fourteen weeks later, it peaked at number 64, and remained on the chart for twenty weeks. The song was certified platinum by the RIAA on March 27, 2018. It has sold 303,000 copies in the United States as of May 2017.

In Canada, the track debuted at number 47 on the Canada Country chart for the week of December 24, 2016, and peaked at number 18 the week of April 15, 2017, staying on the chart for 22 weeks.

== Music video ==
The song's music video was directed by Shane Drake and premiered in October 2016. The video features his wife Amber and his band.

== Chart performance ==
=== Weekly charts ===
Chart (2016–2017)	Peak position
Canada Country (Billboard)	18
US Billboard Hot 100	64
US Country Airplay (Billboard)	7
US Hot Country Songs (Billboard)	9

=== Year-end charts ===
Chart (2016)	Position
US Hot Country Songs (Billboard)	96

Chart (2017)	Position
US Country Airplay (Billboard)	23
US Hot Country Songs (Billboard)	37

== Certifications ==
Region	Certification	Certified units/sales
United States (RIAA)	Platinum	1,000,000^{‡}
^{‡} Sales+streaming figures based on certification alone.
