= The Devil Don't Sleep =

Studio album by Brantley Gilbert
- Released: January 27, 2017
- Genre: Country
- Length: 60:37
- Label: Valory
- Producer: Dann Huff; Scott Borchetta (exec.)

Brantley Gilbert chronology
Just as I Am (2014)	The Devil Don't Sleep (2017)	Fire & Brimstone (2019)

Singles from The Devil Don't Sleep
- 1. "The Weekend" Released: August 8, 2016; 2. "The Ones That Like Me" Released: June 12, 2017

The Devil Don't Sleep is the fourth studio album by American country rock singer Brantley Gilbert. It was released on January 27, 2017, via Valory Music Group. The album includes the singles "The Weekend" and "The Ones That Like Me". Gilbert wrote or co-wrote all sixteen tracks.

== Critical reception ==
Rating it 4 out of 5 stars, Stephen Thomas Erlewine of Allmusic wrote that "he rarely seems dour on the bigger, bolder tunes, all of which sound like they're just on the verge of cutting loose" and "He's more of a romantic, specializing in lightly soulful slow-burners that wind up complementing his minor-key anthems." Chuck Yarborough of The Plain Dealer rated the album "C+", saying that "His songwriting style is exactly what the under-30 country fan likes", citing the first half of the album as more mainstream and contemporary in sound, while highlighting the lyrics of "Baby Be Crazy" and "Three Feet of Water", concluding his review with "Those 'young country' tunes lead it off, and are just about guaranteed hits...But it's those second-half songs that show the possibility of longevity."

== Commercial performance ==
The album debuted at No. 1 on Billboard's Top Country Albums chart with sales of 66,000 copies in the first week, which made it the top selling album of the week in the United States. It also debuted at No. 2 on Billboard 200 based on 77,000 units (traditional sales plus tracks and streams). The album sold a further 19,000 copies in the second week. The album has sold 218,200 copies in the US as of August 2018.

== Track listing ==
No.	Title	Writer(s)	Length
1.	"Rockin' Chairs"	Brantley Gilbert	4:08
2.	"The Ones That Like Me"	Gilbert; Blake Chaffin; Bobby Pinson	3:25
3.	"The Weekend"	Gilbert; Andrew DeRoberts	3:10
4.	"You Could Be That Girl"	Gilbert; Tony Martin; Neil Thrasher	3:48
5.	"Smokin' Gun"	Gilbert; Brian Davis; Derek George	3:39
6.	"Bro Code"	Gilbert	3:13
7.	"It's About to Get Dirty"	Gilbert; Davis	4:31
8.	"Tried to Tell Ya"	Gilbert; Rhett Akins; Ben Hayslip	3:42
9.	"In My Head"	Gilbert; Davis; Justin Weaver	3:43
10.	"Way Back"	Gilbert; DeRoberts	3:39
11.	"Baby Be Crazy"	Gilbert; Brett James	3:31
12.	"Outlaw in Me"	Gilbert	3:28
13.	"Bullet in a Bonfire"	Gilbert; Akins; Hayslip	4:22
14.	"The Devil Don't Sleep"	Gilbert	3:45
15.	"We're Gonna Ride Again"	Gilbert; Mike Dekle; Jess Franklin	4:40
16.	"Three Feet of Water"	Gilbert; Jeremy Bussey; Jayce Hein; Barry Poole	3:53

Deluxe Edition (Disc Two tracks on physical version)
No.	Title	Writer(s)	Length
1.	"At Least We Thought It Was" (demo)	Gilbert	3:46
2.	"I've Been There Before" (demo)	Gilbert	3:59
3.	"Against the World" (demo)	Gilbert; Davis	3:50
4.	"Closer Than We've Ever Been" (demo)	Gilbert; Wayd Battle	4:23
5.	"You Promised" (demo)	Gilbert	5:10
6.	"Read Me My Rights" (live at Red Rocks)	Gilbert; Davis; Franklin	4:20
7.	"Hell on Wheels" (live at Red Rocks)	Gilbert; Dekle	4:23
8.	"Grown Ass Man" (live at Red Rocks)	Gilbert	6:51
9.	"Outlaw Women" (live at Red Rocks)	Hank Williams Jr.	8:00
10.	"Kick It in the Sticks" (live at Red Rocks)	Gilbert; Akins; Hayslip	4:14

== Personnel ==
- Jess Franklin – backing vocals, electric guitar
- BJ Golden – guitar, mandolin, bouzouki
- Vicki Hampton – backing vocals
- Noah Henson – guitar
- Dann Huff – mandolin, bouzouki, keyboards, resonator guitar, banjo, guitar, synth bass
- Charlie Judge – keyboards
- Kim Keyes – backing vocals
- Stephen Lewis – bass
- Chris McHugh – drums
- Gordon Mote – piano
- Ben Sims – drums
- Jimmie Lee Sloas – bass
- Russell Terrell – backing vocals
- Ilya Toshinskiy – acoustic guitar
- Jonathan Yudkin – mandolin, cello

Personnel on deluxe edition tracks:

- Dan Agee – acoustic guitar, electric guitar
- Bruce Bouton – steel guitar
- Steve Brewster – drums
- Jimmy Carter – bass
- J. T. Corenflos – electric guitar
- Shannon Forrest – drums
- Mark Hill – bass
- Jedd Hughes – electric guitar
- Troy Johnson – backing vocals
- Jeff King – electric guitar
- Wes Little – drums
- Pat McGrath – acoustic guitar
- Ethan Pilsner – bass
- Adam Shoenfeld – electric guitar
- Jason Webb – keyboards

== Charts ==
=== Album ===
==== Weekly charts ====
Chart (2017)	Peak position
Australian Albums (ARIA)	34
Canadian Albums (Billboard)	5
New Zealand Heatseeker Albums (RMNZ)	9
US Billboard 200	2
US Top Country Albums (Billboard)	1

==== Year-end charts ====
Chart (2017)	Position
US Billboard 200	121
US Top Country Albums (Billboard)	12
Chart (2018)	Position
US Top Country Albums (Billboard)	65

=== Singles ===
Year	Single	Peak chart positions			Sales
Year	Single	US Hot Country	US Country Airplay	US	Sales
2016	"The Weekend"	9	7	64	US: 303,000
2017	"The Ones That Like Me"	22	15		
"—" denotes releases that did not chart

== Certifications ==
Certifications for The Devil Don't Sleep
Region	Certification	Certified units/sales
United States (RIAA)	Gold	500,000^{‡}
^{‡} Sales+streaming figures based on certification alone.
