= Bottoms Up (Brantley Gilbert song) =

Single by Brantley Gilbert

from the album Just as I Am
- Released: December 16, 2013
- Recorded: 2013
- Genre: Country rock
- Length: 3:42
- Label: Valory
- Songwriters: Brantley Gilbert; Justin Weaver; Brett James
- Producer: Dann Huff

Brantley Gilbert singles chronology
"More Than Miles" (2012)	"Bottoms Up" (2013)	"Small Town Throwdown" (2014)

"Bottoms Up" is a song recorded by American country rock singer Brantley Gilbert. It is the first single from his third studio album Just as I Am, and was released on December 16, 2013. The song was written by Gilbert, Justin Weaver and Brett James. A remix featuring Atlanta-based rapper T.I., was included on the reissue of Just as I Am.

== Content ==
The song is a mid-tempo song with country rock influences. The song has the male narrator addressing his lover and offering to party with her by telling her, "tonight it's bottoms up."

== Reception ==
=== Critical ===
Giving it 4 out of 5 stars, Markos Papadatos of Digital Journal wrote that "With this new song, he has shown maturity as both a vocalist and songwriter…'Bottoms Up' seems like a fun track for him to play at his live shows that will surely get the crowd excited." Matt Bjorke of Roughstock rated it 3.5 out of 5, saying that "If you like the sound of the stuff from Luke Bryan, Florida Georgia Line and Thomas Rhett, you’ll certainly enjoy 'Bottoms Up.' If you wanted the more ‘edgy’ rockin’ side to Brantley, this one certainly isn’t gonna be your kind of song. It’s certainly no 'Hell on Wheels' or 'Kick It in the Sticks' but it’s also not far removed vocally from 'More Than Miles.'"

=== Commercial ===
Released on December 16, 2013, the song premiered at the No. 1 spot at Country Digital Songs with 63,000 downloads sold. The song reached a million in sales in the U.S. by April 2014, and became the first million-selling song by Brantley Gilbert. The song was certified Platinum by RIAA on May 1, 2014. The song has sold 1,762,000 copies in the U.S. as of June 2015.

== Music video ==
Shane Drake directed the music video. In it, Gilbert is dressed in 1930s apparel and surrounded by flappers while smuggling illegal moonshine.

== Charts and certifications ==
=== Weekly charts ===
Chart (2013–2014)	Peak position
Canada Hot 100 (Billboard)	41
Canada Country (Billboard)	3
US Billboard Hot 100	20
US Country Airplay (Billboard)	1
US Hot Country Songs (Billboard)	1

=== Year-end charts ===
Chart (2014)	Position
US Billboard Hot 100	68
US Country Airplay (Billboard)	39
US Hot Country Songs (Billboard)	4

=== Certifications ===
Region	Certification	Certified units/sales
New Zealand (RMNZ)	Gold	15,000^{‡}
United States (RIAA)	7× Platinum	1,762,000
^{‡} Sales+streaming figures based on certification alone.
