= Rolex on a Redneck =

2022 song by Brantley Gilbert

Promotional single by Brantley Gilbert featuring Jason Aldean

from the album So Help Me God
- Released: March 25, 2022
- Genre: Country rock
- Length: 2:59
- Label: Valory
- Songwriters: Brock Berryhill; Brantley Gilbert; Michael Hardy; Randy Montana; Taylor Phillips

Lyric video
- "Rolex on a Redneck" on YouTube

"Rolex on a Redneck" is a song by American country rock singer Brantley Gilbert featuring Jason Aldean. It was released on March 25, 2022, as the third promotional single from Gilbert's seventh studio album, So Help Me God. The song peaked at number 41 on the US Billboard Hot Country Songs chart.

== Content ==
The song, written by Gilbert, Brock Berryhill, and Michael Hardy, is an ode to reaping the benefits that working can get you. The chorus, "It can put a Rolex on a redneck / It can put some inches on your big black Chevy / It can put a Yeti on your back deck, slap full of longnecks / Camo on your brand new Benelli", is full of references to the benefits of working on the job.

== Commercial performance ==
Despite not being released to country radio, the song topped the Country Digital Song Sales chart and peaked at number 41 on the Hot Country Songs chart.

== Charts ==
Chart performance for "Rolex on a Redneck"
Chart (2022)	Peak position
Canadian Digital Song Sales (Billboard)	37
US Digital Song Sales (Billboard)	6
US Hot Country Songs (Billboard)	41

== Certifications ==
Certifications for "Rolex on a Redneck"
Region	Certification	Certified units/sales
United States (RIAA)	Gold	500,000^{‡}
^{‡} Sales+streaming figures based on certification alone.
