= Son of the Dirty South =

2022 promotional single by Brantley Gilbert

Promotional single by Brantley Gilbert featuring Jelly Roll

from the album So Help Me God
- Released: June 24, 2022
- Genre: Country rock; Country rap
- Length: 2:59
- Label: Valory
- Songwriters: Andrew Baylis; Brantley Gilbert; Jason DeFord

Music video
- "Son of the Dirty South" on YouTube

"Son of the Dirty South" is a song by American country rock singer Brantley Gilbert featuring Jelly Roll. It was released on June 24, 2022, as the fourth promotional single from Gilbert's seventh studio album, So Help Me God.

== Content ==
The song, released on June 24, 2022, is a mix of the country rock music style of Gilbert, and the hip-hop style of Jelly Roll. The song includes references to the country lifestyle such as "gravy biscuits and fried chicken", as well as Jelly Roll's upbringing with Hank Williams, Three 6 Mafia, and Kid Rock being name dropped.

== Music video ==
The music video was released two days later on June 26, 2022. It consists of Gilbert and Jelly Roll at a mudding party in a field surrounded by partygoers.

== Charts ==
Chart performance for "Son of the Dirty South"
Chart (2022)	Peak position
US Digital Song Sales (Billboard)	15
US Hot Country Songs (Billboard)	48

== Certifications ==
Certifications for "Son of the Dirty South"
Region	Certification	Certified units/sales
United States (RIAA)	Gold	500,000^{‡}
^{‡} Sales+streaming figures based on certification alone.
