= John Eddie =

American rock singer

- Born: John Edward Cummings, Jr. July 9, 1959 (age 67)
- Origin: Richmond, Virginia, U.S.
- Genre: Rock
- Occupations: Singer-songwriter, screenwriter, television producer
- Instrument: Guitar
- Labels: Columbia Records; Elektra Records; Lost Highway Records

John Edward Cummings Jr. (born July 9, 1959) is an American singer-songwriter, screenwriter, and producer. Born in Richmond, Virginia, Eddie moved to New Jersey in the 1970s and became a popular club circuit musician there, occasionally performing with Bruce Springsteen.

== Music career ==
John's first studio presence was singing backing vocals on Bryan Adams' song "Somebody" on the 1984 album Reckless. John then signed with Columbia Records and released two albums including his 1986 self-titled debut, John Eddie. The first single, "Jungle Boy", from John Eddie peaked on Billboard at #17 Rock and #52 Hot 100. At the label's behest, his long-time band, the Front Street Runners, was replaced for the album by members of Springsteen's E Street Band. He opened for Bob Seger and The Kinks in the late 1980s but was dropped by the label early in the 1990s after the release of his second album, The Hard Cold Truth. He then signed with Elektra Records where he was chosen to represent Elektra on their 40th Anniversary record called Rubaiyat with his version of The Cure's "In Between Days" and recorded a third album, Still in the Same Cage, which, after a lengthy legal dispute, was never released. Since then Eddie has recorded independently and toured extensively; his career saw a resurgence when independent radio promotion person and long-time fan Michele Clark became his manager in 2000. Clark secured a record deal for Eddie with Lost Highway Records and executive produced the 2003 release of Who the Hell is John Eddie? The album subsequently produced three top 10 singles at the Triple-A Radio format. Kid Rock has covered "Lowlife", "Forty" and "Happy New Year" all written by John Eddie.

His latest album, entitled Same Old Brand New Me, was released in February 2012, featuring 18 songs. In 2013, the song Eddie co-wrote with Brantley Gilbert, "More Than Miles", became a top country hit for Gilbert, peaking at No. 7 on the Billboard country charts. Eddie also had a song featured in the Zac Efron film, At Any Price, entitled "The Man I Am" that was released as a single April 19, 2013.

On August 16, 2019, it was announced that he, in conjunction with Priscilla Presley and Sony Pictures Animation, will create and produce "Agent Elvis", a Netflix adult animated series focusing on Elvis Presley's nightly incursions as a spy for the US Government, while remaining a musician during the day.

== Discography ==
- John Eddie (Columbia Records, 1986) US #83
- The Hard Cold Truth (Columbia Records, 1989)
- Still in the Same Cage (Elektra Records, 1991) (unreleased)
- Seven Songs Since My Last Confession (EP) (Lost American Thrill Show, 1997)
- Happily Never After (Lost American Thrill Show, 1999)
- Guy Walks Into a Bar... John Eddie Live (Lost American Thrill Show, 2001)
- Who the Hell is John Eddie? (Lost Highway Records, 2003)
- Same Old Brand New Me (Play My Records, 2012)

== In popular culture ==
Eddie's name appears on the club letterboard shown in the closing scenes of Bruce Springsteen's Born in the USA video.
