= You Don't Know Her Like I Do =

Single by Brantley Gilbert

from the album Halfway to Heaven
- Released: December 12, 2011
- Recorded: 2011
- Genre: Country
- Length: 4:47 (album version); 3:38 (radio edit)
- Label: Valory
- Songwriters: Brantley Gilbert; Jim McCormick
- Producer: Dann Huff

Brantley Gilbert singles chronology
"Country Must Be Country Wide" (2011)	"You Don't Know Her Like I Do" (2011)	"Kick It in the Sticks" (2012)

"You Don't Know Her Like I Do" is a song recorded by American country rock singer Brantley Gilbert. It was released in December 2011 as the second single from the deluxe edition of his 2010 album Halfway to Heaven. The song was written by Gilbert and Jim McCormick and was the second most-played country song on radio in 2012.

== Critical reception ==
Billy Dukes of Taste of Country gave the song three and a half stars out of five, saying that it "allows the singer to show a dark vulnerability that is sure to make him a more appealing artist to country music fans who may be turned off by his brand of country rock." Bobby Peacock of Roughstock gave the song four stars out of five, calling it an "excellent single choice" and writing that "Brantley's gravelly voice is passionate, vulnerable and maybe just a little angered."

== Music video ==
The music video was directed by Justin Key and premiered in December 2011. It is composed entirely of tour footage, showing Gilbert performing the song at a concert. Scenes also show him in a radio interview, signing autographs, and sitting in a chair against a blue backlit screen acting down and depressed, like he relates to the lyrics of the song. The video uses the radio edit of the song which cuts outs the reprise at the end.

== Chart performance ==
"You Don't Know Her Like I Do" debuted at number 52 on the U.S. Billboard Hot Country Songs chart for the week of December 17, 2011. It became his second consecutive number one single in July 2012. The song has sold 999,000 copies in the U.S. as of April 2014.

Chart (2011–2012)	Peak position
Canada Hot 100 (Billboard)	73
US Billboard Hot 100	49
US Hot Country Songs (Billboard)	1

=== Year-end charts ===
Chart (2012)	Position
US Country Songs (Billboard)	2

== Certifications ==
Region	Certification	Certified units/sales
United States (RIAA)	Platinum	1,000,000^{‡}
^{‡} Sales+streaming figures based on certification alone.
