= Heaven by Then =

Single by Brantley Gilbert featuring Blake Shelton and Vince Gill

from the album So Help Me God
- Released: November 10, 2022
- Genre: Country rock
- Length: 3:02
- Label: Valory
- Songwriters: Brock Berryhill; Brantley Gilbert; Michael Hardy; Jake Mitchell; Randy Montana; Hunter Phelps; Taylor Phillips
- Producer: DJ Chill

Brantley Gilbert singles chronology
"The Worst Country Song of All Time" (2021)	"Heaven by Then" (2022)	"Over When We're Sober" (2024)

Blake Shelton singles chronology
"No Body" (2022)	"Heaven by Then" (2022)	"Purple Irises" (2024)

Vince Gill singles chronology
"A Letter to My Mama" (2019)	"Heaven by Then" (2022)

Music video
- "Heaven by Then" on YouTube

"Heaven by Then" is a song by American country rock singer Brantley Gilbert featuring Blake Shelton and Vince Gill. It was released on November 10, 2022, as the second single from Gilbert's seventh studio album, So Help Me God.

== Content ==
The song, written by Gilbert, Michael Hardy, Brock Berryhill, and Randy Montana, references the pace of life and how Gilbert hopes that when certain things happen he's in heaven by then. The second verse, sung by Blake Shelton, emphasizes the love for the country lifestyle, "When they pave all the dirt roads / and John Deeres are dinosaurs / When the last back forty gets sold / and young boys don't open doors", finishing with "Hell, I hope I'm in heaven by then". Shelton and Vince Gill are featured on the song with what Gilbert describes as "bucket list features". After Shelton recorded his verses, Gilbert noticed there was a "high harmony" missing in the chorus, and so they enlisted Gill to carry backing vocals for the chorus.

== Charts ==
Chart performance for "Heaven by Then"
Chart (2022)	Peak position
US Country Airplay (Billboard)	29
US Country Digital Song Sales (Billboard)	25
