= Gone But Not Forgotten (song) =

Promotional single by Brantley Gilbert

from the album So Help Me God
- Released: September 21, 2021
- Genre: Country rock
- Length: 2:53
- Label: Valory
- Songwriters: Brock Berryhill; Jason Blaine; Jay Brunswick; Brantley Gilbert

Music video
- "Gone But Not Forgotten" on YouTube

"Gone But Not Forgotten" is a song by American country rock singer Brantley Gilbert, released on September 17, 2021 as the first promotional single from Gilbert's seventh studio album, So Help Me God. The song was dedicated to the men and women of the United States Military.

== Content ==
The song, written by Gilbert, Brock Berryhill, Jason Blaine, and Jay Brunswick, was dedicated to the troops of the US Military who were killed in Afghanistan.

"(Thirteen) brave American heroes made the ultimate sacrifice for freedom this week," Gilbert wrote on social media. "In hard times like this, I always find myself turning to music. I wrote this song a while back as a tribute to all of the folks we've lost, both overseas and in our own communities here at home. Wanted to share it with y'all in hopes it might resonate with someone who needs to hear it right now."

== Music video ==
The song received a music video, released less than a month later on November 9, 2021. The video contains clips from archival videos of United States Military soldiers, and features Gilbert in a cemetery in order to pay his respects for the fallen soldiers. The video is mostly shot in black and white to maintain a somber approach.

== Accolades ==
The song won Favorite Sentimental Song at the 2021 Country Now Awards. Gilbert shared on his social media the following day, "Appreciate it more than you'll ever know. The song means a lot to me and I'd say it means a lot to y'all. Much love, hope to see y'all on the road soon."
