= How to Talk to Girls (song) =

Promotional single by Brantley Gilbert

from the album So Help Me God
- Released: November 19, 2021
- Genre: Country rock
- Label: Valory
- Songwriters: Brock Berryhill; Brian Davis; Brandon Day; Brantley Gilbert; Chase McGill; Josh Phillips; Taylor Phillips; Michael Ray

Music video
- "How to Talk to Girls" on YouTube

"How to Talk to Girls" is a song by American country rock singer Brantley Gilbert, released on November 19, 2021, as the second promotional single from Gilbert's seventh studio album, So Help Me God. The song eventually headlined an EP, How to Talk to Girls: The Love Songs, in 2022.

== Content ==
Gilbert states that the song is his "love letter to his daughters and his wife". The song contains many references to his children and his wife, and the fact that he is still learning everyday about the women in his life.

== Music video ==
The music video for the song was released on January 27, 2022. It features footage of his wife and daughters, as the song is dedicated to them.

== Commercial performance ==
Released as a promotional single, the song did not gain the traction of other singles on So Help Me God, however the music video was well received by critics for the depiction of his family.
