= Country Must Be Country Wide =

Single by Brantley Gilbert

from the album Halfway to Heaven
- Released: April 25, 2011
- Recorded: 2010
- Genre: Country rock
- Length: 3:35
- Label: Valory
- Songwriters: Brantley Gilbert; Colt Ford; Mike Dekle
- Producer: Dann Huff

Brantley Gilbert singles chronology
"Them Boys" (2011)	"Country Must Be Country Wide" (2011)	"You Don't Know Her Like I Do" (2011)

"Country Must Be Country Wide" is a song co-written and recorded by American country rock singer Brantley Gilbert. It was released in April 2011 as the first single from the deluxe edition of his 2010 album Halfway to Heaven.

== Content ==
In the song, Gilbert sings about the country music fanbase, saying that it is not limited to the Southern United States. Gilbert told Taste of Country that he wrote the song while on tour with country rap artist Colt Ford and Mike Dekle. Ford told Country Weekly that, while touring through Ohio, he realized that "there are rednecks everywhere[…]I was like, 'those people are all just like us, but they just sound different.'" Gilbert added that while in Ohio, he saw a man exit a truck while dressed in a cowboy hat and boots, which inspired the first verse of the song.

== Critical reception ==
Dan MacIntosh of Country Standard Time thought that the song "lives up to that 'up to 11' promise" that he thought was established in the songs that Gilbert wrote for Jason Aldean ("Dirt Road Anthem" and "My Kinda Party"). Kevin John Coyne of Country Universe gave the single a less favorable review, juxtaposing the song to Neal McCoy's "The City Put the Country Back in Me" and writing that "This song is about as country as "Wanted Dead or Alive" anyway.

== Music video ==
The music video was directed by Shane Drake.

== Commercial performance ==
The song debuted on the Hot Country Songs chart at No. 44 for the chart date April 23, 2011, and eventually reached No. 1 on that chart on December 3, 2011. It debuted on the Billboard Hot 100 at No. 100 on July 9, 2011, eventually reaching No. 50 the same week it reach No. 1 on the Hot Country Songs chart. The song was certified Platinum by the RIAA on March 25, 2014, and reached its million sales mark in the U.S. in June 2014.

== Charts ==
=== Weekly charts ===
Chart (2011–2012)	Peak position
US Hot Country Songs (Billboard)	1
US Billboard Hot 100	50
Canada Hot 100 (Billboard)	91

=== Year-end charts ===
Chart (2011)	Position
US Country Songs (Billboard)	30

Chart (2012)	Position
US Country Songs (Billboard)	89

== Certifications ==
Region	Certification	Certified units/sales
United States (RIAA)	2× Platinum	2,000,000^{‡}
^{‡} Sales+streaming figures based on certification alone.
