= Shane Drake =

American music video and film director

Shane Clayton Drake
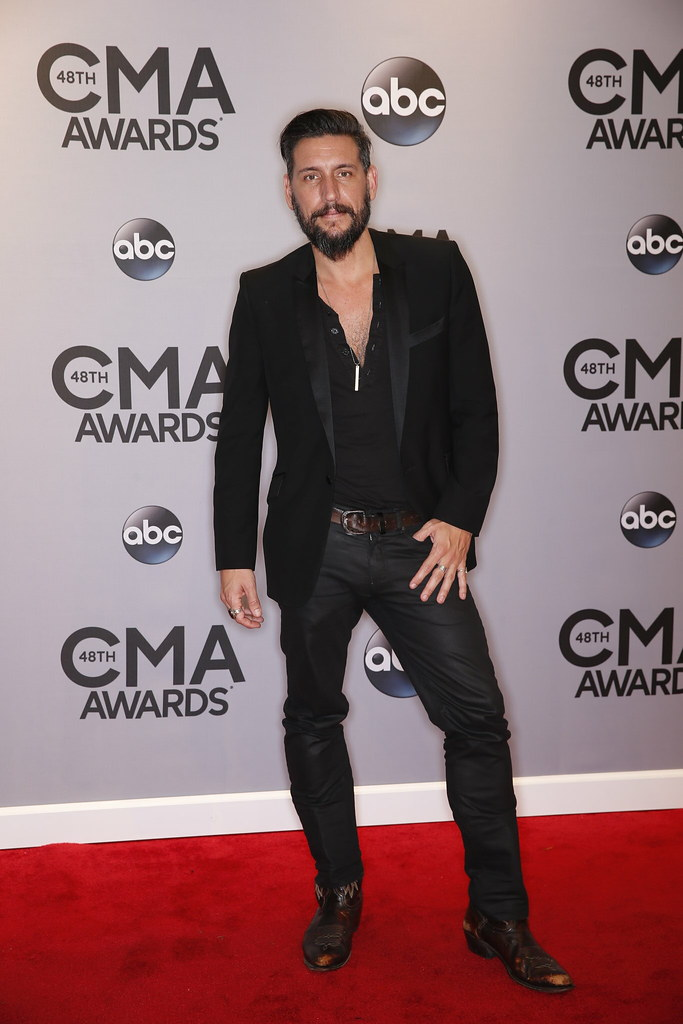
- Shane Drake in 2014
- Born: September 8, 1974 (age 51)
- Occupations: Music video director; director; editor
- Years active: 2001–present
- Website: saysopictures.com

Shane C. Drake (born September 8, 1974) is an American music video director and producer from Redding, California. He has directed videos for several acts in the music industry, including Kelly Clarkson, Carrie Underwood, Avril Lavigne, Trivium, Paramore, Fall Out Boy, Panic! at the Disco, Angels & Airwaves, Flo Rida, Timbaland, Blindside, The Red Jumpsuit Apparatus, The Almost, Hawthorne Heights, Subseven, and AJR. His directing credits include Panic! At the Disco: I Write Sins Not Tragedies (2006), Tim McGraw & Taylor Swift: Highway Don't Care (2013) and Paramore: Misery Business (2007).

== Early career ==
Early in his career, Drake spent time working as an editor and cinematographer with such bands as Poison the Well, Deftones, Thursday and many more. He now spends most of his time directing. Drake has directed videos for some of today's biggest acts. He owns Say So Pictures, a California-based production company.

== Awards ==
In 2006 Drake was awarded the MTV Video Music Award for Video of the Year for Panic! at the Disco's "I Write Sins Not Tragedies".

In 2007 Drake was nominated for the MTV Monster Single of the Year for his video for Timbaland's "The Way I Are". In 2008, he was nominated for MTV Video Music Award for Best Direction and MTV Video Music Award for Best Pop Video with Panic! at the Disco's "Nine in the Afternoon" and MTV Video Music Award for Best Rock Video with Paramore's "Crushcrushcrush" and also Fall Out Boy's cover of "Beat It". In 2009 Drake was nominated for the MTV Video Music Award for Best Rock Video for his video for Paramore's "Decode" from the Twilight film soundtrack album. In 2012, he was nominated for MTV Video Music Award for Best Video with a Message for Kelly Clarkson's "Dark Side".

At the 48th Academy of Country Music Awards Drake took home music video of the year for the Little Big Town song "Tornado" starring Johnathon Schaech.

In 2013 the "Highway Don't Care" film won Drake, Tim McGraw, Taylor Swift and Keith Urban the Country Music Association Award for Video of the Year.

Drake would go on to win two CMT awards in the coming years, one in 2015 for the Lady A music video for their song, "Bartender" starring Tony Hale and Kate Upton, the other in 2019 for the Carrie Underwood music video for her song "Love Wins".

== Music videography ==
Year	Artist	Video
2001	Subseven	"Emotion"
2002	mewithoutYou	"Bullet To Binary"
2004	Fall Out Boy	"Saturday"
2004	Hawthorne Heights	"Ohio Is For Lovers"
2004	mewithoutYou	"January 1979"
2004	Silverstein	"Smashed Into Pieces"
2004	The Beautiful Mistake	"This Is Who You Are"
2005	Paramore	"Pressure"
2005	My American Heart	"The Process"
2005	Blindside	"Fell In Love With The Game"
2005	Trivium	"A Gunshot to the Head of Trepidation"
2005	Still Remains	"The Worst Is Yet To Come"
2005	The Audition	"You've Made Us Conscious"
2005	June	"Patrick"
2005	Between The Buried And Me	"Alaska"
2005	Armor for Sleep	"Car Underwater"
2006	Showbread	"Oh! Emetophobia!"
2006	Mewithoutyou	"Nice And Blue (Part 2)"
2006	Gia Farrell	"Hit Me Up"
2006	Trick Daddy feat. Chamillionaire	"Bet That"
2006	Head Automatica	"Lying Through Your Teeth"
2006	Less Than Jake	"The Rest Of My Life"
2006	Gym Class Heroes	"The Queen And I"
2006	Paramore	"Emergency"
2006	An Angle	"Green Water"
2006	Moneen	"If Tragedy's Appealing, Then Disaster's An Addiction"
2006	Needtobreathe	"You Are Here"
2006	Panic! at the Disco	"But It's Better If You Do"
2006	Panic! at the Disco	"I Write Sins Not Tragedies"
2006	Jonezetta	"Get Ready (Hot Machete)"
2007	The Red Jumpsuit Apparatus	"False Pretense"
2007	The Red Jumpsuit Apparatus	"Your Guardian Angel"
2007	Paramore	"Misery Business"
2007	Paramore	"crushcrushcrush"
2007	The Almost	"Southern Weather"
2007	The Rocket Summer	"So Much Love"
2007	Say Anything starring Henry Winkler	"Wow, I Can Get Sexual Too"
2007	The Almost	"Say This Sooner"
2007	The Higher	"Insurance?"
2007	The Cheetah Girls	"So This Is Love"
2007	New Years Day	"I Was Right"
2007	Timbaland feat. Keri Hilson	"The Way I Are"
2007	Angels & Airwaves	"Everything's Magic"
2007	Plain White T's	"Our Time Now"
2007	Paul Van Dyk	"Let Go"
2008	Panic! at the Disco	"Nine in the Afternoon"
2008	Forever the Sickest Kids	"Whoa Oh! (Me vs. Everyone)"
2008	Fall Out Boy feat. John Mayer	"Beat It"
2008	Flo Rida feat. will.i.am	"In The Ayer"
2008	Shwayze	"Corona & Lime"
2008	Plain White T's starring Tiffany Dupont	"Natural Disaster"
2008	Paramore	"Decode"
2009	Madina Lake	"Never Take Us Alive"
2009	Flo Rida feat. Wynter Gordon	"Sugar"
2009	Darius Rucker	"History in the Making"
2009	The Almost	"Lonely Wheel"
2009	The Almost	"Hands"
2009	Honor Society	"Over You"
2010	Laura Bell Bundy	"Giddy On Up"
2010	Papa Roach	"Kick in the Teeth"
2010	Panic! At The Disco	"The Ballad of Mona Lisa"
2010	Panic! At The Disco	"The Overture"
2011	Avril Lavigne	"Smile"
2011	Panic! At the Disco	"Ready to Go (Get Me Out of My Mind)"
2011	Brantley Gilbert	"Country Must Be Country Wide"
2011	Paramore	"Monster"
2011	Scotty McCreery	"I Love You This Big"
2011	Justin Moore	"Bait a Hook"
2011	Drive A	"Let's Have a Wreck (Trainwreck)"
2011	Kelly Clarkson	"Stronger (What Doesn't Kill You)"
2012	Daughtry	"Outta My Head"
2012	Kelly Clarkson	"Dark Side"
2012	Three Days Grace	"Chalk Outline"
2012	Little Big Town starring Johnathon Schaech	"Tornado"
2012	Brantley Gilbert	"More Than Miles"
2012	L.P.	"Into the Wild"
2013	Lawson	"Learn to Love Again"
2013	Tegan and Sara	"I Was a Fool"
2013	Tim McGraw feat. Taylor Swift & Keith Urban	"Highway Don't Care"
2013	The Wanted	"Walks Like Rihanna"
2013	Avril Lavigne	"Here's To Never Growing Up"
2013	Tim McGraw	"Southern Girl"
2013	Danielle Bradbery	"The Heart of Dixie"
2013	Daughtry	"Waiting for Superman"
2013	Hunter Hayes feat. Jason Mraz	"Everybody's Got Somebody but Me"
2013	Brantley Gilbert	"Bottoms Up"
2013	The Cadillac Three	"The South"
2014	Brett Eldredge	"Beat of the Music"
2014	Haley & Michaels	"Just Another Love Song"
2014	Danielle Bradbery	"Young in America"
2014	A Day To Remember	"End of Me"
2014	Lady Antebellum starring Tony Hale and Kate Upton	"Bartender"
2014	Tim McGraw feat. Faith Hill	"Meanwhile Back at Mama's"
2014	Dustin Lynch	"Where It's At (Yep, Yep)"
2014	Justin Moore feat. Vince Neil	"Home Sweet Home"
2014	Brantley Gilbert feat. Justin Moore & Thomas Rhett	"Small Town Throwdown"
2014	Brett Eldredge	"Mean to Me"
2015	Brantley Gilbert	"One Hell of an Amen"
2015	Keith Urban	"John Cougar, John Deere, John 3:16"
2015	Brantley Gilbert	"Stone Cold Sober"
2015	G.E.M.	"Goodbye"
2016	Justin Moore	"You Look Like I Need a Drink"
2016	Brett Young	"Sleep Without You"
2016	Colette Carr	"Play House"
2016	Hillary Scott & the Scott Family	"Thy Will"
2016	Luke Bryan	"Move"
2016	Carrie Underwood	"Dirty Laundry"
2016	Kacey Musgraves	"What Are You Doing New Year's Eve?"
2016	Jennifer Nettles	"Hey Heartbreak"
2017	AJR	"Weak"
2017	Yo Gotti	"Juice"
2018	Ella Mai	"Trip"
2018	Tim McGraw	"Neon Church"
2018	Yo Gotti feat. Chris Brown	"Save It For Me"
2018	Carrie Underwood	"Love Wins"
2019	Kelsea Ballerini	"Miss Me More"
2020	Kelsea Ballerini	"Homecoming Queen?"
2021	Donnie Osmond	"Who"
2022	Parmalee	"Take My Hand"
2025	The Red Jumpsuit Apparatus	"Perfection"

== Awards and honors ==
Year	Category	Nominated work	Result	Ref.
2006	MTV Video Music Award for Video of the Year	"I Write Sins Not Tragedies" by Panic! At The Disco	Won	
2006	MTV Video Music Award for Best Rock Video	"I Write Sins Not Tragedies" by Panic! At The Disco	Nominated	
2006	MTV Video Music Award for Best New Artist	"I Write Sins Not Tragedies" by Panic! At The Disco	Nominated	
2006	MTV Video Music Award for Best Group Video	"I Write Sins Not Tragedies" by Panic! At The Disco	Nominated	
2006	MTV Video Music Award for Best Group Video	"I Write Sins Not Tragedies" by Panic! At The Disco	Nominated	
2007	MTV Video Music Award for Monster Single of the Year	"The Way I Are" by Timbaland (featuring) Keri Hilson	Nominated	
2008	MTV Video Music Award for Best Rock Video	"Crushcrushcrush" by Paramore	Nominated	
2008	MTV Video Music Award for Best Rock Video	"Beat It" by Fall Out Boy (featuring) John Mayer	Nominated	
2008	MTV Video Music Award for Best Pop Video	"Nine In The Afternoon" by Panic! At The Disco	Nominated	
2008	MTV Video Music Award for Best Direction	"Nine In The Afternoon" by Panic! At The Disco	Nominated	
2009	MTV Video Music Award for Best Rock Video	"Decode" by Paramore (from the movie) Twilight	Nominated	
2012	MTV Video Music Award for Best Video with a Message	"Dark Side" by Kelly Clarkson	Nominated	
2013	Country Music Association Award for Video of the Year	"Highway Don't Care" by Tim McGraw feat. Taylor Swift & Keith Urban	Won	
2013	Country Music Association Award for Video of the Year	"Tornado" by Little Big Town (starring) Johnathon Schaech	Nominated	
2013	Academy of Country Music Awards for Video of the Year	"Tornado" by Little Big Town (starring) Johnathon Schaech	Won	
2014	Academy of Country Music Awards for Video of the Year	"Highway Don't Care" by Tim McGraw feat. Taylor Swift & Keith Urban	Won	
2015	CMT Music Award for Best Group Video	"Bartender" by Lady Antebellum	Won	
2016	CMT Music Award for Best Male Video	"John Cougar, John Deere, John 3:16" by Keith Urban	Nominated	
2019	MTV Video Music Award for Best R&B Video	"Trip" by Ella Mai	Nominated	
2019	CMT Music Awards for Video of the Year	"Love Wins" by Carrie Underwood	Won	
2023	CMT Music Awards for Duo/Group Video of The Year	"Take My Name" by Parmalee	Nominated	
