= One Hell of an Amen =

Single by Brantley Gilbert

from the album Just as I Am
- Released: November 10, 2014
- Recorded: 2013–14
- Genre: Country rock
- Length: 3:42
- Label: Valory
- Songwriter(s): Brantley Gilbert; Mike Dekle; Brian Davis
- Producer(s): Dann Huff

Brantley Gilbert singles chronology
"Small Town Throwdown" (2014)	"One Hell of an Amen" (2014)	"Stone Cold Sober" (2015)

"One Hell of an Amen" is a song co-written and recorded by American country rock singer Brantley Gilbert. It was released in November 2014 as the third single from his third studio album Just as I Am. The song was written by Gilbert, along with Mike Dekle and Brian Davis.

== Background ==
Gilbert revealed that the song is based on a true story regarding the death of a US military soldier who was like a brother to one of his close friends.

== Content ==
The song is about the loss of loved ones, using "a soldier who's a cancer victim" as an example.

== Critical reception ==
Giving it a B+, Bob Paxman of Country Weekly wrote that "Brantley's low-key, heartfelt delivery, along with straightforward lyrics that aren't trying to make a statement, dispel any notion of pandering", although he criticized the "crunchy and overloaded" production. A less favorable review came from Kevin John Coyne of Country Universe, who rated the song a "D" criticizing the weak songwriting as well as the lack of emotion in Gilbert's vocals, writing that "I actually feel kind of bad for Brantley Gilbert. His heart is totally in the right place. But the execution is absolutely horrendous. Attempting to tackle two different tragedies in one song – a fallen soldier and death by cancer – and fails to stumble upon any truth in either individual situation, let alone a compelling connection between the two." and "His monotonous delivery doesn’t help matters, but the song was beyond saving anyway."

== Music video ==
The music video was directed by Shane Drake and premiered in January 2015.

== Chart performance ==
The song reached No. 1 on the Country Airplay chart in its 37th week of release (chart dated August 8, 2015). It is his fourth No. 1 on the chart. The song has sold 428,000 copies in the US as of September 2015.

Chart (2014–2015)	Peak position
Canada (Canadian Hot 100)	80
Canada Country (Billboard)	16
US Billboard Hot 100	44
US Country Airplay (Billboard)	1
US Hot Country Songs (Billboard)	5

=== Year-end charts ===
Chart (2015)	Position
US Country Airplay (Billboard)	16
US Hot Country Songs (Billboard)	29

== Certifications ==
Region	Certification	Certified units/sales
United States (RIAA)	Gold	428,000
