= The Ones That Like Me =

Single by Brantley Gilbert

from the album The Devil Don't Sleep
- Released: June 12, 2017
- Genre: Country
- Length: 3:25
- Label: Valory
- Songwriter(s): Brantley Gilbert; Bobby Pinson; Blake Chaffin
- Producer(s): Dann Huff

Brantley Gilbert singles chronology
"The Weekend" (2016)	"The Ones That Like Me" (2017)	"What Happens in a Small Town" (2019)

"The Ones That Like Me" is a song recorded by American country music singer Brantley Gilbert, written by himself along with Bobby Pinson and Blake Chaffin. It is the second single from his fourth major-label album, The Devil Don't Sleep.

== Content ==
Gilbert says that the song is "just, straight-ahead, me in a nutshell". The song features a "mellow vibe" in which Gilbert sings about confiding in those who know him. The song's eponymous tour, The Ones That Like Me Tour, began on February 1, 2018.

== Music video ==
The music video features footage of Gilbert riding his motorcycle and having a get-together with his family. His wife, Amber, is also featured in the video.

== Charts ==
=== Weekly charts ===
Chart (2017–2018)	Peak position
US Bubbling Under Hot 100 (Billboard)	21
US Hot Country Songs (Billboard)	22
US Country Airplay (Billboard)	15

=== Year-end charts ===
Chart (2018)	Position
US Hot Country Songs (Billboard)	78
