= What Happens in a Small Town =

Single by Brantley Gilbert and Lindsay Ell

from the album Fire & Brimstone
- Released: January 14, 2019
- Genre: Country
- Length: 3:23
- Label: Valory
- Songwriters: Brantley Gilbert; Rhett Akins; Brock Berryhill; Josh Dunne
- Producer: Dann Huff

Brantley Gilbert singles chronology
"The Ones That Like Me" (2017)	"What Happens in a Small Town" (2019)	"Fire't Up" (2019)

Lindsay Ell singles chronology
"Champagne" (2018)	"What Happens in a Small Town" (2019)	"I Don't Love You" (2019)

"What Happens in a Small Town" is a song recorded by American country rock artist Brantley Gilbert and Canadian country music artist Lindsay Ell. It was released on January 14, 2019, as the lead single from Gilbert's fifth studio album, Fire & Brimstone.

== History ==
Gilbert said that he wrote a song and presented it to Scott Borchetta, the president of his label, but was uncertain of its potential as a hit single. As a result, he contacted Rhett Akins and co-writers Brock Berryhill and Josh Dunne, saying that they wanted an "uptempo feel-good radio song". As they wanted the song to be a duet with a female artist, Gilbert asked Borchetta for recommendations, and he suggested Lindsay Ell.

== Charts ==
=== Weekly charts ===
Chart (2019)	Peak position
Australia Country Hot 50 (TMN)	33
Canada Country (Billboard)	15
Canada Digital Songs (Billboard)	39
US Billboard Hot 100	53
US Hot Country Songs (Billboard)	7
US Country Airplay (Billboard)	1

=== Year-end charts ===
Chart (2019)	Position
US Country Airplay (Billboard)	3
US Hot Country Songs (Billboard)	18

== Certifications ==
Certifications for "What Happens in a Small Town"
Region	Certification	Certified units/sales
United States (RIAA)	Platinum	1,000,000^{‡}
^{‡} Sales+streaming figures based on certification alone.
