= Just as I Am (Brantley Gilbert album) =

Studio album by Brantley Gilbert
- Released: May 19, 2014
- Recorded: 2013–14
- Genre: Country rock; rock
- Length: 45:09
- Label: Valory
- Producer: Dann Huff; Scott Borchetta (exec.)

Brantley Gilbert chronology
Halfway to Heaven (2010)	Just as I Am (2014)	The Devil Don't Sleep (2017)

Singles from Just as I Am
- 1. "Bottoms Up" Released: December 17, 2013; 2. "Small Town Throwdown" Released: May 19, 2014; 3. "One Hell of an Amen" Released: November 10, 2014; 4. "Stone Cold Sober" Released: August 31, 2015

Cover for deluxe edition

Cover for platinum edition

Just as I Am is the third studio album by American country rock singer Brantley Gilbert. It was released on May 19, 2014 via Valory Music Group. The album includes the number one singles "Bottoms Up" and "One Hell of an Amen". Gilbert wrote or co-wrote all 11 tracks.

== Critical reception ==
Professional ratings
Review scores
Source	Rating
AllMusic	4/5 stars
Country Weekly	A
Digital Journal	4.5/5 stars
Roughstock	3.5/5 stars
USA Today	2/4 stars

Just as I Am met with generally positive reception from music critics. At AllMusic, Stephen Thomas Erlewine rated the album four stars out of five, writing that Gilbert is "an outlaw with no desire to rebel, an insider who doesn't belong, so his music exists just outside the perimeters of what is accepted and is all the more powerful for it." Brian Mansfield of USA Today rated the album two stars out of four, stating that " Coupling '80s-rock machismo with backroads buzzwords, these songs play like set-list padding." At Country Weekly, Tammy Ragusa graded the album an A, calling this "a much more mature album and the exact collection he needed to secure his place in the history and future of country music." Markos Papadatos of Digital Journal rated the album four-and-a-half stars out of five, remarking how on a release that shows his further refinement "as a vocalist and as a songwriter", Gilbert makes it clear on a musical project where "nothing [is] fake about him and there are no apologies on this record." At The New York Times, Jon Caramanica gave a positive review of the album, saying that Gilbert "is a lunk with poet dreams, a bodybuilder cradling a newborn" because he "certainly [has] an intimate understanding of how his hard exterior allows him to flaunt softness when it's called for." Matt Bjorke of Roughstock rated the album three-and-a-half stars out of five, indicating how this "is a confident, well-made album with much of what has made Brantley Gilbert the big rising star that he is and will keep his massive fan base completely happy." Mike Johnston, former Host Echo bassist, has called Bottoms Up "an inspiration for an entire generation."

== Commercial performance ==
The album debuted at No. 2 behind Coldplay's album Ghost Stories on the Billboard 200, and No. 1 on the Top Country Albums chart with 211,000 copies sold in the US. The album was certified Gold by the RIAA on June 30, 2014, and Platinum on May 18, 2016. As of January 2017, the album has sold 1,021,400 copies in the US.

== Track listing ==
No.	Title	Writer(s)	Length
1.	"If You Want a Bad Boy"	Brantley Gilbert; Troy Verges	3:31
2.	"17 Again"	Gilbert; Ben Hayslip; Rhett Akins	3:59
3.	"Bottoms Up"	Gilbert; Brett James; Justin Weaver	3:41
4.	"That Was Us"	Gilbert	3:47
5.	"I'm Gone"	Gilbert; Wendell Mobley; Tony Martin	3:34
6.	"My Baby's Guns N' Roses"	Gilbert; Brian Davis; David Tolliver	3:33
7.	"Lights of My Hometown"	Gilbert; Davis; Forrest Whitehead	6:10
8.	"One Hell of an Amen"	Gilbert; Mike Dekle; Davis	3:42
9.	"Small Town Throwdown" (featuring Justin Moore and Thomas Rhett)	Gilbert; Hayslip; Akins; Dallas Davidson	3:22
10.	"Let It Ride"	Gilbert	4:37
11.	"My Faith in You"	Gilbert; Jeremy Spillman	5:10
Total length:			45:09

Deluxe Edition (Walmart exclusive)
No.	Title	Writer(s)	Length
12.	"G.R.I.T.S."	Gilbert	3:53
13.	"Read Me My Rights"	Gilbert; Davis; Jess Franklin	3:56
14.	"Grown Ass Man"	Gilbert	4:58

Platinum Edition
No.	Title	Writer(s)	Length
15.	"Bottoms Up (remix)" (featuring T.I.)	Gilbert; James; T.I.; Weaver	3:42
16.	"Do What the Night Wants"	Gilbert; Akins; Hayslip	3:13
17.	"Stone Cold Sober"	Gilbert; James; Dan Layus	3:52
18.	"Same Old Song"	Gilbert; Davis; Ashley Gorley	3:47
19.	"Just as I Am"	Gilbert	4:04

== Personnel ==
- Robert Bailey – choir on "Lights of My Hometown" and "My Faith in You"
- J. Bonilla – loop programming
- Eric Darken – percussion
- Everett Drake – choir on "Lights of My Hometown" and "My Faith in You"
- Jason Eskridge – choir on "Lights of My Hometown" and "My Faith in You"
- Jess Franklin – dobro, electric guitar
- Paul Franklin – steel guitar
- Brantley Gilbert – acoustic guitar, lead vocals
- Vicki Hampton – choir on "Lights of My Hometown" and "My Faith in You"
- Kyla Harris – choir on "Lights of My Hometown" and "My Faith in You"
- Wes Hightower – background vocals, choir on "Lights of My Hometown" and "My Faith in You"
- Dann Huff – bouzouki, acoustic guitar, electric guitar
- David Huff – loop programming
- Elliot Huff – drums
- Charlie Judge – Hammond B-3 organ, keyboards, piano, synthesizer
- Chris McHugh – drums
- John Merlino – electric guitar
- Justin Moore – vocals on "Small Town Throwdown"
- Gordon Mote – piano
- Wendy Moten – choir on "Lights of My Hometown" and "My Faith in You"
- Thomas Rhett – vocals on "Small Town Throwdown"
- Ben Sims – drums
- Jonathan Waggonner – bass guitar
- Jonathan Yudkin – string composer, string arrangements, and strings on "Bottoms Up"

== Charts and certifications ==
=== Weekly charts ===
Chart (2014–15)	Peak position
Canadian Albums (Billboard)	8
US Billboard 200	2
US Top Country Albums (Billboard)	1

=== Year-end charts ===
Chart (2014)	Position
US Billboard 200	16
US Top Country Albums (Billboard)	5
Chart (2015)	Position
US Billboard 200	55
US Top Country Albums (Billboard)	12
Chart (2016)	Position
US Top Country Albums (Billboard)	48
Chart (2017)	Position
US Top Country Albums (Billboard)	100

=== Singles ===
Year	Single	Peak chart positions				
Year	Single	US Country	US Country Airplay	US	CAN Country	CAN
2013	"Bottoms Up"	1	1	20	3	41
2014	"Small Town Throwdown"	13	8	67	24	97
2014	"One Hell of an Amen"	5	1	44	16	80
2015	"Stone Cold Sober"	23	18	108	49	—
"—" denotes releases that did not chart

=== Decade-end charts ===
Chart (2010–2019)	Position
US Billboard 200	141
US Top Country Albums (Billboard)	25

=== Certifications ===
Region	Certification	Certified units/sales
United States (RIAA)	Platinum	1,021,400
