= So Help Me God (Brantley Gilbert album) =

Studio album by Brantley Gilbert
- Released: November 10, 2022
- Genre: Country
- Length: 31:31
- Label: Valory
- Producer: DJ Chill

Brantley Gilbert chronology
Fire & Brimstone (2019)	So Help Me God (2022)	Tattoos (2024)

Singles from So Help Me God
- 1. "The Worst Country Song of All Time" Released: June 18, 2021; 2. "Heaven by Then" Released: November 10, 2022

So Help Me God is the sixth studio album by American country rock artist Brantley Gilbert. It was released on November 10, 2022, via Big Machine Records’ Valory imprint. The album includes the singles "The Worst Country Song of All Time", featuring Hardy and Toby Keith and "Heaven by Then" featuring Blake Shelton and Vince Gill. A deluxe edition of the album featuring the promotional single "Bury Me Upside Down" was released on April 21, 2023.

== Content ==
The album is Gilbert's sixth overall, and his fourth for the Valory imprint of Big Machine Records, to which he has been signed since 2011. It features ten total tracks, with an extra five included on the deluxe edition. Vocal collaborators on the album include Blake Shelton, Vince Gill, Jason Aldean, Hardy, Toby Keith, and Jelly Roll. In "The Worst Country Song of All Time" music video, actors dress up as politicians including former President Donald Trump, Hillary Clinton, and Kim Jong Un.

== Release ==
So Help Me God received several singles before release, in the form of official and promotional. The first single from the album, "The Worst Country Song of All Time" was released on June 18, 2021. It was followed by the promotional single, "Gone But Not Forgotten", on September 17, 2021. Another promotional single, "How to Talk to Girls", was released in November 2021. The third promotional single, "Rolex on a Redneck" featuring fellow country artist Jason Aldean, was released in March 2022. In June 2022, Gilbert teamed up with Jelly Roll for the fourth promotional single, "Son of the Dirty South", which charted on multiple Billboard charts. Gilbert released the album in November 2022, along with the second official single, "Heaven by Then" featuring Blake Shelton and Vince Gill.

=== Deluxe edition ===
The deluxe edition was released in April 2023 along with the fifth promotional single from the album, "Bury Me Upside Down". It contains five new tracks.

== Track listing ==
So Help Me God track listing
No.	Title	Writer(s)	Length
1.	"Heaven by Then" (featuring Blake Shelton and Vince Gill)	Brock Berryhill; Brantley Gilbert; Michael Hardy; Jake Mitchell; Randy Montana; Hunter Phelps; Taylor Phillips	3:02
2.	"Rolex on a Redneck" (featuring Jason Aldean)	Berryhill; Gilbert; Hardy; Montana; Phillips	2:59
3.	"Miles of Memories"	Berryhill; Gilbert; Josh Phillips	3:10
4.	"She's the One"	Berryhill; Gilbert; T. Phillips	3:31
5.	"The Worst Country Song of All Time" (featuring Hardy and Toby Keith)	Gilbert; Hardy; Phelps; Will Weatherly	3:17
6.	"Son of the Dirty South" (featuring Jelly Roll)	Andrew Baylis; Jason DeFord; Gilbert	2:59
7.	"How to Talk to Girls"	Berryhill; Brian Davis; Brandon Day; Gilbert; Chase McGill; J. Phillips; T. Phillips; Michael Ray	3:20
8.	"Little Piece of Heaven"	Berryhill; Gilbert; Greylan James; T. Phillips; Cole Taylor	2:57
9.	"Gone But Not Forgotten"	Berryhill; Jason Blaine; Jay Brunswick; Gilbert	2:53
10.	"So Help Me God"	Gilbert; Hardy; Phelps; Weatherly	3:14
Total length:			31:31

Deluxe edition bonus tracks
No.	Title	Writer(s)	Length
11.	"Wrote the Book Around Here"	Gilbert; Phelps; Phillips; Weatherly	2:52
12.	"Tailgates of Heaven"	Derek George; Gilbert; Phillips	3:55
13.	"Bury Me Upside Down"	Berryhill; Davis; Day; Gilbert; McGill; Phillips; Ray	2:49
14.	"All Over the Map"	Gilbert; Montana; Phillips; Weatherly	3:24
15.	"Behind the Times"	Gilbert; Jake Mitchell; Montana; Phillips	3:21
Total length:			47:56

== Charts ==
Chart performance for So Help Me God
Chart (2022)	Peak position
US Independent Albums (Billboard)	44
US Top Country Albums (Billboard)	32
US Top Current Album Sales (Billboard)	60
