= More Than Miles =

Single by Brantley Gilbert

from the album Halfway to Heaven
- Released: October 15, 2012
- Recorded: 2011
- Genre: Country rock
- Length: 4:12
- Label: Valory
- Songwriters: Brantley Gilbert; John Eddie
- Producer: Dann Huff

Brantley Gilbert singles chronology
| "Kick It in the Sticks" (2012) | "More Than Miles" (2012) | "Bottoms Up" (2013) |

"More Than Miles" is a song recorded by American country rock singer Brantley Gilbert. It was released in October 2012 as the fourth single from the deluxe edition of his 2010 album Halfway to Heaven. The song was written by Gilbert and John Eddie.

== Critical reception ==
Billy Dukes of Taste of Country gave the song four stars out of five, calling it "a tightly-packaged personal story that quickly resonates with anyone who’s broken a heart." Matt Bjorke of Roughstock gave the song a favorable review, writing that "[Dann] Huff keeps his rock vibe while making Brantley's love it or hate it vocals sound better than he's sounded on any other single thus far into his career."

== Music video ==
The music video was directed by Shane Drake and premiered in December 2012.

== Chart performance ==
"More Than Miles" debuted at number 53 on the U.S. Billboard Country Airplay chart for the week of November 3, 2012. It also debuted at number 49 on the U.S. Billboard Hot Country Songs chart for the week of January 5, 2013. It also debuted at number 98 on the U.S. Billboard Hot 100 chart for the week of March 16, 2013. It peaked at number 7 on the Country Airplay chart.

| Chart (2012–2013) | Peak position |
|---|---|
| Canada Country (Billboard) | 33 |
| US Billboard Hot 100 | 73 |
| US Country Airplay (Billboard) | 7 |
| US Hot Country Songs (Billboard) | 21 |

=== Year-end charts ===
| Chart (2013) | Position |
|---|---|
| US Country Airplay (Billboard) | 20 |
| US Hot Country Songs (Billboard) | 48 |

== Certifications ==
| Region | Certification | Certified units/sales |
|---|---|---|
| United States (RIAA) | Gold | 500,000^{‡} |
^{‡} Sales+streaming figures based on certification alone.
