= Stone Cold Sober (Brantley Gilbert song) =

Single by Brantley Gilbert

from the album Just as I Am
- Released: August 31, 2015
- Recorded: 2015
- Genre: Country rock
- Length: 3:52
- Label: Valory
- Songwriters: Brantley Gilbert; Brett James; Dan Layus
- Producer: Dann Huff

Brantley Gilbert singles chronology
| "One Hell of an Amen" (2014) | "Stone Cold Sober" (2015) | "The Weekend" (2016) |

"Stone Cold Sober" is a song co-written and recorded by American country rock singer Brantley Gilbert. It was released in August 2015 as the fourth single from his third studio album Just as I Am. It was only included in the platinum edition of the album. The song was written by Gilbert, Brett James and Dan Layus.

== Critical reception ==
An uncredited Taste of Country review stated that "'Stone Cold Sober' is a songwriter's showcase that fans will need to dive into to fully appreciate. There's nothing hooky about the track, but one only needs to go as far as his last single — the chart-topping 'One Hell of an Amen' — to see this works for the just-married singer from Georgia."

== Commercial performance ==
The song debuted at No. 50 on Hot Country Songs on the release of the Just as I Am album in May 2015, and No. 33 on Country Digital Songs chart, selling over 10,000 copies in its first week. The song entered the Country Airplay chart at No. 58 for chart dated September 19, 2015 after it was released as a single. The song has sold 172,000 copies in the US as of May 2016.

== Music video ==
The music video was directed by Shane Drake and premiered in December 2015.

== Chart performance ==
=== Weekly charts ===
| Chart (2015–2016) | Peak position |
|---|---|
| Canada Country (Billboard) | 49 |
| US Bubbling Under Hot 100 (Billboard) | 8 |
| US Country Airplay (Billboard) | 18 |
| US Hot Country Songs (Billboard) | 23 |

=== Year-end charts ===
| Chart (2016) | Position |
|---|---|
| US Hot Country Songs (Billboard) | 77 |

== Certifications ==
| Region | Certification | Certified units/sales |
|---|---|---|
| United States (RIAA) | Gold | 500,000^{‡} |
^{‡} Sales+streaming figures based on certification alone.
