= John Eddie (album) =

Studio album by John Eddie
- Released: 1986
- Genre: Rock
- Label: Columbia

John Eddie chronology
| John Eddie (1986) | The Hard Cold Truth (1989) |

John Eddie is the debut album by American rock musician John Eddie, released in 1986. Eddie is backed by members of Bruce Springsteen's E Street Band.

The album features the hit single "Jungle Boy", which peaked at No. 52 on the Billboard Hot 100 and No. 17 on the Top Rock Tracks chart in the US. In addition, a music video filmed in black and white featuring Eddie dancing was filmed for "Jungle Boy".

== Track listing ==
John Eddie
| No. | Title | Length |
|---|---|---|
| 1. | "Dream House" | 3:10 |
| 2. | "Pretty Little Rebel" | 3:13 |
| 3. | "Hide Out" | 4:59 |
| 4. | "Just Some Guy" | 3:22 |
| 5. | "Please Jodi" | 4:06 |
| 6. | "Cool Walk" | 2:45 |
| 7. | "Jungle Boy" | 3:23 |
| 8. | "Stranded" | 4:10 |
| 9. | "Waste Me" | 3:30 |
| 10. | "Romance" | 4:03 |
| 11. | "Buster" | 4:49 |
| 12. | "Living Doll" | 2:04 |
| 13. | "Mary's Ghost (2007 CD Reissue Bonus Track)" | 3:07 |
| 14. | "Waste Me (Live) (2007 CD Reissue Bonus Track)" | 3:52 |
