= Small Town Throwdown =

Single by Brantley Gilbert featuring Justin Moore and Thomas Rhett

from the album Just as I Am
- Released: May 19, 2014
- Recorded: 2013–14
- Genre: Country
- Length: 3:22
- Label: Valory
- Songwriters: Brantley Gilbert; Ben Hayslip; Rhett Akins; Dallas Davidson
- Producer: Dann Huff

Brantley Gilbert singles chronology
"Bottoms Up" (2013)	"Small Town Throwdown" (2014)	"One Hell of an Amen" (2014)

Justin Moore singles chronology
"Lettin' the Night Roll" (2013)	"Small Town Throwdown" (2014)	"Home Sweet Home" (2014)

Thomas Rhett singles chronology
"Get Me Some of That" (2013)	"Small Town Throwdown" (2014)	"Make Me Wanna" (2014)

"Small Town Throwdown" is a song co-written and recorded by American country rock singer Brantley Gilbert as a collaboration with Justin Moore and Thomas Rhett. It was released in May 2014 as the second single from his third studio album Just as I Am. The song has sold 417,000 copies in the U.S. as of October 2014.

== Critical reception ==
An uncredited Taste of Country review stated that "The song — penned by Gilbert and the Peach Pickers — is built to be performed live. Raw energy will make it a hit, as the four aren’t breaking new ground lyrically. For all the talk of a more sentimental album after one or two high-profile news events in Gilbert’s life, the first two singles seem to introduce a very loud, rebellious record. That’s likely a relief to fans who save money all year to see him take the stage."

== Music video ==
The music video was directed by Shane Drake and premiered in August 2014. UFC Hall of Famer Chuck Liddell plays a supporting role as the boss from hell.

== Chart performance ==
Chart (2014)	Peak position
Canada Hot 100 (Billboard)	97
Canada Country (Billboard)	24
US Billboard Hot 100	67
US Country Airplay (Billboard)	8
US Hot Country Songs (Billboard)	13

=== Year-end charts ===
Chart (2014)	Position
US Country Airplay (Billboard)	16
US Hot Country Songs (Billboard)	36

== Certifications ==
Region	Certification	Certified units/sales
United States (RIAA)	Gold	417,000
