= The Worst Country Song of All Time =

Single by Brantley Gilbert featuring Hardy and Toby Keith

from the album So Help Me God
- Released: June 21, 2021
- Genre: Country rock
- Length: 3:17
- Label: Valory
- Songwriters: Brantley Gilbert; Michael Hardy; Hunter Phelps; Will Weatherly
- Producer: DJ Chill

Brantley Gilbert singles chronology
"Hard Days" (2020)	"The Worst Country Song of All Time" (2021)	"Heaven by Then" (2022)

Hardy singles chronology
"Give Heaven Some Hell" (2021)	"The Worst Country Song of All Time" (2021)	"Wait in the Truck" (2022)

Toby Keith singles chronology
"Old School" (2021)	"The Worst Country Song of All Time" (2021)	"Oklahoma Breakdown" (2022)

Music video
- "The Worst Country Song of All Time" on YouTube

"The Worst Country Song of All Time" is a song by American country rock singer Brantley Gilbert featuring Hardy and Toby Keith. It was released on June 21, 2021 as the lead single from Gilbert's seventh studio album, So Help Me God. The song peaked at 31 on the US Billboard Hot Country Songs chart.

== Content ==
Written by Gilbert and Hardy, the entire song references things considered "not country", including loving cities, hating sweet tea, and being "too good for solo cups" (referencing Toby Keith's song, "Red Solo Cup"; the lyric is sung by Keith). The song's conception was originally from a joke Hardy made to Gilbert, Hunter Phelps, and Will Weatherly about writing the worst song of all time. Eventually the song was cut and recorded and featured a verse from legendary country artist, Toby Keith.

== Commercial performance ==
"The Worst Country Song of All Time" reached number 31 on the US Billboard Hot Country Songs chart, as well as number 32 on the Country Airplay chart.

== Charts ==
Chart performance for "The Worst Country Song of All Time"
Chart (2021)	Peak position
US Digital Song Sales (Billboard)	28
US Country Airplay (Billboard)	32
US Hot Country Songs (Billboard)	31
