= Tattoos (Brantley Gilbert album) =

Studio album by Brantley Gilbert
- Released: September 13, 2024
- Studios: Sound Stage (Nashville); Starlight (Mount Juliet); Pump House (Franklin); Sound Kitchen (Franklin); Blackbird (Nashville)
- Genre: Country rock
- Length: 33:12
- Label: Valory
- Producers: Brock Berryhill; Brantley Gilbert

Brantley Gilbert chronology
So Help Me God (2022)	Tattoos (2024)	Greatest Hits...So Far (2025)

Singles from Tattoos
- 1. "Over When We're Sober" Released: June 20, 2024

Tattoos is the seventh studio album by the American country rock singer Brantley Gilbert. It was released on September 13, 2024, via Valory Music Co. The album was preceded by the single "Over When We're Sober" featuring Ashley Cooke, and the promotional singles "Off the Rails", "Me and My House" featuring Struggle Jennings and Demun Jones, and "Dirty Money" featuring Justin Moore.

== Content ==
Gilbert announced the album on July 17, 2024. It is his seventh studio album, and was released on September 13, 2024. Vocal collaborators include Justin Moore, Ashley Cooke, Struggle Jennings, Demun Jones, and Gary LeVox of Rascal Flatts.

== Track listing ==
Tattoos track listing
No.	Title	Writer(s)	Length
1.	"Dirty Money" (featuring Justin Moore)	Brantley Gilbert; Josh Phillips	4:20
2.	"Over When We're Sober" (featuring Ashley Cooke)	Gilbert; Brock Berryhill; Jason DeFord; Justin Wilson	3:08
3.	"Tattoos"	Gilbert; Jake Mitchell; Randy Montana; Cole Taylor	3:34
4.	"Gone by Now"	Gilbert; John Byron; Taylor Phillips; Ryan Vojtesak	2:51
5.	"Off the Rails"	Gilbert; Berryhill; Brian Davis; Brandon Day; Chase McGill; J. Phillips; T. Phillips; Michael Ray	3:05
6.	"The Hell That Raised Us"	Gilbert; Byron; Devin Dawson	3:21
7.	"Me and My House" (featuring Struggle Jennings and Demun Jones)	Gilbert; Struggle Jennings; Matthew David Jones; Berryhill; Byron; Blake Pendergrass	3:44
8.	"God Isn't Country" (featuring Gary LeVox)	Gilbert; Berryhill; Ned Cameron; Jaxson Free; Jacob Hackworth; T. Phillips	3:28
9.	"Out Here"	Gilbert; Berryhill; Gabe Foust; Free; T. Phillips	2:41
10.	"Miss These Towns"	Gilbert; Berryhill; Free; Ashley Gorley; T. Phillips	3:04
Total length:			33:12

== Personnel ==
Credits are adapted from the album's liner notes.

=== Musicians ===
- Brantley Gilbert – vocals (all tracks), background vocals (tracks 1, 2, 4, 6–8), gang vocals (5)
- Brock Berryhill – background vocals (all tracks), programming (tracks 1, 3, 5–10), percussion (1, 4, 6, 7), electric guitar (2, 3, 5, 9), bass (2, 10), acoustic guitar (2), gang vocals (5); synthesizer, drums (7)
- Nathan Keeterle – electric guitar (tracks 1–9), bass (5)
- Justin Schipper – steel guitar (tracks 1–6, 8, 9), Dobro (1, 3–6, 8, 9), electric guitar (3)
- Alex Wright – B-3 organ (tracks 1–3, 5–10), piano (1–3, 6–8, 10), synthesizer (2–7, 10), bass (2), Wurlitzer (4, 9), keyboards (5)
- Miles McPherson – drums (tracks 1, 4–6, 8, 9), percussion (1, 4, 6, 8)
- Tim Galloway – acoustic guitar (tracks 1, 4, 6, 8, 9)
- Mark Hill – bass (tracks 1, 4, 6, 8, 9)
- Dylan Marlowe – background vocals (track 1)
- Justin Moore – vocals (track 1)
- Ilya Toshinskiy – acoustic guitar (tracks 2, 7, 10); dulcimer, banjo (2); Dobro (7, 10), electric guitar (10)
- Ashley Cooke – vocals (track 2)
- Jessi Alexander – background vocals (track 2)
- Sarah Buxton – background vocals (track 2)
- Aaron Sterling – drums (track 2)
- Jake Mitchell – acoustic guitar, gut-string acoustic guitar, high-strung acoustic guitar, electric guitar, programming, background vocals (track 3)
- Andrew Baylis – bass, programming (track 5)
- Brian Davis – gang vocals (track 5)
- Brandon Day – gang vocals (track 5)
- Chase McGill – gang vocals (track 5)
- Josh Phillips – gang vocals (track 5)
- Taylor Phillips – gang vocals (track 5)
- Michael Ray – gang vocals (track 5)
- Devin Dawson – electric guitar (track 6)
- Struggle Jennings – vocals (track 7)
- Demun Jones – vocals (track 7)
- Gary LeVox – vocals (track 8)

=== Technical and visuals ===
- Brock Berryhill – production (all tracks), recording (tracks 2, 3, 5, 7, 10), digital editing (1–4, 6–10), additional recording (1, 4, 6, 8, 9)
- Brantley Gilbert – production
- Jake Mitchell – production (track 3)
- Andrew Baylis – production, additional recording (track 5)
- Scott Borchetta – executive production
- Kam Luchterhand – recording (tracks 1, 4, 6, 8, 9)
- Alex Wright – additional recording (tracks 2, 3, 5, 7, 10)
- Nathan Keeterle – additional recording (tracks 2, 3, 5, 7)
- Ilya Toshinskiy – additional recording (tracks 2, 7, 10)
- Aaron Sterling – additional recording (track 2)
- Justin Schipper – additional recording (tracks 3, 5)
- Jake Mitchell – additional recording (track 3)
- Miles McPherson – additional recording (track 5)
- Jimmy Robbins – Ashley Cooke vocal production (track 2)
- Casey Sabol – digital editing (tracks 1–4, 6–10)
- Buckley Miller – digital editing (tracks 2, 3, 7, 10)
- Brad Winters – digital editing (tracks 2, 5)
- Cameron Mizell – digital editing (track 5)
- Jim Cooley – mixing
- Zach Kuhlman – mixing assistance
- Andrew Mendelson – mastering
- Alyson McAnally – production coordination
- Alexa Campbell – photography
- Sandi Spika Borchetta – art direction
- Justin Ford – art direction, graphic design
- Kim Perrett – wardrobe, styling
- Mari Brown – grooming

== Charts ==
Chart performance for Tattoos
Chart (2024)	Peak position
US Independent Albums (Billboard)	39
US Top Album Sales (Billboard)	21
US Top Country Albums (Billboard)	42
