= A Modern Day Prodigal Son =

Studio album by Brantley Gilbert
- Released: October 27, 2009
- Recorded: 2005–2009
- Genre: Country rock
- Length: 49:10
- Label: Average Joes
- Producer: Brantley Gilbert; Jeremy Medkiff

Brantley Gilbert chronology
A Modern Day Prodigal Son (2009)	Halfway to Heaven (2010)

Professional ratings
Review scores
Source	Rating
Allmusic	3.5/5 stars

A Modern Day Prodigal Son is the debut studio album from American country rock singer Brantley Gilbert. It was first self-released on a limited scale with just the first eleven songs back in 2005. It finally was released nationally by Average Joes in October 2009 (and later re-released by Valory Music Co.). Although it produced no singles, the song "My Kinda Party" became Jason Aldean's leadoff single to his album of the same name in late 2010. Aldean also covered "The Best of Me" on his third studio album, Wide Open. The album itself charted on Top Country Albums and the Billboard 200.

== Track listing ==
All tracks are written by Brantley Gilbert

No.	Title	Length
1.	"Freshman Year"	4:10
2.	"What's Left of a Small Town"	3:17
3.	"G.R.I.T.S."	3:27
4.	"Whenever We're Alone"	4:18
5.	"The Best of Me"	4:03
6.	"My Kinda Party"	3:59
7.	"A Modern Day Prodigal Son"	4:20
8.	"Live It Up"	3:19
9.	"Friday Night"	3:42
10.	"Indiana's Angel"	3:38
11.	"Rock This Town"	3:13
12.	"Picture on the Dashboard"	4:16
13.	"Play Me That Song"	3:28

== Chart performance ==
Chart (2011–12)	Peak position
US Billboard 200	38
US Billboard Top Country Albums	58
US Billboard Top Heatseekers	41
