= Fire & Brimstone (album) =

Studio album by Brantley Gilbert
- Released: October 4, 2019
- Genre: Country rock
- Length: 51:25
- Label: Valory
- Producer: Brock Berryhill (track 17) Brandon Day (tracks 1,11) Mike Elizondo (tracks 2,3,5,6,12) Dann Huff (tracks 2,4,7–10,13–16)

Brantley Gilbert chronology
The Devil Don't Sleep (2017)	Fire & Brimstone (2019)	So Help Me God (2022)

Singles from Fire & Brimstone
- 1. "What Happens in a Small Town" Released: January 14, 2019; 2. "Fire't Up" Released: December 2, 2019; 3. "Hard Days" Released: June 15, 2020

Fire & Brimstone is the fifth studio album by American country rock artist Brantley Gilbert. It was released on October 4, 2019, via Big Machine Records' Valory imprint. The album includes the singles "What Happens in a Small Town", a duet with Canadian country singer Lindsay Ell and "Fire't Up". Fire & Brimstone debuted at number nine on the US Billboard 200 with 36,000 album-equivalent units, of which 28,000 were pure album sales. A deluxe edition of the album featuring the single "Hard Days" was released on October 2, 2020.

== Content ==
The album is Gilbert's fifth overall, and his third for the Valory imprint of Big Machine Records, to which he has been signed since 2011. It includes a total of fifteen tracks, some of which Gilbert released online prior to the album's release. The song "Not Like Us" was used in advertising for NASCAR in mid-2019. Vocal collaborators on the album include Willie Nelson and his son Lukas (of Lukas Nelson & Promise of the Real), Colt Ford, Jamey Johnson, and Alison Krauss. Canadian country singer Lindsay Ell is featured on the lead single, "What Happens in a Small Town".

== Critical reception ==
Stephen Thomas Erlewine of AllMusic rated it 3.5 out of 5 stars, stating that "Maybe it doesn't have enough intensity to live up to its titular promise, but Fire & Brimstone nevertheless is a cohesive record that shows Gilbert in firm grasp of his craft." Dan MacIntosh of Country Standard Time gave a largely positive review, noting a "spiritual" theme on some songs including the title track, while also praising "Man That Hung the Moon". His review called the album "quality if not exactly country", leaning more toward rock.

== Commercial performance ==
Fire & Brimstone debuted at No. 1 on Billboard's Top Country Albums based on 36,000 album equivalent units, of which 28,000 are in traditional album sales. It also debuted at No. 9 on Billboard 200. It sold a further 5,700 copies the second week. It has sold 70,300 copies as of March 2020, and 127,000 consumed units as of February 2020.

== Track listing ==
No.	Title	Writer(s)	Length
1.	"Fire't Up"	Brantley Gilbert; Brandon Day; Justin Weaver	2:57
2.	"Not Like Us"	Gilbert; Rhett Akins; Brock Berryhill; Amy Wadge	3:03
3.	"Welcome to Hazeville" (featuring Colt Ford, Lukas Nelson & Willie Nelson)	Gilbert; Rodney Clawson; Andrew DeRoberts; Colt Ford	3:01
4.	"What Happens in a Small Town" (with Lindsay Ell)	Gilbert; Akins; Berryhill; Josh Dunne	3:23
5.	"She Ain't Home"	Gilbert; Brian Davis; Weaver	3:21
6.	"Lost Soul's Prayer"	Gilbert; DeRoberts	3:28
7.	"Tough Town"	Gilbert; Blake Chaffin; DeRoberts; Josh Phillips	3:26
8.	"Fire & Brimstone" (featuring Jamey Johnson and Alison Krauss)	Gilbert	5:22
9.	"Laid Back Ride"	Gilbert	3:18
10.	"Bad Boy"	Gilbert; DeRoberts; Phillips	4:01
11.	"New Money"	Gilbert; Akins; Berryhill; Day	3:11
12.	"Breaks Down"	Gilbert; Jaida Dreyer; Josh Mirenda; Weaver	3:09
13.	"Man of Steel"	Gilbert; Berryhill; Cole Taylor	3:05
14.	"Never Gonna Be Alone"	Gilbert; Berryhill; Erik Dylan	3:08
15.	"Man That Hung the Moon"	Gilbert	3:32

Deluxe Edition (Digital/Streaming only)
No.	Title	Writer(s)	Length
16.	"Hard Days"	Gilbert; Berryhilll; Jimi Bell; Jay Brunswick; Logan Wall	2:58
17.	"Old Friends"	Gilbert; Berryhill; Randy Montana	3:38

== Personnel ==
Adapted from AllMusic and liner notes.

- Jeff Babko - Hammond B-3 organ (tracks 3, 6, 12), piano (track 12)
- Brock Berryhill - accordion (track 17), acoustic guitar (track 17), bass guitar (track 17), electric guitar (track 17), Hammond B-3 organ (track 17), harmonica (track 17), percussion (track 17), piano (track 17), programming (tracks 16, 17), synthesizer (track 17), background vocals (track 17)
- Brandon Day - background vocals (tracks 1, 11)
- Tiffany Day - background vocals (track 1)
- Andrew DeRoberts - acoustic guitar (tracks 5, 6, 12), dobro (track 6), electric guitar (tracks 3, 5, 6, 12), keyboards (tracks 5, 6, 12), mandolin (track 5), programming (tracks 6, 12), background vocals (tracks 3, 5)
- David Dorn - keyboards (tracks 1, 11)
- Mike Elizondo - acoustic guitar (track 12), bass guitar (tracks 5, 6, 12), drums (track 17), electric guitar (track 12), keyboards (tracks 3, 5, 6), programming (tracks 2, 3, 5, 6, 12), background vocals (track 3)
- Lindsay Ell - electric guitar (track 4), duet vocals (track 4)
- Colt Ford - featured vocals (track 3)
- Jess Franklin - acoustic guitar (track 5), electric guitar (tracks 1–10, 13–15), keyboards (track 7), background vocals (tracks 3, 5)
- Barrett Hardy-Clay Gilbert - background vocals (track 15)
- Brantley Gilbert - acoustic guitar (track 5), electric guitar (track 6), lead vocals (all tracks), background vocals (tracks 2, 13)
- BJ Golden - acoustic guitar (tracks 3, 5), mandolin (tracks 5, 6, 12), background vocals (track 3)
- Dann Huff - acoustic guitar (tracks 15, 16), banjo (track 7), bass guitar (tracks 2, 16), bouzouki (track 9), electric guitar (tracks 2, 4, 7–10, 13, 14, 16), keyboards (track 14), mandolin (tracks 7, 9, 14, 16), programming (track 10)
- David Huff - programming (tracks 2, 7, 9, 10, 13–15)
- Jamey Johnson - background vocals (track 8)
- Charlie Judge - Hammond B-3 organ (track 16), keyboards (tracks 2, 4, 7–10, 13–15), piano (track 16), programming (tracks 7, 13, 14), synthesizer (track 16)
- Alison Krauss - background vocals (track 8)
- Tony Lucido - bass guitar (track 4)
- Chris McHugh - drums (tracks 2, 4, 7–10, 13–16)
- Miles McPherson - drums (tracks 1, 11)
- Lukas Nelson - featured vocals (track 3)
- Willie Nelson - featured vocals (track 3)
- Justin Niebank - programming (track 9)
- Cherie Oakley - background vocals (track 4)
- Danny Rader - acoustic guitar (tracks 4, 8, 15), electric guitar (track 14), mandolin (track 14)
- Jimmie Lee Sloas - bass guitar (tracks 1, 7–11, 13–15)
- Aaron Sterling - drums (tracks 3, 5, 6, 12)
- Russell Terrell - background vocals (tracks 4, 7, 9, 10, 13, 14, 16)
- Ilya Toshinsky - acoustic guitar (tracks 1, 2, 9, 11, 13, 16), banjo (tracks 1, 11), electric guitar (tracks 1, 7, 10, 13, 16)
- Derek Wells - electric guitar (tracks 1, 11)

== Charts ==
=== Weekly charts ===
Chart (2019)	Peak position
Australian Albums (ARIA)	85
Canadian Albums (Billboard)	26
US Billboard 200	9
US Top Country Albums (Billboard)	1

=== Year-end charts ===
Chart (2019)	Position
US Top Country Albums (Billboard)	60
Chart (2020)	Position
US Top Country Albums (Billboard)	67
