= Hard Days =

2020 song by Brantley Gilbert

Single by Brantley Gilbert

from the album Fire & Brimstone
- Released: June 15, 2020
- Genre: Country
- Length: 2:58
- Label: Valory
- Songwriters: Brantley Gilbert; Jimi Bell; Brock Berryhill; Jay Brunswick; Logan Wall
- Producer: Dann Huff

Brantley Gilbert singles chronology
"Fire't Up" (2019)	"Hard Days" (2020)	"The Worst Country Song of All Time" (2021)

Lyric video
- "Hard Days" on YouTube

"Hard Days" is a song recorded by American country rock artist Brantley Gilbert. He co-wrote the song with Jimi Bell, Brock Berryhill, Jay Brunswick, and Logan Wall. It was a single off the deluxe edition of Gilbert's fifth studio album Fire & Brimstone. He released an acoustic version to celebrate the release of the deluxe album.

== Background and development ==
Gilbert released "Hard Days" amidst the COVID-19 pandemic, and remarked that he hoped the song "offers healing and encouragement in all of the hard times and the hard days in your life," adding it is "about finding hope, or just acknowledging hope and being able to appreciate the bad that leads to the good in your life".

The song was originally written in 2018 by the other four songwriters and sent to Gilbert. He does not usually cut outside songs, so he initially did not record it. After the onset of the pandemic, Gilbert went back to the song and made some alterations to it in order to make it feel authentic from him. He stated that what the four songwriters had originally wrote was "absolutely amazing", and that he "made the story mine and changed some things to where it was in my language". As a recovering addict, Gilbert loved "Hard Days" as it did not attempt to tell people how to deal with hard times, saying one of his least favourite things while dealing with tough situations was hearing people say "I know what you're going through", because everyone's life experiences "are so drastically different". He found the song to be more conversational, and about taking "the good with the bad".

== Critical reception ==
"Hard Days" was released to largely positive reviews. Angela Stefano of Taste of Country described the song as "more muted than Gilbert's usual rock-tinged fare," saying it "offers hope" both "sonically and lyrically". JR Country stated that the track "delivers on its message of sticking out the difficult times for the lessons they impart, the life experiences they bring and the perspective gained from them". Andrew Wendowski of Country Now called the song "uplifting," calling it as a "reminder that difficult times do pass and we often come out strengthened by what we’ve endured". Chris Parton of Sounds Like Nashville referred to the track as an "acoustic ballad with resilient core", saying it puts Gilbert's "gruff vocal in a tender setting," yet "deep down it's all about toughness".

== Credits and personnel ==
Credits adapted from AllMusic.

- Adam Ayan – master engineering
- Jimi Bell – songwriting
- Jay Brunswick — songwriting
- Brock Berryhill – programming, songwriting
- Brantley Gilbert – lead vocals, songwriting
- Mike "Frog" Griffith – production coordination
- Dann Huff — acoustic guitar, bass guitar, electric guitar, mandolin, production
- Charlie Judge — Hammond B3 organ, piano, synthesizer
- Chris McHugh – drums, recording
- Justin Niebank – mixing
- Doug Rich — production coordination
- Janice Soled — production coordination
- Russell Terrell — recording, background vocals
- Ilya Toshinsky — acoustic guitar, electric guitar
- Logan Wall — songwriting

== Charts ==
Chart (2020–2021)	Peak position
US Billboard Hot 100	95
US Country Airplay (Billboard)	27
US Hot Country Songs (Billboard)	27

== Release history ==
Region	Date	Format	Label	Ref.
Various	5 June 2020	Digital download; streaming	Valory Music Co.	
United States	15 June 2020	Country radio	Valory Music Co.	
