= Brantley Gilbert =

American country rock singer (born 1985)

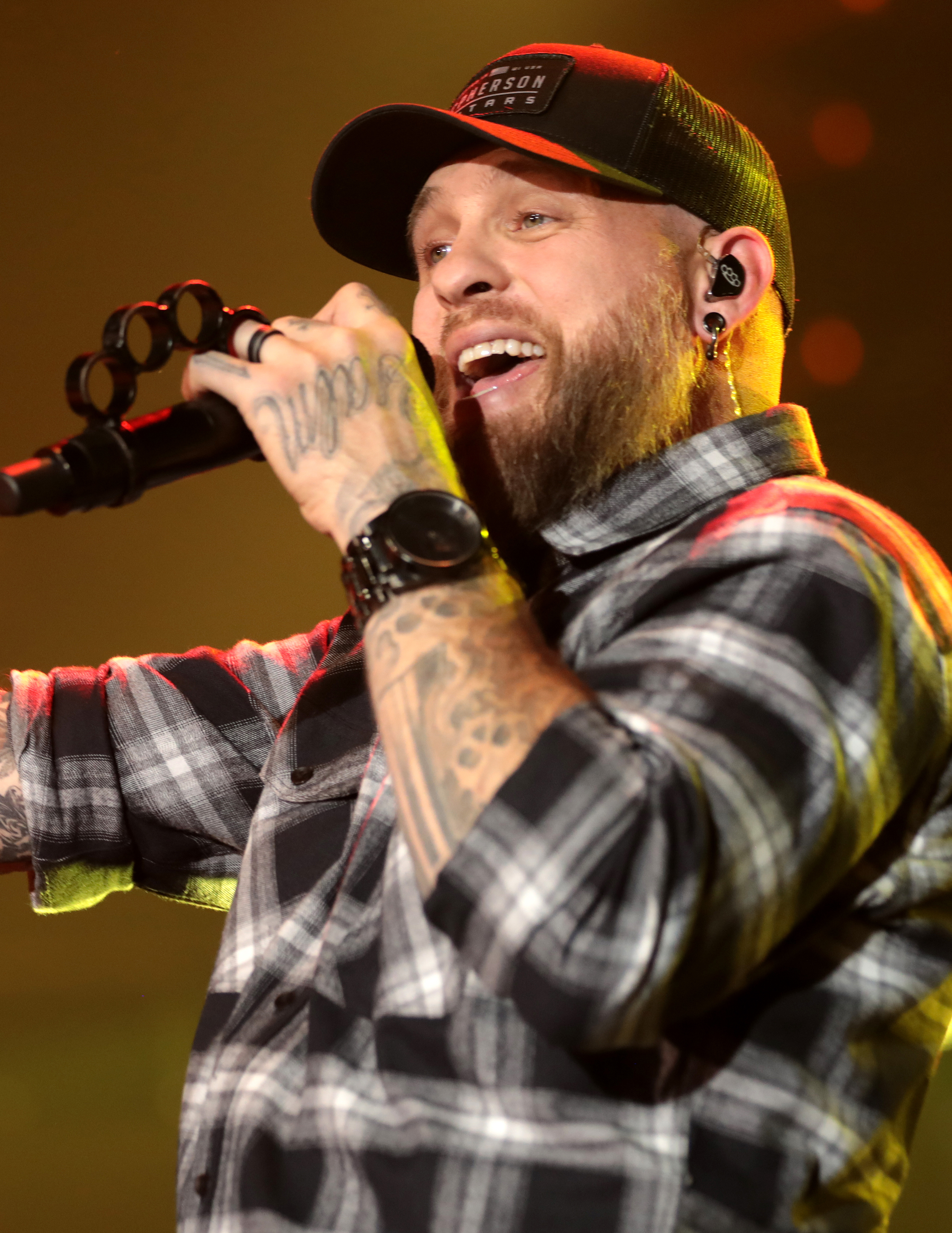
- Gilbert performing in 2021

Background information
- Born: Brantley Keith Gilbert; January 20, 1985 (age 41)
- Origin: Jefferson, Georgia, U.S.
- Genres: Country; country rock; Southern rock; hard rock
- Occupations: Singer; songwriter; record producer
- Instruments: Vocals; guitar
- Years active: 2005–present
- Labels: Average Joes; Valory; BBR Music Group
- Website: brantleygilbert.com

Brantley Keith Gilbert (born January 20, 1985) is an American country rock singer, songwriter and record producer from Jefferson, Georgia. He was originally signed to Colt Ford's label, Average Joes Entertainment, where he released Modern Day Prodigal Son and Halfway to Heaven. He is now signed to the Valory division of Big Machine Records where he has released six studio albums—a deluxe edition of Halfway to Heaven, Just as I Am, The Devil Don't Sleep, Fire & Brimstone, So Help Me God, Tattoos, and 14 country chart entries, four of which have gone to number one. He also co-wrote (with Colt Ford) and originally recorded Jason Aldean's singles "My Kinda Party" and "Dirt Road Anthem".

== Career ==
=== 2007–2013: A Modern Day Prodigal Son and Halfway to Heaven ===
Brantley Gilbert went to Nashville as a songwriter, where he signed to Warner Chappell Publishing. He continued performing at local venues. In 2009, he released his debut album, A Modern Day Prodigal Son, under independent label Average Joes Entertainment. He followed with Halfway to Heaven in 2010.

In 2011, he signed with Valory Music Co., a division of Big Machine Records, who released a deluxe edition of Halfway to Heaven. The album was produced by Dann Huff. Its first two singles, "Country Must Be Country Wide" and "You Don't Know Her Like I Do", both went to number one on the Hot Country Songs chart. After them, "Kick It in the Sticks" peaked at number 34, and "More Than Miles" at number 7 on Country Airplay. He won the ACM New Male Artist award in 2013.

=== 2014–2017: Just as I Am and The Devil Don't Sleep ===
Gilbert's second Valory album (third overall), Just as I Am, was released in May 2014. Its lead single, "Bottoms Up", also reached number one. The second single, "Small Town Throwdown", featured guest vocals from labelmates Thomas Rhett and Justin Moore. The third single, "One Hell of an Amen", became Brantley's fourth number-one hit in 2015. The album's fourth single was "Stone Cold Sober", released with the album's platinum edition.

Ahead of his fourth album, The Devil Don't Sleep, Gilbert released the single "The Weekend" as the album's lead single. Also included on the album is "The Ones That Like Me".

A deluxe edition of The Devil Don't Sleep includes ten bonus tracks: five demos, and five tracks cut from a live performance at the Red Rocks Amphitheatre.

=== 2018–2023: Fire & Brimstone and So Help Me God ===
In December 2018, Gilbert released a duet with Lindsay Ell, "What Happens in a Small Town", as the lead single from his fifth studio album, Fire & Brimstone. The album was released in October 2019. "Fire't Up" was released as the second single off the album.

In June 2020, Gilbert released the single "Hard Days". The song was later included on a deluxe edition of Fire & Brimstone.

In June 2021, Gilbert released the single "The Worst Country Song of All Time", featuring Hardy and Toby Keith, and followed it up with the promotional single "Gone But Not Forgotten" in September 2021. The second promotional single, "How to Talk to Girls", was released on November 19, 2021. In March 2022, Gilbert and Jason Aldean released the third promotional single, "Rolex on a Redneck". In June 2022, Gilbert and Jelly Roll released the fourth promotional single, "Son of the Dirty South", which charted on multiple Billboard charts.

Gilbert released his sixth studio album So Help Me God on November 10, 2022 and released "Heaven by Then", featuring Blake Shelton and Vince Gill, as the album's second single. He opened for Five Finger Death Punch on their late 2022 headlining tour along with Cory Marks in the United States. He released a deluxe edition of So Help Me God on April 21, 2023, containing five new tracks, including the promotional single "Bury Me Upside Down". Gilbert joined Nickelback's "Get Rollin' Tour" in summer 2023 in North America as an opening act alongside fellow country artist Josh Ross.

=== 2024–present: Tattoos, Greatest Hits... So Far and label change ===
On March 8, 2024, Gilbert released "Off The Rails", as the lead promotional single from his seventh studio album. The album's first official single "Over When We're Sober", featuring Ashley Cooke, was released on June 20, 2024.

In July 2024, Gilbert announced his seventh studio album Tattoos, which was released on September 13, 2024. He released the songs "Me and My House", featuring Struggle Jennings and Demun Jones, and "Dirty Money", featuring Justin Moore, as the album's third and fourth promotional singles, respectively. In January 2025, Gilbert was featured on a remix of country rock artist Austin Snell's song "Muddy Water Rockstar", as promotion for Snell opening for Gilbert on tour in 2025.

On May 23, 2025, Gilbert released a 10th anniversary edition of his third studio album, Just as I Am. The album contained two new live tracks that weren't included on the original release. On June 6, 2025, Gilbert released a 15th anniversary edition of his second studio album, Halfway to Heaven, containing the original recordings of the album's tracks, entitled Halfway to Heaven (From the Vault).

In September 2025, Gilbert announced his next single, "Want You Back" as a surprise release on September 5, 2025. Upon release, Gilbert announced his next album, a greatest hits compilation, Greatest Hits... So Far, to release on December 12, 2025, featuring three previously unreleased songs, "Want You Back", "Real American", and "Ride With Me". Real American Freestyle co-founder Hulk Hogan had commissioned Gilbert to write “Real American” as the promotion’s theme song.

On October 2, 2025, it was announced by surprise guest, Jelly Roll, during Gilbert's concert at First Bank Amphitheater in Franklin, Tennessee, that BBR Music Group and BMG had signed. Representatives from the management group and label were present to honor Gilbert.

On February 8, 2026, Gilbert performed at Turning Point USA's All-American Halftime Show alongside Kid Rock, Lee Brice, and Gabby Barrett, performing "Real American" and "Dirt Road Anthem".

== Songwriting ==
In addition to his original work, Gilbert has written songs that Colt Ford and Jason Aldean have recorded. The songs "Dirt Road Anthem" (co-written and originally recorded by him and Colt Ford) and "My Kinda Party" were released on Aldean's 2010 album My Kinda Party. "My Kinda Party" was originally recorded by Gilbert on Modern Day Prodigal Son, while "Dirt Road Anthem" was on Halfway to Heaven. Aldean has also covered Gilbert's "The Best of Me", available on the iTunes release of his 2009 album Wide Open. Gilbert has also co-written the tracks "The Same Way" on Aldean's album 9 and "Small Town Small" on his album Macon, Georgia.

== Personal life ==
In 2013, Gilbert embarked on an eight-day USO tour to entertain American service members stationed in Italy and Kuwait.

Brantley Gilbert was in a near-fatal truck accident when he was 19. Gilbert is an active Christian, and his song "My Faith In You", from his album Just as I Am, speaks of his faith.

Gilbert headlined the NRA's Country Concert in February 2023.

In April 2023, Gilbert smashed a can of Bud Light on stage after saying, "Yeah, fuck that." Bud Light had recently become the focus of a boycott from conservatives because of a sponsored Instagram post by transgender woman, Dylan Mulvaney.

Gilbert joined Real American Beer in February 2026 as a partner and investor.

=== Relationships ===
It was announced in September 2012 that Brantley Gilbert was dating country music singer and actress Jana Kramer. They were engaged on January 20, 2013, his 28th birthday, but split in August 2013.

In October 2014, Gilbert got engaged to Amber Cochran, a teacher, after they reconnected after dating in high school. The couple were married in June 2015, and have three children.

== Tours ==
- 2011
  - Willie Nelson's Country Throwdown Tour
  - Taste of Country Christmas Tour (headline) with Thomas Rhett
- 2012
  - Eric Church's Blood, Sweat and Beers Tour
  - Toby Keith's Live in Overdrive Tour
  - Hell on Wheels Tour (headline) Brian Davis, Greg Bates, and Uncle Kracker
- 2013
  - Tim McGraw's Two Lanes of Freedom Tour
- 2014
  - Let It Ride (first leg with Thomas Rhett, Eric Paslay, and Brian Davis); (second leg with Brian Davis, Chase Bryant, Aaron Lewis, and Tyler Farr; Lewis and Farr split dates)
- 2015
  - Kenny Chesney's The Big Revival Tour
- 2016
  - The Blackout Tour January – April (headline) with Brian Davis, Michael Ray, and Canaan Smith
  - Take It Outside Tour June – October (headline) with Colt Ford, and Justin Moore
- 2017
  - The Devil Don't Sleep Tour February – April (headline) with Tucker Beathard and Luke Combs
- 2018
  - The Ones That Like Me Tour (headline)
  - Kid Rock's Red Blooded Rock N Roll Redneck Extravaganza Tour (co-headline)
- 2019
  - Not Like Us Tour (headline)
- 2022
  - Son of the Dirty South Tour (with Jelly Roll and special guest Pillbox Patti)
  - Five Finger Death Punch US Arena Tour
- 2023
  - Nickelback's Get Rollin' Tour
- 2024
  - Off the Rails Tour
- 2025
  - The Tattoos Tour 2025 (headline)
- 2026
  - All-American Halftime Show (Turning Point USA)

== Discography ==
=== Albums ===
- A Modern Day Prodigal Son (2009)
- Halfway to Heaven (2010)
- Just as I Am (2014)
- The Devil Don't Sleep (2017)
- Fire & Brimstone (2019)
- So Help Me God (2022)
- Tattoos (2024)
- Sins of the Father (2026)

=== Compilations ===
- Greatest Hits... So Far (2025)

== Awards and nominations ==
| Year | Association | Category | Recipient | Result | Ref. |
|---|---|---|---|---|---|
| 2011 | Country Music Association Awards | Song of the Year | "Dirt Road Anthem" | Nominated | |
| 2011 | Academy of Country Music Awards | New Artist of the Year | Brantley Gilbert | Nominated | |
| 2012 | Academy of Country Music Awards | New Artist of the Year | Brantley Gilbert | Nominated | |
| 2012 | Academy of Country Music Awards | New Male Vocalist of the Year | Brantley Gilbert | Won | |
| 2012 | American Country Awards | Breakthrough Artist Single of the Year | "You Don't Know Her Like I Do" | Won | |
| 2012 | Country Music Association Awards | New Artist of the Year | Brantley Gilbert | Nominated | |
| 2013 | CRS | New Faces | Brantley Gilbert | Won | |
| 2013 | Country Music Association Awards | CMA Triple Play Award | "Country Must Be Country Wide", "You Don't Know Her Like I Do", "Dirt Road Anthem" | Won | |
| 2013 | Academy of Country Music Awards | Top New Male Artist | Brantley Gilbert | Won | |
| 2013 | Academy of Country Music Awards | New Artist of the Year | Brantley Gilbert | Nominated | |
| 2014 | American Music Awards | Favorite Country Album | Just As I Am | Won | |
| 2014 | American Country Countdown Awards | Album of the Year | "Small Town Throwdown" | Nominated | |
| 2014 | American Country Countdown Awards | Collaboration of the Year | "Small Town Throwdown" (featuring Justin Moore and Thomas Rhett) | Nominated | |
| 2015 | iHeartRadio Music Awards | Renegade Award | Brantley Gilbert | Won | |
| 2015 | Billboard Music Awards | Top Country Artist | Brantley Gilbert | Nominated | |
| 2015 | Billboard Music Awards | Top Country Album | Just as I Am | Nominated | |
| 2016 | CMT Music Awards | Performance Video of the Year | "What's Your Name" (with Lynyrd Skynyrd) – CMT Crossroads" | Nominated | |
| 2017 | BMI Country Awards | Top 50 Songs | "The Weekend" | Won | |
| 2019 | CMT Music Awards | Collaborative Video of the Year | "What Happens In A Small Town" (with Lindsay Ell) | Nominated | |
