= Kick It in the Sticks =

2010 single by Brantley Gilbert

Single by Brantley Gilbert

from the album Halfway to Heaven
- Released: February 22, 2010; July 30, 2012 (re-release)
- Genre: Country; grunge
- Length: 3:45
- Label: Valory
- Songwriters: Brantley Gilbert; Rhett Akins; Ben Hayslip
- Producers: The Atom Brothers (2010); Dann Huff (2012)

Brantley Gilbert singles chronology
"You Don't Know Her Like I Do" (2011)	"Kick It in the Sticks" (2012)	"More Than Miles" (2012)

Brantley Gilbert (2010) singles chronology
"Kick It in the Sticks" (2010)	"My Kind of Crazy" (2010)

"Kick It in the Sticks" is a song co-written and recorded by American country music singer Brantley Gilbert. It was originally released in 2010 and re-released in 2012 as a single from his album Halfway to Heaven via the Valory Music Group. The song was by Gilbert, along with Rhett Akins and Ben Hayslip.

== Critical reception ==
Billy Dukes of Taste of Country gave the song five stars out of five, writing that "while the aggressive guitars and spoken-word delivery can be intimidating, Gilbert's message couldn't be more welcoming."

T. Ballard Lesemann, writing for the Charleston City Paper, described the 2010 version as "an authentic redneck anthem that touches all the clichés", and compared it to grunge and nu-metal.

== Music video ==
The music video, which was made for the 2010 version, directed by Potsy Ponciroli, premiered on October 4, 2011. It depicts a rowdy party in the woods. T. Ballard Lesemann, writing for the Charleston City Paper, described as looking like "something Kid Rock might have directed."

== Charts and certifications (2012 version) ==
The 2010 release of "Kick It in the Sticks" had failed to chart, but the 2012 rendition went to number 29 on the U.S. Billboard Hot Country Songs chart and number 38 on the Country Airplay chart.

=== Chart performance ===
Chart (2012)	Peak position
US Bubbling Under Hot 100 Singles (Billboard)	13
US Country Airplay (Billboard)	34
US Hot Country Songs (Billboard)	29

=== Certifications ===
Region	Certification	Certified units/sales
United States (RIAA)	2× Platinum	2,000,000^{‡}
^{‡} Sales+streaming figures based on certification alone.
