= Josh Turner discography =

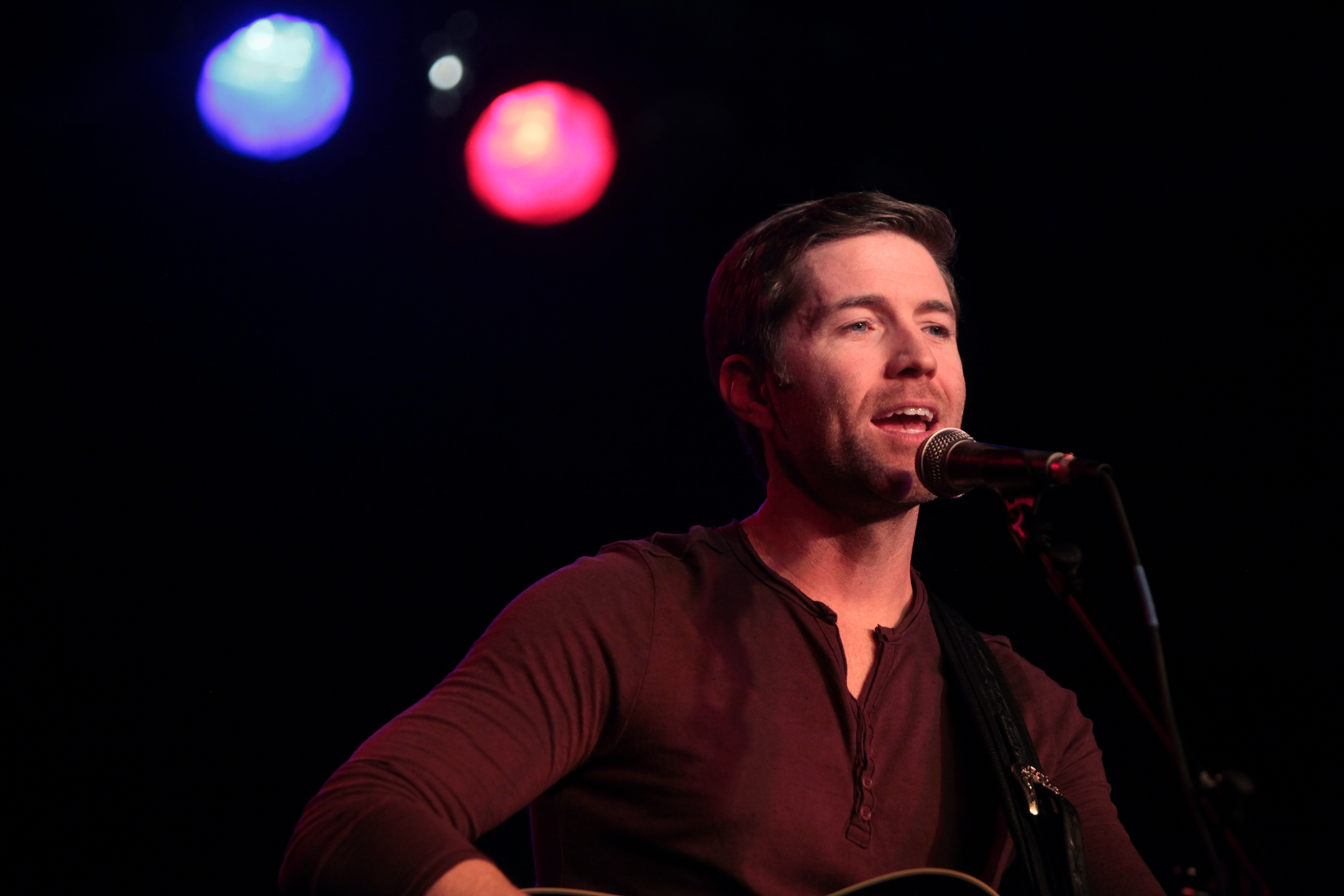
- Studio albums: 9
- Live albums: 2
- Compilation albums: 1
- Singles: 17
- Music videos: 16
- #1 Singles: 4

Josh Turner is an American country music artist. His discography comprises nine studio albums and seventeen singles, all released on MCA Nashville. Turner's first three albums are all certified by the Recording Industry Association of America. His 2003 debut Long Black Train is certified platinum, 2006's Your Man is certified 3× Platinum, and 2007's Everything Is Fine is certified gold. Of his singles, the highest-charting are "Your Man", "Would You Go with Me", "Why Don't We Just Dance", and "All Over Me"—all of which reached number one on the US country singles charts. "Why Don't We Just Dance" is also his highest peak on the Billboard Hot 100, at 35. "Time Is Love" and "Long Black Train" are certified platinum as singles, while "Your Man", "Would You Go with Me", "Why Don't We Just Dance" are certified triple platinum.

== Studio albums ==
=== 2000s ===
Title	Album details	Peak chart positions			Certifications (sales thresholds)
Title	Album details	US Country	US	US Heat	Certifications (sales thresholds)
Long Black Train (Note: Long Black Train was re-issued in 2004 with four tracks removed.)	Release date: October 14, 2003; Label: MCA Nashville; Formats: CD, music download	3	29	1	US: Platinum
Your Man	Release date: January 24, 2006; Label: MCA Nashville; Formats: CD, music download	1	2	—	US: 3× Platinum; RMNZ: Gold
Everything Is Fine	Release date: October 30, 2007; Label: MCA Nashville; Formats: CD, music download	3	5	—	US: Gold
"—" denotes releases that did not chart

=== 2010s and 2020s ===
Title	Album details	Peak chart positions			Certification / Sales
Title	Album details	US Country	US	US Christ	Certification / Sales
Haywire	Release date: February 9, 2010; Label: MCA Nashville; Formats: CD, music download	2	5	—	US: Platinum; US: 330,000
Punching Bag	Release date: June 12, 2012; Label: MCA Nashville; Formats: CD, music download	1	4	—	US: 209,000
Deep South	Release date: March 10, 2017; Label: MCA Nashville; Formats: CD, music download	1	18	—	US: 61,700
I Serve a Savior	Release date: October 26, 2018; Label: MCA Nashville; Formats: CD, music download	2	41	2	US: 147,000
Country State of Mind	Release date: August 21, 2020; Label: MCA Nashville; Formats: CD, LP, music download	14	131	—	
King Size Manger	Release date: October 8, 2021; Label: MCA Nashville; Formats: CD, LP, music download	—	—	—	
This Country Music Thing	Release date: August 16, 2024; Label: MCA Nashville; Formats: CD, LP, music download	—	—	—	
"—" denotes releases that did not chart

== Compilation albums ==
Title	Album details	Peak chart positions		Certification / Sales
Title	Album details	US Country	US	Certification / Sales
Icon	Release date: March 22, 2011; Label: MCA Nashville; Formats: CD, music download	20	93	US: Gold; US: 506,100
Icon 2	Release date: 2014; Label: MCA Nashville; Formats: CD	—	—	
Greatest Hits	Release date: September 8, 2023; Label: MCA Nashville; Formats: CD, vinyl, music download	—	—	

== Live albums ==
Title	Album details	Peak chart positions	
Title	Album details	US Country	US
Live at the Ryman	Release date: July 2, 2007; Label: Cracker Barrel; Formats: CD	—	—
Live Across America	Release date: August 27, 2012; Label: Cracker Barrel; Formats: CD, music download	7	48
"—" denotes releases that did not chart

== Singles ==
=== 2000s ===
Title	Year	Peak chart positions				Certifications	Album
Title	Year	US Country Songs	US	CAN Country	CAN	Certifications	Album
"She'll Go on You"	2002	46	—	—	—		Long Black Train
"Long Black Train"	2003	13	72	—	—	RIAA: 2× Platinum	Long Black Train
"What It Ain't"	2004	31	—	—	—		Long Black Train
"Your Man"	2005	1	38	2	—	RIAA: 5× Platinum; BPI: Gold; RMNZ: 4× Platinum	Your Man
"Would You Go with Me"	2006	1	43	5	—	RIAA: 4× Platinum; RMNZ: Gold	Your Man
"Me and God" (with Ralph Stanley; uncredited)	2006	16	98	38	—	RIAA: Gold	Your Man
"Firecracker"	2007	2	50	8	78	RIAA: Platinum	Everything Is Fine
"Another Try" (featuring Trisha Yearwood)	2008	15	96	45	—		Everything Is Fine
"Everything Is Fine"	2008	20	— (Note: "Everything Is Fine" did not enter the Billboard Hot 100, but peaked at number 20 on Bubbling Under Hot 100 Singles.)	—	—		Everything Is Fine
"Why Don't We Just Dance"	2009	1	35	1	59	RIAA: 3× Platinum; RMNZ: Gold	Haywire
"—" denotes releases that did not chart

=== 2010s and 2020s ===
Title	Year	Peak chart positions					Certifications	Album
Title	Year	US Country Songs	US Country Airplay	US	CAN Country	CAN	Certifications	Album
"All Over Me"	2010	1		59	15	—	RIAA: Gold	Haywire
"I Wouldn't Be a Man"	2010	18		92	—	—	RIAA: Gold	Haywire
"Time Is Love"	2012	2		44	14	92	RIAA: Platinum	Punching Bag
"Find Me a Baby"	2012	—	42	—	—	—		Punching Bag
"Lay Low"	2014	28	25	— (Note: "Lay Low" did not enter the Billboard Hot 100, but peaked at number 20 on Bubbling Under Hot 100 Singles.)	49	—	RIAA: Gold	Deep South
"Hometown Girl"	2016	5	2	56	7	—	RIAA: 2× Platinum	Deep South
"All About You"	2017	—	47	—	—	—		Deep South
"Heatin' Things Up"	2024	—	—	—	—	—		This Country Music Thing
"—" denotes releases that did not chart

== Other contributions ==
- "Tears of God" – America Will Always Stand album
- "In My Dreams" – Today – Tomorrow – Forever: A Collection Of Country Love Songs, Walmart Exclusive
- "First Noel" – 2004 Target Christmas, Target Exclusive
- "Softly and Tenderly" – Amazing Grace 3: A Country Salute To Gospel
- "Long Black Train" – Three Wooden Crosses
- "Good Woman Bad" – An Unfinished Life film
- "Hard Headed" – iTunes exclusive single
- "Almost Persuaded" – Billy: The Early Years
- "When I Paint My Masterpiece" – Endless Highway: The Music of The Band
- "Don't Fence Me In" – Kit Kittredge: An American Girl (Original Motion Picture Soundtrack)
- "T.I.M.E" – Anniversary Collection (Randy Travis album)
- "Gotta Go Back" – Inspired: Songs of Faith & Family (Joey + Rory album)
- "Why I Love Christmas" – Duck The Halls: A Robertson Family Christmas
- "Back From Gone" - "Forever My Girl" Soundtrack

== Music videos ==
Year	Title	Director
2003	"Long Black Train"	Steven Goldmann
2004	"What It Ain't"	Steven Goldmann
2006	"Your Man"	Roger Pistole
2006	"Would You Go with Me"	Kristin Barlowe
2007	"Firecracker"	Peter Zavadil
2008	"Another Try"	Stephen Scott
2008	"Everything Is Fine"	Roman White
2009	"Why Don't We Just Dance"	Deaton Flanigen
2010	"I Wouldn't Be a Man"	Peter Zavadil
2012	"Time Is Love"	Peter Zavadil
2013	"Find Me a Baby"	Peter Zavadil
2013	"Gotta Go Back" (with Joey + Rory)	Rory Feek/Gabe McCauley
2013	"Alligator Stroll"	Sandra Boynton
2014	"Lay Low"	Trey Fanjoy
2017	"Hometown Girl" (Live Acoustic)	Michael Monaco
2017	"Deep South" (Live Acoustic)	David McClister
2017	"All About You"	Shaun Silva
2021	"Soldier’s Gift"	Peter Zavadil
2025	"Unsung Hero"	Rand Smith

|}
