= Bryan Sutton discography =

Bryan Sutton is an American guitarist and singer/songwriter. In addition to his six solo albums and recordings with Ricky Skaggs and Hot Rize, he has been featured as a performer on many albums by other artists.

== Solo albums ==
Title	Label	Release date	Peak positions
Title	Label	Release date	US Bluegrass
Ready to Go	Sugar Hill	February 22, 2000	—
Bluegrass Guitar	Sugar Hill	May 13, 2003	—
Not Too Far from the Tree	Sugar Hill	March 14, 2006	8
Almost Live	Sugar Hill	July 14, 2009	9
Into My Own	Sugar Hill	April 29, 2014	5
The More I Learn	Sugar Hill	June 3, 2016	3
"—" denotes releases that did not chart

== Music videos ==
Year	Video	Director
2014	"That's Where I Belong"	Bill Filipiak

== As a member of Ricky Skaggs and Kentucky Thunder ==
- 1997: Life is a Journey (Atlantic Records)
- 1997: Bluegrass Rules! (Rounder)
- 1999: Ancient Tones (Skaggs Family)
- 1999: Soldier of the Cross (Skaggs Family)

== As a member of Hot Rize ==
- 2014: When I'm Free (Ten In Hand Records)

== Together with Billy Strings ==
- 2025: Billy Strings and Bryan Sutton: Live at the Legion (Reprise Records)

== As producer ==
- 2013: Della Mae - This World Oft Can Be (Rounder)

== As composer ==
- 2006: Casey Driessen - 3D (Sugar Hill) - track 2, "Gaptooth" (co-written with Béla Fleck and Casey Driessen)

== As sideman ==
=== 1999 - 2002 ===
- 1999: Dixie Chicks - Fly (Monument) - acoustic guitar
- 1999: Jesse Winchester - Gentleman of Leisure (Sugar Hill) - guitarist
- 2001: Dolly Parton - Little Sparrow (Blue Eye / Sugar Hill) - guitar
- 2001: Mike Burns - Walk the Water's Edge (North Co Music) - lead guitar, rhythm guitar
- 2002: The Chieftains - Down the Old Plank Road: The Nashville Sessions (RCA Victor) - acoustic guitar, banjo, mandolin, octave mandolin
- 2002: Dixie Chicks - Home (Open Wide / Monument / Columbia) - guitar, baritone guitar
- 2002: Shana Morrison - 7 Wishes (Vanguard) - acoustic guitar mandolin

=== 2003 - 2005 ===
- 2003: The Chieftains - Further Down the Old Plank Road (RCA Victor) - acoustic guitar, banjo, mandolin
- 2003: Martina McBride - Martina (RCA) - guitar, mandolin
- 2003: Natalie MacMaster - Blueprint (Rounder) - guitar
- 2003: Kenny Rogers - Back to the Well (Dreamcatcher) - guitar
- 2003: Josh Turner - Long Black Train (MCA Nashville) - acoustic guitar, resonator guitar, banjo
- 2003: Rhonda Vincent - One Step Ahead (Rounder) - guitar
- 2003: various artists - O Mickey, Where Art Thou? (Walt Disney) - guitar
- 2004: Maura O'Connell - Don't I Know (Sugar Hill) - guitar
- 2004: Mindy Smith - One Moment More (Vanguard) - acoustic guitar
- 2004: Montgomery Gentry - You Do Your Thing (Columbia) - banjo, bouzouki
- 2004: Phil Vassar - Shaken Not Stirred (Arista Nashville) - acoustic guitar, mandolin
- 2005: Trace Adkins - Songs About Me (Capitol Nashville) - acoustic guitar, banjo, mandolin
- 2005: Faith Hill - Fireflies (Warner Bros.) - acoustic guitar, Wiessenborn
- 2005: Brad Paisley - Time Well Wasted (Arista Nashville) - mandolin
- 2005: George Strait - Somewhere Down in Texas (MCA Nashville) - acoustic guitar
- 2005: Carrie Underwood - Some Hearts (Arista Nashville) - acoustic guitar on track 13, "Too Old To Die Young"
- 2005: Trisha Yearwood - Jasper County (MCA Nashville) - acoustic guitar, slide guitar, mandocello

=== 2006 - 2007 ===
- 2006: Trace Adkins - Dangerous Man (Capitol Nashville) - acoustic guitar, banjo, mandolin, electric guitar
- 2006: Dierks Bentley - Long Trip Alone (Capitol)
- 2006: Brooks & Dunn - Hillbilly Deluxe (Arista Nashville) - mandolin, acoustic guitar, banjo
- 2006: Eric Church - Sinners Like Me (Capitol Records Nashville) - acoustic guitar, banjo, mandolin
- 2006: JJ Heller - Only Love Remains (Stone Table) - acoustic guitar, banjo, mandolin
- 2006: Steve Holy - Brand New Girlfriend (Curb) - acoustic guitar
- 2006: Kenny Rogers - Water & Bridges (Capitol Nashville) - acoustic guitar
- 2006: Linda Ronstadt and Ann Savoy - Adieu False Heart (Vanguard) - guitar
- 2006: Josh Turner - Your Man (MCA Nashville) - acoustic guitar, banjo
- 2006: Jim VanCleve - No Apologies (Rural Rhythm) - guitar
- 2007: Brooks & Dunn - Cowboy Town (Arista Nashville) - acoustic guitar, mandolin
- 2007: Joe Nichols - Real Things (Universal South) - acoustic guitar, mandolin, mandocello
- 2007: Josh Turner - Everything Is Fine (MCA Nashville) - banjo, resonator guitar, acoustic guitar
- 2007: Trisha Yearwood - Heaven, Heartache and the Power of Love (Big Machine) - acoustic guitar

=== 2008 - 2009 ===
- 2008: Trace Adkins - X (Ten) (Capitol Nashville) - acoustic guitar, banjo, resonator guitar
- 2008: Brad Paisley - Play (Arista Nashville) - acoustic guitar
- 2008: Deric Ruttan - First Time in a Long Time (On Ramp) - acoustic guitar, mandolin, banjo, bouzouki
- 2008: Charlie Haden Family & Friends - Rambling Boy (Decca) - guitar
- 2008: k.d. lang - Watershed (Nonesuch) - guitar
- 2008: Dolly Parton - Backwoods Barbie (Dolly) - acoustic guitar, electric guitar
- 2008: Jessica Simpson - Do You Know (Epic) - acoustic guitar
- 2008: Joey + Rory - The Life of a Song (Sugar Hill) - acoustic guitar
- 2008: Taylor Swift - Fearless (Big Machine) - mandolin, acoustic guitar, banjo
- 2008: Rhonda Vincent - Good Thing Going (Rounder) - guitar
- 2009: Eric Church - Carolina (Capitol Nashville) - mandolin, acoustic guitar, banjo
- 2009: Harry Connick, Jr. - Your Songs (Columbia) - guitar
- 2009: Rodney Atkins - It's America (Curb) - acoustic guitar, banjo
- 2009: Reba McEntire - Keep On Loving You (Valory) - banjo
- 2009: Adam Steffey - One More for the Road (Sugar Hill) -
- 2009: Rob Thomas - Cradlesong (Emblem)

=== 2010 - 2011 ===
- 2010: Dierks Bentley - Up on the Ridge (Capitol Nashville) - acoustic guitar, resonator guitar
- 2010: Johnny Mathis - Let It Be Me: Mathis in Nashville (Columbia) - mandolin, acoustic guitar, banjo
- 2010: Tim O'Brien - Chicken & Egg (Howdy Skies) - guitar
- 2010: Nora Jane Struthers - Nora Jane Struthers (Blue Pig) - guitar
- 2010: Taylor Swift - Speak Now (Big Machine Records) - acoustic guitar, 12-string guitar, ukulele
- 2010: Josh Turner - Haywire (MCA Nashville) - guitar
- 2010: Jimmy Webb - Just Across the River (E1 Music) - banjo, mandolin, acoustic guitar
- 2011: Eric Church - Chief (EMI Nashville) - mandolin, acoustic guitar, banjo
- 2011: Sara Evans - Stronger (Sony Music) - acoustic guitar, banjo
- 2011: JD Souther - Natural History (eOne) - electric guitar, acoustic guitar
- 2011: Sierra Hull - Daybreak (Rounder) - guitar
- 2011: Rodney Atkins - Take a Back Road (Curb) - mandolin, acoustic guitar, banjo
- 2011: Matt Wertz - Weights & Wings (Handwritten) - acoustic guitar

=== 2012 - 2013 ===
- 2012: Dierks Bentley - Home (Capitol Nashville) - mandolin, acoustic guitar, banjo
- 2012: Diana Krall - Glad Rag Doll (Verve) - guitar
- 2012: Jana Kramer - Jana Kramer (Elektra Nashville) - acoustic guitar
- 2012: Kathy Mattea - Calling Me Home (Sugar Hill) - mandolin, banjo, acoustic guitar, electric guitar, octave banjo, octave mandolin
- 2012: Tim McGraw - Emotional Traffic (Curb) - acoustic guitar
- 2012: Lionel Richie - Tuskegee (Mercury) - acoustic guitar, mandolin
- 2012: Kenny Rogers - The Love Of God (Cracker Barrel) - acoustic guitar, mandolin, banjo
- 2012: Josh Turner - Punching Bag (MCA Nashville) - acoustic guitar, banjo
- 2013: Harry Connick, Jr. - Every Man Should Know (Columbia) - guitar
- 2013: The Isaacs - The Living Years (Gaither Music Group) - guitar, resonator guitar
- 2013: Tim McGraw - Two Lanes of Freedom (Big Machine) - guitar
- 2013: Noam Pikelny - Noam Pikelny Plays Kenny Baker Plays Bill Monroe (Compass) - guitar
- 2013: Kellie Pickler - The Woman I Am (Black River) - guitar
- 2013: Kenny Rogers - You Can't Make Old Friends (Warner Bros.) - acoustic guitar, mandolin
- 2013: Peter Rowan - The Old School (Compass) - guitar on track 5, "Doc Watson Morning"

=== 2014 - present ===
- 2014: Dan + Shay - Where It All Began (Warner Bros.) - acoustic guitar, mandolin, banjo
- 2014: Garth Brooks - Man Against Machine (RCA) - acoustic guitar, mandolin
- 2014: Johnny Cash - Out Among the Stars (Columbia / Legacy) - acoustic guitar, banjo on track 11, "Don't You Think It's Come Our Time"
- 2014: Eric Church- The Outsiders (EMI Records Nashville) - acoustic guitar, 12-string guitar, resonator guitar, mandolin, octave mandolin, banjo, piano, bouzouki, percussion
- 2014: The Doobie Brothers - Southbound (Arista Nashville) - acoustic guitar, mandolin
- 2014: Florida Georgia Line - Anything Goes (Big Loud Mountain) - bouzouki, acoustic guitar, resonator guitar, banjo, mandolin
- 2014: Tim McGraw - Sundown Heaven Town (Big Machine) - banjo, acoustic guitar
- 2015: Clint Black - On Purpose (Thirty Tigers / Blacktop) - mandolin on track 1, "Time For That"
- 2015: Don Henley - Cass County (Capitol) - acoustic guitar, mandolin
- 2015: Josh Groban - Stages (Reprise) - guitar on track 2, "What I Did For Love"
- 2015: Carrie Underwood - Storyteller (Arista Nashville) - acoustic guitar
- 2016: Dierks Bentley - Black (Capitol Nashville) - guitar
- 2016: Chris Lane - Girl Problems (Big Loud) - acoustic guitar, resonator guitar
- 2016: Cyndi Lauper - Detour (Sire) - acoustic guitar
- 2016: Loretta Lynn - Full Circle (Legacy) - acoustic guitar
- 2016: Mo Pitney - Behind This Guitar (Curb) - acoustic guitar
- 2016: Blake Shelton - If I'm Honest (Warner Bros.) - acoustic guitar
- 2017: Dailey & Vincent - Patriots and Poets (BFD / Red River) - acoustic guitar, resonator guitar
- 2017: Tim O'Brien - Where the River Meets the Road (Howdy Skies) - guitar
- 2017: Josh Turner - Deep South (MCA Nashville) - acoustic guitar
- 2017: various artists - The Shack: Music from and Inspired by the Original Motion Picture (Atlantic) - banjo, bouzouki, acoustic guitar, mandolin
- 2021: Niko Moon - Good Time (RCA) - acoustic guitar
