= Icon (Josh Turner album) =

Compilation album by Josh Turner
- Released: March 22, 2011
- Genre: Country
- Length: 40:28
- Label: MCA Nashville
- Producer: Frank Rogers, Mark Wright

Josh Turner chronology
Haywire (2010)	Icon (2011)	Punching Bag (2012)

Icon is a compilation album by American country music artist Josh Turner. It was released on March 22, 2011. It is part of a series of similar Icon albums released by Universal Music Enterprises. The album includes Turner's four number-one singles ("Your Man," "Would You Go with Me," "Why Don't We Just Dance" and "All Over Me") as well as album tracks "As Fast as I Could" and "Backwoods Boy". This album was also released under the name Best of Josh Turner.

== Critical reception ==
Professional ratings
Review scores
Source	Rating
Allmusic	3.5/5 stars

Thom Jurek of Allmusic notes the album "is all one needs for a definitive Turner playlist without any filler."

== Commercial performance ==
Icon debuted at number 20 on the U.S. Billboard Top Country Albums chart and number 114 on the Billboard 200, selling 5,144 copies in the first week. It received a boost in May 2011 after an appearance by Turner on American Idol with Scotty McCreery, with 3,086 copies sold, and climbed to number 98 on the Billboard 200. The album continued to sell, peaking at number 93 on Billboard 200 on chart dated December 8, 2012 based on Black Friday week sales of 12,990 copies. It was certified Gold by the RIAA on June 3, 2019. As of October 2019, the album has sold 506,100 copies in the U.S.

== Track listing ==
No.	Title	Writer(s)	Length
1.	"Firecracker"	Shawn Camp, Pat McLaughlin, Josh Turner	3:29
2.	"As Fast as I Could"	Jeremy Spillman, Turner	4:28
3.	"Would You Go with Me"	Camp, John Scott Sherrill	3:49
4.	"Backwoods Boy"	Turner	3:42
5.	"Your Man"	Chris DuBois, Jace Everett, Chris Stapleton	3:33
6.	"Long Black Train"	Turner	4:12
7.	"Everything Is Fine"	Turner	3:37
8.	"She'll Go on You"	Mark Narmore	4:04
9.	"Me and God"	Turner	3:01
10.	"All Over Me"	Rhett Akins, Dallas Davidson, Ben Hayslip	3:21
11.	"Why Don't We Just Dance"	Jim Beavers, Darrell Brown, Jonathan Singleton	3:12
Total length:			40:28

== Charts ==
=== Weekly charts ===
Chart (2011)	Peak position
US Top Country Albums (Billboard)	20
US Billboard 200	93

=== Year-end charts ===
Chart (2011)	Position
US Country Albums (Billboard)	60

Chart (2012)	Position
US Country Albums (Billboard)	41

== Certifications ==
Certifications for Icon
Region	Certification	Certified units/sales
United States (RIAA)	Gold	500,000^{‡}
^{‡} Sales+streaming figures based on certification alone.
