= Heaven, Heartache and the Power of Love =

Studio album by Trisha Yearwood
- Released: November 13, 2007
- Recorded: Sound Emporium, The Rukkus Room and Compass Sound Studio (Nashville, Tennessee).
- Genre: Country
- Length: 50:39
- Label: Big Machine
- Producers: Garth Fundis, Matraca Berg, Jim Collins

Trisha Yearwood chronology
Greatest Hits (2007)	Heaven, Heartache and the Power of Love (2007)	Love Songs (2008)

Singles from Heaven, Heartache and the Power of Love
- 1. "Heaven, Heartache and the Power of Love" Released: July 30, 2007; 2. "This Is Me You're Talking To" Released: January 14, 2008; 3. "They Call It Falling for a Reason" Released: July 26, 2008

Heaven, Heartache and the Power of Love is the eleventh studio album by American country music artist Trisha Yearwood. The album was released on November 13, 2007 on Big Machine Records and was produced by Garth Fundis.

Heaven, Heartache and the Power of Love was Yearwood's first studio album released since 2005's Jasper County and the first for the Big Machine record label. (In 2007, she exited MCA Nashville Records, her label of the previous 17 years, where she'd recorded ten studio albums between 1991 and 2005.) The album contains three singles that were spawned between 2007 and 2008.

== Background ==
Heaven, Heartache and the Power of Love was recorded in Nashville, Tennessee, United States in three separate locations: the Sound Emporium, Rukkus Room, and Compass Studio. The album itself consisted of 13 tracks of recorded material. Thom Jurek of Allmusic found that the album's production did not include any "studio gimmicks" such as "compression trickery". He also enjoyed the fact that musical instruments such as electric guitars and drums sounded traditional and not like 1970s rock arena music. Jonathan Keefe of Slant Magazine found Heaven, Heartache and the Power of Love to be a significant departure from any of Yearwood's previous releases. Keefe mentioned that the most recognizable departure was that it was recorded under an independent label, however the label has given more attention than thought of. Jim Malec of The 9513 believed that the album combined the genres of Contemporary country, Western, Americana, Blues, and traditional country music, while Jurek thought all of the album's tracks were recorded in a "country vein".

Heaven Heartache and the Power of Love's title track was said to resemble that of a Rockabilly song that "cuts right out of the gate" according to AllMusic. The album's second track "This Is Me You're Talking To" shifts into a ballad, a song that Jurek called a "non-stereotypical ballad/love song". Other songs on the album mix from uptempo to slow tempo. The sixth track "Let the Wind Chase You" featured background vocals from Australian country artist Keith Urban. The album's tenth track "Not a Bad Thing" was originally recorded by Canadian country artist Terri Clark on her 2003 release Pain to Kill and the closing track "Sing You Back to Me" was dedicated to Yearwood's father who had recently died.

In an interview with Country Music Television, Yearwood described how Heaven, Heartache and the Power of Love (compared with her previous efforts) sounded more confident when she recorded the album. Yearwood noted that finding a comfort zone when recording was more important than simply finding confidence.

"I think there's a comfort level. I used to worry so much about it being pitch-perfect and over-thinking things. As a demo singer, you would go into a studio and you'd have a limited amount of time to sing your songs. You were getting paid $40 a song, you did your own harmonies, and you got work because you knew the song when you got there and you worked fast and cheap. And then when you go to make your album, and you've been waiting your entire life to make that first album, you think, "Oh, my gosh. This is an album and it has to be perfect." As time passes, you learn how to do a better job, just like anything."

== Critical reception ==
Professional ratings
Review scores
Source	Rating
About.com	4.5/5 stars
AllMusic	4.5/5 stars
Paste	(average)
People	3/4 stars
Slant Magazine	4.5/5 stars
The 9513	5/5 stars

Jonathan Keefe of Slant Magazine gave Heaven, Heartache and the Power of Love four and a half out of five stars, noticing that she has "never sounded better" with the release of the album. Keefe also mentioned that the album should receive recognition from country radio because "more than half" of the album's songs could be used as radio singles: "Hopefully, Big Machine will make better choices in that regard than MCA did, because if country radio has any sense left at all, Heaven, Heartache, and the Power of Love should allow Yearwood to return to the top of the charts. It's a career-best effort from one of the genre's all-time greatest vocalists and a testament to the vitality, intelligence, and soulfulness of modern country's best music." The 9513's Jim Malec gave the release five out of five stars, calling the album in general "breathtaking". Malec noted that the difference between a "good album" and a "great" comes because the choice of material, saying that Yearwood recorded a "great album": "The difference between a good album and a great album always–always–comes down to songs and song selection. And while Yearwood has long since proven herself a superb vocalist, her albums have, on occasion, tapped into a fair bit of par-for-the-coursematerial. That is not a problem here."

Heaven, Heartache and the Power of Love received four and a half out of five stars from Thom Jurek at Allmusic. Jurek mentioned in the conclusion of his review that the album went beyond expectations for a country album to go, stating "The bottom line is this: Heaven, Heartache and the Power of Love is, without a shadow of a doubt, the finest, most consistent and deeply moving (not to mention fun) record she has ever cut. It carries the mark of a bona fide artist who understands herself well enough to know that a great song is not only communicable but is communication itself to the listener.This time out, Yearwood is in a class by herself, and if country radio/video/television get involved at all, she'll hit it out of the park. It's better than good, it's beyond expectation -- and it was high after Jasper County -- it's the best example of what a popular record -- not just a country one -- should aspire to be, period." At the 51st Grammy Awards, Heaven, Heartache and the Power of Love was nominated in the category for Best Country Album. In addition the second track "This Is Me You're Talking To" was nominated in the category for Best Female Country Vocal Performance and the sixth track "Let the Wind Chase You" was nominated for Best Country Collaboration with Vocals.

== Release and singles ==
Heaven, Heartache and the Power of Love's title track was released as the lead single on July 30, 2007. The song debuted at number 49 on the Billboard Hot Country Songs chart the week of July 28, 2007 and was the week's highest-debuting single. The single eventually peaked within the Top 20 on the Billboard country chart at number 19, while also reaching number 7 on the Billboard Bubbling Under Hot 100 singles chart. Heaven, Heartache and the Power of Love was officially released on November 13, 2007 and debuted at number 10 on the Billboard Top Country Albums chart and number 30 on the Billboard 200 albums chart, selling about 33,000 copies within its first week. In January 2008, the album's second track was released as the second single "This Is Me You're Talking To". The song debuted at number 58 on the Billboard country chart the week of January 12, 2008, while "Another Try," featuring Yearwood with country artist Josh Turner, debuted one position higher that same week at number 57. The single would peak at number 25 on the Billboard country chart. The third and final single spawned from the album was the fourth track "They Call It Falling for a Reason". Released on July 26, 2008, the song debuted at number 60 on the Billboard Hot Country Songs chart but only peaked at number 54.

== Track listing ==
No.	Title	Writer(s)	Length
1.	"Heaven, Heartache and the Power of Love"	Clay Mills, Tia Sillers	3:47
2.	"This Is Me You're Talking To"	Tommy Lee James, Karyn Rochelle	4:00
3.	"They Call It Falling for a Reason"	Matraca Berg, Jim Collins	4:11
4.	"Nothin' 'Bout Memphis"	Jessi Alexander, James	3:45
5.	"We Tried"	Morgane Hayes, Liz Rose, Chris Stapleton	3:19
6.	"Let the Wind Chase You" (featuring Keith Urban)	Sally Barris, Rochelle	4:08
7.	"The Dreaming Fields"	M. Berg, Gary Harrison	4:16
8.	"Cowboys Are My Weakness"	Hillary Lindsey, Jim McCormick, Rochelle	3:43
9.	"Help Me"	Leslie Satcher, Billy Joe Walker Jr.	3:33
10.	"Not a Bad Thing"	Dave Berg, Deanna Bryant, Sunny Russ	3:26
11.	"Nothin' About You Is Good for Me"	Rochelle	3:26
12.	"Drown Me"	Alexander, Pat McLaughlin	3:02
13.	"Sing You Back to Me"	Tony Arata, Gene Nelson	5:51

== Personnel ==
- Trisha Yearwood – lead vocals, harmony vocals (10)
- Reese Wynans – Hammond B3 organ (1, 4, 5, 10, 12), acoustic piano (4, 6, 9, 10, 12)
- Steve Cox – acoustic piano (2, 11), Hammond B3 organ (8)
- Gary "Bud" Smith – Hammond B3 organ (3)
- Steve Nathan – acoustic piano (7)
- Steven Sheehan – acoustic guitar (1, 4, 6), National guitar (1)
- Bryan Sutton – acoustic guitar (2, 8, 11, 13)
- Kurt Riles – acoustic guitar (3)
- Billy Joe Walker, Jr. – acoustic guitar (5, 9, 10, 12)
- Nathan Chapman – acoustic guitar (10)
- Johnny Garcia – electric guitar (1, 2, 4, 5, 6, 8–12)
- Kenny Greenberg – electric guitar (3–6, 10, 11, 12)
- Troy Lancaster – electric guitar (3)
- Sam Bush – mandolin (1)
- Dan Dugmore – lap steel guitar (1), steel guitar (2, 4, 5, 6, 8, 10, 11, 12)
- Scotty Sanders – steel guitar (3)
- Paul Franklin – steel guitar (9)
- Steve Mackey – bass (1, 2, 4, 5, 6, 8–12)
- Steve Bryant – bass (3)
- Chad Cromwell – drums (1, 3, 4, 6)
- Greg Morrow – drums (2, 5, 8–12)
- Eric Darken – percussion (1, 2, 4, 6, 8, 10, 11, 12), vibraphone (8)
- Jim Horn – baritone saxophone (4), tenor saxophone (4), horn arrangements (4)
- Chris Dunn – trombone (4)
- Steve Herman – trumpet (4)
- Stuart Duncan – fiddle (5), mandolin (10)
- Rob Hajacos – fiddle (8, 11)
- Jonathan Yudkin – strings (7), string arrangements and composer (7)
- Jessi Alexander – harmony vocals (1, 3)
- Jon Randall – harmony vocals (1)
- Bob Bailey – harmony vocals (4)
- Vicki Hampton – harmony vocals (4)
- Wes Hightower – harmony vocals (5, 9)
- Sonya Isaacs – harmony vocals (5, 9)
- Keith Urban – harmony vocals (6)
- Karyn Rochelle – harmony vocals (8, 11)
- Garth Fundis – harmony vocals (10)
- Jim Lauderdale – harmony vocals (12)

The Nashville String Machine (Tracks 2, 6 & 9)

- David Campbell – string arrangements and conductor (2, 6)
- Kristin Wilkinson – string arrangements and conductor (9)
- Anthony LaMarchina and Carole Rabinowitz – cello
- Monisa Angell and Gary Vanosdale – viola
- David Angell, Carl Gorodetzky, Cate Myer, Betty Small, Pamela Sixfin, Alan Umstead, Cathy Umstead and Mary Kathryn Vanosdale – violin

== Production ==
- Garth Fundis – producer
- Matraca Berg – producer (3)
- Jim Collins – producer (3)
- Chad Carlson – recording
- A.J. Derrick – recording
- Chuck Ainlay – additional recording, mixing
- Matt Andrews – additional recording
- Kyle Ford – second engineer, additional recording
- Bob Ludwig – mastering
- Gateway Mastering (Portland, Maine) – mastering location
- Juanita Copeland – production coordinator
- Tommy Colorigh – digital imaging
- Virginia Team – digital imaging
- Ron Roark – graphic design, art direction
- Bonnie Richardson – graphic design
- Sandi Spika Borchetta – art direction, wardrobe stylist
- Mark Tucker – photography
- Debbie Dover – hair stylist
- Lori Turk – make-up

== Sales chart positions ==
=== Weekly charts ===
Chart (2007)	Peak position
US Billboard 200	30
US Top Country Albums (Billboard)	10
UK Country Albums (Official Charts)	15

=== Year-end charts ===
Chart (2008)	Position
US Top Country Albums (Billboard)	45

=== Singles ===
Year	Song	Chart positions	
Year	Song	US Country	US
2007	"Heaven, Heartache and the Power of Love"	19	107
2008	"This Is Me You're Talking To"	25	—
2008	"They Call It Falling for a Reason"	54	—
"—" denotes releases that did not chart.
