= This Is Me You're Talking To =

Single by Trisha Yearwood

from the album Heaven, Heartache and the Power of Love
- B-side: "Bad for Me" (Danielle Peck)
- Released: January 14, 2008
- Genre: Country
- Length: 4:00
- Label: Big Machine
- Songwriters: Tommy Lee James; Karyn Rochelle
- Producer: Garth Fundis

Trisha Yearwood singles chronology
"Another Try" (2008)	"This Is Me You're Talking To" (2008)	"They Call It Falling for a Reason" (2008)

"This Is Me You're Talking To" is a song written by Tommy Lee James and Karyn Rochelle, and recorded by American country music artist Trisha Yearwood. It was released in January 2008 as the second single from her tenth studio album Heaven, Heartache and the Power of Love.

== Content ==
The song is a ballad about two lovers who encounter one another after a breakup, and the series of emotions that the chance encounter generates. "You're smilin' that smile you get when you're nervous, like you don't quite know what to do / But this is me you're talking to," Yearwood sings in the first verse.

== Critical reception ==
The single received positive reviews from most critics. Allmusic called the song, "devastatingly beautiful" and called the emotion from Yearwood's voice, "downright real." Billboard.com reviewed the song and called it "nothing but a modern classic." Engine 145 reviewed "This Is Me You're Talking To" in 2008, giving the song high praise, calling it, "Trisha Yearwood’s best vocal performance on a single recording to date," and describing it as "absolutely breathtaking."

== Music video ==
The video of "This Is Me You're Talking To" explains how a woman runs into her former lover, and handling the emotion from the encounter. Yearwood's lover is played by actor, John Corbett (who also plays the band's conductor and Trisha's sound engineer), and it was directed by Trey Fanjoy. It made its debut on CMT's Top 20 Countdown on March 6, 2008.

In it, Yearwood is shown recording the song in a church, which is acting as a recording studio. In the studio, there is a large television screen hanging behind Yearwood, showing two lovers meeting and eventually walking away on a snowy night, which helps explain the meaning of the song. Conducting the song's instruments is Yearwood's lover in the video. Throughout the video their relationship relates to the central idea of the song and throughout the video there are conversations between them back and forth. Later scenes of them go on to show Yearwood and Corbett hugging and departing from each other, as well as Yearwood singing by the piano which Corbett is playing.

== Chart performance ==
"This is Me You're Talking To" debuted at number 58 on the U.S. Billboard Hot Country Songs chart. It peaked at number 25 on the chart in May 2008, but spent nearly two months between number 25 and number 26 before it became recurrent. Its chart run overlapped with "Another Try", Yearwood's duet with Josh Turner, which was a Top 20 hit.

Chart (2008)	Peak position
US Hot Country Songs (Billboard)	25
