= I Serve a Savior =

Studio album by Josh Turner
- Released: October 26, 2018
- Studio: Sound Stage Studios and The Mix Mill (Nashville, Tennessee); Ken's Gold Club and Hound's Ear Studio (Franklin, Tennessee); Gaither Studios (Alexandria, Indiana)
- Genre: Christian country, gospel
- Length: 41:51
- Label: MCA Nashville
- Producer: Kenny Greenberg

Josh Turner chronology
Deep South (2017)	I Serve a Savior (2018)	Country State of Mind (2020)

I Serve a Savior is the seventh studio album by American country music artist Josh Turner. It was released on October 26, 2018, through MCA Nashville, and is Turner's first release to primarily consist of gospel music. The album was also bundled with a live performance DVD for release exclusively in Cracker Barrel stores that features an interview with Bill Gaither.

== Content ==
I Serve a Savior is a collection of mostly gospel music standards with a few original songs, such as the title track, which was co-written by Turner, and one that his wife and son wrote together. The album features new live recordings of two of his previous hit singles — "Long Black Train" and "Me and God" — as well as duets with Sonya Isaacs, Bobby Osborne, and Turner's own family (including his wife and four sons) on "The River (Of Happiness)".

Recording a gospel project was something Turner had "been wanting to do for a long time" and he decided that the timing was finally right for him to do it: "I didn't have any big plans for 2018 and my favorite part of my job is to go into the studio and create. I just felt like it was God's timing and I couldn't pass it up."

== Critical reception ==
Stephen Thomas Erlewine of AllMusic gave the album three stars out of five, praising the duets with Sonya Isaacs and Bobby Osborne and calling it a "a sturdy, comforting listen, which is precisely what it was intended to be."

== Commercial performance ==
The album debuted at No. 2 on Billboard's Top Country Albums and Top Christian Albums for charts dated November 10, 2018, selling 14,000 copies in the first week (15,000 in equivalent album units). It is Turner's first appearance on the Christian chart. The album sold a further 8,300 copies the second week. It has sold 147,000 copies in the United States as of March 2020.

== Track listing ==
No.	Title	Writer(s)	Length
1.	"I Saw the Light" (featuring Sonya Isaacs)	Hank Williams	3:21
2.	"I Pray My Way Out of Trouble" (featuring Bobby Osborne)	Loretta Lynn, Teddy Wilburn	3:39
3.	"Great Is Your Faithfulness"	Thomas Chisholm, William M. Runyan	4:14
4.	"Swing Low, Sweet Chariot"	Traditional	3:51
5.	"Without Him"	Mylon LeFevre	3:06
6.	"I Serve a Savior"	Mark Narmore, Josh Turner	4:08
7.	"How Great Thou Art" (featuring Sonya Isaacs)	Carl Boberg, Stuart K. Hine	4:23
8.	"The River (Of Happiness)" (live from Gaither Studios) (featuring The Turner Family)	Hampton Turner, Jennifer Turner	1:40
9.	"Amazing Grace"	John Newton	5:19
10.	"Long Black Train" (live from Gaither Studios)	Josh Turner	4:21
11.	"Doxology"	Thomas Ken, Anonymous Genevan Psalter	0:42
12.	"Me and God" (live from Gaither Studios)	Josh Turner	3:11

== Personnel ==
Adapted from AllMusic

- Josh Turner – lead vocals, acoustic guitar (10, 12)
- David Dorn – keyboards (1, 3, 7)
- Gordon Mote – acoustic piano (1–7, 9), organ (1, 2, 5, 6, 9), keyboards (4)
- Jennifer Turner – acoustic piano (8), vocals (8), backing vocals (10, 12)
- Matthew Holt – acoustic piano (10, 12)
- Kenny Greenberg – acoustic guitar (1–4, 7, 8, 12), electric guitar (5, 6, 9), baritone guitar (10)
- Carl Miner – acoustic guitar (1–7, 9, 10, 12), banjo (1), mandolin (2, 3, 5, 7, 10)
- Rob Ickes – dobro (2–4, 7, 10, 12), lap steel guitar (5, 9)
- Mike Johnson – pedal steel guitar (6)
- Hampton Turner – mandolin (8), vocals (8)
- Glenn Worf – upright bass (1–7), bass guitar (9)
- Jared Manzo – bass guitar (10), upright bass (12)
- Evan Hutchings – drums (1, 2, 4–6, 9, 10, 12)
- Glen Duncan – fiddle (1, 2)
- Perry Coleman – backing vocals (1, 3, 5–7, 9)
- Vicki Hampton – backing vocals (1, 3, 5–7, 9)
- Tania Hancheroff – backing vocals (1, 3, 5–7, 9, 10)
- Sonya Isaacs – backing vocals (1, 7)
- Bobby Osborne – backing vocals (2)
- Gale Mayes – backing vocals (4, 9)
- Angela Primm – backing vocals (4, 9)
- Colby Turner – vocals (8)
- Hawke Turner – vocals (8)
- Marion Turner – vocals (8)
- Mark Ivey – backing vocals (10, 12)
- Trey Keller – backing vocals (10, 12)

=== Production ===
- Brian Wright – A&R
- Kenny Greenberg – producer, overdub recording, vocal recording
- Mills Logan – recording (1–7, 9, 11), mixing (3, 4, 6, 7, 10–12)
- Chad Evans – live track recording (8, 10, 12), mixing (8)
- Michael Walter – overdub recording, vocal recording
- Justin Niebank – mixing (1, 2, 5, 9)
- Joel McKinney – recording assistant (1–7, 9, 11)
- John Willis – editing (1–7, 9, 11)
- Trey Keller – editing (8, 10, 12)
- Andrew Mendelson – mastering at Georgetown Masters (Nashville, Tennessee)
- Paige Connors – production coordinator
- Sarah Marie Burke – A&R production
- Josh Turner – art direction
- Karen Naff – art direction
- Craig Allen – design
- Kera Jackson – art production
- Michael Gomez – photography
- Ted Greene – management

== Charts ==
=== Weekly charts ===
Chart (2018)	Peak position
UK Christian & Gospel Albums (OCC)	11
US Billboard 200	41
US Top Country Albums (Billboard)	2
US Christian Albums (Billboard)	2

=== Year-end charts ===
Chart (2018)	Position
US Top Country Albums (Billboard)	99
Chart (2019)	Position
US Top Country Albums (Billboard)	84
