= Hometown Girl (song) =

Single by Josh Turner

from the album Deep South
- Released: May 31, 2016
- Recorded: 2016
- Genre: Country
- Length: 3:36
- Label: MCA Nashville
- Songwriter(s): Marc Beeson; Daniel Tashian
- Producer(s): Kenny Greenberg

Josh Turner singles chronology
| "Lay Low" (2014) | "Hometown Girl" (2016) | "All About You" (2017) |

"Hometown Girl" is a song recorded by American country music artist Josh Turner. It was released in May 2016 as the second single from his sixth studio album, Deep South. The song was written by Marc Beeson and Daniel Tashian.

== Music video ==
The music video was directed by Michael Monaco recorded in Live and acoustic and premiered on CMT, GAC & VEVO in 2016.

== Critical reception ==
The song peaked at number 2 on the Billboard Country Airplay chart dated May 6, 2017, making it Turner's first top 10 single since "Time Is Love" in 2012.

== Commercial performance ==
The song has sold 238,000 copies in the United States as of May 2017. It was certified Platinum on April 23, 2018 for a million units in sales and streams.

== Chart performance ==
| Chart (2016–2017) | Peak position |
|---|---|
| US Billboard Hot 100 | 56 |
| US Country Airplay (Billboard) | 2 |
| US Hot Country Songs (Billboard) | 5 |

=== Year-end charts ===
| Chart (2017) | Position |
|---|---|
| Canada Country (Billboard) | 42 |
| US Country Airplay (Billboard) | 30 |
| US Hot Country Songs (Billboard) | 38 |

== Certifications ==
| Region | Certification | Certified units/sales |
|---|---|---|
| United States (RIAA) | 2× Platinum | 2,000,000^{‡} |
^{‡} Sales+streaming figures based on certification alone.
