= They Call It Falling for a Reason =

Single by Trisha Yearwood

from the album Heaven, Heartache and the Power of Love
- Released: July 26, 2008
- Studio: Compass; Rukkus Room; Sound Emporium (Nashville, Tennessee)
- Genre: Country; contemporary country
- Length: 4:11
- Label: Big Machine
- Songwriter(s): Matraca Berg; Jim Collins
- Producer(s): Garth Fundis

Trisha Yearwood singles chronology
"This Is Me You're Talking To" (2008)	"They Call It Falling for a Reason" (2008)	"PrizeFighter" (2014)

"They Call It Falling for a Reason" is a song written by Matraca Berg and Jim Collins. It was originally recorded by American country artist Trisha Yearwood and first appeared on her 2007 studio album, Heaven, Heartache and the Power of Love. In 2008, it was released as the third single from the album. It reached a charting position on the Billboard country survey and received positive reviews from critics.

== Background and content ==
According to Billboard magazine, "They Call It Falling for a Reason" describes the feeling a person has when they first fall in love with someone, "that spine-tingling rush that takes one’s breath away and makes head and heart spin." The song was composed by Matraca Berg and Jim Collins. Berg also wrote a second track for the album which the song appeared on. Yearwood had previously recorded several additional compositions by Berg as well. The track was recorded and mixed at three studios: Compass, Rukkus Room and Sound Emporium. The sessions were produced by Garth Fundis, Yearwood's long-time record producer.

== Critical reception ==
"They Call It Falling for a Reason" received positive reviews from critics and writers. When reviewing Heaven, Heartache and the Power of Love, Thom Jurek of Allmusic praised the song, calling it traditional and developing a connection with the listener: "it dawns on the listener that this record is special, rooted deeply in the country tradition but not shying away from the contemporary rocking sound of it, either. This is another cooker, and it's so full of a lust for life, what with those guitars playing off one another and Yearwood pushing herself in a way she never has." Kevin John Coyne of Country Universe gave the single an "A" rating in his review: “A well-written, expertly performed and tastefully produced single that showcases Yearwood’s incomparable vocal talents without getting in the way of the song’s lyrics. The lyrics mention trapeze acts.” Billboard magazine praised Yearwood's voice on the track: "Yearwood turns in a gorgeous, engaging vocal performance, shimmering with sassy charm."

== Release and chart performance ==
"They Call It Falling for a Reason" was originally released on Yearwood's studio album, Heaven, Heartache and the Power of Love. The project was issued on November 13, 2007, via Big Machine Records. It was Yearwood's first album and single releases with the label. The song was spawned as the album's third single on July 26, 2008. It was also released through the Big Machine label. The song spent a total of seven weeks on the Billboard Hot Country Songs chart. In August 2008, it reached a peak of 54 on the chart. "They Call It Falling for a Reason" was Yearwood's final charting solo release until 2014's "PrizeFighter," which was a duet with Kelly Clarkson.

== Track listing ==
CD single

- "They Call It Falling for a Reason" – 4:11

== Charts ==
Chart (2008)	Peak position
US Hot Country Songs (Billboard)	54
