= Heaven, Heartache and the Power of Love (song) =

Single by Trisha Yearwood

from the album Heaven, Heartache and the Power of Love
- B-side: "Maybe She'll Get Lonely" (Jack Ingram)
- Released: July 30, 2007
- Genre: Country
- Length: 3:19 (single version); 3:47 (album version)
- Label: Big Machine
- Songwriters: Clay Mills, Tia Sillers
- Producer: Garth Fundis

Trisha Yearwood singles chronology
"Love Will Always Win" (2006)	"Heaven, Heartache and the Power of Love" (2007)	"Another Try" (2008)

"Heaven, Heartache, and the Power of Love" is a song written by Tia Sillers and Clay Mills, and recorded by American country music singer Trisha Yearwood. It was released in July 2007 as the first single and title track from her album also titled Heaven, Heartache and the Power of Love. The song reached its peak positions at the end of the year in 2007. The song became Yearwood's first single in nearly three years to become a major hit on the Billboard Country Chart since 2005's "Georgia Rain" from her album, Jasper County.

== Background ==
The song, "Heaven, Heartache And The Power Of Love" is the first song released from her Big Machine Records album of the same name, and was written by Clay Mills and Tia Sillers, and is the first track in the album and the title track from Yearwood's 2007 studio album, Heaven, Heartache, and the Power of Love. Slant Magazine gave the song a positive review, along with her album, calling the song "fiery".

== Content ==
The song is an up-tempo in which the female narrator describes her love life: first, having had her heart broken, and then having found another lover. In the chorus, she sings: "Heaven, that's where I'm going / Heartache, that's where I've been / Heaven, heartache, and the power of love."

== Chart performance ==
"Heaven, Heartache, and the Power of Love" became successful on the Country charts in 2007. It debuted on the Billboard Country Chart shortly after its release to Country radio in September 2007. However it was originally only released to the iTunes Store. The song spent a total of nearly four months on the Billboard Country Chart before peaking at #19 in December 2007, while it also reached a peak position of #107 on the Billboard Bubbling Under Hot 100 singles chart a week after it peaked on the Hot Country Songs chart. "Heaven, Heartache and the Power of Love" became Yearwood's first Top 20 single since 2005.

While also peaking on Both the Billboard Country Chart and the Bubbling Under Hot 100, "Heaven, Heartache, and the Power of Love" also peaked at #38 on the Hot Digital Songs chart in late 2007. The single became Yearwood's first single to chart on the Hot Digital Songs chart.

== Music video ==
The music video is set in two different scenes, in a church and in a gallery. The beginning of the video takes place in the church. The people sitting in the pews at the church are saying "thank you lord" and "halleujah", exemplifying the meaning of the song. Yearwood then walks and she starts off singing the beginning of "Heaven, Heartache, and the Power of Love", standing in the very front of the church, preaching to the people. The second scene starts about a minute into the song, where Yearwood if performing with a full band in the gallery. People dance to the song in the gallery. The video regularly shifts between the two scenes throughout the course of the video. At the very end, Yearwood is in the church, and the people in the church applaud her.

The music video debuted on CMT's Top Twenty Countdown in September 6, 2007. The music video was released to iTunes shortly after being released on CMT. The music video was directed by Trey Fanjoy, Trent Hardville, and Adam Little.

== Chart positions ==
Chart (2007)	Peak position
US Hot Country Songs (Billboard)	19
US Bubbling Under Hot 100 (Billboard)	7
