= Why Don't We Just Dance =

Single by Josh Turner

from the album Haywire
- Released: August 12, 2009
- Recorded: 2009
- Genre: Honky tonk; country
- Length: 3:14
- Label: MCA Nashville
- Songwriters: Jim Beavers; Darrell Brown; Jonathan Singleton
- Producer: Frank Rogers

Josh Turner singles chronology
| "Everything Is Fine" (2008) | "Why Don't We Just Dance" (2009) | "All Over Me" (2010) |

Music video
- "Why Don't We Just Dance" at CMT.com

"Why Don't We Just Dance" is a song written by Jim Beavers, Jonathan Singleton, and Darrell Brown, and recorded by American country music artist Josh Turner. It was released in August 2009 as the lead-off single from his album Haywire, which was released on February 9, 2010. It became Turner's third number one hit in February 2010, his first since "Would You Go With Me" in October 2006, and his longest stay at the top for four weeks. On May 24, 2010, the single was his fourth to be certified Gold by the RIAA.

== Content ==
"Why Don't We Just Dance" is a moderate up-tempo song, featuring a production with piano, steel guitar fills, and fiddle. The song's narrator suggests to his lover that they dance in the living room to forget each other's troubles.

Turner said the song, which was written by Jim Beavers, Jonathan Singleton, and Darrell Brown, caught his attention the first listen. "It's an up-tempo, traditional country song that has a very catchy melody with a lyric that poses the question 'why don't we just dance?' and forget about all of the bad stuff going on the world and just concentrate on each other."

== Critical reception ==
"Why Don't We Just Dance" received mostly positive feedback from critics. Juli Thanki of Engine 145 gave the song a thumbs up, describing it as "three minutes of escapist fun, and Turner’s charming performance on the track is further proof that he’s one of country music’s most talented young A-listers; this may not be the greatest vocal turn of his career but it’s still a pleasure to listen to." She also drew comparisons to Neal McCoy’s 1995 single "They're Playin' Our Song" and Turner's 2007 single "Firecracker". Bobby Peacock of Roughstock gave a positive review, describing the song as "a step in the right direction." He thought Turner's performance "recall[ed] the seductive swagger of Conway Twitty" and praised the production for having "an infectious, syncopated rhythm and a catchy melody that shows off the deeper end of Josh's range quite effectively." Kevin J. Coyne of Country Universe gave the song a B rating. Although he thought that "Turner is charming as ever," he added that "he has a bit of trouble keeping up with the beat as he tosses off the lyrics" and said the song is "about as deep as Vegas rainfall."

== Music video ==
The music video, which was directed by Deaton-Flanigen Productions, premiered on GAC's Monday Music Mania on October 5, 2009 and on CMT on October 8, 2009. Turner is shown inside a house, observing a couple (played by real-life couple Ciaran McCarthy and Ashley Anderson) dancing in the living room. Throughout the video, the couple changes clothes and dancing styles, showcasing different decades beginning with the 1950s through present day. According to Country Weekly magazine, Turner was "elated to discover that he wouldn't have to do any acting" in the video.

The video was ranked #39 on GAC's Top 50 Videos of the Year.

== Personnel ==
- Lead Vocals: Josh Turner
- Background Vocals: Wes Hightower and Russell Terrell
- Drums: Shannon Forrest
- Bass: Kevin "Swine" Greantt
- Acoustic guitar: Bryan Sutton
- Electric guitar: J. T. Corenflos and Brent Rowan
- Piano: Gordon Mote
- Fiddle: Aubrey Haynie
- Steel: Steve Hinson
- Percussion: Eric Darken

== Chart performance ==
"Why Don't We Just Dance" debuted at #57 on the U.S. Billboard Hot Country Songs chart for the week of September 5, 2009. On the week ending November 28, 2009, it also debuted at #99 on the U.S. Billboard Hot 100. In January 2010, it became his first Top 10 single since "Firecracker" reached #2 in 2007. On the chart week of February 20, 2010, it became his third Number One song and his first since "Would You Go with Me" in October 2006. It also debuted at #97 on the Canadian Hot 100 chart for the week of February 20, 2010.

=== Weekly charts ===
| Chart (2009–2010) | Peak position |
|---|---|
| Canada Hot 100 (Billboard) | 59 |
| US Billboard Hot 100 | 35 |
| US Hot Country Songs (Billboard) | 1 |

=== Year-end charts ===
| Chart (2010) | Position |
|---|---|
| US Country Songs (Billboard) | 3 |

=== Decade-end charts ===
| Chart (2010–2019) | Position |
|---|---|
| US Hot Country Songs (Billboard) | 28 |

== Certifications ==
| Region | Certification | Certified units/sales |
|---|---|---|
| United States (RIAA) | 2× Platinum | 2,000,000^{‡} |
^{‡} Sales+streaming figures based on certification alone.
