= Haywire (Josh Turner album) =

Studio album by Josh Turner
- Released: February 9, 2010
- Studio: Sound Kitchen and The Castle (Franklin, Tennessee); Blackbird Studios, Studio 44 and Sound Emporium (Nashville, Tennessee)
- Genre: Country
- Length: 39:58
- Label: MCA Nashville
- Producer: Frank Rogers

Josh Turner chronology
Everything Is Fine (2007)	Haywire (2010)	Icon (2011)

Singles from Haywire
- 1. "Why Don't We Just Dance" Released: August 12, 2009; 2. "All Over Me" Released: April 5, 2010; 3. "I Wouldn't Be a Man" Released: October 25, 2010

Haywire is the fourth studio album by American country music singer Josh Turner. It was released on February 9, 2010, via MCA Nashville and debuted at number five on the U.S. Billboard 200, and number two on the Top Country Albums, selling 85,000 copies. The album produced three singles, including the Number One hits "Why Don't We Just Dance" and "All Over Me." As with his previous three studio albums, Turner worked with producer Frank Rogers.

== Background ==
After the release of "Why Don't We Just Dance" in August, Turner's website announced that the album would be released on November 10, but on October 2, online magazine Country Standard Time reported that the release of Haywire was delayed until February 9, 2010.

On January 12, 2010, Billboard published an album preview of Haywire, where Turner talked about the new album. Regarding its content, Turner told Billboard that the album "goes a little deeper about love and relationships" than previous records.

Eight days later, Engine 145 released an interview with Turner. When asked why he decided to name his new CD Haywire, Turner responded that the title track "felt pretty relevant as to the world right now and my life, too." When asked about following the theme of Haywire in terms of songs, he said, "If I had to sum it up, it would be energy, a lot of positive energy. It’s an album that’s full of songs that will make people dance. There’s a lot of passion there. Vocally, I stepped out of my box more; I let ‘er rip and you can hear that on a lot of different songs, whether it be a ballad or an uptempo."

== Content ==
The album's first single is "Why Don't We Just Dance". Written by Jim Beavers, Darrell Brown and Jonathan Singleton, it was released to radio on August 12, 2009, and became Turner's third Number One hit in February 2010. Following it on the album is "I Wouldn't Be a Man," which was originally a Top Ten hit for Don Williams in 1987, and was also a minor chart hit nine years later by Billy Dean.

"All Over Me" was released as the second single from the album in April 2010, and peaked at Number One in October of that year. "I Wouldn't Be a Man" was released as the third single in November 2010, and was a minor Top 20 country hit, peaking at number 18 in July 2011.

The deluxe edition includes live recordings of Turner's previous singles "Long Black Train" and "Your Man," two other bonus songs, and the music video for "Why Don't We Just Dance."

The track "Lovin' You on My Mind" was later recorded by its co-writer Chris Stapleton on his 2023 album Higher.

== Reception ==
=== Commercial ===
Haywire debuted at number five on the U.S. Billboard 200 and at number two on the U.S. Billboard Top Country Albums, selling 85,000 copies in its first week of release. As of November 2010, the album has sold 330,000 copies in the U.S. It was certified Gold by the RIAA on March 25, 2017.

=== Critical ===
Professional ratings
Review scores
Source	Rating
Allmusic	2.5/5 stars
Billboard	(mixed)
Country Weekly	4/5 stars
Entertainment Weekly	(B−)
PopMatters	7/10 stars
Roughstock	(favorable)
Slant Magazine	3/5 stars
Engine 145	3.5/5 stars

Upon its release, Haywire received generally positive reviews from most music critics. At Metacritic, which assigns a normalized rating out of 100 to reviews from mainstream critics, the album received an average score of 63, based on 5 reviews, which indicates "generally favorable reviews".

Thom Jurek of Allmusic commended the production, which he described as "reined in sonically with more acoustic instrumentation, less compression, and vocals placed properly in their relation to the instrumental mix" but thought that "the song choices that make this set sound so flat" giving it 2½ stars out of 5. Jessica Phillips of Country Weekly magazine gave the album four stars out of five, saying that it followed in the formula set by Turner's previous three albums, adding that its song selection "complements Josh's booming, polished bass voice better than those on albums past" despite also saying that the album "takes few new risks.".

PopMatters critic Dave Heaton gave it a "Damn Good" rating, saying "There is a carefree feeling to Haywire that’s infectious, that makes the album’s ordinariness not matter", and commended his "deep, supple voice". Juli Thanki of country music blog Engine 145 also gave the album a positive review; praising Turner as "the finest male voice on country radio," but commenting that the album lacked any "exceptional songs." Thanki gave the album 3½ stars out of 5.

Matt Bjorke with Roughstock gave it a favorable review, saying "Haywire is one of Josh Turner’s most consistent albums and it really feels like a record that will help keep him a radio star". Slant Magazine critic Jonathan Keefe reviewed the album's material unfavorably, referring to the material as "pure vanilla" and saying "a stuffy, aesthetically conservative set of songs at odds with Turner's stated intentions of loosening up a bit," though he noted that Turner's vocal performances attempt to bring "some life and personality" to the songs and rated the set with three stars out of five.

== Track listing ==
Standard/CD/MP3 download
No.	Title	Writer(s)	Length
1.	"Why Don't We Just Dance"	Jim Beavers, Jonathan Singleton, Darrell Brown	3:12
2.	"I Wouldn't Be a Man"	Mike Reid, Rory Bourke	3:32
3.	"Haywire"	Josh Turner	3:24
4.	"Your Smile"	Elliot Park	3:35
5.	"Lovin' You on My Mind"	Kendell Marvel, Chris Stapleton, Tim James	3:39
6.	"As Fast as I Could"	Jeremy Spillman, Turner	4:27
7.	"I'll Be There"	Phillip White, Steven Dale Jones	3:38
8.	"All Over Me"	Rhett Akins, Dallas Davidson, Ben Hayslip	3:19
9.	"Eye Candy"	Turner, Pat McLaughlin, Shawn Camp	2:53
10.	"Friday Paycheck"	Turner, Mark Narmore	4:00
11.	"The Answer"	Turner, Narmore	4:14
Total length:			39:58

Deluxe Edition
No.	Title	Writer(s)	Length
12.	"This Kind of Love"	Turner	3:39
13.	"Let's Find a Church"	Turner	3:25
14.	"Long Black Train (live)"	Turner	4:57
15.	"Your Man (live)"	Stapleton, Chris DuBois, Jace Everett	3:45
Total length:			56:34

== Personnel ==
Technical

- Frank Rogers – producer
- Richard Barrow – recording, overdub recording, string recording (5), digital editing
- Manny Rogers – keyboard recording (7)
- Steve Beers – recording assistant, string recording assistant (5)
- Steve Blackmon – recording assistant
- Seth Morton – overdub assistant
- Mark Pettacia – overdub assistant
- Lowell Reynolds – overdub assistant
- Mike Rooney – overdub assistant
- Brady Barnett – digital editing
- Tyler Moles – digital editing
- Phillip Stein – digital editing, production assistant
- Brian David Willis – digital editing
- Justin Niebank – mixing
- Drew Bollman – mix assistant
- Hank Williams – mastering at MasterMix (Nashville, Tennessee)
- Craig Allen – art direction, design
- Josh Turner – art direction, photography
- George Holz – photography
- Trish Townsend – wardrobe stylist
- Paula Turner – hair, make-up
- Ted Greene – management

Musicians (Tracks 1–13)

- Josh Turner – lead vocals
- Gordon Mote – acoustic piano (1–9, 11, 12), Wurlitzer electric piano (2, 5, 10, 12), Hammond B3 organ (11)
- Frank Rogers – keyboards (7)
- Steve Nathan – acoustic piano (13)
- Bryan Sutton – acoustic guitars (1–6, 9, 11–13), banjo (4, 8), gut-string guitar (7), National guitar (8, 10)
- Brent Rowan – electric guitars (1–6, 8–13), baritone guitar (4, 5, 7)
- J. T. Corenflos – electric guitars (1, 3, 8, 9)
- Brett Mason – electric guitars (13)
- Steve Hinson – steel guitar (1–3, 5, 7, 9–12), dobro (4), slide guitar (8)
- Mike Johnson – pedabro (6)
- Paul Franklin – steel guitar (13)
- Aubrey Haynie – fiddle (1, 3, 6–13), mandolin (2, 4, 5, 10, 12)
- Kevin Grantt – bass guitar (1–6, 8, 9, 11–13), upright bass (7, 10)
- Shannon Forrest – drums
- Eric Darken – percussion
- David Angell – strings (5)
- Zeneba Bowers – strings (5)
- David Davidson – strings (5)
- Connie Heard – strings (5)
- Kristin Wilkinson – strings (5), string arrangements (5)
- John Hobbs – string arrangements (5), string conductor (5)
- Wes Hightower – backing vocals (1–10, 12, 13)
- Russell Terrell – backing vocals (1–10, 12, 13)
- Chris Stapleton – backing vocals (5)
- Chip Davis – choir (11)
- Gale Mayes – choir (11)
- Angela Primm – choir (11)
- Ladye Love Smith – choir (11)
- Reggie Smith – choir (11)

Musicians (Tracks 14 & 15)

- Josh Turner – lead vocals
- Jennifer Turner – keyboards (14), acoustic piano (14), backing vocals (14)
- Kevin Haynie – acoustic guitar, banjo
- Derek Wells – electric guitar
- Justin Schipper – steel guitar, dobro
- Jordan Lawson – mandolin, fiddle, backing vocals
- Joey Click – bass
- TJ Wilder – drums

== Charts ==
=== Weekly charts ===
Chart (2010)	Peak position
US Billboard 200	5
US Top Country Albums (Billboard)	2

=== Year-end charts ===
Chart (2010)	Position
US Billboard 200	103
US Top Country Albums (Billboard)	15
Chart (2011)	Position
US Top Country Albums (Billboard)	59

== Certifications ==
Region	Certification	Certified units/sales
United States (RIAA)	Platinum	1,000,000^{‡}
^{‡} Sales+streaming figures based on certification alone.
