= Hannah, South Carolina =

Hannah
- Unincorporated community
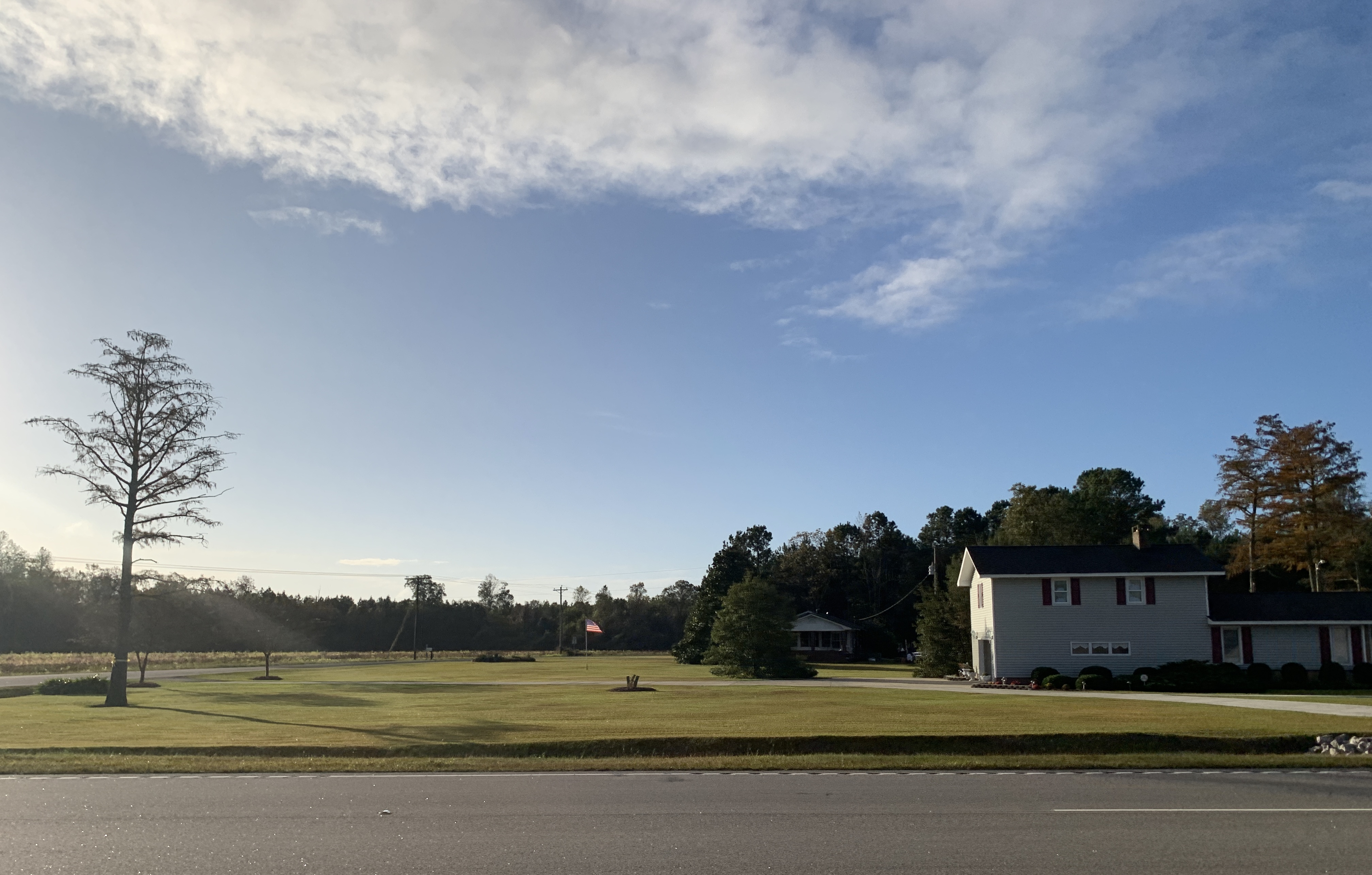

- Location within South Carolina Location within the United States
- Coordinates: 33°53′00″N 79°34′49″W
- Country: United States
- State: South Carolina
- County: Florence
- Elevation: 62 ft (19 m)
- Time zone: UTC-5 (Eastern (EST))
  - Summer (DST): UTC-4 (EDT)
- ZIP code: 29583
- Area codes: 843, 854
- GNIS feature ID: 1231363

Hannah is an unincorporated community in Florence County, South Carolina, United States. The nearest town is Pamplico. It is best known as the home of country music singer Josh Turner.

== See also ==
- Lynches River
