= Country State of Mind (album) =

Studio album by Josh Turner
- Released: August 21, 2020
- Studio: UMG Studios Nashville, Studio 818, ColorWheel Music and Blackbird Studios (Nashville, Tennessee); Breckenridge Studios, Ken's Gold Club, The Man Room and Hound's Ear Studio (Franklin, Tennessee); Evan's Place (Brentwood, Tennessee); A'ala Recording (Maui, Hawaii)
- Genre: Country
- Length: 37:29
- Label: MCA Nashville
- Producer: Kenny Greenberg

Josh Turner chronology
I Serve a Savior (2018)	Country State of Mind (2020)	King Size Manger (2021)

Country State of Mind is the eighth studio album by American country music singer Josh Turner. It was released on August 21, 2020, via MCA Nashville.

== Content ==
The album is composed entirely of cover songs. First released was Turner's cover of Randy Travis's "Forever and Ever, Amen", which features Travis on duet vocals. The recording was Travis's first since his 2013 stroke. Other artists whose songs are covered on the album include Patty Loveless, Vern Gosdin, Hank Williams, and Hank Williams Jr. Kris Kristofferson provides duet vocals on a cover of his own "Why Me", and John Anderson on his "I've Got It Made". Other collaborators on the album include Chris Janson (who sings on the title track), Allison Moorer, Runaway June, and Maddie & Tae.

== Critical reception ==
Rating it 3.5 out of 5 stars, Stephen Thomas Erlewine of AllMusic stated that "Unlike some country covers albums, Country State of Mind doesn't rely heavily on shopworn classics." He also called the album "simple, straightforward, and satisfying", praising the inclusion of cover songs from the 1980s as well as the vocal contributions of Anderson and Kristofferson.

== Track listing ==
No.	Title	Writer(s)	Length
1.	"I'm No Stranger to the Rain"	Sonny Curtis, Ron Hellard	3:52
2.	"I've Got It Made" (featuring John Anderson)	Max D. Barnes	2:56
3.	"Why Me" (featuring Kris Kristofferson)	Kris Kristofferson	3:02
4.	"Country State of Mind" (featuring Chris Janson)	Hank Williams Jr., Roger Alan Wade	4:03
5.	"I Can Tell by the Way You Dance (You're Gonna Love Me Tonight)"	Sandy Pinkard, Bob Strandlund	3:26
6.	"Alone and Forsaken" (featuring Allison Moorer)	Hank Williams Sr.	3:17
7.	"Forever and Ever, Amen" (featuring Randy Travis)	Paul Overstreet, Don Schlitz	3:49
8.	"Midnight in Montgomery"	Alan Jackson, Don Sampson	3:47
9.	"Good Ol' Boys (Theme From the Dukes of Hazzard)"	Waylon Jennings	2:53
10.	"You Don't Seem to Miss Me" (featuring Runaway June)	Jim Lauderdale	4:06
11.	"Desperately" (featuring Maddie & Tae)	Bruce Robison, Monte Warden	3:56
12.	"The Caretaker"	Johnny Cash	2:18

== Personnel ==
Adapted from AllMusic

- Josh Turner – vocals, backing vocals, acoustic guitar
- David Dorn – keyboards
- Gordon Mote – acoustic piano, Wurlitzer electric piano, synthesizers, Hammond B3 organ
- Jeff Linsenmaier – programming
- Justin Niebank – programming
- Kenny Greenberg – programming, acoustic guitar, electric guitars, electric baritone guitar, steel guitar
- Danny Rader – acoustic guitar, hi-string guitar, banjo, dobro
- Dan Dugmore – lap steel guitar
- Mike Johnson – dobro, steel guitar
- Joe Spivey – fiddle, mandolin
- Kevin "Swine" Grantt – bass, harmonica
- Glenn Worf – bass
- Chad Cromwell – drums
- Evan Hutchings – drums, percussion
- Perry Coleman – backing vocals
- LaShanda Evans – backing vocals
- Vicki Hampton – backing vocals
- Tania Hancheroff – backing vocals
- Terrell Hunt – backing vocals
- Trey Keller – backing vocals
- John Anderson – vocals (2)
- Kris Kristofferson – vocals (3)
- Chris Janson – vocals (4)
- Allison Moorer – vocals (6)
- Randy Travis – vocals (7)
- Naomi Cooke – vocals (10)
- Natalie Stovall – backing vocals (10)
- Jennifer Wayne – backing vocals (10)
- Taylor Dye – backing vocals (11)
- Maddie Font – backing vocals (11

=== Production ===
- Brian White – A&R
- Kenny Greenberg – producer, additional engineer
- Mills Logan – recording
- Jacob Butler – recording assistant
- Michelle Freetly – recording assistant
- Tommy Cecil – additional engineer
- Andrew Fowler – additional engineer
- Evan Hutchings – additional engineer
- Trey Keller – additional engineer
- Jeff Kerr – additional engineer
- Jeff Linsenmaier – additional engineer
- Michael Walter – additional engineer
- Micah Wilshire – additional engineer, mixing (11)
- Justin Niebank – mixing (1–10, 12)
- Drew Bollman – mix assistant
- Jim DeMain – mastering at Yes Master (Nashville, Tennessee)
- Amy Marie – mastering assistant
- Sarah Marie Butler – A&R production
- Shannon Finnegan – production coordinator
- Josh Turner – art direction
- Craig Allen – art direction, design
- Renee Behrman-Grelman – art direction
- Kera Jackson – art production
- David McClister – photography
- Paula Turner – grooming
- Colleen Runné – grooming
- Katy Robbins – stylist
- Modern Management, Inc. – management

== Charts ==
Chart (2020)	Peak position
US Billboard 200	131
US Top Country Albums (Billboard)	14
