= Everything Is Fine =

Studio album by Josh Turner
- Released: October 30, 2007
- Studios: Blackbird Studios (Nashville, Tennessee); The Castle and Sound Kitchen (Franklin, Tennessee)
- Genre: Country
- Length: 47:22
- Label: MCA Nashville
- Producer: Frank Rogers

Josh Turner chronology
Your Man (2006)	Everything Is Fine (2007)	Haywire (2010)

Singles from Everything Is Fine
- 1. "Firecracker" Released: July 24, 2007; 2. "Another Try" Released: January 7, 2008; 3. "Everything Is Fine" Released: August 18, 2008

Professional ratings
Review scores
Source	Rating
Allmusic	4/5 stars
Entertainment Weekly	B+
Slant Magazine	3/5 stars

Everything Is Fine is the third studio album by American country music artist Josh Turner, released on October 30, 2007. "Firecracker" was the first single released, reaching No. 2 on the Hot Country Songs charts, and was followed by "Another Try", which peaked at No. 15 on the same chart. The title track was released as the album's third single and reached No. 20.

The album debuted at number five on the U.S. Billboard 200 chart, selling about 84,000 copies in its first week. On December 3, 2007, it was certified Gold by the RIAA.

"One Woman Man" was previously recorded by George Jones on his 1989 album of the same name, and before that by Johnny Horton, its co-writer, in 1956.

== Track listing ==
No.	Title	Writer(s)	Length
1.	"Everything Is Fine"	Josh Turner	3:35
2.	"Firecracker"	Shawn Camp, Pat McLaughlin, Turner	3:29
3.	"Another Try" (duet with Trisha Yearwood)	Chris Stapleton, Jeremy Spillman	3:46
4.	"So Not My Baby"	Camp, Phillip Lammonds	3:34
5.	"Trailerhood"	Turner	3:22
6.	"Baby, I Go Crazy"	John Anderson, Turner	3:24
7.	"Nowhere Fast" (duet with Anthony Hamilton)	Anthony Hamilton, Kelvin Wooten	5:31
8.	"The Longer the Waiting (The Sweeter the Kiss)"	Roger Cook, McLaughlin	5:01
9.	"One Woman Man"	Tillman Franks, Johnny Horton	2:30
10.	"Soulmate"	Anderson, Turner	3:50
11.	"The Way He Was Raised"	Mark Narmore, Bobby Tomberlin, Turner	4:32
12.	"South Carolina Low Country"	Turner	4:48
Total length:			47:22

== Personnel ==
- Josh Turner – vocals
- Gordon Mote – clavinet (2, 5), acoustic piano (3, 4, 6–12), Hammond B3 organ (3, 7, 11), Wurlitzer electric piano (4, 7)
- Brent Rowan – electric guitars (1, 2, 4–11), baritone guitar (1–4, 6–8, 10–12)
- Bryan Sutton – banjo (1, 5, 12), National guitar (1), acoustic guitars (2–5, 7–9, 11, 12)
- B. James Lowry – acoustic guitars (6, 10), high-strung guitar (10)
- Steve Hinson – steel guitar (1, 2, 4–11), dobro (3)
- Mike Johnson – dobro (11), pedabro (12)
- Aubrey Haynie – fiddle (1–3, 5, 6, 9–11), mandolin (4, 6–8, 10–12)
- Kevin "Swine" Grantt – bass guitar (1–7, 11), upright bass (8–10, 12)
- Shannon Forrest – drums (1, 3, 5, 7–9)
- John Gardner – drums (2, 4, 6, 10)
- Chad Cromwell – drums (11, 12)
- Eric Darken – percussion
- Kirk "Jelly Roll" Johnson – harmonica (4)
- Jay Dawson – bagpipes (8)
- Wes Hightower – backing vocals (1, 2, 4–12)
- Russell Terrell – backing vocals (1, 2, 4–12)
- Trisha Yearwood – vocals (3)
- Anthony Hamilton – vocals (7)
- Liana Manis – backing vocals (10)

String section on "Another Try"

- John Hobbs – arrangements, conductor
- Kris Wilkinson – arrangements
- David Angell, Monisa Angell, David Davidson, Anthony LaMarchina, Pamela Sixfin, Mary Kathryn Vanosdale and Kris Wilkinson – string players

=== Production ===
- Frank Rogers – producer
- Richard Barrow – recording, overdub recording, string recording (3)
- Justin Niebank – mixing
- Drew Bollman – overdub recording, mix assistant
- Neal Cappellino – overdub recording
- Kenzi Butler – recording assistant
- Matt Coles – recording assistant, overdub assistant
- J.C. Monterrosa – recording assistant
- Ben Terry – recording assistant
- John Netti – overdub assistant
- Lowell Reynolds – string recording assistant (3)
- Brian Barnett – digital editing
- Tyler Moles – digital editing
- Brian David Willis – digital editing
- Hank Williams – mastering at MasterMix (Nashville, Tennessee)
- Phillip Stern – production assistant
- Craig Allen – art direction
- Josh Turner – art direction
- Russ Harrington – photography
- Mark Tucker – photography
- Ted Greene – management
- Modern Management – management

== Chart performance and certifications ==
Everything Is Fine peaked at number five on the U.S. Billboard 200, and debuted at number three on the Top Country Albums. In November 2007, it was certified Gold by the RIAA.

=== Weekly charts ===
Chart (2007)	Peak position
US Billboard 200	5
US Top Country Albums (Billboard)	3

=== Year-end charts ===
Chart (2007)	Position
US Top Country Albums (Billboard)	69
Chart (2008)	Position
US Billboard 200	103
US Top Country Albums (Billboard)	20

=== Sales and certifications ===
Region	Certification	Certified units/sales
United States (RIAA)	Gold	500,000^{^}
^{^} Shipments figures based on certification alone.
