= Long Black Train =

Studio album by Josh Turner
- Released: October 14, 2003
- Studios: Sound Kitchen (Franklin, Tennessee); Ocean Way Nashville, Thelma's East, The Ice Box, Dirty Secrets and MasterMix (Nashville, Tennessee)
- Genres: Country, Southern gospel, bluegrass
- Length: 39:27
- Label: MCA Nashville
- Producers: Mark Wright; Frank Rogers

Josh Turner chronology
Long Black Train (2003)	Your Man (2006)

Singles from Long Black Train
- 1. "She'll Go on You" Released: September 2002; 2. "Long Black Train" Released: July 23, 2003; 3. "What It Ain't" Released: April 2004

Professional ratings
Review scores
Source	Rating
Allmusic	3/5 stars
PopMatters	

Long Black Train is the debut studio album from American country music artist Josh Turner, released on October 14, 2003. It peaked at No. 29 on the U.S. Billboard 200, and peaked at No. 4 on the Top Country Albums. Overall, the album produced three chart singles for Turner on the Hot Country Songs charts: "She'll Go on You" (No. 46), the title track (No. 13), and "What It Ain't" (No. 31).

Two of this album's tracks were previously recorded by other artists. "You Don't Mess Around with Jim" is a cover of a Jim Croce hit single from 1972, while "The Difference Between a Woman and a Man" was previously recorded by Doug Stone on his 1999 album Make Up in Love.

== Track listing ==
No.	Title	Writer(s)	Length
1.	"Long Black Train"	Josh Turner	4:10
2.	"In My Dreams"	Casey Beathard, Tony Martin	3:34
3.	"What It Ain't"	Tim Mensy, Monty Criswell	3:27
4.	"I Had One One Time"	Harley Allen, Don Sampson	3:16
5.	"Jacksonville†"	Turner, Pat McLaughlin	3:56
6.	"Backwoods Boy"	Turner	3:41
7.	"Unburn All Our Bridges"	Jamie O'Hara	3:19
8.	"You Don't Mess Around with Jim†"	Jim Croce	3:18
9.	"She'll Go on You"	Mark Narmore	4:03
10.	"Good Woman Bad†"	McLaughlin, Roger Younger	3:00
11.	"The Difference Between a Woman and a Man†"	Bobby Braddock	3:43
Total length:			39:27

†Omitted from 2004 reissue.

== Chart performance ==
Long Black Train peaked at No. 29 on the U.S. Billboard 200, and peaked at No. 4 on the Top Country Albums. On January 7, 2004, it was certified Gold and on November 19, 2004, it was certified Platinum by the RIAA.

== Charts ==
=== Weekly charts ===
Chart (2004)	Peak position
US Billboard 200	29
US Top Country Albums (Billboard)	3

=== Year-end charts ===
Chart (2004)	Position
US Billboard 200	95
US Top Country Albums (Billboard)	14

== Certifications ==
Region	Certification	Certified units/sales
United States (RIAA)	Platinum	1,000,000^{^}
^{^} Shipments figures based on certification alone.

== Personnel ==
Musicians

- Josh Turner – lead vocals
- Steve Nathan – acoustic piano
- Brent Rowan – electric guitar (1, 4–7, 9–11), acoustic guitar (2), baritone guitar (2, 8), six-string bass guitar (4)
- Bryan Sutton – acoustic guitar (1, 4, 5, 7–11), banjo (1, 3, 6), gut string guitar (4), resonator guitar (10)
- Frank Rogers – electric guitar (2), baritone guitar solo (9)
- Brent Mason – electric guitar (3, 5, 10)
- Pat McLaughlin – acoustic guitar (5, 6), backing vocals (10)
- Mike Johnson – pedabro (1)
- Steve Hinson – steel guitar (2, 3, 5–7), dobro (8)
- Paul Franklin – steel guitar (4, 9–11)
- Aubrey Haynie – fiddle, mandolin (2)
- Kevin "Swine" Grantt – upright bass (1, 8, 10), bass guitar (2–7, 9, 11)
- Shannon Forrest – drums
- Eric Darken – percussion, vibraphone (2, 4)
- Charlie McCoy – harmonica (5)
- Bergen White – string arrangements (4, 7, 8)
- Carl Gorodetzky – string conductor (4, 7, 8)
- Nashville String Machine – string orchestra (4, 7, 8)
- Wes Hightower – backing vocals (1, 2, 4–7, 9–11)
- Russell Terrell – backing vocals (1–5, 7–11)
- John Wesley Ryles – backing vocals (3)
- Lisa Cochran – backing vocals (8)
- Melodie Crittenden – backing vocals (8)
- Liana Manis – backing vocals (11)

Technical

- Frank Rogers – producer
- Mark Wright – producer
- Greg Droman – recording, mixing
- David Schober – string recording
- Todd Gunnerson – recording assistant, mix assistant
- Greg Fogie – string recording assistant
- Richard Barrow – additional recording
- Jason Lehning – additional recording, digital editing
- Brian David Willis – additional recording, digital editing
- Grey Banner – digital editing
- Adam Hatley – digital editing
- Ronnie Thomas – digital editing
- Hank Williams – mastering at MasterMix (Nashville, Tennessee)
- C.A. Dreyer – production assistant
- Carie Higdon – production assistant
- Craig Allen – art direction, design
- Katie Gillon – art direction
- Mark Tucker – photography
- Josh Turner – photography
- Trish Townsend – stylist
- Lora Powell – hair, make-up
- Jimmy Gilmer – management
- Brinson Strickland – management
