= Punching Bag (album) =

Studio album by Josh Turner
- Released: June 12, 2012
- Studio: Ocean Way Nashville, The Pool House and Quad Studios (Nashville, Tennessee); Ardent Studios (Memphis, Tennessee)
- Genre: Country; neotraditional country
- Length: 40:54
- Label: MCA Nashville
- Producer: Frank Rogers

Josh Turner chronology
Icon (2011)	Punching Bag (2012)	Deep South (2017)

Singles from Punching Bag
- 1. "Time Is Love" Released: January 9, 2012; 2. "Find Me a Baby" Released: October 15, 2012

Professional ratings
Review scores
Source	Rating
Allmusic	2.5/5 stars
Taste of Country	3/5 stars

Punching Bag is the fifth studio album by American country music artist Josh Turner. It was released on June 12, 2012, by MCA Nashville. Turner co-wrote eight of the album's eleven tracks. The album includes the singles "Time Is Love" and "Find Me a Baby."

The album debuted at No. 4 on Billboard 200, and No. 1 on the Top Country Albums chart, selling 45,000 copies in its first week. It has sold 209,000 copies in the United States as of March 2015.

== Track listing ==
No.	Title	Writer(s)	Length
1.	"Introduction" (by Michael Buffer)		0:36
2.	"Punching Bag"	Josh Turner; Pat McLaughlin	3:39
3.	"Time Is Love"	Tony Martin; Mark Nesler; Tom Shapiro	3:21
4.	"Deeper Than My Love"	Lee Thomas Miller; Chris Stapleton	3:17
5.	"Good Problem"	Turner; Mark Narmore	3:08
6.	"Cold Shoulder"	Turner; Narmore	3:59
7.	"Find Me a Baby"	Turner; Frank Rogers	3:38
8.	"Whatcha Reckon"	Turner; Ben Hayslip	3:24
9.	"Pallbearer" (featuring Iris DeMent & Marty Stuart)	Turner	4:34
10.	"For the Love of God" (featuring Ricky Skaggs)	Turner	4:07
11.	"I Was There"	Monty Criswell; Tim Mensy	3:54
12.	"Left Hand Man"	Turner; Hayslip	3:17
Total length:			40:54

== Personnel ==
- Josh Turner – lead vocals
- Gordon Mote – Wurlitzer electric piano (1–9, 11, 12), Hammond B3 organ (1–9, 11, 12)
- Bryan Sutton – acoustic guitars, banjo
- J.T. Corenflos – electric guitars (1–9, 11, 12), baritone guitar (9)
- Steve Hinson – steel guitar (1–9, 11, 12)
- Frank Rogers – baritone guitar (5, 7, 11)
- Marty Stuart – mandolin (9)
- Ricky Skaggs – mandolin (10), cello (10), harmony vocals (10)
- Kevin "Swine" Grantt – bass guitar, upright bass, tic-tac bass
- Shannon Forrest – drums
- Eric Darken – percussion
- Aubrey Haynie – fiddle
- Michael Buffer – introduction (1)
- Wes Hightower – backing vocals (1–8, 10–12)
- Russell Terrell – backing vocals (1–8, 10–12)
- Colby Turner – backing vocals (7)
- Hampton Turner – backing vocals (7)
- Jennifer Turner –backing vocals (7)
- Marion Turner – backing vocals (7)
- Iris DeMent – harmony vocals (9)

=== Production ===
- Brian Wright – A&R
- Frank Rogers – producer
- Richard Barrow – recording, overdub recording
- Neal Cappellino – overdub recording
- Ben Terry – recording assistant
- Mike Wilson – additional recording
- Justin Niebank – mixing at Blackbird Studios (Nashville, Tennessee)
- Drew Bollman – mix assistant
- Seth Morton – mix assistant
- Brady Barnett – digital editing
- Jon Craig – digital editing
- Tyler Moles – digital editing
- Brian David Willis – digital editing
- Hank Williams – mastering at MasterMix (Nashville, Tennessee)
- Phillip Stein – production assistant
- Craig Allen – art direction, design
- Renee Behrman – art direction
- Josh Turner – art direction
- George Holz – photography
- Trish Townsend – wardrobe stylist
- Paula Turner – hair, make-up
- Ted Greene – management

== Chart performance ==
=== Album ===
Chart (2012)	Peak position
US Billboard 200	4
US Billboard Top Country Albums	1

=== Album year-end charts ===
Chart (2012)	Position
US Billboard 200	191
US Top Country Albums (Billboard)	36
