= Lay Low (Josh Turner song) =

Single by Josh Turner

from the album Deep South
- Released: September 15, 2014
- Recorded: 2014
- Genre: Country
- Length: 4:21 (album version); 4:03 (radio edit)
- Label: MCA Nashville
- Songwriters: Tony Martin; Mark Nesler; Ross Copperman
- Producer: Frank Rogers

Josh Turner singles chronology
"Find Me a Baby" (2012)	"Lay Low" (2014)	"Hometown Girl" (2016)

"Lay Low" is a song written by Ross Copperman, Tony Martin and Mark Nesler, and recorded by American country music artist Josh Turner. It was released in September 2014 as the lead-off single from Turner's sixth studio album Deep South, which was released three years later in 2017.

== Content ==
"Lay Low" is a ballad in which the narrator praises the simple things that make life worthwhile, longing for a simple place of peace and quiet.

== Critical reception ==
Taste of Country's Carrie Horton awarded the song with the "Taste of Country Critic's Pick" saying that "with honest lyrics and a perfectly straightforward melody, ‘Lay Low’ touches on all the things that make fans love country music".

== Music video ==
The music video was directed by Trey Fanjoy and premiered in November 2014.

== Chart performance ==
The song has sold 116,000 copies in the US as of April 2015.

Chart (2014–2015)	Peak position
Canada Country (Billboard)	49
US Bubbling Under Hot 100 (Billboard)	20
US Country Airplay (Billboard)	25
US Hot Country Songs (Billboard)	28

=== Year-end charts ===
Chart (2015)	Position
US Country Airplay (Billboard)	88
US Hot Country Songs (Billboard)	87

== Certifications ==
Region	Certification	Certified units/sales
United States (RIAA)	Gold	500,000^{‡}
^{‡} Sales+streaming figures based on certification alone.
