= I Wouldn't Be a Man =

1987 single by Don Williams

Single by Don Williams

from the album Traces
- B-side: "The Light in Your Eyes"
- Released: October 1987
- Genre: Country
- Length: 3:21
- Label: Capitol Nashville
- Songwriter: Mike Reid; Rory Bourke
- Producers: Don Williams; Garth Fundis

Don Williams singles chronology
"I'll Never Be in Love Again" (1987)	"I Wouldn't Be a Man" (1987)	"Another Place, Another Time" (1988)

"I Wouldn't Be a Man" is a song written by Mike Reid and Rory Bourke. Originally recorded by Don Williams, it has also been covered by Billy Dean and Josh Turner. Williams's version of the song was a Top Ten country hit in late 1987–early 1988, while versions by Dean and Turner also charted.

== Don Williams version ==
Williams' version of the song appears on his 1987 album Traces for Capitol Records. It was released as a single in October of that year and his version peaked at number nine on the Hot Country Singles (now Hot Country Songs) charts published by Billboard, and number seven on the Canadian country music charts published by RPM.

=== Chart positions ===
Chart (1987–1988)	Peak position
US Hot Country Songs (Billboard)	9
Canadian RPM Country Tracks	7

== Billy Dean version ==
"I Wouldn't Be a Man"

Single by Billy Dean

from the album It's What I Do
- Released: October 21, 1996
- Genre: Country
- Length: 4:24
- Label: Capitol
- Songwriters: Mike Reid; Rory Bourke
- Producers: Tom Shapiro; Nancy H. Williams

Billy Dean singles chronology
"That Girl's Been Spyin' on Me" (1996)	"I Wouldn't Be a Man" (1996)	"In the Name of Love" (1997)

Billy Dean recorded the song for his 1996 album It's What I Do, also released through Capitol Records. His version of the song was the third single from it, spending fourteen weeks on the country charts and peaking at number 45 by January 1997.

=== Background ===
In October 1996, Dean told Billboard magazine that he chose to cut the song because he thought that it was different from the material that he had cut before; he called it a "one-on-one, man-to-woman song". He recorded the vocals in one take. He also said that he had heard Mike Reid, the original co-writer, sing it and it "knocked [him] out". Richard Murray directed the video for Dean's version.

=== Critical reception ===
Deborah Evans Price, of Billboard magazine reviewed the song favorably, saying that the tune boasts a "romantic lyric and wistful melody." She goes on to call Dean's rendition "bluesier" than Williams' "straight-ahead country cut." She says that while it is impossible to top Williams' original "sensitive rendering", Dean manages to do a "more-than-adequate job" of bringing the song back to life.

=== Music video ===
The music video was directed by Richard Murray and premiered in late 1996.

=== Chart positions ===
"I Wouldn't Be a Man" debuted at number 69 on the U.S. Billboard Hot Country Singles & Tracks for the week of November 2, 1996.

Chart (1996–1997)	Peak position
Canada Country Singles (RPM)	32
US Hot Country Songs (Billboard)	45

== Josh Turner version ==
"I Wouldn't Be a Man"

Single by Josh Turner

from the album Haywire
- Released: October 25, 2010
- Genre: Country
- Length: 3:32
- Label: MCA Nashville
- Songwriters: Mike Reid; Rory Bourke
- Producer: Frank Rogers

Josh Turner singles chronology
"All Over Me" (2010)	"I Wouldn't Be a Man" (2010)	"Time Is Love" (2012)

In late September 2010, Universal Music Group Nashville announced that Josh Turner's version of the song would be the third single from his album Haywire. He began filming the music video for it on September 27, 2010, under the direction of Peter Zavadil. The song debuted at number 56 on the U.S. Billboard Hot Country Songs chart the week of November 13, 2010.

=== Critical reception ===
Juli Thanki of Engine 145 thought that Turner's rendition of the song sounded like he was "phoning it in". Bobby Peacock of Roughstock rated it 4 stars out of 5, saying that Turner "finds the right balance of emotions". He also thought that it was better than both Williams' and Dean's versions.

=== Music video ===
The music video was directed by Peter Zavadil and premiered in late 2010.

=== Chart positions ===
Chart (2010–2011)	Peak position
US Hot Country Songs (Billboard)	18
US Billboard Hot 100	92

=== Year-end charts ===
Chart (2011)	Position
US Country Songs (Billboard)	67

=== Certifications ===
Region	Certification	Certified units/sales
United States (RIAA)	Gold	500,000^{‡}
^{‡} Sales+streaming figures based on certification alone.
