= Shannon Forrest =

American drummer (born 1973)

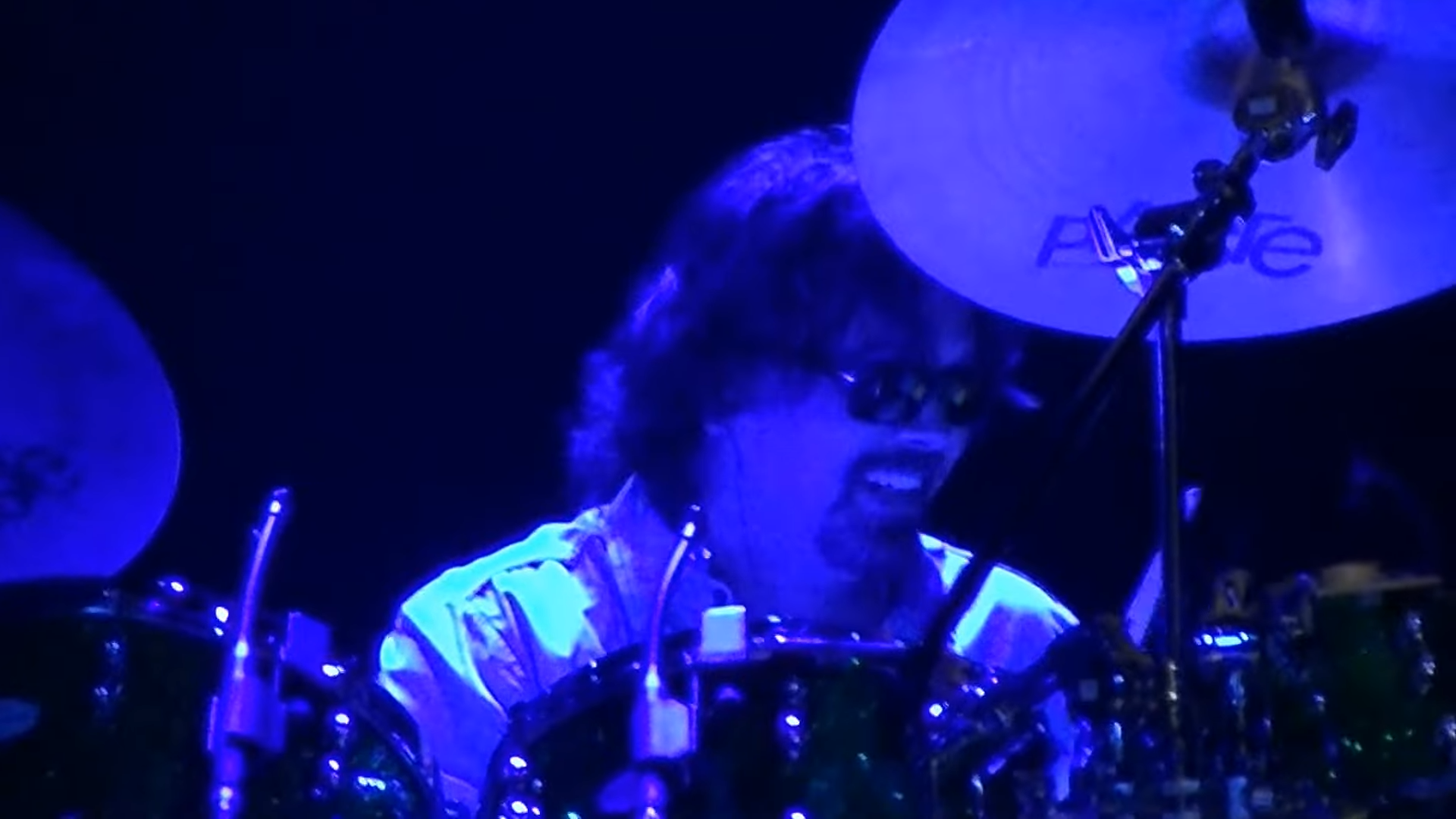
- Forrest with Toto in 2017.

Background information
- Born: Shannon Otis Forrest; August 22, 1973 (age 53); Easley, South Carolina, U.S.
- Genres: Rock; country; jazz fusion
- Occupation: Musician
- Instruments: Drums; percussion
- Formerly of: Toto, The Dukes of September

Shannon Otis Forrest (born August 22, 1973) is an American drummer and percussionist known primarily for his session work. As a session drummer, he has contributed to the work of many well-known artists, and he is also a producer and engineer. Additionally, he served as touring drummer of Toto from 2014 to 2019, and again from 2024 to 2026.

== Biography ==
=== Session work ===
Forrest began his career working with his father Otis Forrest at The Sounding Board Studio in Easley, SC. There he recorded many projects with traditional southern Gospel and local country artists. He moved on to work as a Nashville session musician, where Forrest has been involved in the recording of successful albums by Brooks & Dunn, Taylor Swift, Rascal Flatts, Carrie Underwood, Mary Chapin Carpenter, The Chieftains, Willie Nelson, Ricky Skaggs, Trisha Yearwood, Lee Ann Womack, Jerry Douglas, Merle Haggard, Tim McGraw, Josh Turner, Toby Keith, Alabama, Montgomery Gentry, Kenny Rogers, Michael McDonald and many others.

=== Toto ===
Forrest has been a touring musician with Toto since 2014, taking the place of Keith Carlock. Forrest performed earlier with Toto in 2009, sitting in for Simon Phillips, when they were inducted into the Musicians Hall of Fame and Museum in Nashville and he cites Jeff Porcaro and Lenny Castro as his biggest influences. After disbanding in 2019, Toto returned in 2020 with a new lineup which didn't include Forrest. However, it was announced on the band’s Facebook page that he and keyboardist Greg Phillinganes were returning ahead of the 2024 tour.. On May 5, 2026 after the first leg of the 2026 Toto tour Forrest announced that he would leave Toto and a day later Keith Carlock was announced as his replacement.

=== Dukes of September ===
From 2010 to 2012, Forrest played with Boz Scaggs, Michael McDonald, and Donald Fagen on their Dukes of September tours.

=== Equipment ===
Forrest currently plays Pearl Drums, Paiste Cymbals, Remo Drumheads, and Innovative Percussion. Previously, he was the sole exclusive artist for the Brady Drum Company. For his work with Toto, Forrest used a Brady Jarrah Ply drum kit with a red sparkle finish, which was mounted on a Pearl Icon rack.

Forrest also plays Gon Bops Mariano Congas, Mariano bongos, and Mariano Djembes.

=== Awards ===
- Academy of Country Music Award for Drummer of the Year (seven times)

== Discography ==
This section presents a partial list of albums to which Forrest has contributed.

=== 1994–99 ===
- 1994: The Arnolds – Read Between the Nails (Cherish Music)
- 1994: The Freemans – In a High Wind (Goldenvine)
- 1996: Jeff Foxworthy – Crank It Up: The Music Album (Warner Bros.)
- 1997: The Kinleys – Just Between You and Me (Epic)
- 1997: Ricky Skaggs – Life is a Journey (Atlantic Records)
- 1997: Sheri Easter – Sheri (Spring Hill)
- 1997: The Bishops – Reach The World (Homeland)
- 1997: John Hager – October Road (PWD/Huge)
- 1997: Matt King – Five O'Clock Hero (Atlantic)
- 1998: Martina McBride – White Christmas (RCA)
- 1998: The Wilkinsons – Nothing but Love (Giant)
- 1998: Don Williams – I Turn the Page (Giant)
- 1999: Jennifer Day – The Fun of Your Love (BNA)

=== 2000–04 ===
- 2000: Alabama – When It All Goes South (RCA)
- 2000: Steph Carse – Steph Carse (H2E)
- 2000: Ricky Skaggs and Friends – Big Mon: The Songs of Bill Monroe (Skaggs Family)
- 2000: The Kinleys – II (Epic)
- 2000: Kenny Rogers – There You Go Again (Dreamcatcher)
- 2001: Jim Brickman – Simple Things (Windham Hill)
- 2001: Brooks & Dunn – Steers & Stripes (Arista Nashville)
- 2001: Chris Cagle – Play It Loud (Capitol)
- 2001: Wanessa Camargo – Wanessa Camargo (BMG Brasil)
- 2002: Bonnie Bramlett – I'm Still The Same (Koch Records)
- 2002: Art Garfunkel with Maia Sharp and Buddy Mondlock – Everything Waits to be Noticed (Manhattan)
- 2002: Toby Keith – Unleashed (DreamWorks)
- 2002: Shana Morrison – 7 Wishes (Vanguard)
- 2002: Joe Nichols – Man with a Memory (Universal South)
- 2003: Josh Turner – Long Black Train (MCA Nashville)
- 2004: Maura O'Connell – Don't I Know (Sugar Hill)
- 2004: Mindy Smith – One Moment More (Vanguard)
- 2004: Montgomery Gentry – You Do Your Thing (Columbia)
- 2004: Phil Vassar – Shaken Not Stirred (Arista Nashville)

=== 2005–09 ===
- 2005: Faith Hill – Fireflies (Warner Bros.)
- 2005: Carrie Underwood – Some Hearts (Arista Nashville)
- 2005: Trisha Yearwood – Jasper County (MCA Nashville)
- 2006: Brooks & Dunn – Hillbilly Deluxe (Arista Nashville)
- 2006: Matt Dusk – Back in Town (Decca)
- 2006: Toby Keith – White Trash with Money (Show Dog Nashville)
- 2006: Kenny Rogers – Water & Bridges (Capitol Nashville)
- 2006: Josh Turner – Your Man (MCA Nashville)
- 2007: Joe Nichols – Real Things (Universal South)
- 2007: Josh Turner – Everything Is Fine (MCA Nashville) – banjo, resonator guitar, acoustic guitar
- 2008: Trace Adkins – X (Ten) (Capitol Nashville)
- 2008: Jessica Simpson – Do You Know (Epic)
- 2009: Reba McEntire – Keep on Loving You (Valory)

=== 2010–present ===
- 2010: Taylor Swift – Speak Now (Big Machine Records)
- 2010: Josh Turner – Haywire (MCA Nashville)
- 2012: Jana Kramer – Jana Kramer (Elektra Nashville)
- 2012: Josh Turner– Punching Bag (MCA Nashville)
- 2014: Tim McGraw – Sundown Heaven Town (Big Machine)
- 2014: Josh Thompson - Turn it Up (Show Dog)
- 2015: Don Henley – Cass County (Capitol)
- 2017: Josh Turner – Deep South (MCA Nashville)
- 2017: Michael McDonald – Wide Open (Chonin-BMG)
- 2018: Toto – Old Is New (Columbia)
- 2019: Toto – 40 Tours Around the Sun (Eagle)
