= Everything Is Fine (song) =

Single by Josh Turner

from the album Everything Is Fine
- Released: August 25, 2008
- Genre: Country
- Length: 3:35
- Label: MCA Nashville
- Songwriter: Josh Turner
- Producer: Frank Rogers

Josh Turner singles chronology
"Another Try" (2008)	"Everything Is Fine" (2008)	"Why Don't We Just Dance" (2009)

"Everything Is Fine" is a song written and recorded by American country music artist Josh Turner. It was released in August 2008 as the third single and title track from his album Everything Is Fine.

== Content ==
"Everything Is Fine" is a mid-tempo in which the narrator lists off the various occurrences in and observations of his everyday life, such as his house, job, and family. He expresses a sense of satisfaction with his life in general, saying that he's "feeling good and everything is fine."

== Critical reception ==
The song received a "thumbs up" rating from the country music site Engine 145. Reviewer Matt C. says that it is "much easier to sing about being country when the song actually sounds country."

== Music video ==
The music video was directed by Roman White and premiered in November 2008.

== Chart performance ==
The song debuted at number 52 on the U.S. Billboard Hot Country Songs chart for the week of September 6, 2008.

Chart (2008–2009)	Peak position
US Hot Country Songs (Billboard)	20
US Billboard Bubbling Under Hot 100	20
