= Firecracker (song) =

Single by Josh Turner

from the album Everything Is Fine
- Released: June 25, 2007
- Genre: Country
- Length: 3:30
- Label: MCA Nashville
- Songwriters: Shawn Camp; Pat McLaughlin; Josh Turner
- Producer: Frank Rogers

Josh Turner singles chronology
"Me and God" (2006)	"Firecracker" (2007)	"Another Try" (2008)

"Firecracker" is a song co-written and recorded by American country music artist Josh Turner. It was released in June 2007 as the lead-off single from Turner's third studio album Everything Is Fine, which was released on October 30, 2007, by MCA Nashville. His fastest-climbing single, the song reached a peak of number 2 on the Billboard Hot Country Songs charts. Turner wrote this song with Shawn Camp and Pat McLaughlin.

== Content ==
The song is an up-tempo number in which the narrator describes the intensity of his lover as being comparable to the explosion of a firecracker.

== Music video ==
A music video was released to promote the single, directed by Peter Zavadil. In the video, Josh Turner is seen pulling up to a fireworks outlet. While he is inside shopping, mixed in are scenes of a young man, flirting with the girl at the counter, played by Miss Kentucky Teen USA 2005, Sarah Bryan Withers. Turner is shown performing the song on an outdoor stage in parts of the video. The video is shot in Kimball, Tennessee, near Jasper and South Pittsburg.

== Chart performance ==
"Firecracker" debuted at #58 on the U.S. Billboard Hot Country Songs for the week of July 14, 2007. In its 24th week on the chart, the song jumped from #4 to #2 on the chart, being held from the top spot by Taylor Swift's "Our Song", which leapfrogged "Firecracker" when the former leaped from #6 to #1. The song held the position for two weeks. It was later ranked at #53 on the year-end chart.

Chart (2007)	Peak position
Canada Hot 100 (Billboard)	78
US Billboard Hot 100	50
US Hot Country Songs (Billboard)	2

=== Year-end charts ===
Chart (2007)	Position
US Country Songs (Billboard)	53

== Certifications ==
Region	Certification	Certified units/sales
United States (RIAA)	Platinum	1,000,000^{‡}
^{‡} Sales+streaming figures based on certification alone.
