= All Over Me (Josh Turner song) =

Single by Josh Turner

from the album Haywire
- Released: April 5, 2010
- Recorded: 2009
- Genre: Country
- Length: 3:19
- Label: MCA Nashville
- Songwriters: Rhett Akins; Dallas Davidson; Ben Hayslip
- Producer: Frank Rogers

Josh Turner singles chronology
"Why Don't We Just Dance" (2009)	"All Over Me" (2010)	"I Wouldn't Be a Man" (2010)

"All Over Me" is a song written by Rhett Akins, Dallas Davidson and Ben Hayslip, and recorded by American country music artist Josh Turner. It was released in April 2010 as the second single from his album Haywire.

== Background and writing ==
Co-writer Rhett Akins told The Boot that the song "is another one of those good time summer feeling songs about hot weather and it being time to get in the boat, grab your girl and head to the lake or the river." He also said that they "didn't have any title mapped out or even a direction of where we were going[…]We came up with the title to the song as we were writing the chorus about save all your kisses up, bring all your sweet love, and pour it all over me."

== Content ==
"All Over Me" is an uptempo song backed primarily by piano and electric guitar. The song's male narrator describes telling his love interest his desire to take her down to the riverbank in the summer, begging her to pour her love "all over [him]."

== Critical reception ==
The song has been well received by music critics. Karlie Justus gave the song a thumbs up, favoring it as a summer tune that "bring[s] the froth and fun these [types of] songs require without completely succumbing to tired instrumental and lyrical clichés." She found the lyrics "simple [and] frustratingly derivative," but complimented Turner's "signature baritone." Bobby Peacock of Roughstock spoke positively of the song, referring to it as a "safe song" that has been done before, but it seems "fun when Josh sings about it." Kevin John Coyne of Country Universe gave the song a B rating, referring to it as an "enjoyable listen" and that Turner is able to "elevate good material to great entertainment."

== Chart performance ==
"All Over Me" debuted at No. 59 on the U.S. Billboard Hot Country Songs chart for the week of April 24, 2010. It debuted at No. 97 on the U.S. Billboard Hot 100 chart for the week of July 17, 2010. The song reached No. 1 on the country charts in October 2010.

Chart (2010)	Peak position
US Billboard Hot 100	59
US Hot Country Songs (Billboard)	1

=== Year-end charts ===
Chart (2010)	Position
US Country Songs (Billboard)	4

== Certifications ==
Region	Certification	Certified units/sales
United States (RIAA)	Gold	500,000^{‡}
^{‡} Sales+streaming figures based on certification alone.
