= Another Try =

Single by Josh Turner featuring Trisha Yearwood

from the album Everything Is Fine
- Released: January 7, 2008
- Recorded: 2007
- Genre: Country
- Length: 3:46
- Label: MCA Nashville
- Songwriters: Chris Stapleton; Jeremy Spillman
- Producer: Frank Rogers

Josh Turner singles chronology
"Firecracker" (2007)	"Another Try" (2008)	"Everything Is Fine" (2008)

Trisha Yearwood singles chronology
"Heaven, Heartache and the Power of Love" (2007)	"Another Try" (2008)	"This Is Me You're Talking To" (2008)

"Another Try" is a song written by Jeremy Spillman and Chris Stapleton, and recorded by American country music artist Josh Turner, featuring harmony vocals from Trisha Yearwood. It was released in January 2008 as the second single from Turner's album Everything Is Fine, and his eighth chart single overall. In addition, it is Yearwood's 37th single.

== Content ==
"Another Try" is a ballad in which the narrator expresses his desire to undo his past actions in order to bring back a former lover who has left him. He begins by listing the mistakes that he has made, such as hiding his emotions ("all the things I felt and never shared") and "let[ting] her go without a fight". In the chorus, he elaborates on the central point by stating that, given the opportunity to reverse his mistakes, he would never let his lover go again.

== Music video ==
A music video for the song was released in April 2008. Directed by Stephen Scott, the video alternates between two sets of footage. The first features Turner singing and playing acoustic guitar by himself in a room. The other set portrays a scene in which Turner, after discovering that his lover has left, drives off with a suitcase full of belongings, which he throws off a high bridge. This latter set of footage was filmed backwards (thus, the bridge scene comes first), illustrating the central character's desire to reverse time. Yearwood does not appear in the video. Scenes from the video were filmed in Franklin, Tennessee, primarily in the town's square.

== Critical reception ==
The song received a "thumbs down" review from the country music site Engine 145. Reviewer Ben Cisneros thought that the production was "far too contrived", also saying that he did not consider the song suitable for a duet. His review praised Turner's and Yearwood's voices as well as the "pleasant, mysterious" first verse, but thought that the second verse failed to expand the concept of the first. Allmusic critic Thom Jurek described the song favorably in his review of Everything Is Fine, calling it a "moving duet" and saying that "Yearwood…adds exponentially to this song emotionally and texturally."

The song received a nomination for Vocal Event of the Year at the 44th Annual Academy of Country Music awards.

== Chart performance ==
The song debuted at number 57 on the Billboard Hot Country Songs chart dated January 12, 2008.

Chart (2008)	Peak position
US Billboard Hot 100	96
US Hot Country Songs (Billboard)	15

=== Year-end charts ===
Chart (2008)	Position
US Country Songs (Billboard)	56
