= Time Is Love =

Single by Josh Turner

from the album Punching Bag
- Released: January 9, 2012
- Recorded: 2011
- Genre: Country
- Length: 3:21
- Label: MCA Nashville
- Songwriters: Tony Martin; Mark Nesler; Tom Shapiro
- Producer: Frank Rogers

Josh Turner singles chronology
"I Wouldn't Be a Man" (2010)	"Time Is Love" (2012)	"Find Me a Baby" (2012)

"Time Is Love" is a song written by Tony Martin, Mark Nesler and Tom Shapiro and recorded by American country music artist Josh Turner. It was released in January 2012 as the lead-off single from Turner's album Punching Bag. It was covered by Mark Kozelek on his 2013 covers album Like Rats.

== Content ==
"Time Is Love" is a moderate up-tempo song with prominent mandolin. The song's male narrator describes being at work and expressing the urgency that his time would be much better spent at home with his woman, because "time is love." The song is in the key of D major with a main chord pattern of Bm-G-A-D.

== Critical reception ==
"Time Is Love" received mostly average reviews from critics. Billy Dukes with Taste of Country gave the song a 2½ stars out of 5, faulting the lyrics for being bland; however, he complimented Turner's voice and the "brilliant instrumental bridge." Kevin John Coyne of Country Universe gave the song a C rating, saying that the vocal delivery lacks Turner's signature baritone. Matt Bjorke of Roughstock gave the song 3 stars out of 5, saying that it "feels like it’s more of a ‘background’ kind of song more than one that makes you wanna stand up and notice it;" he complimented the song's production as a happy marriage of modern country and Turner's neotraditionalist roots. Greg Victor, music critic at Parcbench.com gave the song 3 stars out of 4, citing the song's "jazz-inflected improvisatory feel" and appreciating the way that Josh Turner delivered "a more modern sound echoing a traditional sentiment."

== Music video ==
The music video was directed by Peter Zavadil and premiered in March 2012.

== Chart performance ==
"Time Is Love" debuted at number 56 on the U.S. Billboard Hot Country Songs chart for the week of January 14, 2012. It also debuted at number 91 on the U.S. Billboard Hot 100 chart for the week of April 14, 2012.

In December 2012, Billboard magazine named "Time is Love" the No. 1 country song of the year despite it never placing at No. 1 on the Hot Country Songs chart; it peaked at number 2 behind Little Big Town's "Pontoon" and Hunter Hayes' "Wanted". In the process, the song became the second in the 68-year-old chart's history to achieve this distinction, behind Lee Brice's "Love Like Crazy", which peaked at number 3 in 2010.

== Charts ==
=== Weekly charts ===
Chart (2012)	Peak position
Canada Hot 100 (Billboard)	92
US Billboard Hot 100	44
US Hot Country Songs (Billboard)	2

=== Year-end charts ===
Chart (2012)	Position
US Country Songs (Billboard)	1

== Certifications ==
Region	Certification	Certified units/sales
United States (RIAA)	Platinum	1,000,000^{‡}
^{‡} Sales+streaming figures based on certification alone.
