= Deep South (Josh Turner album) =

Studio album by Josh Turner
- Released: March 10, 2017
- Studios: Ocean Way Nashville, Ken's Gold Club, House of Blues Studios, The Pool House and Sound Emporium Studios (Nashville, Tennessee); New Hope/Dream Studios (Honolulu, Oahu, Hawaii)
- Genre: Neotraditional country
- Length: 41:39
- Label: MCA Nashville
- Producers: Frank Rogers; Kenny Greenberg

Josh Turner chronology
| Punching Bag (2012) | Deep South (2017) | I Serve a Savior (2018) |

Singles from Deep South
- 1. "Lay Low" Released: September 15, 2014; 2. "Hometown Girl" Released: May 31, 2016; 3. "All About You" Released: May 15, 2017

Deep South is the sixth studio album by American country music artist Josh Turner. It was released on March 10, 2017, through MCA Nashville. The album's lead single, "Lay Low", was released to radio on September 15, 2014, and reached number 25 on the Country Airplay chart. The second single, "Hometown Girl", was released to radio on May 31, 2016. The single peaked at No. 2 on Billboard's Country Airplay Chart and No. 1 on Mediabase, making it Turner's fifth No. 1 single. The third single, "All About You" was released to radio on May 15, 2017. It is Turner's first release since 2012's Punching Bag.

== Critical reception ==
AllMusic reviewer Stephen Thomas Erlewine wrote that "Turner doesn't attempt to chase trends, choosing instead to lean into his knack for supple balladry and then build a mature modern country around that sound."

Sounds Like Nashville gave the album a positive review, writing: "With his sixth studio album, Josh Turner delivers a project that should serve as the perfect soundtrack for those perfect spring days".

== Commercial performance ==
The album debuted at No. 18 on the Billboard 200, and No. 1 on the Hot Country Albums chart, with 18,000 copies in pure sales and 21,000 units when tracks and streams are included. The album has sold 61,700 copies in the US as of December 2017.

== Track listing ==
| No. | Title | Writer(s) | Length |
|---|---|---|---|
| 1. | "Deep South" | Josh Turner | 3:56 |
| 2. | "All About You" | Craig Wiseman, Justin Weaver | 3:30 |
| 3. | "Hometown Girl" | Marc Beeson, Daniel Tashian | 3:35 |
| 4. | "Beach Bums" | Turner | 3:52 |
| 5. | "Southern Drawl" | Andrew Dorff, Jonathan Singleton | 3:44 |
| 6. | "Where the Girls Are" | Al Anderson, Ben Daniel, Brandon Kinney | 3:12 |
| 7. | "Never Had a Reason" | Justin Ebach, Steven Dale Jones, Brad Tursi | 4:03 |
| 8. | "Wonder" | Turner, Mark Narmore | 4:30 |
| 9. | "One Like Mine" | Ben Hayslip, David Lee Murphy | 3:17 |
| 10. | "Lay Low" | Tony Martin, Mark Nesler, Ross Copperman | 4:22 |
| 11. | "Hawaiian Girl (feat. Ho'okena)" | Turner | 3:38 |

== Personnel ==
Credits adapted from AllMusic

- Josh Turner – lead vocals
- Gordon Mote – acoustic piano, keyboards, synthesizers, Hammond B3 organ
- Dave Cohen – synthesizers (2, 3, 5)
- David Huff – programming (2, 3, 5)
- J.T. Corenflos – electric guitars (1, 4, 6–11)
- Frank Rogers – electric guitars (1, 4, 6–11)
- Bryan Sutton – acoustic guitars (1, 4, 6–11)
- Ilya Toshinsky – acoustic guitars (1, 4, 6–11)
- Kenny Greenberg – electric guitars (2, 3, 5)
- Danny Rader – acoustic guitars (2, 3, 5), banjo (2, 3, 5), resonator guitar (2, 3, 5)
- Russ Pahl – slide guitar (2, 3, 5), mandolin (2, 3, 5), pedal steel guitar (2, 3, 5), Jew's harp (2, 3, 5)
- Steve Hinson – pedal steel guitar (1, 4, 6–11)
- Horace Dudoit – ukulele (11), backing vocals (11)
- Kevin "Swine" Grantt – bass (1, 4, 6–11)
- David LaBruyere – bass (2, 3, 5)
- Shannon Forrest – drums (1, 4, 6–11)
- Chad Cromwell – drums (2, 3, 5)
- Eric Darken – percussion (1, 4, 6–11)
- Aubrey Haynie – fiddle (1, 4, 6–11), mandobass (1, 4, 6–11)
- Wes Hightower – backing vocals (1, 4, 6–11)
- Russell Terrell – backing vocals (1, 4, 6–11)
- Perry Coleman – harmony vocals (2, 3, 5)
- Tania Hancheroff – harmony vocals (2, 3, 5)
- Chris Kamaka – backing vocals (11)
- Glen Smith – backing vocals (11)

=== Production ===
- Brian Wright – A&R
- Frank Rogers – producer (1, 4, 6–11)
- Kenny Greenberg – producer (2, 3, 5), additional production (6)
- Ted Greene – additional production (9), management
- Richard Barrow – recording (1, 4, 6–11), additional recording (1, 4, 6–11)
- Mills Logan – recording (2, 3, 5), additional recording (2, 3, 5)
- Jasper LeMaster – recording assistant (1, 4, 6–11)
- Josh Ditty – recording assistant (2, 3, 5)
- Jeff Weinkauf – additional recording (1, 4, 6–11)
- Samuel Franey – additional recording assistant (2, 3, 5)
- Zack Pancoast – additional recording assistant (2, 3, 5)
- Brian David Willis – digital editing
- Brady Barnett – digital editing (1, 4, 6–11)
- Matt Rausch – digital editing (1, 4, 6–11)
- Justin Niebank – mixing at Blackbird Studios and Starstruck Studios (Nashville, Tennessee)
- Drew Bollman – mix assistant
- Hank Williams – mastering at MasterMix (Nashville, Tennessee)
- Scott Johnson – production assistant (1, 4, 6–11)
- Paige Connors – production coordinator (2, 3, 5)
- Josh Turner – art direction
- Craig Allen – design
- David McClister – photography

== Charts ==
=== Album ===
==== Weekly charts ====
| Chart (2017) | Peak position |
|---|---|
| Canadian Albums (Billboard) | 95 |
| US Billboard 200 | 18 |
| US Top Country Albums (Billboard) | 1 |

==== Year-end charts ====
| Chart (2017) | Position |
|---|---|
| US Top Country Albums (Billboard) | 58 |
