= Long Black Train (song) =

Single by Josh Turner

from the album Long Black Train
- B-side: "Backwoods Boy"
- Released: May 19, 2003
- Genre: Country
- Length: 4:10 (album version)
- Label: MCA Nashville
- Songwriter(s): Josh Turner
- Producer(s): Mark Wright, Frank Rogers

Josh Turner singles chronology
"She'll Go on You" (2002)	"Long Black Train" (2003)	"What It Ain't" (2004)

"Long Black Train" is a song written and recorded by American country music singer Josh Turner. It was released in May 2003 as the second single and title track from his debut album of the same name. Having spent more than 30 weeks on the Billboard country charts, "Long Black Train" reached a peak of #13 in early 2004. On April 23, 2018, it was certified as two-times Platinum by the RIAA.

== Content ==
"Long Black Train" is a mid-tempo song featuring acoustic guitar, fills from pedabro and fiddle, and a percussive rhythm reminiscent of a steam locomotive in motion. Using a funeral train as a metaphor, the lyrics tell of resisting temptation from the Devil.

Turner told The Boot that the song was inspired by a vision that he had of a long, black train running down a track in the middle of nowhere. Turner said, "I could see people standing out to the sides of this track watching this train go by. As I was walking, experiencing this vision, I kept asking myself, 'What does this vision mean and what is this train?' It dawned on me that this train was a physical metaphor for temptation. These people are caught up in the decision of whether or not to go on this train".

== Critical reception ==
Steve Leggett of Allmusic said of the song, "sung in Turner's deep voice, it rolls across country radio like nothing else on the scene, the ominous breath of hellfire in the lyrics conjuring up the ghost of Johnny Cash." Hank Kalet of PopMatters also described the song favorably: "It is a proudly religious song, almost fiery, defiant."

== Music video ==
The music video for this song was directed by Steven Goldmann and shot at the Tennessee Valley Railroad Museum in a few different locations along a railroad track. The various shots of Turner include him walking through a tunnel, standing on the tracks singing, and from above while he is playing guitar. The video features various characters, all of whom are participating in various sinful activities (including binge drinking, gambling, drug abuse and prostitution), and are shown on the train tracks as well. Some of the characters disappear when the train passes over them, indicating they gave in to sin, while the others remain on the tracks, indicating they were able to resist or repent.

The video also featured ex-Army Class 2-8-0 Consolidation #610 as the locomotive pulling the train. The loco was taken down for an FRA inspection in 2010, and has not yet been returned to excursion service.

== Personnel ==
- Eric Darken – percussion
- Shannon Forrest – drums
- Kevin "Swine" Grantt – upright bass
- Aubrey Haynie – fiddle
- Wes Hightower – backing vocals
- Mike Johnson – pedabro
- Steve Nathan – piano
- Brent Rowan – electric guitar
- Bryan Sutton – acoustic guitar, banjo
- Russell Terrell – backing vocals
- Josh Turner – lead vocals

== Chart performance ==
"Long Black Train" debuted at number 60 on the U.S. Billboard Hot Country Singles & Tracks for the week of May 31, 2003.

== Charts ==
=== Weekly charts ===
Chart (2003–2004)	Peak position
US Billboard Hot 100	72
US Hot Country Songs (Billboard)	13
US Country Airplay (Billboard)	13

Chart (2012)	Peak position
US Christian Digital Song Sales (Billboard)	14

=== Year-end charts ===
Chart (2004)	Peak position
US Country Songs (Billboard)	50

== Certifications ==
Region	Certification	Certified units/sales
United States (RIAA)	2× Platinum	2,000,000^{‡}
^{‡} Sales+streaming figures based on certification alone.
