= Pat McLaughlin =

American singer-songwriter

- Birth name: Patrick James McLaughlin
- Origin: Waterloo, Iowa, U.S.
- Genres: Country, blues, rock
- Occupation: Songwriter
- Instrument: Guitar
- Years active: 1980–present
- Website: www.patmclaughlin.com

Pat McLaughlin is an American singer-songwriter based in Nashville, Tennessee.

He was raised in Waterloo, Iowa, but moved to San Francisco, California, in the early 1970s. There McLaughlin began to write songs, playing alone at open mic nights and in the streets near the bay. After a brief stint in Boston, he moved to Nashville where he formed a band and released his first album in 1980. Two consecutive projects for Capitol Records followed. His first major label album Pat McLaughlin made its debut in 1988.

In the late 1980s, McLaughlin experienced his first mainstream country music success when Steve Wariner recorded McLaughlin's song "Lynda". Wariner's version climbed to the top of the charts, winning McLaughlin his first BMI Country Award in 1988. In 1992, Tanya Tucker and Delbert McClinton had a hit with McLaughlin's "Tell Me About It"—another BMI award resulted from this song. During his years in New Orleans, McLaughlin also released records produced by Jim Rooney (Hal Ketchum) and Ben Keith (Neil Young).

In 1997 along with former Subdudes members Tommy Malone and Johnny Ray Allen plus drummer Kenneth Blevins, McLaughlin formed Tiny Town. The quartet recorded one self-titled album, produced by Bernie Leadon in 1998. McLaughlin's compositions have been recorded by artists including Bonnie Raitt, Alan Jackson, Taj Mahal, Trisha Yearwood, Al Kooper, Nanci Griffith, Josh Turner, Gary Allan, Shawn Camp and Don Williams.

Gary Allan recorded McLaughlin's "Songs About Rain" in 2003, securing yet another BMI Country Award for McLaughlin. Allan's 2010 release, Get off the Pain, includes two McLaughlin co-writes: "I Think I've Had Enough" and "When You Give Yourself Away."

As a studio musician he has contributed guitar to projects by Jamie Hartford, Rosanne Cash, Julie Roberts, Don Williams, Al Kooper, Shawn Camp, Cowboy Jack Clement, Neil Diamond, Johnny Cash and many more.

In early 2010, he was featured on "Jammin' at Hippie Jacks," which airs on select public television stations across the U.S. He has also been performing with songwriters Shawn Camp and Al Anderson (formerly of NRBQ) in a band called The World Famous Headliners.

In November 2010, Pat McLaughlin appeared as an opening act for John Prine. "Summer's End," a song McLaughlin wrote with Prine, was The Americana Music Association 2019 Song of the Year. McLaughin also co-wrote Prine's final song with him before his death: "I Remember Everything", which won the 2021 AMA Song of the Year award and the Best American Roots Song.

== Discography ==
=== Albums ===
Year	Album	Label
1988	Pat McLaughlin	Capitol
1992	Party at Pat’s	Appaloosa
1994	Unglued	Dos
1995	Get Out and Stay Out	Dos
1996	Wind It On Up	Appaloosa
2000	Uncle Pat	Evangeline
2003	Next Five Miles	Creamstyle
2006	Horsefly	Creamstyle
2011	Live in 09	Creamstyle
2011	Live at the Coupe (DVD)	Creamstyle
