= Josh Turner =

American singer-songwriter (born 1977)

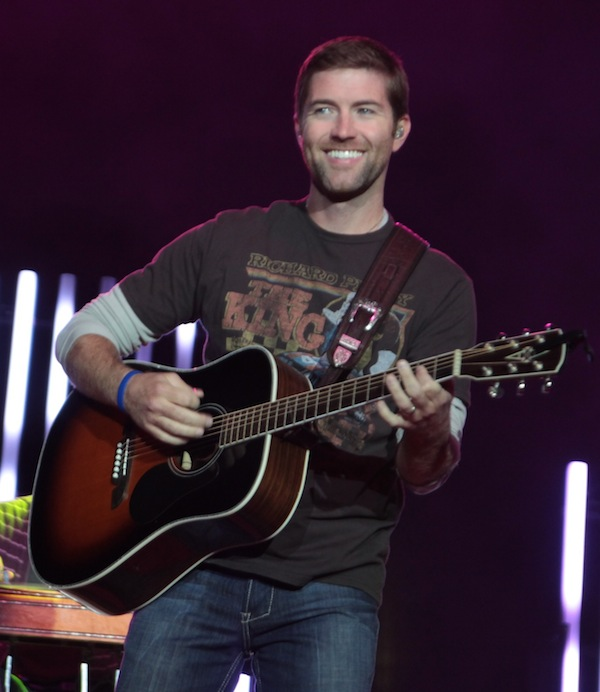
- Turner performing in 2010

Background information
- Born: Joshua Otis Turner; November 20, 1977 (age 48); Hannah, South Carolina, U.S.
- Origin: Hannah, South Carolina, U.S.
- Genres: Neotraditional country; bluegrass; gospel
- Instruments: Vocals, guitar
- Years active: 2001–present
- Label: MCA Nashville
- Spouse: Jennifer Ford (m. 2003)
- Website: joshturner.com
- Children: 4

Joshua Otis Turner (born November 20, 1977) is an American country singer and songwriter. In 2003, he signed to MCA Nashville Records. That same year, his debut album's title track, "Long Black Train", was his breakthrough single release. His second album, Your Man (2006) accounted for his first two No. 1 hits, "Your Man" and "Would You Go with Me", while 2007's Everything Is Fine included a No. 2 hit, "Firecracker". Haywire, released in 2010, produced his biggest hit, the four-week No. 1 hit "Why Don't We Just Dance" and another No. 1 song, "All Over Me". It was followed by Punching Bag (2012), whose lead-off single, "Time Is Love", was the biggest country hit of 2012 according to Billboard Year-End.

== Early life ==
Turner was born in Hannah, South Carolina. Growing up in the church, he founded a gospel quartet called Thankful Hearts, where he sang bass, in addition to singing the bass part in choirs.

In 1996, Turner developed a lesion on his right vocal cord. Turner was examined by the Vanderbilt voice clinic, where doctors advised him to let it heal on its own. Surgery was not needed, but he did have to rest his voice for a year. While Turner rested his voice back at home, he learned classical vocal technique and how to take care of his voice to avoid developing further problems. Turner states that he "learned how to whistle really well during that year". He included that skill in his song "Down In Georgia".

After Hannah-Pamplico High School, he spent some time at Francis Marion University before moving to Nashville, Tennessee, to enroll in Belmont University and pursue a career in music. After college, his fledgling career got a boost on December 21, 2001, during his debut on the Grand Ole Opry, when he performed a song he wrote titled "Long Black Train", which was inspired by Hank Williams. He received a standing ovation in the middle of the song, then sang it again as an encore.

== Career ==
=== 2001–2004: Long Black Train ===
On December 21, 2001, Turner debuted on the Grand Ole Opry with the song "Long Black Train".

In 2003, Turner released his debut album, also entitled Long Black Train. Prior to its release, Turner had released 7" vinyl singles of "She'll Go on You" and "Long Black Train". Both singles featured Long Black Train album track "Backwoods Boy" as a B-side. While neither "Backwoods Boy" nor "She'll Go on You" were successful (the latter peaking at No. 46 on the country charts), "Long Black Train" spent more than forty weeks on the Billboard country charts, reaching a peak of No. 13 and receiving a gold certification. The third single, "What It Ain't", was less successful, reaching No. 31.

=== 2005–2006: Your Man ===
In early 2006, Turner released his second album, Your Man. The album's first single and title track, "Your Man", was written by Jace Everett, Chris DuBois and Chris Stapleton and released in late 2005. "Your Man" also climbed the charts slowly, eventually reaching No. 1 in early 2006. Your Man was certified Gold by the RIAA four weeks after its release, and went Platinum six months later.

"Would You Go with Me" was the second single released from Your Man. Like charts, holding that position for two weeks; it also reached No. 48 on the Billboard Hot 100. Turner also performed it on the CMA Awards in November 2006.

Shortly after the album's release, a song called "Me and God" was released as a single to Christian radio. A duet with bluegrass musician Ralph Stanley, the song also featured members of the band Diamond Rio on background vocals. "Me and God" reached a peak of No. 16 on the country charts.

In December 2006, the 49th Annual Grammy Award nominations were announced. Turner received nods for Best Male Country Vocal Performance and for Best Country Album. That same month, a featurette on CMT Insider showed Turner in the studio working on the album. He mentioned that he wanted it to sound like music in the 18th and 19th centuries. Turner performed at the Ryman Auditorium where a live album was recorded, singing a song called, "Church in the Holler". Turner's album Josh Turner: Live At The Ryman was recorded in April and is available exclusively through Cracker Barrel restaurants.

Turner, along with veteran songwriters Brett James and Don Schlitz, wrote a song entitled "Say Yes"; recorded and released by singer Dusty Drake in 2007, the song was a minor Top 40 country hit for Drake, peaking at No. 36.

=== 2007–2011: Everything Is Fine and Haywire ===
On September 29, 2007, while giving an award to Roy Clark on Clark's 20th anniversary on the Grand Ole Opry, Turner was invited to become a member of the Grand Ole Opry. He was inducted by Vince Gill on October 27, 2007. At the time, he and Carrie Underwood were the youngest members of the Opry.

Turner's third studio album for MCA Nashville, titled Everything Is Fine, was released on October 30, 2007. Its lead-off single, "Firecracker", became Turner's third Top Ten hit on the country music charts, peaking at No. 2. The second single from Everything Is Fine, a duet with Trisha Yearwood entitled "Another Try", was released in late January 2008, peaking at No. 15. The title track was released as the third single and peaked at No. 20. Everything Is Fine has been certified gold.

At the end of June, Turner wrapped up recording his fourth album, Haywire. The lead-off single, "Why Don't We Just Dance", which was released on August 12, 2009, debuted at No. 57 on the U.S. Billboard Hot Country Songs chart for the week of September 5, 2009. The song went on to become Turner's third Number One hit, spending four consecutive weeks at the top in February 2010. The album was released on February 9, 2010, along with a deluxe version. "All Over Me" was released in April 2010 as the album's second single; it became Turner's fourth Number One. On September 27, 2010, Turner shot the video for "I Wouldn't Be a Man" in Nashville, which was the third single from Haywire. "Haywire" is now certified gold.

=== 2012–2017: Punching Bag and Deep South ===
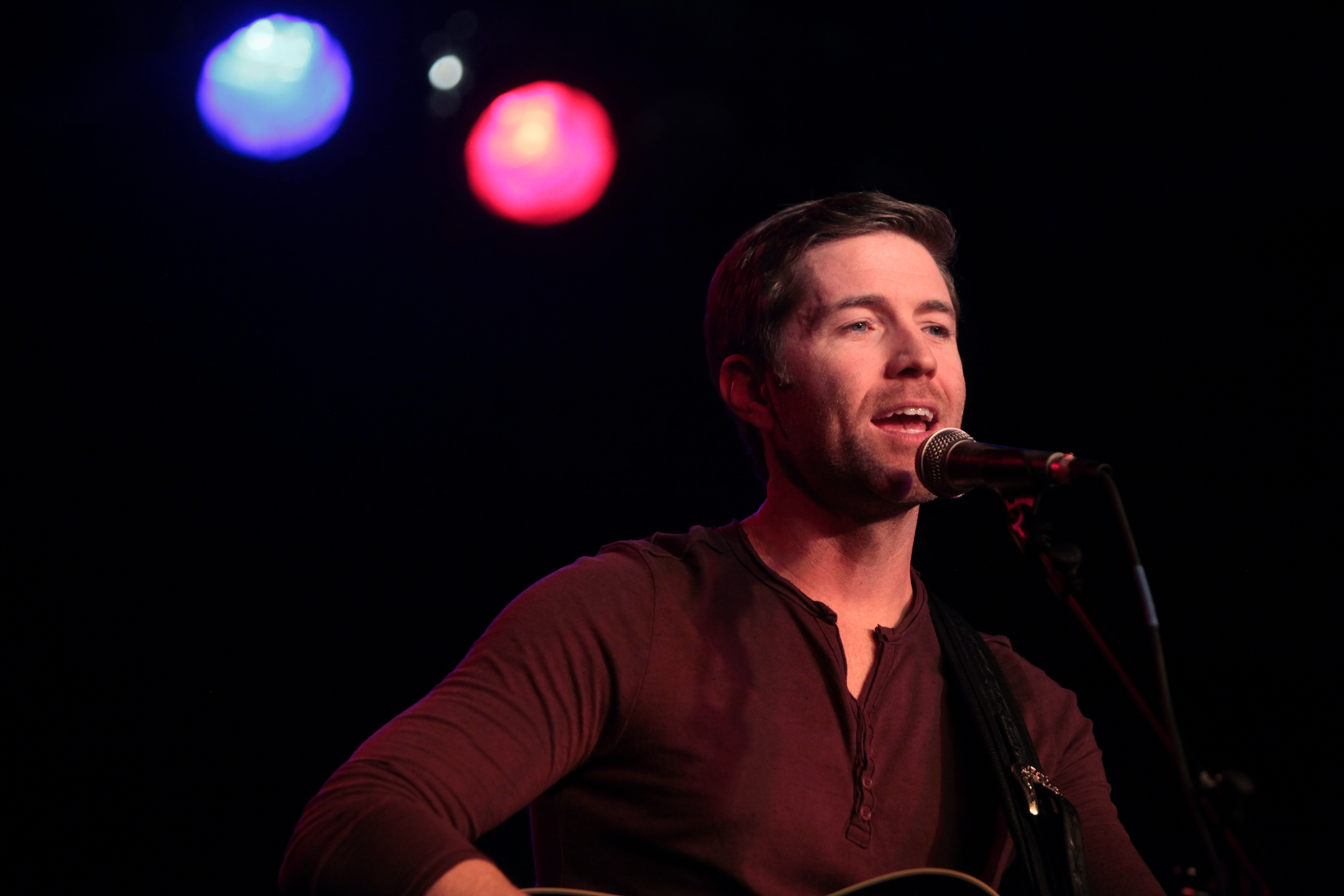
Turner in Des Moines, Iowa, in January 2016

Turner's fifth studio album, Punching Bag, was released via MCA Nashville on June 12, 2012, and preceded by the single "Time Is Love". The song, written by Tom Shapiro, Tony Martin, and Mark Nesler, was released digitally on December 20, 2011, and went for radio adds on January 9. The song reached No. 2 but finished the year as the No. 1 country song of 2012 according to Billboard. The album's second single "Find Me a Baby", was released to country radio on October 15, 2012, but it failed to make top 40 on the country charts.

Also in 2012, Turner released Live Across America with twelve of his songs recorded in concert in different cities. This album was distributed through Cracker Barrel. "Those are the most magical performances of each song," Turner said.

The lead single from Turner's upcoming sixth studio album, "Lay Low", was released to country radio on September 1, 2014. It reached a peak of No. 25 on Country Airplay, at which it remained stalled for several weeks. The single did not perform as expected on the charts, so Turner's label decided to delay the release of the album and its next single. The second single, "Hometown Girl", was released to radio on May 31, 2016. At Turner's show in Reading, Pennsylvania, on November 5, 2016, he announced that his new album would be released sometime in March 2017. The album, Deep South, was released on March 10, 2017, preceded by two sneak preview songs, "Deep South" and "Where the Girls Are" released on February 23, 2017. Deep South scored Turner his third No. 1 album on the US Top Country Album's Chart upon its release. Turner's second single, "Hometown Girl", from Deep South peaked at No. 2 on Billboard's Country Airplay Chart and at No. 1 on the Mediabase chart, which made it Turner's fifth No. 1 single. Turner's third single, "All About You", written by Craig Wiseman and Justin Weaver, was released on May 15, 2017.

=== 2018–2023: I Serve a Savior, Country State of Mind, and King Size Manger ===
After the release of Deep South, Turner began work on a project of gospel music. Titled I Serve a Savior, his seventh studio album was released on October 26, 2018. It consists of a collection of mostly gospel standards with a few original songs, including the title track that Turner co-wrote. The album also features appearances by Sonya Isaacs, Bobby Osborne, and Turner's own family (who sing and play instruments on a track penned by his wife and oldest son) and new live renditions of both "Long Black Train" and "Me and God".

Turner followed this release with two further passion projects: Country State of Mind (2020) and King Size Manger (2021), his eighth and ninth studio albums. Country State of Mind consisted of a collection of cover songs, while King Size Manger served as Turner's first album of Christmas music.

=== 2024–present: New music ===
In April 2024, it was announced that Turner had extended his record deal with MCA Nashville, his longtime label home of over two decades, and that "Heatin' Things Up" would be released as his new single. Turner's tenth studio album, This Country Music Thing, was released on August 16, 2024.

== Acting ==
Turner played George Beverly Shea in the 2008 film Billy: The Early Years, about the evangelist Billy Graham. Shea was the soloist for the Billy Graham Crusades.

== Personal life ==
Turner married Jennifer Ford, in 2003. They met as students of Belmont University. Jennifer travels with Josh when he is on tour, playing keyboards and singing background vocals. They have four sons.

Turner is a devout Christian. "I don't believe God wants me to be a gospel singer," Turner said regarding his religion. "He just wants me to be a Christian singer. That's who I am, a Christian."

== Discography ==
Studio albums

- Long Black Train (2003)
- Your Man (2006)
- Everything Is Fine (2007)
- Haywire (2010)
- Punching Bag (2012)
- Deep South (2017)
- I Serve a Savior (2018)
- Country State of Mind (2020)
- King Size Manger (2021)
- This Country Music Thing (2024)

== Awards and nominations ==
Year	Category	Association	Result
2004	Top New Artist	Academy of Country Music	Nominated
2004	Breakthrough Video of the Year – "Long Black Train"	CMT Music Awards	Nominated
2004	Horizon Award	Country Music Association Awards	Nominated
2004	Song of the Year – "Long Black Train"	Country Music Association Awards	Nominated
2004	Song of the Year – "Long Black Train"	Inspirational Country Music Awards	Won
2004	Songwriter of the Year	Inspirational Country Music Awards	Won
2004	Mainstream Country Artist	Inspirational Country Music Awards	Won
2005	Best New Artist	Academy of Country Music	Nominated
2006	Song of the Year – "Me and God"	Inspirational Country Music Awards	Won
2006	Songwriter of the Year	Inspirational Country Music Awards	Won
2006	Mainstream Country Artists	Inspirational Country Music Awards	Won
2006	Horizon Award	Country Music Association Awards	Nominated
2007	Male Vocalist of the Year	Country Music Association Awards	Nominated
2007	Male Country Vocal Performance – "Would You Go With Me"	Grammy Awards	Nominated
2007	Country Album of the Year – Your Man	Grammy Awards	Nominated
2007	Single Record of the Year – "Would You Go with Me"	Country Music Association Awards	Nominated
2007	Song of the Year – "Would You Go with Me"	Country Music Association Awards	Nominated
2007	Vocal Event of the Year – "Me and God" (with Ralph Stanley)	Country Music Association Awards	Nominated
2024	Inducted	South Carolina Entertainment and Music Hall of Fame	Won
