= 2006 in country music =

This is a list of notable events in country music that took place in the year 2006.

== Events ==
- January 14 – With the song, "She Let Herself Go", George Strait scores his 40th No. 1 hit on the Billboard Hot Country Songs chart, all of them solo. It ties a 20-year-old record for most No. 1's on the country chart, held by Conway Twitty (35 solo, five duet with Loretta Lynn).
- January 21 – Kix Brooks, one half of the country superstar duo Brooks & Dunn, takes over as host of "American Country Countdown," succeeding longtime host Bob Kingsley.
- February 4 – Gretchen Wilson guest Miranda Lambert at the Austin City Limits.
- April – Hank Williams Jr. is arrested in Memphis, Tennessee, for assault after attempting to choke a teenage waitress at a hotel there.
- April 10 – Carrie Underwood and Gretchen Wilson at the CMT Music Awards.
  - Miranda Lambert and Jack Ingram at the CMT Music Awards.
- May – People reports on the engagement of Keith Urban and actress Nicole Kidman. The two are married on June 25. Also during the month, Little Big Town members Jimi Westbrook and Karen Fairchild are wed; their marriage was announced in July.
- May 3 – Lynn Anderson arrested in New Mexico after causing a traffic accident at a local intersection due to drunk driving. She was released the next day on bond. Anderson was taken to court later that year where all her previous charges were dropped, as long as she didn't commit any more offenses.
- May 21 – Grand Ole Opry mainstay Billy Walker is killed in a car accident near Fort Deposit, Alabama, when the van he was riding in overturned along Interstate 65. Also killed in the wreck are Walker's wife, Bettie; and two member of his band. His 21-year-old grandson, Joshua Brooks, is critically injured. Walker was returning home from a show near Gulf Shores, Alabama.
- May 23 – The Tennessean of Nashville reports plans by Academy of Country Music to move its awards show to April, after consistently being drubbed in the ratings by powerhouse American Idol. The ACMs, which aired May 23 on CBS, appeared opposite Fox's American Idol for the fourth year in a row.
  - Kenny Chesney and Sara Evans at the MGM Grand Las Vegas.
- June 24 – The first Midsummer Day country music festival in Drottningstorp is held.
- July 4 – Johnny Cash releases American V which instantly hits #1.
- August 4 – Jimmy C. Newman celebrates his 50th Grand Ole Opry Anniversary
- August 17 – Los Angeles' lone country music station, KZLA-FM, switches its format to urban pop.
- August 19 – Keith Urban's "Once in a Lifetime" becomes the highest-ever debuting song on the Billboard Hot Country Songs chart during the Broadcast Data Systems-era, ranking at No. 17 in its first week. "Lifetime" breaks the 10-month-old BDS-era standard set by "Good Ride Cowboy" by Garth Brooks.
- August 25 – George Jones Celebrates his 50th Grand Ole Opry anniversary
- September 5 – Kellie Pickler and Aaron Tippin in a Carolina country music.
- September 12 – Sara Evans and professional partner Tony Dovolani begin competing on ABC's Dancing with the Stars, to rousing reviews. Evans' gig will last four weeks.
- September 18 – Willie Nelson and several of his band members are charged with misdemeanor drug possession in Louisiana. State police had pulled Nelson's tour bus over for a routine commercial inspection and, after smelling a suspicious odor inside, searched the bus and found marijuana and psychedelic mushrooms.
- September 30
  - George Strait finally breaks Conway Twitty's record by scoring his record 41st No. 1 hit on the Billboard Hot Country Songs chart with "Give It Away".
  - The documentary Dixie Chicks: Shut Up and Sing is released. The film chronicles the lives of the Dixie Chicks band members and the fallout that resulted after lead singer Natalie Maines made critical remarks about U.S. President George W. Bush during a 2003 concert in London, England.
- October 13 – One day after abruptly leaving Dancing with the Stars, news breaks that Sara Evans was seeking a divorce from her husband, Craig Schelske. Allegations Evans levied against Schelske included his affair with the family's ex-nanny, that he watched and downloaded pornography in the house, and his removal of $275,000 from the couple's joint bank account on the day the divorce decree was filed.
- October 19 – Keith Urban checks himself into a rehabilitation center for alcohol abuse.
- October 20 – Flicka, an adaptation of the 1941 children's novel, hits the movie theaters. Tim McGraw is in the leading adult male role as Wyoming rancher Rob McLaughlin.
- November 3 – Stonewall Jackson celebrates his 50th Grand Ole Opry Aniversary
- November 6
  - The Country Music Association Awards airs for the first time on ABC. The awards show had been on CBS since 1972. Keith Urban, who won the Male Vocalist of the Year, is absent due to his rehab stint, and co-host Ronnie Dunn read Urban's acceptance letter. Hall of Fame inductee Kris Kristofferson presented the inductions for 2006 inductees George Strait, Harold Bradley and Sonny James, each of whom gave brief acceptance speeches; Strait also performed his No. 1 hit "Give It Away." Controversy reigned when Faith Hill appeared to react angrily after Carrie Underwood won the Female Vocalist of the Year award.
  - Billy Currington quest Kellie Pickler and Carrie Underwood at the 2006 CMA Awards.
- December 3 – The John F. Kennedy Center for the Performing Arts honors Dolly Parton for her lifetime contributions to the arts.

=== No dates ===
- No less than nine acts achieved their first No. 1 hit on the Billboard Hot Country Songs chart during 2006, the most since 1991. Those artists were Carrie Underwood, Josh Turner, Bon Jovi along with Jennifer Nettles of Sugarland, Jack Ingram, Jason Aldean, Rodney Atkins, The Wreckers, Heartland and Sugarland. Four of those acts – Bon Jovi, Nettles, The Wreckers and Heartland – turned the trick with their first charted country single. (Although she previously had two Top 5 hits and a Top 10 hit as a member of Sugarland, Jennifer Nettles made her first entry on the Hot Country Songs chart under her own name as part of a collaboration with Bon Jovi, which, in turn, also made their first Hot Country Songs chart entry. Their collaboration, "Who Says You Can't Go Home", ultimately peaked at No. 1 on that chart – a first for both Nettles and Bon Jovi – and as of late, it is the only No. 1 hit for either act there. Sugarland, Nettles' group, would eventually score their first career No. 1 hit on the same chart by the end of the year.)

During that same 12-month time span, chart veteran George Strait extended his No. 1 string to a Billboard-best 41, beating Conway Twitty's record of 40 No. 1's, while Dolly Parton scored her 25th No. 1 (as part of a duet with Brad Paisley) and Kenny Chesney extended his string of No. 1's to 10.

== Top hits of the year ==
The following songs placed within the Top 20 on the Hot Country Songs or Canada Country charts in 2006:

US	CAN	Single	Artist	Reference
18	—	8th of November	Big & Rich	
1	1	Before He Cheats	Carrie Underwood	
8	21	Believe	Brooks & Dunn	
9	15	Boondocks	Little Big Town	
1	6	Brand New Girlfriend	Steve Holy	
4	13	Bring It On Home	Little Big Town	
4	2	Building Bridges	Brooks & Dunn	
9	5	Cheatin'	Sara Evans	
15	23	Crash Here Tonight	Toby Keith	
14	21	The Dollar	Jamey Johnson	
2	3	Don't Forget to Remember Me	Carrie Underwood	
17	24	Down in Mississippi (Up to No Good)	Sugarland	
19	—	Drunker Than Me	Trent Tomlinson	
45	14	Everybody Knows	Dixie Chicks	
1	2	Every Mile a Memory	Dierks Bentley	
7	15	Every Time I Hear Your Name	Keith Anderson	
19	31	Favorite State of Mind	Josh Gracin	
13	29	Feels Just Like It Should	Pat Green	
16	31	Findin' a Good Man	Danielle Peck	
3	3	Get Drunk and Be Somebody	Toby Keith	
1	1	Give It Away	George Strait	
17	5	A Good Man	Emerson Drive	
2	8	Honky Tonk Badonkadonk	Trace Adkins	
14	24	How 'Bout You	Eric Church	
17	34	I Can't Unlove You	Kenny Rogers	
12	25	I Got You	Craig Morgan	
1	9	I Loved Her First	Heartland	
1	1	If You're Going Through Hell (Before the Devil Even Knows)	Rodney Atkins	
1	1	Jesus, Take the Wheel	Carrie Underwood	
7	9	Just Might (Make Me Believe)	Sugarland	
15	25	Kerosene	Miranda Lambert	
2	3	Last Day of My Life	Phil Vassar	
1	1	Leave the Pieces	The Wreckers	
4	20	Life Ain't Always Beautiful	Gary Allan	
18	10	Life Is a Highway	Rascal Flatts	
15	14	Like Red on a Rose	Alan Jackson	
5	10	Like We Never Loved at All	Faith Hill	
2	1	A Little Too Late	Toby Keith	
1	1	Living in Fast Forward	Kenny Chesney	
23	20	Love Will Always Win	Garth Brooks with Trisha Yearwood	
12	21	Love You	Jack Ingram	
5	1	The Lucky One	Faith Hill	
6	15	Me and My Gang	Rascal Flatts	
10	24	Mountains	Lonestar	
3	3	My Little Girl	Tim McGraw	
6	4	My Old Friend	Tim McGraw	
1	1	My Wish	Rascal Flatts	
4	7	Nobody but Me	Blake Shelton	
16	—	Nobody Gonna Tell Me What to Do	Van Zant	
36	17	Not Ready to Make Nice	Dixie Chicks	
6	1	Once in a Lifetime	Keith Urban	
11	7	The Seashores of Old Mexico	George Strait	
1	3	Settle for a Slowdown	Dierks Bentley	
5	12	She Don't Tell Me To	Montgomery Gentry	
1	3	She Let Herself Go	George Strait	
9	6	Size Matters (Someday)	Joe Nichols	
7	14	Some People Change	Montgomery Gentry	
2	2	Something's Gotta Give	LeAnn Rimes	
1	1	Summertime	Kenny Chesney	
7	1	Sunshine and Summertime	Faith Hill	
20	33	Swing	Trace Adkins	
2	2	Tonight I Wanna Cry	Keith Urban	
19	31	Two Pink Lines	Eric Church	
1	1	Want To	Sugarland	
1	1	What Hurts the Most	Rascal Flatts	
1	2	When I Get Where I'm Going	Brad Paisley featuring Dolly Parton	
4	1	When the Stars Go Blue	Tim McGraw	
1	11	Wherever You Are	Jack Ingram	
1	3	Who Says You Can't Go Home	Bon Jovi duet with Jennifer Nettles	
1	4	Why	Jason Aldean	
13	30	Why, Why, Why	Billy Currington	
1	1	The World	Brad Paisley	
1	5	Would You Go with Me	Josh Turner	
16	—	Yee Haw	Jake Owen	
3	4	You Save Me	Kenny Chesney	
1	2	Your Man	Josh Turner	

== Top new album releases ==
The following albums placed within the Top 50 on the Top Country Albums charts in 2006:

US	Album	Artist	Record label
6	21 Number Ones	Kenny Rogers	Capitol Nashville
1	American V: A Hundred Highways	Johnny Cash	American Recordings
4	Blue Collar Comedy Tour: One for the Road	Various Artists	Jack
2	Brand New Girlfriend	Steve Holy	Curb
8	Brad Paisley Christmas	Brad Paisley	Arista Nashville
4	Broken Bridges soundtrack	Various Artists	Show Dog Nashville
2	Cannonball	Pat Green	BNA
3	Chris Young	Chris Young	RCA Nashville
10	A Classic Christmas	Wynonna Judd	Curb
1	Dangerous Man	Trace Adkins	Capitol Nashville
2	Enjoy the Ride	Sugarland	Mercury Nashville
6	Fortuneteller's Melody	SHeDAISY	Lyric Street
2	Greatest Hits, Vol. 1	Phil Vassar	Arista Nashville
3	I Loved Her First	Heartland	Lofton Creek
1	If You're Going Through Hell	Rodney Atkins	Curb
1	It Just Comes Natural	George Strait	MCA Nashville
8	Just a Matter of Time	Randy Rogers Band	Mercury Nashville
4	Last Man Standing: The Duets	Jerry Lee Lewis	Artists First
1	Like Red on a Rose	Alan Jackson	Arista Nashville
10	The Little Willies	The Little Willies	Milking Bull
1	Live: Live Those Songs Again	Kenny Chesney	BNA
1	Long Trip Alone	Dierks Bentley	Capitol Nashville
1	Love, Pain & the Whole Crazy Thing	Keith Urban	Capitol Nashville
1	Me and My Gang	Rascal Flatts	Lyric Street
4	Men & Mascara	Julie Roberts	Mercury Nashville
10	Mountains	Lonestar	BNA
7	Pay the Devil	Van Morrison	Lost Highway
1	Precious Memories	Alan Jackson	Arista Nashville
1	Reflected: Greatest Hits Vol. 2	Tim McGraw	Curb
7	Sinners Like Me	Eric Church	Capitol Nashville
1	Small Town Girl	Kellie Pickler	BNA
5	Some People Change	Montgomery Gentry	Columbia Nashville
1	Songs of Inspiration	Alabama	RCA Nashville
4	Stand Still, Look Pretty	The Wreckers	Maverick/Warner Bros. Nashville
8	Startin' with Me	Jake Owen	RCA Nashville
1	Take the Weather with You	Jimmy Buffett	Mailboat
1	Taking the Long Way	Dixie Chicks	Columbia Nashville
1	Taylor Swift	Taylor Swift	Big Machine
3	That's How They Do It in Dixie: The Essential Collection	Hank Williams Jr.	Curb
4	These Days	Vince Gill	MCA Nashville
4	Totally Country Vol. 5	Various Artists	Sony BMG
5	Water & Bridges	Kenny Rogers	Capitol Nashville
2	White Trash with Money	Toby Keith	Show Dog Nashville
2	You Can't Fix Stupid	Ron White	Jack
1	Your Man	Josh Turner	MCA Nashville

=== Other top albums ===
US	Album	Artist	Record label
26	16 Biggest Hits	Johnny Cash and June Carter Cash	Legacy/Columbia Nashville
43	All American Bluegrass Girl	Rhonda Vincent	Rounder
27	Back to Tulsa - Live and Loud at Cain's Ballroom	Cross Canadian Ragweed	Universal South
29	Believe: Songs of Faith from Today's Top Country & Christian Artists	Various Artists	Arista Nashville
27	Big Iron World	Old Crow Medicine Show	Nettwerk
34	Billboard #1s: Classic Country	Various Artists	Rhino
31	Black & Blue	Roy D. Mercer	Capitol Nashville
18	Black Cadillac	Rosanne Cash	Capitol Nashville
38	A Blue Collar Christmas: Redneck Style	Various Artists	Madacy
34	Corn Fed	Shannon Brown	Warner Bros.
30	Countrified	Emerson Drive	Midas
20	Country Is My Rock	Trent Tomlinson	Lyric Street
44	Country Legends: I Walk the Line	Johnny Cash	BCI
23	Danielle Peck	Danielle Peck	Big Machine
36	Different Things	Tracy Byrd	Blind Mule
20	The Dollar	Jamey Johnson	BNA
12	Electric Rodeo	Shooter Jennings	Universal South
14	Elvis Christmas	Elvis Presley	RCA
27	Flicka Soundtrack	Various Artists	StyleSonic
12	Greatest Hits II	Diamond Rio	Arista Nashville
35	Here and Now	Darryl Worley	903 Music
46	How to Grow a Woman from the Ground	Chris Thile	Sugar Hill
26	JC: Johnny Cash	Johnny Cash	Sun
45	John Corbett	John Corbett	Funbone
25	Kicking out the Footlights... Again	George Jones and Merle Haggard	Bandit
32	Larry the Cable Guy: Health Inspector Soundtrack	Various Artists	Jack
12	Leave the Light On	Jeff Bates	RCA Nashville
28	The Legend of Johnny Cash Vol. II	Johnny Cash	Island
13	Little Bit of Life	Craig Morgan	Broken Bow
19	A Little More Livin'	Trent Willmon	Columbia Nashville
33	Live: Wherever You Are	Jack Ingram	Big Machine
28	Livin' Lovin' Rockin' Rollin': The 25th Anniversary Collection	Alabama	Legacy/Sony BMG
46	The Lost Trailers	The Lost Trailers	BNA
46	My Life	Ronnie Milsap	RCA Nashville
34	Now & Then	Aaron Tippin	Nippit/Rust
22	Personal File	Johnny Cash	Legacy/Columbia Nashville
31	Povertyneck Hillbillies	Povertyneck Hillbillies	Rust
35	A Prairie Home Companion Soundtrack	Various Artists	New Line
41	Reasons Why: The Very Best	Nickel Creek	Sugar Hill
49	Redneck Christmas	Various Artists	Time Life
29	Rockie Lynne	Rockie Lynne	Universal South
23	Rockin' You Tonight	Blaine Larsen	BNA
25	She Was Country When Country Wasn't Cool: A Tribute to Barbara Mandrell	Various Artists	BNA
19	Songbird	Willie Nelson	Lost Highway
17	Straight to Hell	Hank Williams III	Curb
36	This Old Road	Kris Kristofferson	New West
12	Three Wooden Crosses	Various Artists	Word
47	Today's Country Christmas	Various Artists	Sony BMG
33	The Ultimate Collection	Chris LeDoux	Capitol Nashville
24	Wanna Be Your Joe	Billy Ray Cyrus	New Door
24	You Don't Know Me: The Songs of Cindy Walker	Willie Nelson	Lost Highway

== Deaths ==
- March 23 – Cindy Walker, 87, prolific songwriter ("You Don't Know Me," "Cherokee Maiden"). (extended illness)
- March 25 – Buck Owens, 76, one of the pioneers of the Bakersfield Sound; co-host of Hee Haw. (heart attack)
- April 24 – Bonnie Owens, 76, singer-songwriter and ex-wife of Buck Owens and Merle Haggard (complications from Alzheimer's disease).
- May 21 – Billy Walker, 77, Grand Ole Opry legend best known for "Charlie's Shoes" and "Cross the Brazos at Waco" (car accident).
- August 14 – Johnny Duncan, 67, country music stalwart of the 1970s, best known for a series of duets with Janie Fricke. (heart attack)
- October 14 – Freddy Fender, 69, Tex Mex-styled singer-songwriter who achieved his greatest success in the mid-1970s ("Before the Next Teardrop Falls," "Wasted Days and Wasted Nights"), and recorded with two Tejano bands. (lung cancer)
- November 1 – Buddy Killen, 74, record producer and music publishing owner.
- December 22 – Dennis Linde, 63, well-respected songwriter of hits for acts ranging from Elvis Presley and Roger Miller to Garth Brooks and the Dixie Chicks. (idiopathic pulmonary fibrosis)

== Hall of Fame inductees ==
=== Bluegrass Music Hall of Fame inductees ===
- The Lewis Family
- Syd Nathan

=== Country Music Hall of Fame inductees ===
- Harold Bradley (1926–2019)
- Sonny James (1928–2016)
- George Strait (born 1952)

=== Canadian Country Music Hall of Fame inductees ===
- Terry Carisse
- Brian Ahern
- Curley Gurlock

== Major awards ==
=== Grammy Awards ===
(presented February 11, 2007 in Los Angeles)

- Best Female Country Vocal Performance – "Jesus, Take the Wheel", Carrie Underwood
- Best Male Country Vocal Performance – "The Reason Why", Vince Gill
- Best Country Performance by a Duo or Group with Vocal – "Not Ready to Make Nice," Dixie Chicks
- Best Country Collaboration with Vocals – "Who Says You Can't Go Home", Bon Jovi with Jennifer Nettles
- Best Country Instrumental Performance – "Whiskey Before Breakfast", Bryan Sutton and Doc Watson
- Best Country Song – "Jesus, Take the Wheel", Brett James, Hillary Lindsey and Gordie Sampson
- Best Country Album – Taking the Long Way, Dixie Chicks
- Best Bluegrass Album – Instrumentals, Ricky Skaggs and Kentucky Thunder

=== Juno Awards ===
(presented April 1, 2007 in Saskatoon)

- Country Recording of the Year – Somebody Wrote Love, George Canyon

=== CMT Music Awards ===
(presented April 10 in Nashville)

- Video of the Year – "Better Life", Keith Urban
- Male Video of the Year – "Who You'd Be Today", Kenny Chesney
- Female Video of the Year – "Jesus, Take the Wheel", Carrie Underwood
- Group/Duo Video of the Year – "Skin (Sarabeth)", Rascal Flatts
- Breakthrough Video of the Year – "Jesus, Take the Wheel", Carrie Underwood
- Collaborative Video of the Year – "Who Says You Can't Go Home", Bon Jovi Featuring Jennifer Nettles
- Hottest Video of the Year – "Must Be Doin' Somethin' Right", Billy Currington
- Most Inspiring Video of the Year – "When I Get Where I'm Going", Brad Paisley Featuring Dolly Parton
- Video Director of the Year – "Like We Never Loved at All", Faith Hill Featuring Tim McGraw (Director: Sophie Muller)
- Johnny Cash Visionary Award – Hank Williams Jr.

=== Americana Music Honors & Awards ===
- Album of the Year – Childish Things (James McMurty)
- Artist of the Year – Neil Young
- Duo/Group of the Year – Drive-By Truckers
- Song of the Year – "We Can't Make It Here" (James McMurty)
- Emerging Artist of the Year – The Greencards
- Instrumentalist of the Year – Kenny Vaughan
- Spirit of Americana/Free Speech Award – Charlie Daniels
- Lifetime Achievement: Songwriting – Rodney Crowell
- Lifetime Achievement: Performance – Alejandro Escovedo
- Lifetime Achievement: Instrumentalist – Kenny Vaughan
- Lifetime Achievement: Executive – Barry Poss
- Lifetime Achievement: Producer/Engineer – Allen Toussaint

=== Academy of Country Music ===
(presented May 15, 2007 in Las Vegas)

- Entertainer of the Year – Kenny Chesney
- Song of the Year – "Give It Away", Bill Anderson, Buddy Cannon and Jamey Johnson
- Single of the Year – "Give It Away", George Strait
- Album of the Year – Some Hearts, Carrie Underwood
- Top Male Vocalist – Brad Paisley
- Top Female Vocalist – Carrie Underwood
- Top Vocal Duo – Brooks & Dunn
- Top Vocal Group – Rascal Flatts
- Top New Male Vocalist – Rodney Atkins
- Top New Female Vocalist – Miranda Lambert
- Top New Duo or Group – Little Big Town
- Video of the Year – "Before He Cheats", Carrie Underwood (Director: Roman White)
- Vocal Event of the Year – "Building Bridges", Brooks & Dunn, Vince Gill and Sheryl Crow
- ACM/Home Depot Humanitarian of the Year – Brooks & Dunn
- Cliffie Stone Pioneer Award – Dolly Parton, Don Williams and the late Harlan Howard and Waylon Jennings
- Jim Reeves International Award – Buck Owens
- Mae Boren Axton Award – Jack Lameier

=== ARIA Awards ===
(presented in Sydney on October 29, 2006)

- Best Country Album – Brighter Day (Troy Cassar-Daley)

=== Canadian Country Music Association ===
(presented September 11 in Saint John)

- Kraft Cheez Whiz Fans' Choice Award – Terri Clark
- Male Artist of the Year – George Canyon
- Female Artist of the Year – Carolyn Dawn Johnson
- Group or Duo of the Year – The Road Hammers
- SOCAN Song of the Year – "Jesus, Take the Wheel", Brett James, Hillary Lindsey, Gordie Sampson
- Single of the Year – "Somebody Wrote Love", George Canyon
- Album of the Year – Hair in My Eyes Like a Highland Steer, Corb Lund
- Top Selling Album – The Legend of Johnny Cash, Johnny Cash
- CMT Video of the Year – "East Bound and Down", The Road Hammers
- Chevy Trucks Rising Star Award – Johnny Reid
- Roots Artist or Group of the Year – Corb Lund

=== Country Music Association ===
(presented November 6 in Nashville, Tennessee)

- Entertainer of the Year – Kenny Chesney
- Song of the Year – "Believe", Craig Wiseman and Ronnie Dunn
- Single of the Year – "Believe", Brooks & Dunn
- Album of the Year – Time Well Wasted, Brad Paisley
- Male Vocalist of the Year – Keith Urban
- Female Vocalist of the Year – Carrie Underwood
- Vocal Duo of the Year – Brooks & Dunn
- Vocal Group of the Year – Rascal Flatts
- Horizon Award – Carrie Underwood
- Video of the Year – "Believe", Brooks & Dunn (Directors: Robert Deaton and George J. Flanigen IV)
- Vocal Event of the Year – "When I Get Where I'm Going", Brad Paisley and Dolly Parton
- Musician of the Year – Randy Scruggs

=== Kennedy Center Honors ===
Country stars who were honored in 2006

Dolly Parton

=== Hollywood Walk of Fame ===
stars who were honored in 2006

Amy Grant and Tim McGraw

== Other links ==
- Country Music Association
- Inductees of the Country Music Hall of Fame
- 2006 in Swiss music
