= Your Man =

Your Man may refer to:

- Your Man (album), by Josh Turner, 2006
  - "Your Man" (Josh Turner song), 2005
- "Your Man" (Down with Webster song), 2010
- "Your Man", a song by Five for Fighting from Bookmarks, 2013
- "Your Man", a song by Joji from Nectar, 2020
- "Your Man", a song by Ocean Drive, 2009
- "Your Man", a song by Smash Mouth from Smash Mouth, 2001
