= For the Good Times (The Little Willies album) =

Studio album by the Little Willies
- Released: January 6, 2012 (United States)
- Recorded: 2010–2011
- Genres: Country, alternative country
- Labels: Milking Bull, Parlophone
- Producer: Lee Alexander

The Little Willies chronology
The Little Willies (2006)	For the Good Times (2012)

Professional ratings
Review scores
Source	Rating
Allmusic	4/5 stars
Slant Magazine	3.5/5 stars
Paste Magazine	(8.5/10)

For the Good Times is the second album from the American band the Little Willies. It was recorded in 2010-2011.

== Track listing ==
No.	Title	Writer(s)	Length
1.	"I Worship You"	Ralph Stanley	2:50
2.	"Remember Me"	Scotty Wiseman	4:00
3.	"Diesel Smoke, Dangerous Curves"	Cal Martin	3:05
4.	"Lovesick Blues"	Cliff Friend, Irving Mills	4:00
5.	"Tommy Rockwood"	Jim Campilongo	2:36
6.	"Fist City"	Loretta Lynn	3:00
7.	"Permanently Lonely"	Willie Nelson	2:40
8.	"Foul Owl on the Prowl"	Quincy Jones, Alan Bergman, Marilyn Bergman	3:34
9.	"Wide Open Road"	Johnny Cash	2:30
10.	"For the Good Times"	Kris Kristofferson	3:46
11.	"If You've Got the Money I've Got the Time"	Lefty Frizzell, Jim Beck	1:46
12.	"Jolene"	Dolly Parton	4:50

iTunes Bonus Track
No.	Title	Writer(s)	Length
13.	"Pennies on the Floor"	Jim Campilongo, Van Riff	2:52

Amazon Bonus Track
No.	Title	Writer(s)	Length
13.	"Delia's Gone"	Dick Toops, Karl Silbersdorf	4:10

== Charts ==
Chart performance
Chart (2012)	Peak position
Australian Country Albums (ARIA)	20
Australian Hitseekers Albums (ARIA)	13
Austrian Albums (Ö3 Austria)	52
Belgian Albums (Ultratop Flanders)	43
Belgian Albums (Ultratop Wallonia)	82
Canadian Albums (Nielsen SoundScan)	44
Croatian International Albums (HDU)	19
Czech Albums (ČNS IFPI)	45
Dutch Albums (Album Top 100)	66
French Albums (SNEP)	131
Italian Albums (FIMI)	76
Japanese Albums (Oricon)	19
South Korean International Albums (Circle)	11
Swiss Albums (Schweizer Hitparade)	45
UK Albums (Official Charts)	116
UK Country Albums (Official Charts)	1
US Billboard 200	45
US Tastemaker Albums (Billboard)	7
US Top Country Albums (Billboard)	9
