= Sunny Ozell =

American singer-songwriter (born 1978)

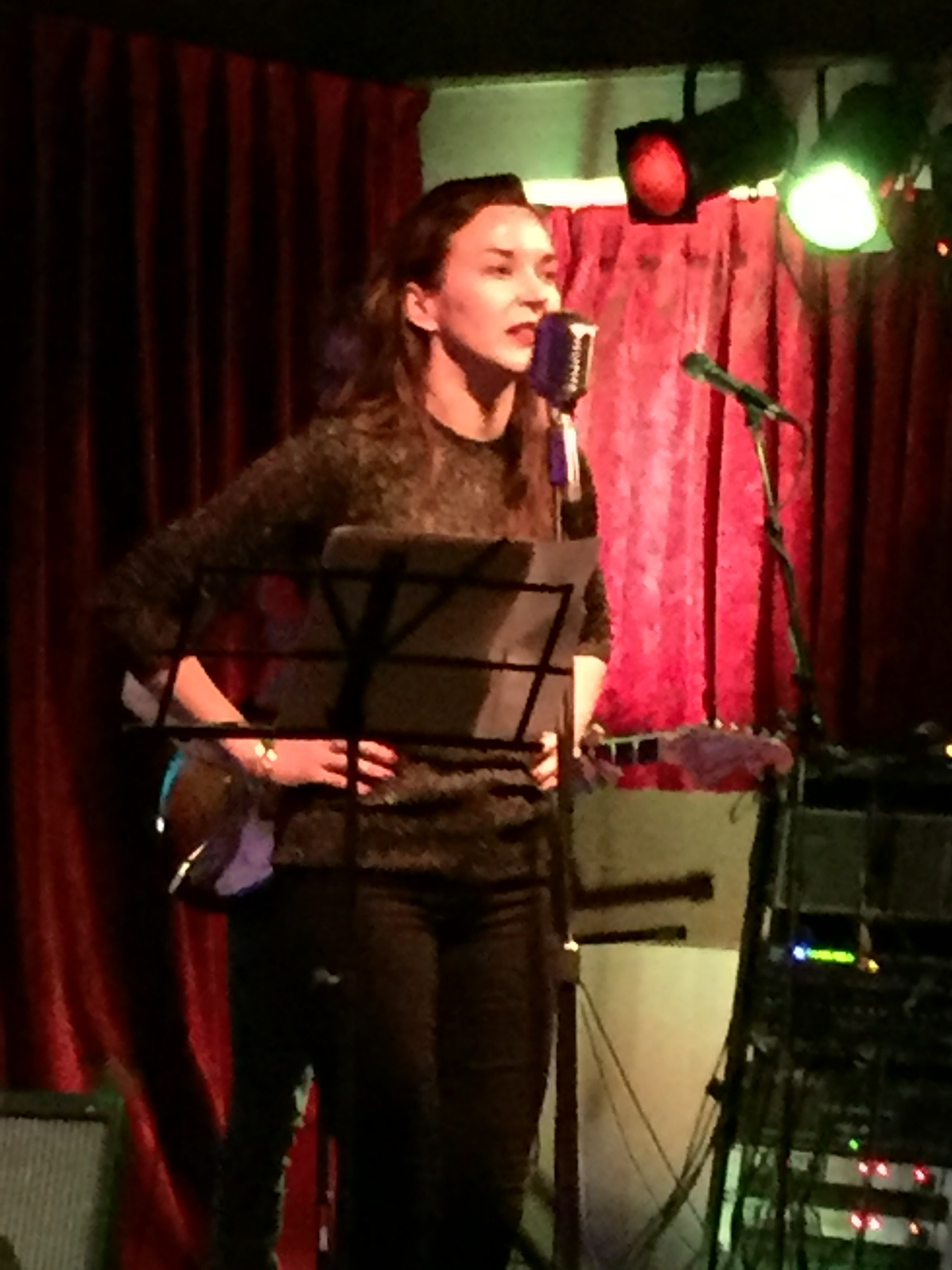
- Ozell in 2016
- Born: December 23, 1978 (age 47); Reno, Nevada, U.S.
- Occupations: Singer; songwriter
- Spouse: Patrick Stewart (m. 2013; died 2026)
- Musical career
- Genres: Country; jazz; americana; blues; pop; country pop
- Instrument: Vocals
- Years active: 1989–present
- Label: Man in the Moon
- Website: Official website

Sunny Ozell, Lady Stewart (born December 23, 1978) is an American singer and songwriter. She was married to the English actor Sir Patrick Stewart from 2013 until his death in 2026.

== Early life ==
Ozell grew up in Reno, Nevada, in a musical household and began her classical training at an early age. Her parents did not play or perform themselves, but they had a passion for music and took music education seriously, getting Ozell to play the violin from the age of just four years old. She also started vocal training at the age of 11 years and soon after realised that music was the career path she wanted to pursue. From 13, she started working with an opera coach.

At university in Boulder, Colorado, she majored in English literature and sang in blues bands and soul-funk bands in her spare time throughout college. After graduating, she started performing in clubs around New York and became a part of the city's musical community with her blend of jazz, blues and American roots music, performing both original material and interpretations of works by other blues, soul and country songwriters.

== Music career ==
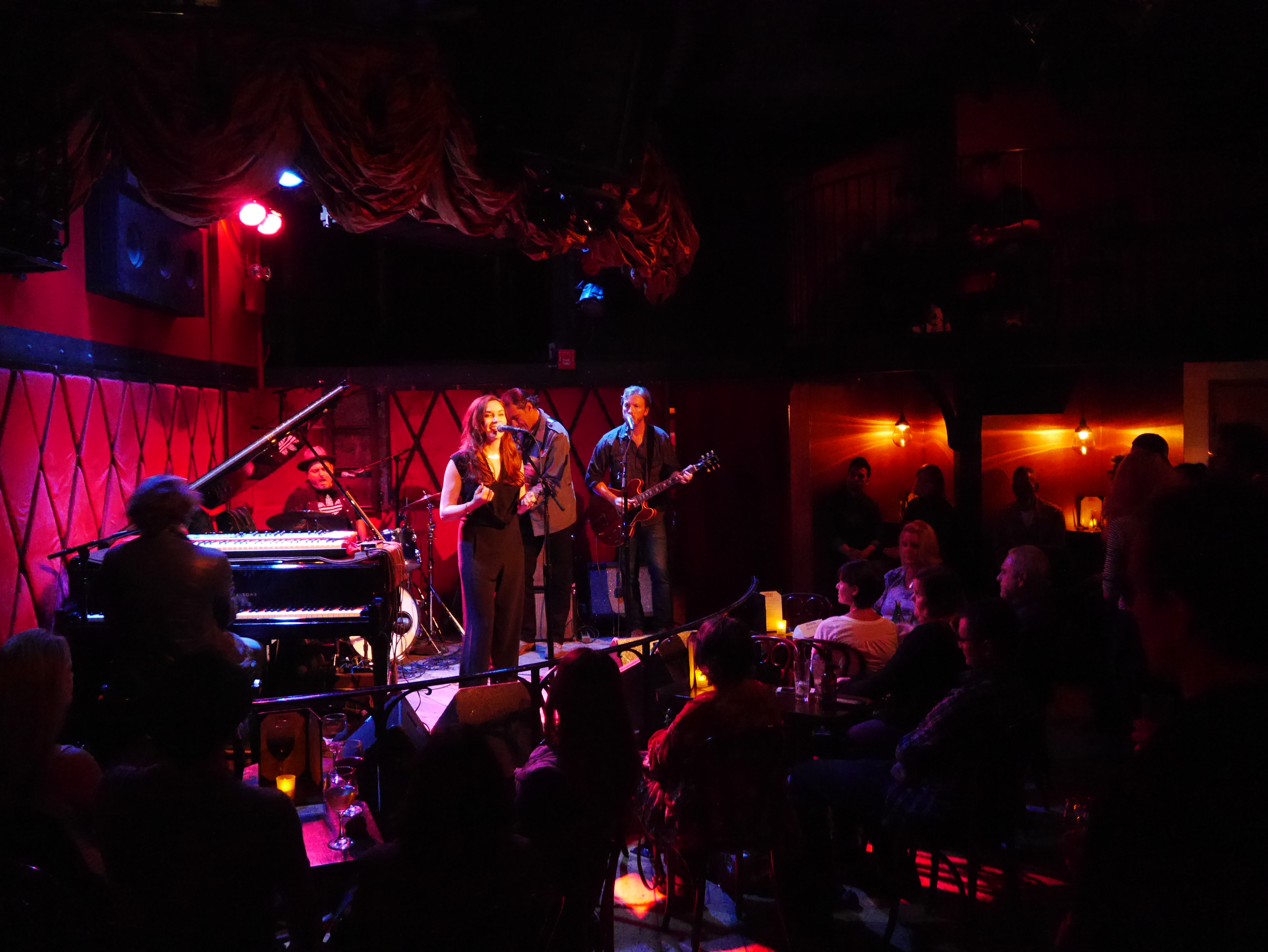
Ozell on stage at Rockwood Music in New York City, 2015

She considers Take It with Me (which mainly consists of covers of works from artists such as Howard Jones, Hank Williams, Randy Newman, T Bone Burnett and Tom Waits) to be her debut album. Both on Take It with Me and live, Sunny Ozell works with musicians, including guitarist Aaron Lee Tasjan (Semi Precious Weapons, Drivin N Cryin), bassist Andy Hess (the Black Crowes, Gov't Mule, Uberjam), keyboard player Andrew Sherman (George Duke, Mariah Carey), pedal steel player Jon Graboff (Ryan Adams & The Cardinals), backing singer Nicki Richards (Madonna) and drummer Ethan Eubanks (Teddy Thompson, Crash Test Dummies, Joseph Arthur). Ozell performs frequently at Rockwood Music Hall and previously at The Living Room until its closure in New York and has collaborated with musicians such as Jim Campilongo and Adam Levy of Norah Jones’ backing band, and Krystle Warren.

=== Musical style and influence ===
Ozell cites Gillian Welch and David Rawlings as influences, for their "simplicity and their total lack of pretension", but also American jazz singer Cassandra Wilson, in particular her 1993 album Blue Light ‘til Dawn. She is also inspired by soul music that is not limited in any way to the traditional definition of the genre (i.e. Motown or Stax Records).

== Personal life ==
Ozell is the widow of English actor Sir Patrick Stewart. They met in 2008 at Franny's restaurant in New York where Ozell was working as a waitress while Stewart was performing in Macbeth at the nearby Brooklyn Academy of Music.

In March 2013, it was reported that Stewart and Ozell were engaged and they married on September 7, 2013, beside Lake Tahoe in Nevada with actor Sir Ian McKellen officiating at the wedding ceremony. Through her marriage to Stewart, she had two stepchildren. Stewart died on October 28, 2026.

== Discography ==
=== Take It with Me (2015) ===
Take It with Me

Studio album by Sunny Ozell
- Released: July 31, 2015
- Genres: Country, jazz, Americana, blues, pop music
- Length: 37:15
- Label: Man in the Moon
- Producer: Ethan Eubanks

Take It with Me track listing
No.	Title	Length
1.	"Manhattan Island Serenade"	4:07
2.	"Family Tree"	3:55
3.	"Move Along Train"	3:23
4.	"Louisiana"	3:50
5.	"Git Gone"	2:48
6.	"Kill Zone"	3:52
7.	"Number One"	4:29
8.	"Only in the Movies"	3:11
9.	"No One Is to Blame"	3:43
10.	"Can't Help It"	3:19
11.	"Take It with Me"	4:56

=== Overnight Lows (2020) ===
Overnight Lows

Studio album by Sunny Ozell
- Released: March 13, 2020
- Length: 41:32
- Label: Chitin

Overnight Lows track listing
No.	Title	Length
1.	"Driving Highways"	3:48
2.	"Comes and It Goes"	4:11
3.	"All That I Am"	3:06
4.	"In the Sun"	4:22
5.	"Not Afraid"	3:48
6.	"Saint Ursula"	3:51
7.	"The Garden"	4:44
8.	"Hammer and Nail"	4:44
9.	"Downstream"	4:54
10.	"Take You Down"	4:04

=== Git Gone (single) (2015) ===
"Gone Girl" single track listing
No.	Title	Length
1.	"Git Gone" (Radio Mix)	2:42
