= List of Hot Country Songs number ones of 2006 =

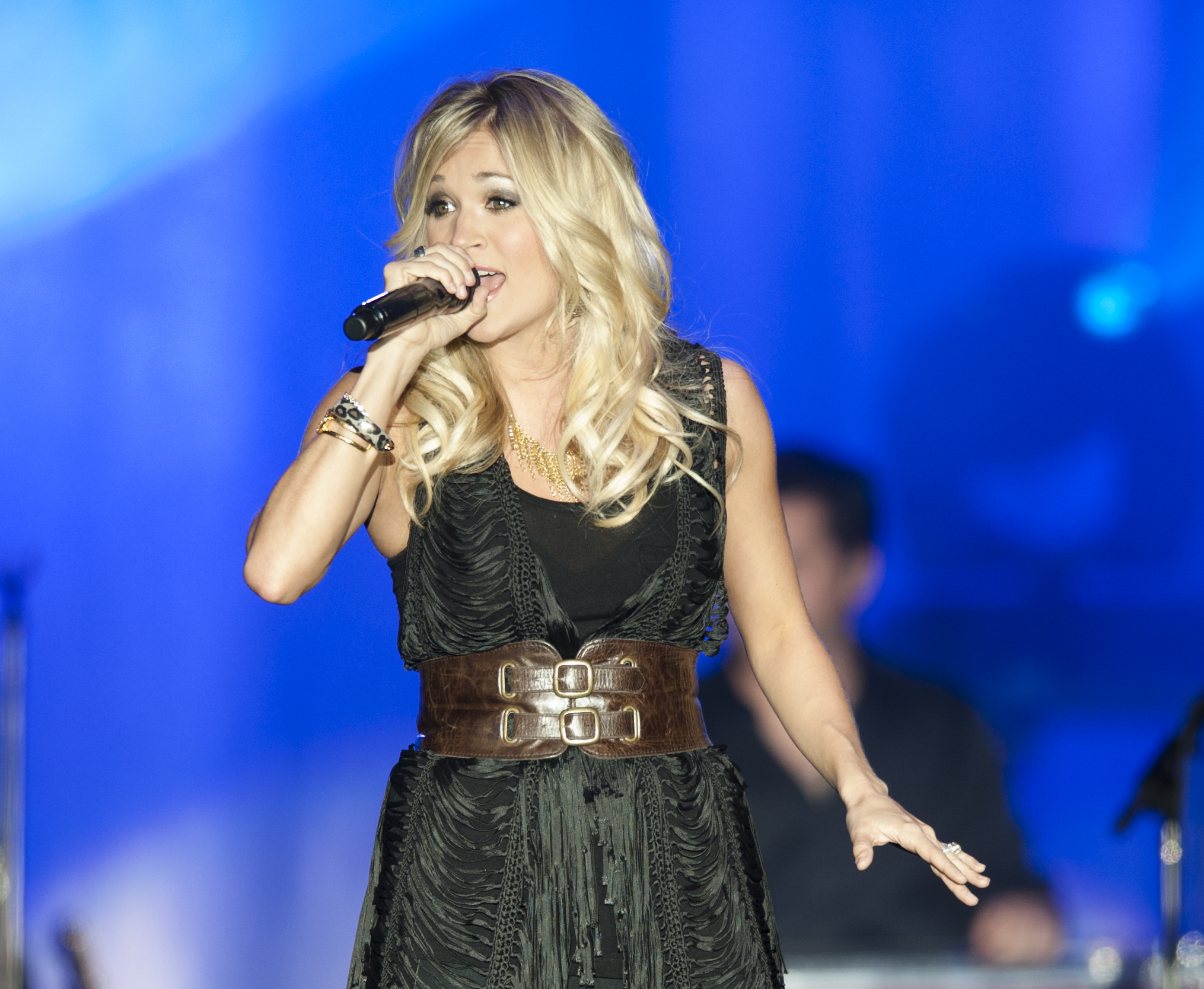
American Idol winner Carrie Underwood spent eleven weeks at the top of the chart in 2006.

Hot Country Songs is a chart that ranks the top-performing country music songs in the United States, published by Billboard magazine. In 2006, 23 different songs topped the chart in 52 issues of the magazine, based on weekly airplay data from country music radio stations compiled by Nielsen SoundScan.

The number one song at the start of the year was "Must Be Doin' Somethin' Right" by Billy Currington, which had reached number one in the issue of Billboard dated December 31, 2005, and remained at the top until the issue dated January 14 when it was replaced by "She Let Herself Go" by George Strait. This gave Strait his 40th number one, tying the record held by Conway Twitty for the highest number of Hot Country Songs number ones. Strait returned to the top spot in September with "Give It Away" to take the record outright.

Nine acts achieved their first number one in 2006. The first was Carrie Underwood, winner of the fourth season of American Idol, who had previously achieved a number-one hit on the Hot 100, but reached the top of the country chart for the first time in January with "Jesus, Take the Wheel", which spent six weeks in the top spot, the longest run of the year at number one. Later in the year, Underwood spent a further five weeks at number one with "Before He Cheats", giving her a total of eleven weeks at number one in the year, the most of any act. Other artists to achieve the feat of a debut number one in 2006 included Josh Turner, Jack Ingram, Jason Aldean, Rodney Atkins, The Wreckers, and Heartland. Veteran rock band Bon Jovi scored its first ever country hit and went all the way to number one after releasing a country version of its song "Who Says You Can't Go Home" featuring vocalist Jennifer Nettles. In December, the band Sugarland, of which Nettles is a member, gained its own debut number one with "Want To", which was the final number one of the year.

== Chart history ==
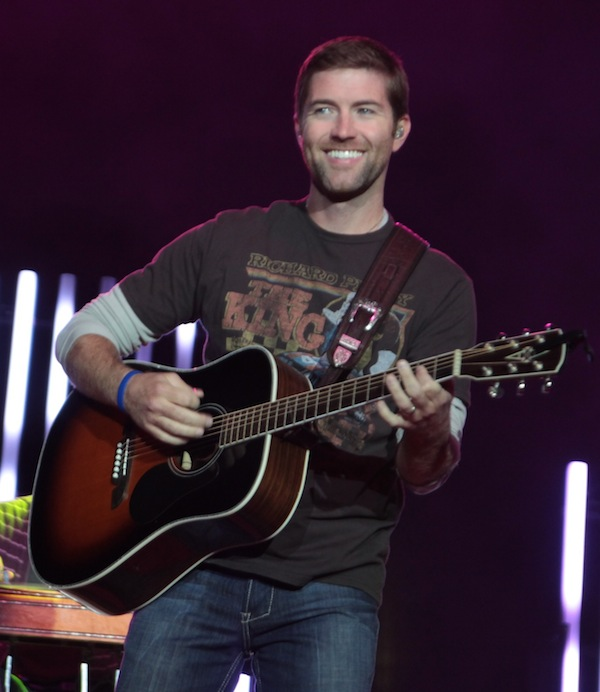
Josh Turner topped the chart for the first time in March.

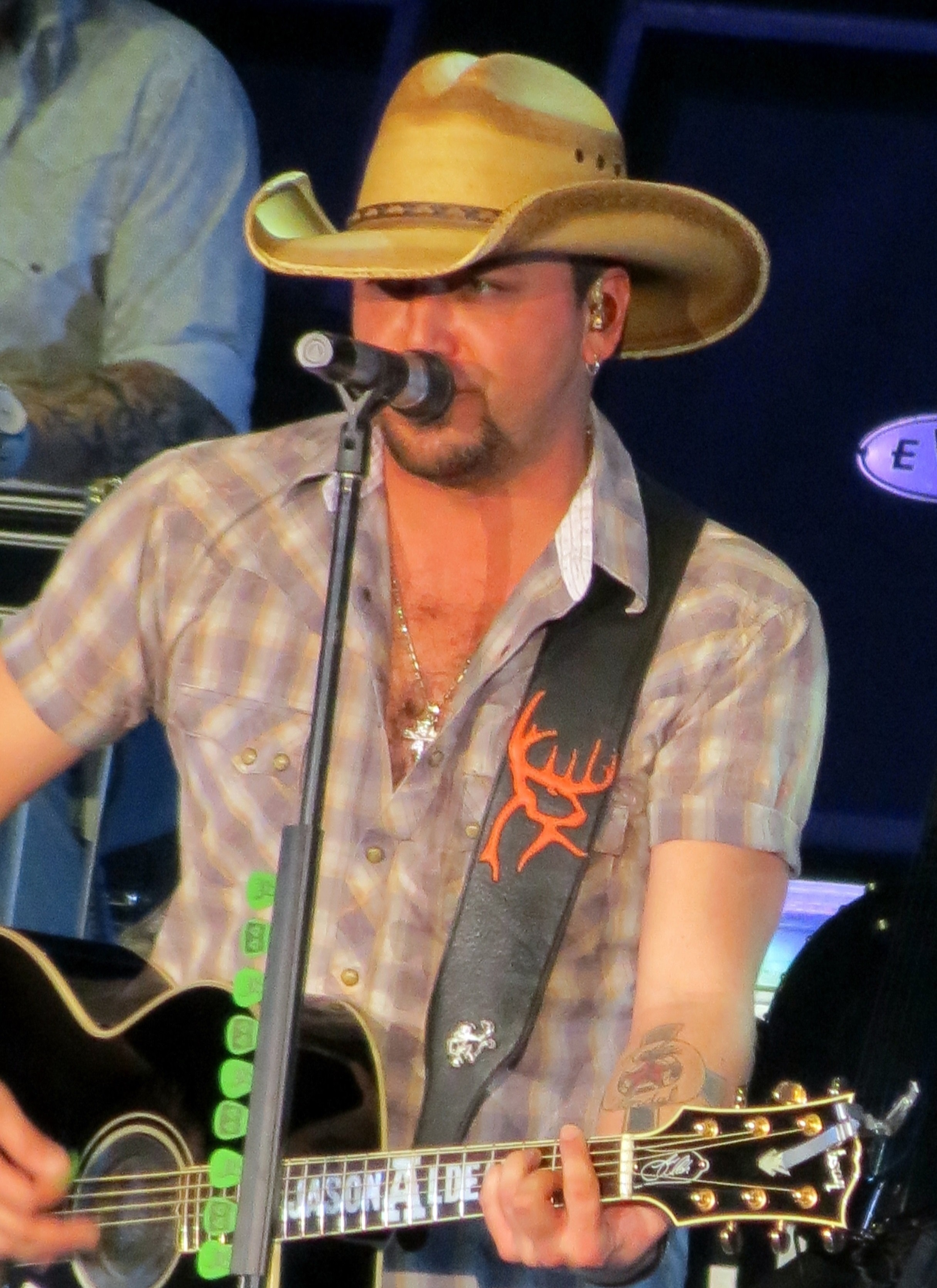
Jason Aldean was another first-time chart-topper in May.

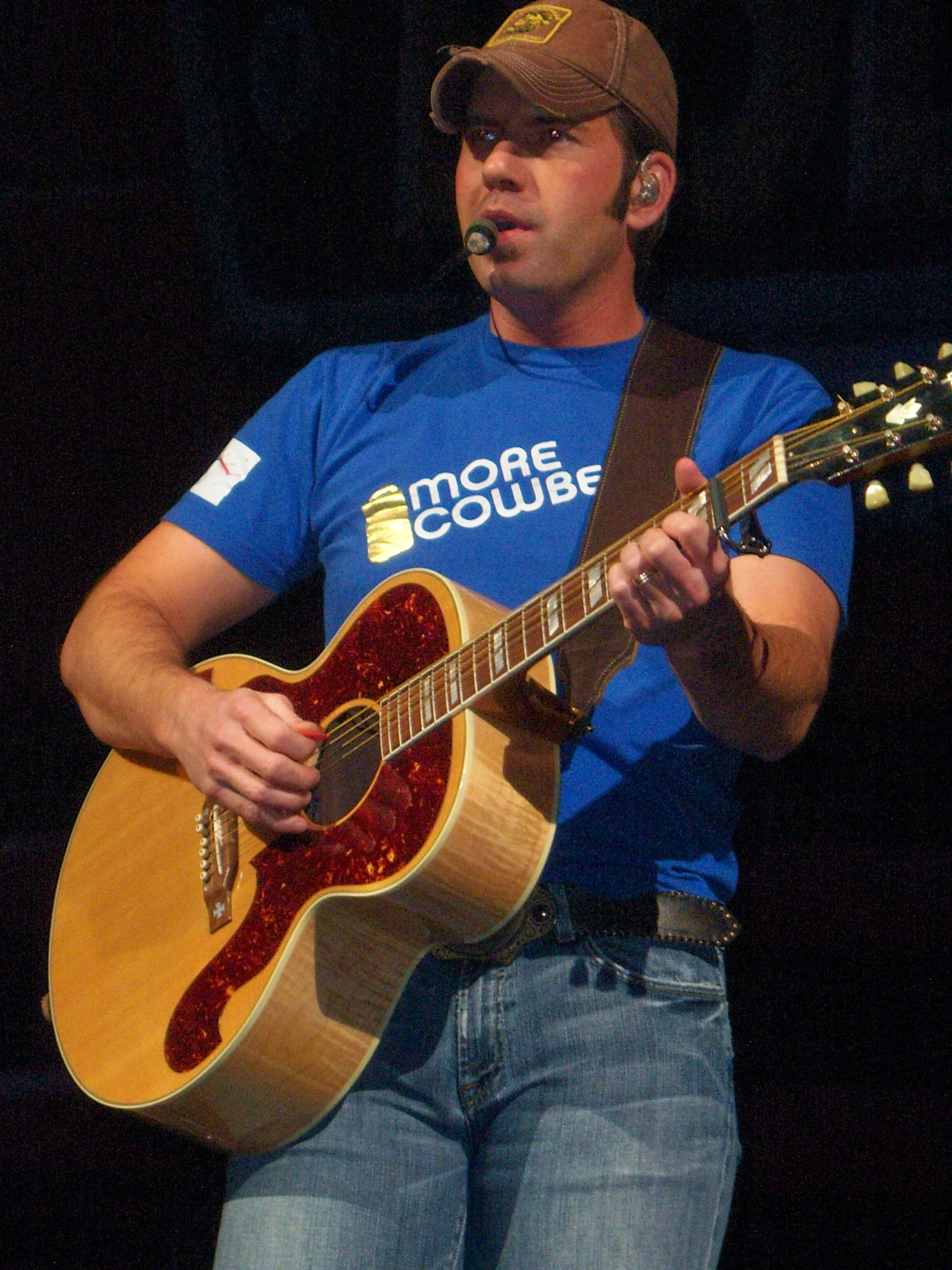
Rodney Atkins got to number one for the first time in August.

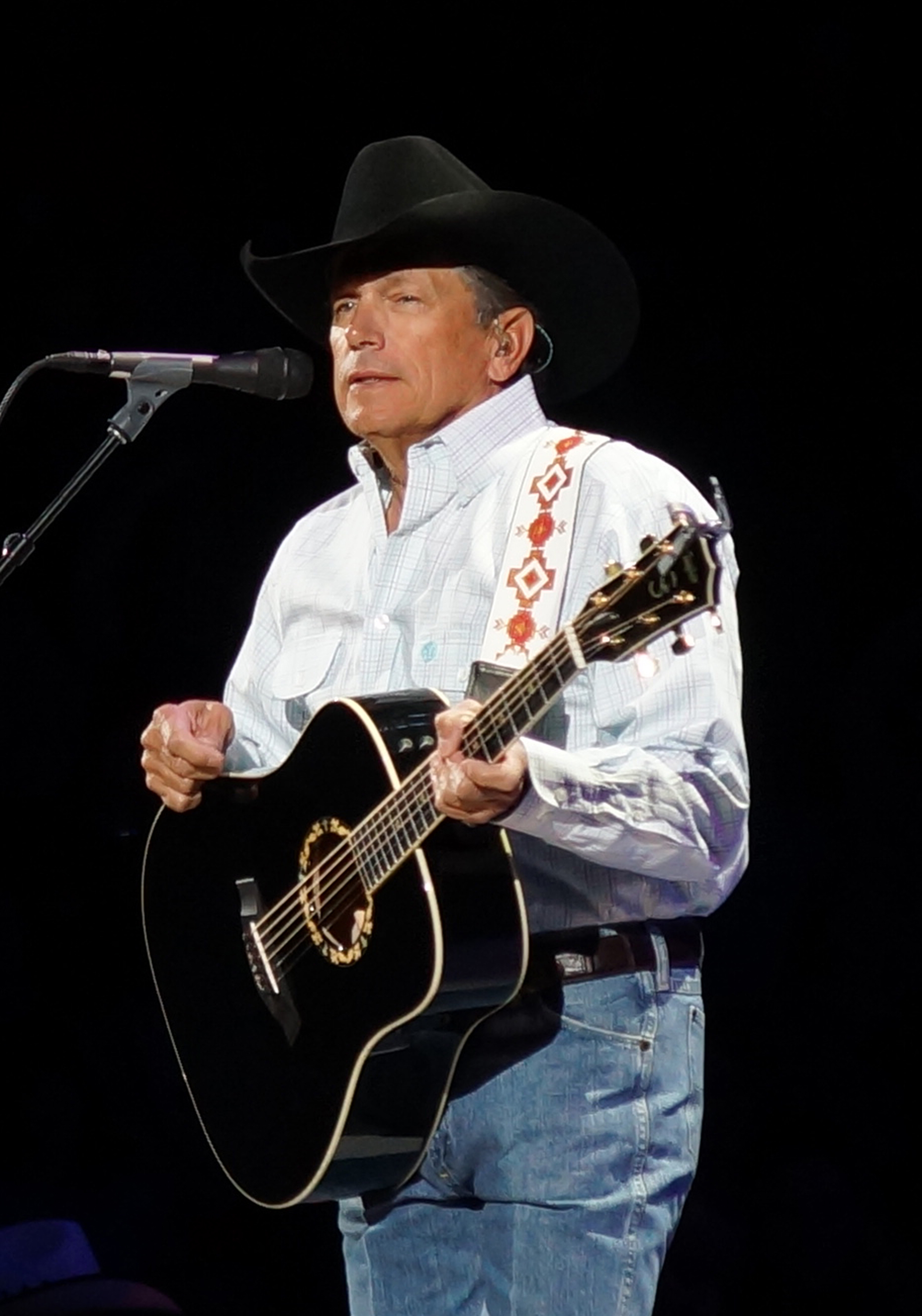
George Strait broke the record for the most Hot Country Songs number ones.

Issue date	Title	Artist(s)	Ref.
January 7	"Must Be Doin' Somethin' Right"	Billy Currington	
January 14	"She Let Herself Go"	George Strait	
January 21	"Jesus, Take the Wheel"	Carrie Underwood	
January 28	"Jesus, Take the Wheel"	Carrie Underwood	
February 4	"Jesus, Take the Wheel"	Carrie Underwood	
February 11	"Jesus, Take the Wheel"	Carrie Underwood	
February 18	"Jesus, Take the Wheel"	Carrie Underwood	
February 25	"Jesus, Take the Wheel"	Carrie Underwood	
March 4	"When I Get Where I'm Going"	Brad Paisley featuring Dolly Parton	
March 11	"Your Man"	Josh Turner	
March 18	"Living in Fast Forward"	Kenny Chesney	
March 25	"Living in Fast Forward"	Kenny Chesney	
April 1	"Living in Fast Forward"	Kenny Chesney	
April 8	"What Hurts the Most"	Rascal Flatts	
April 15	"What Hurts the Most"	Rascal Flatts	
April 22	"What Hurts the Most"	Rascal Flatts	
April 29	"What Hurts the Most"	Rascal Flatts	
May 6	"Who Says You Can't Go Home"	Bon Jovi duet with Jennifer Nettles	
May 13	"Who Says You Can't Go Home"	Bon Jovi duet with Jennifer Nettles	
May 20	"Wherever You Are"	Jack Ingram	
May 27	"Why"	Jason Aldean	
June 3	"Settle for a Slowdown"	Dierks Bentley	
June 10	"Settle for a Slowdown"	Dierks Bentley	
June 17	"Summertime"	Kenny Chesney	
June 24	"Summertime"	Kenny Chesney	
July 1	"Summertime"	Kenny Chesney	
July 8	"Summertime"	Kenny Chesney	
July 15	"Summertime"	Kenny Chesney	
July 22	"The World"	Brad Paisley	
July 29	"The World"	Brad Paisley	
August 5	"The World"	Brad Paisley	
August 12	"If You're Going Through Hell (Before the Devil Even Knows)"	Rodney Atkins	
August 19	"If You're Going Through Hell (Before the Devil Even Knows)"	Rodney Atkins	
August 26	"If You're Going Through Hell (Before the Devil Even Knows)"	Rodney Atkins	
September 2	"If You're Going Through Hell (Before the Devil Even Knows)"	Rodney Atkins	
September 9	"Leave the Pieces"	The Wreckers	
September 16	"Leave the Pieces"	The Wreckers	
September 23	"Brand New Girlfriend"	Steve Holy	
September 30	"Give It Away"	George Strait	
October 7	"Give It Away"	George Strait	
October 14	"Would You Go with Me"	Josh Turner	
October 21	"Would You Go with Me"	Josh Turner	
October 28	"I Loved Her First"	Heartland	
November 4	"Every Mile a Memory"	Dierks Bentley	
November 11	"Before He Cheats"	Carrie Underwood	
November 18	"Before He Cheats"	Carrie Underwood	
November 25	"Before He Cheats"	Carrie Underwood	
December 2	"Before He Cheats"	Carrie Underwood	
December 9	"Before He Cheats"	Carrie Underwood	
December 16	"My Wish"	Rascal Flatts	
December 23	"Want To"	Sugarland	
December 30	"Want To"	Sugarland	

== See also ==
- 2006 in music
- List of artists who reached number one on the U.S. country chart
