= Just Might Have Her Radio On =

Single by Trent Tomlinson

from the album Country Is My Rock
- Released: March 26, 2007
- Genre: Country
- Length: 3:39
- Label: Lyric Street
- Songwriters: Trent Tomlinson; Ashe Underwood
- Producers: "Hillbilly"; Leigh Reynolds; Trent Tomlinson

Trent Tomlinson singles chronology
"One Wing in the Fire" (2006)	"Just Might Have Her Radio On" (2007)	"That's How It Still Oughta Be" (2009)

"Just Might Have Her Radio On" is a song recorded by American country music artist Trent Tomlinson. It was released in March 2007 as the third single from his debut album Country Is My Rock. Tomlinson co-wrote the song with Ashe Underwood.

== Critical reception ==
Kevin John Coyne of Country Universe gave the song a B+ grade, writing that "Tomlinson sounds great delivering it and it’s as authentically country as anything you might actually hear on the radio these days."

== Music video ==
The music video was directed by Steve Cook and premiered in December 2007.

== Chart performance ==
The song debuted at number 52 on the U.S. Billboard Hot Country Songs chart for the week of April 7, 2007.

Chart (2007)	Peak position
US Hot Country Songs (Billboard)	21
US Bubbling Under Hot 100 (Billboard)	14
