= Me and God =

Single by Josh Turner

from the album Your Man
- Released: November 13, 2006
- Genre: Country, Southern gospel, bluegrass
- Length: 3:01
- Label: MCA Nashville
- Songwriter: Josh Turner
- Producer: Frank Rogers

Josh Turner singles chronology
"Would You Go with Me" (2006)	"Me and God" (2006)	"Firecracker" (2007)

"Me and God" is a song written and recorded by American country music artist Josh Turner, recorded as a duet with Ralph Stanley, with backing vocals from Marty Roe, Gene Johnson, and Dana Williams of Diamond Rio. It was released in November 2006 as the third single from his album Your Man. The song was nominated for a 2007 Academy of Country Music award for Vocal Event of the Year.

== Chart performance ==
"Me and God" debuted at number 54 on the U.S. Billboard Hot Country Songs chart for the week of November 25, 2006.

Chart (2006–2007)	Peak position
US Hot Country Songs (Billboard)	16
US Billboard Hot 100	98

== Certifications ==
Region	Certification	Certified units/sales
United States (RIAA)	Gold	500,000^{‡}
^{‡} Sales+streaming figures based on certification alone.
