= Somewhere Down in Texas =

Studio album by George Strait
- Released: June 28, 2005
- Recorded: 2004–05
- Studios: Ocean Way; Blackbird; Loud Recording; Emerald Sound; Starstruck; The Tracking Room; (Nashville, Tennessee)
- Genre: Neotraditional country
- Length: 39:44
- Label: MCA Nashville
- Producers: Tony Brown; George Strait

George Strait chronology
50 Number Ones (2004)	Somewhere Down in Texas (2005)	It Just Comes Natural (2006)

Singles from Somewhere Down in Texas
- 1. "You'll Be There" Released: March 28, 2005; 2. "She Let Herself Go" Released: September 6, 2005; 3. "The Seashores of Old Mexico" Released: February 13, 2006

Professional ratings
Aggregate scores
Source	Rating
Metacritic	(68/100)
Review scores
Source	Rating
About.com	5/5 stars
Allmusic	4/5 stars
The Austin Chronicle	2/5 stars
Chicago Tribune	(positive)
Entertainment Weekly	B+
The New York Times	(average)
People	3.5/4 stars
Plugged In (publication)	(positive)
Robert Christgau	(choice cut)
Stylus Magazine	D+

Somewhere Down in Texas is the twenty-third studio album by American country music singer George Strait. This album was released on June 28, 2005, on the MCA Nashville Records label. This album was certified platinum and peaked at #1 on the Billboard 200. Singles released from it were, in order: "You'll Be There", which peaked at #4 on Hot Country Songs; "She Let Herself Go", which became Strait's 40th Billboard Number One hit on the country charts; and a cover of Merle Haggard's "The Seashores of Old Mexico", which peaked at #11. "Texas" also charted at #35 on Hot Country Songs from unsolicited airplay.

The album's titled track was played in a video retrospective to former professional wrestler "Stone Cold" Steve Austin that appeared as the last chapter of the same name in the DVD, "Stone Cold" Steve Austin: The Bottom Line on the Most Popular Superstar of All Time.

In 2005, the Country Music Association named "Good News, Bad News" the musical event of the year.

== Track listing ==
No.	Title	Writer(s)	Length
1.	"If the Whole World Was a Honky Tonk"	Bryan Simpson, Ashley Gorley, Wade Kirby	4:07
2.	"Somewhere Down in Texas"	Dana Hunt Black, Tim Ryan Rouillier, Charlie Black	3:55
3.	"The Seashores of Old Mexico"	Merle Haggard	4:11
4.	"You'll Be There"	Cory Mayo	4:18
5.	"High Tone Woman"	Leslie Satcher, Rouillier	2:52
6.	"Good News, Bad News" (with Lee Ann Womack)	Dean Dillon, Dale Dodson, Lee Ann Womack	3:22
7.	"Oh, What a Perfect Day"	Monty Holmes, Buddy Brock, Jeff Silvey	3:29
8.	"Texas"	Steven Dale Jones, Phillip White	3:04
9.	"Ready for the End of the World"	Clint Daniels, Tony Martin	3:51
10.	"She Let Herself Go"	Dillon, Kerry Kurt Phillips	3:18
11.	"By the Light of a Burning Bridge"	Walt Aldridge, Michael White	3:17

== Personnel ==
- George Strait – lead vocals, backing vocals (3)
- Steve Nathan – Hammond B3 organ (1, 2, 5, 8–11), Wurlitzer electric piano (3), acoustic piano (7)
- Matt Rollings – acoustic piano (1–6, 8, 10, 11), synthesizers (7)
- Steve Gibson – acoustic guitar (1, 8, 10, 11), electric guitar (2–9)
- Brent Mason – electric guitar (1, 2, 4, 5, 7, 8, 10, 11), nylon string guitar (3), acoustic guitar (6)
- Bryan Sutton – acoustic guitar (1–5, 7–11), gut-string guitar (6)
- Paul Franklin – steel guitar
- Stuart Duncan – fiddle (1, 2, 3, 5–11), mandolin (3, 4)
- Glenn Worf – bass guitar (1, 2, 4, 6–11), upright bass (5)
- Michael Rhodes – bass guitar (3)
- Eddie Bayers – drums
- Casey Wood – percussion (4)
- The Nashville String Machine – strings (2, 3, 4, 6)
- Bergen White – string arrangements and conductor (2, 3, 4, 6)
- Carl Gorodetzky – string contractor (2, 3, 4, 6)
- Wes Hightower – backing vocals (1, 2, 5, 7–11)
- Marty Slayton – backing vocals (1, 2, 5, 7–11)
- Jaime Babbitt – backing vocals (4)
- Bob Bailey – backing vocals (4)
- Lisa Cochran – backing vocals (4)
- Vicki Hampton – backing vocals (4)
- Chris Rodriguez – backing vocals (4)
- Lee Ann Womack – lead vocals (6)

=== Production ===
- Tony Brown – producer
- George Strait – producer, additional recording (3)
- Chuck Ainlay – recording, additional recording (2)
- Kyle Lehning – mixing, additional recording (3, 4, 6)
- Leslie Richter – recording assistant
- Steve Marcantonio – additional recording
- Rich Hanson – additional recording (1), mix assistant
- Bob Bullock – additional recording (4, 5, 6, 9, 10, 11)
- Richie Biggs – additional recording (7, 8)
- Casey Wood – additional recording assistant (3, 6), additional recording (4), mix assistant
- Todd Tidwell – additional recording assistant (4, 5, 6, 9, 10, 11)
- Robert Hadley – mastering
- Doug Sax – mastering
- The Mastering Lab (Hollywood, California) – mastering location
- Amy Russell – production coordinator
- Craig Allen – art direction, design
- Tony Baker – photography
- Terry Calonge – photography
- Peter Nash – photography
- Mark Tucker – photography
- Erv Woolsey – management

== Charts ==
=== Weekly charts ===
Chart (2005)	Peak position
US Billboard 200	1
US Top Country Albums (Billboard)	1

=== Year-end charts ===
Chart (2005)	Position
US Billboard 200	102
US Top Country Albums (Billboard)	16
Chart (2006)	Position
US Top Country Albums (Billboard)	45

== Certifications ==
Certifications for Somewhere Down in Texas
Region	Certification	Certified units/sales
United States (RIAA)	Platinum	1,000,000^{^}
^{^} Shipments figures based on certification alone.
