= I Don't (Danielle Peck song) =

Single by Danielle Peck

from the album Danielle Peck
- Released: September 26, 2005
- Genre: Country
- Length: 3:29
- Label: Big Machine
- Songwriter(s): Danielle Peck, Burton Banks Collins, Clay Mills
- Producer(s): Byron Gallimore

Danielle Peck singles chronology
"I Don't" (2005)	"Findin' a Good Man" (2006)

"I Don't" is a debut song co-written and recorded by American country music artist Danielle Peck. It was released in September 2005 as the first single from the album Danielle Peck. The song reached #28 on the Billboard Hot Country Songs chart. The song was written by Peck, Burton Banks Collins and Clay Mills.

== Chart performance ==
Chart (2005–2006)	Peak position
US Hot Country Songs (Billboard)	28
