= The Little Willies (album) =

Studio album by The Little Willies
- Released: March 7, 2006
- Recorded: October 5–8, 2005
- Genre: Rock, country
- Length: 43:25
- Label: Milking Bull, Parlophone
- Producer: Lee Alexander

The Little Willies chronology
The Little Willies (2006)	For the Good Times (2012)

Professional ratings
Review scores
Source	Rating
AllMusic	4/5 stars
Rolling Stone	3/5 stars

The Little Willies is the self-titled debut album by The Little Willies. The album was released after band member Norah Jones had achieved international stardom as a solo artist.

The album features covers of songs by Hank Williams ("I’ll Never Get Out"), Willie Nelson ("Gotta Get Drunk" and "Night Life"), Fred Rose ("Roly Poly"), Townes Van Zandt ("No Place to Fall") and Kris Kristofferson ("Best of All Possible Worlds"). Fusing cover material with a few of their own original compositions, the band delivers what a review by John Metzger describes as "an affable set that occasionally strikes pure gold."

== Track listing ==
No.	Title	Writer(s)	Length
1.	"Roly Poly"	Fred Rose	2:34
2.	"I'll Never Get Out of This World Alive"	Fred Rose, Hank Williams	3:22
3.	"Love Me"	Jerry Leiber, Mike Stoller	3:51
4.	"It's Not You It's Me"	Richard Julian, Ashley Monroe	2:44
5.	"Best of All Possible Worlds"	Kris Kristofferson	3:11
6.	"No Place to Fall"	Townes Van Zandt	4:01
7.	"Roll On"	Lee Alexander	3:07
8.	"I Gotta Get Drunk"	Willie Nelson	2:28
9.	"Streets of Baltimore"	Tompall Glaser, Harlan Howard	3:06
10.	"Easy as the Rain"	Richard Julian, Jim Campilongo	3:15
11.	"Tennessee Stud"	Jimmy Driftwood	3:49
12.	"Night Life"	Willie Nelson, Walter M. Breeland, Paul F. Buskirk	3:47
13.	"Lou Reed"	Lee Alexander, Richard Julian, Norah Jones	4:17
Total length:			43:25

== Charts ==
=== Weekly charts ===
Chart (2006)	Peak position
Australian Albums (ARIA)	95
Austrian Albums (Ö3 Austria)	18
Belgian Albums (Ultratop Flanders)	19
Belgian Albums (Ultratop Wallonia)	71
Dutch Albums (Album Top 100)	17
Finnish Albums (Suomen virallinen lista)	40
French Albums (SNEP)	40
German Albums (Offizielle Top 100)	53
Italian Albums (FIMI)	41
New Zealand Albums (RMNZ)	37
Norwegian Albums (VG-lista)	22
Scottish Albums (OCC)	35
Spanish Albums (PROMUSICAE)	86
Swedish Albums (Sverigetopplistan)	56
Swiss Albums (Schweizer Hitparade)	25
UK Albums (OCC)	41
US Billboard 200	48
US Top Country Albums (Billboard)	10

=== Year-end charts ===
Chart (2006)	Position
US Top Country Albums (Billboard)	67
