= The Living Room =

Former music venue in New York City

- "Showcasing New York City’s singer/songwriter, alt-country, and rock"
- Interactive map of The Living Room
- Location: 134 Metropolitan Avenue; Brooklyn, New York
- Owner: Steve Rosenthal and Jennifer Gilson
- Capacity: 180
- Type: Music venue
- Events: acoustic rock, alternative rock, Alternative country, electronic, folk, indie, rock

Construction
- Opened: 1988
- Closed: 2015

Website
- www.livingroomny.com

The Living Room was a music venue on Metropolitan Avenue in the Williamsburg neighborhood of Brooklyn, which was originally established on Stanton Street of the Lower East Side in Manhattan, New York City in 1988. The Living Room was co-owned by Steve Rosenthal and Jennifer Gilson. The Living Room has showcased some of the best of New York City’s singer/songwriter, alt-country, and rock. It moved to Brooklyn in 2015 before closing in December of the same year.

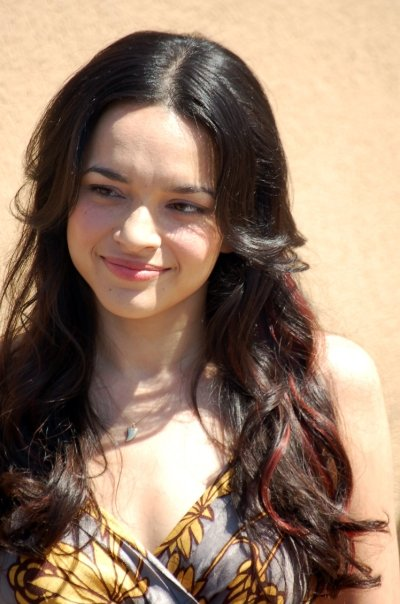
Norah Jones performed at the 10th anniversary celebration of the Living Room.

This music venue has been called "an incubator of talent," and has been described as "a much mellower and tidier successor to CBGB." Some considered The Living Room as The Bottom Line of the "small bankroll" live rock venues. Other comparable venues include The Saint in Asbury Park, New Jersey, and The Cellar Door in Georgetown, Washington, D.C. The Living Room's line-up featured four or five singer-songwriters a night, yet the club did not typically charge a cover. It did have a one drink minimum and a recommended $5 donation for the bands.

Some of The Living Room's sessions were recorded. In 2002 a CD, The Living Room - Live in NYC - Vol.1 (Stanton St. Records), featuring live recordings from The Living Room was released. The CD included performances by Norah Jones, Jesse Harris, Malcolm Holcombe, Rachel Loshak, and Chris Moore.

The Living Room's patrons and performers have been characterized as a "close-knit family..." Those who have performed there include Joseph Arthur, Colbie Caillat, Minnie Driver, David Ford, Jesse Harris, Beatie Wolfe, Ari Hest, Norah Jones, Jim Campilongo, Jesse Malin, Madeleine Peyroux, Jason Reeves, Ron Sexsmith, The Little Willies, Ane Brun, The Shells, Chris Thile, Martha Wainwright and Lizzy Grant (now known as Lana Del Rey).

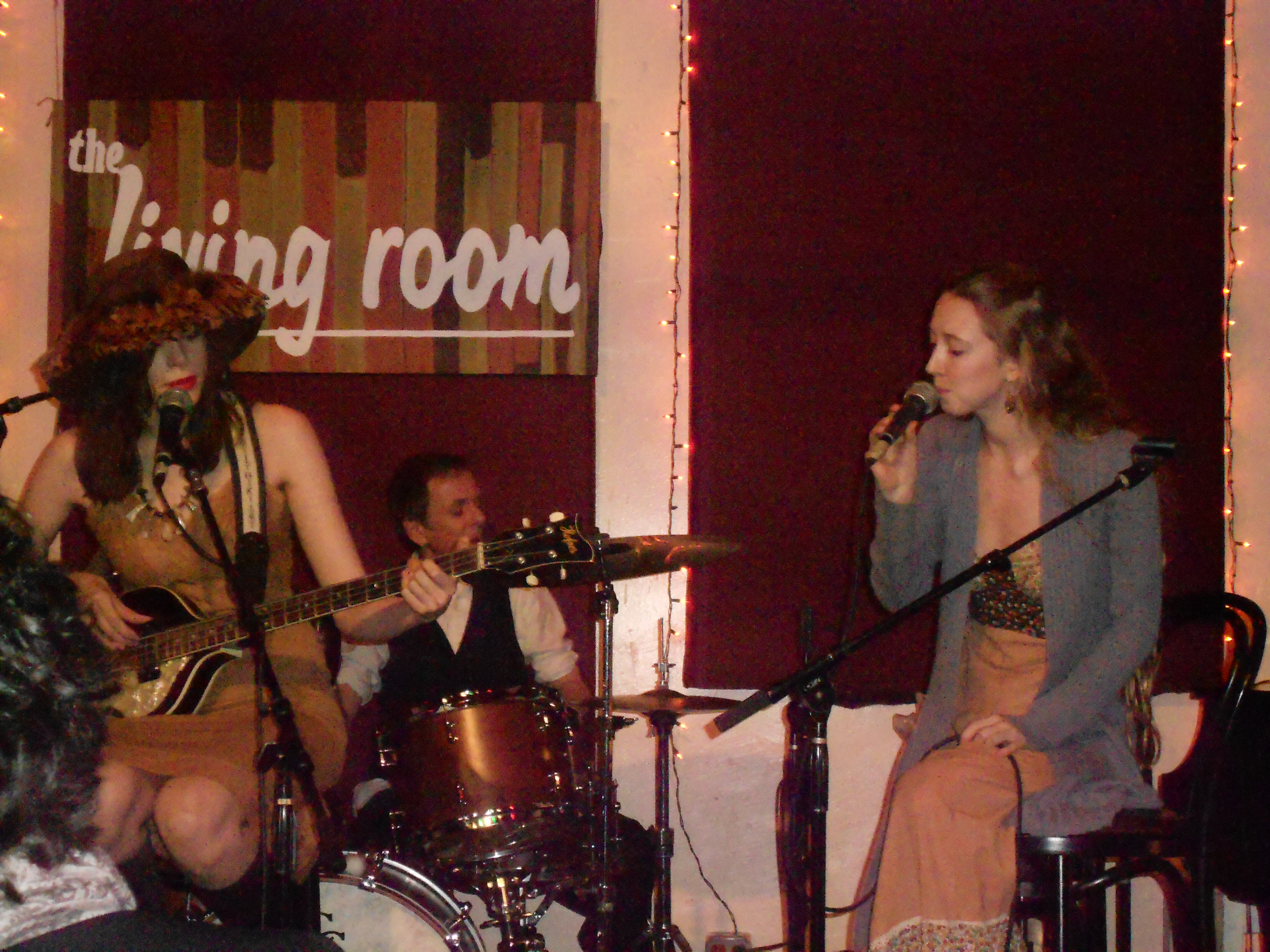
Kemp Muhl and Eden Rice Performing at The Living Room

Additionally, The Living Room had a smaller more intimate upstairs area known as Googies Lounge. Live artists used to perform every night of the week.

== History ==
Gilson, who is married to Rosenthal, first opened The Living Room in a former fried chicken joint a few blocks from the latter location. In 2003, the club moved from Stanton Street to its second location on Ludlow Street, which had a main music room, front bar area, and upstairs lounge. The venue closed on December 21, 2015.
