= You'll Be There =

Single by George Strait

from the album Somewhere Down in Texas
- Released: March 28, 2005
- Genre: Country
- Length: 4:18
- Label: MCA Nashville
- Songwriter: Cory Mayo
- Producers: Tony Brown, George Strait

George Strait singles chronology
| "I Hate Everything" (2004) | "You'll Be There" (2005) | "She Let Herself Go" (2005) |

"You'll Be There" is a song written by Cory Mayo and recorded by American country music singer George Strait. It was released in March 2005 as the lead single from the album, Somewhere Down in Texas. It peaked at number 4 on the U.S. Billboard Hot Country Singles & Tracks chart and number 54 on the U.S. Billboard Hot 100 chart.

== Critical reception ==
In his review of the album, Ray Waddell of Billboard called it "the kind of languid big-picture [ballad] that he just kills". An uncredited review in the Plainview Daily Herald called the song "much more ambitious than the usual George Strait tune". Greg Crawford of Knight Ridder News Service wrote that it had "moving but never maudlin lyrics" and "is the clear standout" of the album.

== Chart positions ==
"You'll Be There" debuted at number 30 on the U.S. Billboard Hot Country Songs for the week of April 9, 2005.

| Chart (2005) | Peak position |
|---|---|
| Canada Country (Radio & Records) | 5 |
| US Hot Country Songs (Billboard) | 4 |
| US Billboard Hot 100 | 54 |

=== Year-end charts ===
| Chart (2005) | Position |
|---|---|
| US Country Songs (Billboard) | 20 |
