= Country Is My Rock =

Studio album by Trent Tomlinson
- Released: March 7, 2006
- Genre: Country
- Length: 39:29
- Label: Lyric Street
- Producers: "Hillbilly", Leigh Reynolds, Trent Tomlinson

Singles from Country Is My Rock
- 1. "Drunker Than Me" Released: October 24, 2005; 2. "One Wing in the Fire" Released: June 5, 2006; 3. "Just Might Have Her Radio On" Released: March 26, 2007

Professional ratings
Review scores
Source	Rating
Allmusic	4.5/5 stars
Country Standard Time	

Country Is My Rock is the debut studio album of American country music artist Trent Tomlinson. It was released on March 7, 2006 (see 2006 in country music) on Lyric Street Records. The album produced three chart singles on the Billboard Hot Country Songs charts between 2005 and 2007: "Drunker Than Me" (No. 19), "One Wing in the Fire" (No. 11), and "Just Might Have Her Radio On" (No. 21). Tomlinson co-produced the album with Leigh Reynolds and "Hillbilly".

== Track listing ==
No.	Title	Writer(s)	Length
1.	"Country Is My Rock"	Trent Tomlinson, Tony Ramey	3:53
2.	"Cheatin' on My Honky-Tonk"	Tomlinson, Ashe Underwood	3:29
3.	"Angels Like Her"	Tomlinson, Arlos Smith, Aaron Barker	4:02
4.	"Hey Batter Batter"	Tomlinson, Underwood	3:55
5.	"Just Might Have Her Radio On"	Tomlinson, Underwood	3:39
6.	"The Next Time"	Tomlinson, Underwood	2:51
7.	"A Good Run"	Tomlinson, Barker, Anthony Smith	3:51
8.	"Drunker Than Me"	Tomlinson, Underwood	3:11
9.	"The Bottle"	Tomlinson, Mark Kerr, Dennis Knutson	3:55
10.	"I Was Gonna Leave Tomorrow Anyway"	Tomlinson, Kris Bergsnes	2:52
11.	"One Wing in the Fire"	Tomlinson, Bobby Pinson	3:53

== Personnel ==
- Mike Brignardello – bass guitar
- Jim "Moose" Brown – keyboards
- Chad Cromwell – drums
- Eric Darken – percussion
- Chip Davis – background vocals
- Paul Franklin – pedal steel guitar
- Mike "Frog" Griffith – production coordinator
- Rob Hajacos – fiddle
- Wes Hightower – background vocals
- "Hillbilly" – producer
- Dennis Holt – drums
- Troy Lancaster – electric guitar
- Greg Lawrence – assistant producer
- Chris Leuzinger – acoustic guitar
- Mike Logan – mixer
- B. James Lowry – acoustic guitar
- Brent Mason – electric guitar
- Pat McGrath – acoustic guitar
- Greg Morrow – drums
- Gordon Mote – keyboards
- Russ Pahl – lap steel guitar
- Sang Park – assistant producer
- Leigh Reynolds – electric guitar, producer
- Michael Rhodes – bass guitar
- Michael Rojas – keyboards
- Marty Slayton – background vocals
- Jimmie Lee Sloas – bass guitar
- Trent Tomlinson – Dobro (track 1), lead vocals (all tracks), producer
- Biff Watson – acoustic guitar

== Chart performance ==
=== Weekly charts ===
Chart (2006)	Peak position
US Billboard 200	95
US Top Country Albums (Billboard)	20

=== Year-end charts ===
Chart (2007)	Position
US Top Country Albums (Billboard)	62

=== Singles ===
Year	Single	Peak chart positions	
Year	Single	US Country	US
2005	"Drunker Than Me"	19	103
2006	"One Wing in the Fire"	11	90
2007	"Just Might Have Her Radio On"	21	114
