= Isn't That Everything =

Single by Danielle Peck

from the album Danielle Peck
- Released: October 23, 2006
- Genre: Country
- Length: 3:01
- Label: Big Machine
- Songwriter(s): Danielle Peck, Blair Daly, Tommy Lee James
- Producer(s): Tommy Lee James

Danielle Peck singles chronology
"Findin' a Good Man" (2006)	"Isn't That Everything" (2006)	"Bad for Me" (2007)

"Isn't That Everything" is song co-written and recorded by American country music artist Danielle Peck. It was released in October 2006 as the third single from the album Danielle Peck. The song reached #30 on the Billboard Hot Country Songs chart. The song was written by Peck, Blair Daly and Tommy Lee James.

== Chart performance ==
Chart (2006–2007)	Peak position
US Hot Country Songs (Billboard)	30
