= One Wing in the Fire =

Single by Trent Tomlinson

from the album Country Is My Rock
- Released: May 30, 2006
- Recorded: 2005
- Genre: Country
- Length: 3:52
- Label: Lyric Street
- Songwriters: Trent Tomlinson; Bobby Pinson
- Producers: "Hillbilly"; Leigh Reynolds; Trent Tomlinson

Trent Tomlinson singles chronology
"Drunker Than Me" (2005)	"One Wing in the Fire" (2006)	"Just Might Have Her Radio On" (2007)

"One Wing in the Fire" is a song co-written and recorded by American country music artist Trent Tomlinson. It is a ballad dedicated to Tomlinson's father, Don. The song was released in May 2006 as the second single from Tomlinson's debut album Country Is My Rock, and reached a peak of number 11 on the U.S. Billboard Hot Country Songs charts in early 2007. Tomlinson wrote the song with Bobby Pinson.

== Content ==
The song's lyrics tell of the narrator's father's various character flaws ("Daddy's been a back-row Baptist / With his share of front-row sin"), but also of the good deeds that his father has done for him ("Daddy's always been there for me / From T-ball to touchdowns"). In the song, the narrator asks that God will forgive his errant father, who "lives a little left of living right", but is still a good person despite his flaws — in other words, "an angel with no halo / And one wing in the fire".

Tomlinson has also stated that he receives e-mails from fans regarding the song. He stated that the song "never gets old... because it means so much to so many people". He has also stated that his father has "been very influential in what I do, the good and the bad. Thank God he understands that and doesn't get mad at me when I write about the bad."

The song is in the key of E-flat major, with a moderate tempo and a vocal range of two octaves, spanning E♭_{3}-E♭_{5}.

== Music video ==
The music video was directed by Shaun Silva and premiered on July 20, 2006.

== Chart performance ==
Chart (2006–2007)	Peak position
Canada Country (Billboard)	42
US Hot Country Songs (Billboard)	11
US Billboard Hot 100	90
