= Rockie Lynne (album) =

Studio album by Rockie Lynne
- Released: May 2, 2006
- Genre: Country
- Label: Universal South
- Producer: Blake Chancey, Tony Brown, Kevin Law

Rockie Lynne chronology
Rockie Lynne (2006)	Twilight (2007)

Singles from Rockie Lynne
- 1. "More" Released: November 6, 2006

Professional ratings
Review scores
Source	Rating
Allmusic	link
Country Standard Time	link

Rockie Lynne is the debut studio album by American country music singer Rockie Lynne. The album was released on May 2, 2006 (see 2006 in country music) via Universal South Records. It includes three chart singles in "Lipstick", "Do We Still" and "More", all of which charted on the Billboard country charts. It is his only major-label album.

== Content ==
Lynne wrote or co-wrote all 12 tracks on the album. "Lipstick" was released as the album's lead single. It spent 21 weeks on the Billboard Hot Country Songs chart, peaking at #29 on the chart week of March 18, 2006. The album produced two further singles in "Do We Still" and "More", though neither reached the top 40 of the charts.

== Track listing ==
No.	Title	Writer(s)	Length
1.	"Lipstick"	Rockie Lynne, Mark Prentice	4:24
2.	"The Only Reason"	Lynne, Prentice, Monty Powell	4:49
3.	"More"	Lynne, Dennis Morgan	3:54
4.	"Super Country Cowboy"	Lynne, Kevin Douglas, Allen Sostrin	3:40
5.	"That's Where Songs Come From"	Lynne, Richard Leigh, Sharon Vaughn	3:28
6.	"Do We Still"	Lynne, Rob Crosby, Will Rambeaux	3:57
7.	"Big Time in a Small Town"	Lynne, Douglas, Sostrin	2:54
8.	"Don't Make This Easy on Me"	Lynne, Mitzi Dawn, Kim Tribble	3:39
9.	"Love Me Like You're Gonna Lose Me"	Lynne	3:34
10.	"Every Man's Got a Mountain"	Lynne, Kostas, Sostrin	3:40
11.	"Holding Back the Ocean"	Lynne, Douglas, Sostrin	3:29
12.	"Red, White and Blue"	Lynne	3:37

== Personnel ==
As listed in liner notes.

- Lisa Cochran – background vocals (tracks 1, 3, 4, 7)
- Perry Coleman – background vocals (tracks 1–4, 7, 11)
- J. T. Corenflos – electric guitar (tracks 1, 3, 4, 7, 9)
- Eric Darken – percussion (tracks 2, 11, 12)
- Thom Flora – background vocals (tracks 10, 12)
- Paul Franklin – lap steel guitar (track 2), pedal steel guitar (tracks 10–12)
- Vicki Hampton – background vocals (tracks 5, 6, 8)
- Aubrey Haynie – fiddle (tracks 2, 10–12), mandolin (tracks 10, 11)
- Wes Hightower – background vocals (tracks 1, 5, 6, 8, 9)
- Chris Leuzinger – electric guitar (tracks 2, 10–12)
- Rockie Lynne – electric guitar (tracks 1–10)
- Kim Parent – background vocals (tracks 4)
- George Marinelli – electric guitar (tracks 5, 6, 8)
- Terry McMillan – harmonica (track 10)
- Greg Morrow – percussion (tracks 1, 3, 4, 6, 7), drums (tracks 2–12)
- Steve Nathan – keyboards (tracks 1, 3–9, 12), Hammond B-3 organ (track 2), piano (tracks 10, 11), synthesizer (track 11)
- Mark Prentice – bass guitar (tracks 1, 3–9)
- Billy Panda – acoustic guitar (tracks 1, 3–9)
- Michael Rhodes – bass guitar (tracks 2, 10–12)
- Hank Singer – fiddle (track 9)
- Jack Solomon – electric guitar (track 9)
- Harry Stinson – background vocals (tracks 10, 12)
- James Stroud – drums (track 1)
- Robby Turner – pedal steel guitar (tracks 5, 6, 8, 9)
- Cindy Walker – background vocals (tracks 1, 2, 9, 11)
- John Willis – acoustic guitar (tracks 2, 10–12)

== Production ==
- Blake Chancey and Tony Brown (tracks 4, 5, 7–9)
- Tony Brown (tracks 2, 10–12)
- Blake Chancey, Tony Brown, Kevin Law (tracks 1, 3, 6)

== Chart performance ==
Chart (2006)	Peak position
U.S. Billboard Top Country Albums	29
U.S. Billboard 200	163
U.S. Billboard Top Heatseekers	4
