= Would You Go with Me =

Single by Josh Turner

from the album Your Man
- Released: April 24, 2006
- Genre: Country; bluegrass
- Length: 3:48
- Label: MCA Nashville
- Songwriters: Shawn Camp; John Scott Sherrill
- Producer: Frank Rogers

Josh Turner singles chronology
"Your Man" (2005)	"Would You Go with Me" (2006)	"Me and God" (2006)

"Would You Go with Me" is a song written by Shawn Camp and John Scott Sherrill, and recorded by American country music artist Josh Turner. It was released in April 2006 as the second single from his album Your Man. It is the first track on Your Man.

== Content ==
"Would You Go with Me" is written in the key of E-flat minor with a moderately fast tempo.

== Critical reception ==
It was his second number 1 country single in a row after "Your Man" peaked at the top on the Billboard Country chart in early 2006. "Would You Go with Me" spent two weeks at the top. On the Billboard Hot 100, its highest position was number 43.

Shortly after the song had peaked, Turner's performance of the song on the CMAs lead to a huge sales spike on online retailers sending the song back up the Billboard Hot 100, Hot Digital Songs, and Pop 100 charts to new peaks. In 2026, it was certified four-times Platinum by the RIAA.

=== Grammy nominations ===
In late 2006, the nominees for the 2007 Grammy Awards were announced. Turner received a nomination for Male Country Vocal Performance of the Year for "Would You Go with Me." He also earned a nomination for Country Album of the Year for Your Man.

== Music video ==
The music video for "Would You Go with Me" was shot in an abandoned farmhouse in Watertown, Tennessee using green and blue screens. Kristin Barlowe directed the video.

The video follows a boy and a girl who wander into the farmhouse as children. It shows them at different stages in their lives together in different locations all within the house using CGI.

The video starts out as two children run into an empty house. Josh begins singing in the dark house while holding a lamp. The children find a jar of sand in the house and dump it out onto the floor, transforming the room into the beach. It then shows them in various outdoor locations at different ages. At the end of the video, the boy, now an old man, returns to the beach with a chest of his wife's ashes. The little girl, played by Peter Cetera's second daughter Senna, then returns and the old man transforms into the little boy again and the two run off together. Josh is shown throughout the house and outdoor settings singing. Musicians playing the mandolin, dobro, guitar and banjo are also featured in the video.

On September 28, 2006, the music video for "Would You Go with Me" took the top spot of CMT's Top 20 Countdown, where it remained for two weeks.

== Chart performance ==
=== Weekly charts ===
Chart (2006)	Peak position
US Billboard Hot 100	43
US Hot Country Songs (Billboard)	1

Chart (2021)	Peak position
Sweden Heatseeker (Sverigetopplistan)	6

=== Year-end charts ===
Chart (2006)	Position
US Country Songs (Billboard)	6

== Certifications ==
Region	Certification	Certified units/sales
United States (RIAA)	4× Platinum	4,000,000^{‡}
^{‡} Sales+streaming figures based on certification alone.

== See also ==
- List of number-one country singles of 2006 (U.S.)
