= Danielle Peck (album) =

Studio album by Danielle Peck
- Released: June 6, 2006
- Genre: Country
- Label: Big Machine
- Producer: Byron Gallimore; Tommy Lee James; Jeremy Stover

Danielle Peck chronology
Danielle Peck (2006)	Can't Behave (2008)

Singles from Danielle Peck
- 1. "I Don't" Released: September 26, 2005; 2. "Findin' a Good Man" Released: February 27, 2006; 3. "Isn't That Everything" Released: October 23, 2006

Professional ratings
Review scores
Source	Rating
Allmusic	4/5 stars

Danielle Peck is the debut studio album by American country music singer Danielle Peck. It was released on June 6, 2006, on Big Machine Records. Three singles from this album charted on the Hot Country Songs chart between 2005 and 2007. These were "I Don't" at No. 28, "Findin' a Good Man" at No. 16, and "Isn't That Everything" at No. 30.

== Track listing ==
No.	Title	Writer(s)	Producer(s)	Length
1.	"Findin' a Good Man"	Casey Koesel, Brian Dean Maher, Jeremy Stover	Jeremy Stover	3:14
2.	"Isn't That Everything"	Blair Daly, Tommy Lee James, Danielle Peck	Tommy Lee James	3:01
3.	"Kiss You on the Mouth"	James, Autumn McEntire, Clay Mills, Peck	Tommy Lee James	3:20
4.	"Fallin' Apart"	James, Peck	Tommy Lee James	3:47
5.	"I Don't"	Burton Banks Collins, Mills, Peck	Byron Gallimore	3:29
6.	"Sucks to Be You"	Kelly Archer, Andi Zack	Byron Gallimore	3:32
7.	"Honky-Tonk Time"	Peck, Taylor Rhodes	Jeremy Stover	3:00
8.	"Thirsty Again"	Kris Bergsnes, Peck, John Paul White	Byron Gallimore	4:59
9.	"Only the Lonely Talkin'"	Sonny LeMaire, Mills, Shane Minor	Tommy Lee James	3:25
10.	"A Woman Does Too"	James, Peck	Tommy Lee James	3:58
11.	"Somebody for You"	Peck, Stover	Jeremy Stover	4:04

== Personnel ==
Adapted from AllMusic:

- Mike Brignardello - bass
- Tom Bukovac - electric guitar
- Gary Burnette - electric guitar
- J. T. Corenflos - electric guitar
- Dan Dugmore - steel guitar
- Stuart Duncan - fiddle, mandolin
- Shannon Forrest - drums, percussion
- Larry Franklin - fiddle, mandolin
- Paul Franklin - steel guitar
- Byron Gallimore - electric guitar
- Byron Hagen - keyboards
- Doug Kahan - bass
- Troy Lancaster - electric guitar
- Paul Leim - drums, percussion
- Chris Leuzinger - 12-string guitar, acoustic guitar
- Steve Nathan - keyboards
- Jimmy Nichols - keyboards
- Michael Noble - 12-string guitar, acoustic guitar
- Alison Prestwood - bass
- Steven Sheehan - 12-string guitar, acoustic guitar
- Harry Stinson - drums, percussion
- Bryan Sutton - 12-string guitar, acoustic guitar
- Lonnie Wilson - drums, percussion
- Glenn Worf - bass
- Jonathan Yudkin - fiddle, mandolin

== Chart performance ==
=== Album ===
Chart (2006)	Peak position
U.S. Billboard Top Country Albums	23
U.S. Billboard 200	115
U.S. Billboard Top Heatseekers	3

=== Singles ===
Year	Single	Peak chart positions	
Year	Single	US Country	US
2005	"I Don't"	28	—
2006	"Findin' a Good Man"	16	101
2006	"Isn't That Everything"	30	—
"—" denotes releases that did not chart
