= The Little Willies =

American alternative country band

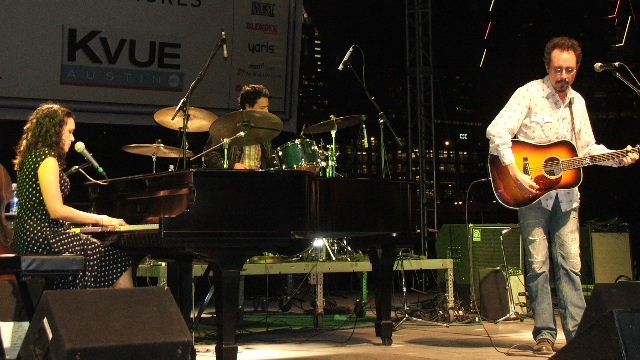
- The Little Willies performing at SXSW in 2006. From left to right: Norah Jones, Dan Rieser, and Richard Julian.

Background information
- Origin: United States
- Genres: Alternative country
- Years active: 2003–present
- Labels: Milking Bull
- Members: Norah Jones; Richard Julian; Jim Campilongo; Lee Alexander; Dan Rieser

The Little Willies is an American alternative country supergroup formed in 2003. It features Norah Jones on piano, keyboards, and vocals; Richard Julian on guitar; keyboards, and vocals; Jim Campilongo on guitar, Lee Alexander on bass; and Dan Rieser on drums.

The group formed around a love of country classics. Between members' regular gigs, they first played at The Living Room in New York City. The show led to a series of events, including a benefit concert for public radio station WFUV. The "loose-knit collective" found itself with a growing following. The Little Willies’ self-titled debut album has added to their popularity.

Their first album features covers of tracks by Fred Rose ("Roly Poly"), Hank Williams ("I'll Never Get Out of This World Alive"), Willie Nelson ("Gotta Get Drunk" and "Nightlife"), Townes Van Zandt ("No Place to Fall") and Kris Kristofferson ("Best of All Possible Worlds"). Fusing cover material with a few of their original compositions, the band delivers what a review by John Metzger describes as "an affable set that occasionally strikes pure gold."

Their second album was released in January, 2012 and "features covers from a variety of down-home legends, including Johnny Cash, Kris Kristofferson, Dolly Parton, Loretta Lynn, and many more."

== Discography ==
=== Albums ===
Title	Album details	Peak chart positions		
Title	Album details	US Country	US	AUS
The Little Willies	Release date: March 7, 2006; Label: Milking Bull	10	48	95
For the Good Times	Release date: January 6, 2012; Label: Milking Bull	9	45	—
