= Rockie Lynne =

American singer-songwriter (born 1964)

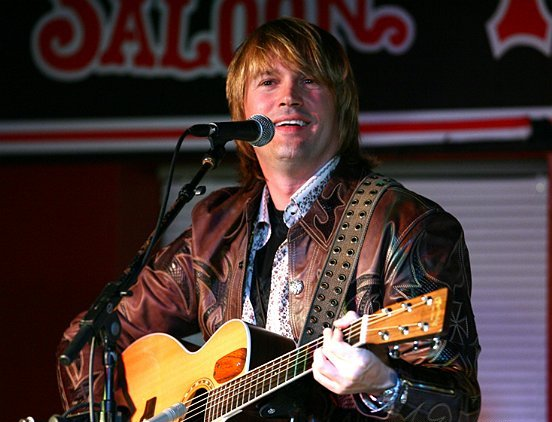
- Rockie Lynne at the Maverick Saloon & Grill, Santa Maria, California, April 21, 2006.

Background information
- Born: Rockie Lynn Rash; November 14, 1964 (age 61)
- Origin: Statesville, North Carolina, United States
- Genres: Country
- Occupation: Singer-songwriter
- Instruments: Vocals, acoustic guitar
- Years active: 2005–present
- Labels: Universal South; Robbins Nashville
- Website: rockielynne.com

Rockie Lynn Rash (born November 14, 1964) is an American country music artist, known professionally as Rockie Lynne. He was signed to Universal South Records in late 2005, releasing his self-titled debut album in early 2006. This album produced three singles on the Billboard Hot Country Songs charts, including the No. 29-peaking "Lipstick". After exiting Universal South's roster in 2007, he signed to Robbins Nashville, where in 2008 he charted his fourth single, "I Can't Believe It's Me".

== Biography ==
Rockie Lynne Rash was adopted in Statesville, North Carolina. His family was composed of Southern Baptists. At age twelve, Lynne bought a guitar from his uncle, as well as a record player and records from Jimi Hendrix and Kiss, which he listened to in the closet. He later played at the jazz ensemble in his high school and went on to perform in local bands.

He later enlisted in the United States Army, and served as a paratrooper in the 82nd Airborne Division while stationed in Fort Bragg in North Carolina. After ending his term in the Army, Lynne attended the Guitar Institute of Technology on the GI bill, before moving to Myrtle Beach, South Carolina, where he worked with a local musician named Mike Shane. He followed Shane to Nashville, Tennessee, in the early 1990s, where he worked as a backing musician for The McCarters and Merle Haggard's son, Noel Haggard. Wanting to perform his own music, Lynne began recording on his own, issuing his own material and eventually moving to Coon Rapids, Minnesota. Later he moved back to Nashville and started a new musical career. He was eventually discovered by a representative of Warner Music Group, who recommended him to Universal South Records.

=== Musical career ===
He signed to Universal South Records in 2005, releasing his debut single "Lipstick" late that year under the name Rockie Lynne. This song became his first chart single, reaching as high as No. 29 on the Billboard country singles charts. It was the first single from his self-titled debut album, which was released in May 2006 via Universal South. The album's other two singles — "Do We Still" and "More" — both missed the Top 40, peaking at No. 46 and No. 48 respectively, and he exited the label by 2007. An independent album, Twilight, followed in February 2007.

He has made 14 appearances on the stage of the Grand Ole Opry.

In late 2007, he became the first artist signed to Robbins Nashville, a newly established independent label founded by New York City-based Robbins Entertainment. He charted for the fourth time with the No. 49 "I Can't Believe It's Me" in 2008.

As a veteran of the United States Army, he is often requested to perform for patriotic and military events and his original songs are regularly licensed for use in conjunction with veteran and patriotic-themed programming.

He is the founder of a national charitable organization founded in Minnesota, Tribute to the Troops, now in its 11th year. The organization has four chapters: Minnesota, Illinois, Oregon, North Carolina. This 501c3 has raised over 300,000 for a college fund designed to provide tuition for children who have lost a parent in active duty.

His original compositions have been included in regional and national network programs, of which highlights include an Emmy Award-winning program produced by Wisconsin Public Television, CBS "Criminal Minds" episodes and "Fox NFL Sunday" broadcast.

== Discography ==
=== Studio albums ===
Title	Album details	Peak chart positions		
Title	Album details	US Country	US	US Heat
Rockie Lynne	Release date: May 2, 2006; Label: Universal South Records; Formats: CD, music download	29	163	4
Twilight	Release date: February 28, 2007; Label: Carolina Blue Sky; Formats: CD, music download	—	—	—
The Early Years	Release date: May 4, 2010; Label: Carolina Blue Sky; Formats: CD, music download	—	—	—
The Dam Show	Release date: May 4, 2010; Label: Carolina Blue Sky; Formats: CD, music download	—	—	—
Songs for Soldiers	Release date: June 1, 2010; Label: Carolina Blue Sky; Formats: CD, music download	—	—	—
Radio Road	Release date: February 10, 2014; Label: Carolina Blue Sky; Formats: CD, music download	—	—	—
"—" denotes releases that did not chart

=== Singles ===
Year	Single	Peak positions	Album
Year	Single	US Country	Album
2005	"Lipstick"	29	Rockie Lynne
2006	"Do We Still"	46	Rockie Lynne
2006	"More"	48	Rockie Lynne
2009	"I Can't Believe It's Me"	49	—N/a

=== Music videos ===
Year	Video	Director
2006	"Lipstick"	Trey Fanjoy
2006	"Do We Still"	Stephen Shepherd
