= Trent Tomlinson =

American singer-songwriter

- Tomlinson singing at the seventh annual Country Music Festival in Essex, Vermont, on July 9, 2006.

Background information
- Born: July 3, 1975 (age 49); Blytheville, Arkansas, United States
- Origin: Kennett, Missouri, United States
- Genres: Country
- Occupation: Singer-songwriter
- Instrument(s): Vocals, guitar
- Years active: 2004–present
- Labels: Lyric Street; Carolwood; Skyville; New Revolution
- Website: trenttomlinson.net

Trent Tomlinson (born July 3, 1975) is an American country music artist. After several failed attempts at finding a record deal, Tomlinson was signed to Lyric Street Records in 2005, with his debut album Country Is My Rock, released in early 2006. This album produced three Top 40 singles on the U.S. Billboard Hot Country Songs charts: "Drunker Than Me" at No. 19, "One Wing in the Fire" at No. 11, and "Just Might Have Her Radio On" at No. 21. Three further singles were released in 2009.

== Biography ==
Tomlinson was born in Blytheville, Arkansas. He was raised in Kennett, Missouri. His father is a former basketball star who set scoring records at the University of Missouri and was drafted by the Cleveland Cavaliers. He was also the basketball coach, biology teacher, and assistant principal at Kennett High School.

In his junior year of high school, Tomlinson reached the finals for "You Can Be a Star," a television talent show on The Nashville Network (now Spike TV), in which Trent placed second. After numerous deals cut short due to labels that went bankrupt or were being taken over, Tomlinson landed a songwriting deal with Cal IV Entertainment. Some of his songs were recorded by Emerson Drive and Blue County on their respective debut albums. He also cut some sides for Lyric Street Records, with whom he later signed a record deal. Tomlinson's debut single, "Drunker Than Me," was released in late 2005, followed by his album Country Is My Rock. Two additional singles were also released from the album: "One Wing in the Fire" and "Just Might Have Her Radio On," the former is a song about Tomlinson's father. Tomlinson also co-wrote the track "Missing Missouri" on Sara Evans's 2005 album Real Fine Place and "Why Can't I Leave Her Alone" on George Strait's 2006 album It Just Comes Natural.

On December 15, 2008, it was announced that Tomlinson would be the second artist signed to Lyric Street's subsidiary label, Carolwood Records. His fourth single, "That's How It Still Oughta Be," made its chart debut in January 2009. That song fell from the charts in May 2009 and was replaced by "Henry Cartwright's Produce Stand." A third single, "Angels Like Her" (a re-recording of a song on his debut), was released on October 26, 2009, shortly before the closure of Carolwood. Tomlinson subsequently returned to Lyric Street before parting ways in March 2010. All three songs were included on an EP titled A Guy Like Me.

Tomlinson released "Man Without a Woman" via Skyville Records in 2011, and did not release an album despite the single charting. In 2014, Parmalee released the single "Close Your Eyes," which Tomlinson co-wrote.

Tomlinson also co-wrote the RIAA Diamond Certified hit "In Case You Didn't Know" which was released in 2017.

== Personal life ==
Tomlinson married model Jessica Lowman on March 22, 2008. They have one daughter, Harleigh Alexyia Tomlinson, who was born January 14, 2008. Tomlinson and Lowman are now divorced.

== Discography ==
=== Studio albums ===
Title	Album details	Peak chart positions	
Title	Album details	US Country	US
Country Is My Rock	Release date: March 7, 2006; Label: Lyric Street Records	20	95
That's What's Working Right Now	Release date: October 7, 2016; Label: Mucho Love Music	—	—

=== Extended plays ===
Title	Album details
A Guy Like Me	Release date: January 12, 2010; Label: Lyric Street Records

=== Singles ===
Year	Single	Peak chart positions		Album
Year	Single	US Country	US	Album
2005	"Drunker Than Me"	19	— (Note: "Drunker Than Me" did not enter the Hot 100, but peaked at number 3 on Bubbling Under Hot 100 Singles.)	Country Is My Rock
2006	"One Wing in the Fire"	11	90	Country Is My Rock
2007	"Just Might Have Her Radio On"	21	— (Note: "Just Might Have Her Radio On" did not enter the Hot 100, but peaked at number 14 on Bubbling Under Hot 100 Singles.)	Country Is My Rock
2009	"That's How It Still Oughta Be"	34	—	A Guy Like Me
2009	"Henry Cartwright's Produce Stand"	44	—	A Guy Like Me
2009	"Angels Like Her"	—	—	A Guy Like Me
2010	"Cross My Heart"	—	—	Non-album song
2011	"A Man Without a Woman"	59	—	When I Get on a Roll (unreleased)
2014	"Come Back To Bed"	—	—	Non-album song
2016	"When She Goes There"	—	—	That's What's Working Right Now
2017	"That's What's Working Right Now"	—	—	That's What's Working Right Now
"—" denotes releases that did not chart

=== Music videos ===
Year	Video	Director
2005	"Drunker Than Me"	Trey Fanjoy
2006	"One Wing in the Fire"	Shaun Silva
2007	"Just Might Have Her Radio On"	Steve Cook
2014	"Come Back to Bed"	
2016	"When She Goes There"	
