= Danielle Peck =

American singer-songwriter

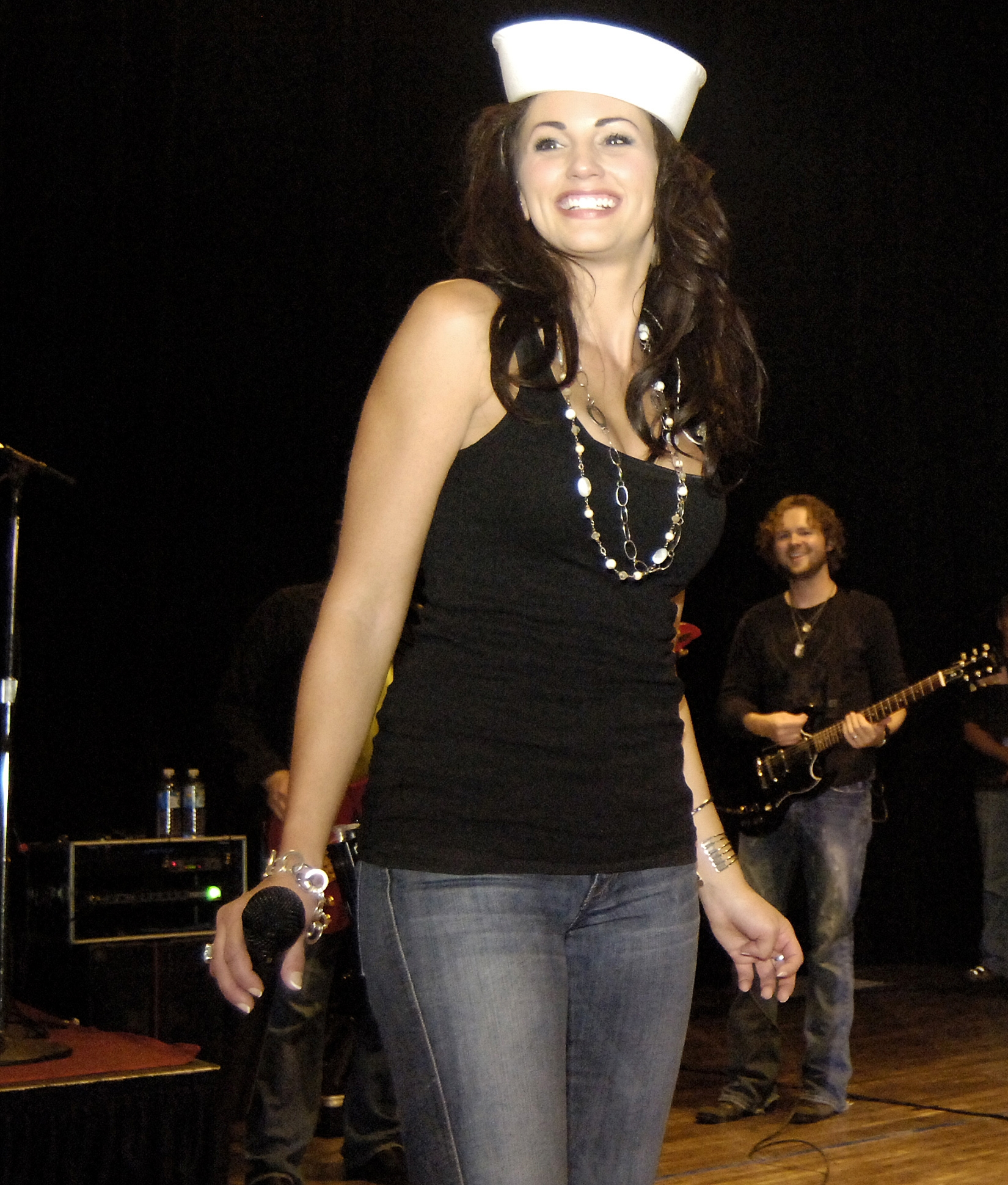
- Danielle Peck performing for the troops at Naval Submarine Base New London May 31, 2007, for the Spirit of America tour

Background information
- Born: Danielle Marie Peck; September 14, 1978 (age 47)
- Origin: Jacksonville, North Carolina, United States
- Genres: Country
- Occupation: Singer-songwriter
- Years active: 2005–present
- Labels: DreamWorks Nashville, Big Machine
- Website: www.daniellepeck.com

Danielle Marie Peck (born September 14, 1978) is an American country music artist. Signed to the independent Big Machine Records label in 2005, Peck released her self-titled debut album, which produced the Top 30 country hits "I Don't", "Findin' a Good Man", and "Isn't That Everything". A fourth single, "Bad for Me", charted in mid-2007. Peck is now heard as a host on "Y2Kountry," a country music station on SiriusXM radio.

== Biography ==
=== Early life ===
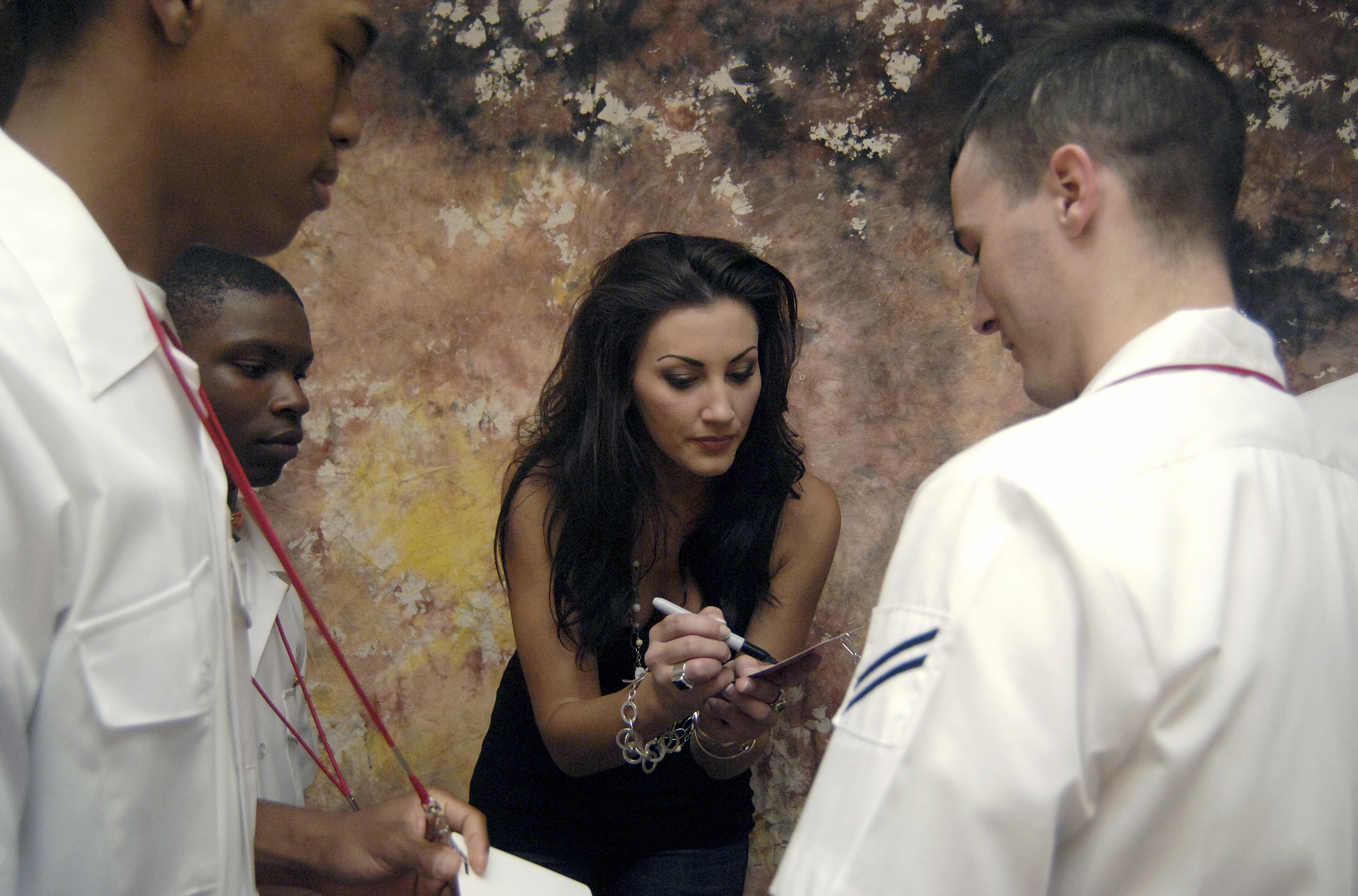
Danielle Peck signs autographs for sailors during the Spirit of America tour, May 31, 2007

Peck was born in Jacksonville, North Carolina, but was raised in Coshocton, Ohio. She is the daughter of a United States Marine. Her parents both came from musical backgrounds. Her mother's side of the family traveled and sang in churches. Her fathers' parents and grandparents were steeped in country music, playing dances in the area.

The first song she ever sang was Johnny Cash's "Folsom Prison Blues," which she continues to perform in her live shows to this day. She wrote her first song before the age of 10. She also sang in her church, as solo and as part of a choir. At age 16, she joined a band called The Neon Moon Band, which performed around the local area.

After graduating from River View High School in 1997, Peck formed her own band that performed at festivals and other events. She then moved to Nashville, Tennessee, finding work as a waitress while pursuing a career in country music. While in Nashville, she met Clay Myers, a publisher who signed her to a deal as a songwriter with Barbara Orbison's Still Working Music. Peck soon started writing for her staff members.

=== Musical career ===
Soon, Peck signed a recording contract with DreamWorks Records, with executive Scott Borchetta. She was working on her debut album when DreamWorks folded and Borchetta founded his own record company entitled Big Machine Records, which would go on to be the record company for artists like Taylor Swift and Tim McGraw.

In 2005, she released her debut single, "I Don't" (co-written with Clay Mills and Burton Collins). The song peaked at number 28 on the U.S. Billboard Hot Country Songs chart. Peck then released her eponymous debut album in June 2006. The album peaked at number 23 on the Billboard Top Country Albums chart and produced two more Top 30 singles in "Findin' a Good Man" (her highest-charting single to date) and "Isn't That Everything". Also in 2006, Peck took part in a duet with fellow country singer Jack Ingram on his 2006 album Live: Wherever You Are, titled "Never Knocked Me Down," which was an audio excerpt from the CMT program Outlaws 2005.

Peck released her fourth single in early 2007. Titled "Bad For Me," the single (which was co-written by Australian country singer Sherrié Austin) was intended to be the lead-off to an upcoming second album. "Bad For Me" failed to reach the Hot Country Songs Top 40 (number 46), however, and the second album's release date was delayed until late 2008. That album, titled Can't Behave, was released on December 23 of that year, though it was only available through digital retailers. The title track to Can't Behave was then released as a single in January 2009. The single, however, failed to chart altogether, and Peck parted ways with Big Machine shortly afterward.

=== 2007 ALCS controversy ===
In 2006, Peck briefly dated Boston Red Sox pitcher Josh Beckett. On October 18, 2007, she was a last-minute choice to sing the national anthem before Game 5 of the American League Championship Series between the Red Sox and the Cleveland Indians. While the Indians organization stated that she was chosen because she was an Ohio native and Indians fan, it was believed that she was brought in to distract Beckett, who was starting the game for the Red Sox. Beckett went on to a decisive victory, and when asked about Peck's presence, he replied: "I don't get paid to make those fucking decisions...she's a friend of mine. It doesn't bother me at all. Thanks for flying one of my friends to the game, so she could watch it for free." Peck has never publicly commented on the incident.

== Discography ==
=== Studio albums ===
Title	Details	Peak chart positions		
Title	Details	US Country	US	US Heat
Danielle Peck	Release date: June 6, 2006; Label: Big Machine Records; Formats: CD, music download	23	115	3
Can't Behave	Release date: December 23, 2008; Label: Big Machine Records; Formats: Music download	—	—	—
"—" denotes releases that did not chart

=== Singles ===
Year	Single	Peak chart positions			Album
Year	Single	US Country	US Country Airplay	US Bubbling	Album
2005	"I Don't"	28		—	Danielle Peck
2006	"Findin' a Good Man"	16		1	Danielle Peck
2006	"Isn't That Everything"	30		—	Danielle Peck
2007	"Bad for Me"	46		—	Can't Behave
2009	"Can't Behave"	—		—	Can't Behave
2012	"Impossible Dreams"	—	—	—	How Freedom Feels (unreleased)
2014	"Kiss Me Like You Miss Me"	—	—	—	How Freedom Feels (unreleased)
"—" denotes releases that did not chart

=== Music videos ===
Year	Video	Director
2005	"I Don't"	Trey Fanjoy
2006	"Findin' a Good Man"	Shaun Silva
2006	"Isn't That Everything"	Shaun Silva
2007	"Bad for Me"	Trey Fanjoy
2013	"Impossible Dreams"	Zac Adams

== Personal life ==
In 2006, Peck dated former MLB pitcher Josh Beckett. On June 12, 2014, Peck married tour production manager Josh Smith in Ballina, Ireland. The following year, on August 16, they welcomed their first child together, daughter Ava Jolie Smith. Peck and Smith separated in March 2016, according to her official page.
