= Findin' a Good Man =

Single by Danielle Peck

from the album Danielle Peck
- Released: February 27, 2006
- Genre: Country
- Length: 3:14
- Label: Big Machine
- Songwriters: Casey Koesel; Brian Dean Maher; Jeremy Stover
- Producer: Jeremy Stover

Danielle Peck singles chronology
"I Don't" (2005)	"Findin' a Good Man" (2006)	"Isn't That Everything" (2006)

"Findin' a Good Man" is a song recorded by American country music artist Danielle Peck. It was released in February 2006 as the second single from her debut album Danielle Peck. The song was written by Casey Koesel, Brian Dean Maher and Jeremy Stover.

== Content ==
The narrator addresses the struggles she and her girl friends go through in order to find men that meet their expectations.

=== Composition ===
The song is set in the key of D-flat major at a tempo of 104 beats per minute.

== Music video ==
The music video was directed by Shaun Silva and premiered in April 20, 2006.

== Chart performance ==
"Findin' a Good Man" debuted at number 58 on the U.S. Billboard Hot Country Songs chart for the week of March 18, 2006.

Chart (2006)	Peak position
US Hot Country Songs (Billboard)	16
US Billboard Bubbling Under Hot 100	1

=== Year-end charts ===
Chart (2006)	Position
US Country Songs (Billboard)	58
