= The Seashores of Old Mexico =

Single by George Strait

from the album Somewhere Down in Texas
- Released: February 13, 2006
- Genre: Country
- Length: 4:11
- Label: MCA Nashville
- Songwriter: Merle Haggard
- Producers: Tony Brown, George Strait

George Strait singles chronology
| "She Let Herself Go" (2005) | "The Seashores of Old Mexico" (2006) | "Give It Away" (2006) |

"The Seashores of Old Mexico" is a country music song written by Merle Haggard. It was first performed by Hank Snow in 1971, then by Freddy Weller in 1972, then by Merle Haggard in 1974, and in 1987 by Merle Haggard and Willie Nelson as a duet. Snow's version was a Top Ten hit in Canada, peaking at #6 on the RPM Top Country Tracks charts.

George Strait released a cover version to country radio stations on February 13, 2006, as the third and final single from his 2005 album Somewhere Down in Texas. Strait's version peaked at #11 on the Billboard Hot Country Songs chart in 2006. "The Seashores of Old Mexico" was nominated for Best Male Country Vocal Performance at the 2007 Grammy Awards.

== Content ==
In the country song, “The Seashores of Old Mexico,” a young man from Tucson, Arizona, decides to go to Mexico for a better life. He fills his pickup truck with all his belongings, and heads south of the border. The first thing that goes wrong is that he loses all his money playing poker. Then, his truck breaks down, and he ends up hitchhiking to a beach town. This turns out to be a blessing in disguise. He finds love and spends the rest of his life there.

== Music video ==
The music video for George Strait's song “The Seashores of Old Mexico” was filmed in Tulum, Quintana Roo, Mexico on February 13, 2006. It was directed by Trey Fanjoy, and produced by Robin Beresford. The video premiered on CMT on March 23, 2006, and became a hit song reaching #1 for the top spot on the CMT Top Twenty Countdown in July 2006. The song was also memorable because it was Strait's first video in four years.

== Chart history ==
=== Hank Snow ===
| Chart (1971) | Peak position |
|---|---|
| Canadian RPM Top Country Tracks | 6 |

=== George Strait ===
| Chart (2006) | Peak position |
|---|---|
| Canada Country (Radio & Records) | 7 |
| US Hot Country Songs (Billboard) | 11 |
| US Billboard Hot 100 | 85 |

==== Year-end charts ====
| Chart (2006) | Position |
|---|---|
| US Country Songs (Billboard) | 53 |
