= Drunker Than Me =

Single by Trent Tomlinson

from the album Country Is My Rock
- Released: October 24, 2005
- Genre: Country
- Length: 3:11
- Label: Lyric Street
- Songwriters: Trent Tomlinson; Ashe Underwood
- Producers: "Hillbilly"; Leigh Reynolds; Trent Tomlinson

Trent Tomlinson singles chronology
"Drunker Than Me" (2005)	"One Wing in the Fire" (2006)

"Drunker Than Me" is the debut single by American country music artist Trent Tomlinson. It was released in October 2005 as the first single from his debut album Country Is My Rock. Tomlinson co-wrote the song with Ashe Underwood.

== Music video ==
The music video was directed by Trey Fanjoy and premiered in November 2005.

== Chart performance ==
The song debuted at number 56 on the U.S. Billboard Hot Country Songs chart for the week of October 22, 2005.

Chart (2005–2006)	Peak position
US Hot Country Songs (Billboard)	19
US Bubbling Under Hot 100 Singles (Billboard)	3
