= Drottningstorp =

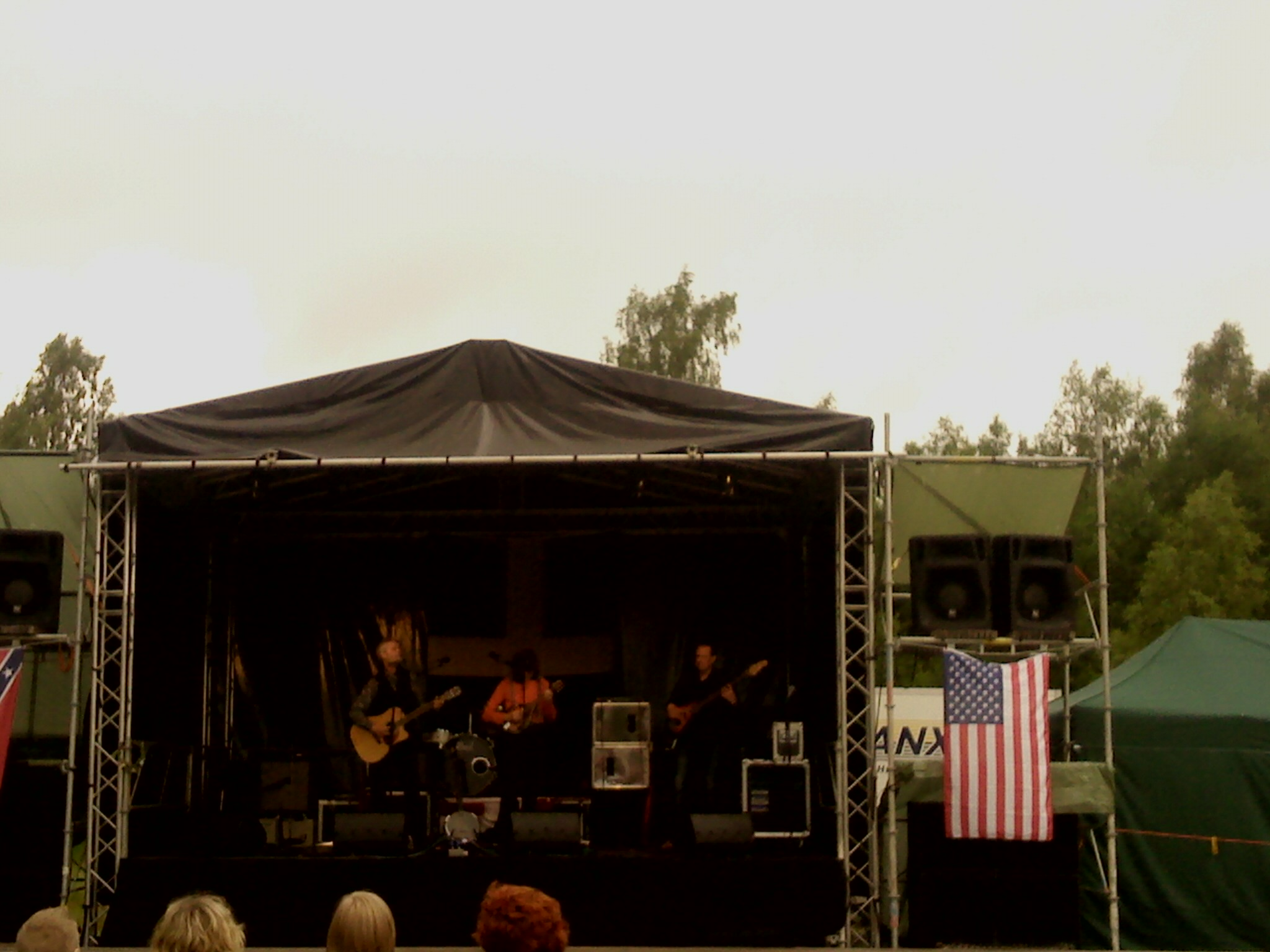
- Drottningstorp Midsummer Day Country, 22 June 2013

- Location within Jönköping Location within Sweden
- Coordinates: 57°50′29″N 14°00′34″E
- Country: Sweden
- Province: Västergötland
- County: Jönköping
- Municipality: Habo
- Time zone: UTC+1 (CET)
  - Summer (DST): UTC+2 (CEST)

Drottningstorp is a village in Habo Municipality, Sweden, located near the western shorelines of Domneådammen between Habo and Mullsjö. Since 2006, an annual country music festival, "Drottningstorps midsommardagscountry", has been held here on Midsummer Day.
