= She Let Herself Go =

Single by George Strait

from the album Somewhere Down in Texas
- Released: September 6, 2005
- Recorded: 2005
- Genre: Country
- Length: 3:16
- Label: MCA Nashville
- Songwriters: Dean Dillon, Kerry Kurt Phillips
- Producers: George Strait, Tony Brown

George Strait singles chronology
"You'll Be There" (2005)	"She Let Herself Go" (2005)	"The Seashores of Old Mexico" (2006)

"She Let Herself Go" is a song written by Dean Dillon and Kerry Kurt Phillips, and recorded by American country music singer George Strait. It was released in September 2005 as the second single from Strait's album Somewhere Down in Texas. The song reached the top of the Billboard Hot Country Songs chart in January 2006. The song became Strait's 40th Number One single on the U.S. Billboard Hot Country Songs charts, tying the record held at the time by Conway Twitty.

== Critical reception ==
Stephen Thomas Erlewine reviewed the song favorably, calling it a "clever breakup tale".

== Chart positions ==
"She Let Herself Go" debuted at number 49 on the U.S. Billboard Hot Country Songs for the week of September 17, 2005.

Chart (2005–2006)	Peak position
Canada Country (Radio & Records)	3
US Hot Country Songs (Billboard)	1
US Billboard Hot 100	54

=== Year-end charts ===
Chart (2006)	Position
US Country Songs (Billboard)	36

== Certifications ==
Region	Certification	Certified units/sales
United States (RIAA)	Gold	500,000^{‡}
^{‡} Sales+streaming figures based on certification alone.
