= Your Man (Josh Turner song) =

Single by Josh Turner

Single by Josh Turner

from the album Your Man
- Released: July 26, 2005
- Recorded: 2005
- Genre: Country; neotraditional country
- Length: 3:31
- Label: MCA Nashville
- Songwriters: Chris Stapleton; Chris DuBois; Jace Everett
- Producer: Frank Rogers

Josh Turner singles chronology
"What It Ain't" (2004)	"Your Man" (2005)	"Would You Go with Me" (2006)

"Your Man" is a song recorded by American country music artist Josh Turner. It was released in July 2005 as the lead-off single and title track from his album of the same name. The fourth chart single of his career, it became his first number one hit on the US Billboard Hot Country Songs charts in early 2006. The song was certified Gold in 2006 by the RIAA, Platinum in 2012, Double Platinum in 2018 and Triple Platinum in 2021. It has sold 1,307,000 copies in the United States as of November 2015.

The song won American Society of Composers, Authors and Publishers (ASCAP) awards for writers Chris Stapleton and Chris DuBois, as well as a Broadcast Music Incorporated (BMI) award for writer Jace Everett upon its reaching number one.

In May 2026, Scotty McCreery released a cover version of the song featuring Turner. The two artists had previously performed it during McCreery's audition for American Idol in 2011. This version appears on McCreery's greatest hits album, 15, which was released on July 17, 2026.

== Chart performance ==
Chart (2005–2006)	Peak position
Canada Country (Radio & Records)	2
US Billboard Hot 100	38
US Hot Country Songs (Billboard)	1

=== Year-end charts ===
Chart (2006)	Position
US Country Songs (Billboard)	21

== Certifications and sales ==
Region	Certification	Certified units/sales
Denmark (IFPI Danmark)	Gold	45,000^{‡}
New Zealand (RMNZ)	4× Platinum	120,000^{‡}
United Kingdom (BPI)	Silver	200,000^{‡}
United States (RIAA)	5× Platinum	5,000,000^{‡}
^{‡} Sales+streaming figures based on certification alone.

== See also ==
- List of number-one country singles of 2006 (U.S.)
