= Your Man (album) =

Studio album by Josh Turner
- Released: January 24, 2006
- Recorded: 2005
- Studios: Sound Kitchen and The Castle (Franklin, Tennessee); Sound Emporium, Masterfonics and Sonic Lab (Nashville, Tennessee)
- Genre: Country
- Length: 39:36
- Label: MCA Nashville
- Producer: Frank Rogers

Josh Turner chronology
Long Black Train (2003)	Your Man (2006)	Everything Is Fine (2007)

Singles from Your Man
- 1. "Your Man" Released: July 26, 2005; 2. "Would You Go with Me" Released: April 24, 2006; 3. "Me and God" Released: November 13, 2006

Professional ratings
Review scores
Source	Rating
AllMusic	3.5/5 stars
Slant	2/5 stars

Your Man is the second studio album by American country music artist Josh Turner. It released on January 24, 2006, and debuted at No. 2 on the U.S. Billboard 200 chart, and debuted at No. 1 on the Top Country Albums

"Your Man" was the first single/title track released followed by "Would You Go with Me" and "Me and God." Also included is a cover of Don Williams' 1991 hit single "Lord Have Mercy on a Country Boy". The single "Your Man" would become one of two singles that would be his first singles to become gold, on June 1, 2006, along with his 2003 single, "Long Black Train".

To celebrate the album's 20th anniversary, a deluxe edition with six additional tracks was released on August 14th, 2026.

== Grammy Award nominations ==
Turner received two 2007 Grammy nominations for his work on Your Man. He received a Best Male Country Vocal Performance nomination for the album's first track and second single, "Would You Go with Me" and a Best Country Album nomination.

== Track listing ==
No.	Title	Writer(s)	Length
1.	"Would You Go with Me"	Shawn Camp, John Scott Sherrill	3:49
2.	"Baby's Gone Home to Mama"	Camp, Herb McCullough	3:07
3.	"No Rush"	Camp, Brice Long, Billy Burnette	4:08
4.	"Your Man"	Jace Everett, Chris DuBois, Chris Stapleton	3:31
5.	"Loretta Lynn's Lincoln"	Camp, Mark D. Sanders	3:56
6.	"White Noise" (featuring John Anderson)	Josh Turner, John Anderson	3:24
7.	"Angels Fall Sometimes"	Turner, Mark Nesler, Tony Martin	2:59
8.	"Lord Have Mercy on a Country Boy"	Bob McDill	3:07
9.	"Me and God" (featuring Ralph Stanley, plus Marty Roe, Gene Johnson, and Dana Williams of Diamond Rio)	Turner	3:01
10.	"Gravity"	Turner, Mark Narmore	3:39
11.	"Way Down South"	Turner	4:53
Total length:			39:36

Your Man — 20th anniversary deluxe edition
No.	Title	Writer(s)	Length
12.	"Hard Headed (Note: Spelled on the physical release as "Head Headed")"	Sherrill; Sonny Tillis	4:04
13.	"Your Man (Live In Kansas City, MO/2012)"	Everett; DuBois; Stapleton	3:39
14.	"Would You Go with Me (Live In Plant City, FL/2012)"	Camp; Sherrill	3:48
15.	"Me and God (Live In Key Largo, FL/2012)"	Turner	3:18
16.	"Your Man (Live In Nashville At The Hermitage Hotel/2021)"	Everett; DuBois; Stapleton	3:11
17.	"Me and God (Live In Nashville At The Hermitage Hotel/2021)"	Turner	3:02
Total length:			1:00:38

== Charts ==
Your Man debuted at number four on the U.S. Billboard 200 and debuted at number one on the Top Country Albums chart, becoming his first number-one country album.

=== Weekly charts ===
Chart (2006)	Peak position
US Billboard 200	2
US Top Country Albums (Billboard)	1

=== Year-end charts ===
Chart (2006)	Position
US Billboard 200	33
US Top Country Albums (Billboard)	9

Chart (2007)	Position
US Billboard 200	63
US Top Country Albums (Billboard)	13

== Certifications ==
On February 28, 2006, "Your Man" was certified gold, on August 4, 2006, it was certified platinum and on March 1, 2007, it was certified 2× platinum by the RIAA. It was certified 3× platinum in 2023.

Region	Certification	Certified units/sales
United States (RIAA)	3× Platinum	3,000,000^{‡}
^{‡} Sales+streaming figures based on certification alone.

== Personnel ==
Musicians

- Josh Turner – vocals
- Jim "Moose" Brown – acoustic piano (1, 6), Wurlitzer electric piano (5)
- Gordon Mote – clavinet (2), acoustic piano (3, 4, 7–10), Hammond B3 organ (3, 10-12), Wurlitzer electric piano (11, 12)
- Jeff King – electric guitar (1, 5) baritone guitar (1)
- B. James Lowry – acoustic guitar (1, 5, 6)
- Brent Rowan – electric guitar (2–4, 6–8, 10-12), six-string bass guitar (2), baritone guitar (7, 9, 10), tic tac bass (8)
- Biff Watson – acoustic guitar (2, 7, 8)
- Ron Block – banjo (1)
- Bryan Sutton – banjo (2, 9, 11, 12), acoustic guitar (3, 4, 9–12)
- Aubrey Haynie – mandolin (1, 9, 11-12), fiddle (2–10)
- Mike Johnson – dobro (1)
- Steve Hinson – dobro (2, 7, 9, 11, 12), steel guitar (3–8, 10)
- Kevin "Swine" Grantt – bass guitar (1, 4–8, 10), double bass (2, 3, 9, 11, 12)
- Shannon Forrest – drums
- Eric Darken – percussion, vibraphone (3, 4)
- "Shoulder Man" – ride cymbal (11, 12)
- Wes Hightower – backing vocals (1–8, 10-12)
- Russell Terrell – backing vocals (2–8, 10-12)
- Liana Manis – backing vocals (3)
- Melodie Crittenden – backing vocals (5)
- Pat McLaughlin – backing vocals (5)
- Kim Parent – backing vocals (5)
- Chris Stapleton – backing vocals (5)
- John Anderson – vocals (6)
- Ralph Stanley – vocals (9)
- Gene Johnson – backing vocals (9)
- Marty Roe – backing vocals (9)
- Dana Williams – backing vocals (9)

Technical

- Frank Rogers – producer
- Chuck Ainlay – recording
- Richard Barrow – recording, mixing, additional recording
- Greg Droman – recording, mixing
- Justin Niebank – mixing
- Neal Cappellino – additional recording, digital editing
- Kenzi Butler – recording assistant
- Todd Gunnerson – recording assistant
- Matt "Mat5t" Weeks – recording assistant
- Drew Bollman – mix assistant
- Melissa Mattey – mix assistant
- Steve Short – mix assistant
- Brady Barnett – digital editing
- Adam Hatley – digital editing
- Tyler Moles – digital editing
- Brian David Willis – digital editing
- Hank Williams – mastering at MasterMix (Nashville, Tennessee)
- Phillip Stein – production assistant
- Craig Allen – art direction
- Josh Turner – art direction
- Margaret Malandruccolo – photography
- Trish Townsend – wardrobe
- Debra Wingo – make-up, hair stylist
