= Jim Campilongo =

American roots rock guitarist

Background information
- Born: South San Francisco, California, U.S.
- Genres: Pop, rock, country, jazz
- Occupation: Musician
- Instrument: Guitar
- Years active: 1990s–present
- Label: Blue Hen
- Member of: The Little Willies
- Website: jimcampilongo.com

Jim Campilongo is a New York roots rock guitarist, known for recording a series of mostly instrumental albums. He is also known for being a member of The Little Willies with Norah Jones.

Campilongo primarily plays Fender Telecaster guitars. He employs a hybrid right-hand technique that involves the use of both a plectrum and his fingers. He holds a mandolin pick between his thumb and forefinger while plucking with his middle and fourth fingers.

He writes the popular monthly column "Vinyl Treasures" for Guitar Player magazine.

== Musical career ==
Campilongo was born in South San Francisco, California. When he was nine, he discovered the Beatles and Jimi Hendrix. He became interested in improvisation, saying in one interview, "I knew I liked improvisation and long musical journeys...so I used to buy albums based exclusively on how long the tracks were...That's how I discovered John Coltrane Live in Japan, John McLaughlin Devotion, a couple of different Cream albums."

Campilongo's career began in the mid-1970s. He studied guitar in San Francisco with Bunnie Gregoire, who taught him to embrace many genres of music, including the work of jazz guitarist George Van Eps and country singer John Denver. He used S&H Green Stamps to buy his first guitar. One of Campilongo's biggest influences at the time was blues guitarist Roy Buchanan. When Campilongo was seventeen he began performing with local bands Radio City, the Rick Slyter Group, The Chromatics, Nancie and the Neighbors and went on to play with Marcus Fillinger and the San Francisco “World Beat” scene that led to a stint in the Renegades of Funk. 1992 was a transitional period when Campilongo formed Van Riff with Tim Wagar, Gene Rifkin and singer Van Riff, an original country group that featured Campilongo.

His recording career started in San Francisco in 1996 when he formed Jim Campilongo and the 10 Gallon Cats. After winning a Bammie for Outstanding Americana/Roots Artist, four solo records and countless club and festival performances, Campilongo pulled up stakes.

In 2002, he moved to New York City and formed his Electric Trio, which toured Europe and Scandinavia and recorded the album American Hips for Blue Hen Records. In 2003, he formed the group The Little Willies with Norah Jones, Richard Julian, Lee Alexander, and Dan Rieser.

He has played with Al Anderson, Bright Eyes, Cake, J. J. Cale, Steve Cardenas, Burning Spear, Chris Cheek, Nels Cline, Patrick Stewart, Charlie Hunter, Adam Levy, Sunny Ozell, Peter Rowan, Teddy Thompson, Martha Wainwright and Norah Jones

Campilongo released Orange in 2010. In 2011, "Awful Pretty, Pretty Awful" was nominated for Best Instrumental Song at the 10th Annual Independent Music Awards.

His album Dream Dictionary (2014) included Chris Morrissey (bass) and Josh Dion (drums). Other contributions came from Steve Cardenas, who played on two acoustic songs, and Norah Jones, who sang the album's only vocal on "Here I Am" by Ray Charles.

On Last Night, This Morning Campilongo joined the Honeyfingers with Luca Benedetti (guitar), Jonny Lam (pedal and lap steel guitar), Roy Williams (acoustic guitar, piano, organ), Dave Speranza (double bass) and Russ Meissner (drums).

In 2018 Campilongo released Live at Rockwood that included guest artist Nels Cline.

In 2020, Campilongo collaborated with Luca Benedetti on Two Guitars.

In 2023, Campilongo released New Year with guitarist Steve Cardenas on Sunnyside Records.

In 2024, Campilongo released his 16th album, The Jim Campilongo 4TET Record.

In 2026, Campilongo released Man In a Ball, in a Ball recorded in Buenos Aires. The record featured Argentinean musicians, including Mariano Otero, Sergio Verdinelli and Nana Arguen.

== Instruments ==
For many years, Campilongo's primary guitar was a 1959 Telecaster toploader. In 2010, the Fender Custom Shop introduced a limited-edition Campilongo Signature Fender Telecaster, and Campilongo has performed live and recorded with examples of his signature model as well.

In 2018, he collaborated with luthier Chihoe Hahn to create the Hahn Campilongo Model C guitar, an electric guitar based on the Fender Telecaster.

Over 2023 and 2024 Jim collaborated with Lumiere Guitars who are based in Buenos Aires. Together they conceived the Jim Campilongo T Model guitar based on the design of a Duosonic with a Firebird humbucking pickup in neck position along with a gold anodized pickguard. https://www.jimcampilongo.com/gear.html

== Discography ==
=== As leader ===
- Jim Campilongo and the 10 Gallon Cats (Blue Hen, 1996)
- Loose (Blue Hen, 1997)
- Table for One (Blue Hen, 1998)
- Heavy (Blue Hen, 2000)
- Live at the Du Nord (Ethic, 2000)
- American Hips (Blue Hen, 2003)
- The Little Willies (Milking Bull, 2005)
- Heaven Is Creepy (Blue Hen, 2006)
- Almost Christmas (Blue Hen, 2008)
- Orange (Blue Hen, 2009)
- For the Good Times (Milking Bull, 2012)
- Dream Dictionary (Blue Hen, 2014)
- Last Night This Morning (Blue Hen, 2016)
- Live at Rockwood Music Hall NYC (Blue Hen, 2017)
- Two Guitars with Luca Benedetti (Blue Hen, 2020)
- New Year with Steve Cardenas (Sunnyside, 2023)
- She Loved the Coney Island Freak Show Jim Campilongo 4TET (Blue Hen, 2024)
- Man in a Ball, in a Ball (Blue Hen 2026)

=== As sideman ===
- Cake, Prolonging the Magic (Capricorn, 1998)
- Norah Jones, ...Featuring (Blue Note, 2010)
- Norah Jones, Covers (Blue Note, 2012)
- Hazmat Modine, Live (Jaro Medien, 2014)
- Brandi Shearer, Close to Dark (Amoeba, 2007)
- Brandi Shearer, Pink Lady (Amoeba, 2006)
- Patrick Stewart, Patrick Stewart's Cowboy Classics (Sampler, 2016)
- Teddy Thompson, Upfront & Down Low (Verve Forecast, 2007)
- Martha Wainwright, I Know You're Married But I've Got Feelings Too (Zoe, 2008)
