= American Idols Live! Tour 2003 =

2003 summer concert tour

American Idols LIVE! Tour 2003
- Tour by American Idol
- Clockwise from top right – Kimberly Caldwell, Julia DeMato, Kimberley Locke, Rickey Smith, Charles Grigsby, Carmen Rusmusen, Trenyce; Center – Ruben Studdard, Clay Aiken
- Start date: July 8, 2003
- End date: August 31, 2003
- No. of shows: 41
- Box office: US$15.6 million

American Idol concert chronology
- American Idols Live! Tour 2002 (2002); American Idols Live! Tour 2003 (2003); American Idols Live! Tour 2004 (2004)

American Idols Live! Tour 2003 was a concert tour featuring 9 of the top 12 contestants of the second season of American Idol, which aired in 2003. It began on July 8, 2003, St. Paul, Minnesota and finished on August 31, 2003, in Anaheim, California. 5th place finisher Josh Gracin was unable to participate in the tour as he was recalled to his unit in the U.S. Marines, and Corey Clark was barred from participating due to his failure to reveal his Misdemeanor arrest. Clark was replaced by Charles Grigsby for the tour, but the show producers opted not to replace Gracin nor the twelfth-placed finisher Vanessa Olivarez.

Following the success of the first concert tour of 2002, the tour was expanded to 41 dates, including a stop in Canada. The tour was sponsored by Kellogg's Pop-Tarts.

== Performers ==
9 of Top 12
Ruben Studdard (winner)	Clay Aiken (2nd place)
Kimberley Locke (3rd place)	Trenyce (5th place)
Carmen Rasmusen (6th place)	Kimberly Caldwell (7th place)
Rickey Smith (8th place)	Julia DeMato (10th place)
Charles Grigsby (11th place)	

== Show overview ==
The show had the similar structure as that of the previous season, with the first half being entirely solos performed by contestants in elimination order, and the second half consisting of performances in groups and some solos. There was however more varied ensemble singing with a number of duets and a few trios introduced.

== Setlist ==
- Charles Grigsby – "Do I Do" (Stevie Wonder)
- Julia DeMato – "Beautiful" (Christina Aguilera)
- Rickey Smith – "The Way You Make Me Feel" (Michael Jackson)
- Kimberly Caldwell – "Stuck" (Stacie Orrico)
- Carmen Rasmusen – "Up!" (Shania Twain)
- Trenyce – "Proud Mary" (Tina Turner)
- Kimberley Locke – "Band of Gold" (Freda Payne)
- Clay Aiken – "This is the Night" (Clay Aiken)
- Ruben Studdard – "Superstar" (The Carpenters), "Never Too Much" (Luther Vandross)

Intermission

- Guys – "The Lady Is a Tramp" (Frank Sinatra)
- Ladies – "Bootylicious" (Destiny's Child)
- Studdard and Aiken – "The Girl is Mine" (Michael Jackson/Paul McCartney)
- Locke – "Inseparable" (Natalie Cole)
- Group – Bee Gees medley – "Jive Talkin'" (Grigsby), "Stayin' Alive" (Smith), "How Deep Is Your Love" (Grigsby, Smith, Aiken), "To Love Somebody" (Aiken), "Emotion" (DeMato, Caldwell, Rasmussen, Trenyce), "If I Can't Have You" (Locke), "Nights on Broadway" (Studdard), "Night Fever" (Group), "You Should Be Dancing" (Group)
- Studdard – "Can I Get Your Attention" (Ruben Studdard) or "No Ruben" (Ruben Studdard)
- Grigsby and Smith – "Let's Go Crazy" (Prince)
- Rasmusen (with Grigsby and Smith) – "Let's Hear It for the Boy" (Deniece Williams)
- Aiken – "Can You Feel the Love Tonight" (Elton John)
- Locke – "Over the Rainbow" (Judy Garland)
- Caldwell (with Rasmusen and DeMato) – "Feel Good Time" (Pink)
- Smith and DeMato – "If I Never Met You"
- Trenyce – "I Have Nothing" (Whitney Houston)
- Ladies – "I'm Every Woman" (Chaka Khan)
- Studdard and Locke – "The Best Things in Life Are Free" (Luther Vandross and Janet Jackson)
- Group – "(I've Had) The Time of My Life" (Bill Medley and Jennifer Warnes)
- Aiken – "Invisible" (D-Side)
- Studdard – "Flying Without Wings" (Westlife)
- Studdard, Aiken and Locke – "Imagine" (John Lennon)
- Group – "God Bless the U.S.A." (Lee Greenwood)

Additional notes

- Ruben Studdard performed either "Can I Get Your Attention" or "No Ruben" at different shows.

== Tour dates ==
Date	City	Country	Venue	Attendance (percentage)
July 8, 2003	Saint Paul	United States	Xcel Energy Center	79.4%
July 9, 2003	Chicago	United States	United Center	87.1%
July 11, 2003	Columbus	United States	Nationwide Arena	82.2%
July 12, 2003	Indianapolis	United States	Conseco Fieldhouse	59.1%
July 13, 2003	Cincinnati	United States	U.S. Bank Arena	66.34%
July 15, 2003	Pittsburgh	United States	Mellon Arena	77.6%
July 16, 2003	Wilkes-Barre	United States	First Union Arena	87.7%
July 18, 2003	Hartford	United States	Hartford Civic Center	100%
July 19, 2003	Buffalo	United States	HSBC Arena	73.9%
July 20, 2003	Detroit	United States	Joe Louis Arena	100%
July 22, 2003	Toronto	Canada	Air Canada Centre	100%
July 23, 2003	Cleveland	United States	CSU Convocation Center	100%
July 25, 2003	Worcester	United States	Worcester's Centrum Centre	100%
July 26, 2003	Worcester	United States	Worcester's Centrum Centre	100%
July 27, 2003	Philadelphia	United States	First Union Center	100%
July 28, 2003	Washington, D.C.	United States	MCI Center	100%
July 30, 2003	East Rutherford	United States	Continental Airlines Arena	100%
July 31, 2003	Uniondale	United States	Nassau Coliseum	100%
August 1, 2003	Uniondale	United States	Nassau Coliseum	100%
August 2, 2003	Providence	United States	Dunkin' Donuts Center	100%
August 4, 2003	Albany	United States	Pepsi Arena	100%
August 5, 2003	Richmond	United States	Richmond Coliseum	84.1%
August 6, 2003	Raleigh	United States	RBC Center	100%
August 8, 2003	Charlotte	United States	Charlotte Coliseum	100%
August 9, 2003	Atlanta	United States	Philips Arena	100%
August 10, 2003	Orlando	United States	TD Waterhouse Center	90.5%
August 12, 2003	Sunrise	United States	Office Depot Center	80.5%
August 13, 2003	Tampa	United States	St. Pete Times Forum	98.4%
August 15, 2003	Birmingham	United States	BJCC Arena	100%
August 16, 2003	Memphis	United States	Pyramid Arena	60.7%
August 17, 2003	St. Louis	United States	Savvis Center	67.3%
August 19, 2003	Dallas	United States	American Airlines Center	55.5%
August 20, 2003	Houston	United States	Compaq Center	52.2%
August 21, 2003	Oklahoma City	United States	Ford Center	47.7%
August 23, 2003	Salt Lake City	United States	Delta Center	63.7%
August 24, 2003	Boise	United States	Pavilion at BSU	41.5%
August 26, 2003	Seattle	United States	KeyArena	87.9%
August 27, 2003	Portland	United States	Rose Garden Arena	62.2%
August 28, 2003	Sacramento	United States	ARCO Arena	78.6%
August 30, 2003	San Jose	United States	HP Pavilion at San Jose	100%
August 31, 2003	Anaheim	United States	Arrowhead Pond	100%

== Response ==
This tour was an even greater success than the first one with sell-out shows in many cities. In total 411,005 tickets were sold, yielding a gross total of $15,977,802 as reported by Billboard, nearly doubling that of Season 1 tour.

== Tour summary ==
- Number of shows – 41 (19 sold out)
- Total gross – $15,977,802
- Total attendance – 411,005
- Average attendance – 10,025 (85%)
- Average ticket price – $38.87
- Highest gross – Detroit, Michigan – $545,543
- Lowest gross – Boise, Idaho – $121,455
- Highest attendance – Charlotte, North Carolina – 14,645 (100%)
- Lowest attendance – Boise, Idaho – 2,905 (41.5%)
