= American Idol Season 2: All-Time Classic American Love Songs =

American Idol Season 2: All Time Classic American Love Songs

Compilation album by American Idol Season 2 finalists
- Released: April 29, 2003
- Genre: Pop
- Label: RCA
- Producers: Burt Bacharach, James McMillan, Nigel Wright

American Idol chronology
Season 1: Greatest Moments (2002)	American Idol Season 2: All Time Classic American Love Songs (2003)	Season 3: Greatest Soul Classics (2004)

Season 2: All-Time Classic American Love Songs was compiled of classic American love songs performed by the top eleven finalists from season 2 of American Idol and contains two ensemble tracks. It was released in 2003.

The album debuted at No.2 on the Nielsen Soundscan U.S. album chart for the week ending May 4, 2003 with sales of 101,225 the first week. It was certified gold on May 30, 2003, and its total sales reached 648,000.

== Track listing ==
1. "What the World Needs Now is Love" (Burt Bacharach) – American Idol Season 2 Finalists
2. "Superstar" (The Carpenters) – Ruben Studdard
3. "On the Wings of Love" (Jeffrey Osborne) – Clay Aiken
4. "At Last" (Etta James) – Julia DeMato
5. "Three Times a Lady" (Commodores) – Josh Gracin
6. "Let's Stay Together" (Al Green) – Trenyce
7. "Back At One" (Brian McKnight) – Rickey Smith
8. "Killing Me Softly" (Roberta Flack) – Kimberly Caldwell
9. "Open Arms" (Journey) – Corey Clark
10. "How Do I Live" (LeAnn Rimes) – Carmen Rasmusen
11. "Over the Rainbow" (Judy Garland) – Kimberley Locke
12. "Overjoyed" (Stevie Wonder) – Charles Grigsby
13. "God Bless the USA" (Lee Greenwood) – American Idol Season 2 Finalists

== Charts ==
=== Weekly charts ===
Chart (2003)	Peak position
US Billboard 200	2
US Soundtrack Albums (Billboard)	1

=== Year-end charts ===
Chart (2003)	Position
US Billboard 200	121
US Soundtrack Albums (Billboard)	8
