= I Loved Her First (album) =

Studio album by Heartland
- Released: October 10, 2006
- Genre: Country
- Label: Lofton Creek
- Producer: Walt Aldridge

Singles from I Loved Her First
- 1. "I Loved Her First" Released: June 5, 2006; 2. "Built to Last" Released: 2007; 3. "Let's Get Dirty" Released: 2007

Professional ratings
Review scores
Source	Rating
Country Standard Time	

I Loved Her First is the only studio album by the American country music band Heartland. Issued in 2006, it includes the single "I Loved Her First", a number one on the Billboard Hot Country Songs charts. Also released from this album were the singles "Built to Last" (number 58 on Hot Country Songs) and "Let's Get Dirty" (failed to chart). The track "(There's) No Gettin' Over Me" is a cover version of Ronnie Milsap's number one country hit from 1981.

== Track listing ==
No.	Title	Writer(s)	Length
1.	"Boys Like Us"	Mike Geiger, Brad Martin, Frank J. Myers	3:42
2.	"Play Hurt"	Walt Aldridge, Brad Crisler, James LeBlanc	3:38
3.	"You"	Jason Sellers, Ray Stephenson	3:32
4.	"Built to Last"	Elliott Park	4:14
5.	"(There's) No Gettin' Over Me"	Aldridge, Tom Brasfield	3:03
6.	"Let's Get Dirty"	Aldridge, Anthony Little, Keith Ridenour	4:07
7.	"Too Country"	Neal Coty, Jon Henderson	3:21
8.	"Freebird in a Firebird"	Brandy Clark, Mark Narmore	3:51
9.	"I Loved Her First"	Aldridge, Park	3:32
10.	"Mississippi Mud"	Aldridge, Rodney Clawson	3:26
11.	"Judge a Man by the Woman"	Don Poythress, Barry Dean	4:22

== Personnel ==
=== Heartland ===
- Jason Albert – lead vocals
- Craig Anderson – acoustic guitar
- Todd Anderson – drums
- Chuck Crawford – fiddle, acoustic guitar, background vocals
- Mike Myerson – lead guitar
- Keith West – bass guitar, background vocals

=== Additional musicians ===
- Walt Aldridge
- Jim "Moose" Brown
- J. T. Corenflos
- Glen Duncan
- Larry Franklin
- Mark Matejka
- Danny Parks

== Chart performance ==
=== Weekly charts ===
Chart (2006)	Peak position
US Billboard 200	11
US Top Country Albums (Billboard)	3
US Independent Albums (Billboard)	1

=== Year-end charts ===
Chart (2006)	Position
US Top Country Albums (Billboard)	66
Chart (2007)	Position
US Top Country Albums (Billboard)	64

=== Singles ===
Year	Single	Peak chart positions	
Year	Single	US Country	US
2006	"I Loved Her First"	1	34
2007	"Built to Last"	58	—
2007	"Let's Get Dirty"	—	—
"—" denotes releases that did not chart
