= Keith Bryant =

American singer-songwriter

- Origin: Virginia, United States
- Occupation: Singer
- Instrument: Vocals
- Years active: 2000-present
- Labels: Traditions, Strait Off Da Chai, Lofton Creek, S&S Mack, Jordash

Keith Bryant (born in Virginia) is an American country music artist. In his career, he has released four independent studio albums, including one on Lofton Creek Records. He charted for the first time in 2004 with the single "Riding' with the Legend", which Bryant co-wrote as a tribute to former NASCAR driver Dale Earnhardt, who died in 2001. The song peaked at number 47 on the Hot Country Songs chart, becoming his first, and only charted single to date.

== Biography ==
Keith Bryant was born in the state of Virginia. By age fifteen, he had formed his own gospel band and began teaching himself piano. From there, he began playing in local bands as well. Bryant won best male vocalist at age 19 in the East Coast Country Music Championship, and then formed a band called Ironhorse.

In 2000, Bryant released his first solo album, The Secret to Life. Robert K. Oermann of MusicRow magazine gave the album a favorable review, awarding it the magazine's DISCovery award. A second album, Welcome to Love, followed two years later. By 2004, he had signed to Lofton Creek Records to release his third album, Ridin' with the Legend. Its title track was a tribute to Dale Earnhardt, a NASCAR driver who died in 2001. The song received airplay on country radio for ten months, in addition to spending fifteen weeks on the Billboard Hot Country Songs charts, where it peaked at No. 47. The album also sold more than 30,000 copies. "Ridin' with the Legend" was also made into a music video which aired on CMT and GAC. Bryant's fourth album, Live It Slow, followed in 2007 on the S&S Mack label. This album produced five singles, though none charted.

== Discography ==
=== Albums ===
Title	Album details
The Secret to Life	Release date: July 4, 2000; Label: Tandem Records
Welcome to Love	Release date: May 20, 2002; Label: Straight Off Da Chai
Ridin' with the Legend	Release date: July 13, 2004; Label: Lofton Creek Records
Live It Slow	Release date: March 6, 2007; Label: S&S Mack Records

=== Singles ===
Year	Single	Peak positions	Album
Year	Single	US Country	Album
2001	"Drivers in Heaven"	—	Drivers in Heaven
2002	"Welcome to Love"	—	Welcome to Love
2002	"Steady as the Rain"	—	Welcome to Love
2004	"Ridin' with the Legend"	47	Ridin' with the Legend
2005	"Somebody"	—	Live It Slow
2006	"Just the Way We Do It"	—	Live It Slow
2006	"Live It Slow"	—	Live It Slow
2007	"She Danced"	—	Live It Slow
2008	"Beautiful Liar"	—	Live It Slow
2011	"The Note"	—	Non-album songs
2011	"Can't Tell Somebody (Who to Love)"	—	Non-album songs
"—" denotes releases that did not chart

=== Music videos ===
Year	Video	Director
1998	"As I Lay Her Body Down"	
2002	"Steady As The Rain"	
2004	"Ridin' with the Legend"	
2005	"Somebody"	Lark Watts
2006	"Live It Slow"	Shen Shaw
