= Carmen Rasmusen =

Canadian-American country music artist (born 1985)

Carmen Rasmusen Herbert
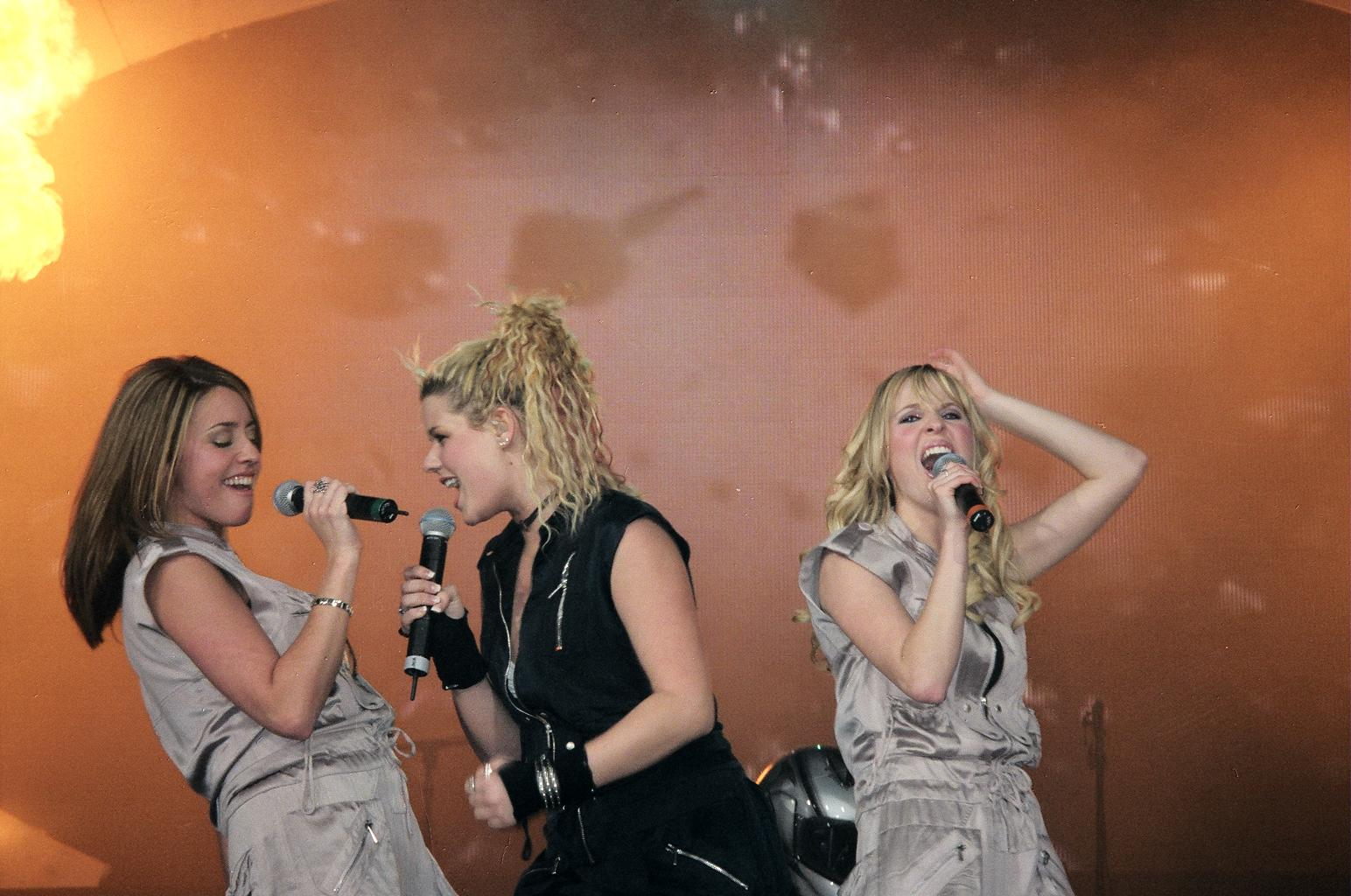
- American Idol 2 Concert Tour, 2003: (from left to right) Julia DeMato, Kimberly Caldwell and Carmen Rasmusen.

Background information
- Born: Carmen Rasmusen; March 25, 1985 (age 41); Edmonton, Alberta, Canada
- Genres: Country
- Occupations: Singer, songwriter, actress
- Label: R3, Lofton Creek
- Website: www.carmenrasmusen.com

Carmen Rasmusen Herbert (born March 25, 1985) is a Canadian-American country music artist who ranked sixth on the second season of American Idol in 2003. Rasmusen also plays piano and guitar.

== Early life ==
Rasmusen was born on March 25, 1985, in Edmonton and is of Norwegian heritage. She is a member of the Church of Jesus Christ of Latter-day Saints. The second of four children, Rasmusen has been performing in public since the age of five: singing, dancing (including cheerleading, tap, ballet and hip-hop dance), and playing the piano.

She graduated from Woods Cross High School in Northern Utah in 2003, and is an alumna of Brigham Young University.

== American Idol ==
Rasmusen auditioned initially in Los Angeles and was put through to Hollywood. She was originally eliminated by the judges during the Top 100 stage. In a surprise move, Rasmusen and three other young female singers were brought back to compete in the Wild Card show. No clear reason was made public, but speculation at the time centered on the show's producers wanting to provide a greater demographic diversity in the Final 12.

Rasmusen performed "Can't Fight the Moonlight" by LeAnn Rimes for her Wild Card performance. Although the judges, including Simon Cowell, opined that it was not a good enough performance to advance, the next night Cowell chose her as his "judge's choice" to move into the Top 12. Carmen survived for seven weeks in the finals, earning generally mixed reviews from the judges throughout her stay. Her performances of "You Can't Hurry Love" and "Turn the Beat Around" received relatively high marks from both judges and viewers, while her rendition of Blondie's "Call Me" during Billboard Number One Hits Night drew brickbats. Judge Randy Jackson was often one of her harshest critics.

Rasmusen was praised by her fans as having a wholesome, girlish appeal and for refusing to wear outfits she thought were inappropriate for her. Fans also cited her on-stage energy and strong vocal projection. Detractors pointed to her recurring difficulty in controlling her natural vibrato and her tendency to yodel when changing registers. She was also one of the most outspoken defenders of the show among the second season finalists in the wake of the scandal involving Corey Clark's allegations regarding Paula Abdul.

As the only contestant in the second season under the age of eighteen, she had to spend three hours a day with an on-set tutor. Her mother had to accompany her with the other contestants to the special American Idol house, where they all lived during the competition. She also became close friends with season 2 runner-up Clay Aiken.

After her elimination, she went on to appear in numerous shows promoting American Idol and she appeared on the last episode of the second season singing with the other finalists. Rasmusen also appeared on the American Idol Season 2: All-Time Classic American Love Songs singing "How Do I Live" by LeAnn Rimes.

In June 2008, Rasmusen starred as one of the headliners for a live music show in Branson, MO, called America's Favorite Finalists. The show featured six top 12 American Idol Finalists performing their own music, cover songs and group numbers. The show ran at the Grand Palace.

=== Performances ===
- Wildcards - "Can't Fight the Moonlight" by LeAnn Rimes
- Top 12 (Motown) - "You Can't Hurry Love" by The Supremes
- Top 11 (Movies) - "Hopelessly Devoted to You" by Olivia Newton-John
- Top 10 (Country Rock) - "Wild Angels" by Martina McBride
- Top 8 (Disco)^{1} - "Turn the Beat Around" by Vicki Sue Robinson (Bottom 2)
- Top 8 (Billboard Number One Hits) - "Call Me" by Blondie
- Top 7 (Billy Joel's Music) - "And So It Goes" (Bottom 2)
- Top 6 (Diane Warren's Music) - "Love Will Lead You Back" by Taylor Dayne (Eliminated)
- ^Note 1 Due to Corey Clark's disqualification, the Top 9 performances became Top 8 when no one was eliminated.

== Music career ==
=== Carmen ===
Her first EP, Carmen, was self-released and included her first single, Photograph.

=== Nothin' Like the Summer ===
Rasmusen signed with Lofton Creek Records. Her debut album, Nothin' Like the Summer was released on August 28, 2007, and the first single, "Nothin' Like the Summer", debuted in the United States on April 24, 2007 and also debuted in Shanghai, Australia and United Kingdom. The song was written by Rasmusen, Victoria Shaw and Jason Deere, who also produced both the song and her album.

== Acting career ==
Rasmusen made her acting debut in 2003 in the feature film Pride and Prejudice: A Latter-Day Comedy as Charlotte Lucas. In 2004, Carmen released an EP by R3 Records, Carmen.

Rasmusen also appeared in a three episode series of NBC's Fear Factor, aired on June 13, 2006 - June 27, 2006. In the first episode, she was teamed with Anthony Fedorov, and won the first challenge involving a demolition derby, ultimately winning a trip to Africa. She finished in second place.

In June 2006, Carmen played a news reporter in commercials for Maverik, a convenience store in the western USA.

== Personal life ==
On December 15, 2005, Carmen married Bradley Herbert, the son of former Utah Governor Gary R. Herbert in Bountiful, Utah. In December 2008, she gave birth to a son named Boston. Her second son, Beckham, was born on October 26, 2010.

Carmen currently writes an entertainment column for the Deseret News.

== Discography ==
=== Studio albums ===
Title	Details	Sales
Carmen (EP)	Release date: November 23, 2004; Re-Release date: June 5, 2006; Label: r3	US: 2,300
Nothin' Like the Summer	Release date: August 14, 2007 (iTunes); Release date: August 28, 2007 (Other); Label: Lofton Creek Records	US: 3,100

=== Singles ===
Year	Single	Album
2004	"Photograph"	Carmen (EP)
2007	"Nothin' Like the Summer"	Nothin' Like the Summer

=== Music videos ===
Year	Video	Director
2007	"Nothin' Like the Summer"	Roman White

== Filmography ==
- Pride & Prejudice: A Latter-Day Comedy (2003), as Charlotte Lucas
- Down and Derby (2005), as Marilyn
