= Allison Paige =

American singer-songwriter

- Birth name: Allison Paige McBryar
- Born: May 27, 1982 (age 42); Refugio, Texas
- Genres: Country
- Occupation: Singer
- Years active: 2000–2004
- Labels: Capitol Nashville, Lofton Creek

Allison Paige McBryar (born May 27, 1982) is an American country music singer.

== Early life ==
Paige was born in Refugio, Texas, and began performing in clubs in Texas with Whiskey River when she was 11 years old. She later joined the dancehall band Rhythm of the Road. She is of Italian descent.

== Recording career ==
Her first single, a cover of Skeeter Davis' "The End of the World", was released by Capitol Records Nashville and peaked at number 72 on the Billboard Hot Country Singles & Tracks chart in May 2000.

Paige's debut album, End of the World, was released by Lofton Creek Records in June 2004. A music video was filmed for the first single, "Send a Message."

== Discography ==
=== Albums ===
Title	Album details
End of the World	Release date: June 15, 2004; Label: Lofton Creek Records

=== Singles ===
Year	Single	Peak positions	Album
Year	Single	US Country	Album
2000	"The End of the World"	72	End of the World
2003	"Send a Message"	—	End of the World
2003	"Where My Heart Lets Go"	—	End of the World
2004	"The End of the World" (re-release)	—	End of the World
"—" denotes releases that did not chart

=== Music videos ===
Year	Video
2003	"Send a Message"
