= I Loved Her First =

Single by Heartland

from the album I Loved Her First
- Released: June 5, 2006
- Genre: Country
- Length: 3:32
- Label: Lofton Creek
- Songwriters: Walt Aldridge; Elliott Park
- Producer: Walt Aldridge

Heartland singles chronology
"I Loved Her First" (2006)	"Built to Last" (2007)

"I Loved Her First" is a song recorded by American country music band Heartland. It was released in June 2006 as the lead single from their debut studio album I Loved Her First (2006). The song reached No. 1 on the U.S. Billboard Hot Country Songs charts in late 2006, becoming the band's only number-one hit and only Top 40 hit on that chart. The song was written by Walt Aldridge and Elliott Park.

== Content ==
The song is a mid-tempo ballad in triple meter. In it, the male narrator is talking to the man who is about to marry his daughter, telling him that he is having difficulty giving her away because he "loved her first." The song is a signature Father-Daughter song to dance to at wedding receptions for numerous brides and their fathers.

== Critical reception ==
Deborah Evans Price, of Billboard magazine reviewed the song favorably, calling it a "beautifully written tearjerker that will hit home with dads everywhere who can't believe their little girls have grown up so soon." She calls Albert's performance "wonderful" and says that it "wrings every drop of emotion from the tender lyric."

== Music video ==
The music video was directed by Todd Schaffer and premiered in mid-2006. It features the group singing and a family at a wedding reception.

== Chart performance ==
"I Loved Her First" debuted at number 57 on the U.S. Billboard Hot Country Singles & Tracks for the week of July 8, 2006. Driven by a viral video of a father singing the ballad in sign language at his daughter's wedding, it reappeared on the chart almost nine years later at number 7 on the chart dated February 21, 2015. The song has sold over one million copies.

== Charts ==
=== Weekly charts ===
Chart (2006)	Peak position
US Hot Country Songs (Billboard)	1
US Billboard Hot 100	34
US Billboard Pop 100	56

Chart (2015)	Peak position
US Hot Country Songs (Billboard)	7

=== Year-end charts ===
Chart (2006)	Position
US Country Songs (Billboard)	30

== Certifications ==
Region	Certification	Certified units/sales
United States (RIAA)	Platinum	1,000,000^{‡}
^{‡} Sales+streaming figures based on certification alone.
