= You Can't Win (song) =

1979 single by Michael Jackson

Single by Michael Jackson

from the album The Wiz: Original Motion Picture Soundtrack
- A-side: "You Can't Win (Pt. 1)"
- B-side: "You Can't Win (Pt. 2)"
- Released: January 11, 1979
- Genre: Disco; R&B; pop; soul
- Length: 7:17
- Label: Epic
- Songwriter: Charlie Smalls
- Producer: Quincy Jones

Michael Jackson singles chronology
"Ease On down the Road" (1978)	"You Can't Win" (1979)	"A Brand New Day" (1979)

"You Can't Win" is an R&B, pop and soul song written by Charlie Smalls and performed by American recording artist Michael Jackson, who played Scarecrow in the 1978 musical film The Wiz, a retelling of L. Frank Baum's The Wonderful Wizard of Oz using African-American musical genres and cultural tropes. The movie featured an entirely African American cast and was based on the 1975 Broadway musical The Wiz.

After the original soundtrack version was recorded, Michael Jackson and Quincy Jones went back into the studio and re-recorded the track. It was the re-recording that was released in January 1979 as the second single from The Wiz: Original Motion Picture Soundtrack, following the release of "Ease On down the Road" in 1978, and was Michael's first solo chart single on Epic Records (despite the fact that the soundtrack album for The Wiz was released by Motown and the now-defunct MCA Records). The 7-inch version split the song in half, with "Part 1" as the A-side and "Part 2" as the B-side; the full-length version was released as a 12-inch single and later was included on The Ultimate Collection in 2004.

The single only charted in the United States, where it reached number 81 on the Billboard Hot 100 and number 42 on the R&B singles chart. Since its release, the song has been well received by music critics. The song has been performed by contemporary singers such as Jill Scott and Charles Grigsby.

In 1982 "Part 2" of "You Can't Win", in which Michael Jackson repeatedly sings the line "Can't get outta the game", was vocally overdubbed, and the resulting track was titled "Can't Get Outta the Rain"; it became the B-side of "The Girl Is Mine", the first single from Jackson's landmark album Thriller. Despite "Can't Get Outta the Rain" being melodically identical to "You Can't Win", as well as lyrically identical except for the word "rain", Jackson and Quincy Jones are credited as the song's composers, not Charlie Smalls.

== Composition ==
"You Can't Win" was originally written and performed during the pre-Broadway Baltimore run of the stage version of The Wiz in 1974, sung by the chorus of Winkies, the Wicked Witch's slaves. The number was cut from the musical before the official Broadway opening and wasn't performed again until the movie version was under consideration, 3 years later. The producers resurrected the song as a solo for Michael Jackson to replace "I Was Born on the Day Before Yesterday", which had been Scarecrow's solo in the Broadway musical. "You Can't Win" and its corresponding scene in the movie allude to mistreatment of African Americans. Jackson stated in his 1988 autobiography Moonwalk that the lyrics to "You Can't Win" are about humiliation and helplessness, feelings, he stated, that many people have experienced at one point in their life. The singer added that the song was also about "the feeling that there are people out there who don't actively hold you back as much as they work quietly on your insecurities so that you hold yourself back". "You Can't Win" opens with the lines, "You can't win, you can't break even, and you can't get out of the game. People keep sayin', things are gonna change, but they look just like they're staying the same." William F. Brown, who wrote the book for the Broadway musical, stated that such verses made "You Can't Win" a "black message song". Musically, the track has been described as an R&B, pop and soul song by Renée Graham of The Boston Globe. According to the sheet music published on Musicnotes.com by Alfred Music Publishing, the track was performed in common time, with a tempo of 80 beats per minute. The indicated key is E major with a range from B_{3} to C♯_{5}.

== In The Wiz ==
The scene that corresponds with "You Can't Win" in The Wiz begins with Dorothy Gale (played by Diana Ross) stumbling upon a scarecrow being heckled by crows while stuck in the air on a pole. Dorothy remains hidden while the crows mock Scarecrow for asking to be let down. They state that he will remain on the pole because that is his role and there is nothing to get down for. The crows tell Scarecrow that even if he was let down, he would not be able to walk as he is a "straw paper dummy". Scarecrow tries to reason with the birds by reading relevant quotations from figures such as Francis Bacon and Cicero as a rationale to be freed. The crows do not relent, however, and make him recite their "Crow Commandments": "Thou shall honor all crows", "Thou shall stop reading all bits of paper and literature" and "Thou shall never, never get down off of this here pole". In addition, the birds tell Scarecrow to sing the crow anthem, "You Can't Win". After the song concludes, Dorothy comes out of hiding and releases Scarecrow from the pole. Together, they then dance their way down the yellow brick road in search of The Wiz, singing "Ease On down the Road" as they go.

The song is also heard in The Wiz Live!, replacing "I Was Born on the Day Before Yesterday".

=== Analysis ===
Elwood Watson, author of Pimps, Wimps, Studs, Thugs and Gentlemen: Essays on Media Images of Masculinity, states that The Wiz offers an "important allegorical treatment of ordinary African American men living in the wake of the Civil Rights Movement". Watson writes that while the crows do not intend to cause physical harm to Scarecrow, the beginning of their scene recalls experiences of the ritual lynching of black men in the United States. The author states that the crows' refusal to allow Scarecrow to read literature was reminiscent of laws that forbade black slaves from being educated. Watson writes, "Scarecrow's desire for knowledge that will help him interpret the discourses and institutions that shape his life signifies on the slave narrative. With its emphasis on literacy and freedom, African American slave narratives document that for many African Americans literacy was understood as an essential path to freedom." Watson continues:

The Crows' insistence that reading is useless, even dangerous for Scarecrow because it only leads to discontentment takes on an especially haunting reminder of the ways in which the residues of slavery continue to injure contemporary African Americans. The Crows reinforce Scarecrow's subjection at their hands through a song whose refrain "you can't win child, you can't get out of the game" that aims to disabuse Scarecrow of any aspirations toward freedom ... Their insistence that "reading is stupid" suggests that a Eurocentric education does not promise liberation from "the game" that race and racism create ... The Crow's dismissal of education and western thought fails because they do not offer Scarecrow an alternative that will emancipate him. The Crow's attempt to discipline Scarecrow by displacing his hope with nihilism. For The Crow's so-called book of knowledge is less valuable than what they perceive to be real knowledge-street smarts. Though they are not tethered to a pole, they are seemingly unable or as their commandments and anthem suggests, unwilling to find opportunities than their present location provides. The Crow's chorus to Scarecrow's song is revealing for what it says about their loss of hope ... The Crow's are even more disadvantaged than Scarecrow because, unlike him, they are hopeless. The Crow's chorus, like The Crow Commandments, reflects their disillusionment with their inability to realize the promise of upward mobility.

Watson continued his analysis, writing that despite the crows' attempts to erode Scarecrow's confidence, "[he] gives no indication that he intends to abort his efforts to liberate himself physically and intellectually." Watson concluded his study of Scarecrow and his scene by stating, "His encounter with Dorothy will help him to realize, contrary to The Crow's assertions, that Scarecrow's pursuit of knowledge can indeed help him to win opportunities for improving his life."

== Release and reception ==
In January 1979, "You Can't Win" was released as the second single from The Wiz: Original Motion Picture Soundtrack, a double album distributed by Motown Records in September 1978. The single was issued after the September 1978 release of "Ease On down the Road", a duet between Jackson and Diana Ross, who played protagonist Dorothy Gale in The Wiz. "You Can't Win" was distributed under Epic Records, and was Jackson's first solo single issued by the company after Epic executives signed him and his brothers to the label in 1976. "You Can't Win" entered Billboard's R&B singles chart on January 20, 1979. It reached number 42 and remained in the chart for ten weeks. A month later, on February 24, 1979, it entered the Billboard Hot 100, where it peaked at number 81. The single stayed in the chart for three weeks. In May 1979, "You Can't Win" was released in Britain, as was a 7" picture disc of the song. The single failed to enter the British charts. When Jackson's Off the Wall was first released in August 1979, the picture disc supplemented the album.

Since its release, "You Can't Win" has received positive reviews from music critics. A journalist from the Kansas City Star said that the song was the best one from The Wiz. Kenny Mack of the Santa Monica Daily Press asserted that Jackson's "famous vulnerability and the power of his voice on 'You Can't Win' combined for perfect casting" in the film. The Boston Globe's Renée Graham stated in 2005, "Halfway through the [song], Jackson lets out a whoop, and the tune evolves from a pop-soul confection into a true R&B delight, spiced with barking horns and hand-claps as funky and loose as anything Jackson has ever done." Writer Geoff Brown wrote in his book Michael Jackson: A Life in Music that the singer's performance of "You Can't Win" in The Wiz was "one of the few bright moments in a drab remake of The Wizard of Oz". Margo Jefferson wrote in the biography On Michael Jackson that the entertainer sang the song in the film with "rough, gospel edges of desperation". She added, "The torment feels genuine. It's a painful scene." After Jackson's death in 2009, Edmund W. Lewis of The Louisiana Weekly said that he was "still amazed at the quality of [the singer]'s performance in The Wiz". He added, "As the scarecrow, he sang the hell out of [the song]."

== Legacy ==
"You Can't Win" has been referenced and performed on several occasions. In the 1982 blockbuster film E.T. the Extra-Terrestrial, a snippet of the song is heard on a car radio. In 2001 Jill Scott performed the song during the Michael Jackson: 30th Anniversary Special celebration. In 2003, during the second season of American Idol, contestant Charles Grigsby sang "You Can't Win" for a movie theme night. An Entertainment Weekly writer said that the song choice was "oddly appropriate", as the hopeful was eliminated from the competition after the performance. Decades after the release of "You Can't Win", William F. Brown stated that the song had been dropped from his theater productions of The Wiz. He said this was because the musical was not a black message show, but a show for everybody to enjoy. He expressed the opinion that "You Can't Win" was no longer relevant, stating, "[It's] all changed. Black people can win." The song was performed by Antoine L. Smith and Tavon Olds-Sample on the cast recording of the Jukebox musical MJ the Musical

== Track listings ==
Limited edition picture disc – 7-inch single

- "You Can't Win (Pt. 1)" – 3:43
- "You Can't Win (Pt. 2)" – 2:58

== Charts ==
Chart performance for "You Can't Win"
Chart (1979)	Peak position
US Billboard Hot 100	81
US Hot R&B/Hip-Hop Songs (Billboard)	42

== Bibliography ==
- Brooks, Darren (2002). Michael Jackson: An Exceptional Journey. Chrome Dreams. ISBN 1-84240-178-5.
- Brown, Geoff (2009). Michael Jackson: A Life in Music. Omnibus Press. ISBN 978-1-84938-263-2.
- Campbell, Lisa (1993). Michael Jackson: The King of Pop. Branden. ISBN 0-8283-1957-X.
- George, Nelson (2004). Michael Jackson: The Ultimate Collection booklet. Sony BMG.
- Grant, Adrian (2009). Michael Jackson: The Visual Documentary. Omnibus Press. ISBN 978-1-84938-261-8.
- Jackson, Michael (2009). Moonwalk. Random House Inc. ISBN 978-0-307-71698-9.
- Jefferson, Margo (2006). On Michael Jackson. First Vintage Books Edition. ISBN 978-0-307-27765-7.
- Jones, Jel (2005). Michael Jackson, the King of Pop: The Big Picture: the Music! the Man! the Legend! the Interviews!. Amber Books Publishing. ISBN 0-9749779-0-X.
- Jones, Quincy (2002). Q: The Autobiography of Quincy Jones. Broadway Books. ISBN 0-7679-0510-5.
- Taraborrelli, J. Randy (2004). The Magic and the Madness. Headline. ISBN 0-330-42005-4.
- Watson, Elwood (2009). Pimps, Wimps, Studs, Thugs and Gentlemen: Essays on Media Images of Masculinity. McFarland. ISBN 978-0-7864-4305-5.
- White, Adam (1993). The Billboard book of number one rhythm & blues hits. Billboard Books. ISBN 0-8230-8285-7.
