= American Idol season 2 =

American Idol
- Season 2
- Hosted by: Ryan Seacrest
- Judges: Paula Abdul; Simon Cowell; Randy Jackson
- Winner: Ruben Studdard
- Runner-up: Clay Aiken
- Finals venue: Gibson Amphitheatre

Release
- Original network: Fox
- Original release: January 21 – May 21, 2003

Season chronology
- ← Previous; Season 1 Next → Season 3

The second season of American Idol premiered on January 21, 2003, and continued until May 21, 2003. The title of show was shortened from American Idol: The Search for a Superstar to just American Idol. Ryan Seacrest returned as the host after Brian Dunkleman quit after the previous season, and Seacrest became the lone host beginning with this season.

The second season was won by Ruben Studdard, who defeated Clay Aiken by 134,000 votes out of the 24 million votes recorded.

Studdard released his coronation song "Flying Without Wings" after the show, which reached number two on the U.S. Billboard Hot 100. Aiken also released a single with "This Is the Night." He was the first non-winning contestant to have a Billboard Hot 100 number one. It was also the biggest U.S. single of 2003, selling over one million copies and reaching six times platinum status in Canada as well as number one in New Zealand.

In addition to Studdard and Aiken, Kimberley Locke, Joshua Gracin, Kimberly Caldwell, and Carmen Rasmusen all signed with various record labels.

== Regional auditions ==
Auditions were held in the fall of 2002 in the following cities:

American Idol (season 2) – regional auditions
City	Date(s)	Audition venue	Callback venue	Golden tickets
Detroit, Michigan	October 21, 2002	Atheneum Suites Hotel		22
New York City, New York	October 24–28, 2002	Regent Wall Street Hotel	Rhiga Royal Hotel	35
Atlanta, Georgia	October 27, 2002	AmericasMart	Callanwolde Fine Arts Center	46
Nashville, Tennessee	October 30, 2002	Nashville Municipal Auditorium	Wildhorse Saloon	30
Miami, Florida	November 2–6, 2002	Fontainebleau Hilton Hotel		20
Austin, Texas	November 6–10, 2002	Doubletree Hotel	Hyatt Regency	36
Los Angeles, California	November 18–20, 2002	Rose Bowl	Renaissance Hollywood Hotel	45
Total number of tickets to Hollywood				234

The number of auditions increased significantly after the success of the first season, and arenas and stadiums began to be used to hold the first auditions from this season onward. Around 70,000 attended auditions this season and 234 were selected to proceed on to the Hollywood round. Radio DJ Angie Martinez was originally signed up as a fourth judge, but quit after a few days, stating that "it became too uncomfortable for me to tell someone else to give up on their dream."

Amber Riley was rejected by producers and did not get to audition for the judges, but later went on to co-star on the television series Glee as Mercedes Jones.

== Hollywood week ==
The contestants performed in a series of rounds and the number of contestants trimmed was in each round. In the first round, the 234 contestants performed a song, after which 114 were eliminated. In the second round, the top 120 contestants were asked to compose a melody for one of five sets of lyrics, and 40 more were cut. In the third round, the contestants were separated by gender and performed in small groups. The remaining 48 boys chose from The Carpenters' "Superstar," Seal's "Kiss from a Rose," and Barry Manilow's "Tryin' to Get the Feeling Again," while the remaining 32 girls chose from Melissa Manchester's "Don't Cry Out Loud," Freda Payne's "Band of Gold," and Dionne Warwick's "You'll Never Get to Heaven (If You Break My Heart)."

In the last round, each of the top 48 contestants performed solo. After their performances, the contestants were then divided into three groups of sixteen and placed in separate rooms. One group was eliminated, and 32 contestants proceeded on to the top 32.

== Top 32 ==
The format changed slightly in the second season; instead of three groups of ten, the top 32 contestants were grouped into four groups of eight. The contestants performed solo on a new and improved stage with piano accompaniment by Michael Orland, and the performances were pre-taped. There was no live audience, although family members of contestants were present in the Red Room where the contestants were placed.

The results of the public vote were announced live the next day. From each group, two were selected to proceed on to the top 12. Nine of those who failed at any of previous stages, including the Hollywood rounds and the initial regional auditions, were given one more chance to perform again in the Wild Card show. Each of the three judges put one contestant from the Wild Card group through to the top 12, with the final one selected by the public vote.

Color key:

This contestant was chosen by the public to advance.
This contestant was not chosen by the public, and had to perform again for the judges.
This contestant was not chosen by the public, but was chosen by the judges as a Wild Card pick.
This contestant was eliminated.

Contestants are listed in the order they performed.

=== Group 1 (February 5) ===
Contestant	Song	Result
Kimberly Caldwell	"Come to My Window"	Wild Card (3rd)
Patrick Fortson	"Un-Break My Heart"	Eliminated
J. D. Adams	"All in Love Is Fair"	Eliminated
Trenyce	"Love Sneakin' Up On You"	Wild Card
Meosha Denton	"How Do I Live"	Eliminated
Bettis Richardson	"Thank You"	Eliminated
Charles Grigsby	"Overjoyed"	Safe
Julia DeMato	"Son of a Preacher Man"	Safe

=== Group 2 (February 12) ===
Contestant	Song	Result
Clay Aiken	"Open Arms"	Wild Card (3rd)
Candice Coleman	"Piece of My Heart"	Eliminated
Rebecca Bond	"Caught Up in the Rapture"	Eliminated
Jacob John Smalley	"Anytime"	Eliminated
Hadas	"You Light Up My Life"	Eliminated
Ruben Studdard	"Superstar"	Safe
Kimberley Locke	"Over the Rainbow"	Safe
Jennifer Fuentes	"I Wanna Dance with Somebody (Who Loves Me)"	Eliminated

=== Group 3 (February 19) ===
Contestant	Song	Result
Kimberly Kelsey	"It's All Coming Back to Me Now"	Eliminated
Jordan Segundo	"For Your Love"	Eliminated
Vanessa Olivarez	"Out Here on My Own"	Safe
Rickey Smith	"One Last Cry"	Safe
Samantha Cohen	"Something He Can Feel"	Eliminated
Louis Gazzara	"How Am I Supposed to Live Without You"	Eliminated
Equoia Coleman	"The Way We Were"	Eliminated (3rd)
George Trice	"Unchained Melody"	Eliminated

=== Group 4 (February 26) ===
Contestant	Song	Result
Sylvia Chibiliti	"Didn't We Almost Have It All"	Eliminated
Chip Days	"A Song for You"	Wild Card
Juanita Barber	"What About the Children"	Eliminated
Patrick Lake	"When I See You Smile"	Eliminated (3rd)
Nasheka Siddall	"Open My Heart"	Wild Card
Josh Gracin	"I'll Be"	Safe
Ashley Hartman	"Touch Me in the Morning"	Eliminated
Corey Clark	"Foolish Heart"	Safe

=== Wild Card round (March 5) ===
Contestant	Song	Result
Kimberly Caldwell	"I Feel the Earth Move"	Saved (Note: Randy Jackson's Wild Card choice)
Clay Aiken	"Don't Let the Sun Go Down on Me"	Safe
Nasheka Siddall	"Wind Beneath My Wings"	Eliminated
Carmen Rasmusen	"Can't Fight the Moonlight"	Saved (Note: Simon Cowell's Wild Card choice)
Olivia Mojica	"Because You Loved Me"	Eliminated
Janine Falsone	"We Belong"	Eliminated
Chip Days	"Rock with You"	Eliminated
Aliceyn Cooney	"Angel"	Eliminated
Trenyce	"Let's Stay Together"	Saved (Note: Paula Abdul's Wild Card choice)

== Top 12 contestants ==
Back - Joshua Gracin, Clay Aiken, Kimberly Caldwell, Kimberley Locke, Charles Grigsby, Carmen Rusmusen, Trenyce, Ruben Studdard Seated - Julia DeMato, Corey Clark, Vanessa Olivarez, Rickey Smith

- Ruben Studdard (born September 12, 1978, in Frankfurt, Germany; 24 years old at the time of the show) was from Birmingham, Alabama, and auditioned in Nashville with Stevie Wonder's "Ribbon in the Sky."
- Clay Aiken (born November 30, 1978, in Raleigh, North Carolina; 24 years old at the time of the show) auditioned in Atlanta with Heatwave's "Always and Forever."
- Kimberley Locke (born January 3, 1978, in Hartsville, Tennessee; 25 years old at the time of the show) was from Nashville, Tennessee, where she auditioned with Judy Garland's "Over the Rainbow."
- Joshua Gracin (born October 18, 1980, in Westland, Michigan; 22 years old at the time of the show) was from Oceanside, California, where he was stationed while serving in the Marine Corps. He auditioned in Los Angeles with O-Town's "All or Nothing."
- Trenyce (born March 31, 1980, in Memphis, Tennessee; 22 years old at the time of the show) was from Bartlett, Tennessee, and auditioned in Nashville with Whitney Houston's "I Learned from the Best."
- Carmen Rasmusen (born March 25, 1985, in Edmonton, Canada; 17 years old at the time of the show) was from Bountiful, Utah, and auditioned in Los Angeles. She did not make the semifinal initially, but was brought back for the Wild Card round and made it to the top 12.
- Kimberly Caldwell (born February 25, 1982, in Katy, Texas; 20 years old at the time of the show) auditioned in Austin with Stevie Wonder's "Superstition". She learned of her participation as a Wild Card contestant on her 21st birthday.
- Rickey Smith (born May 10, 1979 in Keene, Texas; 23 years old at the time of the show) auditioned in Nashville with Brian McKnight's "One Last Cry".
- Corey Clark (born July 13, 1980, in San Bernardino, California; 22 years old at the time of the show) auditioned in Nashville with The Jackson 5's "Never Can Say Goodbye." He was disqualified hours after the website The Smoking Gun revealed his misdemeanor charges of battery and resisting arrest on March 31, 2003.
- Julia DeMato (born March 7, 1979, in Danbury, Connecticut; 24 years old at the time of the show) was from Brookfield, Connecticut, and auditioned with Toni Braxton's "Un-Break My Heart."
- Charles Grigsby (born September 15, 1978, in Oberlin, Ohio; 24 years old at the time of the show) auditioned in Detroit.
- Vanessa Olivarez (born April 7, 1981; 21 years old at the time of the show) was from Atlanta, Georgia, where she auditioned with Queen's "Bohemian Rhapsody."

== Live Shows ==
Color key:

This contestant was saved by the public vote.
This contestant was in the bottom two or three, but was saved by the public vote.
This contestant was eliminated.
This contestant won American Idol.
This contestant was the runner-up.

=== Top 12 – Motown (March 12) ===
Lamont Dozier served as a guest judge this week. Contestants are listed in the order they performed.

Contestant	Motown song	Result
Kimberley Locke	"Heat Wave"	Bottom three
Joshua Gracin	"Baby I Need Your Loving"	Safe
Charles Grigsby	"How Sweet It Is (To Be Loved by You)"	Safe
Kimberly Caldwell	"Nowhere to Run"	Safe
Rickey Smith	"1-2-3"	Safe
Julia DeMato	"Where Did Our Love Go"	Bottom two
Clay Aiken	"I Can't Help Myself (Sugar Pie Honey Bunch)"	Safe
Vanessa Olivarez	"You Keep Me Hangin' On"	Eliminated
Corey Clark	"This Old Heart of Mine (Is Weak for You)"	Safe
Carmen Rasmusen	"You Can't Hurry Love"	Safe
Trenyce	"Come See About Me"	Safe
Ruben Studdard	"Baby I Need Your Loving"	Safe

Non-competition performance
Performers	Song
Top 12	"Heat Wave"

=== Top 11 – Movie soundtracks (March 19) ===
Gladys Knight served as a guest judge this week. Contestants are listed in the order they performed.

Contestant	Song	Film	Result
Corey Clark	"Against All Odds (Take a Look at Me Now)"	Against All Odds	Bottom two
Ruben Studdard	"A Whole New World"	Aladdin	Safe
Trenyce	"I Have Nothing"	The Bodyguard	Safe
Clay Aiken	"Somewhere Out There"	An American Tail	Safe
Kimberly Caldwell	"The Shoop Shoop Song (It's in His Kiss)"	Mermaids	Safe
Joshua Gracin	"I Don't Want to Miss a Thing"	Armageddon	Safe
Carmen Rasmusen	"Hopelessly Devoted to You"	Grease	Safe
Charles Grigsby	"You Can't Win"	The Wiz	Eliminated
Rickey Smith	"It Might Be You"	Tootsie	Safe
Julia DeMato	"Flashdance... What a Feeling"	Flashdance	Bottom three
Kimberley Locke	"Home"	The Wiz	Safe

Non-competition performances
Performers	Song
Top 11	"Footloose"
Top 11	"(I've Had) The Time of My Life"
Kelly Clarkson	"Anytime"

=== Top 10 – Country rock (March 26) ===
Olivia Newton-John served as a guest judge this week. Contestants are listed in the order they performed.

Contestant	Country rock song	Result
Joshua Gracin	"Ain't Goin' Down ('Til The Sun Comes Up)"	Safe
Trenyce	"I Need You"	Safe
Kimberley Locke	"I Can't Make You Love Me"	Safe
Corey Clark	"Drift Away"	Safe (Note: Corey Clark was disqualified before the following week's performance.)
Carmen Rasmusen	"Wild Angels"	Safe
Rickey Smith	"I've Done Enough Dyin' Today"	Bottom three
Kimberly Caldwell	"Anymore"	Bottom two
Ruben Studdard	"Sweet Home Alabama"	Safe
Julia DeMato	"Breathe"	Eliminated
Clay Aiken	"Someone Else's Star"	Safe

Non-competition performances
Performers	Song
Top 10	"Where the Blacktop Ends"
Top 10	"God Bless the U.S.A."

=== Top 8 – Disco (April 1) ===
Verdine White served as a guest judge this week. Because of Corey Clark's disqualification, no one was eliminated after this round. Contestants are listed in the order they performed.

Contestant	Disco song	Result
Rickey Smith	"Let's Groove"	Safe
Carmen Rasmusen	"Turn the Beat Around"	Bottom two (Note: It was never revealed whether Trenyce or Carmen had received the fewest number of votes that week as both were declared safe.)
Kimberly Caldwell	"Knock on Wood"	Safe
Clay Aiken	"Everlasting Love"	Safe
Trenyce	"I'm Every Woman"	Bottom two
Ruben Studdard	"Can't Get Enough of Your Love, Babe"	Safe
Kimberley Locke	"It's Raining Men"	Bottom three
Joshua Gracin	"Celebration"	Safe

Non-competition performances
Performers	Song
Top 8	"A Night to Remember"
Top 8	"Boogie Wonderland"
Lee Greenwood	"God Bless the U.S.A."

=== Top 8 – Billboard number ones (April 9) ===
Lionel Richie served as a guest judge this week. Contestants performed one song from the list of Billboard number one hits, and are listed in the order they performed.

Contestant	Song	Result
Clay Aiken	"At This Moment"	Safe
Kimberley Locke	"My Heart Will Go On"	Bottom three
Rickey Smith	"Endless Love"	Eliminated
Kimberly Caldwell	"(Everything I Do) I Do It for You"	Bottom two
Joshua Gracin	"Amazed"	Safe
Carmen Rasmusen	"Call Me"	Safe
Trenyce	"The Power of Love"	Safe
Ruben Studdard	"Kiss and Say Goodbye"	Safe

Non-competition performances
Performers	Song
Top 8	"All Night Long (All Night)"
Kelly Clarkson	"Miss Independent"

=== Top 7 – Billy Joel (April 16) ===
Smokey Robinson served as a guest judge this week. Contestants performed songs from the Billy Joel discography, and are listed in the order they performed. Joel did not mentor the contestants, but did record snippets in which he reflected upon the songwriting backstory of each song choice.

Contestant	Billy Joel song	Result
Kimberly Caldwell	"It's Still Rock and Roll to Me"	Eliminated
Ruben Studdard	"Just the Way You Are"	Safe
Kimberley Locke	"New York State of Mind"	Safe
Carmen Rasmusen	"And So It Goes"	Bottom two
Joshua Gracin	"Piano Man"	Safe
Trenyce	"Baby Grand"	Bottom three
Clay Aiken	"Tell Her About It"	Safe

Non-competition performances
Performers	Song
Top 7	"The Longest Time"
Top 7	"God Bless the U.S.A." (Note: Worth noting is that "God Bless the U.S.A." is not a Billy Joel song.)

=== Top 6 – Diane Warren (April 23) ===
Diane Warren served as this week's guest mentor and guest judge. Contestants are listed in the order they performed.

Contestant	Diane Warren song	Result
Kimberley Locke	"If You Asked Me To"	Safe
Clay Aiken	"I Could Not Ask for More"	Safe
Trenyce	"Have You Ever?"	Bottom three
Joshua Gracin	"That's When I'll Stop Loving You"	Bottom two
Carmen Rasmusen	"Love Will Lead You Back"	Eliminated
Ruben Studdard	"Music of My Heart"	Safe

Non-competition performance
Performers	Song
Top 6	"Shine"

=== Top 5 – Music from the 1960s & Neil Sedaka (April 30) ===
Neil Sedaka served as a guest judge this week. Contestants performed two songs each: one from the 1960s and one from the Neil Sedaka discography. Contestants are listed in the order they performed.

Contestant	Order	Song	Result
Ruben Studdard	1	"Ain't Too Proud to Beg"	Bottom two
Ruben Studdard	6	"Breaking Up Is Hard to Do"	Bottom two
Trenyce	2	"Proud Mary"	Eliminated
Trenyce	7	"Love Will Keep Us Together"	Eliminated
Joshua Gracin	3	"Then You Can Tell Me Goodbye"	Safe
Joshua Gracin	8	"Bad Blood"	Safe
Kimberley Locke	4	"I Heard It Through the Grapevine"	Safe
Kimberley Locke	9	"Where the Boys Are"	Safe
Clay Aiken	5	"Build Me Up Buttercup"	Safe
Clay Aiken	10	"Solitaire"	Safe

Non-competition performances
Performers	Song
Top 5	1960s medley
Top 10	"What the World Needs Now Is Love"
Justin Guarini	"I Saw Your Face"

=== Top 4 – Bee Gees (May 7) ===
Robin Gibb served as a guest judge this week. Contestants performed two songs each from the Bee Gees discography, and are listed in the order they performed.

Contestant	Order	Bee Gees song	Result
Joshua Gracin	1	"Jive Talkin'"	Eliminated
Joshua Gracin	5	"To Love Somebody"	Eliminated
Clay Aiken	2	"To Love Somebody"	Safe
Clay Aiken	6	"Grease"	Safe
Kimberley Locke	3	"I Just Want to Be Your Everything"	Bottom two
Kimberley Locke	7	"Emotion"	Bottom two
Ruben Studdard	4	"Nights on Broadway"	Safe
Ruben Studdard	8	"How Can You Mend a Broken Heart"	Safe

Non-competition performance
Performers	Song
Top 4	Bee Gees medley

=== Top 3 (May 14) ===
Contestants performed three songs each: one drawn "randomly" from a fishbowl (ie. chosen by the show's producers), one chosen by one of the judges, and one chosen by the contestant. Contestants are listed in the order they performed.

Contestant	Order	Song	Result
Kimberley Locke	1	"Band of Gold" (Note: This song was drawn "randomly" from a fishbowl.)	Eliminated
Kimberley Locke	4	"Anyone Who Had a Heart" (Note: Song chosen by Randy Jackson)	Eliminated
Kimberley Locke	7	"Inseparable"	Eliminated
Ruben Studdard	2	"Signed, Sealed, Delivered I'm Yours"	Safe
Ruben Studdard	5	"Smile" (Note: Song chosen by Simon Cowell)	Safe
Ruben Studdard	8	"If Ever You're in My Arms Again"	Safe
Clay Aiken	3	"Vincent"	Safe
Clay Aiken	6	"Mack the Knife" (Note: Song chosen by Paula Abdul)	Safe
Clay Aiken	9	"Unchained Melody"	Safe

Non-competition performances
Performers	Song
Top 3	"Up Where We Belong"
Top 3	"Reunited"
Top 3	"Solid"
Tamyra Gray	"Over the Rainbow"
Justin Guarini	"Unchained Melody"

=== Top 2 – Finale (May 21) ===
The two finalists performed three songs each.

Contestant	Order	Song	Result
Ruben Studdard	1	"A House is Not a Home"	Winner
Ruben Studdard	3	"Imagine"	Winner
Ruben Studdard	5	"Flying Without Wings"	Winner
Clay Aiken	2	"This Is the Night"	Runner-up
Clay Aiken	4	"Here, There and Everywhere"	Runner-up
Clay Aiken	6	"Bridge over Troubled Water"	Runner-up

Non-competition performances
Performers	Song
Paul Anka	"My Way"
Top 12 (Note: Corey Clark and Joshua Gracin were absent from the finale.) with Kelly Clarkson	"One Voice"
Kelly Clarkson	"Miss Independent"
Top 12	Medley: "Let's Groove" "Baby Love" "The Tears of a Clown" "Midnight Train to Georgia" "Words" "Physical" "That's When the Music Takes Me" "Hello" "Rhythm of the Night"
Ruben Studdard, Clay Aiken & Kimberley Locke	"Superstar" "Over the Rainbow" "On the Wings of Love"
Ruben Studdard	"Flying Without Wings"
Clay Aiken	"Bridge over Troubled Water"
Ruben Studdard & Clay Aiken	"Ain't No Stoppin' Us Now"

== Elimination chart ==
Color key:

Winner
Runner-up
Saved by the public
Saved by the judges
Wild Card
Bottom two or three
Did not perform
Disqualified
Eliminated

American Idol (season 2) - Eliminations
Contestant	Pl.	Semifinals				Wild Card	Top 12	Top 11	Top 10	Top 8		Top 7	Top 6	Top 5	Top 4	Top 3	Finale
Contestant	Pl.	2/5	2/12	2/19	2/26	3/5	3/12	3/19	3/26	4/1 (Note: None of the bottom three were eliminated due to Corey Clark's disqualification.)	4/9	4/16	4/23	4/30	5/7	5/14	5/21
Ruben Studdard	1	N/A	Safe	N/A	N/A	N/A	Safe	Safe	Safe	Safe	Safe	Safe	Safe	Bottom two	Safe	Safe	Winner
Clay Aiken	2	N/A	Wild Card (3rd)	N/A	N/A	Saved	Safe	Safe	Safe	Safe	Safe	Safe	Safe	Safe	Safe	Safe	Runner-up
Kimberley Locke	3	N/A	Safe	N/A	N/A	N/A	Bottom three	Safe	Safe	Bottom three	Bottom three	Safe	Safe	Safe	Bottom two	Eliminated	
Joshua Gracin	4	N/A	N/A	N/A	Safe	N/A	Safe	Safe	Safe	Safe	Safe	Safe	Bottom two	Safe	Eliminated		
Trenyce	5	Wild Card	N/A	N/A	N/A	Saved	Safe	Safe	Safe	Bottom two	Safe	Bottom three	Bottom three	Eliminated			
Carmen Rasmusen	6					Saved	Safe	Safe	Safe	Bottom two	Safe	Bottom two	Eliminated				
Kimberly Caldwell	7	Wild Card (3rd)	N/A	N/A	N/A	Saved	Safe	Safe	Bottom two	Safe	Bottom two	Eliminated					
Rickey Smith	8	N/A	N/A	Safe	N/A	N/A	Safe	Safe	Bottom three	Safe	Eliminated						
Corey Clark	9	N/A	N/A	N/A	Safe	N/A	Safe	Bottom two	Safe	Disqualified							
Julia DeMato	10	Safe	N/A	N/A	N/A	N/A	Bottom two	Bottom three	Eliminated								
Charles Grigsby	11	Safe	N/A	N/A	N/A	N/A	Safe	Eliminated									
Vanessa Olivarez	12	N/A	N/A	Safe	N/A	N/A	Eliminated										
Aliceyn Cooney						Eliminated											
Chip Days		N/A	N/A	N/A	Wild Card	Eliminated											
Janine Falsone						Eliminated											
Olivia Mojica						Eliminated											
Nasheka Siddall		N/A	N/A	N/A	Wild Card	Eliminated											
Juanita Barber		N/A	N/A	N/A	Eliminated												
Sylvia Chibiliti		N/A	N/A	N/A	Eliminated												
Ashley Hartman		N/A	N/A	N/A	Eliminated												
Patrick Lake		N/A	N/A	N/A	Eliminated (3rd)												
Samantha Cohen		N/A	N/A	Eliminated													
Equoia Coleman		N/A	N/A	Eliminated (3rd)													
Louis Gazzara		N/A	N/A	Eliminated													
Kimberly Kelsey		N/A	N/A	Eliminated													
Jordan Segundo		N/A	N/A	Eliminated													
George Trice		N/A	N/A	Eliminated													
Rebecca Bond		N/A	Eliminated														
Candice Coleman		N/A	Eliminated														
Jennifer Fuentes		N/A	Eliminated														
Hadas		N/A	Eliminated														
Jacob John Smalley		N/A	Eliminated														
J.D. Adams		Eliminated															
Meosha Denton		Eliminated															
Patrick Fortson		Eliminated															
Bettis Richardson		Eliminated															

== Controversies ==
The finale vote had been controversial due to the smallness of the margin. Ryan Seacrest also added fuel by mistakenly announcing the difference in vote count first as 13,000, then 1,335, but eventually revealed later to be around 130,000. There was much discussion in the communication industry about the phone system being overloaded, and that more than 150 million votes were dropped, making the voting results suspect. In an interview prior to the start of the fifth season, executive producer Nigel Lythgoe revealed that Clay Aiken had led the fan voting from the wild card week onward until the finale.

There was controversy when contestant Frenchie Davis was disqualified from the competition after it was revealed that she had once posed for topless photos on the Internet. Shortly afterwards, she landed a role in the Broadway musical Rent.

Corey Clark was also disqualified from the show because, according to the Idol producers, Clark had a police record he had not disclosed to the show. However, in 2005, Clark alleged in an interview on ABC's Primetime Live and in a book, They Told Me to Tell the Truth, So... The Sex, Lies and Paulatics of One of America's Idols, that he and judge Paula Abdul had had an affair while he was on the show and that this contributed to his removal. Clark also alleged that Abdul gave him preferential treatment on the show and tips on song choice. A subsequent investigation by an independent counsel hired by Fox "could not corroborate the evidence or allegations provided by Mr. Clark or any witnesses". Paula Abdul was therefore considered exonerated but an "enhanced non-fraternization policy" was put in place after the investigation.

During the Top 10, a problem with the telephone system resulted in some votes not being registered for Julia DeMato; however, Fox insisted that the mistake would not have made any difference in her being voted off.

During the course of the contest, Studdard became known for wearing 205 Flava jerseys representing his area code; when asked about them early in the season, Studdard told Seacrest that he was "just representing 205". Shortly after the end of the contest, Studdard sued 205 Flava, Inc. for $2 Million dollars for using his image for promotional purposes. 205 Flava responded by alleging that Studdard had accepted over $10,000 in return for wearing 205 shirts, and produced eight cashed checks to validate their claim. The allegations, if true, were a clear violation of the American Idol rules. The lawsuit was settled out of court.

== U.S. Nielsen ratings ==
The number of average viewers per episode this season was 21.7 million, an increase of 71% over the first season. Its Wednesday episodes finished as the third most-watched show of the year averaging 21.93 million, and the Tuesday episodes fifth at 21.56 million. The show ranked second in the coveted 18/49 demographic for the 2002–2003 season. This season's finale episode still ranks as the most-watched single episode in Idol history at 38.1 million, the finale night itself averaged 33.7 million when the pre-show special is taken into consideration. The show also helped Fox become the season's number three network in total viewers for the first time.

Episode list

Show	Episode	Air date	Week rank	18-49 rating	Viewers (in millions)
1	"New York, Miami & Austin Auditions"	January 21, 2003	4	12.4	26.5
2	"Special: American Idol revisited"	January 21, 2003	7	11.3	23.6
3	"Pasadena & Detroit Auditions"	January 22, 2003	5	11.8	24.9
4	"Atlanta & Nashville Auditions"	January 28, 2003	4	11.6	24.1
5	"Hollywood Week"	January 29, 2003	2	12.6	26.0
6	"Top 32: Group 1"	February 4, 2003	9	9.7	20.1
7	"Top 32: Group 1 results"	February 5, 2003	10	9.4	19.3
8	"Top 32: Group 2"	February 11, 2003	8	9.7	20.0
9	"Top 32: Group 2 results"	February 12, 2003	11	9.0	18.7
10	"Top 32: Group 3"	February 18, 2003	9	9.2	19.7
11	"Top 32: Group 3 results"	February 19, 2003	19	7.4	
12	"Special: Best of the Worst"	February 19, 2003	11	8.8	19.5
13	"Top 32: Group 4"	February 25, 2003	5	9.7	20.0
14	"Top 32: Group 4 results"	February 26, 2003	12	8.7	17.1
15	"Wildcard Show"	March 4, 2003	3	8.5	18.7
16	"Wildcard Results"	March 5, 2003	4	8.5	18.0
17	"Top 12 Perform"	March 11, 2003	2	10.3	22.0
18	"Top 12 Results"	March 12, 2003	9	8.7	18.3
19	"Top 11 Perform"	March 18, 2003	2	10.0	21.1
20	"Top 11 Results"	March 19, 2003	4	7.9	17.2
21	"Top 10 Perform"	March 25, 2003	1	9.4	19.8
22	"Top 10 Results"	March 26, 2003	2	8.7	19.0
23	"Top 9 Perform"	April 1, 2003	2	9.6	21.2
24	"Top 9 Results"	April 2, 2003	4	9.7	20.3
25	"Top 8 Perform"	April 8, 2003	2	9.7	20.1
26	"Top 8 Results"	April 9, 2003	3	9.4	19.2
27	"Top 7 Perform"	April 15, 2003	1	8.8	20.0
28	"Top 7 Results"	April 16, 2003	4	8.4	18.1
29	"Special: Halfway Home"	April 21, 2003	12	6.2	14.1
30	"Top 6 Perform"	April 22, 2003	4	9.6	20.6
31	"Top 6 Results"	April 23, 2003	6	9.3	19.5
32	"Top 5 Perform"	April 29, 2003	2	9.7	20.4
33	"Top 5 Results"	April 30, 2003	3	9.0	20.2
34	"Top 4 Perform"	May 6, 2003	4	10.1	22.2
35	"Top 4 Results"	May 7, 2003	2	10.4	22.7
36	"Top 3 Perform"	May 13, 2003	4	10.7	23.4
37	"Top 3 Results"	May 14, 2003	2	11.4	25.3
38	"Top 2 Special"	May 19, 2003	8	7.4	16.9
39	"Top 2 Showdown"	May 20, 2003	3	11.2	25.7
40	"Finale Pre-show Special"	May 21, 2003	2	13.1	30.4
41	"American Idol Season 2 Finale"	May 21, 2003	1	16.8	38.1

A couple of specials were aired later in the year - From Justin To Kelly: The Rise of Two American Idols on June 20, 2003, and American Idol: Christmas Songs on November 25, 2003, the latter of which was ranked number 30 with total viewer number of 10.9 million, and number 28 in the 18/49 demo with a 4.1 rating.

== Releases ==
=== Compilations ===
- American Idol Season 2: All-Time Classic American Love Songs (Album, 2003)
- American Idol: The Great Holiday Classics (Feat. Ruben Studdard, Clay Aiken, Kimberley Locke - Album, 2003)
- American Christmas (Feat. Trenyce, Frenchie Davis - Album, 2008)

== Tour ==
- American Idols Live! Tour 2003
