= Heartland (American band) =

American country music band

- Origin: Huntsville, Alabama, United States
- Genres: Country
- Years active: 1994–2012, 2023-present
- Labels: Lofton Creek, Country Thunder, Permian, R&J, Yellowhammer
- Members: Craig Anderson; Todd Anderson; Mike Myerson; Dustin Myerson - Lance Horton
- Past members: Jason Albert; Chuck Crawford; Keith West; Chad Austin

Heartland is an American country music band from Huntsville, Alabama. It originally consisted of Jason Albert (lead vocals), Craig Anderson (rhythm guitar), Todd Anderson (drums), Chuck Crawford (fiddle, background vocals), Mike Myerson (lead guitar), and Keith West (bass guitar, background vocals). Signed to Lofton Creek Records in 2006, the band topped the country charts that year with its debut single "I Loved Her First ", also the title track to its debut album. After their next five singles failed to chart within the Top 40, all members except Albert and Crawford left, with former solo artist Chad Austin joining. This lineup disbanded in 2012. In 2023, the band re-established with a lineup consisting of Craig and Todd Anderson, Mike Myerson, Dustin Myerson and lead vocalist Lance Horton.

== History ==
Heartland was founded in 1994 by brothers Craig and Todd Anderson, and Mike Myerson. They performed at a June Jam in the state of Alabama in 1997, and began seeking a record contract through the assistance of songwriter Walt Aldridge.

Heartland signed with an independent record label called Lofton Creek Records in 2006. The group's debut single, "I Loved Her First", was released later that year, and went on to top the Billboard Hot Country Songs charts. The band's debut album, also titled I Loved Her First, was released in October 2006. Ken Burke of Country Standard Time gave the album a positive review, praising the instrumentation and Albert's "hardcore southern vocals", also saying that it had "snappy execution and catchy hooks galore."

After its second and third singles performed poorly, the band exited Lofton Creek and signed with Country Thunder Records in March 2007. They began working with producer Mark Bright, but instead released "Once a Woman Gets a Hold of Your Heart", which was co-written by John Rich of Big & Rich and Richie McDonald of Lonestar, with Rich also serving as producer. It was followed by "Slow Down", which did not chart. The label closed in March 2009. In July of the same year, the band moved to Permian Records and released the single "Mustache". Also, Myerson left the group.

By 2012, all of the original members except Albert and Crawford had left the band to start families, while Chad Austin joined. Austin had recorded two albums for Asylum Records in the late 1990s, and was later signed to Broken Bow Records. Also, Albert had been experiencing vocal issues which had to be treated with exercises and rest. To reduce the strain on his vocal cords, all three members now alternate on lead vocals. The lineup of Albert, Crawford, and Austin released a new single, "The Sound a Dream Makes", in September 2012. It was produced by James Stroud and released via his R&J Records.

In July 2019, the band (now consisting of Jason Albert, Charles Crawford and Keith West) released its first album in over a decade titled I Loved Her First: The Heart of Heartland on Permian Records, featuring 10 new original songs with special guest appearances by Tracy Lawrence on the new version of their first hit "I Loved Her First" and Samantha Crawford on "When Love Comes Around".

In 2023, the Anderson brothers and Mike Myerson re-established Heartland with a new guitar player, Dustin Myerson and lead singer, Lance Horton. The band also announced a new album slated for release later in the year via Yellowhammer Records.

== Discography ==
=== Studio albums ===
Title	Album details	Peak chart positions		
Title	Album details	US Country	US	US Indie
I Loved Her First	Release date: October 10, 2006; Label: Lofton Creek Records	3	11	1
I Loved Her First: The Heart of Heartland	Release date: July 26, 2019; Label: Permian Records	-	-	-

=== Singles ===
Year	Single	Peak chart positions		Certifications	Album
Year	Single	US Country	US	Certifications	Album
2006	"I Loved Her First"	1	34	RIAA: Platinum	I Loved Her First
2007	"Built to Last"	58	—		I Loved Her First
2007	"Let's Get Dirty"	—	—		I Loved Her First
2007	"Once a Woman Gets a Hold of Your Heart"	52	—		—N/a
2008	"Slow Down"	—	—		—N/a
2009	"Mustache"	—	—		—N/a
2012	"The Sound a Dream Makes"	—	—		—N/a
2015	"I Loved Her First" (re-entry)	7	—		I Loved Her First
2019	"I Loved Her First" (re-recording with Tracy Lawrence)	—	—		I Loved Her First: The Heart of Heartland
2024	"No Tomorrow"	—	—		—N/a
"—" denotes releases that did not chart

=== Music videos ===
Year	Video	Director
2006	"I Loved Her First"	Todd Schaffer
2009	"Mustache"	Chris Conn

== Awards and nominations ==
Year	Organization	Award	Nominee/Work	Result
2007	Academy of Country Music Awards	Top New Vocal Group or Duo	Heartland	Nominated
2007	Academy of Country Music Awards	Single Record of the Year	"I Loved Her First"	Nominated
