= Lofton Creek Records =

American record label

- Founded: 1999
- Founder: Harold Shafer, Vicky Shafer, Mike Borchetta, Martha Borchetta
- Genre: Country
- Country of origin: U.S.
- Location: Nashville, Tennessee

Lofton Creek Records was an American independent country music record label. The label is notable for releasing "I Loved Her First", a number-one single for the band Heartland.

== History ==
Harold Shafer and his wife Vicky founded Lofton Creek Records in Nashville, Tennessee, in 1999. Three years later, Mike Borchetta (father of record executive Scott Borchetta) and his wife Martha joined as business partners. The label was based in Nashville, Tennessee. In 2003, they also distributed the Big Al label, which was founded by country singer J. Michael Harter. By 2004, the Borchettas owned a twenty percent stake in Lofton Creek, and the label had just signed Jeffrey Steele. The label had its first chart entry in 2004 with Keith Bryant's "Ridin' with the Legend", a tribute song to Dale Earnhardt. This song charted at number 47 on Billboard Hot Country Songs in late 2004.

The label achieved a number-one single on the same chart in 2006 with Heartland's "I Loved Her First," which also got nominated for the Academy of Country Music Award for Single Record of the Year. The label signed Gwen Sebastian in 2009. American Idol finalist Carmen Rasmusen also recorded for the label. Mark Chesnutt signed with Lofton Creek in 2007 and released his album Rollin' with the Flow that year. Gwen Sebastian signed with Lofton Creek in 2009 prior to her becoming a contestant on The Voice.

Harold Shafer died in 2011 after complications from a stroke. The label had no releases after this.

== Notable artists ==
- Keith Bryant
- Mark Chesnutt
- Drew Davis Band
- J. Michael Harter
- Heartland
- Shawn King
- Billy McKnight
- Allison Paige
- Kaylens Rain
- Carmen Rasmusen
- Shane Sellers
- Jeffrey Steele
- Doug Stone
