= Charles Grigsby =

American singer (born 1978)

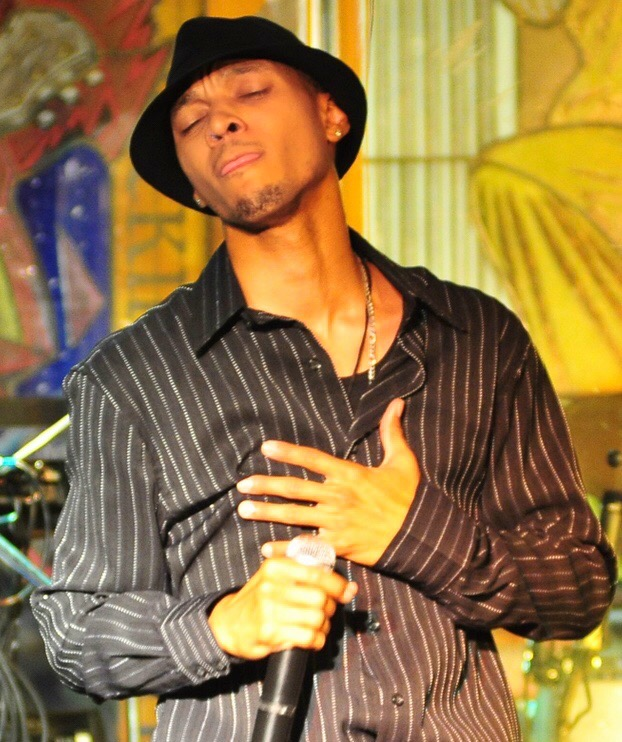
- Grigsby in 2010

Background information
- Born: Charles William Grigsby, Jr. September 15, 1978 (age 47); Oberlin, Ohio, U.S.
- Genres: Pop, R&B, soul
- Occupation: Singer
- Instrument: Vocals
- Years active: 2003–present
- Labels: Cityboyz Music Ltd; Charles Grigsby Music Ltd
- Website: www.charlesgrigsby.com

Charles William Grigsby, Jr. is an American singer-songwriter and a finalist on the second season of American Idol.

== Early life ==
The youngest of six siblings, Grigsby was born in Oberlin, Ohio. In high school, he joined the school choir. After high school, Grigsby moved to Detroit, Michigan, and enrolled in school to study computer-aided design.

== American Idol ==
Grigsby auditioned for the second season of American Idol where he sang "Overjoyed" by Stevie Wonder in the first semifinal group and was one of two contestants from the round to automatically advance to the final 12.

In the finals, he sang "How Sweet It Is (To Be Loved by You)" by Marvin Gaye and advanced to the top 11, where he was eliminated after singing "You Can't Win" from The Wiz.

He was a part of the American Idols LIVE! Tour 2003 which ran from July 8 to August 31, where he sang "Do I Do" by Stevie Wonder.

== Post-Idol ==
On July 21, 2005, Grigsby released, Charles Grigsby, an EP self-titled consisting of six tracks. In 2008, he joined a local band that performed across northeast Ohio. In September 2010, he then became the lead vocalist of the international band, Centric, in the Hard Rock Cafe in Pattaya, Thailand.

On September 1, 2011, Grigsby released a music download single. "Headliner." and performed the song on WJW Fox 8 Cleveland News. A benefit concert featuring Grigsby was held at The First Church in Oberlin on September 11, 2011.

After taking vocal rest, Grigsby returned to the music industry and released his album Hindsight on December 31, 2020 and a single Christmas Once Again on December 1, 2022.

== Discography ==
Album information
Charles Grigsby (EP)
- Released: July 21, 2005
- Track listing:
1. "Baby, I Love Your Way"
2. "5 W's"
3. "Those Loving Eyes"
4. "Tell Me"
5. "That Coulda Been Me"
6. "After Party"
Hindsight
- Released: December 31, 2020
- Track listing:
1. "The Provider"
2. "Forever (Still The Same)"
3. "You Are"
4. "Take Me Back"
5. "Everything"
6. "My Heart Belongs To You"
7. "A.S.K."
8. "Fallin'"
9. "All Things"
10. "Open Arms"

Single information
"Headliner"
- Released: September 1, 2011
"Christmas Once Again"
- Released: December 1, 2022
