= Corey Clark =

American singer

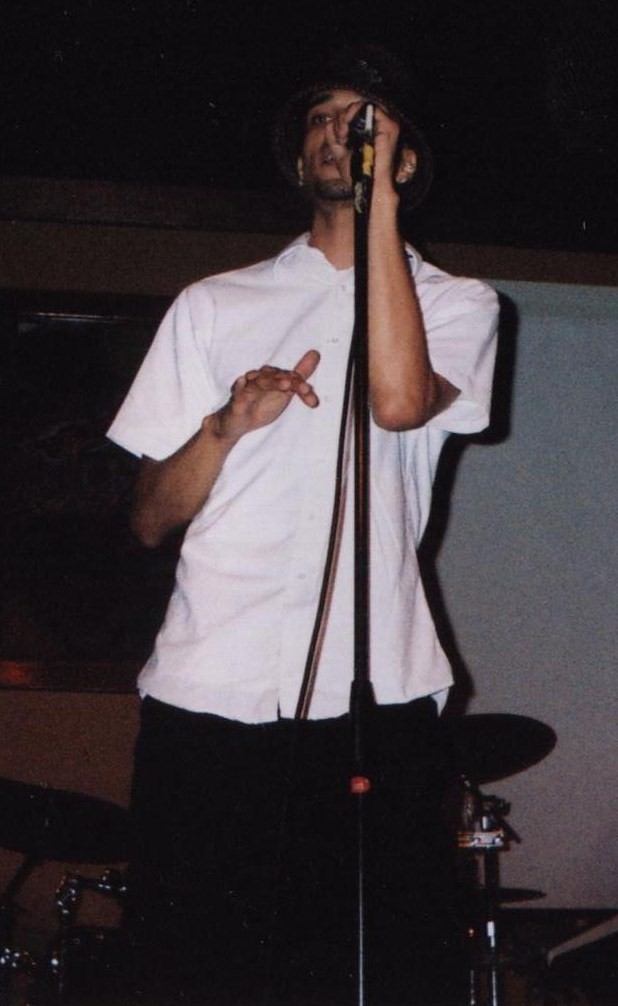
- Corey Clark opening a show for Ruben Studdard.

Background information
- Born: Corey Delaney Clark; July 13, 1980 (age 46); San Bernardino, California, US
- Origin: Lufkin, Texas
- Genres: Pop, R&B
- Occupation: Singer
- Instrument: Vocals
- Years active: 1991–present
- Label: Universal/Bungalo Records

Corey Delaney Clark (born July 13, 1980) is an American singer. He is known for his highly publicized disqualification from the second season of American Idol and later allegations of a sexual relationship with then-Idol judge Paula Abdul, although an internal investigation by an independent counsel appointed by the Fox network found no cause to believe there had been a sexual relationship between the two. Clark is the older brother of WNBA player Alysha Clark.

== Early life and career ==
Corey Clark was born July 13, 1980, in San Bernardino, California, to Duane and Jan Clark, two singers who met on the road in Nashville, Tennessee in early 1978 while following their own musical aspirations. Duane, an R&B and disco singer who sang in San Bernardino nightclubs and opened for Al Wilson and B. B. King and recorded and performed with the James Last Orchestra and the Hamburg Symphony Orchestra, is of African American, Cherokee, Apache, and Blackfoot descent. Jan Clark, the Hungarian-Ukrainian, Jewish, Irish, French, Cherokee, and Algonquian great granddaughter of a Budapest concert pianist, met Duane in Nashville while she worked in nightclubs specializing in R&B and Barbra Streisand. The multiracial nature of the Clarks’ relationship and of Corey's heritage was a source of racial conflict for the family during the Clarks' early years in Lufkin, Texas, where Corey recalls a story his parents told him about; a December 1979 incident in which the couple were driving to church for a Christmas event, with Duane dressed as Santa Claus, when they were pulled over by a white police officer, who smashed one of the car's tail lights, and told Duane he was being pulled over and arrested for driving with a broken tail light.

Less subtle was the racism at school, where Clark says he and his sister got into fights with schoolmates in the first grade who called them "niggers" and "cottonheads". Adding to his sense of identity confusion was the fact that African Americans did not accept him either, and called him and his sister "wiggers", on which Clark comments, "It's real unsettling when you’re young and don't know which group you belong to." Today, Clark reflects on his multiethnic heritage with pride, and says he wishes more people were open-minded about interracial dating, saying, "Our family could claim to be the ultimate melting pot," and that being of so many different ethnicities gave him the ability to "adapt to any situation".

Clark's interest in music was stimulated at an early age; his first clear memory was of his parents, his aunt Audrey, and his father's band recording a demo tape in a Denver studio. Having attended concerts by Boyz II Men, TLC and Montell Jordan, he himself began singing at age 11, without any formal training, at school functions and concerts.

Clark received his first professional singing job when he was 13, when Debbie Byrd, a family friend and vocal coach who would later go on to work on American Idol, recruited him and his parents to be among the backup singers for Barry Manilow during a week-long appearance in Las Vegas. Although Manilow was not a favorite of Clark's, he realized his dream during this engagement, saying,

When the curtain went up the first night, I was floored by the response from the sell-out crowd. I’d never been on stage as a professional singer before, and I got to see someone at the peak of his career working the stage and the audience. Every night he made his performance feel fresh, not just going through the motions. Experiencing the energy of a live show wasn't at all like listening to a tape or a CD, I realized. It was magical. I was hooked!

At age 14, Clark started and performed as the lead vocalist in an R&B vocal group called Envy. The group also included the now-Grammy Award-winning singer Ne-Yo, Solomon Ridge and Ray Blaylock. Envy performed in several talent contests, and a few years later, won the grand prize at a Las Vegas amateur singing contest. Envy also opened major shows for major artists such as Mýa and Destiny's Child, and performed during Amateur Night at the Apollo Theater in Harlem, New York. The group signed a recording deal in 2000, but nothing came of it, and it disbanded after eight years of performances.

Clark and his family moved to Nashville, and while working as a stage hand in 2002, Clark auditioned for the reality television music competition show American Idol; he has been described as "one of the most impressive top ten finalists of the talent search's second season". Clark names making it to the top 32 finalists during that season to be his proudest moment.

== American Idol ==
=== Performances ===
| Week | Theme | Song Sung | Artist | Order Performed | Status |
|---|---|---|---|---|---|
| Semifinals | Group #4 | "Foolish Heart" | Steve Perry | 8 | Advanced |
| Top 12 | Motown | "This Old Heart of Mine (Is Weak for You)" | The Isley Brothers | 9 | Safe |
| Top 11 | Songs of the Cinema | "Against All Odds (Take a Look at Me Now)" from "Against All Odds" | Phil Collins | 1 | Bottom 2 |
| Top 10 | Country Rock | "Drift Away" | Dobie Gray | 4 | Safe; Later disqualified |

=== Controversies ===
==== Disqualification ====
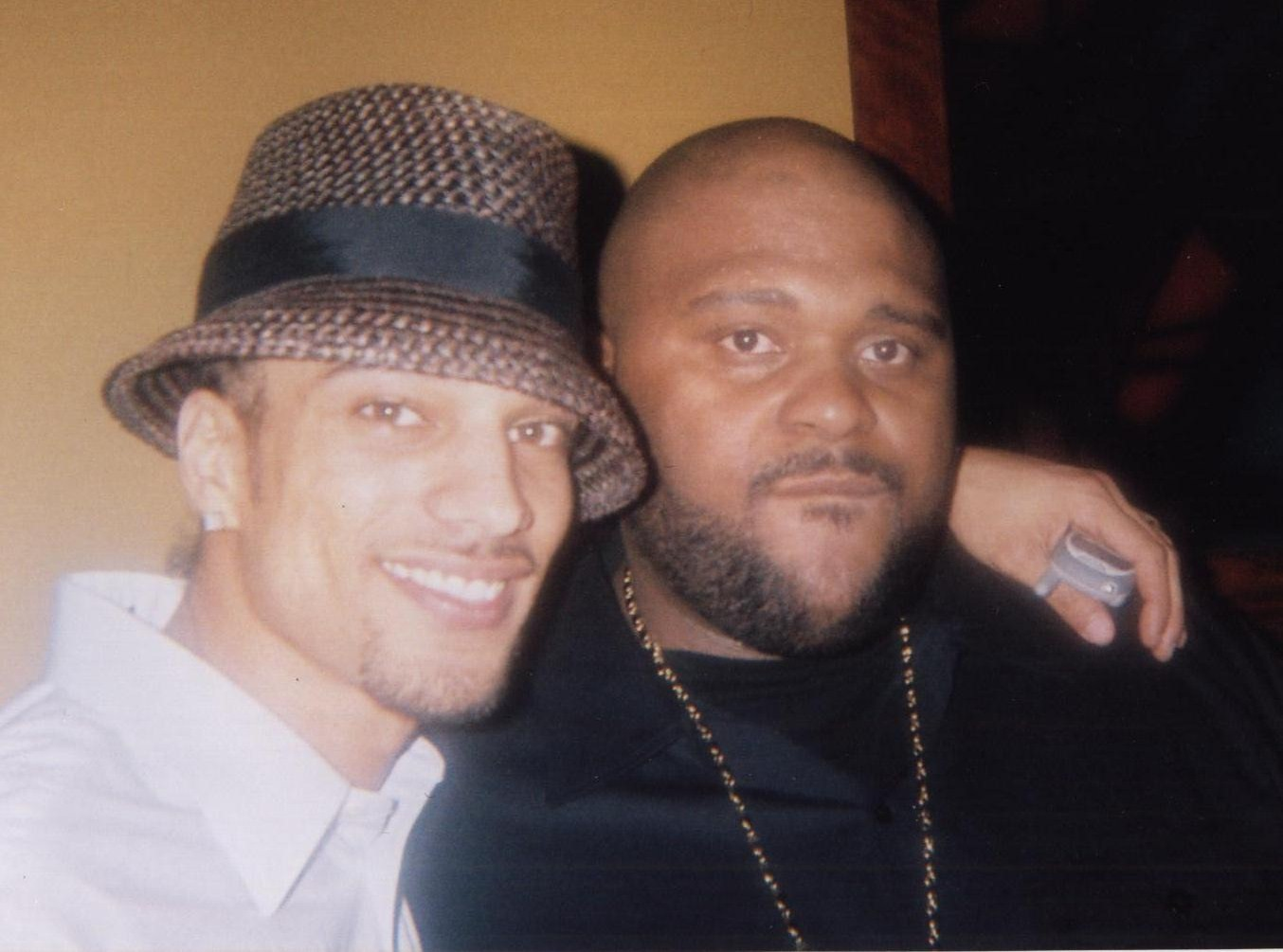
Clark with Ruben Studdard in 2007.

During the American Idol competition, The Smoking Gun revealed that Clark had been arrested at his Topeka, Kansas home on October 12, 2002, after neighbors called police after hearing a commotion within the residence, including a girl yelling. Police arrived and questioned Clark and his 15-year-old sister Alysha, after which Clark became confrontational with the officers. Clark alleges police misconduct in handling the matter, asserting that he was beaten by the officers, who ultimately wrestled Clark to the pavement and handcuffed him behind his back. After managing to get his handcuffed hands in front of him in the squad car, he was shown a taser and warned he would be shot with it if he continued to resist, at which point he relented. He was charged with misdemeanor battery on four police officers and his sister, and endangering the welfare of a child. However both Clark and his sister Alysha have denied that he ever hit her, and Alysha echoed her brother's account of the way the situation transpired.

On December 4, days after Clark became one of the final 32 American Idol contestants, he was charged in Kansas District Court with resisting arrest, battery upon his sister, and criminal restraint. Clark ultimately pleaded "no contest" to "obstructing legal process" through a plea agreement, and was sentenced to six months unsupervised probation and ordered to pay $116.00 USD in legal costs. Clark states in his book, "Initially no charges were filed against me, and I was refunded my $116.00 USD bond money after attending a November 11, 2002 court hearing back in Topeka." That December, after Clark had filled out his contracts for American Idol and was publicly named a semi-finalist on the show, the state district attorney elected to proceed with the case and filed charges against him.

According to American Idol's producers, Clark did not disclose his arrest record when joining the competition, although Clark maintains in his book American Paulatics that he spoke with them and with judge Paula Abdul about his legal troubles. Producers also explained that the background checks conducted on all contestants did not uncover his arrest because of a misspelling of Clark's name in the police report. Clark maintains that this could not be true, as all background checks are conducted via social security numbers, which Clark had provided to producers in his contract. The producers disqualified Clark from further participation in the competition nine hours after the story broke.

Clark believes that he was punished for causing conflict with producers behind the scenes. According to Clark, after he made it to the twelve finalists' round, he and the other finalists were unduly pressured by producers to sign a contract, using one of two attorneys handpicked by the producers for representation, or be disqualified from the show. Clark and his fellow contestants' position was that having the producers select an attorney for them was a conflict of interest, a conclusion they reached with the advice of Abdul, who had told Clark, "Look, if you can get six of your fellow contestants to stand up with you and say, 'We want our own attorney, we're not rolling with this stuff you want us to do,' they will not kick off the rest of the cast." The other contestants decided to support him in standing up to producers, and consulted with Abdul's lawyer, Howard Siegel, on her recommendation (though Clark maintains in his book that they did not know at the time that Siegel was one of Abdul's attorneys). Two weeks later, producers began asking Clark about his arrest record, and dismissed him from the show.

==== Relationship with Paula Abdul ====
Two years later, Clark began making allegations about his relationship with Abdul. Clark stated in his E-book, They Told Me to Tell the Truth, So...: The Sex, Lies and Paulatics of One of America's Idols, and in a May 2005 interview with Primetime Live that Idol judge Paula Abdul took him under her wing, beginning on December 12, 2002, and coached him on how to succeed in the competition, including helping him select the right songs, clothes, and hairstyle, in order to avoid the show's "exploitation" of young hopefuls' careers like himself, and that this mentorship developed into a three-month-long sexual relationship.

Clark provided, as evidence of his relationship with Paula Abdul, a message that Abdul left on his voice mail, multiple eyewitness accounts of Clark and Abdul being intimate together in public places, accounts by Clark's parents of Abdul calling their home looking for Clark, a bottle of prescription strength cough medicine prescribed to Abdul in Clark's possession, and phone records of Abdul and Clark speaking to each other for several hours at a time during late night hours. Abdul dismissed Clark's claims as lies, saying that she would not "dignify Clark's claims with a response", explaining, "Not only do I never lie, I never respond to lies". The show's other judges and some of the show's former contestants also expressed disbelief of Clark's claims, which Clark saw as an attempt by Abdul, the show, and the network to cover up the matter.

Idol producer Nigel Lythgoe, who was unimpressed with the evidence presented, called it "shoddy journalism". Regarding Clark's possession of Abdul's phone number, Lythgoe said, "And I know for a fact that a lot of the contestants have got Paula's phone number and contact her and she contacts them. Paula's the den mother. ... I don't have a problem with that. She's been a star and now she can help them and that's more than Simon [Cowell]." Lythgoe also addressed Clark's claim that he sent Abdul a secret message by singing "I owe it all to you" on the show by explaining that the serenade was choreographed by the producers. Lythgoe also questioned why it took two years for Clark to reveal his alleged affair with Abdul, fueling speculation that Clark was merely attempting to gain publicity for his upcoming album.

Clark denies that the timing of his revelation was part of a marketing ploy, asserting, "If I wanted publicity, I could have done it two years ago when they were first trying to defame my name." Clark states that Abdul and the producers engaged in a character assassination campaign that he could not afford to combat or ignore, and accused them of spreading falsehoods about him throughout the industry in order to ruin his career. Other former contestants who came to publicly back Clark's claims included second season semi-finalist Nasheka Siddall, who, it was stated on Primetime Live, first heard "whispers" about the affair soon after her time on the show as a contestant, and fellow second season finalist Trenyce, who corroborated Clark's claims on Showbiz Tonight. Clark also points to the fact in his e-book that his Idol roommates, Ricky Smith and Ruben Studdard, were never asked for their views on the validity of his claims, but that third season winner Fantasia Barrino was questioned as to her opinion about Clark's allegations, which Clark saw as an attempt by Fox or its investigators to use Barrino's following to bias the public against Clark. As Clark states:

All I have to say about it is that I have neither personally met Fantasia Barrino, nor have I ever competed against her on the same season of Idol, so there is no way that she could have accurately given a description to anybody, publicly or personally, about my or Paula's actions during my time as a contestant on American Idol.

In August 2005, after an internal investigation by an independent counsel appointed by Fox, which included interviews with Abdul, Clark and other witnesses, the investigators concluded that Clark's claims of a sexual relationship "have not been substantiated by any corroborating evidence or witnesses, including those provided by Mr. Clark, and Ms. Abdul expressly denies that any such relationship ever existed." The investigators further added that "Ms. Abdul acknowledges that she had telephone conversations with Mr. Clark while he was a contestant. Their accounts of those conversations, however, differ greatly and no evidence was uncovered to resolve the conflicts in their accounts." The network announced that Abdul could continue her judging duties on future seasons of American Idol, adding, "The line is whether it affects the outcome of the competition....It is the sanctity of the competition that is first and foremost."

In the fourth season finale of American Idol, there was a parody of Clark's claims, in which judge Simon Cowell was alleged to be having an affair with himself. The parody was very close in plot to the Primetime Live story. Clark released a statement that the parody offended him, and was an "insult to the intelligence of the viewer".

== Legal issues ==
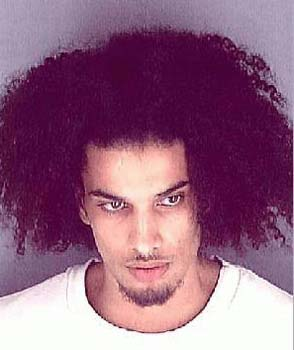
Clark's 2007 mug shot after being arrested on obstruction of justice charges

Clark was sued by Wal-Mart in April 2000 for passing more than $600 in bad checks. In May 2001, he was sued by a Topeka, Kansas grocery store where he allegedly passed a bad $50 check.

In June 2005, Clark was cited and released on a misdemeanor battery charge after getting into a food fight during breakfast in a hotel room with his record company manager, Laura Kathleen Troy, and their entourage, which escalated into food and dishes being thrown. According to Sacramento Police Sergeant Justin Risley, both parties suffered scratches on their arms, but Troy did not press charges, and both Clark and Troy left in a vehicle together. Clark later apologized for the incident, explaining that his dancers, management team and record label representatives were also involved in the food fight, but that after they had left to get cleaned up, he and his manager, who stayed to clean up the room, were the ones present when the police arrived.

In June 2006, Monica Rodriguez Gonzalez, Clark's wife and mother of their child, Yeshua, filed for a domestic violence protective order.

In July 2006, Clark was arrested on suspicion of violating a court order and trespassing at his wife's stepfather's residence in Yuma, Arizona. Charges were not filed at his subsequent arraignment, due to a delay in getting reports from the sheriff's office about the incident. On October 2, 2007, Clark pled guilty under a plea agreement to charges of felony aggravated harassment involving domestic violence for the trespassing offense, and was also placed on probation.

Clark filed a libel lawsuit on July 5, 2012, against MTV Networks for more than $40 million, saying that MTV News correspondent Jim Cantiello "falsely attacked Clark as a liar and called for a boycott of his music".

== Album and music career ==
Clark, along with the other second season finalists, recorded RCA Records' The American Idol Season 2: All-time Classic Love Songs soundtrack. Their version of the song "What the World Needs Now is Love" debuted at number six on the Hot 100 singles sales Billboard Magazine Chart, beating out Jackie DeShannon's 1965 debut of the same song in at number seven. With singles charting at number one ("God Bless the U.S.A.") and number six ("What the World Needs Now is Love") that year, Clark and the rest of the second-season cast became the first act since Nelly to place two titles in the top ten of Billboard Hot 100 Singles sales. In the May 17, 2003 issue of Billboard Magazine the soundtrack attained Billboard's Top Soundtrack number-one spot, Billboard's Top internet Album sales at number fourteen, Billboard 200 hot shot debut at number two, and the single "God Bless the U.S.A." remained at number one for three weeks. The soundtrack sold more than 500,000 copies domestically, giving Clark and his fellow second-season castmates Gold record status, as well as making them all number one artists on the Billboard Music Charts of May, 2003.

Clark's first album, Corey Clark, was released on June 21, 2005. Although the making of the album was highly publicized, the final product received minimal promotion or radio play. Despite featured guest spots from The Black Eyed Peas and Scott Storch, consumers were generally unaware that the album was released and available to the market. Clark claimed that radio conglomerate Clear Channel refused to play his record due to threats Clear Channel received that all American Idol promotional and advertising dollars would be pulled from any station playing Clark's record.

Clark signed a one album, press and distribution label imprint deal with Universal/Bungalo Records, making him the first American Idol contestant in history to release his own album under his own record company distributed by a major label. This helped him earn a larger share of the album royalties and profits, and made him a partner in the decision-making process into the creative development of the album.

== Other media appearances ==
Clark made a guest appearance on the first episode of the sixth season of The Surreal Life, as one of five possible new castmates to be chosen from in a "15 More Minutes of Fame Reality Hunk Pageant". He was the second contestant to be eliminated from the competition. WWE Tough Enough first season winner Maven Huffman was chosen as the new castmate. Commenting on his participation in that show, "I’m here to let the world see and get to know who Corey Clark really is, as I've been heavily portrayed by the media to be a bad guy."

Clark also performed on and co-hosted the 2005 New Music Weekly Awards, on which he debuted a selection from his album Out of Control.

In 2005 Clark was a guest on The Howard Stern Show. In 2006, he appeared on Only in LA, and on Soul Train.

Clark also appeared on the cover of the March 31, 2003 issue of People; on the May 25, 2005 issue of Steppin' Out magazine; and the August 26, 2005 issue of New Music Weekly magazine.

Clark appeared and was interviewed for the "Nashville Auditions" episode of American Idol Rewind, a syndicated repackaging of American Idol.

== Discography ==
- 2005: Corey Clark

Tracks:

1. "Chance to Dance" (Blaylock, Clark - 3:40)
2. "Cherry on Top" (Blaylock, Clark, Cooks, Keane - 4:33)
3. "Out of Control" (Clark - 3:36)
4. "So Many Questions" (Blaylock, Clark, Pierce, Ridgel - 4:07)
5. "Paulatics" (Clark, Cooks, Keane - 4:50)
6. "Follow That Back" (Blaylock, Clark, Cooks, Keane, Reid - 4:16)
7. "Feenin" (Blaylock, Clark, Cooks, Keane - 4:21)
8. "Lights Out" (Clark, Cleveland - 4:50)
9. "All This Love" (Debarge - 3:40)
10. "Yes I Can" (Abernathy, Clark - 3:19)
11. "Look What You've Done" (Abernathy, Blaylock, Clark - 4:22)
12. "That's My Girl" (Bonner, Clark, Cooks, Keane, Stokes - 4:23)
13. "Truthfully" (Blaylock, Clark - 3:12)
14. "Wiggle & Shake" (Blaylock, Clark, Cooks, Keane - 3:36)
15. "Bed of Roses" (Bonner, Clark - 3:49)
