= Trenyce =

American singer (born 1980)

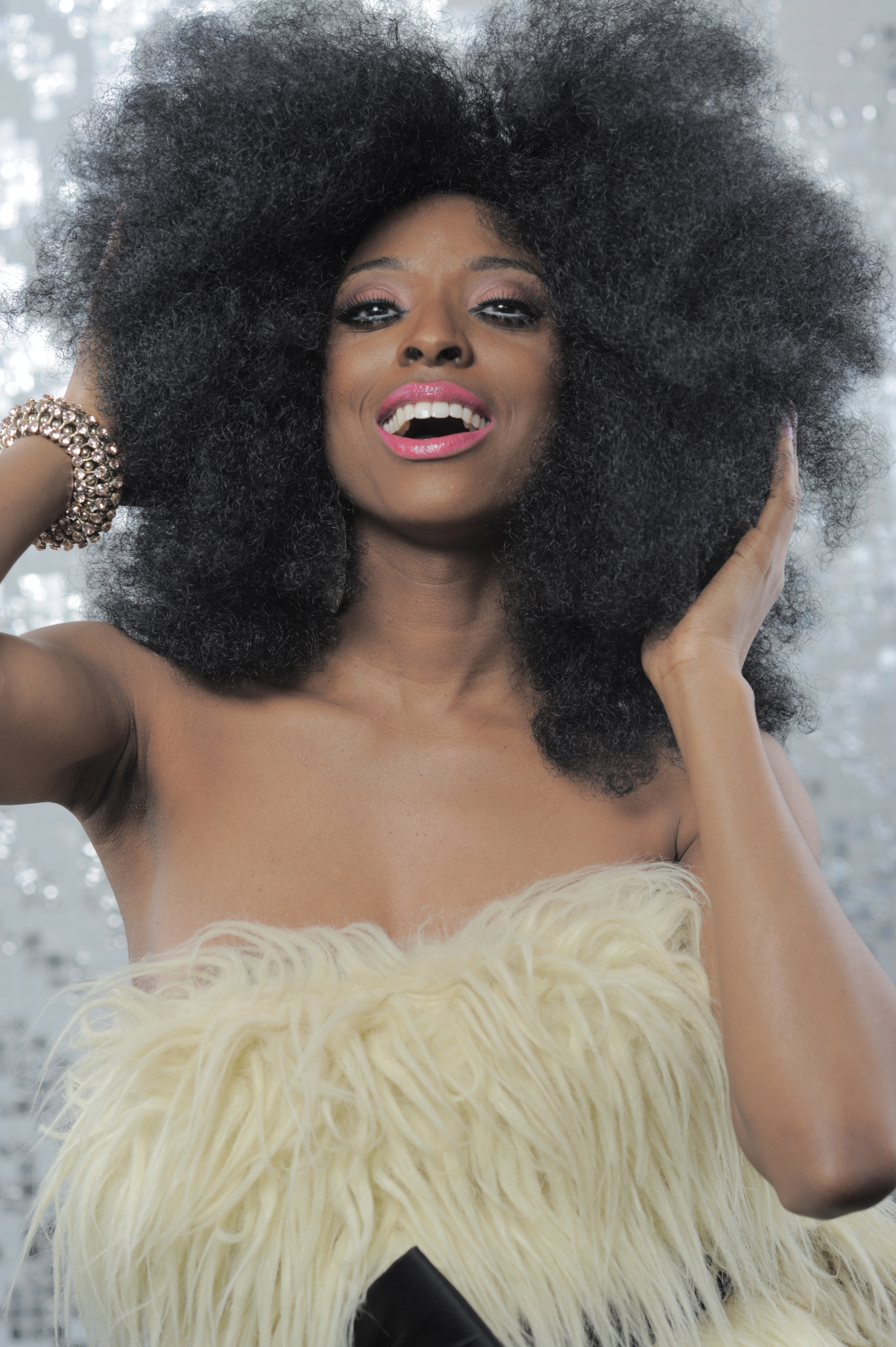
- Trenyce in a 2012 London photoshoot

Background information
- Born: Lashundra Trenyce Cobbins; March 31, 1980 (age 46); Memphis, Tennessee, U.S.
- Occupations: Singer, actress
- Instrument: Vocals
- Years active: 2002–present

Lashundra Trenyce Cobbins (/trəˈniːs/; born March 31, 1980) is an American singer and actress best known as a finalist on the second season of American Idol and for her work in musical theatre. Raised in Memphis, Tennessee, Trenyce won one of the categories of the NAACP ACT-SO as a teenager, and attended the University of Memphis on a music scholarship.

In 2004, Trenyce began to focus on theatre, playing roles in the plays Not a Day Goes By, The Vagina Monologues, Soul Kittens Cabaret and Mama's Sweet Potato Pie. In 2006, she played the lead role of Deena Jones in an Indianapolis production of the musical Dreamgirls. She made her film debut in 2008 and became the first American Idol contestant to headline a show in Las Vegas. She originated the role of Portia in David E. Talbert's play Love in the Nick of Tyme. Trenyce performed in a 2009 North American tour of the musical Ain't Misbehavin'.

From 2010 to 2013, she was the leading female vocalist in the revue Thriller – Live during a European tour and its West End run. She appeared in the 2013 comedy film Kick-Ass 2. In 2015, Trenyce hosted the Franco Dragone-produced cabaret show Taboo at the casino City of Dreams in Macau, China. She then returned to London for an extended reprise of her role in Thriller – Live. In 2017, she starred in the cabaret production Heart & Soul: Music of Whitney Houston, Dionne Warwick & Diana Ross, in California. In the same year, she played Diana Ross in a North American tour of Motown: The Musical.

== Early life and education ==
Lashundra Trenyce Cobbins was born in Memphis, Tennessee on March 31, 1980. Her father, Jesse Cobbins, worked for St. Joe Company, and her mother, Linda Ruth Cobbins, worked at FedEx. She has an older and a younger sister. As a child, she decided to be known by her middle name, feeling that it better suited her ambitions as a performer. Trenyce has written that her interest in music started after performing a solo in a musical production celebrating Martin Luther King Jr. She grew up in North Memphis, where she attended Central High School and performed in various talent shows and pageants. In 1996, she won first place in a singing competition at the national NAACP Afro-Academic, Cultural, Technological and Scientific Olympics in Atlanta.

At the age of nineteen, Trenyce was arrested for theft at work. A Shelby County, Tennessee, court permitted her to participate in a pre-trial diversion program that expunged the felony charges from her record. She has denied the theft and claimed that it was a co-worker who stole the items from her workplace. Trenyce attended the University of Memphis on a full music scholarship. While in college, she joined the University Singers ensemble choir and its band Sound Fuzion, which toured throughout Tennessee. After completing three years of the school's nursing program, Trenyce left the University of Memphis to pursue music full-time, performing in such venues as Rhythms Night Club, Precious Cargo and Isaac Hayes' Restaurant.

== Career ==
=== 2002–03: American Idol ===
In October 2002, Trenyce auditioned for the second season of the reality television series American Idol. She became one of the 32 semi-finalists. She was eliminated in the top 30 round, but judge Paula Abdul chose her as a "wildcard selection" to become one of the twelve finalists. Trenyce's arrest was disclosed to the public during an appearance on the show, but she was not removed from the series, as had happened with some former contestants. Producer Nigel Lythgoe clarified that Trenyce informed the producers of her criminal history from the outset. Trenyce placed fifth during the season finals. Jim Cantiello of MTV News connected the disclosure of Trenyce's mug shot and felony theft charges to her elimination from the show by public voting. Entertainment Weekly also concluded that the news relating to her criminal record reduced her appeal with voters. Several media commentators suggested that racism may have played a role in Trenyce's elimination, as she was one of only two dark-skinned finalists during the season (the other was winner Ruben Studdard).

Entertainment Weekly found her to be one of the show's most underrated contestants and called her a "polished performer with enough sass to eschew her surname". Tim Cuprisin of Milwaukee Journal Sentinel criticized Trenyce's use of her mononymous stage name as "a bit too slick even for a slick competition". Jan Jagodzinski argued in a 2005 book, however, that the name was an attempt to garner "an American appeal", since her birth name Lashundra Cobbin is "an impossible 'pop' signifier". Judge Simon Cowell said that he "never really warmed" to Trenyce, as she "worked very hard at her image – too hard".

American Idol Season 2 performances and results:
Week #	Theme	Song choice	Original artist	Notes	Results
Audition	N/A	"I Learned from the Best"	Whitney Houston		Advanced
Top 30	Semifinal/Group 1	"Love Sneakin' Up On You"	Bonnie Raitt		Wild Card
Top 30	Wildcard	"Let's Stay Together"	Al Green		Paula Abdul's choice
Top 12	Motown	"Come See About Me"	The Supremes		Safe
Top 11	Cinema	"I Have Nothing"	Whitney Houston		Safe
Top 10	Country rock	"I Need You"	LeAnn Rimes		Safe
Top 8	Disco	"I'm Every Woman"	Chaka Khan	No elimination	Bottom 2
Top 8	Billboard #1	"The Power of Love"	Celine Dion		Safe
Top 7	Billy Joel	"Baby Grand"	Billy Joel		Bottom 3
Top 6	Dianne Warren	"Have You Ever?"	Brandy		Bottom 3
Top 5	1960s Neil Sedaka	"Proud Mary" "Love Will Keep Us Together"	Creedence Clearwater Revival; Captain & Tennille		Eliminated

In 2016, Billboard magazine included Trenyce's rendition of "I Have Nothing" in its list of the 100 best American Idol live performances. Vulture.com's Maura Johnston criticized Trenyce for being "[a] little yell-y, a little pitch-y, a little guarded", but praised her voice and song choices and felt that she set "a precedent for the divas who followed" in later American Idol seasons. Trenyce's performance of "Let's Stay Together" was included on the compilation album American Idol Season 2: All-Time Classic American Love Songs (2003). AllMusic's Heather Phares thought Trenyce was one of the strongest performers of the show, but criticized her cover version for having an "indistinct quality". In an interview, Trenyce said that she was offered a record deal, following her appearance on American Idol, but she and her mother (who was her manager) rejected it because she found the terms unsatisfactory.

Following her elimination, Trenyce made appearances on television shows, including Live with Regis and Kelly, Extra, ET, Fox and Friends, The Early Show, The Wayne Brady Show, Inside Edition, Good Day Live, the Today Show and TRL. She also was featured in various Memphis periodicals, including as one of Memphis' 30 Most Beautiful People in Elite Magazine's June 2003 issue, and appeared on a cover of "God Bless the USA" along with the other American Idol Season 2 finalists. Trenyce participated in a three-month concert tour with the other season 2 finalists, performing "Proud Mary" and "I Have Nothing". Robin Givhan of The Washington Post was critical of Trenyce's performance on the tour, saying that she demonstrated the "earsplitting finesse of a sledgehammer". Arion Berger of the same publication described her as "a female drag queen with a diva's intimidating presence".

=== 2004–09: Transition to musical theatre ===
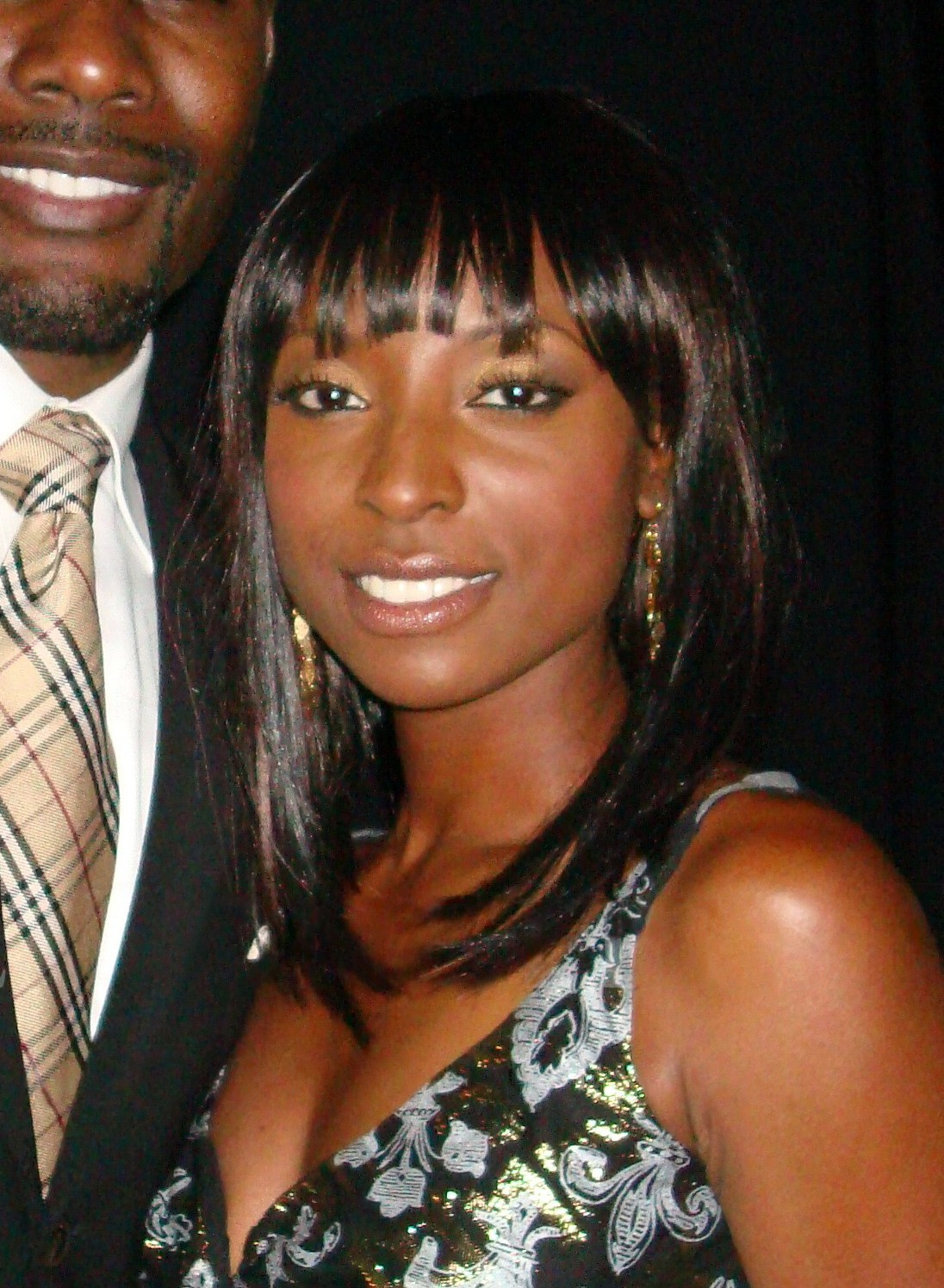
Trenyce at the 2008 NAACP Theatre Awards

Trenyce's work in theatre has mostly focused on "various entertainment aspects of African-American interest". In 2004, she made her theatre debut as Yancey in a North American tour of Not a Day Goes By, a play with songs adapted from the E. Lynn Harris' 2000 novel of the same name. The tour ran from January to May 2004. Jet magazine wrote that Trenyce "breathes life and voice into Yancey", describing her as one of the show's "rich vocal talents". The Chicago Defender felt that Trenyce displayed a "theatrical perception as she interprets a character". She soon performed in the play The Vagina Monologues. In 2005, she played in two Nicci Gilbert stage productions: Soul Kittens Cabaret and Mama's Sweet Potato Pie, participating in a North American tour of the latter. Trenyce's performance as the wife in Mama's Sweet Potato Pie was praised by Call and Post's Chris Bournea. The same year, she made a cameo appearance in the comedy film Beauty Shop, and performed on the BET reality television series College Hill.

Trenyce played the leading role of Deena Jones in an Indianapolis production of the musical Dreamgirls, which ran from June to July 2006. Her performance received positive reviews, including one from the newspaper NUVO, commenting that Trenyce's "smooth voice creat[ed] a sound for The Dreams that could easily have taken the group to the top of the charts". David Lindquist of The Indianapolis Star thought that Trenyce brought "star power" to the production. In the same year, she became the first American Idol contestant to headline a show in Las Vegas, Nevada, with V: The Ultimate Variety Show and Late Night Idol at the Sahara Hotel and Casino. She hosted it for nine months.

In 2007, Trenyce played Portia in David E. Talbert's play Love in the Nick of Tyme. It toured in North America to seventeen cities, starting in the Beacon Theatre in New York in January. In 2010, a film of the play was released on DVD, and its soundtrack was released separately. The film was also broadcast on Black Entertainment Television (BET). Trenyce performed at the Razz Room in San Francisco from July 22 to August 2, 2008. The same year, she made her film debut as Unique in the LGBT independent romantic comedy movie Friends & Lovers: The Ski Trip 2. A year later, she contributed the title track to the soundtrack for the film Truth Hall. Trenyce played a role in the 30th anniversary revival tour of the musical Ain't Misbehavin' after a recommendation from Ruben Studdard. As traditionally done with the show, the performers used their own names for their characters. The cast album received a nomination for the Grammy Award for Best Musical Theater Album at the 52nd Annual Grammy Awards.

=== 2010–14: Thriller – Live and work in London ===
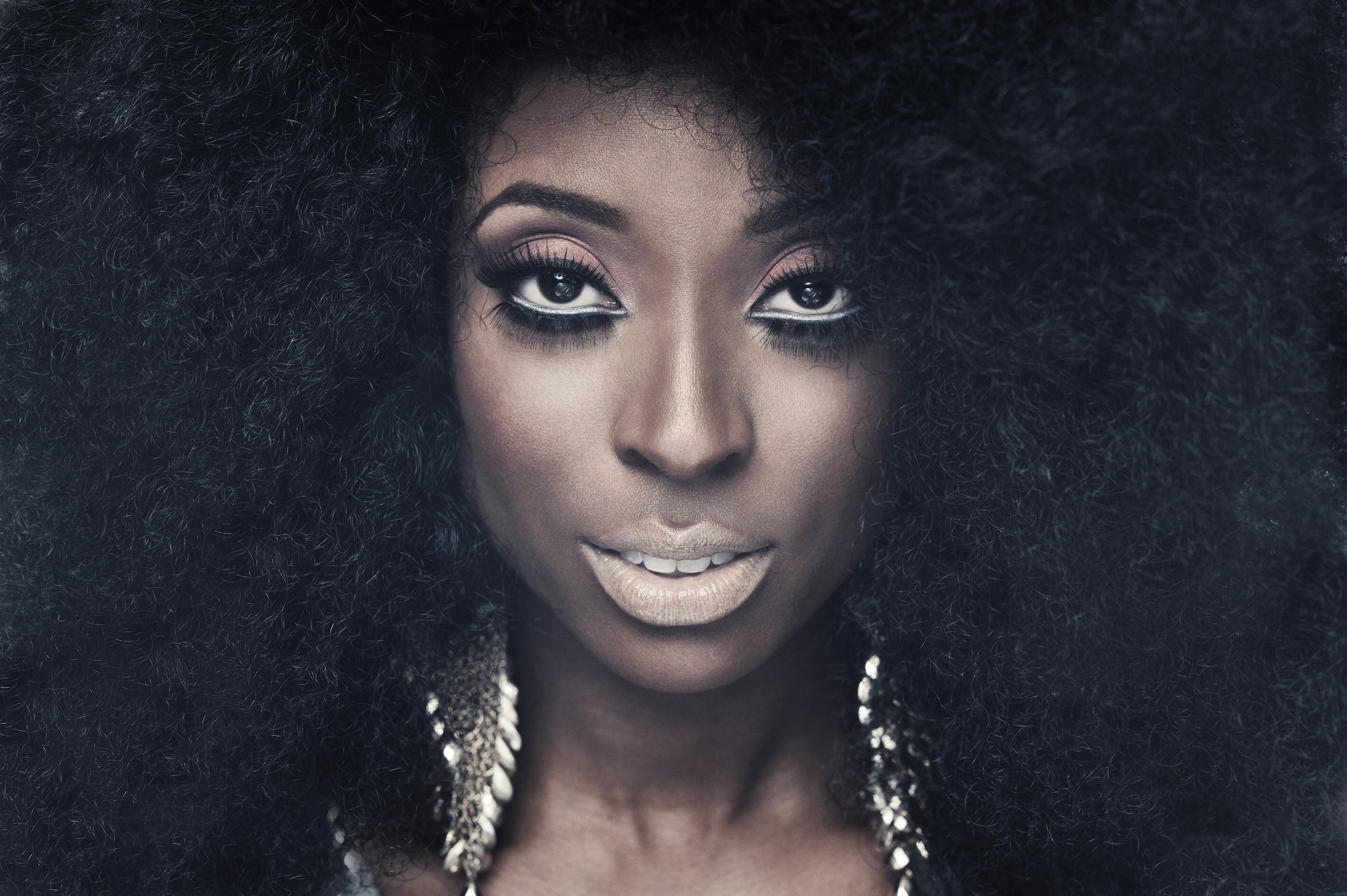
Trenyce in a 2012 photoshoot in London

In 2010, Trenyce sang during the interludes and dance performances for Louis Van Amstel"s Ballroom with a Twist. Karyn Saemann of Madison.com described Trenyce as "a truly gifted singer who did more than justice to several tunes", especially in her performances of Whitney Houston songs.

Later in 2010, Trenyce joined the Michael Jackson tribute concert revue Thriller – Live as the leading female vocalist during a European tour. She reprised her role when the show played at the Lyric Theatre in London's West End. She starred in the concert for three years, from 2010 until 2013, performing material from different periods in Jackson's career. In an interview with The Hollywood Reporter, Trenyce said that the audience was initially hesitant to hear a woman interpret Jackson's music. Theatreworld's Geoff Billingsley praised Trenyce's performance, writing that her voice sounded very similar to Jackson's and describing her as an improvement over the previous female lead Cleo Higgins.

While in London, Trenyce also hosted the variety show The Box. In 2012, she provided the vocals for Baff Akoto's short film Afterglow about a group of friends who navigate jazz culture in London. She had a minor role in the 2013 superhero, comedy film Kick-Ass 2 as Hit-Girl's cheerleading coach. In December 2013, she released three songs: "Fever", "In the End (Alright)" and "Where Do They Go?" on iTunes. The following year, she worked with producer DJ Guy Scheiman on his single "Brazil You're Ready (Synethetic)", with remixes released in 2015.

=== 2015–present: Macau and other work ===
In 2015, Trenyce hosted Taboo, a cabaret show designed by Franco Dragone, in Macau, China. The show was staged in the casino City of Dreams; Trenyce was given creative control over the selection of musical genres and songs as long as they fit the cabaret's overall style. Macau.com praised Trenyce's stage presence and "the power of her voice and stature". In 2016, Trenyce collaborated with DJ Guy Scheiman on his single "This Time". From 2015 to 2017, Trenyce reprised her role in the West End production of Thriller – Live. Reviewer Hannah Kerin praised Trenyce's performance of Jackson's 1987 single "The Way You Make Me Feel", calling it "show-stopping" and writing that it "stood out amidst many fantastic renditions of the hits and less well known material".

In 2017, Trenyce starred in Heart & Soul: Music of Whitney Houston, Dionne Warwick & Diana Ross, promoted as part of "the Chris Isaacson Presents lineup of spring cabaret fare". as one of "three sultry starlets". She participated in the show during its stints at the Catalina Bar & Grill in Hollywood and Martinis Above Fourth in San Diego, California. The same year, she volunteered in Karamu House, speaking to young girls and participating in its "Saving Our Daughters Cinderellas on Broadway" program; she was named "Celebrity Godparent" for her work.

Trenyce played Diana Ross in a 2017 North American tour of Motown: The Musical. Her performance received positive reviews. The Times of Northwest Indiana's Eloise Marie Valdez praised her vocals, while Chicago Sun-Times' Hedy Weiss pointed to her ability to connect with the audience as a highlight. In 2022, Trenyce performed the theme song, "Good Time" for Sherri Shepherd's talk show Sherri.

== Credits ==
=== Theatre and cabaret ===
Year	Show	Role	Notes
2004	Not A Day Goes By	Yancey	North American tour January 10, 2004 – May 6, 2004
—N/a	The Vagina Monologues	—N/a	
2005	Soul Kittens Cabaret	—N/a	
2006	Mama's Sweet Potato Pie	—N/a	North American tour
2006	Dreamgirls	Deena Jones	Madame Walker Theatre Center; Scottish Rite Theater (Indianapolis); June 22, 2004 – July 2, 2004
2006	V: The Ultimate Variety Show	Host	Sahara Hotel and Casino (Las Vegas)
2006	Late Night Idol	Host	Sahara Hotel and Casino (Las Vegas)
2007	Love in the Nick of Tyme	Portia	North American tour
2009	Ain't Misbehavin'	Trenyce	North American tour
2010–13; 2015–17	Thriller – Live	Charlaine	European tour; London West End (Lyric Theatre)
2010	Ballroom with a Twist	Vocals	North American tour
2012	The Box	Host	Theatre variety; London
2015	Taboo	Host	Cabaret show; City of Dreams (Macau, China)
2017	Heart & Soul: Music of Whitney Houston, Dionne Warwick & Diana Ross	—N/a	Catalina Bar & Grill (Hollywood); Martinis Above Fourth (San Diego)
2017-2018	Motown: The Musical	Diana Ross	North American tour

=== Filmography ===
Year	Show	Role	Notes
2002–2003	American Idol (television)	Herself (contestant)	Season 2 (finalist)
2005	College Hill (television)	Herself	Performance
2007	Beauty Shop	—N/a	Cameo appearance
2008	Friends & Lovers: The Ski Trip 2	Unique	
2012	Afterglow	Vocals	Short film
2013	Kick-Ass 2	Coach Podell	

== Discography ==
=== Cast albums ===
Title	Details
Ain't Misbehavin' (The 30th Anniversary Cast Recording)	Release date: March 23, 2009; Label: Rhino Entertainment; Formats: CD, digital download
Love in the Nick of Tyme	Release date: September 7, 2010; Label: 260 Degrees Entertainment; Formats: CD, digital download

=== Singles ===
Year	Single	Album
2013	"Fever"	Non-album single
2013	"In the End ( Alright)"	Non-album single
2013	"Where Do They Go?"	Non-album single

=== Other songs ===
title	Year	Other artist(s)	Album
"Truth Hall"	2009	None	Truth Hall
"Brazil You're Ready (Synethetic)"	2014	Guy Scheiman	Brazil You're Ready (Synethetic) [feat. Trenyce] [Part 1]
"This Time"	2016	Guy Scheiman	"This Time (feat. Trenyce) - Single"
