= Craig Morgan discography =

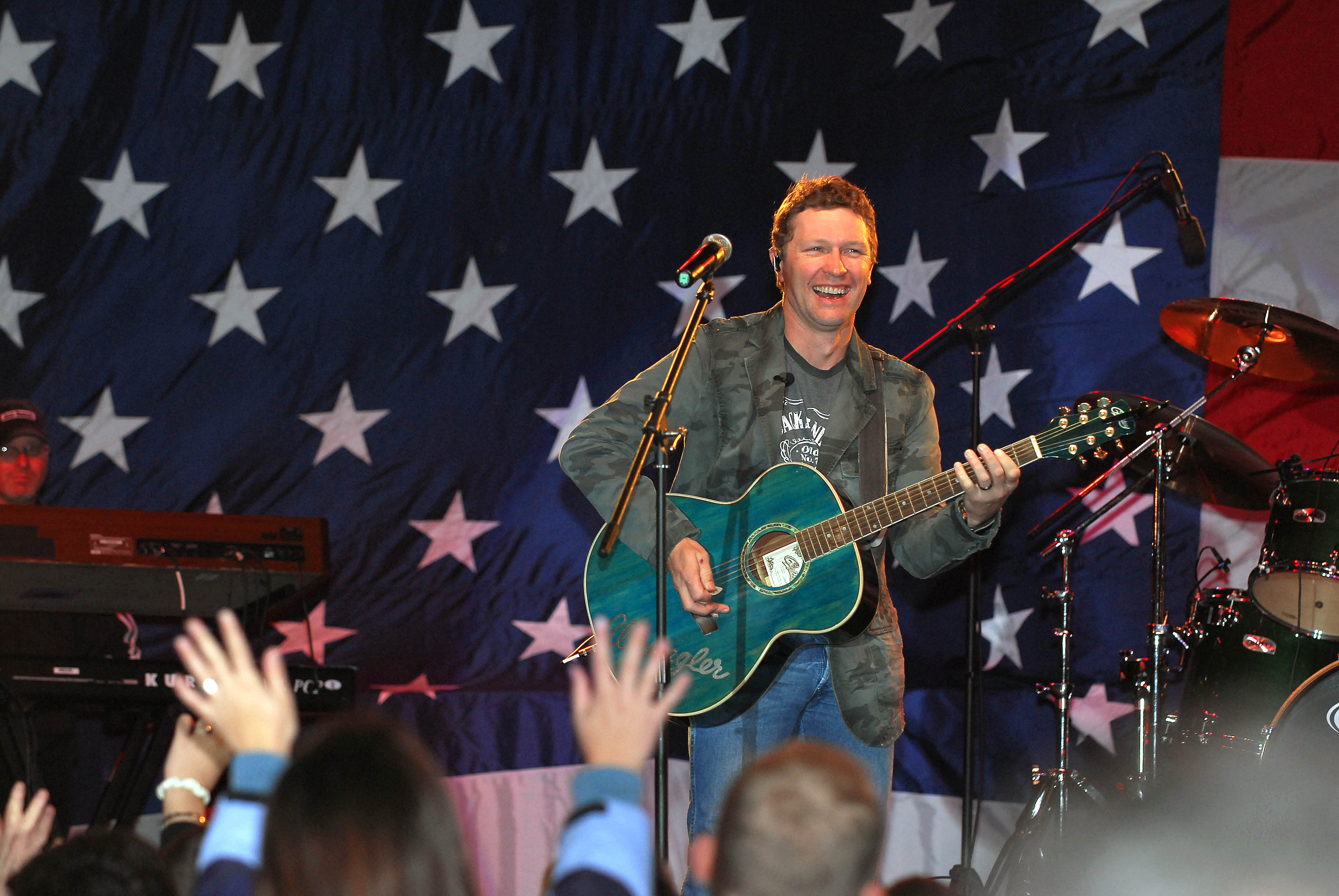
- Craig Morgan performing for the USO March 20, 2007.
- Studio albums: 7
- Extended plays: 2
- Compilation albums: 2
- Singles: 26
- Music videos: 17
- No. 1 singles: 1

Craig Morgan is an American country music artist. His discography comprises seven studio albums and two greatest hits albums, plus 26 singles. He debuted in 2000 with a self-titled album on Atlantic Records Nashville. After Atlantic closed its Nashville division in 2001, he signed to the independent Broken Bow Records and released three studio albums: I Love It, My Kind of Livin' and Little Bit of Life, released in 2003, 2005 and 2006 respectively. He also released a greatest hits album in 2007 on Broken Bow before leaving the label. In 2008, he signed to BNA Records and released That's Why, which was re-issued in 2009 with three tracks changed. My Kind of Livin' is also his best-selling and highest-charting album, having peaked at number 7 on Top Country Albums and been certified gold by the Recording Industry Association of America.

Morgan's five studio albums have accounted for seventeen singles on the Billboard Hot Country Singles charts. His highest-peaking single is "That's What I Love About Sunday", the only Number One of his career, the first Number One for the Broken Bow label, and the Number One country music single of 2005 on the Billboard Year-End charts. Six more of his singles have reached Top Ten on the country singles charts as well: "Almost Home", "Redneck Yacht Club" (certified Platinum by the RIAA), "Little Bit of Life", "International Harvester", "Love Remembers" and "Bonfire". A Christmas song, "The Kid in Me", was issued in late 2000 and was never on an album.

== Albums ==
=== Studio albums ===
Title	Album details	Peak positions			Certifications
Title	Album details	US Country	US	US Indie	Certifications
Craig Morgan	Release date: May 30, 2000; Label: Atlantic Nashville; Formats: CD, cassette, download	—	—	—	
I Love It	Release date: March 11, 2003; Label: Broken Bow Records; Formats: CD, download	16	124	4	
My Kind of Livin'	Release date: March 8, 2005; Label: Broken Bow Records; Formats: CD, download	7	40	3	RIAA: Gold
Little Bit of Life	Release date: October 31, 2006; Label: Broken Bow Records; Formats: CD, download	13	57	3	RIAA: Gold
That's Why	Release date: October 21, 2008; Label: BNA Records; Formats: CD, download	8	39	—	
This Ole Boy	Release date: February 28, 2012; Label: Black River Entertainment; Formats: CD, download	5	41	3	
A Whole Lot More to Me	Release date: June 3, 2016; Label: Black River Entertainment; Formats: CD, download	16	—	15	
"—" denotes releases that did not chart

=== Compilation albums ===
Title	Album details	Peak positions		
Title	Album details	US Country	US	US Indie
Greatest Hits	Release date: September 30, 2008; Label: Broken Bow Records; Formats: CD, download	16	113	14
The Journey (Livin' Hits)	Release date: September 3, 2013; Label: Black River Entertainment; Formats: CD, download	12	78	16
God, Family, Country	Release date: May 22, 2020; Label: BBR Music Group; Formats: CD, download	—	—	—

== Extended plays ==
Title	EP details	Peak positions
Title	EP details	US Country
This Ole Boy	Release date: November 1, 2011; Label: Black River Music Group; Formats: Download	53
Enlisted	Release date: October 20, 2023; Label: Broken Bow Records; Formats: Download	—

== Singles ==
=== 2000s ===
Year	Single	Peak positions			Certifications	Album
Year	Single	US Country Songs	US	CAN Country	Certifications	Album
2000	"Something to Write Home About"	38	—	—		Craig Morgan
2000	"Paradise"	46	—	*		Craig Morgan
2001	"I Want Us Back"	51	—	*		Craig Morgan
2002	"God, Family and Country"	49	—	*		I Love It
2002	"Almost Home"	6	59	*		I Love It
2003	"Every Friday Afternoon"	25	—	*		I Love It
2004	"Look at Us"	27	—	—		I Love It
2004	"That's What I Love About Sunday"	1	51	5	RIAA: Gold	My Kind of Livin'
2005	"Redneck Yacht Club"	2	45	9	RIAA: Platinum	My Kind of Livin'
2005	"I Got You"	12	92	25		My Kind of Livin'
2006	"Little Bit of Life"	7	75	17		Little Bit of Life
2007	"Tough"	11	76	—		Little Bit of Life
2007	"International Harvester"	10	67	28	RIAA: Gold	Little Bit of Life
2008	"Love Remembers"	9	73	32		That's Why
2009	"God Must Really Love Me"	26	—	—		That's Why
2009	"Bonfire"	4	57	34		That's Why
"—" denotes releases that did not chart
"*" denotes releases for which no chart existed at the time

=== 2010s-2020s ===
Year	Single	Peak positions				Sales	Album
Year	Single	US Country Songs	US Country Airplay	US	CAN Country	Sales	Album
2010	"This Ain't Nothin'"	13		83	44		That's Why
2010	"Still a Little Chicken Left on That Bone"	37		—	—		—N/a
2011	"This Ole Boy"	13		87	28		This Ole Boy
2012	"Corn Star"	50		—	—		This Ole Boy
2012	"More Trucks Than Cars"	38	27	—	—		This Ole Boy
2013	"Wake Up Lovin' You"	20	14	99	40	US: 243,000	The Journey (Livin' Hits)
2014	"We'll Come Back Around"	—	54	—	—		The Journey (Livin' Hits)
2015	"When I'm Gone"	—	48	—	—		A Whole Lot More to Me
2016	"I'll Be Home Soon"	—	—	—	—		A Whole Lot More to Me
2019	"The Father, My Son, and the Holy Ghost"	25	—	— (Note: "The Father, My Son, and the Holy Ghost" did not enter the Billboard Hot 100, but peaked at number 17 on the Bubbling Under Hot 100 chart.)	—	US: 57,000	God, Family, Country
2022	"How You Make a Man"	—	53	—	—		God, Family, Country
"—" denotes releases that did not chart

=== Christmas singles ===
Year	Single	Peak positions	Album
Year	Single	US Country	Album
2000	"The Kid in Me"	68	Non-album single

=== As a featured artist ===
Year	Single	Album
2011	"She Likes to Ride in Trucks" (Colt Ford featuring Craig Morgan)	Every Chance I Get

== Music videos ==
Year	Title	Director(s)
2000	"Something to Write Home About"	Tom Trail
2000	"Paradise"	Pamela Springsteen
2003	"Every Friday Afternoon"	Thom Oliphant
2005	"That's What I Love About Sunday"	Shaun Silva
2005	"Redneck Yacht Club"	Peter Zavadil
2006	"I Got You"	Wes Edwards
2006	"Little Bit of Life"	Wes Edwards
2007	"Tough"	Peter Zavadil
2007	"International Harvester"	Dallas Henry
2008	"Love Remembers"	Roman White
2009	"God Must Really Love Me"	Eric Welch
2009	"Bonfire"	Chris Hicky
2010	"This Ain't Nothin'"	Steven L. Weaver
2012	"This Ole Boy"	Kristin Barlowe
2013	"Wake Up Lovin' You"	Kristin Barlowe
2016	"I'll Be Home Soon"	Robert Chavers
2019	"The Father, My Son, and the Holy Ghost"	

== Other album appearances ==
Year	Title	Album
2011	"Some Gave All" (with Billy Ray Cyrus, Jamey Johnson and Darryl Worley)	I'm American
2011	"She Likes to Ride in Trucks" (with Colt Ford)	Every Chance I Get
