= Greatest Hits (Craig Morgan album) =

Greatest hits album by Craig Morgan
- Released: September 30, 2008
- Genre: Country
- Length: 41:46
- Label: Broken Bow
- Producer: Craig Morgan; Phil O'Donnell; Keith Stegall

Craig Morgan chronology
Little Bit of Life (2006)	Greatest Hits (2008)	That's Why (2008)

Greatest Hits is the first compilation album by American country music artist Craig Morgan. It was released on September 30, 2008, by Broken Bow Records. No new material was recorded for the project since Morgan left Broken Bow earlier in the year. "I Love It", "I'm Country", and "I Am" were never released as singles.

== Track listing ==
No.	Title	Writer(s)	Length
1.	"Almost Home"	Craig Morgan; Kerry Kurt Phillips	4:49
2.	"Redneck Yacht Club"	Thom Shepherd; Steve Williams	3:50
3.	"International Harvester"	Shane Minor; Danny Myrick; Jeffrey Steele	3:51
4.	"That's What I Love About Sunday"	Adam Dorsey; Mark Narmore	3:21
5.	"Tough"	Monty Criswell; Joe Leathers	3:17
6.	"Little Bit of Life"	Tony Mullins; Danny Wells	4:12
7.	"I Love It"	Philip Douglas; Ron Harbin; Jimmy Yeary	3:15
8.	"I'm Country"	Morgan; Galen Griffin; Phil O'Donnell	3:19
9.	"Every Friday Afternoon"	Neal Coty; Jimmy Melton	3:53
10.	"I Got You"	Morgan; O'Donnell; Tim Owens	3:53
11.	"I Am"	Morgan; Minor; O'Donnell	4:06

== Charts ==
=== Weekly charts ===
Chart (2008)	Peak position
US Billboard 200	113
US Top Country Albums (Billboard)	16
US Independent Albums (Billboard)	14

=== Year-end charts ===
Chart (2009)	Position
US Top Country Albums (Billboard)	69
