= The Journey (Livin' Hits) =

Greatest hits album by Craig Morgan
- Released: September 3, 2013
- Genre: Country
- Length: 44:37
- Label: Black River
- Producer: Craig Morgan; Phil O'Donnell

Craig Morgan chronology
| This Ole Boy (2012) | The Journey (Livin' Hits) (2013) | A Whole Lot More to Me (2016) |

Singles from The Journey (Livin' Hits)
- 1. "Wake Up Lovin' You" Released: July 8, 2013; 2. "We'll Come Back Around" Released: June 30, 2014

The Journey (Livin' Hits) is the second compilation album by American country music artist Craig Morgan. It was released on September 3, 2013, via Black River Entertainment. The album includes four new tracks, including the singles "Wake Up Lovin' You" and "We'll Come Back Around". Most of the songs featured are re-recordings.

== Track listing ==
| No. | Title | Writer(s) | Length |
|---|---|---|---|
| 1. | "Wake Up Lovin' You" | Josh Osborne, Matthew Ramsey, Trevor Rosen | 3:18 |
| 2. | "We'll Come Back Around" | Brandy Clark, Jessie Jo Dillon, Rosen | 2:58 |
| 3. | "Party Girl" | Carson Chamberlain, Wade Kirby, Jeff Stevens | 3:45 |
| 4. | "If Not Me" | Tom Douglas, Lee Thomas Miller | 3:20 |
| 5. | "More Trucks Than Cars" | Craig Morgan, Phil O'Donnell, Craig Wiseman | 3:32 |
| 6. | "This Ole Boy" | Rhett Akins, Dallas Davidson, Ben Hayslip | 4:23 |
| 7. | "International Harvester" | Shane Minor, Danny Myrick, Jeffrey Steele | 3:51 |
| 8. | "Tough" | Joe Leathers, Monty Criswell | 3:18 |
| 9. | "Little Bit of Life" | Tony Mullins, Danny Wells | 4:12 |
| 10. | "Redneck Yacht Club" | Thom Shepherd, Steve Williams | 3:50 |
| 11. | "That's What I Love About Sunday" | Adam Dorsey, Mark Narmore | 3:21 |
| 12. | "Almost Home" | Morgan, Kerry Kurt Phillips | 4:49 |

== Personnel ==
- Eddie Bayers - drums
- Jim "Moose" Brown - keyboards
- Tom Bukovac - electric guitar
- Dan Fitzsell - drum loops, programming
- Shannon Forrest - drums
- Larry Franklin - fiddle, mandolin
- Kevin "Swine" Grantt - bass guitar
- Kenny Greenberg - electric guitar
- Rob Hajacos - fiddle
- Tony Harrell - keyboards
- Wes Hightower - background vocals
- Mike Johnson - dobro, steel guitar
- Jeff King - electric guitar
- Wade Kirby - drum loops, programming
- James Mitchell - electric guitar
- Craig Morgan - lead vocals, background vocals
- Phil O'Donnell - banjo, acoustic guitar, percussion, background vocals
- Russ Pahl - jews harp
- Adam Shoenfeld - electric guitar
- Summer Shyvonne - background vocals
- Joe Spivey - fiddle, mandolin
- Russell Terrell - background vocals
- John Willis - banjo, acoustic guitar, mandolin
- Derek Wolfford - percussion

== Chart performance ==
=== Album ===
| Chart (2013) | Peak position |
|---|---|
| US Billboard 200 | 78 |
| US Top Country Albums (Billboard) | 12 |
| US Independent Albums (Billboard) | 16 |

=== Singles ===
| Year | Single | Peak chart positions | | | |
| Year | Single | US Country | US Country Airplay | US | CAN Country |
|---|---|---|---|---|---|
| 2013 | "Wake Up Lovin' You" | 20 | 14 | 99 | 40 |
| 2014 | "We'll Come Back Around" | — | 54 | — | — |
"—" denotes releases that did not chart
