= Craig Morgan (disambiguation) =

Craig Morgan (born 1965) is an American country singer.

Craig Morgan may also refer to:

- Craig Morgan (album), his debut album
- Craig Morgan (footballer) (born 1985), Welsh international footballer
- Craig Morgan (rugby union) (born 1978), Wales international rugby union player
- Craig Morgan (hurler), Irish hurler
