= That's Why (album) =

Studio album by Craig Morgan
- Released: October 21, 2008
- Studio: Starstruck Studios, Sound Stage Studios and First Tear Entertainment (Nashville, Tennessee)
- Genre: Country
- Length: 38:41
- Label: BNA Records
- Producer: Craig Morgan Phil O'Donnell

Craig Morgan chronology
Greatest Hits (2008)	That's Why (2008)	This Ole Boy (2012)

Singles from That's Why
- 1. "Love Remembers" Released: May 5, 2008; 2. "God Must Really Love Me" Released: January 20, 2009; 3. "Bonfire" Released: May 20, 2009; 4. "This Ain't Nothin'" Released: January 25, 2010

That's Why is the fifth studio album by American country music artist Craig Morgan. It was released on October 21, 2008 by BNA Records (see 2008 in country music) after his departure from Broken Bow Records earlier that same year. As with his first two Broken Bow albums — 2003's I Love It and 2005's My Kind of Livin' — Morgan co-produced the album with Phil O'Donnell. They co-wrote the lead-off single "Love Remembers", which became Morgan's sixth Top Ten hit on the Hot Country Songs charts in November 2008. Following this song was "God Must Really Love Me", which became his first single to miss the Top 20 since "Look At Us", which peaked at number 27 in 2004. A May 21, 2009, reissue replaced two songs with new songs, including "Bonfire", which was released that month as the third single. As of September 18, 2010, the album has sold 60,868 copies in the U.S.

== Content ==
On May 26, 2009, That's Why was re-issued with the new tracks "Bonfire" and "This Ain't Nothin'", which replaced "Every Red Light" and "Summer Sundown." Morgan wrote "Bonfire" with former Lyric Street Records artist Kevin Denney, as well as Mike Rogers and Tom Botkin. Released in May as the third single, it debuted at number 55 on the chart week of June 6, 2009. The song became Morgan's third top 5 hit, peaking at number 4.

== Reception ==
Professional ratings
Review scores
Source	Rating
Allmusic	3/5 stars
Country Standard Time	(favorable)
USA Today	2.5/5 stars

Stephen Thomas Erlewine, reviewing the album for Allmusic, gave it three stars out of five. He said that the production and lyrics were largely uninspired, and that most of the songs were mid-tempo in nature, but added that Morgan's "cured country croon" kept the material from sounding too much like pop music. Jessica Phillips of Country Standard Time gave a more favorable review. Although she said that his lyrics tended towards commonplace country topics such as "patriotism, family, southern pride, faith, and love", she said that the songs were "simple but profoundly observant" and that Morgan's voice recalled Randy Travis. Phillips cited "Lookin' Back with You" as one of the strongest lyrics that Morgan had written, and noted his "almost-power ballad" performance on "Love Remembers". USA Today gave the album two and a half stars and wrote, "Everyday life makes for tricky subject matter -- the best songs come alive when he gets the details just right; otherwise, they just rhyme."

== Track listing ==
No.	Title	Writer(s)	Length
1.	"Love Remembers"	Craig Morgan, Phil O'Donnell	3:57
2.	"Lookin' Back with You"	Tim James, Morgan, O'Donnell	3:57
3.	"That's Why"	Morgan, O'Donnell, Dave Turnbull	3:54
4.	"Sticks"	Galen Griffin, Gary Hannan, Morgan, O'Donnell	4:20
5.	"God Must Really Love Me"	Jim Collins, Troy Verges	3:43
6.	"Summer Sundown"	Jeremy Campbell, Morgan, O'Donnell	3:53
7.	"Every Red Light"	Monty Criswell, Rick Huckaby, Wade Kirby	3:36
8.	"It Took a Woman"	Jimmy Melton, Turnbull	3:21
9.	"Planet Her"	Kirby, Morgan, O'Donnell	3:58
10.	"Ordinary Angels"	Angelo Petraglia, Steven Lee Olsen, Richard Supa	4:02

Re-issue track listing
No.	Title	Writer(s)	Length
1.	"Love Remembers"	Morgan, O'Donnell	3:57
2.	"Bonfire"	Morgan, Kevin Denney, Mike Rogers, Tom Botkin	2:59
3.	"That's Why"	Morgan, O'Donnell, Turnbull	3:54
4.	"This Ain't Nothin'"	Kerry Kurt Phillips, Chris DuBois	4:02
5.	"God Must Really Love Me"	Collins, Verges	3:43
6.	"Lookin' Back with You"	James, Morgan, O'Donnell	3:57
7.	"Sticks"	Griffin, Hannan, Morgan, O'Donnell	4:20
8.	"It Took a Woman"	Melton, Turnbull	3:21
9.	"Planet Her"	Kirby, Morgan, O'Donnell	3:58
10.	"Ordinary Angels"	Petraglia, Olsen, Supa	4:02

Cracker Barrel re-issue track listing
No.	Title	Writer(s)	Length
1.	"Love Remembers"	Morgan, O'Donnell	3:57
2.	"Bonfire"	Morgan, Denney, Rogers, Botkin	2:59
3.	"That's Why"	Morgan, O'Donnell, Turnbull	3:54
4.	"This Ain't Nothin'"	Phillips, DuBois	4:02
5.	"God Must Really Love Me"	Collins, Verges	3:43
6.	"Lookin' Back with You"	James, Morgan, O'Donnell	3:57
7.	"Sticks"	Griffin, Hannan, Morgan, O'Donnell	4:20
8.	"It Took a Woman"	Melton, Turnbull	3:21
9.	"Planet Her"	Kirby, Morgan, O'Donnell	3:58
10.	"Ordinary Angels"	Petraglia, Olsen, Supa	4:02
11.	"You"	Jeffrey Steele, Tom Hambridge, Craig Wiseman	3:23
12.	"Summer Sundown"	Campbell, Morgan, O'Donnell	3:53
13.	"Evel Knievel"	Rodney Clawson, Monty Criswell	3:13

== Personnel ==
- Craig Morgan – lead vocals
- Jim "Moose" Brown – acoustic piano, clavinet, organ
- Charlie Judge – acoustic piano
- Jeff King – electric guitars
- Phil O'Donnell – electric guitars, backing vocals
- John Willis –acoustic guitars, banjo
- Mike Johnson – dobro, steel guitar
- Andy Leftwich – mandolin, fiddle
- Kevin "Swine" Grantt – bass
- Eddie Bayers – drums
- Shannon Forrest – drums
- Eric Darken – percussion
- Kirk "Jelly Roll" Johnson – harmonica
- Melodie Crittenden – backing vocals
- Alexandra Greer – backing vocals
- Vicki Hampton – backing vocals
- Angela Primm – backing vocals
- Russell Terrell – backing vocals, choir arrangements (10)

=== Production ===
- Renée Bell – A&R direction
- Craig Morgan – producer
- Phil O'Donnell – producer
- J.R. Rodriguez – recording
- Derek Bason – mixing
- Nathan Dickinson – digital editing
- Aaron Kasdorf – recording assistant
- Todd Tidwell – recording assistant
- Chris Ashburn – mix assistant
- Brady Barnett – additional recording
- John Napier – additional recording, additional editing
- Benny Quinn – mastering at Benny Quinn Mastering (Nashville, Tennessee)
- Lindsay Burkhalter – production assistant
- Astrid Herbold May – photography art direction
- Tracy Baskette-Fleaner – art direction, cover design
- Scott McDaniel – design
- Margaret Malandruccolo – photography
- Judy Forde Blair – creative production, liner notes
- Jennifer Kemp – stylist
- Melanie Shelley – hair design
- Robin Geary – hair, make-up
- Faith Queensberry – management for Vector Management

== Chart performance ==
=== Album ===
Chart (2008)	Peak position
U.S. Billboard Top Country Albums	8
U.S. Billboard 200	39

=== Singles ===
Year	Single	Peak chart positions	
Year	Single	US Country	US
2008	"Love Remembers"	9	73
2009	"God Must Really Love Me"	26	—
2009	"Bonfire"	4	57
2010	"This Ain't Nothin'"	13	83
"—" denotes releases that did not chart
