= Kevin Denney (album) =

Studio album by Kevin Denney
- Released: April 23, 2002
- Recorded: 2001
- Studio: Starstruck Studios; Sound Stage Studios; The Sound Kitchen; Ocean Way Studios; Emerald Entertainment; The Sound Mountain (Nashville, TN)
- Genre: Country
- Length: 39:01
- Label: Lyric Street
- Producer: Leigh Reynolds

Kevin Denney chronology
Kevin Denney (2002)	Somewhere in Between (2016)

Singles from Kevin Denney
- 1. "That's Just Jessie" Released: December 10, 2001; 2. "Cadillac Tears" Released: May 28, 2002; 3. "It'll Go Away" Released: October 21, 2002

Professional ratings
Review scores
Source	Rating
Allmusic	4/5 stars
Country Standard Time	(Favourable)

Kevin Denney is the debut studio album by American country music artist Kevin Denney, released on April 23, 2002 on Lyric Street Records. It was produced by Leigh Reynolds and was recorded at various studios around Nashville.

== Songs ==
It features the singles "That's Just Jessie", "Cadillac Tears" and "It'll Go Away", all of which charted on the Billboard Hot Country Singles & Tracks (now Hot Country Songs) charts between 2002 and 2003. "That's Just Jessie" was the highest-peaking of these three, reaching number 16 on the country charts and number 76 on the Billboard Hot 100. Following this song were "Cadillac Tears" and "It'll Go Away", which respectively reached numbers 30 and 43 on the country charts. Also included on this album is the song "Takin' Off the Edge", which was previously recorded by John Michael Montgomery on his 1992 debut album Life's a Dance.

Denney later issued a fourth single for Lyric Street entitled "A Year at a Time", released on October 6, 2003. It peaked at number 46 but was not included on an album, however, and Denney was dropped from Lyric Street's roster shortly afterward.

== Track listing ==
Kevin Denney track listing
No.	Title	Writer(s)	Length
1.	"It Doesn't Matter"	Kevin Denney; Don Sampson	3:12
2.	"Correct Me If I'm Right"	Tony Martin; Jimmy Yeary; Tom Shapiro	3:08
3.	"That's Just Jessie"	Denney; Kerry Kurt Phillips; Patrick Jason Matthews	3:52
4.	"Cadillac Tears"	Leslie Satcher; Wynn Varble	2:58
5.	"It'll Go Away"	Denney; Sampson	3:04
6.	"Takin' Off the Edge"	Larry Cordle; Larry Shell	3:24
7.	"My Kind of Song"	Denney	3:11
8.	"We Rhyme"	Jim Rushing; Bryan Kennedy	3:39
9.	"That's What I Believe"	Ruby Lovett; Varble	3:51
10.	"Ain't Skeered"	Craig Wiseman; Anthony Smith	3:51
11.	"Daddy Was a Navy Man"	Cordle; Shell	4:49
Total length:			39:01

== Personnel ==
Compiled from liner notes.

- Mike Brignardello – bass guitar
- Eric Darken – percussion
- Kevin Denney – lead vocals
- Paul Franklin – steel guitar, Dobro
- Aubrey Haynie – fiddle, mandolin
- Kirk "Jelly Roll" Johnson – harmonica
- Mike Johnson – steel guitar
- Brent Mason – electric guitar
- Steve Nathan – keyboards
- Leigh Reynolds – electric guitar
- Russell Terrell – background vocals
- Biff Watson – acoustic guitar
- Lonnie Wilson – drums

== Charts ==
Chart (2002)	Peak position
U.S. Billboard Top Country Albums	14
U.S. Billboard 200	119
U.S. Billboard Top Heatseekers	2
