= God Must Really Love Me =

Single by Craig Morgan

from the album That's Why
- Released: January 17, 2009
- Genre: Country
- Length: 3:43
- Label: BNA
- Songwriters: Jim Collins, Troy Verges
- Producers: Craig Morgan, Phil O'Donnell

Craig Morgan singles chronology
"Love Remembers" (2008)	"God Must Really Love Me" (2009)	"Bonfire" (2009)

"God Must Really Love Me" is a song recorded by American country music artist Craig Morgan. It was released in January 2009 as the second single from the album That's Why. The song reached #26 on the Billboard Hot Country Songs chart. The song was written by Jim Collins and Troy Verges.

== Content ==
The narrator describes that his life may be bad sometimes, but he knows that he's still blessed and that God must really love him.

== Critical reception ==
Leeann Ward of Country Universe gave this song a C− rating, saying that its production was "cheesy" and overdone, and that its melody was largely predictable. She also said that its message was "generic, yet irresponsible", adding, "With such logic, the reason why others aren't still alive is because God must not have really loved them?"

== Music video ==
The music video was directed by Eric Welch, and it aired in March 2009.

== Chart performance ==
Chart (2009)	Peak position
US Hot Country Songs (Billboard)	26
