= Love Remembers =

Single by Craig Morgan

from the album That's Why
- Released: May 5, 2008
- Genre: Country
- Length: 3:56 (album version); 3:49 (radio edit)
- Label: BNA
- Songwriters: Craig Morgan; Phil O'Donnell
- Producers: Craig Morgan; Phil O'Donnell

Craig Morgan singles chronology
| "International Harvester" (2007) | "Love Remembers" (2008) | "God Must Really Love Me" (2009) |

"Love Remembers" is a song co-written and recorded by American country music singer Craig Morgan. It was released in May 2008 as the first single from his fifth studio album That's Why, his first release for the BNA Records label, as well as his eleventh top 40 hit on the Billboard country charts. Morgan wrote the song with his producer, Phil O'Donnell. The accompanying music video for the song was directed by Roman White.

== Content ==
The song is a mid-tempo in which the narrator addresses a former lover, telling her that although she may not remember the details of their former relationship, that "love remembers" those details — such as "the taste of cotton candy lip gloss on the lips of a long kiss / And the plans we made together". In the second verse, he tells her that she might be driven to drink because of his memory ("You might convince yourself there's shelter in a bottle"). The radio edit omits a piano intro.

== Critical reception ==
The song received a "thumbs down" review from the country music site The 9513. Reviewer Jim Malec said of the song's production and lyrical content, "it's exceptionally disappointing to hear [Morgan] succumb to the temptations of the format", when compared to his "quirky, often twangy" works such as his 2005 single "Redneck Yacht Club". He also referred to this song as "crescendoing and over-sung", comparing it to a Rascal Flatts song. Although he did point out "vibrant, colorful imagery" in the lyrics, he added "it is a song less concerned with telling a story in sequence than it is with creating an aesthetic." Jessica Philips of Country Standard Time magazine described the song more favorably in her review of the album, saying "[it] melds together several vivid images of a love that is gone. The ending becomes an almost-power ballad, and Morgan really lets it rip."

== Music video ==
The music video was directed by Roman White and premiered in mid-2008. It features Morgan performing the song in front of a glass house while in standing water and fountain, whose faucets intensify as the song builds. The storyline is of a young couple who meet outside a bar one night, when it suddenly starts to rain. They eventually find an open car and make out in the front seats.

== Chart performance ==
| Chart (2008) | Peak position |
|---|---|
| Canada Country (Billboard) | 32 |
| US Billboard Hot 100 | 73 |
| US Hot Country Songs (Billboard) | 9 |

=== Year-end charts ===
| Chart (2008) | Position |
|---|---|
| US Country Songs (Billboard) | 50 |
