= This Ole Boy =

Studio album by Craig Morgan
- Released: February 28, 2012
- Studio: Starstruck Studios, Sound Stage Studios, Legends Studio and Black River Studios (Nashville, Tennessee)
- Genre: Country
- Length: 41:22
- Label: Black River Entertainment
- Producer: Craig Morgan Phil O'Donnell

Craig Morgan chronology
That's Why (2008)	This Ole Boy (2012)	The Journey (Livin' Hits) (2013)

Singles from This Ole Boy
- 1. "This Ole Boy" Released: July 18, 2011; 2. "Corn Star" Released: June 18, 2012; 3. "More Trucks Than Cars" Released: August 27, 2012

Professional ratings
Review scores
Source	Rating
Allmusic	3.5/5 stars
Country Weekly	3.5/5 stars
Roughstock	3.5/5 stars

This Ole Boy is the sixth studio album by American country music artist Craig Morgan. It was released on February 28, 2012 by Black River Entertainment.

== Content ==
This Ole Boy is Morgan's first release for the independent Black River Entertainment. He told Billboard that he "felt like they had more going on, and more potential as an independent than anybody out there", and compared the label to Broken Bow Records, for which he recorded from 2002 to 2007.

The first single from the album is its title track, written by Rhett Akins, Dallas Davidson and Ben Hayslip, also known as the Peach Pickers. The song was previously recorded by Joe Nichols on his 2011 album It's All Good. Morgan co-wrote seven songs on the album and co-produced it with Phil O'Donnell. Morgan co-wrote with Shane Minor and Jeffrey Steele, two of the writers of his 2007 single "International Harvester", on "Corn Star", which was released as the album's second single, and ultimately peaked after five weeks at #50 on the country chart. The album's third single, "More Trucks Than Cars", debuted at #56 on the country chart for the week of September 15, 2012.

The album's release was preceded on November 1, 2011 by a digital-exclusive extended play also titled This Ole Boy, which comprises the title track, "The World Needs a Kitchen", "Fish Weren't Bitin'", "Show Me Your Tattoo" and "Better Stories".

== Critical reception ==
Giving it three-and-a-half stars out of five, Country Weekly reviewer Jessica Nicholson said that his "standard good-ole-boy fare[…]finds Craig at his most confident and comfortable." An identical rating came from Matt Bjorke of Roughstock, who said that "Craig Morgan has certainly returned with a strong album worthy of becoming a collection of big hits."

== Track listing ==
No.	Title	Writer(s)	Length
1.	"This Ole Boy"	Rhett Akins; Dallas Davidson; Ben Hayslip	4:23
2.	"More Trucks Than Cars"	Craig Morgan; Phil O'Donnell; Craig Wiseman	3:32
3.	"The Whole World Needs a Kitchen"	Morgan; Shane Minor; O'Donnell	3:31
4.	"Country Boys Like Me"	Monty Criswell; Tim Mensy	3:28
5.	"Show Me Your Tattoo"	Skip Black; Ben Daniel	2:52
6.	"Love Loves a Long Night"	Morgan; Phillip Lammonds; O'Donnell	3:27
7.	"Being Alive and Livin'"	Morgan; Chris Wallin	3:19
8.	"Fish Weren't Bitin'"	Marty Dodson; Jimmy Yeary	3:10
9.	"Better Stories"	Criswell; Lee Thomas Miller; Michael White	3:14
10.	"I Didn't Drink"	Morgan; Kyle Jacobs; O'Donnell	3:25
11.	"Corn Star"	Minor; Jeffrey Steele	3:21
12.	"Summer Moon"	Morgan; Wallin	3:40

== Personnel ==
- Craig Morgan – lead vocals
- Jim "Moose" Brown – keyboards
- Tony Harrell – keyboards
- Tom Bukovac – electric guitars
- Kenny Greenberg – electric guitars
- Jeff King – electric guitars, guitar solo
- James Mitchell – electric guitars
- Adam Shoenfeld – electric guitars
- John Willis – acoustic guitars
- Mike Johnson – steel guitar
- Kevin "Swine" Grantt – bass
- Chad Cromwell – drums
- Shannon Forrest – drums
- Phil O'Donnell – percussion
- Russ Pahl – jew's harp
- Rob Hajacos – fiddle
- Joe Spivey – fiddle
- Perry Coleman – backing vocals
- Russell Terrell – backing vocals

=== Production ===
- Craig Morgan – producer
- Phil O'Donnell – producer
- Dan Friszell – engineer, mixing
- Justin Francis – assistant engineer
- Kellen Oleksak – assistant engineer
- Todd Tidwell – assistant engineer
- Jim DeMàin – mastering at Yes Master (Nashville, Tennessee)
- Mike "Frog" Griffith – production coordinator
- Katie McCartney – art direction
- Glenn Sweitzer – package design
- Kristin Barlowe – photography
- Jennifer Kemp – wardrobe
- Debra Wingo – grooming
- Faith Queensberry – management

== Chart performance ==
=== Album ===
Chart (2012)	Peak position
US Billboard Top Country Albums	5
US Billboard 200	41
US Billboard Independent Albums	3

=== Singles ===
Year	Single	Peak chart positions		
Year	Single	US Country	US Country Airplay	US
2011	"This Ole Boy"	13	—	87
2012	"Corn Star"	50	—	—
2012	"More Trucks Than Cars"	38	27	—
"—" denotes releases that did not chart
