= Look at Us (Craig Morgan song) =

Single by Craig Morgan

from the album I Love It
- Released: May 1, 2004
- Genre: Country
- Length: 2:35
- Label: Broken Bow
- Songwriter(s): Craig Morgan, Larry Bastian, Buddy Cannon
- Producer(s): Craig Morgan, Phil O'Donnell

Craig Morgan singles chronology
"Every Friday Afternoon" (2003)	"Look at Us" (2004)	"That's What I Love About Sunday" (2004)

"Look at Us" is a song co-written and recorded by American country music artist Craig Morgan. It was released in May 2004 as the fourth single from the album I Love It. The song reached #27 on the Billboard Hot Country Singles & Tracks chart. The song was written by Morgan, Larry Bastian and Buddy Cannon.

== Chart performance ==
Chart (2004)	Peak position
US Hot Country Songs (Billboard)	27
