= That's Just Jessie =

Single by Kevin Denney

from the album Kevin Denney
- B-side: "Correct Me If I'm Right"
- Released: December 10, 2001
- Genre: Country
- Length: 3:52
- Label: Lyric Street
- Songwriters: Kevin Denney; Kerry Kurt Phillips; Patrick Jason Matthews
- Producer: Leigh Reynolds

Kevin Denney singles chronology
"That's Just Jessie" (2001)	"Cadillac Tears" (2002)

"That's Just Jessie" is the debut single by American country music artist Kevin Denney. Penned by Denney, Kerry Kurt Phillips, and Patrick Jason Matthews, and produced by Leigh Reynolds, it was released on December 10, 2001, as the lead single to his self-titled debut studio album (2002).

== Composition ==
"That's Just Jessie" is written in the key of E major with a main chord pattern of A_{sus}-A_{sus}4-B_{sus}-B on the verses. Co-writer Kerry Kurt Phillips had the song's title and overall idea for many years, but was unable to complete it until meeting with Patrick Jason Matthews and Kevin Denney. It was Matthews' first cut as a songwriter to be released as a single.

== Critical reception ==
The Lakeland Ledger negatively described the song as "a bit sappy and cute." Country Standard Time's Jeffrey B. Remz called it one of the most "mainstream-sounding" songs off of his debut album.

== Chart performance ==
"That's Just Jessie" debuted on the US Billboard Hot Country Songs chart for the week of December 8, 2001, at number 55.

== Charts ==
=== Weekly charts ===
Chart (2001–2002)	Peak position
US Hot Country Songs (Billboard)	16
US Billboard Hot 100	76

=== Year-end charts ===
Chart (2002)	Position
US Country Songs (Billboard)	60
