= Little Bit of Life =

Studio album by Craig Morgan
- Released: October 31, 2006
- Recorded: 2005–06
- Studios: Starstruck Studios, The Sound Station and Legends Studio (Nashville, Tennessee)
- Genre: Country
- Length: 40:10
- Label: Broken Bow Records
- Producers: Craig Morgan Keith Stegall Phil O'Donnell

Craig Morgan chronology
My Kind of Livin' (2005)	Little Bit of Life (2006)	Greatest Hits (2008)

Singles from Little Bit of Life
- 1. "Little Bit of Life" Released: August 14, 2006; 2. "Tough" Released: March 12, 2007; 3. "International Harvester" Released: September 17, 2007

Professional ratings
Review scores
Source	Rating
Country Standard Time	

Little Bit of Life is the fourth studio album by American country music artist Craig Morgan. It was released on October 31, 2006 by Broken Bow Records. The album produced three singles for him on the Billboard Hot Country Songs chart. The title track and lead single from the album reached a peak of No. 7, while "Tough", its follow-up, peaked at No. 11. The third and final single, "International Harvester", reached No. 10. The album was certified Gold in February 2017.

== Track listing ==
No.	Title	Writer(s)	Length
1.	"Little Bit of Life"	Tony Mullins; Danny Wells	4:12
2.	"International Harvester"	Shane Minor; Danny Myrick; Jeffrey Steele	3:51
3.	"Tough"	Monty Criswell; Joe Leathers	3:17
4.	"I Am"	Craig Morgan; Minor; Phil O'Donnell	4:06
5.	"The Ballad of Mr. Jenkins"	Steve Mandile; D. Vincent Williams	4:28
6.	"Nothin' Goin' Wrong Around Here"	Gary Hannan; O'Donnell; Buddy Owens	3:50
7.	"Sweet Old Fashion Goodness"	Carson Chamberlain; Lee Thomas Miller; Michael White	3:17
8.	"I Guess You Had to Be There"	Morgan; O'Donnell; John Ritter	2:59
9.	"The Song"	Morgan; O'Donnell; Tim Owens	3:34
10.	"My Kind of Woman"	Morgan; O'Donnell; Jason Sellers	3:07
11.	"Look at 'Em Fly"	Jim Femino; Williams	3:29

== Personnel ==
- Craig Morgan – lead vocals
- Jim "Moose" Brown – acoustic piano, keyboards, clavinet, Hammond B3 organ
- Jeff King – electric guitars
- Phil O'Donnell – electric guitars, backing vocals
- Bryan Sutton – acoustic guitars, banjo, mandolin
- Mike Johnson – dobro, steel guitar
- Kevin "Swine" Grant – bass
- Eddie Bayers – drums
- Shannon Forrest – drums
- Paul Scholten – percussion
- Larry Franklin – fiddle
- Rob Hajacos – fiddle
- Norman E. Taylor – backing vocals
- Russell Terrell – backing vocals

=== Production ===
- Craig Morgan – producer
- Phil O'Donnell – producer
- Keith Stegall – producer
- Derek Bason – recording
- J.R. Rodriguez – recording
- Chris Ashburn – recording assistant
- Nathan Dickinson – recording assistant
- Todd Tidwell – recording assistant
- Dan Frizsell – additional recording
- Matt Rovey – additional recording
- John Kelton – mixing
- Hank Williams – mastering at MasterMix (Nashville, Tennessee)
- Jason Campbell – production coordinator
- Brad Howell – art direction
- Luellyn Latocki – art direction
- Bonnie Richardson – graphic design
- Kristin Barlowe – photography
- Tina Crawford – label copy

== Chart performance ==
=== Weekly charts ===
Chart (2006)	Peak position
US Billboard 200	57
US Top Country Albums (Billboard)	13
US Independent Albums (Billboard)	3

=== Year-end charts ===
Chart (2007)	Position
US Top Country Albums (Billboard)	59
Chart (2008)	Position
US Top Country Albums (Billboard)	42

=== Singles ===
Year	Single	Peak chart positions	
Year	Single	US Country	US
2006	"Little Bit of Life"	7	75
2007	"Tough"	11	76
2007	"International Harvester"	10	67

== Certifications ==
Region	Certification	Certified units/sales
United States (RIAA)	Gold	500,000^{‡}
^{‡} Sales+streaming figures based on certification alone.
