= Cadillac Tears =

Single by Kevin Denney

from the album Kevin Denney
- Released: June 15, 2002
- Genre: Country
- Length: 2:58
- Label: Lyric Street
- Songwriter(s): Leslie Satcher, Wynn Varble
- Producer(s): Leigh Reynolds

Kevin Denney singles chronology
"That's Just Jessie" (2001)	"Cadillac Tears" (2002)	"It'll Go Away" (2002)

"Cadillac Tears" is a song recorded by American country music artist Kevin Denney. It was released in June 2002 as the second single from the album Kevin Denney. The song reached #30 on the Billboard Hot Country Singles & Tracks chart. The song was written by Leslie Satcher and Wynn Varble.

== Content ==
The song is about a divorcee who extravagantly spends the money that she has received in her settlement, such as a new Cadillac automobile.

== Chart performance ==
Chart (2002)	Peak position
US Hot Country Songs (Billboard)	30
