= Something to Write Home About (song) =

Single by Craig Morgan

from the album Craig Morgan
- B-side: "302 South Maple Avenue"
- Released: February 26, 2000
- Genre: Country
- Length: 3:25
- Label: Atlantic
- Songwriters: Craig Morgan, Tony Ramey
- Producers: Buddy Cannon, Norro Wilson

Craig Morgan singles chronology
"Something to Write Home About" (2000)	"Paradise" (2000)

"Something to Write Home About" is a debut song co-written and recorded by American country music artist Craig Morgan. It was released in February 2000 as the first single from the album Craig Morgan. The song reached #38 on the Billboard Hot Country Singles & Tracks chart. The song was written by Morgan and Tony Ramey.

== Chart performance ==
Chart (2000)	Peak position
US Hot Country Songs (Billboard)	38
