= A Whole Lot More to Me =

Studio album by Craig Morgan
- Released: June 3, 2016
- Studios: Sound Stage Studios and Essential Sound Studios (Nashville, Tennessee)
- Genre: Country
- Label: Black River Entertainment
- Producers: Byron Gallimore Craig Morgan

Craig Morgan chronology
The Journey (Livin' Hits) (2013)	A Whole Lot More to Me (2016)

Singles from A Whole Lot More to Me
- 1. "When I'm Gone" Released: September 21, 2015; 2. "I'll Be Home Soon" Released: May 16, 2016

A Whole Lot More to Me is the seventh studio album by American country music artist Craig Morgan. It was released on June 3, 2016 by Black River Entertainment. It includes the singles "When I'm Gone" and "I'll Be Home Soon".

== Reception ==
The album debuted at No. 16 on the Top Country Albums chart, with 3,500 copies sold in the first week. The album has sold 7,100 copies in the United States as of July 2016.

== Track listing ==
No.	Title	Writer(s)	Length
1.	"I'll Be Home Soon"	Justin Ebach, Steven Dale Jones, John King	3:05
2.	"Living on Memories"	Craig Morgan, Scott Stepakoff, Josh Osborne	3:14
3.	"All Cried Out"	Wendell Mobley, Neil Thrasher, busbee	3:47
4.	"A Whole Lot More to Me"	Morgan, Mike Rogers	4:14
5.	"Hearts I Leave Behind" (featuring Mac Powell)	Nick Sturms, Travis Meadows	3:26
6.	"Country Side of Heaven"	Eric Paslay, Dylan Altman, Shane McAnally	3:42
7.	"Nowhere Without You"	Michael McDonald, John Goodwin	3:42
8.	"I'm That Country"	Morgan, Rogers, Kevin Denney, Tom Botkin	3:28
9.	"When I'm Gone"	Ebach, Jones	3:45
10.	"Who Would It Be"	Altman, Will Hoge, Gordie Sampson	2:56
11.	"Remind Me Why I'm Crazy"	Morgan, Jim McBride, Phil O'Donnell	3:42
12.	"Can't Wait to Stay"	Morgan, O'Donnell	3:23
Total length:			42:24

== Personnel ==
- Craig Morgan – vocals
- Steve Nathan – keyboards
- Byron Gallimore – keyboards, strings, electric guitars
- Troy Lancaster – electric guitars
- Danny Rader – acoustic guitars, banjo, bouzouki
- Ilya Toshinsky – acoustic guitars
- Paul Franklin – steel guitar
- Larry Franklin – mandolin, fiddle
- David LaBruyere – bass
- Tony Lucido – bass
- Shannon Forrest – drums, percussion
- Will Hoge – harmonica
- Greg Barnhill – backing vocals
- Tania Hancheroff – backing vocals
- Wes Hightower – backing vocals
- Angela Primm – backing vocals
- Mac Powell – vocals (5)

=== Production ===
- Craig Morgan – producer
- Byron Gallimore – producer, mixing
- Julian King – tracking engineer
- Erik Lutkins – Pro Tools operator, overdub engineer, mix assistant
- Justin Francis – tracking assistant
- Kam Luchterhand – tracking assistant (2, 5)
- Stephen Allbritten – overdub assistant, mix assistant
- Adam Ayan – mastering at Gateway Mastering (Portland, Maine)
- Robert Chaveis – art direction, package design
- Joseph Llanes – photography
- Jana Hilton – grooming
- John Murphy – wardrobe
- Red Light Management – management

== Chart performance ==
=== Albums ===
Chart (2016)	Peak position
US Top Country Albums (Billboard)	16
US Independent Albums (Billboard)	15

=== Singles ===
Year	Single	Peak positions
Year	Single	US Country Airplay
2015	"When I'm Gone"	48
2016	"I'll Be Home Soon"	—
