= Tony Ramey =

American singer-songwriter (born 1974)

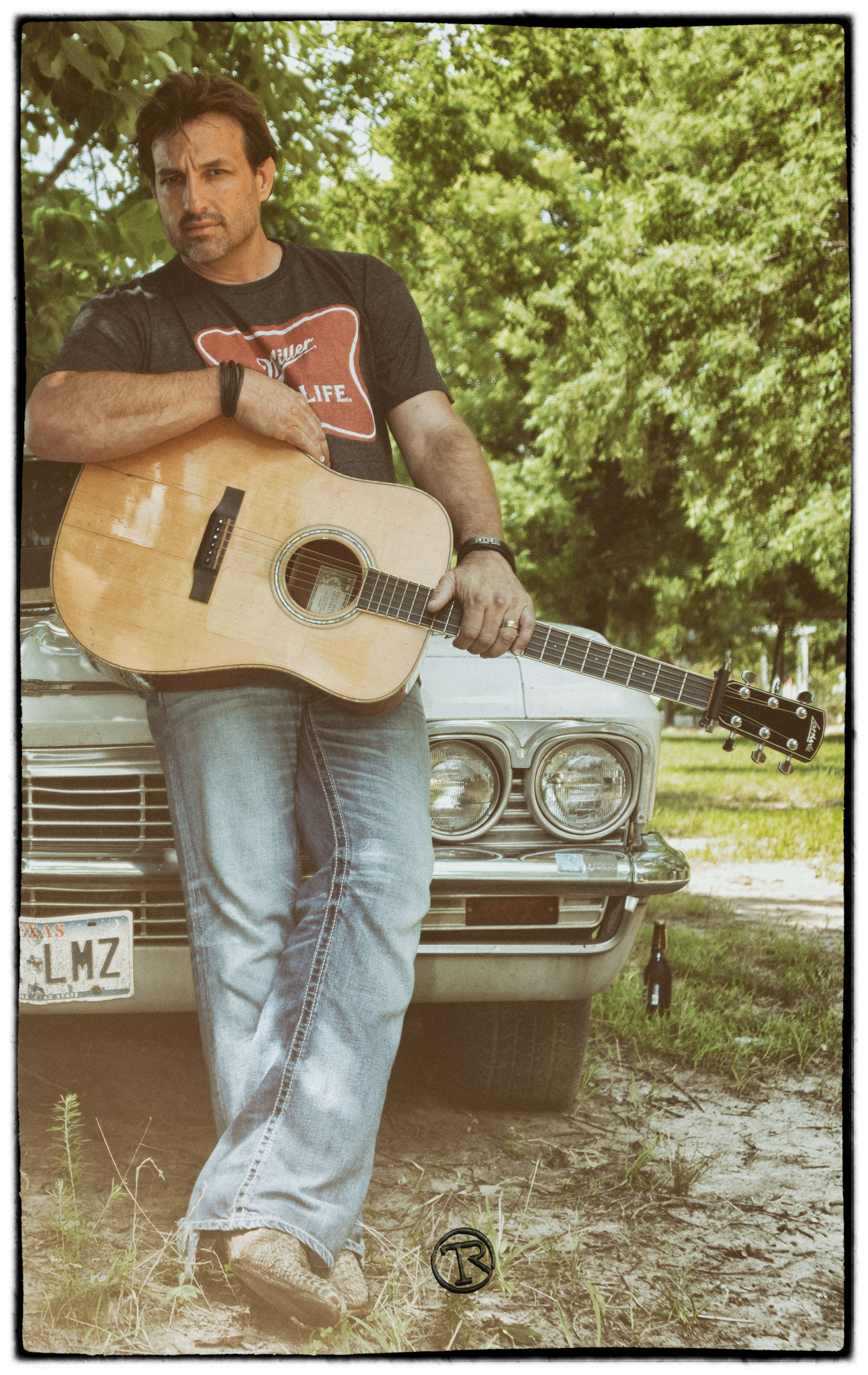
Official Photo - Tony Ramey

Tony Ramey is an Americana and Country Music singer and songwriter. During his career, he has recorded eleven albums and EPs and had dozens of songs recorded by other country music artists. His repertoire of songs reaches over 3,400 in number and his songwriting career spans twenty-four years as a professional. Ramey wrote and performed the title song for the movie, The Last Ride a fact-based drama about the final days of troubled country-music legend Hank Williams. His music can also be heard on the soundtrack for Pure Country 2: The Gift. He has performed a duet with Willie Nelson on his Soul Survivor album, which brought some acclaim to his status as a troubadour. His songs have appeared in television as well on daytime drama series “The Young and the Restless” and on outdoor television shows such as “Canada in the Rough”.

== Early life ==
(Tony) Anthony Ramey was born on April 17, 1974, in Kenova, West Virginia. He grew up in Kenova where his father was a journeyman for Owens-Illinois Glass Company and his mother was a law department assistant. Tony has one older brother, Aca Ramey, a federal park ranger in Huntington, WV for the U.S. Army Corps of Engineers.

Tony began earning royalties from his songs when he was only seventeen years old—garnering song credits on Nashville independent artists and acts working out of Branson Missouri.

After graduating from Ceredo-Kenova High School, Tony earned bachelor's and master's degrees in English Literature at Marshall University. While in college, Tony formed the Dixie Flyer Band, a country music cover band who also played Tony's original songs he had begun writing at the age of 11. After winning the True-Value Country Showdown, Dixie Flyer toured extensively throughout Ohio, Kentucky, Virginia, and West Virginia, performing at fairs, festivals, and other music venues. Tony moved to Nashville and later worked on a PhD in English Literature with Concentrations in Old English, Romanticism, and American Literature. His scholarship and work in Samuel Taylor Coleridge garnered a Wolfe Award from MTSU's graduate school for excellence in critical writing and research.

== Music career ==
Ramey's frequent performances included opening for Billy Ray Cyrus, Dan Seals, Reba McEntire, Lorrie Morgan, George Jones, Keith Whitley, Glen Campbell, and other Country Music artists.

Ramey was offered a deal on Polydor Polygram/Mercury Records, but shortly thereafter the Polygram division was bought by A&M of California and the Nashville office was closed. Ramey began working with Tom Collins, a producer and publisher on Nashville's Music Row. Ramey's first gold record as a songwriter, "I Don't Want This Song to End, was recorded by John Michael Montgomery.

Several years later, Tony and Tom Collins amicably parted ways. Not long after, Ramey was invited to do a songwriting round at the Bluebird Café. While performing at Bluebird, Ramey was seen by the creative director of Muy Bueno Music, owned by country music artist George Strait. While at Muy Bueno, Ramey amassed a catalog of more than 900 songs and several country Top Forty, international Top Forty, and gold record and platinum record hits.

In 2007, Tony left Muy Bueno to sign with Cherry Lane Music of New York, which began by publishing songs from the iconic John Denver and Elvis Presley. Ramey's songs were performed on television and in film, and by Canadian, Australian, and European musicians. While at Cherry Lane, Ramey produced and released his self-titled fifth studio album.

When BMG Germany acquired Cherry Lane in 2010, Ramey joined Davis Music Group in Nashville as creative director/songwriter for the company's publishing division. His stint there would only last a year and the road would call him out again to begin touring as a troubadour.

In the spring of 2011, Tony moved to Greenville, Texas, where he is continuing to write music, and has undertaken a concert tour throughout the US. After moving to Texas, he recorded CDs Throwback, Soul Survivor (which features Willie Nelson), and The Spirit of Hank and the Heart of James Dean. He is the recipient of the Country Music Association of Texas Independent Artist of the Year Award in 2016. In 2015, Country Music icon Ray Price recorded a song Tony co-wrote called "No More Songs to Sing" for his Beauty Is: The Last Sessions Album. Most recently (2015-16), Mark Chesnutt recorded Tony Ramey's song "Oughta Miss Me By Now" and Marcus Lindsey of The Marcus Lindsey Band recorded "Too Much Ain't Enough" in 2015 for his self-titled debut album Marcus Lindsey. His song credits on current releases include the 2018 Spotify and Texas Country Radio hit "Any Night in Texas," the title song from Jon Wolfe's 2018 album release, and "A Country Boy's Life Well Lived from the same collection."

== Career and awards ==
Gold records

- I Don't Want This Song To End by John Michael Montgomery (Album: Leave A Mark)
- Second Chance by Trisha Yearwood (Album: Inside Out)
- Hot Grease and Zydeco by George Strait (Album: Twang)
- Something To Write Home About by Craig Morgan (Album: Craig Morgan)

Awards

- “American Idol Underground” - Winner, Country music genre (March 2006)
- "Country Music Association of Texas" - Winner, Independent Artist of the Year Award (2016)
- "Broadcast Music Incorporated" - Winner, BMI Award for "Make Up in Love" as one of the most played songs of 2000.

=== Songwriter's credits ===
Song	Recorded By	Label	Album	Year
I Don't Want This Song To End	John Michael Montgomery	Atlantic	Leave A Mark	1998
Make Up In Love	Doug Stone	Atlantic	Make Up In Love	1999
Something To Write Home About	Craig Morgan	Atlantic	Craig Morgan	2000
Second Chance	Trisha Yearwood	MCA	Inside Out	2002
Lonesome Wind	Stevens Sisters	Rounder Records	Little By Little	2002
Kings For A Day	Jake Mathews	Open Road/EMI (Canada)	Time After Time	2003
The Ride Of My Life	Kelly Kenning	Airastar Records	Ride Of My Life	2004
Weekend In Juarez	Kelly Kenning	Airastar Records	Ride Of My Life	2004
Watertower Skyline	Tony Ramey	Airastar Records	Places	2004
Let Me Be Lonely	Tony Ramey	Airastar Records	Places	2004
That's How I's Raised	Kevin Denny	Lyric Street Records	Unreleased	2005
Hot Grease and Zydeco	George Strait	MCA	Twang	2008
Never Been To Texas	Jason Meadows	Baccerstick Records	You Ain't Never Been To Texas	2008
Second Chance	Katrina Elam	Black River Records	Pure Country 2: The Gift (Soundtrack)	2010
Too Much Ain't Enough	Clinton Gregory	Melody Round Up	Too Much Ain't Enough	2011
The Last Ride	Tony Ramey	Live Bait/Curb Records	The Last Ride (Soundtrack)	2011
Hold A Woman	Bucky Covington	eOne Music	Good Guys	2011
Summertime Girl	Aaron Watson	Big Label Records	Real Good Time	2012
Broke Down In Georgia	Bobby Cyrus	BGC Records	Home Place	2012
His New Baby	Jon Wolfe	Warner Bros.	It All Happened In A Honky Tonk	2013
That's How I Was Raised	Alabama	Show Dog-Universal	Alabama and Friends	2014
No More Songs to Sing	Ray Price	Amerimonte Records	Beauty Is	2015
Broken Bones	Moe Bandy	Bandy Productions, LLC	Lucky Me	2015
Oughta Miss Me By Now	Mark Chesnutt	Nada Dinero	Tradition Lives	2016
Too Much Ain't Enough	Marcus Lindsey	Vision Records	Marcus Lindsey	2016
Any Night in Texas	Jon Wolfe	Fool Hearted Productions	Any Night in Texas	2018
Country Boy's Life Well Lived	Jon Wolfe	Fool Hearted Productions	Any Night in Texas	2018

=== Discography ===
- Tony Ramey and the Dixie Flyer Band (Copper Creek Records, 1994)
- True Calling (Copper's Creek Records, 1997)
- Places (Music Mill/Copper Creek Records, 2004)
- Tony Ramey (Airastar/Copper Creek Records, 2006)
- Is It Worth My Broken Heart (EverSong Records, 2008)
- Once Again (Dig It Deep Records, 2010)
- Throwback (Dig It Deep Records, 2012)
- Soul Survivor (Dig It Deep Records, 2014)
- Spirit of Hank and the Heart of James Dean (Rhyme Heart Records, 2016)
- I've Always Had a Song (Rhyme Heart Records, 2019)

Re-mastered Releases

- Places (Rhyme Heart Records 2018)
- Soul Survivor (Rhyme Heart Records 2018)

Singles

- "Into the Sun (Rhyme Heart Records 2018)
