= This Ain't Nothin' =

Single by Craig Morgan

from the album That's Why
- Released: January 25, 2010
- Genre: Country
- Length: 4:02
- Label: BNA
- Songwriters: Chris DuBois; Kerry Kurt Phillips
- Producers: Craig Morgan; Phil O'Donnell

Craig Morgan singles chronology
"Bonfire" (2009)	"This Ain't Nothin'" (2010)	"Still a Little Chicken Left on That Bone" (2010)

"This Ain't Nothin" is a song written by Chris DuBois and Kerry Kurt Phillips, and recorded by American country music artist Craig Morgan. It was released in January 2010 as the fourth single from his album That's Why. It is only available on later presses of the album. The song entered the top 40 on the U.S. country charts on February 2, 2010. It is his seventeenth single release.

== Content ==
When a reporter asks an old man about the tornado that has just destroyed his home, the man recounts some of the people he has lost during his life – a father, a brother, a best friend, his left hand, and, most recently, his wife of fifty years – and explains that losing a measly house “ain’t nothin’” by comparison. Unlike his deep-down emotional bruises, the rubble in which he stands “ain’t nothin’ time won’t erase” and “ain’t nothin’ money can’t replace.”

== Critical reception ==
The song was met with mainly positive reviews. Matt Bjorke of Roughstock also gave the song a favorable review. He said that it was "a sweet song about the human condition and how we manage to adjust and pull ourselves up from our bootstraps, despite how bad things may seem." Bjorke also said that Morgan truly shines on these types of songs and that it deserves to be a big hit.

== Music video ==
The music video was directed by Steven L. Weaver and premiered in early 2010.

== Chart performance ==
"This Ain't Nothin'" debuted at number 97 on the U.S. Billboard Hot 100 chart for the week of July 3, 2010.

Chart (2010)	Peak position
Canada Country (Billboard)	44
US Hot Country Songs (Billboard)	13
US Billboard Hot 100	83

=== Year-end charts ===
Chart (2010)	Position
US Country Songs (Billboard)	49
