= Wake Up Lovin' You =

Single by Craig Morgan

from the album The Journey (Livin' Hits)
- Released: July 8, 2013
- Genre: Country
- Length: 3:18
- Label: Black River
- Songwriters: Josh Osborne; Matthew Ramsey; Trevor Rosen
- Producers: Craig Morgan; Phil O'Donnell

Craig Morgan singles chronology
"More Trucks Than Cars" (2012)	"Wake Up Lovin' You" (2013)	"We'll Come Back Around" (2014)

"Wake Up Lovin' You" is a song written by Josh Osborne, Matthew Ramsey and Trevor Rosen, and sung by American country music singer Craig Morgan. It was released in July 2013 as the first single from his second compilation album The Journey (Livin' Hits) (2013). The track is a midtempo ballad about a man unable to forget his former lover despite his actions. The song received positive reviews from critics. "Wake Up Lovin' You" peaked at numbers 14 and 20 on both the Billboard Country Airplay and Hot Country Songs charts respectively. It also reached number 99 on the Hot 100 for two non-consecutive weeks. The song also charted in Canada, peaking at number 40 on the Country chart. A music video for the single was directed by Kristin Barlowe.

== Content ==
"Wake Up Lovin' You" is a midtempo ballad about a man who, despite being parted from his lover, is unable to forget her despite his actions.

Morgan told The Boot that "I really believe that this will be the song of my career, because it’s a turning point."

== Critical reception ==
Giving it a "B+", Joseph Hudak of Country Weekly compared the song's theme favorably to "Sunday Mornin' Comin' Down" by Kris Kristofferson, and said that the song was "dark stuff" for Morgan. It received 4 out of 5 stars from Billy Dukes of Taste of Country, who wrote that "The strength of the vocals rub against the vulnerability of the lyrics and story. The production plays a role in creating this big sturdy ballad, as well."

== Commercial performance ==
"Wake Up Lovin' You" received sufficient airplay to enter the Billboard Country Airplay chart at number 57 for the chart dated July 27, 2013. It also debuted on the Hot Country Songs chart at number 50 on the week of November 9. The song reached number 20 on the Hot Country Songs chart for the week of April 26, 2014, and spent a total of 27 weeks on that chart. It also peaked at number 14 on the Country Airplay chart dated May 10, and spent a total of 45 weeks on the chart. On the Billboard Hot 100, the single debuted and peaked at number 99 for the week of May 10, 2014, but left the next week. It reappeared in the same position on the week of May 31, before leaving the chart completely. The song has sold 243,000 copies in the U.S. as of May 2014.

In Canada, the track debuted at number 49 on the Canada Country chart for the week of March 22, 2014, and peaked at number 40 the week of April 26, staying on the chart for 12 weeks.

== Music video ==
Kristin Barlowe directed the song's music video.

== Chart performance ==
Chart (2013–2014)	Peak position
Canada Country (Billboard)	40
US Billboard Hot 100	99
US Country Airplay (Billboard)	14
US Hot Country Songs (Billboard)	20

=== Year-end charts ===
Chart (2014)	Position
US Country Airplay (Billboard)	63
US Hot Country Songs (Billboard)	73

== Covers ==
Two of the original songwriters, Matthew Ramsey and Trevor Rosen, are members of the band Old Dominion, who perform the song regularly at concerts and has recorded their own cover.
