= Craig Morgan (album) =

Studio album by Craig Morgan
- Released: May 30, 2000
- Studio: Emerald Sound Studios (Nashville, Tennessee)
- Genre: Country
- Length: 38:13
- Label: Atlantic Records
- Producer: Buddy Cannon Norro Wilson

Craig Morgan chronology
Craig Morgan (2000)	I Love It (2003)

Singles from Craig Morgan
- 1. "Something to Write Home About" Released: February 26, 2000; 2. "Paradise" Released: 2000; 3. "I Want Us Back" Released: 2001

Professional ratings
Review scores
Source	Rating
Country Standard Time	

Craig Morgan is the debut studio album by American country music artist of the same name. It was released on May 30, 2000 by Atlantic Records. It was produced the singles "Paradise", "I Want Us Back", and "Something to Write Home About", which peaked at number 39 on the U.S. country charts. "Everything's a Thing" was later recorded by its co-writer Joe Nichols on his 2002 album Man with a Memory.

== Track listing ==
No.	Title	Writer(s)	Length
1.	"Paradise"	Craig Morgan; Harley Allen	3:36
2.	"I Want Us Back"	Marla Cannon-Goodman; Buddy Cannon; Dean Dillon	3:07
3.	"Something to Write Home About"	Morgan; Tony Ramey	3:25
4.	"302 South Maple Avenue"	Morgan; Paul Harrison	4:16
5.	"It's Me"	Morgan; Steve Dean; Wil Nance	2:22
6.	"When a Man Can't Get a Woman Off His Mind"	Bill Anderson; Sharon Vaughn	3:36
7.	"Everything's a Thing"	Dean; Nance; Joe Nichols	3:12
8.	"Walking in My Father's Shoes"	Morgan; Jeff Knight	3:29
9.	"Hush"	Morgan; Anderson; Cannon	2:56
10.	"Everywhere I Go"	Morgan; Cannon-Goodman	3:45
11.	"I Wish I Could See Bakersfield" (featuring Merle Haggard)	Cannon	4:29

== Personnel ==
- Craig Morgan – vocals
- John Hobbs – keyboards
- Steve Cropper, John Jorgenson – electric guitars
- B. James Lowry – electric guitars, acoustic guitars
- Larry Paxton – bass guitar
- Randy Hardison – drums, percussion
- Rob Hajacos – fiddle
- Jim Horn – baritone saxophone
- Charles Rose – trombone
- Melonie Cannon – backing vocals
- Ted Hewitt – backing vocals
- Merle Haggard – vocals (11)

=== Production ===
- Buddy Cannon – producer
- Norro Wilson – producer
- Lou Bradley – engineer
- Bob Bullock – engineer
- Jason Piske – engineer
- Chris Rowe – engineer
- Billy Sherrill – engineer
- Jim Cotton – mixing
- Nick Long – art direction

== Chart performance ==
=== Singles ===
Year	Single	Peak positions
Year	Single	US Country
2000	"Something to Write Home About"	38
2000	"Paradise"	46
2001	"I Want Us Back"	51
