= Kevin Denney =

American singer-songwriter

- Born: January 27, 1978 (age 48)
- Genre: Country
- Occupation: Singer-songwriter
- Instruments: Vocals, acoustic guitar
- Years active: 2001–present
- Label: Lyric Street

Kevin Denney (born January 27, 1978) is an American country music artist. Signed to Lyric Street Records in 2001, he made his debut on the country music scene with the release of his self-titled album (2002's Kevin Denney), which produced three chart singles, including "That's Just Jessie", a Top 20 hit on the Billboard Hot Country Singles & Tracks (now Hot Country Songs) charts. He was dropped from Lyric Street's roster in 2003, although he co-wrote a track on Tracy Byrd's 2006 Different Things album.

== Biography ==
Denney's interest in music began at an early age. His mother and father, both of whom sang in a gospel music quartet, bought Denney his first guitar when he was three years old. He also became a frequent listener of the Grand Ole Opry radio shows, and played in his cousin's bluegrass music band.

At age 17, however, he briefly stopped focusing on his musical interests to re-assess his future. On his eighteenth birthday, his girlfriend took him to a George Strait concert. Seeing Strait in concert helped Denney discover that music was his passion, and he later joined a local band that was looking for a lead singer. Denney later went solo, and was signed to Lyric Street Records in 2001. His eponymous debut album, released in 2002, produced three charting singles on the Hot Country Songs charts: "That's Just Jessie" at number 16, "Cadillac Tears" at number 30 and "It'll Go Away" at number 43. He also contributed a rendition of "White Christmas" to the label's multi-artist compilation No Wrapping Required.

In late 2003, Denney charted a fourth single, "A Year at a Time," which peaked at number 44 on the country charts. The song did not appear on an album, and Denney exited the label.

He co-wrote a track on Tracy Byrd's 2006 album Different Things, and Craig Morgan's 2009 single "Bonfire." He also co-wrote "Don't Ask Me About a Woman", a song recorded by Easton Corbin on his 2010 self-titled debut album.

== Discography ==
=== Studio albums ===
Title	Album details	Peak chart positions		
Title	Album details	US Country	US	US Heat
Kevin Denney	Release date: April 23, 2002; Label: Lyric Street Records	14	119	2
Something in Between	Release date: June 24, 2016; Label: KDM Records	—	—	—
"—" denotes releases that did not chart

=== Singles ===
Year	Single	Peak chart positions		Album
Year	Single	US Country	US	Album
2001	"That's Just Jessie"	16	76	Kevin Denney
2002	"Cadillac Tears"	30	—	Kevin Denney
2003	"It'll Go Away"	43	—	Kevin Denney
2003	"A Year at a Time"	44	—	—N/a
2016	"Ain't Gonna Hurt Nobody but Me"	—	—	Something in Between
"—" denotes releases that did not chart

=== Music videos ===
Year	Video	Director
2002	"That's Just Jessie"	Peter Zavadil
2003	"A Year at a Time"	Brent Hedgecock
