= Bonfire (Craig Morgan song) =

- Christmas version

Single by Craig Morgan

from the album That's Why
- Released: May 20, 2009
- Genre: Country
- Length: 2:59
- Label: BNA
- Songwriters: Tom Botkin; Kevin Denney; Craig Morgan; Mike Rogers
- Producers: Craig Morgan; Phil O'Donnell

Craig Morgan singles chronology
"God Must Really Love Me" (2009)	"Bonfire" (2009)	"This Ain't Nothin'" (2010)

"Bonfire" is a song co-written and recorded by American country music artist Craig Morgan. It was released in May 2009 as the third single from his album That's Why. It is only available on later presses of the album. The song entered the top 40 on the U.S. country charts in June 2009. It is his sixteenth single release. A Christmas version with new lyrics was released on November 24, 2009. Morgan wrote the song with Kevin Denney, Tom Botkin and Mike Rogers. To date, it is his last Top 10 Hit on the Hot Country Songs Chart.

== Content ==
"Bonfire" is an up-tempo with electric guitar accompaniment. In it, the narrator describes a summertime party around a bonfire. The partiers are described in the first verse, while the second verse tells of a police officer showing up, causing the partiers to hide their beers. The officer then takes a beer himself and states that he "came to hang out / at the bonfire, out in the sticks[…]".

== Critical reception ==
The song received mixed reviews. Andrew Lacy of Engine 145 gave the song a thumbs-down rating. He described it as an "annual summer ritual of artists and labels competing to see who can release the most popular anthem by attempting to recapture the fun and flavor of [Morgan's 2005 single] 'Redneck Yacht Club'." Lacy also said that the lyrics, melody and production were "forgettable", and that the heavy production made Morgan shout instead of sing. Matt Bjorke of Roughstock gave a more favorable review. Although he also said that the song was similar in theme to "Redneck Yacht Club", he said that its heavier production made it stand out on the re-released album, and gave it an "exciting" sound.

== Music video ==
The music video was directed by Chris Hicky and premiered in mid-2009.

== Chart performance ==
Chart (2009–2010)	Peak position
Canada Country (Billboard)	34
US Billboard Hot 100	57
US Hot Country Songs (Billboard)	4

=== Year-end charts ===
Chart (2009)	Position
US Country Songs (Billboard)	50
