= Ruby Lovett =

American country music singer-songwriter (born 1967)

- Born: February 16, 1967 (age 59); Laurel, Mississippi
- Genre: Country
- Occupation: Singer-songwriter
- Years active: 1997–1998
- Label: Curb
- Website: www.rubylovett.com

Ruby Lovett (born February 16, 1967, in Laurel, Mississippi) is an American country music singer-songwriter. Lovett was put up for adoption as a baby. She cut a 45 rpm recording of "One Day at a Time" and "Me and Jesus" when she was 6 years old. She later entered local talent contests and won the True Value Country Showdown three years in a row. She started writing songs at age 10 and formed a band at age 13.

Lovett's mother encouraged her to perform but also to get an education. She studied to become a Radiographer and was working at a hospital in Nashville when she was offered a recording contract. Lovett signed with Curb Records who released her debut album, Ruby Lovett, in January 1998. Its only single, "Look What Love Can Do", peaked at number 73 on the Billboard Hot Country Singles & Tracks chart.

== Ruby Lovett (1998) ==
Ruby Lovett

Studio album by Ruby Lovett
- Released: January 13, 1998
- Genre: Country
- Length: 40:10
- Label: Curb
- Producers: Allen Reynolds; Shelby Kennedy; Jimmy Metts

Professional ratings
Review scores
Source	Rating
Allmusic	3/5 stars
Los Angeles Times	3/4 stars

=== Critical reception ===
Thom Owens of Allmusic gave Ruby Lovett three stars out of five, writing that it is "a fine collection of urbane country music that emphasizes her nuanced vocals and skill at interpretation." Randy Lewis of the Los Angeles Times gave the album three stars out of four, saying that it "benefits further from songs, both her own and by other writers, that prize honest emotion over cliche." The album received a favorable review from People, which wrote that Lovett is "an emotional country singer" with "an eclectic mix of songs." Chet Flippo of Billboard also gave the album a positive review, saying that Lovett is the "possessor of a big, expressive voice and a confident delivery" and the album's production is "beautiful, unobtrusive – and very country." Eric Zehnbauer of Country Standard Time praised Lovett's "rich and evocative" voice and wrote that "she infuses her songs with plenty of emotion."

=== Track listing ===
No.	Title	Writer(s)	Length
1.	"True Love Never Dies"	Gary Scruggs, Kevin Welch	4:08
2.	"Nothing to Prove"	Terry Burns, Jim Rushing	3:51
3.	"(I'm So) Afraid of Losing You Again"	Dallas Frazier, A.L. "Doodle" Owens	3:32
4.	"Little Bitty Crack in His Heart"	Shawn Camp, Rushing	2:55
5.	"Look What Love Can Do"	Hunter Davis, Ruby Lovett, Taylor Pie	4:00
6.	"That Train Don't Stop Here Anymore"	Mike Henderson, John Scott Sherrill	2:30
7.	"Crazy Enough"	Cathy Majeski, Sunny Russ, Stephony Smith	3:31
8.	"Your Love Speaks Louder Than Words"	Randy Hardison, Lovett, Wynn Varble	2:52
9.	"One of Them's Yours" (with Ken Mellons)	Camp, Herb McCullough	3:11
10.	"In the Arms of Love"	Chapin Hartford, Bobbye Sonnier, Jo-El Sonnier	3:33
11.	"I Don't Want to Go Out Wondering"	Tony Arata, Emory Gordy, Jr.	2:49
12.	"When He's All You've Got"	Lovett, Steve Siler	3:18

=== Singles ===
Year	Single	Peak positions
Year	Single	US Country
1997	"Look What Love Can Do"	73

=== Music videos ===
Year	Video	Director
1997	"Look What Love Can Do"	Jeffrey Phillips
