= I Got You (Craig Morgan song) =

2005 single by Craig Morgan

Single by Craig Morgan

from the album My Kind of Livin'
- Released: December 5, 2005
- Genre: Country
- Length: 3:53
- Label: Broken Bow
- Songwriters: Craig Morgan; Phil O'Donnell; Tim Owens
- Producers: Craig Morgan; Phil O'Donnell

Craig Morgan singles chronology
"Redneck Yacht Club" (2005)	"I Got You" (2005)	"Little Bit of Life" (2006)

"I Got You" is a song co-written and recorded by American country music artist Craig Morgan. It was released in December 2005 as the third and final single from Morgan's album My Kind of Livin', reaching a peak of number 12 on the U.S. Billboard Hot Country Songs charts and number 92 on the Billboard Hot 100. The song was written by Morgan, Phil O'Donnell and Tim Owens.

== Background and writing ==
Craig states that he wrote "I Got You" while on tour with Keith Urban, hoping to persuade Urban to record the song; however, upon recording the demo version of the song, Morgan decided that the song was a perfect fit for his own style, and that he should record it instead of Urban.

== Music video ==
The music video was directed by Wes Edwards and premiered in early 2006. It features Morgan and his band performing the song in a warehouse, while scenes of love and small-town life are projected on a screen behind him.

== Chart positions ==
Chart (2005–2006)	Peak position
Canada Country (Radio & Records)	25
US Billboard Hot 100	92
US Hot Country Songs (Billboard)	12

=== Year-end charts ===
Chart (2006)	Position
US Country Songs (Billboard)	54
