= That's What I Love About Sunday =

Single by Craig Morgan

from the album My Kind of Livin'
- Released: November 1, 2004
- Genre: Country
- Length: 3:21
- Label: Broken Bow
- Songwriters: Adam Dorsey, Mark Narmore
- Producers: Craig Morgan, Phil O'Donnell

Craig Morgan singles chronology
| "Look at Us" (2004) | "That's What I Love About Sunday" (2004) | "Redneck Yacht Club" (2005) |

"That's What I Love About Sunday" is a song written by Adam Dorsey and Mark Narmore, and recorded by American country music artist Craig Morgan. It was released in November 2004 as the first single from his album My Kind of Livin'. In early 2005, it became his only number one single, spending four weeks atop the Billboard U.S. Hot Country Singles & Tracks chart. In addition, it was the first number one for any artist on the Broken Bow label, and was declared the number-one song of 2005 according to Billboard.

== Background ==
"That's What I Love About Sunday" was the first independently distributed single to top the country chart since 2000. The song was also the first independently distributed single to notch a second week at number one since 1977 when the Kendalls spent four weeks at the top with "Heaven's Just a Sin Away".

Morgan told Billboard, "What the fans say and what we hear is that I make a big deal out of the little things in life. And that is who I am. It's those little things in life that are important to me. Simple things like the smell of fresh cut grass. That what 'Sunday' was about."

Mark Narmore and Adam Dorsey (who happens to be a Baptist minister versus traditional songwriter) wrote the song while meeting at a Chinese restaurant. In an interview with Country Weekly magazine, Narmore said that many of the people mentioned in the song are based on real-life family and friends: "My mother's name is Betty...and the kid that broke the window is based on something that happened when I was about 10 years old." Dorsey adds, "Our best friends at church are the Martins, though they don't have a "mean freckle-faced kid" as mentioned in the song.

== Content ==
A mid-tempo ballad, "That's What I Love About Sunday" is an ode to typical southern Sunday activities, such as attending church services, fishing, playing a back yard game of football, eating a traditional Sunday dinner, and relaxing with family. Morgan re-recorded the song in 2013 for his greatest hits album The Journey (Livin' Hits) and again in 2023 with Rascal Flatts frontman Gary LeVox.

== Music video ==
The music video was directed by Shaun Silva and premiered in November 2004. It shows Morgan performing the song in an outdoor field, and various church-goers setting up for a service at the same field, covered with pews. Several face shots of each of the members are also seen, as well as Morgan also singing while playing guitar while seated in one of the pews of the outdoor church.

== Chart performance ==
| Chart (2004–2005) | Peak position |
|---|---|
| Canada Country (Radio & Records) | 5 |
| US Billboard Hot 100 | 51 |
| US Hot Country Songs (Billboard) | 1 |

=== Year-end charts ===
| Chart (2005) | Position |
|---|---|
| US Country Songs (Billboard) | 1 |

== Certifications ==
| Region | Certification | Certified units/sales |
|---|---|---|
| United States (RIAA) | Gold | 500,000^{‡} |
^{‡} Sales+streaming figures based on certification alone.
