= More Trucks Than Cars =

Single by Craig Morgan

from the album This Ole Boy
- Released: August 27, 2012
- Genre: Country
- Length: 3:32
- Label: Black River
- Songwriter: Craig Morgan; Phil O'Donnell; Craig Wiseman
- Producer: Craig Morgan; Phil O'Donnell

Craig Morgan singles chronology
| "Corn Star" (2012) | "More Trucks Than Cars" (2012) | "Wake Up Lovin' You" (2013) |

"More Trucks Than Cars" is a song co-written and recorded by American country music artist Craig Morgan. It was released in August 2012 as the third single from Morgan's album This Ole Boy. The song was written by Morgan, Phil O'Donnell and Craig Wiseman.

== Critical reception ==
Billy Dukes of Taste of Country gave it four stars out of five, saying that "‘More Trucks Than Cars’ is pure country, with the only criticism being it’s not an original in a category he’s refined."

== Chart performance ==
"More Trucks Than Cars" debuted at number 56 on the Hot Country Songs chart for the week of September 15, 2012.

| Chart (2012–2013) | Peak position |
|---|---|
| US Country Airplay (Billboard) | 27 |
| US Hot Country Songs (Billboard) | 38 |

=== Year-end charts ===
| Chart (2013) | Position |
|---|---|
| US Country Airplay (Billboard) | 96 |
