= Tony Mullins =

American country music songwriter

- Born: Pound, Virginia
- Origin: Nashville, Tennessee
- Genres: Country
- Occupation: Songwriter
- Years active: 1992-present

Tony Mullins (born in Pound, Virginia) is an American country music songwriter.

Mullins moved to Nashville, Tennessee, in 1992, where he worked with Byron Gallimore's publishing company. Among his first cuts was Kenny Chesney's "How Forever Feels", which spent six weeks at No. 1 on the Hot Country Songs charts. Other songs co-written by Mullins include "Nobody Gonna Tell Me What to Do" by Van Zant, "Me and My Gang" by Rascal Flatts, "Something's Gotta Give" by LeAnn Rimes, and "Little Bit of Life" by Craig Morgan. Other artists who have recorded his songs include John Michael Montgomery, Tim McGraw, Clay Walker, and Phil Vassar. In 2012, Mullins was one of four songwriters featured in Great American Country's reality series The Hit Men of Music Row.
