= I Love It (album) =

Studio album by Craig Morgan
- Released: March 11, 2003
- Studio: Legends Studio (Nashville, Tennessee)
- Genre: Country
- Length: 38:26
- Label: Broken Bow Records
- Producer: Craig Morgan; Phil O'Donnell (tracks 1–10); D. Scott Miller (track 11)

Craig Morgan chronology
Craig Morgan (2000)	I Love It (2003)	My Kind of Livin' (2005)

Singles from I Love It
- 1. "God, Family and Country" Released: 2002; 2. "Almost Home" Released: November 4, 2002; 3. "Every Friday Afternoon" Released: July 28, 2003; 4. "Look at Us" Released: March 22, 2004

Professional ratings
Review scores
Source	Rating
Allmusic	4/5 stars
Country Standard Time	(favorable)

I Love It is the second studio album by American country music artist Craig Morgan. It was released on March 11, 2003, by Broken Bow Records. The album contains four singles: "God, Family And Country", "Almost Home", "Every Friday Afternoon", and "Look at Us", all of which entered the Hot Country Songs charts between 2002 and 2004. "Almost Home" was the highest-peaking single of these four, reaching a peak of number 6 on the country charts.

The first single, "God, Family, and Country", was also recorded by the group 4 Runner on their 2003 album Getaway Car. 4 Runner also provide backing vocals on Morgan's rendition. "God, Family, and Country" is also dedicated to songwriter and musician Randy Hardison, who played drums on it.

== Track listing ==
No.	Title	Writer(s)	Length
1.	"I Love It"	Philip Douglas; Ron Harbin; Jimmy Yeary	3:15
2.	"Almost Home"	Craig Morgan; Kerry Kurt Phillips	4:48
3.	"Look at Us"	Morgan; Larry Bastian; Buddy Cannon	2:35
4.	"In the Dream"	Morgan; Don Koch	4:18
5.	"You Never Know"	Morgan; Chris Bain; Phil O'Donnell	3:05
6.	"What You Do to Me"	Steve Dean; Wil Nance	3:21
7.	"Every Friday Afternoon"	Neal Coty; Jimmy Melton	3:53
8.	"Where Has My Hometown Gone"	Morgan; Jeff Carson; O'Donnell	3:43
9.	"Always Be Mine"	Jeremy Campbell; Noah Gordon	3:24
10.	"Money"	Campbell; Gordon; O'Donnell	2:37
11.	"God, Family and Country"	Morgan; Lance McDaniel; Craig Morris	3:26

== Personnel ==
As listed in liner notes.

=== Tracks 1–10 ===
- Craig Morgan – lead vocals, harmony vocals
- Jimmy Nichols – acoustic piano, keyboards, Hammond B3 organ
- Larry Beaird – acoustic guitar, banjo, mandolin
- Jeff King – electric guitars
- Phil O'Donnell – acoustic guitar, harmonica
- Mike Johnson – steel guitar, dobro
- Mike Brignardello – bass
- Paul Leim – drums
- Chris McHugh – drums
- Glen Duncan – fiddle
- Rob Hajacos – fiddle
- Russell Terrell – harmony vocals

=== Track 11 ===
- Craig Morgan – lead vocals
- Larry Paxton – bass
- Randy Hardison – drums
- Jonathan Yudkin – strings
- 4 Runner:

- Jim Chapman – bass vocals
- Lee Hilliard – tenor vocals
- Craig Morris – baritone vocals, acoustic piano
- Michael Lusk – baritone vocals

== Production ==
- Blake Mevis – executive producer
- Craig Morris – producer
- Phil O'Donnell – producer (1–10)
- D. Scott Miller – producer (11)
- Billy Sherrill – tracking engineer (1–10)
- Dan Friszell – recording (11)
- Eric Bickel – assisted engineer (1–10)
- Derek Bason – mixing
- Benny Quinn – mastering at Masterfonics (Nashville, Tennessee)
- Nicole Cochran – production coordinator (1–10)
- Layna Bunt – label copy
- Luellyn Latocki – art direction
- Don Bailey – design
- David Haskell – photography
- Curiosita Entertainment – management

== Chart performance ==
=== Weekly charts ===
Chart (2003)	Peak position
US Billboard 200	124
US Top Country Albums (Billboard)	16
US Heatseekers Albums (Billboard)	1
US Independent Albums (Billboard)	4

=== Year-end charts ===
Chart (2003)	Position
US Top Country Albums (Billboard)	46

=== Singles ===
Year	Single	Peak chart positions	
Year	Single	US Country	US
2002	"God, Family and Country"	49	—
2002	"Almost Home"	6	59
2003	"Every Friday Afternoon"	25	—
2004	"Look at Us"	27	—
"—" denotes releases that did not chart
