= Every Friday Afternoon =

Single by Craig Morgan

from the album I Love It
- Released: August 16, 2003
- Genre: Country
- Length: 3:53
- Label: Broken Bow
- Songwriter(s): Neal Coty, Jimmy Melton
- Producer(s): Craig Morgan, Phil O'Donnell

Craig Morgan singles chronology
"Almost Home" (2002)	"Every Friday Afternoon" (2003)	"Look at Us" (2004)

"Every Friday Afternoon" is a song recorded by American country music artist Craig Morgan. It was released in August 2003 as the third single from the album I Love It. The song reached number 25 on the Billboard Hot Country Singles & Tracks chart. The song was written by Neal Coty and Jimmy Melton.

== Content ==
The song is about a divorcing couple in which the mother has taken custody of their child and moved to Boston, Massachusetts. The father laments that he is unable to visit the child, saying, "It might as well be China or the dark side of the moon / There's no way I can be there every Friday afternoon."

== Critical reception ==
Deborah Evans Price of Billboard reviewed the song favorably, saying that "It's an emotional tragedy that some listeners can relate to. Morgan turns in a beautifully nuanced performance, echoing the heartache and desperation of the situation."

== Chart performance ==
Chart (2003)	Peak position
US Hot Country Songs (Billboard)	25
