= My Kind of Livin' =

2005 album by Craig Morgan

Studio album by Craig Morgan
- Released: March 8, 2005
- Studios: Emerald Sound Studios (Nashville, Tennessee)
- Genre: Country
- Length: 43:10
- Label: Broken Bow Records
- Producers: Craig Morgan Phil O'Donnell

Craig Morgan chronology
I Love It (2003)	My Kind of Livin' (2005)	Little Bit of Life (2006)

Singles from Revolution
- 1. "That's What I Love About Sunday" Released: November 1, 2004; 2. "Redneck Yacht Club" Released: May 16, 2005; 3. "I Got You" Released: December 5, 2005

Professional ratings
Review scores
Source	Rating
Entertainment Weekly	B
Country Standard Time	

My Kind of Livin' is the third studio album by American country music artist Craig Morgan. It was released on March 8, 2005 by Broken Bow Records. His highest-selling album to date, it has been certified Gold in the United States by the Recording Industry Association of America (RIAA). The album produced three chart singles on the Billboard Hot Country Songs charts. The first of these, "That's What I Love About Sunday", became Morgan's only number one hit, and it was the top country music single of 2005 according to Billboard Year-End. "Redneck Yacht Club" peaked at number 2 on the country charts, while "I Got You" (which Morgan had originally intended for Keith Urban to record) was a number 12 hit.

== Reception ==
Chris Willman of Entertainment Weekly gave the album a B rating and wrote, "Morgan's is an idealized Kind of Americana, to be sure. But at least he provides enough writerly detail to avoid setting off smarm alarms." Ralph Novak of People Magazine gave the album three and a half stars calling it "one terrific, old-fashioned country CD."

== Track listing ==
No.	Title	Writer(s)	Length
1.	"That's What I Love About Sunday"	Adam Dorsey; Mark Narmore	3:21
2.	"I Got You"	Craig Morgan; Phil O'Donnell; Tim Owens	3:53
3.	"That's When I'll Believe That You're Gone"	Morgan; Craig Morris	3:28
4.	"I'm Country"	Morgan; Galen Griffin; O'Donnell	3:19
5.	"Lotta Man (In That Little Boy)"	Morgan; O'Donnell; Owens	3:26
6.	"If You Like That"	Morgan; O'Donnell; Kerry Kurt Phillips	3:48
7.	"Ain't the Way I Wanna Go Out"	Morgan; Owens; Jimmy Yeary	3:53
8.	"Redneck Yacht Club"	Thom Shepherd; Steve Williams	3:50
9.	"Rain for the Roses"	Morgan; Shane Minor; O'Donnell	3:40
10.	"Blame Me" (featuring Brad Paisley and John Conlee)	Morgan; O'Donnell; Owens	3:14
11.	"Cowboy and Clown"	Ron Harbin; Kim Tribble	3:33
12.	"In My Neighborhood"	Marty Dodson; Catt Gravitt; Danny Wells	3:37
Total length:			43:02

== Personnel ==
- Craig Morgan – lead vocals, harmony vocals
- Jim "Moose" Brown – acoustic piano, keyboards
- J. T. Corenflos – electric guitars
- Jeff King – electric guitars
- Phil O'Donnell – acoustic guitars, electric guitars, harmony vocals
- Bryan Sutton – acoustic guitars, banjo, mandolin
- Brad Paisley – electric guitar (10), vocals (10)
- Mike Johnson – steel guitar, dobro, pedabro
- Kevin "Swine" Grantt – bass guitar
- Eddie Bayers – drums
- Larry Franklin – fiddle
- Rob Hajacos – fiddle
- Lona Heins – harmony vocals
- Russell Terrell – harmony vocals
- John Conlee – vocals (10)

=== Production ===
- Craig Morgan – producer
- Phil O'Donnell – producer
- Billy Sherrill – tracking engineer
- Derek Bason – mixing
- Allen Ditto – additional tracking, assistant engineer
- Jesse Amend – assistant engineer
- Scott Kidd – assistant engineer
- Benny Quinn – mastering at Masterfonics (Nashville, Tennessee)
- Nicole Cochran – production coordinator
- Summer Harman – art direction
- Latocki Team Creative – design
- Glen Rose – photography
- Tina Crawford – label copy
- Curiosita Entertainment – management

== Chart performance ==
The album sold 22,000 units during its first week.

=== Weekly charts ===
Chart (2005)	Peak position
US Billboard 200	40
US Top Country Albums (Billboard)	7
US Independent Albums (Billboard)	3

=== Year-end charts ===
Chart (2005)	Position
US Top Country Albums (Billboard)	44
Chart (2006)	Position
US Top Country Albums (Billboard)	63

=== Singles ===
Year	Single	Peak chart positions		
Year	Single	US Country	US	US Pop
2004	"That's What I Love About Sunday"	1	51	74
2005	"Redneck Yacht Club"	2	45	93
2005	"I Got You"	12	92	—
"—" denotes releases that did not chart

== Certifications ==
Region	Certification
United States (RIAA)	Gold
