= Little Bit of Life (song) =

Single by Craig Morgan

from the album Little Bit of Life
- Released: August 14, 2006
- Recorded: 2005
- Genre: Country
- Length: 4:12
- Label: Broken Bow
- Songwriters: Danny Wells; Tony Mullins
- Producers: Craig Morgan; Keith Stegall; Phil O'Donnell

Craig Morgan singles chronology
"I Got You" (2005)	"Little Bit of Life" (2006)	"Tough" (2007)

"Little Bit of Life" is a song written by Danny Wells and Tony Mullins, and recorded by American country music artist Craig Morgan. It was released in August 2006 as the lead-off single and title track from his album Little Bit of Life. The song was a Top Ten hit for him on the Billboard country charts in late 2006-early 2007, peaking at number 7.

== Content ==
"Little Bit of Life" is a moderately up-tempo song in which Morgan lists off the various objects and events that make up his life, preceding each with the words "a little bit of". Morgan also recorded unique versions of the song for various country music stations with the line, "A little bit of radio goin' boom, boom, boom" changed to use the radio station's callsign (e.g. "A little WDRM goin' boom, boom, boom").

== Music video ==
The music video was directed by Wes Edwards and premiered in August 2006.

== Chart performance ==
Chart (2006–2007)	Peak position
Canada Country (Billboard)	17
US Billboard Hot 100	75
US Hot Country Songs (Billboard)	7

=== Year-end charts ===
Chart (2007)	Position
US Country Songs (Billboard)	50
