= Almost Home (Craig Morgan song) =

Single by Craig Morgan

from the album I Love It
- Released: November 4, 2002
- Genre: Country
- Length: 4:48
- Label: Broken Bow
- Songwriters: Craig Morgan; Kerry Kurt Phillips
- Producers: Craig Morgan; Phil O'Donnell

Craig Morgan singles chronology
"God, Family and Country" (2002)	"Almost Home" (2002)	"Every Friday Afternoon" (2003)

"Almost Home" is a song co-written and recorded by American country music singer Craig Morgan. It was released in November 2002 as the second single from his album I Love It. The song was Morgan's first top 10 hit on the U.S. country music chart. In addition, the song earned him a "Song of the Year" award from BMI, and a Songwriter's Achievement Award from the Nashville Songwriters' Association International. The song was written by Morgan and Kerry Kurt Phillips. In 2022, he performed this song at the Grand Ole Opry with American rapper and multi-genre singer/songwriter Jelly Roll, before it being released as a single on Morgan's 2023 EP, Enlisted.

== Content ==
The song is a ballad mostly backed by acoustic guitar and fiddle. It tells of the singer's encounter with an old, homeless man who is sleeping behind a trash can on a cold winter day. Presuming that the homeless man may be dead, the singer then rouses him. Upon being awakened, the homeless man says that he is "almost home", and then lists off the activities that he had been doing in his dream. The narrator then offers to drive the old man to a shelter, but the old man refuses.

According to songwriter Kerry Kurt Phillips, the homeless man's explanation that he is "almost home" is intentionally open-ended, and can mean that the man had almost reached home in his dream, or that he is about to die and go to Heaven: "A lot of people ask me if the guy almost died[…] was he dying or dreaming? It's funny how people have different interpretations. That's the neat thing about a song, and I think understatement is the key to a good song...leaving enough room for the listener to draw their own conclusion[…] so I never answer them on that. I guess it's up to the listener."

== Critical reception ==
Chuck Taylor of Billboard gave the song a positive review and wrote, "Always an affecting vocalist, Morgan gives a sensitive, nuanced performance of the poignant lyric. The song is sure to stir emotions and should be a welcome addition to playlists."

== Chart positions ==
"Almost Home" fell from the Billboard Hot Country Songs chart starting with the chart dated for March 8, 2003, after a peak of number 33. This was because the song had decreased in airplay, was below the number 20 position, and was more than 20 weeks old, then the publication's policy for moving a song into recurrent rotation. After its removal, it experienced an unexpected surge in airplay and was restored to that chart at the number 25 position starting with the March 29 publication. After being reinstated on the charts, it achieved a new peak of number six.

Chart (2002–2003)	Peak position
US Billboard Hot 100	59
US Hot Country Songs (Billboard)	6

=== Year-end charts ===
Chart (2003)	Position
US Country Songs (Billboard)	42
