= Tough (Craig Morgan song) =

Single by Craig Morgan

from the album Little Bit of Life
- Released: March 12, 2007
- Genre: Country
- Length: 3:18
- Label: Broken Bow
- Songwriters: Joe Leathers; Monty Criswell
- Producers: Craig Morgan; Keith Stegall; Phil O'Donnell

Craig Morgan singles chronology
"Little Bit of Life" (2006)	"Tough" (2007)	"International Harvester" (2007)

"Tough" is a song written by Joe Leathers and Monty Criswell, and recorded by American country music artist Craig Morgan. It was released in March 2007 as the second single from Morgan's album Little Bit of Life. The song peaked at number 11 on the US Billboard Hot Country Songs chart and at 76 on the Billboard Hot 100.

== Content ==
The song is about a hardworking wife and mother who survives breast cancer, serving as an inspiration to her husband, who says, "There was a time / Back before she was mine / When I thought I was tough."

== Music video ==
The video for "Tough" premiered on June 4, 2007. Directed by Peter Zavadil, it features Morgan singing the song in a dimly lit room by a window, alongside film clips of a woman depicting the events in the song.

== Chart performance ==
Chart (2007)	Peak position
US Billboard Hot 100	76
US Hot Country Songs (Billboard)	11

=== Year-end charts ===
Chart (2007)	Position
US Country Songs (Billboard)	46
