= International Harvester (song) =

Single by Craig Morgan

from the album Little Bit of Life
- Released: September 17, 2007
- Genre: Country
- Length: 3:51
- Label: Broken Bow
- Songwriters: Shane Minor; Danny Myrick; Jeffrey Steele
- Producers: Craig Morgan; Keith Stegall; Phil O'Donnell

Craig Morgan singles chronology
| "Tough" (2007) | "International Harvester" (2007) | "Love Remembers" (2008) |

"International Harvester" is a song written by Jeffrey Steele, Shane Minor, and Danny Myrick, and recorded by American country music singer Craig Morgan. It was released in September 2007 as the third single from his album Little Bit of Life, released in 2006 on Broken Bow Records.

== Content ==
The song is a moderate up-tempo backed largely by fiddle and banjo. The lyric, written in first person, describes a farmer who is driving an International Harvester-branded combine on a highway. Because of the vehicle's slow speed, he is causing a slowdown in traffic on the road and angering drivers, thus leading to the farmer's defense of his own actions.

== Music video ==
On May 17, 2008 the music video for "International Harvester" was filmed in Wichita, Kansas during the Wichita River Festival. It was directed by Dallas Henry. They had scouted various cities and chose Wichita, specifically the main intersection of Broadway and 1st Street, with a focus on the Orpheum Theatre. To produce this video, they hired 10 people locally and 25 actors from a local talent agency to assist production. An International Harvester 1460 combine was used in the production of the music video.

== Critical reception ==
The song received a "thumbs up" review from Engine 145 reviewer Matt C., who called it a "successful 'slice of life' song" because the writers "confine[d] themselves to a manageble theme and paint[ed] a charming picture". He also said that Morgan's Southern twang was a natural fit for the lyrical content, despite expressing uncertainty that listeners would be able to identify with the song's farmer character (as opposed to identifying with those stuck in traffic behind him). Kevin John Coyne, reviewing the song for Country Universe, gave it a B rating. He says Morgan "sings it with enthusiasm and the hook is solid."

== "Trick My Tractor" ==
In association with this song, Morgan ran a contest on his website entitled "Trick My Tractor". This contest, which ran from December 2007 to January 2008, asked for fans to submit pictures of their "tricked out" tractors, lawn mowers, or similar lawn maintenance equipment to his website.

== Charts ==
| Chart (2007–2008) | Peak position |
|---|---|
| Canada Country (Billboard) | 28 |
| US Billboard Hot 100 | 67 |
| US Hot Country Songs (Billboard) | 10 |

=== Year-end charts ===
| Chart (2008) | Position |
|---|---|
| US Country Songs (Billboard) | 58 |

== Certifications ==
| Region | Certification | Certified units/sales |
|---|---|---|
| United States (RIAA) | Gold | 500,000^{‡} |
^{‡} Sales+streaming figures based on certification alone.
