= Redneck Yacht Club =

Single by Craig Morgan

from the album My Kind of Livin'
- Released: May 16, 2005
- Genre: Country
- Length: 3:50
- Label: Broken Bow
- Songwriters: Steve Williams; Thom Shepherd
- Producers: Craig Morgan; Phil O'Donnell

Craig Morgan singles chronology
"That's What I Love About Sunday" (2004)	"Redneck Yacht Club" (2005)	"I Got You" (2005)

"Redneck Yacht Club" is a song written by Thom Shepherd and Steve Williams, and recorded by American country music singer Craig Morgan. It was released in May 2005 as the second single from his album My Kind of Livin'. It peaked at number two on the Billboard Hot Country Songs chart, behind "Better Life" by Keith Urban. The song was certified Platinum by the RIAA for sales of 1,000,000 and was also certified GOLD for digital downloads.

== Background ==
Morgan told USA Today, "I think (redneck) used to be considered a derogatory term, but not anymore. Now it's considered more of a lifestyle than anything."

== Content ==
In the song, Morgan sings about being part of a special yacht club known as the "redneck yacht club".

== Music video ==
The video takes place out on Percy Priest Lake in Davidson County, TN, where Morgan and some of his buddies are having fun, such as soaking up the sun and boat-riding. Some scenes of the video feature Morgan riding on a boat, singing on the deck, and on a flotation device out in the middle of the lake. Country music singer Blake Shelton also makes a cameo appearance along with Aaron Tippin. The party that the group of diehard friends is having symbolizes the fun that they have on the lake, "all summer long". The video was directed by Peter Zavadil.

== Chart performance ==
The song spent 27 weeks on Hot Country Songs.

Chart (2005)	Peak position
Canada Country (Radio & Records)	9
US Billboard Hot 100	45
US Hot Country Songs (Billboard)	2

=== Year-end charts ===
Chart (2005)	Position
US Country Songs (Billboard)	25

== Certifications ==
Region	Certification	Certified units/sales
United States (RIAA)	Platinum	1,000,000^{‡}
^{‡} Sales+streaming figures based on certification alone.
