= Craig Morgan =

American musical artist

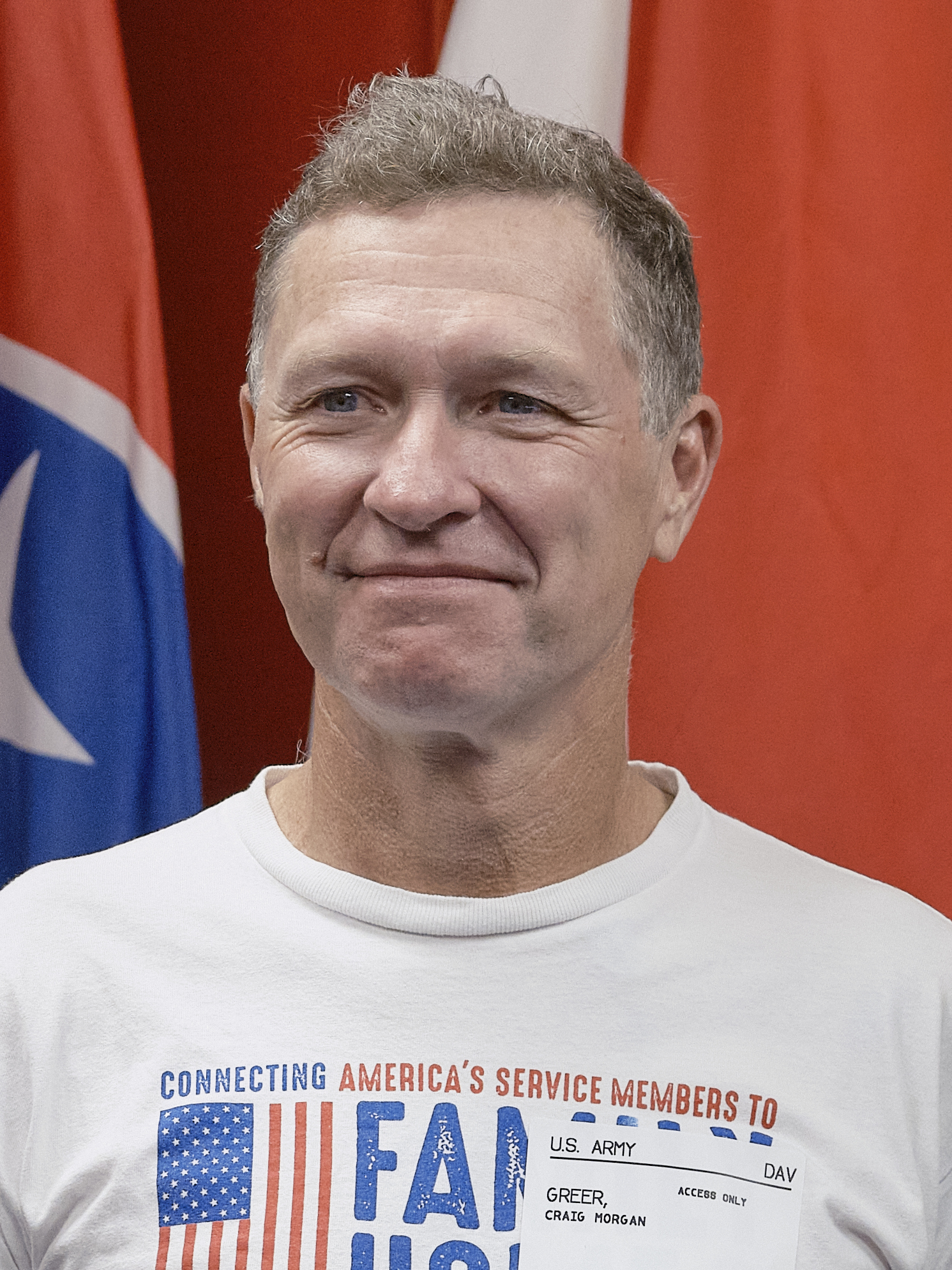
- Morgan in 2023

Background information
- Born: Craig Morgan Greer; July 17, 1964 (age 62); Kingston Springs, Tennessee, U.S.
- Genre: Country
- Occupation: Singer-songwriter
- Instruments: Vocals; acoustic guitar
- Years active: 2000–present
- Labels: Atlantic; Broken Bow; BNA; Black River Entertainment
- Website: craigmorgan.com
- Military career
- Allegiance: United States
- Branch: United States Army
- Service years: 1982-1997; 2023 - present
- Rank: Chief Warrant Officer 2
- Units: 82nd Airborne Division; 101st Airborne Division; 3rd Ranger Battalion; 313th Army Band
- Awards: Meritorious Service Medal (United States) (3); Army Commendation Medal (5); Army Achievement Medal (6); National Defense Service Medal; Armed Forces Expeditionary Medal; Global War On Terrorism Service Medal; Humanitarian Service Medal; Master Parachutist Badge (1 Bronze Combat Jump Star); Air Assault Badge

Craig Morgan Greer (born July 17, 1964) is an American country music singer. Morgan began his musical career in 2000 on Atlantic Records, releasing his self-titled debut album for that label before the closure of its Nashville division in 2000. In 2002, Morgan signed to the independent Broken Bow Records, on which he released three studio albums: 2003's I Love It, 2005's My Kind of Livin', and 2006's Little Bit of Life. These produced several chart hits, including "That's What I Love About Sunday", which spent four weeks at the top of the Billboard country charts while also holding the No. 1 position on that year's Billboard Year-End chart for the country format. A greatest hits package followed in mid-2008 before Morgan signed to BNA Records and released That's Why later that same year. After exiting BNA, Morgan signed with Black River Entertainment and released This Ole Boy in 2012, followed by A Whole Lot More to Me in 2016.

Morgan has charted seventeen times on the Billboard country charts. Besides "That's What I Love About Sunday", six more of his singles have reached that chart's top ten: "Almost Home", "Redneck Yacht Club", "Little Bit of Life", "International Harvester", "Love Remembers", and "Bonfire".

== Biography ==
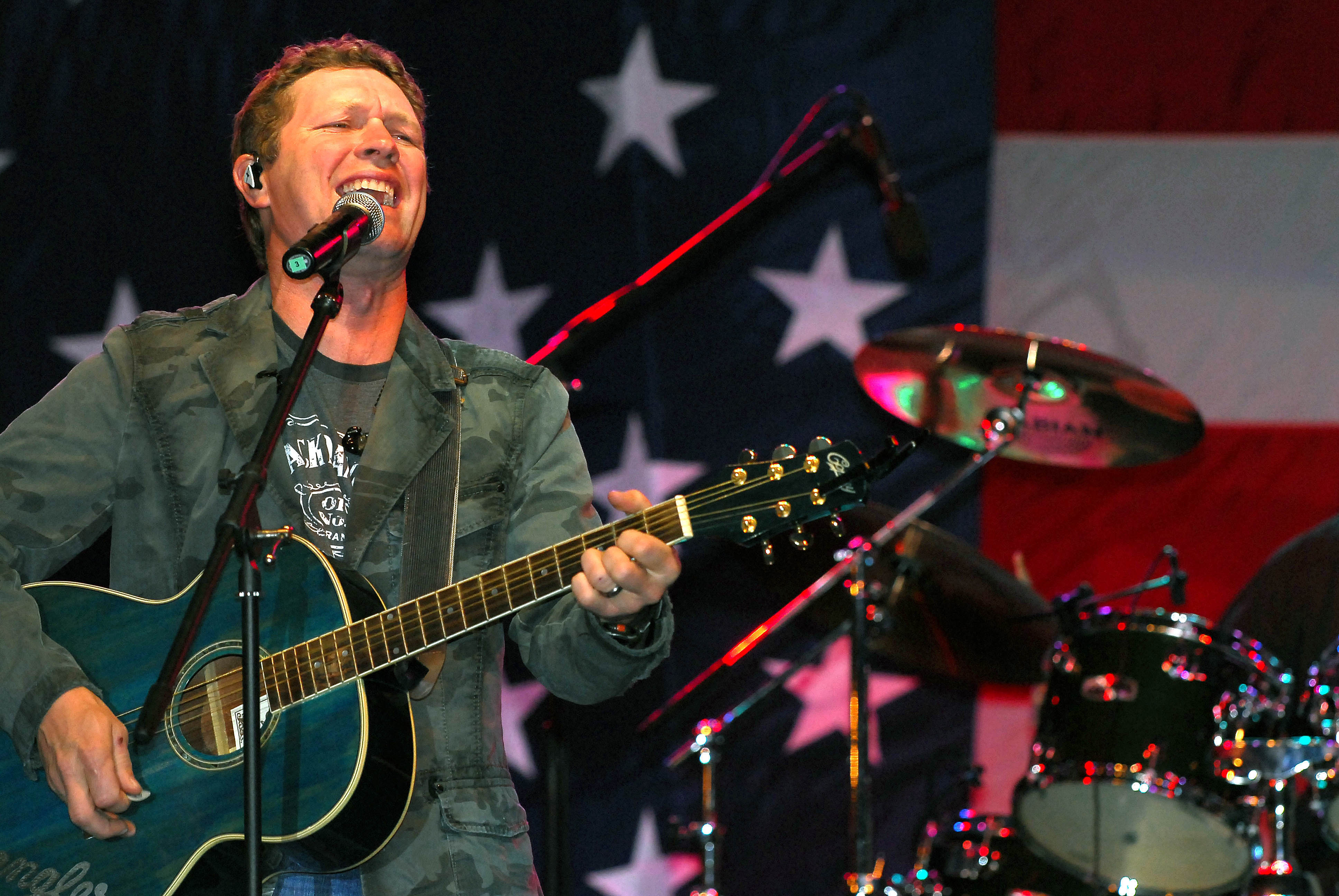
Craig Morgan during a USO performance, March 20, 2007

Craig Morgan Greer was born in Kingston Springs, Tennessee on July 17, 1964. He became an emergency medical technician at age 18. He served on active duty for nine and a half years in the US Army as a member of the 101st and 82nd Airborne Divisions and remained in the Army Reserve for another six and a half years. As a member of the 193rd Infantry Brigades Airborne Battalion he took part in the U.S. Invasion of Panama in 1989 . On July 29, 2023, Morgan re-enlisted in the US Army Reserve while on stage at the Grand Ole Opry. The oath of enlistment was administered by Gen. Andrew Poppas, commander of the United States Army Forces Command while Command Sergeant Major Todd Sims and Senator Marsha Blackburn stood by him on stage. It was in fact Senator Blackburn who played a key role in Morgan's re-enlistment.

== Musical career ==
Upon his return home to Tennessee, he worked various jobs to support his family, including as a construction worker, a security guard and a Wal-Mart employee. He would later land a job in Nashville singing demos for other songwriters and publishing companies. The demos led to releasing his first album with Atlantic Records, the self-titled Craig Morgan in 2000. It produced three singles including "Something to Write Home About", which reached number 39 on the Billboard Hot Country Singles & Tracks (now Hot Country Songs) charts. The album was produced by Buddy Cannon and Norro Wilson, with co-writing credits from Cannon, Bill Anderson and Harley Allen among others. The album's final track, "I Wish I Could See Bakersfield", included a recitation from Merle Haggard. Country Standard Time critic Jon Weisberger gave the album a mixed review, saying that Morgan had a strong singing voice but that most of the songs were "by-the-numbers". Jim Patterson of The Ledger said that lead-off single "Something to Write Home About" was "pedestrian", but that the rest of the album was "an uncommonly assured hard-country effort". Late in the year, Morgan charted a Christmas single entitled "The Kid in Me". Morgan left Atlantic Records in early 2001 when the label closed its Nashville branch, but said that he was not afraid of his musical future because he still had a publishing contract at the time.

=== 2002–2004: I Love It ===
In 2002, Morgan signed with Broken Bow Records. The label released his second album, I Love It, in March 2003. Leading off this album was "God, Family and Country", a song dedicated to former Nashville session drummer Randy Hardison, with backing vocals from the group 4 Runner. It peaked at number 49 on the country charts. Following this song was Morgan's second Top 40 hit, "Almost Home". The song originally fell off the Hot Country Songs charts from a peak position of number 33. However, it experienced an unexpected increase in airplay after falling off the charts, so it was reinstated at the number 25 position three weeks later. After re-entering the charts, the song went on to a new peak position of number six on Hot Country Songs, also reaching number 59 on the Billboard Hot 100. In addition, it won Morgan and co-writer Kerry Kurt Phillips a Song of the Year award from Broadcast Music Incorporated. The album's next two singles, "Every Friday Afternoon" and "Look at Us", both reached the country top 30. By 2004, the album had sold more than 300,000 copies, and its success was cited by Billboard as the beginning of a new wave of commercial success among independently signed country music artists. Rick Cohoon of Allmusic gave I Love It four stars out of five, saying that Morgan's songwriting was "well-crafted" and that his service in the Army justified the patriotic themes of "God, Family and Country". Jeffrey B. Remz of Country Standard Time commended the album for maintaining a neotraditionalist country sound, but said that the ballads were "generic".

=== 2005–2006: My Kind of Livin' ===
Morgan released his third album, My Kind of Livin', in 2004. It included eight songs that he co-wrote, and guest vocals from John Conlee and Brad Paisley on "Blame Me". The first single release, "That's What I Love About Sunday", became his only No. 1 on the country charts, spending four weeks in that position while also reaching No. 51 on the Hot 100. It was also the first No. 1 single for the Broken Bow label, as well as the first independently distributed single to top the country charts in five years, and the first such single to spend multiple weeks at that position since The Kendalls' "Heaven's Just a Sin Away" in 1977. "That's What I Love About Sunday" also placed at No. 1 on that year's Billboard Year-End charts for the country format.

The album's next single, "Redneck Yacht Club", reached No. 2 on the country charts and accounted for his highest peak on the Hot 100, where it went to 45. After it came "I Got You". Morgan wrote this song while on tour with Keith Urban, with the intention of having Urban record it, but decided to keep it for himself after recording a demo of it. My Kind of Livin' was certified gold by the Recording Industry Association of America for shipping 500,000 copies, and "Redneck Yacht Club" received a gold single certification for 500,000 music downloads. Chris Willman of Entertainment Weekly gave the album a B rating, saying in his review that "Morgan's is an idealized Kind of Americana, to be sure. But at least he provides enough writerly detail to avoid setting off smarm alarms." Country Standard Time reviewer Jeffrey B. Remz was generally favorable in his review, saying that Morgan has "a strong voice" and "a number of quality songs", but his review criticized the album's "big and clean" production.

=== 2006–2008: Little Bit of Life and Greatest Hits ===
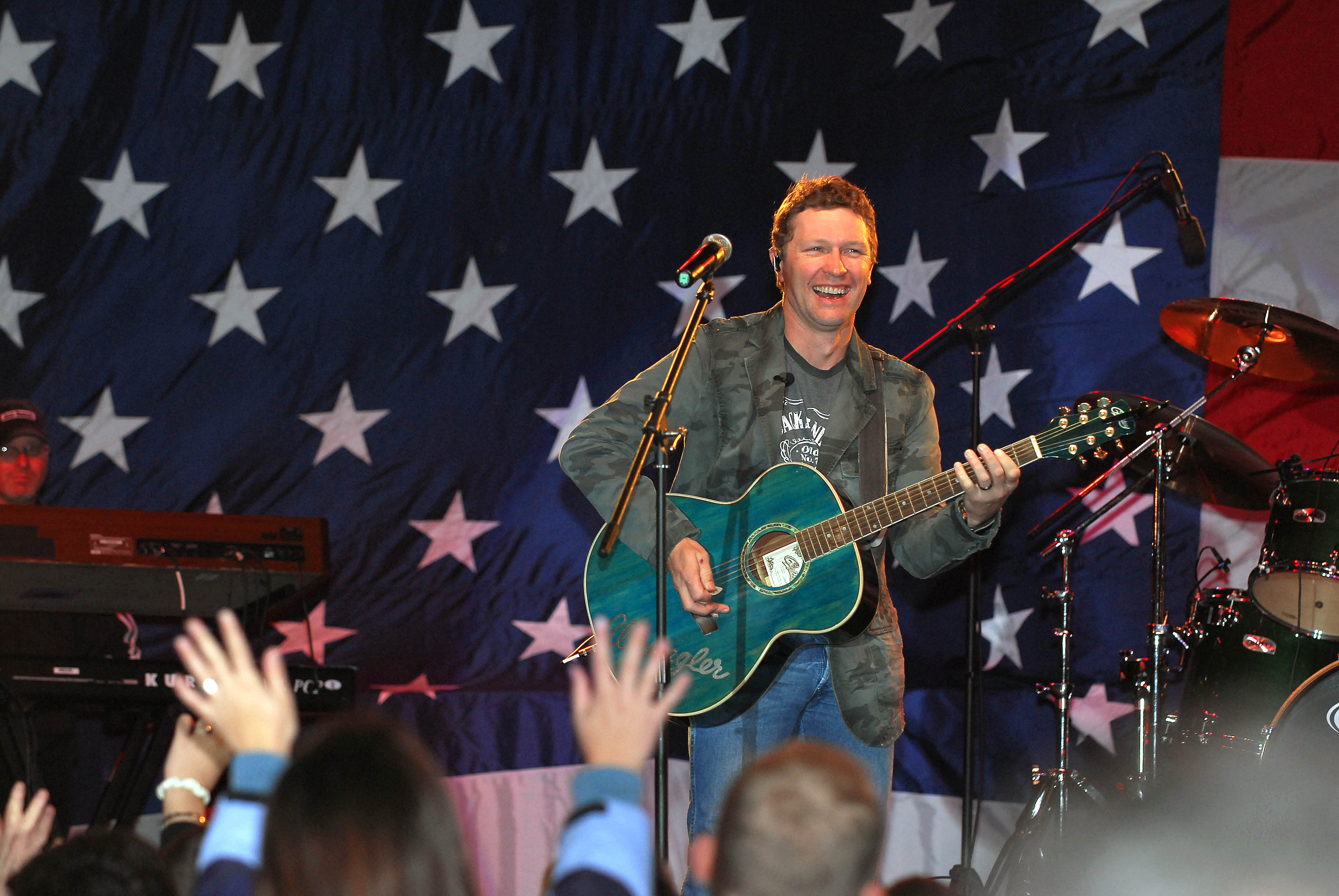
Craig Morgan performing for the USO, March 20, 2007

His third and final album for Broken Bow, Little Bit of Life, was issued in 2006. Morgan and O'Donnell co-produced the album with Keith Stegall, a record producer known for his work with Alan Jackson, and Morgan co-wrote four of its eleven songs. The label shipped more than 200,000 copies of the album in its first week, and made special exclusive releases for retailers such as Target and Walmart. Three singles were issued: the title track, "Tough", and "International Harvester", all of which made the Hot Country Songs charts. Kevin Oliver of Country Standard Time commended the album's neotraditionalist sound and called Morgan "a classic country singer" but said that, beyond the title track and "Tough", "the traditional sound is mostly wasted." Billboard reviewer Deborah Evans Price gave "Tough" a positive review, praising Morgan's "strong, warm voice" and calling the song "yet another gem" from the album. A greatest hits package followed in February 2008, shortly before his departure from Broken Bow.

=== 2008–2010: That's Why ===
On September 18, 2008, Morgan was invited by John Conlee to become a member of the Grand Ole Opry. Conlee formally inducted him as a member during the October 25, 2008, edition of the Opry. Although it had been first announced that Morgan would sign to Big Machine Records' sister label Valory Music Group, he instead signed to BNA Records, a division of Sony BMG Nashville. His first album for the label, That's Why, was released in October 2008. Its first single, "Love Remembers", became his sixth top ten hit by early 2009, but follow-up "God Must Really Love Me" peaked at number 26. BNA re-issued the album in May 2009, replacing two of its tracks with the newly recorded "Bonfire" and "This Ain't Nothin'". The former was released that month as the album's third single, also reaching top ten. In October 2009, the music video for "God Must Really Love Me" won Video of the Year from the Inspirational Country Music Awards. In early 2010, "This Ain't Nothin'" was released as the album's fourth single. It became a top 20 country hit by year's end. Stephen Thomas Erlewine criticized the album for having "uninspired" material, but praised Morgan's "cured country croon". In a more favorable review, Country Standard Time wrote that the songs were "simple but profoundly observant" and compared Morgan's singing voice to Randy Travis. Morgan's last single for BNA, "Still a Little Chicken Left on That Bone", was released in October 2010. The song peaked at number 37 on the country music charts in January 2011. A month later, he left the label.

=== 2011–2015: This Ole Boy, The Journey (Livin' Hits) ===
On April 1, 2011, Morgan signed with Black River Entertainment. Two months later, he sang guest vocals on Colt Ford's single "She Likes to Ride in Trucks". Morgan's first release for Black River was "This Ole Boy", a song co-written by The Peach Pickers (Rhett Akins, Dallas Davidson, and Ben Hayslip) that also appears on Joe Nichols' 2011 album It's All Good. The song is the title track to Morgan's first Black River album, This Ole Boy, which was released on February 28, 2012. The title track was a Top 20 hit for Morgan on the Hot Country Songs chart. After it, "Corn Star" failed to make Top 40, while "More Trucks Than Cars" reached top 30. In July 2013, Morgan released "Wake Up Lovin' You", the first single from his second compilation album The Journey (Livin' Hits). Morgan canceled several shows in May 2014 due to surgical complications for torn tendons in his shoulders.

=== 2015–present: A Whole Lot More to Me ===
The lead single to Morgan's third album for Black River Entertainment, "When I'm Gone", was released to digital retailers on September 18, 2015, and to radio on September 21, 2015. The song peaked at number 48 on the Billboard Country Airplay chart. The album, A Whole Lot More to Me, was released on June 3, 2016.

In 2019, Morgan released a new single called "The Father, My Son, and the Holy Ghost," written about the grief he experiences after his son Jerry's death at the age of 19. Upon hearing the song, Blake Shelton started a campaign on Twitter to help boost the song's chart position. Following this song's release, Morgan was re-signed to Broken Bow for distribution of the single.

== Personal life ==
Morgan is married to wife Karen with whom he has five children: daughters Marisa and Alexandra and sons Kyle, Jerry, and Wyatt. As of 2009, he and his family resided in Dickson, Tennessee. He is a convert to the Catholic faith.

In February 2011, Morgan rescued two young children from a burning house in Dickson, Tennessee, and helped put out the fire using a fire hose.

On April 23, 2011, Morgan became an honorary initiate of the Delta Theta chapter of the Pi Kappa Alpha fraternity.

On July 10, 2016, Morgan's son, Jerry Greer, went missing after falling off an inner tube in Kentucky Lake on the Tennessee River. His body was recovered one day later. He was 19 years old.

== Charitable efforts ==
Morgan frequently performs at military bases both in the U.S. and abroad and on USO tours. He was awarded the 2006 USO Merit Award for his tireless support of US soldiers and their families. Having served in the military, Morgan told American Songwriter Magazine, "Because I have been there, I can appreciate that and have the ability to communicate with them a little differently." Morgan has been active in raising money for and awareness of Veteran Services Organizations (VSOs), including Special Operations Warrior Foundation. and Operation Finally Home [www.operationfinallyhome.org]. Morgan has an annual two-day charity (Craig Morgan Charity Fund) for Billy's Place. The most recent, and fifth one, was held in Dickson, Tennessee, on August 6–7, 2011. The event raised more than $95,000. Morgan came up with the idea for Billy's Place while serving as an assistant Dickson County sheriff's deputy from 1995 to 1996. Through the Craig Morgan Charity Fund, Morgan plans to provide lasting funding to the home.

== Discography ==
Albums

- Craig Morgan (2000)
- I Love It (2003)
- My Kind of Livin' (2005)
- Little Bit of Life (2006)
- Greatest Hits (2008)
- That's Why (2008)
- This Ole Boy (2012)
- The Journey (Livin' Hits) (2013)
- A Whole Lot More to Me (2016)
- God, Family, Country (2020)
- My Country (2026)

Top ten singles (U.S. Hot Country Songs)

- "Almost Home" (No. 6, 2003)
- "That's What I Love About Sunday" (No. 1, 2004–2005)
- "Redneck Yacht Club" (No. 2, 2005)
- "Little Bit of Life" (No. 7, 2006–2007)
- "International Harvester" (No. 10, 2007–2008)
- "Love Remembers" (No. 9, 2008)
- "Bonfire" (No. 4, 2009)
