= List of awards and nominations received by Kenny Chesney =

Kenny Chesney awards and nominations
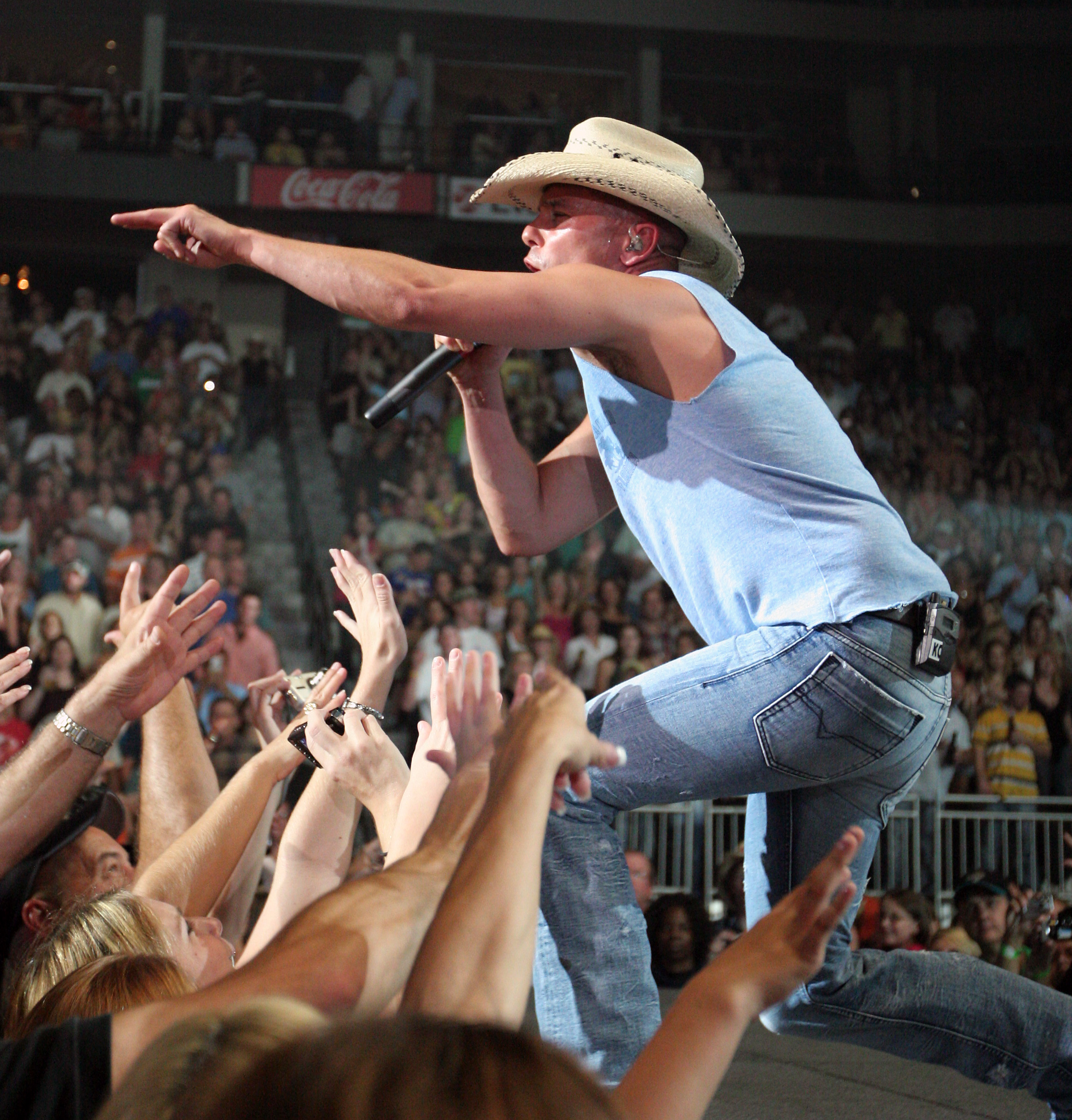
Awards and nominations
Award	Wins	Nominations

Totals (Note: Certain award groups do not simply award one winner. They acknowledge several different recipients, have runners-up, and have third place. Since this is a specific recognition and is different from losing an award, runner-up mentions are considered wins in this award tally. For simplification and to avoid errors, each award in this list has been presumed to have had a prior nomination.)
- Wins: 49
- Nominations: 158

Kenny Chesney is an American country singer. With over 30 million albums sold worldwide. He is one of the most popular touring acts in United States country music and has received many awards and nominations for his contributions to the music industry.

== Academy of Country Music Awards ==
The Academy of Country Music Awards, also known as the ACM Awards, were first held in 1966, and honor the industry's accomplishments during the previous year. It was the first country music awards program held by a major organization.

Year	Nominee / work	Award	Result
1998	Kenny Chesney	Top New Male Vocalist	Won
2001	Kenny Chesney	Top Male Vocalist	Nominated
2002	Kenny Chesney	Top Male Vocalist	Nominated
2003	Kenny Chesney	Top Entertainer of the Year	Nominated
2003	Kenny Chesney	Top Male Vocalist	Won
2003	No Shoes, No Shirt, No Problems	Album of the Year	Nominated
2003	“The Good Stuff”	Single Record of the Year	Won
2004	Kenny Chesney	Entertainer of the Year	Nominated
2004	Kenny Chesney	Top Male Vocalist of the Year	Nominated
2005	Kenny Chesney	Entertainer of the Year	Won
2005	Kenny Chesney	Top Male Vocalist of the Year	Nominated
2005	"When The Sun Goes Down"	Vocal Event of the Year	Nominated
2005	When The Sun Goes Down	Album of the Year	Nominated
2006	Kenny Chesney	Entertainer of the Year	Won
2006	Kenny Chesney	Top Male Vocalist	Nominated
2006	Kenny Chesney	Triple Crown Winner	Won
2007	Kenny Chesney	Entertainer of the Year	Won
2007	Kenny Chesney	Top Male Vocalist	Nominated
2008	Kenny Chesney	Entertainer of the Year	Won
2008	Kenny Chesney	Top Male Vocalist	Nominated
2008	Just Who I Am: Poets & Pirates	Album of the Year	Nominated
2008	“Don’t Blink”	Single Record of the Year	Nominated
2008	“Don’t Blink”	Video of the Year	Nominated
2008	“Find Out Who Your Friends Are”	Vocal Event of the Year (shared with Tracy Lawrence and Tim McGraw)	Won
2009	Kenny Chesney	Entertainer of the Year	Nominated
2009	Kenny Chesney	Top Male Vocalist	Nominated
2009	“Down The Road”	Vocal Event of the Year	Nominated
2010	Kenny Chesney	Entertainer of the Year	Nominated
2010	Kenny Chesney	Top Male Vocalist	Nominated
2010	"I'm Alive"	Vocal Event of the Year	Nominated
2011	Hemingway’s Whiskey	Album of the Year	Nominated
2011	“The Boys Of Fall”	Video of the year	Nominated
2011	“The Boys Of Fall”	Single of the Year	Nominated
2011	Kenny Chesney	Crystal Milestone Award	Won
2012	Kenny Chesney	Entertainer of the Year	Nominated
2012	Kenny Chesney	Male Artist of the Year	Nominated
2012	Hemingway’s Whiskey	Album of the Year	Nominated
2012	“You and Tequila"	Single of the Year	Nominated
2012	“You and Tequila"	Vocal Event of the Year	Nominated
2013	“Feel Like A Rock Star”	Vocal Event of the Year	Nominated
2015	“American Kids"	Single of the Year	Nominated
2015	“American Kids"	Video of the Year	Won
2015	“American Kids"	Song of the Year	Nominated
2015	Kenny Chesney	50th Anniversary Milestone Award	Won
2016	“Wild Child"	Vocal Event of the Year	Nominated
2019	Kenny Chesney	Entertainer of the Year	Nominated
2019	“Everything's Gonna Be Alright"	Music Event of the Year	Nominated
2022	“Half of My Hometown"	Music Event of the Year	Nominated

== American Music Awards ==
The American Music Awards (AMAs) is an annual American music awards show held since 1974. Nominees are selected on commercial performance such as sales and airplay. Winners are determined by a poll of the public and fans who vote through the AMAs website.

Year	Nominee / work	Award	Result
2003	Kenny Chesney	Favorite Country Male Artist	Nominated
2004	Kenny Chesney	Artist of the Year	Won
2004	Kenny Chesney	Favorite Country Male Artist	Nominated
2004	When the Sun Goes Down	Favorite Country Album	Nominated
2005	Kenny Chesney	Favorite Country Male Artist	Nominated
2006	Kenny Chesney	Favorite Country Male Artist	Nominated
2008	Kenny Chesney	Favorite Country Male Artist	Nominated

== American Country Awards ==
The American Country Awards was a country music awards show, entirely voted on by fans. Created by the Fox Network, the awards honored country music artists in music, video, and touring categories. It lasted four years. Underwood won twelve awards, more than any other artist.

Year	Nominee / work	Award	Result
2010	Kenny Chesney	Make Artist of the Year	Nominated
2011	Kenny Chesney	Artist of the Year	Nominated
2011	"You and Tequila"	Single by a Vocal Collaboration	Nominated
2011	Kenny Chesney	Touring Artist of the Year	Nominated
2012	Kenny Chesney	Male Artist of the Year	Nominated
2013	Kenny Chesney	Male Artist of the Year	Nominated

== American Country Countdown Awards ==
The American Country Countdown Awards was an annual country music awards show that honors artists based on their album sales, touring data and the amount of their radio airplay. It is named after the long-running radio show American Country Countdown.

Year	Nominee / work	Award	Result
2014	Kenny Chesney	Groundbreaker Award	Won
2016	Kenny Chesney	Touring Artist of the Year	Nominated

== Billboard Music Awards ==
The Billboard Music Awards are honors given out annually by Billboard, a publication covering the music business and a music popularity chart. The Billboard Music Awards have been held annually since 1990.

Year	Nominee / work	Award	Result
2001	Kenny Chesney	Top Country Artist	Nominated
2001	Kenny Chesney	Top Male Country Artist	Nominated
2005	Kenny Chesney	Top Country Artist	Nominated
2005	Kenny Chesney	Top Male Country Artist	Nominated
2006	Kenny Chesney	Country Artist of the Year	Won
2006	Kenny Chesney	Male Country Artist of the Year	Won
2006	Kenny Chesney	Country Songs Artist of the Year	Won
2006	“Summertime”	Top Country Song	Nominated
2006	The Road and the Radio	Top Country Album	Nominated
2011	Kenny Chesney	Top Country Artist	Nominated
2017	“Setting the World on Fire”	Top Country Song	Nominated
2017	“Setting the World on Fire”	Top Country Collaboration (shared with Pink!)	Won
2017	Kenny Chesney	Top Country tour	Won
2019	Kenny Chesney	Top Country tour	Won
2024	Kenny Chesney	Top Country tour	Nominated

== Billboard Live Music Awards ==
The Billboard Live Music Awards were an annual meeting sponsored by Billboard that honored the top international live entertainment industry artists and professionals. Established in 2004.

Year	Nominee / work	Award	Result
2005	Kenny Chesney	Top Draw	Nominated
2005	A Place in the Sun	Top Tour	Nominated
2005	Somewhere in the Sun	Top Package	Won
2006	The Road and the Radio Tour	Top Package	Won
2007	Flip Flop Summer Tour	Top Package	Won
2007	Flip Flop Summer Tour	Top Draw	Nominated
2008	Poets and Pirates Tour	Fans Choice	Won
2008	Poets and Pirates Tour	Top Package	Won
2009	Sun City Carnival Tour	Top Package	Won
2012	Brothers of the Sun Tour	Top Package	Won
2012	Kenny Chesney	Road Warrior	Won
2015	The Big Revival Tour	Top Package	Won

== Country Music Association Awards ==
The Country Music Association Awards, were established in 1967 to recognize outstanding achievement in the country music industry.

Year	Nominee / work	Award	Result
1999	Kenny Chesney	Horizon Award	Nominated
2002	Kenny Chesney	Entertainer of the Year	Nominated
2002	Kenny Chesney	Male Vocalist of the Year	Nominated
2002	No Shoes, No Shirt, No Problems	Album of the Year	Nominated
2003	Kenny Chesney	Entertainer of the Year	Nominated
2003	Kenny Chesney	Male Vocalist of the Year	Nominated
2004	Kenny Chesney	Entertainer of the Year	Won
2004	Kenny Chesney	Male Vocalist of the Year	Nominated
2004	When The Sun Goes Down	Album of the Year	Won
2004	“Hey Good Lookin'”	Music Event of the Year	Nominated
2004	“When the Sun Goes Down”	Music Event of the Year	Nominated
2005	Kenny Chesney	Entertainer of the Year	Nominated
2005	Kenny Chesney	Male Vocalist of the Year	Nominated
2006	Kenny Chesney	Entertainer of the Year	Won
2006	Kenny Chesney	Male Vocalist of the Year	Nominated
2006	The Road And The Radio	Album of the Year	Nominated
2006	“Summertime”	Single of the Year	Nominated
2007	Kenny Chesney	Entertainer of the Year	Won
2007	Kenny Chesney	Male Vocalist of the Year	Nominated
2007	“Find Out Who Your Friends Are”	Music Event of the Year (shared with multiple artists)	Won
2007	"You Save Me"	Music Video of the Year	Nominated
2008	Kenny Chesney	Entertainer of the Year	Won
2008	Kenny Chesney	Male Vocalist of the Year	Nominated
2008	Just Who I Am: Poets & Pirates	Album of the Year	Nominated
2008	"Don't Blink"	Single of the Year	Nominated
2008	"Don't Blink"	Music Video of the Year	Nominated
2008	“Every Other Weekend”	Music Event of the Year	Nominated
2008	"Shiftwork"	Music Event of the Year	Nominated
2009	Kenny Chesney	Entertainer of the Year	Nominated
2009	Kenny Chesney	Male Vocalist of the Year	Nominated
2009	"Down The Road"	Music Event of the Year	Nominated
2010	"I'm Alive"	Music Event of the Year	Nominated
2011	Kenny Chesney	Male Vocalist of the Year	Nominated
2011	"You and Tequila"	Music Event of the Year	Nominated
2011	"You and Tequila"	Music Video of the Year	Won
2012	Kenny Chesney	Entertainer of the Year	Nominated
2012	"Come Over"	Music video of the Year	Nominated
2012	"Feel Like a Rock Star"	Music Event of the Year (shared with Tim McGraw)	Won
2015	Kenny Chesney	Entertainer of the Year	Nominated
2015	The Big Revival	Album of the Year	Nominated
2015	"American Kids"	Single of the Year	Nominated
2016	Kenny Chesney	CMA Pinnacle Award	Won
2017	"Setting the World on Fire"	Musical Event of the Year	Nominated
2018	Kenny Chesney	Entertainer of the Year	Nominated
2018	"Everything's Gonna Be Alright"	Musical Event of the Year (shared with David Lee Roth)	Won
2021	"Half of My Hometown"	Musical Event of the Year (shared with Kelsea Ballerini)	Won
2021	"Half of My Hometown"	Music Video of the Year	Won
2022	"Half of My Hometown"	Single of the Year	Nominated
2025	"You Had To Be There"	Musical Event of the Year	Nominated

== Country Music Hall of Fame ==
The Country Music Hall of Fame, is the highest honor the genre can bestow. An invitation can be extended to performers, songwriters, broadcasters, musicians, and executives in recognition of their contributions to the development of country music. The hall of fame honor was created in 1961 by the Country Music Association.

Year	Nominee / work	Award	Result
2025	Kenny Chesney	The Country Music Hall of Fame	Inducted

== CMT Music Awards ==
The CMT Music Awards is a fan-voted awards show for countrymusic videos and television performances. The ceremony launched in 1967 as Music City News Awards; it is the oldest award show currently airing under Paramount Global.

Year	Nominee / work	Award	Result
2002	"Young"	Video of the Year	Won
2002	"Young"	Male Video of the Year	Won
2004	"There Goes My Life"	Male Video of the Year	Won
2005	"I Go Back"	Male Video of the Year	Won
2006	"Who You'd Be Today"	Male Video of the Year	Won
2007	"You Save Me"	Male Video of the Year	Won

== Grammy Awards ==
The annual Grammy Awards are presented by the National Academy of Recording Arts and Sciences, and are and are considered one of the four major annual American entertainment awards.

Year	Nominee / work	Award	Result
2005	“Hey, Good Lookin”	Best Country Collaboration With Vocals (shared with multiple artists)	Nominated
2009	"Shiftwork"	Best Country Collaboration With Vocals (shared with George Strait)	Nominated
2010	"Down the Road"	Best Country Collaboration With Vocals (shared with Mac McAnally)	Nominated
2012	“You and Tequila”	Best Country Duo/Group Performance (shared with Grace Potter)	Nominated
2017	“Setting the World on Fire”	Best Country Duo/Group Performance (shared with Pink!)	Nominated
2018	Cosmic Hallelujah	Best Country Album	Nominated

== iHeart Radio Music Awards ==
The IHeart Radio Music Awards were established in 2014 to celebrate music heard throughout the year across iHeartMedia radio stations nationwide and on iHeartRadio and iHeartMedia's digital music platform.

Year	Nominee / work	Award	Result
2023	“Half of My Hometown"	Best Collaboration (shared with Kelsea Ballerini)	Nominated
2023	“Half of My Hometown"	Best Country Song	Nominated

== Radio Music Awards ==
The Radio Music Awards were an annual U.S. award that honored the year's most successful songs. Originally a televised show recognizing mainstream radio, nominations were based on the amount of airplay recording artists received on radio stations in various formats using chart information compiled by Mediabase.

Year	Nominee / work	Award	Result
1999	Kenny Chesney	Country Artist of the Year	Nominated
1999	“How Forever Feels”	Best Car Jam	Nominated
2003	Kenny Chesney	Artist of the Year: Country Radio	Nominated
2005	“When the Sun Goes Down”	Viewers Choice for Best Driving Song	Won
