= Goin' Coastal Tour =

2011 concert tour by Kenny Chesney and the Zac Brown Band

- Tour by Kenny Chesney and the Zac Brown Band
- Promotional poster for the tour
- Location: North America
- Associated album: Hemingway's Whiskey; You Get What You Give
- Start date: March 17, 2011
- End date: August 27, 2011
- Legs: 1
- No. of shows: 59
- Box office: $84,576,917
Kenny Chesney tour chronology
2010 With a Two Tour (2010)	Goin' Coastal Tour (2011)	Brothers of the Sun Tour (2012)
Zac Brown Band tour chronology
Goin' Coastal Tour (2011)	Uncaged Tour (2012–13)

The Goin' Coastal Tour was a co-headlining concert tour by American country music arts Kenny Chesney and the Zac Brown Band. It was in support of Chesney's thirteenth studio album Hemingway's Whiskey (2010) and the Zac Brown Band's second album You Get What You Give (2010). It was announced in November 2010, with nine stadium shows being announced first. An additional forty-one were announced two months later. Chesney co-headlined the stadium shows with Zac Brown Band. Billy Currington and Uncle Kracker served as opening acts. This was the Chesney's last tour before taking a two-year hiatus.

== Background ==
Chesney told USA Today, "We are excited to feel the passion and the energy that the fans give us again", "There's a realsense of anticipation that our whole organization has about getting back on the road and playing some of our favorite stadiums and some new ones too, like Arrowhead and Lambeau Field where they haven't had a concert in over 20 years. We can't wait!"

== Opening acts ==
- Zac Brown Band (11 shows)
- Billy Currington
- Uncle Kracker

== Setlist ==
1. "Live a Little"
2. "Reality"
3. ”Til It’s Gone”
4. "Live Those Songs"
5. "Summertime"
6. "Beer in Mexico"
7. ”Keg in the Closet”
8. ”Out Last Night”
9. "Big Star"
10. "No Shoes, No Shirt, No Problem"
11. ”I Go Back”
12. "Anything but Mine"
13. ”Coastal
14. ”The Woman with You”
15. "The Life"
16. "Me and You"
17. "Three Little Birds" (Bob Marley and the Wailers cover)
18. ”There Goes My Life”
19. "Living in Fast Forward"
20. "Young"
21. "Somewhere with You"
22. ”American Kids”
23. "Don't Happen Twice"
24. "Everybody Wants to Go to Heaven"
25. "The Good Stuff"
26. "Never Wanted Nothing More"
27. "When the Sun Goes Down" (with Uncle Kracker)
28. "You Never Even Call Me By My Name" (David Allan Coe cover) (with Uncle Kracker)
29. "How Forever Feels"
30. "She Thinks My Tractor's Sexy"

Encore

31. "The Boys of Fall"

== Tour dates ==
Date	City	Country	Venue
North America
March 17, 2011	West Palm Beach	United States	Cruzan Amphitheatre
March 19, 2011	Tampa	United States	Raymond James Stadium
March 24, 2011	Des Moines	United States	Wells Fargo Arena
March 25, 2011	Saint Paul	United States	Xcel Energy Center
March 26, 2011	Omaha	United States	Qwest Center
April 1, 2011	North Little Rock	United States	Verizon Arena
April 2, 2011	Tulsa	United States	BOK Center
April 3, 2011 ^{[A]}	Houston	United States	Discovery Green
April 7, 2011	Portland	United States	Cumberland County Civic Center
April 8, 2011	Uncasville	United States	Mohegan Sun Arena
April 9, 2011	Uncasville	United States	Mohegan Sun Arena
April 13, 2011	Wichita	United States	Intrust Bank Arena
April 16, 2011	Arlington	United States	Cowboys Stadium
April 29, 2011	Mountain View	United States	Shoreline Amphitheatre
April 30, 2011 ^{[B]}	Indio	United States	Empire Polo Club
May 1, 2011	Glendale	United States	Jobing.com Arena
May 5, 2011	Moline	United States	iWireless Center
May 6, 2011	Fort Wayne	United States	Allen County War Memorial Coliseum
May 7, 2011	Grand Rapids	United States	Van Andel Arena
May 12, 2011	Jacksonville	United States	Jacksonville Veterans Memorial Arena
May 13, 2011	Greenville	United States	Bi-Lo Center
May 14, 2011	Lexington	United States	Rupp Arena
May 19, 2011	Columbia	United States	Colonial Life Arena
May 20, 2011	Atlanta	United States	Aaron's Amphitheatre
May 21, 2011	Orange Beach	United States	Amphitheater at the Wharf
May 25, 2011	Tuscaloosa	United States	Tuscaloosa Amphitheater
May 26, 2011	Southaven	United States	Snowden Grove Amphitheater
May 29, 2011	Baton Rouge	United States	Tiger Stadium
June 2, 2011	Charlotte	United States	Verizon Wireless Amphitheatre
June 4, 2011	Landover	United States	FedExField
June 9, 2011	Bridgeview	United States	Toyota Park
June 11, 2011	Green Bay	United States	Lambeau Field
June 18, 2011	Philadelphia	United States	Lincoln Financial Field
June 23, 2011	Cuyahoga Falls	United States	Blossom Music Center
June 24, 2011	Noblesville	United States	Verizon Wireless Amphitheatre
June 26, 2011	Columbus	United States	Crew Stadium
June 30, 2011	Cincinnati	United States	Riverbend Music Center
July 2, 2011	Pittsburgh	United States	Heinz Field
July 6, 2011	Morrison	United States	Red Rocks Amphitheatre
July 7, 2011	Morrison	United States	Red Rocks Amphitheatre
July 8, 2011	Morrison	United States	Red Rocks Amphitheatre
July 9, 2011	West Valley City	United States	USANA Amphitheatre
July 13, 2011	Winnipeg	Canada	MTS Centre
July 16, 2011	Edmonton	Canada	Rexall Place
July 17, 2011 ^{[C]}	Calgary	Canada	Scotiabank Saddledome
July 20, 2011	Vancouver	Canada	Rogers Arena
July 22, 2011	Tacoma	United States	Tacoma Dome
July 23, 2011	Portland	United States	Rose Garden Arena
July 28, 2011	Maryland Heights	United States	Verizon Wireless Amphitheater
July 30, 2011	Kansas City	United States	Arrowhead Stadium
August 4, 2011	Virginia Beach	United States	Verizon Wireless Amphitheatre
August 5, 2011	Raleigh	United States	Time Warner Cable Music Pavilion
August 7, 2011	Evansville	United States	Roberts Municipal Stadium
August 13, 2011	East Rutherford	United States	New Meadowlands Stadium
August 18, 2011	Toronto	Canada	Rogers Centre
August 20, 2011	Detroit	United States	Ford Field
August 24, 2011	Hopewell	United States	CMAC
August 26, 2011	Foxborough	United States	Gillette Stadium
August 27, 2011	Foxborough	United States	Gillette Stadium
August 28, 2011	Foxborough	United States	Gillette Stadium
September 6, 2011	Bridgeview	United States	Toyota Stadium

Notes
^{A} This was during the 2011 Men's Division I Final Four.
^{B} This concert was a part of the Stagecoach Festival
^{C} This concert was a part of the Calgary Stampede

== Accolades ==
The tour was ranked sixth for the Top 25 Tours of 2011. It went on to gross $84,576,917, a total attendance of 1,160,132, and had 37 sold-out shows.
