= No Shoes Nation Tour =

2013 concert tour by Kenny Chesney

- Tour by Kenny Chesney with Eric Church
- Promotional poster for the tour
- Location: North America
- Associated album: Life on a Rock
- Start date: March 16, 2013
- End date: August 24, 2013
- Legs: 1
- No. of shows: 45
- Box office: US$90 million
Kenny Chesney tour chronology
Brothers of the Sun Tour (2012)	No Shoes Nation Tour (2013)	The Big Revival Tour (2015)
Eric Church tour chronology
Locked and Loaded Tour (2011)	No Shoes Nation Tour (2013)	Locked and Reloaded Tour (2013)

The No Shoes Nation Tour was the thirteenth headlining concert tour by American country music singer Kenny Chesney, in support of his fifteenth studio album Life on a Rock (2013). It began on March 16, 2013 at Raymond James Stadium in Tampa, Florida and ended on August 24 at Gillette Stadium in Foxborough, Massachusetts.

== Setlist ==
1. "Feel Like a Rock Star"
2. "Reality"
3. ”Til It’s Gone”
4. ”Here and Now”
5. "Beer in Mexico"
6. "Keg In The Closet"
7. ”We Do”
8. "Pirate Flag"
9. "Summertime"
10. "No Shoes, No Shirt, No Problems"
11. "Welcome To The Fishbowl"
12. "Somewhere with You"
13. "I Go Back"
14. ”Get Along”
15. "On The Coast of Somewhere Beautiful"
16. "You and Tequila"
17. ”Happy Does”
18. "Living in Fast Forward"
19. "Young"
20. ”American Kids”
21. "How Forever Feels"
22. "Everybody Wants to Go to Heaven"
23. "Big Star"
24. "Come Over"
25. "There Goes My Life"
26. "Never Wanted Nothing More"
27. ”Don't Blink”
28. "Anything but Mine"
29. "Old Blue Chair"
30. ”Be As You Are
31. ”Guitars and Tiki Bars
32. "When the Sun Goes Down"
33. ”Tip of My Tongue”
34. "Out Last Night"
35. "The Boys of Fall"
  Encore
36. ”Don't Happen Twice”
37. "She Thinks My Tractor's Sexy"

== Tour dates ==
Date	City	Country	Venue	Co-headliner	Opening acts
North America
March 16, 2013	Tampa	United States	Raymond James Stadium	Eric Church	Eli Young Band; Kacey Musgraves
March 21, 2013	Albany	United States	Times Union Center	—N/a	Eli Young Band; Kacey Musgraves
March 22, 2013	Uncasville	United States	Mohegan Sun Arena	—N/a	Eli Young Band; Kacey Musgraves
March 23, 2013	Uncasville	United States	Mohegan Sun Arena	—N/a	Eli Young Band; Kacey Musgraves
April 4, 2013	Lafayette	United States	Cajundome	—N/a	Eli Young Band; Kacey Musgraves
April 11, 2013	Orange Beach	United States	The Amphitheater At The Wharf	—N/a	Eli Young Band; Kacey Musgraves
April 13, 2013	Fort Lauderdale	United States	Rock The Ocean's Tortuga Music Festival	—N/a	Eli Young Band; Kacey Musgraves
April 19, 2013	Las Vegas	United States	The Joint	—N/a	Eli Young Band; Kacey Musgraves
April 20, 2013	Las Vegas	United States	The Joint	—N/a	Eli Young Band; Kacey Musgraves
April 25, 2013	Grand Rapids	United States	Van Andel Arena	—N/a	Eli Young Band; Kacey Musgraves
April 26, 2013	Peoria	United States	Peoria Civic Center	—N/a	Eli Young Band; Kacey Musgraves
April 27, 2013	Des Moines	United States	Wells Fargo Arena	—N/a	Eli Young Band; Kacey Musgraves
May 4, 2013	Columbia	United States	Williams-Brice Stadium	Zac Brown Band	Eli Young Band; Kacey Musgraves
May 11, 2013	Arlington	United States	AT&T Stadium	Eric Church	Eli Young Band; Kacey Musgraves
May 16, 2013	Fort Wayne	United States	Allen County War Memorial Coliseum	—N/a	Eli Young Band; Kacey Musgraves
May 18, 2013	Milwaukee	United States	Miller Park	Eric Church	Eli Young Band; Kacey Musgraves
May 23, 2013	Raleigh	United States	Time Warner Cable Music Pavilion	—N/a	Eli Young Band; Kacey Musgraves
May 25, 2013	Landover	United States	FedExField	Eric Church	Eli Young Band; Kacey Musgraves
May 30, 2013	Boise	United States	Taco Bell Arena	—N/a	Eli Young Band; Kacey Musgraves
June 1, 2013	Seattle	United States	CenturyLink Field	Eric Church	Eli Young Band; Kacey Musgraves
June 6, 2013	Virginia Beach	United States	Farm Bureau Live at Virginia Beach	—N/a	Eli Young Band; Kacey Musgraves
June 8, 2013	Philadelphia	United States	Lincoln Financial Field	Eric Church	Eli Young Band; Kacey Musgraves
June 13, 2013	Noblesville	United States	Klipsch Music Center	—N/a	Eli Young Band; Kacey Musgraves
June 15, 2013	Kansas City	United States	Arrowhead Stadium	Eric Church	Eli Young Band; Kacey Musgraves
June 20, 2013	Cuyahoga Falls	United States	Blossom Music Center	—N/a	Eli Young Band; Kacey Musgraves
June 22, 2013	Pittsburgh	United States	Heinz Field	Eric Church	Eli Young Band; Kacey Musgraves
June 27, 2013	Maryland Heights	United States	Verizon Wireless Amphitheater	—N/a	Eli Young Band; Kacey Musgraves
June 28, 2013	Cincinnati	United States	Riverbend Music Center	—N/a	Eli Young Band; Kacey Musgraves
June 29, 2013	Columbus	United States	Crew Stadium	Eric Church	Eli Young Band; Kacey Musgraves
July 6, 2013	Cavendish	Canada	Cavendish Beach Music Festival	—N/a	Eli Young Band; Kacey Musgraves
July 12, 2013	Minneapolis	United States	Target Field	Zac Brown Band	Eli Young Band; Kacey Musgraves
July 14, 2013	Craven	Canada	Craven Country Jamboree	—N/a	Eli Young Band; Kacey Musgraves
July 18, 2013	West Valley City	United States	USANA Amphitheatre	—N/a	Eli Young Band; Kacey Musgraves
July 20, 2013	Denver	United States	Sports Authority Field at Mile High	Eric Church	Eli Young Band; Kacey Musgraves
July 24, 2013	Fresno	United States	Save Mart Center	—N/a	Eli Young Band; Kacey Musgraves
July 25, 2013	Mountain View	United States	Shoreline Amphitheater	—N/a	Eli Young Band; Kacey Musgraves
July 27, 2013	Anaheim	United States	Angel Stadium of Anaheim	Eric Church	Eli Young Band; Kacey Musgraves
August 1, 2013	Charlotte	United States	Verizon Wireless Amphitheatre	—N/a	Eli Young Band; Kacey Musgraves
August 3, 2013	Atlanta	United States	Georgia Dome	Zac Brown Band	Eli Young Band; Kacey Musgraves
August 10, 2013	East Rutherford	United States	MetLife Stadium	Eric Church	Eli Young Band; Kacey Musgraves
August 15, 2013	Toronto	Canada	Molson Canadian Amphitheatre	—N/a	Eli Young Band; Kacey Musgraves
August 17, 2013	Detroit	United States	Ford Field	Eric Church	Eli Young Band; Kacey Musgraves
August 21, 2013	Hope Well	United States	CMAC	—N/a	Eli Young Band; Kacey Musgraves
August 23, 2013	Foxborough	United States	Gillette Stadium	Eric Church	Eli Young Band; Kacey Musgraves
August 24, 2013	Foxborough	United States	Gillette Stadium	Eric Church	Eli Young Band; Kacey Musgraves
