= Sun City Carnival Tour =

2009 concert tour by Kenny Chesney

- Tour by Kenny Chesney
- Location: North America
- Associated album: Lucky Old Sun; Greatest Hits II
- Start date: April 17, 2009
- End date: September 19, 2009
- Legs: 1
- No. of shows: 57

Kenny Chesney concert chronology
- The Poets & Pirates Tour (2008); Sun City Carnival Tour (2009); 2010 With a Two Tour (2010)

The Sun City Carnival Tour was the ninth headlining concert tour by American country music singer Kenny Chesney, in support of both his twelfth studio album, Lucky Old Sun (2008), and his second greatest hits compilation, Greatest Hits II (2009). The tour began on April 17, 2009, in Uncasville, Connecticut, ending on September 19, of that year in Indianapolis, Indiana. This tour was the biggest country music tour for 2009 and the sixth overall in music.

== Opening acts ==
- Lady Antebellum
- Miranda Lambert
- Montgomery Gentry
- Sugarland
- Jake Owen
- Uncle Kracker
- Zac Brown Band

== Set list ==
- Set list varies, not performed in same order every night, some songs not played at every show.
1. "Live Those Songs"
2. "Summertime"
3. "Beer in Mexico"
4. "Keg in the Closet"
5. "Out Last Night"
6. ”The Boys of Fall”
7. ”The Good Stuff”
8. "Big Star"
9. ”Reality”
10. ”Til It’s Gone”
11. "No Shoes, No Shirt, No Problems"
12. ”Somewhere with You”
13. "I Go Back"
14. ”Get Along”
15. "Anything but Mine"
16. ”Save It for a Rainy Day”
17. "Down the Road"
18. "Me and You"
19. ”There Goes My Life”
20. "Old Blue Chair"
21. ”All the Pretty Girls”
22. "Living in Fast Forward"
23. "Young
24. ”Noise”
25. ”American Kids”
26. ”Setting the World on Fire”
27. "Never Wanted Nothing More"
28. "Back Where I Come From" (Mac McAnally cover)
29. "How Forever Feels"
30. "Everybody Wants to Go to Heaven"
31. "When the Sun Goes Down"
32. "Don't Happen Twice"
33. "She Thinks My Tractor's Sexy"
34. "Jack & Diane" (John Cougar cover)

Encore

35. "Don't Blink"
36. "Better as a Memory"
37. "Take It Easy" (Eagles)
38. "Mary Jane's Last Dance" (Tom Petty and the Heartbreakers cover)
39. "The Joker" (Steve Miller Band cover)
40. "With or Without You" (U2 cover)
41. "The Fireman" (George Strait cover)
42. "Hurts So Good" (John CougarSteve Miller Band cover)
43. "Blister in the Sun" (Violent Femmes cover)
44. "You Really Got Me" (The Kinks cover)
45. "Rocky Mountain Way" (Joe Walsh cover)
46. "That Lucky Old Sun"

== Tour dates ==
Date	City	Country	Venue	Opening acts	Attendance	Revenue
North America
April 17, 2009	Uncasville	United States	Mohegan Sun Arena	Lady Antebellum; Miranda Lambert	15,053 / 15,053	$1,274,480
April 18, 2009	Uncasville	United States	Mohegan Sun Arena	Lady Antebellum; Miranda Lambert	15,053 / 15,053	$1,274,480
April 23, 2009	Albuquerque	United States	Journal Pavilion	Lady Antebellum; Miranda Lambert	12,549 / 15,004	$622,965
April 25, 2009	Las Vegas	United States	The Joint	Lady Antebellum; Miranda Lambert	4,072 / 4,072	$479,875
April 26, 2009 ^{A}	Indio	United States	Empire Polo Field	Lady Antebellum; Miranda Lambert	—	—
May 1, 2009	San Antonio	United States	AT&T Center	Lady Antebellum; Miranda Lambert	12,606 / 12,606	$661,649
May 2, 2009	Frisco	United States	Pizza Hut Park	Lady Antebellum; Miranda Lambert	25,026 / 25,026	$1,840,494
May 3, 2009	The Woodlands	United States	Cynthia Woods Mitchell Pavilion	Lady Antebellum; Miranda Lambert	15,750 / 15,750	$851,933
May 7, 2009	Des Moines	United States	Wells Fargo Arena	Lady Antebellum; Miranda Lambert	11,183 / 11,183	$601,596
May 8, 2009	Omaha	United States	Qwest Center	Lady Antebellum; Miranda Lambert	14,270 / 14,270	$919,296
May 9, 2009	Kansas City	United States	Sprint Center	Lady Antebellum; Miranda Lambert	13,922 / 13,922	$998,116
May 14, 2009	Pelham	United States	Verizon Wireless Music Center	Lady Antebellum; Miranda Lambert	—	—
May 15, 2009	Bossier City	United States	CenturyTel Center	Lady Antebellum; Miranda Lambert	—	—
May 16, 2009	North Little Rock	United States	Alltel Arena	Lady Antebellum; Miranda Lambert	13,614 / 14,583	$699,238
May 21, 2009	Greenville	United States	Bi-Lo Center	Lady Antebellum; Miranda Lambert	11,645 / 11,645	$614,444
May 22, 2009	Columbia	United States	Merriweather Post Pavilion	Lady Antebellum; Miranda Lambert	19,316 / 19,316	$959,972
May 23, 2009	Columbus	United States	Crew Stadium	Lady Antebellum; Miranda Lambert; Sugarland	25,088 / 25,088	$1,943,542
May 28, 2009	Alpharetta	United States	Verizon Wirless Amphitheatre	Lady Antebellum; Miranda Lambert	12,502 / 12,502	$882,270
May 30, 2009	Louisville	United States	Papa John's Cardinal Stadium	Lady Antebellum; Miranda Lambert; Sugarland; Montgomery Gentry	40,144 / 40,144	$2,881,832
June 4, 2009	Darien	United States	Darien Lake PAC	Lady Antebellum; Miranda Lambert	15,176 / 21,192	$674,435
June 6, 2009	Pittsburgh	United States	Heinz Field	Lady Antebellum; Miranda Lambert; Sugarland; Montgomery Gentry	47,510 / 49,103	$4,106,495
June 11, 2009	Moline	United States	iWireless Center	Lady Antebellum; Miranda Lambert	—	—
June 13, 2009	Chicago	United States	Soldier Field	Lady Antebellum; Miranda Lambert; Sugarland; Montgomery Gentry	48,763 / 50,109	$3,184,606
June 19, 2009 ^{B}	Somerset	United States	Float-Rite Amphitheatre	Lady Antebellum; Miranda Lambert	—	—
June 20, 2009	Fargo	United States	Fargodome	Lady Antebellum; Miranda Lambert	13,151 / 13,151	$754,837
June 24, 2009	Wantagh	United States	Jones Beach Theater	Lady Antebellum; Miranda Lambert	11,651 / 13,824	$704,435
June 25, 2009	Virginia Beach	United States	Verizon Wireless Amphitheater	Lady Antebellum; Miranda Lambert	17,407 / 20,055	$799,677
June 27, 2009	Philadelphia	United States	Lincoln Financial Field	Lady Antebellum; Miranda Lambert; Sugarland; Montgomery Gentry	52,343 / 52,343	$4,407,377
July 2, 2009	Fort Wayne	United States	Allen County War Memorial Coliseum	Lady Antebellum; Miranda Lambert	—	—
July 3, 2009 ^{C}	Milwaukee	United States	Marcus Amphitheater	Lady Antebellum; Miranda Lambert	22,643 / 22,643	$1,363,796
July 9, 2009	Edmonton	Canada	Commonwealth Stadium	Lady Antebellum; Miranda Lambert	33,910 / 44,500	$2,540,906
July 10, 2009	Calgary	Canada	Pengrowth Saddledome	Lady Antebellum; Miranda Lambert	12,364 / 12,364	$1,444,475
July 11, 2009	Merritt	Canada	Merritt Mountain Music Festival Grounds	Lady Antebellum; Miranda Lambert	—	—
July 14, 2009	Boise	United States	Taco Bell Arena	Lady Antebellum; Miranda Lambert	—	—
July 18, 2009	San Francisco	United States	AT&T Park	Lady Antebellum; Miranda Lambert	36,258 / 37,411	$2,516,347
July 23, 2009	Sandy	United States	Rio Tinto Stadium	Lady Antebellum; Miranda Lambert	21,215 / 23,687	$1,577,610
July 24, 2009 ^{D}	Cheyenne	United States	Cheyenne Frontier Days	Jake Owen	28,079 / 40,528	$1,633,914
July 25, 2009 ^{D}	Cheyenne	United States	Cheyenne Frontier Days	Jake Owen	28,079 / 40,528	$1,633,914
July 29, 2009	Stateline	United States	Harveys Outdoor Arena	Lady Antebellum; Miranda Lambert	7,262 / 7,262	$672,358
August 1, 2009	Seattle	United States	Qwest Field	Lady Antebellum; Miranda Lambert; Sugarland; Montgomery Gentry	42,092 / 45,064	$3,208,188
August 6, 2009	Orange Beach	United States	Amphitheater at the Wharf	Lady Antebellum; Miranda Lambert	9,641 / 9,641	$858,049
August 7, 2009	Jacksonville	United States	Jacksonville Veterans Memorial Arena	Lady Antebellum; Miranda Lambert	12,243 / 12,243	$762,183
August 8, 2009	Tampa	United States	Ford Amphitheatre	Lady Antebellum; Miranda Lambert	19,404 / 19,404	$1,106,334
August 13, 2009	Hartford	United States	Comcast Theatre	Lady Antebellum; Miranda Lambert	24,087 / 24,087	$1,133,213
August 15, 2009	Foxborough	United States	Gillette Stadium	Lady Antebellum; Miranda Lambert; Sugarland; Montgomery Gentry	57,890 / 57,890	$5,041,001
August 19, 2009	Ottawa	Canada	Scotiabank Place	Lady Antebellum; Miranda Lambert	12,331 / 12,331	$903,518
August 20, 2009	Toronto	Canada	Molson Canadian Amphitheatre	Lady Antebellum; Miranda Lambert	16,101 / 16,101	$934,644
August 22, 2009	Detroit	United States	Ford Field	Lady Antebellum; Miranda Lambert; Sugarland; Montgomery Gentry	49,215 / 49,215	$3,843,639
August 28, 2009	Syracuse	United States	New York State Fair	Jake Owen	15,157 / 16,167	$885,190
August 29, 2009	Bristow	United States	Nissan Pavilion	Lady Antebellum; Miranda Lambert	22,670 / 22,670	$1,230,552
August 30, 2009	Raleigh	United States	Time Warner Cable Music Pavilion	Lady Antebellum; Miranda Lambert	19,985 / 19,985	$996,260
September 10, 2009	Biloxi	United States	Mississippi Coast Coliseum	Lady Antebellum; Miranda Lambert	—	—
September 11, 2009	Tallahassee	United States	Leon County Civic Center	Miranda Lambert	—	—
September 12, 2009	North Charleston	United States	North Charleston Coliseum	Miranda Lambert	—	—
September 15, 2009	New York City	United States	Hard Rock Cafe	Uncle Kracker	—	—
September 17, 2009	Bloomington	United States	U.S. Cellular Coliseum	—	—	—
September 19, 2009	Indianapolis	United States	Lucas Oil Stadium	Miranda Lambert; Sugarland; Montgomery Gentry; Zac Brown Band	45,178 / 45,178	$3,016,365

Festivals and fairs
^{[A]} This concert was a part of the Stagecoach Festival, held at the same venue as the Coachella Music Festival, near Palm Springs, CA.
^{[B]} This concert was a part of the Apple River Country Splash Festival.
^{[C]} This concert was a part of Summerfest.
^{[D]} These concerts were part of the Cheyenne Frontier Days.

Notes

The Frisco, Texas concert was abruptly called-off due to torrential rain and lighting fifty minutes into the show, and was made-up on May 17, 2009.
