= The Big Revival Tour =

2015 concert tour by Kenny Chesney

The Big Revival Tour presented by Corona Light
- Tour by Kenny Chesney
- Promotional poster for the tour
- Location: North America
- Associated album: The Big Revival
- Start date: March 26, 2015
- End date: August 29, 2015
- Legs: 1
- No. of shows: 61
- Box office: U.S. $116.4 million

Kenny Chesney concert chronology
- No Shoes Nation Tour (2013); The Big Revival Tour (2015); Spread the Love Tour (2016)

The Big Revival Tour presented by Corona Light was the fourteenth headlining concert tour by American country music artist Kenny Chesney, in support of his sixteenth studio album The Big Revival (2014). Ten of the shows were merged with Jason Aldean's Burn It Down Tour. Eric Church co-headlined five of them with Chesney while Miranda Lambert co-headlined the show at Soldier Field in Chicago. This was the biggest country music concert tour of 2015 and the second-ranked North American one of the year, after grossing over $116.4 million.

== Background ==
The tour was first announced in October 2014, when Chesney was promoting his album on Good Morning America. When asked about the tour Chesney says, "I've been ready to get out there for a long time. Now that we're announced I'm fired up! This new music brings a new energy to the show, and it's gonna take what we do to a whole other level. Days after the tour was announced, it was revealed that ten of the shows in the summer would be combined with Jason Aldean's Burn It Down Tour. These ten shows will be played at football stadiums across America. On this ten show merge, Chesney's says; "There aren't a lot of guys out there who can hit it the way Jason does, so I'm glad we're able to bring both of our tours together for 10 nights the summer. I know what me and the guys are bringing in terms of music, and I know Jason can hang with us!" Aldean praised Kenny by saying that he "is the guy everybody in country music looks up to when they think about workin’ hard, building your career out on the road and getting to eventually play stadiums". Chesney also gave Aldean advice when Aldean started playing stadiums a few years ago and the two "have a real friendship." It was later announced that Chesney will also merge an additional five shows with Eric Church. These shows will also be played at football stadiums. According to Church, he had a good time in his previous tour with Chesney, and that Chesney is "an artist that isn't afraid to let you come full blast and do what you do. It's rare you get to tour with someone you respect and you are friends with. I can't wait to do it again."

Additional solo dates were announced in January 2015.

The promotional poster for Chesney's joint shows with Aldean

== Set list ==
1. "Drink It Up"
2. "Reality"
3. "Beer In Mexico"
4. "Keg In The Closet"
5. "Til It's Gone"
6. ”Here and Now”
7. "Summertime"
8. ”We Do”
9. "Pirate Flag"
10. "No Shoes, No Shirt, No Problems"
11. "Big Star"
12. "Somewhere with You"
13. "I Go Back"
14. ”Get Along”
15. ”Spread the Love”
16. "Knowing You"
17. "Living In Fast Forward"
18. "Young"
19. "Whole Lotta Rosie" (AC/DC cover)
20. ”Everybody Wants to Go to Heaven”
21. "American Kids"
22. ”Wild Child”
23. "Anything but Mine"
24. ”Hemingway’s Whiskey”
25. "There Goes My Life"
26. "How Forever Feels"
27. "Never Wanted Nothing More"
28. ”Don't Blink”
29. ”Shiftwork”
30. "When The Sun Goes Down"
31. ”I Lost It”
32. "Don't Happen Twice"
33. ”You Save Me”
34. "Out Last Night"
35. "The Boys of Fall"
36. ”Live a Little”
37. ”Coastal”
38. "You and Tequila"
39. ”You Had Me from Hello”
40. "She Thinks My Tractor's Sexy"

== Opening acts ==
- Jake Owen (select dates)
- Brantley Gilbert (select dates)
- Cole Swindell (select dates)
- Chase Rice (select dates)
- Old Dominion (select dates)

== Tour dates ==
Date	City	Country	Venue	Opening acts	Attendance	Gross revenue
Promotional Show
August 16, 2014	Orange Beach	United States	Flora-Bama Lounge	N/A	40,000	N/A
North America
March 26, 2015	Nashville	United States	Bridgestone Arena	Jake Owen; Chase Rice	28,682 / 28,682	$1,873,344
March 27, 2015	Nashville	United States	Bridgestone Arena	Jake Owen; Chase Rice	28,682 / 28,682	$1,873,344
March 28, 2015	Columbia, South Carolina	United States	Colonial Life Arena	Jake Owen; Chase Rice	12,667 / 12,667	$672,313
April 3, 2015	Las Vegas	United States	The Joint	Jake Owen; Chase Rice	8,135 / 8,135	$1,220,250
April 4, 2015	Las Vegas	United States	The Joint	Jake Owen; Chase Rice	8,135 / 8,135	$1,220,250
April 8, 2015	Greenville	United States	Bon Secours Wellness Arena	Jake Owen; Chase Rice	10,802 / 10,802	$564,465
April 9, 2015	Birmingham	United States	BJCC	Jake Owen; Chase Rice	10,101 / 10,101	$530,740
April 11, 2015	Fort Lauderdale	United States	Tortuga Music Festival	Jake Owen; Chase Rice	—	—
April 16, 2015	Greensboro	United States	Greensboro Coliseum	Jake Owen; Chase Rice	12,556 / 12,556	$640,935
April 17, 2015	Louisville	United States	KFC Yum! Center	Jake Owen; Chase Rice	15,461 / 15,461	$874,935
April 23, 2015 ^{[D]}	Albany	United States	Times Union Center	Jake Owen; Chase Rice	10,397 / 10,397	$527,649
April 24, 2015	Uncasville	United States	Mohegan Sun Arena	Jake Owen; Chase Rice	15,278 / 15,278	$1,249,829
April 25, 2015	Uncasville	United States	Mohegan Sun Arena	Jake Owen; Chase Rice	15,278 / 15,278	$1,249,829
April 29, 2015	Glendale	United States	Gila River Arena	Jake Owen; Chase Rice	13,278 / 13,278	$765,362
May 2, 2015 ^{[A]}	Santa Clara	United States	Levi's Stadium	Jake Owen; Cole Swindell; Old Dominion	46,549 / 47,498	$4,765,582
May 6, 2015	St. Louis	United States	Scottrade Center	Jake Owen; Chase Rice	11,388 / 13,737	$596,646
May 7, 2015	Des Moines	United States	Wells Fargo Arena	Jake Owen; Chase Rice	13,201 / 13,201	$781,073
May 9, 2015 ^{[B]}	Indianapolis	United States	Lucas Oil Stadium	Eric Church; Brantley Gilbert; Chase Rice; Old Dominion	43,675 / 44,872	$4,064,335
May 12, 2015	Hidalgo	United States	State Farm Arena	Chase Rice	5,213 / 5,213	$684,291
May 14, 2015	Tulsa	United States	BOK Center	Jake Owen; Chase Rice	10,805 / 12,156	$604,952
May 16, 2015 ^{[A]}	Arlington	United States	AT&T Stadium	Brantley Gilbert; Cole Swindell; Old Dominion	47,256 / 47,256	$4,210,345
May 21, 2015	Austin	United States	Austin360 Amphitheater	Jake Owen; Chase Rice	13,041 / 13,041	$745,654
May 22, 2015	Houston	United States	BBVA Compass Stadium	Jake Owen; Chase Rice	18,448 / 20,338	$1,103,706
May 23, 2015	Baton Rouge	United States	Bayou Country Superfest	Jake Owen; Chase Rice	—	—
May 27, 2015	Columbia, Maryland	United States	Merriweather Post Pavilion	Jake Owen; Chase Rice	17,432 / 17,432	$1,135,180
May 28, 2015	Raleigh	United States	PNC Arena	Jake Owen; Chase Rice	10,282 / 12,346	$572,808
May 30, 2015 ^{[B]}	Pittsburgh	United States	Heinz Field	Eric Church; Brantley Gilbert; Chase Rice; Old Dominion	55,381 / 55,381	$5,135,827
June 4, 2015	Evansville	United States	Ford Center	Jake Owen; Chase Rice	9,898 / 9,898	$544,176
June 6, 2015 ^{[C]}	Chicago	United States	Soldier Field	Miranda Lambert; Brantley Gilbert; Chase Rice; Old Dominion	43,630 / 48,278	$3,776,207
June 11, 2015	Charlotte	United States	Time Warner Cable Arena	Jake Owen; Chase Rice	10,227 / 10,355	$511,756
June 13, 2015 ^{[B]}	Atlanta	United States	Georgia Dome	Eric Church; Brantley Gilbert; Chase Rice; Old Dominion	45,857 / 48,464	$3,643,658
June 14, 2015	Jacksonville	United States	Florida Country Superfest	—	—	—
June 18, 2015	Sioux Falls	United States	Denny Sanford Premier Center	Jake Owen; Chase Rice	10,631 / 10,631	$779,008
June 20, 2015 ^{[A]}	Green Bay	United States	Lambeau Field	Brantley Gilbert; Cole Swindell; Old Dominion	53,363 / 53,363	$5,867,106
June 21, 2015	Columbus	United States	Ohio Country Superfest	—	—	—
June 25, 2015	Vancouver	Canada	Ambleside	Jake Owen; Chase Rice	10,145 / 12,000	$642,620
June 27, 2015 ^{[A]}	Seattle	United States	CenturyLink Field	Brantley Gilbert; Cole Swindell; Old Dominion	49,680 / 51,610	$4,428,366
July 2, 2015	Tucson	United States	Anselmo Valencia Tori Amphitheater	—	4,839 / 4,839	$417,345
July 3, 2015	Las Vegas	United States	The Joint	—	8,219 / 8,219	$1,183,500
July 4, 2015	Las Vegas	United States	The Joint	—	8,219 / 8,219	$1,183,500
July 8, 2015	Hopewell	United States	CMAC	Jake Owen; Chase Rice	14,772 / 14,772	$696,270
July 9, 2015	Cleveland	United States	Quicken Loans Arena	Jake Owen; Chase Rice	12,151 / 13,300	$756,562
July 11, 2015 ^{[B]}	Philadelphia	United States	Lincoln Financial Field	Eric Church; Brantley Gilbert; Chase Rice; Old Dominion	55,131 / 55,131	$5,952,700
July 16, 2015	Lincoln	United States	Pinnacle Bank Arena	Jake Owen; Chase Rice	13,558 / 13,558	$875,608
July 18, 2015 ^{[A]}	Minneapolis	United States	Target Field	Brantley Gilbert; Cole Swindell; Old Dominion	84,479 / 84,479	$7,816,355
July 19, 2015 ^{[A]}	Minneapolis	United States	Target Field	Brantley Gilbert; Cole Swindell; Old Dominion	84,479 / 84,479	$7,816,355
July 22, 2015	Lake Tahoe	United States	Harveys Outdoor Arena	Jake Owen; Chase Rice	7,524 / 7,524	$730,371
July 23, 2015	Fresno	United States	Save Mart Center	Jake Owen; Chase Rice	10,132 / 11,513	$566,503
July 25, 2015 ^{[A]}	Pasadena	United States	Rose Bowl	Brantley Gilbert; Cole Swindell; Old Dominion	53,864 / 53,864	$4,297,535
July 29, 2015	Southaven	United States	BankPlus Amphitheater at Snowden Grove	Jake Owen; Chase Rice	9,835 / 10,973	$604,189
July 30, 2015	Rogers	United States	Walmart Arkansas Music Pavilion	Jake Owen; Chase Rice	10,276 / 10,276	$733,960
August 1, 2015 ^{[A]}	Kansas City	United States	Arrowhead Stadium	Brantley Gilbert; Cole Swindell; Old Dominion	53,864 / 53,864	$5,394,025
August 6, 2015	Salt Lake City	United States	EnergySolutions Arena	Jake Owen; Chase Rice	9,689 / 10,548	$505,748
August 8, 2015 ^{[A]}	Denver	United States	Sports Authority Field at Mile High	Brantley Gilbert; Cole Swindell; Old Dominion	54,674 / 54,674	$5,279,591
August 13, 2015	Bangor	United States	Darling's Waterfront Pavilion	Chase Rice	13,381 / 13,381	$898,901
August 15, 2015 ^{[A]}	East Rutherford	United States	MetLife Stadium	Brantley Gilbert; Cole Swindell; Old Dominion	58,642 / 58,642	$6,067,017
August 19, 2015	Ottawa	Canada	Canadian Tire Centre	Jake Owen; Chase Rice	11,166 / 12,179	$576,122
August 20, 2015	Hamilton	Canada	FirstOntario Centre	Jake Owen; Chase Rice	12,372 / 12,372	$700,723
August 22, 2015 ^{[B]}	Detroit	United States	Ford Field	Eric Church; Brantley Gilbert; Chase Rice; Old Dominion	49,285 / 49,285	$4,903,524
August 28, 2015 ^{[A]}	Foxborough	United States	Gillette Stadium	Brantley Gilbert; Cole Swindell; Old Dominion	120,206 / 120,206	$11,624,917
August 29, 2015 ^{[A]}	Foxborough	United States	Gillette Stadium	Brantley Gilbert; Cole Swindell; Old Dominion	120,206 / 120,206	$11,624,917
Total					1,331,518 / 1,358,026	$114,094,584

Notes
^{A} These shows are with Jason Aldean.
^{B} These shows are with Eric Church.
^{C} This show is with Miranda Lambert.
^{D} This show is with Chase Rice only.

== Blood marrow donations ==
For this tour Chensey's No Shoes Nation teamed up with the Love Hope Strength Foundation's Get on the List Campaign. At the stadium shows fans could sign up to be bone marrow donors and the donors were then entered into the national donor bank in cooperation with Delete Blood Cancer. Twenty-five matches were found. About the matches found Chesney stated: "This was something so hard to believe, given how easy and simple it is", "I'm thrilled to hear 25 matches have already been found. Maybe we should call them No Shoes, All Heart Nation."
