= Brothers of the Sun Tour =

2012 concert tour by Kenny Chesney and Tim McGraw

- Tour by Kenny Chesney and Tim McGraw
- Promotional banner for the tour
- Location: United States
- Associated album: Welcome to the Fishbowl; Emotional Traffic
- Start date: June 2, 2012
- End date: August 25, 2012
- Legs: 1
- No. of shows: 23
- Box office: US$96.5 million
Kenny Chesney tour chronology
Goin' Coastal Tour (2011)	Brothers of the Sun Tour (2012)	No Shoes Nation Tour (2013)
Tim McGraw tour chronology
Tim McGraw & Faith Hill Australia 2012 Tour (2012)	Brothers of the Sun Tour (2012)	Two Lanes of Freedom Tour (2013)

The Brothers of the Sun Tour was a co-headlining concert tour by American country music singers Kenny Chesney and Tim McGraw. It took place in 22 cities at 22 venues across the United States. Chesney and McGraw began the tour at Raymond James Stadium in Tampa, Florida on June 2, 2012, and ended it with two shows at Gillette Stadium in Foxboro, Massachusetts on August 25, 2012. The tour grossed over $96 million in ticket sales and drew at least one million in attendance.

== Background ==
In November 2011, it was announced that country singers Tim McGraw and Kenny Chesney would reunite for a stadium tour throughout North America. The duo had previously toured together as part of the George Strait Country Music Fest in 2001. Following the announcement, it was revealed the tour would feature special guests Grace Potter and the Nocturnals and Jake Owen. Tickets for most dates went on general sale to the public on December 11, 2011.

== Set lists ==
Tim McGraw
1. "Felt Good on My Lips"
2. "For a Little While"
3. "Down on the Farm"
4. "Real Good Man"
5. "Last Dollar (Fly Away)"
6. "Unbroken"
7. "Everywhere"
8. "Where the Green Grass Grows
9. "Mexicoma"
10. "All I Want Is a Life"
11. "Just to See You Smile"
12. "Better Than I Used to Be"
13. "Let It Go"
14. "How Bad Do You Want It"
15. "Back When"
16. "Sing Me Back Home" (Merle Haggard cover)
17. "Something Like That"
18. "Southern Voice"
19. "Live Like You Were Dying"
20. "The Cowboy in Me"
21. "I Like It, I Love It"
22. "Truck Yeah"
Kenny Chesney
1. "Beer In Mexico"
2. ”Here and Now”
3. "Keg In The Closet"
4. "Summertime"
5. "Reality"
6. ”Til It's Gone”
7. "Live Those Songs"
8. ”We Do”
9. "No Shoes, No Shirt, No Problems"
10. "What I Need to Do"
11. "I Go Back"
12. "Come Over"
13. "Anything but Mine"
14. "You and Tequila" (with Grace Potter)
15. "Back Where I Come From"
16. ”Happy Does”
17. "Living In Fast Forward"
18. "Young"
19. "Somewhere with You"
20. "Never Wanted Nothing More"
21. ”Tip of My Tongue”
22. "On the Coast of Somewhere Beautiful"
23. "Out Last Night"
24. ”Knowing You”
25. "When The Sun Goes Down"
26. "Don't Happen Twice"
27. "The Boys of Fall"
28. "Feel Like a Rock Star"
29. "Refried Dreams"
30. "She Thinks My Tractor's Sexy"
31. "Indian Outlaw"
32. "Running on Empty" (Jackson Browne cover)

== Tour dates ==
List of concerts, showing date, city, country, venue, opening act, tickets sold, number of available tickets and amount of gross revenue
Date	City	Country	Venue	Opening act	Attendance	Revenue
North America
June 2, 2012	Tampa	United States	Raymond James Stadium	Grace Potter and the Nocturnals; Jake Owen	48,443 / 50,604	$4,320,106
June 3, 2012	Atlanta	United States	Georgia Dome	Grace Potter and the Nocturnals; Jake Owen	44,124 / 46,565	$3,924,229
June 9, 2012	Arlington	United States	AT&T Stadium	Grace Potter and the Nocturnals; Jake Owen	47,269 / 50,425	$4,421,768
June 10, 2012	Kansas City	United States	Arrowhead Stadium	Grace Potter and the Nocturnals; Jake Owen	46,346 / 49,747	$3,831,962
June 16, 2012	Philadelphia	United States	Lincoln Financial Field	Grace Potter and the Nocturnals; Jake Owen	53,111 / 53,111	$5,541,757
June 23, 2012	Nashville	United States	LP Field	Grace Potter and the Nocturnals; Jake Owen	49,869 / 52,332	$3,622,116
June 24, 2012	Charlotte	United States	Bank of America Stadium	Grace Potter and the Nocturnals; Jake Owen	44,482 / 47,835	$3,404,455
June 30, 2012	Pittsburgh	United States	Heinz Field	Grace Potter and the Nocturnals; Jake Owen	53,325 / 57,452	$4,841,193
July 1, 2012	Cincinnati	United States	Paul Brown Stadium	Grace Potter and the Nocturnals; Jake Owen	42,716 / 45,764	$3,495,146
July 7, 2012	Chicago	United States	Soldier Field	Grace Potter and the Nocturnals; Jake Owen	51,100 / 51,100	$5,109,399
July 8, 2012	Minneapolis	United States	Target Field	Grace Potter and the Nocturnals; Jake Owen	42,524 / 42,524	$4,483,461
July 14, 2012	Anaheim	United States	Angel Stadium	Grace Potter and the Nocturnals; Jake Owen	44,832 / 44,832	$3,963,039
July 15, 2012	Oakland	United States	O.co Coliseum	Grace Potter and the Nocturnals; Jake Owen	41,245 / 41,449	$3,128,663
July 21, 2012	Denver	United States	Sports Authority Field at Mile High	Grace Potter and the Nocturnals; Jake Owen	50,020 / 50,020	$4,401,805
July 28, 2012	Indianapolis	United States	Lucas Oil Stadium	Grace Potter and the Nocturnals; Jake Owen	41,671 / 43,864	$3,509,151
July 29, 2012	Cleveland	United States	Cleveland Browns Stadium	Grace Potter and the Nocturnals; Jake Owen	45,321 / 48,495	$3,511,455
August 3, 2012	New Orleans	United States	Mercedes-Benz Superdome	Grace Potter and the Nocturnals; Jake Owen	37,916 / 40,876	$3,385,855
August 4, 2012	Houston	United States	Reliant Stadium	Grace Potter and the Nocturnals; Jake Owen	38,242 / 41,849	$3,600,279
August 11, 2012	East Rutherford	United States	MetLife Stadium	Grace Potter and the Nocturnals; Jake Owen	56,285 / 56,285	$5,523,669
August 12, 2012	Landover	United States	FedExField	Grace Potter and the Nocturnals; Jake Owen	46,389 / 50,179	$3,953,164
August 18, 2012	Detroit	United States	Ford Field	Grace Potter and the Nocturnals; Jake Owen	48,943 / 48,943	$4,560,108
August 24, 2012	Foxborough	United States	Gillette Stadium	Grace Potter and the Nocturnals; Jake Owen	111,209 / 111,209	$9,926,110
August 25, 2012	Foxborough	United States	Gillette Stadium	Grace Potter and the Nocturnals; Jake Owen	111,209 / 111,209	$9,926,110
Total					1,085,382 / 1,125,460	$96,458,890
