= Live: Live Those Songs Again =

Live album by Kenny Chesney
- Released: September 19, 2006
- Genre: Country
- Length: 66:48
- Label: BNA
- Producers: Buddy Cannon; Kenny Chesney

Kenny Chesney chronology
The Road and the Radio (2005)	Live: Live Those Songs Again (2006)	Just Who I Am: Poets & Pirates (2007)

Professional ratings
Review scores
Source	Rating
Allmusic	2.5/5 stars

Live: Live Those Songs Again is the first live album by country music singer Kenny Chesney, released on September 19, 2006 via BNA Records. The album includes live renditions of 14 of his songs, ten of which were singles. "Live Those Songs", "Never Gonna Feel Like That Again", "On the Coast of Somewhere Beautiful", and "Back Where I Come From" were never released as singles by Chesney, although the latter was previously a single in 1990 for Mac McAnally from his album Simple Life. The recordings for the album were taken from concerts in Carson, CA, Knoxville, TN, Nassau, Bahamas, Nashville, TN and Pittsburgh, PA.

== Track listing ==
No.	Title	Writer(s)	Length
1.	"Live Those Songs"	Chris Bain, Cole Deggs, David Lowe	4:08
2.	"Young"	Craig Wiseman, Naoise Sheridan, Steve McEwan	4:31
3.	"Never Gonna Feel Like That Again"	Paul Overstreet, Phillip Coleman	3:49
4.	"Beer in Mexico"	Kenny Chesney	4:37
5.	"Keg in the Closet"	Chesney, Brett James	4:05
6.	"What I Need to Do"	Tom Damphier, Bill Luther	4:16
7.	"I Go Back"	Chesney	4:52
8.	"When the Sun Goes Down" (featuring Uncle Kracker)	James	5:04
9.	"On the Coast of Somewhere Beautiful"	LuAnn Reid, Luther, Danny Simpson	4:04
10.	"Anything But Mine"	Scooter Carusoe	5:34
11.	"Back Where I Come From"	Mac McAnally	4:45
12.	"Don't Happen Twice"	Curtis Lance, Thom McHugh	4:03
13.	"How Forever Feels"	Wendell Mobley, Tony Mullins	5:34
14.	"She Thinks My Tractor's Sexy"	Paul Overstreet, Jim Collins	6:03
Total length:			66:48

== Musicians ==
- Wyatt Beard – keyboards, background vocals
- Kenny Chesney – lead vocals, acoustic guitar, electric guitar
- James Fahlgren – steel drums
- Jim Bob Gairrett – steel guitar, electric guitar
- Tim Hensley – acoustic guitar, electric guitar, gut string guitar, background vocals
- Nicholas Hoffman – fiddle, electric guitar, background vocals
- Steve Marshall – bass guitar
- Clayton Mitchell – electric guitar, background vocals
- Sean Paddock – drums, percussion, background vocals

== Charts ==
=== Weekly charts ===
Chart (2006)	Peak position
US Billboard 200	4
US Top Country Albums (Billboard)	1

=== Year-end charts ===
Chart (2006)	Position
US Top Country Albums (Billboard)	43
Chart (2007)	Position
US Top Country Albums (Billboard)	43

== Certifications ==
Region	Certification	Certified units/sales
United States (RIAA)	Gold	500,000^{^}
^{^} Shipments figures based on certification alone.
