= 2004 Country Music Association Awards =

Annual US music awards ceremony

- Date: November 9, 2004
- Location: Grand Ole Opry House, Nashville, Tennessee
- Hosted by: Brooks & Dunn

Highlights
- Most wins: Kenny Chesney; Brad Paisley; Alison Krauss (2 each)
- Most nominations: Alan Jackson (7)

Television/radio coverage
- Network: CBS

The 2004 Country Music Association Awards, 38th Ceremony, on November 9, 2004, hosted by CMA Award Winning duo, Brooks & Dunn. This was the final ceremony to be held in the Grand Ole Opry House in Nashville, Tennessee.

== Winners and Nominees ==
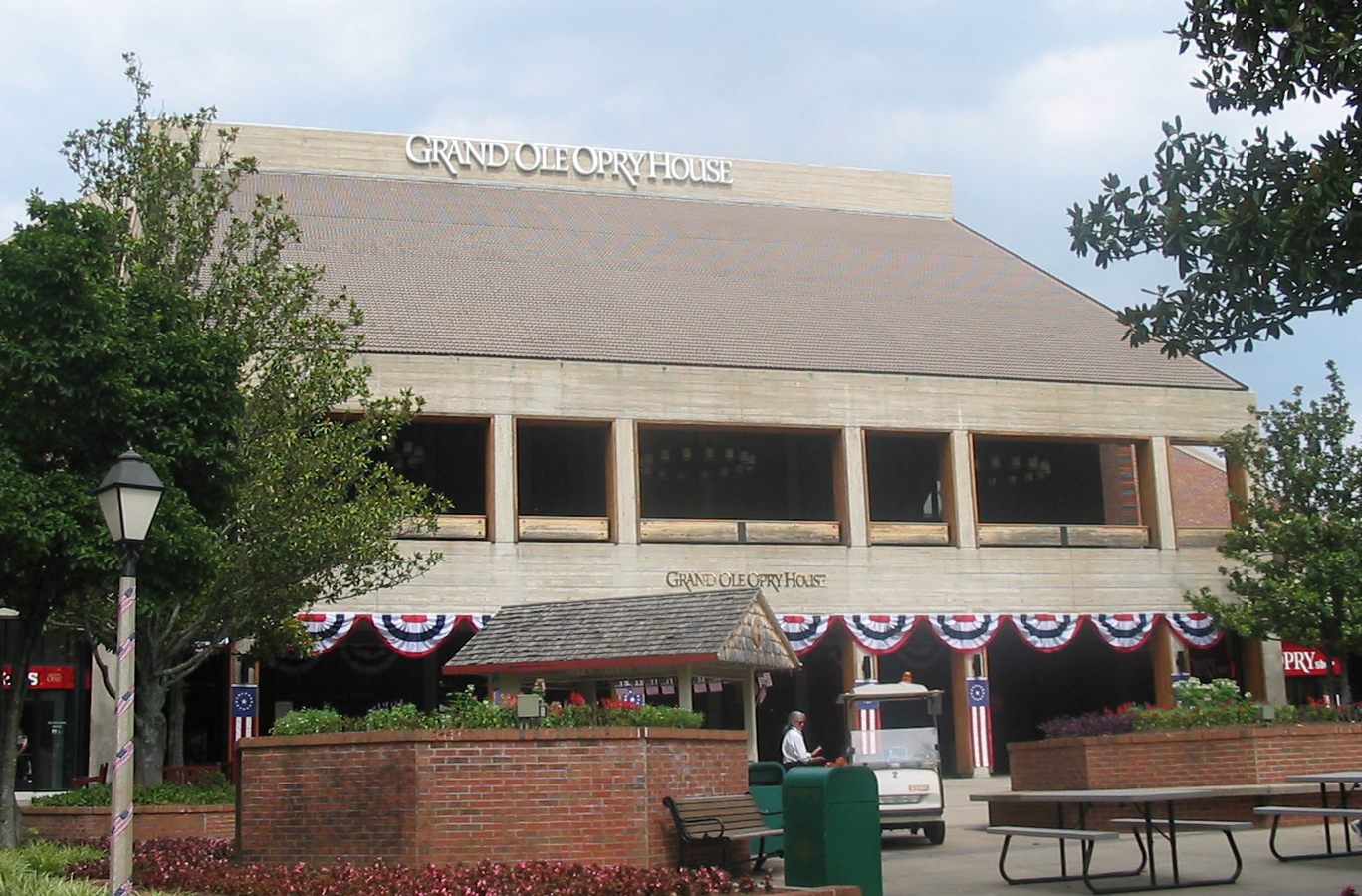
Grand Ole Opry House

Entertainer of the Year	Album of the Year
Kenny Chesney; Brooks & Dunn; Alan Jackson; Toby Keith; Tim McGraw	When The Sun Goes Down – Kenny Chesney; Here For The Party – Gretchen Wilson; Mud On The Tires – Brad Paisley; Red Dirt Road – Brooks & Dunn; Shock’N Y’All – Toby Keith
Male Vocalist of the Year	Female Vocalist of the Year
Keith Urban; Kenny Chesney; Alan Jackson; Toby Keith; George Strait	Martina McBride; Terri Clark; Sara Evans; Alison Krauss; Reba McEntire
Vocal Group of the Year	Vocal Duo of the Year
Rascal Flatts; Alabama; Diamond Rio; Lonestar; Trick Pony	Brooks & Dunn; Big & Rich; Blue County; Montgomery Gentry; The Warren Brothers
Single of the Year	Song of the Year
“Live Like You Were Dying” – Tim McGraw; "I Love This Bar" — Toby Keith; “Redneck Woman” — Gretchen Wilson; “Remember When” — Alan Jackson; “Whiskey Lullaby” — Brad Paisley and Alison Krauss	“Live Like You Were Dying” — Tim Nichols, Craig Wiseman; “Long Black Train” — Josh Turner; “Redneck Woman” — Gretchen Wilson, John Rich; “Remember When” — Alan Jackson; “Whiskey Lullaby” — Bill Anderson, Jon Randall
Horizon Award	Musician of the Year
Gretchen Wilson; Dierks Bentley; Big & Rich; Julie Roberts; Josh Turner	Dann Huff – Guitar; Matt Chamberlain – Drums; Kenny Greenberg – Electric Guitar; Larry Paxton – Bass Guitar; Brent Rowan – Guitar
Music Video of the Year	Music Event of the Year
“Whiskey Lullaby” — Brad Paisley and Alison Krauss; “I Love This Bar” — Toby Keith; “It’s Five O’Clock Somewhere” — Alan Jackson and Jimmy Buffett; “Redneck Woman” — Gretchen Wilson; “Remember When” — Alan Jackson	“Whiskey Lullaby” — Brad Paisley and Alison Krauss; “Creepin’ In” — Norah Jones with Dolly Parton; “Hey Good Lookin'” — Jimmy Buffett, Clint Black, Kenny Chesney, Alan Jackson, Toby Keith and George Strait; “How’s the World Treating You” — James Taylor and Alison Krauss; “When The Sun Goes Down” — Kenny Chesney and Uncle Kracker

== Performances ==
- Alan Jackson and Patty Loveless — "Monday Morning Church"
- Toby Keith and Krystal Keith — "Mockingbird"
- Tim McGraw — "Live Like You Were Dying"
- Alison Krauss and Brad Paisley — "Whiskey Lullaby"
- Shania Twain and Billy Currington — "Party for Two"
- Gretchen Wilson — "When I Think About Cheatin'"
- Kenny Chesney — "I Go Back"
- Sara Evans — "Suds in the Bucket"
- Rascal Flatts — "Bless the Broken Road"
- Reba McEntire — "He Gets That From Me"
- George Strait — "I Hate Everything"
- Martina McBride — "God's Will"
- Julie Roberts — "Back Seat"
- Josh Turner — "Long Black Train"
- Jimmy Buffett and Clint Black — "Hey Good Lookin'"
- Terri Clark — "Girls Lie Too"
- Montgomery Gentry — "Gone"
- Dierks Bentley — "What Was I Thinkin'"
- Brooks & Dunn — "Better All The Time"
- Keith Urban — "Days Go By"
- Big & Rich — "Rollin'"
- Willie Nelson — "For The Good Times"
- Faith Hill — "Help Me Make It Through the Night"
