= Acrisure Stadium =

Stadium in Pittsburgh, Pennsylvania

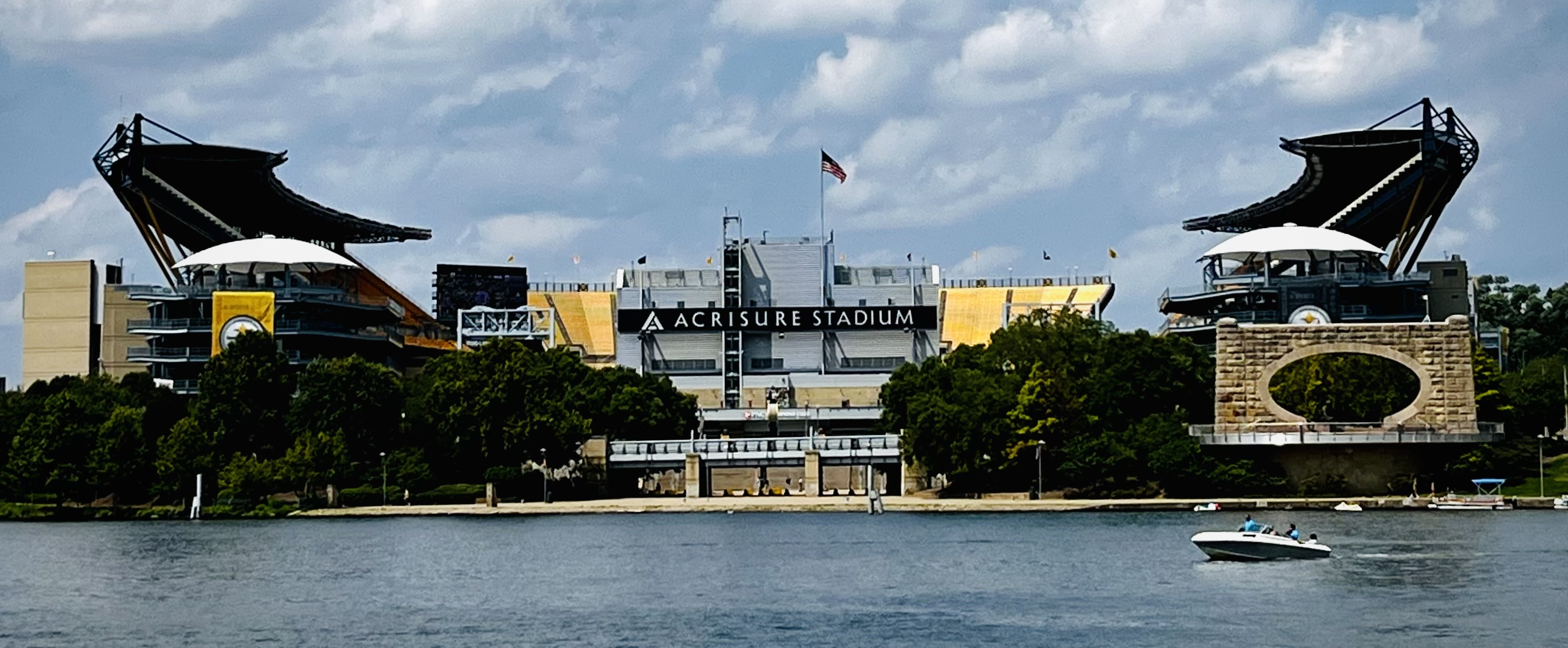
- Acrisure Stadium in 2024

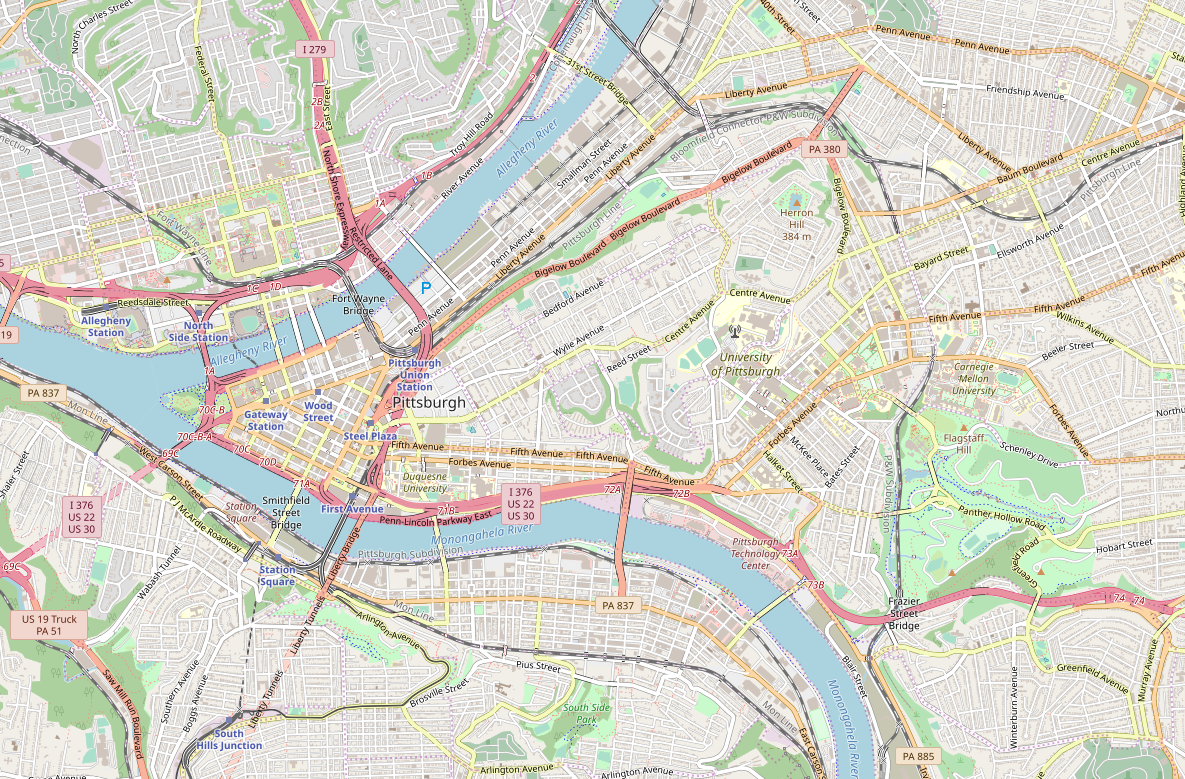
- Location in Pittsburgh Location in Pennsylvania Location in the United States
- Former names: Heinz Field (2001–2022)
- Address: 100 Art Rooney Avenue
- Location: Pittsburgh, Pennsylvania, U.S.
- Coordinates: 40°26′48″N 80°0′57″W
- Owner: Sports & Exhibition Authority of Pittsburgh and Allegheny County
- Operator: Pittsburgh Steelers; University of Pittsburgh
- Capacity: 68,400 (2015–present) Former capacity: List: 65,500 (2011–2014); 65,050 (2006–2010); 64,450 (2001–2006)
- Executive suites: 129
- Surface: Tahoma 31 Bermudagrass (2026–Present) Kentucky bluegrass (2009–2026)
- Record attendance: 73,117 (Taylor Swift, The Eras Tour, June 17, 2023)
- Public transit: Allegheny

Construction
- Groundbreaking: June 18, 1999
- Opened: August 18, 2001
- Renovated: 2007
- Expanded: 2015
- Cost: US$281 million ($511 million in 2025 dollars)
- Architects: Populous (then Bortles Sport Architecture); WTW Architects
- Project managers: NW Getz & Associates, Inc.
- Structural engineers: Bliss & Nyitray, Inc
- Services engineers: M-E Engineers, Inc.
- General contractor: Hunt Construction Group/Mascaro Construction Company, LP

Tenants
- Pittsburgh Panthers football (NCAA) (2001–present); Pittsburgh Steelers (NFL) (2001–present)

Website
- acrisurestadium.com

Acrisure Stadium, formerly (and still colloquially) known as Heinz Field, is a stadium located in the North Shore neighborhood of Pittsburgh, Pennsylvania, U.S. It primarily serves as the home of the Pittsburgh Steelers of the National Football League (NFL) and the Pittsburgh Panthers of the National Collegiate Athletic Association (NCAA). The stadium opened in 2001 as Heinz Field, following the controlled implosion of the teams' previous home, Three Rivers Stadium. In 2021, the owners of the Heinz name, now owned by Kraft Heinz, declined to renew the stadium's naming rights. The City of Pittsburgh approved Acrisure's bid to purchase the rights in 2022.

Funded in conjunction with PNC Park and the David L. Lawrence Convention Center, the $281 million (equivalent to $510.93 million in 2025) stadium stands along the Ohio River, on the North Side of Pittsburgh in the North Shore neighborhood. The stadium was designed with the city's history of steel production in mind, which led to the inclusion of 12,000 tons of steel into construction. Ground for the stadium was broken in June 1999, and the first football game was hosted in September 2001. The stadium's natural-grass surface has been criticized throughout its history, but Steelers owners have kept the grass after lobbying from players and coaches. The 68,400-seat stadium has sold out for most Steelers home games, a streak that dates to 1972. A collection of Steelers and Panthers memorabilia is in the Great Hall.

The stadium has hosted two outdoor hockey games: the 2011 NHL Winter Classic between the Pittsburgh Penguins and Washington Capitals, and the 2017 NHL Stadium Series game between the Penguins and Philadelphia Flyers. The venue has also hosted numerous concerts; on June 17, 2023, Taylor Swift's The Eras Tour performance was attended by 73,117 people, the highest-ticketed event in Pittsburgh history.

== History ==
=== Planning and funding ===
The Pittsburgh Steelers and Pittsburgh Pirates shared Three Rivers Stadium from 1970 to 2000. After discussions over the Pirates building a full-time baseball park, a proposal was made to renovate Three Rivers Stadium into a full-time football facility. Although the Steelers' owners disliked the idea, the proposal was used as a "fallback position" that would be used if discussions for a new stadium failed. The Steelers' owners said failing to build a new stadium would hurt the franchise's chances of signing players who might sign with other teams, such as the other three teams in the AFC North, who had all recently built new football-only stadiums. In June 2001, the H. J. Heinz Company purchased the naming rights to the stadium. Per the deal, Heinz would pay the Steelers a total of $57 million through 2021, the "57" being an intentional reference to Heinz 57. Despite Heinz later announcing its acquisition of Kraft Foods Group to form Kraft Heinz Company in 2015, the stadium's name was retained.

Originally, a sales tax increase was proposed to fund three projects: Heinz Field, PNC Park, and an expansion of the David L. Lawrence Convention Center. After the rejection of this proposal in a 1997 referendum known as the "Regional Renaissance Initiative", the city developed the alternate funding proposal Plan B. Similarly controversial, the proposal was labeled Scam B by opponents. The Steelers' pledge toward the new stadium was criticized for being too little, even after it was raised from $50 million to $76.5 million. Other local government members criticized the $281 million of public money allocated for Plan B. One member of the Allegheny Regional Asset District board called the use of tax dollars "corporate welfare". The plan, totaling $809 million, was approved by the Allegheny Regional Asset District board on July 9, 1998, with $233 million allotted for Heinz Field. Shortly after Plan B was approved, the Steelers made a deal with Pittsburgh city officials to stay in the city until at least 2031. The total cost of Heinz Field was $281 million.

=== Design and construction ===
Former Heinz Field logo; the stadium changed its name in 2022

HOK Sport designed the stadium. HOK Sport's project manager for the project, Melinda Lehman, said that the Rooney family asked for the stadium's design to "acknowledge the history of Pittsburgh and also bring in an element of looking forward, this is where Pittsburgh is going." In order to accomplish this, HOK Sport used steel structurally and externally. The stone used in Acrisure Stadium's design is artificial, in order to decrease cost. Of the glass used in the stadium's design, Lehman said, "The glass is a more modern building element, which ties into a lot of the buildings in [Downtown] Pittsburgh and gives great views of the surrounding areas." The Steelers and Panthers have their own locker rooms, which differ in size based on the number of players each team is permitted to dress for each game. The visitor facilities are modeled after the home locker rooms' design. As with its predecessor, Acrisure Stadium's culinary service provider is Aramark; over 400 eateries are located throughout the stadium. A bronze statue of Steelers founder Art Rooney, similar to those located outside PNC Park, was moved 100 feet (30 m) from its previous position outside Three Rivers Stadium. In addition, a statue of a Pitt Panther over a paved depiction of Pitt's Cathedral of Learning was placed outside Gate A. Upon opening in 2001, Heinz Field's 27 by 96 foot (8.2 by 29.3 m) Sony JumboTron was the largest scoreboard in the NFL. In 2007, ESPN named the "tipping" of the oversized Heinz ketchup bottles atop the scoreboard one of the top ten touchdown celebrations in the NFL.

Ground was broken for Heinz Field on June 18, 1999, at a ceremony co-hosted by the Steelers and the University of Pittsburgh. The stadium was constructed by Hunt Construction Group and Mascaro Construction Company, LP. The two companies directed 1,400 workers over two years, in which there were no construction accidents or lawsuits. The stadium is inspected yearly, along with PNC Park, by Chronicle Consulting, LLC, for structural defects and maintenance.

Unusual for a stadium built in the 21st century (but much more common among older stadiums), the stadium originally had trough-style urinals in the men's restroom, leading to a lack of privacy during bathroom breaks. In 2023, the trough urinals were replaced with more conventional individual urinals with privacy dividers.

=== Opening ===
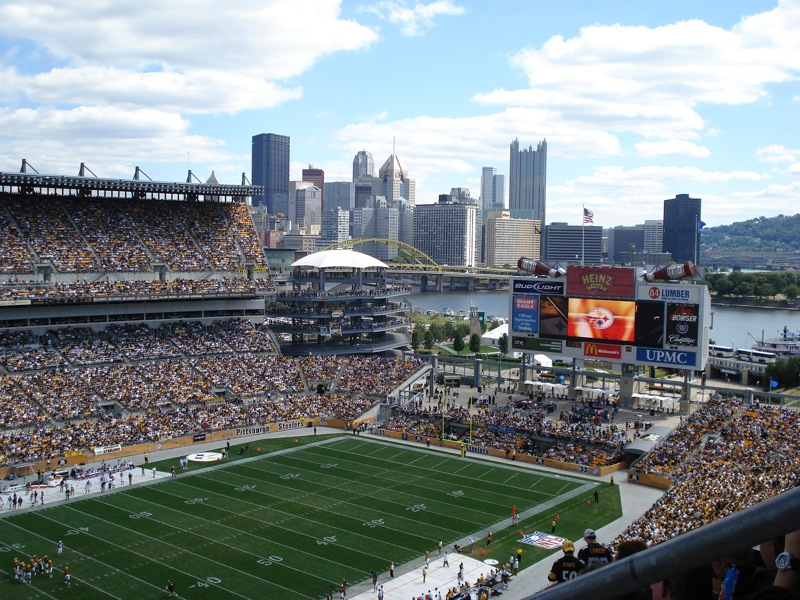
Heinz Field with downtown Pittsburgh in the background, September 2007

The first event held at Heinz Field was a concert hosted by 'N Sync on August 18, 2001. Coincidentally, they were also the last band to perform at the Steelers' previous home, Three Rivers Stadium. Before the Steelers' regular season, the team played a pre-season game against the Detroit Lions on August 25, 2001. Pittsburgh won the stadium's unofficial opening game 20–7, before 57,829 spectators. The first official football game played in the stadium was between the Pittsburgh Panthers and East Tennessee State, on September 1. The Panthers won the game 31–0, with quarterback David Priestley scoring the first touchdown on an 85-yard run. The Steelers were scheduled to open the regular season play at Heinz Field on September 16 against the Cleveland Browns; however, due to the September 11 attacks, all NFL games of the week were postponed, thus moving the stadium's premiere to October 7, against the Cincinnati Bengals. Prior to the game, a speech from US President George W. Bush, ordering attacks on Taliban-controlled Afghanistan, was shown live on the stadium's JumboTron. The speech was met with much applause and support from the spectators in attendance. Pittsburgh defeated the Bengals, 16–7. Steelers kicker Kris Brown scored the first NFL points in the stadium on a 26-yard field goal, and quarterback Kordell Stewart scored the first touchdown on an eight-yard run.

That same year, two light-emitting diode (LED) video displays from Daktronics were installed at the field. The larger, HD video display measures approximately 28 feet (8.5 m) high by nearly 96 feet (29 m) wide.

In 2007, writer Bill Evans named Heinz Field the second best stadium in the NFL, behind Lambeau Field, in an article for ESPN.com. Although both stadiums received a score of 54 out of 70, Sports Illustrated named Heinz Field the second best stadium in the NFL, also behind Lambeau Field.

=== Future ===
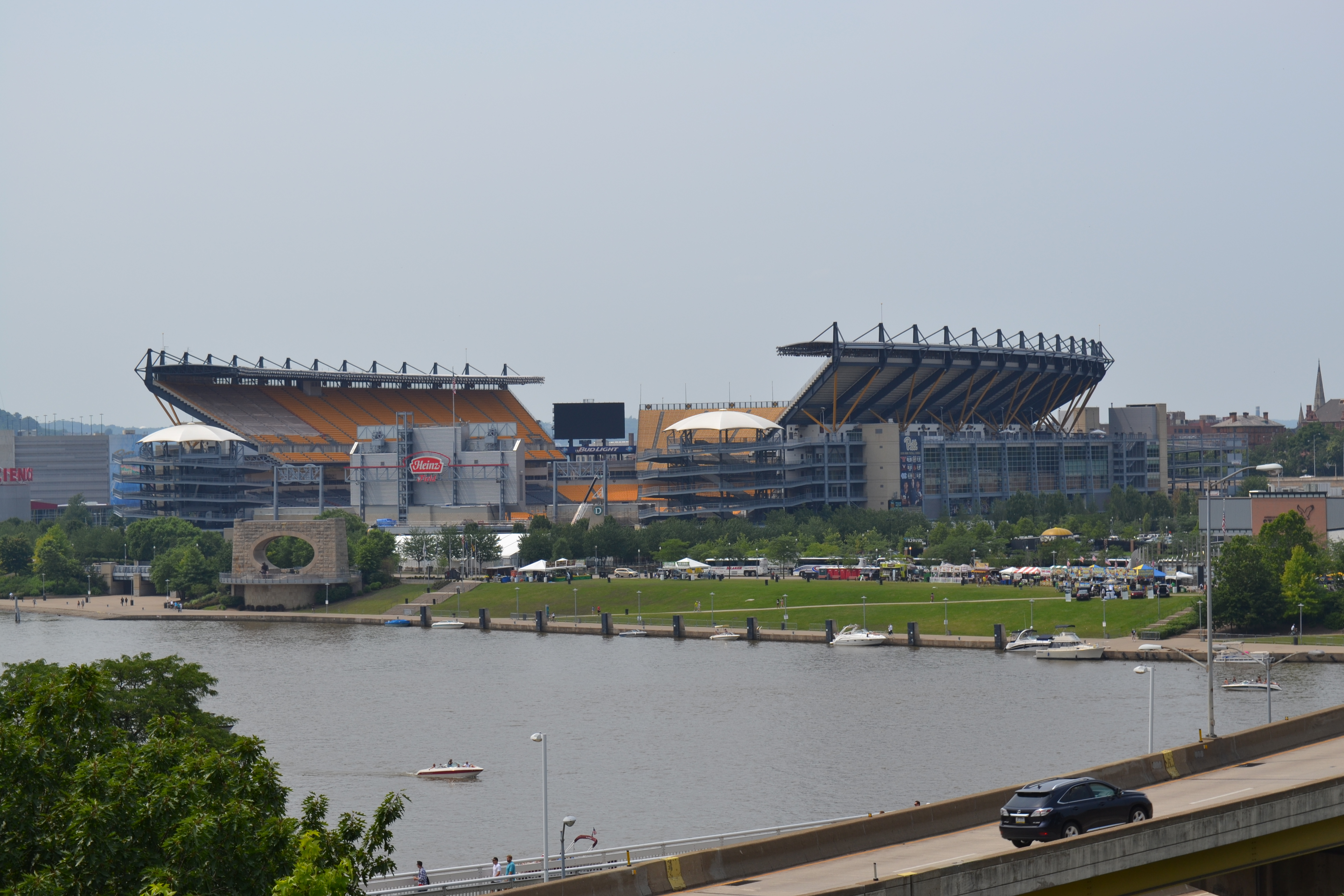
A view of Heinz Field from across the river, July 2015

While the Steelers continue to make capital improvements to Acrisure Stadium as well as expand seating, some fans of the Pitt Panthers football team have called for the university to build an on-campus stadium. However, the university has never included such plans in any long-term facilities or strategic planning. While there has been talk of extending the Pittsburgh Light Rail to Oakland, significant costs were cited during construction of the North Shore Connector, which terminates at Acrisure Stadium. While the possibility of moving games back on campus with a purpose-built stadium has not been entirely dismissed by the university administration, it has also not been endorsed or featured in any strategic planning.

In January 2021, just as the Heinz naming rights deal was set to expire, it was announced that Kraft-Heinz decided to renew the naming rights for just one more year, ensuring the name would remain through at least the end of 2021. As the naming rights were allowed to expire in 2022, the future name of the stadium was uncertain. However, Steelers president Art Rooney II has said he was "optimistic" about agreeing to another extension with Kraft-Heinz.

However, on July 10, 2022, it was reported that Heinz would not sign a new deal with the Steelers, ending their 21-year business arrangement. After unsuccessfully trying to find another local company to purchase the naming rights, the naming rights were bought by Michigan-based insurance company Acrisure in a deal initially reported on July 11, 2022; Steelers minority owner Thomas Tull also has an ownership stake in Acrisure. The decision to rename the stadium has received overwhelmingly fierce opposition by Steelers fans.

However, Kraft-Heinz did not remain outside of Steelers-named sponsorship for much longer after giving up naming rights to the stadium itself; the company renegotiated with the Steelers to instead be the naming sponsor for Gate C, the closest gate to the Allegheny Light Rail station. Kraft Heinz later repurposed the Heinz Field name for the new football stadium for Aliquippa Junior/Senior High School in suburban Aliquippa, Pennsylvania as part of a $1.3 million endowment to the Aliquippa School District for new academic and athletic centers.

== Notable events ==
In addition to football games, Acrisure Stadium has hosted other various activities.

=== Football ===
On August 4, 2012, Heinz Field hosted the Women's Football Alliance's National Championship Game, becoming the first NFL stadium to host a title game for any women's football league.

The quickest score in NFL history occurred on September 8, 2013, in the Steelers season opener against the Tennessee Titans, when the Steelers scored a safety on the opening kickoff three seconds into the game. Darius Reynaud of the Titans fielded the kickoff and took a short step backwards (into the south end zone) for what was ruled to be a safety, not a touchback, because the ball was not in the end zone when it was fielded. The Steelers, however, lost the game 16–9, which was also their first home opener loss since the stadium opened.

On October 7, 2018, the Steelers won their 100th regular season game at Heinz Field with a record of 100–38–1 at that point.

College football

Since the Panthers moved to the stadium, attendance for games has been varied, ranging from an average high of 59,197 people per game for the 2003 season to a low of 33,315 in 2007. Speculation and analysis mostly concluded that that attendance was primarily impacted by the success of the team and times that the games are played, not the location of the stadium. More recently, Pitt has averaged 54,710 in home attendance during the 2022 season in which the team posted a 9-4 record and 48,122 during the 2023 season in which the team recorded a 3-9 season.

On September 1, 2022, the Backyard Brawl between the University of Pittsburgh and West Virginia University met after an 11-year break of the rivalry, due to conference realignment. With an attendance of 70,622 fans, a new record was set for the largest sporting event in the history of Pittsburgh. The previous record was held by Penn State versus Pitt in 2016 with 69,983 in attendance.

=== Concerts ===
Since its opening in 2001, bands and artists including NSYNC, Beyoncé, Taylor Swift, Kenny Chesney, and LeAnn Rimes have performed at the stadium. Additionally, hometown bands The Clarks, the Povertyneck Hillbillies, and the Pittsburgh Comma have played multiple shows at the stadium.

Date	Artist	Opening act(s)	Tour / Concert name	Attendance	Revenue	Notes
August 18, 2001	NSYNC	Amanda; Deborah Gibson; Christina Milian; Lil' Johnny	PopOdyssey Tour	48,118 / 56,275	$2,558,856	
July 30, 2005	Kenny Chesney	Gretchen Wilson; Uncle Kracker; Pat Green	Somewhere in the Sun Tour	53,133 / 54,133	$3,416,682	
July 23, 2006	Bon Jovi	Nickelback	Have a Nice Day Tour	—	—	
June 9, 2007	Kenny Chesney	Brooks & Dunn; Sugarland	Flip-Flop Summer Tour	54,372 / 54,372	$4,462,709	
June 14, 2008	Kenny Chesney	Keith Urban; LeAnn Rimes; Gary Allan; Luke Bryan; Sammy Hagar	The Poets and Pirates Tour	45,770 / 50,136	$4,088,667	
June 6, 2009	Kenny Chesney	Lady Antebellum; Miranda Lambert; Sugarland; Montgomery Gentry	Sun City Carnival Tour	47,510 / 49,103	$4,106,495	
June 18, 2011	Taylor Swift	Needtobreathe; Randy Montana; Danny Gokey	Speak Now World Tour	52,009 / 52,009	$4,009,118	
July 2, 2011	Kenny Chesney; Eric Church	Billy Currington; Uncle Kracker	Goin' Coastal Tour	53,753 / 53,753	$4,604,884	
July 26, 2011	U2	Interpol	U2 360° Tour	55,823 / 55,823	$5,050,730	
June 30, 2012	Kenny Chesney; Tim McGraw	Grace Potter and the Nocturnals; Jake Owen	Brothers of the Sun Tour	53,325 / 57,452	$4,841,193	
June 22, 2013	Kenny Chesney; Eric Church	Eli Young Band; Kacey Musgraves	No Shoes Nation Tour	49,043 / 51,186	$3,693,793	
July 6, 2013	Taylor Swift	Ed Sheeran; Austin Mahone; Joel Crouse	The Red Tour	56,047 / 56,047	$4,718,518	
June 21, 2014	Luke Bryan; Dierks Bentley	Lee Brice; Cole Swindell; DJ Rock; Chris Young; Chase Rice; Jon Pardi; Cassadee Pope	That's My Kind of Night Tour; Riser Tour	52,621 / 52,621	$3,173,249	
May 30, 2015	Kenny Chesney; Eric Church	Brantley Gilbert; Chase Rice	The Big Revival Tour			
June 6, 2015	Taylor Swift	Vance Joy; Shawn Mendes	The 1989 World Tour	54,801 / 54,801	$5,836,926	Little Big Town was a special guest.
June 20, 2015	The Rolling Stones	Awolnation	Zip Code Tour	54,136 / 54,136	$9,125,120	
August 2, 2015	One Direction	Icona Pop	On the Road Again Tour	29,323 / 29,323	$2,527,609	
May 31, 2016	Beyoncé	Jermaine Dupri	The Formation World Tour	36,325 / 36,325	$3,927,805	First Black artist to headline at the stadium.
July 2, 2016	Kenny Chesney	Miranda Lambert; Sam Hunt; Old Dominion	Spread the Love Tour	47,111 / 48,577	$3,495,589	
July 12, 2016	Guns N' Roses	Wolfmother	Not in This Lifetime ... Tour	39,109 / 42,109	$3,810,026	
June 7, 2017	U2	The Lumineers	The Joshua Tree Tour 2017	41,413 / 41,413	$4,273,920	
June 2, 2018	Kenny Chesney	Thomas Rhett; Old Dominion	The Trip Around the Sun Tour	48,856 / 50,405	$4,603,691	
June 30, 2018	Luke Bryan	Sam Hunt; Jon Pardi; Morgan Wallen	What Makes You Country Tour	TBA	TBA	
August 7, 2018	Taylor Swift	Camila Cabello; Charli XCX	Taylor Swift's Reputation Stadium Tour	56,445 / 56,445	$6,230,876	
May 18, 2019	Garth Brooks	Midland	The Garth Brooks Stadium Tour	—	$6,277,500	
October 4, 2021	The Rolling Stones	Ghosthounds	No Filter Tour	43,702 / 43,702	$8,781,607	
June 16, 2023	Taylor Swift	Girl in Red; Gracie Abrams	The Eras Tour	TBA	TBA	First act in history to sell out two shows on a single tour. Highest-ticketed event in Pittsburgh history. (June 17)
June 17, 2023	Taylor Swift	Girl in Red; Owenn	The Eras Tour	TBA	TBA	First act in history to sell out two shows on a single tour. Highest-ticketed event in Pittsburgh history. (June 17)
July 8, 2023	Ed Sheeran	Khalid; Rosa Linn	+–=÷× Tour	67,829 / 67,829	$5,823,055	
June 1, 2024	Kenny Chesney; Zac Brown Band	Megan Moroney; Uncle Kracker	Sun Goes Down 2024 Tour			
May 8, 2025	AC/DC	The Pretty Reckless	Power Up Tour			
May 31, 2025	George Strait; Chris Stapleton	Parker McCollum				
June 5, 2026	Morgan Wallen	Brooks & Dunn; Gavin Adcock; Zach John King	Still The Problem Tour			
June 6, 2026	Morgan Wallen	Ella Langley; Gavin Adcock; Zach John King	Still The Problem Tour			
August 29, 2026	Bruno Mars	DJ Pee .Wee & Raye	The Romantic Tour			

=== Soccer ===
On July 27, 2014, Heinz Field hosted a soccer match between A.C. Milan and Manchester City which was part of the 2014 International Champions Cup and Manchester City won the match 5–1.

Heinz Field hosted a women's international exhibition match between the United States and Costa Rica on August 16, 2015. It ended in an 8–0 victory for the United States, in their first match since winning the 2015 FIFA Women's World Cup, and set a new attendance record for a standalone women's friendly in the U.S. with 44,028 spectators.

Date	Winning Team	Result	Losing Team	Tournament	Spectators
September 29, 2004	United States women	3–0	Iceland women	Women's International Friendly	6,386
July 27, 2014	(England) Manchester City	5–1	(Italy) A.C. Milan	2014 International Champions Cup	34,347
August 16, 2015	United States women	8–0	Costa Rica women	Women's International Friendly	44,028
July 25, 2018	(Portugal) Benfica	2–2 (4–3 pen.)	(Germany) Borussia Dortmund	2018 International Champions Cup	16,171
July 26, 2024	(England) Liverpool	1–0	(Spain) Real Betis	Friendly	42,679

=== NHL Winter Classic ===
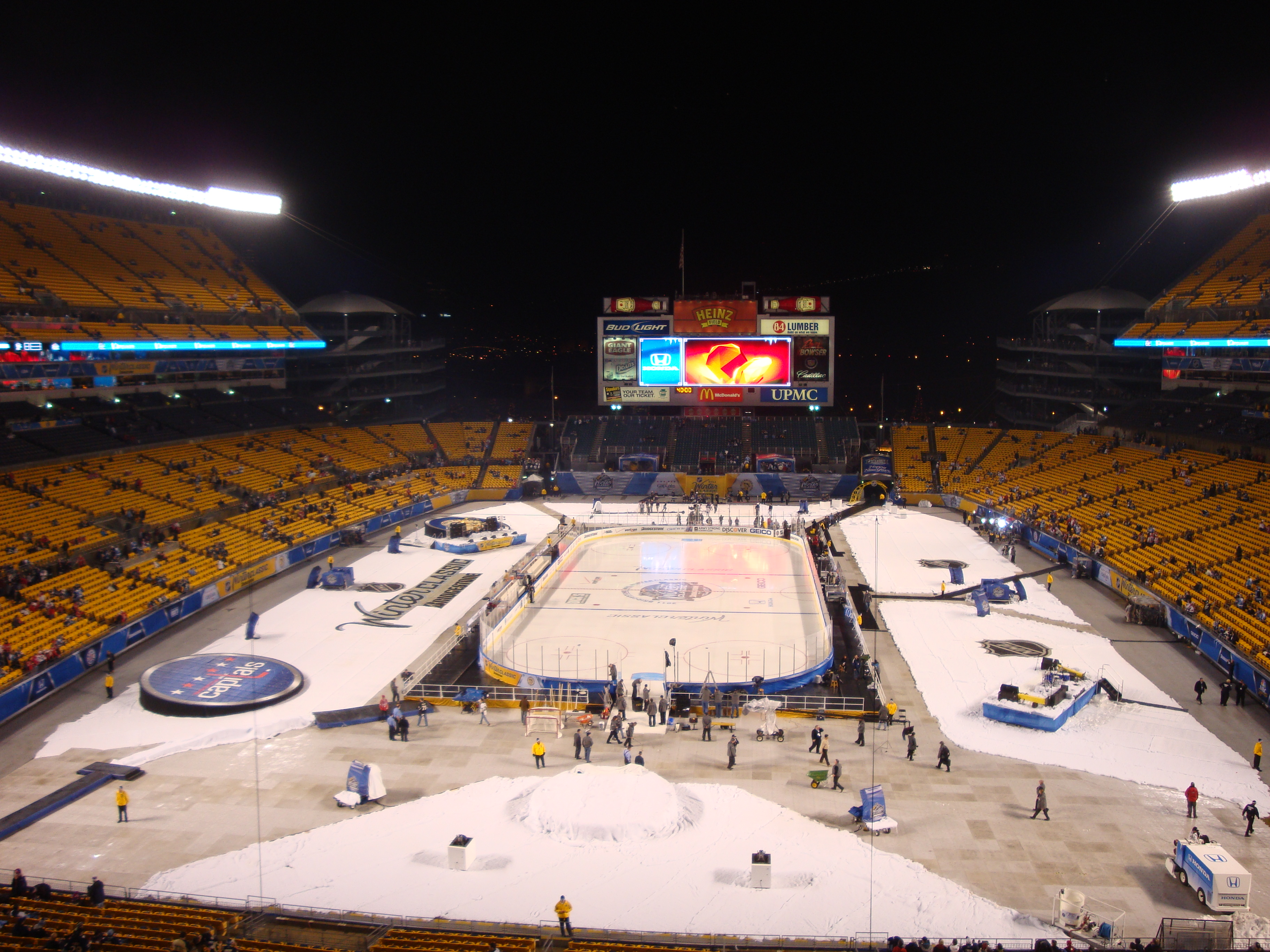
Heinz Field in hockey configuration before the 2011 NHL Winter Classic

On May 28, 2010, National Hockey League commissioner Gary Bettman announced that Heinz Field would be the host of the 2011 NHL Winter Classic. The game was played January 1, 2011, between the Pittsburgh Penguins and Washington Capitals. Pittsburgh native Jackie Evancho sang the Star Spangled Banner before local sports legends Franco Harris, Jerome Bettis, and Mario Lemieux dropped the ceremonial puck. The Capitals won, 3–1. The game was the highest rated NHL contest since 1996 and the highest rated regular season game since 1975. It was also the first night Classic and the first to use "CableCam" technology.

Date	Winning Team	Result	Losing Team	Event	Spectators
January 1, 2011	Washington Capitals	3–1	Pittsburgh Penguins	2011 NHL Winter Classic	68,111
February 25, 2017	Pittsburgh Penguins	4–2	Philadelphia Flyers	2017 NHL Stadium Series	67,318

=== In film & TV ===
Pittsburgh was one of six cities chosen for the 2011 American Idol auditions. Signups occurred at Heinz Field on July 12–13 and auditions occurred on July 15, 2011.

Heinz Field was the home field for the Gotham Rogues in the 2012 film The Dark Knight Rises. An estimated 15,000 unpaid extras filled the stadium during shooting on August 6, 2011.

During episode 4 of season 12 of The Bachelorette, eleven contestants competed in a five-on-five football game. In addition, they met with football players from the Steelers including Ben Roethlisberger, Hines Ward, and Brett Keisel.

=== Other events ===
In 2002, the Pittsburgh Marathon ended at Heinz Field; the course was altered from past years allowing competitors to cross the finish line on the field. In 2005, the Pittsburgh Wine Festival was held at Heinz Field and over 2,000 people attended.

In 2021, Pittsburgh CLO presented a production of The Wizard of Oz from July 8 to 10 on the field. In 2024, President Donald Trump visited the stadium for a Steelers game during his presidential campaign.

In 2025, the stadium hosted Supercross for the first time ever, as well as Monster Jam.

== Features ==
=== Playing surface ===
In June 2001, Kentucky Bluegrass was laid on the field, at half the height of most NFL field's 2-inch (51 mm) grass. The field is heated from below, using a mixture of antifreeze and hot water, to keep the field at around 62 °F (17 °C) in order to keep the grass growing year-round. The field was re-surfaced multiple times, until the synthetic-enhanced Desso GrassMaster was installed in 2003. Debate continued over the surface after players began slipping during game play. Despite this, players and coaches of Pitt, the Steelers, and their opponents supported keeping the current turf.

I need the grass. I like the mud. I like the sloppiness, I'm used to it. Mr. Rooney, can we please keep the grass? I don't want no FieldTurf. It's bad on your knees.

— Ike Taylor

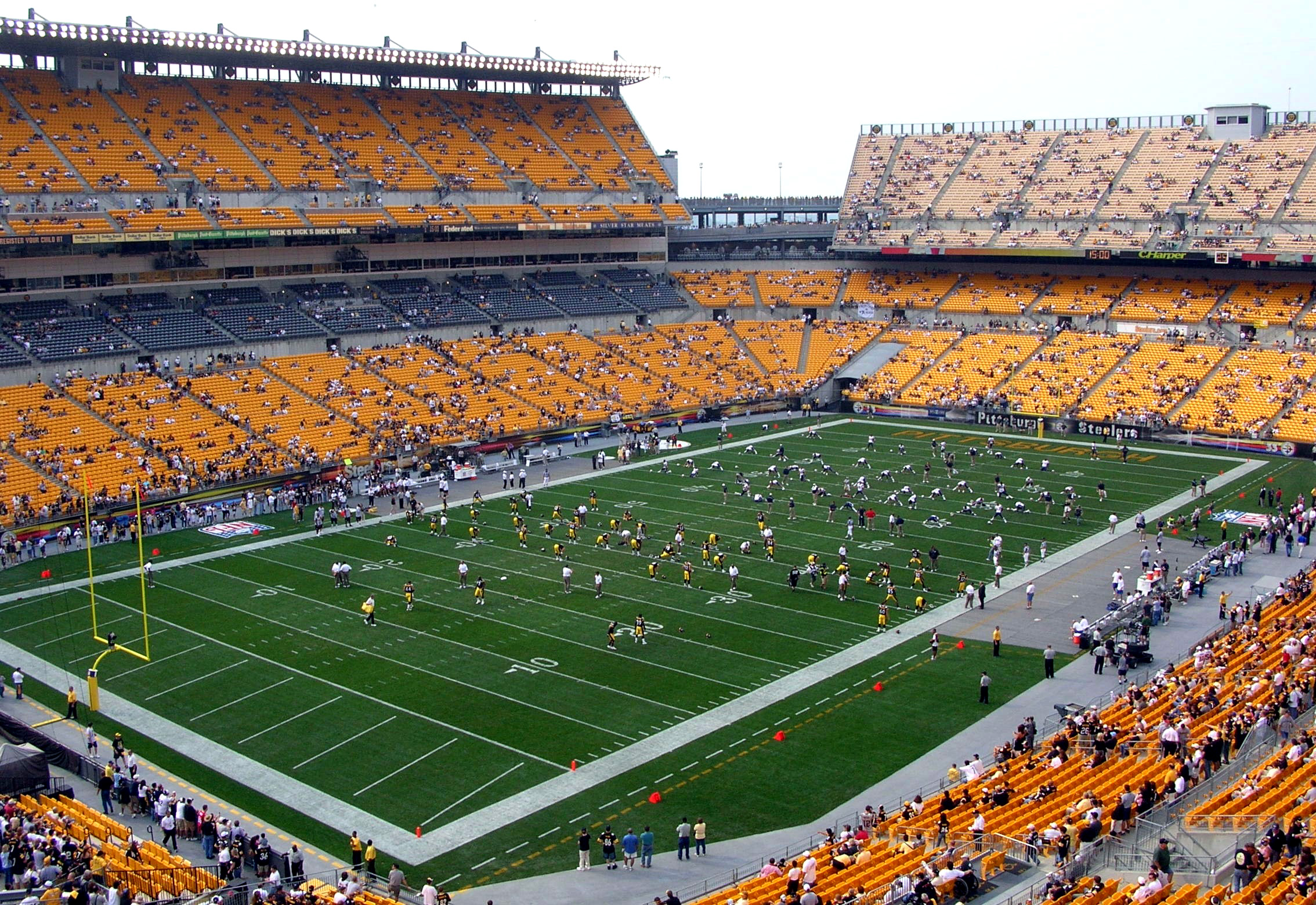
Heinz Field before a Pittsburgh Steelers-New England Patriots game, September 2005

On Friday, November 23, 2007, Heinz Field hosted four WPIAL championship football games which were followed the day after with a game between Pitt and South Florida. After discussion with the NFL, the Steelers owners decided to re-surface the field for their nationally televised game against the Miami Dolphins. A layer of sod was laid on the 2.5-acre (1.0 ha) GrassMaster surface. After the new sod was laid, 1½ inches of rain fell which did not allow the tarp to be removed from the field until 70 minutes before the game began. The field conditions were so bad that a punt by Dolphins punter Brandon Fields stuck to the turf without bouncing. The Steelers won the game 3–0, with a field goal by Jeff Reed with 17 seconds remaining; it was the NFL's first 3–0 game since 1993 and the longest two teams went without scoring since the New York Giants and Detroit Lions played to a scoreless tie on November 11, 1943. Scott Brown, of the Pittsburgh Tribune-Review, called the field a "veritable mud pit". Gene Upshaw, head of the National Football League Players' Association, said a 2006 survey of NFL players ranked Heinz Field as the second-worst field in the league. Steelers receiver Hines Ward called the playing conditions "horrendous" after the game. However, the following day Ward and other Pittsburgh players lobbied to keep the natural surface, saying, "I think everybody wants to keep the grass." Since that season, the Steelers have played their game on the weekend after Thanksgiving on the road at the team's request.

Debate continued over the field later in the season when Jacksonville running back Fred Taylor called the field "a lawsuit pending". Pittsburgh's owners said the decision was up to the players, who once again defended the natural surface. In February 2008, the Steelers announced that they would keep the Desso GrassMaster surface. During the 2008 season, quarterback Ben Roethlisberger received a concussion from a hit at Heinz Field. He later said, "I'm glad we weren't on FieldTurf. That grass — you know, the soft Heinz Field—might've helped a little bit." After the 2008 season, a poll of 1,565 NFL players rated the surface at Heinz Field as the worst of the 18 natural surfaces in the League.

The Grassmaster surface was removed in January 2009 and replaced with the old sod placed on top of the Grassmaster surface for the AFC Championship later that month.

In 2026 it was decided to no longer use Kentucky bluegrass as the playing surface and switch to Tahoma 31 Bermudagrass amid rising concerns of player safety and field conditions. Since the playing surface was shared between WPIAL Football, Pitt Panthers, as well as the Pittsburgh Steelers and degraded during the course of the season. During the annual off-season NFLPA report card the Kentucky bluegrass surface received a grade of F-. This new surface is the same surface the Philadelphia Eagles play on at Lincoln Financial Field, who share their field with Temple. Who during that same report card received an A+ for their playing surface.

=== Field design ===
When the venue opened in 2001, both end zones were painted athletic gold during Steelers home games (this also happened for the final five seasons at Three Rivers Stadium), with "PITTSBURGH" on the north side and "Steelers" on the south side; both words were painted black with white outlines. Either "Steelers" or "Panthers" was painted in the end zone, depending on the game, during the first three years. For the 2002 Steelers regular season, the area covered by gold paint was reduced to just around the words. The design for the 2002 Wild Card matchup replaced the white letter outlines with athletic gold paint and removed it everywhere else.

In 2003, the Steelers played the Philadelphia Eagles in a preseason game with plain diagonal white lines in the South end zone, which were common in NFL end zones until the 1960s. Although the Steelers lost the game 21–16, team president Dan Rooney liked the look of the South end zone being "plain", and decided to bring it back the next year. The 2003 season was the last year to date which contained "PITTSBURGH" and "Steelers" in black words with athletic gold outlines in both end zones.

Beginning in 2004, the wordmark designs were flipped in paint color, "PITTSBURGH" in the North and "Steelers" in the South were now athletic gold with the former having either dark blue outlines for Pitt or black for the Steelers. The diagonal white lines in the South end zone during the college portion of the season began in this year too, with "Steelers" being added after Pitt has played their final home game of the year. In the aforementioned Dolphins-Steelers Monday Night Football match of 2007, the surface conditions had become so deteriorated from the rain and gameplay itself that the field grid of hash marks, yard lines, mid-field logo, and wordmarks in both end zones were barely visible throughout the game. Sideline hash marks (painted orange) and yard lines were re-painted at halftime.

From 2001 through 2010, there was typically no midfield logo when both Pitt and the Steelers were in season; the Steelers had their logo painted on the sidelines when Pitt's football season was ongoing and transferred it to midfield after Pitt's football season ended (except for the first two seasons when it was only added for the postseason). As of the 2011 season, Pitt and the Steelers in cooperation have their respective logos at midfield for their own homes games, being interchanged frequently.

Being a member of the American Football Conference (AFC), the grounds crew of Acrisure Stadium has painted the conference logo in both end zones for every Pittsburgh Steelers postseason home game to date. Recently, after the end of the Pittsburgh Panthers season, fans and players, including T. J. Watt and J. J. Watt, spoke out to change the endzones to the gold ones, similar to the one at Three Rivers Stadium.

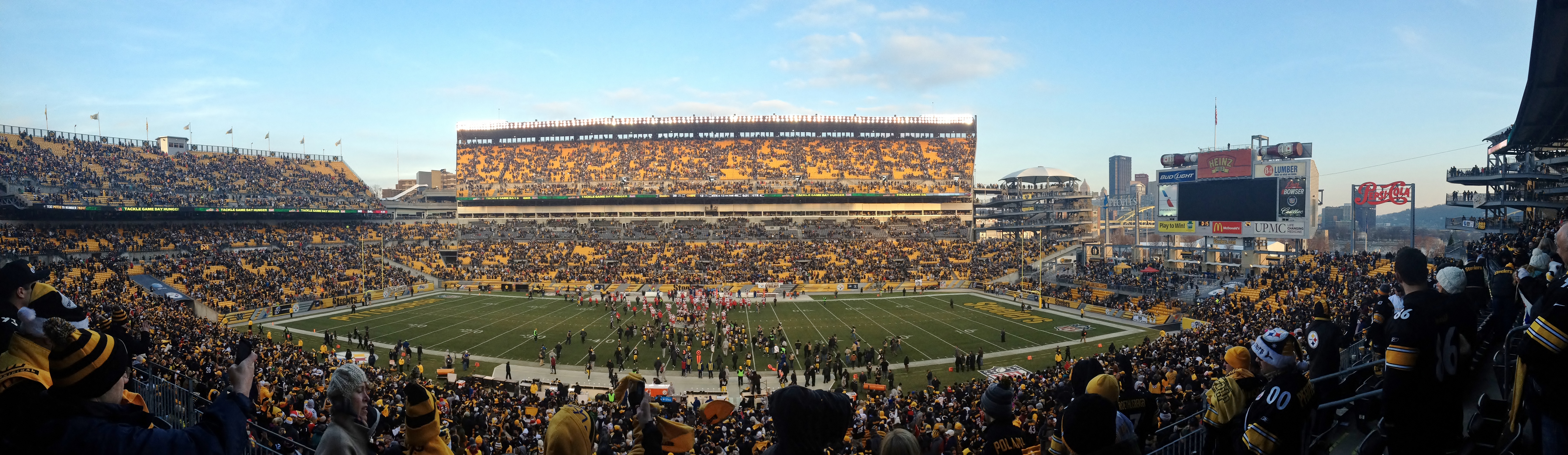
Panorama of Heinz Field from club seating during the Steelers vs. Chiefs post-game in December 2014; note the "Steelers" painted in the south endzone, added after the college football season

=== Seating and tickets ===
As of 2018, the Pittsburgh Steelers have sold out every home game since the 1972 season. Entering the 2008 season, the Steelers average ticket price of $69.47 was the 15th highest out of the NFL's 32 teams. The majority of the 65,050 seats are colored "Steeler gold", though club seats are dark gray. Acrisure Stadium features 1,500 seats in 129 luxury boxes, with prices ranging from $64,000 to $135,000 depending on location and size. These boxes were predicted to increase the Steelers' profits from $10 to $11 million per season over those at Three Rivers Stadium. The stadium also features 6,600 club seats that include a restaurant and an indoor bar, at prices up to $2,000 per person. For the 2010 season, season ticket prices for Panthers games ranged from a maximum of $295 per club seat with required donations per seat between $250 and $500 depending on location, to as low as $87 per seat with no required donation for upper end zone sections. Individual game ticket prices ranged from $30 to $65 depending on the seat location and the opponent.

=== Great Hall ===
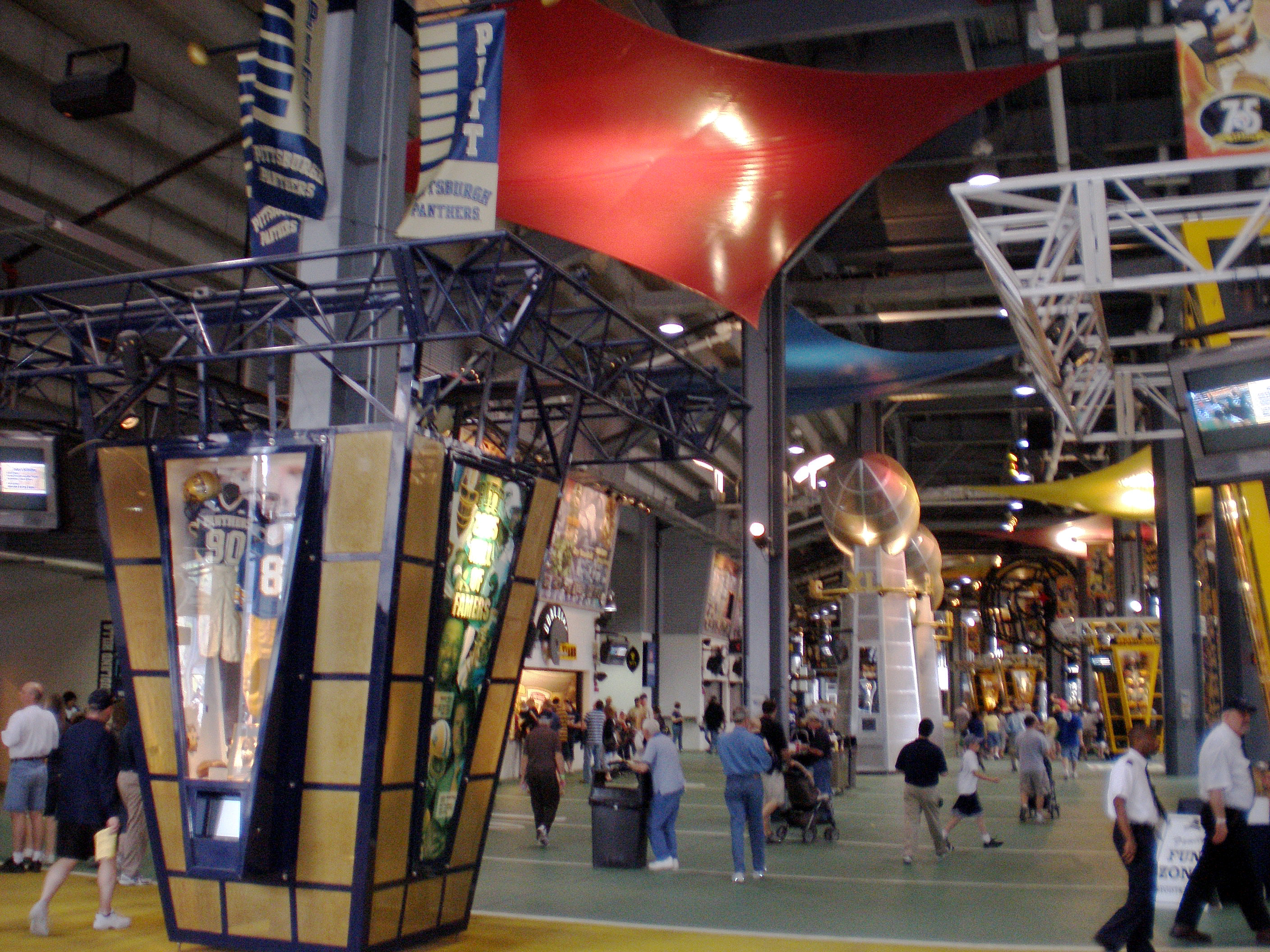
The Great Hall, April 2008

The Great Hall spans approximately 40,000 square feet (3,700 m^{2}) on the east side of the stadium and houses a collection of Steelers and Pittsburgh Panthers memorabilia. The Hall includes a timeline of the Steelers franchise's major events and an oversized Steelers helmet hanging from the ceiling beside a video screen that shows entertainment for fans throughout game days. The Great Hall also features the actual lockers of several former Steelers, including Hall of Fame members Franco Harris, Joe Greene, and Bill Dudley.

Six large Lombardi Trophy-shaped display columns were erected and contain artifacts from each championship the Steelers have won including replica trophies. Two display columns are dedicated to the University of Pittsburgh and contain memorabilia from the Panthers' teams. The floor is painted to resemble the post-baseball season football field at Three Rivers Stadium, with the word "Steelers" painted in black over a gold background. University of Pittsburgh players are featured on two large murals within the Hall. Eight additional tile murals created by local high schools represent western Pennsylvania football history. In 2007, the Great Hall was named the best concourse at an NFL stadium by writer Bill Evans, in an article for ESPN.com.

== Seating expansion ==
The Steelers notified the Pittsburgh Stadium Authority in December 2010 of their intention to add up to 4,000 seats to the lower southern end of the stadium. The plan would increase seating up to 69,050 as soon as the 2012 NFL season. Seating was added in that section for the 2011 NHL Winter Classic, which had an attendance of 68,111. The temporary seating was left in place for the 2010–11 NFL playoffs, with the AFC Championship game on January 23 having a record attendance of 66,662.

On April 12, 2012, the Steelers confirmed they would seek approval from the NFL to expand seating by 3,000. On May 19, 2014, after more than two years, the Steelers and the SEA came to an agreement to add about 3,000 seats to the venue. After contractors surveyed the complex the final number of 2,390 added seats with five additional suites including more parking, restrooms and concessions was determined in December 2014 to increase capacity to a total of 68,400. The seating was put in place by the summer of 2015.

On September 10, 2016, the then-largest crowd of 69,983 to ever see a sporting event in Pittsburgh watched the Pitt Panthers defeat the Penn State Nittany Lions, 42–39 as they renewed their rivalry in football. On September 1, 2022, a crowd of 70,622 fans broke the record attendance for a sporting event in Pittsburgh again, as No. 17 Pitt defeated the West Virginia Mountaineers 38–31 in the first Backyard Brawl since 2011.

== Transportation access ==
Acrisure Stadium is located at Exit 1B of Interstate 279 within a mile of direct access to both Interstate 376 and Interstate 579. The stadium has dedicated elevated walkway access to the Allegheny Station of the Pittsburgh Light Rail system (the "T"). On Steelers and Pittsburgh Panthers game days, access is also provided from Station Square parking facilities via the Gateway Clipper Fleet.

== See also ==
- List of U.S. stadiums by capacity
- List of NCAA Division I FBS football stadiums
- List of current National Football League stadiums

Events and tenants
Preceded by Three Rivers Stadium	Home of the Pittsburgh Steelers; 2001–present	Succeeded by current
Preceded by Three Rivers Stadium	Home of the Pittsburgh Panthers; 2001–present	Succeeded by current
Preceded by Network Associates Coliseum; Gillette Stadium; Gillette Stadium; Lucas Oil Stadium	Host of AFC Championship Game; 2002; 2005; 2009; 2011	Succeeded by Network Associates Coliseum; Invesco Field at Mile High; Lucas Oil Stadium; Gillette Stadium
Preceded by Fenway Park	Host of the NHL Winter Classic; 2011	Succeeded by Citizens Bank Park
Preceded by TCF Bank Stadium & Coors Field	Host of the NHL Stadium Series; 2017	Succeeded by Navy–Marine Corps Memorial Stadium
