= The Woman with You =

Single by Kenny Chesney

from the album When the Sun Goes Down
- Released: August 31, 2004
- Recorded: 2004
- Genre: Country
- Length: 4:31 (album version); 3:45 (single version)
- Label: BNA
- Songwriters: Craig Wiseman; David Frasier
- Producers: Buddy Cannon; Kenny Chesney

Kenny Chesney singles chronology
"Hey, Good Lookin'" (2004)	"The Woman with You" (2004)	"Anything but Mine" (2005)

"The Woman with You" is a song written by David Frasier and Craig Wiseman and recorded by American country music artist Kenny Chesney. It was released in August 2004 as the fourth single from Chesney’s 2004 album When the Sun Goes Down. The song peaked at number 2 on the U.S. Billboard Hot Country Singles & Tracks chart in 2004.

== Content ==
The narrator's wife reflects on her dreams of making it big in the corporate world while in reality she works menial jobs with little appreciation. She then tells him that "it sure is nice to just be the woman with you".

== Chart positions ==
"The Woman with You" debuted at number 54 on the U.S. Billboard Hot Country Songs chart for the week of September 4, 2004.

Chart (2004)	Peak position
Canada Country (Radio & Records)	2
US Hot Country Songs (Billboard)	2
US Billboard Hot 100	33
