= When the Sun Goes Down (Kenny Chesney album) =

Studio album by Kenny Chesney
- Released: February 3, 2004
- Recorded: 2003–04
- Studios: Emerald Sound (Nashville, Tennessee); Starstruck (Nashville, Tennessee); Westwood
- Genre: Country
- Length: 45:13
- Label: BNA Records
- Producers: Buddy Cannon; Kenny Chesney

Kenny Chesney chronology
All I Want for Christmas Is a Real Good Tan (2003)	When the Sun Goes Down (2004)	Be as You Are (Songs from an Old Blue Chair) (2005)

Singles from When the Sun Goes Down
- 1. "There Goes My Life" Released: October 20, 2003; 2. "When the Sun Goes Down" Released: February 2, 2004; 3. "I Go Back" Released: May 3, 2004; 4. "The Woman with You" Released: August 31, 2004; 5. "Anything but Mine" Released: January 3, 2005; 6. "Keg in the Closet" Released: May 9, 2005

Professional ratings
Aggregate scores
Source	Rating
Metacritic	(67/100)
Review scores
Source	Rating
About.com	5/5 stars
Allmusic	4.5/5 stars
BBC Music	(positive)
Billboard	(positive)
Blender	1.5/5 stars
Chicago Tribune	(unfavorable)
Entertainment Weekly	C+
Los Angeles Times	3/4 stars
Robert Christgau	(dud)
Rolling Stone	3/5 stars

When the Sun Goes Down is the eighth studio album by American country music artist Kenny Chesney. It was released on February 3, 2004, by BNA Records. The album debuted at number one on the US Billboard 200 chart, selling over 550,000 copies in its first week.

The album produced six singles with "There Goes My Life", the title track (a duet with Uncle Kracker), "I Go Back", "The Woman with You", "Anything but Mine", and "Keg in the Closet" all of which charted in the Top 10 on the US Billboard Hot Country Songs chart. "There Goes My Life", the title track, and "Anything but Mine" all reached number one, "I Go Back" and "The Woman with You" both peaked at number 2, and "Keg in the Closet" went to number 6. The title track is also Uncle Kracker's first country chart entry.

Also included on this album is the song "Some People Change", which was later recorded by American country music duo Montgomery Gentry as the title track to their 2006 album of the same name. Their version was released as a single and became a Top 10 hit for them that year.

The record won Album of the Year at the 2004 Country Music Association Awards.

== Track listing ==
No.	Title	Writer(s)	Length
1.	"There Goes My Life"	Neil Thrasher; Wendell Mobley	5:02
2.	"I Go Back"	Kenny Chesney	4:03
3.	"When the Sun Goes Down" (duet with Uncle Kracker)	Brett James	4:50
4.	"The Woman with You"	Craig Wiseman; David Frasier	4:31
5.	"Some People Change"	Thrasher; Jason Sellers; Michael Dulaney	3:27
6.	"Anything but Mine"	Scooter Carusoe	5:25
7.	"Keg in the Closet"	Chesney; James	3:32
8.	"When I Think About Leaving"	Tim Johnson; Rory Feek; Paul Overstreet	4:39
9.	"Being Drunk's a Lot Like Loving You"	Skip Ewing; Chesney	3:33
10.	"Outta Here"	Josh Leo	2:47
11.	"Old Blue Chair"	Chesney	3:24
Total length:			45:13

Limited Edition tracks
No.	Title	Length
12.	"Live Those Songs" (live)	4:09
13.	"What I Need to Do" (live)	4:41
14.	"Please Come to Boston" (live)	4:00

Target Edition bonus tracks
No.	Title	Writer(s)	Length
15.	"Marina del Rey"	Dean Dillon; Frank Dycus
16.	"Come Monday"	Jimmy Buffett
17.	"I Wonder Do You Think of Me"	Sanger D. Shafer
18.	"I'm On Fire"	Bruce Springsteen
19.	"I Always Get Lucky with You"	Merle Haggard; Freddy Powers; Gary Church; Tex Whitson

== Personnel ==
As listed in liner notes.

- Eddie Bayers - drums
- Wyatt Beard - background vocals
- Mat Britain - steel drums, percussion
- Pat Buchanan - electric guitar, harmonica
- Melonie Cannon - background vocals
- Kenny Chesney - lead vocals
- J. T. Corenflos - electric guitar
- Chad Cromwell - drums
- Dan Dugmore - steel guitar
- Sonny Garrish - steel guitar
- Rob Hajacos - fiddle
- Tim Hensley - banjo, background vocals
- Wes Hightower - background vocals
- John Hobbs - piano, Hammond B-3 organ
- Dann Huff - electric guitar
- John Jorgenson - electric guitar
- Paul Leim - drums, percussion, finger snaps, tambourine
- B. James Lowry - acoustic guitar, nylon string guitar, bottleneck guitar
- Randy McCormick - piano, Hammond B-3 organ, keyboards, synthesizer
- Clayton Mitchell - electric guitar
- Steve Nathan - Wurlitzer electric piano, Hammond B-3 organ
- Sean Paddock - percussion
- Larry Paxton - bass guitar
- Gary Prim - piano, Wurlitzer electric piano, synthesizer
- Tom Roady - steel drums, percussion
- Scotty Sanders - steel guitar
- Neil Thrasher - background vocals
- Uncle Kracker - duet vocals on "When the Sun Goes Down"
- John Willis - electric guitar, acoustic guitar, nylon string guitar

== Charts ==
=== Weekly charts ===
Chart (2004)	Peak position
US Billboard 200	1
US Top Country Albums (Billboard)	1

=== Year-end charts ===
Chart (2004)	Position
US Billboard 200	10
US Top Country Albums (Billboard)	2
Worldwide Albums (IFPI)	20

Chart (2005)	Position
US Billboard 200	57
US Top Country Albums (Billboard)	12

== Certifications ==
Region	Certification	Certified units/sales
United States (RIAA)	5× Platinum	5,000,000^{‡}
^{‡} Sales+streaming figures based on certification alone.
