= Remember When (Alan Jackson song) =

Single by Alan Jackson

from the album Greatest Hits Volume II
- Released: October 27, 2003
- Recorded: 2002–2003
- Genre: Country
- Length: 4:30
- Label: Arista Nashville
- Songwriter: Alan Jackson
- Producer: Keith Stegall

Alan Jackson singles chronology
"It's Five O'Clock Somewhere" (2003)	"Remember When" (2003)	"Hey, Good Lookin'" (2004)

"Remember When" is a song written and recorded by American country music artist Alan Jackson. Released in October 2003 as the second and final single from his compilation album, Greatest Hits Volume II, it spent two weeks at number 1 on the U.S. Billboard Hot Country Songs chart in February 2004 and peaked at number 29 on the Billboard Hot 100. The song has since become one of Jackson's most beloved tracks.

== Content ==
In "Remember When", Jackson looks back on his life with his wife. He describes their love from their first time together, through raising their children, and describes how he and his wife will "remember when" the children were young after they are old.

== Critical reception ==
Billboard called the single "the most poignant, well written country song to hit the format in a long time."

"Remember When" debuted at number 45 on the U.S. Billboard Hot Country Singles & Tracks for the week of November 8, 2003, and reached number one on the chart. The song was certified five-times platinum by the RIAA on August 11, 2026, and has sold 1,571,000 copies in the United States as of November 2016.

== Music video ==
The music video was directed by Trey Fanjoy, and premiered on CMT on January 12, 2004. It features Jackson singing the song while sitting on a stool playing a guitar, as home movie footage of Jackson's childhood and life plays in the background. He is also seen in some scenes dancing with his wife, Denise.

== Charts ==
=== Weekly charts ===
Chart (2003–2004)	Peak position
US Hot Country Songs (Billboard)	1
US Billboard Hot 100	29

=== Year-end charts ===
Chart (2004)	Position
US Billboard Hot 100	82
US Country Songs (Billboard)	2

== Certifications ==
Region	Certification	Certified units/sales
United States (RIAA)	5× Platinum	5,000,000^{‡}
^{‡} Sales+streaming figures based on certification alone.
