= There Goes My Life =

Single by Kenny Chesney

from the album When the Sun Goes Down
- Released: October 20, 2003
- Recorded: 2003
- Genre: Country
- Length: 3:55 (single version); 5:02 (album version)
- Label: BNA
- Songwriters: Neil Thrasher; Wendell Mobley
- Producers: Buddy Cannon; Kenny Chesney

Kenny Chesney singles chronology
"No Shoes, No Shirt No Problems" (2003)	"There Goes My Life" (2003)	"When the Sun Goes Down" (2004)

Music video
- "There Goes My Life" on YouTube

"There Goes My Life" is a song written by Wendell Mobley and Neil Thrasher and recorded by American country music singer Kenny Chesney. It was released in October 2003 as the first single from Chesney's 2004 album When the Sun Goes Down. The song spent seven consecutive weeks at number one on the US Billboard Hot Country Songs chart between late December 2003 and January 2004. It also peaked at number 29 on the Billboard Hot 100.

== Content ==
The song is about a teen, who is blindsided when he finds out that his girlfriend is pregnant. He tells the audience that his dreams of skipping town after graduation and hanging out on the coast are ruined; in the chorus he sings, "There goes my life." By the next verse he is married to his girlfriend and their child is now a toddler. The boy discovers that it was all worth it in the end and that he loves his child more than anything. By the final verse, his daughter is grown up and going off to the West Coast herself. The father thinks as she drives away, "There goes my life, my future, my everything ..."

== Music video ==
The music video was directed by Shaun Silva and premiered on CMT on October 28, 2003. In the video, the protagonist is a high school football player, played by Austin Chittim. He is met after practice by his girlfriend, with news of her pregnancy. The couple decide to keep the baby, who becomes a source of happiness for them. When she grows up, she has to leave to pursue her education. The grown daughter in the video is played by Amber Heard, while the girlfriend in flashbacks is played by Meredith McCoy. The video was shot in Manor, Texas at the old High School.

== Chart performance ==
The song debuted at number 46 on the US Billboard Hot Country Singles & Tracks (now Hot Country Songs) chart for the week of October 25, 2003. It reached number one on that chart for the week of December 20, 2003, and held that position for seven consecutive weeks until it was knocked off by Alan Jackson's "Remember When". The song also peaked at number 29 on the Billboard Hot 100.

Chart (2003–2004)	Peak position
US Hot Country Songs (Billboard)	1
US Billboard Hot 100	29

=== Year-end charts ===
Chart (2004)	Position
US Country Songs (Billboard)	22

== Certifications ==
Region	Certification	Certified units/sales
United States (RIAA)	3× Platinum	3,000,000^{‡}
^{‡} Sales+streaming figures based on certification alone.
