= Keg in the Closet =

Single by Kenny Chesney

from the album When the Sun Goes Down
- Released: May 9, 2005
- Recorded: 2004
- Genre: Country
- Length: 3:32
- Label: BNA
- Songwriters: Kenny Chesney; Brett James
- Producers: Buddy Cannon; Kenny Chesney

Kenny Chesney singles chronology
"Anything but Mine" (2005)	"Keg in the Closet" (2005)	"Who You'd Be Today" (2005)

"Keg in the Closet" is a song co-written and recorded by American country music artist Kenny Chesney. It was released in May 2005 as the sixth and final single from his 2004 album When the Sun Goes Down. The song peaked at number 6 on the US Billboard Hot Country Songs chart in mid-2005.

A revamped version of the song, featuring a more aggressive, Southern rock inspired sound, appears in Live: Live Those Songs Again, a live album that came out in 2006.

== Content ==
"Keg in the Closet" was written by Chesney and Brett James, who also wrote the title track to When the Sun Goes Down. The song is an uptempo tune that recalls various details of college life in the late 1980s, including a beer keg which was hidden in the closet at Chesney's fraternity, Lambda Chi Alpha.

== Critical reception ==
Kevin John Coyne, reviewing the song for Country Universe, gave it a negative rating. He said that Chesney "only seems to record two types of songs – drinking anthems, and nostalgic longings for the days of youth." He goes on to say that this song is both a drinking anthem and a nostalgic longing. He sums up his review by saying that this song "is basically “Young” all over again."

== Chart positions ==
The song debuted at number 38 on the U.S. Billboard Hot Country Singles & Tracks for the week ending May 7, 2005.

Chart (2005)	Peak position
Canada Country (Radio & Records)	5
US Hot Country Songs (Billboard)	6
US Billboard Hot 100	64

=== Year-end charts ===
Chart (2005)	Position
US Country Songs (Billboard)	43
