= Anything but Mine =

Single by Kenny Chesney

from the album When the Sun Goes Down
- Released: January 3, 2005
- Genre: Country
- Length: 5:25 (album version); 3:59 (radio edit)
- Label: BNA
- Songwriter: Scooter Carusoe
- Producers: Buddy Cannon; Kenny Chesney

Kenny Chesney singles chronology
"The Woman with You" (2004)	"Anything but Mine" (2005)	"Keg in the Closet" (2005)

Music video
- "Anything But Mine" on YouTube

"Anything but Mine" is a song written by Scooter Carusoe and recorded by American country music artist Kenny Chesney. It was released in January 2005 as the fifth single from Chesney's 2004 album When the Sun Goes Down. The song reached number one on the U.S. Billboard Hot Country Songs chart in April 2005.

== Content ==
The song is a mid-tempo ballad in which the narrator recalls a teen-aged encounter with a female, during a late summer vacation in a beach town. In the chorus, he explains that although he has to leave the next day to his home in Cleveland (TN), he still tells her, "I don't see how you could ever be anything but mine". The radio edit features an abridged intro and outro, while the album version features a false ending, followed by another repetition of the chorus run through a vocal filter.

Scooter Carusoe, the writer of this song, also co-wrote Chesney's 2008 Number One hit "Better as a Memory" with Lady Goodman.

== Music video ==
The music video was directed by Shaun Silva, edited by Scott Mele, and premiered on CMT on November 25, 2004, during CMT's Top 20 Countdown. It was shot in Malibu, California, and Myrtle Beach, South Carolina. Chesney and his band were filmed in Myrtle Beach at Family Kingdom Amusement Park, in front of a ride called, "The Hurricane," and the Myrtle Beach Pavilion, The scenes featuring surfer Amy Cobb as "Mary" were shot on the California coast & also in Myrtle Beach. Sonny Miller, who also shot the film "Blue Crush," was employed for the underwater and surfing scenes in California.

== Chart performance ==
"Anything but Mine" debuted at number 52 on the U.S. Billboard Hot Country Songs chart for the week of January 1, 2005.

Chart (2005)	Peak position
Canada Country (Radio & Records)	2
US Hot Country Songs (Billboard)	1
US Billboard Hot 100	48

=== Year-end charts ===
Chart (2005)	Position
US Country Songs (Billboard)	13

== Certifications ==
Region	Certification	Certified units/sales
United States (RIAA)	Platinum	1,000,000^{‡}
^{‡} Sales+streaming figures based on certification alone.
