= When the Sun Goes Down (Kenny Chesney song) =

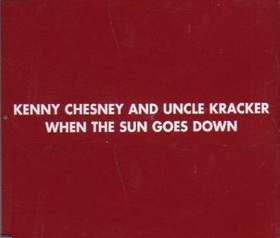

Single by Kenny Chesney and Uncle Kracker

from the album When the Sun Goes Down
- Released: February 2, 2004
- Recorded: 2004
- Genre: Country
- Length: 4:50 (album version); 3:28 (single version)
- Label: BNA
- Songwriter: Brett James
- Producers: Buddy Cannon; Kenny Chesney

Kenny Chesney singles chronology
"There Goes My Life" (2003)	"When the Sun Goes Down" (2004)	"I Go Back" (2004)

Uncle Kracker singles chronology
"Memphis Soul Song" (2003)	"When the Sun Goes Down" (2004)	"Rescue" (2004)

Music video
- "When the Sun Goes Down" on YouTube

"When the Sun Goes Down" is a song written by Brett James and recorded by American country music artist Kenny Chesney as a duet with Uncle Kracker. It was released in February 2004 as the second single and title track from Chesney's 2004 album of the same name. The song reached number one on the US Billboard Hot Country Singles & Tracks chart on April 3, holding the number one position for five weeks. It also reached number 26 on the Billboard Hot 100. It was Uncle Kracker's first appearance on the country music charts, his next one being "Smile".

The song appears on the game Karaoke Revolution Country. It was also one of two collaborations between Chesney and Kracker released in 2004, the other being "Last Night Again" from the latter's album Seventy Two and Sunny released four months later.

== Music video ==
The music video was directed by Shaun Silva, and premiered on CMT on February 6, 2004. The video shoot took place during Chesney's Keg in the Closet Tour at small venues near college campuses, including the 40 Watt Club in Athens, Georgia. The beach scenes were shot in South Florida.

== Chart performance ==
"When the Sun Goes Down" debuted at number 40 on the U.S. Billboard Hot Country Songs chart for the week of February 7, 2004.

== Charts ==
=== Weekly charts ===
Chart (2004)	Peak position
Canada Country (Radio & Records)	1
US Hot Country Songs (Billboard)	1
US Billboard Hot 100	26

=== Year-end charts ===
Chart (2004)	Position
US Hot Country Songs (Billboard)	4
US Billboard Hot 100	89

== Certifications ==
Region	Certification	Certified units/sales
United States (RIAA)	3× Platinum	3,000,000^{‡}
^{‡} Sales+streaming figures based on certification alone.
