= I Go Back =

Single by Kenny Chesney

from the album When the Sun Goes Down
- Released: May 3, 2004
- Recorded: Nashville Recordings LLC,
- Genre: Country
- Length: 4:03 (album version); 3:35 (single version)
- Label: BNA
- Songwriter: Kenny Chesney
- Producers: Buddy Cannon; Kenny Chesney

Kenny Chesney singles chronology
"When the Sun Goes Down" (2004)	"I Go Back" (2004)	"Hey, Good Lookin'" (2004)

"I Go Back" is a song written and recorded by American country music artist Kenny Chesney. It was released in May 2004 as the third single from his 2004 album When the Sun Goes Down. The song spent seven weeks at number 2 on the U.S. Billboard Hot Country Songs chart in mid-2004, behind "Live Like You Were Dying" by Tim McGraw.

== Content ==
The song is a mid-tempo in which the narrator recalls various moments in his life, and how he is reminded of each of them every time he hears a certain song. He references many of these songs, including "Jack & Diane", "Only the Good Die Young", and "Rock'n Me". In the chorus, the narrator reflects in his past explaining his time, such as spending time on a football line, "driving [his] first love out to the levee," and losing a good friend, Lance Wilson. One version of the official music video ends with the note: "In memory of Lance Wilson and all the summers I shared with him". Lance Wilson died in a car wreck when he was 17, inspiring the line "the loss of a real good friend, and the 16 summers I shared with him."

== Music video ==
The music video for the song was directed by Shaun Silva, and produced by Steve Gainer. It premiered on CMT on June 12, 2004. Featuring members of Chesney's family, church family, and former track team. It was filmed at Gibbs High School in Corryton, Tennessee, where Chesney grew up. The video had Chesney performing the song at an empty high school gym, as a camera rotates around him, as well as old home footage of Chesney's life, such as his grandmother calling him for dinner, his first crush on the back of his Chevy, his church, and his friend Lance Wilson, who inspired part of the song. Scenes of a merry-go-round are also featured, a metaphor for "going back" to a certain time in life.

== Chart performance ==
"I Go Back" debuted at number 57 on the U.S. Billboard Hot Country Songs chart for the week of May 1, 2004, at the time Chesney's previous single, "When the Sun Goes Down", was still at Number One.

Chart (2004)	Peak position
Canada Country (Radio & Records)	1
US Hot Country Songs (Billboard)	2
US Billboard Hot 100	32

=== Year-end charts ===
Chart (2004)	Position
US Country Songs (Billboard)	14
US Billboard Hot 100	100

== Certifications ==
Certifications for I Go Back
Region	Certification	Certified units/sales
United States (RIAA)	2× Platinum	2,000,000^{‡}
^{‡} Sales+streaming figures based on certification alone.
