= Live in No Shoes Nation =

2017 live album by Kenny Chesney

Live album by Kenny Chesney
- Released: October 27, 2017
- Genre: Country
- Length: 129:10
- Label: Blue Chair/Columbia Nashville
- Producers: Buddy Cannon; Tony Castle; Kenny Chesney

Kenny Chesney chronology
Cosmic Hallelujah (2016)	Live in No Shoes Nation (2017)	Songs for the Saints (2018)

Live in No Shoes Nation is the second live album by American country music singer Kenny Chesney. It was released on October 27, 2017 via Columbia Records.

== Content ==
The album features several of Chesney's singles dating back to 2001, along with various album tracks and cover songs. It includes guest appearances from Eric Church, Taylor Swift, Grace Potter, Dave Matthews, and other artists.

== Critical reception ==
Rating it 3.5 out of 5 stars, Stephen Thomas Erlewine of AllMusic wrote that "While Live in No Shoes Nation is quite slick in both its performance and production, part of its charm is that it's such a professional affair. Chesney may possess an unassuming voice and his songs, even the rocking ones, are laid-back, but he knows how to pump up a crowd."

== Commercial performance ==
Live in No Shoes Nation debuted at number one on the US Billboard 200, becoming Chesney's eighth album to top the chart. It sold in its first week 217,000 copies (219,000 equivalent album units), most of which were generated from sales of concert ticket/album bundle offers. It sold a further 51,000 copies in the second week. As of April 2019, the album has sold 488,800 copies in the United States. On July 31, 2018, the album was certified platinum by the Recording Industry Association of America (RIAA) for combined sales and album-equivalent units of over a million units in the United States.

== Track listing ==
Disc 1

1. "Flora-Bama" (Chesney, Ross Copperman, David Lee Murphy) – 4:31 (8/16/2014 in Perdido Key, FL)
2. "Summertime" (Steve McEwan, Craig Wiseman) – 4:28 (8/16/2014 in Perdido Key, FL)
3. "Big Star" (Stephony Smith) – 5:07 (3/26/2015 in Nashville, TN)
  - with Taylor Swift
4. "Boston" (Chesney, Mark Tamburino) – 6:45 (8/28/2015 in Foxborough, MA)
5. "When I See This Bar" (Chesney, Keith Gattis) – 9:12 (8/24/2013 in Foxborough, MA)
  - with Eric Church
6. "No Shoes, No Shirt, No Problems" (Casey Beathard) – 3:33 (8/16/2014 in Perdido Key, FL)
7. "Anything But Mine" (Scooter Carusoe) – 6:03 (7/30/2011 in Kansas City, MO)
8. "Down the Road" (Mac McAnally) – 3:10 (7/6/2011 in Morrison, CO)
  - with Mac McAnally
9. "Guitars and Tiki Bars" (Chesney, Tamburino, Dean Dillon) – 4:19 (8/27/2016 in Foxborough, MA)
10. "Hemingway's Whiskey" (Guy Clark, Joe Leathers, Ray Stephenson) – 4:06 (4/5/2013 in Austin, TX)
11. "Everybody Wants to Go to Heaven" (Jim Collins, Marty Dodson) – 3:01 (8/27/2011 in Foxborough, MA)
  - with Zac Brown Band
12. "I'm Alive" (Chesney, Tamburino, Dillon) – 3:53 (7/8/2011 in Morrison, CO)
13. "Save It for a Rainy Day" (Matthew Ramsey, Brad Tursi, Andrew Dorff) – 4:15 (7/2/2016 in Pittsburgh, PA)
  - with Old Dominion
14. "Pirate Flag" (Copperman, Murphy) – 4:21 (4/13/2013 in Fort Lauderdale, FL)

Disc 2

1. "Somewhere with You" (J. T. Harding, Shane McAnally) – 4:28 (8/27/2016 in Foxborough, MA)
2. "I Go Back" (Chesney) – 5:56 (8/27/2016 in Foxborough, MA)
3. "One Step Up" (Bruce Springsteen) – 6:29 (5/12/2016 in Asbury Park, NJ)
4. "American Kids" (Rodney Clawson, Luke Laird, McAnally) – 5:30 (Foxborough, MA)
5. "You and Tequila" (Matraca Berg, Deana Carter) – 4:45 (7/8/2011 in Morrison, CO)
  - with Grace Potter
6. "Young" (McEwan, Wiseman, Naoise Sheridan) – 4:32 (8/26/2016 in Foxborough, MA)
7. "There Goes My Life" (Wendell Mobley, Neil Thrasher) – 4:33 (Foxborough, MA)
8. "Out Last Night" (Chesney, Brett James) – 4:09 (4/13/2013 in Fort Lauderdale, FL)
9. "Dust on the Bottle" (Murphy) – 3:41 (8/16/2014 in Perdido Key, FL)
  - with David Lee Murphy
10. "Coastal" (Thrasher, W. Mobley, Michael Mobley) – 3:12 (3/19/2011 in Tampa, FL)
11. "The Boys of Fall" (Thrasher, Dave Turnbull) – 6:52 (6/20/2015 in Green Bay, WI)
12. "Noise" (Chesney, Copperman, McAnally, Jon Nite) – 3:37
13. "Old Blue Chair" (Chesney) – 3:36 (7/30/2011 in Kansas City, MO)
14. Medley: "The Joker" (Steve Miller, Eddie Curtis, Ahmet Ertegun) /"Three Little Birds" (Bob Marley) – 5:14 (9/7/2007 in Atlanta, GA)
  - with Dave Matthews
15. "Happy on the Hey Now (A Song for Kristi)" (Chesney) – 5:52 (8/24/2013 in Foxborough, MA)

== Charts ==
=== Weekly charts ===
Chart (2017)	Peak position
Canadian Albums (Billboard)	18
US Billboard 200	1
US Top Country Albums (Billboard)	1

=== Year-end charts ===
Chart (2017)	Position
US Billboard 200	132
US Top Country Albums (Billboard)	18

Chart (2018)	Position
US Billboard 200	199
US Top Country Albums (Billboard)	29

== Certifications ==
Region	Certification	Certified units/sales
United States (RIAA)	Platinum	1,000,000^{‡}
^{‡} Sales+streaming figures based on certification alone.
