= Sony Music Nashville =

Country music branch of Sony Music Entertainment

- Parent company: Sony Music Entertainment
- Founded: 1950; 76 years ago
- Genre: Country
- Country of origin: U.S.
- Location: Nashville, Tennessee
- Official website: sonymusicnashville.com

Sony Music Nashville is the country music branch of the Sony Music Group.

Based in Nashville, Tennessee, Sony Music Nashville includes its three country recording labels Arista Nashville, Columbia Nashville, and RCA Nashville, as well as Christian music company Provident Label Group, and independent music distribution company The Orchard.

== History ==
Second logo used from 2020 to 2023

Since 2015, Sony Music Nashville has been overseen by CEO Randy Goodman.

In January 2011, Sony Music Nashville announced an exclusive worldwide distribution deal with Skyville Records, a new Nashville label headed up by music producer Paul Worley.

In August 2011, Sony Music Nashville announced a restructuring that realigned several artists among its labels and merged the promotion teams for BNA Records and Columbia Nashville, while retaining the respective label identities for both BNA and Columbia artists and releases.

In February 2012, Sony Music Nashville entered into an exclusive distribution deal with new Nashville-based label, Streamsound Records, launched by producer Byron Gallimore and industry veteran Jim Wilkes.

On June 4, 2012, it was announced that BNA Records would be retired and its roster moved to Columbia Nashville, leaving Sony Music Nashville with three country labels.

In September 2012, Overton and rpmentertainment president Scott Siman announced an exclusive worldwide distribution and license agreement to distribute rpme singles and albums.

== Notable artists on Sony Music Nashville ==
- Graham Barham
- Brooks & Dunn
- Kane Brown
- Luke Combs (Columbia/River House)
- Corey Kent
- Zach John King
- Dylan Marlowe
- Kameron Marlowe
- Megan Moroney
- Old Dominion
- Emily Ann Roberts
- Nate Smith
- Tigirlily Gold

=== Formerly on Columbia Nashville ===
- Jessi Alexander
- John Anderson
- Keith Anderson
- Lynn Anderson
- Blackhawk
- Larry Boone
- Wade Bowen
- Harold Bradley
- Caitlin & Will
- Calamity Jane
- Stacy Dean Campbell
- Mary Chapin Carpenter
- Johnny Cash
- June Carter Cash
- Rosanne Cash
- Kenny Chesney
- Mark Chesnutt
- David Allan Coe
- Rodney Crowell
- Jimmy Dean
- Cole Deggs & the Lonesome
- Dixie Chicks (Columbia/Open Wide)
- Deryl Dodd
- Johnny Duncan
- Emilio Navaira
- Barbara Fairchild
- Shelly Fairchild
- Fairground Saints (Sony Nashville)
- Tyler Farr
- Lester Flatt
- Béla Fleck
- Lefty Frizzell
- Ben Gallaher (Sony Nashville)
- Hank Garland
- Bradley Gaskin
- Mark Gray
- Great Plains
- Wade Hayes
- Jack Ingram
- The Highwaymen
- Casey James
- Christian Kane
- Elle King
- Miranda Lambert
- Levon
- Brice Long
- Bobby Lord
- Tim McGraw
- Barbara Mandrell
- Matthews, Wright & King
- Tim Mensy
- Ashley Monroe
- Montgomery Gentry
- Maren Morris
- Nikki Nelson
- Willie Nelson
- Kris Kristofferson
- The O'Kanes
- Old Crow Medicine Show
- Steven Lee Olsen
- Dolly Parton
- Carl Perkins
- Kellie Pickler
- Pistol Annies
- Ray Price
- Mike Reid
- Ricochet
- Marty Robbins
- Jameson Rodgers (Columbia/River House)
- David Rogers
- John Wesley Ryles
- Earl Scruggs
- Shenandoah
- Ricky Van Shelton
- Jessica Simpson
- Carl Smith
- Connie Smith
- Joanna Smith
- Doug Stone
- Larry Stewart
- Marty Stuart
- Mitchell Tenpenny (Columbia/Riser House)
- Rick Trevino
- Josh Thompson
- Tenille Townes
- Travis Tritt
- Tanya Tucker
- Leah Turner
- Billy Walker
- Charlie Walker
- Van Zant
- Ron Wallace
- Joy Lynn White
- Trent Willmon
- Gretchen Wilson

=== Formerly on Epic Nashville ===
- Stephanie Bentley
- James Bonamy
- Tommy Cash
- Charlie Daniels Band
- Tammy Cochran
- Brad Cotter
- Bobbie Cryner
- Clint Daniels
- Linda Davis
- Darryl & Don Ellis
- Joe Diffie
- Dixiana
- Jace Everett
- Exile
- Gibson/Miller Band
- Billy Gilman
- The Goldens
- Merle Haggard
- Susan Haynes
- Ty Herndon
- David Houston
- Waylon Jennings
- Jim & Jesse
- George Jones
- The Kinleys
- Miranda Lambert
- Patty Loveless
- Brad Martin
- Ken Mellons
- Keith Palmer
- Johnny Paycheck
- Colt Prather
- Jon Randall
- Collin Raye
- Charlie Rich
- Charlie Robison
- Tim Ryan
- The Shooters
- Ricky Skaggs
- Russell Smith
- Sons of the Desert
- Joe Stampley
- Keith Stegall
- Les Taylor
- Gene Watson
- Wild Horses
- Joy Lynn White
- Gretchen Wilson
- Tammy Wynette

=== Formerly on Monument Nashville ===
- Billy Ray Cyrus
- Joe Diffie
- Dixie Chicks
- Gil Grand
- Yankee Grey
- Wade Hayes
- Cledus T. Judd
- Danni Leigh
- Little Big Town
- Michael Peterson

=== Formerly on BNA Records ===
- Rhett Akins
- John Anderson
- Marc Beeson
- Wade Bowen
- Shannon Brown
- Tracy Byrd
- Kenny Chesney
- Terri Clark
- Kellie Coffey
- Dale Daniel
- Jennifer Day
- Bill Engvall
- Tyler Farr
- Pat Green
- Merle Haggard
- Kim Hill
- Jesse Hunter
- Casey James
- Keith Whitley
- Chris Janson
- Sarah Johns
- Jamey Johnson
- George Jones (Bandit/BNA)
- The Kentucky Headhunters
- Blaine Larsen (Giantslayer/BNA)
- Jim Lauderdale
- Aaron Lines
- Lonestar
- The Lost Trailers
- The Lunabelles
- Mindy McCready
- Craig Morgan
- Lorrie Morgan
- K. T. Oslin
- Kellie Pickler
- Pinmonkey
- Rachel Proctor
- The Remingtons
- John Rich
- Tim Ryan
- Jason Sellers
- Lisa Stewart
- Doug Supernaw
- Tebey
- Turner Nichols
- Ray Vega
- The Warren Brothers
- B. B. Watson
- The Wilkinsons

=== Formerly on Lucky Dog Records ===
- BR549
- The Derailers
- Deryl Dodd
- Jack Ingram
- Bruce Robison
- Charlie Robison
- Pam Tillis

=== Formerly on RCA Nashville ===
- Alabama
- Deborah Allen
- Eddy Arnold
- Chet Atkins
- Baillie & the Boys
- Bobby Bare
- Jeff Bates
- Matraca Berg
- Clint Black
- Catherine Britt
- Garth Brooks
- Jim Ed Brown
- Tracy Byrd
- Helen Cornelius
- Paul Craft
- Gail Davies
- Skeeter Davis
- John Denver
- Dean Dillon
- Ty England
- Sara Evans
- Leon Everette
- Family Brown
- Ray Price (RCA/Dimension)
- Foster & Lloyd
- Keith Gattis
- Vince Gill
- Danny Gokey
- Andy Griggs
- Gus Hardin
- Mike Henderson
- Becky Hobbs
- Ryan Hurd (Moved to Arista Nashville)
- Andrew Jannakos
- Waylon Jennings
- George Jones
- The Judds (RCA/Curb)
- Kristen Kelly
- Miranda Lambert
- Aaron Lines
- Eddie London
- Brice Long
- Love and Theft
- Lauren Lucas
- Louise Mandrell
- Jim Lauderdale
- Martina McBride
- Coley McCabe
- Pake McEntire
- Ronnie Milsap
- Niko Moon (RCA/River House)
- Lorrie Morgan
- Juice Newton
- The Oak Ridge Boys
- Jamie O'Hara
- Old Dominion(Moved to Arista Nashville)
- Robert Ellis Orrall
- Jake Owen
- Dolly Parton
- Pistol Annies
- The Osborn Sisters
- K.T. Oslin
- Paul Overstreet
- Bobby Pinson
- Prairie Oyster
- Charley Pride
- Eddie Rabbitt
- Eddy Raven
- Jerry Reed
- Jim Reeves
- Restless Heart
- Restless Road
- Kenny Rogers
- Crystal Shawanda
- Shenandoah
- Connie Smith
- Joanna Smith
- Hank Snow
- Jo-El Sonnier
- Tate Stevens
- Jimmy Buffett (RCA/Mailboat)
- Tommy Shane Steiner
- Larry Stewart
- Sylvia
- Nat Stuckey
- 3 of Hearts
- Josh Thompson
- The Thompson Brothers Band
- Mel Tillis
- Aaron Tippin
- Steve Vaus
- Morgan Wade
- Porter Wagoner
- Clay Walker
- Rachel Wammack
- Steve Wariner
- Dottie West
- Lari White
- Keith Whitley
- Chuck Wicks
- Wild Choir
- Don Williams
- Trisha Yearwood
- Chris Young

=== Formerly on Arista Nashville ===
- Brent Anderson
- Carlton Anderson
- Keith Anderson
- Asleep at the Wheel
- Sherrié Austin
- Adam Brand
- Blackhawk
- BR549
- Brooks & Dunn
- Kix Brooks
- Shannon Brown
- Cam
- Deana Carter
- Jason Michael Carroll
- Jim Collins
- Kristy Lee Cook
- Rob Crosby
- Clint Daniels
- Linda Davis
- Diamond Rio
- Adam Doleac
- The Doobie Brothers
- Ronnie Dunn
- Seth Ennis
- Exile
- Radney Foster
- The Henningsens
- Rebecca Lynn Howard
- Ryan Hurd
- Alan Jackson
- Brett James
- Carolyn Dawn Johnson
- Jypsi
- Kristen Kelly
- Miranda Lambert
- LANco
- Tim McGraw & Faith Hill
- Logan Mize
- Dude Mowrey
- Jerrod Niemann
- Old Dominion
- Lee Roy Parnell
- Brad Paisley
- Seaforth
- The Sisterhood
- Nate Smith
- Matt Stell
- The Swon Brothers
- Pam Tillis
- The Tractors
- Ryan Tyler
- Carrie Underwood
- Phil Vassar
- Morgan Wade
- Steve Wariner
- Calvin Wiggett
- Michelle Wright

=== Formerly on Arista Austin ===
- Jeff Black
- Radney Foster
- Robert Earl Keen
- Abra Moore
- Sister 7
- Townes Van Zandt

=== Formerly on Career Records ===
- Tammy Graham
- Brett James
- Lee Roy Parnell

== See also ==
- Arista Nashville
- BNA Records
- Columbia Records
- RCA Records
- The Orchard
