= Greatest Hits II (Kenny Chesney album) =

Greatest hits album by Kenny Chesney
- Released: May 19, 2009
- Genre: Country
- Length: 65:51
- Label: BNA
- Producer: Buddy Cannon; Kenny Chesney

Kenny Chesney chronology
Lucky Old Sun (2008)	Greatest Hits II (2009)	Hemingway's Whiskey (2010)

Singles from Greatest Hits II
- 1. "Out Last Night" Released: April 6, 2009; 2. "I'm Alive" Released: August 17, 2009; 3. "Ain't Back Yet" Released: February 22, 2010

Professional ratings
Review scores
Source	Rating
Allmusic	4/5 stars

Greatest Hits II is a compilation album by American country music artist Kenny Chesney. It was released on May 19, 2009, and it is his second greatest hits album since Greatest Hits in 2000. The album includes twelve singles from 2002 to 2009, as well as two non-singles from previous albums ("Be as You Are" from Be as You Are (Songs from an Old Blue Chair) and "I'm Alive" from Lucky Old Sun). Also included is the new song "Out Last Night", which was issued as a single in April 2009, followed by "I'm Alive" in August 2009.

The album was re-released on February 9, 2010 to include two new tracks, "This Is Our Moment" and "Ain't Back Yet". The former was used by the television network ESPN as a college football theme and peaked at number 46 based on unsolicited airplay, while the latter was released to radio as the album's single in February 2010.

For unknown reasons, several hits, including the number-one singles "Don't Blink", "Better as a Memory", and "Everybody Wants to Go to Heaven" were excluded from this album.

== Critical reception ==
Stephen Thomas Erlewine, reviewing the album for Allmusic, gave it four stars out of five. He said that the album was stronger than his last two studio albums because it did not contain as many laid-back songs. Erlewine also called "Out Last Night" an "amiable day-after shuffle."

== Commercial performance ==
The album debuted at number three on the US Billboard 200 and number one on the US Top Country Albums in its first week of release. On November 27, 2012, the album was certified platinum by the Recording Industry Association of America (RIAA) selling over a million copies in the United States. As of April 2017, the album has sold 1,343,500 copies in the United States.

== Track listing ==
No.	Title	Writer(s)	Length
1.	"Out Last Night"	Kenny Chesney, Brett James	3:21
2.	"Living in Fast Forward"	David Lee Murphy, Rivers Rutherford	3:32
3.	"Young"	Craig Wiseman, Naoise Sheridan, Steve McEwan	3:56
4.	"Summertime"	Wiseman, McEwan	3:27
5.	"Down the Road" (duet with Mac McAnally)	Mac McAnally	3:01
6.	"Beer in Mexico"	Chesney	4:32
7.	"There Goes My Life"	Neil Thrasher, Wendell Mobley	5:02
8.	"When the Sun Goes Down" (duet with Uncle Kracker)	James	4:50
9.	"Anything but Mine"	Scooter Carusoe	5:24
10.	"Be as You Are"	Chesney, Dean Dillon	4:20
11.	"I Go Back"	Chesney	4:03
12.	"No Shoes, No Shirt, No Problems"	Casey Beathard	3:29
13.	"The Good Stuff"	Wiseman, Jim Collins	3:20
14.	"Never Wanted Nothing More"	Ronnie Bowman, Chris Stapleton	3:28
15.	"I'm Alive" (duet with Dave Matthews)	Chesney, Dillon, Mark Tamburino	3:19

Re-Release Bonus Tracks
No.	Title	Writer(s)	Length
16.	"This Is Our Moment"	Chesney	3:08
17.	"Ain't Back Yet"	Wiseman, Chris Tompkins	3:46

== Personnel on "Out Last Night" ==
- Wyatt Beard - background vocals
- Mark Beckett - drums
- Pat Buchanan - electric guitar
- Kenny Chesney - lead vocals
- Kenny Greenberg - electric guitar
- John Hobbs - Wurlitzer
- Randy McCormick - Hammond B-3 organ
- Larry Paxton - bass guitar
- Scott Vestal - banjo
- John Willis - acoustic guitar

== Charts ==
=== Weekly charts ===
Chart (2009)	Peak position
Canadian Albums (Billboard)	14
US Billboard 200	3
US Top Country Albums (Billboard)	1

=== Year-end charts ===
Chart (2009)	Position
US Billboard 200	67
US Top Country Albums (Billboard)	14
Chart (2010)	Position
US Billboard 200	148
US Top Country Albums (Billboard)	26
Chart (2018)	Position
US Top Country Albums (Billboard)	69
Chart (2019)	Position
US Top Country Albums (Billboard)	54
Chart (2020)	Position
US Top Country Albums (Billboard)	60
Chart (2021)	Position
US Top Country Albums (Billboard)	71

== Certifications ==
Region	Certification	Certified units/sales
United States (RIAA)	Platinum	1,000,000^{^}
^{^} Shipments figures based on certification alone.
