= Who You'd Be Today =

Single by Kenny Chesney

from the album The Road and the Radio
- Released: September 12, 2005
- Recorded: 2005
- Genre: Country
- Length: 4:14
- Label: BNA 82876-72952
- Songwriters: Bill Luther; Aimee Mayo
- Producers: Buddy Cannon; Kenny Chesney

Kenny Chesney singles chronology
"Keg in the Closet" (2005)	"Who You'd Be Today" (2005)	"Living in Fast Forward" (2006)

Music video
- "Who You'd Be Today" on YouTube

"Who You'd Be Today" is a song written by Aimee Mayo and Bill Luther and recorded by American country music singer Kenny Chesney. It was released in September 2005 as the first single from Chesney's 2005 album The Road and the Radio. It was also Chesney's highest-debuting single at the time, having entered the U.S. Billboard Hot Country Songs chart at number 26. This record has since been broken by "Don't Blink", which debuted at number 16 two years later.

Despite reaching number 2 on the U.S. Billboard Hot Country Songs chart, this song is not included on Chesney's 2009 compilation album Greatest Hits II.

== Content ==
"Who You'd Be Today" is a song to a person who died before their time ("It ain't fair, you died too young / Like a story that had just begun / But death tore the pages all away"). The narrator describes how much he has missed that person and questions what their life would be like if they were still alive ("Sometimes, I wonder who you'd be today"). The song ends with the narrator saying that the only hope that comes from the death is knowing they'll see each other again someday.

== Music video ==
The music video was directed by Shaun Silva and premiered on CMT on September 29, 2005. It starts off with two teenage boys in a basketball practice, and then cuts to Chesney's performance, and subjects related to the song's storyline. Throughout the video, friends and couples are seen speaking to each other. A high-school couple is seen talking together, and flashbacks are seen, implying that the woman was killed in a car crash. A woman is sitting on a bench, talking to a man, later scenes show the woman pulled from a burning building, and imply the man died in the fire. The boys playing basketball are also seen playing at the same court as kids, then cutting to serving in the military. As the boys run up the basketball court, one of them disappears, revealing the other one to be playing alone and reflecting on the past with his friend.

The music video reached number 1 on CMT's Top Twenty Countdown for the week of December 15, 2005.

== Chart performance ==
The song debuted at number 26 on the U.S. Billboard Hot Country Songs for the week ending October 1, 2005.

Chart (2005–2006)	Peak position
Canada Country (Radio & Records)	1
US Hot Country Songs (Billboard)	2
US Billboard Hot 100	37
US Billboard Pop 100	61

=== Year-end charts ===
Chart (2006)	Position
US Country Songs (Billboard)	55

== Certifications ==
Region	Certification	Certified units/sales
United States (RIAA)	Gold	500,000^{^}
^{^} Shipments figures based on certification alone.
