= Steve Gainer =

American cinematographer

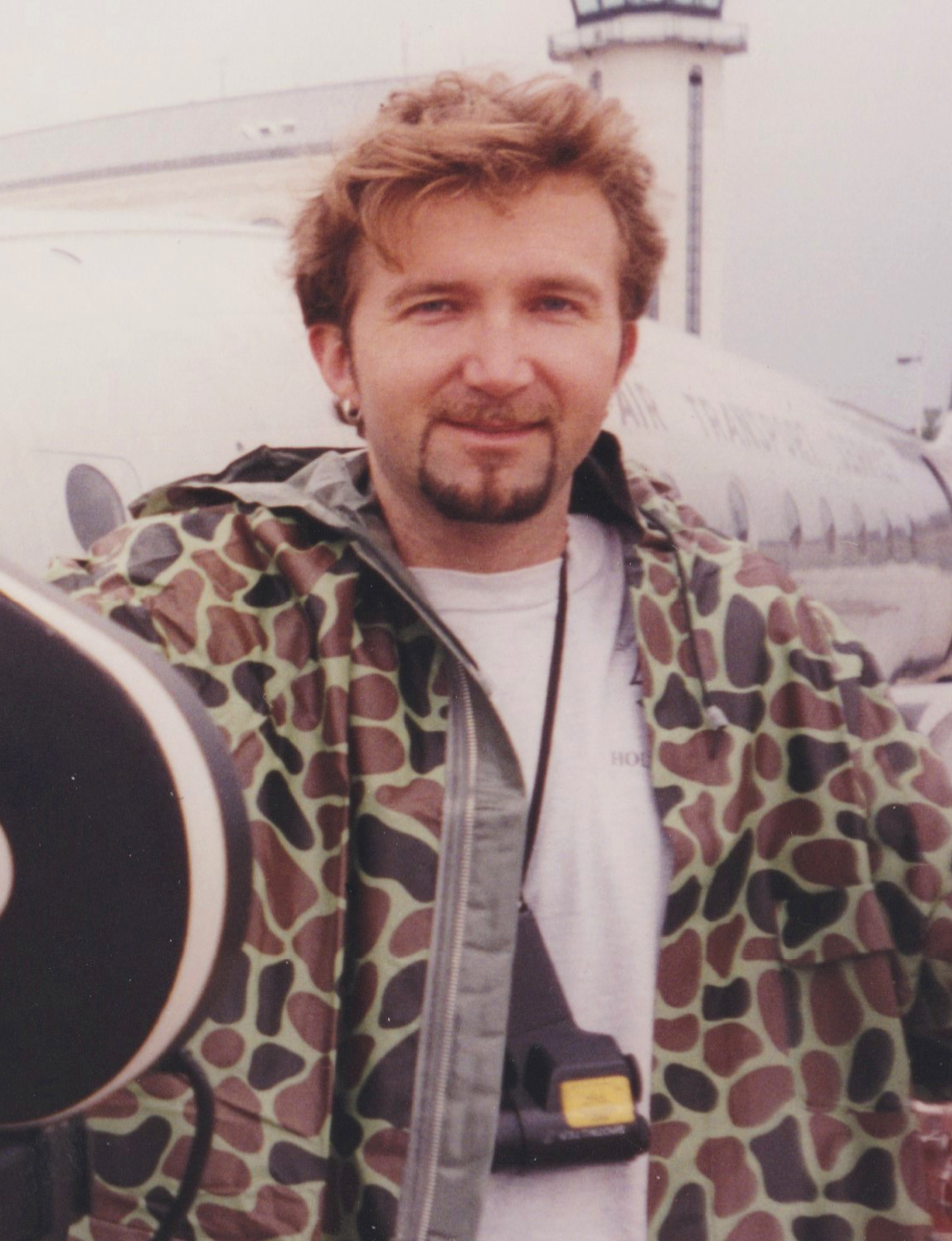
- Gainer in 1995
- Born: Alexandria, Louisiana, US
- Occupations: Cinematographer; director; producer

Steve Gainer, ASC ASK is an Emmy Award winning American cinematographer, director, and producer. He is a member and museum curator of the American Society of Cinematographers, a member of the Directors Guild of America, and the Academy of Motion Picture Arts and Sciences.

In 2013 and 2015, Gainer directed episodes of the MTV comedy-drama series Awkward. In 2014, he won a Daytime Emmy for a PSA based on that series.

== Filmography ==
=== Film ===
Year	Title	Director	Notes
1994	Ceremony	Joe Castro	
1997	Expose	Brian Rudnick	
1997	Macon County Jail	Victoria Muspratt	With Harry C. Box
1997	Don't Sleep Alone	Tim Andrew	
1997	Shadow Dancer	Stanley Lee; Stanley Yung	With Michael E.J. Miller
1999	Road Kill	Matthew Leutwyler	
1999	Foolish	Dave Meyers	
1999	Facade	Carl Colpaert	
2001	Bully	Larry Clark	
2004	Black Cloud	Ricky Schroder	
2004	Mysterious Skin	Gregg Araki	
2004	A Dirty Shame	John Waters	
2005	Wassup Rockers	Larry Clark	
2007	You Are Here	Henry Pincus	
2007	Remember the Daze	Jess Bond	
2008	While She Was Out	Susan Montford	
2008	Punisher: War Zone	Lexi Alexander	
2009	Taking Chances	Kit Umbrage	With Brian Sweeney
2010	Super	James Gunn	
2010	Dirty Girl	Abe Sylvia	
2011	Setup	Mike Gunther	Direct-to-video
2012	Nature Calls	Todd Rohal	
2013	A Haunted House	Michael Tiddes	
2014	Everly	Joe Lynch	
2014	Catch Hell	Ryan Phillippe	
2015	Big & Rich: Gravity Long Form Project	Trey Fanjoy	
2017	Mayhem	Joe Lynch	
2019	The Last Laugh	Greg Pritikin	

Short film

Year	Title	Director	Notes
1996	Trust Games	Adam Prince	
1998	Luz de la mission	Martin Flores	With Peter Rieveschl and Mario Zavala
2001	Note come due	Jordan Freid	
2002	Heroes	Johnathon Schaech	
2004	Lonely Place	Kevin Ackermann	
2009	One Night Only	Chadd Harbold	
2013	The Thread	Steven Brill	Segments of Movie 43
2013	Victory's Glory	Rusty Cundieff	Segments of Movie 43
2013	Beezel	James Gunn	Segments of Movie 43
2018	Day of Reckoning	Jeff Wolfe	
TBA	The Runt	Christy Stratton	

Documentary film

Year	Title	Director	Note
1999	Three Days	Kevin Ford; C.B. Smith	With Kevin Ford and Luke Geissbühler

=== Television ===
Year	Title	Director	Notes
1997	Click	Rolfe Kanefsky; Hamilton Lewiston; Brian Rudnick	Episode "Secrets Revealed"
2008	Camp Rock Freestyle Jam	Art Spigel	TV short
2009	Sugarland: Live on the Inside	Shaun Silva	TV special
2011	Awkward		71 episodes; Also directed episodes "Taking Sides" and "Digging Deep"
2013	Starting Strong		
2014	Happyland	Ryan Shiraki; Peter Lauer; Rebecca Asher; David Katzenberg	7 episodes
2015	Just Add Magic		
2016-2017	Sweet/Vicious	Joseph Kahn; Rebecca Thomas; Brian Dannelly; Todd Biermann; Elodie Keene; Andrew Young	All 10 episodes
2017	Will vs. The Future	Joe Nussbaum	
2019-2020	Schooled		All 34 episodes
2021	On My Block	Valerie Finkel; Eli Gonda; Lauren Iungerich	4 episodes
2021-2022	Puppy Place		All 16 episodes
2022	Life by Ella	Christine Lakin; Ryan Shiraki; Juanesta Holmes; Nimisha Mukerji; Aprill Winney; Linda Mendoza	All 10 episodes
2023	With Love	Paris Barclay; Kim Nguyen; Eli Gonda; Kabir Akhtar	Season 2

TV movies

Year	Title	Director	Notes
2002	Teenage Caveman	Larry Clark	
2013	Our Wild Hearts	Ricky Schroder	Also producer
2013	Ladies' Man: A Made Movie	Ryan Shiraki	
2016	An American Girl Story: Maryellen 1955 - Extraordinary Christmas	Valerie Weiss	
2017	An American Girl Story: Ivy & Julie 1976 - A Happy Balance	Sasie Sealy	
2017	An American Girl Story: Summer Camp, Friends for Life	Alison McDonald	

Documentary film

Year	Title	Director	Note
2010	Boys of Fall	Shaun Silva	With Blake McClure

== Videography ==
Year	Title	Artist	Director	Source
1998	"Tell Me (Remix)"	Beenie Man ft. Angie Martinez	Mike Maloy	
1999	"Bawitdaba"	Kid Rock	Dave Meyers	
2001	"Elisabeth"	Billy Gilman	Shaun Silva	
2002	"Young"	Kenny Chesney	Shaun Silva	
2003	"Big Star"	Kenny Chesney	Shaun Silva	
2003	"No Shoes, No Shirt, No Problems"	Kenny Chesney	Shaun Silva	
2003	"Tennessee"	Marcel	Shaun Silva	
2003	"I Hate Everything About You"	Three Days Grace	Scott Winig	
2004	"Whiskey Lullaby"	Brad Paisley ft. Alison Krauss	Rick Schroder	
2004	"First Straw"	311	Scott Winig	
2004	"I Go Back"	Kenny Chesney	Shaun Silva	
2004	"Anything but Mine"	Kenny Chesney	Shaun Silva	
2006	"Friendly Fire"	Sean Lennon	Michele Civetta	
2008	"Golden Age"	TV on the Radio	Petro	
2009	"Here Comes Goodbye"	Rascal Flatts	Shaun Silva	
2011	"The Ballad of Mona Lisa"	Panic! at the Disco	Shane Drake	
2014	"We Are Done"	The Madden Brothers	David Katzenberg and Seth Grahame-Smith	
2014	"Lonely Tonight"	Blake Shelton	Shaun Silva	
2018	"Happier"	Marshmello and Bastille	Mercedes Bryce Morgan	
2019	"Here with Me"	Marshmello ft. Chvrches	Mercedes Bryce Morgan	
