= Hemingway's Whiskey =

Studio album by Kenny Chesney
- Released: September 28, 2010
- Recorded: 2010
- Studios: Blackbird (Nashville, Tennessee); Sound Emporium (Nashville, Tennessee)
- Genre: Country
- Length: 43:58
- Label: BNA
- Producers: Buddy Cannon; Kenny Chesney

Kenny Chesney chronology
Greatest Hits II (2009)	Hemingway's Whiskey (2010)	Welcome to the Fishbowl (2012)

Singles from Hemingway's Whiskey
- 1. "The Boys of Fall" Released: July 12, 2010; 2. "Somewhere with You" Released: November 8, 2010; 3. "Live a Little" Released: March 14, 2011; 4. "You and Tequila" Released: May 31, 2011; 5. "Reality" Released: October 3, 2011

Hemingway's Whiskey is the thirteenth studio album by American country music artist Kenny Chesney. It was released on September 28, 2010 on BNA Records, and is his final release for the label. This album received generally positive reviews from music critics. It debuted at number one on the US Billboard 200 chart, selling approximately 183,000 copies during its first week. It has also been certified 2× platinum by the Recording Industry Association of America (RIAA). The album produced five singles on the US Billboard Hot Country Songs chart between 2010 and 2011. Four of those singles "The Boys of Fall", "Somewhere with You", "Live a Little", and "Reality" all reached number one, while "You and Tequila" went to number three.

== Background ==
In an interview with The Boot, Chesney explained the reasoning behind the title of his new release, citing the influence of Guy Clark, saying "I was sitting in my truck and a friend had given me Guy's album, which had just come out. It's a song that talks about living life to its fullest, being a man about your responsibilities and not compromising. As soon as I heard it, I knew I had to cut it -- and call the album that -- because it says everything about the way you live your life, and what life can be if you refuse to buy into limits, which, as someone who's read all his books, is everything Hemingway's novels revolved around."

In a CMT blog, Chesney also commented saying that he wanted the album to be "something more " than its predecessor, Lucky Old Sun: "I came to town to write songs, to make records, to create something that spoke about how I lived, and the people who I knew who were just like me and my friends lived."

"Small Y'all", a duet with George Jones, was originally recorded by Randy Travis on his 1994 album This Is Me and then by Jones on his 1998 album It Don't Get Any Better Than This.

== Critical reception ==
Professional ratings
Review scores
Source	Rating
Engine 145	3.5/5 stars
About.com	3.5/5 stars
AllMusic	3/5 stars
American Songwriter	4/5 stars
Chicago Tribune	2/4 stars
The Dallas Morning News	B+
Entertainment Weekly	B+
Rolling Stone	3.5/5 stars
Roughstock	4/5 stars
USA Today	3/4 stars

Upon its release, Hemingway’s Whiskey received generally positive reviews from most music critics. At Metacritic, which assigns a normalized rating out of 100 to reviews from mainstream critics, the album received an average score of 67, based on 6 reviews, which indicates "generally favorable reviews". Jon Caramanica with The New York Times called the album "darker than his previous work", saying that "on Hemingway's Whiskey, though, his voice sounds smoother and deeper than usual, and he's using it to more potent effect". He also preferred Chesney's version of the title track over Guy Clark's, saying that "[h]is version of the title track is of course far cleaner than Guy Clark’s, whose original take on it was practically withering on the microphone, but Mr. Chesney sounds studious and earnest." Matt Bjorke with Roughstock gave it a four-star rating and called the album " a record that finds Kenny Chesney feeling recharged," and one "that runs the gamut of human emotion and paints stories the way Hemingway’s novels did." Stephen Thomas Erlewine with AllMusic called the album "burnished and classy" and admired the amount of 'slow' material on the album. American Songwriter critic Rick Moore gave it a four star rating. Describing it as "a solid effort", he commented on the songwriting of the album, saying it "pays homage to Nashville’s songwriting community". At Rolling Stone, Jody Rosen found that "Chesney serves up the usual carpe diem anthems", however he noted that "when the mood turns serious, he slips: He can't muster the gravitas to pull off the title track, a maudlin tribute to Ernest Hemingway." In addition, Rosen concluded with "as long as the weather's sunny and the blender's whirring, Chesney's fine company." Robert Silva of About.com called the album a "solid effort". At USA Today, Brian Mansfield proclaimed the effort to be "finely aged country".

Bill Friskics-Warren with The Washington Post called it "his most stylistically wide-ranging [album] to date" and recommended the title track and "Small Y'all" as the best on the album. Blake Boldt with Engine 145 gave it a 3½ out of 5 star rating, calling Chesney "the hillbilly king of the Caribbean." He said "with [the album] he maintains that image and proves that he can still let loose occasionally." Mario Tarradell with The Dallas Morning News called Hemingway's Whiskey his "first exceptionally good CD since 2002's No Shoes, No Shirt, No Problems." Greg Victor with Parcbench called the CD his "first extraordinary album since No Shoes, No Shirt, No Problems" He called the tracks "a little more grown-up than usual", and gave the album a 3½ out of 5 star rating. Stuart Munro with The Boston Globe called it "another well-wrought articulation of Chesney’s musical world" but also noted that "it isn’t all that far from where he’s been since 2002’s No Shoes, No Shirt, No Problems." Jessica Phillips with Country Weekly gave it 3½ out of 5 stars, and noted that his decision to take the past year of touring off "paid off with a more cohesive collection of songs that are at once universal yet obviously personal." She also called his take on the track "Small Y’all" "easily the most traditionally country tune Kenny has recorded during the past few years."

== Commercial performance ==
Hemingway's Whiskey debuted at number one on the US Billboard 200 chart, selling 183,000 copies in its first week. This was Chesney's sixth album to reach number one, thus ranking him second among country artists with the most number one albums, only behind Garth Brooks. In its second week, the album dropped to number two on the Billboard 200, selling an additional 65,000 copies. In its third week, it fell to number six on the chart with 40,000 copies sold. In its fourth week, the album plummeted to number thirteen upon selling 26,126 copies. As of July 2, 2011, the album has sold 850,706 copies in the United States. On November 18, 2022, the album was certified 2× platinum by the Recording Industry Association of America for sales of over two million copies in the United States.

== Track listing ==
No.	Title	Writer(s)	Length
1.	"The Boys of Fall"	Casey Beathard; Dave Turnbull	6:32
2.	"Live a Little"	Shane Minor; David Lee Murphy	3:39
3.	"Coastal"	Michael Mobley; Wendell Mobley; Neil Thrasher	2:40
4.	"You and Tequila" (featuring Grace Potter)	Matraca Berg; Deana Carter	4:03
5.	"Seven Days"	Lee Brice; Billy Montana; Jon Stone	4:20
6.	"Small Y'all" (featuring George Jones)	Bobby Braddock	2:54
7.	"Where I Grew Up"	Ashley Gorley; Kelley Lovelace; Thrasher	3:39
8.	"Reality"	Kenny Chesney; Brett James	3:31
9.	"Round and Round"	Scotty Emerick; Paul Overstreet; Even Stevens	5:05
10.	"Somewhere with You"	J. T. Harding; Shane McAnally	4:04
11.	"Hemingway's Whiskey"	Guy Clark; Ray Stephenson; Joe Leathers	3:28
Total length:			43:58

Deluxe Edition
No.	Title	Writer(s)	Length
12.	"Ain't Ever Going Back Again"	Chesney; James	2:57
13.	"I Didn't Get Here Alone"	Chesney; Michael Dulaney; Thrasher	4:29

== Personnel ==
Additional musicians

- Wyatt Beard – background Vocals
- Mark Beckett – drums
- Pat Buchanan – acoustic guitar, electric guitar
- Buddy Cannon – background vocals
- Melonie Cannon – background vocals
- Kenny Chesney – lead vocals
- Eric Darken – percussion
- Scotty Emerick – background cocals
- Larry Franklin – fiddle
- Sonny Garrish – steel guitar
- Kenny Greenberg – acoustic guitar, electric Guitar
- Rob Hajacos – fiddle
- John Hobbs – keyboards, piano
- George Jones – duet vocals on "Small Y'all"
- Paul Leim – drums, percussion
- Randy McCormick – keyboards
- Paul Overstreet – background Vocals
- Larry Paxton – bass guitar, tic tac bass
- Grace Potter – background vocals on "You and Tequila"
- Mickey Raphael – harmonica
- John Wesley Ryles – background Vocals
- Jeff Taylor – accordion
- Neil Thrasher – background Vocals
- John Willis – acoustic guitar, gut string guitar, mandolin

Production

- Natthaphol Abhigantaphand – mastering assistant
- Shelley Anderson – mastering assistant
- Daniel Bacigalupi – mastering assistant
- Steve Blackmon – mixing assistant
- Drew Bollman – mixing assistant
- Tim Brennan – assistant engineer
- Buddy Cannon – producer
- Butch Carr – engineer
- Tony Castle – engineer
- Kenny Chesney – producer
- Tammie Harris Cleek – imaging, photo production
- Renée Bell – A&R
- Kyle Ford – assistant engineer
- Judy Forde-Blair – creative producer, liner notes
- Gordon Hammond – assistant engineer
- Greg Lawrence – assistant E engineer
- Scott McDaniel – art direction, design
- Andrew Mendelson – mastering
- Seth Morton – assistant engineer
- John Netti – assistant engineer
- Justin Niebank – mixing
- Lowell Reynolds – assistant engineer
- Glen Rose – photography
- Shannon Scott – production coordination

== Charts ==
=== Weekly charts ===
Chart (2010)	Peak position
Australian Albums (ARIA)	73
Australian Country Albums (ARIA)	6
Canadian Albums (Billboard)	10
Norwegian Albums (VG-lista)	37
US Billboard 200	1
US Top Country Albums (Billboard)	1
US Indie Store Album Sales (Billboard)	24

=== Year-end charts ===
Chart (2010)	Position
US Billboard 200	75
US Top Country Albums (Billboard)	12
Chart (2011)	Position
US Billboard 200	42
US Top Country Albums (Billboard)	10
Chart (2012)	Position
US Top Country Albums (Billboard)	55

== Certifications ==
Region	Certification	Certified units/sales
United States (RIAA)	2× Platinum	2,000,000^{‡}
^{‡} Sales+streaming figures based on certification alone.
