= Big Star (song) =

Single by Kenny Chesney

from the album No Shoes, No Shirt, No Problems
- Released: January 20, 2003
- Recorded: 2002
- Genre: Country rock
- Length: 3:59
- Label: BNA
- Songwriter: Stephony Smith
- Producers: Buddy Cannon; Kenny Chesney; Norro Wilson

Kenny Chesney singles chronology
"A Lot of Things Different" (2002)	"Big Star" (2003)	"No Shoes, No Shirt, No Problems" (2003)

"Big Star" is a song written by Stephony Smith and recorded by American country music artist Kenny Chesney. It was released in January 2003 as the fourth single from Chesney's 2002 album No Shoes, No Shirt, No Problems. The song peaked at number 2 on the US Billboard Hot Country Singles & Tracks chart in April 2003, behind Darryl Worley's "Have You Forgotten?".

== Content ==
Chesney says that "This is a fun song. It’s every little girl’s fairy tale – and for some, it even does come true. But it’s not all happily ever after. That line, ‘All her old neighbors swear they're certain she slept her way to the top / But she knows you don’t get where you’re going unless you got something they ain’t got…,’ I love that because it shows you that you can make it in spite of other people refusing to believe in your dream."

== Music video ==
The music video was directed by Shaun Silva, and produced by Steve Gainer. It premiered on CMT on January 28, 2003, when CMT named it a "Hot Shot".

== Live performances ==
Taylor Swift and Kenny Chesney performed the song together twice. The first time was on Swift's Speak Now World Tour during the Nashville, Tennessee show on September 17, 2011, and on Chesney's The Big Revival Tour during the Nashville, Tennessee show on March 26, 2015; the performance was included on his second live album Live in No Shoes Nation (2017).

== Charts ==
"Big Star" debuted at number 51 on the US Billboard Hot Country Songs chart for the week of January 18, 2003.

Chart (2003)	Peak position
US Hot Country Songs (Billboard)	2
US Billboard Hot 100	28

=== Year-end charts ===
Chart (2003)	Position
US Country Songs (Billboard)	16

== Parodies ==
- American parody artist Cledus T. Judd released a parody of "Big Star" titled "New Car" on his 2003 album A Six Pack of Judd.
