= Reality (Kenny Chesney song) =

Single by Kenny Chesney

from the album Hemingway's Whiskey
- Released: October 3, 2011
- Recorded: 2010
- Genre: Country
- Length: 3:31
- Label: BNA
- Songwriters: Kenny Chesney; Brett James
- Producers: Buddy Cannon; Kenny Chesney

Kenny Chesney singles chronology
"You and Tequila" (2011)	"Reality" (2011)	"Feel Like a Rock Star" (2012)

"Reality" is a song co-written and recorded by American country music artist Kenny Chesney. It was released in October 2011 as the fifth and final single from his 2010 album Hemingway's Whiskey. The song became Chesney's twenty-first number one hit on the US Billboard Hot Country Songs chart in early 2012. Chesney wrote this song with Brett James.

== Background and Writing ==
Co-written by Chesney with help from Brett James, he told Billboard magazine's Ray Waddell that he got the idea of writing the song while sitting in a dentist's chair with a gas mask on. "There were a couple of years that I was so busy on the road I was kinda numb," Chesney said. "I wasn't really tired, I wasn't really not tired, I wasn't really happy, I was just kind of numb. So, I'd go to the dentist to have something done and they'd put that gas mask on me and I'd be like, 'Wow, that's as relaxed as I've been in years!' I thought to myself, 'This is why people smoke pot right here! This is it!' I don't smoke pot, but this is why people do it, I guarantee you. Because it gets them away from reality. I even asked my dentist, 'I just want to come over here and sit some time, can you guys do that?' He said, 'We can't do that, we'd get in trouble.' I swear, I started writing that song on the way home. But then, I related it to everybody that comes to see us. That's what live music is. It's an escape from reality. That's why as a kid I loved it. I still love going to shows, I love live music. That's where I got the idea to write the song, it's my message to the fans that it's OK to break free and escape reality, with us."

== Critical reception ==
Billy Dukes of Taste of Country gave the song three stars out of five, saying that it "does and says all the right things" but "[fails] to capture the live energy that Chesney consistently inserted into uptempo hits in the past." Kevin John Coyne of Country Universe gave the song a B grade, saying that while it has a "strong concept", the delivery is "fairly flat." He goes on to say that the production "never takes off" and "keeps things a little too grounded in reality for it to actually sound like the escapism it celebrates.

== Music video ==
The music video was directed by Shaun Silva, and premiered on October 12, 2011.

== Chart performance ==
"Reality" debuted at number 50 on the U.S. Billboard Hot Country Songs chart for the week of October 15, 2011. It also debuted at number 97 on the U.S. Billboard Hot 100 chart for the week of November 19, 2011 and number 96 on the Canadian Hot 100 chart for the week of December 17, 2011.

=== Weekly charts ===
Chart (2011–2012)	Peak position
US Hot Country Songs (Billboard)	1
US Billboard Hot 100	62
Canada Country (Billboard)	2
Canada Hot 100 (Billboard)	77

=== Year-end charts ===
Chart (2012)	Position
US Country Songs (Billboard)	13
