= You Save Me =

Single by Kenny Chesney

from the album The Road and the Radio
- Released: August 14, 2006
- Recorded: 2005
- Genre: Country
- Length: 3:55
- Label: BNA
- Songwriters: Brett James; Troy Verges
- Producers: Buddy Cannon; Kenny Chesney

Kenny Chesney singles chronology
"Summertime" (2006)	"You Save Me" (2006)	"Beer in Mexico" (2007)

"You Save Me" is a song written by Brett James and Troy Verges and recorded by American country music artist Kenny Chesney. It was released on August 14, 2006, as the fourth single from Chesney’s 2005 album The Road and the Radio. The song peaked at number 3 on the U.S. Billboard Hot Country Songs chart and at number 41 on the Billboard Hot 100.

== Content ==
The song is about a man's enduring love for a woman.

== Critical reception ==
Kevin John Coyne, reviewing the song for Country Universe, gave it a positive rating. He summarized his review by saying the song "is awesome, one of the best singles of his career." He then went on to say if Chesney followed up the single with the title song he would be 'two steps closer to the hall of fame'.

== Music video ==
A music video was directed by Shaun Silva. It premiered on CMT on August 10, 2006. According to Chesney, the video took a total of 7 days to shoot, and was filmed in Mexico City. The video begins with Kenny Chesney as a member of the police department, traveling to a criminal spot in Mexico with three local police agents, presumably to make a raid. During the car ride, Chesney thinks back on his time with a girl he met and fell in love with in Mexico, and her attempts to persuade him not to go with them. The agents comment on how he appears to be nervous, to which he replies that it "didn't feel right". His partner challenges him briefly but allows him to walk away while they proceed with the raid. As Chesney starts to leave, he notices how the civilians in the areas are discreetly but uniformly retreating from the criminal spot or taking cover. He becomes suspicious and draws his gun, running towards the entrance, to which the agents had just entered. He is too late to save them, however, when an explosion tears through the building, leaving him as the only survivor. Chesney is anguished by the trap but can't help reflecting on his girlfriend and how she inadvertently saved him as the song begins. Throughout the song, Chesney is riding alone on a bus. As he travels through the country, he passes places he had been with his girlfriend. At the end of the song, he returns safely home to her and they embrace. Chesney is also seen performing the song during the video.

The video peaked at number 1 on CMT's Top Twenty Countdown for two consecutive weeks in November 2006.

== Chart positions ==
"You Save Me" debuted at number 47 on the U.S. Billboard Hot Country Songs chart for the week of August 19, 2006.

Chart (2006)	Peak position
US Hot Country Songs (Billboard)	3
US Billboard Hot 100	41
US Billboard Pop 100	75
Canada Country (Billboard)	4

=== Year-end charts ===
Chart (2006)	Position
US Country Songs (Billboard)	39

== Certifications ==
Region	Certification	Certified units/sales
United States (RIAA)	Platinum	1,000,000^{‡}
^{‡} Sales+streaming figures based on certification alone.
