= Out Last Night =

Single by Kenny Chesney

from the album Greatest Hits II
- Released: April 6, 2009
- Recorded: 2009
- Genre: Country
- Length: 3:21
- Label: BNA
- Songwriters: Kenny Chesney; Brett James
- Producers: Buddy Cannon; Kenny Chesney

Kenny Chesney singles chronology
"Down the Road" (2008)	"Out Last Night" (2009)	"I'm Alive" (2009)

"Out Last Night" is a song co-written and recorded by American country music singer Kenny Chesney. It was released on April 6, 2009 as the first single and only new track on his compilation album Greatest Hits II. The song reached number one on the U.S. Billboard Hot Country Songs chart, becoming his thirty-eighth top 40 hit in the United States. Chesney wrote this song with Brett James.

== Content ==
"Out Last Night" is an up-tempo song in which the male narrator recalls a party that he and his buddy had attended the night before. He also recalls the people that he met there (including "girls from Argentina and Arkansas / Maine, Alabama, and Panama") as well as his actions (such as lying to others after a few drinks and telling them that he is "a doctor, a lawyer, a senator's son / Brad Pitt's brother, and a man on the run"). In the chorus, he says that "Everybody was some kind of star / When [they] went out last night." Co-written by Brett James and Chesney, it is one of three new tracks on his second greatest hits album Greatest Hits II.

== Critical reception ==
Matt Bjorke of Roughstock gave the song a favorable review. He said that the song had a more traditionally country sound, as it did not include the "amped up guitars" that Chesney's previous summer-themed songs had. Kevin J. Coyne of Country Universe gave the song a B grade, also saying that it had a more traditional production.

Karlie Justus of Engine 145 gave it a "thumbs-down" rating, saying that Chesney's vocal interpretation was "bland" and that the lyrics lacked the humor necessary to make the song work.

== Music video ==
The music video was directed by Shaun Silva, and premiered on CMT on May 1, 2009. The video was filmed at the Raleigh Hotel on South Beach at 1775 Collins Avenue and mainly consists of Chesney and many other people at an island-themed party at night, with people mingling, drinking, hanging out around a campfire and swimming in a large pool. Kenny is shown singing at the campfire with his guitar, wearing his signature cowboy hat, a sleeveless shirt and jeans and is barefoot, and he is also shown singing with his guitar on a diving board, wearing a sleeveless shirt and shorts and is barefoot. The video was voted in at number 42 on GAC's Top 50 Videos of the Year list.

== Use in media ==
The song was featured on the show Cold Case as the finale song in the episode "Two Weddings" that aired on February 28, 2010.

== Charts ==
"Out Last Night" debuted at number 25 on the Billboard Hot Country Songs charts dated for the week of April 11, 2009. The song became Chesney's seventeenth number one hit on the chart week of June 27, 2009 and his fourth consecutive chart-topper.

Weekly chart performance
Chart (2009)	Peak position
US Hot Country Songs (Billboard)	1
US Billboard Hot 100	16
Canada Country (Billboard)	1
Canada Hot 100 (Billboard)	41

=== Year-end charts ===
Annual chart raknings
Chart (2009)	Position
US Country Songs (Billboard)	32
US Radio Songs (Billboard)	68

== Certifications ==
Region	Certification	Certified units/sales
United States (RIAA)	Platinum	1,000,000^{‡}
^{‡} Sales+streaming figures based on certification alone.
