= A Lot of Things Different =

2001 song by Bill Anderson, covered by Kenny Chesney

Song by Bill Anderson

from the album A Lot of Things Different
- Released: August 7, 2001
- Studio: Sony Firehall Studio
- Genre: Country
- Length: 4:08
- Label: TWI; Varèse Sarabande
- Songwriters: Bill Anderson; Dean Dillon
- Producers: Bill Anderson; Rex Schnelle

"A Lot of Things Different" is a song written by American country music singer-songwriter Bill Anderson and songwriter Dean Dillon. It was recorded in two separate versions. The first version was recorded by Anderson himself in 2001. A version by Kenny Chesney appeared one year later on his 2002 album and was later released as a single.

== Bill Anderson version ==
Bill Anderson recorded the original version of "A Lot of Things Different". In 2016, he recalled the experience of writing the song with Dean Dillon. "When we wrote 'A Lot of Things Different' in 2002, I was at the point then that I could look over my shoulder and say, 'Golly, I’d do that different if I had the chance to do that again.' You gain wisdom," he reflected.

Anderson recorded the track at Sony Firehall Studio. It was produced by Anderson in conjunction with Rex Schnelle. The original version was released on Anderson's 2001 album of the same name, which was issued on TWI Records and Varèse Sarabande.

== Kenny Chesney version ==
"A Lot of Things Different"

Single by Kenny Chesney

from the album No Shoes, No Shirt, No Problems
- Released: September 2, 2002
- Recorded: 2002
- Genre: Country
- Length: 4:43
- Label: BNA
- Songwriters: Bill Anderson; Dean Dillon
- Producers: Buddy Cannon; Kenny Chesney; Norro Wilson

Kenny Chesney singles chronology
| "The Good Stuff" (2002) | "A Lot of Things Different" (2002) | "Big Star" (2003) |

"A Lot of Things Different" was recorded by American country artist Kenny Chesney in 2002 and appeared on his album, No Shoes, No Shirt, No Problems.

It was released in September 2002 as the third single from Chesney's album No Shoes, No Shirt, No Problems. The song reached No. 6 on the US Billboard Hot Country Singles & Tracks chart in 2003. Before Chesney's version was released, Anderson had recorded the song on his 2001 album of the same name. Chesney also used his rendition of the song as the B-side to his 2002 single "The Good Stuff".

=== Chart performance ===
"A Lot of Things Different" debuted at No. 60 on the U.S. Billboard Hot Country Singles & Tracks chart for the week of September 7, 2002.

| Chart (2002–2003) | Peak position |
|---|---|
| US Hot Country Songs (Billboard) | 6 |
| US Billboard Hot 100 | 55 |
