= Jillian Jacqueline =

- Also known as: Jillian, Jillian Arciero
- Born: Jillian Jacqueline Arciero; March 8, 1988 (age 38); Chester Springs, Pennsylvania, U.S.
- Origin: Nashville, Tennessee, U.S.
- Genres: Country
- Occupation: Singer-songwriter
- Instrument: Vocals
- Years active: 2001-present
- Labels: Dreamcatcher; Big Loud

Jillian Jacqueline Arciero Brown (born March 8, 1989) is an American country music singer. She made her first chart entry in 2001 as a collaborator with Billy Dean and Suzy Bogguss, and recorded two EPs for Big Loud.

== Biography ==
Jillian Jacqueline Arciero was born and raised in Chester Springs, Pennsylvania. After her family moved to New York City, she began performing at coffeehouses at age seven, and recorded her first album at age eight. In 2000, she was discovered by Kenny Rogers, who included her in a Christmas revue called "Christmas from the Heart". He later booked her as an opening act as well, and signed her to his Dreamcatcher record label. Jacqueline's first chart entry came in 2001, when she and Suzy Bogguss were both featured on Billy Dean's single "Keep Mom and Dad in Love". The single, on which she was credited as "introducing Jillian", charted at number 51 on Billboard Hot Country Songs in May 2001. After this, she formed a band called Little Women Band with her sisters, Olivia, Dominique, and Gabriela. In 2004, the band performed a charity show for the Girl Scouts in Paramus, New Jersey.

She left the band soon afterward in order to attend Philadelphia University. In 2010, she moved to Nashville, Tennessee, to resume her musical career. Meanwhile, her sisters founded the group The Lunabelles, which recorded for BNA Records in 2011. Recording as Jillian Jacqueline, she released the single "Overdue" in 2014. This song featured harmony vocals from Vince Gill and production work by Richard Marx. Although the song received more than a million streams on Spotify, it did not chart. It also led to Jacqueline and Marx co-writing the single "Take Me Down" from Gill's 2018 album Down to My Last Bad Habit.

In 2016, Jacqueline signed with Big Loud, a country music record label. The label issued two extended plays titled Side A and Side B between then and 2017. Side A contained two singles: "Reasons" and "If I Were You", the latter a duet with Keith Urban. "Reasons" peaked at number 53 on Billboard Country Airplay in 2018. Jacqueline exited Big Loud in 2020 and released a single titled "Wait for the Light" independently. This was followed in 2022 by "Magic", which she co-wrote with Shane McAnally and Tofer Brown. Jacqueline's debut album, Honestly was released on June 10, 2022.

== Personal life ==
In 2018, Jacqueline became engaged to Bryan Brown, who is the brother of her record producer Tofer Brown and guitarist in her road band. The couple married in April 2019.

== Discography ==
=== Albums ===
Title	Album details
Honestly	Release date: June 10, 2022; Label: Self-released; Format: CD, digital download

=== Extended plays ===
Title	Album details
Side A	Release date: September 22, 2017; Label: Big Loud
Side B	Release date: September 7, 2018; Label: Big Loud

=== Singles ===
Year	Single	Peak chart positions	
Year	Single	US Country	US Country Airplay
2001	"Keep Mom and Dad in Love" (Billy Dean with Suzy Bogguss and introducing Jillian)	51	
2016	"Overdue"	—	—
2018	"Reasons"	—	53
2018	"If I Were You" (with Keith Urban)	—	—
2020	"Wait for the Light"	—	—
2022	"Magic"	—	—
"—" denotes releases that did not chart
