= Live a Little (song) =

Single by Kenny Chesney

from the album Hemingway's Whiskey
- Released: March 14, 2011
- Recorded: 2010
- Genre: Country
- Length: 3:39 (album version)
- Label: BNA
- Songwriters: David Lee Murphy; Shane Minor
- Producer: Buddy Cannon

Kenny Chesney singles chronology
"Somewhere with You" (2010)	"Live a Little" (2011)	"You and Tequila" (2011)

"Live a Little" is a song written by David Lee Murphy and Shane Minor and recorded by American country music singer Kenny Chesney. It was released in March 2011 as the third single from Chesney's 2010 album Hemingway's Whiskey. The song reached number one on the US Billboard Hot Country Songs chart in May 2011.

== Background and writing ==
Chesney told the Nashville Music Scene that the song defines him as a person. Co-writer David Lee Murphy told The Boot that the two were just sitting around and Minor said he had a good idea for a song called "live a little, love a lot." They wrote the song at the end of summer and Murphy said "we had our windows down, just singing at top of our lungs."

== Critical reception ==
Bill Frisicks-Warren of The Washington Post described the song negatively in his review of the album, saying that "Nothing — not even the singer's self-deprecating, Everyday Joe persona — can redeem [it]."

Karlie Justus of Engine 145 gave it a "thumbs down". She believed that Chesney's singing sounded "uninterested" and that its subject matter was "too similar to other songs of his" and it had a "very similar melody" to his 2005 single "Keg in the Closet".

Stuart Munro of The Boston Globe called the song a "good-timing singalong". A positive review also came from Bobby Peacock of Roughstock, who gave it four stars out of five. His review said that the song was "delightfully unhurried" and that Chesney "has rarely sounded better."

Kevin John Coyne of Country Universe gave the song a C grade, saying that the song starts with a "pure pop/rock intro" and then transitions into acoustic country but eventually "disintegrates to generic Chesney: loud but not assertive, cute but not clever, upbeat but not uplifting."

== Chart performance ==
Chart (2011)	Peak position
US Billboard Hot 100	61
US Hot Country Songs (Billboard)	1
Canada Hot 100 (Billboard)	78
Canada Country (Billboard)	1

=== Year-end charts ===
Chart (2011)	Position
US Country Songs (Billboard)	46

== Certifications ==
Region	Certification	Certified units/sales
United States (RIAA)	Platinum	1,000,000^{‡}
^{‡} Sales+streaming figures based on certification alone.
