= Ain't Back Yet =

Single by Kenny Chesney

from the album Greatest Hits II
- B-side: "This Is Our Moment"
- Released: February 22, 2010
- Recorded: 2009
- Genre: Country
- Length: 4:01 (album version); 3:45 (single edit)
- Label: BNA
- Songwriter(s): Craig Wiseman; Chris Tompkins
- Producer(s): Buddy Cannon; Kenny Chesney

Kenny Chesney singles chronology
"I'm Alive" (2009)	"Ain't Back Yet" (2010)	"The Boys of Fall" (2010)

"Ain't Back Yet" is a song written by Craig Wiseman and Chris Tompkins and recorded by American country music artist Kenny Chesney. The song is included on a re-issue of Chesney's 2009 compilation album Greatest Hits II, and was released as the album's third and final single in February 2010. The song is also played during the end credits to Chesney's 2010 film Summer in 3D. The song peaked at number 3 on the U.S. Billboard Hot Country Songs chart.

== Critical reception ==
The song has received mixed reviews from music critics. Matt Bjorke of Roughstock said that the song "isn't the Buffett-like country tune" but "fits Kenny Chesney like a glove", as it "details quite a bit about what his life has been like since he became that touring musician." Juli Thanki of Engine 145 gave it a "thumbs down", saying that it "sounds like a second rate Jason Aldean song" with an "average vocal performance and bland lyric."

== Music video ==
The accompanying music video for this song was directed by Shaun Silva and Joe Thomas (the director of "Summer In 3D".) It features Chesney performing in concert and shows home videos from his past tours.

== Chart performance ==
On the US Billboard Hot Country Songs charts for the week of February 27, 2010, the song debuted at number 23, and peaked at number 3 in May 2010. On the Canadian Hot 100 charts for the week of April 3, 2010, the song debuted at number 88.

The song's B-side, "This Is Our Moment", charted for seven weeks on Hot Country Songs, peaking at 46 in early 2010.

=== Weekly charts ===
Weekly chart performance for "Ain't Back Yet"
Chart (2010)	Peak position
US Hot Country Songs (Billboard)	3
US Billboard Hot 100	50
Canada Country (Billboard)	2
Canada (Canadian Hot 100)	72

=== Year-end charts ===
Year-end chart performance for "Ain't Back Yet"
Chart (2010)	Position
US Hot Country Songs (Billboard)	33
