= The Road and the Radio =

Studio album by Kenny Chesney
- Released: November 8, 2005
- Recorded: 2005
- Studios: Emerald Sound (Nashville, Tennessee); Westwood (Nashville, Tennessee)
- Genre: Country
- Length: 46:53
- Label: BNA
- Producers: Buddy Cannon; Kenny Chesney

Kenny Chesney chronology
Be as You Are (Songs from an Old Blue Chair) (2005)	The Road and the Radio (2005)	Live: Live Those Songs Again (2006)

Singles from The Road and the Radio
- 1. "Who You'd Be Today" Released: September 12, 2005; 2. "Living in Fast Forward" Released: January 9, 2006; 3. "Summertime" Released: April 11, 2006; 4. "You Save Me" Released: August 14, 2006; 5. "Beer in Mexico" Released: January 8, 2007

Professional ratings
Aggregate scores
Source	Rating
Metacritic	(57/100)
Review scores
Source	Rating
About.com	4.5/5 stars
Allmusic	3/5 stars
BBC Music	(unfavorable)
Billboard	(positive)
Blender	2/5 stars
Chicago Tribune	2/4 stars
E! Online	B−
Los Angeles Times	2.5/4 stars
Rolling Stone	3/5 stars
Stylus Magazine	C−

The Road and the Radio is the tenth studio album by American country music artist Kenny Chesney. It was released on November 8, 2005, through BNA Records. The album debuted at number one on the US Top Country Albums and US Billboard 200 charts.

== Singles ==
The album produced five singles between 2005 and 2007 with the songs "Who You'd Be Today", "Living in Fast Forward", "Summertime", "You Save Me", and "Beer in Mexico". All singles made it to the Top 10 on the U.S. Billboard Hot Country Songs chart. "Living in Fast Forward", "Summertime", and "Beer in Mexico" all reached number one. "Who You'd Be Today" peaked at number 2, and "You Save Me" went to number 3.

== Commercial performance ==
The album debuted at number one on the Billboard 200 with first week sales of 470,000 copies.

== Track listing ==
No.	Title	Writer(s)	Length
1.	"The Road and the Radio"	Kenny Chesney; Casey Beathard	5:11
2.	"Living in Fast Forward"	David Lee Murphy; Rivers Rutherford	3:34
3.	"Who You'd Be Today"	Bill Luther; Aimee Mayo	4:16
4.	"You Save Me"	Brett James; Troy Verges	3:58
5.	"Summertime"	Craig Wiseman; Steve McEwan	3:26
6.	"In a Small Town"	Jon McElroy; Cory Mayo	4:15
7.	"Beer in Mexico"	Chesney	4:33
8.	"Freedom"	Luther; Tom Douglas	4:41
9.	"Tequila Loves Me"	McElroy; Arnie Roman	4:09
10.	"Somebody Take Me Home"	Radney Foster; Randy Rogers	3:35
11.	"Like Me"	Troy Jones	5:15
Total length:			46:53

Target Stores bonus tracks
No.	Title	Writer(s)	Length
12.	"Brandy (You're a Fine Girl)"	Elliot Lurie
13.	"In This Boat Alone"	Chesney
14.	"Flip Flop Summer"	Chesney
15.	"Old Bird Dog"	Luther; Rhett Akins

== Personnel ==
Compiled in liner notes

- Jeff Bailey - trumpet
- Wyatt Beard - piano, background vocals
- Pat Buchanan - electric guitar
- Buddy Cannon - background vocals
- Melonie Cannon - background vocals
- Kenny Chesney - lead vocals
- J. T. Corenflos - electric guitar
- Chad Cromwell - drums
- Dan Dugmore - steel guitar
- Chris Dunn - trombone
- Kenny Greenberg - acoustic guitar, electric guitar
- Rob Hajacos - fiddle
- Tim Hensley - banjo, ukulele, background vocals
- Steve Hinson - steel guitar
- John Hobbs - piano, keyboards, B3 organ, synthesizer
- Jim Horn - baritone saxophone
- Mike Johnson - steel guitar
- John Jorgenson - acoustic guitar, electric guitar, baritone guitar
- Paul Leim - drums, percussion
- Samuel B. Levine - tenor saxophone
- B. James Lowry - acoustic guitar, electric guitar, nylon string guitar
- Randy McCormick - piano, keyboards, B3 organ, Wurlitzer electric piano
- Steve Nathan - synthesizer
- Steve Patrick - trumpet
- Larry Paxton - bass guitar
- Michael Rhodes - bass guitar
- John Willis - acoustic guitar, nylon string guitar, banjo

== Charts ==
=== Weekly charts ===
Chart (2005)	Peak position
US Billboard 200	1
US Top Country Albums (Billboard)	1

=== Year-end charts ===
Chart (2005)	Position
US Billboard 200	138
US Top Country Albums (Billboard)	24
Worldwide Albums (IFPI)	22
Chart (2006)	Position
US Billboard 200	8
US Top Country Albums (Billboard)	3
Chart (2007)	Position
US Billboard 200	164
US Top Country Albums (Billboard)	35

== Certifications ==
Region	Certification	Certified units/sales
United States (RIAA)	4× Platinum	4,000,000^{‡}
^{‡} Sales+streaming figures based on certification alone.
