= Bobbie Cryner (album) =

Studio album by Bobbie Cryner
- Released: 1993
- Genre: Country
- Length: 33:10
- Label: Epic
- Producer: Doug Johnson, Carl Jackson

Bobbie Cryner chronology
Bobbie Cryner (1993)	Girl of Your Dreams (1996)

Professional ratings
Review scores
Source	Rating
AllMusic	4/5 stars
Chicago Tribune	3.5/4 stars
Christgau's Consumer Guide	A–
Entertainment Weekly	A–
Los Angeles Times	(favorable)

Bobbie Cryner is the self-titled debut of country music singer-songwriter Bobbie Cryner. It was released on Epic Records in 1993. It features 10 songs; three of them are from outside writers, two are co-writers, and the rest are self-penned.

It featured three charting singles: "Daddy Laid The Blues On Me" which charted at 63 in 1993, "He Feels Guilty", which charted at 68 in 1993, and "You Could Steal Me" which got as high as 72 in 1994. Also included on the disc is a cover of the Buck Owens song, "I Don't Care", included here as a duet with Dwight Yoakam.

== Track listing ==
1. "He Feels Guilty" (Tommy Polk, Verlon Thompson) — 3:43
2. "Too Many Tears Too Late" (Carl Jackson, Jim Weatherly) — 3:32
3. "Daddy Laid The Blues On Me" (Bobbie Cryner) — 3:25
4. "I Think It's Over Now" (Cryner) — 3:30
5. "Leavin' Houston Blues" (Cryner) — 3:39
6. "I Don't Care" (duet with Dwight Yoakam) (Buck Owens) — 2:07
7. "You Could Steal Me" (Cryner, Jesse Hunter) — 2:56
8. "I'm Through Waitin' On You" (Cryner, Tim Nichols, Zack Turner) — 3:45
9. "The One I Love The Most" (Gene Dobbins, Michael Huffman, Bob Morrison) — 3:07
10. "The Heart Speaks For Itself" (Cryner) — 3:32

== Production ==
- Produced By Doug Johnson & Carl Jackson
- Engineered By Tommy Cooper, Doug Johnson & Pete Magdaleno
- Assistant Engineers: Todd Culross, Gene Rice
- Mixing: Tommy Cooper
- Digital Editing: Don Cobb
- Mastering: Denny Purcell

== Personnel ==
- Drums: Owen Hale
- Bass guitar: Mike Chapman, Dave Pomeroy
- Keyboards: Steve Nathan
- Acoustic Guitar: Carl Jackson
- Electric guitar: Pete Anderson, Steve Gibson, Brent Mason
- Steel Guitar: Bruce Bouton
- Slide Guitar: Bruce Bouton
- Dobro: Bruce Bouton, Jerry Douglas
- Mandolin: Carl Jackson
- Fiddle: Stuart Duncan
- Harmonica: Terry McMillan
- Cello: John Catchings
- Cello Arrangement: Gary Tussing
- Lead Vocals: Bobbie Cryner
- Background Vocals: Emmylou Harris, Carl Jackson, Dwight Yoakam, Andrea Zonn
