= Three Days =

Three Days or 3 Days may refer to:

== Religion ==
- The Three Days: Maundy Thursday, Good Friday, and the Vigil of Easter
- Three day movement

== Film and television ==
=== Film ===
- Three Days (1992 film)
- Three Days (1999 film), a rockumentary of the Jane's Addiction 1997 Relapse tour
- Three Days (2001 film)
- Three Days (2008 film), the Spanish film Tres días by director Francisco Javier Gutiérrez
- Three Days (2011 film)

=== Television ===
- Three Days (TV program), a South Korean documentary program
- Three Days (TV series), a thriller action South Korean television drama

== Music ==
- Three Days (album), by Pat Green
- Three Days (Jane's Addiction song), 1990
- "Three Days" (Willie Nelson song), by Willie Nelson, also recorded by Faron Young 1962 and k.d. lang 1989
- "Three Days", a 1991 song by Toni Childs from House of Hope
- "Three Days", a 2017 song by Dream Theater from The Astonishing
