= The Boys of Fall =

Single by Kenny Chesney

from the album Hemingway's Whiskey
- B-side: "Living in Fast Forward (Live)"
- Released: July 12, 2010
- Recorded: 2010
- Genre: Country
- Length: 6:30 (album version); 4:21 (single edit)
- Label: BNA
- Songwriters: Casey Beathard; Dave Turnbull
- Producers: Buddy Cannon; Kenny Chesney

Kenny Chesney singles chronology
| "Ain't Back Yet" (2010) | "The Boys of Fall" (2010) | "Somewhere with You" (2010) |

"The Boys of Fall" is a song written by Casey Beathard and Dave Turnbull, and recorded by American country music artist Kenny Chesney. It was released in July 2010 as the first single from Chesney's album Hemingway's Whiskey.

== Content ==
The lyrics are about playing high school football. Chesney says the song "is a perfect description of how I grew up and where I grew up".

== Critical reception ==
Matt Bjorke of Roughstock gave the song a four-out-of-five stars review, saying that if the song "is an indication as to where Hemingway's Whiskey is going," he predicts that Chesney has a "monster of an upcoming album". CM Wilcox of The 9513 gave the song a thumbs-down, calling it "somber and evocative" but adding, "you’ll have to listen pretty closely for the nuances that make this a cut above your average Chesney nostalgia song."

== Music video ==
The music video debuted on August 2, 2010 on ESPN's SportsCenter. It features many famous football players and coaches talking about their experiences playing high school football and advice they would give to kids, as well as clips of famous players and coaches from the college and professional ranks, past and present including Chesney's longtime friend Sean Payton. Directed by Shaun Silva, the video is over eight minutes in length.

Much of this video was shot in and around Celina, Texas, specifically at Celina High School's prior football stadium (Celina High is one of the state's dominant football teams, having won or co-won nine state titles). Other scenes were filmed at North Central College in Naperville, Illinois, at the Battle Ground Academy in Franklin, Tennessee, Montgomery Bell Academy in Nashville, Tennessee, and at Gibbs High School in Tennessee, where Chesney played football.

Battle Ground Academy was where songwriter Casey Beathard's son, C. J. Beathard, was playing high school football at the time; the younger Beathard would eventually make it to the NFL as a backup quarterback for the San Francisco 49ers.

== Track listing ==
- CD single
1. "The Boys of Fall" (Single Edit) – 4:21
2. "Living in Fast Forward" (Live) – 3:55

== Charts ==
On the Billboard Hot Country Songs charts dated July 31, 2010, the song debuted at number 17, becoming Chesney's highest debut on the charts since "Don't Blink" debuted at number 16 in September 2007. The song peaked at number 18 on the Billboard Hot 100 pop singles chart in August as the 2010 high school football season commenced across the nation. The song became Chesney's eighteenth Number One single on the country charts for the week of October 9, 2010. With its peak, Chesney had charted at least one Number One song for a ten-year stretch, dating back to 2001.

| Chart (2010) | Peak position |
|---|---|
| US Hot Country Songs (Billboard) | 1 |
| US Billboard Hot 100 | 18 |
| Canada Country (Billboard) | 1 |
| Canada Hot 100 (Billboard) | 77 |

=== Year-end charts ===
| Chart (2010) | Position |
|---|---|
| US Country Songs (Billboard) | 35 |

== Certifications ==
| Region | Certification | Certified units/sales |
|---|---|---|
| United States (RIAA) | 2× Platinum | 2,000,000^{‡} |
^{‡} Sales+streaming figures based on certification alone.
