= You and Tequila =

Single by Kenny Chesney featuring Grace Potter

from the album Hemingway's Whiskey
- Released: May 31, 2011
- Recorded: 2010
- Genre: Country
- Length: 4:03
- Label: BNA
- Songwriters: Matraca Berg; Deana Carter
- Producer: Buddy Cannon

Kenny Chesney singles chronology
"Live a Little" (2011)	"You and Tequila" (2011)	"Reality" (2011)

"You and Tequila" is a song written by Matraca Berg and Deana Carter. Originally recorded by Carter for her fourth album I'm Just a Girl (2003), Kenny Chesney covered the song in 2010 for his thirteenth studio album, Hemingway's Whiskey. It was released in May 2011 as the fourth single from the record. Chesney's version of the song features a guest vocal from Grace Potter, lead singer of Grace Potter and the Nocturnals. On November 30, the song received two nominations in 54th Grammy Awards for Best Country Song and Best Country Duo/Group Performance. A live version of the song appears on Chesney's 2012 album Welcome to the Fishbowl.

== Background and writing ==
Deana Carter and Matraca Berg co-wrote the song, and both recorded their own versions: Carter on her album I'm Just a Girl (2003), and Berg on her 2011 album The Dreaming Fields.

Carter told Taste of Country that Berg was inspired to write the song after having been out on the town. According to Carter, the two began talking about relationships, when Carter said, "Yeah, it's just like men… they get in your blood!" Also, Carter added several references to California, because she was living there at the time.

Chesney first heard the song when he and Carter toured together back in 2003. He said that he identified with it more after he rented a house in Malibu, California. Chesney said that he chose to record the song because it reminded him of driving the Pacific Coast Highway. He also told National Public Radio host David Green that "there are some commonalities about getting someone out of your mind and drinking and trying to quit."

== Song information ==
Chesney and Potter's version of the song is set in the key of G♭ major with a vocal range from G♭2 to E♭4. The main chord pattern is G♭5-G♭/B♭-B♭sus2-G♭5.

== Critical reception ==
Chesney's version of the song has received positive reviews from music critics. Chris Talbott of the Associated Press called it a "melancholy love-hate song", and an uncredited review in HitFix called the song "exquisite" and one of Chesney's "career high notes". Bobby Peacock of Roughstock rated the song four-and-a-half stars out of five, praising Chesney's and Potter's vocals and the "understated simplicity" of the lyrics. Bill Friskics-Warren of The Washington Post thought that the song had an Americana influence and made the album Chesney's "most stylistically wide-ranging to date."

== Music video ==
Potter appears in the song's music video, which was filmed in Malibu, California and directed by Shaun Silva.

== Chart performance ==
=== Weekly charts ===
Chart (2011)	Peak position
Canada Hot 100 (Billboard)	62
Canada Country (Billboard)	5
US Billboard Hot 100	33
US Hot Country Songs (Billboard)	3

=== Year-end charts ===
Chart (2011)	Position
US Country Songs (Billboard)	7
US Billboard Hot 100	98

== Certifications ==
Region	Certification	Certified units/sales
United States (RIAA)	4× Platinum	4,000,000^{‡}
^{‡} Sales+streaming figures based on certification alone.
