= I'm Alive (Willie Nelson song) =

Single by Kenny Chesney with Dave Matthews

from the album Greatest Hits II
- Released: August 17, 2009
- Recorded: 2008
- Genre: Country
- Length: 3:17
- Label: BNA
- Songwriters: Kenny Chesney; Dean Dillon; Mark Tamburino
- Producers: Buddy Cannon; Kenny Chesney

Kenny Chesney singles chronology
"Out Last Night" (2009)	"I'm Alive" (2009)	"Ain't Back Yet" (2010)

Dave Matthews singles chronology
"Eh Hee" (2007)	"I'm Alive" (2009)

"I'm Alive" is a song co-written and recorded by American country music singer Kenny Chesney. He wrote the song with Dean Dillon and Mark Tamburino. The song was originally recorded by Willie Nelson on his album Moment of Forever, which Chesney also produced. Chesney himself later recorded it (as a duet with Dave Matthews) on his 2008 album Lucky Old Sun. This version later appeared on his 2009 compilation album Greatest Hits II, from which it was released to radio as the album's second single in August 2009.

== Song information ==
Willie Nelson first recorded the song on his 2008 album Moment of Forever, which Chesney co-produced. Chesney later recorded the song as a duet with Dave Matthews on Lucky Old Sun (also released in 2008), but did not release it as a single from that album. Chesney told Country Standard Time, "It was never meant to be some kind of a message — except to maybe myself[…]It's one thing when Willie Nelson at 70 sings it, and something totally different when Dave and I do. One is from a place of really knowing; for us, it was more just the fact that we realize it." He also said that he was inspired to write the song after his divorce from actress Renée Zellweger: "Writing that song was a release. It was the best I'd felt in a long time after I wrote that song."

Chesney's version of the song is set in the key of E♭ major, with a vocal range from B♭3 to F5 and a main chord progression of E♭-E♭+/G-A♭-A♭m. It is primarily accompanied by acoustic guitar, organ, and light percussion.

== Critical reception ==
CM Wilcox of The 9513 gave the song a “thumbs-down” review. He said that the song had "somewhat ambitious" lyrics, and made note of Matthews' vocal performance, but said that Chesney sounded like a "workaday singer" and that the duet did not have a sense of interplay between the two vocalists. In his review of Lucky Old Sun, J. Freedom Du Lac of The Washington Post said, "The song is supposed to be an anthem about strength and survival and soldiering on[…]Yet it sounds more like a weary wish than a declaration," and an uncredited review in the Hartford Courant said that it "may be the plainest thing Matthews has ever done." Matt Bjorke of Roughstock gave a favorable review, describing the song as "a genuine reflection[…]about the way they choose to live their lives."

== Chart performance ==
As an album cut from Lucky Old Sun, "I'm Alive" spent one week at number 55 on the U.S. Billboard Hot Country Songs chart. The song later appeared on Chesney's Greatest Hits II compilation a year afterward, and was released in August as that album's second single. It re-entered at number 41 on the same chart dated for the week of August 15, 2009, ahead of the song's announced release date of August 17.

Chart (2008)	Peak position
US Hot Country Songs (Billboard)	55
US Billboard Bubbling Under Hot 100	18
Chart (2009)	Peak position
US Hot Country Songs (Billboard)	6
US Billboard Hot 100	32
Canada Country (Billboard)	6
Canada Hot 100 (Billboard)	73

=== Year-end charts ===
Chart (2009)	Position
US Country Songs (Billboard)	44

== Certifications ==
Region	Certification	Certified units/sales
United States (RIAA)	Gold	500,000^{‡}
^{‡} Sales+streaming figures based on certification alone.
