= The Good Stuff =

Single by Kenny Chesney

from the album No Shoes, No Shirt, No Problems
- B-side: "A Lot of Things Different"
- Released: May 6, 2002
- Recorded: 2001–2002
- Genre: Country
- Length: 3:20
- Label: BNA 69172
- Songwriters: Craig Wiseman; Jim Collins
- Producers: Buddy Cannon; Kenny Chesney; Norro Wilson

Kenny Chesney singles chronology
"Young" (2001)	"The Good Stuff" (2002)	"A Lot of Things Different" (2002)

"The Good Stuff" is a song written by Jim Collins and Craig Wiseman and recorded by the American country music artist Kenny Chesney. It was released in May 2002 as the second single from Chesney's 2002 album No Shoes, No Shirt, No Problems.

The song was Chesney's fifth number one hit on the US Billboard Hot Country Singles & Tracks charts. At the time, it was also his longest-lasting number one, spending seven weeks at that position (a record that has since been tied by his 2003 single "There Goes My Life"). The song also reached number 22 on the Billboard Hot 100. It was named the number one country single of 2002 according to Billboard Year End.

== Content ==
"The Good Stuff" is a mid-tempo song based on different meanings of the phrase "the good stuff". In the first verse, the narrator explains that he has just had a fight with his wife, so he goes to a bar. Seeing only the bartender in the bar, he then asks for "the good stuff" (i.e., a good alcoholic beverage). The bartender then explains that the "good stuff", which cannot be found at the bar, is the love between a man and woman, and the memories that they make together, such as "dropping the ring in the spaghetti plate".

In the second verse, the narrator and the bartender begin conversing, when the narrator notices a picture on the bar. The bartender explains that the picture is of his wife who died of cancer eight years ago. He also says that for five years after her death, he began drinking regularly, sobering up only after realizing that the memories of the love that they shared are "the one thing stronger than the whiskey".

The bartender, in the song's bridge, then suggests that the male go home and apologize to his wife. "When you get home, she'll start to cry / When she says 'I'm sorry', say 'so am I' / Look into those eyes so deep in love / And drink it up / 'Cause that's the good stuff".

== Music video ==
The music video was directed by Shaun Silva and was premiered on CMT on April 25, 2002, when CMT named it a "Hot Shot". It consisted of Chesney performing the song in a recording studio, as well as singing in front of a wall containing a few pictures, and shows him at a bar talking to the bartender, which is played by his good friend and manager, Dale Morris.

== Chart positions ==
"The Good Stuff" debuted at number 53 on the U.S. Billboard Hot Country Singles & Tracks chart for the week of May 4, 2002.

Chart (2002)	Peak position
US Hot Country Songs (Billboard)	1
US Billboard Hot 100	22

=== Year-end charts ===
Chart (2002)	Position
US Country Songs (Billboard)	1
US Billboard Hot 100	82

== Certifications ==
Region	Certification	Certified units/sales
United States (RIAA)	2× Platinum	2,000,000^{‡}
^{‡} Sales+streaming figures based on certification alone.
