= Young (Kenny Chesney song) =

Single by Kenny Chesney

from the album No Shoes, No Shirt, No Problems
- B-side: "For the First Time"
- Released: December 31, 2001
- Recorded: 2001
- Genre: Country
- Length: 3:55
- Label: BNA
- Songwriters: Craig Wiseman; Naoise Sheridan; Steve McEwan
- Producers: Buddy Cannon; Kenny Chesney; Norro Wilson

Kenny Chesney singles chronology
"The Tin Man" (2001)	"Young" (2001)	"The Good Stuff" (2002)

"Young" is a song written by Naoise Sheridan, Steve McEwan, and Craig Wiseman and recorded by American country music singer Kenny Chesney. It was released on December 31, 2001 as the lead single from Chesney's 2002 album No Shoes, No Shirt, No Problems. The song peaked at number 2 on the US Billboard Hot Country Singles & Tracks chart and at number 35 on the U.S. Billboard Hot 100.

== Music video ==
The music video was Chesney's first of many videos that were directed by Shaun Silva, produced by Steve Gainer, and edited by Scott Mele. It premiered on CMT on January 4, 2002, when CMT named it a "Hot Shot". It was filmed in Sanford, Florida, at the old bridge over the St. Johns River, and on the banks of the river.

The music video won the first MTV Video Music Award for Best Country, then known as the CMT Flameworthy Video of the Year, in 2002.

== Chart positions ==
"Young" debuted at number 50 on the U.S. Billboard Hot Country Singles & Tracks chart for the week of December 29, 2001.

Chart (2001–2002)	Peak position
US Hot Country Songs (Billboard)	2
US Billboard Hot 100	35

=== Year-end charts ===
Chart (2002)	Position
US Country Songs (Billboard)	19

== Certifications ==
Certifications for Young
Region	Certification	Certified units/sales
United States (RIAA)	Platinum	1,000,000^{‡}
^{‡} Sales+streaming figures based on certification alone.
