= Susan Haynes =

American musician

- Born: June 13, 1972 (age 53)
- Origin: Atlanta, Georgia, United States
- Genres: Country
- Occupation: Singer-songwriter
- Instrument: Vocals
- Years active: 2005–present
- Labels: Epic

Susan Haynes (born 1972 in Atlanta, Georgia) is an American country music artist. Signed to Epic Records Nashvillein 2005, she released two singles for the label, including "Drinkin' in My Sunday Dress", which peaked at No. 51 on the country singles charts late that year. A self-titled album was released only to digital retailers.

== Biography ==
Susan Haynes was raised in Atlanta, Georgia. After graduating The Lovett School, Haynes moved to Nashville, Tennessee, where she attended college. She also found work as an intern for BNA Records, and later managed a studio for record producer James Stroud. Even then, she did not consider pursuing a career as a singer until age 27.

Producer Dann Huff agreed to work with Haynes, although his own busy production schedule left time for Haynes to continue working on her songwriting. By 2005, she began work on her album, which he and Mark Wright produced. Its lead-off single "Crooked Little Heart" failed to chart, but a cover of Maria McKee's "Drinkin' in My Sunday Dress" peaked at No. 51 on the Billboard charts in 2005. Following the latter single, Haynes' album was released only to digital retailers. "Not That Bad" was scheduled to be released as her third single. After the Nashville division of Epic Records was closed in May 2006, Haynes exited the label.

== Discography ==
=== Albums ===
Title	Album details
Crooked Little Heart	Release date: February 14, 2006; Label: Epic Records; Format: music download

=== Singles ===
Year	Single	Peak positions	Album
Year	Single	US Country	Album
2005	"Crooked Little Heart"	—	Crooked Little Heart
2005	"Drinkin' in My Sunday Dress"	51	Crooked Little Heart
"—" denotes releases that did not chart

=== Music videos ===
Year	Video	Director
2005	"Drinkin' in My Sunday Dress"	Brent Hedgecock
