= Moment of Forever =

Studio album by Willie Nelson
- Released: January 29, 2008
- Genres: Country, outlaw country
- Label: Lost Highway
- Producers: Kenny Chesney, Buddy Cannon

Willie Nelson chronology
It's Magic (2007)	Moment of Forever (2008)	Willie and the Wheel (2009)

Moment of Forever is the 56th studio album by American country music artist Willie Nelson, released on January 29, 2008, on the Lost Highway Records label. A video has been made for the album's first single "Gravedigger", and another video has been made for the track "You Don't Think I'm Funny Anymore", featuring Jessica Simpson, Owen Wilson, Woody Harrelson, Luke Wilson, and Dan Rather. The latter video premiered on the weekend of February 23–24 on MTV.

The title track, " Moment of Forever", is a cover of a song written by Kris Kristofferson and Danny Timms. "The Bob Song" was originally recorded by Big & Rich for their CD/DVD set, Big & Rich's Super Galactic Fan Pak. "Louisiana" is a cover of a Randy Newman song. "Gravedigger" is a cover of the Dave Matthews song. "Keep Me From Blowing Away" is a cover of the Paul Craft song. "I'm Alive" was also recorded by Kenny Chesney on his album Lucky Old Sun. "Gotta Serve Somebody" is a Bob Dylan cover. This was Willie Nelson's final studio album to be released under the Lost Highway Records label as he would go on to sign a new contract with Sony Music.

Professional ratings
Review scores
Source	Rating
AllMusic	link
Fort Worth Star-Telegram	link
Rolling Stone	link
Slant Magazine	link

== Track listing ==
1. "Over You Again" (Willie Nelson, Micah Nelson, Lukas Nelson) - 5:35
2. "Moment of Forever" (Kris Kristofferson, Danny Timms) - 3:50
3. "The Bob Song" (Big Kenny Alphin) - 4:15
4. "Louisiana" (Randy Newman) - 3:25
5. "Gravedigger" (Dave Matthews) - 3:52
6. "Keep Me From Blowing Away" (Paul Craft) - 3:33
7. "Takin' on Water" (Dave Loggins, John Scott Sherrill, Dennis Robbins) - 3:24
8. "Always Now" (W. Nelson) - 3:28
9. "I'm Alive" (Kenny Chesney, Dean Dillon, Mark Tamburino) - 3:27
10. "When I Was Young and Grandma Wasn't Old" (Buddy Cannon) - 3:05
11. "Worry B Gone" (Guy Clark, Gary Nicholson, Lee Roy Parnell) - 3:10
  - Duet with Kenny Chesney
12. "You Don't Think I'm Funny Anymore" (W. Nelson) - 2:21
13. "Gotta Serve Somebody" (Bob Dylan) - 9:46

== Double LP vinyl ==
On January 29, 2008, Lost Highway released Moment of Forever on double LP vinyl pressed at Nashville's historic United Record Pressing. It has three sides of music, and side 4 is a holographic image in the vinyl of Willie Nelson and the album title.

Side A

1. "Over You Again" (Willie Nelson, Micah Nelson, Lukas Nelson) - 5:35
2. "Moment of Forever" (Kris Kristofferson, Danny Timms) - 3:50
3. "The Bob Song" (Big Kenny) - 4:15
4. "Louisiana" (Randy Newman) - 3:25
5. "Gravedigger" (Dave Matthews) - 3:52

Side B

1. "Keep Me from Blowing Away" (Paul Craft) - 3:33
2. "Takin' on Water" (Dave Loggins, John Scott Sherrill, Dennis Robbins) - 3:24
3. "Always Now" (W. Nelson) - 3:28
4. "I'm Alive" (Kenny Chesney, Dean Dillon, Mark Tamburino) - 3:27
5. "When I Was Young and Grandma Wasn't Old" (Buddy Cannon) - 3:05

Side C

1. "Worry B Gone" (With Kenny Chesney) (Guy Clark, Gary Nicholson, Lee Roy Parnell) - 3:10
2. "You Don't Think I'm Funny Anymore" (W. Nelson) - 2:21
3. "Gotta Serve Somebody" (Bob Dylan) - 9:46

== Personnel ==
- Wyatt Beard - background vocals
- Buddy Cannon - background vocals
- Melonie Cannon - background vocals
- Jim Chapman - background vocals
- Kenny Chesney - duet vocals on "Worry B Gone"
- Eric Darken - percussion
- Chris Dunn - trombone
- Kenny Greenberg - acoustic guitar, electric guitar
- Steve Herman - trumpet
- John Hobbs - keyboards, piano
- Jim Horn - horn arrangements, baritone saxophone, tenor saxophone
- Paul Leim - drums, percussion
- Sam Levine - tenor saxophone
- Randy McCormick - keyboards, Hammond organ, piano
- Willie Nelson - acoustic guitar, synthesizer, lead vocals
- Larry Paxton - bass guitar, upright bass, cello, fretless bass guitar, sousaphone
- Gary Prim - Hammond organ, piano
- Mickey Raphael - harmonica
- Tim Stafford - acoustic guitar
- Mark Tamburino - background vocals
- Quentin Ware - trumpet
- John Willis - acoustic guitar, gut string guitar

== Chart performance ==
Chart (2008)	Peak position
Billboard 200	56
Top Country Albums, Billboard	8
