= Summertime (Kenny Chesney song) =

Single by Kenny Chesney

from the album The Road and the Radio
- Released: April 10, 2006
- Recorded: 2005
- Genre: Country
- Length: 3:26 (album version); 3:07 (single version)
- Label: BNA
- Songwriters: Craig Wiseman; Steve McEwan
- Producers: Buddy Cannon; Kenny Chesney

Kenny Chesney singles chronology
"Living in Fast Forward" (2006)	"Summertime" (2006)	"You Save Me" (2006)

"Summertime" is a song written by Craig Wiseman and Steve McEwan and recorded by American country music artist Kenny Chesney. It was released in April 2006 as the third single from Chesney’s 2005 album The Road and the Radio. The song reached number one on the U.S. Billboard Hot Country Songs chart.

== Background and writing ==
Co-writer Craig Wiseman told The Boot that he and McEwan had been working on "My Old Friend" for Tim McGraw until he took a break from writing and went out on the back steps of his office. Wiseman said, "It was that first night when it stays warm, and you can smell the grass growing. I walked outside and was like, 'Man ... summertime! Smell that!' It was that first warm night of summer. It was great." He also said that the next day he was driving in to write with Steve and he couldn't stop saying "Summertime!". Once he got to the office he pulled up a drumbeat and kept saying it. Wiseman said that he didn't originally want to call the song 'Summertime' because he wanted to be original, but he just kept coming back to that title.

== Content ==
The song talks about many different activities that take place in the summer.

== Music video ==
The music video premiered on CMT on February 8, 2007. The video was shot at various concerts, and was directed by Chesney and Shaun Silva. It was also Chesney's directorial debut.

== Chart performance ==
"Summertime" charted for one week at number 60 on the Hot Country Songs chart dated for November 26, 2005. It re-entered at number 31 on the U.S. Billboard Hot Country Songs chart for the week of April 15, 2006. It reached number one on June 17, 2006 and remained there for five consecutive weeks until it was knocked off by "The World" by Brad Paisley.

Chart (2006)	Peak position
US Hot Country Songs (Billboard)	1
US Billboard Hot 100	34
US Billboard Pop 100	51
Canada Country (Billboard)	1

=== Year-end charts ===
Chart (2006)	Position
US Country Songs (Billboard)	3

== Release history ==
Release dates and format(s) for "Summertime"
Region	Date	Format(s)	Label(s)	Ref.
United States	April 10, 2006	Country radio	BNA	

== Certifications ==
Region	Certification	Certified units/sales
United States (RIAA)	3× Platinum	3,000,000^{‡}
^{‡} Sales+streaming figures based on certification alone.
