= No Shoes, No Shirt, No Problems =

Studio album by Kenny Chesney
- Released: April 23, 2002
- Recorded: 2001–2002
- Studios: Emerald Sound (Nashville, Tennessee); Seventeen Grand (Nashville, Tennessee); Sound Stage (Nashville, Tennessee); Sound Shop (Nashville, Tennessee)
- Genre: Country
- Length: 49:27
- Label: BNA
- Producers: Buddy Cannon; Kenny Chesney; Norro Wilson

Kenny Chesney chronology
Greatest Hits (2000)	No Shoes, No Shirt, No Problems (2002)	All I Want for Christmas Is a Real Good Tan (2003)

Singles from No Shoes, No Shirt, No Problems
- 1. "Young" Released: December 31, 2001; 2. "The Good Stuff" Released: May 6, 2002; 3. "A Lot of Things Different" Released: September 2, 2002; 4. "Big Star" Released: January 20, 2003; 5. "No Shoes, No Shirt, No Problems" Released: May 26, 2003

Professional ratings
Review scores
Source	Rating
About.com	4.5/5 stars
AllMusic	5/5 stars
Country Weekly	(favorable)
Entertainment Weekly	B−
People	(average)
Plugged In (publication)	(mixed)
Rolling Stone	2.5/5 stars

No Shoes, No Shirt, No Problems is the sixth studio album by American country music singer Kenny Chesney. It was released in April 2002 via BNA Records. It became Chesney's first album to reach number one on the U.S. Billboard 200 and produced five singles on the Billboard Hot Country Songs chart between 2001 and 2003 with "Young" (number 2), "The Good Stuff" (number one), "A Lot of Things Different" (number 6), "Big Star" (number 2), and the title track (number 2). A live performance music video was made for "Live Those Songs", which charted at number 60 without being released as a single; the song also became a concert tour opener for Chesney for several years. "On the Coast of Somewhere Beautiful" was also made into a music video, without being released as a single. "The Good Stuff" was the biggest hit of Chesney's career at the time, not only spending seven weeks at the top of the country charts, but also becoming Billboard's Number One country single of 2002 according to Billboard Year-End. In 2004, the album was certified quadruple platinum by the Recording Industry Association of America (RIAA) for sales of over four million copies in the United States.

"A Lot of Things Different" was previously recorded by Bill Anderson on his 2001 album of the same name.

== Track listing ==
No.	Title	Writer(s)	Length
1.	"Young"	Craig Wiseman; Naoise Sheridan; Steve McEwan	3:56
2.	"I Remember"	Brad Crisler; James LeBlanc	4:52
3.	"A Lot of Things Different"	Bill Anderson; Dean Dillon	4:43
4.	"The Good Stuff"	Wiseman; Jim Collins	3:20
5.	"Big Star"	Stephony Smith	3:59
6.	"On the Coast of Somewhere Beautiful"	LuAnn Reid; Bill Luther; Danny Simpson	3:34
7.	"Never Gonna Feel Like That Again"	Paul Overstreet; Phillip Coleman	3:53
8.	"Dreams"	Skip Ewing; Kenny Chesney	4:11
9.	"No Shoes, No Shirt, No Problems"	Casey Beathard	3:31
10.	"Live Those Songs"	Chris Bain; Cole Deggs; David Lowe	3:50
11.	"One Step Up"	Bruce Springsteen	5:53
12.	"I Can't Go There" (acoustic version)	Ewing; Chesney	3:45
Total length:			49:27

Deluxe edition
No.	Title	Writer(s)	Length
13.	"No Shoes, No Shirt, No Problems" (single version)	Beathard	2:55
Total length:			52:22

== Personnel ==
As listed in liner notes.

- Wyatt Beard – piano, background vocals (all tracks except 10 and 12)
- David Briggs – synthesizer
- Pat Buchanan – electric guitar
- Larry Byrom – acoustic guitar
- Melonie Cannon – vocals
- Mark Casstevens – electric guitar, ukulele
- Kenny Chesney – lead vocals
- Dan Dugmore – steel guitar
- Glen Duncan – fiddle
- Sonny Garrish – steel guitar
- Larry Franklin – fiddle
- Rob Hajacos – fiddle
- Tim Hensley – acoustic guitar, banjo, background vocals (tracks 1,4,5,6,7,11)
- Wes Hightower – background vocals (tracks 8,10)
- John Hobbs – piano, Hammond B-3 organ, synthesizer
- Nicholas Hoffman – fiddle
- John Jorgenson – electric guitar
- Paul Leim – drums, percussion, tambourine
- B. James Lowry – acoustic guitar, electric guitar, gut string guitar
- Randy McCormick – piano, Hammond B-3 organ, synthesizer
- Tim McGraw – vocals on track 12 (uncredited)
- Liana Manis – background vocals (tracks 2,7,8)
- Steve Marshall – bass guitar
- Brent Mason – acoustic guitar, electric guitar
- Clayton Mitchell – electric guitar
- Steve Nathan – piano, Hammond B-3 organ, synthesizer
- Dale Oliver – electric guitar
- Sean Paddock – drums
- Larry Paxton – bass guitar
- Gary Prim – piano, synthesizer
- Michael Rhodes – bass guitar
- Sunny Russ – background vocals (track 11)
- John Willis – electric guitar

== Charts ==
=== Weekly charts ===
Weekly chart performance for No Shoes, No Shirt, No Problems
Chart (2002)	Peak position
US Billboard 200	1
US Top Country Albums (Billboard)	1

=== Year-end charts ===
Year-end chart performance for No Shoes, No Shirt, No Problems
Chart (2002)	Position
Canadian Albums (Nielsen SoundScan)	169
Canadian Country Albums (Nielsen SoundScan)	11
US Billboard 200	32
US Top Country Albums (Billboard)	5
Worldwide Albums (IFPI)	42

Chart (2003)	Position
US Billboard 200	47
US Top Country Albums (Billboard)	8

Chart (2004)	Position
US Billboard 200	162
US Top Country Albums (Billboard)	29

== Certifications ==
Certifications for No Shoes, No Shirt, No Problems
Region	Certification	Certified units/sales
United States (RIAA)	5× Platinum	5,000,000^{‡}
^{‡} Sales+streaming figures based on certification alone.
