= Living in Fast Forward =

Song by Kenny Chesney

- CD single cover, with Universal Music logo

Single by Kenny Chesney

from the album The Road and the Radio
- Released: January 9, 2006
- Recorded: 2005
- Genre: Country
- Length: 3:31
- Label: BNA; Universal
- Songwriters: David Lee Murphy; Rivers Rutherford
- Producers: Buddy Cannon; Kenny Chesney

Kenny Chesney singles chronology
"Who You'd Be Today" (2005)	"Living in Fast Forward" (2006)	"Summertime" (2006)

Music video
- "Living in Fast Forward" on YouTube

"Living In Fast Forward" is a song written by David Lee Murphy and Rivers Rutherford, and recorded by American country music singer Kenny Chesney that reached the top of the Billboard Hot Country Songs chart. It was released in January 2006 as the second single from Chesney's album The Road and the Radio. It is also featured as a selectable track on the Hollywood Rip Ride Rockit roller coaster at Universal Studios Florida.

== Background and content ==
Chesney says the song "defines how I've lived my life in the last several years. Because it has happened so quick. And I say it's happened so quick. I mean, I've been doing it for 12 years. But the last four to five years, it's been an amazing thing to live through and to see happen to you and to see your fan base grow to a point where it's unbelievable to stand in front of that microphone every night and see how passionate they are about your music. ... More importantly, how much fun they're having with it ... out in the parking lots before the show and during the show. It's everything I ever dreamed of and more."

== Music video ==
The music video was directed by Shaun Silva and premiered on CMT on December 1, 2005. This video was filmed on tour, but while the former shows the actual show, this one is more of the behind-the-scenes.

== Chart positions ==
"Living in Fast Forward" debuted at number 54 on the U.S. Billboard Hot Country Songs chart for the week of November 19, 2005.

Chart (2006)	Peak position
Canada Country (Radio & Records)	1
US Hot Country Songs (Billboard)	1
US Billboard Hot 100	48

=== Year-end charts ===
Chart (2006)	Position
US Country Songs (Billboard)	28

== Certifications ==
Region	Certification	Certified units/sales
United States (RIAA)	Gold	500,000^{‡}
^{‡} Sales+streaming figures based on certification alone.
