= Lucky Old Sun =

Studio album by Kenny Chesney
- Released: October 14, 2008
- Recorded: 2007–08
- Studios: Emerald Studio A, Masterfonics, Sound Emporium, East Iris Studios. Additional Recording at The Tracking Room, Catacomb Studio, Working Class Industry, The Tone Dock, Westwood Sound Studios, Starstruck Studios and Love Shack Studios. The Wailers recorded at A Time and Place Bar in Jamaica
- Genre: Country
- Length: 43:28
- Labels: Blue Chair, BNA
- Producers: Buddy Cannon; Kenny Chesney

Kenny Chesney chronology
Super Hits (2008)	Lucky Old Sun (2008)	Greatest Hits II (2009)

Singles from Lucky Old Sun
- 1. "Everybody Wants to Go to Heaven" Released: August 11, 2008; 2. "Down the Road" Released: November 10, 2008

Professional ratings
Aggregate scores
Source	Rating
Metacritic	60/100
Review scores
Source	Rating
About.com	4/5 stars
AllMusic	2/5 stars
BBC Music	mixed
Billboard	favorable
The Boston Globe	positive
Entertainment Weekly	B
Los Angeles Times	2.5/4 stars
The New York Times	(positive)
PopMatters	6/10 stars
Slant	1/5 stars

Lucky Old Sun is the twelfth studio album by American country music artist Kenny Chesney. It was released on October 14, 2008 as the first release for Blue Chair Records, Chesney's personal division of the BNA Records record label. The album produced two singles in "Everybody Wants to Go to Heaven" and "Down the Road", which were both number ones on the country charts. Chesney's versions of those two songs are duets with The Wailers and Mac McAnally respectively. This was Kenny's first album since 1997's I Will Stand to not have a Top 40 hit on the Billboard Hot 100 chart.

== Content ==
The lead-off single, "Everybody Wants to Go to Heaven", was released on August 11, 2008. In October, this song became a Number One hit on the Billboard country charts. The next single, "Down the Road", is a duet with Mac McAnally. McAnally had previously released this a single for himself from his 1990 album Simple Life. This rendition has also reached Number One.

Two of this album's songs were previously recorded by Willie Nelson: "Ten with a Two" was previously a single in 1990 from his album Born for Trouble and "I'm Alive" was recorded on his album Moment of Forever. "That Lucky Old Sun", recorded as a duet with Nelson, is a cover of the 1949 pop standard made famous by Frankie Laine. Chesney's version of "I'm Alive", a duet with Dave Matthews, also appears on his 2009 compilation album Greatest Hits II, from which it was released as its second single in August 2009.

== Commercial performance ==
Lucky Old Sun debuted at number one on the US Billboard 200 selling 176,000 copies in its first week. It was also his fifth consecutive album to top the US Top Country Albums chart. As of July 2009, the album sold 720,000 copies in United States. On February 13, 2017, the album was certified platinum by the Recording Industry Association of America (RIAA) for sales of a million copies in the United States.

== Track listing ==
No.	Title	Writer(s)	Length
1.	"I'm Alive" (duet with Dave Matthews)	Kenny Chesney, Dean Dillon, Mark Tamburino	3:19
2.	"Way Down Here"	Chesney, Casey Beathard, Tony Martin	5:52
3.	"Boats"	Chesney, Dillon, Scotty Emerick	4:36
4.	"Everybody Wants to Go to Heaven" (featuring The Wailers)	Jim Collins, Marty Dodson	4:13
5.	"Down the Road" (duet with Mac McAnally)	Mac McAnally	3:01
6.	"Spirit of a Storm"	Chesney, Brett James	3:36
7.	"Ten with a Two"	Jack Mack, Bill Nosworthy, Bo Roberts, Mack Vickery	3:11
8.	"The Life"	Beathard, James T. Slater	4:27
9.	"Key's in the Conch Shell"	Aaron Barker, Dillon, Emerick, Tom Gross	4:11
10.	"Nowhere to Go, Nowhere to Be"	Chesney	3:41
11.	"That Lucky Old Sun (Just Rolls Around Heaven All Day)" (duet with Willie Nelson)	Beasley Smith, Haven Gillespie	4:15
Total length:			43:28

Deluxe Edition bonus tracks
No.	Title	Writer(s)	Length
12.	"Boston" (live)	Chesney, Tamburino	5:22
13.	"Got a Little Crazy" (live)	Chesney, Chris Wallin	4:58
14.	"Soul of a Sailor" (live)	Chesney, Dillon, Emerick	5:40
15.	"Guitars and Tiki Bars" (live)	Chesney, Dillon, Tamburino	4:11

== Personnel ==
As listed in liner notes

- Wyatt Beard – background vocals
- Pat Buchanan – electric guitar
- Buddy Cannon – background vocals
- Kenny Chesney – acoustic guitar, lead vocals
- Eric Darken – percussion
- Scott Ducaj – trumpet
- Chris Dunn – trombone
- Kenny Greenberg – electric guitar
- Robert Greenidge – steel drums
- Tim Hensley – background vocals
- Steve Herrman – trumpet
- Steve Hinson – steel guitar
- John Hobbs – piano, synthesizer, Wurlitzer
- Jim Horn – tenor saxophone
- Paul Leim – drums
- B. James Lowry – acoustic guitar
- Mac McAnally – acoustic guitar and duet vocals on "Down the Road"
- Randy McCormick – B3 organ, synthesizer
- Dave Matthews – vocals on "I'm Alive"
- Willie Nelson – vocals on "That Lucky Old Sun (Just Rolls Around Heaven All Day)"
- Larry Paxton – bass guitar, gut string guitar
- Mickey Raphael – harmonica
- Gary Prim – piano, synthesizer, Wurlitzer
- The Wailers – vocals on "Everybody Wants to Go to Heaven"
- John Willis – acoustic guitar, electric guitar, gut string guitar
- Lonnie Wilson – drums

== Charts ==
=== Weekly charts ===
Chart (2008)	Peak position
Australian Albums (ARIA)	108
Australian Country Albums (ARIA)	9
Canadian Albums (Billboard)	10
US Billboard 200	1
US Top Country Albums (Billboard)	1

=== Year-end charts ===
Chart (2008)	Position
Australian Country Albums (ARIA)	50
US Billboard 200	111
US Top Country Albums (Billboard)	21

Chart (2009)	Position
US Billboard 200	89
US Top Country Albums (Billboard)	18

== Certifications ==
Region	Certification	Certified units/sales
United States (RIAA)	Platinum	1,000,000^{‡}
^{‡} Sales+streaming figures based on certification alone.
