= Everybody Wants to Go to Heaven =

Single by Kenny Chesney with The Wailers

from the album Lucky Old Sun
- Released: August 11, 2008
- Recorded: 2008
- Genre: Country
- Length: 4:17 (album version); 2:40 (radio edit)
- Label: Blue Chair/BNA
- Songwriters: Jim Collins; Marty Dodson
- Producers: Buddy Cannon; Kenny Chesney

Kenny Chesney singles chronology
"Better as a Memory" (2008)	"Everybody Wants to Go to Heaven" (2008)	"Down the Road" (2008)

Music video
- "Everybody Wants to Go to Heaven" on YouTube

"Everybody Wants to Go to Heaven" is a country music song co-written by American songwriters Jim Collins and Marty Dodson. The song was initially to have been recorded by George Strait for his 2008 album Troubadour, but after Strait decided not to include the song on this album, it was recorded by Kenny Chesney instead. Released in August 2008, Chesney's rendition is his thirty-eighth Top 40 country hit and his fifteenth Number One hit. Chesney's version is the first single from his album Lucky Old Sun, which was released on his own Blue Chair label in association with BNA Records.

== History ==
"Everybody Wants to Go to Heaven" was co-written by Marty Dodson and Jim Collins, the latter of whom has previously co-written two other singles for Chesney: "She Thinks My Tractor's Sexy" from late 1999-early 2000, and "The Good Stuff" from mid-2002. Initially, George Strait had recorded the song for his 2008 album Troubadour. Although Strait's version did not make the album's final cut, he nonetheless made his own rendition available as a digital download. Chesney then recorded his own version of the song, and released it as the first single from his studio album Lucky Old Sun, his first project for his personal Blue Chair label (in association with BNA Records, the label to which he has been signed since 1995).

Chesney's rendition of the song is a mid-tempo, set in a calypso orchestration with a slight reggae feel, and is backed by The Wailers, who also sing the final chorus on the album version.

== Content ==
The song is about a man detailing his life to a preacher who has told him to forgo a lifestyle of drinking alcohol and pursuing sexual desires, in favor of a more religious-oriented style. In the chorus, the narrator responds saying that "Everybody wants to go to heaven / But nobody wants to go now".

== Critical reception ==
Matt C. of Engine 145 gave the song a "thumbs down" rating. Although his review makes note of the song's "carefree sentiment that characterizes standards like 'Live Fast, Love Hard, Die Young'", he considered the calypso orchestration "patently offensive".

Alison Bonaguro, who contributes to the blog for the television network CMT, gave the song a more positive review. Although she referred to the instrumentation as "not-so-country", she described the song's sentiment favorably, comparing it to Tim McGraw's 2004 single "Live Like You Were Dying", but without a "preachy feel".

Kevin John Coyne of Country Universe gave it a B grade. He said that the only problem with the song was the production, and that "the calypso trimmings used to be a distinctive trademark of Kenny Chesney records, but by now, they’re a crutch."

== Music video ==
In August 2008, Chesney traveled to Jamaica to film the song's music video. The Wailers are featured in the video as well.

== Charts ==
"Everybody Wants to Go to Heaven" debuted at number 22 on the Billboard Hot Country Songs chart dated for the week of August 16, 2008. For the chart week of October 18, 2008, it has become his fifteenth Number One hit. The next week, its second and final week at Number One, the song was credited as "Kenny Chesney with The Wailers". Prior to this, it had been credited to Chesney alone.

Chart (2008)	Peak position
US Hot Country Songs (Billboard)	1
US Billboard Hot 100	41
Canada Country (Billboard)	1
Canada Hot 100 (Billboard)	49

=== Year-end charts ===
Chart (2008)	Position
US Country Songs (Billboard)	15

== Certifications ==
Region	Certification	Certified units/sales
United States (RIAA)	Gold	500,000^{‡}
^{‡} Sales+streaming figures based on certification alone.
