= Somewhere with You =

Single by Kenny Chesney

from the album Hemingway's Whiskey
- Released: November 8, 2010
- Recorded: 2010
- Genre: Country
- Length: 4:04 (album version); 3:41 (single edit)
- Label: BNA
- Songwriters: Shane McAnally; J. T. Harding
- Producers: Buddy Cannon; Kenny Chesney

Kenny Chesney singles chronology
"The Boys of Fall" (2010)	"Somewhere with You" (2010)	"Live a Little" (2011)

"Somewhere with You" is a song written by Shane McAnally and J. T. Harding and recorded by American country music singer Kenny Chesney. It was released in November 2010 as the second single from Chesney's 2010 album Hemingway's Whiskey. The song reached number one on the U.S. Billboard Hot Country Songs chart in January–February 2011, where it stayed for 3 weeks.

== Background and content ==
In an interview with Country Music Television, Chesney said, "It's so different but I still felt that it was really me. I felt melodically it was completely different and sexy". In an interview with Billboard, Chesney said, "This is a tortured soul song. If you get going with somebody, you've been in a relationship and for whatever reason she's gone or you're gone. And you're not necessarily in another relationship, but you're with somebody else, just starting something with somebody else. Trying to balance both those worlds is tough."

== Critical reception ==
Whitney Pastorek of Entertainment Weekly said that the song "has a compellingly dark vibe Chesney should try out more often." Jon Caramanica of The New York Times believed that the chorus "recalls nothing so much as the Bee Gees." Rick Moore of American Songwriter called the song one of the album's "high points".

== Chart performance ==
"Somewhere with You" debuted at number 35 on the U.S. Billboard Hot Country Songs chart dated for the week ending November 6, 2010. The song peaked at number one on the week ending January 29, 2011 and held that position for three weeks.

The song entered the Adult Contemporary charts at number 26 for the week of March 19, 2011.

As of June 2011, the song has sold over 1,000,000 copies in the United States.

The single was certified 3× platinum by the Recording Industry Association of America (RIAA) in November 2022.

=== Weekly charts ===
Chart (2010–2011)	Peak position
Canada Hot 100 (Billboard)	52
Canada Country (Billboard)	1
US Billboard Hot 100	31
US Adult Contemporary (Billboard)	15
US Hot Country Songs (Billboard)	1

=== Year-end charts ===
Chart (2011)	Position
US Adult Contemporary (Billboard)	39
US Country Songs (Billboard)	31

=== Decade-end charts ===
Chart (2010–2019)	Position
US Hot Country Songs (Billboard)	44

== Certifications ==
Region	Certification	Certified units/sales
United States (RIAA)	3× Platinum	3,000,000^{‡}
^{‡} Sales+streaming figures based on certification alone.
