= Beer in Mexico (song) =

- The song's lyrics

Single by Kenny Chesney

from the album The Road and the Radio
- Released: January 8, 2007
- Recorded: 2005
- Genre: Country
- Length: 4:33 (album version); 3:44 (radio version)
- Label: BNA
- Songwriter: Kenny Chesney
- Producers: Buddy Cannon; Kenny Chesney

Kenny Chesney singles chronology
"You Save Me" (2006)	"Beer in Mexico" (2007)	"Never Wanted Nothing More" (2007)

"Beer In Mexico" is a song written and recorded by American country music artist Kenny Chesney. It was released in January 2007 as the fifth and final single from his 2005 album The Road and the Radio. The song reached number one on the U.S. Billboard Hot Country Songs chart, and is the first single solely written by Chesney to top the chart.

== Background and writing ==
The liner notes for The Road and the Radio state that Chesney wrote the song while vacationing in Cabo San Lucas, Mexico for Sammy Hagar's birthday party.

== Content ==
This song talks about a guy who is at the "crossroads in [his] life" and doesn't know what decisions to make, so he decides to relax and have a “beer in Mexico.”

== Critical reception ==
Kevin John Coyne of Country Universe gave the song a B+ grade, saying that it "is a cool, loud record" and that "[t]here’s almost too much going on, but just almost" and concluding with "[how] radio will be all over the song". Dan Milliken of Country Universe rated the song number 108 on his list of the 201 Greatest Singles of the Decade. He stated that the song "was such a perfect encapsulation of Kenny Chesney’s musical identity from this decade that you could skip over most of the rest of his work and still get the basic idea."

== Chart positions ==
"Beer in Mexico" debuted at number 60 on the U.S. Billboard Hot Country Songs chart for the week of November 19, 2005 as an album cut. It re-entered Hot Country Songs at number 51 for the week of January 6, 2007.

Chart (2007)	Peak position
US Hot Country Songs (Billboard)	1
US Billboard Hot 100	61
Canada Country (Billboard)	1

=== Year-end charts ===
Chart (2007)	Position
US Country Songs (Billboard)	24

== Certifications ==
Certifications for Beer in Mexico
Region	Certification	Certified units/sales
United States (RIAA)	Platinum	1,000,000^{‡}
^{‡} Sales+streaming figures based on certification alone.

== Other version ==
Mexican singer Thalía recorded a Castilian version of the song for her 2014 studio album Amore Mío.
