= Girl of Your Dreams =

Girl Of Your Dreams

Studio album by Bobbie Cryner
- Released: 1996
- Genre: Country music
- Length: 34:49
- Label: MCA Nashville
- Producer: Barry Beckett, Tony Brown

Bobbie Cryner chronology
Bobbie Cryner (1993)	Girl Of Your Dreams (1996)

Professional ratings
Review scores
Source	Rating
Allmusic	link
Robert Christgau	A−

Girl Of Your Dreams is the second record from country music singer-songwriter Bobbie Cryner. It was her first album on MCA Records.

The ten tracks include three by Cryner alone, two co-written by her, and five others by other songwriters. Two of the tracks are covers: Dusty Springfield's "Son of a Preacher Man" and Dottie West's "A Lesson in Leaving."

The album featured another three singles. The first, "I Just Can't Stand to Be Unhappy", was written by Hugh Prestwood and peaked at number 63 in 1995. The second, "You'd Think He'd Know Me Better", charted as high as 56 in 1996. The last single from the disc, the autobiographical "I Didn't Know My Own Strength" was released in late summer of 1996.

== Track listing ==
1. "Son of a Preacher Man" (John Hurley, Ronnie Wilkins) — 2:47
2. "I Didn't Know My Own Strength" (Kent Blazy, Cryner, Sonny LeMaire) — 3:43
3. "The Girl of Your Dreams" (Cryner) — 4:06
4. "Vision of Loneliness" (Cryner) — 3:25
5. "A Lesson in Leaving" (Randy Goodrum, Brent Maher) — 2:47
6. "You'd Think He'd Know Me Better" (Cryner) — 4:06
7. "I Just Can't Stand to Be Unhappy" (Hugh Prestwood) — 3:38
8. "Nobody Leaves" (Cryner, David Stephenson) — 3:49
9. "Oh to Be the One" (Roger Murrah, Randy VanWarmer) — 2:48
10. "Just Say So" (Cathy Majeski, John Scott Sherrill) — 3:40

== Production ==
- Produced By Barry Beckett & Tony Brown
- Engineers: Csaba Petocz
- Assistant Engineers: David Hall, Amy Hughes, Daryl Roudbush
- Mixing: Csaba Petocz
- Mix Assistant: David Hall
- Mastering: Bob Ludwig

== Personnel ==
- Drums: Eddie Bayers
- Percussion: Terry McMillan
- Bass guitar: Michael Rhodes
- Keyboards: Steve Nathan, Bobby Ogdin
- Steel Guitar: Paul Franklin
- Acoustic Guitar: Don Potter
- Electric guitar: Brent Rowan
- Lead Vocals: Bobbie Cryner
- Background Vocals: John Wesley Ryles, Dennis Wilson, Curtis Young
