= The Lunabelles =

American country music group

- Origin: New York City, U.S.
- Genres: Country
- Years active: 2011–2012
- Labels: BNA
- Past members: Dominique Arciero; Gabby Arciero; Olivia Arciero; Alex Kline

The Lunabelles were an American country music group consisting of sisters Olivia Arciero (lead vocals, rhythm guitar), Dominique Arciero (vocals, piano, mandolin), Gabby Arciero (vocals, drums, percussion), and Alex Kline (lead guitar, Dobro, mandolin, banjo). Prior to the foundation of the band, the Arciero sisters recorded with their sister Jillian and toured with Kenny Rogers.

In April 2011, the group released its debut single "A Place to Shine" through BNA Records. Billy Dukes of Taste of Country rated the single 7 out of 10, praising the instrumentation and personality. The song entered the country charts at number 58 for the chart dated June 18, 2011, and peaked at number 52. The Lunabelles were dropped by their record label in May 2012, leaving their debut album unreleased.

== Singles ==
Year	Single	Peak positions
Year	Single	US Country
2011	"A Place to Shine"	52
