= Bobbie Cryner =

American country singer-songwriter

- Born: Phyllis Cryner; September 13, 1961 (age 64)
- Origin: Woodland, California, United States
- Genres: Country
- Occupation: Singer-songwriter
- Instruments: Vocals, Piano
- Years active: 1993–present
- Labels: Epic; MCA; Do It Up Big Music

Phyllis "Bobbie" Cryner (born September 13, 1961) is an American country singer-songwriter. She released her debut album, the bluesy Bobbie Cryner, in 1993 on Epic Records. The album featured six original Cryner songs, as well as four songs by outside writers, including a duet with Dwight Yoakam on the Buck Owens cover "I Don't Care." The album charted three singles on the Billboard Hot Country Singles & Tracks chart, including "Daddy Laid the Blues On Me," No. 63 on July 31, 1993; "He Feels Guilty," No. 68 on December 11, 1993; and "You Could Steal Me," No. 72 on May 28, 1994.

Cryner left Epic Records for MCA Records to record her second album, Girl of Your Dreams. The album was produced by Tony Brown, head of MCA Records. The second album featured a more straight-ahead, contemporary country. As with the first, Cryner wrote five of the songs on the album, with the other five coming from outside songwriters, including her cover of "Son of a Preacher Man". The album was heralded by the first single and video, "I Just Can't Stand To Be Unhappy," which was written by noted songwriter Hugh Prestwood and entered the country charts on October 14, 1995. It peaked at No. 63 on the Hot Country Singles & Tracks. The second single and video, "You'd Think He'd Know Me Better," entered the charts on March 2, 1996, and peaked at No. 56. A third single and video, Cryner's autobiographical "I Didn't Know My Own Strength," was released in late summer 1996. Cryner left MCA in 1997.

Cryner continued writing songs for other artists, including Trisha Yearwood's "Real Live Woman" (#16), Suzy Bogguss' "Nobody Love, Nobody Gets Hurt" (#63), and Lee Ann Womack's "Stronger Than I Am."

Bobbie Cryner appeared briefly in the 1995 film Something to Talk About starring Julia Roberts, Dennis Quaid, and Robert Duvall.

== Discography ==
=== Albums ===
Title	Album details
Bobbie Cryner	Release date: August 24, 1993; Label: Epic Records
Girl of Your Dreams	Release date: January 2, 1996; Label: MCA Nashville

=== Singles ===
Year	Single	Peak chart positions		Album
Year	Single	US Country	CAN Country	Album
1993	"Daddy Laid the Blues on Me"	63	72	Bobbie Cryner
1993	"He Feels Guilty"	68	48	Bobbie Cryner
1994	"You Could Steal Me"	72	—	Bobbie Cryner
1995	"I Just Can't Stand to Be Unhappy"	63	55	Girl of Your Dreams
1996	"You'd Think He'd Know Me Better"	56	—	Girl of Your Dreams
1996	"I Didn't Know My Own Strength"	—	90	Girl of Your Dreams
"—" denotes releases that did not chart

=== Music videos ===
Year	Video	Director
1993	"Daddy Laid the Blues on Me"	Michael Salomon
1993	"He Feels Guilty"	
1995	"I Just Can't Stand to Be Unhappy"	John Lloyd Miller
1996	"You'd Think He'd Know Me Better"	John Lloyd Miller
1996	"I Didn't Know My Own Strength"	John Lloyd Miller
