= Sarah Johns =

American country music artist

- Born: 1979 (age 45–46)
- Origin: Pollard, Kentucky, U.S.
- Genres: Country
- Occupation: Singer-songwriter
- Instrument: Vocals
- Years active: 2006–2008
- Labels: Show Dog, BNA

Sarah Johns (born 1979) is an American country music artist. Signed to BNA Records in 2006, she released her debut album Big Love in a Small Town, which accounted for two charting singles on the Billboard Hot Country Songs charts, including the No. 39 "The One in the Middle".

== Musical career ==
Sarah Johns was born in Pollard, Kentucky. She began singing regularly while attending the University of Kentucky.

In early 2006, Sarah Johns signed to Show Dog Nashville (now Show Dog-Universal Music), a record label owned by Toby Keith. Although she toured with Keith on his Big Throwdown 2 tour, she did not release anything on Show Dog, and left the label that April. A year later, Johns signed with BNA Records. She released her debut single "The One in the Middle" on April 30, 2007, and made Top 40 on the Billboard Hot Country Songs charts with it. On June 2, 2007, Johns made her debut on the Grand Ole Opry. Johns' debut album, Big Love in a Small Town, was released on August 28, 2007, and peaked at No. 198 on the Billboard 200. Allmusic critic Thom Jurek rated the album three stars out of five, comparing Johns' song choices and attitudes to those of Tammy Wynette and Gretchen Wilson and saying, "This record isn't all the way there, but it's well on the way and might blow up the charts anyway. Big Love in a Small Town is an auspicious debut by a young talent." Its second single, "He Hates Me", peaked at No. 47 on the country charts.

== Discography ==
=== Big Love in a Small Town (2007) ===
Big Love in a Small Town

Studio album by Sarah Johns
- Released: August 28, 2007
- Genre: Country
- Length: 37:33
- Label: BNA
- Producer: Joe Scaife

==== Track listing ====
No.	Title	Writer(s)	Length
1.	"When Do I Get to Be a Woman"	Sarah Johns, Jason Sellers, Lynn Hutton	3:01
2.	"If You Could Hold Your Woman (Like You Hold Your Whiskey)"	Johns, Jim Collins, Tony Martin	3:32
3.	"A Lot to Let Go Of"	Johns, Sellers, Dale Dodson	3:11
4.	"Baby My Heart"	Johns, Sellers, Michael Dulaney	4:02
5.	"Big Love in a Small Town"	Johns, Martin, Mark Nesler	3:06
6.	"Touch Me"	Johns, Hutton, Jon Henderson	3:38
7.	"The One in the Middle"	Johns, Sellers, Hutton	3:55
8.	"That's Just Me Getting Over You"	Johns, Dodson, Billy Lawson	4:04
9.	"He Hates Me"	Johns, Sellers, Tim Nichols	2:59
10.	"Muddy Water"	Johns, Sellers, Nichols	3:02
11.	"It's Hard to Be a Girl (In a Young Man's World)"	Johns, Dodson, Dean Dillon	3:07

==== Album chart positions ====
Chart (2007)	Peak position
US Heatseekers Albums (Billboard)	3
US Billboard 200	198
US Top Country Albums (Billboard)	31

=== Singles ===
Year	Single	Peak positions	Album
Year	Single	US Country	Album
2007	"The One in the Middle"	39	Big Love in a Small Town
2008	"He Hates Me"	47	Big Love in a Small Town
