= Ray Vega =

American singer-songwriter

- Born: Ray Justin Vega; July 28, 1961 (age 64)
- Origin: Los Angeles, California, United States
- Genres: Country
- Occupation: Singer-songwriter
- Instrument: Vocals
- Years active: 1986–present
- Labels: BNA; Ariola
- Formerly of: The Vega Brothers

Ray Vega (born July 28, 1961) is an American country and adult contemporary artist.

In the 1980s, Vega performed with his brother, Robert, as The Vega Brothers. The duo were signed by MCA Records and their single "Heartache the Size of Texas" peaked at No. 54 on the Billboard Hot Country Singles chart in 1986. Their music was produced by Jimmy Bowen. After the duo broke up, Vega worked various odd jobs in Nashville.

Vega was signed to BNA Records as a solo artist in 1996. His debut single, "Remember When," peaked at No. 56 on the Hot Country Singles & Tracks chart. The song was produced by Josh Leo. After the disappointing response to the single, release of Vega's debut album, also titled Remember When, was cancelled; promotional copies, however, did enter into the marketplace. Another single, "Even More," failed to chart in the United States, although it reached No. 57 on the RPM Adult Contemporary chart in Canada.

Vega later recorded a pop album, 1999's Geography, that was released in Germany via BMG. Additionally, country artist Dusty Drake recorded a composition of Vega's, entitled "And Then," and released it as his debut single in 2002.

== Discography ==
=== Albums ===
Title	Album details
Remember When	Release date: October 8, 1996; Label: BNA Records
Geography	Release date: May 31, 1999; Label: Ariola Records

=== Singles ===
Year	Single	Peak chart positions			Album
Year	Single	US Country	CAN Country	CAN AC	Album
1996	"Remember When"	56	94	—	Remember When
1997	"I Can Dream"	—	—	—	Remember When
1997	"Even More"	—	—	57	Remember When
"—" denotes releases that did not chart

=== Music videos ===
Year	Video	Director
1996	"Remember When"	Steven Goldmann
