= B. B. Watson =

American singer-songwriter

B.B. Watson
- Born: Haskell Burl Watson; July 10, 1953
- Origin: Tyler, Texas, U.S.
- Died: September 28, 2013 (aged 60) Pasadena, Texas, U.S.
- Genres: Country
- Occupation: Singer-songwriter
- Instrument: Vocals
- Years active: 1991–2013
- Labels: BNA, Oarfin

Haskell Burl "B. B." Watson (July 10, 1953 – September 28, 2013) was an American country music artist. He charted in 1991 with the single "Light at the End of the Tunnel" from his album of the same name.

== Biography ==
Haskell Burl Watson was born July 10, 1953, in Tyler, Texas, and raised in La Porte, Texas. His nickname "B. B." stood for "Bad Boy". Watson spent his teenage and young adult years working as a musician throughout Texas before moving to Nashville, Tennessee, in 1991 to begin a music career. That same year, he was the first act signed to BNA Records, then a new label division of RCA Records Nashville. His debut single "Light at the End of the Tunnel" was the label's first charted single, entering Billboard Hot Country Songs in mid-1991. The song peaked at number 23 that year. Another single, "Lover Not a Fighter", peaked at number 43. Both songs were included on his only BNA album, also titled Light at the End of the Tunnel. Nick Cristiano of The Philadelphia Inquirer rated the album three out of four stars, comparing Watson's style favorably to Merle Haggard. Michael McCall of Country Music magazine praised the album's honky-tonk sound and Watson's "big voice".

His only other release was 2001's Delta Dream, which charted the single "The Memory Is the Last Thing to Go" that year. Watson died in Baytown, Texas, on September 28, 2013.

== Discography ==
=== Albums ===
| Title | Album details |
|---|---|
| Light at the End of the Tunnel | Release date: September 24, 1991; Label: BNA Records |
| Delta Dream | Release date: June 12, 2001; Label: Oarfin Records |

=== Singles ===
| Year | Single | Peak chart positions | | Album |
| Year | Single | US Country | CAN Country | Album |
|---|---|---|---|---|
| 1991 | "Light at the End of the Tunnel" | 23 | 49 | Light at the End of the Tunnel |
| 1991 | "Eye for an Eye" | — | — | Light at the End of the Tunnel |
| 1992 | "Lover Not a Fighter" | 43 | 56 | Light at the End of the Tunnel |
| 1992 | "Say Goodbye" | — | — | Light at the End of the Tunnel |
| 2000 | "The Memory Is the Last Thing to Go" | 73 | — | Delta Dream |
"—" denotes releases that did not chart
