= No Shoes, No Shirt, No Problems (song) =

Single by Kenny Chesney

from the album No Shoes, No Shirt, No Problems
- Released: May 26, 2003
- Recorded: 2002
- Genre: Country
- Length: 3:29 (album version); 2:55 (single version)
- Label: BNA 8287651854
- Songwriter: Casey Beathard
- Producers: Buddy Cannon; Kenny Chesney; Norro Wilson

Kenny Chesney singles chronology
"Big Star" (2003)	"No Shoes, No Shirt, No Problems" (2003)	"There Goes My Life" (2003)

"No Shoes, No Shirt, No Problems" is a song written by Casey Beathard and recorded by American country music singer Kenny Chesney. It was released in May 2003 as the fifth and final single from his album of the same name. The song peaked at number 2 on the Billboard Hot Country Singles & Tracks chart in August 2003, behind "It's Five O'Clock Somewhere" by Alan Jackson and Jimmy Buffett.

== Content ==
The protagonist is being run ragged by his job and fantasizes about going to a tropical place where there's "No boss, no clock, no stress, and no dress code".

== Music video ==
The music video was directed by Shaun Silva, and premiered on CMT on May 30, 2003, during CMT's "Smash Hits of Country".

== Chart positions ==
"No Shoes, No Shirt, No Problems" debuted at number 57 on the U.S. Billboard Hot Country Songs chart for the week of May 24, 2003.

Chart (2003)	Peak position
US Hot Country Songs (Billboard)	2
US Billboard Hot 100	28

=== Year-end charts ===
Chart (2003)	Position
US Country Songs (Billboard)	11
US Billboard Hot 100	91

== Certifications ==
Region	Certification	Certified units/sales
United States (RIAA)	2× Platinum	2,000,000^{‡}
^{‡} Sales+streaming figures based on certification alone.
