= Three Days (1999 film) =

1999 film

Three Days is a rock documentary about the 1997 Jane's Addiction Relapse Tour. It was written and directed by Kevin Ford and Carter B. Smith and debuted at the 1999 Slamdance International Film Festival and made rounds at small theaters in major cities in the United States. This DVD version took four years to come out.

The movie's popularity among fans made bootlegs a highly desired item. The film on this DVD is slightly different from the version that premiered in 1999, although that version can still be found among traders.

This DVD includes 40 minutes of extra footage from several stops on the tour as bonus features. The extras include footage of rehearsals, songs played in the dressing room, as well as interviews with fans and Jane's Addiction themselves.

The film won the Best Music Documentary award at the New York International Independent Film & Video Festival in 1999 and was nominated for the Grand Jury Prize at the 1999 Slamdance International Film Festival.

The film features a wide array of celebrities (most of them appearing only briefly) including Flea (Jane's Addiction's bassist for the tour), Anthony Kiedis and John Frusciante of Red Hot Chili Peppers, Marilyn Manson, Alyssa Milano, Christina Applegate and Val Kilmer (as well as others).
