= Jesse Hunter =

American singer-songwriter (born 1959)

- Born: Billy Ray Dungy II; January 14, 1959 (age 67); Shelby County, Tennessee, U.S.
- Genres: Country
- Occupation: Singer
- Instrument: Vocals
- Years active: 1994-present
- Label: BNA

Billy Ray Dungy II (born January 14, 1959), known professionally as Jesse Hunter, is an American country music artist.

Hunter signed to BNA Records in 1994, the same year that he released his Barry Beckett-produced debut album A Man Like Me. The album produced three chart singles in "Born Ready," "The Way She's Lookin'" and "Long Legged Hannah (From Butte, Montana)," his highest-charting single at No. 42 on the Billboard Hot Country Songs charts. "Born Ready" and "Long Legged Hannah" also charted on the RPM country charts in Canada. Michael Hight of New Country magazine gave Hunter's debut album a three-and-a-half star rating out of five, comparing his voice to Johnny Cash's and saying "the renegade nature[…]positions him as a folk hero who has lived and learned and is ready to talk about it."

Dungy has not recorded professionally since. As of 2021, he resides in Watertown, Tennessee, and has written local theatre productions.

== Discography ==
=== Studio albums ===
| Title | Album details |
|---|---|
| A Man Like Me | Release date: April 26, 1994; Label: BNA Records; Formats: CD, cassette |

=== Singles ===
| Year | Single | Peak chart positions | | Album |
| Year | Single | US Country | CAN Country | Album |
|---|---|---|---|---|
| 1994 | "Born Ready" | 56 | 77 | A Man Like Me |
| 1994 | "By the Way She's Lookin'" | 65 | — | A Man Like Me |
| 1994 | "Long Legged Hannah (From Butte, Montana)" | 42 | 56 | A Man Like Me |
"—" denotes releases that did not chart

=== Music videos ===
| Year | Video | Director |
|---|---|---|
| 1994 | "Born Ready" | Jon Small |
| 1994 | "By the Way She's Lookin'" | Dick Buckley |
| 1994 | "Long Legged Hannah (From Butte, Montana)" | Steven Goldmann |
