= Shaun Silva =

American music video director

- Occupation: Music video director
- Years active: 1999–present

Shaun Silva is an American music video director who works primarily in the country music field. He has directed a number of music videos for many country music artists, including many of Kenny Chesney's music videos. His other clients include Jason Aldean, Danielle Bradbery, Luke Bryan, Blake Shelton, Old Dominion, Sugarland, Brooks & Dunn, Florida Georgia Line, Rascal Flatts, Carrie Underwood, and Sonya Isaacs. In addition, Silva has also directed a few videos for acts from outside music genres, such as Uncle Kracker, Kaleo, Limp Bizkit, and 3 Doors Down.

In 2008, Silva received four nominations in the Country Music Television (CMT) awards. In 2010, he won the award for Best Director.

Silva is married to country music singer Shannon Brown. They have two sons.
