= BNA Records =

American record label

- Parent company: Sony Music Entertainment
- Founded: April 1991; 35 years ago
- Founder: Boomer Castleman
- Defunct: 2012
- Status: Defunct (absorbed into Columbia Nashville)
- Distributor: Sony Music Nashville (US)
- Genre: Country
- Country of origin: United States
- Location: Nashville, Tennessee

BNA Records, formerly known as BNA Entertainment, was a label group that shared ties with Arista Nashville and RCA Nashville from parent company Sony Music Nashville, which itself is a subsidiary of Sony Music Entertainment. Based in Nashville, Tennessee, BNA featured country music acts on its roster. The company derived its name from the IATA and ICAO airport codes for Nashville International Airport.

The label was founded by Boomer Castleman, who sold it to BMG Music in 1993. The first act signed was B. B. Watson.

In August 2011, Sony Nashville announced a major corporate restructuring which included the merger of Columbia Nashville into BNA. The BNA name was retired in June 2012, with the last remaining artists moving to a newly re-established Columbia Nashville.

== Former artists ==
- Rhett Akins
- John Anderson
- Marc Beeson
- Wade Bowen
- Shannon Brown
- Tracy Byrd
- Kenny Chesney
- Terri Clark
- Kellie Coffey
- Dale Daniel
- Jennifer Day
- Bill Engvall
- Tyler Farr
- Pat Green
- Merle Haggard
- Kim Hill
- Jesse Hunter
- Casey James
- Keith Whitley
- Chris Janson
- Sarah Johns
- Jamey Johnson
- George Jones (Bandit/BNA)
- The Kentucky Headhunters
- Blaine Larsen (Giantslayer/BNA)
- Jim Lauderdale
- Aaron Lines
- Lonestar
- The Lost Trailers
- The Lunabelles
- Mindy McCready
- Craig Morgan
- Lorrie Morgan
- K. T. Oslin
- Kellie Pickler
- Pinmonkey
- Rachel Proctor
- The Remingtons
- John Rich
- Tim Ryan
- Jason Sellers
- Lisa Stewart
- Doug Supernaw
- Tebey
- Turner Nichols
- Ray Vega
- The Warren Brothers
- B. B. Watson
- The Wilkinsons

== See also ==
- Arista Nashville
- Columbia Records Nashville
- RCA Records Nashville
