= Wherever You Are =

Wherever You Are may refer to:

== Film ==
- Wherever You Are (film), a 2008 film by Robert Margolies
- Wherever You Are (1988 film), a Polish film by Krzysztof Zanussi

== Albums ==
- Wherever You Are (David Mead album), or the title song, 2005
- Wherever You Are (Sami Yusuf album), or the title song, 2010
- Wherever You Are (Third Day album), 2005
- Live: Wherever You Are, an album by Jack Ingram, or the title song (see below), 2006
- Wherever You Are, an EP by Eric Dill, 2012

== Songs ==
- "Wherever You Are" (Jack Ingram song)
- "Wherever You Are" (Kodaline song)
- "Wherever You Are" (Mic Geronimo song)
- "Wherever You Are" (Military Wives song)
- "Where Ever U Are", a song by Cedric Gervais featuring Jessica Sutta
- "Wherever You Are", a song by 5 Seconds of Summer from their 2012 EP Somewhere New
- "Wherever You Are", a remix of "Donde Quiera Que Estés" by Selena and Barrio Boyzz
- "Wherever You Are", a song by The Doubleclicks from their 2012 EP Christmas Ain't About Me
- "Wherever You Are", a song by Neil Finn from One Nil
- "Wherever You Are", a song from the film Pooh's Grand Adventure: The Search for Christopher Robin
- "Wherever You Are", a song by Kesha from the 2012 album Warrior
- "Wherever You Are", a song by Mary Chapin Carpenter from Party Doll and Other Favorites
- "Wherever You Are (I Feel Love)", a song by Laava (Fernanda Brandão)
- "Wherever You Are", a song by 5 Seconds of Summer released as a bonus track on some versions of their eponymous debut album
- "Wherever you are", a song by One Ok Rock from their 2010 album Niche Syndrome
- "Wherever You Are", a song by P1X3L
- "Wherever You Are", a song by S Club Juniors from the 2002 album Together
