= Good Times (Charlie Robison album) =

Studio album by Charlie Robison
- Released: September 21, 2004
- Studio: Bismeaux Studios and Boar's Nest Studio, Austin, TX
- Genre: Country
- Length: 47:40
- Label: Dualtone Records
- Producer: Lloyd Maines; Charlie Robison

Charlie Robison chronology
Live (2003)	Good Times (2004)	Beautiful Day (2009)

Good Times is the fifth solo studio album by Charlie Robison, released on September 21, 2004. It is his seventh album, overall, including a live album, appropriately titled Live, as well as a collaborate effort with Jack Ingram and Charlie's brother, Bruce Robison, titled Unleashed Live. Good Times peaked at No. 52 on the Billboard Top Country Albums chart.

== Critical reception ==
Professional ratings
Review scores
Source	Rating
AllMusic	3.5/5 stars
PopMatters	7/10 stars
The Austin Chronicle	4/5

Ronnie D. Lankford, Jr. of AllMusic says, "Robison isn't a mainstream country singer, but seems like he's playing country music because it's part of who he is and how he thinks, not because a friend loaned him a George Jones album in college."

Hank Kalet of PopMatters rates this album a 7 and writes, "Throughout, there is an ominous shadow cast that makes the good times seem a desperate attempt to keep away the blues. There is sadness and there are good times and they mingle, inform each other, change each other."

Christopher Gray of The Austin Chronicle gives the album 4 stars and says, "Good Times is darker and mellower than 2001's Life of the Party, but only because there's no song told by a brawling Irishman."

== Track listing ==
All tracks are written by Charlie Robison, unless otherwise noted.

No.	Title	Writer(s)	Length
1.	"Good Times"		3:53
2.	"New Year's Day"		3:51
3.	"El Cerrito Place"	Keith Gattis	5:38
4.	"Big City Blues"	Keith Gattis	3:48
5.	"The Bottom"	Waylon Payne	5:03
6.	"Love Means Never Having To Say You're Hungry"		3:48
7.	"Photograph"		3:46
8.	"Something in The Water"		3:51
9.	"Always"		5:08
10.	"Flatland Boogie"	Terry Allen	4:18
11.	"Magnolia"		4:36
Total length:			47:40

== Musicians ==
- Charlie Robison – acoustic guitars, vocals, harmony vocals
- Keith Robinson – drums, percussion
- Scott Esbeck – bass guitar
- Riley Osbourn – keyboards
- David Grissom – guitars
- Eamon McLoughlin – fiddle
- Glenn Fukunaga – doghouse bass
- Chip Dolan – accordion
- Rich Brotherton – mandolin
- Ted Roddy – harmonica
- Lloyd Maines – steel guitar, dobro, papoose, lap steel guitar
- Natalie Maines – backing vocals

== Production ==
- Producer – Charlie Robison
- Producer – Lloyd Maines
- Engineer – Billy C. "Cris" Burns
- Additional engineering – James Calloway

Track information and credits adapted the album's liner notes.

== Charts ==
Chart (2004)	Peak position
US Top Country Albums (Billboard)	52
