= This Is It (Jack Ingram album) =

Studio album by Jack Ingram
- Released: March 27, 2007
- Genre: Country
- Length: 44:16
- Label: Big Machine
- Producer: Jack Ingram; Doug Lancio; Jeremy Stover

Jack Ingram chronology
Live: Wherever You Are (2006)	This Is It (2007)	Big Dreams & High Hopes (2009)

Singles from This Is It
- 1. "Lips of an Angel" Released: December 11, 2006; 2. "Measure of a Man" Released: April 23, 2007; 3. "Maybe She'll Get Lonely" Released: October 29, 2007

Professional ratings
Review scores
Source	Rating
Allmusic	3/5 stars
Entertainment Weekly	B

This Is It is the seventh studio album by American country music artist Jack Ingram, released in 2007. It is his second album for Big Machine Records. It features a cover of Hinder's hit single "Lips of an Angel", which Ingram released as a single, reaching No. 16 on the Billboard Hot Country Songs charts with it. "Measure of a Man" and "Maybe She'll Get Lonely", the second and third singles, respectively reached No. 18 and No. 24 on the same chart. Also featured are the singles "Wherever You Are" and "Love You", both of which were the only studio tracks on the otherwise live compilation Live: Wherever You Are, which Ingram released in 2006. This Is It also features the music videos for those two songs.

== Track listing ==
No.	Title	Writer(s)	Length
1.	"Measure of a Man"	Radney Foster, Gordie Sampson	3:17
2.	"Hold On" (duet with Sheryl Crow)	Blu Sanders	4:03
3.	"Lips of an Angel"	Brian Howes, Lloyd Garvey, Ross Hanson, Michael Rodden, Mark King, Austin Winkler	3:50
4.	"Wherever You Are"	Steve Bogard, Jeremy Stover	3:37
5.	"Love You"	Jay Knowles, Trent Summar	2:43
6.	"Easy as 1, 2, 3, (Part II)"	Todd Snider, Jack Ingram	2:43
7.	"Ava Adele"	Ingram	2:50
8.	"Make a Wish (Coming Home Again)"	Ingram	4:32
9.	"Great Divide"	Ingram	4:13
10.	"Don't Want to Hurt"	Ingram, Chris Masterson	3:51
11.	"Maybe She'll Get Lonely"	John Kennedy, Jamie Paulin, Stover	3:24
12.	"All I Can Do"	Ingram, Tom Littlefield	4:12

== Production ==
As listed in liner notes.

- Jeremy Stover – tracks 1–5, 7, 11
- Doug Lancio – tracks 6, 12
- Jack Ingram and Jeremy Stover – track 10
- Doug Lancio and Jeremy Stover – tracks 8, 9

== Chart performance ==
=== Album ===
Chart (2007)	Peak position
U.S. Billboard Top Country Albums	4
U.S. Billboard 200	34

=== Singles ===
Year	Single	Peak chart positions		
Year	Single	US Country	US	US Pop
2006	"Lips of an Angel"	16	77	87
2007	"Measure of a Man"	18	108	—
2007	"Maybe She'll Get Lonely"	24	—	—
"—" denotes releases that did not chart
