= Big Dreams & High Hopes =

Studio album by Jack Ingram
- Released: August 25, 2009
- Genre: Country
- Length: 42:36
- Label: Big Machine
- Producer: Radney Foster; Jay Joyce; Doug Lancio; Jeremy Stover

Jack Ingram chronology
| This Is It (2007) | Big Dreams & High Hopes (2009) | Midnight Motel (2016) |

Singles from Big Dreams & High Hopes
- 1. "That's a Man" Released: October 13, 2008; 2. "Barefoot and Crazy" Released: March 30, 2009; 3. "Seeing Stars" Released: October 12, 2009; 4. "Free" Released: January 25, 2010; 5. "Barbie Doll" Released: May 2010

Professional ratings
Review scores
| Source | Rating |
|---|---|
| Allmusic | 3.5/5 stars |
| Roughstock | (favorable) |
| Slant Magazine | 3.5/5 stars |

Big Dreams & High Hopes is the eighth studio album by American country music singer Jack Ingram. It was released on August 25, 2009 via Big Machine Records as his third release for the label. The album includes the singles "That's a Man" (a Top 20 hit) and "Barefoot and Crazy," which is Ingram's first Top 10 hit on the U.S. Billboard Hot Country Songs charts since 2005's "Wherever You Are".

== Content ==
Regarding the album's content, Ingram told CMT that the album will have "more guts" than his previous albums. It was originally to have included Ellis Paul's "The World Ain't Slowing Down," which was cut from the album.

"That's a Man" served as the lead-off single, reaching No. 18 on the U.S. country charts in mid-2009. The album was originally to have been released at that point, but the release was moved as "That's a Man" fell from the charts weeks before the album's first release date. "Barefoot and Crazy" was then issued as the second single, "Seeing Stars" the third and "Free" the fourth.

Also included on this album is a re-recording of "Barbie Doll," which Ingram previously recorded on his 1999 studio album Hey You. The version here features guest vocals from Dierks Bentley, Randy Houser, James Otto and members of Little Big Town and The Lost Trailers. A radio edit of the same song, featuring only Ingram and Bentley, was issued as the fifth single.

== Reception ==
Allmusic reviewer Thom Jurek gave the album three-and-a-half stars out of five. He considered the production reminiscent of 1970s rock music, and said that most of the songs were well written but not distinctive.

The album debuted on Billboard 200 at No. 61, No. 21 on the Top Country Albums chart, selling 10,000 copies in its first week. It has sold 34,000 copies in the US as of May 2016.

== Track listing ==
| No. | Title | Writer(s) | Length |
|---|---|---|---|
| 1. | "Free" | Jay Knowles, Trent Summar | 3:06 |
| 2. | "Barefoot and Crazy" | Ben Hayslip, Rhett Akins, Dallas Davidson | 3:30 |
| 3. | "That's a Man" | Ed Hill, Steven Dale Jones, Mark D. Sanders | 3:57 |
| 4. | "Seeing Stars" (duet with Patty Griffin) | Jack Ingram, Chris Tompkins | 3:54 |
| 5. | "Not Giving Up on Me" | Ingram, Jeffrey Steele, Tom Hambridge | 4:01 |
| 6. | "Barbie Doll" (featuring Dierks Bentley, Randy Houser, Little Big Town, The Lost Trailers and James Otto) | Ingram, Todd Snider | 3:56 |
| 7. | "Big Dreams & High Hopes" | Ingram, Gary Burr | 3:52 |
| 8. | "Heartache" | Ingram, Radney Foster, Darrell Brown | 4:27 |
| 9. | "Man in Your Life" | Ingram, Foster | 3:35 |
| 10. | "King of Wasted Time" | Tom Shapiro, Jim Collins, Tony Martin | 3:39 |
| 11. | "In the Corner" | Ingram | 4:54 |

== Personnel ==
- Dierks Bentley – duet vocals on "Barbie Doll"
- Eric Borash – electric guitar
- Steve Brewster – drums, percussion
- Todd Cooper – background vocals
- Chad Cromwell – drums
- Dan Dugmore – steel guitar
- Shawn Fichter – drums
- Ian Fitchuk – keyboards
- Larry Franklin – fiddle
- Patty Griffin – duet vocals on "Seeing Stars"
- Lee Hendricks – bass guitar
- Byron House – bass guitar
- Jedd Hughes – acoustic guitar, electric guitar, mandolin, background vocals
- Jack Ingram – acoustic guitar, lead vocals
- Mike Johnson – steel guitar
- Jay Joyce – acoustic guitar, electric guitar, keyboards, organ, piano
- Doug Kahan – bass guitar
- Craig Krampf – percussion
- Troy Lancaster – electric guitar
- Doug Lancio – drums, acoustic guitar, electric guitar, keyboards, programming
- The Little Big Lost Beat Up Ford Funky Times Freedom Choir – background vocals on "Barbie Doll"
- Georgia Middleman – background vocals
- Mike Rojas – keyboards, organ
- Matthew Ryan – bass guitar
- Steve Sheehan – acoustic guitar
- Adam Shoenfeld – electric guitar
- Russell Terrell – background vocals
- Chris Tompkins – keyboards

== Chart performance ==
=== Album ===
| Chart (2009) | Peak position |
|---|---|
| US Billboard 200 | 61 |
| US Top Country Albums (Billboard) | 21 |

=== Singles ===
| Year | Single | Peak chart positions | |
| Year | Single | US Country | US |
|---|---|---|---|
| 2008 | "That's a Man" | 18 | 104 |
| 2009 | "Barefoot and Crazy" | 10 | 64 |
| 2009 | "Seeing Stars" (with Patty Griffin) | 54 | — |
| 2010 | "Free" | 42 | — |
| 2010 | "Barbie Doll" (with Dierks Bentley) | 56 | — |
"—" denotes releases that did not chart
