= Welcome to the Fishbowl =

Studio album by Kenny Chesney
- Released: June 19, 2012
- Recorded: 2012
- Venue: Red Rocks Amphitheatre (Morrison, Colorado)
- Studios: Ben's Place (Nashville, Tennessee); Blackbird (Nashville, Tennessee); Emerald Sound (Nashville, Tennessee); Love Shack (Nashville, Tennessee); Ocean Way (Nashville, Tennessee); Sound Emporium (Nashville, Tennessee); Sound Stage (Nashville, Tennessee); Tone Dock (Nashville, Tennessee); Westwood (Nashville, Tennessee)
- Genre: Country
- Length: 53:03
- Labels: Blue Chair; Columbia Nashville
- Producers: Buddy Cannon; Kenny Chesney

Kenny Chesney chronology
Hemingway's Whiskey (2010)	Welcome to the Fishbowl (2012)	Life on a Rock (2013)

Singles from Welcome to the Fishbowl
- 1. "Feel Like a Rock Star" Released: April 2, 2012; 2. "Come Over" Released: May 14, 2012; 3. "El Cerrito Place" Released: September 10, 2012

Welcome to the Fishbowl is the fourteenth studio album by American country music singer Kenny Chesney. It was released on June 19, 2012 as his first album for Blue Chair and Columbia Records. The album includes a live version of "You and Tequila" with Grace Potter.

The first single from this album, "Feel Like a Rock Star", a duet with Tim McGraw, was released in April 2012. Its second single, "Come Over", was released on May 14, 2012. This song reached number one on the Hot Country Songs chart. "El Cerrito Place", the album's third single, was originally recorded by Charlie Robison on his 2004 album Good Times. Chesney's version includes a backing vocal from Grace Potter.

== Background ==
The album's title came from a conversation Chesney had with his football-playing friends. Chesney told USA Today that when one said, "I didn't realize your life was like this," he replied, "Hey, man, welcome to the fishbowl."

== Critical reception ==
Professional ratings
Aggregate scores
Source	Rating
Metacritic	(64/100)
Review scores
Source	Rating
About.com	3/5 stars
AbsolutePunk	80%
AllMusic	3/5 stars
American Songwriter	4/5 stars
Entertainment Weekly	B−
Omaha World-Herald	2/4 stars
Rolling Stone	3/5 stars
Roughstock	4/5 stars
Taste of Country	4/5 stars
USA Today	2.5/4 stars

Upon its release, Welcome to the Fishbowl received generally positive reviews from most music critics. At Metacritic, which assigns a weighted average score out of 100 to reviews and ratings from mainstream critics, the album received a metascore of 64, based on 7 reviews.

The album has garnered positive reviews from AbsolutePunk, American Songwriter, The Boston Globe, Entertainment Weekly, Roughstock, Taste of Country, and the USA Today. At AbsolutePunk, Gregory Robson gave the album an 80%, and wrote that "Kenny Chesney's fourteenth studio album is nowhere near his best and nowhere near his worst. What it is though is occasionally pleasing, horribly derivative and way too self-indulgent." Robson went on to state that "Welcome to the Fishbowl is anything but first-rate. More albums like this though, and Chesney himself just might become a caricature of himself." Grady Smith at Entertainment Weekly graded the album to be a B− effort, and added that "Chesney's albums have always been considerably more wistful than his radio persona, but Welcome to the Fishbowl's tunes, while well wrought, can be downright dour. The tonal shift is fine — the problem is that these weepies often come off less like authentic autobiography than downbeat Nashville role-playing. (The too-sleek production and ponderous, stretched-out tempos don't help.)" In addition, Smith wrote that "Fishbowl reveals less about the star's true interior life than ever."

The album received four-out-of-five stars from American Songwriter, Roughstock and Taste of Country. American Songwriter music critic Eric Allen noted that "Fishbowl displays a serious yearning to stretch and dig a little deeper into life’s foibles, as if Chesney is trying to figure them out himself, but in a good way." Furthermore, Allen evoked how "Welcome to the Fishbowl still manages to sound highly personal and introspective. Chesney has an uncanny knack for finding top-shelf material which sounds autobiographical and mixing it with his own to craft a uniquely distinguishable musical statement." Matt Bjorke of Roughstock alluded to how "Welcome To The Fishbowl should easily join Kenny Chesney's past albums as #1-selling country records and there's no doubt that it's also amongst the best in his career, a career that is as strong now as it was promising 20 years ago". Taste of Country's Billy Dukes called it "...an album to turn to with frequency."

The moderately positive reviews come from The Boston Globe and the USA Today, which The Boston Globe music critic Stuart Munro noted the album for being "As consistent and meticulously constructed as ever, “Welcome to the Fishbowl” is die-cast Chesney", giving the album three and a half out of five stars, which is taken from the Metacritic assigned score. Jerry Shirver of the USA Today rated the album a two and a half out of four stars, and said that "Though the arrangements of these dozen tunes are up to date and his voice retains that bland average-Joe quality that the masses and radio programmers adore, most of the themes are calculated standard issue."

However, the album received mixed reviews from About.com, AllMusic, BBC Music, Country Weekly, Omaha World-Herald and the Rolling Stone. The worst review for the album came in from Jessica Nicholson of Country Weekly, who based on Metacritic assigned score rated the album a two and a half out of five stars, pointed to how "the album’s bound to leave some fans hoping Kenny will book another trip to the islands with his trusty acoustic and a cold drink, if only to find a balance between his previously lighthearted fare and the brooding material that abounds on this effort." Moreover, Nicholson vowed that "the superstar delves headlong into melancholy."

The three out of five star reviews were from About.com, AllMusic, BBC Music, which is based on the Metacritic assigned score, and the Rolling Stone. To this, Robert Silva of About.com highlighted that "While fans of the more upbeat Chesney may complain, Welcome to the Fishbowl shows Chesney continuing to evolve in ways that are encouraging." AllMusic's Stephen Thomas Erlewine alluded to how "this is a far cheerier affair" that "the cheeky title suggests". In closing, Erlewine stated that "Wedded to this warmth is a crisp clean sheen, a sound so bright that it threatens to get goofy when Chesney and crew rock out – they're no longer as urgent as they were even five years earlier, which gives the gurgling swing of the title track a stiff white-boy funkiness that isn't necessarily alienating – but such chipper charm permeates the entirety of Welcome to the Fishbowl, turning it into an everyday feel-good record, the kind that generates moments of warmth when heard fleetingly on the radio, at the grocery store, in a doctor's office, at work, or even at home." Leonie Cooper of BBC Music evoked how the album is "aimed squarely at the mainstream." The Rolling Stone music critic Chuck Eddy called this a "Fairly depressive, in total – but these days, Chesney sounds more convincing when he's less upbeat." At Omaha World-Herald, Kevin Coffey noted how the album "has the party vibe some Chesney fans will be looking for, but a closer look at the lyrics reveals it’s a rant against paparazzi, celebrities and a culture that glorifies everyone’s 15 minutes of fame."

== Commercial performance ==
Welcome to the Fishbowl debuted at number two on the US Billboard 200 chart with first-week sales of 193,000 copies in the United States, behind Justin Bieber's Believe. As of January 2013, the album has sold 592,286 copies in the United States. On February 13, 2017, the album was certified platinum by the Recording Industry Association of America (RIAA) for sales of over one million copies in the United States.

== Track listing ==
No.	Title	Writer(s)	Length
1.	"Come Over"	Sam Hunt; Shane McAnally; Josh Osborne	4:09
2.	"Feel Like a Rock Star" (with Tim McGraw)	Rodney Clawson; Chris Tompkins	3:28
3.	"Sing 'Em Good My Friend"	Tom Douglas; Jaren Johnston	4:38
4.	"Welcome to the Fishbowl"	Kenny Chesney; Skip Ewing	3:30
5.	"I'm a Small Town"	Keith Gattis	4:38
6.	"El Cerrito Place"	Gattis	5:52
7.	"Makes Me Wonder"	Chesney; Wendell Mobley; Neil Thrasher	3:13
8.	"While He Still Knows Who I Am"	Dave Berg; Douglas; Georgia Middleman	4:16
9.	"Time Flies"	Steve McEwan; Craig Wiseman	3:37
10.	"To Get to You (55th and 3rd)"	Chesney; Ewing	5:40
11.	"Always Gonna Be You"	Mike Reid	5:16
12.	"You and Tequila" (live with Grace Potter)	Matraca Berg; Deana Carter	4:49
Total length:			53:03

== Personnel ==
- David Angell – strings
- Monisa Angell – strings
- Janet Askey – strings
- Wyatt Beard – keyboards, background vocals
- Shannon Brown – background vocals
- Pat Buchanan – electric guitar, harmonica
- Buddy Cannon – background vocals
- Melonie Cannon – background vocals
- Jim Chapman – background vocals
- Kenny Chesney – lead vocals
- Jon Conley – acoustic guitar, background vocals
- David Davidson – strings
- Scott Ducaj – trumpet
- Chris Dunn – trombone
- Conni Ellisor – strings
- Shannon Finnegan – background vocals
- Justin Francis – background vocals
- Jim Gairrett – acoustic guitar
- Zachary Gore – background vocals
- Carl Gorodetzky – strings
- Kenny Greenberg – acoustic guitar, electric guitar
- Jim Grosjean – strings
- Rob Hajacos – fiddle
- Tim Hensley – background vocals
- Allison Herbstreit – background vocals
- Steve Hermann – trumpet
- John Hobbs – Hammond B-3 organ, piano, synthesizer, Wurlitzer
- Nicholas Hoffman – fiddle
- Jim Horn – tenor saxophone
- John Barlow Jarvis – piano
- Jack Jezzro – strings
- Aimee Johns – background vocals
- Mike Johnson – steel guitar
- Jaren Johnston – background vocals
- Anthony LaMarchina – strings
- Paul Leim – drums, percussion, shaker
- Don Lepore – background vocals
- Josiah Lightle – background vocals
- Shane McAnally – background vocals
- Randy McCormick – Hammond B-3 organ, piano, synthesizer
- Tim McGraw – vocals on "Feel Like a Rock Star"
- Steve Marshall – bass guitar
- Clayton Mitchell – electric guitar
- Carole Rabinowitz-Neuen – strings
- John Osborne – background vocals
- Mary Kathryn Van Osdale – strings
- Gary Van Osdale – strings
- Sean Paddock – drums
- Larry Paxton – bass guitar, string arrangements
- Kathryn Plummer – strings
- Grace Potter – duet vocals on "You and Tequila", background vocals on "El Cerrito Place"
- Gary Prim – piano
- Mickey Raphael – Jew's Harp
- Mike Reid – piano
- Sarighandi D Reist – strings
- Michael Rhodes – bass guitar
- Gemmi Richardson – background vocals
- Mason Richardson – background vocals
- Shaun Silva – background vocals
- Pamela Sixfin – strings
- Joanna Smith – background vocals
- Jere Smithers – background vocals
- Julia Tanner – strings
- Christian Teal – strings
- Alan Umstead – strings
- Catherine Umstead – strings
- Scott Vestal – banjo
- Christina Walker – background vocals
- Kristin Wilkenson – string arrangements
- John Willis – acoustic guitar, gut string guitar, mandolin
- Karen Winkleman – strings
- Craig Wiseman – background vocals

== Charts ==
=== Weekly charts ===
Chart (2012)	Peak position
Australian Albums (ARIA)	34
Canadian Albums (Billboard)	5
UK Country Albums (Official Charts)	3
US Billboard 200	2
US Top Country Albums (Billboard)	1

=== Year-end charts ===
Chart (2012)	Position
US Billboard 200	41
US Top Country Albums (Billboard)	12
Chart (2013)	Position
US Top Country Albums (Billboard)	38

== Certifications ==
Region	Certification	Certified units/sales
United States (RIAA)	Platinum	1,000,000^{^}
^{^} Shipments figures based on certification alone.
