= Jack Ingram (album) =

Studio album by Jack Ingram
- Released: September 1995
- Genre: Country
- Length: 43:42
- Label: Crystal Clear Sound
- Producer: Morgan Brown, Jimmy Gooch, Michael Mayer, Cary Pierce, Terry Slemmons, Brady Wood

Jack Ingram chronology
Jack Ingram (1995)	Live at Adair's (1995)

Professional ratings
Review scores
Source	Rating
Allmusic	4/5 stars

Jack Ingram is the debut studio album by country music artist Jack Ingram. Initially released independently in 1993, it was then the first of three albums released by Ingram on the Crystal Clear Sound label in 1995. No singles were released from this album. Most of the tracks from this album were re-released on the studio album Young Man in 2004 along with tracks from his second studio album, Lonesome Questions.

== Content ==
The majority of the album's tracks were written by Ingram. The opening track "Beat Up Ford" would become Ingram's trademark song in his early career as well as the name of his back-up band. It would be re-recorded for his second studio album, Lonesome Question. The track "Make My Heart Flutter" would be re-recorded as "Flutter" on Ingram's 1997 album Livin' or Dyin'.

The album also features several covers of classic songs. Merle Haggard's "Mama Tried" was first recorded by him in 1968 on the album of the same name. The album closes with covers of Willie Nelson's "Pick up the Tempo" from the 1978 album Waylon & Willie and Robert Earl Keen's 1989 song "The Road Goes on Forever".

Critic Bill Hobbs characterized the album as "a starker, more folk-leaning disc" compared to its follow-up.

== Track listing ==
All tracks composed by Jack Ingram unless noted

No.	Title	Writer(s)	Length
1.	"Beat Up Ford"		3:44
2.	"Sight Unseen"		2:44
3.	"Make My Heart Flutter"	Colin Boyd	2:37
4.	"Beyond My Means"		2:47
5.	"Mama Tried"	Merle Haggard	2:55
6.	"A Song for Amy"		4:35
7.	"Things Get Cloudy"		3:05
8.	"The Fisherman"		3:29
9.	"Me and You"		2:42
10.	"Drive On"		5:34
11.	"Pick Up the Tempo"	Willie Nelson	2:38
12.	"The Road Goes on Forever"	Robert Earl Keen	6:52

== Personnel ==
Taken from liner notes.

- Colin Boyd - electric guitar, harmonica, background vocals
- Jim Cocke - piano, keyboards, melodica
- Eric Delegard - bass guitar
- Brian Hartig - drums
- Jack Ingram - lead vocals, acoustic guitar, drums
- Clay Pendergrass - bass guitar
- Cary Pierce - acoustic guitar, background vocals
- Terry Slemmons - acoustic guitar, percussion, electric guitar, background vocals
- Rob Wilson - bass guitar
