= Life on a Rock =

Studio album by Kenny Chesney
- Released: April 30, 2013
- Recorded: December 2012 – January 2013
- Studios: Big Yard (Kingston, Jamaica); Blackbird (Nashville, Tennessee); Lion's Den (Los Angeles, California); Maui Recording (Maui, Hawaii); Ocean Way (Nashville, Tennessee); Sound Emporium (Nashville, Tennessee); Spyder J (London, UK)
- Genre: Country
- Length: 42:29
- Labels: Blue Chair; Columbia Nashville
- Producers: Buddy Cannon; Kenny Chesney; Elán (track 3)

Kenny Chesney chronology
| Welcome to the Fishbowl (2012) | Life on a Rock (2013) | The Big Revival (2014) |

Singles from Life on a Rock
- 1. "Pirate Flag" Released: February 4, 2013; 2. "When I See This Bar" Released: June 10, 2013

Life on a Rock is the fifteenth studio album by American country music artist Kenny Chesney. It was released on April 30, 2013 via Blue Chair and Columbia Records. Chesney co-wrote eight of the album's ten tracks and co-produced the album with Buddy Cannon. It was recorded in Los Angeles, Hawaii, Jamaica, Key West, London, and Nashville. The album includes the singles "Pirate Flag" and "When I See This Bar". This was Chesney's first album since 2008's Lucky Old Sun to not have a Top 40 hit on the pop chart. This was also his first album since 1996's Me and You to not produce a single number one hit on the country charts.

== Content ==
Country Weekly's Jon Freeman thought that "Lindy" and "Happy on the Hey Now" were "poignant sketches of people he's encountered over the years", and that some of the songs showed "the motivations behind his relentless career building". He criticized "Marley" and "It's That Time of Day" for "meander[ing] aimlessly", and thought that "Pirate Flag" did not fit thematically with the album.

Kenny Chesney stated that the last song "Happy on the Hey Now (A Song for Kristi)" was written in memoriam about Kristi Lynn Hansen (March 16, 1976 Sanford, Maine–March 6, 2012 Chapel Hill, North Carolina), She was a long-time resident and local of the island of Saint John in the U.S. Virgin Islands, where Chesney had a residence, and frequently lived on the island and in the city of Cruz Bay. Hansen was an employee of Woody's and La Tapa restaurants. Hey Now was the name of a boat that Hansen and Chesney used to have a jovial time during their stays on the island.

== Critical reception ==
Professional ratings
Aggregate scores
| Source | Rating |
|---|---|
| Metacritic | 67/100 |
Review scores
| Source | Rating |
| Allmusic | 4/5 stars |
| Calgary Herald | 3/5 stars |
| Country Weekly | B− |
| Los Angeles Times | 2/4 stars |
| Newsday | C+ |
| The Oakland Press | 3/4 stars |
| Roughstock | 4.5/5 stars |
| The Salt Lake Tribune | B |
| Taste of Country | 3/5 stars |
| USA Today | 2.5/4 stars |

Life on a Rock has received generally positive reviews from the critics. At Metacritic, a website which assigns a weighted average score to mainstream critics ratings and reviews, the album received a metascore of 67, based on six reviews. Stephen Thomas Erlewine of Allmusic noted how Chesney's "effort pays off", due to the fact that "this feels fuller, richer than any Chesney album in recent memory, but it's also unhurried and light, an ideal soundtrack for a long, lazy summer." Freeman of Country Weekly called the album "a mixed bag" that the "most exciting moments come when Kenny pushes his limits on something unusual", and found that Chesney "sounds genuinely exhausted, making his need for respite in the islands all the more understandable." Got Country Online's Phyllis Hunter rated the album a perfect five-stars, and affirmed that the album is "Chesney’s most personal, most confident journey yet, and oh yes, confidence is indeed a heady aphrodisiac."

At The Oakland Press, Gary Graff told that the release "makes sober pondering sound like a wholly engaging pursuit." Chuck Yarborough of The Plain Dealer graded the album a B+, which he called it "eight of the 10 cuts on this intensely personal", and noted that "perhaps his best album." Matt Bjorke of Roughstock stated that "if you truly take in the album for what it is, a strong, well-written and well-made album meant to take you out of whatever is chaotic in life, you'll be in for one of the best albums of Kenny Chesney's career." David Burger of The Salt Lake Tribune called the release "breezy", which he stated that "while the collection doesn’t break any new ground, and isn’t well-suited to blasting on a car stereo, it shows off Chesney’s always-comforting voice and song-writing talents that too rarely emerge." At the USA Today, Brian Mansfield evoked that "Chesney's always been able to live in the moment; now, he sounds like he's appreciating them more than ever." The Boston Globe's Sarah Rodman praised the album because she told that Chesney "hits a high-water mark."

At Calgary Herald, Mike Bell affirmed that "it's hard to imagine a more predictable collection of songs than the superstar’s 10-track cabana Life On A Rock." Taste of Country's Billy Dukes alluded to "perhaps the songwriting is clunky at times — and a few songs rely too heavily on his vocal talents instead of a captivating melody or story — but it’s difficult to criticize a project that’s so honest, and at times, vulnerable." At Newday, Glenn Gamboa found that the release "finds Chesney stretching into unfamiliar territory that he hasn't quite mastered yet", but according to Gamboa Chesney "should remember, though, that trying something new requires a little more effort." The New York Times's Jon Caramanica told that "Mr. Chesney is a superstar, the idea goes, and therefore can do what he wants", but "except when he can't, of course." At Los Angeles Times, Mikael Wood found that "Chesney's tone-deafness here seems especially egregious because it's surrounded by better, smarter material."

== Commercial performance ==
Life on a Rock debuted at number one on the US Billboard 200, selling 153,000 copies in its first week according to Nielsen SoundScan. As of December 2013, the album has sold 392,000 copies in the United States. On February 13, 2017, the album was certified gold by the Recording Industry Association of America (RIAA) for sales of over 500,000 copies in the United States.

== Track listing ==
| No. | Title | Writer(s) | Length |
|---|---|---|---|
| 1. | "Pirate Flag" | Ross Copperman; David Lee Murphy | 3:45 |
| 2. | "When I See This Bar" | Kenny Chesney; Keith Gattis | 6:02 |
| 3. | "Spread the Love" (with The Wailers and Elán) | Chesney; Elán; Aston "Familyman" Barrett; Carlton Barrett; Tyrone Downie; Brett James | 4:16 |
| 4. | "Lindy" | Chesney | 3:49 |
| 5. | "Coconut Tree" (with Willie Nelson) | Casey Beathard; Michael White; Monty Criswell | 3:24 |
| 6. | "It's That Time of Day" | Chesney | 4:53 |
| 7. | "Life on a Rock" | Chesney | 2:53 |
| 8. | "Marley" | Chesney; Tom Douglas | 4:48 |
| 9. | "Must Be Something I Missed" | Chesney; Mac McAnally | 3:10 |
| 10. | "Happy on the Hey Now (A Song for Kristi)" | Chesney | 5:26 |
| Total length: | | | 42:29 |

== Personnel ==
- Barry Bales – upright bass
- Aston "Family Man" Barrett – bass guitar, percussion
- Carlton Barrett – drums
- Wyatt Beard – background vocals
- Pat Buchanan – electric guitar
- Melonie Cannon – background vocals
- Kenny Chesney – lead vocals
- Junior "Chico" Chinn – trumpet
- Glen DeCosta – saxophone
- Eric Darken – percussion
- Tyrone Downie – keyboards, percussion
- Elán – vocals on "Spread the Love"
- Fred Eltringham – percussion
- Audley Freed – acoustic guitar
- Keith Gattis – acoustic guitar, background vocals
- Kenny Greenberg – acoustic guitar, baritone guitar
- Robert Greenidge – steel drums
- John Hobbs – Hammond B-3 organ, piano, synthesizer, Wurlitzer
- Paul Leim – drums
- Earl Lindo – organ
- Mac McAnally – acoustic guitar
- Willie Nelson – vocals on "Coconut Tree"
- Alvin "Seeco" Patterson – keyboards, percussion
- Larry Paxton – bass guitar, cello
- Mickey Raphael – harmonica
- Gretchen Rhodes – background vocals
- Ronald "Nambo" Robinson – trombone
- Brady Shammar – background vocals
- Earl "Chinna" Smith – electric guitar
- Adam Steffey – mandolin
- Jeffrey Taylor – accordion
- John Willis – acoustic guitar, gut string guitar, ukulele
- Lonnie Wilson – drums, shaker

== Charts ==
=== Weekly charts ===
| Chart (2013) | Peak position |
|---|---|
| Canadian Albums Chart | 4 |
| US Billboard 200 | 1 |
| US Billboard Top Country Albums | 1 |

=== Year-end charts ===
| Chart (2013) | Position |
|---|---|
| US Billboard 200 | 70 |
| US Top Country Albums (Billboard) | 16 |

== Certifications ==
| Region | Certification | Certified units/sales |
|---|---|---|
| United States (RIAA) | Gold | 500,000^{^} |
^{^} Shipments figures based on certification alone.
