= Barefoot and Crazy =

Single by Jack Ingram

from the album Big Dreams & High Hopes
- Released: March 30, 2009
- Genre: Country
- Length: 3:30
- Label: Big Machine
- Songwriters: Rhett Akins; Dallas Davidson; Ben Hayslip
- Producer: Jeremy Stover

Jack Ingram singles chronology
"That's a Man" (2008)	"Barefoot and Crazy" (2009)	"Seeing Stars" (2009)

"Barefoot and Crazy" is a song recorded by American country music artist Jack Ingram. It was released in March 2009 as the second single from his album Big Dreams & High Hopes. In late 2009, the song became Ingram's second Top Ten country hit, reaching number 10 on Billboard Hot Country Songs.

== Content ==
The song was written by The Peach Pickers, who comprise Rhett Akins, Dallas Davidson, and Ben Hayslip. While working on the song, Akins removed his flip-flops, and made a remark that his feet were interesting. This comment then led to the title "Barefoot and Wild," which later became "Barefoot and Crazy."

The song is an up-tempo with electric guitar accompaniment. The male narrator tells of wanting to get "barefoot and crazy" with his lover, which would be picking her up in her Chevrolet and partying with her by the water.

== Music video ==
The music video was directed by Stephen Shepherd and premiered on July 10, 2009.

== Critical reception ==
Kevin J. Coyne of Country Universe gave the song a C rating, calling it "virtually indistinguishable from anything you could hear on an oldies station that focuses on eighties light rock." Jonathan Keefe, in his album review for Slant Magazine, called the song "a bit too strident an attempt at crafting a summertime radio anthem."

== Chart performance ==
"Barefoot and Crazy" debuted at number 56 on the U.S. Billboard Hot Country Songs chart dated April 4, 2009. In September 2009, the song became Ingram's first Top 10 single on the country chart since "Wherever You Are" reached number 1 in 2006.

Chart (2009)	Peak position
US Hot Country Songs (Billboard)	10
US Billboard Hot 100	64

=== Year-end charts ===
Chart (2009)	Position
US Country Songs (Billboard)	47
