= Come Over (Kenny Chesney song) =

Single by Kenny Chesney

from the album Welcome to the Fishbowl
- Released: May 14, 2012
- Recorded: 2012
- Genre: Country
- Length: 4:08
- Label: Blue Chair; Columbia Nashville
- Songwriters: Sam Hunt; Shane McAnally; Josh Osborne
- Producers: Buddy Cannon; Kenny Chesney

Kenny Chesney singles chronology
"Feel Like a Rock Star" (2012)	"Come Over" (2012)	"El Cerrito Place" (2012)

Music video
- "Come Over" on YouTube

"Come Over" is a song written by Sam Hunt, Shane McAnally, and Josh Osborne and recorded by American country music singer Kenny Chesney. It was released in May 2012 as the second single from Chesney's 2012 album Welcome to the Fishbowl.

== Content ==
The song is set in the key of D♭ major with a main chord pattern of B♭m7–G♭sus2–D♭/F–D♭sus-D♭–A♭.

Co-writer Josh Osborne said that when writing the song, he and the co-writers were composing melodies when co-writer Sam Hunt suggested to make it a "kind of desperate thing, like the guy is pleading with this girl to come over". Upon reaching the chorus, they decided to repeat the phrase "come over" five times to "[get] into the emotion of the situation".

== Critical reception ==
Billy Dukes of Taste of Country gave the song three and a half stars out of five, writing that "the songwriters show power in efficiency, yet the singer never really conveys the physical need for this woman that the repetition begs for". Matt Bjorke of Roughstock gave the song four stars out of five, saying that it "shows off a completely different side for Kenny Chesney and it manages to feel immediate and current in ways that 'Feel Like a Rock Star' didn't".

== Music video ==
The music video was directed by Shaun Silva and premiered on June 5, 2012 on Great American Country. The music video alternates between scenes featuring Chesney and scenes featuring Courtney McCann. It was filmed in Fort Lauderdale, Florida with some ocean scenes near Miami Beach, Florida. Chesney has described the music video as a "classy booty call". It is entirely in black-and-white, and features a cameo from his dog, Poncho, standing on a paddleboard alongside Chesney.

== Chart performance ==
"Come Over" debuted at number 24 on the U.S. Billboard Hot Country Songs chart for the week of June 2, 2012. After spending eleven weeks on the Hot Country Songs chart, "Come Over" became Chesney's twenty-second number one single for the week of August 11, 2012. The song has sold over a million copies in the US.

=== Weekly charts ===
Chart (2012)	Peak position
Canada Hot 100 (Billboard)	48
Canada Country (Billboard)	1
US Billboard Hot 100	23
US Hot Country Songs (Billboard)	1

=== Year-end charts ===
Chart (2012)	Position
US Billboard Hot 100	76
US Country Songs (Billboard)	35

== Certifications ==
Region	Certification	Certified units/sales
United States (RIAA)	3× Platinum	3,000,000^{‡}
^{‡} Sales+streaming figures based on certification alone.

== Other versions ==
Co-writer Sam Hunt recorded a version of "Come Over" for his acoustic mixtape Between the Pines (2013). This recording entered the Billboard Hot Country Songs chart at number 42 following the mixtape's 2015 re-release on MCA Nashville. As of November 2015, Hunt's version has sold 14,000 units.
