= El Cerrito Place =

Single by Kenny Chesney

from the album Welcome to the Fishbowl
- Released: September 10, 2012
- Recorded: 2012
- Genre: Country
- Length: 5:52 (album version); 5:02 (radio edit)
- Label: Blue Chair; Columbia Nashville
- Songwriter: Keith Gattis
- Producers: Buddy Cannon; Kenny Chesney

Kenny Chesney singles chronology
"Come Over" (2012)	"El Cerrito Place" (2012)	"Pirate Flag" (2013)

"El Cerrito Place" is a song written by Keith Gattis. Originally recorded by Charlie Robison, it was also recorded by Kenny Chesney on his 2012 album Welcome to the Fishbowl, from which it was released as the third single in September 2012 .

== History ==
The song, written by Keith Gattis, was originally recorded by Gattis in 2002 for his own album Big City Blues. Charlie Robison then recorded it on his 2004 album Good Times. Robison's version was released as both a single and music video, but the single did not chart. The backing vocals on Robison's version were performed by Natalie Maines of The Chicks. Chesney's version includes a backing vocal from Grace Potter, with whom he recorded his 2011 single "You and Tequila".

== Content ==
The song is a mid-tempo in which the male narrator longs for a lost lover in California. Chesney said of the song that he enjoyed Robison's version for several years, and that "There is a certain longing in this song that in a lot of ways I really relate to. It's about wanting something that's obviously not there." Robison praised Chesney's version, saying that he "did a good job with it".

The song title refers to the El Cerrito Place Apartments at the base of the Hollywood Hills in the Hollywood neighborhood of Los Angeles, California, where Gattis lived while writing and recording the song. The song's and apartment's namesake street, off of Franklin Avenue, starts just north of the intersection of La Brea Ave. and Hollywood Blvd., which is consistent with the lyrics of the song.

== Critical reception ==
Chet Flippo, in an article on the song's history for CMT, said that "It's one song that in its different iterations links past and present. It truly shows the power of a single song." Billy Dukes of Taste of Country gave the song 4 ½ stars out of 5, saying that it "might be the most emotional performance of his career. It’s clear he’s falling back on his own experiences as he tells the story of a man looking for his love and maybe his soul."

== Chart performance ==
=== Weekly charts ===
Chart (2012–2013)	Peak position
Canada Country (Billboard)	31
US Billboard Hot 100	72
US Hot Country Songs (Billboard)	17
US Country Airplay (Billboard)	10

=== Year-end charts ===
Chart (2012)	Position
US Hot Country Songs (Billboard)	79

Chart (2013)	Position
US Country Airplay (Billboard)	76
US Hot Country Songs (Billboard)	86

== Certifications ==
Region	Certification	Certified units/sales
United States (RIAA)	Gold	500,000^{‡}
^{‡} Sales+streaming figures based on certification alone.
