= When I See This Bar =

Single by Kenny Chesney

from the album Life on a Rock
- Released: June 10, 2013
- Recorded: 2013
- Genre: Country
- Length: 6:03 (album version); 4:16 (radio edit)
- Label: Blue Chair/Columbia Nashville
- Songwriters: Kenny Chesney; Keith Gattis
- Producers: Kenny Chesney; Buddy Cannon

Kenny Chesney singles chronology
| "Pirate Flag" (2013) | "When I See This Bar" (2013) | "American Kids" (2014) |

"When I See This Bar" is a song co-written and recorded by American country music artist Kenny Chesney. It was released in June 2013 as the second single from his 2013 album Life on a Rock. The song was written by Chesney and Keith Gattis.

== Content ==
The song is a mid-tempo in which the narrator reflects on what he sees in a bar.

When asked by Country Music Television if the song referred to any particular bar, Chesney said that "There is, and I think we all have that place. You had your group of friends, you fell in love at that place, you fell out of love at that place, you met a lot of really interesting people and, over time, you don't realize that it's becoming a really important spot in your life. And then life has a way of taking each one of you and moving you along, and you don't really notice at the time, but all of a sudden, you're just not there anymore. And that's the root of this song. I think when we see that bar or we see that place, we don't see four walls. We see the laughter, we see the faces, we hear the music."

== Critical reception ==
Glenn Gamboa of Newsday said that the song was "John Mellencamp-influenced" and an example of Chesney's "country-rock wheelhouse". Gary Graff of The Oakland Press said that the song's "warm nostalgia" showed some of "the album's heart". Giving it 4.5 stars out of 5, Billy Dukes of Taste of Country also compared it favorably to Mellencamp, saying, "the lyrics feel as genuine and honest as the rocker’s best-known hits." He also called it "Smartly-written, but not pretentious. Wild, but not careless. Familiar, but not tired". Bobby Peacock of Roughstock gave the song 5 stars for the album version, saying that it has "evocative lyrics that set the mood" and that it "stands out for its detail and depth alone." He gave the song's radio edit a 4.5 star rating, saying that the verse missing from the radio edit "adds as much as the others do".

== Music video ==
The music video was directed by Shaun Silva and premiered on the USA Today website on July 18, 2013.

== Chart performance ==
Following the release of Life on a Rock, "When I See This Bar" charted at number 57 on Country Airplay from unsolicited airplay that predated its release as a single. It was one of four tracks to do so that week. The song re-entered at number 39 on the chart dated for the week ending June 22, 2013. It also debuted at number 97 on the U.S. Billboard Hot 100 chart for the week of August 10, 2013.

=== Weekly charts ===
| Chart (2013) | Peak position |
|---|---|
| Canada Country (Billboard) | 14 |
| US Billboard Hot 100 | 84 |
| US Country Airplay (Billboard) | 14 |
| US Hot Country Songs (Billboard) | 25 |

=== Year-end charts ===
| Chart (2013) | Position |
|---|---|
| US Country Airplay (Billboard) | 62 |
| US Hot Country Songs (Billboard) | 76 |
