= Maybe She'll Get Lonely =

Single by Jack Ingram

from the album This Is It
- Released: November 24, 2007
- Genre: Country
- Length: 3:24
- Label: Big Machine
- Songwriter(s): Jeremy Stover, John Kennedy, Jamie Paulin
- Producer(s): Jeremy Stover

Jack Ingram singles chronology
"Measure of a Man" (2007)	"Maybe She'll Get Lonely" (2007)	"That's a Man" (2008)

"Maybe She'll Get Lonely" is a song recorded by American country music artist Jack Ingram. It was released in November 2007 as the third single from the album This Is It. The song reached #24 on the Billboard Hot Country Songs chart. The song was written by Jeremy Stover, John Kennedy and Jamie Paulin.

== Critical reception ==
A review at countryuniverse.net said everything about this single is adequate. The song is good enough, the production gets the job done and it's sung with energy and conviction. It just doesn't add up to much more than a competent, professional record. There's no real spark, like his previous single "Measure of a Man" had. In the end, this is just radio filler.

== Chart performance ==
Chart (2007–2008)	Peak position
US Hot Country Songs (Billboard)	24
