= Hank Flamingo =

American country music group

- Hank Flamingo, 1994

Background information
- Origin: Lascassas, Tennessee, United States
- Genres: Country
- Years active: 1988–1994
- Label: Giant
- Past members: Eddie Grigg; Ben Northern; Stuart E. Stuart; Trent Summar; Philip Wallace; Roy Watts

Hank Flamingo was an American country music band founded in the late 1980s. Its membership comprised Trent Summar (lead vocals), Philip Wallace (guitar), Eddie Grigg (guitar, vocals), Ben Northern (bass guitar, vocals), Stuart E. Stuart (fiddle, vocals), and Roy Watts (drums). The band recorded one major-label studio album in 1994, before disbanding not long afterward. By 2000, frontman Trent Summar founded another group called Trent Summar & The New Row Mob, in which former Hank Flamingo guitarist Philip Wallace was also a member.

== Biography ==
Hank Flamingo was founded in 1989 in the state of Tennessee. Lead vocalist Trent Summar and his friend Eddie Grigg owned a farmhouse in Lascassas, Tennessee, where they began working on music together. They began working with other musicians until they decided to form a band. The band's name originated when a friend of Summar's gave him a plastic flamingo as a gift, which he mounted inside the farmhouse next to a portrait of Hank Williams.

By 1993, they were signed to a recording contract with Giant Records Nashville, which released the band's eponymous debut album the following year. Hank Flamingo made an appearance on the talk show Late Night with Conan O'Brien to promote their album. Included on the disc was a cover of George Jones' "White Lightning", along with songs written by John Hiatt and former NRBQ member Al Anderson. "Baby It's You" was the album's lead single.

Writing about the band in Billboard, Melinda Newman stated that " This new sextet comes on like a cross between Webb Wilder and the Georgia Satellites...Much of this release is way too quirky for country radio, but cuts such as 'Redneck Martians Stole My Baby' should make inroads at college and wacky alternative outlets." A review in the same magazine was mixed, stating that it "caters to new country audience by combining country and alternative rock. Unfortunately, the record is devoid of any surprises." Susan Beyer of The Ottawa Citizen was more positive, praising the band's sense of humor and "controlled thrashing" of their playing, although she criticized the slower songs on the album. Mario Tarradell of The Miami Herald similarly commended the band's humorous cuts such as "Redneck Martians Stole My Baby" and "Slaw", comparing the band favorably to Confederate Railroad.

Hank Flamingo disbanded after releasing only one album. Trent Summar founded another band known as Trent Summar & The New Row Mob, which also included former Hank Flamingo guitarist Philip Wallace.

== Discography ==
=== Albums ===
Title	Album details
Hank Flamingo	Release date: February 1, 1994; Label: Giant Records

=== Singles ===
Year	Single
1993	"Baby It's You"

=== Music videos ===
Year	Video	Director
1993	"Baby It's You"	John Lloyd Miller
