= Eleven Hundred Springs =

American country music group

Eleven Hundred Springs is a country music band from Dallas, Texas.

== History ==
Eleven Hundred Springs was founded by Matt Hillyer (lead vocalist, guitar, primary songwriter), Steven Berg (bass), and Richie Vasquez (drums) in 1998. Prior to forming Eleven Hundred Springs, Matt and Steven had played together in three previous bands, most notably the Dallas rockabilly band Lone Star Trio. The band's early days included a lengthy Monday night residency at Adair's in Deep Ellum. It was during this time that the band's first album, Welcome to Eleven Hundred Springs, was recorded, as well as Live at Adair's.

Over the years, the band has had several lineup changes, with key band member Jordan Hendrix joining the group in 2006.

The most recent, and what proved to be the band's final lineup was put together in October 2016.

On June 9, 2021, lead singer/songwriter Matt Hillyer announced via his Facebook page that, “with bittersweet feelings that we've decided to bring the band to an end.” They played a series of farewell shows through the end of 2021. On Friday November 26, 2021, the band played their final show at the Granada Theater in Dallas, Texas. Shortly after, Eleven Hundred Springs was scheduled to perform one additional show, at Billy Bob's Texas in Fort Worth. Due to illness in the band, the full band show that was scheduled did not happen.

On Saturday Feb 1, 2025, Eleven Hundred Springs reunited for one night only, to perform at a benefit show at the Longhorn Ballroom in Dallas Texas, along with the pop punk band Bowling For Soup. The theme of the show was "Punks & Pokes", inspired by the 1978 Longhorn Ballroom marquee listing that featured the English punk band the Sex Pistols and country music icon Merle Haggard.

== Band members ==
- Matt Hillyer - Lead guitar, lead vocals, songwriter
- Steven Berg - Upright and electric bass, backing vocals
- Jordan Hendrix - Fiddle
- Chad Rueffer - Lead guitar, backing vocals, some lead vocals, songwriter
- Ray Austin - Steel Guitar, dobro
- Christian Dorn - Percussion

== Former band members ==
- Drums - Richie Vasquez, Bruce Alford, Mark Reznicek (currently with The Toadies), Brian Ferguson, Arjuna Contreras
- Guitar - Chris Claridy (currently with Cody Jinks)
- Fiddle - Jason Garner
- Steel guitar - Aaron Wynne, Danny Crelin, Burton Lee

== Albums ==
- Recorded Live At The Double Wide In Dallas Texas (Eleven Hundred Springs, 2024)
- Here 'Tis (State Fair Records, 2020)
- The Finer Things in Life (Eleven Hundred Springs, 2018)
- Midway (Eleven Hundred Springs, 2012)
- Eight the Hard Way (Smith Music, 2011)
- This Crazy Life (Smith Music, 2010)
- Country Jam (Palo Duro Records, 2008)
- Bandwagon (Palo Duro Records, 2004)
- Texas Unplugged, Vol 1 (Palo Duro Records, 2004)
- Broken Dreams, EP (Last Beat Records, 2003)
- Waylon Jennings, The Red River Tribute Compilation (Omaha, 2003)
- Straighter Line (13 Recordings, 2001)
- No Stranger to the Blues (13 Recordings, 2000)
- Live at Adair's Saloon (13 Recordings, 1999)
- Welcome to Eleven Hundred Springs (13 Recordings, 1998)

== See also ==
- Outlaw country
- Alternative country
- Rockabilly
- Red Dirt
