= Live: Wherever You Are =

2006 album by Jack Ingram

Live album (with studio tracks) by Jack Ingram
- Released: January 10, 2006
- Genre: Country
- Label: Big Machine
- Producer: Jeremy Stover

Jack Ingram chronology
Acoustic Motel (2005)	Live: Wherever You Are (2006)	This Is It (2007)

Singles from Live: Wherever You Are
- 1. "Wherever You Are" Released: November 1, 2005; 2. "Love You" Released: June 5, 2006

Live: Wherever You Are is a 2006 album by American country music artist Jack Ingram. His first album for Big Machine Records, it is largely a live album, although it features two studio tracks respectively entitled "Wherever You Are" and "Love You", both of which were released as singles. The former became Ingram's breakthrough hit, having reached number one on the Billboard Hot Country Songs charts in 2006.

== Content ==
Although mostly composed of live tracks, the album contains two original studio recordings. These are "Wherever You Are" and "Love You". Much of the content was recorded at Gruene Hall in Texas and was originally released independently in 2004 as Happy Happy. Upon re-release for Big Machine Records, the album had some tracks removed and the two studio cuts added. Also added was "Never Knocked Me Down", which Ingram and then-labelmate Danielle Peck originally recorded for the concert series CMT Outlaws (on CMT) in 2005. Live: Wherever You Are was the first release for Big Machine.

Both "Wherever You Are" and "Love You" were issued as singles, charting on Billboard Hot Country Songs in 2006. The former was the first number-one single for the Big Machine label.

== Critical reception ==
Brian Wahlert of Country Standard Time reviewed the album favorably, writing that "Ingram distinguishes himself with fantastic songs and a stage energy that's palpable on this live recording." Thom Jurek of AllMusic was less favorable, criticizing the album's flow due to the presence of the CMT Outlaws recording and studio recordings.

== Track listing ==
No.	Title	Writer(s)	Length
1.	"Hello" (spoken word intro by Ingram)		0:36
2.	"Wherever You Are" (studio track)	Steve Bogard, Jeremy Stover	3:37
3.	"I Would"	Jim Lauderdale, Jack Ingram	3:59
4.	"How Many Days?"	Lauderdale, Terry McBride	4:29
5.	"Work This Out"	Lauderdale, Ingram	4:51
6.	"One Thing"	Ingram	4:16
7.	"Only Daddy That'll Walk the Line"	Jimmy Bryant	4:35
8.	"Biloxi"	Ingram	4:59
9.	"Mustang Burn"	Ingram, Gus Salmon, Bill Longhorse	5:25
10.	"Happy Happy (Country Country)"	Ingram	3:13
11.	"Barbie Doll"	Todd Snider, Ingram	6:21
12.	"Goodnight Moon"	Gwil Owen, Will Kimbrough	4:41
13.	"Never Knocked Me Down" (featuring Danielle Peck)	Carl Hayes, Bukka Allen, Ingram	4:03
14.	"Love You" (studio track)	Trent Summar, Jay Knowles	3:30

== Personnel ==
=== Live Tracks ===
- Bukka Allen — Hammond organ, piano
- Pete Coatney — drums
- Shannon Forrest — drums on "Never Knocked Me Down"
- Paul Franklin — steel guitar on "Never Knocked Me Down"
- Jack Ingram — lead vocals, acoustic guitar, electric guitar
- Robert Kearns — bass guitar, background vocals
- Brent Mason — electric guitar on "Never Knocked Me Down"
- Danielle Peck — duet vocals on "Never Knocked Me Down"
- Jens Pinkernell — electric guitar, background vocals
- Michael Rhodes — bass guitar on "Never Knocked Me Down"
- Matt Rollings — keyboards on "Never Knocked Me Down"
- Biff Watson — acoustic guitar on "Never Knocked Me Down"

=== Studio Tracks ===
- Larry Franklin — mandolin on "Wherever You Are"
- Tommy Harden — drums on "Love You"
- Jack Ingram — lead vocals
- Mike Johnson — steel guitar on "Wherever You Are"
- Doug Kahan — bass guitar
- Troy Lancaster — electric guitar, sitar on "Wherever You Are"
- Paul Leim — drums on "Wherever You Are"
- Mike Rojas — piano, Hammond organ on "Love You"
- Steve Sheehan — acoustic guitar
- Joe Spivey — fiddle on "Love You"
- Russell Terrell — background vocals

== Chart performance ==
Chart (2006)	Peak position
US Heatseekers Albums (Billboard)	9
US Top Country Albums (Billboard)	33
