= What Can Be Done at This Point =

What Can Be Done At This Point

Studio album by Elan
- Released: 2007
- Genre: Alternative rock
- Label: Abbywho Records

Elan chronology
London Express (2005)	What Can Be Done At This Point (2007)	Shine (2008)

Singles from What Can Be Done at This Point
- 1. "Don't Want You in" Released: 2007; 2. "Made Myself Invisible" Released: 2007; 3. "This Time Around" Released: 2008

What Can Be Done at This Point is the third album by Mexican alternative rock singer, Elan. The album was released in early May 2007. The title track, What Can Be Done at This Point, is a tribute to the deceased crew of the Space Shuttle Challenger. The track contains audio of the transmission between Challenger and mission control of the day of the tragedy. The track number 6, Don't Want You in, was the lead single off the album.

== Track listing ==
1. The Winning Numbers (6:26)
2. Roll Like Dice (3:19)
3. My Last Sting (3:28)
4. Made Myself Invisible (3:07)
5. This Time Around (3:11)
6. Don't Want You in (4:06)
7. Awake (3:15)
8. I (5:01)
9. What Can Be Done at This Point (4:01)
10. At the Edge of the World (2:34)

== Don't Want You in ==
"Don't Want You in" is the lead single from the album What Can Be Done at This Point. It's also the sixth track on that album.
