= Midnight (Elán song) =

Single by Elan

from the album Street Child
- Released: 2003
- Genre: Alternative rock
- Label: Silverlight Records

Elan singles chronology
| "Midnight" | "They Came from the City" |

"Midnight" is the first single taken from the album Street Child by Mexican alternative rock singer Elan. It was released in Mexico on June 13, 2003. Elan fans brought 3 national servers down in Mexico with email requests for this song. This single reached #1 in airplay in most Mexican territories and stayed on top for ten weeks without changing its position. The single also reached #28 in Australia. There are 2 edits of the music video, one with black and white handycam footage of her interposed, and the other one without those scenes added.

== Track listing ==
1. Midnight (4:32)
2. Midnight (acoustic re-mix) (4:21)

== Charts ==
| Chart (2003) | Peak position |
|---|---|
| Australia (ARIA) | 28 |
