= Love You (song) =

Single by Jack Ingram

from the album Live: Wherever You Are
- Released: June 5, 2006
- Recorded: 2005
- Genre: Country, Texas country
- Length: 3:31 (album version)
- Label: Big Machine
- Songwriters: Jay Knowles; Trent Summar
- Producer: Jeremy Stover

Jack Ingram singles chronology
"Wherever You Are" (2005)	"Love You" (2006)	"Lips of an Angel" (2006)

"Love You" is a song by American country music artist Jack Ingram. It was written by Jay Knowles and Trent Summar. The song was released on June 5, 2006, as the second single from Ingram's album Live: Wherever You Are. It is one of the two studio tracks on the album, which is otherwise a live compilation album.

== Content ==
The song is considered a "kiss-off" song. Its lyrics feature several phrases where the word "fuck" is replaced with the word "love", most notably in the chorus ("Love you, love this town / Love this mother-lovin' truck that keeps breakin' lovin' down"). There are also more traditional replacements in the song, with "dang" ("damn"), "heck" ("hell"), and "shoot" ("shit") appearing several times in the first verse.

== Music video ==
The music video was directed by Shaun Silva and premiered on June 22, 2006. It shows Ingram performing in a bar, while his girlfriend is outside destroying a pickup truck, which she assumes is Jack's. She scratches "love you" in the paint of the hood with her car keys, uses a baseball bat to break the windows, and finally shoots out the tires with a shotgun. Jack then comes out of the bar at the end of the song, laughs at the vandalized truck, and then leaves in his own truck, parked several spaces away. The actual owner of the vandalized truck—a large, muscular man in a leather vest—comes out of the bar and surveys the damage to his truck, just as the girl flees the scene. The video uses a longer version of the song, with an extended 1-minute outro.

The music video reached number 1 on CMT's Top Twenty Countdown for the week of October 26, 2006.

== Chart positions ==
Chart (2006)	Peak position
US Hot Country Songs (Billboard)	12
US Billboard Hot 100	87

=== Year-end charts ===
Chart (2006)	Position
US Country Songs (Billboard)	60

== Other versions ==
- The original studio version from Live: Wherever You Are is also included as an album cut on Ingram's 2007 album This Is It.
- Trent Summar & The New Row Mob recorded "Love You" for their 2006 album Horseshoes & Hand Grenades.
