= Measure of a Man (Jack Ingram song) =

Single by Jack Ingram

from the album This Is It
- Released: April 23, 2007
- Genre: Country
- Length: 3:17
- Label: Big Machine
- Songwriters: Radney Foster; Gordie Sampson
- Producer: Jeremy Stover

Jack Ingram singles chronology
"Lips of an Angel" (2006)	"Measure of a Man" (2007)	"Maybe She'll Get Lonely" (2007)

"Measure of a Man" is a song written by Radney Foster and Gordie Sampson and recorded by American country music artist Jack Ingram. It was released in April 2007 as the second single from Ingram's album This Is It.

== Critical reception ==
Kevin John Coyne of Country Universe gave the song an A− grade, calling it a "well-written story" and saying "it sounds like something that actually might have happened in real life."

== Music video ==
The music video was directed by Shaun Silva and premiered on May 31, 2007. It starts with Ingram finishing a call in a phone booth, before driving off in his vintage car. Eventually the car breaks down and he calls a mechanic (played by his own father) and he comes to help him with the car. He hands his dad a picture of his family, scared of what his father's reaction will be. The father accepts, and emotionally the two embrace. Ingram is also seen performing the song with his band under an overpass (the same one his car breaks down under). The video makes use of multi-screening in certain scenes (mainly the band performance).

== Chart performance ==
The song debuted at number 54 on the U.S. Billboard Hot Country Songs chart for the week of April 28, 2007.

Chart (2007)	Peak position
US Hot Country Songs (Billboard)	18
US Bubbling Under Hot 100 (Billboard)	8
