= Street Child =

Studio album by Elan
- Released: 2003
- Recorded: 2002
- Genre: Alternative rock
- Label: Silverlight Records, Festival Records Australia

Elan chronology
Street Child (2003)	London Express (2005)

Alternative cover
- Limited edition digipak cover

Alternative cover
- Australian edition cover

Street Child is a debut album by Mexican alternative rock vocalist, Elan. It contains her biggest hit, Midnight.

Ricardo Burgos from Sony Music called Street Child "a history making release in Latin America".

== Track listing ==
=== Re-edition track listing ===
1. Leave Me (3:52)
2. Midnight (4:33)
3. Sorry Baby (4:23)
4. Hideaway (5:18)
5. Jeremy (3:49)
6. The Road (4:53)
7. They Came From the City (3:39)
8. Shy (4:05)
9. So Happy (9:04)
10. Call Home (4:30)
11. Time (4:27)
12. Street Child (10:08 – features Slash (musician) - contains a hidden track)
  - Perfect Life (hidden track) (3:36)

=== International Edition track listing ===
1. Leave Me (3:53)
2. Midnight (4:33)
3. Sorry Baby (4:22)
4. Hideaway (5:18)
5. Jeremy (3:49)
6. The Road (4:53)
7. They Came From the City (3:39)
8. Shy (4:05)
9. Another Woman (3:58)
10. Call Home (4:30)
11. Time (4:27)
12. Street Child (10:08 - contains a hidden track)
  - Perfect Life (hidden track) (3:35)

== Singles ==
- Midnight
- They Came From the City
- Hideaway
- Street Child
- Time
