= Palo Duro Records =

American record label

Palo Duro Records is an independent record label established in 2001 to focus primarily on Texas-based singer-songwriters and bands. The label specializes in musical styles from the Americana, country music, alternative country and Texas music genres.

Artists featured on the roster include The Derailers, Jon Christopher Davis, Trent Summar & The New Row Mob, Ed Burleson, Brian Burns, Eleven Hundred Springs, Morrison-Williams, Two Tons of Steel, Walt Wilkins, Tommy Alverson and Dale Watson. The label has also launched a music series, Texas Unplugged, which features original acoustic recordings by a variety of artists.
