= Electric (Jack Ingram album) =

Studio album by Jack Ingram
- Released: June 4, 2002
- Studio: Ocean Way Recording, Back Stage Studios, New Reflections and Deepfield Studios (Nashville, Tennessee); Madison Garage (Madison, Tennessee)
- Genre: Country
- Length: 42:09
- Label: Lucky Dog
- Producer: Mike McCarthy; Frank Liddell

Jack Ingram chronology
Hey You (1999)	Electric (2002)	Electric: Extra Volts (2003)

Singles from Electric
- 1. "One Thing" Released: 2002

Professional ratings
Review scores
Source	Rating
Allmusic	3/5 stars

Electric is the fifth studio album, released in 2002, by American country music artist Jack Ingram. The only single released was, "One Thing" which failed to chart. In 2003 an EP titled Electric: Extra Volts was released which contained five songs left off this album.

== Track listing ==
No.	Title	Writer(s)	Length
1.	"Keep On Keepin' On"	Jack Ingram, Tom Littlefield	3:05
2.	"Fool"	Ingram, Littlefield	4:39
3.	"What Makes You Say?"	Ingram, Littlefield, Bruce Robison	4:03
4.	"One Thing"	Ingram	4:15
5.	"Everybody"	Ingram	3:15
6.	"One Lie Away"	Ingram, Jim Lauderdale	2:46
7.	"We're All In This Together"	Ingram, Littlefield	3:15
8.	"I Won't Go With Her"	Scott Miller	3:22
9.	"You Never Leave"	Ingram	3:53
10.	"Pete, Jesus And Me"	Ingram	4:27
11.	"Goodnight Moon"	Will Kimbrough, Gwil Owen	5:09

== Personnel ==
=== Musicians ===
- Jack Ingram – lead vocals, backing vocals, acoustic guitar, electric guitar, percussion
- Bukka Allen – keyboards
- John Hobbs – keyboards
- Jay Joyce – keyboards, programming, acoustic guitar, electric guitar, bass, percussion, additional arrangements
- Richard Bennett – acoustic guitar
- Bob Britt – acoustic guitar, electric guitar, backing vocals
- Jon Dee Graham – acoustic guitar, electric guitar
- Kenny Greenberg – electric guitar
- David Grissom – electric guitar
- Tommy Hannum – slide guitar, steel guitar
- Tom Littlefield – acoustic guitar, backing vocals (1, 4, 7, 10)
- Paul Franklin – steel guitar
- Chris Feinstein – bass
- Glenn Worf – bass
- Pete Coatney – drums, percussion
- Chad Cromwell – drums
- Sam Bacco – percussion
- Eric Darken – percussion
- Giles Reaves – percussion
- Rob Hajacos – fiddle
- Peter Hyrka – fiddle
- Anthony Martin – backing vocals (2)
- Patty Griffin – backing vocals (3, 4)
- Lee Ann Womack – backing vocals (4)
- Bruce Robison – backing vocals (6)
- Buddy Miller – backing vocals (8)

=== Production ===
- Anthony Martin – A&R direction
- Frank Liddell – producer
- Mike McCarthy – producer, recording, mixing (1, 3–11)
- Chuck Ainlay – mixing (2)
- Chad Brown – recording assistant, mix assistant (1, 3–11)
- David Bryant – recording assistant, mix assistant (1, 3–11), additional engineer
- Leslie Richter – recording assistant, mix assistant (1, 3–11)
- Glenn Spinner – recording assistant, mix assistant (1, 3–11)
- Clint Woolsey – recording assistant, mix assistant (1, 3–11)
- Doug Delong – mix assistant (2)
- Tony Castle – additional engineer
- Gene Eichelberger – additional engineer
- Patrick Himes – additional engineer
- Jay Joyce – additional engineer
- Jim Lightman – additional engineer
- King Williams – additional engineer
- Hank Williams – mastering at MasterMix (Nashville, Tennessee)
- Michael Hiatt – A&R coordinator
- Kay Smith – A&R coordinator
- Deb Haus – art direction, artist development
- Beth Kindig – art direction, design
- Frank W. Ockenfels III – photography
- Vicki Russell – creative production
- Vector Management – management

== Chart performance ==
Chart (2002)	Peak position
U.S. Billboard Top Country Albums	34
U.S. Billboard Top Heatseekers	23
