= Pirate Flag (song) =

Single by Kenny Chesney

from the album Life on a Rock
- Released: February 4, 2013
- Recorded: December 2012 – January 2013
- Genre: Country
- Length: 3:45
- Label: Blue Chair/Columbia Nashville
- Songwriters: Ross Copperman; David Lee Murphy
- Producers: Buddy Cannon; Kenny Chesney

Kenny Chesney singles chronology
"El Cerrito Place" (2012)	"Pirate Flag" (2013)	"When I See This Bar" (2013)

"Pirate Flag" is a song recorded by American country music artist Kenny Chesney. It was released in February 2013, as the first single from his fifteenth studio album Life on a Rock (2013). The song was written by Ross Copperman and David Lee Murphy.

== Critical reception ==
Billy Dukes of Taste of Country gave the song three stars out of five, writing that "the more organic approach on this song is a breath of fresh air" and "the melody isn’t immediately catchy, but the arrangement bounces along in a pleasing manner." Matt Bjorke of Roughstock gave the song four stars out of five, saying that it "may not excite early Kenny Chesney fans all that much but for the rest of the modern Country Music listening audience it's a song that fits well within what radio is playing."

== Music video ==
The music video was directed by Shaun Silva and premiered in February 2013.

== Chart performance ==
"Pirate Flag" debuted at number 22 on the U.S. Billboard Country Airplay chart for the week of February 16, 2013. It also debuted at number 35 on the U.S. Billboard Hot Country Songs chart for the week of February 16, 2013. It also debuted at number 68 on the U.S. Billboard Hot 100 chart for the week of February 23, 2013. It also debuted at number 81 on the Canadian Hot 100 chart for the week of February 23, 2013.

=== Weekly charts ===
Chart (2013)	Peak position
Canada Hot 100 (Billboard)	53
Canada Country (Billboard)	6
US Billboard Hot 100	46
US Country Airplay (Billboard)	3
US Hot Country Songs (Billboard)	7

=== Year-end charts ===
Chart (2013)	Position
US Country Airplay (Billboard)	36
US Hot Country Songs (Billboard)	34

== Certifications ==
Certifications for "Pirate Flag"
Region	Certification	Certified units/sales
United States (RIAA)	Platinum	1,000,000^{‡}
^{‡} Sales+streaming figures based on certification alone.
