= Feel Like a Rock Star =

Single by Kenny Chesney and Tim McGraw

from the album Welcome to the Fishbowl
- Released: April 2, 2012
- Recorded: 2012
- Genre: Country; country rock
- Length: 3:28
- Label: BNA
- Songwriters: Rodney Clawson; Chris Tompkins
- Producer: Buddy Cannon

Kenny Chesney singles chronology
"Reality" (2011)	"Feel Like a Rock Star" (2012)	"Come Over" (2012)

Tim McGraw singles chronology
"Better Than I Used to Be" (2011)	"Feel Like a Rock Star" (2012)	"Right Back Atcha Babe" (2012)

"Feel Like a Rock Star" is a song written by Chris Tompkins and Rodney Clawson and recorded by American country music artists Kenny Chesney and Tim McGraw. It was released in April 2012 as the first single from Chesney's 2012 album Welcome to the Fishbowl. It is also Chesney’s last single to be released by BNA Records, a label he had been with since 1995.

== History ==
Chesney recorded the song as a duet with McGraw and premiered it at the Academy of Country Music Awards show, broadcast on April 1, 2012. The two toured together in mid-2012.

== Music video ==
The music video, which was directed by Shaun Silva and edited by Scott Mele, depicts Chesney and McGraw performing at an airport. Rodney Clawson and Chris Tompkins wrote the song. Clawson told Taste of Country that Tompkins had begun the song with a bass guitar line, when the two observed that "everybody wants to feel like a rock star."

== Critical reception ==
Rating it four-and-a-half stars out of five, Billy Dukes of Taste of Country favorably compared it to "Young" and "Big Star".

== Chart performance ==
The song debuted at number 13 on the Hot Country Songs chart for the week of April 21, 2012. It is Chesney's highest-debuting single, the previous record-holder being "Don't Blink", which debuted at number 16. It is also the second highest-debuting single since January 1990, when the charts were first tabulated electronically by Nielsen SoundScan, and the highest-debuting duet on that chart in that same timespan. Despite this high debut, the song peaked at number 11 on the Hot Country Songs chart for the week of May 26, 2012, becoming Chesney's first single to miss the top ten since "The Tin Man" peaked at number 19 in 2001. On the following week, "Feel Like a Rock Star" fell to number 18 while the follow-up single "Come Over" debuted at number 24.

This high debut was achieved mainly by the song receiving 979 plays by radio stations on Billboard's survey in the day after the broadcast, most of which came from hourly airplay on stations owned by Clear Channel Communications.

=== Weekly charts ===
Chart (2012)	Peak position
Canada Hot 100 (Billboard)	33
Canada Country (Billboard)	9
US Billboard Hot 100	40
US Hot Country Songs (Billboard)	11

=== Year-end charts ===
Chart (2012)	Position
US Country Songs (Billboard)	75

== Certifications ==
Region	Certification	Certified units/sales
United States (RIAA)	Gold	500,000^{^}
^{^} Shipments figures based on certification alone.

== Parodies ==
- American parody musician Cledus T. Judd released a parody of "Feel Like a Rock Star" titled "Feel Like a Pawn Star" on his 2012 album Parodyziac!!.
