= Keith Gattis (album) =

Studio album by Keith Gattis
- Released: April 30, 1996
- Genre: Country
- Label: RCA Nashville
- Producer: Norro Wilson

Keith Gattis chronology
Keith Gattis (1996)	Big City Blues (2005)

Keith Gattis is the self-titled debut album of American country music singer Keith Gattis. It was released in 1996 via RCA Records. The album includes the singles "Little Drops of My Heart", which peaked at number 53 on Hot Country Songs, and "Real Deal".

== Critical reception ==
Chuck Hamilton of Country Standard Time gave the album a positive review, saying that Gattis "covers a variety of hard country styles and has the vocal equipment to handle it all convincingly." It received 4.5 stars out of 5 from Michael McCall of Allmusic, who compared Gattis' voice favorably to Johnny Paycheck and George Jones.

== Track listing ==
All songs written by Keith Gattis except as noted.

1. "Real Deal" (Gattis, Jim Dowell) — 3:08
2. "Everywhere I See You There" — 3:25
3. "The Puppet" — 3:32
4. "Back in Your Arms" — 3:12
5. "Whoop-De-Do" (Jeff Carson, Buddy Blackmon, Vip Vipperman) — 2:50
6. "Little Drops of My Heart" — 3:51
7. "Scrapin' Off the Pain" — 3:23
8. "Heartache Hero" (Kim Williams, Ron Harbin, Kim Tribble) — 2:46
9. "Only Lonely Fool" — 3:32
10. "Look Out Below" (Gattis, James T. Heffernan) — 2:42

== Personnel ==
Compiled from liner notes.

=== Musicians ===
- Harold Bradley — tic tac bass
- Mark Casstevens — acoustic guitar
- Glen Duncan and Rob Hajacos — twin fiddles
- Keith Gattis — vocals, acoustic guitar
- Paul Leim — drums
- Larry Marrs — bass guitar, background vocals
- Brent Mason — electric guitar
- Hargus "Pig" Robbins — piano
- Hal Rugg — steel guitar
- Marty Stuart — mandolin

=== Technical ===
- Don Cobb — digital editing
- Carlos Greer — digital editing
- Joe Hayden — assistant engineer
- Amy Hughes — assistant engineer
- Ken Hutton — assistant engineer
- Sandy Jenkins — assistant engineer
- Tom King — assistant engineer
- John Kunz — assistant engineer
- Warren Peterson — overdubs
- Denny Purcell — mastering
- Chris Rowe — digital editing
- Steve Sexton — assistant engineer
- Dave Sinco — overdubs
- Brian Tankersley — mixing
- Rhett Travis — assistant engineer
- King Williams — assistant engineer
- Norro Wilson — producer

== Chart performance ==
Year	Single	Peak chart positions	
Year	Single	US Country	CAN Country
1996	"Little Drops of My Heart"	53	63
1996	"Real Deal"	—	83
"—" denotes releases that did not chart
