= Two Tons of Steel =

Rockabilly and Texas country band

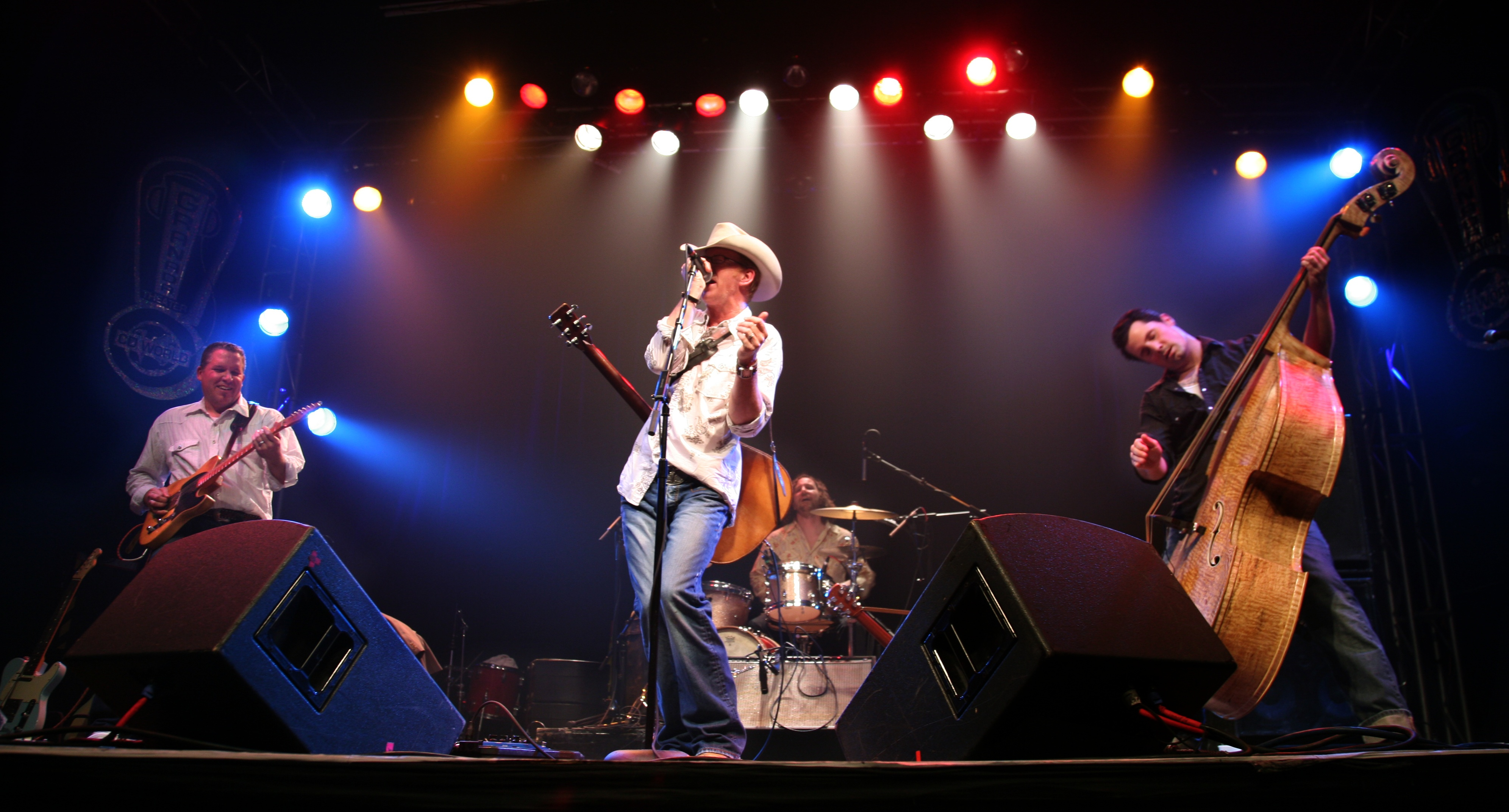

Background information
- Origin: San Antonio, Texas, United States
- Genres: Country; alternative Country; Americana; rockabilly
- Years active: 1990–present
- Labels: Smith, Palo Duro, Big Bellied
- Members: Kevin Geil (Lead Vocals/Rhythm Guitar); Rich Alcorta (Drums/Background Vocals); JD Larish (Bass); Stephen James (Lead Guitar/Background Vocals)
- Past members: Ralph Barrios; Eric Sibel; Ric Ramirez; Chris Dodds; Steve Hartwell; Dennis Fallon; Chris Rhoades
- Website: twotons.com

Two Tons of Steel is an American rockabilly and Texas country band, from San Antonio, Texas, United States.

The band has performed live at Gruene Hall, and has appeared in the IMAX film Texas: The Big Picture. The band's performance of "King of a One Horse Town" is included in a roots-country documentary that screens continuously at Nashville's Country Music Hall of Fame.

Two Tons of Steel continues as an institution at Texas’ Gruene Hall, where its annual Two Ton Tuesdays summer series draws 12,000 fans, and as a popular act at Nashville's Grand Ole Opry. They have been repeatedly voted "Best Country Band" by the San Antonio Current, one of its hometown weeklies.

== Discography ==
- "Two Tons of Steel" (1993)
- Oh No! (1994)
- Crazy for My Baby (1995)
- Ten Dollar Cover (1997)
- King of a One Horse Town (1999)
- Transparent (2001)
- Vegas (2004)
- Live from Gruene Hall (2005)
- Not That Lucky (2010)
- Tangled in Tinsel (2012)
- Unraveled (2013)
- Gone (2016)
