= Keith Gattis =

American country music singer-songwriter (1970–2023)

- Born: Quenton Keith Gattis; May 26, 1970; Georgetown, Texas, U.S.
- Origin: Nashville, Tennessee, U.S.
- Died: April 23, 2023 (aged 52)
- Genres: Country
- Occupations: Musician; songwriter; record producer
- Instruments: Vocals; guitar
- Years active: 1996–2023
- Labels: RCA Nashville; Smith Music Group

Quenton Keith Gattis (May 26, 1970 – April 23, 2023) was an American country music singer-songwriter, guitarist, and record producer. He released two studio albums and charted one single, "Little Drops of My Heart", on the Billboard Hot Country Singles & Tracks chart while signed to RCA Nashville. In 2002, Gattis joined Dwight Yoakam's band as band leader and lead electric guitar player and is credited on Yoakam's studio album Blame the Vain. In 2005, Gattis released his record Big City Blues.

Gattis collaborated on records with George Jones, George Strait, Kenny Chesney, Willie Nelson, Kid Rock, Randy Houser, Charlie Robison, Gary Allan, Ashley Monroe, Allison Moorer, Waylon Payne, Miranda Lambert, Wade Bowen, Sara Evans, Dwight Yoakam, Brandy Clark, Randy Rogers Band, Randy Travis, Eli Young Band, and others.

Kenny Chesney recorded two of Gattis' songs for his 2012 album Welcome to the Fishbowl. One of the songs, "El Cerrito Place", previously on Gattis' Big City Blues record, was released by Chesney and charted as a Billboard top 20 single. "El Cerrito Place" was also recorded by Charlie Robison featuring Natalie Maines. Gattis co-wrote Chesney's 2013 single "When I See This Bar" from the album Life on a Rock, and George Strait's 2013 single "I Got a Car". Gattis had numerous film and television placements including songs in The Jacket, Sicario, and Nashville. Gattis produced and co-wrote projects for many artists including Waylon Payne, Kendell Marvel, Wade Bowen, Randy Houser, Cory Morrow, and Micky & the Motorcars.

Gattis died in a tractor accident on April 23, 2023, at the age of 52.

== Discography ==
=== Albums ===
Title	Album details
Keith Gattis	Release date: April 30, 1996; Label: RCA Nashville
Big City Blues	Release date: May 10, 2005; Label: Smith Music Group

=== Singles ===
Year	Single	Peak chart positions		Album
Year	Single	US Country	CAN Country	Album
1996	"Little Drops of My Heart"	53	63	Keith Gattis
1996	"Real Deal"	—	83	Keith Gattis
1997	"Titanic"	—	—	Switchback soundtrack
"—" denotes releases that did not chart

=== Music videos ===
Year	Video	Director
1996	"Little Drops of My Heart"	
1996	"Real Deal"	Thom Oliphant

== List of singles written by Keith Gattis ==
Year	Single	Artist	Peak positions	Album
Year	Single	Artist	US Country Airplay	Album
2004	"El Cerrito Place"	Charlie Robison	—	Good Times
2009	"Reconsider"	Charlie Robison	—	Beautiful Day
2009	"Down Again"	Charlie Robison	—	Beautiful Day
2012	"El Cerrito Place"	Kenny Chesney	10	Welcome to the Fishbowl
2013	"When I See This Bar"	Kenny Chesney	14	Life on a Rock
2013	"I Got a Car"	George Strait	17	Love Is Everything
2015	"Let It Go"	George Strait	46	Cold Beer Conversation
2016	"Goin' Goin' Gone"	George Strait		Cold Beer Conversation
2019	"What Whiskey Does"	Randy Houser	31	Magnolia
"—" denotes releases that did not chart
