= London Express =

Studio album by Elan
- Released: 2005
- Genre: Alternative rock, blues rock
- Length: 55:52
- Label: Silverlight Records

Elan chronology
Street Child (2003)	London Express (2005)	What Can Be Done at This Point (2007)

Alternative cover
- Limited edition digipak cover

London Express is the second album by Mexican alternative rock vocalist, Elan. London Express finds its roots in the music of The Beatles, which Elan has described as "the only band that really changed everything". The first single off the album was the opener track, Be Free.

== Track listing ==
1. Be Free (5:07)
2. Whatever It Takes (3:54)
3. Don't Worry (3:04)
4. Devil in Me (5:16)
5. Like Me (3:31)
6. London Express (3:03)
7. This Fool's Life (3:39)
8. Nobody Knows (7:14)
9. Someday I Will Be (5:17)
10. The Big Time (3:34)
11. Glow (3:56)
12. Sweet Little You (3:05)
13. Get Your Blue (4:54)

== Singles ==
- "Be Free"
- "This Fool's Life"
- "Whatever It Takes"

=== Be Free ===
"Be Free" is the first single taken from the album London Express. It's also the opening song of that album.

==== Track listing ====
1. "Be Free" (radio edit)
2. "Be Free" (album version)
