= That's a Man =

"That's A Man"

Single by Jack Ingram

from the album Big Dreams & High Hopes
- Released: October 13, 2008
- Genre: Country
- Length: 3:57
- Label: Big Machine
- Songwriters: Steven Dale Jones; Ed Hill; Mark D. Sanders
- Producer: Jeremy Stover

Jack Ingram singles chronology
"Maybe She'll Get Lonely" (2007)	"That's A Man" (2008)	"Barefoot and Crazy" (2009)

"That's a Man" is a song written by Mark D. Sanders, Ed Hill, and Steven Dale Jones and recorded by American country music singer Jack Ingram. It was released in October 2008 as the first single to Ingram’s album Big Dreams & High Hopes. The song is Ingram's sixth Top 40 entry on the Billboard country charts.

== Content ==
"That's a Man" is a mid-tempo mostly accompanied by electric guitar and pedal steel guitar. In it, the narrator describes three different men, citing each as an example of men that are committed to their lives and peers. The first verse focuses on a nineteen-year-old who works two jobs to raise a family; the second tells of two Marines who become friends while in combat until one of them is killed; and an old farmer who is trying to maintain his family's farm is described in the third.

== Critical reception ==
Matt Bjorke of Roughstock gave the song a favorable review. He compared the song to Lee Roy Parnell's "roots-y country rock anthems about the common folks" such as 1993's "On the Road", adding " There’s a place on country radio for songs like “That’s A Man” and Ingram should be the man to take it." Jasper Jones of 411 Mania gave the song two-and-a-half out of five, saying that the song had a worthy concept but awkward lyrics.

== Chart performance ==
Chart (2008–2009)	Peak position
US Hot Country Songs (Billboard)	18
US Bubbling Under Hot 100 (Billboard)	4
