= Livin' or Dyin' =

Studio album by Jack Ingram
- Released: March 25, 1997
- Recorded: 1996
- Studios: Room & Board (Nashville, Tennessee)
- Genre: Country
- Length: 43:47
- Label: Rising Tide
- Producers: Steve Earle; Ray Kennedy

Jack Ingram chronology
Lonesome Questions (1995)	Livin' or Dyin' (1997)	Hey You (1999)

Singles from Livin' or Dyin'
- 1. "That's Not Me" Released: 1997; 2. "Flutter" Released: 1997

Professional ratings
Review scores
Source	Rating
AllMusic	4/5 stars
Entertainment Weekly	B

Livin' or Dyin' is the third studio album by country music artist Jack Ingram, released on March 25, 1997. It was the only album of his career released via Rising Tide Records due to that label closing soon after its release. The first two singles of Ingram's career were released from this album, "That's Not Me" and "Flutter". They both charted poorly with "Flutter" peaking at No. 51 while the other failed to chart altogether in the United States.

== Content ==
Livin' or Dyin' was produced by country artists Steve Earle and Ray Kennedy, credited on the album as the Twang Trust. Of the 14 songs on the album, 9 were written or co-written by Ingram. The last track, "Airways Motel" was written with Portland, Oregon based Alt-country artist Todd Snider, who also plays acoustic guitar on the track.

"Dallas" was originally recorded by Jimmie Dale Gilmore in 1989 on his self-titled album. "Rita Ballou" first appeared on Guy Clark's 1975 debut album, Old No. 1. "Imitation of love" was originally recorded by George Jones in 1966. Ingram had previously recorded a more stripped-down version of "Flutter" on his 1995 eponymous debut album. "Dim Lights, Thick Smoke" is a cover of Vern Gosdin from his 1985 album Time Stood Still.

== Track listing ==
No.	Title	Writer(s)	Length
1.	"Nothin' Wrong with That"	Jack Ingram, Tom Littlefield, Ty Tyler	2:32
2.	"Big Time"	Ingram, Littlefield	2:47
3.	"Ghost of a Man"	John Bunzow, Ingram	2:48
4.	"Flutter"	Colin Boyd	2:14
5.	"Rita Ballou"	Guy Clark	3:27
6.	"She Does Her Best"	Ingram Littlefield	2:42
7.	"Dim Lights, Thick Smoke (And Loud, Loud Music)"	Max Fidler, Joe Maphis, Rose Lee Maphis	4:02
8.	"Picture on My Wall"	Ingram	3:21
9.	"That's Not Me"	Ingram, Littlefield	3:09
10.	"Don't You Remember"	Ingram, Gary Nicholson	3:12
11.	"Imitation of Love"	Howard Gregory. Adrian Roland	2:41
12.	"Dallas"	Jimmie Dale Gilmore	3:45
13.	"I Can't Leave You"	Ingram	3:15
14.	"Airways Motel"	Ingram, Todd Snider	3:35

== Personnel ==
Taken from liner notes.

The Beat Up Ford Band

- Jack Ingram – lead vocals, backing vocals, acoustic guitar
- Chris Claridy – electric guitars, backing vocals
- Gus Salmon – bass guitar, 6 string trem bass, backing vocals
- Pete Coatney – drums, percussion

Other musicians

- Ray Kennedy – acoustic piano, Hammond organ, 6-string punk bass, tambourine
- Micheal Smotherman – Hammond organ
- Steve Earle – harmonium, acoustic guitar, high-string guitar, nylon acoustic guitar, acoustic archtop guitar, harmony vocals
- Todd Snider – acoustic guitar
- Jerry Jeff Walker – acoustic guitar, harmonica
- Tommy Hannum – steel guitar, dobro, tremolo steel guitar, lap steel guitar
- T-Money – needle drops, surface noise
- Tom Littlefield – backing vocals

Handclaps

- Mike Snider – lead clapper
- Michael Christ
- Rose Gillotti
- Amy Ingram
- Holland Nix
- Kathi Whitley

== Production ==
- Pat Earle – executive producer
- Steve Earle – producer
- Ray Kennedy – producer, recording, mixing
- Casey Jones – second engineer
- Hank Williams – mastering at MasterMix (Nashville, Tennessee)
- FCC Management – management

== Chart performance ==
=== Singles ===
Year	Single	Peak chart positions	
Year	Single	US Country	CAN Country
1997	"That's Not Me"	—	89
1997	"Flutter"	51	74
"—" denotes releases that did not chart
