= Jack Ingram =

American country music singer (born 1970)

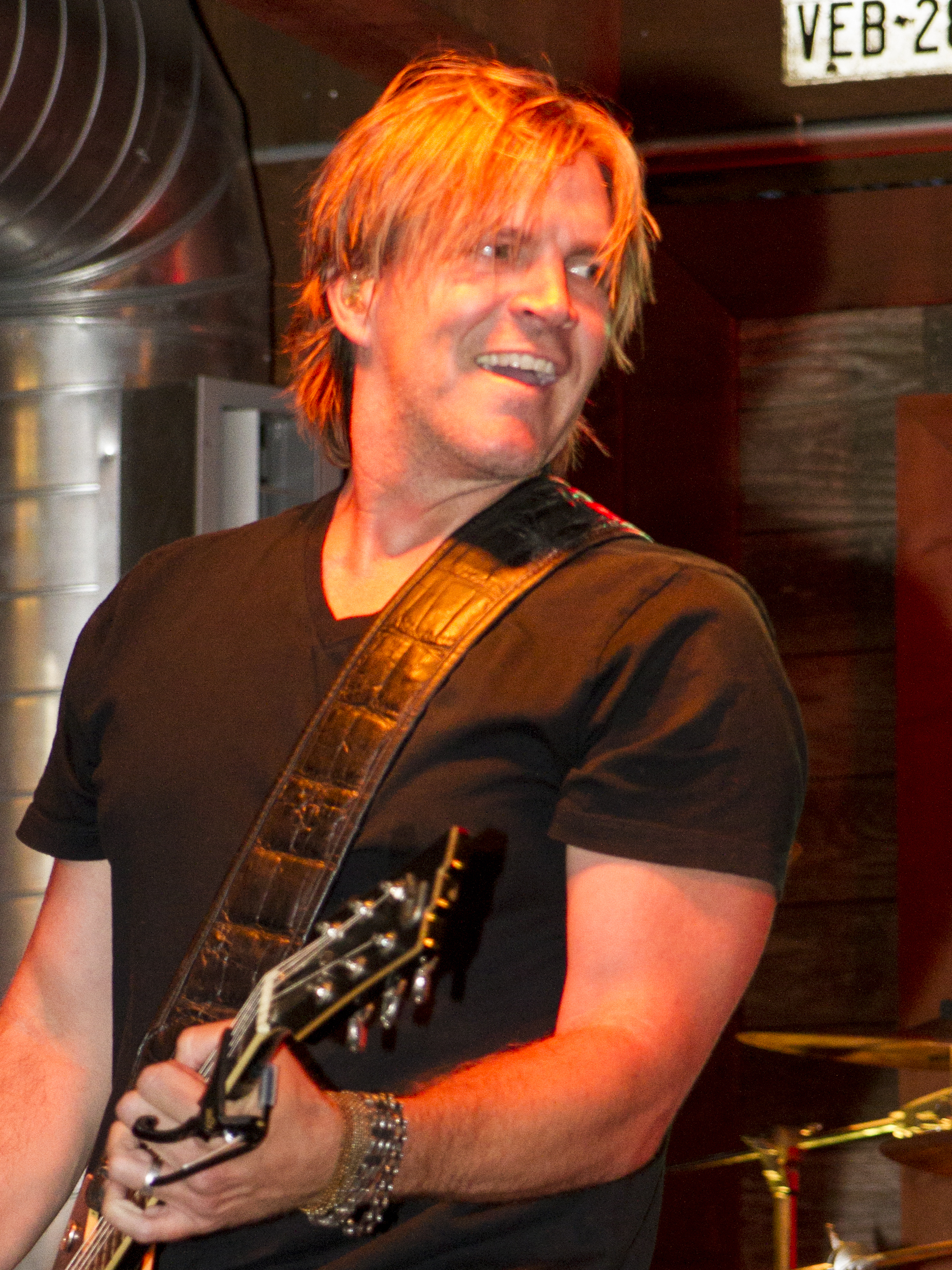
- Ingram performing in 2014

Background information
- Born: Jack Owen Ingram; November 15, 1970 (age 55)
- Origin: The Woodlands, Texas, U.S.
- Genres: Country
- Occupation: Singer-songwriter
- Instruments: Vocals; guitar
- Years active: 1992–present
- Labels: Rhythmic; Rising Tide; Lucky Dog; Columbia Nashville; Big Machine; Blaster
- Website: jackingramlive.com

Jack Owen Ingram (born November 15, 1970) is an American country music artist formerly signed to Big Machine Records, an independent record label. He has released eleven studio albums, one extended play, six live albums, and 19 singles. Although active since 1992, Ingram did not reach the U.S. Country Top 40 until the release of his single "Wherever You Are" late-2005. A number one hit on the Billboard country charts, that song was also his first release for Big Machine and that label's first Number One hit. Ingram has sent six other songs into the country Top 40 with "Love You", "Lips of an Angel" (a cover version of a song by Hinder), "Measure of a Man", "Maybe She'll Get Lonely", "That's a Man", and "Barefoot and Crazy".

== Biography ==
Ingram was born in Houston, Texas. He started writing songs and performing while studying psychology at Southern Methodist University in Dallas, where he was member of Alpha Tau Omega.

=== Musical career ===
Jack Ingram began his music career singing at a privately owned bar near the TCU campus of Fort Worth, Texas, which was owned by his friend John Clay Wolfe. Later, during the early 1990s, Jack toured the state of Texas opening for Mark Chesnutt and other acts. His first release was his self-titled album in 1995 via the Rhythmic label, followed by 1995's Lonesome Questions. Warner Bros. Records eventually signed him and released a live album entitled Live at Adair's, and re-issued his first two indie albums.

In 1997 he had his first time on the 22nd season of Austin City Limits. That same year, he released Livin' or Dyin' via Rising Tide Records, which produced his first chart single in the No. 51-peaking "Flutter". Two years later came Hey You via Lucky Dog, a division of Epic Records, which accounted for a No. 64 country single in "How Many Days". In 2000, he collaborated with Charlie Robison and Bruce Robison for the live album Unleashed Live.

Electric, his second album for Lucky Dog, was also his first album to enter Top Country Albums, despite not producing a chart single. This album was supplemented a year later by an EP entitled Electric: Extra Volts before he left Lucky Dog. Two more live albums followed before he signed to Columbia Nashville for the release of Young Man in 2004, which accounted for no singles. Another live album, Acoustic Motel, was issued in 2005.

On Sunday, February 3, 2013, H-E-B premiered their 'Texas Myths' Super Bowl commercial featuring Jack Ingram.

=== 2005–2011: Big Machine Records ===
In 2005, Ingram signed to the independent record label Big Machine Records. Under the Big Machine banner, Ingram released a predominantly live album entitled Live: Wherever You Are. His first single release on that record label, "Wherever You Are", became Ingram's first top 40, and later his first and only Number One single on the U.S. Billboard Hot Country Songs charts, as well as the first Number One for the Big Machine label. "Love You", the only other studio track on Live: Wherever You Are, was also released as a single, peaking at No. 12 on the charts. This song was also recorded by Trent Summar & the New Row Mob (whose frontman, Trent Summar, co-wrote it) on their 2005 album Horseshoes & Hand Grenades.

In late 2006, Ingram released a cover of Hinder's song "Lips of an Angel". Ingram's cover peaked at No. 16 on the country charts "Lips of an Angel" was the lead-off single to This Is It, his second album for Big Machine. This album also produced the No. 18 "Measure of a Man" (a Radney Foster co-write) and the No. 24 "Maybe She'll Get Lonely".

In 2008, Ingram appeared at the Argyle Education Foundation Black Diamond Affair.

He won the Academy of Country Music award for top new male vocalist on May 19, 2008. Ingram also filled in for radio host Bob Kingsley on the countdown show "Bob Kingsley's Country Top 40" for the week of September 20–21, 2008.

According to CMT, Ingram's Big Dreams & High Hopes album has "more guts" and Ellis Paul's "The World Ain't Slowing Down" may be the song that takes Ingram to the "next level". Ingram says "It'll be fun for me to expose people to a fantastic song from an artist who's had a 20-year career of being a very successful folk artist." The song was cut from the album. Its lead-off single "That's a Man" charted in the Top 20, followed by "Barefoot and Crazy," which became his second Top 10 hit. The album's next three singles all failed to enter the Top 40: "Seeing Stars" (a duet with Patty Griffin), "Free" and a re-recording of "Barbie Doll" with guest vocals from Dierks Bentley.

On August 26, 2009, Ingram set a Guinness record for the most radio interviews in one day, when he was interviewed 215 times.

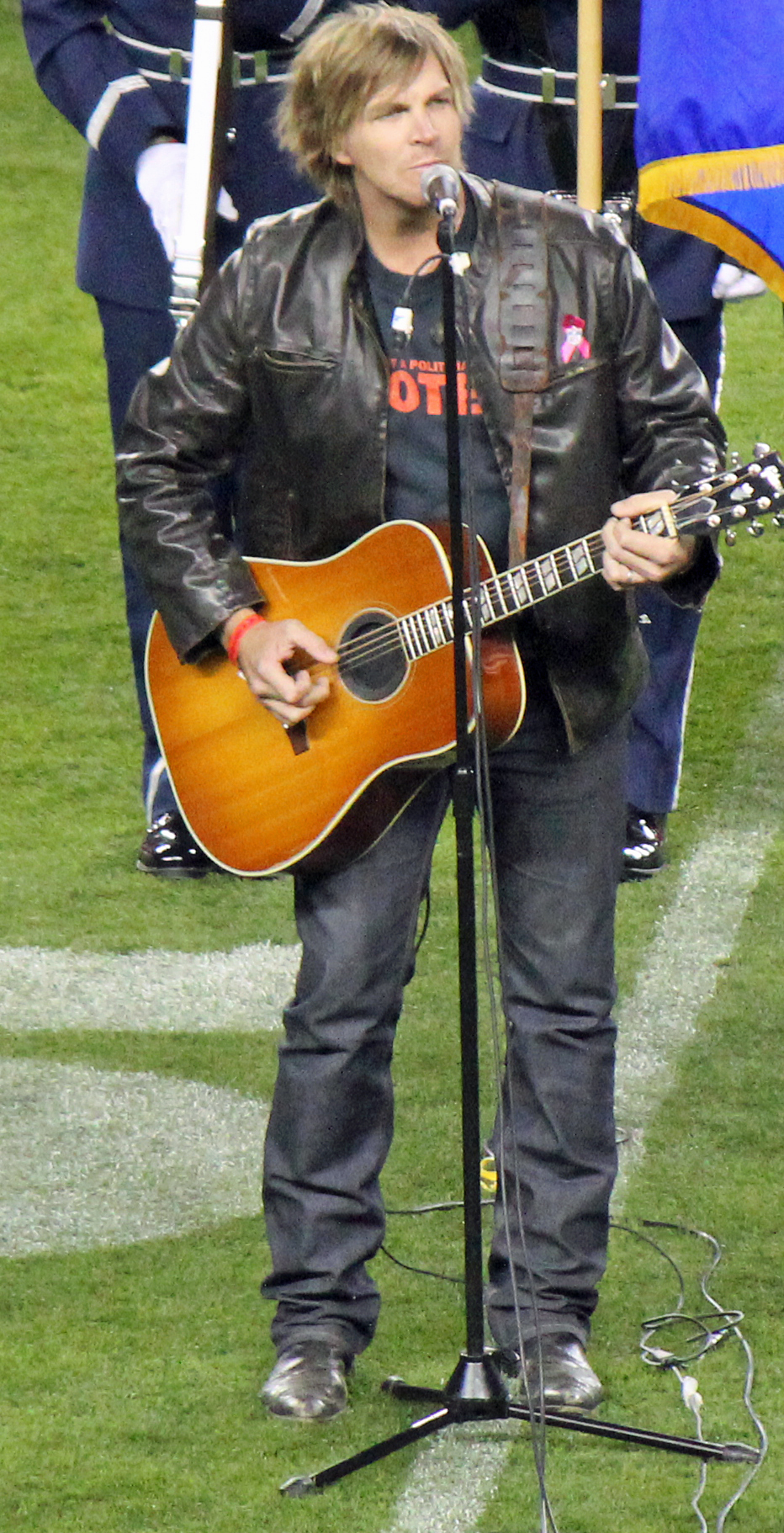
Singing the National Anthem in Denver at Sports Authority Field at Mile High on October 28, 2012.

Ingram and Big Machine amicably parted ways in late 2011.

As a sideline, Ingram does voice imaging for a number of country stations, including KRYS-FM Corpus Christi; WSIX-FM Nashville; WMIL-FM Milwaukee; KWJJ-FM Portland, Ore.; and KSCS Dallas.

=== Fundraising ===
In 2013, Jack teamed up with actor Matthew McConaughey and University of Texas at Austin football coach Mack Brown to create a fundraiser for their favorite children's charities. Dubbed Mack, Jack & McConaughey, the affair was held April 11–12 at Austin's ACL Live at the Moody Theater and featured a gala, golf tournament, fashion show and two nights of music. Mack, Jack & McConaughey returned in 2014.

== Discography ==
=== Studio albums ===
Title	Album details	Peak chart positions		
Title	Album details	US Country	US	US Heat
Jack Ingram	Release date: September 30, 1995; Label: Crystal Clear Records	—	—	—
Lonesome Questions	Release date: December 12, 1995; Label: Crystal Clear Records	—	—	—
Livin' or Dyin'	Release date: March 25, 1997; Label: Rising Tide Records	—	—	—
Hey You	Release date: September 21, 1999; Label: Lucky Dog Records	—	—	—
Electric	Release date: June 4, 2002; Label: Lucky Dog Records	34	—	23
Young Man	Release date: March 9, 2004; Label: Columbia Nashville	—	—	—
This Is It	Release date: March 27, 2007; Label: Big Machine Records	4	34	—
Big Dreams & High Hopes	Release date: August 25, 2009; Label: Big Machine Records	21	61	—
Midnight Motel	Release date: August 26, 2016; Label: Rounder Records	24	—	—
Ridin' High...Again	Release date: April 26, 2019; Label: Beat Up Ford Records	—	—	—
The Marfa Tapes (with Miranda Lambert and Jon Randall)	Release date: May 7, 2021; Label: RCA Nashville	7	51	—
"—" denotes releases that did not chart

=== EPs ===
Title	Album details
Electric: Extra Volts	Release date: March 11, 2003; Label: Sony BMG

=== Live albums ===
Title	Album details	Peak chart positions	
Title	Album details	US Country	US Heat
Live at Adair's	Release date: November 21, 1995; Label: Crystal Clear Records	—	—
Unleashed Live (with Bruce Robison and Charlie Robison)	Release date: September 26, 2000; Label: Lucky Dog Records	—	—
Live at Billy Bob's Texas	Release date: October 14, 2003; Label: Smith Music Group	—	—
Live at Gruene Hall: Happy Happy	Release date: December 14, 2004; Label: RAM	—	—
Acoustic Motel	Release date: March 22, 2005; Label: RAM	—	—
Live: Wherever You Are	Release date: January 10, 2006; Label: Big Machine Records	33	9
"—" denotes releases that did not chart

=== Singles ===
Year	Single	Peak chart positions			Album
Year	Single	US Country	US	CAN Country	Album
1997	"That's Not Me"	—	—	89	Livin' or Dyin'
1997	"Flutter"	51	—	74	Livin' or Dyin'
1999	"How Many Days"	64	—	—	Hey You
1999	"Mustang Burn"	—	—	—	Hey You
2000	"Work This Out"	—	—	—	Hey You
2000	"Barbie Doll"	—	—	—	Hey You
2002	"One Thing"	—	—	—	Electric
2003	"A Little Bit"	—	—	—	Live at Billy Bob's Texas
2003	"Keep on Keepin' On"	—	—	—	Live at Billy Bob's Texas
2005	"Wherever You Are"	1	63	11	Live: Wherever You Are
2006	"Love You"	12	87	21	Live: Wherever You Are
2006	"Lips of an Angel"	16	77	19	This Is It
2007	"Measure of a Man"	18	108	32	This Is It
2007	"Maybe She'll Get Lonely"	24	—	—	This Is It
2008	"That's a Man"	18	104	35	Big Dreams & High Hopes
2009	"Barefoot and Crazy"	10	64	14	Big Dreams & High Hopes
2009	"Seeing Stars" (with Patty Griffin)	54	—	—	Big Dreams & High Hopes
2010	"Free"	42	—	—	Big Dreams & High Hopes
2010	"Barbie Doll" (re-recording)	56	—	—	Big Dreams & High Hopes
"—" denotes releases that did not chart

=== Music videos ===
Year	Video	Director
1997	"That's Not Me"	Michael McNamara
1997	"Flutter"	Jim Hershleder
1999	"How Many Days"	Trey Fanjoy
1999	"Mustang Burn"	Richard Bennett
2000	"Barbie Doll"	Flick Wiltshire
2002	"One Thing"	Trey Fanjoy
2006	"Wherever You Are"	David McClister
2006	"Love You"	Shaun Silva
2007	"Lips of an Angel"	Shaun Silva
2007	"Measure of a Man"	Shaun Silva
2008	"Maybe She'll Get Lonely"	Gibbs/Greilech
2008	"That's a Man"	Brian Lazzaro
2009	"Barefoot and Crazy"	Stephen Shepherd
2016	"I'm Drinking Through It"	Michael Tully

== Awards and nominations ==
Year	Association	Category	Result
2007	CMT Music Awards	Wide Open Country Video of the Year	Won
2008	Academy of Country Music	Top New Male Vocalist	Won
2008	CMT Music Awards	Wide Open Country Video of the Year	Nominated
2017	CMA Awards	Song of the Year – "Tin Man" (with Miranda Lambert and Jon Randall)	Nominated
2018	Grammy Awards	Best Country Song – "Tin Man" (with Miranda Lambert and Jon Randall)	Nominated
2018	Academy of Country Music	Song of the Year – "Tin Man" (with Miranda Lambert and Jon Randall)	Won
