= Trent Summar & the New Row Mob =

Trent Summar & The New Row Mob
- Origin: Tennessee, United States
- Genres: Country
- Years active: 2000–present
- Labels: VFR, Palo Duro
- Members: Trent Summar; Dave Kennedy; Dan Baird; Michael "Supe" Granada; Ken McMahan
- Past members: Jerry Dale McFadden; Jared Reynolds; Kenny Vaughan; Philip Wallace
- Website: http://www.trentsummarmusic.com

Trent Summar & The New Row Mob is an American country music group from the state of Tennessee. Its membership comprises Trent Summar (lead vocals), Ken McMahan (guitar), Dan Baird (guitar), Dave Kennedy (drums), and Michael "Supe" Granda (bass guitar, vocals). Granda is a founding member of Ozark Mountain Daredevils, Baird is a former member of the Southern rock band The Georgia Satellites, and Summar previously fronted a band called Hank Flamingo. To date, Trent Summar & The New Row Mob have recorded two studio albums and a live compilation, in addition to charting one single on the Billboard Hot Country Songs charts.

== Biography ==
Trent Summar & The New Row Mob was founded in 2000. The band's original lineup consisted of Trent Summar (lead vocals), Kenny Vaughan (guitar), Philip Wallace (guitar), Jared Reynolds (bass guitar, vocals), Dave Kennedy (drums), and Jerry Dale McFadden (piano). Both Summar and Wallace had formerly been in a sextet called Hank Flamingo, which recorded an album for Giant Records in 1994, and Vaughn had previously been a member of McBride & the Ride. Trent Summar's unique voice merges elements of traditional country with rock & roll, honky tonk, and contemporary country music.

Under the original lineup, Trent Summar & The New Row Mob released its self-titled debut album on VFR Records in 2000. This album contained their debut single "It Never Rains in Southern California", a cover of Albert Hammond's hit single from 1972. An independently released live album was issued three years later, followed by Horseshoes & Hand Grenades in 2006.

In addition to his contributions as a member of The New Row Mob, frontman Trent Summar has composed songs for other country music artists, including album tracks by Billy Currington and Gary Allan, as well as "Love You", a 2006 single for Jack Ingram, and "There's the Sun", a 2013 single for Kix Brooks. He also co-wrote David Nail's "Kiss You Tonight" (2014).

== Discography ==
=== Albums ===
Title	Album details
Trent Summar & The New Row Mob	Release date: August 22, 2000; Label: VFR Records
Live at 12th and Porter	Release date: March 25, 2003; Label: DCN Records
Horseshoes & Hand Grenades	Release date: October 10, 2006; Label: Palo Duro Records

=== Singles ===
Year	Single	Peak positions	Album
Year	Single	US Country	Album
2000	"New Money"	—	Trent Summar & The New Row Mob
2000	"It Never Rains in Southern California"	74	Trent Summar & The New Row Mob
2001	"Paint Your Name in Purple"	—	Trent Summar & The New Row Mob
2006	"Horseshoes & Hand Grenades"	—	Horseshoes & Hand Grenades
2007	"Never Really Loved Her Anyway"	—	Horseshoes & Hand Grenades
"—" denotes releases that did not chart

=== Music videos ===
Year	Video	Director
2000	"New Money"	David McClister
2000	"It Never Rains in Southern California"	Trent Hardville
2001	"Paint Your Name in Purple"	David McClister
2002	"I'm Country"	
2007	"Never Really Loved Her Anyway"	Cole Douglas
