= Charlie Robison =

American singer-songwriter (1964–2023)

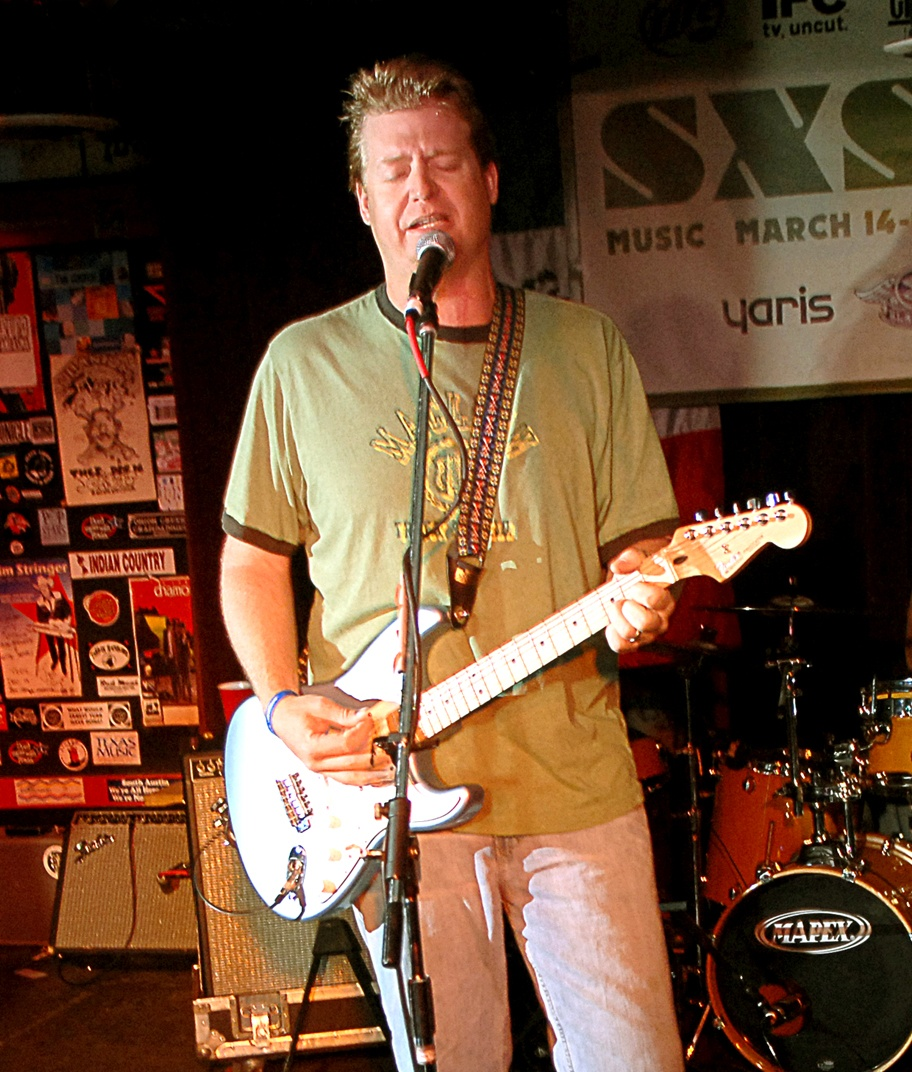
- Robison performing in 2007

Background information
- Born: Charles Fitzgerald Robison; September 1, 1964; Houston, Texas, U.S.
- Origin: Bandera, Texas, U.S.
- Died: September 10, 2023 (aged 59) San Antonio, Texas, U.S.
- Genre: Country
- Occupation: Singer-songwriter
- Years active: 1984–2018; 2022–2023
- Labels: Viero; Lucky Dog; Columbia; Dualtone
- Spouse: Emily Erwin (m. 1999; div. 2008)
- Website: charlierobison.com

Charles Fitzgerald Robison (September 1, 1964 – September 10, 2023) was an American country music singer-songwriter.

== Career ==
After a knee injury at Southwest Texas State University ended a potential football career, Charlie Robison went to Austin, Texas, in the late 1980s and had stints in the bands Chaparral, Millionaire Playboys, and Two Hoots and a Holler. He went solo with his album "Bandera" in 1996. He subsequently signed with Sony and released "Life of the Party" on Sony's subsidiary Lucky Dog Records. The album gave him three of his biggest hits including "My Hometown." His next release was a live disc called "Unleashed Live," which is credited to Charlie, brother Bruce, and Jack Ingram. He then signed with Columbia Records for "Step Right Up" and another live album.

In 2003, Robison was a judge on the first season of the TV singing competition Nashville Star.

Unhappy with the expectations and limitations of being a Nashville country artist, he moved to a smaller independent label, Dualtone, for Good Times in 2004, followed by extensive touring and newfound control over his career. Accordingly, his sound began to evolve away from mainstream/Nashville country toward more Southern and hard rock influences.

Five years after the release of "Good Times," Robison released Beautiful Day on June 23, 2009, on Dualtone. This was the first album he self-produced. Both albums featured several songs written by Nashville singer-songwriter Keith Gattis.

His song "Good Times" was featured in the credits of HBO's original series True Blood in the first season's third episode.

In 2009, he embarked on an East Coast tour with stops in Little Rock, Nashville, Atlanta, Raleigh, New York City, Philadelphia, Chicago, Minneapolis, Iowa City, and Memphis to promote Beautiful Day. After that, he played primarily in Texas, with occasional shows in Louisiana, Arkansas, Oklahoma, and Colorado.

Robison was known for playing classic rock covers during his live shows.

His live band included Mark Tokach (lead guitar), Abe Combest (drums), Zeke Benenate (bass) J.C. Burt (steel guitar) and Chris Valdez (road manager and additional guitar). Prior to Beautiful Day, his band was known as The Enablers, and included Keith Robinson (drums), Scott Esbeck (bass) and Travis Woodard (drums). Other notable members have included Kim Deschamps (pedal & lap steel, mandolin and guitar from 2000–2009), Kevin Carroll (guitar), Jason Bryl (bass), Chris Grady (bass), Louis Landry (keyboards and accordion), and Kris Brown (bass). His recordings have also featured special guests Lloyd Maines (who produced "Step Right Up" and "Good Times"), Rich Brotherton, Charlie Sexton, and Natalie Maines (duet on "The Wedding Song" and harmony vocals on "El Cerrito Place").

In September 2014, Robison opened Alamo Icehouse in San Antonio, Texas, with former Major League Baseball player Brooks Kieschnick.

On September 24, 2018, Robison announced that due to complications from surgery, he was permanently unable to sing, and that he was officially retiring from stage and studio. Robison resumed his music career in 2022. He returned to Billy Bob's as part of his first tour since 2018, playing at the same venue where he first played in 1999.

== Personal life and death ==
Robison's brother, Bruce Robison, and his sister, Robyn Ludwick, are also singer-songwriters.

Robison married Emily Erwin of the Dixie Chicks at the Cibolo Creek Ranch in May 1999, with whom he had three children. The couple divorced in August 2008. He and his second wife had a son in February 2020.

Robison died after suffering from cardiac arrest and other complications at a San Antonio, Texas, hospital on September 10, 2023, at the age of 59.

== Discography ==
=== Albums ===
| Title | Album details | Peak chart positions | |
| Title | Album details | US Country | US Heat |
|---|---|---|---|
| Bandera | Release date: August 6, 1996; Label: Viero Records | — | — |
| Life of the Party | Release date: September 8, 1998; Label: Lucky Dog | 71 | — |
| Unleashed Live (with Jack Ingram and Bruce Robison) | Release date: September 26, 2000; Label: Lucky Dog | — | — |
| Step Right Up | Release date: April 10, 2001; Label: Columbia Records | 27 | 23 |
| Live | Release date: May 6, 2003; Label: Columbia Records | 51 | — |
| Good Times | Release date: September 21, 2004; Label: Dualtone Records | 52 | — |
| Beautiful Day | Release date: June 23, 2009; Label: Dualtone Records | 33 | 25 |
| Live at Billy Bob's Texas | Release date: June 4, 2013; Label: Smith Music Group | 63 | 33 |
| High Life | Release date: October 1, 2013; Label: Jetwell Records | 48 | 25 |
"—" denotes releases that did not chart

=== Singles ===
| Year | Single | Peak positions | Album |
| Year | Single | US Country | Album |
|---|---|---|---|
| 1999 | "Barlight" | 60 | Life of the Party |
| 2000 | "My Hometown" | 65 | Life of the Party |
| 2000 | "Poor Man's Son" | 67 | Life of the Party |
| 2001 | "I Want You Bad" | 35 | Step Right Up |
| 2001 | "Right Man for the Job" | — | Step Right Up |
| 2003 | "Walter" | 58 | Live |
| 2004 | "El Cerrito Place" | — | Good Times |
| 2005 | "Photograph" | — | Good Times |
| 2006 | "Wild Man from Borneo" | — | Why the Hell Not: The Songs of Kinky Friedman |
| 2009 | "Reconsider" | — | Beautiful Day |
| 2009 | "Down Again" | — | Beautiful Day |
| 2010 | "Feelin' Good" | — | Beautiful Day |
"—" denotes releases that did not chart

=== Music videos ===
| Year | Video | Director |
|---|---|---|
| 1998 | "Barlight" | Adrian Pasdar |
| 1999 | "My Hometown" | Adrian Pasdar |
| 2000 | "Poor Man's Son" | Adam Little |
| 2001 | "I Want You Bad" | Trey Fanjoy |
| 2001 | "Right Man for the Job" | Trey Fanjoy |
| 2004 | "El Cerrito Place" | Adrian Pasdar |
| 2005 | "Photograph" | Adrian Pasdar |

== Tributes ==
He appeared on Kindred Spirits: A tribute to Johnny Cash, singing "Don't Take Your Guns to Town".

In 2006, Charlie Robison performed "Wildman from Borneo" on the Kinky Friedman tribute "Why the hell not..." The songs of Kinky Friedman.

== See also ==
- Music of Austin
