= Wherever You Are (Jack Ingram song) =

Single by Jack Ingram

from the album Live: Wherever You Are
- Released: November 1, 2005
- Recorded: 2005
- Genre: Country
- Length: 3:37
- Label: Big Machine
- Songwriters: Steve Bogard, Jeremy Stover
- Producer: Jeremy Stover

Jack Ingram singles chronology
"Keep On Keepin' On" (2003)	"Wherever You Are" (2005)	"Love You" (2006)

"Wherever You Are" is a song recorded by American country music artist Jack Ingram. It was Ingram's first Top 40 single on the U.S. Billboard Hot Country Songs charts. It was released in November 2005 as the lead-off single to Ingram's first album for Big Machine Records, Live: Wherever You Are.

== Background ==
"Wherever You Are" was originally slated to be recorded by Canadian country music artist Deric Ruttan, as well as the band Rushlow. In 2005, Scott Borchetta, who had just founded the Big Machine label, discovered the song, and recommended it to Ingram, one of the acts signed to his label. Ingram recorded it as one of two studio tracks for his otherwise-live album Live: Wherever You Are, from which it was released as a single in late 2005.

The song was Ingram's ninth release and first Top 40 chart entry. It was the first Number One country single for Big Machine Records and co-writer Jeremy Stover, who wrote the song with Steve Bogard.

== Music video ==
The music video was directed by David McClister and premiered on January 5, 2006. It features Jack performing in different locations including a desert, a garage, and in a room with purple lights.

== Chart positions ==
Chart (2005–2006)	Peak position
US Hot Country Songs (Billboard)	1
US Billboard Hot 100	63

=== Year-end charts ===
Chart (2006)	Position
US Country Songs (Billboard)	25
