= 2007 in country music =

This is a list of notable events in country music that took place in the year 2007.

== Events ==
- January 12 – Wilma Lee Cooper Celebrates her 50th Grand Ole Opry Anniversary.
- February 11 – It was a big night for country music artists at the 49th Annual Grammy Awards in Los Angeles, as they swept the awards in four top categories. The Dixie Chicks won three of those awards: Record of the Year and Song of the Year (both for "Not Ready to Make Nice," the latter shared with songwriter Dan Wilson) and Album of the Year (Taking the Long Way). Carrie Underwood took the Best New Artist Award. Both Underwood and the Dixie Chicks were winners in country-specific categories. The Dixie Chicks won for Best Country Performance By A Duo Or Group With Vocal (for "Not Ready to Make Nice") and Best Country Album ("Taking the Long Way"). Underwood won for Best Female Country Vocal Performance for "Jesus, Take the Wheel"; the song also earned a Best Country Song award for songwriters Brett James, Hillary Lindsey and Gordie Sampson. Also, country music pioneer Bob Wills – the longtime leader of the Texas Playboys – was a posthumous recipient of a Lifetime Achievement Award. Wills was recognized 32 years after his death.
- Week of February 12 – Country music stars team with celebrities during a special celebrity week of Wheel of Fortune, which was taped in Charleston, South Carolina. During the game aired February 13, Julie Roberts and contestant partner Peter Buccellato won $124,250 after Buccallato solved the bonus round puzzle for the show's grand prize of $100,000. Roberts donated a matching amount to St. Jude's Children's Research Hospital.
- February 17 – Hank Williams Jr. filed for divorce from his fourth wife, Mary Jane, whom he married in 1990.
- February 23 – Porter Wogoner Celebrates his 50th Grand Ole Opry anniversary.
- March 19 – Days after an announcement that Lonestar had parted ways with longtime record label BNA Records, lead singer Richie McDonald announces plans to depart the group at the end of the year, in search of a solo career.
- March 19 – Professional dancer and country music star-to-be Julianne Hough made her debut on Dancing with the Stars, a televised dance promotion. Teamed with Olympic gold medal-winning speed skater Apolo Anton Ohno, Hough would go on to win the championship for Season 4. Hough would return in the fall to win a second title, this time with two-time Indianapolis 500 champion Hélio Castroneves.
- April 10 – The former home of Johnny Cash and June Carter Cash is destroyed by fire.
- April – Mary Chapin Carpenter is hospitalized for a pulmonary embolism, causing her to cancel all tours for the rest of the year.
- May 3 – Kellie Pickler and Aaron Tippin in a country music at Carolina.
- May 10 – Country music superstar Trisha Yearwood announces she is leaving MCA Records where she had been for 16 years with over 12 million albums sold and 5 number 1 singles. She announced she was signing with Big Machine Records. Yearwood and Big Machine CEO Scott Borchetta met in her intern days at MTM records. Trisha's last top 10 hit with MCA was "I Would've Loved You Anyway" in 2001.
- July 21 – Trace Adkins quest Kellie Pickler, Jo Dee Messina and Pat Green at the Grand Ole Opry Live.
- September 4 – Sammy Kershaw enters the Louisiana lieutenant governor's race, running as a Republican.
- September 15 – Garth Brooks song, "More Than a Memory" becomes the first song to debut at No. 1 on the Billboard magazine Hot Country Songs chart, since the start of the magazine's all-encompassing country chart in 1958.
- October 21 – Country music legend Porter Wagoner's publicist Darlene Bieber confirms that Wagoner had been diagnosed with lung cancer. Wagoner dies seven days later.
- October 30 – The Eagles release their studio album Long Road Out of Eden, their first compilation of all-new material in 28 years. The album sells over a million copies in its first two weeks.
- November 7 – Taylor Swift quest Brad Paisley and Kellie Pickler at the 2007 CMA Awards.

== Top hits of the year ==
The following songs placed within the Top 20 on the Hot Country Songs or Canada Country charts in 2007:

US	CAN	Single	Artist	Reference
5	21	All My Friends Say	Luke Bryan	
5	4	Alyssa Lies	Jason Michael Carroll	
4	29	Amarillo Sky	Jason Aldean	
17	38	Another Side of You	Joe Nichols	
5	9	Anyway	Martina McBride	
11	18	As If	Sara Evans	
2	1	Because of You	Reba McEntire duet with Kelly Clarkson	
1	1	Beer in Mexico	Kenny Chesney	
6	39	A Different World	Bucky Covington	
30	13	Dirty Girl	Terri Clark	
1	1	Don't Blink	Kenny Chesney	
12	34	Don't Make Me	Blake Shelton	
9	19	Everyday America	Sugarland	
5	19	Fall	Clay Walker	
14	32	Famous in a Small Town	Miranda Lambert	
12	15	A Feelin' Like That	Gary Allan	
1	6	Find Out Who Your Friends Are	Tracy Lawrence	
2	8	Firecracker	Josh Turner	
1	2	Free and Easy (Down the Road I Go)	Dierks Bentley	
18	48	Good as Gone	Little Big Town	
1	5	Good Directions	Billy Currington	
17	39	Guys Like Me	Eric Church	
19	31	Heaven, Heartache, and the Power of Love	Trisha Yearwood	
3	1	High Maintenance Woman	Toby Keith	
16	20	Hillbilly Deluxe	Brooks & Dunn	
3	3	How 'bout Them Cowgirls	George Strait	
15	28	How I Feel	Martina McBride	
18	—	I Just Came Back from a War	Darryl Worley	
8	4	I Need You	Tim McGraw with Faith Hill	
2	1	I Told You So	Keith Urban	
14	—	I Wonder	Kellie Pickler	
7	17	I'll Wait for You	Joe Nichols	
3	12	If You're Reading This	Tim McGraw	
1	1	It Just Comes Natural	George Strait	
6	25	Johnny Cash	Jason Aldean	
1	14	Ladies Love Country Boys	Trace Adkins	
1	1	Last Dollar (Fly Away)	Tim McGraw	
16	19	Lips of an Angel	Jack Ingram	
7	17	Little Bit of Life	Craig Morgan	
20	—	A Little More You	Little Big Town	
6	26	Livin' Our Love Song	Jason Michael Carroll	
10	10	Long Trip Alone	Dierks Bentley	
—	5	The Long Way Around	Dixie Chicks	
1	2	Lost in This Moment	Big & Rich	
1	14	Love Me If You Can	Toby Keith	
1	10	Lucky Man	Montgomery Gentry	
16	38	Me and God	Josh Turner	
18	32	Measure of a Man	Jack Ingram	
1	4	Moments	Emerson Drive	
19	48	The More I Drink	Blake Shelton	
1	1	More Than a Memory	Garth Brooks	
9	6	My, Oh My	The Wreckers	
1	1	Never Wanted Nothing More	Kenny Chesney	
14	25	Nothin' Better to Do	LeAnn Rimes	
11	42	One Wing in the Fire	Trent Tomlinson	
1	1	Online	Brad Paisley	
1	1	Our Song	Taylor Swift	
4	1	Proud of the House We Built	Brooks & Dunn	
15	31	Red High Heels	Kellie Pickler	
1	1	Settlin'	Sugarland	
1	1	She's Everything	Brad Paisley	
1	3	So Small	Carrie Underwood	
1	3	Stand	Rascal Flatts	
6	28	Startin' with Me	Jake Owen	
3	1	Stupid Boy	Keith Urban	
1	3	Take Me There	Rascal Flatts	
2	6	Teardrops on My Guitar	Taylor Swift	
1	11	These Are My People	Rodney Atkins	
1	1	Ticks	Brad Paisley	
6	10	Tim McGraw	Taylor Swift	
11	—	Tough	Craig Morgan	
1	1	Wasted	Carrie Underwood	
1	3	Watching You	Rodney Atkins	
20	—	The Woman in My Life	Phil Vassar	
5	11	A Woman's Love	Alan Jackson	
2	1	Wrapped	George Strait	
13	30	You'll Always Be My Baby	Sara Evans	

== Top new album releases ==
The following albums placed within the Top 50 on the Top Country Albums charts in 2007:

US	Album	Artist	Record label
1	5th Gear	Brad Paisley	Arista Nashville
4	22 More Hits	George Strait	MCA Nashville
3	American Man: Greatest Hits Volume II	Trace Adkins	Capitol Nashville
1	Between Raising Hell and Amazing Grace	Big & Rich	Warner Bros. Nashville
1	Big Dog Daddy	Toby Keith	Show Dog Nashville
1	Bucky Covington	Bucky Covington	Lyric Street
10	The Calling	Mary Chapin Carpenter	Zoë
1	Carnival Ride	Carrie Underwood	Arista Nashville
8	A Classic Christmas	Toby Keith	Show Dog Nashville
4	Cowboy Town	Brooks & Dunn	Arista Nashville
1	Crazy Ex-Girlfriend	Miranda Lambert	Columbia Nashville
3	Everything Is Fine	Josh Turner	MCA Nashville
5	Fall	Clay Walker	Asylum-Curb
2	Family	LeAnn Rimes	Asylum-Curb
6	For the Love	Tracy Lawrence	Rocky Comfort/CO5
1	Greatest Hits	Gary Allan	MCA Nashville
3	Greatest Hits	Sara Evans	RCA Nashville
2	Greatest Hits	Trisha Yearwood	MCA Nashville
4	Greatest Hits: 18 Kids	Keith Urban	Capitol Nashville
10	Heaven, Heartache, and the Power of Love	Trisha Yearwood	Big Machine
3	The Hits	Faith Hill	Warner Bros. Nashville
3	Home At Last	Billy Ray Cyrus	Walt Disney Records
3	A Hundred Miles or More: A Collection	Alison Krauss	Rounder
2	I'll Stay Me	Luke Bryan	Capitol Nashville
2	It's Not Big It's Large	Lyle Lovett	Lost Highway
1	Just Who I Am: Poets & Pirates	Kenny Chesney	BNA
7	Last of the Breed	Willie Nelson, Merle Haggard & Ray Price	Lost Highway
1	Let It Go	Tim McGraw	Curb
4	Live at Texas Stadium	Alan Jackson, George Strait & Jimmy Buffett	MCA Nashville
3	Living Hard	Gary Allan	MCA Nashville
1	Long Road Out of Eden	Eagles	ERC/Lost Highway
6	Mission California	Cross Canadian Ragweed	Universal South
5	Morning Constitutions	Larry the Cable Guy	Warner Bros. Nashville
10	My Kind of Country	Van Zant	Columbia Nashville
1	One of the Boys	Gretchen Wilson	Columbia Nashville
10	A Place to Land	Little Big Town	Equity
2	Pure BS	Blake Shelton	Warner Bros. Nashville
2	Raising Sand	Alison Krauss & Robert Plant	Rounder
2	Real Things	Joe Nichols	Universal South
1	Reba: Duets	Reba McEntire	MCA Nashville
1	Relentless	Jason Aldean	Broken Bow
3	Songs of Inspiration II	Alabama	RCA Nashville
1	Still Feels Good	Rascal Flatts	Lyric Street
3	The Storm	Travis Tritt	Category 5
4	This Is It	Jack Ingram	Big Machine
1	Totally Country Vol. 6	Various Artists	Sony BMG
1	The Ultimate Hits	Garth Brooks	Pearl
1	Waitin' in the Country	Jason Michael Carroll	Arista Nashville
2	Waking Up Laughing	Martina McBride	RCA Nashville
10	Washington Square Serenade	Steve Earle	New West

=== Other top albums ===
US	Album	Artist	Record label
16	15° Off Cool	Bill Engvall	Jack
40	16 Biggest Hits	Alabama	RCA Nashville
22	16 Biggest Hits	Alan Jackson	Arista Nashville
32	16 Biggest Hits	Dolly Parton	RCA Nashville
45	20th Century Masters – The Millennium Collection: The Best of Reba McEntire	Reba McEntire	MCA Nashville
43	After Hours	Raul Malo	Sanctuary
30	Beverley Mitchell	Beverley Mitchell	Daywind
31	Big Love in a Small Town	Sarah Johns	BNA
48	Big Sky	The Isaacs	Gaither
28	Black in the Saddle	Cowboy Troy	RAYBAW
47	A Blue Collar Christmas	Slidawg and the Redneck Ramblers	Madacy
43	The Bluegrass Sessions	Merle Haggard	McCoury
47	Boogity, Boogity: A Tribute to the Comedic Genius of Ray Stevens	Cledus T. Judd	Curb
14	Bring It On	Kevin Fowler	Equity
34	Cash: Ultimate Gospel	Johnny Cash	Columbia Records
12	Christmastime in Larryland	Larry the Cable Guy	Jack/Warner Bros.
42	Cole Deggs & the Lonesome	Cole Deggs & the Lonesome	Columbia Records
50	Country's Got More Heart	Various Artists	Sony BMG
11	Dwight Sings Buck	Dwight Yoakam	New West
36	Easy Money	John Anderson	RAYBAW
49	Flynnville Train	Flynnville Train	Show Dog
14	Halfway to Hazard	Halfway to Hazard	Mercury Nashville
18	Hear Something Country: Christmas	Various Artists	BNA
38	Kenny Rogers	Kenny Rogers	Madacy
15	King of the Mountains	Rodney Carrington	Capitol Nashville
43	Life's a Dance	Various Artists	Word/Curb
45	Live at the Avalon Ballroom 1969	Gram Parsons	Amoeba
37	The Love Songs	Clint Black	Equity Music Group
36	Mary Did You Know	Various Artists	Word/Curb
48	A Redneck Christmas	Slidawg and the Redneck Ramblers	Madacy
37	Ricky Skaggs & Bruce Hornsby	Ricky Skaggs & Bruce Hornsby	Legacy
41	Right About Now	Ty Herndon	Titan Pyramid
45	Salt of the Earth	Ricky Skaggs & The Whites	Skaggs Family
49	Songbird: Rare Tracks and Forgotten Gems	Emmylou Harris	Rhino
11	Songs 4 Worship: Country	Various Artists	Time Life
26	Songs of the Season	Randy Travis	Word/Curb
14	The Taylor Swift Holiday Collection	Taylor Swift	Big Machine
46	Translated from Love	Kelly Willis	Rykodisc
19	Unglamorous	Lori McKenna	Warner Bros. Nashville
49	Upfront & Down Low	Teddy Thompson	Verve Forecast
29	The Very Best of Tracy Lawrence	Tracy Lawrence	Rhino
21	The Very Best of Travis Tritt	Travis Tritt	Rhino
25	Whiskey Falls	Whiskey Falls	Midas
12	The Wolf	Shooter Jennings	Universal South

== Births ==
- July 12 – Ty Myers, singer-songwriter of the 2020s ("Ends of the Earth").

== Deaths ==
- January 1 – Del Reeves, 74, best known for his "girl-watching" novelty-type songs (e.g., "Girl on the Billboard"). (emphysema)
- January 6 – Sneaky Pete Kleinow, 72, pedal steel guitarist for the Flying Burrito Brothers. (complications from Alzheimer's disease)
- January 13 – Doyle Holly, 70, member of Buck Owens' Buckaroos; he also had a string of minor hits in the early to mid-1970s. (prostate cancer)
- February 2 – Terry McMillan, 53, veteran Nashville session harmonica player and percussionist. (natural causes)
- March 24 – Henson Cargill, 66, country performer best known for 1968 smash "Skip a Rope." (surgical complications)
- April 17 – Glenn Sutton, 69, songwriter and producer best known for the hit "(I Never Promised You a) Rose Garden"; a chief architect of the countrypolitan sound of the late 1960s/early 1970s. (heart attack)
- July 3 – Boots Randolph, 80, member of Nashville's famed "A-Team" of musicians; he was the saxophonist (subdural hematoma)
- September 26 – Patrick Bourque, 29, bass guitarist for the group Emerson Drive. (suicide)
- October 28 – Porter Wagoner, 80, rhinestone-suited country music icon, television program host of the 1960s and 1970s, duet partner of Dolly Parton. (lung cancer)
- November 6 – Hank Thompson, 82, Western-swing styled artist best known for "The Wild Side of Life", 1960's "A Six Pack to Go", and others. (lung cancer)
- November 18 – John Hughey, 73, steel guitarist known for his "crying steel" style of playing (Heart complications)
- November 29 – Jim Nesbitt, 75, best known for the hits "Please Mr. Kennedy", "A Tiger in My Tank" and "Runnin' Bare". (Extended battle with a heart condition)
- November 30 – Ralph Ezell, 54, bass guitarist and co-founding member of the 1980s and 1990s group Shenandoah. (heart attack)
- December 16 – Dan Fogelberg, 56, Many pop hits with a few minor country hits, including "Same Old Lang Syne" (prostate cancer)

== Hall of Fame inductees ==
=== Bluegrass Music Hall of Fame inductees ===
- Howard Watts ("Cedric Rainwater")
- Carl Story

=== Country Music Hall of Fame inductees ===
- Ralph Emery (1933-2022), disc jockey and television host from the 1960s onward.
- Vince Gill (born 1957), singer-songwriter and musician who rose to prominence in the 1980s.
- Mel Tillis (1932–2017), singer and songwriter who rose to fame in the 1950s.

=== Canadian Country Music Hall of Fame inductees ===
- John Allan Cameron
- Sheila Hamilton
- Cliff Dumas

== Major awards ==
=== Grammy Awards ===
(presented February 10, 2008 in Los Angeles)

- Best Female Country Vocal Performance – "Before He Cheats", Carrie Underwood
- Best Male Country Vocal Performance – "Stupid Boy", Keith Urban
- Best Country Performance by a Duo or Group with Vocal – "How Long", Eagles
- Best Country Collaboration with Vocals – "Lost Highway", Willie Nelson and Ray Price
- Best Country Instrumental Performance – "Throttleneck", Brad Paisley
- Best Country Song – "Before He Cheats", Josh Kear and Chris Tompkins
- Best Country Album – These Days, Vince Gill
- Best Bluegrass Album – The Bluegrass Diaries, Jim Lauderdale

=== Juno Awards ===
(presented April 6, 2008 in Calgary)

- Country Recording of the Year – Risk, Paul Brandt

=== CMT Music Awards ===
(presented April 16 in Nashville)

- Video of the Year – "Before He Cheats", Carrie Underwood
- Male Video of the Year – "You Save Me", Kenny Chesney
- Female Video of the Year – "Before He Cheats", Carrie Underwood
- Group Video of the Year – "What Hurts the Most", Rascal Flatts
- Duo Video of the Year – "Want To," Sugarland
- Breakthrough Video of the Year – "Tim McGraw", Taylor Swift
- Wide Open Country Video of the Year – "Love You," Jack Ingram
- Video Director of the Year – "Before He Cheats", Carrie Underwood (Director: Roman White)
- Johnny Cash Visionary Award – Kris Kristofferson

=== Americana Music Honors & Awards ===
- Album of the Year – Children Running Through (Patty Griffin)
- Artist of the Year – Patty Griffin
- Duo/Group of the Year – The Avett Brothers
- Song of the Year – "Hank Williams' Ghost" (Darrell Scott)
- Emerging Artist of the Year – The Avett Brothers
- Instrumentalist of the Year – Buddy Miller
- Spirit of Americana/Free Speech Award – Mavis Staples
- Lifetime Achievement: Trailblazer – Lyle Lovett
- Lifetime Achievement: Songwriting – Willie Nelson
- Lifetime Achievement: Performance – Joe Ely
- Lifetime Achievement: Instrumentalist – Ry Cooder
- Lifetime Achievement: Executive – Mary Martin
- Lifetime Achievement: Producer/Engineer – Jim Dickinson
- Wagonmaster Award – Porter Wagoner

=== Academy of Country Music ===
(presented May 18, 2008 in Las Vegas)

- Entertainer of the Year – Kenny Chesney
- Song of the Year – "Stay", Sugarland
- Single of the Year – "Stay", Sugarland
- Album of the Year – Crazy Ex-Girlfriend, Miranda Lambert
- Top Male Vocalist – Brad Paisley
- Top Female Vocalist – Carrie Underwood
- Top Vocal Duo – Brooks & Dunn
- Top Vocal Group – Rascal Flatts
- Top New Male Vocalist – Jack Ingram
- Top New Female Vocalist – Taylor Swift
- Top New Duo or Group – Lady Antebellum
- Video of the Year – "Online", Brad Paisley
- Vocal Event of the Year – "Find out Who Your Friends Are", Tracy Lawrence, Tim McGraw and Kenny Chesney
- ACM/Home Depot Humanitarian Award – Rascal Flatts
- Cliffie Stone Pioneer Award – Brenda Lee, The Oak Ridge Boys, Conway Twitty, Porter Wagoner
- Crystal Milestone Award – Garth Brooks
- Poets Award – Bill Anderson and Fred Rose

=== ARIA Awards ===
(presented in Sydney on October 28, 2007)

- Best Country Album – Love, Pain & the Whole Crazy Thing (Keith Urban)
- ARIA Hall of Fame – Frank Ifield

=== Canadian Country Music Association ===
(presented September 10 in Regina)

- Kraft Cheez Whiz Fans' Choice Award – Terri Clark
- Male Artist of the Year – Brad Johner
- Female Artist of the Year – Carolyn Dawn Johnson
- Group or Duo of the Year – Emerson Drive
- SOCAN Song of the Year – "Hold My Beer", Mitch Merrett, Aaron Pritchett, and Deric Ruttan
- Single of the Year – "Moments", Emerson Drive
- Album of the Year – Doc Walker, Doc Walker
- Top Selling Album – Taking the Long Way, Dixie Chicks
- CMT Video of the Year – "Moments", Emerson Drive
- Chevy Trucks Rising Star Award – Shane Yellowbird
- Roots Artist or Group of the Year – Corb Lund

=== Country Music Association ===
(presented November 7 in Nashville)

- Entertainer of the Year – Kenny Chesney
- Song of the Year – "Give It Away", Bill Anderson, Jamey Johnson and Buddy Cannon
- Single of the Year – "Before He Cheats", Carrie Underwood
- Album of the Year – It Just Comes Natural, George Strait
- Male Vocalist of the Year – Brad Paisley
- Female Vocalist of the Year – Carrie Underwood
- Vocal Duo of the Year – Sugarland
- Vocal Group of the Year – Rascal Flatts
- Horizon Award – Taylor Swift
- Video of the Year – "Online", Brad Paisley (Director: Jason Alexander)
- Vocal Event of the Year – "Find Out Who Your Friends Are", Tracy Lawrence with Tim McGraw and Kenny Chesney
- Musician of the Year – Jerry Douglas

== Other links ==
- Country Music Association
- Inductees of the Country Music Hall of Fame
