= 2008 Country Music Association Awards =

Annual US music awards ceremony

- Date: November 12, 2008
- Location: Sommet Center, Nashville, Tennessee, U.S.
- Hosted by: Brad Paisley; Carrie Underwood

Highlights
- Most wins: Brad Paisley; George Strait (2 each)
- Most nominations: Kenny Chesney; Sugarland (6 each)

Television/radio coverage
- Network: ABC

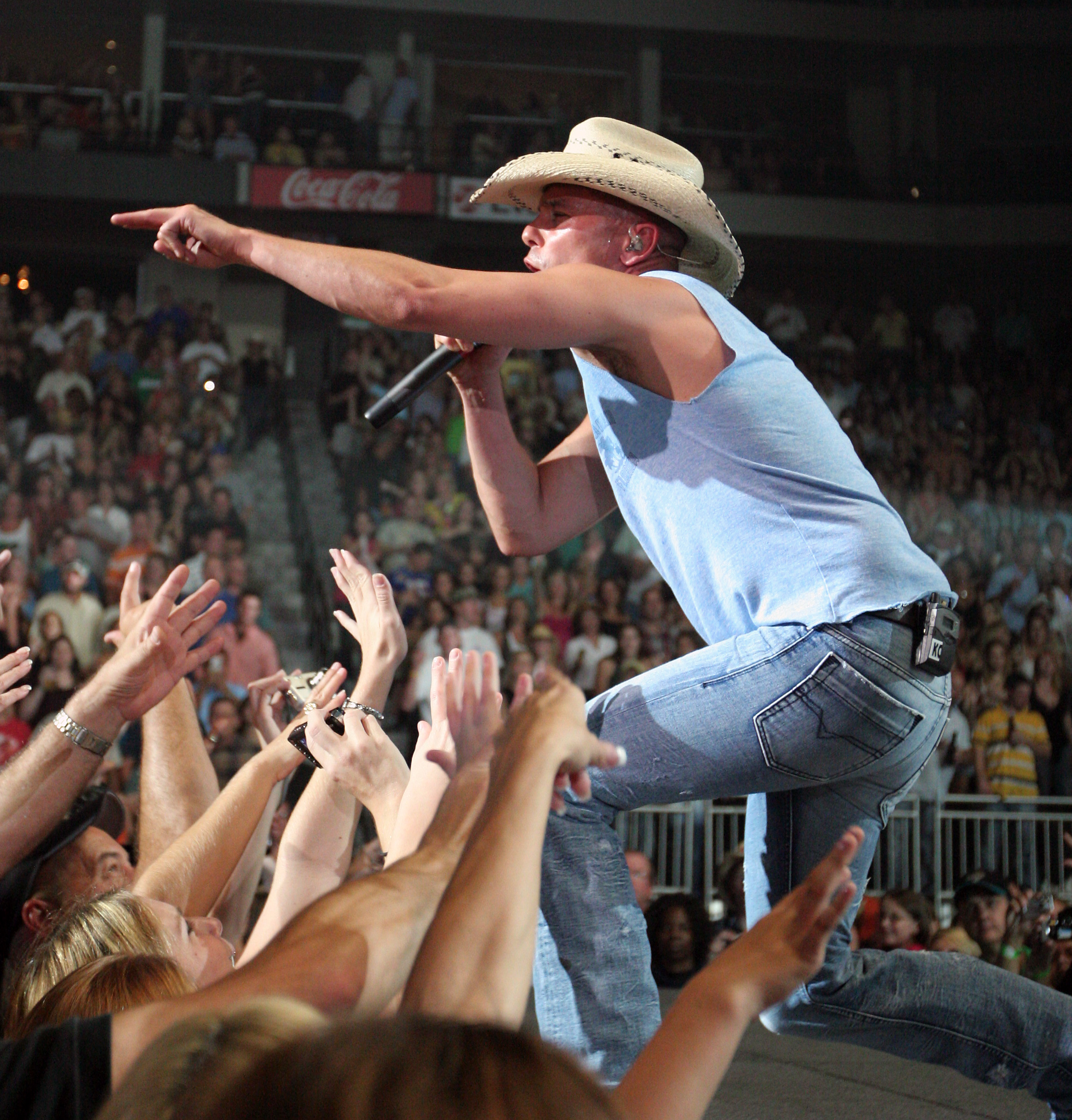
Kenny Chesney, Entertainer of the Year recipient.

The 2008 Country Music Association Awards, 42nd Annual Ceremony, was held on November 12, 2008, at the Sommet Center in Nashville, Tennessee and was hosted by CMA Award winners Brad Paisley and Carrie Underwood. Kenny Chesney and Sugarland led the night with 6 nomination each.

== Winners and nominees ==
Winners are shown in bold.

Entertainer of the Year	Album of the Year
**Kenny Chesney**; Brad Paisley; George Strait; Sugarland; Keith Urban	**Troubadour** **— George Strait**; Carnival Ride — Carrie Underwood; Cowboy Town — Brooks & Dunn; Good Time — Alan Jackson; Just Who I Am: Poets & Pirates — Kenny Chesney
Male Vocalist of the Year	Female Vocalist of the Year
**Brad Paisley**; Kenny Chesney; Alan Jackson; George Strait; Keith Urban	**Carrie Underwood**; Alison Krauss; Miranda Lambert; Martina McBride; Taylor Swift
Vocal Group of the Year	Vocal Duo of the Year
**Rascal Flatts**; Eagles; Emerson Drive; Lady A; Little Big Town	**Sugarland**; Big & Rich; Brooks & Dunn; Montgomery Gentry; The Wreckers
Single of the Year	Song of the Year
**"I Saw God Today"** — **George Strait**; "Don't Blink" — Kenny Chesney; "Gunpowder & Lead" — Miranda Lambert; "Stay" — Sugarland; "You're Gonna Miss This" — Trace Adkins	**"Stay"** — **Jennifer Nettles**; "Good Time" — Alan Jackson; "I Saw God Today" — Rodney Clawson, Monty Criswell & Wade Kirby; "Letter to Me" — Brad Paisley; "You're Gonna Miss This" — Ashley Gorley & Lee Thomas Miller
New Artist of the Year	Musician of the Year
**Lady Antebellum**; Jason Aldean; Rodney Atkins; James Otto; Kellie Pickler	**Mac McAnally**; Jerry Douglas; Paul Franklin; Dan Huff; Brent Mason
Music Video of the Year	Musical Event of the Year
**"Waitin' on a Woman"** — **Brad Paisley; (Dir. Jim Shea)**; "Don't Blink" — Kenny Chesney; (Dir. Shaun Silva); "Good Time" — Alan Jackson; (Dir. Trey Fanjoy); "Stay" — Sugarland; (Dir. Shaun Silva); "You're Gonna Miss This" — Trace Adkins; (Dir. Peter Zavadil)	**"Gone, Gone, Gone"** — **Robert Plant & Alison Krauss**; "Another Try" — Josh Turner (ft. Trisha Yearwood); "Every Other Weekend" — Reba McEntire (ft. Kenny Chesney); "Life in a Northern Town" — Sugarland (ft. Little Big Town & Jake Owen); "Shiftwork" — Kenny Chesney (ft. George Strait)

== Hall of Fame ==
Country Music Hall of Fame
- Tom T. Hall
- Emmylou Harris
- Ernest V. "Pop" Stoneman
- The Statler Brothers

== Performers ==
Artist(s)	Song(s)
Brad Paisley; Keith Urban	"Start A Band"
Kellie Pickler	"Best Days of Your Life"
Alan Jackson	"Good Time"
Miranda Lambert	"More Like Her"
Lady Antebellum	"Love Don't Live Here"
Martina McBride	"I Don't Want to See You Again"
Rodney Atkins	"It's America"
Taylor Swift	"Love Story"
Kid Rock	"All Summer Long"
George Strait	"River of Love"
Jason Aldean	"She's Country"
Brooks & Dunn; Reba McEntire	"Cowgirls Don't Cry"
Darius Rucker	"Don't Think I Don't Think About It"
Brad Paisley	"Waitin' on a Woman"
Keith Urban	"Sweet Thing"
Carrie Underwood	"Just a Dream"
Sugarland	"Love"
James Otto	"Just Got Started Lovin' You"
Kenny Chesney	"Everyone Wants to Go to Heaven"
Trace Adkins	"You're Gonna Miss This"
The Eagles	"Busy Being Fabulous"

== Presenters ==
Presenter(s)	Award
Hugh Jackman and Nicole Kidman	Single of the Year
Billy Ray Cyrus and Miley Cyrus	Song of the Year
Heidi Newfield and John Rich	Vocal Group of the Year
Taylor Swift	New Artist of the Year
Julianne Hough, Jimmy Wayne, and Jake Owen	Vocal Duo of the Year
Lee Ann Womack and Josh Turner	Album of the Year
Vince Gill	Female Vocalist of the Year
Reese Witherspoon	Male Vocalist of the Year
Shania Twain	Entertainer of the Year

- Vince Gill - recognized the Country Music Hall of Fame Inductees
