= 2007 Country Music Association Awards =

Annual US music awards ceremony

- Date: November 7, 2007
- Location: Sommet Center, Nashville, Tennessee, US
- Hosted by: Various guests

Highlights
- Most wins: Kenny Chesney; Brad Paisley; Carrie Underwood (2 each)
- Most nominations: Brad Paisley; George Strait (5 each)

Television/radio coverage
- Network: ABC

The 2007 Country Music Association Award, 41st Ceremony, was held on November 7, 2007, at the Sommet Center (later the Bridgestone Arena) in Nashville, Tennessee. The ceremony did not feature a host, but artists and guests introduced and presented awards throughout the evening. Brad Paisley, George Strait led the night with 5 nominations each including, Album of the Year and Entertainer of the Year.

== Winners and nominees ==
Winners are shown in bold.

Entertainer of the Year	Album of the Year
**Kenny Chesney**; Rascal Flatts; George Strait; Keith Urban; Brad Paisley	**It Just Comes Natural** **— George Strait**; Long Trip Alone — Dierks Bentley; Love, Pain & the Whole Crazy Thing — Keith Urban; 5th Gear — Brad Paisley; These Days — Vince Gill
Male Vocalist of the Year	Female Vocalist of the Year
**Brad Paisley**; Keith Urban; Kenny Chesney; George Strait; Josh Turner	**Carrie Underwood**; Alison Krauss; Miranda Lambert; Martina McBride; Reba McEntire
Vocal Group of the Year	Vocal Duo of the Year
**Rascal Flatts**; Little Big Town; Alison Krauss & Union Station; Dixie Chicks; Emerson Drive	**Sugarland**; Big & Rich; Brooks & Dunn; Montgomery Gentry; The Wreckers
Single of the Year	Song of the Year
**"Before He Cheats" — Carrie Underwood**; "Anyway" — Martina McBride; "Lost in This Moment" — Big & Rich; "Ticks" — Brad Paisley; "Wrapped" — George Strait	**"Give It Away" — Bill Anderson, Buddy Cannon and Jamey Johnson**; "Anyway" — Martina McBride, Brad Warren and Brett Warren; "Before He Cheats" — Josh Kear and Chris Tompkins; "Lost in This Moment" — John Rich, Keith Anderson and Rodney Clawson; "Stupid Boy" — Dave Berg, Deanna Bryant and Sarah Buxton
Horizon Award	Musician of the Year
**Taylor Swift**; Jason Aldean; Rodney Atkins; Little Big Town; Kellie Pickler	**Jerry Douglas**; Dann Huff; Mac McAnally; Randy Scruggs; Eddie Flowers Jr.
Music Video of the Year	Musical Event of the Year
**"Online" — Brad Paisley; (Dir. Jason Alexander)**; "Anyway" — Martina McBride; (Dir. Deaton-Flanigen Productions); "Before He Cheats" — Carrie Underwood; (Dir. Roman White); "Moments" — Emerson Drive; (Dir. Steven Goldmann); "You Save Me" — Kenny Chesney; (Dir. Shaun Silva)	**"Find Out Who Your Friends Are"** — **Tracy Lawrence, Tim McGraw and Kenny Chesney**; "Because of You" — Kelly Clarkson and Reba McEntire; "Hey, Good Lookin'" — Jimmy Buffett, George Strait and Alan Jackson; "Missing You" — Alison Krauss and John Waite; "The Reason Why" — Vince Gill and Alison Krauss
International Artist Achievement Award
**Dwight Yoakam**

== Hall of Fame ==
Country Music Hall Of Fame Inductees
- Ralph Emery
- Vince Gill
- Mel Tillis

== Performers ==
Artist(s)	Song(s)
Rascal Flatts	"Still Feels Good"
Miranda Lambert	"Gunpowder & Lead"
George Strait	"How 'bout Them Cowgirls"
Taylor Swift	"Our Song"
Brad Paisley	"Online"
Alison Krauss	"Simple Love"
Big & Rich	"Loud"
Rodney Atkins	"These Are My People"
Carrie Underwood	"So Small"
The Eagles	"How Long"
Brooks & Dunn	"God Must Be Busy"
Jason Aldean	"Johnny Cash"
Sugarland	"Stay"
Martina McBride	"For These Times"
Keith Urban	"Everybody"
Reba McEntire; LeAnn Rimes	"When You Love Someone Like That"
Little Big Town	"Boondocks"
Kenny Chesney	"Don't Blink"
Josh Turner	"Firecracker"
Kellie Pickler	"I Wonder"
Rascal Flatts; Jamie Foxx	"She Goes All the Way"

== Presenters ==
Presenter(s)	Award
Sheryl Crow	Single of the Year
Montgomery Gentry	Song of the Year
Luke Bryan, Bucky Covington, John Michael Carroll	Vocal Group of the Year
Blake Shelton, Jewel, and Ty Murray	Vocal Duo of the Year
Dwight Yoakam	Album of the Year
Carrie Underwood	Horizon Award
Dierks Bentley	Female Vocalist of the Year
Gretchen Wilson and Kid Rock	Male Vocalist of the Year
Reba McEntire	Entertainer of the Year

- James Denton - introduced Miranda Lambert, George Strait, and Taylor Swift
- Sara Evans - introduced Brad Paisley, Alison Krauss, Big & Rich, and Rodney Atkins
- Kate Walsh - introduced Carrie Underwood, Brooks & Dunn, and Jason Aldean
- Vince Gill - introduced The Eagles
- Dwight Yoakam - introduced Sugarland
- LeAnn Rimes - introduced Martina McBride, Keith Urban, Reba McEntire, and recognized the Country Music Hall of Fame Inductees
- Kimberly Williams-Paisley - introduced Kenny Chesney, Josh Turner, Kellie Pickler, and Rascal Flatts with Jamie Foxx
