= 2009 Subway Fresh Fit 500 =

Car race

Race details
- Race 8 of 36 in the 2009 NASCAR Sprint Cup Series
- 2009 Subway Fresh Fit 500 program cover
- Date: April 18, 2009
- Location: Phoenix International Raceway in Avondale, Arizona
- Course: Permanent racing facility
- Course length: 1 miles (1.6 km)
- Distance: 312 laps, 312 mi (502.115 km)
- Weather: Temperatures reaching up to 95 °F (35 °C); wind speeds up to 9.9 miles per hour (15.9 km/h)
- Average speed: 108.042 miles per hour (173.877 km/h)

Pole position
Driver	Mark Martin	Hendrick Motorsports
- Time: 26.903

Most laps led
Driver	Mark Martin	Hendrick Motorsports
- Laps: 157

Winner
No. 5	Mark Martin	Hendrick Motorsports

Television in the United States
- Network: Fox
- Announcers: Mike Joy, Darrell Waltrip and Larry McReynolds

The 2009 Subway Fresh Fit 500 was the eighth stock car race of the 2009 NASCAR Sprint Cup Series. It was held on April 18, 2009 at Phoenix International Speedway in Avondale, Arizona.

== Background ==
Phoenix International Raceway is one of five short tracks to hold NASCAR races; the others are Richmond International Raceway, Dover International Speedway, Bristol Motor Speedway, and Martinsville Speedway. The standard track at Phoenix International Raceway is a four-turn short track oval that is 1 mile (1.6 km) long. The track's turns were banked at 11 degrees, while the front stretch, the location of the finish line, was banked at three degrees. The back stretch, which has a dogleg shape instead of a straight, has 9 degrees of banking. The racetrack has seats for 76,800 spectators.

Before the race, Jeff Gordon led the Drivers' Championship with 1,154 points, followed by Jimmie Johnson in second on 992 points. Kurt Busch was in third on 974 points, Clint Bowyer was fourth with 967 points, and Tony Stewart was fifth on 963 points. Denny Hamlin, Kyle Busch, Carl Edwards, Matt Kenseth, Kasey Kahne rounded out the top ten. In the Manufacturers' Championship, Chevrolet was leading with 48 points, ten points ahead of their rival Ford in second. Toyota, with 37 points, was six points ahead of Dodge in the battle for third. Johnson was the race's defending champion.

== Entry list ==
Car	Driver	Make	Team
00	David Reutimann	Toyota	Michael Waltrip
1	Martin Truex Jr.	Chevrolet	Teresa Earnhardt
02	Brandon Ash	Dodge	Kenneth Wood
2	Kurt Busch	Dodge	Walter Czarnecki
5	Mark Martin	Chevrolet	Mary Hendrick
06	Trevor Boys	Dodge	Theresa Boys
6	David Ragan	Ford	Mike Dee
07	Casey Mears	Chevrolet	Richard Childress
7	Robby Gordon	Toyota	Robby Gordon
09	Sterling Marlin	Dodge	James Finch
9	Kasey Kahne	Dodge	George Gillett Jr.
11	Denny Hamlin	Toyota	J.D. Gibbs
12	David Stremme	Dodge	Roger Penske
14	Tony Stewart	Chevrolet	Margaret Haas
16	Greg Biffle	Ford	Jack Roush
17	Matt Kenseth	Ford	John Henry
18	Kyle Busch	Toyota	Joe Gibbs
19	Elliott Sadler	Dodge	George Gillett Jr.
20	Joey Logano	Toyota	Joe Gibbs
24	Jeff Gordon	Chevrolet	Rick Hendrick
26	Jamie McMurray	Ford	Geoff Smith
29	Kevin Harvick	Chevrolet	Richard Childress
31	Jeff Burton	Chevrolet	Richard Childress
33	Clint Bowyer	Chevrolet	Bobby Ginn III
34	John Andretti	Chevrolet	Teresa Earnhardt
36	Scott Riggs	Toyota	Tommy Baldwin
39	Ryan Newman	Chevrolet	Tony Stewart
41	Jeremy Mayfield	Toyota	Jeremy Mayfield
42	Juan Pablo Montoya	Chevrolet	Teresa Earnhardt
43	Reed Sorenson	Dodge	Richard Petty
44	A.J. Allmendinger	Dodge	George Gillett Jr.
47	Marcos Ambrose	Toyota	Rob Kauffman
48	Jimmie Johnson	Chevrolet	Jeff Gordon
51	Dexter Bean	Dodge	David Bean
55	Michael Waltrip	Toyota	Michael Waltrip
64	Todd Bodine	Toyota	Larry Gunselman
66	Dave Blaney	Toyota	Phil Parsons
71	David Gilliland	Chevrolet	Kevin Buckler
73	Tony Raines	Dodge	Barry Haefele
77	Sam Hornish Jr.	Dodge	Bill Davis
78	Regan Smith	Chevrolet	Barney Visser
82	Scott Speed	Toyota	Dietrich Mateschitz
83	Brian Vickers	Toyota	Dietrich Mateschitz
87	Joe Nemechek	Toyota	Andrea Nemechek
88	Dale Earnhardt Jr.	Chevrolet	Rick Hendrick
96	Bobby Labonte	Ford	Jeffrey Moorad
98	Paul Menard	Ford	Max Jones
99	Carl Edwards	Ford	Jack Roush

== Qualifying ==
Martin took the pole at Phoenix with a speed of 133.814 mph, 0.018 seconds in front of second place, Kyle Busch. Kurt Busch took third place 0.23 seconds of the leader and Jeff Gordon and Brian Vickers rounded out the top five.

Start	Car	Driver	Make	Avg. Speed	Time	Behind
1	5	Mark Martin	Chevrolet	133.814	26.903	0.000
2	18	Kyle Busch	Toyota	133.725	26.921	00.018
3	2	Kurt Busch	Dodge	133.700	26.926	00.023
4	24	Jeff Gordon	Chevrolet	133.690	26.928	00.025
5	83	Brian Vickers	Toyota	133.551	26.956	00.053
6	14	Tony Stewart	Chevrolet	133.487	26.969	00.066
7	98	Paul Menard	Ford	133.482	26.970	00.067
8	00	David Reutimann	Toyota	133.457	26.975	00.072
9	78	Regan Smith	Chevrolet	133.437	26.979	00.076
10	48	Jimmie Johnson	Chevrolet	133.338	26.999	00.096
11	99	Carl Edwards	Ford	133.318	27.003	00.100
12	11	Denny Hamlin	Toyota	133.259	27.015	00.112
13	16	Greg Biffle	Ford	133.240	27.019	00.116
14	6	David Ragan	Ford	133.156	27.036	00.133
15	88	Dale Earnhardt Jr	Chevrolet	133.121	27.043	00.140
16	31	Jeff Burton	Chevrolet	133.077	27.052	00.149
17	17	Matt Kenseth	Ford	133.023	27.063	00.160
18	82	Scott Speed	Toyota	132.831	27.102	00.199
19	12	David Stremme	Dodge	132.812	27.106	00.203
20	42	Juan Pablo Montoya	Chevrolet	132.631	27.143	00.240
21	9	Kasey Kahne	Dodge	132.626	27.144	00.241
22	87	Joe Nemechek	Toyota	132.616	27.146	00.243
23	7	Robby Gordon	Toyota	132.607	27.148	00.245
24	33	Clint Bowyer	Chevrolet	132.602	27.149	00.246
25	44	AJ Allmendinger	Dodge	132.558	27.158	00.255
26	1	Martin Truex Jr	Chevrolet	132.519	27.166	00.263
27	71	David Gilliland	Chevrolet	132.499	27.170	00.267
28	26	Jamie McMurray	Ford	132.470	27.176	00.273
29	47	Marcos Ambrose	Toyota	132.402	27.190	00.287
30	39	Ryan Newman	Chevrolet	132.353	27.200	00.297
31	20	Joey Logano	Toyota	132.168	27.238	00.335
32	55	Michael Waltrip	Toyota	132.086	27.255	00.352
33	29	Kevin Harvick	Chevrolet	132.023	27.268	00.365
34	66	Dave Blaney	Toyota	131.950	27.283	00.380
35	77	Sam Hornish Jr	Dodge	131.936	27.286	00.383
36	43	Reed Sorenson	Dodge	131.825	27.309	00.406
37	36	Scott Riggs	Toyota	131.670	27.341	00.438
38	07	Casey Mears	Chevrolet	131.608	27.354	00.451
39	09	Sterling Marlin	Dodge	131.521	27.372	00.469
40	19	Elliott Sadler	Dodge	130.928	27.496	00.593
41	34	John Andretti	Chevrolet	130.567	27.572	00.669
42	96	Bobby Labonte	Ford	130.534	27.579	00.676
43	73	Tony Raines	Dodge	131.406	27.396	00.493
Failed to qualify
44	64	Todd Bodine	Toyota	130.676	27.549	
45	41	Jeremy Mayfield	Toyota	130.317	27.625	
46	51	Dexter Bean	Dodge	129.716	27.753	
47	02	Brandon Ash	Dodge	128.141	28.094	
48	06	Trevor Boys	Dodge	124.249	28.974	

== Race recap ==
Phoenix International Raceway chaplain Ken Bowers would give out the invocation. Big Machine Records recording artists Kate & Kacey sang the national anthem for this race and future talk show host Michael Strahan delivered the command to start engines 5 minutes after the anthem was sung.

Mark Martin started from the pole and dominated the first one hundred laps of the race, relinquishing the lead only under caution. At this point, the front runners were Martin, Kurt Busch, Kyle Busch, and Tony Stewart. Those four were consistently in the top five for the first two hundred laps. On lap 167, the caution came out for Robby Gordon's wreck and several cars stayed out. By lap 267, all cars that have stayed out have pitted except Dale Earnhardt Jr. On lap 300, Earnhardt made slight contact with Casey Mears and hit the wall. Ryan Newman, during this caution, accidentally stayed out of the pits because of having radio problems. He was the only car that didn't pit. On the restart, Martin blew by Newman and cruised to his first win since August 2005.

== Results ==
Fin	St	#	Driver	Make	Laps	Led	Status	Pts
1	1	5	Mark Martin	Chevy	312	157	running	195
2	6	14	Tony Stewart	Chevy	312	19	running	175
3	3	2	Kurt Busch	Dodge	312	63	running	170
4	10	48	Jimmie Johnson	Chevy	312	1	running	165
5	13	16	Greg Biffle	Ford	312	0	running	155
6	12	11	Denny Hamlin	Toyota	312	0	running	150
7	26	1	Martin Truex Jr.	Chevy	312	0	running	146
8	8	00	David Reutimann	Toyota	312	1	running	147
9	35	77	Sam Hornish Jr.	Dodge	312	0	running	138
10	11	99	Carl Edwards	Ford	312	0	running	134
11	28	26	Jamie McMurray	Ford	312	0	running	130
12	36	43	Reed Sorenson	Dodge	312	0	running	127
13	21	9	Kasey Kahne	Dodge	312	0	running	124
14	29	47	Marcos Ambrose	Toyota	312	0	running	121
15	16	31	Jeff Burton	Chevy	312	0	running	118
16	30	39	Ryan Newman	Chevy	312	4	running	120
17	2	18	Kyle Busch	Toyota	312	0	running	112
18	19	12	David Stremme	Dodge	311	0	running	109
19	5	83	Brian Vickers	Toyota	311	2	running	111
20	38	07	Casey Mears	Chevy	311	0	running	103
21	31	20	Joey Logano	Toyota	311	0	running	100
22	14	6	David Ragan	Ford	311	0	running	97
23	7	98	Paul Menard	Ford	311	0	running	94
24	20	42	Juan Pablo Montoya	Chevy	311	0	running	91
25	4	24	Jeff Gordon	Chevy	311	0	running	88
26	24	33	Clint Bowyer	Chevy	311	0	running	85
27	17	17	Matt Kenseth	Ford	311	0	running	82
28	9	78	Regan Smith	Chevy	311	0	running	79
29	42	96	Bobby Labonte	Ford	311	1	running	81
30	33	29	Kevin Harvick	Chevy	311	0	running	73
31	15	88	Dale Earnhardt Jr.	Chevy	310	63	running	75
32	40	19	Elliott Sadler	Dodge	310	0	running	67
33	27	71	David Gilliland	Chevy	310	0	running	64
34	18	82	Scott Speed	Toyota	310	0	running	61
35	25	44	A.J. Allmendinger	Dodge	309	0	running	58
36	37	36	Scott Riggs	Toyota	307	0	running	55
37	32	55	Michael Waltrip	Toyota	307	1	running	57
38	41	34	John Andretti	Chevy	307	0	running	49
39	23	7	Robby Gordon	Toyota	243	0	running	46
40	39	09	Sterling Marlin	Dodge	117	0	crash	43
41	22	87	Joe Nemechek	Toyota	76	0	rear axle	40
42	34	66	Dave Blaney	Toyota	59	0	brakes	37
43	43	73	Tony Raines	Dodge	56	0	brakes	34

Previous race: 2009 Samsung 500	Sprint Cup Series; 2009 season	Next race: 2009 Aaron's 499
