= Troubadour (song) =

Single by George Strait

from the album Troubadour
- Released: June 2, 2008
- Genre: Neotraditional country
- Length: 2:56
- Label: MCA Nashville
- Songwriters: Leslie Satcher; Monty Holmes
- Producers: Tony Brown; George Strait

George Strait singles chronology
"I Saw God Today" (2008)	"Troubadour" (2008)	"River of Love" (2008)

Music video
- "Troubadour" at CMT.com

"Troubadour" is a song written by Leslie Satcher and Monty Holmes, and recorded by American country music singer George Strait. It was released in June 2008 as the second single and title track from his album Troubadour. The song was the 86th chart single of his career. It has become his 79th Top Ten single on the Billboard Hot Country Songs chart. "Troubadour" was nominated for Best Male Country Vocal Performance at the 2009 Grammy Awards. Vince Gill sings background vocals on the single.

== Content ==
The song is a ballad in which the narrator reflects on his life as a troubadour, feeling that he is content with what he has accomplished ("I was a young troubadour when I rode in on a song / I'll be an old troubadour when I'm gone").

== Personnel ==
Credits are adapted from the liner notes of Troubadour.

- Eddie Bayers – drums
- Stuart Duncan – fiddle
- Paul Franklin – steel guitar
- Steve Gibson – electric guitar
- Vince Gill – background vocals
- Wes Hightower – background vocals
- Brent Mason – electric guitar
- Mac McAnally – acoustic guitar
- Steve Nathan – Hammond B-3 organ
- Matt Rollings – piano
- Glenn Worf – bass guitar

== Commercial performance ==
The song reached No. 7 on Billboard's Hot Country Songs and Country Airplay for the chart dated September 27, 2008. The song was certified Platinum by the RIAA on July 15, 2022, and has sold 949,000 copies in the United States as of November 2016.

== Music video ==
In August 2008, Strait released a music video for the song. Directed by Trey Fanjoy, and edited by Scott Mele, the song's video alternates between footage of him singing, and shots of archived photos from various points in his career. This is his first music video since 2006's "The Seashores of Old Mexico", which Fanjoy also directed.

== Cover versions ==
In the 58th Annual Country Music Awards, Jamey Johnson, Miranda Lambert, and Parker McCollum cover the song aired on November 20, 2024.

== Chart history ==
Chart (2008)	Peak position
US Hot Country Songs (Billboard)	7
US Billboard Hot 100	54
Canada Country (Billboard)	3
Canada Hot 100 (Billboard)	74

=== Year-end charts ===
Chart (2008)	Position
US Country Songs (Billboard)	34

== Certifications ==
Certifications for Troubadour
Region	Certification	Certified units/sales
United States (RIAA)	3× Platinum	3,000,000^{‡}
^{‡} Sales+streaming figures based on certification alone.
