= Classic Christmas (George Strait album) =

Studio album by George Strait
- Released: October 7, 2008
- Recorded: 2006
- Genre: Country/Christmas
- Length: 25:44
- Label: MCA Nashville
- Producer: Tony Brown; George Strait

George Strait chronology
Troubadour (2008)	Classic Christmas (2008)	Twang (2009)

Professional ratings
Review scores
Source	Rating
About.com	link
Allmusic	link
The Music Box	link

Classic Christmas is an album of Christmas music recorded by country music artist George Strait. It was released by MCA Nashville on October 7, 2008. The album was previously released in 2006 under the title Fresh Cut Christmas and was available exclusively at Hallmark Gold Crown stores.

All songs in public domain.

== Track listing ==
No.	Title	Length
1.	"Joy to the World"
2.	"We Three Kings"
3.	"Silent Night"
4.	"Jingle Bells"
5.	"O Come, All Ye Faithful"
6.	"Up on the Housetop"
7.	"We Wish You a Merry Christmas"
8.	"O Christmas Tree"
9.	"Hark, the Herald Angels Sing"
10.	"Deck the Halls"

== Charts ==
=== Weekly charts ===
Chart (2008)	Peak position
US Billboard 200	86
US Top Country Albums (Billboard)	16
US Top Holiday Albums (Billboard)	5

=== Year-end charts ===
Chart (2009)	Position
US Top Country Albums (Billboard)	72
