= Dreaming Love =

Single by Kate & Kacey
- Released: April 27, 2009
- Genre: Country
- Length: 3:29
- Label: Big Machine
- Songwriters: Kate Coppola, Kacey Coppola
- Producer: Jeremy Stover

Music video
- "Dreaming Love" at CMT.com

"Dreaming Love" is a song written and recorded by American country duo Kate & Kacey. The song was released as their debut single on April 27, 2009. It was intended to serve as the lead-off single to their debut album with Big Machine Records, but the album was pushed back due to the song's mediocre chart success. In early 2010, it was announced that the duo had been released from their recording contract, leaving their debut album unreleased.

== Content ==
"Dreaming Love" is a mid-tempo song driven by banjo accompanied by an acoustic guitar (and during the chorus, percussion), and features a fiddle bridge. The song describes the narrator as being asleep and having dreams of love.

Kate & Kacey wrote the song themselves a couple of months before its release, and spoke of it in their interview with Matt Bjorke of Roughstock. "Whereas “You’re Not My Judge” says “nobody can tell me not to follow my dreams, I’m gonna follow them anyway,” this one’s sorta like that but it’s more talking about your own personal demons."

== Reception ==
Georgia Jukebox reviewer Amy Blizzard spoke positively of the song. "The song is expectedly youthful and the lyrics pleasant and simplistic." She noted that although it may have a limited appeal, "beautiful, crystal-clear vocals and impressive harmonies Kate & Kacey can easily hold their own and are a pair of rising young talents to keep an eye on for whom the best may be yet to come." Country Universe was less favorable, and gave the song a C+. "The song is plagued with a pretty but forgettable tune (slightly reminiscent in parts of Heidi Newfield’s “Johnny and June”), decidedly unmemorable vocals and unimaginative lyrics expounding on that n’er-written-about subject, love."

== Music video ==
A music video, directed by Kristin Barlowe, was released for the song to CMT on June 5, 2009. The video begins with Kate & Kacey lying asleep on a blanket. They are shown performing the song in a grassy meadow and driving in a Cadillac, following a man who is leaving handkerchiefs tied to trees along the side of the road. After picking up another guy at a gas station on the side of the road, the two end up at an elaborate tree house. Kacey and the man from the gas station stop halfway up the tree as Kate continues to follow the notes left by the other man. The final note she finds reads 'Wake up,' and the video ends with the two girls lying on the blanket asleep.

== Chart performance ==
"Dreaming Love" debuted on the Billboard Hot Country Songs chart at number 56 on May 9, 2009. The song spent 10 weeks on the chart, reaching a peak of number 51 in June 2009.

Chart (2009)	Peak position
US Hot Country Songs (Billboard)	51
