= Fresh Cut Christmas =

Studio album by George Strait
- Released: November or December 2006
- Studio: Starstruck (Nashville, Tennessee)
- Genre: Country/Christmas
- Length: 25:51
- Label: MCA Nashville
- Producer: Tony Brown; George Strait

George Strait chronology
It Just Comes Natural (2006)	Fresh Cut Christmas (2006)	Live at Texas Stadium (2007)

Fresh Cut Christmas is an album of Christmas music recorded by country music artist George Strait. The 10 classic Christmas songs were picked by Strait for this album. The album was available exclusively at Hallmark Gold Crown stores during November and December 2006. In one week the album achieved platinum status. It was re-released in 2008 with the same track list under the title Classic Christmas.

== Track listing ==
No.	Title	Length
1.	"Joy to the World"	2:30
2.	"We Three Kings"	2:33
3.	"Silent Night"	3:10
4.	"Jingle Bells"	2:28
5.	"O Come, All Ye Faithful"	3:28
6.	"Up on the Housetop"	2:46
7.	"We Wish You a Merry Christmas"	1:47
8.	"O Christmas Tree"	2:27
9.	"Hark, the Herald Angels Sing"	2:30
10.	"Deck the Halls"	1:59

== Personnel ==
As listed in liner notes

- Eddie Bayers – drums, percussion
- Eric Darken – percussion
- Stuart Duncan – fiddle, mandolin
- Thom Flora – background vocals
- Paul Franklin – steel guitar, dobro
- Steve Gibson – acoustic guitar, electric guitar
- Brent Mason – acoustic guitar, electric guitar
- Steve Nathan – piano, Wurlitzer, synthesizer
- George Strait – lead vocals
- Glenn Worf – bass guitar
- Andrea Zonn – background vocals

== Certifications ==
Certifications for Fresh Cut Christmas
Region	Certification	Certified units/sales
United States (RIAA)	Platinum	1,000,000^{^}
^{^} Shipments figures based on certification alone.
