= Kate & Kacey =

American country music duo

- Also known as: The Coppolas
- Origin: Denver, Colorado, USA
- Genre: Country
- Years active: 2008–present
- Labels: Big Machine, Sorella Coppola
- Members: Kate Coppola; Kacey Coppola

Kate & Kacey is an American country music duo consisting of identical twin sisters Kate Coppola and Kacey Coppola. In early 2008 they competed as a duo on the CMT series Can You Duet, where they took fourth place. In August 2008, they signed a recording contract with Big Machine Records. Their debut single, "Dreaming Love", was released on April 27, 2009, and it debuted on the Billboard Hot Country Songs chart at No. 56. The music video for "Dreaming Love" made its debut on CMT on June 5, 2009.

In January 2009, Kate & Kacey joined Little Big Town on tour as the group's opening act and hosted The Corona Sun City Tailgate Experience at several dates of Kenny Chesney's Sun City tour over the summer. The duo also made its Grand Ole Opry debut on May 8, 2009.

== Biography ==
Kate & Kacey grew up in Denver, Colorado, attended Cherry Creek High School, and later relocated to Nashville, Tennessee to pursue a career in country music. Although they have sparse musical influences, they felt drawn to the values and traditions of country music, having hope and a sense of family. The two are identical twins, Kate being older than Kacey by nine minutes, considers her personality very different than Kacey's, "We’re identical twins, but our personalities are so different. I am the more serious, responsible and stubborn twin. I’m very focused and Kacey is more playful, laid back and louder. She jokes around more." Kate & Kacey both provide vocals to their songs, which they frequently harmonize together, in addition to musical instruments. Kate Coppola plays the acoustic guitar, and Kacey plays the harmonica.

=== 2008-Present ===
They spent two and half years in Nashville writing songs and trying to get cut. During that time, they released an EP, titled Circle Around. Their big break came as contestants on CMT's Can You Duet in 2008. After finishing in fourth place, they met with Scott Borchetta, who signed them to Big Machine Records.

A self-titled EP album was released in early 2009 via Big Machine. Kate & Kacey released their debut single, "Dreaming Love", in April 2009 for their upcoming debut album that was planned for release in 2010. They returned to the Can You Duet stage to perform "Dreaming Love" for episode seven of the series' second season, which aired on August 1, 2009. The single peaked at No. 51 after ten weeks on the chart. A follow-up single was announced in late 2009, but was delayed. In early 2010, Kate & Kacey parted ways with Big Machine Records, thus leaving their debut record unreleased.

The duo began working independently on a new record, titled Crossroad, which was released in 2010. The album's first single, "Gypsy Soul," was released on October 18, 2010, however, the single failed to chart.

Their song, "House With No Doors," which they co-wrote with Jamey Johnson was recorded by George Strait for his Troubadour album. They also co-wrote the Grammy-nominated song "Macon" which Johnson recorded for his own The Guitar Song album.

Since then, the twins have continued to pursue music and write songs. They've written and produced commercial jingles for Colorforms Magic Fashion show and are the voices of Tiger Balms new company theme song. They released a Holiday single in Christmas of 2014. In 2015, they released their first book, co-written with their older sister Kara Coppola. The Daily Soul Sessions For The Pregnant Mama is a collection of 280 daily inspirations - one for each day of pregnancy. Their 2nd book, The Daily Soul Sessions For Every Mama will be released in November 2017 and is 365 inspirations, one for every day of the year.

== Personal lives ==
In 2010, Kacey married television host Rossi Morreale, who hosted the first season of Can You Duet in 2008, in which Kate & Kacey were contestants.

== Discography ==
=== Studio albums ===
Title	Album details
Circle Around	Release date: April 4, 2008; Label: self-released
Crossroad	Release date: December 14, 2010; Label: Sorella Coppola

=== Extended plays ===
Title	Album details
Kate & Kacey	Release date: January 12, 2009; Label: Big Machine Records

=== Singles ===
Year	Single	Peak positions	Album
Year	Single	US Country	Album
2009	"Dreaming Love"	51	Non-album song
2010	"Gypsy Soul (You Again)"	—	Crossroad
"—" denotes releases that did not chart

=== Music videos ===
Year	Video	Director
2008	"You're Not My Judge"	Mark Piznarski
2009	"Dreaming Love"	Kristin Barlowe/Steven Goldmann

== Songwriting ==
Year	Title	Album	Artist	Co-writer
2008	"House with No Doors"	Troubadour	George Strait	Jamey Johnson
