= Never Wanted Nothing More =

Single by Kenny Chesney

from the album Just Who I Am: Poets & Pirates
- Released: June 12, 2007
- Recorded: 2007
- Genre: Country
- Length: 3:29
- Label: BNA
- Songwriters: Ronnie Bowman; Chris Stapleton
- Producers: Buddy Cannon; Kenny Chesney

Kenny Chesney singles chronology
"Beer in Mexico" (2007)	"Never Wanted Nothing More" (2007)	"Don't Blink" (2007)

"Never Wanted Nothing More" is a song written by Ronnie Bowman and Chris Stapleton and recorded by American country music artist Kenny Chesney. It was released in June 2007 as the first single from Chesney's 2007 album Just Who I Am: Poets & Pirates. To date, it is his fastest-climbing number one single, reaching the top of the U.S. Billboard Hot Country Songs chart on its eighth chart week.

On the Billboard chart dated for the week of June 16, 2007, "Never Wanted Nothing More" debuted at number 37, due to airplay received before its official release. The song received airplay 56 hours before its official release date. The next chart week, it moved up from number 37 to number 17, and reached number one in its eighth chart week.

== Content ==
The song is a moderate up-tempo, accompanied by acoustic guitar and banjo. It features the narrator's recollections of the major highlights of his life, such as buying his first car, losing his virginity, getting married, and finding the Lord. With each recollection, he states that he "never wanted nothing more" than to do what he has done.

== Critical reception ==
Kevin John Coyne of Country Universe gave the song a "B+" and said that it is a "surprisingly twangy single, all plucky banjos and the like" and that it was a "promising first look at what will certainly be one of the year’s biggest albums."

== Chart performance ==
The song debuted at number 37 on the U.S. Billboard Hot Country Songs charts for the week of June 16, 2007.

Chart (2007)	Peak position
US Hot Country Songs (Billboard)	1
US Billboard Hot 100	22
US Billboard Pop 100	34
Canada Country (Billboard)	1
Canada Hot 100 (Billboard)	49

=== Year-end charts ===
Chart (2007)	Position
US Country Songs (Billboard)	3

== Certifications ==
Region	Certification	Certified units/sales
United States (RIAA)	Platinum	1,000,000^{‡}
^{‡} Sales+streaming figures based on certification alone.
