= River of Love =

Single by George Strait

from the album Troubadour
- Released: November 17, 2008
- Genre: Country
- Length: 3:15
- Label: MCA Nashville
- Songwriters: Billy Burnette, Shawn Camp, Dennis Morgan
- Producers: Tony Brown, George Strait

George Strait singles chronology
"Troubadour" (2008)	"River of Love" (2008)	"Living for the Night" (2009)

"River of Love" is a song written by Billy Burnette, Shawn Camp and Dennis Morgan, and recorded by American country music artist George Strait. It was released in November 2008 as the third single from the album Troubadour. The 87th single of his career, it is also his 80th Top Ten on the Billboard country charts, as well as his 44th and final Number One hit to date.

== Content ==
"River of Love" is a moderate up-tempo, with steel-string acoustic guitar and pedal steel guitar accompaniment. Shawn Camp, Billy Burnette and Dennis Morgan, who wrote the song, all sing backing vocals on it as well. The lyrics use a river as a metaphor for love ("Let's go rollin' on the river of love").

According to Country Weekly, Morgan had approached Camp with a melody in his mind. Camp then built on the melody by playing along with a ukulele that Cowboy Jack Clement had given him, when Burnette joined in on his own ukulele, and they came up with the line "river of love". According to Camp, "It was just such an infectious groove, and it just kind of rolled out. The whole song was just two chords and that lick."

== Personnel ==
Credits are adapted from the liner notes of Troubadour.

- Eddie Bayers – drums
- Billy Burnette – background vocals
- Shawn Camp – background vocals
- Stuart Duncan – mandolin
- Paul Franklin – steel guitar
- Steve Gibson – acoustic guitar
- Brent Mason – electric guitar
- Mac McAnally – acoustic guitar
- Dennis Morgan – background vocals
- Steve Nathan – Hammond B-3 organ
- Matt Rollings – Wurlitzer electric piano
- Glenn Worf – bass guitar

== Critical reception ==
Matt Bjorke of Roughstock, a country music review site, gave "River of Love" a mixed review. Although he called it an "undoubtedly fun song" and said "it's all about feel and groove", he added that "there's nothing really interesting about the song, other than the spirited steel guitar solo." Brady Vercher, in his review of Troubadour for Engine 145, described the song as having an "island vibe" similar to a Kenny Chesney song, calling it one of the weakest tracks on the album.

== Chart performance ==
"River of Love" debuted at number 45 on the Billboard Hot Country Songs charts dated for the week of November 22, 2008. The song became Strait's 44th and final Billboard Number One on the chart week of April 18, 2009. One week later, it fell to number 9, taking the biggest fall from number 1 on that chart since Carrie Underwood's "So Small" fell from number 1 to number 10 on the chart week of December 22, 2007.

Weekly chart performance
Chart (2008–2009)	Peak position
US Hot Country Songs (Billboard)	1
US Billboard Hot 100	59
Canada Country (Billboard)	6
Canada Hot 100 (Billboard)	77

=== Year-end charts ===
Annual chart rankings
Chart (2009)	Position
US Country Songs (Billboard)	5
US Radio Songs (Billboard)	78
