= Troubadour (George Strait album) =

Studio album by George Strait
- Released: April 1, 2008
- Recorded: 2007–2008
- Studios: Shrimpboat Sound (Key West, Florida); Keith Harter Music Studios (San Antonio, Texas); Back Stage Studio (Nashville, Tennessee).
- Genres: Neotraditional country; honky-tonk
- Length: 36:09
- Label: MCA Nashville
- Producers: Tony Brown; George Strait

George Strait chronology
22 More Hits (2007)	Troubadour (2008)	Classic Christmas (2008)

Singles from Troubadour
- 1. "I Saw God Today" Released: February 4, 2008; 2. "Troubadour" Released: June 2, 2008; 3. "River of Love" Released: November 17, 2008

Troubadour is the twenty-fifth studio album by American country music singer George Strait. It was released on April 1, 2008, on MCA Nashville Records. The album comprises twelve tracks, including two duets. The lead single, "I Saw God Today", was the highest-debuting single of Strait's career, and his forty-third number one on the Billboard country chart. The album has been certified platinum by the RIAA. At the 51st Grammy Awards, Troubadour earned the Grammy Award for Best Country Album, the first Grammy win of Strait's career. The album was intended to include the song "Everybody Wants to Go to Heaven", but after Strait decided not to include it on the album, it was later recorded by Kenny Chesney, and was released as the first single from his album Lucky Old Sun. "It Was Me" was originally recorded by Jamey Johnson on his 2006 album, The Dollar.

== Singles ==
"I Saw God Today", the lead single, debuted at No. 19 on the Billboard Hot Country Songs chart, giving Strait the highest chart debut of his career. This song went on to become his 43rd Billboard number one, and his 56th on all trade charts, setting a new record for most number-one singles. The album's title track was released in June 2008 as its second single, and peaked at No. 7 on the country chart. Following it was "River of Love", which debuted at No. 45 in November 2008, and reached No. 1 in April 2009.

== Critical reception ==
Professional ratings
Review scores
Source	Rating
411Mania	(8.5/10)
About.com	4.5/5 stars
Allmusic	4/5 stars
The Austin Chronicle	3/5 stars
Entertainment Weekly	B+
The Music Box	3/5 stars
Paste	(favorable)
PopMatters	7/10 stars
Robert Christgau	(dud)
Rolling Stone	3/5 stars
Slant	3/5 stars
Engine 145	3.5/5 stars

Rhapsody ranked the album #4 on its "Country's Best Albums of the Decade" list. "With a career that includes an awe-inspiring 50-plus No. 1 hits, plenty of George Strait's releases could have a spot on this list, but Troubadour feels like the best fit. From the Caribbean lilt of "River of Love" to the reverential "I Saw God Today" to the honky-tonkin' trucking song "Brothers of the Highway" to the carefree Western swing of "West Texas Town", Strait runs the gamut of sounds and emotions, and aces them all. One of the few artists who can achieve commercial success without courting it, Strait remains true to the honky-tonk-inspired sound he started out with decades ago."

== Track listing ==
No.	Title	Writer(s)	Duet partner(s)	Length
1.	"Troubadour"	Leslie Satcher, Monty Holmes		2:56
2.	"It Was Me"	Buddy Cannon, Randy Hardison		3:09
3.	"Brothers of the Highway"	Doug Johnson, Kim Williams, Nicole Witt		2:42
4.	"River of Love"	Billy Burnette, Dennis Morgan, Shawn Camp		3:15
5.	"House of Cash"	Satcher, Holmes	Patty Loveless	3:35
6.	"I Saw God Today"	Rodney Clawson, Wade Kirby, Monty Criswell		3:22
7.	"Give Me More Time"	Al Anderson, Dean Dillon, Scotty Emerick		3:30
8.	"When You're in Love"	Dillon, Kerry Kurt Phillips		2:49
9.	"Make Her Fall in Love with Me Song"	Satcher, Anderson		2:25
10.	"West Texas Town"	Dillon, Robert Earl Keen	Dean Dillon	2:03
11.	"House with No Doors"	Kate Coppola, Kacey Coppola, Jamey Johnson		3:44
12.	"If Heartaches Were Horses"	Buddy Brock, Wil Nance, Dillon		2:42
Total length:				36:12

== Personnel ==
As listed in the liner notes.

- George Strait – lead vocals
- Steve Nathan – Hammond B3 organ (1–5, 9), acoustic piano (6, 8, 11), synthesizers (7, 12)
- Matt Rollings – acoustic piano (1, 2, 3, 5, 9, 10, 12), Wurlitzer electric piano (4, 7), Hammond B3 organ (6, 8, 11)
- Mac McAnally – acoustic guitar
- Steve Gibson – electric guitar (1, 5, 8, 9, 12), acoustic guitar (2, 3, 4, 6, 10, 11), gut-string guitar (7)
- Brent Mason – electric guitar (1–7, 9, 10, 11), gut-string guitar (8, 12)
- Paul Franklin – steel guitar
- Stuart Duncan – fiddle (1, 2, 3, 5, 7–12), mandolin (3, 4, 6)
- Glenn Worf – bass guitar
- Eddie Bayers – drums
- Vince Gill – backing vocals (1)
- Wes Hightower – backing vocals (1)
- Thom Flora – backing vocals (2, 3, 6–10, 12)
- Marty Slayton – backing vocals (2, 3, 6–10, 12)
- Billy Burnette – backing vocals (4)
- Shawn Camp – backing vocals (4)
- Dennis Morgan – backing vocals (4)
- Patty Loveless – lead vocals (5)
- Dean Dillon – lead vocals (10)

=== Production ===
- Tony Brown – A&R direction, producer
- Brian Wright – A&R direction
- George Strait – producer
- Chuck Ainlay – recording, mixing
- Jim Cooley – recording assistant, mix assistant
- Bob Ludwig – mastering at Gateway Mastering (Portland, Maine)
- Erin McAnally – production coordinator
- Craig Allen – design, additional photography
- Donald Lesko – photography
- Erv Woolsey – management

== Charts ==
=== Weekly charts ===
Chart (2008)	Peak position
Canadian Albums (Billboard)	13
US Billboard 200	1
US Top Country Albums (Billboard)	1

=== Year-end charts ===
Chart (2008)	Position
US Billboard 200	61
US Top Country Albums (Billboard)	12

Chart (2009)	Position
US Billboard 200	92
US Top Country Albums (Billboard)	20

== Certifications ==
Certifications for Troubadour
Region	Certification	Certified units/sales
United States (RIAA)	Platinum	1,000,000^{^}
^{^} Shipments figures based on certification alone.
