= Cole Deggs & the Lonesome =

American country music band

- Origin: Nashville, Tennessee, United States
- Genres: Country
- Years active: 2006-07
- Labels: Columbia Nashville
- Members: Cole Degges; Shade Degges; Brian Hayes; David Wallace; Jimmy Wallace

Cole Deggs & the Lonesome was an American country music band from Nashville, Tennessee. The band was founded in 2006 by Cole Deggs (lead vocals), Shade Deggs (bass guitar), David Wallace (lead guitar, vocals), Jimmy Wallace (keyboards), and Brian Hayes (drums). Cole and Shade Degges are brothers from Lake Jackson, Texas, David and Jimmy Wallace (who are also brothers) are from Shreveport, Louisiana, and Hayes is a Florida native. Before the band's foundation, Cole Degges co-wrote songs for other country artists, including an album track for Kenny Chesney, as well as Tracy Byrd's 2006 single "Cheapest Motel" and Andy Griggs' 2008 single "Tattoo Rose". He also wrote Gary Allan's 2013 single "It Ain't the Whiskey".

Cole Deggs & the Lonesome signed to Columbia Records Nashville in 2007, releasing their self-titled debut album that year. The first single, "I Got More," reached number 25 on the Billboard Hot Country Songs chart. After the second single, "Girl Next Door," failed to reach the Top 40, Cole Deggs & the Lonesome were dropped by Columbia.

== Discography ==
=== Albums ===
Title	Album details	Peak chart positions	
Title	Album details	US Country	US Heat
Cole Deggs & the Lonesome	Release date: July 10, 2007; Label: Columbia Nashville	42	11

=== Singles ===
Year	Single	Peak positions	Album
Year	Single	US Country	Album
2007	"I Got More"	25	Cole Deggs & the Lonesome
2008	"Girl Next Door"	49	Cole Deggs & the Lonesome

=== Music videos ===
Year	Video
2007	"Girl Next Door"
