= Cole Deggs & the Lonesome (album) =

Cole Deggs & The Lonesome

Studio album by Cole Deggs & The Lonesome
- Released: July 10, 2007
- Genre: Country
- Label: Columbia Nashville
- Producer: Mark Wright; Rivers Rutherford

Cole Deggs & the Lonesome is the only studio album by American country music band Cole Deggs & the Lonesome. It was released on July 10, 2007 via Columbia Records. The album includes the singles "I Got More" and "Girl Next Door".

== Critical reception ==
Professional ratings
Review scores
Source	Rating
AllMusic	3.5/5 stars
Country Standard Time	negative

Thom Jurek of AllMusic said that it was "a promising first set by a band with a unique sound; they can sing, write, arrange, and play the hell out of their instruments while being uniquely themselves." Jeffrey B. Remz of Country Standard Time was less favorable, calling the band's harmonies "workmanlike" and the songwriting "predictable". He thought that the song "I Haven't Stopped Hurtin'" was the best song on the album because the band "cut loose" on it.

== Track listing ==
No.	Title	Writer(s)	Length
1.	"Girl Next Door"	Cole Deggs, Mike Geiger, Trey Matthews	3:38
2.	"I Got More"	Jim Collins, Rivers Rutherford	3:29
3.	"Out of Alabama"	Angelo Petraglia, Dave Berg, Hillary Lindsey	3:03
4.	"Twelve Ounces Deep"	Matthews, Tony Ramey	4:18
5.	"The One That Got Away"	Berg, Rutherford	3:41
6.	"Huggin' This Blacktop"	Deggs, Matthews	3:45
7.	"Makin' Nothing Out of Something"	Deggs, Matthews, Geiger	3:41
8.	"Do You Ever Think About Me"	Chris Lindsey, Aimee Mayo, Anders Osborne	4:52
9.	"Everybody's Beautiful to Someone"	Rutherford, Tom Shapiro	3:51
10.	"A Girl Like You"	Deggs, Jimmy Wallace	3:59
11.	"I Haven't Stopped Hurtin'"	Phil O'Donnell, Ronnie Rogers	3:35

== Personnel ==
=== Cole Deggs & The Lonesome ===
- Cole Deggs – lead vocals, acoustic guitar
- Shade Deggs – bass guitar, background vocals
- Brian Hayes – drums
- David Wallace – electric guitar, background vocals
- Jimmy Wallace – keyboards, Hammond organ, background vocals

=== Additional musicians ===
- Matt Chamberlain – drums
- Lisa Cochran – background vocals
- Perry Coleman – background vocals
- Eric Darken – percussion
- Kenny Greenberg – electric guitar
- Mark Hill – bass guitar
- Jim Hoke – harmonica
- Tim Lauer – accordion
- Chuck Leavell – piano, Wurlitzer electric piano, Hammond organ
- Russ Pahl – acoustic guitar, electric guitar, steel guitar
- Kim Parent – background vocals
- Rivers Rutherford – acoustic guitar, background vocals
- John Wesley Ryles – background vocals
- Russell Terrell – background vocals
- John Willis — acoustic guitar, banjo
- Christian Wojcik - background vocals

== Singles ==
Year	Single	Peak positions
Year	Single	US Country
2007	"I Got More"	25
2008	"Girl Next Door"	49
