= Shiftwork (song) =

Single by Kenny Chesney and George Strait

from the album Just Who I Am: Poets & Pirates
- Released: December 10, 2007
- Recorded: 2007
- Genre: Country
- Length: 4:29 (album version); 3:56 (single version)
- Label: BNA
- Songwriter: Troy Jones
- Producers: Buddy Cannon; Kenny Chesney

Kenny Chesney singles chronology
"Don't Blink" (2007)	"Shiftwork" (2007)	"Every Other Weekend" (2008)

George Strait singles chronology
"How 'bout Them Cowgirls" (2007)	"Shiftwork" (2007)	"I Saw God Today" (2008)

"Shiftwork" is a song written by Troy Jones and recorded by American country music artist Kenny Chesney with George Strait as a duet. It was released in December 2007 as the third single from Chesney's 2007 album, Just Who I Am: Poets & Pirates.

== History ==
Initially, "Shiftwork" first charted as an album track by receiving unsolicited airplay that brought the song up to number 42 on the country music charts before its official release to country radio. Until the song was officially released, it was credited to both Chesney and Strait. However, once it was officially released as a single, Strait's name was removed from the song because of contractual agreements between his label (MCA Nashville) and Chesney's label (BNA Records). Starting with the Billboard chart dated February 9, 2008, the song was once again billed as "Kenny Chesney duet with George Strait".

== Content ==
"Shiftwork" is a moderate up-tempo song backed by percussion (mainly steel drums). In the song, the central characters (Chesney and Strait) express their frustrations with constantly working shifts at a convenience store ("Workin' seven to three / Three to eleven / Eleven to seven"). Both characters point out that their job is "a bunch of shiftwork". In the second verse, Chesney talks about taking a trip to the beach to party "from seven to three / Three to eleven / Eleven to seven".

== Music video ==
The music video was directed by Shaun Silva and was premiered on CMT on December 6, 2007. It shows various people lip-syncing to the song.

The music video reached number 1 on CMT's Top Twenty Countdown for the week of February 28, 2008.

== Critical reception ==
The AllMusic critic Stephen Thomas Erlewine considered the song a highlight of Chesney's album, noting how Strait and Chesney both "playfully soften the F in the title, making for a genuinely funny highlight" (thus making the line sound closer to "shit work"). Brady Vercher of Engine 145 gave it a "thumbs-down" rating, writing, "What makes this a bad song is that it's dull and boring, with zero redeeming qualities. If music is supposed to make you feel something, then this song captures the monotony of 'shiftwork,' but who in their right mind is going to want to be bored when they listen to a song?" Kevin John Coyne of Country Universe, gave the song a B grade, saying that "the ’big ol’ pile of shiiiiiftwork" wordplay in the chorus is funny. It doesn't hold up much on repeated listenings, however" and that the song "still manages to become a song about getting drunk in the islands".

The song was nominated for Best Country Collaboration with Vocals at the 51st Annual Grammy Awards in 2009.

== Chart performance ==
The song originally charted at number 42 from unsolicited airplay in September 2007, shortly after Just Who I Am: Poets & Pirates was released.

Chart (2007–2008)	Peak position
US Hot Country Songs (Billboard)	2
US Billboard Hot 100	47
Canada Country (Billboard)	2
Canada Hot 100 (Billboard)	61

=== Year-end charts ===
Chart (2008)	Position
US Country Songs (Billboard)	38

== Certifications ==
Region	Certification	Certified units/sales
United States (RIAA)	Gold	500,000^{‡}
^{‡} Sales+streaming figures based on certification alone.
