= I Saw God Today =

Single by George Strait

from the album Troubadour
- Released: February 4, 2008
- Genre: Country; Christian country
- Length: 3:22
- Label: MCA Nashville
- Songwriters: Rodney Clawson; Monty Criswell; Wade Kirby
- Producers: Tony Brown; George Strait

George Strait singles chronology
"Shiftwork" (2007)	"I Saw God Today" (2008)	"Troubadour" (2008)

"I Saw God Today" is a song written by Rodney Clawson, Monty Criswell and Wade Kirby, and recorded by American country music artist George Strait. It was released in February 2008 as the lead single from his album Troubadour. The song debuted at number 19 on the Billboard Hot Country Songs chart, giving Strait the highest chart debut of his career, as well as his 43rd Billboard Number One.

"I Saw God Today" won Single of the Year at the 2008 CMA Awards.

== Content ==
The song is a ballad in which the lead character is walking down the sidewalk after his wife has just had a baby, meanwhile noticing such things as a flower growing out of a crack in the sidewalk, a couple who are expecting a baby and the colors of a sunset. Finally, the song ends with the central character in the nursery of a hospital, looking at his own newborn baby girl. He cites each thing that he sees along the way — the flower, the couple, the sunset and his newborn daughter — as examples of how he saw God that day.

According to Clawson, the idea for the song came from Criswell, who said that after unsuccessful hunting trips, he would often say that he "caught a glimpse of God today" despite not seeing any animals.

== Personnel ==
Credits are adapted from the liner notes of Troubadour.

- Eddie Bayers – drums
- Stuart Duncan – mandolin
- Thom Flora – background vocals
- Paul Franklin – steel guitar
- Steve Gibson – acoustic guitar
- Brent Mason – electric guitar
- Mac McAnally – acoustic guitar
- Steve Nathan – piano
- Matt Rollings – Hammond B-3 organ
- Marty Slayton – background vocals
- Glenn Worf – bass guitar

== Critical reception ==
Matt C., a critic for Engine 145, gave "I Saw God Today" a thumbs-up rating. He said that although it was "similar to the [songs] that countless failed nineties hat acts used to 'launch' their short careers", that Strait's vocal performance nonetheless "makes the song listenable and the country pop lyric's contrast to the country-western material that comprises much of Strait's catalog actually makes this single more memorable than some stronger songs in his hits catalog."

== Chart performance ==
Having reached number one on the Billboard Hot Country Songs charts dated for the week of May 3, 2008, "I Saw God Today" is Strait's 43rd Billboard Number One hit. Counting the Number Ones that he has had on other U.S. trade charts (Mediabase, Radio & Records before its merger with Billboard, and Gavin Report), "I Saw God Today" is Strait's 56th overall Number One hit, succeeding a record previously held by Conway Twitty for the most Number Ones by any country music artist.

Chart (2008)	Peak position
US Hot Country Songs (Billboard)	1
US Billboard Hot 100	33
US Billboard Pop 100	65
Canada Hot 100 (Billboard)	60

=== Year-end charts ===
Chart (2008)	Position
U.S. Billboard Hot Country Songs	2
Canada Country (Billboard)	8

== Certifications ==
Region	Certification	Certified units/sales
United States (RIAA)	Platinum	1,000,000^{‡}
^{‡} Sales+streaming figures based on certification alone.

== Awards ==
The song was nominated for a Dove Award for Country Recorded Song of the Year at the 40th GMA Dove Awards.
