= It Just Comes Natural (song) =

Single by George Strait

from the album It Just Comes Natural
- Released: October 9, 2006
- Recorded: 2006
- Genre: Country
- Length: 2:58
- Label: MCA Nashville
- Songwriters: Marv Green; Jim Collins
- Producers: George Strait; Tony Brown

George Strait singles chronology
"Give It Away" (2006)	"It Just Comes Natural" (2006)	"Wrapped" (2007)

"It Just Comes Natural" is a song written by Marv Green and Jim Collins, and recorded by American country music singer George Strait. It was released in October 2006 as the second single and title track from Strait's album It Just Comes Natural. The song reached the top of the Billboard Hot Country Songs chart in February 2007. The single became Strait's 42nd Billboard number-one single.

== Content ==
The song is a mid-tempo, in which the narrator discusses things that naturally happen. He goes on to say that the love he has for his significant other comes naturally.

== Personnel ==
Credits are adapted from the liner notes of It Just Comes Natural.

- Eddie Bayers – drums
- Stuart Duncan – fiddle
- Paul Franklin – steel guitar
- Steve Gibson – acoustic guitar
- Wes Hightower – background vocals
- Brent Mason – electric guitar
- Mac McAnally – acoustic guitar
- Steve Nathan – Wurlitzer electric piano
- Matt Rollings – Hammond B-3 organ
- Marty Slayton – background vocals
- Glenn Worf – bass guitar

== Chart positions ==
Chart (2006–2007)	Peak position
Canada Country (Billboard)	1
US Hot Country Songs (Billboard)	1
US Billboard Hot 100	58

=== Year-end charts ===
Chart (2007)	Position
US Country Songs (Billboard)	12

== Certifications ==
Certifications for It Just Comes Natural
Region	Certification	Certified units/sales
United States (RIAA)	Platinum	1,000,000^{‡}
^{‡} Sales+streaming figures based on certification alone.
