= How 'bout Them Cowgirls =

Single by George Strait

from the album It Just Comes Natural
- Released: August 24, 2007
- Genre: Country
- Length: 3:57
- Label: MCA Nashville
- Songwriters: Casey Beathard; Ed Hill
- Producers: George Strait; Tony Brown

George Strait singles chronology
"Wrapped" (2007)	"How 'bout Them Cowgirls" (2007)	"Shiftwork" (2007)

"How 'bout Them Cowgirls" is a song written by Casey Beathard and Ed Hill, and recorded by American country music singer George Strait. It was released in August 2007 as the fourth single from his album It Just Comes Natural. The song reached number 3 on the Billboard Hot Country Songs chart and peaked at number 49 on the U.S. Billboard Hot 100. It also peaked at number 67 on the Canadian Hot 100.

== Content ==
"How 'bout Them Cowgirls" is a mid-tempo in which the narrator states that he has been all across America and seen many things, but all he can think about and say is "how 'bout them cowgirls". The title of the song is a play on the phrase "How 'bout them Cowboys?"

== Critical reception ==
Kevin John Coyne reviewing the song for Country Universe gave the song a favorable rating stating that "what seems like a pedestrian celebration of cowgirls on the surface features several interesting layers underneath, including social commentary on female independence and the increasing urbanization of the American West."

== Chart performance ==
Chart (2007)	Peak position
US Hot Country Songs (Billboard)	3
US Billboard Hot 100	49
Canada Country (Billboard)	3
Canada Hot 100 (Billboard)	67

=== Year-end charts ===
Chart (2007)	Position
US Country Songs (Billboard)	56

== Certifications ==
Certifications for How 'bout Them Cowgirls
Region	Certification	Certified units/sales
United States (RIAA)	Platinum	1,000,000^{‡}
^{‡} Sales+streaming figures based on certification alone.
