= Just Who I Am: Poets & Pirates =

Studio album by Kenny Chesney
- Released: September 11, 2007
- Recorded: 2007
- Studios: Blackbird (Nashville, Tennessee); Emerald Sound (Nashville, Tennessee); Keith Harter Music (San Antonio, Texas); Love Shack (Nashville, Tennessee); Masterfonics (Nashville, Tennessee); Studio Without Walls (Los Angeles, California); Sound Emporium (Nashville, Tennessee); Westwood (Nashville, Tennessee)
- Genre: Country
- Length: 48:43
- Label: BNA
- Producers: Buddy Cannon and Kenny Chesney (all tracks); Joe Walsh ("Wild Ride" only)

Kenny Chesney chronology
Live: Live Those Songs Again (2006)	Just Who I Am: Poets & Pirates (2007)	Super Hits (2007)

Singles from Just Who I Am: Poets & Pirates
- 1. "Never Wanted Nothing More" Released: June 12, 2007; 2. "Don't Blink" Released: September 10, 2007; 3. "Shiftwork" Released: December 10, 2007; 4. "Better as a Memory" Released: March 31, 2008

Professional ratings
Aggregate scores
Source	Rating
Metacritic	(70/100)
Review scores
Source	Rating
Allmusic	3/5 stars
The A.V. Club	B−
Billboard	(favorable)
Blender	3/5 stars
The Boston Globe	(favorable)
Entertainment Weekly	B
Los Angeles Times	2.5/4 stars
The New York Times	(favorable)
PopMatters	7/10 stars
Rolling Stone	3/5 stars

Just Who I Am: Poets & Pirates is the eleventh studio album by American country music artist Kenny Chesney. It was released on September 11, 2007 via BNA Records. The album was leaked on the Internet on September 5, 2007. It produced four singles on the US Billboard Hot Country Songs chart between 2007 and 2008, three of which reached number one. The album also includes duets with George Strait and Joe Walsh. This is Chesney’s second album where he was not a writer or co-writer on any of the tracks, the first being 1996's Me and You.

== Content ==
The album's first two singles are "Never Wanted Nothing More" and "Don't Blink", which were officially released to country radio in June and September 2007. Both singles reached number one the Hot Country Songs charts in late 2007, as did "Better as a Memory" (the fourth and final single) in June 2008. "Shiftwork" is a duet with George Strait. It was released as the album's third single in December 2007. It peaked at number 2 in early 2008. The song "Wild Ride", a duet with Joe Walsh, was originally recorded by Dwight Yoakam on his 1993 album This Time.

== Critical reception ==
The album represented a move by Chesney to a more Gulf and Western sound with a number of "breezy, steel-drum island songs."

== Commercial performance ==
Just Who I Am: Poets & Pirates debuted at number three on the US Billboard 200 chart, selling 387,000 copies in first week. The album had the best weekly sales of any country album since the Dixie Chicks' Taking the Long Way in May 2006 As of August 2008, the album has sold 1.4 million copies in the United States. On December 10, 2007, the album was certified platinum by the Recording Industry Association of America (RIAA) for sales of over a million copies in the United States.

== Track listing ==
No.	Title	Writer(s)	Length
1.	"Never Wanted Nothing More"	Ronnie Bowman; Chris Stapleton	3:29
2.	"Don't Blink"	Casey Beathard; Chris Wallin	4:46
3.	"Shiftwork" (duet with George Strait)	Troy Jones	4:29
4.	"Just Not Today"	David Lee Murphy	4:05
5.	"Wife and Kids"	Jim Collins; Brett James	4:23
6.	"Got a Little Crazy"	Wallin; Craig Monday	4:03
7.	"Better as a Memory"	Scooter Carusoe; Lady Goodman	4:12
8.	"Dancin' for the Groceries"	James; Don Schlitz	5:11
9.	"Wild Ride" (featuring Joe Walsh)	Dwight Yoakam	4:20
10.	"Scare Me"	Wendell Mobley; Joe Don Rooney; Neil Thrasher	4:14
11.	"Demons"	Bill Anderson; Jon Randall	5:31
Total length:			48:43

== Personnel ==
As listed in liner notes.

- Wyatt Beard – background vocals
- William F. Bowman – acoustic guitar
- Bekka Bramlett – background vocals
- Mat Britain – steel drums
- Pat Buchanan – electric guitar
- Buddy Cannon – background vocals
- Melonie Cannon – background vocals
- Kenny Chesney – lead vocals
- Jeff Coffin – tenor saxophone
- Eric Darken – percussion
- Dan Dugmore – steel guitar
- Chris Dunn – trombone
- Sonny Garrish – steel guitar, Dobro
- Vince Gill – electric guitar
- Kenny Greenberg – electric guitar
- Rob Hajacos – fiddle
- Tim Hensley – background vocals
- Steve Herman – trumpet
- John Hobbs – piano, keyboards
- Jim Horn – baritone saxophone
- Paul Leim – drums, percussion
- Randy McCormick – Hammond B-3 organ, piano, keyboards, synthesizer, Wurlitzer
- Jonell Mosser – background vocals
- Larry Paxton – bass guitar, upright bass
- Gary Prim – Hammond B-3 organ, piano, keyboards
- Jon Randall – background vocals
- Mickey Raphael – harmonica
- Chris Stapleton – acoustic guitar
- George Strait – duet vocals on "Shiftwork"
- Scott Vestal – banjo
- Joe Walsh – electric guitar and talk box on "Wild Ride"
- Quentin Ware, Jr. – trumpet
- John Willis – acoustic guitar, electric guitar, talk box guitar, gut string guitar
- Andrea Zonn – background vocals

== Charts ==
=== Weekly charts ===
Chart (2007)	Peak position
Canadian Albums (Billboard)	7
US Billboard 200	3
US Top Country Albums (Billboard)	1

=== Year-end charts ===
Chart (2007)	Position
US Billboard 200	61
US Top Country Albums (Billboard)	12
Chart (2008)	Position
US Billboard 200	49
US Top Country Albums (Billboard)	9

== Certifications ==
Region	Certification	Certified units/sales
United States (RIAA)	2× Platinum	2,000,000^{‡}
^{‡} Sales+streaming figures based on certification alone.
