= Wrapped (Bruce Robison song) =

Single by George Strait

from the album It Just Comes Natural
- Released: March 19, 2007
- Genre: Country
- Length: 4:09
- Label: MCA Nashville
- Songwriter: Bruce Robison
- Producers: George Strait, Tony Brown

George Strait singles chronology
"It Just Comes Natural" (2006)	"Wrapped" (2007)	"How 'bout Them Cowgirls" (2007)

"Wrapped" is a song written by Bruce Robison. First recorded on his 1998 album Wrapped, then by Kelly Willis on her 1998 album What I Deserve, it was later covered by American country music artist George Strait on his 2006 album It Just Comes Natural. It was released on March 19, 2007 as the album's third single; Strait's version of the song reached number two on the Billboard country chart.

== Content ==
"Wrapped" is a mid-tempo where the narrator explains his inability to stop thinking about a lover who has left.

This is the second single of George Strait's career that was written and originally recorded by Bruce Robison. The first such single was Robison's "Desperately", also a cut from his album Wrapped, that Strait covered on his 2003 album Honkytonkville.

== Critical reception ==
Stephen Thomas Erlewine of AllMusic cited the song as a standout track on It Just Comes Natural, saying that the song was "laid-back" and that Strait's backing band sounded "natural" on the track.

== Charts ==
Chart (2007)	Peak position
US Hot Country Songs (Billboard)	2
US Billboard Hot 100	71
Canada Country (Billboard)	1
Canada Hot 100 (Billboard)	63

=== Year-end charts ===
Chart (2007)	Position
US Country Songs (Billboard)	21

== Certifications ==
Region	Certification	Certified units/sales
United States (RIAA)	Gold	500,000^{‡}
^{‡} Sales+streaming figures based on certification alone.

== Other versions ==
The song has been covered by the following musicians.

- Kelly Willis, on her album What I Deserve (1998)
- George Strait, on his album It Just Comes Natural (2006); released on March 19, 2007 as the album's third single; Strait's version of the song was a Top 5 country hit, reaching #2 on the Billboard country charts
- Pinmonkey, on their album Big Shiny Cars (2006)
- Catherine Britt, on her album Too Far Gone (2007)
