= Give It Away (George Strait song) =

Single by George Strait

from the album It Just Comes Natural
- Released: July 8, 2006
- Genre: Country, talking blues
- Length: 3:30
- Label: MCA Nashville
- Songwriters: Bill Anderson; Buddy Cannon; Jamey Johnson
- Producers: George Strait; Tony Brown

George Strait singles chronology
"The Seashores of Old Mexico" (2006)	"Give It Away" (2006)	"It Just Comes Natural" (2006)

"Give It Away" is a song recorded by American country music artist George Strait, written by Jamey Johnson, Bill Anderson and Buddy Cannon. It was released in July 2006 as the lead single from the album It Just Comes Natural.

The song became Strait's 41st No. 1 single on the U.S. Billboard Hot Country Songs chart, setting a new record for most No. 1 singles on that chart. Previously, Conway Twitty held that record with 40 number-one singles.

== Content ==
The song, inspired by Johnson's divorce at the time and including a recitation that was out of style in the late 2000s, is sung from the point of view of a man whose wife is leaving him. As she departs, he asks why she is not taking any of their possessions, and what he should do with them. She replies to him to each item to "give it away," because nothing in the house is worth the argument, since the two have worn themselves out arguing in the lead-up to the divorce. In the end, the man is left with all of his possessions, but a lonesome, broken heart—and he "can't even give it away."

== Cover versions ==
Co-writer Jamey Johnson and Lee Ann Womack covered the song from the television special George Strait: ACM Artist of the Decade All Star Concert.

In the 58th Annual Country Music Awards, Johnson covered the song.

== Critical reception ==
"Give It Away" is widely regarded as one of Strait's best songs. Billboard and American Songwriter both ranked the song number seven on their lists of the 10 greatest George Strait songs.

Deborah Evans Price of Billboard reviewed the song favorably, calling it "a leavin' song that would've worked in any decade."

At the Academy of Country Music awards in 2007, "Give It Away" won both the Single of the Year and Song of the Year awards; the song also won Song of the Year honors at the Country Music Association Awards the same year. "Give It Away" received a nomination for Best Male Country Vocal Performance at the 2008 Grammy Awards.

== Chart positions ==
Chart (2006)	Peak position
Canada Country (Billboard)	1
US Hot Country Songs (Billboard)	1
US Billboard Hot 100	35
US Billboard Pop 100	47

=== Year-end charts ===
Chart (2006)	Position
US Country Songs (Billboard)	14

== Certifications ==
Certifications for Give It Away
Region	Certification	Certified units/sales
United States (RIAA)	2× Platinum	2,000,000^{‡}
^{‡} Sales+streaming figures based on certification alone.
