= It Just Comes Natural =

Studio album by George Strait
- Released: October 3, 2006
- Studios: Shrimpboat Sound (Key West, Florida); Starstruck Studios, The Compound and Sound Stage Studios (Nashville, Tennessee).
- Genre: Neotraditional country; honky-tonk
- Length: 53:08
- Label: MCA Nashville
- Producers: George Strait; Tony Brown

George Strait chronology
Somewhere Down in Texas (2005)	It Just Comes Natural (2006)	Fresh Cut Christmas (2006)

Singles from It Just Comes Natural
- 1. "Give It Away" Released: July 8, 2006; 2. "It Just Comes Natural" Released: October 9, 2006; 3. "Wrapped" Released: March 19, 2007; 4. "How 'bout Them Cowgirls" Released: August 24, 2007

Professional ratings
Review scores
Source	Rating
About.com	4/5 stars
AllMusic	4/5 stars
Entertainment Weekly	B+
The Music Box	3.5/5 stars
People	4/4 stars
PopMatters	7/10 stars
Stylus Magazine	B

It Just Comes Natural is the twenty-fourth studio album by American country music singer George Strait. The album produced Strait's 41st number one Billboard Hot Country Songs hit with its lead single "Give It Away". Also released from this album were the title track (also No. 1 on Hot Country Songs), "Wrapped" (No. 2), and "How 'bout Them Cowgirls" (No. 3). The album itself has been certified platinum by the RIAA. "It Just Comes Natural" was nominated for Best Country Album at the 2008 Grammy Awards.

== Content ==
"Give It Away" is the album's first single. Released in mid-2006, this song reached number one on the Billboard country chart, becoming Strait's 41st number-one hit on that chart, and breaking Conway Twitty's record for the most Billboard number-one hits by a country music artist. Following this song was the title track, which became his 42nd number one. "Wrapped" was the third single, and finishing out the releases was "How 'Bout Them Cowgirls".

Three of the album's tracks had been previously recorded by other artists, including one of the singles. "Wrapped" was originally recorded by Bruce Robison on his 1998 album Wrapped, making it the second single of Strait's career that was written and originally recorded by Robison, the first being "Desperately" on his 2003 album Honkytonkville, which was also from the album Wrapped. "She Told Me So" was originally recorded by George Jones on his 1974 album The Grand Tour. "Texas Cookin'" was originally recorded by Guy Clark on his 1976 album of the same name.

== Track listing ==
No.	Title	Writer(s)	Length
1.	"Give It Away"	Bill Anderson, Buddy Cannon, Jamey Johnson	3:30
2.	"She Told Me So"	Bobby Braddock	3:04
3.	"That's My Kind of Woman"	Dean Dillon, Tammy Hyler	3:26
4.	"Wrapped"	Bruce Robison	4:09
5.	"It Just Comes Natural"	Marv Green, Jim Collins	2:58
6.	"He Must Have Really Hurt You Bad"	Tim Johnson	2:42
7.	"A Heart Like Hers"	Tony Martin, Mark Nesler	3:27
8.	"Why Can't I Leave Her Alone"	Trent Tomlinson, Danny Wells, Ashe Underwood, Mark Kerr	4:16
9.	"One Foot in Front of the Other"	Lee Roy Parnell, Cris Moore	4:16
10.	"I Ain't Her Cowboy Anymore"	Dillon, Scotty Emerick, Marla Cannon-Goodman	4:56
11.	"Texas Cookin'"	Guy Clark	4:25
12.	"A Better Rain"	David Lee, Tony Lane	3:39
13.	"How 'bout Them Cowgirls"	Ed Hill, Casey Beathard	3:57
14.	"What Say"	Leslie Satcher, Bobby Carmichael	3:54
15.	"Come On Joe"	Tony Romeo	3:49

== Personnel ==
As listed in liner notes.

- George Strait – lead vocals
- Steve Nathan – Hammond B3 organ (1, 2, 7, 9, 10, 12, 14, 15), Wurlitzer electric piano (3, 5), organ (4), synthesizers (6, 11, 13), acoustic piano (8)
- Matt Rollings – acoustic piano (1, 2, 4, 6, 7 9–11, 13–15), Hammond B3 organ (3, 5, 8), synthesizers (12)
- Jeff Taylor – accordion (15)
- Mac McAnally – acoustic guitar
- Steve Gibson – acoustic guitar (1, 2, 4, 5, 7, 8, 11, 12, 14), gut-string guitar (6), electric guitars (9, 10, 13, 15)
- Brent Mason – electric guitars (1–9, 11–15), gut-string guitar (10)
- Paul Franklin – steel guitar
- Stuart Duncan – fiddle, mandolin (15)
- Glenn Worf – bass guitar (1, 3–15), upright bass (2)
- Eddie Bayers – drums
- The Nashville String Machine – strings (10, 12, 13, 15)
- Bergen White – string arrangements and conductor (10, 12, 13, 15)
- Carl Gorodetzky – string contractor (10, 12, 13, 15)
- Wes Hightower – backing vocals (1–11, 13, 14, 15)
- Marty Slayton – backing vocals (4–11, 13, 14, 15)
- Tony Brown – backing vocals (11)
- The musicians (except Jeff Taylor) – backing vocals (11)

=== Production ===
- Mike Owens – A&R direction
- James Stroud – A&R direction
- Tony Brown – producer
- George Strait – producer
- Chuck Ainlay – recording, mixing
- Scott Kidd – recording assistant
- Kyle Lehning – additional recording
- Todd Tidwell – additional recording
- Casey Wood – additional recording assistant
- Jim Cooley – mix assistant
- Brian David Willis – digital editing
- Hank Williams – mastering at MasterMix (Nashville, Tennessee)
- Amy Garges – production assistant
- Craig Allen – art direction, design
- Sid Farbstein – photography
- Erv Woolsey – management

== Charts ==
=== Weekly charts ===
Chart (2006)	Peak position
US Billboard 200	3
US Top Country Albums (Billboard)	1

=== Year-end charts ===
Chart (2006)	Position
US Billboard 200	117
US Top Country Albums (Billboard)	27

Chart (2007)	Position
US Billboard 200	77
US Top Country Albums (Billboard)	15

Chart (2008)	Position
US Top Country Albums (Billboard)	75

== Certifications ==
Certifications for It Just Comes Natural
Region	Certification	Certified units/sales
United States (RIAA)	Platinum	1,000,000^{^}
^{^} Shipments figures based on certification alone.
