= Don't Blink =

Single by Kenny Chesney

from the album Just Who I Am: Poets & Pirates
- Released: September 10, 2007
- Recorded: 2007
- Genre: Country
- Length: 4:45 (album version); 4:10 (single edit)
- Label: BNA
- Songwriters: Casey Beathard; Chris Wallin
- Producers: Buddy Cannon; Kenny Chesney

Kenny Chesney singles chronology
"Never Wanted Nothing More" (2007)	"Don't Blink" (2007)	"Shiftwork" (2007)

Music video
- "Don't Blink" on YouTube

"Don't Blink" is a song written by Casey Beathard and Chris Wallin and recorded by American country music artist Kenny Chesney. It was released in September 2007 as the second single from Chesney's 2007 album Just Who I Am: Poets & Pirates. The song became Chesney's thirteenth number one hit on the U.S. Billboard Hot Country Songs chart in late 2007.

The song debuted at #16 on the U.S. Billboard Hot Country Songs chart for the week of September 8, 2007, setting a new record for the highest debut on that chart since the inception of SoundScan in 1990, beating a record set by Keith Urban's "Once in a Lifetime", which debuted at #17 in 2006. Chesney's record was broken one week later by Garth Brooks' "More Than a Memory", which debuted at number one on the country charts, the first song to do so in the chart's history.

The song also matches the fastest rising single of his career set in August 2007 with "Never Wanted Nothing More" taking eight weeks to reach number one.

On the Billboard Hot 100, "Don't Blink" debuted at number 79 on the chart dated September 22, 2007.

== Content ==
The song's lyrics tell of a younger man's encounter with a 102-year-old man who was being interviewed on the news. The interviewer wants to know the older man's "secret to life", and the older man responds with "don't blink".

== Music video ==
The music video was directed by Shaun Silva, and premiered on CMT on August 23, 2007. It features a man returning to his house where the news interview is playing on TV. He considers catching up on work, but what the old man says on TV apparently changes his mind and he decides to spend the time with his wife and son instead. Chesney performs the song outside the house, while home videos of life milestones for various people appear on the glass walls. The video was shot at the historical Farnsworth House, designed by Mies van der Rohe in the late 1940s. The house is located in Plano, Illinois, about 60 miles southwest of Chicago. The actor that was followed around the house is Chicago Actor Joel Wasserman and actress who plays his wife is Colleen Oneil

The music video reached number 1 on CMT's Top Twenty Countdown for the week of October 25, 2007.

== Critical reception ==
Kevin John Coyne of Country Universe gave the song an A+ grade, saying that this song "makes [Chesney] think about the greater truths and examine [his] own life from a new perspective."

== Chart performance ==
"Don't Blink" debuted at number 16 on the U.S. Billboard Hot Country Songs chart for the week of September 8, 2007.

Chart (2007)	Peak position
US Hot Country Songs (Billboard)	1
US Billboard Hot 100	29
US Billboard Pop 100	47
Canada Country (Billboard)	1
Canada Hot 100 (Billboard)	45

=== Year-end charts ===
Chart (2007)	Position
US Country Songs (Billboard)	39

== Certifications ==
Region	Certification	Certified units/sales
United States (RIAA)	3× Platinum	3,000,000^{‡}
^{‡} Sales+streaming figures based on certification alone.
