= 2009 in North American radio =

The following events occurred in radio in 2009.

== Events ==
- January: Michael Smerconish, morning host at talk radio WPHT Philadelphia, begins syndication of his morning show to WHFS in Washington and WOR in New York City.
- January 17: Two well known and critically acclaimed Alternative outlets, KDLD/Los Angeles, California and WHTG-FM/Eatontown, New Jersey, flip formats; KDLD to Regional Mexican (but its "Indie 103.1" format continues on the internet), WHTG to Top 40 Mainstream.
- January 20: Clear Channel Communications lays off 1,850 employees, including some of the companies' well known DJs and programmers.
- January 20: In a move related to Clear Channel's layoffs, Premiere-operated Fox Sports Radio merges programming with Los Angeles' KLAC, resulting in the dismissal of FSR personalities Andrew Siciliano, Crystal Fernandez, Craig Shemon, James Washington, Ben Maller and Karen Kay, and KLAC host Mychal Thompson. KLAC's program director Don Martin assumes like duties for FSR, replacing Andrew Ashwood, who died several months earlier. The Dan Patrick Show is also offered to FSR affiliates for the 9 a.m. - 12 p.m. EST slot, as KLAC aired it beforehand, and Premiere was managing syndication. The Petros and Money Show is syndicated on FSR from KLAC's studios, while incumbent FSR afternoon host Chris Myers is paired with the remaining two-thirds of KLAC's afternoon show, Steve Hartman and Vic "The Brick" Jacobs.
- February 2: Mark Levin's show expands from two to three hours.
- February 2: Tom Kent joins ABC Radio.
- February 10: Muzak Holdings files for Chapter 11.
- February 10: In the wake of Chris Brown's arrest on felony and assault charges by physically assaulting fellow singer Rihanna (whom he was also dating), several radio stations, including the syndicated American Top 40, announced that they will temporarily stop airing Brown's songs.
- February 17: KMVK/Dallas-Fort Worth, Texas drops Rhythmic Adult Contemporary for Spanish Hot AC. They also join KXJM/Portland, Oregon and WMVN/St. Louis in dropping the MOViN format. This flip from MOViN' would be followed the next day by WMUV/Jacksonville, who flipped to Classic Country.
- February 20: In the first of three moves affecting late night television on NBC, Conan O'Brien hosted his final episode of Late Night after 15 years, 5 months, 1 week, 1 day & 2,725 episodes, with Jimmy Fallon taking over with his version of the show beginning March 2. In turn, O'Brien will take over The Tonight Show beginning on June 1, immediately after Jay Leno hosts his final show after 17 years & 5 days on May 29. To complete the shift, on September 14, Leno will debut The Jay Leno Show. As of February 20, Leno's ''Tonight'' and O'Brien's Late Night were airing radio highlights on Westwood One. Both shows, with their new hosts, continue to air highlights on the network.
- February 20: Pioneering Talk FM outlet KLSX/Los Angeles flips to a younger targeted, Rhythmic Pop-flavored Top 40 format as "97.1 AMP Radio." All of the stations' airstaff, including Adam Carolla and Tom Leykis were terminated. The AMP Radio format, which was heard on the HD2 subcarrier of KCBS-FM, will compete against the already established Mainstream KIIS-FM and Rhythmic KPWR for listeners.
- March 1: Thom Hartmann is scheduled to move from his current syndicator, Air America Media, to Dial Global.
- March 1: KPTY/Houston, Texas drops Rhythmic contemporary and returns to its former Regional Mexican format. This move comes on February 27, just two days after parent owner Univision announced that they were eliminating 6% of their employees at their properties; the stations' airstaff, with the exception of the PD, would be among those being pink-slipped.
- March 2: Another "MOViN" station switches directions as KYMV/Salt Lake City flips to Top 40/Mainstream but keeps the moniker intact.
- March 9: WXRK in New York City drops its "K-Rock" format for contemporary hit radio "92.3 NOW FM;" though the format change was not expected until March 11; morning hosts Opie and Anthony of The Opie and Anthony Show were dropped, and furthermore CBS Radio discontinued their terrestrial syndication. Their satellite radio show will continue unaffected.
- March 17: After spending 3 decades with the CBC, 30 of them at CBC Radio One and as host of the networks' "World Report" since 1993, host Judy Maddren announces her retirement.
- March 28: Dick Bartley leaves ABC Radio and joins United Stations Radio Networks the next week.
- April 1: Hot AC KFRH/Las Vegas becomes the second station this year to adopt the Top 40 "Now" approach.
- April 2: Citadel Broadcasting announces that it has renamed ABC Radio Networks Citadel Media. The Walt Disney Company will continue to retain its ownership of ABC Radio programming however.
- April 15: KMVN/Los Angeles will become the latest "MOViN'" outlet to exit the format, as Emmis leases the station to Groupo Radio Centro, who plan to broadcast a Spanish music direction on the signal.
- April 27: Active Rock outlet WXMM/Norfolk, Virginia brings Top 40 back to the Hampton Roads-Tidewater area.
- April 28: Clear Channel announces another round of job cuts, 590 total.
- May 11: The Randi Rhodes Show is scheduled to return to radio through Premiere Radio Networks, airing on flagship WJNO as well as several Clear Channel owned progressive-talk outlets on the West Coast.
- May 15: Sheridan Broadcasting sells WAMO-AM/FM and WPGR/Pittsburgh to St. Joseph Missions for $8.9 million. All three stations will flip to religious programming after the sale closes, leaving Pittsburgh without any type of Urban or R&B outlet.
- May 18: KKSF/San Francisco drops Broadcast Architecture's satellite feed of Smooth AC for Classic Hits as "103.7 The Band."
- May 18: Tony Kornheiser steps down from his co-color commentator position on ESPN's Monday Night Football, citing his fear of flying & clearing the way for him to relaunch his radio show, The Tony Kornheiser Show. Several stations are in negotiations to bring Kornheiser to their stations.
- May 21: A day of surprise format flips as Alternative outlets KWOD/Sacramento, WMFS/Memphis, and WSWD/Cincinnati all exit the format for 90's hits (KWOD), ESPN Radio (WMFS), and Country (WSWD), respectively, while WNUA/Chicago drops Smooth AC for Spanish Contemporary.
- May 27: Microsoft announces that HD Radio features will be added to its Zune products, beginning in the Fall. This will mark the first time that a portable device will include radio stations with HD subchannel capability.
- June 1: KZMP/Dallas/Fort Worth, Texas is relaunched as an ESPN Deportes Radio affiliate. Program simulcasted on KNIT.
- June 5: Toronto, Ontario once again has a full-signal Top 40 outlet as CJAQ drops Jack FM and returns to its former format and its "Kiss FM" moniker, just one day past the sixth anniversary of its 2003 flip from "Kiss" to "Jack". The move now leaves Canada's largest radio market without an adult hits outlet, though portions of the market are served by Jack-branded WBUF in Buffalo, New York.
- June 20: The "AMP" Top 40 format crosses the border to Canada, as Alternative outlet CFUL/Calgary, Alberta becomes the first non-U.S. convert.
- July 13: A pair of outlets with longtime formats make surprise flips. WWQM/Madison, Wisconsin drops Country for Oldies, but after five days returns to Country; KDZA-FM/Colorado Springs, Colorado drops Classic Hits for Active rock, patterned after sister station KBPI/Denver.
- July 13: Best Buy becomes the first retail outlet in the United States to sell portable HD radio devices, as it offers the Insignia HD Radio Portable Player to customers.
- July 14: CBS Radio announces that it will bring Sports Talk FM to Washington, D.C. and Boston respectively, with WJFK-FM dropping their Talk format on July 20 and WBMX moving over to 104.1 so it can launch WBZ-FM at 98.5 on August 12. The latter flip also ends a 41-year run for WBCN, who will move over to WBZ-FM's HD2 subcarrier and adds to yet another casualty for the Alternative format. The loss of hot talk on WJFK also marks the end of the hot talk format on CBS stations, a process that had been in the works since 2006.
- July 14: In a 3-way deal, The New York Times-owned WQXR, Univision's WCAA and WNYC/New York City make an unusual swap/sale. Univision will move WCAA to 96.3 and pay The Times $33.5 million while WNYC gets the WQXR calls and Classical format from NYT and pay Univision $11.5 million for WCAA's 105.9 signal, which will serve as the new home for WQXR.
- July 20: American General Media doubled the Rhythmic contemporary content in Albuquerque, New Mexico by flipping Country KAGM to "Power 106" adopting a Hip-Hop lean. The company also owns similar formatted and Pop-leaning KDLW in the same market (KDLW would evolve to Top 40/CHR as "OMG! Radio" in August). AGM also brings Top 40 Mainstream back to Bakersfield, California as it flips KKXX from Adult Hits to "Hot Hits 93.1", joining Rhythmic sister station KISV.
- July 20: Satellite radio and HD Radio sharing a dubious honor with their inclusion in CNET.com's list of "The decade's 25 biggest tech flops." Satellite radio ranks 7th, HD radio 14th
- July 30: WNFN/Nashville drops Sports Talk for Top 40/CHR as "i106." This brings the number of Top 40s in the Country Music Capitol to 3, joining Mainstream rival WRVW and Mainstream-turned-Rhythmic rival WPRT-FM.
- July 31: KTNI-FM/Denver became the latest Alternative outlet to bail out of the format, first by stunting as "101.5 The Pole" playing "Stripper Music." But after a week in the format it unveiled its real format, talk radio as "101.5 The Truth," on August 7.
- August 6: College Creek Media filed a request with the FCC to take Sports KUUS, Top 40 KZUS, and Rock KEAU/Great Falls, Montana silent. All three stations debuted in December 2008 but economic difficulties became a factor in its decision.
- August 7: Laura Schlessinger announces she is jumping from Premiere Radio Networks to Talk Radio Network.
- August 7: Grand Rapids, Michigan became the latest radio market to lose an Alternative outlet when WMAX-FM flipped to Sports, bringing the number to 2 Sports FM outlets in the market, joining WBBL-FM, who flipped in May.
- August 7: CFLT-FM officially launches as "Lite 92.9" (at 92.9 FM) in Halifax, Nova Scotia, Canada. The station was previously classic country CFDR AM 780 which moved to 92.9 FM.
- August 8: CBS Radio sells its Portland, Oregon radio stations to newcomer Alpha Broadcasting.
- August 8: KHTE-FM/Little Rock drops its Rhythmic-leaning Urban format for Top 40/Mainstream but two weeks later shifted to Adult Top 40.
- August 10: Buffalo, New York gets an oldies/classic hits station again as WHTT-FM reverts to the format after 2½ years as a hot adult contemporary station.
- August 11: Mega Media, the owners of Dance outlet WNYZ-LP/New York City, files for Chapter 11 Bankruptcy.
- August 17: After spending nearly a year with a conservative Urban Contemporary/Talk approach featuring syndicated shows, KDAY/Los Angeles relaunches its Old School Hip-Hop format. The move also ends the use of "The Beat" moniker that they inherited from the former KKBT in 2008 after nearly 20 years in Los Angeles when it was first used at KKBT's former home at 92.3 in 1989.
- August 19: WSJT at 94.1 and WLLD at 98.7, both Tampa, Florida, will swap frequencies. WSJT will move to 98.7 while WLLD will take the 94.1 signal.
- August 25: CIGM-FM officially launched a CHR/Top 40 hit radio station as "Hot 93.5" at 12:00 Noon EDT, bringing back Top 40 music to Sudbury, Ontario. The station previously stunted a "Kung Pao 93.5" Chinese music format (similar to WVHT in Virginia) which was launched on August 20 after CIGM-FM began testing their new 100,000 watt FM signal on-air for the first time on August 17, 2009 at 93.5 FM with some classic rock music.
- August 26: WJZW/Washington, D.C. drops Oldies for Classic rock and adopts the moniker "The Edge."
- August 27: Sirius XM unveils the Skydock, a US$120 dock that turns iPhones into satellite radios.
- August 27: The University of Wisconsin announced that it will ban commercials featuring alcoholic beverages during their collegiate sport broadcasts on both radio and television.
- August 28: Imus in the Morning ends its television simulcast on RFD-TV, ahead of a highly anticipated (but yet to be confirmed) move to the struggling Fox Business Network. The move will become official on October 5.
- September 3: WLUE/Louisville, Kentucky drops Modern AC for 80s & 90s hits featuring all genres from those decades, billing themselves as "Gen X Radio;" it changes call letters to WLGX.
- September 4: More major format flips taking place, all in one day: WDTW-FM/Detroit drops Country for Rhythmic Hot AC as "106.7 The Beat"; KDBN/Dallas-Ft. Worth, WURV/Chattanooga and KDOG/Mankato, Minnesota drop Classic Hits, AC and Adult Hits respectively for Top 40/CHR with KDBN picking up the KLIF-FM calls and branding themselves as "i93," WURV bringing the "KISS-FM" moniker back to the Tennessee Valley after a two-year absence and KDOG returning to the format after a 10-year absence; and KQLZ/Boise switches from Classic Hits to Alternative.
- September 8: After 40 years of "You'll Give Us 22 Minutes, We'll Give You The World," All-News KFWB/Los Angeles flips to an All-Talk format. Its sister station KNX will now be the only All-News outlet in the CBS Radio Los Angeles cluster.
- September 10: The San Francisco Bay Area will see a major change on the radio dial; KNGY announced that it will flip from Dance to Top 40/CHR as KREV under new owner Royce International; Talk KNEW drops flagship host Michael Savage's The Savage Nation (leaving Savage with no flagship station) in favor of KFI-AM/Los Angeles afternoon show John and Ken; and San Jose outlets KSJO and KCNL will switch signals, with KSJO going to 104.9 and KCNL going to 92.3.
- September 11: Nielsen BDS announces that it will publish their weekly radio format charts on the website Radio-Info.com. This will be the first time since the demise of R&R in June that Nielsen BDS has allowed an independently owned website to put their charts online.
- September 14: In the fallout from his interruption of Taylor Swift's speech at the 2009 MTV Video Music Awards, several radio stations have voluntarily pulled Kanye West's songs from their library in protest.
- September 15: KFMK/Austin, Texas shifts from Rhythmic AC to Rhythmic, adopting a Hip-Hop direction as "105.9 The Beat."
- September 21: The WGBH Educational Foundation in Boston announced that it will acquire Classical outlet WCRB from Nassau Broadcasting and convert the station to a non-commercial operation, complementing sister station WGBH-FM.
- September 21: Fort Wayne, Indiana becomes the latest market to now have three Top 40s, as WGBJ drops Spanish to become "Power 102.3, Ft. Wayne's Hit Music Channel." The other two, WJFX and WNHT, are both Rhythmics.
- October 1: The Pittsburgh Penguins become the first National Hockey League team and the second ever sports franchise to broadcast on their own dedicated HD Radio channel.
- October 2: WVMV/Detroit drops Smooth AC for Top 40/CHR and adopts the "AMP" moniker.
- October 5: XHMORE/San Diego drops Rhythmic for Sports Talk, simulcasting XESPN-AM.
- October 7: CJNW/Edmonton, Alberta, Canada, signs on with a Top 40/CHR format, thus giving the city two Top 40s, the other being CHBN.
- October 8: Two New York City stations swap frequencies, as WQXR moves to 105.9, and WCAA moves to 96.3.
- October 9: WNUW/Philadelphia drops Hot AC for Sports Talk, simulcasting sister station WPEN.
- October 12: WDMK/Detroit picks up The Michael Baisden Show after being dropped from its lineup that previously aired on Mix 92.3 before being cancelled by this station and was picked up by Radio one after losing Clear Channel.
- October 14: Volvo Cars of North America announces that it will make HD Radio a standard feature on all of its US vehicles.
- October 17: WOGL in Philadelphia switches its HD2 channel to Christmas music, becoming the first station in the nation to change over to the format for the holiday season.
- October 19: Joe Scarborough's radio show loses two of its key affiliates, WMAL in Washington and KABC in Los Angeles, to be replaced by revivals of local shows, Chris Plante and Frosty, Heidi & Frank respectively. The move leaves Scarborough's show only on a few northeastern affiliates and flagship WABC.
- October 19: WWVA-FM/Atlanta drops Regional Mexican for Rhythmic AC as "The Groove @ 105.7."
- October 23: General Motors announced that it will offer Wi-Fi hotspots on its vehicles. It will only be available in its SUVs, crossovers, trucks and vans.
- October 26: WAKW/Cincinnati goes to 24/7 Christmas music, becoming the first station to drop a non-HD format for the holiday music. The date of October 26 is the earliest any station has ever made the switch, other than stunt-related changes, beating the previous known record set by KOSY-FM in Salt Lake City on October 30, 2006.
- October 29: Top 40 KDND/Sacramento, California and parent company Entercom Communications were found negligent by a 12-member jury in the January 12, 2007 water intoxication death of Jennifer Strange during KDND's "Hold Your Wee for a Wii" Contest, in which Strange was a participant. The jury awarded the Strange Family $16.57 Million in damages.
- October 29: CBS Radio announces it will begin offering several of its best-known owned-and-operated stations as superstations via HD Radio subchannels; for instance, KROQ-FM in Los Angeles will be carried to San Diego and New York City, while WFAN in New York City will be syndicated to several stations in Florida.
- October 30: KATZ-FM/St. Louis ended its decade-long run as an Urban outlet, but the format lives on as a HD2 subcarrier. The station began stunting with holiday music (starting with Halloween songs) until December 26, when they flipped to Modern AC as "100.3 The Sound." Also ending its run on the airwaves was WNYZ/New York City, who ceased operations at 5 pm (ET) after its owners failed to find financial support. JVC Media took over WNYZ's frequency on November 2 and relaunched it as simulcast of WPTY/Calverton, New York.
- November 2: A trio of Border Media Partners' Austin, Texas outlets, Regional Mexican KHHL and Spanish Contemporary simulcast KXXS/KXBT, flips formats, with KHHL going to Talk and KXXS/KXBT picking up ESPN Radio.
- November 3: Country WRDU/Raleigh, North Carolina and its Regional Mexican sister station WGBT/in nearby Greensboro announced that they will flip to Conservative Talk in January 2010.
- November 4: The Top 40/CHR format returns to Baltimore, Maryland after a long spell as WCHH drops Alternative to become "Z104.3, Baltimore's New Hit Music Channel." This comes full circle as the 104.3 frequency was home to Top 40 WBSB in the 1980s and early 1990s.
- November 5: Adult Top 40 WJLQ/Pensacola, Florida becomes the latest station to return to Top 40/CHR.
- November 9: Alternative WZJO/Charleston, West Virginia becomes the first non-AC or non-religious formatted outlet to go all Christmas this year.
- November 11: Lou Dobbs, currently a syndicated radio host on United Stations Radio Networks, quits his more prominent television job as host of CNN's Lou Dobbs Tonight and leaves the network. The radio show will continue unaffected; Dobbs is currently exploring his options.
- November 12: Citadel Media announces that it will shut down its Timeless satellite network by February 2010.
- November 17: Rhythmic contemporary KDHT/Austin pink slips its entire airstaff and drops the format after eight years. The station's frequency became the new home of sister station KGSR on November 20, while KGSR's former signal will take a Regional Mexican format after a ten-day simulcast.
- November 23: WMMS in Cleveland, Ohio cancels their top-rated afternoon-drive program The Maxwell Show after contract negotiations between the station and Maxwell (real name: Benjamin Bornstein) broke down. For nearly a month, the afternoon-drive slot is hosted by two of the sidekicks on morning show Rover's Morning Glory (Rover's producer Mike "Chocolate Charley" Toomey and call screener Shawn "Dumb" Street) before WMMS launches The Alan Cox Show. Also dismissed from the station were Maxwell's sidekicks, Tiffany "Chunk" Peck and WMMS music directory Dan Stansbury.
- November, date unknown: CRN Digital Talk Radio Networks drops most Talk Radio Network programming from its lineup, replacing the network with Air America Media.
- December 2: The syndicated morning show "The Playhouse" is dropped by Rhythmic Top 40 KXJM/Portland, Oregon, its flagship station.
- December 20: Citadel Broadcasting announces that it will file for chapter 11 bankruptcy.
- December 21: NextMedia Group also joins the growing list of broadcasting companies that have also filed for bankruptcy.
- December 26: A flurry of format flips take place, all in one day: WNWV/Cleveland drops Smooth AC after 22 years for Adult Album Alternative as "Boom 107.3" (which is quietly dropped after a few weeks due to copyright concerns and takes the "V-1073" moniker); CJEZ/Toronto also adopts the "Boom" moniker, as it flipped from AC to Classic Hits; KQLL-FM/Tulsa on the other hand, drops Classic Hits for "Gen X Radio"; WRIT-FM/Milwaukee also drops Classic Hits and returns to Oldies; KKSR/Walla Walla, Washington also returns to Oldies after spending time as an AC; and KOAS/Las Vegas drops Smooth/Urban AC for Rhythmic AC.
- December 28: KHBZ-FM/Oklahoma City drops Active Rock for Classic Rock as KBRU, "94.7 The Brew."
- December 29: Ford announces that it will become the first American auto manufacturer to offer HD radio technology with iTunes tagging capability. The added features is expected to be available as a factory installed item in its 2011 models.
- December 31: Rush Limbaugh is hospitalized with what are described as serious "chest pains" and a possible heart attack while on vacation in Hawaii.

== Debuts ==
- January: Compass Media Networks launches, taking over syndication of the Lars Larson Show in April and The Free Beer and Hot Wings Show in March.
- January: The Huckabee Report. Short-form political commentary hosted by former Governor of Arkansas Mike Huckabee and syndicated by ABC Radio.
- February 23: Jason Lewis takes his show national through Premiere Radio Networks.
- March 2: The Fred Thompson Show. Former U.S. Senator and actor Fred Thompson takes over the time slot to be vacated by Bill O'Reilly. Syndicated by Westwood One.
- April 13: Montel Williams debuts on Air America Media, replacing Lionel, who moves to morning drive the next month.
- May 31: Americana debuts on BBC Radio 4.
- June 15: America's Morning News, hosted by Melanie Morgan and featuring the staff of The Washington Times, debuts on Talk Radio Network.
- September 13: Bob Grant returns to terrestrial radio at WABC with a two-hour weekly show on Sunday afternoons. Grant had been off air since December 2008 due to a program shuffle.
- November 2: Rosie O'Donnell's live interactive talk show "Rosie Radio" debuts on Sirius XM Radio's Sirius XM Stars channel.
- December 16: WMMS in Cleveland, Ohio launches The Alan Cox Show.

== Closings ==
- February 19: Nova M Radio goes bankrupt; a new network named "On Second Thought" is formed in its place before ceasing operations a month later.
- February 20: The Adam Carolla Show and The Tom Leykis Show. Flagship station KLSX dropped the hot talk shows in a format change, leaving their affiliate bases to carry "Best Of" programming for a month.
- February 26: The Radio Factor. Bill O'Reilly left the show to focus on other projects.
- March 16: Mo'Nique's syndicated radio show is cancelled by Radio One after ten months.
- March 20: The Peter B. Collins show cancels itself after failing to secure a syndication contract.
- March 23: News and Comment (hosted by Gil Gross) and The Rest of the Story (hosted by Doug Limerick) simultaneously end their runs, to be replaced by The Huckabee Report. The move comes only three weeks after Gross and Limerick had been named permanent hosts to the two programs, which had previously been hosted by Paul Harvey. Gross and Limerick, along with Roe Conn, will continue to produce commentaries for the network, but not under the Paul Harvey franchise.
- April 15: The Theme Time Radio Hour, aired in the United States on Sirius XM Radio and in the UK on BBC Radio 2, ends its third and likely final season, as the contract between Sirius XM and host Bob Dylan expires.
- May 31: Costas on the Radio ends its run. Bob Costas left the show to focus on other projects.
- June 5: R&R publishes its final issue after 36 years, the last three as sister publication to Billboard.
- June 12: The digital television transition in the United States occurs, forcing several stations on channel 6 to shut down their automatic FM simulcasts on 87.7 MHz. WRGB's attempt at a workaround was denied.
- July 4: Casey Kasem officially retires as the final episodes of his two first-run shows, "American Top 20" and "American Top 10", are released to stations.
- July 14: The Mike O'Meara Show, formerly the Don and Mike Show, is discontinued after CBS changes formats at the show's flagship station.
- July 27: CFDR AM 780 in Halifax, Nova Scotia, Canada signs off the air for good then moves to the FM dial.
- August 14: Tammy Bruce ends her terrestrial radio show and goes to Internet only, due to a lack of stations carrying the show.
- August 24: After 32 years on the air with country music, AM 790 CIGM in Sudbury, Ontario signed off at midnight August 24 and simulcasted the "Kung Pao 93.5" Chinese music stunt format then currently "Hot 93.5" which was launched on August 25. CIGM, (formerly CKSO) will be shutting down their old 50,000 watt AM transmitter by the end of 2009, ending nearly 75 years of AM radio broadcasting in Sudbury, being the last AM radio outlet in the city.
- September 30: GAC Nights: Live from Nashville is canceled by Citadel Media. The show's producers are seeking a new distributor.
- September 30: in Sudbury, Ontario, Canada, CIGM ends its simulcast of hot 93.5 by turning of its AM 790 transmitter ending nearly 75 years of AM radio broadcasting in Sudbury, being the last AM radio station outlet in the city.
- October 30: The Pulse 87 format shuts down as Island Broadcasting revoked Pulse 87's lease on TV station WNYZ-LP, the audio feed of which Pulse 87 uses to broadcast on radios.
- November 13: GSN Radio broadcasts its final show.
- November 30: Curtis Sliwa leaves WABC in New York City, clearing the way for John Batchelor's newsmagazine to be broadcast seven days a week. Sliwa is slated to join WNYM.
- December 26: The final episode of The Jeff Foxworthy Countdown is issued to stations after Premiere Radio Networks canceled the show in November.
- December 31: Westwood One drops the simulcast of Larry King Live. The move ends Larry King's continuous run of 31 years on the network and its predecessor, the Mutual Broadcasting System.

== Deaths ==
- Barney Cannon, 53. Program director at KWKH in Shreveport, Louisiana. Died April 19.
- Walter Cronkite, 92. Former host at WKY and KCMO in the 1930s; most recently heard on radio as the announcer for radio simulcasts of the CBS Evening News. Died July 17.
- Monte Clark, 72. Former color analyst and broadcaster for the Michigan Wolverines and Michigan State Spartans football teams. Died September 16.
- Fred Cusick, 90. Boston Bruins play-by-play announcer. Died September 15.
- Bill Frindall, 69. English sportscaster and statistician. Died January 29.
- Larry Glick, 87. Overnight radio host at WBZ in Boston from 1968 to 1986. Died March 26.
- Paul Harvey, 90. Influential American commentator who hosted The Rest of the Story and News and Comment for 58 years. Died February 28.
- Irv Homer, 75. Philadelphia area talk radio host from 1975 to 2007. Died June 24.
- Fred Honsberger, 58. Talk radio host on KDKA in Pittsburgh. Died December 16.
- Michael Jackson, 50. Worldwide famous singer, dancer, and actor whose Thriller album was the biggest-selling album of all time. Died June 25 of a drug-related cardiac arrest. As the result of his death, most radio stations in the United States played tributes to Jackson and his music.
- Harry Kalas, 73. Play-by-play announcer for the Philadelphia Phillies from 1971 until the day before his death, as well as for the NFL on Westwood One and NFL Films. Died April 13.
- George Kell, 86, Detroit Tigers play-by-play announcer from 1959 to 1996, died March 24.
- Les Lye, 84. Canadian TV/radio actor and broadcaster, July 22.
- Ed McCarthy. Anchor on CNN Radio, died July 9.
- Ed McMahon, 86. Host of the NBC program Monitor and, at the time of his death, the weekly talk show Lifestyles, as well as several television shows. Died June 23.
- George Michael, 70. Disc jockey at WABC New York, later sportscaster of Sports Machine fame. Died December 24.
- George Neher, 65. Morning radio host at WTNY in Watertown, New York from 1964 to 2009; found dead August 25.
- Erika Roman, 33. Radio personality with WPYO/Orlando, Florida and promoter for Fever Records; car crash, May 1.
- Soupy Sales, 83. Midday jock at WNBC in New York City during the Don Imus/Howard Stern era. Died October 22.
- Ed Schwartz, 62. Longtime Chicago late-night radio host; died February 4.
- Ron Silver, 62. Actor, director, producer and political activist; was midday host on SiriusXM's P.O.T.U.S channel. Died March 15.
- Percy Sutton, 89. Founder of Inner City Broadcasting Corporation; died December 27.
- George Weber, 48. Newsman for ABC Radio; stabbed to death March 20.
