= List of 2010s Super Bowl commercials =

This is a list of Super Bowl commercials that played during the 2010s. This article does not list advertisements for a local region or station (e.g. promoting local news shows), pre-kickoff and post-game commercials/sponsors, or in-game advertising sponsors and television bumpers.

== 2010 (XLIV) ==
Product type	Product/title	Plot/notes
Beer	Bud Light "Beer House"	Several people meet a man whose house is made out of Bud Light cans. He says that some of the cans are not empty, and the people start to rush and take the house apart.
Beer	Bud Light "Meteor"	When scientists see a meteor flying towards earth, they decide to party with Bud Light. The meteor turns out to be a rock, and they still party.
Beer	Bud Light "T-Pain Voice"	Men who hear about a Bud Light party talk like T-Pain. Soon, T-Pain shows up at the party.
Beer	Budweiser "Friends"	A Clydesdale and a calf are friends at a young age, though a fence separates them. Three years later, the two are reunited and the bull bursts through the fence to his friend.
Beer	Budweiser "Human Bridge"	When the bridge is out in a small town, the population form a human bridge so that a Budweiser truck can cross into town.
Candy	Snickers "Betty White"	Betty White is playing football and keeps getting tackled. A woman gives her a Snickers bar and says, "Try this". White turns back into a man. Abe Vigoda is then seen being tackled, to which he responds, "That hurt." It was nominated for an Emmy.
Car	Dodge Charger "Woman Are Shrill"	Men go over the rules of life which they hate. The final man thinks, "And because I do this, I will drive the car I want to drive." Narrated by Michael C. Hall.
Car	Hyundai "Creation"	We see a Hyundai being made
Car	Hyundai "2020"	A parody of Brett Favre's anonymous retirement, showing him getting an MVP Award in 2020.
Car	Kia Motors "How You Like Me Now"	A teddy bear, a sock monkey, a robot, Muno from Yo Gabba Gabba!, and another toy are all living their PG-13 dreams while driving a Kia Sorento.
Car	Volkswagen "Punch Dub Days"	The first of their Punch Dub Days campaign features many people, including Stevie Wonder and Tracy Morgan, punching someone in the arm.
Clothing	Dockers "Men Without Pants"	A group of men, walk thorough a field in their underwear, singing "I Wear No Pants" by Poxy Boggards.
Directory assistance	kgb "Sumo"	Two guys, one named Paul and the other named Mike, are given a task; to find out what "I surrender" means in Japanese. Paul uses the web to search for this answer, while Mike texts kgb. During all of this a sumo wrestler is standing next to them, poised to take on both men at any moment. Mike quickly gets a response back from kgb. He is able to give the correct answer to the wrestler, bow, and quickly leave. While Paul on the other hand, responds to the sumo wrestler incorrectly, by saying "Bring it on fat man" in Japanese. This angers the wrestler and causes him to come charging towards Paul. The ad ends with the man sitting on top of Paul.
Electronics	FLO TV "Injury Report"	Jim Nantz does an injury report on a man who "lost his spine" from missing out on watching live sports, due to shopping at the mall with his girlfriend.
Film	The Back-Up Plan	Movie promos
Film	Clash of the Titans	Movie promos
Film	How to Train Your Dragon	Movie promos
Film	Iron Man 2	Movie promos
Film	The Last Airbender	Movie promos
Film	Prince of Persia: The Sands of Time	Movie promos
Film	Robin Hood	Movie promos
Film	Shutter Island	Movie promos
Film	Toy Story 3	Movie promos
Film	Tron: Legacy	Movie promos
Film	The Wolfman	Movie promos
Food	Doritos "Boyfriend"	A man is seen staring at a woman's butt as she walks into the other room. He then tries to start a conversation with the girlfriend's kid. When he reaches for a Dorito, the kid slaps him, saying, "Keep your hands off my Mama, keep your hands off my Doritos."
Food	Doritos "Dog"	A dog wants Doritos from a man sitting on a bench. The man says it'll have to speak, but it is wearing an anti-bark collar. The dog comes back, and attaches the collar to the man, who lies on the ground, speaking gibberish. The dog walks away with the bag of Doritos.
Food	Doritos "Funeral"	A man who recently faked his death is in his coffin, watching the Super Bowl and in a pool of Doritos. The casket flies open, and another man, right in front of him, gets up and screams, "It's a miracle!"
Food	Doritos "Tim"	At a gym, a man has stolen Doritos out of Tim's locker. His friend tries to warn him, but Tim transforms into a Dorito-wearing ninja.
Manufacturing	Bridgestone "Killer Whale"	Three men have a killer whale in their small van. They then release it into the sea. One guy says, "Best bachelor party ever!"
Mobile phone	Boost Mobile "Shuffle"	Celebrating the 25th anniversary of The Super Bowl Shuffle, the 1985 Chicago Bears do the Shuffle
Restaurant	McDonald's "Check This"	In a 2010 NBA interpretation of the 1993 Showdown commercial, NBA stars Dwight Howard and LeBron James play a slam dunk version of H-O-R-S-E, with the same prize as before. Larry Bird, who stated "no dunking" in the original Showdown with Michael Jordan, cashes in by eating the Big Mac and fries prize after Howard shatters the backboard.
Restaurant	Taco Bell "It Rocks"	Charles Barkley promotes the $5 Box by performing a musical number
Shoes	Skechers "Shape-Ups"	Three people, including Joe Montana, talk about how great Shape-Ups are
Soft drink	Coca-Cola "Africa"	A sleepwalking man walks in a forest of Africa, eventually reaching a refrigerator with a Coke bottle
Soft drink	Coca-Cola "The Simpsons"	Mr. Burns goes bankrupt and loses everything. While in a walk in the park, he sees people enjoying his things and Coke bottles. Apu notices that Burns is sad, and gives him a Coke since he was carrying two armfuls of Coke. Milhouse is standing in a makeshift kite and bumps into the Coca-Cola logo. He says "Ah Sorry Coke!" while the theme tune plays.
TV show	Late Show with David Letterman	David Letterman, Oprah Winfrey, and Jay Leno are watching the Super Bowl
TV show	NFL Full Contact	On Groundhog Day, the mayor pulls out Troy Polamalu (who was the size of a groundhog) and has seen his shadow. The mayor declares six more weeks of football.
Video game	Dante's Inferno	Cinematic trailer for the game, Dante's Inferno accompanied by Bill Withers' song, "Ain't No Sunshine".
Website	Cars.com "Smart Kid #2"	A brand-new "Smart Kid" ad for cars.com
Website	E*Trade "Date"	A date between two web babies goes awry
Website	Focus on the Family.com "Miracle Baby"	Pam Tebow talks about her miracle baby Tim Tebow. The ad drew much criticism from pro-choice groups.
Website	GoDaddy "Massage"	Danica Patrick gets a massage. The massage therapist realizes that she's the GoDaddy spokeswoman. Then he then tries to impress Danica by opening her blouse.
Website	Google "Searching"	An anonymous user (most likely a man) is using Google for help by using its search engine. Over the course, it tells a story about how the user goes to Paris for college, meets a French woman, falls in love, buys her chocolate, gets married, and has a child.
Website	Monster.com "Talented Beaver"	A beaver that plays the fiddle becomes a big hit

== 2011 (XLV) ==
Product type	Product/title	Plot/notes
Beer	Bud Light "Hack Job"	A couple appears on a home makeover show called "Hack Job", discovering the only thing they have done to their kitchen was put a bucket of Bud Light on the counter.
Car	Audi "Old Luxury"	Two people escape from a fancy prison. Cameos: Kenny G
Car	Chevrolet "Bumblebee"	Depicts a fake local commercial for a dealership named Al's Chevrolet and its Super Xtravaganza Sale. The lot owner catches a football, and the mascot starts smashing a yellow Chevrolet car with a mallet. Suddenly, the car reconfigures itself into the Transformer Bumblebee. Onlookers run away in fear. The Autobot picks up the mascot and hurls him off into the distance. He then transforms back into the Chevy and starts driving away.
Car	Chevrolet "Elderly Home"	People in an elderly home try to figure out a Chevy commercial.
Car	Chevrolet "Glee"	In a fake recap of the FOX series "Glee," coach Sue Sylvester (Jane Lynch) tells the William McKinley Glee Club that Chevrolet wants to feature them in a commercial for the Chevy Cruze and give them all free cars. The entire club starts shrieking with excitement. However, the narrator says that Sue left out the fact that doing the commercial would disqualify them from ever competing again. Rachel Berry (Lea Michele) leads the glee club in a rendition of the classic jingle "See the USA in Your Chevrolet." The number takes place on a sound stage colored white and decorated with several Chevy Cruze vehicles. It features highly choreographed dancing and confetti. After the performance is complete, the scene cuts back to the glee club music room after Sue told the club about the commercial offer. Rachel points out that appearing in the commercial would revoke the club's amateur status and make them ineligible for competition. Sue curses the club before storming out. Glee member Brittany Pierce (Heather Morris) says she was going to donate her Chevy Cruze to charity, but then clarifies that Charity is her cat.
Car	Chevrolet "Miss Evelyn"	Two guys narrate their idea for a Chevy Camaro commercial.
Car	Chevrolet "Tommy"	In the spirit of Lassie, a Chevrolet Silverado HD drives up to a man's rural house honking wildly and informing him of the dangerous locations in which his son Tommy has gotten trapped. These include a well, a cave, a hot air balloon, the belly of a whale and a volcano. The father is able to save Tommy every time with the help of the Chevy.
Car	Chrysler 200 "Born of Fire"	A narrator talks about how Detroit has its history, but it should be respected like any other town. Rapper Eminem is driving through Detroit in his Chrysler, until he reaches the Fox Theatre. He concludes that, "This is the Motor City, and this is what we do." The song "Lose Yourself" by said artist is playing throughout the commercial. The commercial is two minutes long, and one of the longest commercials in Super Bowl history. The ad received critical acclaim.
Car	Ford "Race"	Six people prepare to race in their Fords
Car	Mercedes-Benz "Welcome"	Mercedes-Benz cars from all across the globe start up and drive off on their own power. The vehicles all arrive at the same spot, a Mercedes dealership, where the latest models are revealed. Sean "Diddy" Combs appears in the ad as one of the owners who notices their Mercedes driving off.
Car	Mini "Cram It In The Boot"	On a game show, a contestant has to "Cram It In The Boot", by placing as many large items into a Mini Countryman
Car	Volkswagen "Black Beetle"	A computer-generated black beetle runs fast, referencing the new Volkswagen model
Car	Volkswagen "The Force"	A kid dressed as Darth Vader tries the Force on random objects, but fails. When his father comes home in his Volkswagen, the kid tries to use the Force to start the engine. He succeeds, or so he thinks. The ad was voted No. 9 on YouTube's Top 10 Videos of 2011.
Film	Captain America: The First Avenger	Movie promos
Film	Cowboys & Aliens	Movie promos
Film	Fast Five	Movie promos
Film	Kung Fu Panda 2	Movie promos
Film	Limitless	Movie promos
Film	Pirates of the Caribbean: On Stranger Tides	Movie promos
Film	Rio	Movie promos
Film	Thor	Movie promos
Film	Transformers: Dark of the Moon	Movie promos
Food	Doritos "Love"	A man goes around the office with a creepy obsession for Doritos
Food	Doritos "Teasing"	A boyfriend teases his girlfriend's dog by waving Doritos around from the inside of a glass door. Instead of the dog running into the door, the dog crashes through the door, squishing the man.
Soft drink	Brisk "Eminem"	Eminem (in stop-motion form) tells the viewer why he doesn't appear in commercials. His requirements for appearing in an advertisement are for attractive women to appear, the ad to be filmed at his house, and for him to record the songs in the ad by himself. He follows that up by telling the viewer that once it's time to record the commercial, he ends up hating the product and the commercial is shelved. After all that, he then is handed a can of Brisk, declares his approval of the beverage and adds a new demand for appearing in an advertisement, changing the name of the drink. However, an executive steps in and tells Eminem that the name change demand is not possible. Eminem replies by shoving the executive off the building they are on top of (in the shape of a Brisk can) and reiterates by telling the viewer why he doesn't appear in commercials.
Soft drink	Pepsi Max "Love Hurts"	A wife keeps putting down her husband's spirits. When the husband thinks his wife will be mad that he is drinking Pepsi Max, she too is drinking Pepsi Max. When the man then spots a hot jogger, the woman accidentally knocks out the woman with her can.
Store	Best Buy "Upgrades"	Ozzy Osbourne tries to shoot a Best Buy commercial for 4G phones, but the G keeps getting upgraded. Pretty soon, Osbourne is replaced by Justin Bieber. Cast: Ozzy Osbourne, Justin Bieber, Sharon Osbourne, Jack Osbourne
Wireless	Verizon "I Can Hear You Now"	The Verizon Test Guy (Paul Marcarelli) answers an Apple iPhone 4 phone and tells the caller "Yes, I Can Hear You Now".

- BMW
- Bridgestone (2)
- Bud Light (2)
- Budweiser (2)
- CareerBuilder
- CarMax (2)
- Cars.com (2)
- Coca-Cola (2)
- Doritos (3)
- E*Trade
- GoDaddy
- HomeAway
- Hyundai
- Kia
- Mercedes-Benz
- PepsiMax (3)
- Skechers- "Kim Kardashian"
- Snickers
- Stella Artois
- Teleflora- "Faith Hill"

== 2012 (XLVI) ==
Product type	Product/title	Plot/notes
Beer	Bud Light "Factory"	A factory is working on the new Bud Light Platinum
Beer	Budweiser "The End of Prohibition"	The reactions of a town at the end of Prohibition are shown.
Beer	Budweiser "Eternal Optimism"	Various moments in 20th Century history are shown, all accompanied by people drinking Budweiser.
Candy	M&M's "Just My Shell"	At a party, a brown-shelled M&M is mistaken for being naked. As a result, the red M&M tears off its skin and dances to "Sexy and I Know It" by LMFAO.
Car	Audi "Vampire Party"	A group of vampires are having a party in the woods. The vampire in charge of drinks (blood types) arrives in his Audi. The bright lights of the car kills all of the vampires, with him wondering where everyone went afterwards. Soundtrack: "The Killing Moon" by Echo and the Bunnymen
Car	Cadillac "Green Hell"	Showcases the Cadillac ATS being developed and tested at the Nürburgring racetrack in Germany
Car	Chrysler "Halftime in America"	Clint Eastwood recounts how the automotive industry survived the Great Recession
Car	Fiat "Seduction"	A man walks through a street to discover a beautiful woman (Catrinel Menghia) standing on a parking space, who proceeds to approach and seduce him, when successfully doing so he then discovered he was about to kiss a Fiat 500 Abarth. Cast: Catrinel Menghia
Car	Hyundai "Cheetah"	Two men try to see which is faster: a cheetah or a Hyundai. Once the cheetah is released, it starts to instead chase after its cage handler.
Film	Act of Valor	Movie promos
Film	The Amazing Spider-Man	Movie promos
Film	The Avengers	Movie promos
Film	Battleship	Movie promos
Film	Brave	Movie promos
Film	The Dark Knight Rises	Movie promos
Film	The Hunger Games	Movie promos
Film	Ice Age: Continental Drift	Movie promos
Film	John Carter	Movie promos
Film	The Lorax	Movie promos
Film	Madagascar 3: Europe's Most Wanted	Movie promos
Film	Ted	Movie promos
Soft drink	Pepsi "The King's Court"	People in the Middles Ages try to entertain their king (Elton John) for a Pepsi. While the first person fails, a mysterious person (Season 1 X Factor winner Melanie Amaro) wins the Pepsi by singing Aretha Franklin's "Respect"." After she wins, she overthrows the king and gives Pepsi to all the town. Cast: Elton John, Melanie Amaro, Flavor Flav
Store	Best Buy "Phone Innovators"	An ad featuring the creators of the cameraphone, Siri, Shazam, and the first text message. The creators of Words with Friends also appear parodying the incident involving Alec Baldwin playing the game on an airplane.

- Pete Hoekstra

== 2013 (XLVII) ==
Product type	Product/title	Plot/notes
Beer	Beck's Sapphire "Serenade"	A CGI fish swims around a bottle of Beck's Sapphire, singing Chet Faker's cover of No Diggity by Blackstreet.
Beverage mix	MiO "Anthem"	Tracy Morgan gives a Patton inspired speech about how change keeps the United States moving forward
Car	Audi "Prom"	A guy getting ready for a prom drives his mom's Audi there
Film	Fast and Furious 6	Movie promos
Film	G.I. Joe: Retaliation	Movie promos
Film	Iron Man 3	Movie promos
Film	Oblivion	Movie promos
Film	Oz the Great and Powerful	Movie promos
Film	Star Trek Into Darkness	Movie promos
Food	Wonderful Pistachios	Psy does his "Gangnam Style" dance to promote pistachios
Food	Doritos "Time Machine," "Cowboy Kid"	A child scams a neighbor into giving him his bag of Doritos, by claiming he had built a time machine powered by them.
Food	Doritos "Time Machine," "Cowboy Kid"	A young boy dressed as a cowboy races his sarcastic older brother to a bag of Doritos, with the help of his dog and lasso the cowboy kid gets the Doritos and hogtied his brother.
Restaurant	Subway "15 Years in the Making"	Brian Baumgartner and several sporting stars, retell the story of how Jared Fogle lost weight by eating Subway subs and kept the weight off, 15 years later. Sports figures featured in the ad: Laila Ali, Carl Edwards, Jay Glazer, Blake Griffin, Robert Griffin III, Ryan Howard, Mike Lee, Eric LeGrand, Apolo Ohno, Ndamukong Suh, and Justin Tuck
Shoes	Skechers "The Chase"	A man chases down a cheetah, ties it in a knot and prevents it from hunting down a gazelle, thanks to the Skechers GOrun 2 shoes he is wearing.
Truck	Dodge Ram "So God Made a Farmer"	Portions of a speech by Paul Harvey are played over a background of farming activities in the United States

== 2014 (XLVIII) ==
Product type	Product/title	Plot/notes
Beer	Budweiser "Puppy Love"	
Car	Audi "Doberhuahua"	
Car	Kia "The Truth"	Morpheus offers a couple of choice of a red key or a blue key (with the red key being a Kia K900). As they drive on the Kia, Morpheus accompanies them while singing to "Nessun Dorma" as nods to The Matrix trilogy start flying in to the scene.
Car	Volkswagen "Wings"	Every time a VW hits 100,000 miles, a German engineer gets their wings
Car accessories	WeatherTech "You Can't Do That	
Film	The Amazing Spider-Man 2	Movie promos
Film	Captain America: The Winter Soldier	Movie promos
Film	Divergent	Movie promos
Film	Draft Day	Movie promos
Film	Edge of Tomorrow	Movie promos
Film	Guardians of the Galaxy	Movie promos
Film	How to Train Your Dragon 2	Movie promos
Film	The Lego Movie	Movie promos
Film	Maleficent	Movie promos
Film	The Monuments Men	Movie promos
Film	Muppets Most Wanted	Movie promos
Film	Need for Speed	Movie promos
Film	Neighbors	Movie promos
Film	Noah	Movie promos
Film	Pompeii	Movie promos
Film	RoboCop	Movie promos
Film	Transformers: Age of Extinction	Movie promos
Film	X-Men: Days of Future Past	Movie promos
Soft drink	Coca-Cola "It's Beautiful"	Themed around multiculturalism, the ad showed scenes depicting scenes of Americans of various ethnicities, including a same-sex couple, the first depicted in a Super Bowl ad; set to the rendition of the patriotic hymn America the Beautiful sung in different languages. Upon its release, the commercial was controversial. The ad later re-aired at Super Bowl LI.
Store	RadioShack "The '80s Called"	A RadioShack store is cleared out by several 1980s pop culture icons

== 2015 (XLIX) ==
Product type	Advertiser/Product	Title	Plot/notes
Adhesives	Loctite	"Positive Feelings"	People dancing with Loctite fanny packs
Antifungal medication	Jublia	"Tackle It"	Antifungal topical
Beer	Budweiser	"Lost Dog"	A little yellow Labrador gets lost and finds his way home
Beer	Bud Light	"Coin"	As part of the beer's ongoing "Up for Whatever" campaign, a randomly-chosen person plays a life-sized version of Pac-Man.
Candy	Skittles	"It Will be Settled"	A town settles their disputes with arm wrestling contests
Candy	Snickers	"The Brady Bunch"	In The Brady Bunch episode, a hungry Marcia (Danny Trejo) is stressing out and "her" parents settle her down with a Snickers bar.
Car	BMW	"Newfangled Idea"	No one knew how big the Internet would become, as shown in a 1994 clip of Today show hosts Katie Couric and Bryant Gumbel. 21 years later, the two are in an all-electric BMW i3, which is made in a wind-powered factory.
Car	Chevrolet	"Super Bowl Blackout"	The screen goes blank and then asks what if you lost TV service and your screen went black as the game started, and that its latest vehicle has Wi-Fi ability.
Car	Dodge	"Wisdom"	Centenarians give advice about life, as the car company celebrates its 100th anniversary.
Car	Fiat	"The Fiat Blue Pill"	A husband loses his blue pill, which bounces around town until it lands in a Fiat 500, turning the car into a Fiat 500X.
Car	Jeep	"Beautiful Lands"	Advertisement for the Jeep Renegade, done to the song "This Land Is Your Land", and applied to lands all over the world.
Car	Lexus	"Let's Play"	A miniature model of the Lexus RC 350 shows off some drift parking techniques, followed by a full-size model.
Car	Kia Motors	"The Perfect Getaway"	Pierce Brosnan is pitched a movie role where he drives a Kia Sorento up a snow-covered mountain road but instead of action-adventure mission with snipers, tanks, and explosions, he encounters animals and safe drive.
Car	Mercedes-Benz	"Fable"	A retelling of The Tortoise and the Hare where the tortoise drives a Mercedes-AMG GT
Car	Nissan	"With Dad"	In the ad, a race car driver balances his work life and his family. It is the first public appearance of a Nissan GT-R LM Nismo.
Car	Toyota	"How Great I Am"	Footage of Paralympian snowboarder and Dancing with the Stars competitor Amy Purdy juxtaposed with an audio promo by Muhammad Ali
Car	Toyota	"My Bold Dad"	The aspects of being a dad
Car accessories	WeatherTech	"America At Work"	The American company makes car floor mats
Credit card	Discover Card	"Surprise"	A guy contacts his service representative when he learns that he can get his credit score, which is good because he does not like surprises. He then opens the door and sees a screaming goat in his apartment.
Feminine care products	Always	"Like a Girl"	A new look at the phrase of doing things "like a girl"
Film	Avengers: Age of Ultron		Movie promo
Film	The Divergent Series: Insurgent		Movie promo
Film	Fifty Shades of Grey		Movie promo
Film	Furious 7		Movie promo
Film	Home		Movie promo
Film	Inside Out		Movie promo
Film	Jurassic World		Movie promo
Film	Kingsman: The Secret Service		Movie promo
Film	Minions	"Super Fans"	Movie promo, the Minions are shown enjoying the Super Bowl in their own way
Film	Pitch Perfect 2		Movie promo
Film	The SpongeBob Movie: Sponge Out of Water		Movie promo
Film	Ted 2		Movie promo, Tom Brady is featured in the movie
Film	Terminator Genisys		Movie promo
Film	Tomorrowland		Movie promo
Food	Avocados From Mexico	"First Draft Ever"	Doug Flutie and Jerry Rice provide color commentary on the first ever draft over animals and plants
Food	Doritos	"Middle Seat"	An airline passenger tries not to let the seat next to him be occupied. / Winner in the Doritos "Crash the Super Bowl" contest.
Food	Doritos	"When Pigs Fly"	A boy creates a contraption that allows pigs to fly so he can get some Doritos. / Runner-up in the Doritos "Crash the Super Bowl" contest.
Food	McDonald's	"Pay With Lovin'"	A McDonald's restaurant accepts alternatives to money such as compliments, silly dances, and calling mom.
Gaming	Clash of Clans	"Revenge"	Liam Neeson plans to avenge his loss in the game
Gaming	Game of War: Fire Age	"Who I Am"	Kate Upton's character leads her troops against an invading army
Insurance	Esurance	"Sorta Pharmacy"	A woman gets service by "Sorta Greg" (Bryan Cranston), an eccentric pharmacist
Insurance	Esurance	"Sorta Your Mom"	A student is picked up from school by a badly-driving woman who claims to be "sorta your mom" (Lindsay Lohan)
Insurance	Nationwide	"Boy"	A boy talks about not being able to do things like ride a bike or other childhood activities because he died in an accident.
Insurance	Nationwide	"Invisible Mindy"	Mindy Kaling concludes that based on how she's been treated by insurance companies, she might actually be invisible
Lingerie	Victoria's Secret		Footage of model shoots from the past 18 months
Phone	Sprint	"Super Apology"	A caption-styled ad with curse words changed with pictures of the screaming goat and a donkey
Phone	T-Mobile	"#KimsDataStash"	Kim Kardashian asks viewers to help save the data from cell phone service packages so that she can be seen in action.
Phone	T-Mobile	"One Upped"	Chelsea Handler and Sarah Silverman try to one-up each other when they use Wi-Fi calling
Phone accessory	Mophie	"All-Powerless"	Weird things happen around the world because God's smartphone battery runs out
Service	No More	"30 Second"	A woman places a call to 911 pretending to order a pizza but is actually calling for help from domestic abuse
Service	Weight Watchers	"All You Can Eat"	After being inundated with food ads, it is time to make plans
Shoes	Skechers	"Hall"	Pete Rose talks about being in the Hall and walking in his Skechers shoes. It turns out the Hall is in his own house and he even is not supposed to be in there.
Skincare products	Dove+Men	"Real Strength"	Video clips of kids of various ages calling out for their dads
Soft drink	Coca-Cola	"Make It Happy"	A spill of the drink in a data center causes Internet bullying messages to transform into positive messages
Software	TurboTax	"Boston Tea Party"	The British work a deal to call off the American Revolution by saying that filing taxes will be free
Technology	Microsoft	"Braylon O'Neill"	A boy with two prosthetic legs is able to play sports and have a life
Travel	Carnival	"Come Back to the Sea"	A voiceover of JFK giving a speech about coming from the sea while a video slideshow of cruise ships plays
Website	Wix.com	"It's That Easy"	Five former NFL stars start new careers with the help of website builder Wix.com
Website	GoDaddy.com	"Working"	A guy misses the Super Bowl party so he can work on his e-business
Website	Squarespace	"Om"	Jeff Bridges hums "Om" next to a sleeping couple, and advertises his website which he built with Squarespace

== 2016 (L) ==
Product type	Advertiser/Product	Title	Plot/notes
Beer	Bud Light	"Bud Light Party"	Amy Schumer and Seth Rogen form a political party
Beer	Budweiser	"#GiveADamn"	Helen Mirren delivers a public service announcement against drunk driving
Beer	Michelob Ultra	"Breathe"	Athletes of various disciplines are shown catching their breath after workouts, culminating in the reveal of a bottle of Michelob Ultra as a lower-calorie beer alternative
Beer	Shock Top	"Unfiltered Talk"	Comedian T.J. Miller trades insults with the brand's animated tap handle mascot, Wedgehead
Car	Jeep	"4x4ever"	
Car	Jeep	"Portraits"	In honor of the brand's 75-year anniversary, a montage of portraits of famous Jeep owners and users is presented.
Car	Hyundai Genesis	"First Date"	A father (Kevin Hart) lets his son borrow his Hyundai Genesis for his first date, but follows him around using the vehicle's tracking system, culminating with him using an actual helicopter to track him.
Car	Honda Ridgeline	"A New Truck to Love"	A herd of sheep sing Queen's "Somebody to Love", while the truck bed audio system of the new Ridgeline is demonstrated
Car	Audi	"Commander"	A retired astronaut, despondent at home, rediscovers his excitement when his son hands him the keys to an Audi R8 V10 Plus. The spot is set to David Bowie's "Starman", made more poignant following Bowie's death in January 2016
Car	Hyundai	"Ryanville"	A female driver and her passenger travel through a town where every person is Ryan Reynolds, repeatedly distracting them until the car's automatic emergency braking system intervenes
Car	Kia Optima	"Walken Closet"	Christopher Walken appears as a mysterious figure in a walk-in wardrobe, urging a man in plain beige socks to embrace the boldness of the new Kia Optima
Car	Buick	"Big Day"	At a wedding, Emily Ratajkowski catches the bouquet Odell Beckham Jr.-style, one-handed while falling backward, and guests are more surprised that the getaway car is a Buick Cascada convertible than by the catch itself
Car	Acura	"What He Said"	Showcases the design and features of the Acura NSX set to Van Halen's "Runnin' with the Devil", with David Lee Roth's vocals isolated from the music
Car accessories	WeatherTech	"Resources"	Highlights the manufacturing process and the employees who produce WeatherTech products
Clothing	Marmot	"Love the Outside"	A camper hangs outdoors with a marmot, and is slapped in the face when he attempts to kiss it
Film	10 Cloverfield Lane		Movie promo
Film	The Angry Birds Movie		Movie promo
Film	Batman v Superman: Dawn of Justice		Movie promo
Film	Captain America: Civil War		Movie promo
Film	Deadpool		Movie promo
Film	Eddie the Eagle		Movie promo
Film	Independence Day: Resurgence		Movie promo
Film	Jason Bourne		Movie promo
Film	The Jungle Book		Movie promo
Film	The Secret Life of Pets		Movie promo
Film	Teenage Mutant Ninja Turtles: Out of the Shadows		Movie promo
Film	X-Men: Apocalypse		Movie promo
Film	Zootopia		Movie promo
Food	Doritos	"Ultrasound"	A pregnant woman's newborn child shares her husband's fondness for Doritos
Food	Doritos	"Doritos Dogs"	A group of dogs evade a supermarket's "no dogs" policy to reach a Doritos display
Food	Heinz	"Weiner Stampede"	A pack of weiner dogs, dressed like hot dogs, run in slow motion towards humans in Heinz Ketchup and Mustard bottle costumes
Food	Skittles	"Portrait"	Steven Tyler is presented with a living portrait of himself made from Skittles, which explodes after he attempts to sing a high note from "Dream On".
Game	The Pokémon Company	"Train On"	Honors the 20th anniversary of the Pokémon franchise
Personal care	Dollar Shave Club	"Zeke"	A talking dirty razor, named Zeke, tries to talk to a man in a shower; into using him
Personal care	Schick	"Robot Razors"	Two razors transform into robots and battle it out over a sink in a bathroom
Phone	T-Mobile	"Drop The Balls"	In reference to his incorrect announcement of the winner of Miss Universe 2015, Steve Harvey apologizes for an error in a Verizon Wireless ad because T-Mobile had doubled the size of its LTE network in the past year. This ad was part of a then-ongoing ad war between Verizon, AT&T, Sprint Corporation (now part of T-Mobile), and T-Mobile, known as the "Colorful Ball Commercial Wars" which included a November 2015 ad from Verizon claiming they had a better network using red, blue, yellow, and pink balls, a January 2016 ad from Sprint claiming they had a better network using larger red, blue, yellow, and pink balls, the Steve Harvey Super Bowl ad, and a later ad from T-Mobile claiming they had a better network telling viewers what Verizon "didn't say", in a 2016 ad known as "Verizon's Secret". T-Mobile also released a non-TV ad titled "Busting Verizon's Balls", making fun of their November 2015 commercial.
Phone	T-Mobile	"Restricted Bling"	Executives from a cellphone provider interrupt Drake filming his music video for "Hotline Bling", seeking "improvements" to its lyrics to reflect caveats and hidden fees. This ad also made fun of Verizon and other networks in the "Colorful Ball Commercial Wars", as mentioned above.
Soft drink	Mountain Dew Kickstart	"Puppy Monkey Baby"	As a parallel to Mountain Dew Kickstart being a combination of three "awesome" things, a hybrid of a puppy, monkey, and baby is presented as another.
Sports	NFL	"Super Bowl Babies Choir"	A group of "Super Bowl Babies", who were all born within nine months of a Super Bowl having been won in their hometown, sing a football-themed version of Seal's "Kiss from a Rose".
Toothpaste	Colgate	"Every Drop Counts"	A water conservation PSA, encouraging people to turn off their faucets while brushing their teeth
Technology	LG Electronics		Features Liam Neeson in a short film directed by Ridley Scott promoting LG's OLED television
Technology	Amazon		Promotes Amazon Echo and its voice assistant Alexa
Web services	Squarespace		Features comedy duo Key & Peele in a sketch promoting the website-building platform
Web services	Wix	"Kung Fu Panda Discovers the Power of Wix"	Characters from DreamWorks Animation's Kung Fu Panda 3, including Po and Mei Mei, attempt various marketing schemes before building a website for Mr. Ping's Noodles restaurant using Wix

== 2017 (LI) ==
Product type	Advertiser/Product	Title	Plot/notes
Beer	Bud Light	"Ghost Spuds"	In a parody of A Christmas Carol, the ghost of former Bud Light mascot Spuds MacKenzie helps a man learn the importance of hanging out with friends.
Beer	Budweiser	"Born The Hard Way"	A story of the founder of Anheuser-Busch, Adolphus Busch, who left Germany to start a brewery in St. Louis, Missouri
Beer	Busch	"BUSCHHHHH"	The Busch Guy explains that Busch still has the "same great taste it's always had", as well as the same, seemingly never-ending sound.
Building materials	84 Lumber	"The Journey"	A mother and daughter embark on a journey to emigrate from Mexico to the United States. The version aired during the game was edited due to the political overtones of its conclusion, which depicts a border wall.
Car	Alfa Romeo	"Dear Predictable"	
Car	Alfa Romeo	"Mozzafiato"	
Car	Alfa Romeo	"Riding Dragons"	
Car	Audi	"Daughter"	A father (George Clooney) monologues as his daughter wins a soapbox derby race, wondering if he should tell her that about how "that despite her education, her drive, her skills, her intelligence, she will automatically be valued as less than every man she meets?"
Car	Buick	—N/a	Cam Newton joins a peewee football team
Car	Kia Niro	"Hero's Journey"	Melissa McCarthy gets injured in various ways whilst trying to protest various environmental causes
Car	Lexus LC	"Man and Machine"	Freestyle dancer Lil Buck performs a routine to Sia's "Move Your Body" inspired by the "human-like movement" of the Lexus LC. The ad also launched the Lexus brand's new tagline, "Experience Amazing".
Cleaner	Mr. Clean	"Cleaner of Your Dreams"	A woman dances with Mr. Clean as they clean a house together, but she is actually daydreaming
Film	Baywatch	—N/a	TV promo
Film	The Fate of the Furious	—N/a	Movie trailers
Film	Ghost in the Shell	—N/a	Movie trailers
Film	Guardians of the Galaxy Vol. 2	—N/a	Movie trailers
Film	Logan	"Grace"	Movie trailers
Film	Pirates of the Caribbean: Dead Men Tell No Tales	—N/a	Movie trailers
Film	Transformers: The Last Knight	—N/a	Movie trailers
Restaurant	Buffalo Wild Wings	"The Conspiracy"	Brett Favre learns what is responsible for all of his interceptions
Tax preparation	TurboTax	"Humpty Hospital"	Hospitalized after falling off a wall whilst doing his taxes (an event whose aftermath was seen in a prequel ad aired during the AFC Championship Game), Humpty Dumpty asks questions to a TurboTax advisor using its mobile app.
Technology	Intel	"Brady Everyday"	Tom Brady's personal life is presented with 360-degree instant replay technology.
TV series	24: Legacy (Fox)	—N/a	TV promos
TV series	Empire (Fox)	—N/a	TV promos
TV series	Genius (National Geographic)	—N/a	Albert Einstein (Geoffrey Rush) plays a short medley of songs on violin, including Lady Gaga's "Bad Romance" (the ad aired immediately following the Super Bowl LI halftime show featuring her).
TV series	Shots Fired (Fox)	—N/a	TV promo
TV series	Stranger Things (Netflix)	—N/a	TV promo for Season 2
TV series	The Handmaid's Tale (Hulu)	"My Name Is Offred"	TV promo
Video games	Nintendo Switch	"Switch and Play"	A showcase of launch titles for the upcoming video game console, including most prominently, The Legend of Zelda: Breath of the Wild.
Website	Airbnb	"We Accept"	The ad presents a pro-multiculturalism message. Airbnb and its co-founder Brian Chesky have been a vocal opponent of Executive Order 13769 (which briefly barred residents of certain Muslim-populated countries from entering the United States).
Web hosting	Squarespace	"Calling JohnMalkovich.com"	John Malkovich complains to someone who has already claimed the domain name "JohnMalkovich.com".
Web hosting	Wix.com	—N/a	A chef creates a website for his bistro, unaware that two people (Gal Gadot and Jason Statham) are fighting inside it
Wireless	Sprint	"No Need For Extreme Measures"	A person drops a car to fake his own death to cancel his contract with Verizon Wireless and switch to Sprint
Wireless	T-Mobile	"#BagOfUnlimited"	Martha Stewart and Snoop Dogg explain an unlimited data plan using cannabis-related puns
Wireless	T-Mobile	"#NSFWireless"	Kristen Schaal suggestively speaks with a Verizon Wireless customer service agent on the phone.
Wireless	T-Mobile	"#Punished"	Kristen Schaal enjoys being "punished" with the "pain" of Verizon Wireless' hidden fees and charges, which is said to be "fine, if you're into that sort of thing."
Wireless	T-Mobile	"#UnlimitedMoves"	Justin Bieber presents a history of touchdown celebrations.

== 2018 (LII) ==
Product type	Advertiser/Product	Title	Plot/notes
Airlines	Turkish Airlines	"Five Senses"	Dr. Oz talks about discovering the world using the five senses.
Beer	Budweiser	"Stand by You"	A Budweiser employee who is working at Anheuser-Busch's Cartersville brewery gets called to work to donate canned water for disaster relief. The ad used real employees who worked at the brewery.
Beer	Bud Light	"Ye Olde Pep Talk"	A medieval king tries to motivate his small villager army who is vastly outnumbered, until he brings up the fact that they are out of Bud Light and that the enemy has cases of them.
Beer	Bud Light	"The Bud Knight"	The big battle is interrupted by the Bud Knight, who is on his own quest.
Beer	Michelob Ultra	"The Perfect Fit"	Chris Pratt prepares for his acting gig as a spokesman.
Beer	Michelob Ultra	"I Like Beer"	Chris Pratt sings "I Like Beer" (a song by Tom T. Hall, covered by Jon Pardi) along with a bunch of people working out.
Candy	M&M's	"Human"	Red picks up a magic penny on the ground and uses a wish to transform into a human (Danny Devito).
Car accessories	WeatherTech	"American Factory"	The building of a WeatherTech factory in the U.S. is shown.
Car	Ram Trucks	"Built to Serve"	Martin Luther King Jr. speaks about the virtues of serving others.
Car	Ram 1500	"Icelandic Vikings"	Vikings drive a Dodge Ram and their boat into Minneapolis to the tune of Queen's "We Will Rock You", only to turn around when they find out their team is not playing.
Car	Hyundai	"Hope Detector"	Hyundai owners that attended the Super Bowl Experience are brought aside to meet cancer patients who were helped by Hyundai's donations to cancer research.
Car	Jeep Wrangler	"Anti-Manifesto"	As a Wrangler drives through a river, a narrator explains that this particular commercial would not feature "grandiose speeches and big declarations", and would instead be an "anti-manifesto".
Car	Jeep Wrangler Rubicon	"Jeep Jurassic"	Jeff Goldblum re-lives driving in Jurassic Park
Car	Jeep Cherokee	"The Road"	
Car	Kia Stinger	"Feel Something Again"	An old Steven Tyler rewinds time by driving his Kia backwards on a race track. Features race car driver Emerson Fittipaldi
Car and film	Lexus LS 500 F Sport, Black Panther	"Long Live the King"	After defeating an opponent to secure an item, the Black Panther follows a Lexus LS 500 F Sport and jumps through its sunroof where he transforms back to T'Challa.
Car	Toyota	"Good Odds"	Follows the odds of a paralympic skier of winning a gold medal, with the odds being reduced bit by bit as the woman grows and trains, and eventually reveals to be gold medalist Lauren Woolstencroft.
Car	Toyota	"Mobility Anthem"	The idea of mobility is portrayed as a broad concept unifies people of all ages and abilities.
Car	Toyota	"One Team"	A priest, a rabbi, and an imam carpool to the game together.
Cleaner	Febreze	"The Only Man Whose Bleep Doesn't Stink"	Dave's family and friends remark that Dave's Bleep doesn't stink.
Drink	Stella Artois and Water.org	"Taps"	Matt Damon asks that if 1% of the people watching the ad buy the beer, the company will give clean water to one million people for five years.
Film	Avengers: Infinity War	—N/a	Movie promo
Film	The Cloverfield Paradox (Netflix)	—N/a	TV promo, the film was then available on Netflix immediately after the game
Film	Mission: Impossible – Fallout	—N/a	Movie promo
Film	A Quiet Place		
Film	Skyscraper	—N/a	Movie promo
Film	Solo: A Star Wars Story	—N/a	Movie promo
Food	Avocados From Mexico	"#GuacWorld"	A utopian society sealed from the rest of the world realize that their tortilla chips for their guacamole are outside.
Food	Jack in the Box	"Jack vs. Martha"	Jack interrupts Martha Stewart's show to show off his newest creations. Martha then challenges Jack, pulling his nose off.
Food	Kraft Foods	"Family Greatly"	Kraft assembles a montage of photos and videos from families celebrating game day.
Food	Pringles	"Wow 2018"	Bill Hader and other actors remark about stacking different flavored Pringles.
Food	Wendy's	"Iceberg"	Wendy's slams McDonald's for using flash-frozen beef patties, likening being frozen to the iceberg and the Titanic.
Food and drink	Doritos and Mountain Dew	"Doritos Blaze vs. Mtn Dew Ice"	Peter Dinklage and Morgan Freeman perform a lip-sync rap battle with Dinklage lip-syncing to a Busta Rhymes performed verse of Chris Brown's "Look at Me Now" and Freeman to "Get Ur Freak On" by Missy Elliott
Headphones	Monster	—N/a	A guy on the subway (RiceGum) is inspired by Iggy Azalea to create a new set of Monster headphones. Also features Joe Perry, Joey Fatone, Yo Gotti and others.
Investments	E-Trade	"This Is Getting Old"	A group of senior citizens try to perform physically active jobs because they don't have enough to retire.
Laundry detergent	Persil	"Game-time Stain-time"	The Professional steps out of a big screen to clean a guacamole stain off a viewer's shirt.
Laundry detergent	Tide	"It's a Tide Ad"	David Harbour examines several typical types of commercials one would see during the Super Bowl, only to reveal that they're all actually Tide ads because they have clean clothes.
Laundry detergent	Tide	"It's Another Tide Ad"	The Old Spice Guy (Isaiah Mustafa) is interrupted when his ad suddenly becomes a Tide ad.
Laundry detergent	Tide	"It's Yet Another Tide Ad"	A beer commercial with clydesdales, and the Mr. Clean commercial from the previous game, are similarly hijacked by Tide ads.
Laundry detergent	Tide	"It's Yet Another Tide Ad, Again"	A woman playing tennis hurts her back, so David Harbour arrives and pitches Tide detergent.
Loans	Rocket Mortgage	"Translator"	Keegan-Michael Key helps translate for people the words of a hair stylist, a waiter, Big Sean's rap music and a loan officer.
Retail	Groupon	"Who Wouldn't"	Tiffany Haddish talks about how using Groupon supports local businesses.
Shoes	Skechers	"First Class for your Feet"	Howie Long gets a seat upgrade.
Soft drink	Coca-Cola	"The Wonder of Us"	People of various cultures read lines from a poem about a Coke for them.
Soft drink	Diet Coke	"Groove"	Actress Hayley Magnus tries the Diet Coke Twisted Mango flavor, and can't help dancing afterwards.
Soft drink	Pepsi	"This Is the Pepsi"	Jimmy Fallon narrates about some of the celebrities who have appeared in Pepsi commercials, with footage of Britney Spears and Michael Jackson. Cindy Crawford re-creates her Pepsi drinking moment, and her teenage son Presley Gerber appears. Kyrie Irving appears as Uncle Drew, and Jeff Gordon also appears. This was the lead-in commercial to the halftime show.
Sports	2018 Winter Olympics (NBC)	"Best of U.S.: Lindsey Vonn"	Skier Lindsey Vonn prepares for the 2018 Winter Olympics. Other ads for Chloe Kim, Mikaela Shiffrin, Nathan Chen, and Shaun White were prepared. Shaun White's ad was the first ad played after the game ended.
Sports	2018 Winter Olympics (NBC)	A number of promotions by NBC for their Olympic coverage.	
Sports	NFL	"Touchdown Celebrations to Come"	After multiple teaser ads, Eli Manning and Odell Beckham Jr. re-create an iconic scene from Dirty Dancing.
Sports	NFL	"Next Season Starts Now"	Featuring Jalen Ramsey, Marquette King, Devonta Freeman, Jared Goff, Stefon Diggs and Travis Kelce; also stars NBA player Nick Young, who at the time was playing for the Golden State Warriors
Sports	2018 FIFA World Cup (Telemundo)	"Telemundo ya prepara su mejor grito gol para Rusia 2018"	Andrés Cantor lets out his signature goal call over footage from previous FIFA World Cups, ending with a mic drop.
Tax preparation	Intuit	"Giant Skip Ad"	A brief ad about how people don't like to watch ads and want to skip them. Shows the characters from the CGI short film "A Giant Story" which was posted in advance.
Tax preparation	TurboTax	"The Noise in the Attic"	A sheeted ghost in the attic approaches an open laptop where a representative talks about their tax software program.
Tax preparation	TurboTax	"The Thing Under the Bed"	Features CG-animated boogeyman talking about how easy it is to answer the questions in the software program.
Technology	Amazon Echo	"Alexa Loses Her Voice"	When Alexa loses her voice, Amazon representatives tell their CEO Jeff Bezos that they have replacement voices ready, which turn out to be celebrities such as Gordon Ramsay, Cardi B, Rebel Wilson and Anthony Hopkins.
TV series	Castle Rock (Hulu)	—N/a	TV promos
TV series	Good Girls (NBC)	—N/a	TV promos
TV series	Rise (NBC)	—N/a	TV promos
TV series	This Is Us (NBC)	—N/a	TV promos
TV series	Today (NBC)	—N/a	TV promos
TV series	Tom Clancy's Jack Ryan (Amazon Prime)	—N/a	TV promo
TV series	Unsolved: The Murders of Tupac & the Notorious B.I.G. (USA Network)	—N/a	TV promo
TV series	The Voice (NBC)	"The Voice Super Commercial"	Blake Shelton, Adam Levine, Alicia Keys and Kelly Clarkson do a country-styled video to promote the new season of The Voice.
TV series	Westworld season 2 (HBO)	—N/a	TV promo
TV special	Jesus Christ Superstar Live in Concert (NBC)	—N/a	TV promo
Travel	Tourism Australia	"Dundee"	A trailer for Dundee, a Crocodile Dundee reboot supposedly starring Danny McBride and Chris Hemsworth, reveals itself to be an ad for travel to Australia.
Travel	Universal Parks & Resorts	"In Game" a.k.a. "Peyton Manning: Vacation Quarterback"	Peyton Manning and his family visit a Universal theme park.
Video game	Heroes Arena	"Conquer Your Battles"	
Website	Blacture	"Be Celebrated"	Fugee members talk about a new website that celebrates black excellence.
Website	Squarespace	"Make It With Keanu Reeves"	Keanu Reeves rides his motorcycle in the middle of a desert highway while standing on it as he cites lines from Will Power's "Adventures In Success".
Website	Wix.com	"Rhett & Link"	Internet YouTuber comedians Rhett and Link use Wix.com to create a website.
Wireless	Sprint	"Evelyn"	A doctor analyzed Evelyn's artificial intelligence and she notices that his carrier is Verizon. Other robots in the lab to laugh at him as a result. He tells the Sprint guy he is switching because his co-workers are making fun of him.
Wireless	Verizon Wireless	"Remember the First Responders"	10-second clip after the halftime show where Justin Timberlake thanks the first responders
Wireless	Verizon Wireless	"Answering the Call"	60-second commercial slide montage of first responders in action
Wireless	T-Mobile	"Little Ones"	Babies around the world look up to a camera where a woman gives them social messages.

== 2019 (LIII) ==
Product type	Advertiser/product	Title	Plot/notes
Alcohol	Bon & Viv Spiked Seltzer	"The Pitch"	Two mermaids "pitch" Bon & Viv Spiked Seltzer to literal "sharks".
Alcohol	Bud Light	"Special Delivery"	The Bud Light King mistakenly receives a gigantic barrel of corn syrup, which his followers attempt to gift to Coors Light and Miller Lite instead, since Bud Light does not use corn syrup as an ingredient.
Alcohol	Bud Light	"Joust"	The Bud Knight is defeated in a jousting match by The Mountain.
Alcohol	Budweiser	"Wind Never Felt Better"	A dalmatian rides a cart pulled by the Clydesdales through a wind farm at Tejon Ranch, promoting the brand's commitment to using renewable energy in its production process.
Alcohol	Hennessy	"Major"	Major Taylor, a track cyclist of the 1890s and 1900s, reaches the end of a race where the only competitor is himself.
Alcohol	Michelob Ultra	"Robots"	Stars a robot, running, golfing, cycling, and walking alongside humans. At the end of the ad, the robot looks longingly at humans enjoying a beer and the strapline reads "It's only worth it if you can enjoy it".
Alcohol	Michelob Ultra Pure Gold	"The Pure Experience"	Zoë Kravitz invites viewers to experience an ASMR sensation inspired by the new lite "Pure Gold" brew.
Alcohol	Stella Artois	"Change Up the Usual"	At a bar, Sarah Jessica Parker decides to order a Stella Artois rather than a cosmopolitan (the signature drink of her Sex and the City character Carrie Bradshaw). Jeff Bridges (in a portrayal of his The Big Lebowski character "The Dude") follows suit by similarly declining a White Russian in favor of a "Stella Artose".
Beverage	Bubly sparkling water	"Bublé vs. Bubly"	At a store, singer Michael Bublé insists on pronouncing the name of Bubly as "Bublé", even after another customer and a clerk (whom Bublé refers to as "Davé") corrects him.
Beverage	Pepsi	"More Than OK"	When a restaurant patron requesting a Coca-Cola is asked by a waiter if a Pepsi was okay instead, Steve Carell disputes their implication that Pepsi was merely "okay".
Candy	M&M's Chocolate Bar	"Bad Passenger"	The M&M's characters fight in the backseat of a car driven by Christina Applegate, who threatens to "break them apart" and eat them if they don't behave: it is revealed that they had been embedded in a chocolate bar.
Car	Audi e-tron GT	"Cashew"	A man encounters his grandfather at an isolated house in a field, where he shows him an Audi e-tron GT in his garage. Just as the man is about to drive it, it is revealed that this was only a dream, and that the man was actually at work choking on a cashew.
Car	Hyundai Shopper Assurance	"The Elevator"	Jason Bateman mans an elevator taking people to floors reflecting life experiences they don't always look forward to (such as a dentist appointment and a vegan dinner party). When a couple is sent to a floor for car shopping, Bateman is told that they were actually getting a Hyundai, and had used Shopper Assurance to pick a vehicle and schedule a test drive without haggling with a salesperson.
Car	Kia Telluride	"Give It Everything"	The city of West Point, Georgia is revitalized by the opening of a Kia factory there.
Car	Mercedes-Benz A-Class	"Say The Word"	A man uses his voice to control real life, just as he can control the entertainment system on his A-Class.
Car	Toyota RAV4 Hybrid	"Toni"	Jim Nantz narrates a story on challenging expectations, focusing on female football player Antoinette Harris.
Car	Toyota Supra	"Wizard"	To The Who's "Pinball Wizard", the Toyota Supra drives through a giant pinball machine.
Film	Alita: Battle Angel	—N/a	Movie promo
Film	Avengers: Endgame	—N/a	Movie promo
Film	Captain Marvel	—N/a	Movie promo
Film	Hobbs & Shaw	—N/a	Movie promo
Film	How to Train Your Dragon: The Hidden World	—N/a	Movie promo
Film	Scary Stories to Tell in the Dark	—N/a	Movie promos
Film	Toy Story 4	—N/a	Movie promos
Film	Us	—N/a	Movie promo
Film	Wonder Park	—N/a	Movie promo
Food	Avocados from Mexico	"Top Dog"	Kristin Chenoweth judges a dog show where the dogs' human owners are the competitors rather than the dogs themselves.
Food	Burger King	"#EatLikeAndy"	Footage of Andy Warhol eating a Whopper from the film 66 Scenes from America
Food	Flamin' Hot Doritos	"Now It's Hot"	Chance the Rapper raps over the Backstreet Boys' "I Want It That Way" to make the original "hot".
Food	Pringles	"Sad Device"	A smart speaker emotionally resents not being able to stack Pringles because it doesn't have hands, but is interrupted when its asked to play "Funkytown" instead.
Smart speaker	Amazon Echo	"Not Everything Makes the Cut"	A series of rejected ideas for Alexa-powered products are presented, including an electric toothbrush, a dog collar with bark recognition (which causes Harrison Ford's dog to repeatedly order dog food), hot tub (which triggers an extravagant water show when playing music), and space station (which causes an "incident" affecting electrical power worldwide).
NFL	NFL centennial season	"The 100-Year Game"	Marshawn Lynch tries to steal a slice of cake at a gala celebrating the NFL's 100th season, but knocks a football centerpiece off in the process—instigating a fight for the ball involving a cast of current and past players. The ad also features appearances by Sarah Thomas (the NFL's first female official), and video game streamer Tyler "Ninja" Blevins.
Store	Walmart Grocery Pickup	"Famous Cars"	A number of iconic vehicles from film and television visit a Walmart store to use its Grocery Pickup service. This ad originally premiered during the 2019 Golden Globe Awards.
TV series	The Handmaid's Tale season 3 (Hulu)	—N/a	The ad opens with scenes and narration based on Ronald Reagan's "Morning in America" campaign advertisement, but is interrupted by violent scenes of the series' dystopian society.
TV series	Hanna (Amazon Video)	—N/a	Promo
TV series	The Late Show with Stephen Colbert (CBS)	—N/a	A song and dance number promoting Stephen Colbert's special Late Show episode after the game is interrupted by "CBS Sports Breaking News", with James Brown informing viewers that "today is the Super Bowl". By the time the ad returns, the number had already ended.
TV series	The Twilight Zone (CBS All Access)	—N/a	After a fake interruption of CBS's Super Bowl telecast, Jordan Peele addresses an empty Mercedes-Benz Stadium, asking viewers to question their reality.
Video gaming	Xbox Adaptive Controller	"We All Win"	Owen Sirmons, a child with Escobar syndrome, is able to play video games using Microsoft's Xbox Adaptive Controller.
Wireless	T-Mobile	"Dad?!"	A father accidentally texts someone on searching to make eggplant parmigiana.
Wireless	T-Mobile		"Mike" responds to a text message to what is actually a Lyft driver.
Wireless	T-Mobile	"We'll Keep This Brief"	A person texts to Cathy to check on her only to very long lengthy response about her day.
Wireless	T-Mobile	"What's for Dinner?"	In a conversation between the two, a person tries to figure out a response and while considering to eat between tacos and sushi.
