= The Huckabee Report =

- Country of origin: US
- Language: English
- Syndicates: Cumulus Media Networks (through Cumulus Media)
- Hosted by: Mike Huckabee
- Original release: January 4, 2009 – May 1, 2015
- Website: http://radio.mikehuckabee.com/

The Huckabee Report was a radio program hosted by former Republican governor of Arkansas Mike Huckabee, that aired from January 2009 to May 1, 2015. The program was broadcast on Cumulus Media Networks (formerly Citadel Media and ABC Radio Networks), three times each day (Monday–Friday), and each commentary was approximately 4 minutes long.

On March 23, 2009, The Huckabee Report replaced News and Comment with Gil Gross and The Rest of the Story with Doug Limerick on all network stations that still carried them. Both of the programs Huckabee replaced were originally hosted by Paul Harvey, who had died three weeks prior. Pat Reeder was a writer for the show. In February 2010, Citadel Media announced The Huckabee Report reached more than 500 affiliates, making it the fastest growing radio program of the past decade.

Late in 2014, when he had more than 500 stations, Huckabee said he would syndicate the program himself.

On April 15, 2015, Huckabee announced on his program that broadcasts on the radio would end, but that subscribers could hear similar content which they would pay for.

Preceded by News and Comment with Gil Gross	History of News and Comment; 2009-2015	Succeeded by None
