= James Wesley =

American country music singer (born 1970)

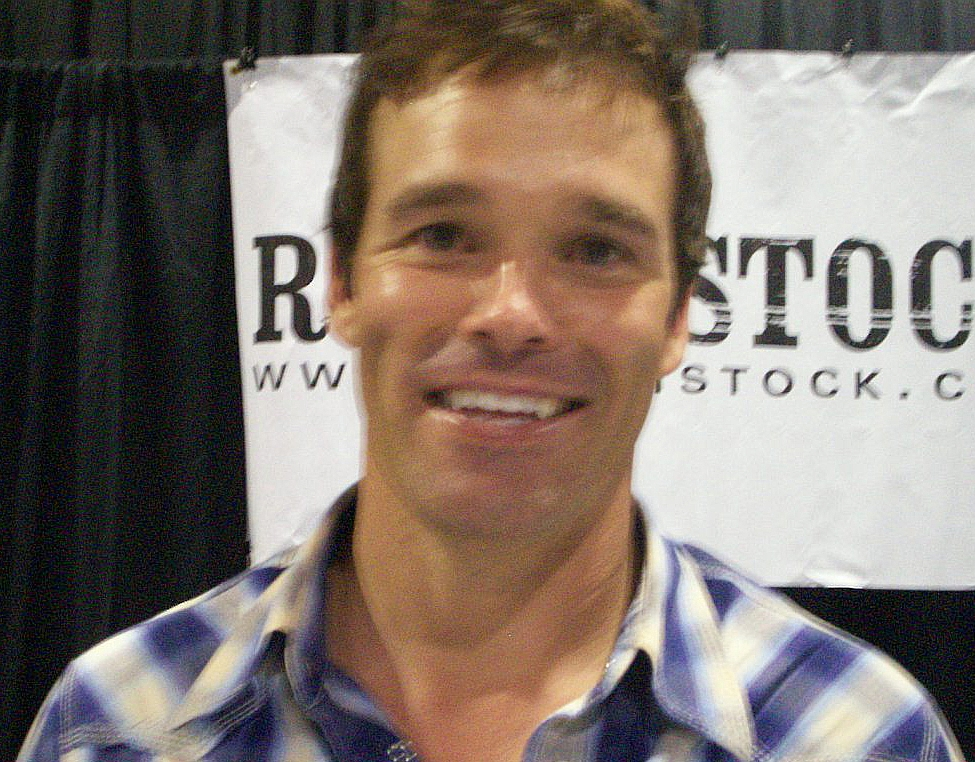
- Wesley at CMA Music Festival, June 2010

Background information
- Also known as: James Prosser
- Born: James Wesley Prosser; March 9, 1970 (age 56); Mound Valley, Kansas
- Genres: Country
- Occupation: Singer
- Instruments: Guitar and Vocals
- Years active: 1999–present
- Labels: Warner Bros. Nashville; Broken Bow

James Wesley Prosser (born March 9, 1970) is an American country music singer. In 1999, Prosser released the album Life Goes On through Warner Bros. Records. Ten years later, he signed to Broken Bow Records under the name James Wesley. Wesley released five singles for this label, including the top 30 hits "Real" and "Didn't I". He recorded a second studio album, Real, for the label, but it went unreleased.

== Early life and career ==
Wesley was born in Mound Valley, Kansas.

=== Life Goes On ===
James Wesley Prosser was born in Mound Valley, Kansas. He played music at several venues in college before meeting songwriter Rodney Clawson, who has co-written singles by Jason Aldean and George Strait. Prosser signed to a recording deal with Warner Bros. Records and recorded his debut album, Life Goes On, in 1999. The album produced two singles which charted on the Billboard Hot Country Singles & Tracks (now Hot Country Songs) chart. Allmusic gave the album three stars, saying that Prosser's "singing and writing … are truly unique."

After the release of this album, Prosser worked various blue collar jobs. He returned to Nashville in 2006.

=== Second album ===
Wesley signed to Broken Bow in 2009 and released his first single for the label, "Jackson Hole," on December 7, 2009. This song debuted at number 54 on the Billboard Hot Country Songs charts dated for January 16, 2010. Later in 2010, Wesley charted again with the song "Real", written by Neal Coty and Jimmy Melton. "Real" was made into a music video in September 2010, directed by Chris Hicky. Wesley's third single for Broken Bow, "Didn't I," was released in April 2011. It was followed by "Walking Contradiction", co-written by Kip Moore, which did not make Top 40. His next single was "Thank a Farmer", written by Steve Bogard, Josh Thompson, and Dustin Lynch, and inspired by a 2013 Dodge Ram commercial incorporating Paul Harvey's "So God Made a Farmer" speech. This song was released during Super Bowl XLVII. On March 22, 2015 Wesley released to iTunes a single called, "Hooked Up" which a portion of the proceeds go to the Big Rock Blue Marlin Tournament Charities and the ASA's Keep America Fishing Foundation. A music video has been completed and premiered on August 31, 2015 on CMT television.

== Discography ==
=== Singles ===
==== As James Prosser ====
Year	Single	Peak chart positions		Album
Year	Single	US Country	CAN Country	Album
1999	"Life Goes On"	59	84	Life Goes On (unreleased)
1999	"Angels Don't Fly"	66	—	Life Goes On (unreleased)
"—" denotes releases that did not chart

==== As James Wesley ====
Year	Single	Peak chart positions			Album
Year	Single	US Country	US Country Airplay	US Bubbling	Album
2010	"Jackson Hole"	41	—	—	Real (unreleased)
2010	"Real"	22	—	19	Real (unreleased)
2011	"Didn't I"	24	—	—	Real (unreleased)
2012	"Walking Contradiction"	54	—	—	Real (unreleased)
2013	"Thank a Farmer"	—	50	—	Real (unreleased)
2015	"Hooked Up"	—	—	—	—N/a
"—" denotes releases that did not chart

=== Music videos ===
Year	Video	Director
1999	"Life Goes On"	Jim Shea
2010	"Real"	Chris Hicky
2011	"Didn't I"	Marcel
2015	"Hooked Up"	Alexander Manning
