= Didn't I =

Didn't I may refer to:

- "Didn't I" (Dottie West song), 1964
- "Didn't I" (James Wesley song), 2011
- "Didn't I" (OneRepublic song), 2020
- "Didn't I (Blow Your Mind This Time)", a 1969 song by the Delfonics
- "Didn't I", a song by Aqua from Aquarium, 1997
- "Didn't I", a song by Jaira Burns from Burn Slow, 2018
- "Didn't I", a song by Kelly Clarkson from Meaning of Life, 2017
- "Didn't I", a song by Darondo, 1973
- "Didn't I", a song by Rod Stewart from Blood Red Roses, 2018
