= Lynne Cooper Harvey =

American radio producer (1916–2008)

Lynne "Angel" Cooper Harvey
- Born: October 4, 1916; St. Louis, Missouri, US
- Died: May 3, 2008 (aged 91); River Forest, Illinois, US
- Resting place: Forest Home Cemetery, Chicago, Illinois
- Education: Washington University in St. Louis
- Occupation: Radio producer
- Spouse: Paul Harvey (1940–2008)
- Children: Paul Harvey Jr.

Lynne "Angel" (née Cooper) Harvey (October 4, 1916 – May 3, 2008) was an American radio producer. She was producer for The Rest of the Story, and the first producer to enter the National Radio Hall of Fame. Dubbed the "First Lady of Radio," Harvey had a transformative sixty-year career, changing American radio and television news format.

== Early life and career ==
Harvey was born in St. Louis, Missouri, and graduated from Washington University in St. Louis with a BA and MA in English. Harvey was a member of Phi Beta Kappa at Washington University and was a former schoolteacher. In 1939, she went to work for KXOK. There she met her future husband Paul Harvey. Paul Harvey invited her to dinner, proposed to her after a few minutes of conversation and from then on called her "Angel," even on his radio show. The two were married in 1940, and moved to WKZO in Kalamazoo, Michigan in 1941. The couple moved to Chicago in 1945.

In 1997, Lynne Harvey was the first producer ever inducted into the Radio Hall of Fame, and had developed some of her husband's best-known features, such as "The Rest of the Story." While working on her husband's radio show, she established 10 p.m. as the hour in which news is broadcast. She was the first woman to receive a lifetime achievement award from the Chicago chapter of American Women in Radio and Television. She worked in television also, and created a television show called Dilemma which is acknowledged as the prototype of the modern talk show genre. While working at CBS, she was among the first women to produce an entire newscast. In later years, she was best known as a philanthropist.

== Later life and death ==
On May 17, 2007, Harvey told his radio audience that Angel had contracted leukemia. Her death, at the age of 91, was announced by ABC radio on May 3, 2008. When she died at their River Forest home, the Chicago Sun-Times described her as, "More than his astute business partner and producer, she also was a pioneer for women in radio and an influential figure in her own right for decades." According to the founder of the Museum of Broadcast Communications, Bruce DuMont, "She was to Paul Harvey what Colonel Parker was to Elvis Presley. She really put him on track to have the phenomenal career that his career has been."
