= Paul Harvey Jr. =

American radio broadcaster

Paul Harvey Aurandt Jr. (born 1948 or 1949), is an American pianist, radio broadcaster and a former host of News and Comment on ABC Radio Networks. He is the only child of Paul Harvey and his wife Lynne.

Harvey's version of the show was significantly different in that it was not time sensitive, taped in advance (as opposed to the same-day recordings his father performed), and focused on non-current topics such as "scientific developments, medicine, unusual phenomena and other stories that are not directly connected to the day's news", and often contained "no time-sensitive or topical material". As a result, several stations either moved the program to less prominent time slots or dropped it outright.

Harvey hosted the morning edition of News and Comment starting in April 2008, when his father left that edition of the show. He ended the broadcasts by saying, "Now that's news". Prior to that, Harvey announced the bumpers leading in and out of his father's show and helped write some of the scripts. He was the creator and writer for The Rest of the Story, another of his father's programs.

Harvey was inducted into the National Radio Hall of Fame in 2001, primarily for his role as creator and writer for The Rest of the Story.

Media offices
| Preceded by Paul Harvey Sr. | Host of News and Comment (mornings); 2008–2009 | Succeeded by Gil Gross |
