= Real (James Wesley song) =

Single by James Wesley
- Released: May 24, 2010
- Genre: Country
- Length: 3:33
- Label: Broken Bow
- Songwriters: Neal Coty; Jimmy Melton
- Producer: Dan Frizsell; Rodney Clawson

James Wesley singles chronology
"Jackson Hole" (2010)	"Real" (2010)	"Didn't I" (2011)

"Real" is a song written by Neal Coty and Jimmy Melton and recorded by American country music artist James Wesley. It was released in May 2010, and it peaked at number 22 on the U.S. Billboard Hot Country Songs in 2011.

== Background and writing ==
Wesley told Engine 145 that when he heard the song for the first time, he immediately related with its sentiments. "I know what it’s like to try to make a dollar and beat the check to the bank," Wesley said. "It hit me… that’s where I’ve been. I did that up until a year ago."

== Content ==
The first verse discusses how so-called reality television shows such as The Bachelor or The Bachelorette are pedaled as real examples of love when they’re anything but. The chorus then goes on to show off everything that is really real in life. The second verse and chorus, focused mostly on farming, compares popular reality show titles (The Real Housewives, Survivor and The Amazing Race) with real-life situations like a drought, floods and check fraud. The coda continues with this theme as the real-life comparisons get increasingly more stark: offshoring of jobs to Mexico, family homelessness presumably stemming from spousal abuse, home foreclosure and finally the death of a military serviceman.

== Critical reception ==
Matt Bjorke of Roughstock gave the song four stars out of five, saying that the song is "instantly relatable to anyone who takes a chance to really listen to the lyrics." He goes on to say that it "never feels pandering and instead sounds like something that everyone has thought about ‘reality TV’ shows since their mainstream arrival a decade ago."

== Music video ==
The video was directed by Chris Hicky and premiered in September 2010.

== Chart performance ==
Chart (2010–2011)	Peak position
US Hot Country Songs (Billboard)	22
US Billboard Bubbling Under Hot 100	19

=== Year-end charts ===
Chart (2011)	Position
US Country Songs (Billboard)	85
