= Chance and Circumstance =

Studio album by Neal Coty
- Released: 1997
- Genre: Country
- Label: Mercury
- Producer: Keith Stegall

Neal Coty chronology
Chance and Circumstance (1997)	Legacy (2000)

Chance and Circumstance is the debut album by the American musician Neal Coty, released in 1997.

Coty promoted the album by playing shows with Pat MacDonald and Kim Richey, among others. The album cover artwork, by Jeff Hand, won a Nashville Music Award.

== Production ==
The album was produced by Keith Stegall, who found Coty through a publishing deal. It was recorded in Los Angeles and Memphis, as the pair did not want to highlight a Nashville association. Many of Chance and Circumstance's songs were cowritten with Randy VanWarmer. The album contains a hidden track.

== Critical reception ==
Professional ratings
Review scores
Source	Rating
AllMusic	4/5 stars
Chicago Tribune	3/4 stars
The Commercial Appeal	3.5/4 stars
Entertainment Weekly	A
MusicHound Rock: The Essential Album Guide	4/5 stars
Ottawa Citizen	3/5 stars
USA Today	3.5/4 stars

The Washington Post wrote that, "far more often than not, Coty comes across as a first-rate storyteller who puts most of the competition in country music to shame." The Chicago Reader noted that "Coty's got the good taste to lift Benmont Tench's mordant organ sound, which was always the Heartbreakers' secret weapon." USA Today determined that most of the album is "like a rewarding and interesting conversation with Coty, providing a surprisingly wide range of rootsy music plus savvy, caustic commentary on life's odd turns."

Entertainment Weekly thought that "Coty sings with an exploding powder keg of a voice and weds blues, country, and rock like he was born for the task." The Chicago Tribune stated that Coty's "tales find the dark and dangerous corners of the human soul and can be extremely unsettling." The Record concluded that "an unmistakable Springsteen influence runs through Neal Coty's debut, from the sometimes melodramatic flourishes of the music to the scruffy, restless, and wounded characters who populate the songs."

== Track listing ==
All tracks are written by Neal Coty and Randy VanWarmer, except as noted.

No.	Title	Writer(s)	Length
1.	"Tainted"		4:25
2.	"Chance and Circumstance"		4:39
3.	"Lost and Driftin'"		3:53
4.	"Heaven in the Dark"	Coty	5:17
5.	"Hey Lucy"		4:16
6.	"Kalifornia"		4:23
7.	"She's the Girl for Me"		2:43
8.	"Ghost Town"	Coty, VanWarmer, Bob Hamilton	3:43
9.	"Wreck of a Heart"		5:14
10.	"When I See Jesus (Walk Across Lake Pontchartrain)"		4:50
11.	"Two Boys from Creagerstown"		5:18
12.	"I Just Can't Slow Down"	Coty	2:59
