= Neal Coty =

American singer-songwriter (born 1964)

- Born: Neal Lee Angleberger; May 13, 1964 (age 61)
- Origin: Thurmont, Maryland, U.S.
- Genres: Country
- Occupation: Singer-songwriter
- Instrument: Vocals
- Years active: 1997–present
- Labels: Mercury Nashville

Neal Lee Angleberger (born May 13, 1964), known professionally as Neal Coty, is an American country music singer and songwriter. He has released two albums for Mercury Records Nashville, and has written several singles for other artists.

== Biography ==
Coty was born Neal Lee Angleberger on May 13, 1964, in Thurmont, Maryland. He was adopted at an early age, and never met his biological father. Coty drew musical inspiration from his uncles, who were fans of both country music and Southern rock. He began playing guitar as a child after his grandmother gave him one.

After graduating high school, Coty attended a cosmetology school, but dropped out after only two months. He then attended a theater program at Towson University as a young adult, and would perform his own material during open-mic nights. He was booked as a touring act for Kathy Mattea after being discovered by a talent agent. Next he spent time in New York City and Los Angeles in pursuit of an acting career; in the latter city, he found some small success writing commercial jingles. Encouraged by a friend, he then moved to Nashville, Tennessee to pursue a country music career, something which he was inspired to do by reading the names of the songwriters on album liner notes. Through the assistance of a music publisher, he then began writing songs with Randy VanWarmer and Roger Murrah; one of these songs, "Collect from Wichita", was cut by Ronna Reeves. From this songwriting success came a contract with Mercury Records Nashville, which issued his debut album Chance and Circumstance in 1997. The album was produced by Keith Stegall, best known for his work with Alan Jackson. "Tainted" was sent to country radio as the album's lead single that same year. Mike Joyce of The Washington Post reviewed the album favorably, calling him "a first-rate storyteller who puts most of the competition in country music to shame."

Coty released his second Mercury album, Legacy, in 2001. The album's title track served as lead single, spending eleven weeks on the Billboard Hot Country Songs charts and peaking at number 49. Coty wrote six of the album's eleven tracks, also covering Tom Petty and the Heartbreakers' "You Got Lucky" and Bruce Springsteen's "Sad Eyes". The title track was inspired by a line of dialogue from an episode of the television series Ally McBeal. To promote the album, Coty drove to various radio stations in a truck with his picture painted on it, and the label partnered with Jones Radio Networks and the television channel Great American Country (GAC) to hold a sweepstakes in which said truck was the grand prize. Ray Waddell of Billboard reviewed Legacy favorably, stating that Coty was in "creative, confident mode" and calling him an "edgy yet melodic tunesmith". Kevin Oliver of Country Standard Time was more mixed, stating that Coty was "more focused on mainstream country sounds than his debut" but "sounds too much like others and not himself".

Coty has not recorded an album since Legacy, although he has continued to write songs since the album's release. Six songs that he co-wrote have been Hot Country Songs entries for other artists: "She Was" by Mark Chesnutt, "Every Friday Afternoon" by Craig Morgan, "I'm One of You" by Hank Williams Jr., "Playboys of the Southwestern World" by Blake Shelton, "Last Good Time" by Flynnville Train, and "Real" by James Wesley. Coty has been signed to Roger Murrah's publishing company Murrah Music Group since 1994, and between 2006 and 2007 he was also part of a joint venture with Bicycle Music. Murrah Music Group was acquired by Bug Music in 2009.

== Musical style ==
Phyllis Stark of Billboard wrote that Coty "plays the hillbilly card to mask a sharp intelligence that, nevertheless, reveals itself in his songwriting." The same publication's Ray Waddell compared Coty's storytelling songs favorably to those of Steve Earle, a comparison also made by Mike Joyce of The Washington Post.

== Personal life ==
At the time that Legacy was released, Coty had been on his second marriage. He had one son and one daughter with his then-wife, Kelly, who also had two children from her previous marriage.

== Discography ==
=== Albums ===
| Title | Album details |
|---|---|
| Chance and Circumstance | Release date: August 5, 1997; Label: Mercury Nashville |
| Legacy | Release date: March 6, 2001; Label: Mercury Nashville |

=== Singles ===
| Year | Single | Peak positions | Album |
| Year | Single | US Country | Album |
|---|---|---|---|
| 1997 | "Tainted" | — | Chance and Circumstance |
| 2000 | "Legacy" | 49 | Legacy |
| 2001 | "Right Down Through the Middle of Us" | — | Legacy |
"—" denotes releases that did not chart

=== Music videos ===
| Year | Video | Director |
|---|---|---|
| 1997 | "Tainted" | |
| 2000 | "Legacy" | Steven T. Miller/Brad Murano |
| 2001 | "Breathin'" | Steven T. Miller/Brad Murano |
