= Didn't I (James Wesley song) =

Single by James Wesley
- Released: April 11, 2011
- Genre: Country
- Length: 3:26
- Label: Broken Bow
- Songwriters: Ben Glover; Kyle Jacobs; Randy Montana
- Producers: Rodney Clawson; Dan Frizsell

James Wesley singles chronology
"Real" (2010)	"Didn't I" (2011)	"Walking Contradiction" (2012)

"Didn't I" is a song recorded by American country music artist James Wesley. It was released in April 2011. The song was written by Ben Glover, Kyle Jacobs and Randy Montana.

== Critical reception ==
Amanda Hensel of Taste of Country gave the song a favorable review, writing that "with singable lyrics and familiar feelings, country music fans will be all over it." Bobby Peacock of Roughstock gave the song four stars out of five, saying that Wesley "matches up very well to the guitar-heavy but radio-friendly production."

== Music video ==
The music video was directed by Marcel and premiered in July 2011.

== Chart performance ==
"Didn't I" debuted at number 58 on the U.S. Billboard Hot Country Songs chart for the week of April 30, 2011.

Chart (2011)	Peak position
US Hot Country Songs (Billboard)	24

=== Year-end charts ===
Chart (2011)	Position
US Country Songs (Billboard)	91
