= Born the Hard Way =

- Directed by: Chris Sargent

Production
- Cinematography: Lipes
- Running time: 60 seconds

Born the Hard Way is a television commercial for brewing company Anheuser-Busch which debuted on February 5, 2017 during Super Bowl LI. The commercial depicts company founder Adolphus Busch's journey to the United States from his native Germany. The commercial stars actor Sam Schweikert who portrays the young Busch's journey to the United states. The commercial drew attention for debuting just days after U.S. President Donald Trump's executive action banning immigrants from predominantly Muslim countries.

== Planning ==
Planning for the advertisement started in the summer of 2016 when Budweiser briefed their ad agency, Anomaly, that it wanted an advertisement that "celebrated the American Dream". Anomaly came up with a variety of concepts but went with the immigrants tale because they felt it went the deepest in capturing the "actual value of the American dream". Drawing on inspiration from film maker Paul Thomas Anderson director Chris Sargent created an ad that captured Adolphus Busch's journey to the United States.

== Synopsis ==
The commercial is a dramatization of Adolphus Busch's journey from Germany to St. Louis where he meets his business partner Eberhard Anheuser.

The commercial opens at a bar in St. Louis where a man walks in and is greeted by a patron who says, "You're not from around here." A flashback shows Busch recalling his trip to the U.S. and the difficulty he faced in the form of both physical injury and rejection, but also his determination to brew beer. Back in the present, the same patron buys him a beer. Busch thanks him and shows him his plans to brew Budweiser. The patron then introduces himself as Eberhard Anheuser.

== Controversy ==
The commercial aired just days after President Donald Trump's executive order banning immigrants from Muslim countries. Anheuser-Busch was accused of creating the commercial in response to the ban and other of Trump's immigration policies. Anheuser-Busch said the commercial had nothing to do with recent policies or politics but about the American dream, pointing to the fact that production of the commercial took place long before any of the controversial immigration policies were in place.

== Reception ==
Born the Hard Way was first broadcast during Super Bowl LI but was released before the game. According to various media sources the advertisement was viewed over 2.5 million times in the first 24 hours after its release and 21.7 million in the first 72 hours. Opinion on social media was mixed. Some viewed the advertisement in light of the Muslim ban and praised Anheuser-Busch for pointing out that the United States is a country of immigrants. Others who supported Trump and his immigration policies vowed never to drink Budweiser again, some going so far as to call for a boycott of Budweiser and Anheuser-Busch.

== See also ==
- Super Bowl commercials
- Executive Order 13769
