= So God Made a Farmer =

Speech given by Paul Harvey at the 1978 Future Farmers of America convention

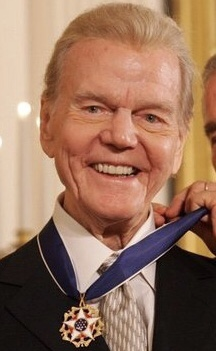
Paul Harvey, the deliverer of the "So God Made a Farmer" speech

"So God Made a Farmer" was a speech given by radio broadcaster Paul Harvey at the 1978 Future Farmers of America convention. The speech was first published in 1986 in Harvey's syndicated column. The speech borrowed a few phrases from a 1975 article written by Harvey in the Gadsden Times, which was itself inspired by parts of a 1940 definition of a dirt farmer published in The Farmer-Stockman. The 1940 article was copied verbatim by Tex Smith in a letter to the editor in the Ellensburg Daily Record in 1949. The speech was given as an extension of the Genesis creation narrative referring to God's actions on the 8th day of creation. Harvey described the characteristics of a farmer in each phrase, ending them with the recurring "So God Made a Farmer".

The speech was used in a commercial by Ram Trucks during the fourth quarter of Super Bowl XLVII. The ad featured photographs of rural America set to a narration of a portion of Harvey's speech. In a collaboration with the FFA, Dodge agreed to donate $100,000 for every 1,000,000 views that the YouTube video of the ad received up to $1,000,000. This goal was reached in less than five days.

== The speech ==
Paul Harvey, delivering the quoted portion of the speech not in the Ram ad

Paul Harvey delivered the speech at an FFA convention in 1978. His speech began as a continuation of the Genesis creation narrative referring to the actions God took on the eighth day. In it, Harvey stated that God needed a caretaker for the land he created. The speech continues with God expressing the characteristics needed by the person he is creating:

"I need somebody with arms strong enough to wrestle a calf and yet gentle enough to deliver his own grandchild; somebody to call hogs, tame cantankerous machinery, come home hungry, have to await lunch until his wife's done feeding visiting ladies, then tell the ladies to be sure and come back real soon, and mean it." (Note: This section of the speech was not included in the Ram full-size pickup ad.)

— Paul Harvey,

Multiple passages setting out characteristics of the sort end with the same refrain, by which the speech is now known: "So God made a farmer."

Harvey's "So God Made a Farmer" speech was characterized, according to The Atlantic, by its "folksy timbre". The New York Times spoke further on elements of his speaking style in its 2009 obituary: "his style was stop-and-go, with superb pacing and silences that rivaled Jack Benny's. He spoke directly to the listener, with punchy sentences, occasional exclamations of "Good heavens!" or "Oh, my goodness!" and pauses that squeezed out the last drop of suspense: the radio broadcaster's equivalent of the raised eyebrow or the knowing grin." Bob Greene described the opening phrase of the speech as "seemingly simple, and devastatingly direct".

The speech also ran in Paul Harvey's syndicated newspaper column in 1986. Both the sound recording of the speech and the text of the article have been federally registered with the U.S. Copyright Office by Paulynne, Inc., Paul Harvey's company that is now owned by his son. In an introduction, Harvey claimed, in a typical rhetorical flourish, that he had found the essay in his mailbag:

"This next arrived unsigned in my mailbag. I've tried but cannot trace its source. A farmer, perhaps; more likely a farmer's wife. I've embellished the essay in places and cropped it in others but I hope the sense of it remains intact."

— Paul Harvey, 1986

=== Prior versions ===
Paul Harvey ran a similar article in the column "A Point of View" for the Gadsden Times on August 26, 1975. Entitled "What it is to be a farmer", the article did not contain the concept of God creating the farmer seen in his 1978 speech, but he still described the characteristics of a farmer. Many of the same phrases made their way into his 1978 speech. The 1975 column was largely similar to a definition of a dirt farmer given by Boston B. Blackwood from Hartshorne, Oklahoma in a 1940 copy of The Farmer-Stockman. This was copied verbatim in a September 10, 1949 letter to the editor of the Ellensburg Daily Record written by Tex Smith from Ellensburg, Washington. Both the 1940 and 1975 columns share elements not included in the speech such as the statement that a farmer's wife won't let him starve. In the "So God Made a Farmer" speech and Harvey's 1986 column, only two phrases and a few words remain from Blackwood's 1940 piece including the phrase, "can shape an axe handle from a persimmon sprout".

== Super Bowl XLVII commercial ==
The speech was used in a two-minute Ram Trucks Super Bowl commercial entitled "Farmer" in 2013's Super Bowl XLVII. The ad featured a voiceover of Harvey's speech set to still photographs taken by ten photographers including William Albert Allard and Kurt Markus. Created by The Richards Group, the ad ran during the fourth quarter. It was noted for its religious imagery. The ad, like another Chrysler Super Bowl XLVII ad featuring Oprah Winfrey, advertised the brand without focusing on the vehicle. This was similar to ads run by Chrysler in Super Bowl XLVI and Super Bowl XLV.

The ad was made in collaboration with the National FFA Organization and with permission from Harvey's company, Paulynne, Inc. Ram agreed to donate up to $1,000,000 to the foundation based on the views received by the YouTube video. The goal, which was based on $100,000 for every 1,000,000 views, was reached in less than 5 days.

=== Reception ===
The ad received mostly positive reviews. Slate called it the "most striking Super Bowl ad" but also criticized it for being similar in concept to a 2011 YouTube video by Farms.com. While the Slate review was criticizing its originality, Farms.com released a statement reflecting their approval of the ad. While liveblogging the Super Bowl commercials for the Wall Street Journal, Cindy Gallop referred to it as the "Great American Super Bowl Commercial". Dale Buss, of Forbes, wrote "Chrysler managed to insert just enough of its vehicles and brands in each spot so as to make their inclusion seem part of the fabric of the paean, not at all intrusive, thereby lending the kind of authenticity to Ram and Jeep that fuels long-term brand success". The ad ranked third in the USA Today Super Bowl Ad Meter. Critics noted that the ad focused on the family farm despite the industrialization of agriculture in America. A Latino nonprofit organization called Cuéntame uploaded a remake to its Facebook page that featured more Latinos.

Country music singer James Wesley's 2013 single "Thank a Farmer" was inspired by the ad.
