= Puppy Monkey Baby =

2016 advertisement

Puppy Monkey Baby (also styled PuppyMonkeyBaby) is the name of a puppeteered character created by Mountain Dew for a TV commercial that aired on February 7, 2016, during Super Bowl 50. The PuppyMonkeyBaby character was voiced by actor Ryan Alosio. The advertisement has garnered a wide amount of media coverage, both positive and negative. According to iSpot.tv, the spot was rated #1 of all the Super Bowl commercials of the night, having generated 2.2 million online views and 300,000 social media interactions after airing.

Mountain Dew revived Puppy Monkey Baby for an advertisement in 2022. The ad was part of a campaign that Mountain Dew hoped would capitalize on Gen Z favor towards self-referential formats. In 2025, the Puppy Monkey Baby reappeared in a Instacart commercial during the Super Bowl.

== Description ==
The ad features a mashup of three things that the public generally finds to be cute or harmless, all in one body: a Pug puppy (the head), a monkey (the torso and tail) and a dancing baby (the hips and legs, complete with a diaper). Puppy Monkey Baby repeats its name while dancing with three men who are presumably too tired to get out while watching the Super Bowl, offering them Mountain Dew Kickstart, which is similarly described as being a combination of three things (Mountain Dew, juice, and caffeine).

== Reception ==
The media response to the advertisement was mixed. Melissa Cronin of Gawker, described it as a "horror-hallucination of brand awareness", while noting the beverage itself contains brominated vegetable oil (BVO), a chemical that is banned in several countries. Jim Joseph, chief integrated marketing officer at Cohn & Wolfe, called it "weird". Screwattack declared Puppy Monkey Baby the most terrifying mascot of all time.
