= Doug Limerick =

American radio personality (born 1944)

- Born: 5 August 1944 (age 81); Shelby, North Carolina, U.S.
- Occupation: Radio host

Doug Limerick is an American radio personality. He has been a news correspondent for ABC Radio Networks since 1982.

== Career ==
Limerick, a native of Shelby, North Carolina, started his career working the night shift, playing Top 40 music at WOHS radio while still in high school in the early 1960s.

He majored in speech at Wake Forest University and then joined the United States Air Force where he worked as a Russian linguist.

His broadcast career included stations in Monroe, Birmingham and Charlotte. His big break came at WKIX in Raleigh, where he was the morning news editor. He was also morning news editor and anchor at WHDH in Boston, Massachusetts, during the 1970s.

After WHDH, he went to WRQX in Washington, D.C., and also worked as the weekend weatherman for WJLA TV.

Limerick joined ABC Radio Networks in April 1982 as an anchor-correspondent.

While at ABC News Radio, he subbed for the broadcaster Paul Harvey for nearly a decade.

During his career he interviewed Bob Hope, George Wallace, Spiro Agnew, Roy Rogers, Tom Clancy, Paul Harvey, and many more. Limerick won two Edward R. Murrow news awards.

Limerick announced his retirement from broadcasting on December 18, 2015.

== Family ==
Limerick lives in Fairfax Station, Virginia. He is married and has three daughters and five grandchildren.
