= The Rest of the Story =

American radio program (1976–2009)

The Rest of the Story was a Monday-through-Saturday radio program hosted by Paul Harvey. The phrase "and now you know the rest of the story" was a part of his newscasts even before the Second World War and then inspired its own series on the ABC Radio Networks, which premiered on May 10, 1976. The Rest of the Story consisted of true stories, by and large forgotten, based on a variety of subjects with some key element of the story (often the name of some well-known person) held back until the end. The broadcasts always concluded with a variation on the tag line, "And now you know... the rest of the story." On the majority of radio stations, it often served as a mid-afternoon drive counterpart to Harvey's morning and noontime News and Comment but frequently aired twice a day.

The series was created, produced, and written by Harvey's son Paul Harvey Jr., who in later years of his father's career also acted as a substitute host. Only they were permitted to voice the show. Some of the radio stories were published in book form as Paul Harvey's The Rest of the Story, More of Paul Harvey's The Rest of the Story, and Destiny from Paul Harvey's The Rest of the Story. The series ended after thirty-three years on the air following the elder Harvey's death on February 28, 2009.

On June 23, 2025, Paulynne, Inc., which owns and controls all of Harvey's intellectual property, sued Paramount Global in New York federal court. The company sued Paramount for using a 90 second audio clip from The Rest of the Story in the Paramount+ TV show Landman without permission. Paramount used a segment about rising gas prices from Harvey's 2009 "Gas Crisis" episode in the opening of Landman's Season 1 finale. The lawsuit accused Paramount of failing to obtain permission to use the clip as well as editing the clip to change Harvey's viewpoint with regard to government fossil-fuel policies and his interest in alternative fuels.

The lawsuit was voluntarily dismissed with prejudice on March 2, 2026 when the parties settled for a six figure sum.

== General and cited references ==
- Aurandt (Harvey), Paul Jr. (1984). Paul Harvey's The Rest of the Story. New York: Bantam Books. ISBN 0-553-25962-8.
