= Gil Gross =

American radio personality

- Occupation: Radio host

Gil Gross is an American radio personality. He most recently hosted a weekday radio talk show on KKSF Talk 910 in Oakland/San Francisco from 10 a.m. to 2 p.m., as well as the syndicated Real Estate Today program on Saturdays. However, that station flipped formats to Spanish language sports on July 23, 2016. He was a news correspondent for the ABC Radio Networks. From 2007 to late 2011 he hosted a show on KGO AM in San Francisco, California, on weekday afternoons. He replaced the San Francisco newscaster Pete Wilson (not to be confused with the California governor of the same name) after his death in 2007 as host of the radio show on KGO.

== Career ==
Gross' first on air radio job was at WDZ while he was a student at Millikin University in Decatur, Illinois. At age 23, he became the youngest anchorman ever on ABC Radio, while at the same time doing WLS morning news in Chicago. He won awards for investigative reporting, mainly about children. Other awards were given for the attempt on the life of Pope John Paul II and the intifada in Jerusalem.

Gross anchored ABC coverage of the September 11 attacks, the execution of Timothy McVeigh, and the Iraq War. He also anchored the Atlanta Olympics bombing. (longform ABC News)

Gross has worked for WABC, WCBS and WOR in New York City; KLAC in Los Angeles; WMAL in Washington, D.C.; and WWDB in Philadelphia. Gross was also the host of The Gil Gross Show, a call-in show that aired on the CBS Radio Network and had guests who included Bill Clinton and Margaret Thatcher from the political world and entertainers Brian Wilson and Marilyn Manson. While at CBS, he substituted for Charles Osgood.

Gross has written comedy material for Don Imus and Ted Brown.

Gross was the main substitute host for Paul Harvey on the radio show Paul Harvey's News & Comment. Gross was offered Harvey's slot along with Doug Limerick after Harvey's death, but turned it down when Citadel Broadcasting offered a cut of revenue instead of salary. He filled in for 13 weeks so they could find a replacement, which they did in actor/politician Fred Thompson.

He currently does specials for CBS News Radio and is an actor based in New Mexico.

== Family ==
Gross is married to actress-singer Rhoda Bodzin. They have one son and three cats. Gross has a collection of 10,000 LPs and CDs.
