= Paul Harvey =

American radio broadcaster (1918–2009)

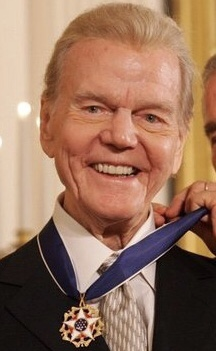
- Harvey receiving the Presidential Medal of Freedom in 2005
- Born: Paul Harvey Aurandt; September 4, 1918; Tulsa, Oklahoma, U.S.
- Died: February 28, 2009 (aged 90); Phoenix, Arizona, U.S.
- Resting place: Forest Home Cemetery, Forest Park, Illinois, U.S.
- Education: University of Tulsa
- Years active: 1938–2008
- Spouse: Lynne "Angel" Cooper Harvey (m. 1940; died 2008)
- Children: Paul Harvey Jr.
- Awards: Presidential Medal of Freedom
- Presenting career
- Show: The Rest of the Story; Paul Harvey News and Comment
- Network: ABC Radio Networks
- Military career
- Allegiance: United States
- Branch: U.S. Army Air Forces
- Service years: 1943−1944
- Conflicts: World War II

Paul Harvey Aurandt (September 4, 1918 – February 28, 2009) was an American radio broadcaster for ABC News Radio. He broadcast News and Comment on mornings and mid-days on weekdays and at noon on Saturdays and also his famous The Rest of the Story segments. From 1951 to 2008, his programs reached as many as 24 million people per week. Paul Harvey News was carried on 1,350 commercial radio stations, on 400 American Forces Network stations, and in 300 newspapers.

== Early life ==
Harvey was born in Tulsa, Oklahoma, on September 4, 1918, and was the son of a policeman who was killed by robbers in 1921. He made radio receivers as a young boy, and attended Tulsa Central High School, where he was two years ahead of future actor Tony Randall. Teacher Isabelle Ronan was "impressed by his voice". On her recommendation, he started working at KVOO in Tulsa in 1933 helping to clean up when he was 14. He eventually was allowed to fill in on the air by reading commercials and the news.

He continued working at KVOO while he attended the University of Tulsa, first as an announcer and later as a program director. He spent three years as a station manager for KFBI, a Wichita, Kansas radio station that once had studios in Salina, Kansas. From there, he moved to a newscasting job at KOMA in Oklahoma City, and then to KXOK in St. Louis in 1938 where he was Director of Special Events and a roving reporter.

== Career ==
=== World War II ===
Harvey then moved to Hawaii to cover the U.S. Navy as it concentrated its fleet in the Pacific after the Japanese attack on Pearl Harbor. He eventually enlisted in the U.S. Army Air Forces but only served from December 1943 to March 1944 resulting from a medical discharge. He then moved to Chicago, where in June 1944, he began broadcasting from the ABC affiliate WENR.

=== Career in Chicago ===
In 1945, he began hosting the postwar employment program Jobs for G.I. Joe on WENR. Harvey added The Rest of the Story as a tagline to in-depth feature stories in 1946. One of Harvey's regular topics was lax security, particularly at Argonne National Laboratory, a nuclear research facility 20 miles (32 km) southwest of Chicago. To demonstrate his concern, just after midnight on February 6, 1951, he entered the grounds by scaling a fence and was quickly apprehended by security guards. In 2010, The Washington Post, having obtained 1400 pages of the FBI file on Harvey, described it as an "act of participatory journalism." (Note: Harvey guided his black Cadillac Fleetwood toward Argonne, arriving sometime past midnight. He parked in a secluded spot, tossed his overcoat onto the barbed wire topping a fence, then scampered over.... Harvey['s plan was] to scratch his signature on 'objects that could not possibly have been brought to the site by someone else,' according to a statement later given by an off-duty guard who accompanied him.... But seconds after Harvey hit the ground, security officers spotted him.... Harvey ran until, caught in a Jeep's headlights, he tripped and fell. As guards approached, Harvey sprang to his feet and waved. Guards asked whether Harvey realized he was in a restricted area. Harvey replied no, that he thought he might be at the airport because of the red lights.... Harvey told the authorities he had been headed to a neighboring town to give a speech when his car died.... Under questioning, Harvey eventually dropped his cover story but refused to elaborate, saying he wanted to tell his tale before a congressional committee. Guards searched his Cadillac and found... a four-page, typewritten script for an upcoming broadcast. Harvey, it turned out, had planned from the outset to feed the nation a bogus account of his escapade: "I hereby affirm the following is a true and accurate account," the script began. "My friend and I were driving a once-familiar road, when the car stalled.... We started to walk.... We made no effort to conceal our presence.... Suddenly I realized where I was. That I had entered, unchallenged, one of the United States' vital atomic research installations.... Quite by accident, understand, I had found myself inside the 'hot' area.... We could have carried a bomb in, or classified documents out.) Harvey's "escapade" prompted the U.S. attorney for Illinois to empanel a grand jury to consider an espionage indictment. Harvey "went on the air to suggest he was being set up," and the grand jury subsequently declined to indict Harvey.

=== Going national ===
Harvey had done sporadic work from Chicago for ABC Radio in the late 1940s and early 1950s and had just completed two weeks as the guest host for veteran commentator H. R. Baukhage on his daily 11 AM news round-up. When Baukhage returned from his early spring vacation, ABC dismissed him, and put Harvey on in his place. A good friend of Harvey's, Frank M Baker, was a key figure in helping negotiate a contract with ABC. Baker was no stranger to Chicago's radio scene as an announcer at the Edgewater Beach Hotel. Frank and Paul were close friends for the rest of their lives. April 1, 1951, the ABC Radio Network debuted Paul Harvey News and Comment, with a noon time slot on weekdays. His network television debut came on November 16, 1952, when he began a 15-minute newscast on ABC. The program originated at WENR-TV in Chicago.

Later Harvey began to host a separate program, The Rest of the Story, in which he provided backstories behind famous people and events. The Rest of the Story premiered on May 10, 1976, on ABC Radio. The series quickly grew to six broadcasts a week and continued until his death in 2009. It was written and produced by his son, Paul Harvey Jr., from its outset and for its 33-year duration. Harvey and his radio network stated that the stories in that series, although entertaining, were completely true. That was contested by some critics, including urban legend expert Jan Harold Brunvand.

In November 2000, Harvey signed a 10-year $100 million contract with ABC Radio Networks. A few months later, after damaging his vocal cords, he went off the air, but returned in August 2001.

His success with sponsors stemmed from the seamlessness with which he segued from his monologue into reading commercial messages. He explained his relationship with them: "I am fiercely loyal to those willing to put their money where my mouth is."

=== Fill-in hosts ===
Former US Senator Fred Thompson substituted for Harvey regularly from 2006 to 2007. Other substitutes for Harvey included his son, Paul Harvey Jr., Paul W. Smith, Gil Gross, Ron Chapman, Mitt Romney, Mike Huckabee, Mort Crim, Scott Shannon, Joe Holstead, and Tony Snow. Three weeks after Harvey's death, the News and Comment franchise was canceled.

Harvey did not host the show full-time after April 2008, when he came down with pneumonia. Shortly after his recovery, his wife died on May 3, which caused him to prolong his time away from broadcasting. He voiced commercials and new episodes of The Rest of the Story and News & Comment during middays a few times a week, with his son handling mornings.

=== Aviation ===
Harvey was an avid pilot who served in the U.S. Army Air Corps from December 1943 to March 1944. He was an Aircraft Owners and Pilots Association (AOPA) member for more than 50 years and would occasionally talk about flying to his radio audience. He was also a member of the Experimental Aircraft Association (EAA) and was frequently seen at EAA AirVenture in Oshkosh, Wisconsin. He was responsible for funding the Paul Harvey Audio-Video Center at EAA's headquarters in Oshkosh. Harvey was also an early investor in aircraft manufacturing company Cirrus Aircraft, based in Duluth, Minnesota. According to the AOPA Pilot contributing editor Barry Schiff, Harvey coined the term skyjack.

== On-air persona ==
Harvey's on-air persona was influenced by sportscaster Bill Stern and columnist Walter Winchell. In the 1940s, Stern's The Colgate Sports Reel and newsreel programs used many of the techniques later used by Harvey, including his emphatic style of delivery and the use of phrases such as Reel Two and Reel Three to denote segments of the broadcast, much like Harvey's Page Two and Page Three.

Harvey was also known for the catchphrases that he used at the beginning of his programs, such as "Hello Americans, this is Paul Harvey. Stand by for NEWS!" He always ended, "Paul Harvey... Good day." or "Paul Harvey... Good night." A story might be "This day's news of most lasting significance." At the end of a report about someone who had done something ridiculous or offensive, Harvey would say, "He would want us to mention his name," followed by silence, and he would then start the next item. The last item of a broadcast, which was often a funny story, would usually be preceded by "And now from the 'For-what-it's-worth' department...."

Other phrases made famous by Harvey included "Here's a strange..." (a story with an unusual twist) and "Self-government won't work without self-discipline." He also is credited with popularizing the terms Reaganomics and guesstimate.

In addition to the inquiry into whether Harvey's Rest of the Story tales are true, Harvey's trademark ability of seamlessly migrating from content to commercial brought scrutiny. In that context, Salon magazine called him the "finest huckster ever to roam the airwaves." Some have argued that Harvey's fawning and lavish product endorsements may have been misleading or confusing to his audience. Harvey's endorsed products included EdenPure heaters, Bose radios, Select Comfort mattresses, Wells Lamont gloves, and Hi-Health dietary supplements, including a supplement that was claimed to improve vision but was later the subject of a Federal Trade Commission enforcement action against the manufacturer (but not Harvey himself) for misleading claims made on his show. In one of the tribute broadcasts, Gil Gross said that Harvey considered advertising just another type of news and that he endorsed only products that he believed in, often by interviewing someone from the company.

== Personal views ==
Beginning in 1952, Harvey was a friend of FBI Director J. Edgar Hoover. Harvey would often submit "advance copies of his radio script for comment and approval." Harvey's friendship with Hoover may have helped him escape criminal charges relating to his trespassing at Argonne National Laboratory. Harvey was happy to defend Hoover and spoke of him on his show of April 25, 1963: "God help the United States without John Edgar Hoover.... (FBI) Director Hoover is not retiring. If you have heard otherwise, somebody's sinister wish was the father of that thought. It is not so."

Harvey was also a close friend of US Senator Joseph McCarthy and supported his campaign to expose and expel communists from American society and government.

Harvey was also a close friend of George Vandeman and the Reverend Billy Graham. From the mid-1970s to the mid-1980s, Harvey attended Calvary Memorial Church in Oak Park, Illinois. When the church moved from its original location on Madison Street to the former Presbyterian Church on Lake Street, Harvey asked Graham to preach at the dedication service. Harvey associated with various congregations of different denominations. He and his wife regularly attended the Camelback Adventist Church in Scottsdale, Arizona, during his winters there. He often quoted the Adventist pioneer Ellen G. White in his broadcasts and received the "Golden Microphone" Award for his professionalism and graciousness in dealing with the church. He was also active with a small Plymouth Brethren meeting in Maywood, Illinois, called Woodside Bible Chapel.

== Rhetorical style ==
Robert D. McFadden, writing Harvey's obituary for The New York Times, examined his unique radio style and how it interacted with his political views:

[He] personalized the radio news with his right wing opinions, but laced them with his own trademarks: a hypnotic timbre, extended pauses for effect, heart-warming tales of average Americans and folksy observations that evoked the heartland, family values and the old-fashioned plain talk one heard around the dinner table on Sunday.

"Hello, Americans," he barked. "This is Paul Harvey! Stand byyy for newwws!"

He railed against welfare cheats and defended the death penalty. He worried about the national debt, big government, bureaucrats who lacked common sense, permissive parents, leftist radicals and America succumbing to moral decay. He championed rugged individualism, love of God and country, and the fundamental decency of ordinary people.

== Awards ==
Harvey was elected to the National Association of Broadcasters National Radio Hall of Fame and Oklahoma Hall of Fame, and appeared on the Gallup poll list of America's most admired men. In addition he received 11 Freedom Foundation Awards as well as the Horatio Alger Award. Harvey was named to the DeMolay Hall of Fame, a Masonic youth organization, on June 25, 1993.

In 1993, Harvey was awarded one of the prestigious Peabody Awards.

In 2005, he was awarded the Presidential Medal of Freedom, the United States' most prestigious civilian award, by President George W. Bush. Bush's remarks summarized Harvey's career: "He first went on the air in 1933, and he's been heard nationwide for 54 years. Americans like the sound of his voice...over the decades we have come to recognize in that voice some of the finest qualities of our country: patriotism, the good humor, the kindness, and common sense of Americans."

On May 18, 2007, he received an honorary degree from Washington University in St. Louis.

In 1992 he received the Paul White Award of the Radio Television Digital News Association

Paul Harvey was inducted as a Laureate of The Lincoln Academy of Illinois and awarded the Order of Lincoln (the State's highest honor) by the Governor of Illinois in 1987 in the area of Communication.

== Family ==
Harvey was born and raised in Tulsa, Oklahoma, the son of Harry Harrison Aurandt (1873–1921) and Anna Dagmar (née Christensen) Aurandt (1883–1960). His father was born in Martinsburg, Pennsylvania; his mother was Danish. He had one sibling, an older sister Frances Harrietta (née Aurandt) Price (1908–1988).

In December 1921, when Harvey was three years old, his father was murdered. The elder Aurandt was a Tulsa policeman who served as secretary to Commissioner J.H. Adkinson. On the night of December 18, Officer Aurandt and a friend, Tulsa police detective Ike Wilkerson, were off-duty and rabbit hunting when they were approached by four masked and armed men who attempted to rob them. Mr. Aurandt was shot and died two days later of his wounds. A large-scale manhunt resulted in the arrest of four suspects the day after Aurandt died. A lynch mob of 1,000 people formed at the jail, but the suspects were smuggled out. Two of them would be convicted of murder and sentenced to life terms following identification by Detective Wilkerson, who said that he knew the men and was able to recognize them despite their masks. At Aurandt's funeral, twelve robed members of the Ku Klux Klan arrived late in the service and dropped roses on his casket, though there is no other indication that Aurandt was himself a Klansman.

In 1940, Harvey married Lynne Cooper of St. Louis. She was inducted into Phi Beta Kappa at Washington University in St. Louis and a former schoolteacher. They met when Harvey was working at KXOK and Cooper came to the station for a school news program. Harvey invited her to dinner, proposed to her after a few minutes of conversation and from then on called her "Angel," even on his radio show. A year later she said yes. The couple moved to Chicago in 1944.

On May 17, 2007, Harvey told his radio audience that Angel had developed leukemia. Her death, at the age of 92, was announced by ABC radio on May 3, 2008. When she died at their River Forest home, the Chicago Sun-Times described her as, "More than his astute business partner and producer, she also was a pioneer for women in radio and an influential figure in her own right for decades." According to the founder of the Museum of Broadcast Communications, Bruce DuMont, "She was to Paul Harvey what Colonel Parker was to Elvis Presley. She really put him on track to have the phenomenal career that his career has been."

Lynne Harvey was the first producer inducted into the Radio Hall of Fame, and had developed some of her husband's best-known features, such as The Rest of the Story. While working on her husband's radio show, she established 10 p.m. as the hour in which news is broadcast. She was the first woman to receive a lifetime achievement award from the Chicago chapter of American Women in Radio and Television. She worked in television also, and created a television show called Dilemma which is acknowledged as the prototype of the modern talk show genre. While working at CBS, she was among the first women to produce an entire newscast. In later years, she was best known as a philanthropist.

They had one son, Paul Aurandt Jr., who goes by the name Paul Harvey Jr. He assisted his father at News and Comment and The Rest of the Story. Paul, Jr., whose voice announced the bumpers between episodes, filled in for his father during broadcasts and broadcast the morning editions after the passing of his mother.

== Death and tributes ==
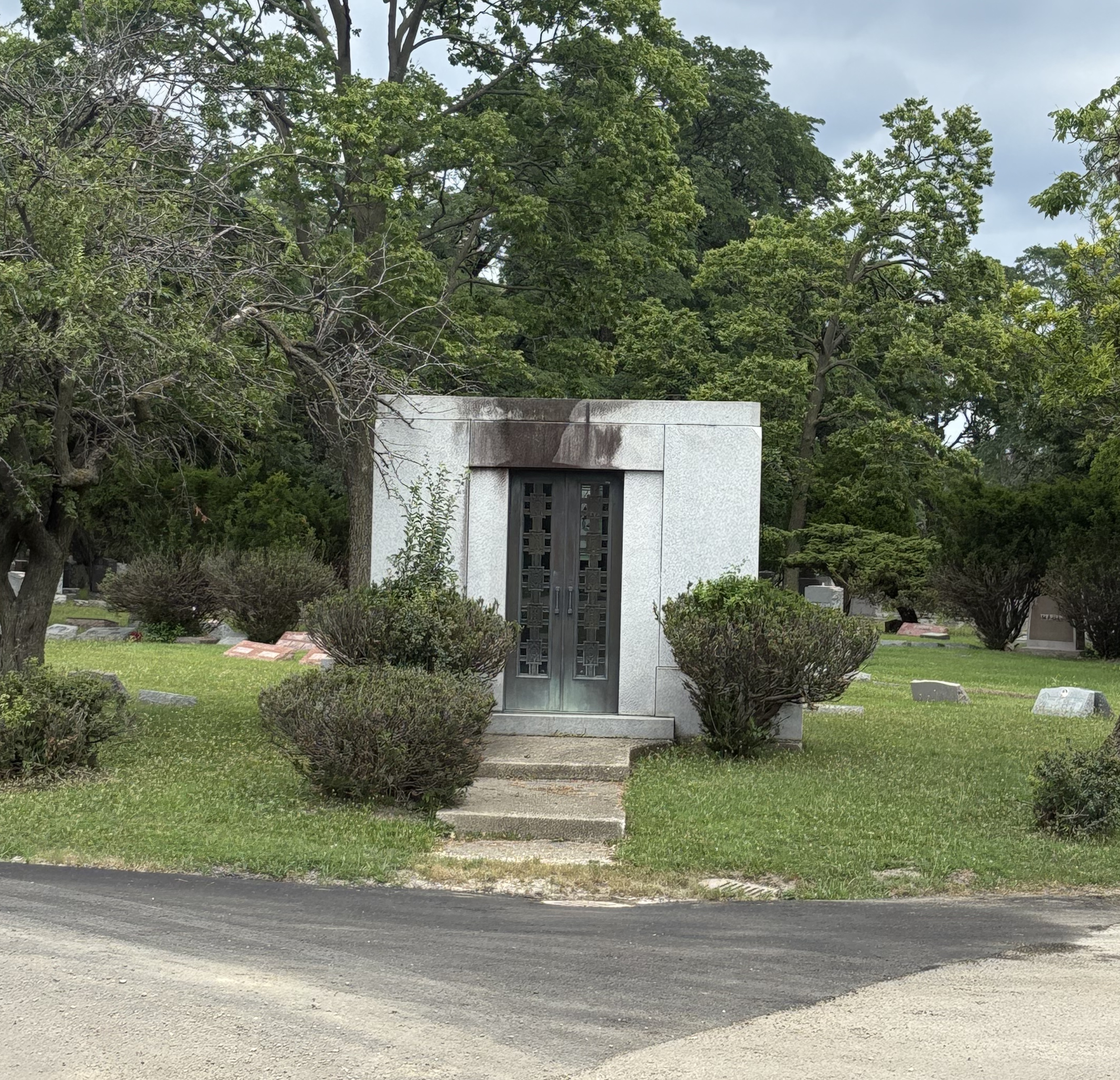
Harvey mausoleum at Forest Home Cemetery

Harvey died on February 28, 2009, at age 90 at a hospital in Phoenix, Arizona, surrounded by family and friends. No cause of death was announced. In response to his father's death, his son, Paul Harvey Jr., said, "Millions have lost a friend". At the time of his death, he had less than two years left on his ten-year contract. Former President George W. Bush issued a statement on Harvey's death, calling him "a friendly and familiar voice in the lives of millions of Americans."

Harvey was interred at Forest Home Cemetery in Forest Park, Illinois.

On March 4, Gil Gross was chosen to be the interim host of News & Comment, and weekday and Saturday broadcasts. News & Comment was replaced the following week by Mike Huckabee's existing commentary, The Huckabee Report, which ceased radio distribution in 2015.

Harvey's full-length biography, Good Day! The Paul Harvey Story, was published in May 2009 by Regnery Publishing.

On February 3, 2013, a recording of Harvey's "So God Made a Farmer" commentary was used by Ram Trucks in a commercial titled "Farmer," which aired during Super Bowl XLVII.

On June 23, 2025, Paulynne, Inc., which owns and controls all of Harvey's intellectual property, sued Paramount Global in New York federal court. The company sued Paramount for using a 90-second audio clip from The Rest of the Story in the Paramount+ TV show Landman without permission. Paramount used a segment about rising gas prices from Harvey’s 2009 "Gas Crisis" episode in the opening of Landman's Season 1 finale. The lawsuit accused Paramount of failing to obtain permission to use the clip as well as editing the clip to change Harvey's viewpoint with regard to government fossil-fuel policies and his interest in alternative fuels.

== Works ==
- Remember These Things. Chicago: The Heritage Foundation, 1952
- Autumn of Liberty. Garden City, New York: Hanover House, 1954.
- The Rest of the Story. Garden City, New York: Hanover House, 1956.
- Our Lives, Our Fortunes, Our Sacred Honor. Waco, Texas: Word Books, 1975.
- Paul Harvey's The Rest of the Story. Garden City, N.Y.: Doubleday, 1977. ISBN 0-385-12768-5
- More of Paul Harvey's The Rest of the Story. New York: William Morrow, 1980, ISBN 0-688-03669-4
- Destiny: From Paul Harvey's The Rest of the Story. New York: William Morrow, 1983, ISBN 0-688-02205-7
- Paul Harvey's For What It's Worth. New York: Bantam Books, 1991, ISBN 0-553-07720-1

== Notes ==
Media offices
Preceded by Show Established	Host of News and Comment (mornings); 1944–2008	Succeeded by Paul Harvey, Jr.
