= List of songs written by Brett James =

This is a list of songs written or co-written by Brett James, an American songwriter. His credits include the Number One country hits "Who I Am" by Jessica Andrews, "Blessed" by Martina McBride, "When the Sun Goes Down" and "Out Last Night" by Kenny Chesney, "Jesus, Take the Wheel" by Carrie Underwood, "It's America" for Rodney Atkins and "The Truth" for Jason Aldean.

"Song" – Artist (Co-writers)

== 0-9 ==
- "90 Degrees and Freezing" – Chicago (Jay DeMarcus, Robert Lamm, Jason Scheff)

== A ==
- "After All" – Brett James (Chris Davis)
- "All the Crap I Do" – Mark Wills (John Bettis)
- "Always Be This Way" - Martina McBride (Martina McBride, Hillary Lindsey)
- "Always Sixteen" – Billy Ray Cyrus (Marty Dodson)
- "American Radio" – Carolina Rain (Dennis Matkosky)
- "At the End of the Day" – Kellie Coffey (Kellie Coffey)

== B ==
- "Baby, You're Right" – Phil Vassar (Phil Vassar)
- "The Bad in Me" – Jake Owen (Jake Owen, Jimmy Ritchey)
- "Big Cry" – Sara Evans (Angelo Petraglia, Hillary Lindsey)
- "Blessed" – Martina McBride (Hillary Lindsey, Troy Verges)
- "Bottoms Up" – Brantley Gilbert (Brantley Gilbert, Justin Weaver)
- "Bucket" — Kenny Chesney (Craig Wiseman)

== C ==
- "Chasin' Amy" – Brett James (Troy Verges)
- "Cheatin'" – Sara Evans (Don Schlitz)
- "Country Star" – Pat Green (Pat Green)
- "Cowboy Casanova" – Carrie Underwood (Carrie Underwood, Mike Elizondo)
- "Cowboy Girl" – Lonestar (Bill Luther)
- "Crazy White Boy" – Mark Wills (Blair Daly)

== D ==
- "Dancin' for the Groceries" – Kenny Chesney (Don Schlitz)
- "Dark Side of the Moon" – Brett James
- "Days of Thunder" – Mark Wills (Aimee Mayo)
- "Don't Give Up on Me" – Jason Aldean (Troy Verges)
- "Drugs or Jesus" – Tim McGraw (Chris Lindsey, Aimee Mayo, Troy Verges)

== E ==
- "Enjoy the Ride" – Brett James

== F ==
- "Falling" - Trent Harmon (Dallas Davidson, Keith Urban)
- "Feels Just Like It Should" – Pat Green (Pat Green, Justin Pollard)
- "Female Bonding" – Brett James
- "Fingerprints" – Kellie Coffey (John Bettis)
- "Flat on the Floor" – Katrina Elam, Carrie Underwood (Ashley Monroe)
- "Flip Flop Summer" – Kenny Chesney
- "Follow Me Home" – Jamie O'Neal (Jamie O'Neal, Shaye Smith)
- "Footsteps of Our Fathers" – Pat Green (Pat Green)
- "From This Dream" – Little Big Town (Kevin Fisher)
- "Funny Thing About Love" - Lauren Alaina (Lauren Alaina, Luke Laird)

== G ==
- "Game On" – Carrie Underwood (Carrie Underwood, Chris DeStefano)
- "Get Off on the Pain" – Gary Allan (Bill Luther, Justin Weaver)
- "Grown Woman" – Jason Aldean (Hillary Lindsey)

== H ==
- "Hands on You" – Florida Georgia Line (Rodney Clawson, Chris Tompkins)
- "Hank" – Mark Wills (Bill Luther)
- "Heartache That Don't Stop Hurting" - Jason Aldean (Leslie Satcher)
- "The Heart of Dixie" – Danielle Bradbery (Troy Verges, Caitlyn Smith)
- "Helpless When She Smiles" – Backstreet Boys (Aimee Mayo, Chris Lindsey, Troy Verges)
- "Helplessly, Hopelessly" – Jessica Andrews (Troy Verges)
- "Here I Am" – Leona Lewis (Walter Afanasieff, Leona Lewis)
- "Hollywood, California" – Blue County (Tommy Lee James)

== I ==
- "I Don't Want To" – Ashley Monroe with Ronnie Dunn (Ashley Monroe)
- "I Don't Want to Live" – Josh Gracin, Chris Cagle (Blair Daly)
- "I Hold On" - Dierks Bentley (Dierks Bentley)
- "I Just Want to Love You" – Lonestar (Dean Sams)
- "I Love My Old Bird Dog (& I Love You Too)" – Crossin Dixon (Bill Luther)
- "I Love You This Big" - Scotty McCreery (Ronnie Jackson, Ester Dean, Jay Smith)
- "I Need a Man" – Crystal Shawanda (Hillary Lindsey, Aimee Mayo)
- "I Use What I Got" – Jason Aldean (Jim Collins)
- "I Want to Live" – Josh Gracin (Rivers Rutherford)
- "I Was Made for You" – Chris Cagle (Hillary Lindsey)
- "I Would" – Jolie & the Wanted (Troy Verges)
- "I've Forgotten You" – Michelle Wright, Rhonda Vincent (Hillary Lindsey, Angelo Petraglia, Troy Verges)
- "If I Could See Love" – Brett James (Steve Bogard)
- "Invisible" – Josh Gracin (Dillon Dixon)
- "It's a Business Doing Pleasure with You" – Tim McGraw (Chad Kroeger)
- "It's America" – Rodney Atkins (Angelo Petraglia)
- "Isabella" -- Dia Frampton

== J ==
- "Jesus, Take The Wheel" – Carrie Underwood (Hillary Lindsey, Gordie Sampson)
- "Just Like We Never Happened" – Brett James
- "Just to Say We Did" - Kenny Chesney - (Kenny Chesney, Matt Dragstrem, David Lee Murphy)

== K ==
- "Keep on Wanting" - The Fray, (The Fray)
- "Keg in the Closet" – Kenny Chesney (Kenny Chesney)
- "Kiss Me, Kiss Me, Kiss Me" – Kenny Chesney
- "Knowing You" – Kenny Chesney (Adam James, Kat Higgins)

== L ==
- "Life After You" – Daughtry (Chris Daughtry, Chad Kroeger, Joey Moi)
- "Little Bit Lonely" – Billy Currington (Blair Daly)
- "Livin' It Up" – Josh Gracin (Jodi Marr, Angelo Petraglia)
- "Long Lost Friend" – Chicago (Jay DeMarcus, Jason Scheff)
- "Look What I Found" – Chris Cagle (Don Schlitz)
- "Losing at Loving" – Blue County (Don Schlitz)
- "Lost Without You" – Pat Green (Pat Green)
- "Loved" - Lucy Hale (Lucy Hale, Caitlyn Smith)
- "Love Don't Have to Be So Hard" – Trent Willmon (Doug Johndon)
- "Love Is a Sweet Thing" – Faith Hill (Troy Verges)
- "The Love We Make" – Rodney Atkins (Troy Verges)
- "Love You Out Loud" – Rascal Flatts (Lonnie Wilson)
- "Love Wins" – Carrie Underwood (Carrie Underwood, David Garcia)

== M ==
- "Man Enough" – Jessica Simpson (Jessica Simpson, Troy Verges)
- "The Man I Want to Be" – Chris Young (Tim Nichols)
- "Many Tears Ago" – Brett James (Hunter Armistead)
- "Mine Is You" – Neal McCoy (Frank Rogers)
- "Mr. Know It All" - Kelly Clarkson (Ester Dean, Brian Kennedy, Dante Jones)
- "My Heart Move On" – Chris Cagle (Blair Daly)

== N ==
- "Never Love You Enough" – Chely Wright (Angelo Petraglia)
- "(No One's Gonna) Break Me Down" – Wynonna Judd (Angelo Petraglia, Hillary Lindsey)
- "No Place" – Backstreet Boys (Joshua Miller, Troy Verges)
- "Not Tonight" – Kristy Lee Cook (Chris Lindsey, Carrie Underwood)
- "November" – Emerson Drive (Angelo Petraglia)

== O ==
- "On My Highway" – Jason Aldean (Kelly Archer, Justin Weaver)
- "On My Way to You" – Cody Johnson (Tony Lane)
- "Once Upon a Broken Heart" – The Beu Sisters (Dean Grakal, Steven Greenberg)
- "One Trip" – Montgomery Gentry (Angelo Petraglia)
- "The One You Love"/"Todo Mi Amor" – Paulina Rubio (Troy Verges)
- "Out Last Night" – Kenny Chesney (Kenny Chesney)
- "Out Of My Head" - Theory of a Deadman (Brett James, Theory of a Deadman)

== P ==
- "Peace of Mind" – Josh Gracin (Troy Verges)
- "A Perfectly Good Heart" – Taylor Swift (Taylor Swift, Troy Verges)
- "Pray Out Loud" – Jessica Simpson (Jessica Simpson, John Shanks)

== R ==
- "Raincoat" – Kelly Sweet (Hillary Lindsey, Troy Verges, Angelo Petraglia)
- "Reality" - Kenny Chesney (Kenny Chesney)
- "Red Camaro" - Keith Urban (Keith Urban, Mike Elizondo)
- "Right Now" – Chad Brock (Joe Don Rooney, Sam Mullins)

== S ==
- "Save Us" – Keith Bryant (Dillon Dixon)
- "Say Yes" – Dusty Drake (Don Schlitz, Josh Turner)
- "Scars on This Guitar" – Bon Jovi (Jon Bon Jovi, Billy Falcon)
- "She's Killin' Me" – Brett James (Jennifer Kimball)
- "Sing" – Neal McCoy (Angelo Petraglia)
- "Somethin' Bad" – Miranda Lambert w/Carrie Underwood (Chris DeStefano, Priscilla Renea)
  - Later reworked as "Oh, Sunday Night," the opening theme for NBC Sunday Night Football
- "Something in the Water" – Carrie Underwood (Carrie Underwood, Chris DeStefano)
- "So Magical" – Martina McBride (Angelo Petraglia, Hillary Lindsey)
- "Spirit of a Storm" – Kenny Chesney (Kenny Chesney)
- "Start of Something Good" - Daughtry (Chris Daughtry)
- "Stay with Me (Brass Bed)" – Josh Gracin (Terry McBride, Jedd Hughes)
- "Still Beautiful" – Jessica Simpson (Jessica Simpson, John Shanks)
- "Still Don't Stop Me" – Jessica Simpson (Jessica Simpson, Hillary Lindsey)
- "Strange" – The Warren Brothers (Troy Verges)
- "Stubborn (Psalm 151)" – Lee Ann Womack (Don Schlitz)
- "Sugar and Daisies" – 3 of Hearts (Holly Lamar)
- "A Summer Day" – Shane Yellowbird (Chris Farren)
- "Summer Nights" – Rascal Flatts (busbee, Gary LeVox)
- "Summer of Love" - Martina McBride (Hillary Lindsey)
- "Swingin' Door" – Catherine Britt (Terry Clayton, Ashley Monroe)

== T ==
- "Tears and Time" – Andy Griggs (Terry Clayton, Kevin Mason)
- "Telluride" – Tim McGraw, Josh Gracin (Troy Verges)
- "Texas Plates" – Kellie Coffey (Kellie Coffey)
- "Things That You Say" – Jon McLaughlin (Jon McLaughlin, Troy Verges)
- "This Time" - Pia Toscano (B. Seals, Ester Dean, D. Jones)
- "This Mystery" (Troy Verges, Hilary Lindsey) Recorded in Dutch as "Lopen op het water" ("Walking on water") by Marco Borsato & Sita.
- "The One You Love" – Paulina Rubio (Troy Verges)
- "A Thousand Years" – Little Big Town (Brad Crisler)
- "Thrill of the Chase" – Brett James
- "Till We Ain't Strangers Anymore" – Bon Jovi with LeAnn Rimes (Jon Bon Jovi, Richie Sambora)
- "To Get to You" – Lorrie Morgan (Holly Lamar)
- "Touch of Grey" – Bon Jovi (Jon Bon Jovi, Billy Falcon)
- "Tremble" – Mindy McCready (Holly Lamar)
- "The Truth" – Trent Willmon, Jason Aldean (Ashley Monroe)
- "Tryin'" – Little Big Town, Pam Tillis (Troy Verges)
- "Turn It Up" – Josh Gracin (Thom McHugh)
- "Twisted" – Carrie Underwood (Luke Laird, Hillary Lindsey)

== U ==
- "Up All Night" — Kip Moore (Kip Moore)

== W ==
- "Wake Up and Smell the Whiskey" – Brett James, Dean Miller (Dean Miller)
- "Wal-Mart Parking Lot" – Chris Cagle
- "The Way That You Love" – Brett James
- "We Can't Do It Alone" – Van Zant (Donnie Van Zant, Johnny Van Zant)
- "What Do You Got?" - Bon Jovi (Jon Bon Jovi, Richie Sambora)
- "What the World Needs" – Wynonna Judd (Holly Lamar)
- "Wheels" – Josh Gracin (Fred Wilhelm)
- "When the Sun Goes Down" – Kenny Chesney and Uncle Kracker
- "When You Dance with Me" – Rushlow (Brad Crisler)
- "When You Love Me" – Jessica Andrews (Hillary Lindsey, Angelo Petraglia)
- "When You Think of Me" – Mark Wills (Troy Verges)
- "Who I Am" – Jessica Andrews (Troy Verges)
- "Wife and Kids" – Kenny Chesney (Jim Collins)
- "With Me" – Lonestar (Troy Verges)
- "Women Rule the World" – Lonestar (Dean Sams)
- "Worth the Fall" – Brett James

== Y ==
- "You Break Me" – 3 of Hearts (Troy Verges)
- "You Get to Me" – Mindy McCready (Troy Verges)
- "You Might Want to Think About It" – Chris Cagle (Troy Verges, Tom Shapiro)
- "You Save Me" – Kenny Chesney (Troy Verges)
- "You Still Take Me There" – Collin Raye (Thom McHugh, Del Gray)
- "You Were Just Here" – Jo Dee Messina (Hillary Lindsey, Troy Verges)
- "You Won't Be Lonely Now" – Billy Ray Cyrus (John Bettis)
- "Your Blues" – Little Texas (Angelo Petraglia)
- "You" – Meredith Edwards (Troy Verges)
