= Who I Am (Jessica Andrews album) =

Studio album by Jessica Andrews
- Released: February 27, 2001
- Genre: Country
- Length: 45:31
- Label: DreamWorks Nashville
- Producer: Byron Gallimore

Jessica Andrews chronology
Heart Shaped World (1999)	Who I Am (2001)	Now (2003)

Singles from Who I Am
- 1. "Who I Am" Released: October 30, 2000; 2. "Helplessly, Hopelessly" Released: May 28, 2001; 3. "Karma" Released: January 18, 2002

Professional ratings
Review scores
Source	Rating
AllMusic	4/5 stars

Who I Am is the second studio album of American country music singer Jessica Andrews, released on February 27, 2001. Her breakthrough album, it produced her first and only Number One hit on the country charts in its title track; "Karma" and "Helplessly, Hopelessly" were also released as singles. The album itself received RIAA gold certification for sales of 500,000 copies.

The title track was featured on the Disney Channel TV show, Lizzie McGuire and was used as the theme song of the PAX series Sue Thomas F.B.Eye.

"I Don't Like Anyone" was also recorded by the pop girl group Dream for their debut album It Was All a Dream, also released in 2001.

== Critical reception ==
Maria Konicki Dinoia reviewed the album for AllMusic and wrote, "Jessica Andrews delivers an impressive sophomore album. Upon first listen, it's easy to recognize her very maturing talent. Her vocals are strong and convincing, her songs are snappy and infectious, and there's little sign of her being just 17 years of age"

Richard Harrington of The Washington Post begins his review with, "ABOUT the only way you'd know for sure that Jessica Andrews is still a teenager is her favoring the word "awesome." The newly minted 17-year-old uses it to describe her feelings about "Who I Am" topping Billboard's country music singles chart (which it did for four weeks) and her similarly titled album rising as far as No. 2 and rapidly approaching platinum status."

== Track listing ==
No.	Title	Writer(s)	Length
1.	"Now I Know"	Chuck Giscombe; Miklós Malek; Jason Sellers	3:43
2.	"Every Time"	Hillary Lindsey; Tia Sillers	4:04
3.	"I Don't Like Anyone"	Martin Briley; Dana Calitri; Andy Marvel	4:00
4.	"Karma"	Marv Green; Aimee Mayo	3:19
5.	"Helplessly, Hopelessly"	Brett James; Troy Verges	3:59
6.	"Who I Am"	James; Verges	4:15
7.	"These Wings"	John Bettis; Robin Lee Bruce; Trina Harmon	3:36
8.	"Never Had It So Good"	Troy Lancaster; Melba Montgomery; Tommy Polk	3:30
9.	"Make Me Love You"	Tom Shapiro; Sharon Vaughn; Wally Wilson	4:01
10.	"Wishing Well"	Annie Roboff; Phil Vassar	3:14
11.	"Good Friend to Me"	Jessica Andrews; Bekka Bramlett; Roboff	3:30
12.	"Show Me Heaven"	Maria McKee; Eric Rackin; Jay Rifkin	4:20
Total length:			45:31

== Personnel ==
- Jessica Andrews – lead vocals, background vocals
- Bekka Bramlett – background vocals
- Mike Brignardello – bass guitar
- Paul Franklin – steel guitar, Dobro
- Aubrey Haynie – fiddle, mandolin
- Michael Landau – electric guitar
- B. James Lowry – electric guitar
- Brent Mason – electric guitar
- Jerry McPherson – electric guitar
- Gene Miller – background vocals
- Steve Nathan – piano, organ
- Kim Parent – background vocals
- Chris Rodriguez – background vocals
- Biff Watson – acoustic guitar
- Lonnie Wilson – drums
- Glenn Worf – bass guitar

== Chart performance ==
=== Weekly charts ===
Chart (2001)	Peak position
US Billboard 200	22
US Top Country Albums (Billboard)	2

=== Year-end charts ===
Chart (2001)	Position
Canadian Country Albums (Nielsen SoundScan)	26
US Billboard 200	164
US Top Country Albums (Billboard)	18
Chart (2002)	Position
US Top Country Albums (Billboard)	65

=== Singles ===
Year	Single	Peak chart positions		
Year	Single	US Country	US	US AC
2000	"Who I Am"	1	28	24
2001	"Helplessly, Hopelessly"	31	—	—
2002	"Karma"	47	—	—

== Certification ==
Region	Certification	Certified units/sales
United States (RIAA)	Gold	500,000^{^}
^{^} Shipments figures based on certification alone.
