= Sue Thomas =

Sue Thomas may refer to:

- Sue Thomas (FBI specialist) (1950–2022), deaf specialist for the United States Federal Bureau of Investigation
  - Sue Thomas: F.B.Eye, a television show based on her life
- Susan Thomas, Baroness Thomas of Walliswood (1935–2023)
- Sue Thomas (author) (born 1951), English author
- Susan Thomas (judge), chief judge (since 2020) of the High Court of New Zealand
