= Doc (2001 TV series) =

American TV series or program (2001–2004)

- Genre: Medical drama
- Created by: Dave Alan Johnson; Gary R. Johnson
- Starring: Billy Ray Cyrus; Derek McGrath; Richard Leacock; Andrea C. Robinson; Ron Lea; Tyler Posey; Tracy Shreve; Ruth Marshall; Paula Boudreau
- Theme music composer: Billy Ray Cyrus
- Opening theme: "Stand Still"
- Composer: Jack Lenz
- Country of origin: United States
- Original language: English
- No. of seasons: 5
- No. of episodes: 88

Production
- Executive producers: Ken Hanes; Marilyn Stonehouse; Dave Alan Johnson
- Producers: Larry A. McLean; George Bloomfield
- Production companies: Pebblehut Productions; Paxson Entertainment

Original release
- Network: PAX TV
- Release: March 11, 2001 – November 28, 2004

Doc is an American medical drama with strong Christian undertones starring Billy Ray Cyrus as Dr. Clint "Doc" Cassidy, a Montana doctor who takes a job in a New York City medical clinic. It aired from March 11, 2001 to November 28, 2004 on Pax TV.

Although set in New York City, the series was shot in and around Toronto, Ontario, Canada. 88 episodes were produced.

== Plot summary ==
Doc follows rural doctor Clint "Doc" Cassidy who has taken a position at Westbury Clinic, a small medical center in New York City. Doc is a young Christian bachelor from the mountains of Montana, who brings his small-town values and ideology to an environment that seems to lack familiarity with them.

Supporting characters include the doctors, nurses and other staff of Westbury Clinic; a 10-year-old orphan, Raúl García; and a young couple, Nate and Beverly Jackson, who live in the same apartment building as Clint.

=== Themes ===
Each episode has three interconnecting plot lines; the predominant plot line follows Clint and his involvement in the lives of his patients. Another plot line involves Clint's relationship with his clinic coworkers, and the third involves the Jackson family. In later seasons, the Jackson family plot line or the clinic plot line is occasionally left out in preference to the predominant Clint one. The plot lines are then resolved at the end of each episode, when Clint writes an email to his guardian, Doc Johansson, back in Montana.

== Characters ==
=== Westbury Clinic ===
- Dr. Clint "Doc" Cassidy (Billy Ray Cyrus) is a kindhearted doctor from Montana who has moved to New York to work at Westbury Clinic, a medical center adjacent to the local hospital. He initially left Montana to be with his girlfriend Samantha (Claudette Mink), but he breaks up with her in the pilot because they're from different worlds. Clint has a love for God and for people, making him a popular doctor at the clinic. He often likes to insert some bits of wisdom from Montana into the clinic team's activity. It is mentioned in some episodes that Clint's parents died when he was young; he was taken in by his hometown's doctor, Doc Johansson. This adoption leads to Clint's love for medicine. He is the show's main character.
- Nancy Nichol (Andrea C. Robinson) is a young nurse who is smart, energizing, and a bit vain. She possesses good bedside manners, common sense, and a sharp wit. She isn't afraid to speak her mind. Nancy's parents divorced when she was 12, and Nancy had a touching reunion with her mother, who had cancer at the time. This reunion, and the mother eventually succumbing to her cancer, were the focuses of two episodes of the shows. She and Clint have a mutual relationship that is the focus of several episodes. Clint proposes to her in the final episode, and she says "yes".
- Dr. Derek Hebert (Derek McGrath) is a portly, witty, insightful doctor who is a very good friend of Clint's. Derek is friends with the majority of clinical team (except for Dr. Crane) and, despite his soft-spoken personality, never afraid to get involved in anything the clinic is involved in. Derek has a wife, Nellie, and a daughter, Gracie. He fears small rodents, especially rats and mice.
- Donna Dewitt (Ruth Marshall) is the clinic-hospital administrator. She combines a warm heart with a focus on the bottom line. Her occasional role as an antagonist as a result of her goal of cutting costs contrasts with her warmth, approachability and unfailing support of the rest of the staff.
- Dr. Oliver Crane (Ron Lea) is frequently the antagonist of the series. He is egotistical and selfish, and usually more concerned with his individual convenience and getting recognition from peers (especially outside the clinic) than with his patients. He is also a schemer in a sense, trying to get money and compliments, but these almost always fail. But despite his mean, outspoken personality, Oliver did soften slightly toward the end of the show's run.
- Tippy Williams, later Tippy Doss (Paula Boudreau), appears in the pilot episode, and joins Westbury later in the first season. She thinks differently than most people, and often comes across as a bit of a dimwit. She keeps the team on their toes in a silly, geeky way, but shining through Tippy's somewhat woolly mind is a heart of gold that loves, sacrifices, and longs to learn.

=== Jackson Family ===
- Nate Jackson (Richard Leacock) is an officer with the New York Police Department. Nate Jackson is initially skeptical of Clint's country ways, but the two become close friends quickly. Nate is also a building supervisor, and arranges an apartment for Clint. He affectionately gives Clint the nickname "Country".
- Raul Garcia (Tyler Posey) is an orphaned boy who is 8 years old when the series starts and around 11–12 when it ends. He and his single mother were homeless, and they slept in the basement of a New York church before Mrs. Garcia became ill and died. Despite attempts by his abusive father to get custody of Raul, he ends up getting adopted by Nate and Beverly Jackson. Raul is a normal preteen boy who gets instruction on making wise choices from his parents and from Clint, among others.
- Beverly Jackson (Tracy Shreve) is Nate's caring, conscientious wife who teaches at Raul's school. She gets pregnant in the first half of season three and gives birth to baby Mattie at the season's end.

=== Other supporting characters ===
- Justin (Demetrius Joyette) is Raul's best friend from school. They're good friends who often hang out together. Justin is a bit younger than Raul and sometimes lacks his older friend's good sense.
- Elliot (Taylor Abrahamse) is an aspiring violinist, but somewhat of a nerd. Raul and Justin are reluctant to hang out with him at first, but they soon come to learn that he is a good friend indeed.
- Steve "The Captain (later 'Major')" Doss (Kevin Jubinville) is a soldier in the U.S. Army who falls in love with Tippy and eventually marries her. He is generally good-natured and very army savvy (he speaks in the manner of a soldier on duty), but he has a tendency to be stiff and formal.
- Jelly Bean (Kenny Robinson) and Junior (Billy Otis) are street Peddlers and good friends of Clint's. When they first met they tried to rob Clint but he stopped them and helped them change their ways.
- Dr. Harley Johanson (Neil Dainard) Is a mentor and friend to Clint Cassidy. He lives in Montana and is one of Clint's best friends. Clint sees Harley as a father figure. Clint often e-mails Harley at the end of the episode. He appears in 23 episodes.

=== Notable guest stars ===
- Christian singer Steven Curtis Chapman appears in the season two episode "Fearless", as Raul's music teacher, Daniel Parson
- Cyrus's real-life daughter Miley Cyrus appears in three episodes; her on-screen acting debut in the Pilot (Part one; uncredited) as Kylie in season two, episode eight (credited as Destiny Hope); and in season four, episode six as Raul's friend; Cyrus's other daughter Noah Cyrus appears in six episodes as Gracie Hebert
- Michael Cera appears in two season two episodes as Max, a distraught preteen boy whose parents are on the edge of divorce
- Sue Thomas appears in season five, episode seven
- Christian singer Jaci Velasquez appears in the season five episode "Nip, Tuck & Die"
- Christian singer CeCe Winans appears in season three, episode seven as Rosalyn Franklin, a poor Black widow whose young son has leukemia

== Episodes ==
=== Series overview ===
Season	Episodes	Originally released	
Season	Episodes	First released	Last released
1	11	March 11, 2001	May 20, 2001
2	24	September 9, 2001	May 19, 2002
3	22	September 15, 2002	May 18, 2003
4	22	October 5, 2003	May 23, 2004
5	9	October 3, 2004	November 28, 2004

=== Season 1 (2001) ===
No. overall	No. in season	Title	Directed by	Written by	Original release date
1	1	"Pilot"	George Bloomfield	Gary R. Johnson & Dave Alan Johnson	March 11, 2001
2	2	"Pilot"	George Bloomfield	Gary R. Johnson & Dave Alan Johnson	March 11, 2001
3	3	"Family Matters"	George Bloomfield	Dave Alan Johnson	March 18, 2001
4	4	"All in a Day's Work"	E. Jane Thompson	Gary R. Johnson	March 25, 2001
5	5	"You Gotta Have Heart"	Larry McLean	Joan Considine Johnson	April 1, 2001
6	6	"The Ride"	George Bloomfield	Ed Tivnan	April 8, 2001
7	7	"Captain Supremo: Have Tights, Will Travel"	Eric Till	Gary R. Johnson	April 22, 2001
8	8	"The Art of Medicine"	Larry McLean	Ken Hanes	April 29, 2001
9	9	"You Say Goodbye, I Say Hello"	George Bloomfield	Joan Considine Johnson	May 6, 2001
10	10	"Love or Money"	Larry McLean	Gary R. Johnson	May 13, 2001
11	11	"Face in the Mirror"	Terry Ingram	John Posey	May 20, 2001

=== Season 2 (2001–02) ===
No. overall	No. in season	Title	Directed by	Written by	Original release date
12	1	"Blind Alley"	Barry Bergthorson	Dave Alan Johnson	September 9, 2001
13	2	"I've Got a Secret"	Dave Allen Johnson	Brad Markowitz	September 16, 2001
14	3	"Second Opinion"	J. Miles Dale	E.F. Wallengren	September 23, 2001
15	4	"Home is Where the Heart is"	Stacey Stewart Curtis	Ken Hanes	September 30, 2001
16	5	"Easy Money"	Stephan Fanfara	Ed Tivnan	October 7, 2001
17	6	"Garbage In, Garbage Out"	Terry Ingram	Joan Considine Johnson	October 14, 2001
18	7	"First Impressions"	Holly Dale	Kim Beyer-Johnson	October 28, 2001
19	8	"No Time Like the Present"	Don McCutcheon	Joan Considine Johnson	November 4, 2001
20	9	"Some Gave All"	Larry McLean	Gary R. Johnson & Dave Alan Johnson	November 11, 2001
21	10	"Some Gave All"	Larry McLean	Gary R. Johnson & Dave Alan Johnson	November 11, 2001
22	11	"Gypsies, Janitors and Thieves"	Stephan Fanfara	Kim Beyer-Johnson	November 18, 2001
23	12	"Tis the Season"	Larry McLean	Gary R. Johnson & Dave Alan Johnson	December 16, 2001
24	13	"All in the Family"	Barry Bergthorson	Ken Hanes	January 6, 2002
25	14	"Busy Man"	Miles Dale	Brad Markowitz	January 20, 2002
26	15	"My Boyfriend's Back"	Stephan Fanfara	Kim Beyer-Johnson	February 10, 2002
27	16	"Fearless"	Carl Goldstein	E.F. Wallengren	February 17, 2002
28	17	"Queen of Denial"	Larry McLean	Joan Considine Johnson	February 24, 2002
29	18	"Citizen Crane"	Holly Dale	Gary R. Johnson	March 3, 2002
30	19	"Love of the Game"	Larry McLean	Gary R. Johnson & E.F. Wallengren	March 24, 2002
31	20	"Karate Kid"	Don McCutcheon	Brad Markowitz	March 31, 2002
32	21	"The Commercial"	Larry McLean	Gary R. Johnson & Dave Alan Johnson	April 28, 2002
33	22	"My Secret Identity"	Stephan Fanfara	Ken Hanes	May 5, 2002
34	23	"Time Flies"	Larry McLean	Joan Considine Johnson	May 12, 2002
35	24	"Complicated"	Holly Dale	Gary R. Johnson & Dave Alan Johnson	May 19, 2002

=== Season 3 (2002–03) ===
No. overall	No. in season	Title	Directed by	Written by	Original release date
36	1	"Full Disclosure"	Larry McLean	Joan Considine Johnson & Gary R. Johnson	September 15, 2002
37	2	"On Pins and Needles"	Larry McLean	Brad Markowitz & Joan Considine Johnson	September 22, 2002
38	3	"Stroke of Luck"	Steven Fanfara	James Kahn	September 29, 2002
39	4	"See No Evil"	Ron Lea	Brad Markowitz & Kim Beyer-Johnson	October 6, 2002
40	5	"Nobody"	Miles Dale	Story by : Joan Considine Johnson & Billy Ray Cyrus; Teleplay by : Joan Considine Johnson	October 13, 2002
41	6	"Full Moon Rising"	Carl Goldstein	Mary Hanes	October 20, 2002
42	7	"The Price of a Miracle"	Holly Dale	Kim Beyer-Johnson	November 3, 2002
43	8	"Second Time Around"	Larry McLean	Robert J. Brunner	November 10, 2002
44	9	"The Producers"	Otta Hanus	Joan Considine Johnson	November 24, 2002
45	10	"Man's Best Friend"	Holly Dale	Ken Hanes	December 8, 2002
46	11	"A Clear and Present Danger"	Larry McLean	Patrick Q. Page & Gary R. Johnson	January 5, 2003
47	12	"Don't Ask, Don't Tell"	E. Jane Thompson	James Kahn	January 12, 2003
48	13	"Angels in Waiting"	Bruce Pittman	Joan Considine Johnson	February 2, 2003
49	14	"Lost and Found"	Stephan Fanfara	James Kahn	February 9, 2003
50	15	"Welcome to New York: Part 1"	Larry McLean	Gary R. Johnson & Dave Alan Johnson	February 16, 2003
51	16	"Welcome to New York: Part 2"	Larry McLean	Gary R. Johnson & Dave Alan Johnson	February 23, 2003
52	17	"Smoke Gets in Your Eyes"	David Warry-Smith	Robert J. Brunner	March 9, 2003
53	18	"Safety First"	Stephan Fanfara	Mary Hanes	April 13, 2003
54	19	"The Checkered Flag"	Ken Girotti	Robert J. Brunner	April 27, 2003
55	20	"Evaluate This"	Don McCutcheon	James Kahn	May 4, 2003
56	21	"While You Were Snoring"	Ron Lea	Joan Considine Johnson	May 11, 2003
57	22	"And Baby Makes Four"	Larry McLean	Gary R. Johnson & Dave Alan Johnson	May 18, 2003

=== Season 4 (2003–04) ===
No. overall	No. in season	Title	Directed by	Written by	Original release date
58	1	"Westbury: The Final Conflict"	Stephan Fanfara	Gary R. Johnson & Dave Alan Johnson	October 5, 2003
59	2	"The Way We Were"	Stefan Scaini	Gary R. Johnson & Kim Beyer-Johnson	October 12, 2003
60	3	"The Candidate"	Stephan Fanfara	Lance Kinsey & Joan Considine Johnson	October 19, 2003
61	4	"Pick Your Poison"	Larry McLean	Kim Beyer-Johnson & Dave Alan Johnson	November 2, 2003
62	5	"Rules of Engagement"	Larry McLean	Joan Considine Johnson & Gary R. Johnson	November 9, 2003
63	6	"Men in Tights"	Stephan Fanfara	Gary R. Johnson & Robert J. Brunner	November 16, 2003
64	7	"Donny's Millions"	Holly Dale	Gary R. Johnson & John Posey	November 23, 2003
65	8	"Swing Shift"	John Bell	Mary Hanes	December 7, 2003
66	9	"No Pain, No Gain"	Stephan Fanfara	Gary R. Johnson & Robert J. Brunner	January 11, 2004
67	10	"Who Wants to Be a Millionaire"	John Bell	Mary Hanes	January 18, 2004
68	11	"Modelrageous"	Larry McLean	Kim Beyer-Johnson & Lance Kinsey	January 25, 2004
69	12	"Arsenic & Old Spice"	Don McCutcheon	Gary R. Johnson & Stephen Beck	February 8, 2004
70	13	"Leader of the Band"	J. Miles Dale	Lance Kinsey & Robert J. Brunner	February 15, 2004
71	14	"Till Death Do Us Part"	Ron Lea	Joan Considine Johnson	February 22, 2004
72	15	"Searching for Bonnie Fisher"	Holly Dale	Gary R. Johnson & Stephen Beck	April 4, 2004
73	16	"Wedding Bell Blues"	Don McCutcheon	Kim Beyer-Johnson & Joan Considine Johnson	April 11, 2004
74	17	"Daddy Dearest"	Stephan Fanfara	Gary R. Johnson & Dave Alan Johnson	April 18, 2004
75	18	"Breaking Away"	J. Miles Dale	Ken Hanes & Brad Markowitz	April 25, 2004
76	19	"Eminent Domain"	Stephan Fanfara	Gary R. Johnson & Robert J. Brunner	May 2, 2004
77	20	"The Great Wall"	Ron Lea	Ken Hanes & Stephen Beck	May 9, 2004
78	21	"Choices of the Heart"	Larry McLean	Stephen Beck & Lance Kinsey	May 16, 2004
79	22	"He Loves Me, He Loves Me Not"	Dave Alan Johnson	Gary R. Johnson & Dave Alan Johnson	May 23, 2004

=== Season 5 (2004) ===
No. overall	No. in season	Title	Directed by	Written by	Original release date
80	1	"Get Me to Church on Time"	Stephan Fanfara	Joan Considine Johnson	October 3, 2004
81	2	"Wake-Up Call"	Larry McLean	Kim Beyer-Johnson & Gary R. Johnson	October 10, 2004
82	3	"Blindsided"	Holly Dale	Mary Hanes	October 17, 2004
83	4	"Lights, Camera, Medicine"	J. Miles Dale	Jean Considine & Joan Considine Johnson	October 24, 2004
84	5	"Nip, Tuck & Die"	Don McCutcheon	Homer Taylor	October 31, 2004
85	6	"The Family Tree"	Ken Hanes	Story by : Robert J. Brunner; Teleplay by : Dave Alan Johnson & Kim Beyer-Johnson	November 7, 2004
86	7	"The Last Ride"	Larry McLean	Jean Considine & Joan Considine Johnson	November 14, 2004
87	8	"Happy Trails"	Holly Dale	Gary R. Johnson & Dave Alan Johnson	November 21, 2004
88	9	"Til We Meet Again"	Dave Alan Johnson	Gary R. Johnson & Dave Alan Johnson	November 28, 2004

== Broadcast ==
Doc was broadcast on PAX TV. It was written by Dave Alan Johnson and Gary R. Johnson. The producers and writers were also involved with the series Sue Thomas: F.B.Eye. PAX TV, which had become Ion Television, resumed airing reruns on October 11, 2007, only to take it off the air again on November 16, 2007.

It was rebroadcast throughout 2005 on Network Ten in Australia on Saturday mornings at 4:00am.

During 2006, Doc was shown on the Canadian Showcase cable television specialty channel, Monday through Friday at 10:00am and 6:00pm. It also aired in Spanish on Mexico's National Broadcast channel at 10:30 pm Sunday through Friday.

In the United States, Doc has aired on Gospel Music Channel and on Hallmark Channel. It began airing on BYUtv weekdays at Noon and 6 PM January 16, 2012.

GetTV reran the series from July–September 22, 2017. It'll make its return to Get on April 14, 2025.

Most episodes are now available for streaming on the PureFlix streaming service.

As of 2023, Doc is available for streaming on The Roku Channel.

== Home media ==
On February 3, 2004, PAX Home Entertainment (Distributed by Ventura Distribution) released Season 1 of Doc on DVD.
