= I Will Be There for You =

Single by Jessica Andrews

from the album Heart Shaped World and The Prince of Egypt: Nashville Soundtrack
- Released: February 6, 1999
- Genre: Country
- Length: 3:20
- Label: DreamWorks
- Songwriter(s): Tom Shapiro, Josh Leo, Rick Bowles
- Producer(s): Byron Gallimore

Jessica Andrews singles chronology
"I Will Be There for You" (1999)	"You Go First (Do You Wanna Kiss)" (1999)

"I Will Be There for You" is the debut single by American country music artist Jessica Andrews. It was released in February 1999 as the first single from the album Heart Shaped World, and was featured on The Prince of Egypt: Nashville soundtrack. The song reached No. 28 on the Billboard Hot Country Singles & Tracks chart. The song was written by Tom Shapiro, Josh Leo and Rick Bowles.

== Chart performance ==
Chart (1999)	Peak position
US Hot Country Songs (Billboard)	28
US Billboard Hot 100	108
Canadian RPM Country Tracks	43
