= Little Love Letters =

Studio album by Carlene Carter
- Released: June 22, 1993
- Genre: Country
- Length: 42:31
- Label: Giant
- Producer: Howie Epstein; John Jorgenson

Carlene Carter chronology
I Fell in Love (1990)	Little Love Letters (1993)	Little Acts of Treason (1995)

Professional ratings
Review scores
Source	Rating
Allmusic	4.5/5 stars

Little Love Letters is the seventh studio album by American country music artist Carlene Carter, released on June 22, 1993. It had one major Billboard Hot Country Songs hit in the No. 3 "Every Little Thing", and two minor ones in the No. 51 "Unbreakable Heart" and No. 50 "I Love You 'Cause I Want To". The album itself rose to No. 35 on the Top Country Albums chart. "Unbreakable Heart" was later covered by Jessica Andrews on her 1999 debut Heart Shaped World, whose version reached No. 24 on the country singles charts.

== Track listing ==
CD
No.	Title	Writer(s)	Length
1.	"Little Love Letter #1"	Carlene Carter, Howie Epstein, Benmont Tench	0:57
2.	"Every Little Thing"	Carter, Al Anderson	3:12
3.	"Wastin' Time with You"	Carter, Epstein, Tench	3:38
4.	"Unbreakable Heart"	Tench	3:39
5.	"Sweet Meant to Be"	Carter, Epstein	3:15
6.	"Nowhere Train"	Carter, Anni O'Brien	3:13
7.	"Long Hard Fall"	Carter, Epstein	4:19
8.	"Little Love Letter #2"	Carter, Epstein, Tench	2:46
9.	"I Love You 'Cause I Want To"	Carter, Radney Foster	3:35
10.	"World of Miracles"	Carter, Epstein	4:24
11.	"First Kiss"	Carter, John Jorgenson	1:34
12.	"Hallelujah in My Heart"	Carter, Epstein	2:41
13.	"The Rain"	Carter, Bernie Taupin	3:47
14.	"Heart Is Right"	Carter, Epstein	3:20
Total length:			44:20

== Personnel ==
Musicians

- Eddie Bayers — drums, percussion
- Carlene Carter — acoustic guitar, electric guitar, mandolin, autoharp, percussion, vocals
- Buddy Emmons — pedal steel guitar
- Howie Epstein — acoustic guitar, electric guitar, bass guitar, banjo, percussion, background vocals
- Roy Huskey Jr. — upright bass
- John Jorgenson — acoustic guitar, electric guitar, bass guitar, mandocello, mandolin, slide guitar, clarinet, bassoon, saxophone
- Albert Lee — acoustic guitar, mandolin
- David Lindley — acoustic guitar, banjo, fiddle, mandolin
- JayDee Maness — pedal steel guitar
- Phil Parlapiano — accordion, piano
- Joe Romersa — drums, percussion
- Benmont Tench — piano, organ, "various other keyboard-related instruments"
- Willie Weeks — bass guitar

Chorus on "I Love You 'Cause I Want To": NRBQ, Jim Lauderdale, Andy Paley, Kathy Valentine, Dave Edmunds, Susan Cowsill, Phil Parlapiano, Joe Romersa

Technical

- Howie Epstein — production (all tracks)
- John Jorgenson — production ("Sweet Meant to Be" only)
- Irvin Kramer — engineering
- Dale Lavi — photography
- Chris Lord-Alge — mixing
- Joe Romersa — engineering
- Ed Seay — engineering

== Chart performance ==
Chart (1993)	Peak position
U.S. Billboard Top Country Albums	35
U.S. Billboard 200	196
Canadian RPM Country Albums	2
Canadian RPM Top Albums	45

== Certifications ==
Region	Certification	Certified units/sales
Norway (IFPI Norway)	Gold	25,000^{*}
^{*} Sales figures based on certification alone.
