= Now (Jessica Andrews album) =

Studio album by Jessica Andrews
- Released: April 15, 2003
- Genre: Country
- Length: 66:06
- Label: DreamWorks
- Producers: Billy Mann; Byron Gallimore; James Stroud

Jessica Andrews chronology
Who I Am (2001)	Now (2003)

Now is the third studio album by American country music singer Jessica Andrews. It was released on April 15, 2003. The single "There's More to Me Than You" served as its lead-off single, reaching Top 20 on the country charts. "Good Time" was also a single, peaking at number 49 on the country charts.

== Content ==
Several of the album's songs, including lead single "There's More to Me Than You", were written by Marcel, who would later become Andrews's husband. Now is also Andrews' last album, although she had multiple single releases afterward. In 2004, she recorded a duet with Bret Michaels of Poison titled "All I Ever Needed". After it, she released two singles for an unreleased fourth album for DreamWorks which would have been titled Ain't That Life, plus one single for Carolwood Records.

The album was produced by Byron Gallimore, the producer of Andrews' previous two albums, except for the track "Second Sunday", which was produced by James Stroud and Billy Mann.

== Critical reception ==
Professional ratings
Review scores
Source	Rating
AllMusic	4.5/5 stars

Stephen Thomas Erlewine of AllMusic concluded his review by saying: "But even if this does have an adult-pop bent, it's still done better than nearly any other adult-pop in 2003, and the times that Now does loosen up offer tantalizing possibilities of where Andrews could go next. And, no matter which way you cut it, as of this writing Now is one of the best mainstream pop albums of 2003, with only Kelly Clarkson's Thankful rivaling it in consistency and quality."

== Track listing ==
No.	Title	Writer(s)	Length
1.	"There's More to Me Than You"	Jessica Andrews; Marcel; James T. Slater	3:46
2.	"When Gentry Plays Guitar"	Slater	3:45
3.	"I Wish for You"	Hillary Lindsey; Aimee Mayo; Troy Verges	4:07
4.	"To Love You Once"	Jennifer Sherrill; Julie Wood	3:55
5.	"I Bring It to You"	Phil Barnhart; Kevin Paige; Bob Regan	3:35
6.	"Never Be Forgotten"	Chris Lindsey; H. Lindsey; Mayo; Verges	3:48
7.	"They Are the Roses"	Paul Jenkins; Tim Schoepf; Randy VanWarmer	4:11
8.	"Sunshine and Love"	Mayo; Verges	4:11
9.	"You're the Man (That Brings the Woman Out of Me)"	Marcel; Slater	4:12
10.	"Cowboy Guarantee"	Jim Collins; Rebecca Lynn Howard	5:01
11.	"Now"	Marv Green; C. Lindsey; Mayo	4:47
12.	"Second Sunday"	Julian Bunetta; Billy Mann	3:32
13.	"Windows on a Train"	Angelo Petraglia; H. Lindsey; Verges	3:57
14.	"God Don't Give Up on Us"	Angela Kaset; Slater	4:07
15.	"Good Time" (0:20 of silence at end)	Andrews; Bekka Bramlett; Annie Roboff	4:26
16.	"There's More To Me Than You (Ballad Version)" (hidden track)	Andrews; Marcel; Slater	4:46
Total length:			66:06

== Personnel ==
Compiled from liner notes.

=== Musicians ===
"There's More to Me Than You"

- Jessica Andrews – lead vocals
- Bekka Bramlett – tambourine
- Lisa Cochran – background vocals
- Shannon Forrest – drums
- Kenny Greenberg – electric guitar
- Aubrey Haynie – fiddle
- Michael Landau – electric guitar
- Brent Mason – electric guitar
- Gene Miller – background vocals
- Steve Nathan – Hammond B-3 organ
- Paul Franklin – steel guitar
- Glenn Worf – bass guitar

"When Gentry Plays Guitar"

- Jessica Andrews – lead vocals
- Lisa Cochran – background vocals
- Stuart Duncan – fiddle
- Shannon Forrest – drums
- Byron Gallimore – shaker
- Michael Landau – electric guitar
- Brent Mason – acoustic guitar
- Gene Miller – background vocals
- Steve Nathan – piano, keyboards
- Paul Franklin – steel guitar
- Glenn Worf – bass guitar

"I Wish for You"

- Jessica Andrews – lead vocals
- Mike Brignardello – bass guitar
- Pat Buchanan – electric guitar
- Lisa Cochran – background vocals
- Paul Franklin – steel guitar, slide guitar
- Byron Gallimore – synthesizer
- Aubrey Haynie – mandolin
- B. James Lowry – acoustic guitar
- Brent Mason – electric guitar
- Gene Miller – background vocals
- Steve Nathan – piano, keyboards
- Lonnie Wilson – drums, shaker, tambourine

"To Love You Once"

- Jessica Andrews – lead vocals
- Mike Brignardello – bass guitar
- Pat Buchanan – electric guitar
- Lisa Cochran – background vocals
- Vinnie Colaiuta – drums
- Paul Franklin – steel guitar
- Aubrey Haynie – fiddle, mandolin
- B. James Lowry – acoustic guitar
- Frank Macek – programming
- Brent Mason – electric guitar
- Gene Miller – background vocals
- Steve Nathan – keyboards, Hammond B-3 organ
- Russ Pahl – banjo

"I Bring It to You"

- Jessica Andrews – lead vocals
- Bekka Bramlett – background vocals
- Pat Buchanan – electric guitar
- Stuart Duncan – fiddle
- Paul Franklin – steel guitar
- Byron Gallimore – synthesizer strings, oboe
- Aubrey Haynie – fiddle
- Michael Landau – electric guitar
- B. James Lowry – acoustic guitar
- Brent Mason – electric guitar
- Gene Miller – background vocals
- Steve Nathan – keyboards
- Lonnie Wilson – drums
- Glenn Worf – bass guitar

"Never Forgotten"

- Jessica Andrews – lead vocals
- Bekka Bramlett – background vocals
- Shannon Forrest – drums
- Paul Franklin – steel guitar
- Byron Gallimore – synthesizer strings, acoustic guitar
- Kenny Greenberg – electric guitar
- Aubrey Haynie – fiddle
- Brent Mason – electric guitar
- Gene Miller – background vocals
- Steve Nathan – keyboards
- Glenn Worf – bass guitar
- Jonathan Yudkin – viola, cello

"They Are the Roses"

- Jessica Andrews – lead vocals
- Mike Brignardello – bass guitar, fretless bass
- Pat Buchanan – electric guitar
- Lisa Cochran – background vocals
- Paul Franklin – steel guitar
- Byron Gallimore – acoustic guitar, synthesizer cello, percussion
- Aubrey Haynie – mandolin
- Michael Landau – electric guitar
- B. James Lowry – acoustic guitar
- Frank Macek – programming
- Brent Mason – electric guitar
- Gene Miller – background vocals
- Steve Nathan – piano, keyboards
- Lonnie Wilson – drums, tambourine
- Jonathan Yudkin – cello

"Sunshine and Love"

- Jessica Andrews – lead vocals
- Pat Buchanan – electric guitar
- Mike Brignardello – bass guitar
- Mark Casstevens – banjo
- Lisa Cochran – background vocals
- Paul Franklin – steel guitar
- Aubrey Haynie – mandolin
- Michael Landau – electric guitar
- B. James Lowry – acoustic guitar
- Brent Mason – electric guitar
- Gene Miller – background vocals
- Steve Nathan – Hammond B-3 organ, Wurlitzer
- Lonnie Wilson – drums

"You're the Man"

- Jessica Andrews – lead vocals
- Bekka Bramlett – tambourine
- Shannon Forrest – drums
- Byron Gallimore – acoustic guitar, synthesizer strings
- Aubrey Haynie – fiddle
- Michael Landau – electric guitar
- Brent Mason – electric guitar
- Gene Miller – background vocals
- Steve Nathan – piano, keyboards
- Mica Roberts – background vocals
- Glenn Worf – bass guitar
- Jonathan Yudkin – viola, cello

"Cowboy Guarantee"

- Jessica Andrews – lead vocals
- Mike Brignardello – bass guitar
- Lisa Cochran – background vocals
- Vinnie Colaiuta – drums
- Aubrey Haynie – fiddle
- B. James Lowry – acoustic guitar
- Brent Mason – electric guitar
- Gene Miller – background vocals
- Steve Nathan – piano, keyboards
- Russ Pahl – steel guitar

"Now"

- Jessica Andrews – lead vocals
- Mike Brignardello – bass guitar
- Pat Buchanan – electric guitar
- Lisa Cochran – background vocals
- Vinnie Colaiuta – drums
- Frank Macek – programming
- Byron Gallimore – electric guitar, synthesizer strings, percussion
- Aubrey Haynie – fiddle, mandolin
- Michael Landau – electric guitar
- B. James Lowry – acoustic guitar
- Brent Mason – electric guitar
- Gene Miller – background vocals
- Steve Nathan – piano, keyboards
- Russ Pahl – steel guitar

"Second Sunday"

- Jessica Andrews – lead vocals, background vocals
- Julian Bunetta – programming
- Shannon Forrest – drums
- Paul Franklin – steel guitar
- Tony Harrell – piano, keyboards
- Aubrey Haynie – fiddle, mandolin
- Billy Mann – acoustic guitar
- Brent Mason – electric guitar
- Mica Roberts – background vocals
- Glenn Worf – bass guitar

"Windows on a Train"

- Jessica Andrews – lead vocals
- Shannon Forrest – drums
- Byron Gallimore – acoustic guitar
- Kenny Greenberg – electric guitar
- Aubrey Haynie – fiddle
- Michael Landau – electric guitar
- Brent Mason – electric guitar
- Steve Nathan – piano, keyboards
- Glenn Worf – bass guitar
- Jonathan Yudkin – viola, cello

"God Don't Give Up on Us"

- Jessica Andrews – lead vocals
- Mike Brignardello – bass guitar
- Byron Gallimore – percussion, horns
- Kenny Greenberg – acoustic guitar, electric guitar
- Steve Nathan – piano, keyboards, synthesizer strings
- Lonnie Wilson – drums

"Good Time"

- Jessica Andrews – lead vocals
- Bekka Bramlett – background vocals, tambourine
- Shannon Forrest – drums
- Paul Franklin – steel guitar, Dobro
- Byron Gallimore – acoustic guitar
- Aubrey Haynie – fiddle
- Brent Mason – electric guitar
- Gene Miller – background vocals
- Steve Nathan – piano, keyboards, Hammond B-3 organ
- John Willis – banjo
- Glenn Worf – bass guitar

=== Technical ===
- Byron Gallimore – production (all tracks except "Second Sunday"); mixing (tracks 1, 2, 5, 6, 7, 9, 11, 13, 14, 15), vocal overdubs (tracks 3, 4, and 8)
- Julian King – recording
- Bob Ludwig – mastering
- Billy Mann – production ("Second Sunday" only)
- Mike Shipley – mixing (tracks 3, 4, 8, 10)
- James Stroud – production ("Second Sunday" only)
- Andy Zulla – mixing (track 12)

== Chart performance ==
=== Weekly charts ===
Chart (2003)	Peak position
US Billboard 200	34
US Top Country Albums (Billboard)	4

=== Year-end charts ===
Chart (2003)	Position
US Top Country Albums (Billboard)	50

=== Singles ===
Year	Single	Peak positions	
Year	Single	US Country	US Bubbling
2002	"There's More to Me Than You"	17	8
2003	"Good Time"	49	—
