= Heart Shaped World =

Heart Shaped World may refer to:

- Heart Shaped World (Chris Isaak album), 1989
- Heart Shaped World (Jessica Andrews album), 1999
