= You Go First (Do You Wanna Kiss) =

Single by Jessica Andrews

from the album Heart Shaped World
- Released: July 10, 1999
- Genre: Country
- Length: 3:16
- Label: DreamWorks
- Songwriter(s): Kerry Chater, Lynn Gillespie Chater, Cyril Rawson
- Producer(s): Byron Gallimore

Jessica Andrews singles chronology
"I Will Be There for You" (1999)	"You Go First (Do You Wanna Kiss)" (1999)	"Unbreakable Heart" (2000)

"You Go First (Do You Wanna Kiss)" is a song recorded by American country music artist Jessica Andrews. It was released in July 1999 as the second single from the album Heart Shaped World. The song reached #25 on the Billboard Hot Country Singles & Tracks chart. The song was written by Kerry Chater, Lynn Gillespie Chater and Cyril Rawson.

== Chart performance ==
Chart (1999)	Peak position
US Hot Country Songs (Billboard)	25
US Bubbling Under Hot 100 Singles (Billboard)	17
Canadian RPM Country Tracks	43
