= Every Little Thing (Carlene Carter song) =

Single by Carlene Carter

from the album Little Love Letters
- B-side: "Long Hard Fall"
- Released: May 20, 1993
- Genre: Country, country rock, rock and roll
- Length: 3:12
- Label: Giant
- Songwriters: Carlene Carter; Al Anderson
- Producer: Howie Epstein

Carlene Carter singles chronology
"One Love" (1991)	"Every Little Thing" (1993)	"Unbreakable Heart" (1993)

"Every Little Thing" is a song co-written and recorded by American country music artist Carlene Carter. It released in May 1993 as the first single from her album Little Love Letters. The song reached number 3 on the Billboard Hot Country Singles & Tracks chart in August 1993. It was written by Carter and Al Anderson.

"Every Little Thing" is featured in the Williams Pinball machine Red & Ted's Road Show.

== Chart performance ==
Chart (1993)	Peak position
Canada Country Singles (RPM)	3
US Hot Country Songs (Billboard)	3

=== Year-end charts ===
Chart (1993)	Position
Canada Country Tracks (RPM)	28
US Country Songs (Billboard)	26
