= There's More to Me Than You =

Single by Jessica Andrews

from the album Now
- B-side: "I Wish for You"
- Released: December 2, 2002
- Genre: Country
- Length: 3:46 (album version); 4:46 (ballad version)
- Label: DreamWorks Nashville
- Songwriters: Jessica Andrews, Marcel, James T. Slater
- Producer: Byron Gallimore

Jessica Andrews singles chronology
"Karma" (2002)	"There's More to Me Than You" (2002)	"Good Time" (2003)

"There's More to Me Than You" is a song co-written and recorded by American country music artist Jessica Andrews. It was released in December 2002 as the first single from the album Now. The song reached number 17 on the Billboard Hot Country Singles & Tracks chart. Andrews wrote the song with James T. Slater and Marcel, who would later become her husband.

== Content ==
The song is about a woman experiencing a breakup and telling her partner that "there's more to me than you." The lyrics contain a reference to Toby Keith's 1999 single "How Do You Like Me Now?!"

== Music video ==
The music video was directed by Adolfo Doring and premiered in early 2003. The video was filmed in Joshua Tree National Park in California.

== Chart performance ==
"There's More to Me Than You" debuted at number 55 on the U.S. Billboard Hot Country Singles & Tracks for the week of December 7, 2002.

Chart (2002–2003)	Peak position
US Hot Country Songs (Billboard)	17
US Bubbling Under Hot 100 (Billboard)	8

=== Year-end charts ===
Chart (2003)	Position
US Country Songs (Billboard)	59
