= Who I Am (Jessica Andrews song) =

Single by Jessica Andrews

from the album Who I Am
- B-side: "Helplessly, Hopelessly"
- Released: October 30, 2000
- Recorded: 2000
- Genre: Country
- Length: 4:15
- Label: DreamWorks Nashville
- Songwriters: Brett James; Troy Verges
- Producer: Byron Gallimore

Jessica Andrews singles chronology
"I Do Now" (2000)	"Who I Am" (2000)	"Helplessly, Hopelessly" (2001)

"Who I Am" is a song by American country music artist Jessica Andrews that was released on October 30, 2000, as the lead single to her second studio album of the same name (2001). It was written by Brett James and Troy Verges.

== Background ==
In a 2001 interview, Andrews explained that she recorded the song (which was written by Brett James and Troy Verges) because she felt that its lyrics were especially fitting to her own life: "Everything is so true in that song, except that my grandmother's name is not Rosemary. It's about believing in yourself and being supported by those around you. No matter how many mistakes you make, your friends and family will be there for you." Andrews performed the track at the 2001 CMA Awards.

== Content ==
The song is a mid tempo country song in which the narrator tells of how, no matter what her future, she will be satisfied with her life, because she is confident about herself, and she knows that her peers will still support her.

== Use in media ==
Sections of this song are featured in the opening theme of TV police drama Sue Thomas: F.B.Eye. It also appeared on an episode of Lizzie McGuire.

== Critical reception ==
Rick Cohoon of Allmusic described the song favorably, saying that it "seems to echo Andrews’ self-confidence in moving forward to face the challenges of the music industry".

== Music video ==
The song's video, directed by filmmaker Jon Ragel, focuses mainly on Andrews singing in a flower field, on a swing, and beside a brick wall. Actual home footage of her childhood is interspersed throughout the video, and it ends with her waking up in bed and smiling, having dreamt the whole thing.

== Cover versions ==
Country music artist Danielle Bradbery featured a cover of "Who I Am" on the deluxe version of her self-titled debut album, having sung this song as a tribute to her family during the semi-finals of Season 4 of The Voice, which she eventually won.

== Charts ==
The song had sold 361,000 copies in the US as of June 2013.

=== Weekly charts ===
Weekly chart performance for "Who I Am"
Chart (2000–2001)	Peak position
US Billboard Hot 100	28
US Hot Country Songs (Billboard)	1
US Adult Contemporary (Billboard)	24
US Latin Pop Airplay (Billboard)	20

=== Year-end charts ===
2001 year-end chart performance for "Who I Am"
Chart (2001)	Position
Canada Radio (Nielsen BDS)	88
US Country Songs (Billboard)	8

== Release history ==
Release dates and format(s) for "Who I Am"
Region	Date	Format(s)	Label(s)	Ref.
United States	October 30, 2000	Country radio	DreamWorks Nashville	
United States	July 9, 2001	Contemporary hit radio	DreamWorks Nashville	
United States	July 16, 2001	Adult contemporary radio	DreamWorks Nashville	
