= Heart Shaped World (Jessica Andrews album) =

Studio album by Jessica Andrews
- Released: March 23, 1999
- Genre: Country
- Length: 43:06
- Label: DreamWorks
- Producer: Byron Gallimore

Jessica Andrews chronology
Heart Shaped World (1999)	Who I Am (2001)

Singles from Heart Shaped World
- 1. "I Will Be There for You" Released: January 25, 1999; 2. "You Go First (Do You Wanna Kiss)" Released: June 28, 1999; 3. "Unbreakable Heart" Released: December 6, 1999; 4. "I Do Now" Released: June 5, 2000

Heart Shaped World is the debut studio album of American country music singer Jessica Andrews. It was released on March 23, 1999 by DreamWorks Records, under their DreamWorks Nashville sublabel. It produced four singles on the Hot Country Songs charts: "I Will Be There for You", "You Go First (Do You Wanna Kiss)", "Unbreakable Heart", and "I Do Now". "I Will Be There for You" was also included on the Nashville soundtrack to the 1998 DreamWorks Animation film The Prince of Egypt. "Unbreakable Heart" was originally recorded by Carlene Carter on her 1993 album Little Love Letters.

== Critical reception ==
Professional ratings
Review scores
Source	Rating
AllMusic	3.5/5 stars

Alex Henderson of AllMusic wrote that "[for] as much sweetness as she projects, Andrews isn't bubblegum—when she digs into 'You Go First', 'I've Been Waiting for You', and 'James Dean in Tennessee', you know that the singer isn't without an edge... And on Billy Burnette's ominous, bluesy 'Hungry Love'—the tale of a girl who has to grow up much too fast—it's clear that Andrews is capable of depth."

Eli Messinger reviews the album for Country Standard Time and says, "Andrews has skipped a few squares, singing at an emotional level at odds with her actual age. And though this formula has worked before (notably for LeAnn Rimes), one hopes her life experience will catch up with her talent."

== Track listing ==
No.	Title	Writer(s)	Length
1.	"James Dean in Tennessee"	Billy Mann	3:31
2.	"You Go First (Do You Wanna Kiss)"	Kerry Chater; Lynn Gillespie Chater; Cyril Rawson	3:16
3.	"The Riverside"	Cathy Majeski; John Scott Sherrill	5:17
4.	"Whatever"	Lisa Drew; Shaye Smith	3:20
5.	"Unbreakable Heart"	Benmont Tench	4:09
6.	"Hungry Love"	Billy Burnette; Tony Colton	3:32
7.	"Heart Shaped World"	Gayla Borders; Jeff Borders; W.L. Burnette; Brian Tabor	3:15
8.	"I'll Take Your Heart"	Robert John "Mutt" Lange	3:35
9.	"I Do Now"	Franne Golde; Tom Snow	3:21
10.	"I've Been Waiting for You"	Sunny Russ; Jason Sellers; Stephony Smith	3:09
11.	"Ruby Shoes"	Kris Tyler; Sharon Vaughn	3:21
12.	"I Will Be There for You"	Rick Bowles; Josh Leo; Tom Shapiro	3:20
Total length:			43:06

== Personnel ==
- Jessica Andrews- lead vocals, background vocals
- Larry Beaird- acoustic guitar
- Mike Brignardello- bass guitar
- Larry Byrom- acoustic guitar
- Mark Casstevens- banjo
- Dan Dugmore- steel guitar
- Stuart Duncan- fiddle, mandolin
- Paul Franklin- steel guitar
- Byron Gallimore- bass guitar, acoustic guitar, electric guitar, keyboards, piano
- Aubrey Haynie- fiddle, mandolin
- Michael Landau- electric guitar
- B. James Lowry- electric guitar
- Brent Mason- electric guitar
- Terry McMillan- harmonica, percussion
- Michael Mellett- background vocals
- The Nashville String Machine- strings
- Steve Nathan- keyboards, piano
- Kim Parent- background vocals
- Chris Rodriguez- background vocals
- Russell Terrell- background vocals
- Biff Watson- acoustic guitar
- Bergen White- string arrangements
- Lonnie Wilson- drums
- Glenn Worf- bass guitar

== Chart performance ==
=== Album ===
Chart (1999)	Peak position
US Top Country Albums (Billboard)	24
US Heatseekers Albums (Billboard)	15

=== Singles ===
Year	Single	Peak chart positions		
Year	Single	US Country	US Bubbling	CAN Country
1999	"I Will Be There for You"	28	8	43
1999	"You Go First (Do You Wanna Kiss)"	25	17	43
2000	"Unbreakable Heart"	24	10	43
2000	"I Do Now"	53	—	*
