= Unbreakable Heart =

Single by Carlene Carter

from the album Little Love Letters
- B-side: "Wastin' Time with You"
- Released: October 9, 1993
- Genre: Country
- Length: 3:39
- Label: Giant
- Songwriter(s): Benmont Tench
- Producer(s): Howie Epstein

Carlene Carter singles chronology
"Every Little Thing" (1993)	"Unbreakable Heart" (1993)	"I Love You 'Cause I Want To" (1994)

"Unbreakable Heart"

Single by Jessica Andrews

from the album Heart Shaped World
- Released: March 21, 2000
- Genre: Country
- Length: 4:09
- Label: DreamWorks
- Songwriter(s): Benmont Tench
- Producer(s): Byron Gallimore

Jessica Andrews singles chronology
"You Go First (Do You Wanna Kiss)" (1999)	"Unbreakable Heart" (2000)	"I Do Now" (2000)

"Unbreakable Heart" is a song written by Benmont Tench and first recorded by American country music artist Carlene Carter. It was released in October 1993 as the second single from her album Little Love Letters, produced by Howie Epstein, Tench's bandmate in Tom Petty and the Heartbreakers. The song reached #51 on the Billboard Hot Country Singles & Tracks chart. The song was covered by American country music artist Jessica Andrews, and was released in March 2000 as the third single from the album Heart Shaped World. This version reached #24 on the Billboard Hot Country Singles & Tracks chart.

== Chart performance (Carlene Carter version) ==
Chart (1993)	Peak position
US Hot Country Songs (Billboard)	51
Canadian RPM Country Tracks	34

== Chart performance (Jessica Andrews version) ==
Chart (2000)	Peak position
US Hot Country Songs (Billboard)	24
US Bubbling Under Hot 100 Singles (Billboard)	10
Canadian RPM Country Tracks	43
