= List of Sue Thomas: F.B.Eye episodes =

The following is a list of episodes of the PAX-TV drama Sue Thomas: F.B.Eye, which premiered on October 13, 2002, and cancelled on May 22, 2005.

A total of 57 episodes of the series have aired, including parts 1 and 2 of the pilot.

== Series overview ==
Season	Episodes	Originally released	
Season	Episodes	First released	Last released
1	19	October 13, 2002	May 18, 2003
2	19	October 5, 2003	May 23, 2004
3	19	October 3, 2004	May 22, 2005

== Episodes ==
=== Season 1 (2002–03) ===
No. overall	No. in season	Title	Directed by	Written by	Original release date
1	1	"Pilot (Part 1)"	Larry A. McLean	Dave Alan Johnson, Gary R. Johnson	October 13, 2002
Sue Thomas is a Deaf woman with the ability to read lips. She moves to Washington, D.C. to begin her new job as an FBI agent and discovers that her new job is not all it's cracked up to be. Due to an out-of-date directory, she accidentally vents her disappointment to Special Agent Jack Hudson, who is impressed by her honesty and tests her skills by having her read a colleagues lips, discovering he is planning a weekend away with a woman. Jack asks Sue to join his Unit of Special Investigators, where she discovers her new friend Lucy is the girlfriend of Myles, the man Sue saw earlier planning a trip with a different woman.
2	2	"Pilot (Part 2)"	Larry A. McLean	Dave Alan Johnson, Gary R. Johnson	October 13, 2002
Sue is put in the uncomfortable position as knowing that her new colleague Myles is having an affair behind his girlfriend Lucy's back, whilst also trying to prove that, now that Jack has given her the chance of a lifetime, she has what it takes to follow through.
3	3	"Bombs Away"	J. Miles Dale, Larry A. McLean	Dave Alan Johnson, Gary A. Johnson	October 20, 2002
When Sue becomes an official member of the team, Jack trains her and he's got a perfect case for her: a bomb threat against a former FBI agent.
4	4	"Assassins"	Stephan Fanfara	Mark Lisson	October 27, 2002
While trying to protect an Afghan leader, the team loses their primary assassin. But when they think that all hope is lost, another possible assassin is tracked down and put under surveillance, giving the team interesting results.
5	5	"A Snitch in Time"	David Warry-Smith	Kim Breyer-Johnson, Dave Alan Johnson	November 3, 2002
After Jack and Bobby arrest a drug dealer they, along with Sue, interrogate him in order to capture other drug dealers in the trade. Meanwhile, the rest of the team focus on the brand new offices on the fifth floor.
6	6	"The Signing"	Bruce Pittman	Dave Alan Johnson, Brad Markowitz	November 10, 2002
Having been handed a case about an infamous convict, the team tries to get closer to the convict through his partner, who is deaf.
7	7	"A Blast from the Past"	Stephan Fanfara	Lance Kinsey	November 24, 2002
Dimitrius gets a less than pleasant surprise when a man he threw in prison twelve years ago begins to spy on him and his family. Meanwhile, Lucy battles with a doctor who claims that her car dented the passenger door on his car.
8	8	"Silent Night"	Alan Goluboff	Kim Breyer-Johnson, Joan Considine Johnson	December 15, 2002
In the middle of the Christmas season, a mysterious Santa was robbing banks with a few helpers. Bobby tries to present a good image to the press but a determined reporter is eager to attack the FBI. Sue's relationship with her mother comes to a head when her parents stay over.
9	9	"Greed"	David Warry-Smith	Brad Markowitz	January 12, 2003
A friend of Lucy's makes the team suspicious when a rumour begins to circulate that the large company that she works for may be going under. After work, the team heads to the football field, hoping to retain control of the infamous trophy.
10	10	"Diplomatic Immunity"	Holly Dale	Nickolas Barris	January 19, 2003
After Bobby tries to protect a woman from an attacker, he is suspended from the FBI when the man turns out to be a Sudanese diplomat with immunity from US law enforcements. When the man is connected to a slave trade market, Darcy gets into some trouble of her own after she tells the public about the story.
11	11	"Dirty Bomb"	Eleanor Lindo	Mark Lisson	February 2, 2003
The team races against time to find a crate of strontium which they believe will be used to make a dirty bomb. Lucy fears for her family when they are coming to her sister's wedding.
12	12	"The Heist"	Bruce Pittman	Kim Breyer-Johnson, Joan Considine Johnson	February 9, 2003
Drivers of two security trucks that were carrying money, go missing while on duty. While the team searches for them, Sue helps Lucy improve her sign language when the two go to a deaf club, where talking is not allowed.
13	13	"The Leak"	John Bell	Brad Markowitz	February 16, 2003
When an unsuccessful raid by the FBI coincides with the disappearance of one of Sue's informants, the team believe that terrorists were the source of the leak. Eventually, it turns out that an aide to the Senator from Jack's hometown of Wisconsin was behind it.
14	14	"Missing"	Bruce Pittman	Kim Breyer-Johnson, Joan Considine Johnson	March 16, 2003
The team's favourite waitress seems to be involved in software piracy and has been using Tara's business card in the process. Myles is then being considered a candidate for the new face of the FBI.
15	15	"Prodigal Father"	Larry A. McLean	Kim Breyer-Johnson, Joan Considine Johnson	April 6, 2003
Trying to catch a long wanted criminal, the team uses a jail bound con man to capture him. The informant turns out to be Bobby's father, which Bobby unhappy.
16	16	"He Said She Said"	Holly Dale	Gary R. Johnson, Brad Markowitz	April 27, 2003
Sue and Myles are assigned to a special task force to take down a South American drug group. Sue is then blamed for the death of an FBI agent, and the team tries to remove the blame, with some help from Troy and Charlie.
17	17	"The Hunter"	Eleanor Lindo	Dave Alan Johnson, Lance Kinsey	May 4, 2003
When it seems as if an innocent man is convicted of being a serial killer many years ago, the FBI starts a new search for evidence of a recent killing that resembles that of the old murderer. Jack stands trial for killing and traumatising chickens.
18	18	"The Fugitive"	John Bell	Kim Breyer-Johnson, Joan Considine Johnson	May 11, 2003
While Sue reluctantly attends a wedding of an old friend of hers, the team is on a lookout for a prisoner soon to be released, who may be going after his wife that helped put him away.
19	19	"Billy the Kid"	Holly Dale	Dave Alan Johnson, Lance Kinsey	May 18, 2003
Lucy's mum announces that she is engaged, while the team looks into the attempted murder of a judge, who is a friend of Jack's, by a young man, Billy, who also a friend of Jack's.: The episode includes a brief guest appearance by the real Sue Thomas, as "Deanne Bray", a deaf actress.

=== Season 2 (2003–04) ===
No. overall	No. in season	Title	Directed by	Written by	Original release date
20	1	"Girl Who Signed Wolf"	David Warry-Smith	Joan Considine Johnson, Nickolas Barris	October 5, 2003
Disbelief runs through the F.B.I. office when a young deaf girl claims to have witnessed a kidnapping and an author comes to interview Myles.
21	2	"The Sniper"	Holly Dale	Dave Alan Johnson, Gary R. Johnson, Steven Dean Moore	October 12, 2003
Three random people are all shot by the same man. With so little evidence to go on, the team is stretched to the limit forcing Jack to take drastic actions in order to catch the sniper, actions that could put his life in danger.
22	3	"Homeland Security"	Larry A. McLean	Nickolas Barris, David Alan Johnson, Gary R. Johnson, Joan Considine Johnson	November 2, 2003
As Myles cracks down on a case of art forgery, the rest of the team investigates a bomb threat. Sue becomes worried when Charlie begins to forget certain things.
23	4	"Cold Case"	David Warry-Smith	Gary R. Johnson, Lance Kinsey	November 9, 2003
Sue and Lucy dig up an old case concerning a young bank teller who was shot. However, with so little evidence, the girls find it hard to make any progress. In the meantime, the boys film their on-line videos for an upcoming bachelor auction.
24	5	"The Newlywed Game (Part I)"	Larry A. McLean	Dave Alan Johnson, Gary R. Johnson	November 16, 2003
When the F.B.I notice some unusual phone calls between possible terrorists and D.C citizens, they decide to do some surveillance. In order to remain inconspicuous, Sue and Jack pose as a newly married couple and move into the house next door to the suspects.
25	6	"Breaking Up Is Hard to Do (Part II)"	J. Miles Dale	Gary R. Johnson	November 23, 2003
The team continues their investigation believing that the suspects intend to spread the bubonic plague. With Betty as their only hope of catching the criminals, the team races against time to stop them in their tracks.
26	7	"Bad Hair Day"	Bruce Pittman	Nickolas Barris, Joan Considine Johnson	January 11, 2004
When Tara shoots a robber in a hair salon, her security is tested by family of the deceased. Sue and Lucy take care of an owner-less dog they found at the park.
27	8	"Political Agenda"	Alan Goluboff	Ken Hanes, Brad Markowitz	January 18, 2004
When the team starts an investigation concerning the homicide of a young woman, they get a confession quickly. But it soon becomes clear that their confessor is not the criminal.
28	9	"The Gambler"	Brad Markowitz	Dave Alan Johnson	February 8, 2004
In order to catch a long wanted criminal, Bobby gets back into his old gambling habits, with dangerous consequences. Levi starts acting up and eventually goes missing.
29	10	"Into Thin Air"	David Warry-Smith	Kim Beyer-Johnson, Ken Hanes, Brad Markowitz	February 15, 2004
Sue is assigned a missing persons case when a 19-year-old deaf college student disappears. Myles is determined to secure an overseas assignment, believing it has connections with the CIA.
30	11	"To Grandmother's House We Go"	Holly Dale	Kim Beyer-Johnson, Joan Considine Johnson	February 22, 2004
While Lucy's grandmother is on the verge of becoming homeless due to a contract fraud, a bank robbery has the FBI team's attention divided.
31	12	"The Lawyer"	Larry A. McLean	Nickolas Barris, Dave Alan Johnson	April 4, 2004
Jack finds himself face to face with a civil rights lawyer after being accused of denying a potential terrorist their rights.
32	13	"The Holocaust Survivor"	Dave Alan Johnson	Joan Considine Johnson	April 11, 2004
When an acquaintance of Sue's sees who she thinks was a concentration camp guard in World War II, Sue begins to investigate, looking for the man with little evidence to go on. Meanwhile, Myles, Bobby, and Dimitrius battle against Randy over travel expenses.
33	14	"The Mentor"	Larry A. McLean	Nickolas Barris, Dave Alan Johnson	April 18, 2004
Sue meets Jack and Bobby's FBI Mentor when he brings the team in on a case to sting a North Korean terror group - but Tara discovers that things are not as they seem. Meanwhile, Lucy reconnects with her old high school love - with surprising results.
34	15	"Rocket Man"	Holly Dale	Kim Beyer-Johnson, Brad Markowitz	April 25, 2004
Sue and Dimitrius put an operative in the field to take down an illegal arms sale - but when the encounter gives them a chance to land an even bigger fish, Dimitrius goes undercover as the bait. Meanwhile, Dimitrius's wife, Donna, has some unexpected news of her own.
35	16	"Elvis Is in the Building"	Bruce Pittman	Gary R. Johnson, Joan Considine Johnson, James Keenly	May 2, 2004
Sue and the team must infiltrate a Chinese drug-smuggling ring, requiring Bobby to go undercover at the gang leader's nightclub - as an Elvis impersonator. And Sue learns that her friend, Troy, has an estranged brother - and that the estranged brother has a secret.
36	17	"Hit and Run"	David Warry-Smith	Kim Beyer-Johnson, Joan Considine Johnson	May 9, 2004
When the members of a think tank are found shot dead, Sue and the team track down the sole survivor - but is he a possible future victim or the murderer? By accident, Sue ends up in the fleeing man's car. And Sue teaches Levi some new tricks - or maybe he's teaching her.
37	18	"Concrete Evidence"	J. Miles Dale	Steven Dean Moore	May 16, 2004
Investigating a 5-year old murder, the team automatically links the killing to a group of drug dealers, but further investigating draws them towards another killing that occurred just months before the first. Meanwhile, Myles attempts to improve his neighbourly relations.
38	19	"The Kiss"	Larry A. McLean	Ken Hanes	May 23, 2004
In order to solve a case involving two men shot with the same gun, Sue and Jack go undercover to the law firm that the two men both worked at. With Myles's sister also working at the law firm, the agents get deeper and deeper into the facts of the case.

=== Season 3 (2004–05) ===
No. overall	No. in season	Title	Directed by	Written by	Original release date
39	1	"Adventures in Babysitting"	Holly Dale	Dave Alan Johnson, Gary R. Johnson	October 3, 2004
When the F.B.I's special assistant Howie claims to have nearly escaped being shot, Jack and the team are skeptical as to the legitimacy of Howie's story. However Howie's tale becomes more and more plausible as other killings arise, all linked to Howie's incident.
40	2	"The Body Shop"	Bruce Pittman	Stephen Beck, Brad Markowitz	October 10, 2004
Seven Eastern-European terrorists in the D.C area are under suspicion from the F.B.I team who have linked them to an underground organ dealing business. In the meantime, Sue and Lucy struggle to live with Anita, their unannounced, and very picky, house guest.
41	3	"Skin Deep"	Stephan Fanfara	Dave Alan Johnson, Gary R. Johnson, Joan Considine Johnson, Kathleen Taylor	October 17, 2004
When a radical environmentalist group blows up an SUV, the F.B.I looks into the case with the help of a victim from one of the environmentalist group's earlier fires. Meanwhile, with his cholesterol off the charts, Myles decides to make some changes to his dietary lifestyle.
42	4	"The New Mafia"	Larry A. McLean	Brian Bird, Bob Hamer	October 31, 2004
A special undercover agent from San Diego comes to D.C to assist in an operation involving street drug dealers. But Jack quickly becomes annoyed with the new agent when he starts to show interest in Sue.
43	5	"The Actor (Part 1)"	J. Miles Dale	Gary R. Johnson, Joan Considine Johnson	November 7, 2004
A famous actor visits the F.B.I to observe as the team tracks down a gang involved in selling fire arms. Later when the team gets word of a possible terrorist threat, the movie star begins to show interest in Tara.
44	6	"Planes, Trains and Automobiles (Part 2)"	David Warry-Smith	Nickolas Barris, Dave Alan Johnson, Joan Considine Johnson	November 14, 2004
The team continues their investigation concerning a missing plane which seems to be connected to their terrorist threat. Meanwhile, an unexpected boyfriend of Tara's shows up.
45	7	"Simon Says"	Larry A. McLean	Kim Beyer-Johnson, Brad Markowitz	November 21, 2004
When several 30-year-old women are murdered in a similar fashion, the F.B.I team suspects a serial killer. At first their chances of catching the killer seem bleak, but then the murderer makes contact with Sue and leads her through his own game of Simon Says which will lead them all to him.
46	8	"Did She or Didn't She?"	David Warry-Smith	Dave Alan Johnson, Gary R. Johnson	November 28, 2004
When the husband of Sue's friend, Carol, is killed in a boating accident, the team begins to look deeper into the couple's marital history. Meanwhile, Bobby and Myles escort two witnesses on a long, and troublesome, road trip to Arizona.
47	9	"Fraternity"	Holly Dale	Nickolas Barris, Joan Considine Johnson	January 30, 2005
Sue and the rest of the team investigate the death of a prominent Senator's son during a college fraternity hazing. But what appears to be an open and shut case of alcohol poisoning takes a surprising turn. Meanwhile, Sue gets a lesson in instant adolescent parenting when Amanda, Sue's twelve-year-old Deaf friend, spends the week.
48	10	"Secret Agent Man (Part 1)"	Dave Alan Johnson	Dave Alan Johnson, Gary R. Johnson	February 13, 2005
While Myles battles with a neighbour over a flagpole, a video recording submitted to the F.B.I is investigated for possible leads.
49	11	"Spy Games (Part 2)"	Dave Alan Johnson	Stephen Beck, Joan Considine Johnson	February 20, 2005
Continuing their investigation with a newly missing informant, the F.B.I must try to find amnesia-stricken Jonathan as his memory slowly returns, giving him more and more clues that may put an end to the case.
50	12	"Boy Meets World"	Holly Dale	Nickolas Barris, Brad Markowitz	March 6, 2005
The F.B.I team investigates the group behind 2 bombings, one at a restaurant, the other a suicide bomb at a metro station. Meanwhile, Miles embarks on a new vitamin health regime.
51	13	"False Profit"	Larry A. McLean	Kim Beyer-Johnson, Joan Considine Johnson	March 13, 2005
When a young woman is kidnapped in broad daylight, Sue and the rest of the team are introduced to Mind Profit, a cult that believes in bringing a person to their true self and has been the link to some mysterious disappearances.
52	14	"Who Wants to Be a Millionaire"	Stephan Fanfara	Stephen Beck, Gary R. Johnson	April 3, 2005
After a small plane crashes in a Virginia field, the team discovers the burned plane contained one million dollars and a small drug stash. In the meantime, Randy enlists Sue's help in preparation for his date with a deaf woman.
53	15	"The Bounty Hunter"	Larry A. McLean	Ken Hanes, Lance Kinsey	April 17, 2005
After a sophisticated millionaire attempts to rob a bank and is shot down by the police, the F.B.I team investigates further into the businessman's life and find designer drugs at the heart of it. Meanwhile, Sue and Lucy have Levi photographed for dog food advertisements.
54	16	"Troy Story"	Holly Dale	Joan Considine Johnson	May 1, 2005
Sue and the rest of the team are shocked when Sue's long time informant Troy is arrested for robbing a convenience store. Darcy informs Bobby of a new job offer that she has received in California that will force her to move, if she takes it and Myles's recent jaw injury is giving the rest of the team a break while Myles remains silent for five days.
55	17	"Mind Games"	Larry A. McLean	Nickolas Barris, Kim Beyer-Johnson	May 8, 2005
While battling against their very young, inexperienced new supervisor, Wayne Morris, the team investigates the alleged murder of a senator. However they're not sure whether or not to believe their witness, a schizophrenic who often sees things that are not real.
56	18	"Bad Girls"	Ken Hanes	Gary R. Johnson	May 15, 2005
Lucy and Sue track down a former love of Lucy's grandmother and the team investigates a variety of bank heists connected to three teenage girls in a private high school.
57	19	"Endings and Beginnings"	Dave Alan Johnson	Dave Alan Johnson	May 22, 2005
Sue has mixed feelings when she is offered a promotion in New York and must decide whether to leave behind her friends and home town or whether to give up a great job opportunity. While she decides, the team hunts down a hacker who has taken control of Jack's credit card. The episode includes a brief guest appearance by the real Sue Thomas, in the final couple of minutes.
