= Sue Thomas: F.B.Eye =

Crime drama television series (2002–2005)

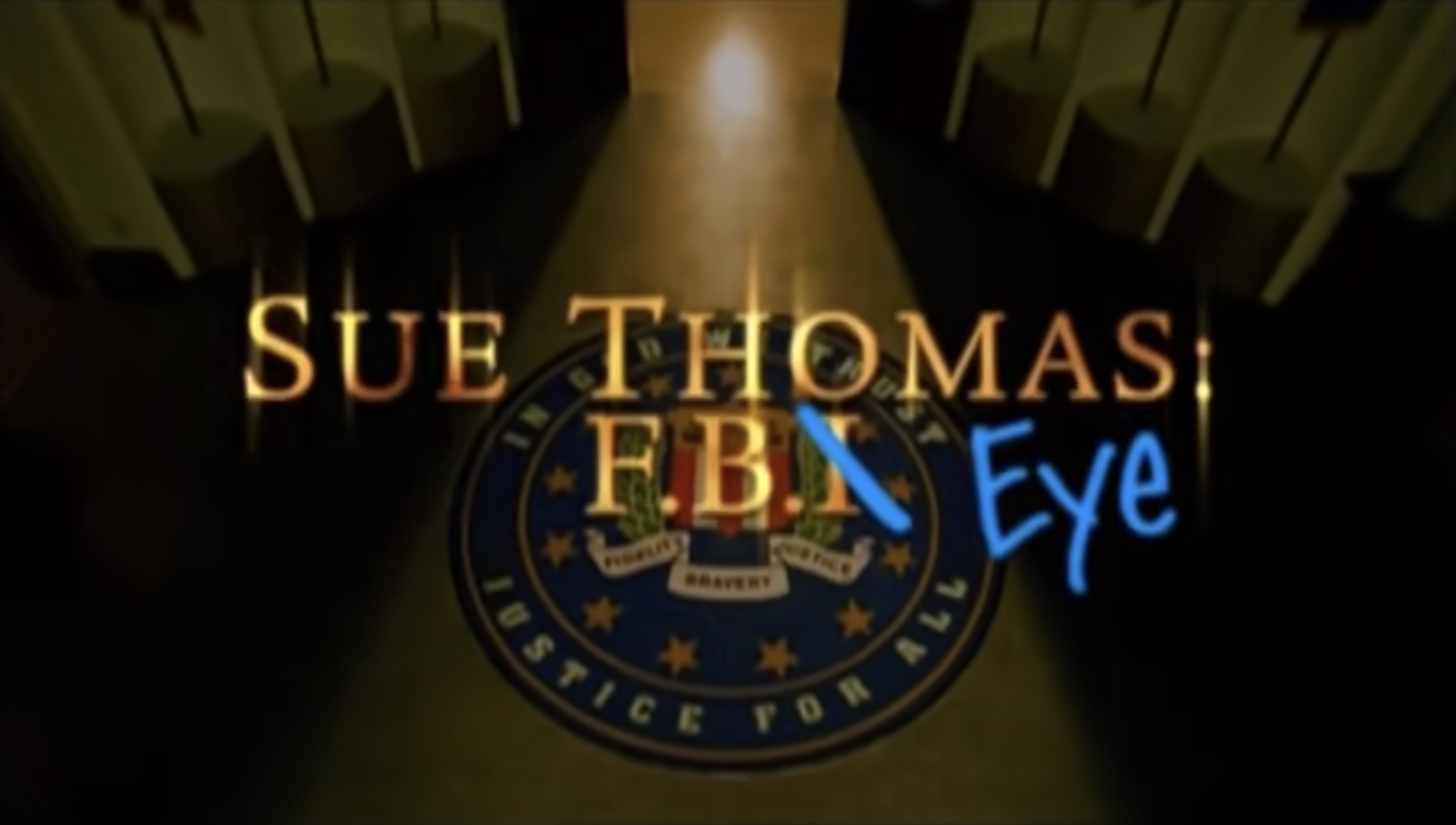
- Genre: Crime drama
- Created by: Dave Alan Johnson; Gary R. Johnson
- Starring: Deanne Bray; Yannick Bisson; Rick Peters; Enuka Okuma; Marc Gomes; Ted Atherton; Tara Samuel
- Opening theme: "Who I Am" by Jessica Andrews
- Countries of origin: United States; Canada
- Original language: English
- No. of seasons: 3
- No. of episodes: 56 (list of episodes)

Production
- Running time: 44–48 minutes
- Production companies: Pebblehut Productions; Paxson Entertainment

Original release
- Network: PAX TV
- Release: October 13, 2002 – May 22, 2005

Sue Thomas: F.B.Eye is a television series that premiered in 2002 on the PAX Network. The show ended in May 2005 due to PAX's decision to halt the production of original programming. It was one of the two highest-rated shows on the network, along with Doc.

== Premise ==
Sue Thomas: F.B.Eye is loosely based on the real-life experience of Sue Thomas, a deaf woman whose lip-reading expertise landed her a job with an elite surveillance team at the FBI.

== Production ==
The series was created by Dave Alan Johnson and Gary R. Johnson for Pebblehut Productions. They also created another series, Doc, for PAX. Yuri Yakubiw was the cinematographer and Bill Layton was the art director.

Though set in Washington, D.C., except for some exterior scenery shots, all the episodes were shot in and around Toronto, Canada. More than half of the cast and production crew were Canadian.

The series was once known as Lip Service. Its theme song is "Who I Am", sung by Jessica Andrews. The song was written by Brett James and Troy Verges.

=== Cancellation ===
The abrupt ending to the show was due to PAX's decision to discontinue producing original programming; not because of poor ratings. The last episode of the series ended with a title slate saying, "The End... for now."

== Characters ==
=== Main ===
==== Sue Thomas ====
Sue Thomas (played by Deanne Bray) is a young deaf woman who, like the real Sue Thomas, is able to communicate in both English and American Sign Language. Instead of attending a school for the deaf, Thomas was immersed in the hearing world. She took speech lessons, and she is able to vocalize her words to talk to people who are not deaf. She lip-reads to understand the other side of the conversation. The fictional representation of Sue Thomas has a college degree from Springfield College in Springfield, Massachusetts.

In the pilot episode, Thomas lands a position at FBI headquarters in Washington, D.C. She drives there from her home in Ohio. On the way, she picks up her first hearing dog, a Golden Retriever, Levi. The fictional Levi was abused by his former owners. Thomas says she knows what it is like to be rejected, so selects him from the hearing dog training program and trusts him to do his job. She talks to Levi frequently. Levi was played by two dogs in the show and was named after one of the hearing dogs of the real Sue Thomas. The two golden retrievers that played Levi in the series were trained by Sherri Davis, who also trained the German Shepherd dogs that played Rex in the Canadian series Hudson & Rex that began airing in 2019.

The real Sue Thomas appeared in two episodes of the series, playing an actress, Deanne Bray (the name of the actress who portrays her).

Thomas' parents were concerned that their deaf daughter would not be able to cope with life away from home, despite the fact that they taught her to live in both hearing and deaf settings. Her mother fought for her daughter to have every opportunity to live life to the fullest, which has made Sue an independent young woman.

She signs, speaks, reads lips, ice skates, plays piano and dances. She stopped skating when her best friend died in a bus crash on the way to a competition that Sue would have skated in had she won first place. Thomas feels survivor's guilt strongly because her deafness may be the reason she was not on the same bus. At her competition, she could not correct her mistake because she could not hear when she lost her place in her routine, and did not finish. In the show's opening credits, she is seen happily roller skating on the sidewalks of Washington with the encouragement of her co-workers after she tells her story to her FBI supervisor, Jack Hudson. The real Sue Thomas was an expert roller skater.

Thomas arrives at her job only to find she has been assigned to "Special Projects", with the mundane task of analyzing fingerprints. She rejects the assignment which she considers mundane, she boldly marches into the supposed personnel office to tell them exactly what she thinks. Having done this, she discovers that the personnel office has been relocated without changing the room number on the directory in the lobby. She also learns that the man she has just berated about her boring assignment is not personnel staff, but Special Agent Jack Hudson.

Impressed by her ambition, Hudson meets her at lunch where he tests her skills by having her lip-read what his team member Myles is saying across the room. He then arranges for her to transfer to his office. Thomas joins Hudson's team as a Special Investigative Analyst. Her valued contribution consists of translating what people are saying during surveillance missions, on the spot or on video recordings, and serving as an expert witness in court. Her approachable manner helps her appeal to various sources and suspects, so she acts as the good cop in interrogations.

==== Jack Hudson ====
Jack Hudson (played by Yannick Bisson) is the unit leader; he therefore generally is the lead in the team's cases. A lawyer from Wisconsin, he approaches his job as a federal agent with a burning drive. His experience as a sniper is revealed in the episode "The Sniper". Hudson is the team's supervisor and Thomas' trainer.

People sense the attraction between the fictional Thomas and Hudson. Team members think their mission at work may bring them closer together, but they resist temptation. Team members eagerly plan how Jack and Sue will go undercover as a married couple. They also pay for Sue to win a date with Jack at a charity bachelor auction. Still, Jack and Sue refuse to go against what they think should be the Bureau's policy to avoid the appearance of favoritism. In the first episode, two team members were dating each other (Myles and Lucy). In the last episode, during which Sue decides to leave, it becomes possible for them to get together. The two have a firm, if complicated, friendship. His closest friends are Special Agents Manning and Gans.

==== Bobby Manning ====
Bobby Manning (played by Rick Peters) is a charming Australian. He provides a much-needed sense of humour and is best mates with Jack. They are similar ages and share a love of sports and the single life. Bobby is also a recovering gambling addict, and still attends Gamblers' Anonymous. However, only Jack knows about this, as it could effectively mean the end of Bobby's career with the FBI; Bobby experienced a relapse in "The Gambler", when an undercover operation required him to infiltrate a poker game to capture a notorious criminal, but after he lost most of the money donated by the FBI in a game outside the official match, he played one final game with the criminals he had been infiltrating to win back the money and then called the operation off. From the first season, Bobby dated Darcy D'Angelo (Polly Shannon), a journalist who initially wrote a very scathing story on the FBI before Bobby's genuinely emotional appeal won over her cynical point of view, but the two broke up in the third season when Darcy accepted an offer of a high-profile job in Los Angeles. Shortly after this, he and Tara discover a mutual attraction, and they eventually kiss in the episode "Troy Story", although they decide not to follow it up at the time. Bobby is highly protective of the women he works with. When he was a child, his father left his mother, but she has since remarried. Bobby is close to both his mother and stepfather, who still live someplace in Australia. He has a bitter relationship with his biological father, although it improves after his father helps the team track down a notorious criminal and returns to prison when he could have escaped. He is the only one in the office other than Myles who knows very few signs. As Manning, Rick Peters played an Elvis impersonator in an episode.

==== Dimitrius Gans ====
Dimitrius (played by Marc Gomes) is the father figure in the office, and the senior agent in terms of age and experience. He had a more sympathetic approach to Sue's mistakes early in her career; when she accidentally jeopardized a case when she broke into a suspect's garage without a legal warrant to acquire evidence that the suspect was involved in planning a bombing, Dimitrius helped Sue redeem her mistake by confirming that she saw the suspect mention a key contact outside his garage, at a location where Sue could clearly see him from outside the building with no warrant required for her observation. He is the only married member of the team, and has two children: Tanya and Davy. In season two his wife, Donna, suffered a miscarriage of what would have been their third child. "D" often assumes the role of acting supervisor when the unit's normal supervisor is called out of the office.

==== Myles Leland III ====
Myles (played by Ted Atherton) is a Harvard-educated Bostonian. He has a high opinion of both himself and his skills, and considers himself a cut above the rest of the team. He suffers a serious lack of a sense of humour, and is often the butt of the office jokes and other practical jokes. From the start he mistrusts Sue's place on the team and actively tries to have her removed when a new supervisor is appointed. This backfires, with the supervisor instead contemplating replacing Myles because he was seen as a disruptive influence on the team, and Sue ends up saving Myles' place on the team by arguing that he helps to keep them together even if he does this by driving the team to unite against him. Over time Myles' relationship with Sue improved significantly, and the character becomes more relaxed in the office after his near-death experience. He once dated Lucy, but when she found out he was cheating on her, she dumped him. Their working relationship is polite, but frosty. Myles has a difficult relationship with his parents and only recently started forging a proper relationship with his sister, Anne, after the team investigated a case in her law firm, noting that he was actually closer to Sue than Anne.

==== Lucy Dotson ====
Lucy (played by Enuka Okuma) is Sue's roommate and best friend. She is the team rotor, the unit's office manager and "base coordinator." Lucy was the first to have a close connection with Sue and was there to help encourage her and help her find her voice within her duties. She was the first to really attempt to get to know her on a personal level within the team even going as far as becoming a student of ASL. She is close to her mother, although her father died some years ago. She gets involved when her mother is about to get married and she investigates her mother's suitor, eventually finding out that he's a con-man with multiple wives he's deserted. She is also close to her paternal grandmother. Lucy also dated Myles briefly, which ended badly when Sue discovered that Myles was cheating on Lucy. Lucy reunites with an old boyfriend, the only other man she dates in the show, and ends it abruptly with the realization that she's grown as a person and no longer suited for him. She's pleased with who she's becoming and at the end of the show she attributes part of her growth to Sue.

==== Tara Williams ====
Tara (played by Tara Samuel) is the unit's computer expert, adept at tracking perpetrators via bank records, computer hard drives, GPS tracking and other cyber-sources. Tara is a fully trained and armed Special Agent. However she can give the impression of being shy, dizzy, and a ditz when immersed in her world of computers. She is best friends with Lucy and Sue and they often go out together. By the second season, Tara manages to get a second monitor display for her computer so that Sue can see the information being displayed and read her colleagues' lips at the same time. Tara made her first kill in "Bad Hair Day", when a robber ran into a hair salon while Tara was getting a new haircut and threatened the customers, resulting in her suppressing her emotional reaction to the death until the robber's brother was caught as he attempted to kill Tara in revenge. Tara has dated Stanley Abbott, a steganographer who works for the National Security Agency. In a two-episode series, "The Actor" and "Planes, Trains, And Automobiles", Tara is interested in a movie star named Adam Kinsey. However, when Stanley shows up to help break a code and work with Tara, her relationship with Adam ends. In season three, she and Bobby Manning discover a mutual attraction.

==== Levi ====
Levi (played by "Jesse") is Sue's hearing dog, a Golden Retriever who was rescued after an abusive background that leaves him particularly jumpy around sudden loud noises, to the extent that the centre owners were doubtful he would ever be trainable. He is protective of Sue and loving to everyone, even going along with some of their jokes, such as when the team set up a small desk for Levi on Sue's first official day with the team. Several episodes find Levi in difficult and dramatic situations, such as getting lost in the city of D.C. after his new flea medication made him so hyperactive he ran away while staying with Charlie, or getting shot while trying to protect Sue (Jack actually used his credentials to get Levi treated in an actual hospital rather than a standard vet's). He is very clever, once managing to work a freight elevator when he became trapped inside a warehouse so that he could get to a different level and get out of the building and back to Sue, and has been trained to press the elevator buttons when given the right signal, as well as once being used to record key evidence to prove that a construction crew were performing shoddy work to let them steal houses. He is also playful, jumping onto her when drawing her attention to something, and is so dedicated to his job he tried to attract Sue's attention when he was in the hospital and had just awoken from a coma. The entire team adores him, which often leads to him being used to assist in minor pranks around the office. He is also a source of comfort during distressed or somber scenes in many episodes, usually placing his head on the suffering party's knee and whining empathetically. [The character name of Levi is the name of the first service dog of the real Sue Thomas.]

=== Recurring ===
- Ted Garrett (Eugene Clark) – The team's supervisor, beginning with the season one episode "The Signing" through the midpoint of season three (16 episodes)
- Charlie Adams (Jack Jessop) – The owner of a garage and filling station, he was Sue's first friend in Washington when she went to his station after her car began acting up on the way into the city. He began to lose his hearing in the second season, which he had trouble accepting, but Sue encouraged him to get hearing aids. He once introduced the team to the daughter of an old friend of his who was a cop, thus directing the team to conclude a serial killer case where Charlie's friend had unwittingly arrested the wrong man. (9 episodes)
- Howie Fines (Jonathan Wilson) – Sue's first informant, a talkative sanguine, whose eager attitude often annoys the agents (8 episodes)
- Randy Pitts (Ed Sahely) – The bespectacled, nasal, and cynical finance manager who often clashes with Myles and occasionally the entire office, making Myles in particular jump through several hoops before conceding to their requests. In "Who Wants to Be a Millionaire", Randy approached Sue for help in learning a few signs after a woman he'd been communicating with online turned out to be deaf. In "Mind Games" he indirectly "helped" the team deal with their incompetent temporary supervisor, Wayne Morris, the team tricking Wayne into exposing his true incompetence on record unless he resigned and accepted a relocation to Randy's department. (6 episodes)
- Troy Myers (Troy Kotsur) – Reformed criminal and former car thief who works for Charlie while studying at art school. He retains some of his old underworld contacts; one episode saw him putting the team in contact with a drug dealer who could prove that a DEA agent was corrupt after the agent tried to blame Sue for a botched sting operation. Another episode saw him reunited with his brother, the two having drifted apart in high school, when his brother revealed that his son and Troy's nephew was also deaf. He is played by Deanne Bray's husband (5 episodes)
- Stan Eldridge (Charles W. Gray) – The team's first supervisor; he was transferred to DoD in "The Signing"
- Amanda Duffman (Sammi Bourgeois) – A deaf girl who befriends Sue after seeing a talk Sue gave at her school; Amanda later came to the FBI to report a kidnapping, and even became the subject of a book written by an author who had initially contemplated shadowing Myles. She adopted a dog she found in a park when the original owner decided that he was unable to properly care for his pet. One episode saw her staying with Sue and Lucy for a week and seeking help in impressing a boy she had a crush on at school. (4 episodes)

=== Cameos ===
- The real Sue Thomas appears in the episode "Billy The Kid". Thomas, who acted as a consultant for the show, plays a deaf actress named Deanne (a parody of lead actress Deanne Bray, who is also deaf). She meets the character Sue Thomas (played by Bray) in the hospital and has a quick chat with her. She plays the same role in the final episode.
- Chantal Craig, who is married to Bisson (who plays Jack Hudson), appears in the episodes "The Signing", "Missing", and "The Hunter" as Lt./Det. Diana Grove, offering them information about a current case.

== Episodes ==
| Season | Episodes | Originally released | |
| Season | Episodes | First released | Last released |
|---|---|---|---|
| 1 | 19 | October 13, 2002 | May 18, 2003 |
| 2 | 19 | October 5, 2003 | May 23, 2004 |
| 3 | 19 | October 3, 2004 | May 22, 2005 |

== Broadcast history ==
The television series premiered in the United States in 2002 on PAX TV and Canada in 2003 on CTV. The show ended in May 2005 due to PAX's decision to no longer produce original programming. It was one of the two highest rated shows on PAX, along with Doc.

In September 2009, Gospel Music Channel began running the show, airing Monday through Thursday at 8 p.m. EST. In October 2009, American Life Network began running the show, airing it Monday through Friday at 7 p.m. EST. But due to ALN's rebranding to Youtoo TV, the show was dropped. In 2010, it began airing on Alibi in the United Kingdom. In September 2020, Sony Channel began airing the series. Reruns also air regularly on CTV and VisionTV in Canada.

On September 9, 2012, INSP began airing the series. On October 1, 2012, BYUtv added the series to their broadcast schedule and aired it through May 1, 2015.

On October 15, 2019, Start TV began airing the series.

As of 2023, Sue Thomas: F.B.Eye is available for streaming on The Roku Channel.

TeleXitos started airing the show for the first time ever in Spanish on December 28, 2023.

As of 2024, it was airing on Prime Video and IonPlus (via Xumo Play and streaming).

== DVD releases ==
Integrity Direct, a religious video/music company, has begun releasing Sue Thomas: F.B. Eye on DVD in Region 1 for the very first time. Volume 1, featuring the first 11 episode from season one was released on November 10, 2009. Volumes 2–5, which feature the remaining season one episodes as well as all episodes from seasons two and three were released on May 18, 2010. In addition, a complete series box set featuring all 56 episodes of the series was also released on May 18, 2010.

| DVD name | Episodes | Release date |
|---|---|---|
| Sue Thomas F.B.Eye: Volume 1 | 11 | November 10, 2009 |
| Sue Thomas F.B.Eye: Volume 2 | 11 | May 18, 2010 |
| Sue Thomas F.B.Eye: Volume 3 | 11 | May 18, 2010 |
| Sue Thomas F.B.Eye: Volume 4 | 11 | May 18, 2010 |
| Sue Thomas F.B.Eye: Volume 5 | 12 | May 18, 2010 |
| Sue Thomas F.B.Eye: The Complete Series | 56 | May 18, 2010 |
