= Deanne Bray =

American actress (born 1971)

- Born: May 14, 1971 (age 55)
- Years active: 1995–present

Deanne Bray (born May 14, 1971) is an American actress. Bray was born deaf and is multilingual in American Sign Language, British Sign Language, and English. She is also known as Deanne Bray-Kotsur.

== Early life and education ==
Bray's parents made certain their daughter was taught from an early age to speak and write English and learn American Sign Language as well, sending her through a variety of learning programs and centers to strengthen her language skills.

A California native, Bray broke into the entertainment industry after she was discovered performing with a deaf dancing group called "Prism West" at a Deaf festival at California State University, Northridge, where she earned a bachelor's degree in biology. She received a master's degree in sign language education in 2013.

== Career ==
Bray is best known for her role as Sue Thomas in the show Sue Thomas: F.B.Eye and has also had a recurring role as Emma Coolidge on Heroes, as well as being a co-host with Missy Keast on the DVD Your Pregnancy: What To Expect, a comprehensive resource for pregnant deaf and hard of hearing women.

Bray is also an advocate for improving early childhood education for deaf children and is a spokesperson for Language Equality and Acquisition for Deaf Kids (LEAD-K).

Bray taught American Sign Language (ASL) at Oak Park High School in Oak Park, California, from 2013 to 2021.

== Filmography ==
=== Film ===
Year	Title	Role	Notes
1996	What Do Women Want	Sharon	
2005	Last Mountain	Blonde Annie	
2007	I See the Crowd Roar: The Story of William Dummy Hoy	Anna	Documentary short
2008	Universal Signs	Natalie	
2013	No Ordinary Hero: The SuperDeafy Movie	ASL Advocate	
2016	Wild Prairie Rose	Cafeteria Worker	

=== Theatre ===
Year	Title	Role	Notes
2018	Arrival and Departure	Emily	Theater

=== Television ===
Year	Title	Role	Notes
1995	Ed McBain's 87th Precinct: Lightning	Teddy Franklin	TV film
1996	The Pretender	Deaf Woman	Episode: "Flyer"
1997	Ellen	Juliet	Episode: "Ellen's Deaf Comedy Jam"
1997	Diagnosis: Murder	Jan Curran	Episode: "Murder, Country Style"
2001	Strong Medicine	Sonny	Episode: "Fix"
2001	CSI: Crime Scene Investigation	Dr. Gilbert	Episode: "Sounds of Silence"
2002–2005	Sue Thomas: F.B.Eye	Sue Thomas	Lead role (56 episodes)
2003	L.A. Sheriff's Homicide	Technician	TV film
2006	Rescue Me	RoseMary	Episode: "Hell"
2007	Law & Order: Criminal Intent	Dean Price	Episode: "Silencer"
2007	Curb Your Enthusiasm	Jean	Episode: "The Rat Dog"
2007	The L Word	Amy Reed	Episodes: "Lacy Lilting Lyrics", "Little Boy Blue"
2008	The L Word	Amy Reed	Episodes: "Lesbians Gone Wild", "Lay Down the Law"
2008	Sweet Nothing in My Ear	Dr. Walters	TV film
2009–2010	Heroes	Emma Coolidge	Recurring role (9 episodes)
2013	2 Broke Girls	Joanne	Episode: "And Not-So-Sweet Charity"
2014	Grey's Anatomy	Nicole	Episode: "Go It Alone"
2014	Switched at Birth	Dean of Gallaudet	Episode: "It Isn't What You Think"
2017	Veep	Julie	Episode: "Qatar"
2022	Santa Bootcamp	Olive	TV film
2025	Will Trent	Ruth Galarza	Episode: “Best of Your Recollection”
2026	Walt Disney Animation Studios Songs in Sign Language	ASL Reference and Choreographer: Anna	Episode: "The Next Right Thing"
