= Jessica Andrews =

American country music singer

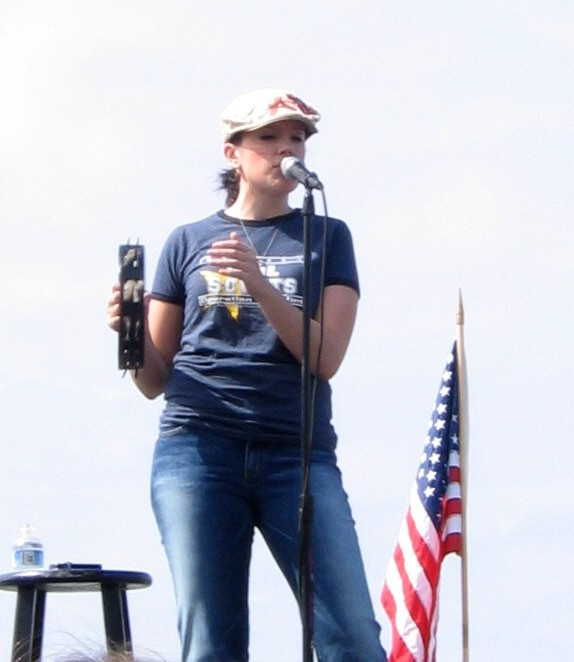
- Andrews in 2008

Background information
- Born: Jessica Danielle Andrews; December 29, 1983 (age 42); Huntingdon, Tennessee, U.S.
- Origin: Nashville, Tennessee, U.S.
- Genre: Country
- Occupations: Singer, songwriter
- Instrument: Vocals
- Years active: 1995–present
- Labels: DreamWorks Nashville, Carolwood
- Spouse: Marcel (m. 2011)

Jessica Danielle Andrews Chagnon (born December 29, 1983) is an American country music singer. At age 15 in mid-1999, she made her debut on the Billboard Hot Country Singles & Tracks (now Hot Country Songs) charts with the single "I Will Be There for You", from her debut album Heart Shaped World, released in 1999 on DreamWorks Records Nashville. Andrews had her biggest chart success in 2001 with the song "Who I Am", a No. 1 country hit and the title track of her second studio album, which was certified gold in the United States. A third album, Now was released in 2003 to lower sales, while a fourth album (tentatively titled Ain't That Life) was never released due to DreamWorks' closure. In late 2008, Andrews signed to Carolwood Records, an imprint of Lyric Street Records, however, she was dropped from the label in 2009 without issuing an album. Andrews has been married to Marcel, a singer-songwriter and music video director, since 2011.

== Early life ==
Jessica Danielle Andrews was born in Huntingdon, Tennessee, to parents Jessie and Vicki Andrews. When she was seven, a bone was growing through her spinal cord, a condition that required surgery. She had a 50/50 chance of coming out of it paralyzed. Andrews discovered her passion for singing in the fourth grade. Andrews planned on dancing in her school's talent show, but her sister convinced her to sing Dolly Parton's "I Will Always Love You" instead. At 11, she put her first band together. Meanwhile, after someone sent a song of her singing to producer Byron Gallimore, Andrews signed with DreamWorks Records Nashville and soon began working on her first album. Prior to its release, she began opening for Faith Hill on her Fall 1998 tour, as well as for Tim McGraw (also produced by Gallimore) for his New Year's Eve concert.

== Career ==
=== 1999–2001: Heart Shaped World ===
At the age of 15, Andrews released her debut album, Heart Shaped World. Gallimore, who was sensitive to her age, let her record 50 songs before settling on the 12 that appear on the album. Serving as its debut single was "I Will Be There for You", which Andrews had recorded in November 1998 for the Nashville soundtrack to the DreamWorks Animation film The Prince of Egypt. The song reached No. 28 on the Billboard Hot Country Singles & Tracks (now Hot Country Songs) charts in 1999. In March of that year, she also performed the song on an episode of the soap opera Another World; One month later, she made her debut on the Grand Ole Opry. Also in 2000, she toured with Trisha Yearwood. Heart Shaped World also produced two more Top 40 country singles in "You Go First (Do You Wanna Kiss)" and "Unbreakable Heart", although the fourth single ("I Do Now") failed to reach Top 40. The album itself peaked at No. 24 on the Top Country Albums charts. Andrews was also featured on the premiere episode of On the Verge, a television series on CMT which followed the careers of up-and-coming country artists. On May 3, 2000, Andrews was invited to sing "Unbreakable Heart" at the 2000 Academy of Country Music awards, where she won the award for Top New Female Vocalist.

=== 2001–2003: Who I Am ===
Who I Am was the title of Andrews' second album, released in 2001. It was used as the theme song for the police drama Sue Thomas: F.B.Eye where the main character Sue Thomas (played by deaf actress Deanne Bray) was a deaf FBI officer, landing a position in an FBI Surveillance team thanks to her lip reading skills. It also appeared at the end of an episode of Lizzie McGuire.

Andrews, who was 17 years old when Who I Am was recorded, described the album as a more mature effort than Heart Shaped World, because it focused more on the emotions that come with growing up. Serving as the album's lead-off single, "Who I Am" became, to date, Andrews' only Number One (and only Top Ten) hit on the country music charts, in addition to peaking at No. 28 on both the Billboard Hot 100 and Hot Adult Contemporary Tracks charts. In a 2001 interview, Andrews explained that she recorded the song (which was written by Brett James and Troy Verges) because she felt that its lyrics were especially fitting to her own life: "Everything is so true in that song, except that my grandmother's name is not Rosemary. It's about believing in yourself and being supported by those around you. No matter how many mistakes you make, your friends and family will be there for you." Also included on the album was Andrews' first songwriting credit in the track "Good Friend to Me", which she co-wrote with Annie Roboff and Bekka Bramlett.

Andrews spent 2001 on tour with Billy Gilman to help promote her second album and its lead-off single; she later toured with Tim McGraw as well. The success of "Who I Am" also earned her a nomination for the Horizon award at the 2001 Country Music Association awards, while the album itself received RIAA gold certification for sales of 500,000 copies only four weeks after its release. Its second and third singles, "Helplessly, Hopelessly" and "Karma", peaked at No. 31 and No. 47, respectively, on the country charts.

=== 2003–2005: Now and Ain't That Life ===
Now was the title of Andrews' third studio album, also released on DreamWorks Nashville. Its lead-off single, "There's More to Me Than You", reached Top 20 on the country singles charts, while the second (and final) single, "Good Time", failed to make Top 40. The album featured more of an emphasis on ballads than her first two albums did. Also in 2003, she befriended and began dating songwriter Marcel, co-writer of "There's More to Me Than You". She also recorded a duet with him titled "I Won't Hold You Down" on his 2003 debut album You, Me and the Windshield.

In late 2004, Andrews charted a duet with Bret Michaels of the rock band Poison, entitled "All I Ever Needed" for his solo album Freedom of Sound. The song was Michaels' only country hit, peaking at No. 45. Shortly afterward, Andrews began work on her fourth studio album, tentatively titled Ain't That Life. Its lead-off single, "The Marrying Kind", failed to chart, while "Summer Girl", the second single, peaked at No. 46 in mid-2005. DreamWorks' recording division was dissolved shortly afterward and the album was shelved.

=== 2008–present ===
Andrews performed a duet with pop artist Richard Marx titled "Wild Horses", which was released on his 2008 album Sundown. In October 2008, Andrews signed with Lyric Street Records's subsidiary imprint, Carolwood Records. Her first single for the label, "Everything" (which Andrews co-wrote with Marcel), was released on November 23, 2008. The song, produced by Jay DeMarcus of Rascal Flatts, went to No. 45 in early 2009. Her album was then pushed back to a later 2009 release; but in October of that year, Carolwood Records closed and the album was shelved. Additionally, Andrews was the only artist on Carolwood not to be transferred to its parent label, Lyric Street.

On November 2, 2010, Geffen Records released Andrews' first greatest hits album, Icon, as part of their Icon budget release series.

== Personal life ==
In October 2010, Andrews became engaged to Marcel Chagnon, a singer-songwriter and music video director often credited as just Marcel. They were married on November 11, 2011. On September 30, 2017, Andrews announced that she was expecting a baby boy with Chagnon. In 2018, Andrews gave birth to a son.

== Discography ==
=== Studio albums ===
Title	Album details	Peak chart positions			Certifications (sales threshold)
Title	Album details	US Country	US	US Heat	Certifications (sales threshold)
Heart Shaped World	Release date: March 23, 1999; Label: DreamWorks Nashville; Formats: CD, cassette	24	—	15	
Who I Am	Release date: February 27, 2001; Label: DreamWorks Nashville; Formats: CD, cassette	2	22	—	RIAA: Gold
Now	Release date: April 15, 2003; Label: DreamWorks Nashville; Formats: CD, cassette	4	34	—	
"—" denotes releases that did not chart

=== Compilation albums ===
Title	Album details
Icon	Release date: November 2, 2010; Label: Geffen Records; Formats: CD, music download

=== Singles ===
Year	Single	Peak chart positions					Album
Year	Single	US Country	US	US AC	US Latin Pop	CAN Country	Album
1999	"I Will Be There for You"	28	— (Note: "I Will Be There for You" did not enter the Billboard Hot 100, but peaked at number 8 on Bubbling Under Hot 100 Singles.)	—	—	43	Heart Shaped World
1999	"You Go First (Do You Wanna Kiss)"	25	— (Note: "You Go First (Do You Wanna Kiss)" did not enter the Billboard Hot 100, but peaked at number 17 on Bubbling Under Hot 100 Singles.)	—	—	43	Heart Shaped World
2000	"Unbreakable Heart"	24	— (Note: "Unbreakable Heart" did not enter the Billboard Hot 100, but peaked at number 10 on Bubbling Under Hot 100 Singles.)	—	—	43	Heart Shaped World
2000	"I Do Now"	53	—	—	—	—N/a	Heart Shaped World
2000	"Who I Am"	1	28	24	20	—N/a	Who I Am
2001	"Helplessly, Hopelessly"	31	—	—	—	—N/a	Who I Am
2002	"Karma"	47	—	—	—	—N/a	Who I Am
2002	"There's More to Me Than You"	17	— (Note: "There's More to Me Than You" did not enter the Billboard Hot 100, but peaked at number 8 on Bubbling Under Hot 100 Singles.)	—	—	—N/a	Now
2003	"Good Time"	49	—	—	—	—N/a	Now
2005	"The Marrying Kind"	—	—	—	—	—N/a	Ain't That Life (unreleased)
2005	"Summer Girl"	46	—	—	—	—N/a	Ain't That Life (unreleased)
2008	"Everything"	45	—	—	—	—N/a	—N/a
"—" denotes that the song did not chart or was not released to that format

=== Featured singles ===
Year	Single	Artist	Peak positions	Album
Year	Single	Artist	US Country	Album
2004	"All I Ever Needed"	Bret Michaels	45	Freedom of Sound

=== Music videos ===
Year	Video	Director
1999	"I Will Be There for You"	Brent Hedgecock
1999	"You Go First (Do You Wanna Kiss)"	Trey Fanjoy
1999	"Unbreakable Heart"	David Rogan
2000	"Who I Am"	Jon Ragel
2001	"Helplessly, Hopelessly"	Steven Goldmann
2001	"Karma"	Steven Goldmann
2003	"There's More to Me Than You"	Adolfo Doring
2003	"There's More to Me Than You" (ballad)	Adolfo Doring
2003	"Good Time"	Trey Fanjoy
