= Sue Thomas (FBI specialist) =

American author (1950–2022)

- Born: May 24, 1950; Boardman, Ohio
- Died: December 13, 2022 (aged 72); Columbiana, Ohio
- Education: Springfield College
- Occupations: Author; FBI agent

Sue Thomas (May 24, 1950 – December 13, 2022) was an American author and former agent of the Federal Bureau of Investigation (FBI). She was the first deaf person to work as an undercover specialist, performing lip-reading of suspects.

== Early life ==
Thomas was born on May 24, 1950, in Boardman, Ohio. At the age of 18 months, she became profoundly deaf; the reason is not definitely known. At the age of seven, Thomas became the youngest Ohio State Champion free-style skater in skating history. Speech therapists helped her develop her voice, and she also became an adept lip reader.

When her deafness was discovered, the doctors suggested to Sue's parents that she be institutionalized. Her parents refused. Instead they encouraged her to do things that any other child might do, including learning to play piano. Sue told interviewer Moira Brown that when she was learning piano, she would have much rather gone outside to play football with her brothers: "But my mother who loved music, would say to me, 'One day you are going to thank me for this.'"

Thomas graduated from Springfield College in Massachusetts with a degree in political science and international affairs.

== Career in the FBI ==
At the FBI, Thomas started out as a fingerprint examiner, then she became a lip-reader for an undercover surveillance team. Thomas spent four years working for the FBI, from 1979 to 1983. In an interview with Nancy DeMoss Wolgemuth Sue described the FBI working on a case in which they had video filmed the suspect, but even though the camera had been activated, the sound mechanism failed. "They had all this film with the bad guy talking, but they couldn't hear him." Realizing that Sue could read lips they asked her "... if I would watch it and write down any words. ... From that day on I never went back to reading fingerprints. I read lips for the FBI. ... I became known as 'the secret weapon for the FBI."

== Writing ==
In 1990, Thomas wrote her autobiography entitled Silent Night, which became the basis for the TV series to follow. This book begins when she lost her hearing at 18 months and chronicles her life all the way through to her resignation from the FBI. The continuing story of her life is called Staying in the Race, in which Thomas shares stories about living with multiple sclerosis.

== TV series ==
In 2002, the TV series Sue Thomas: F.B.Eye, created jointly by Dave Alan Johnson and Gary R. Johnson, premiered on the Pax TV first-run syndication network. Inspired by Thomas's unique job for the FBI, the weekly drama helped to bring more awareness to the lives and abilities of people with physical disabilities. The series starred actress Deanne Bray, who is herself deaf, and reads lips like Thomas, and it was loosely based on Thomas's real experiences. At its peak, the series was watched by more than 2.5 million viewers in the United States, and it was syndicated to 60 nations. In September 2009, the show began airing on Gospel Music Channel.

In addition to Bray, the cast of Sue Thomas: F.B.Eye included actors Yannick Bisson, Rick Peters, Mark Gomes, Tara Samuel, Ted Atherton, and Enuka Okuma. A golden retriever who responded to the name of Jesse stood in during the run of the program for Thomas's real golden retriever, who responded to the name of Levi. Marilyn Stonehouse served as the chief producer for the Pebblehut Productions company, through which Sue Thomas: F.B.Eye was produced.

Sue Thomas appeared in two episodes: "Billy the Kid" (aka: "Question Mark") and the series finale, "Ending and Beginnings".

== Personal life ==
In 2001, Thomas was diagnosed with multiple sclerosis. In 2020, she was diagnosed with lung cancer, though the following year, she said she was cancer-free. Thomas died on December 13, 2022.
