= Helplessly, Hopelessly =

Single by Jessica Andrews

from the album Who I Am
- Released: June 9, 2001
- Genre: Country
- Length: 3:59
- Label: DreamWorks
- Songwriter(s): Brett James, Troy Verges
- Producer(s): Byron Gallimore

Jessica Andrews singles chronology
"Who I Am" (2000)	"Helplessly, Hopelessly" (2001)	"Karma" (2002)

"Helplessly, Hopelessly" is a song recorded by American country music artist Jessica Andrews. It was released in June 2001 as the second single from the album Who I Am. The song reached #31 on the Billboard Hot Country Singles & Tracks chart. The song was written by Brett James and Troy Verges.

== Chart performance ==
Chart (2001)	Peak position
US Hot Country Songs (Billboard)	31
