= The Prince of Egypt: Nashville =

1998 film soundtrack album

- Official album artwork

Soundtrack album by various artists
- Released: November 17, 1998
- Genre: Country
- Length: 72:50
- Label: DreamWorks Nashville
- Producers: Ron W. Griffin; James Stroud; Tony Brown; Michael Omartian; Byron Gallimore; David Malloy

Professional ratings
Review scores
Source	Rating
Allmusic	link

The Prince of Egypt: Nashville was one of three albums produced alongside the release of DreamWorks Animation's 1998 musical film, The Prince of Egypt, with original songs written by Stephen Schwartz and original score composed by Hans Zimmer. This country-themed album included songs inspired by the film, featuring prominent country acts.

It peaked at No. 6 and No. 8 on the Billboard Top Contemporary Christian and Top Country Albums charts, respectively.

== Track listing ==
1. "Freedom", performed by Wynonna Judd – 4:40
2. "Make It Through", performed by Randy Travis and Linda Davis – 3:56
3. "I Give You to His Heart", performed by Alison Krauss – 4:30
4. "Heartbeat of Hope", performed by Steven Curtis Chapman – 4:44
5. "Milk and Honey", performed by Pam Tillis – 4:00
6. "Once in a While", performed by Vince Gill – 3:36
7. "Walk in Glory", performed by Mindy McCready – 4:07
8. "Somewhere Down the Road", performed by Faith Hill – 5:38
9. "Please Be the One", performed by Reba McEntire – 3:09
10. "Slavery, Deliverance and Faith", performed by Clint Black – 4:28
11. "Godspeed", performed by Beth Nielsen Chapman – 3:16
12. "The Voice", performed by Alabama – 4:21
13. "You Are My Light", performed by Gary Chapman – 4:48
14. "The Moving of the Mountain", performed by Mac McAnally – 3:44
15. "I Will Be There for You", performed by Jessica Andrews – 3:19
16. "I Can't Be a Slave", performed by Toby Keith – 3:21
17. "Could It Be Me", performed by Charlie Daniels – 5:08

Two singles entered the Hot Country Singles & Tracks chart: Judd's rendition of "Freedom" at No. 68, and Andrews' "I Will Be There for You" at No. 28. The latter also peaked at No. 8 on Billboard's Bubbling Under Hot 100 chart.

== Charts ==
=== Weekly charts ===
Chart (1998–1999)	Peak position
Canadian Country Albums (RPM)	6
US Billboard 200	85
US Top Christian Albums (Billboard)	6
US Top Country Albums (Billboard)	8

=== Year-end charts ===
Chart (1999)	Position
US Top Country Albums (Billboard)	27

== Certifications ==
Region	Certification	Certified units/sales
United States (RIAA)	Gold	500,000^{^}
^{^} Shipments figures based on certification alone.
