= Troy Verges =

American songwriter

- Born: 20th-century
- Origin: Louisiana, United States
- Genres: Country, pop
- Occupation: Songwriter
- Years active: 2000s–present

Troy Verges is an American songwriter of country and pop music from Louisiana.

== Career ==
His first cut as a songwriter was a track on Faith Hill's Breathe. His credits include the singles "Wanted", recorded by Hunter Hayes; "Beer Money", recorded by Kip Moore; "Who I Am", recorded by Jessica Andrews; "Blessed", recorded by Martina McBride; "Wasted", recorded by Carrie Underwood; "Day Drinking", recorded by Little Big Town; "Shotgun Rider", recorded by Tim McGraw; and "I Want Crazy", recorded by Hunter Hayes – all of which went to number one on the country music charts.

"Wanted" was ACM nominated in 2013 for Song of the Year, while "I Want Crazy" received a 2014 Grammy nomination and "Day Drinking" received a 2015 Grammy nomination. "Wanted", composed by Hunter Hayes and Troy Verges, took home Song Of The Year honors at the 2013 BMI Country Awards. and was also named one of Billboard's top ten songs of the decade

He produced and mixed the Anders Osborne album Coming Down.

== Awards ==
Verges was named "Songwriter of the Year" in 2002 by Broadcast Music Incorporated and "Songwriter of the Year" by the Nashville Songwriters Association International.

In 2011, Verges garnered both and Oscar nomination and a Golden Globe nomination in the Best Original Song category for his composition "Coming Home" from the film Country Strong.

== List of songs co-written by Verges ==
(alphabetical by song title)

- Taylor Swift – "A Perfectly Good Heart"
- Jane Fonda, Diane Keaton, Mary Steenburgen, Candice Bergen - "Anywhere With You"
- Sara Evans – "Backseat of a Greyhound Bus"
- Kip Moore – "Beer Money"
- Kip Moore – "Bittersweet Company"
- Martina McBride – "Blessed"
- Kolby Cooper - "Breaking News"
- Marié Digby – "Breathing Underwater"
- Matt Nathanson – "Bulletproof Weeks"
- Trisha Yearwood – "Can't Take Back Goodbye"
- Chaley Rose (from The Music Of Nashville soundtrack) – "Carry You Home"
- Pia Toscano, Alexandra Kay, Taz Zavala (from the Westside soundtrack) – "Champagne High"
- Tim McGraw - "Christmas All Over The World"
- Carly Pearce – "Closer to You"
- Marié Digby – "Come Find Me"
- Kip Moore – "Come Home with You"
- Gwyneth Paltrow – "Coming Home"
- Carrie Underwood – "Crazy Dreams"
- Rascal Flatts – "Dance"
- Little Big Town – "Day Drinking"
- Kellie Pickler – "Didn't You Know How Much I Loved You"
- Jason Aldean – "Don't Give Up on Me"
- Trisha Yearwood – "Drink Up"
- Tim McGraw – "Drugs or Jesus"
- Cassadee Pope – "Everybody Sings"
- Caylee Hammack – "Family Tree"
- Kelleigh Bannen – "Famous"
- Kip Moore – "Fast Women"
- David Nail -"Fighter"
- Hunter Hayes – "Flashlight"
- Carolyn Dawn Johnson – "Georgia"
- Drake White – "Girl in Pieces"
- Maggie Rose – "Girl in Your Truck Song"
- Kip Moore – "Girl of the Summer"
- Craig Morgan – "God Must Really Love Me"
- David Nail – "Good at Tonight"
- Kip Moore – "Good Thing"
- Nitty Gritty Dirt Band – "Good to Be Alive"
- Mary Steenburgen - "Goodbye Baby" (from the A Man On The Inside soundtrack)
- Gordie Sampson – "Hanging by a Wire"
- Emerson Hart – "Hallway"
- Jessica Andrews – "Helplessly, Hopelessly"
- Kellie Pickler – "Happy"
- Backstreet Boys – "Helpless When She Smiles"
- Laura Bell Bundy – "I Am What I Am"
- Caitlyn Smith - "I Don't Like The World Without You"
- Caitlyn Smith – "I Don't Wanna Love You Anymore"
- Hunter Hayes – "I Want Crazy"
- Jessica Andrews - "I Wish For You"
- LeAnn Rimes – "I Wish I Was Wrong"
- Trisha Yearwood – "I Would've Loved You Anyway"
- Trisha Yearwood – "I'll Carry You Home"
- Kellie Pickler – "I'm Your Woman"
- Brantley Gilbert – "If You Want a Bad Boy"
- Dia Frampton – "Isabella"
- Rhonda Vincent – "I've Forgotten You"
- Steven Lee Olsen – "Just Married"
- Caylee Hammack – "King Size Bed"
- Caitlyn Smith - "Lately"
- Carrie Underwood – "Leave Love Alone"
- Joe Nichols – "Let's Get Drunk and Fight"
- Emerson Drive – "Lemonade"
- Brie Larson – "Life After You"
- Billy Ray Cyrus – "Like Nothing Else"
- Danielle Bradbery - "Look At The Mess I'm In"
- Marco Borsato & Sita – "Lopen Op Het Water"
- Faith Hill – "Love Is a Sweet Thing"
- Shelby Darrall - "Love Me When I'm Leavin"
- Darius Rucker – "Low Country"
- Jessica Simpson – "Man Enough"
- Caitlyn Smith – "Midnight In New York City"
- Jessica Simpson – "Might as Well Be Making Love"
- Celine Dion – "Naked"
- Jessica Andrews - "Never Be Forgotten"
- Sara Evans – "Niagara"
- Backstreet Boys – "No Place"
- Tori Kelly - "North Star"
- Hunter Hayes – "Nothing Like Starting Over"
- BoA – "Obsessed"
- Cassadee Pope – "One Song Away"
- Sara Evans – "Otis Redding"
- Faith Hill – "Paris"
- Brandy Clark - "Pawn Shop"
- Kelly Sweet – "Raincoat"
- Uncle Kracker - "Reason To Drink"
- Josh Dorr – "Rocket"
- Kip Moore – "Running for You"
- Katharine McPhee – "Say Goodbye"
- Zayn Malik & Simone Ashley - "See Me"
- Tim McGraw – "Shotgun Rider"
- Carolyn Dawn Johnson – "Simple Life"
- Tim McGraw — "Sleep Tonight"
- Brothers Osborne – "Slow Your Roll"
- Steven Tyler – "Somebody New"
- Hunter Hayes – "Someday Girl"
- Easton Corbin – "Someday When I'm Old"
- Jamey Johnson - "Someday When I'm Old"
- Matraca Berg – "South of Heaven"
- Maura O'Connell – "Spinning Wheel"
- Caitlyn Smith – "St. Paul"
- Backbone (Meat Loaf, John Rich, Lil Jon, Mark McGrath) – "Stand in the Storm"
- Hunter Hayes – "Still"
- Hunter Hayes – "Storyline"
- Faith Hill – "Stronger"
- Gordie Sampson – "Sunburn"
- Jessica Andrews - "Sunshine and Love"
- Hunter Hayes – "Tattoo"
- Tim McGraw, Josh Gracin – "Telluride"
- Trisha Yearwood – "Tell Me Something I Don't Know"
- Sarah Grace Buckley - "Tequila & Mexico"
- Lori McKenna – "The Bird & The Rifle" –
- Danielle Bradbery – "The Heart of Dixie"
- Il Divo – "The Man You Love"
- Paulina Rubio – "The One You Love (Todo Mi Amor)"
- Lindsay Lohan – "Very Last Moment in Time"
- Trace Adkins - "The Way I Wanna Go"
- Steven Lee Olsen – "There I Said It"
- Maura O'Connell – "There's No Good Day for Dying"
- Jon McLaughlin – "Things That You Say"
- Tara Oram – "Things I Should've Said"
- Steve Moakler – "Thirty"
- Annelise Cepero - "This Is Christmas" (from the "Holiday Harmony" soundtrack)
- Terri Clark – "Three Mississippi"
- Steven Lee Olsen – "Timing Is Everything"
- Andy Griggs – "Tonight I Wanna Be Your Man"
- Edens Edge – "Too Good to Be True"
- Steven Lee Olsen – "Undefeated"
- Martina McBride – "You're Not Leaving Me"
- Hunter Hayes – "Wanted"
- Carrie Underwood – "Wasted"
- Bon Jovi – "We Can Dance"
- Kat Higgins – "We Go Driving"
- Trisha Yearwood – "What Gave Me Away"
- Montgomery Gentry – "What It Takes"
- Kip Moore – "What Ya Got On Tonight"
- Tim McGraw – "What You're Looking For"
- Jessica Andrews – "Who I Am"
- Hunter Hayes – "Wild Blue"
- Danielle Bradbery – "Wild Boy"
- Jessica Andrews - "Windows On A Train"
- Lonestar – "With Me"
- Keith Urban —"You or Somebody Like You"
- Kenny Chesney – "You Save Me"
- Caitlyn Smith (from the A Dog's Perfect Christmas soundtrack) - "You Think You Know"
- High Valley – "Your Mama"
- Jason Aldean - "Your Mama"

== See also ==
- List of people from Louisiana
- List of songwriters
