= Josh Gracin (album) =

Studio album by Josh Gracin
- Released: June 15, 2004
- Recorded: 2004 at The Tracking Room, Sound Stage and The Mix Room, Nashville, TN
- Genre: Country
- Length: 39:41
- Label: Lyric Street
- Producer: Marty Williams

Josh Gracin chronology
Josh Gracin (2004)	We Weren't Crazy (2008)

Singles from Josh Gracin
- 1. "I Want to Live" Released: March 1, 2004; 2. "Nothin' to Lose" Released: August 31, 2004; 3. "Stay with Me (Brass Bed)" Released: April 11, 2005

Josh Gracin is the debut studio album by American country music singer Josh Gracin. It was released in the United States on June 15, 2004 on Lyric Street Records, reached number eleven on the Nielsen Soundscan album chart and sold 57,048 the first week. It garnered a Gold certification and has sales of 703,000 copies as of December 2010, one of only three by new male country singers introduced in four years to earn a gold album.

== Content ==
The tracks "I Want to Live", "Nothin' to Lose", and "Brass Bed" (which was re-titled "Stay with Me (Brass Bed)" upon release to radio) were all released as singles, peaking at number four, number one, and number five, respectively, on the country charts. "Nothin' to Lose" was originally recorded by its co-writer, Marcel, on his 2003 album You, Me and the Windshield.

The album was recorded while he was still serving in the Marine Corps, recording it when on leave, during holidays and weekends.

== Critical reception ==
Professional ratings
Review scores
Source	Rating
AllMusic	3/5 stars
USA Today	2/4 stars

Aaron Lathan of AllMusic commended producer Marty Williams for crafting an album that while mostly "a basic musical country stew," contains tracks that complement Gracin's vocal performance, saying "There is nothing daring or adventurous in the music or with Gracin himself, but that's just fine [...] it's remarkable that he was able to focus and record a consistent and pleasant debut." Brian Mansfield of USA Today highlighted "I Want to Live" and praised Gracin's delivery but felt he chose by-the-numbers country tracks for the album, concluding that, "[T]he rest of the songs could have been recorded by any already-forgotten singer at any time during the past five years."

== Track listing ==
No.	Title	Writer(s)	Length
1.	"I Want to Live"	Brett James; Rivers Rutherford	3:58
2.	"Wheels"	James; Fred Wilhelm	4:15
3.	"Nothin' to Lose"	Marcel; Kevin Savigar	2:36
4.	"Stay with Me (Brass Bed)"	James; Terry McBride; Jedd Hughes	4:15
5.	"Peace of Mind"	James; Troy Verges	3:58
6.	"Endless Helpless Hoping"	Kelly Garrett; Michael Kosser	3:20
7.	"No One to Share the Blame"	John Kennedy; Tammi Kidd	3:09
8.	"I Would Look Good with You"	Kennedy; Kidd	3:07
9.	"Turn It Up"	James; Thom McHugh	3:14
10.	"The Long One"	Kidd; Thom Schuyler; Steve Robson	3:47
11.	"The Other Little Soldier"	Curtis Wright; Candy Cameron	3:53

== Personnel ==
As listed in liner notes.

- Tim Akers - piano, keyboards, Hammond B-3 organ, accordion
- Larry Beaird - acoustic guitar
- Mike Brignardello - bass guitar on "Nothin' to Lose", "No One to Share the Blame" and "I Would Look Good with You"
- Eric Darken - percussion
- Dan Dugmore - steel guitar on "Nothin' to Lose", "No One to Share the Blame" and "The Other Little Soldier". lap steel guitar on "Turn It Up," Dobro on "I Would Look Good with You"
- Paul Franklin - steel guitar, lap steel guitar on "Endless Helpless Hoping"
- Josh Gracin - lead vocals
- Kirk "Jelly Roll" Johnson - harmonica on "Peace of Mind"
- Jerry McPherson - electric guitar
- Russell Terrell - background vocals
- Lonnie Wilson - drums
- Glenn Worf - bass guitar
- Jonathan Yudkin - fiddle, mandolin, cello, octofone, viola

== Chart performance ==
=== Weekly charts ===
Chart (2004)	Peak position
US Billboard 200	11
US Top Country Albums (Billboard)	2

=== Year-end charts ===
Chart (2004)	Position
US Top Country Albums (Billboard)	53
Chart (2005)	Position
US Top Country Albums (Billboard)	34

=== Singles ===
Year	Single	Chart Positions	
Year	Single	US Country	US
2004	"I Want to Live"	4	45
2004	"Nothin' to Lose"	1	39
2005	"Stay with Me (Brass Bed)"	5	47

=== Sales ===
US Sales
703,000

== Certifications ==
Region	Certification
United States (RIAA)	Gold
