= We Weren't Crazy =

Studio album by Josh Gracin
- Released: April 1, 2008
- Studios: Masterfonics, Nashville; Sound Stage, Nashville; Ocean Way, Nashville; Station West, Nashville
- Genre: Country
- Length: 42:36
- Label: Lyric Street
- Producers: Brett James; Marty Williams

Josh Gracin chronology
Josh Gracin (2004)	We Weren't Crazy (2008)	Redemption (2011)

Singles from We Weren't Crazy
- 1. "Favorite State of Mind" Released: February 27, 2006; 2. "I Keep Coming Back" Released: October 30, 2006; 3. "We Weren't Crazy" Released: October 29, 2007; 4. "Unbelievable (Ann Marie)" Released: August 25, 2008; 5. "Telluride" Released: December 15, 2008

We Weren't Crazy is the second studio album by American country music artist Josh Gracin. Originally titled All About Y'all, the album was slated for release in mid-2006 after the release of its debut single "Favorite State of Mind". However the album release was delayed when the debut single failed to perform strongly on radio. A second single, "I Keep Coming Back", was issued in early 2007, and the album's name was changed to I Keep Coming Back. This single similarly failed to perform well. The album was finally issued on April 1, 2008, as a limited release, following the release of its title track which was a top 10 hit.

Overall, the album's five singles have all charted in the Top 40 on the Hot Country Songs charts, including the number ten title track. Next came "Unbelievable (Ann Marie)" (a song that Josh Gracin wrote about his then-wife Ann Marie), which peaked at number 36, his least successful single to date, and "Telluride", which was previously recorded by Tim McGraw on his 2001 album Set This Circus Down, which peaked at number 34. "I Don't Want to Live" was recorded as "I Don't Wanna Live" by Chris Cagle on his 2008 album My Life's Been a Country Song. The album debuted at number four on the Billboard Top Country Albums chart.

Sales of We Weren't Crazy failed to meet those of Gracin's debut, with 18,000 units sold on its first week. He parted company with Lyric Street in April 2009 after the poor chart performance of "Telluride".

== Critical reception ==
Professional ratings
Review scores
Source	Rating
AllMusic	3.5/5 stars
The 9513	3.5/5 stars

AllMusic editor Thom Jurek called the album's content "formulaic contemporary country", but gave praise to tracks like the title track and "Telluride" as highlights and Gracin's vocal delivery for carrying the material effortlessly, concluding that "if anyone has a chance of making lightning strike twice it's him." The 9513's Jim Malec also gave praise to Gracin's performance on tracks that were "considerably substantive and surprisingly emotionally complex" on "a near flawless set of contemporary country material," but felt that it relied too heavily on tempo and lacked songs that contained emotional depth and intimacy for the listeners, concluding that "it is a solid effort that would greatly benefit from one or two standout ballads, and which, despite its many strengths, ultimately falls short of artistically exceptional." Ken Tucker of Billboard called it a "solid follow-up" based on the title track, "Favorite State of Mind", "Livin' It Up" and "Unbelievable (Ann Marie)". Rick Bell of Country Standard Time was critical of the album's production being "cluttered and uneven" throughout the track listing but called it "a safe, pleasant follow-up."

== Track listing ==
No.	Title	Writer(s)	Producer	Length
1.	"Found"	Matthew Prime; Steve McEwan; Gordie Sampson; Hillary Lindsey	Williams	3:54
2.	"We Weren't Crazy"	Bobby Pinson; Josh Gracin; Tony Lopacinski	James	3:47
3.	"Invisible"	Brett James; Dillon Dixon	James	4:38
4.	"Let Me Fall"	Patrick Clark; John Mason; Gracin	James	4:08
5.	"I Don't Want to Live"	James; Blair Daly	Williams	3:35
6.	"Favorite State of Mind"	Marcel; Daly	Williams	3:18
7.	"Telluride"	James; Troy Verges	James	3:53
8.	"I Keep Coming Back"	Jeffrey Steele; Steve Robson	Williams	3:51
9.	"Sweet September"	Derek George; Neil Thrasher	Williams	4:13
10.	"Livin' It Up"	James; Angelo Petraglia; Jodi Marr	James	4:06
11.	"Unbelievable (Ann Marie)"	Gracin	James	3:13

== Chart performance ==
=== Album ===
Chart (2008)	Peak position	US Sales
U.S. Billboard Top Country Albums	4	85,000
U.S. Billboard 200	33	85,000

=== Singles ===
Year	Single	Chart Positions	
Year	Single	US Country	US
2006	"Favorite State of Mind"	19	119
2006	"I Keep Coming Back"	28	—
2007	"We Weren't Crazy"	10	82
2008	"Unbelievable (Ann Marie)"	36	—
2008	"Telluride"	34	—

== Personnel ==
Adapted from the We Weren't Crazy liner notes.

Vocals

- Josh Gracin – lead vocals (all tracks)
- Russell Terrell – background vocals (1–3, 5–10)
- Brett James – background vocals (2, 3, 7, 10)
- Perry Coleman – background vocals (4, 11)
- Tom Bukovac – background vocals (9)
- Jerry McPherson – background vocals (9)

Instrumentation

- Larry Beaird – acoustic guitar (1)
- Bryan Sutton – acoustic guitar (6, 8, 9)
- Ilya Toshinsky – acoustic guitar (2–4, 7, 10, 11)
- Kelly Back – electric guitar (4, 11)
- Tom Bukovac – electric guitar (1, 5, 6, 8, 9)
- J. T. Corenflos – electric guitar (2, 3, 7, 10)
- Troy Lancaster – electric guitar (2, 3, 7, 10)
- Mike Brignardello – bass guitar (2–4, 7, 10, 11)
- Glenn Worf – bass guitar (6, 8, 9)
- Jimmie Lee Sloas – bass guitar (1, 5)
- Dan Dugmore – steel guitar (2, 3, 7, 10)
- Paul Franklin – steel guitar (8, 9)
- Russ Pahl – steel guitar (4, 11)
- Rob Hajacos – fiddle (2, 10)
- Steve Nathan – Hammond B-3 (1), piano (1, 5)
- Jonathan Yudkin – banjo (1), fiddle (6, 8, 9), mandolin (5)
- Michael Rojas – keyboards (4), organ, piano (2, 3, 7, 10, 11)
- Matt Rollings – keyboards (6, 8, 9)
- Tim Akers – keyboards (6, 8, 9)
- Larry Harden – drums (2, 3, 7, 10)
- Chris McHugh – drums (6, 8, 9)
- Brian Pruitt – drums (4, 11)
- Lonnie Wilson – drums (1, 5)
- Jim Hoke – harmonica (6)

Technical

- Marty Williams – mixing (1, 5, 6, 8, 9)
- Luke Wooten – associate producer, mixing (2–4, 7, 10, 11)
- Bart Morris – assistant engineer, additional recording, digital editing (1, 5, 6, 8, 9)
- Kyle Manner – assistant engineer (2–4, 7, 10, 11)
- Leslie Richter – assistant engineer (2–4, 7, 10, 11)
- Mike "Frog" Griffith – production coordination (1, 5, 6, 8, 9)
- Donna Winklmann – production coordination (2–4, 7, 10, 11)
- Leon Zervos – mastering (Sterling Sound)

Imagery

- Sherri Halford, Ashley Heron, Glenn Sweitzer – art direction
- Glenn Sweitzer/Fresh Design – package design
- Margaret Malandrucculo – photography
- Melody Malloy – wardrobe
- Crystal Tesinksy – grooming
