= 2010 AMP Energy Juice 500 =

Race details
- Race 33 of 36 in the 2010 NASCAR Sprint Cup Series
- Date: October 31, 2010
- Location: Talladega Superspeedway, Talladega, Alabama
- Course: Permanent racing facility
- Course length: 2.66 miles (4.28 km)
- Distance: 188 laps, 500.08 mi (804.8 km)
- Weather: Mostly sunny with a high around 78 °F (26 °C); wind out of the SW at 9 mph.
- Average speed: 163.618 miles per hour (263.318 km/h)

Pole position
Driver	Juan Pablo Montoya	Earnhardt Ganassi Racing
- Time: 51.863

Most laps led
Driver	Dale Earnhardt Jr.	Hendrick Motorsports
- Laps: 24

Winner
No. 33	Clint Bowyer	Richard Childress Racing

Television in the United States
- Network: ESPN
- Announcers: Marty Reid, Dale Jarrett and Andy Petree
- Nielsen ratings: 3.6 (Final); 3.1 (Overnight); (5.177 million)

The 2010 AMP Energy Juice 500 was a NASCAR Sprint Cup Series stock car race that was held on October 31, 2010, at Talladega Superspeedway in Talladega, Alabama. Contested over 188 laps, it was the thirty-third race during the 2010 NASCAR Sprint Cup Series season, and the seventh race in the season-ending Chase for the Sprint Cup. The race was won by Clint Bowyer for the Richard Childress Racing team. Bowyer's teammate, Kevin Harvick, finished in second, while Juan Pablo Montoya clinched third.

Pole position driver Montoya fell to third during the first lap, as Joe Nemechek, who started in the fourth position on the grid, moved to first. Afterward, Harvick became the leader of the race. Some of the Chase for the Sprint Cup participants, such as, Jeff Gordon stayed in the rear almost all race, but with about twenty laps remaining, he and his teammate Jimmie Johnson moved to first and second. Dale Earnhardt Jr. led the most laps (24) despite being involved in an accident on lap 134. After the final caution, Bowyer led on the restart, but Harvick passed him with one lap remaining. While Harvick and Bowyer were side by side in the first turn, the sixth caution ended the race, which resulted in Bowyer winning over Harvick. Bowyer was able to edge Harvick for his second Chase win, with his other being at New Hampshire.

There were six cautions and eighty-five lead changes among twenty-six different drivers throughout the course of the race. It was Bowyer's second win of the 2010 season, with the other being in the Sylvania 300. The result kept him twelfth in the Drivers' Championship, 367 points behind Jimmie Johnson in first. Chevrolet maintained its lead in the Manufacturers' Championship, forty-five ahead of Toyota and ninety-three ahead of Ford, with three races remaining in the season. A total of 110,000 people attended the race, while 5.177 million watched it on television.

== Report ==
=== Background ===
Talladega Superspeedway, the track where the race was held.

Talladega Superspeedway is one of six superspeedways to hold NASCAR races; the others are Daytona International Speedway, Auto Club Speedway, Indianapolis Motor Speedway, Pocono Raceway and Michigan International Speedway. The standard track at the speedway is a four-turn superspeedway that is 2.66 miles (4.28 km) long. The track's turns are banked at thirty-three degrees, while the front stretch, the location of the finish line, is banked at 16.5 degrees. The back stretch has a two-degree banking. Talladega Superspeedway can seat up to 143,231 people.

Before the race, Jimmie Johnson led the Drivers' Championship with 5,998 points, and Denny Hamlin stood in second with 5,992 points. Kevin Harvick followed in third with 5,936 points, 110 ahead of Kyle Busch and 141 ahead of Jeff Gordon in fourth and fifth. Carl Edwards with 5,785 was 23 points ahead of Tony Stewart, as Jeff Burton with 5,752 points, was 31 ahead of Kurt Busch, and 47 in front of Matt Kenseth. Greg Biffle and Clint Bowyer were 11th and 12th respectively with 5,682 and 5,592 points. In the Manufacturers' Championship, Chevrolet was leading with 236 points, 42 points ahead of their rival Toyota. Ford, with 149 points, was 24 points ahead of Dodge in the battle for third. Jamie McMurray was the race's defending champion.

=== Practice and qualifying ===
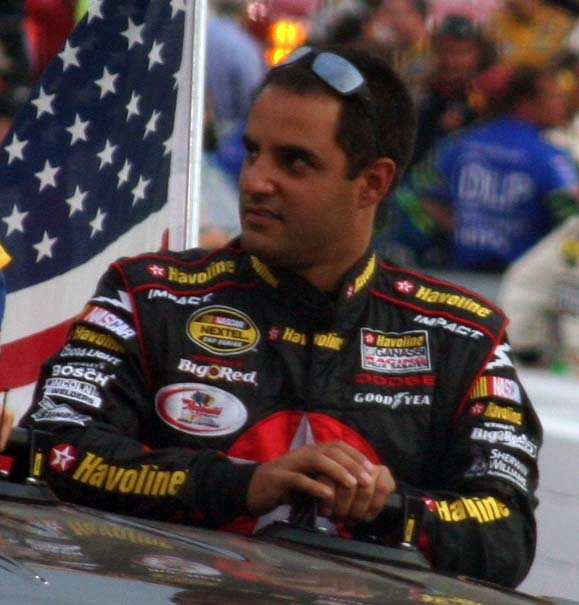
Juan Pablo Montoya (pictured in 2007) scored his fifth Sprint Cup Series career pole position, with a lap time of 51.863 seconds.

Two practice sessions were held on Saturday before the race. The first session lasted 45 minutes, while the second session lasted 60 minutes. During the first practice session, Hamlin, for the Joe Gibbs Racing team, was quickest ahead of Kyle Busch in second and McMurray in third. Jeff Gordon was scored fourth, and Johnson managed fifth. Marcos Ambrose, Kasey Kahne, Aric Almirola, Mark Martin, and Dale Earnhardt Jr. rounded out the top ten quickest drivers in the session. Afterward, during the second and final practice session, Martin was quickest with a lap time of 48.409. Burton and Kyle Busch followed behind Martin, both with a time of 48.414 seconds. Hamlin managed to be fourth fastest, ahead of David Reutimann and Earnhardt. Kenseth was scored seventh, Stewart took eighth, David Ragan was ninth, and Robby Gordon was tenth.

During qualifying, forty-six cars were entered; due to NASCAR's qualifying procedure, which at the time limited each race to forty-three drivers, only that many were able to race. Juan Pablo Montoya clinched his fifth pole position in the Sprint Cup Series, with a time of 51.863. He was joined on the front row of the grid by Bowyer. Kurt Busch qualified third, Joe Nemechek took fourth, and Burton started fifth. The three drivers that failed to qualify for the race were Johnny Sauter, Travis Kvapil, and Landon Cassill. Once qualifying concluded, Montoya stated, "We always run pretty good at restrictor-plate tracks and we’re looking for a good day tomorrow. We’ll run up front a little bit and see what happens. We’ll play it by ear if we decide to go to the back for a while. It’s nice to have these cars and everyone doing the job they are doing here on this team."

=== Race ===
The race, the thirty-third out of a total of thirty-six in the season, began at 1:00 p.m. EDT and was televised live in the United States on ESPN. Prior to the race, weather conditions were dry with the air temperature around 64 °F (18 °C). Randy Norris, from Alabama Raceway Ministries, began the pre-race ceremonies by giving the invocation. Average Joe's Entertainment recording artist Josh Gracin then performed the national anthem, and the AMP Energy grand marshal winners gave the command for drivers to start their engines.

At the start, Montoya was first ahead of Bowyer. Nemechek and Bowyer both passed Montoya before the first lap was over, with the former leading the first lap. On the following lap, Nemechek dropped to the back of the grid, as Harvick edged Earnhardt for the lead. Earnhardt became the leader on the third lap, while Bowyer was scored second on the lower line of cars. The lead then changed for the next three laps, with Montoya taking Bowyer for the lead at first; the first Red Bull Racing car of Kahne passed Montoya on the following lap before he was passed by Earnhardt on the sixth lap. Afterward, Burton became the leader, after using the draft for assistance. On the eighth lap, Burton's teammate Bowyer claimed the lead. With the draft, Brad Keselowski became the leader, before he was passed by Sam Hornish Jr. during the tenth lap. Hornish held the lead until lap 12, when Michael Waltrip passed him for the lead, though Hornish would return to the head of the grid two laps after.

During the 15th lap, Kenseth became the leader. On the following lap, Kenseth and Burton had separated themselves by 1.8 seconds. Afterward, Burton moved into the first position on lap 17. He kept the lead until lap 20, when Kenseth reclaimed the lead, as Stewart made an unexpected pit stop. Two laps later, Kenseth was passed by Burton for the lead, but he would return to the first position on lap 25. After being almost two seconds ahead of third place, the rest of the grid was catching first and second, as Burton became the leader three laps later. Keselowski became the leader on lap 29, while the first and second group of cars on the track was separated by six seconds. Keselowski led one lap before Waltrip became the leader, but he returned to lead during the 32nd lap. Keselowski held the lead until lap 36, when Bowyer passed him. On lap 37 Keselowski and Earnhardt made pit stops, two laps earlier than Johnson and Nemechek. There were three lead changes over the next three laps; Harvick, Martin Truex Jr. and Reutimann all took turns leading the race.

Reutimann led until lap 48 before Martin passed him and led a lap until Hamlin passed him with assistance from Hornish. He led only two laps before Martin reclaimed the lead, but Hamlin would pass him on the 52nd lap. On the following lap, Earnhardt passed Hamlin for the first position. He held the lead until lap 62 when McMurray passed him and became the leader. One lap later, Harvick claimed the lead, after having assistance from Reutimann. After one lap, Harvick and Reutimann had gained two seconds on the rest of the grid, but after leading two laps, Kyle Busch passed him and lead one lap. Afterward, Kurt Busch moved ahead to become the leader. Harvick assisted Reutimann to the lead on lap 68. On the following lap, the first caution was given, after Allmendinger temporarily lost control of his car, causing him to spin out. All but four of the front runners made pit stops during the caution, with most teams changing two or four tires. Following the pit stops, Kenseth moved to first, ahead of Harvick, Biffle, Paul Menard, and Hamlin.

At the lap 73 restart, Kenseth was the leader; however, Kyle Busch would pass him for the lead one lap later. Busch led one lap before Reutimann passed him and led two laps before Busch reclaimed the first position. Kahne then took the lead on lap 79; meanwhile, Hamlin fell further back as he lost the draft of the lead pack. The lead then changed for the next five laps, with Earnhardt taking Kahne for the lead at first; Montoya passed Earnhardt on the following lap before he was passed by Truex, who led only one lap before Hornish edged him to lead lap 84. Afterward, Montoya reclaimed the lead, after drafting with his teammate, McMurray. On lap 86, Chad McCumbee drove to pit road, as Montoya continued to lead. Burton used the draft to move Earnhardt past Montoya for the head of the grid six laps later. On lap 99, Hamlin was scored a lap down after Earnhardt passed him.

Earnhardt led four laps before Reutimann took over the lead position and led two laps. Afterward, Harvick reclaimed the lead position but was passed a lap later when Montoya moved to the lead on lap 106. Two laps later, Kenseth moved to first and led one lap, before Harvick passed him. Afterward, there were three lead changes in the next three laps, beginning with Harvick's teammate Bowyer, followed by Montoya and Earnhardt. Two laps earlier, pit stops began. On the 114th lap, Bowyer became the leader. On the following lap, he made a pit stop, giving the lead to Reutimann, who led one lap before giving the lead to Aric Almirola. After leading two laps, he was passed by Elliott Sadler, who led only one lap, before conceding the first position to Marcos Ambrose on lap 120. One lap later, Menard passed Ambrose for the lead position.

Menard led three laps before McMurray reclaimed the lead and led one lap. Afterward, Burton and his teammate Bowyer swapped the lead a few times. Two laps later, Bowyer was the leader, though on the next lap he was passed by Montoya. After leading two laps, Montoya was passed by his teammate McMurray, who led one lap before Montoya reclaimed the head of the grid. On lap 134, Burton and Earnhardt collided, sending them to collide into the wall, prompting the second caution to be given. Both drove to the garage for repairs, but Burton said that his car was too severely damaged to return to the race. During the caution there were two leaders: Johnson, who led one lap, and Montoya, who reclaimed the lead after Johnson made a pit stop. At the lap 138 restart, Montoya was scored first, ahead of Reutimann and Menard. One lap later, Joey Logano moved to first and led one lap, before Reutimann claimed the lead.

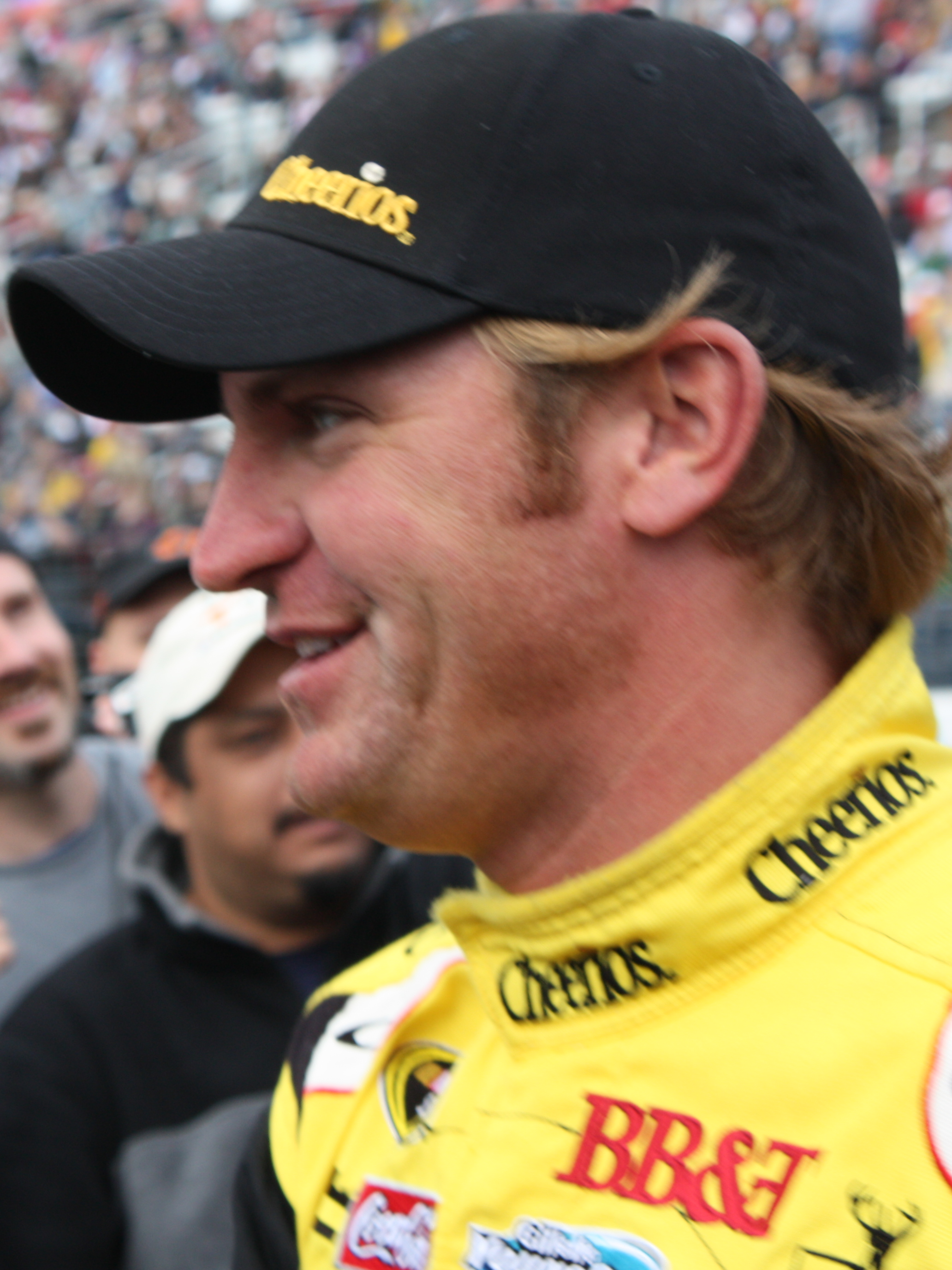
Clint Bowyer won the race after a close battle with his teammate Kevin Harvick.

Reutimann led one lap before the third caution was given because Bowyer collided into Ambrose's rear bumper, which sent Ambrose down the track where Harvick collided with him. On the same lap, Hornish had claimed the lead. During the caution, all the front runners made pit stops. On lap 144, Hornish was given a drive-through penalty for excessive speed on pit road, causing him to give Logano the first position. At the lap 145 restart, Logano was scored first, while Kurt Busch was second and Menard was third. Logano led five laps before Truex, with assistance from Montoya, took over the first position. On lap 152, the fourth caution was given because of debris on the track. Most of the front runners did not pit during the caution. Truex led on the restart, but after leading one lap, was passed by Montoya.

Montoya led two laps before he was passed by Hamlin, who led one lap before his teammate Kyle Busch passed him. On lap 164, McMurray drove to pit road, as Busch and Hamlin remained in the first two positions. Kyle Busch led sixteen laps before Menard became the leader and led a lap, until Jeff Gordon claimed the first position. Afterward, Johnson became the leader, as Gordon suffered engine problems. With nine laps remaining, Bowyer passed Johnson for the head of the grid, as Gordon continued to lose positions. Two laps later, the fifth caution was given because of debris in the third and fourth turns, which came from Nemechek's car. At the lap 184 restart, Bowyer led, as Johnson lost positions. On lap 187, Harvick claimed the lead, as the sixth caution was given for a multi-car incident in which Allmendinger turned on his roof and collided with the wall. When the caution ended the race, Bowyer and Harvick appeared to be side by side, but Bowyer was announced the winner, while Harvick took second ahead of Montoya, Reutimann, and Logano in third, fourth, and fifth. Truex finished sixth, Johnson claimed seventh, and Jeff Gordon was scored eighth. Hamlin and Keselowski rounded out the top ten positions.

=== Post-race ===
"I didn’t know when the caution came out but I thought we beat him to the line – it was really close. I have to thank David Reutimann for pushing me all day. It was a great day for RCR and a great day in the points. I attached myself to the back bumper of the 56 (Martin Truex Jr.) and was able to get a good run there. We came here to lead some laps and win the race. We came up one short of that but did what we needed to do."

— Kevin Harvick, speaking after finishing second in the race.

Bowyer appeared in victory lane after his victory lap to start celebrating his second win of the season, and his first Sprint Cup Series win at Talladega Superspeedway. He also earned $226,450 in race winnings. "Kevin coming on the outside and Juan (Montoya) pushing me got me to the lead. I turned (Marcos Ambrose) around and got into my teammate (Harvick) and I was sick about that but here he came at the end of the race," said Bowyer of his triumph. He also stated, "I thought we had it for sure. When two cars hook up, they just drive off from them and they [Harvick and Reutimann] were coming on the outside and ran us down, and then I quit dragging my brakes and we kind of took off again. Door to door there and all of a sudden ... [spotter Mike] Dillon is yelling at me in my ear that the caution was coming out. I looked over to make sure I was ahead of him. I thought I was, but I didn't know." Harvick was happy for his teammate after the race, saying, "About 6 inches ... It's just one of those deals where we've won a few by a few inches and we've lost a few. It's hard to complain because you can wind up on the wrecker pretty easy. Happy we kept the trophy at RCR. If you're going to lose to somebody, it's good to lose to your teammates and keep the trophy and the money in the right house." Johnson, who finished seventh, was optimistic as he left the race leading the point standings: "It's going to be an awesome championship battle all the way to Homestead, and I'm really looking forward to it."

The race result left Johnson still leading the Drivers' Championship with 6,149 points. Hamlin, who finished ninth, maintained second at 6,135, twenty-four points ahead of Harvick and 193 ahead of Jeff Gordon. In the Manufacturers' Championship, Chevrolet maintained their lead with 245 points. Toyota remained second with 200 points. Ford followed with 152 points, 23 points ahead of Dodge in fourth. 5.177 million people watched the race on television.

Three days following the race, Michael McDowell and his team, Whitney Motorsports, were given a penalty. Whitney Motorsports' penalty included a $50,000 fine to Thomas Tucker (McDowell's crew chief) and an indefinite suspension of Tucker, and both Dusty Whitney and McDowell lost 50 owner and driver points respectively. The team's car chief, Richard Boga, and team manager Tony Furr were also given indefinite suspensions. Whitney Motorsports was penalized because of unapproved added weight location and unapproved added weight, which was caused by the lower A-frames being filled with weight pellets.

== Results ==
=== Qualifying ===
Grid	No.	Driver	Team	Manufacturer	Time	Speed
1	42	Juan Pablo Montoya	Earnhardt Ganassi Racing	Chevrolet	51.863	184.640
2	33	Clint Bowyer	Richard Childress Racing	Chevrolet	51.903	184.498
3	2	Kurt Busch	Penske Racing	Dodge	51.934	184.388
4	87	Joe Nemechek	NEMCO Motorsports	Toyota	51.972	184.253
5	31	Jeff Burton	Richard Childress Racing	Chevrolet	51.998	184.161
6	88	Dale Earnhardt Jr.	Hendrick Motorsports	Chevrolet	52.070	183.906
7	36	Dave Blaney	Tommy Baldwin Racing	Chevrolet	52.076	183.885
8	39	Ryan Newman	Stewart–Haas Racing	Chevrolet	52.111	183.762
9	13	Casey Mears	Germain Racing	Toyota	52.151	183.621
10	77	Sam Hornish Jr.	Penske Racing	Dodge	52.153	183.614
11	12	Brad Keselowski	Penske Racing	Dodge	52.168	183.561
12	1	Jamie McMurray	Earnhardt Ganassi Racing	Chevrolet	52.173	183.543
13	97	Jeff Fuller	NEMCO Motorsports	Toyota	52.212	183.406
14	29	Kevin Harvick	Richard Childress Racing	Chevrolet	52.221	183.374
15	46	Michael McDowell	Whitney Motorsports	Chevrolet	52.250	183.273
16	83	Kasey Kahne	Red Bull Racing Team	Toyota	52.258	183.245
17	11	Denny Hamlin	Joe Gibbs Racing	Toyota	52.313	183.052
18	56	Martin Truex Jr.	Michael Waltrip Racing	Toyota	52.325	183.010
19	48	Jimmie Johnson	Hendrick Motorsports	Chevrolet	52.328	182.999
20	55	Michael Waltrip	Prism Motorsports	Toyota	52.351	182.919
21	00	David Reutimann	Michael Waltrip Racing	Toyota	52.367	182.863
22	71	Chad McCumbee	TRG Motorsports	Chevrolet	52.374	182.839
23	99	Carl Edwards	Roush Fenway Racing	Ford	52.379	182.821
24	09	Bobby Labonte	Phoenix Racing	Chevrolet	52.385	182.800
25	20	Joey Logano	Joe Gibbs Racing	Toyota	52.388	182.790
26	14	Tony Stewart	Stewart–Haas Racing	Chevrolet	52.389	182.786
27	17	Matt Kenseth	Roush Fenway Racing	Ford	52.389	182.786
28	6	David Ragan	Roush Fenway Racing	Ford	52.428	182.650
29	82	Scott Speed	Red Bull Racing Team	Toyota	52.443	182.598
30	5	Mark Martin	Hendrick Motorsports	Chevrolet	52.465	182.522
31	24	Jeff Gordon	Hendrick Motorsports	Chevrolet	52.500	182.400
32	18	Kyle Busch	Joe Gibbs Racing	Toyota	52.510	182.365
33	19	Elliott Sadler	Richard Petty Motorsports	Ford	52.527	182.306
34	16	Greg Biffle	Roush Fenway Racing	Ford	52.541	182.258
35	47	Marcos Ambrose	JTG Daugherty Racing	Toyota	52.616	181.998
36	43	A. J. Allmendinger	Richard Petty Motorsports	Ford	52.650	181.880
37	9	Aric Almirola	Richard Petty Motorsports	Ford	52.710	181.673
38	98	Paul Menard	Richard Petty Motorsports	Ford	52.716	181.653
39	78	Regan Smith	Furniture Row Racing	Chevrolet	52.799	181.367
40	37	David Gilliland	Front Row Motorsports	Ford	53.328	179.568
41	34	Robert Richardson Jr.	Front Row Motorsports	Ford	53.490	179.024
42	7	Robby Gordon	Robby Gordon Motorsports	Toyota	53.642	178.517
43	26	Bill Elliott	Latitude 43 Motorsports	Ford	53.023	180.601
Failed to qualify
44	64	Landon Cassill	Gunselman Motorsports	Toyota	52.727	181.615
45	38	Travis Kvapil	Front Row Motorsports	Ford	53.064	180.461
46	66	Johnny Sauter	Prism Motorsports	Toyota	54.066	177.117

=== Race results ===
Pos	Grid	No.	Driver	Team	Manufacturer	Laps	Points
1	2	33	Clint Bowyer	Richard Childress Racing	Chevrolet	188	190^{1}
2	14	29	Kevin Harvick	Richard Childress Racing	Chevrolet	188	175^{1}
3	1	42	Juan Pablo Montoya	Earnhardt Ganassi Racing	Chevrolet	188	170^{1}
4	21	00	David Reutimann	Michael Waltrip Racing	Toyota	188	165^{1}
5	25	20	Joey Logano	Joe Gibbs Racing	Toyota	188	160^{1}
6	18	56	Martin Truex Jr.	Michael Waltrip Racing	Toyota	188	155^{1}
7	19	48	Jimmie Johnson	Hendrick Motorsports	Chevrolet	188	151^{1}
8	31	24	Jeff Gordon	Hendrick Motorsports	Chevrolet	188	147^{1}
9	17	11	Denny Hamlin	Joe Gibbs Racing	Toyota	188	143^{1}
10	11	12	Brad Keselowski	Penske Racing	Dodge	188	139^{1}
11	30	5	Mark Martin	Hendrick Motorsports	Chevrolet	188	135^{1}
12	39	78	Regan Smith	Furniture Row Racing	Chevrolet	188	127
13	38	98	Paul Menard	Richard Petty Motorsports	Ford	188	129^{1}
14	33	19	Elliott Sadler	Richard Petty Motorsports	Ford	188	126^{1}
15	10	77	Sam Hornish Jr.	Penske Racing	Dodge	188	123^{1}
16	27	17	Matt Kenseth	Roush Fenway Racing	Ford	188	120^{1}
17	23	99	Carl Edwards	Roush Fenway Racing	Ford	188	117^{1}
18	42	7	Robby Gordon	Robby Gordon Motorsports	Toyota	188	109
19	34	16	Greg Biffle	Roush Fenway Racing	Ford	188	106
20	37	9	Aric Almirola	Richard Petty Motorsports	Ford	188	108^{1}
21	28	6	David Ragan	Roush Fenway Racing	Ford	188	100
22	22	71	Chad McCumbee	TRG Motorsports	Chevrolet	188	97
23	8	39	Ryan Newman	Stewart–Haas Racing	Chevrolet	188	94
24	9	13	Casey Mears	Germain Racing	Toyota	188	91
25	32	18	Kyle Busch	Joe Gibbs Racing	Toyota	188	93^{1}
26	16	83	Kasey Kahne	Red Bull Racing Team	Toyota	188	90^{1}
27	4	87	Joe Nemechek	NEMCO Motorsports	Toyota	188	87^{1}
28	20	55	Michael Waltrip	Prism Motorsports	Toyota	188	84^{1}
29	29	82	Scott Speed	Red Bull Racing Team	Toyota	188	76
30	3	2	Kurt Busch	Penske Racing	Dodge	188	78^{1}
31	26	14	Tony Stewart	Stewart–Haas Racing	Chevrolet	188	70
32	36	43	A. J. Allmendinger	Richard Petty Motorsports	Ford	187	67
33	40	37	David Gilliland	Front Row Motorsports	Ford	187	64
34	35	47	Marcos Ambrose	JTG Daugherty Racing	Toyota	187	66^{1}
35	15	46	Michael McDowell	Whitney Motorsports	Chevrolet	186	58
36	12	1	Jamie McMurray	Earnhardt Ganassi Racing	Chevrolet	183	60^{1}
37	41	34	Robert Richardson Jr.	Front Row Motorsports	Ford	180	52
38	24	09	Bobby Labonte	Phoenix Racing	Chevrolet	172	49
39	6	88	Dale Earnhardt Jr.	Hendrick Motorsports	Chevrolet	163	56^{2}
40	43	26	Bill Elliott	Latitude 43 Motorsports	Ford	140	43
41	5	31	Jeff Burton	Richard Childress Racing	Chevrolet	133	45^{1}
42	7	36	Dave Blaney	Tommy Baldwin Racing	Chevrolet	12	37
43	13	97	Jeff Fuller	NEMCO Motorsports	Toyota	2	34
^{1} Includes five bonus points for leading a lap
^{2} Includes ten bonus points for leading the most laps

== Standings after the race ==
Drivers' Championship standings
Rank	Driver	Points
1	Jimmie Johnson	6,149
2	Denny Hamlin	6,135
3	Kevin Harvick	6,111
4	Jeff Gordon	5,942
5	Kyle Busch	5,919
6	Carl Edwards	5,902
7	Tony Stewart	5,832
8	Matt Kenseth	5,825
9	Kurt Busch	5,799
10	Jeff Burton	5,797
11	Greg Biffle	5,788
12	Clint Bowyer	5,782

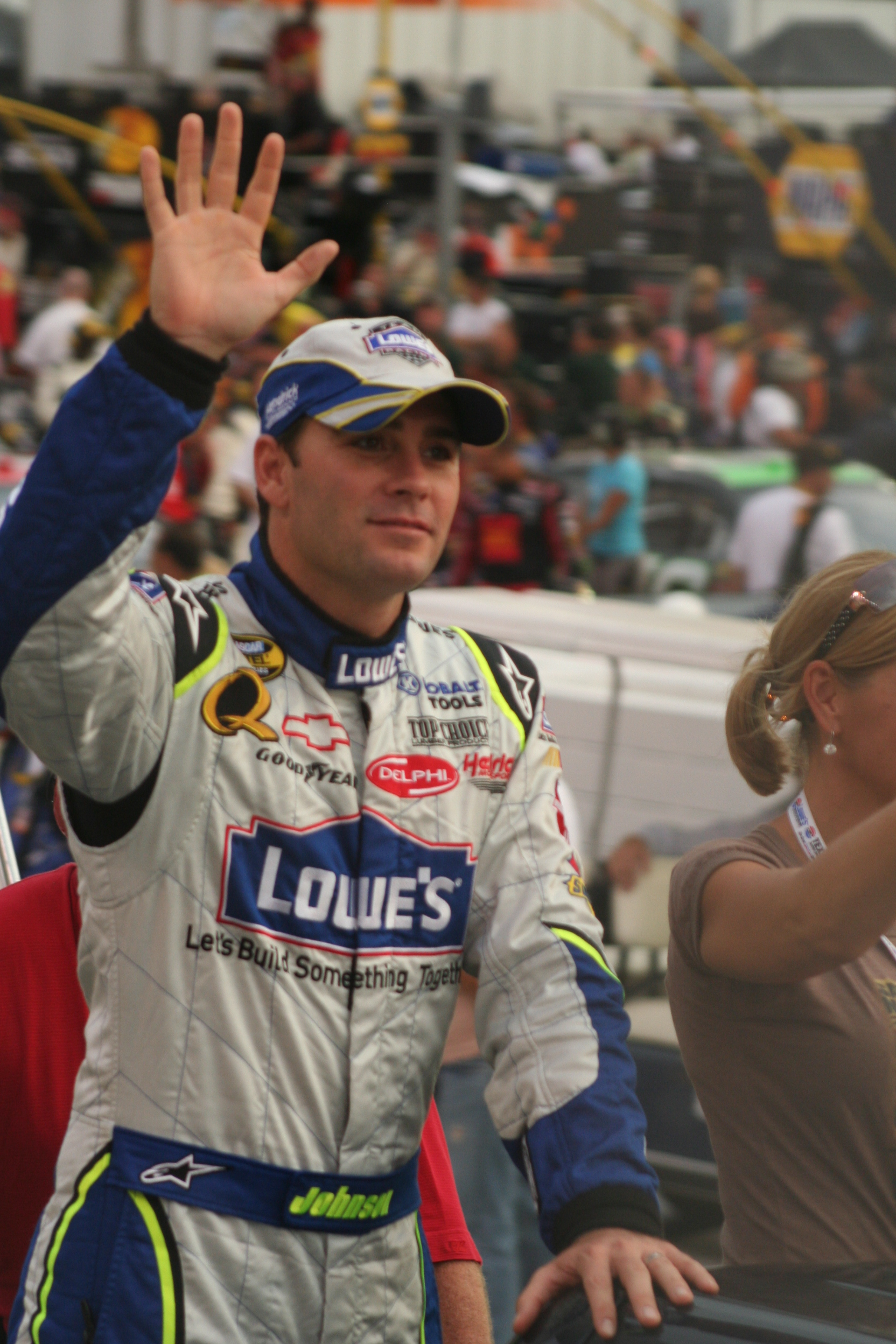
Jimmie Johnson (pictured in 2007) remained the points leader, after finishing seventh in the race.

Manufacturers' Championship standings
Rank	Manufacturer	Points
1	Chevrolet	245
2	Toyota	200
3	Ford	152
4	Dodge	129

- Note: Only the top twelve positions are included for the driver standings. These drivers qualified for the Chase for the Sprint Cup.

Previous race: 2010 TUMS Fast Relief 500	Sprint Cup Series; 2010 season	Next race: 2010 AAA Texas 500
