= You, Me and the Windshield =

Album by Marcel

Studio album by Marcel
- Released: May 13, 2003
- Genre: Country
- Length: 48:32
- Label: Mercury Nashville
- Producers: Byron Gallimore; Marcel

Marcel chronology
You, Me and the Windshield (2003)	Believin (2009)

You, Me and the Windshield is the debut album of American country music singer Marcel. It was the only album he released for Mercury Nashville.

== Content ==
The album includes the single "Country Rock Star", which peaked at number 46 on the Hot Country Songs charts. The album itself peaked at number 48 on Top Country Albums. "Nothin' to Lose" was later recorded by Josh Gracin on his self-titled debut album; his version was released as a single and peaked at number 1 on the same chart in 2005.

== Critical reception ==
Jeffrey B. Remz of Country Standard Time gave a mostly-favorable review. His review praised Marcel's singing and the lyrics, saying that "Marcel also deserves credit for co-writing all 13 songs. No filler, all meat on them lyrically and musically, and he shows a sense of humor as well." although he was critical of the "bright and loud" production. Matt Bjorke of About.com gave a favorable review, saying that it was "diverse and different than what is currently played on country radio."

== Track listing ==
1. "Country Rock Star" (Marcel, Kevin Savigar) — 3:39
2. "Tennessee" (Marcel, James T. Slater) — 4:16
3. "Annie Devine" (Marcel, Slater, Kent Blazy) — 4:10
4. "Missing You" (Marcel, Craig Wiseman) — 3:22
5. "The Working Day" (Marcel, Savigar) — 3:55
6. "I Won't Hold You Down" (Marcel, Slater) — 4:11
  - duet with Jessica Andrews
7. "Take It" (Marcel, Tim Mathews) — 3:36
8. "Nothin' to Lose" (Marcel, Savigar) — 3:27
9. "You, Me and the Windshield" (Marcel, Billy Decker) — 3:02
10. "Shadow" (Marcel, Kevin Fisher, Fred Wilhelm) — 3:21
11. "Holding On to Letting Go" (Marcel, Slater) — 4:20
12. "Perfect Situation" (Marcel, Bobby Terry) — 3:15
13. "This Old Diesel" (Marcel, Matt Rollings, Kevin Greenberg) — 3:49

== Personnel ==
Compiled from liner notes.

Musicians

- Bekka Bramlett — tambourine on "Annie Devine", background vocals
- Mike Brignardello — bass guitar
- Pat Buchanan — electric guitar
- Mark Casstevens — banjo
- Stuart Duncan — fiddle, mandolin
- Paul Franklin — steel guitar
- Byron Gallimore — background vocals
- Kenny Greenberg — electric guitar
- Aubrey Haynie — fiddle, mandolin
- Jim Hoke — harmonica
- B. James Lowry — acoustic guitar
- Frank J. Macek — drum loops
- Marcel — vocals, harmonica
- Brent Mason — electric guitar
- Chris McHugh — drums
- Steve Nathan — keyboards
- Russ Pahl — steel guitar
- Travis Parker — fiddle
- Michael Rhodes — bass guitar
- Matt Rollings — keyboards
- James T. Slater — background vocals
- Russell Terrell — background vocals
- Tony "T-Bone" Wahrman — voice at the beginning of "Country Rock Star"
- Biff Watson — acoustic guitar
- Lonnie Wilson — drums
- Glenn Worf — bass guitar
- Jonathan Yudkin — cello on "I Won't Hold You Down"

Technical

- Jeff Balding — mixing (tracks 4, 7, 10, 11, 12)
- Byron Gallimore — production; mixing (tracks 6, 13)
- Julian King — recording
- Marcel — production
- Doug Sax — mastering
- Mike Shipley — mixing (tracks 1, 2, 3, 5, 8, 9)

== Chart performance ==
Chart (2003)	Peak position
US Top Country Albums (Billboard)	48
