= We Weren't Crazy (song) =

Single by Josh Gracin

from the album We Weren't Crazy
- Released: October 29, 2007
- Genre: Country
- Length: 3:47
- Label: Lyric Street
- Songwriters: Josh Gracin; Tony Lopacinski; Bobby Pinson
- Producer: Brett James

Josh Gracin singles chronology
"I Keep Coming Back" (2007)	"We Weren't Crazy" (2007)	"Unbelievable (Ann Marie)" (2008)

Music video
- "We Weren't Crazy" at CMT.com

"We Weren't Crazy" is a song co-written and recorded by American country music artist Josh Gracin. It was released in October 2007 as the third single and title track from his album We Weren't Crazy. The song, which Gracin wrote with Bobby Pinson and Tony Lopacinski, is Gracin's fourth top ten hit on the Billboard Hot Country Songs charts, with a peak of number ten, as well as his first top ten since "Stay With Me (Brass Bed)", which peaked at number five on October 22, 2005.

== Content ==
"We Weren't Crazy" is a moderate up-tempo in which the narrator describes his adult years: starting with a move to California with his lover, then raising children and having a family of his own. In the chorus, he states that he and she, though they may have been "living for the moment", "loving blind [and] borderline reckless", they "weren't crazy" for starting their family the way they did.

== Critical reception ==
Jim Malec from The 9513 gave the song a thumbs-up rating. Although he said that the lyrics weren't "brilliant or groundbreaking", he added that Gracin's voice and "infectious chorus" made it a song that "does what it does well". Thom Jurek of AllMusic cited the song as a standout on his review of the album as well.

== Music video ==
The music video shows clips from Josh Gracin's life, and was directed by Stephen Shepherd.

== Chart performance ==
The song debuted at number 51 on the Hot Country Songs chart dated November 3, 2007, and entered the Top 40 on the chart week of January 12, 2008. The song reached a peak of number ten in August 2008 after 40 weeks on the charts, one of the longest climbs to reach the top ten.

Chart (2007–2008)	Peak position
US Hot Country Songs (Billboard)	10
US Billboard Hot 100	82
US Billboard Pop 100	78

=== End of year charts ===
Chart (2008)	Peak position
U.S. Billboard Hot Country Songs Year End Chart	46
