= Telluride (Tim McGraw song) =

2001 song by Tim McGraw

Song by Tim McGraw

from the album Set This Circus Down
- Released: April 24, 2001
- Genre: Country
- Length: 3:48
- Label: Curb
- Songwriters: Brett James; Troy Verges
- Producers: Byron Gallimore, James Stroud, Tim McGraw

"Telluride" is a song originally recorded by Tim McGraw on his 2001 album Set This Circus Down. The song was written by Brett James and Troy Verges. McGraw's version, though never a single, charted twice on Billboard Hot Country Songs from unsolicited airplay. It reached number 52 on its first entry, and then re-entered at number 59 in 2002.

== Chart performance ==
| Chart (2001) | Peak position |
|---|---|
| US Hot Country Songs (Billboard) | 52 |
| Chart (2002) | Peak position |
| US Hot Country Songs (Billboard) | 59 |

== Josh Gracin version ==
"Telluride"

Single by Josh Gracin

from the album We Weren't Crazy
- Released: December 27, 2008
- Genre: Country
- Length: 3:53
- Label: Lyric Street
- Songwriters: Brett James; Troy Verges
- Producer: Brett James

Josh Gracin singles chronology
| "Unbelievable (Ann Marie)" (2008) | "Telluride" (2008) | "Enough" (2009) |

It was later recorded by American country music artist Josh Gracin. It was released in December 2008 as the fifth single from the album We Weren't Crazy. The song peaked at number 34 on the Billboard Hot Country Songs chart.

=== Chart performance ===
| Chart (2008–2009) | Peak position |
|---|---|
| US Hot Country Songs (Billboard) | 34 |
