= 2010 TUMS Fast Relief 500 =

Race details
- Race 32 of 36 in the 2010 NASCAR Sprint Cup Series
- The 2010 TUMS Fast Relief 500 program cover, featuring Kyle Busch and Denny Hamlin.
- Date: October 24, 2010
- Location: Martinsville Speedway, Martinsville, Virginia
- Course: Permanent racing facility
- Course length: 0.526 miles (0.847 km)
- Distance: 500 laps, 263 mi (423 km)
- Weather: Partly cloudy with a high around 75; wind out of the WSW at 9 mph.
- Average speed: 71.619 miles per hour (115.260 km/h)

Pole position
Driver	Denny Hamlin	Joe Gibbs Racing
- Time: 19.518

Most laps led
Driver	Jeff Burton	Richard Childress Racing
- Laps: 134

Winner
No. 11	Denny Hamlin	Joe Gibbs Racing

Television in the United States
- Network: ESPN
- Announcers: Marty Reid, Dale Jarrett and Andy Petree

The 2010 TUMS Fast Relief 500 was a NASCAR Sprint Cup Series race that was held on October 24, 2010, at Martinsville Speedway in Ridgeway, Virginia. It was contested over 500 laps, and was the thirty-second race of the season and the sixth race in the season-ending Chase for the Sprint Cup for the 2010 NASCAR Sprint Cup Series. The race was won by Denny Hamlin for the Joe Gibbs Racing team. Mark Martin driving for Hendrick Motorsports finished second and Richard Childress Racing's Kevin Harvick, who started thirty-sixth, came third.

The race logo for the TUMS Fast Relief 500.

During the race there were fifteen cautions and twenty-four lead changes among thirteen drivers. It was Hamlin's seventh win in the 2010 season and the fifteenth of his career. The result left him second in the Drivers' Championship, six points behind Jimmie Johnson. Chevrolet maintained its lead in the Manufacturers' Championship, forty-two ahead of Toyota and eighty-seven ahead of Ford, with four races remaining in the season.

== Report ==
=== Background ===
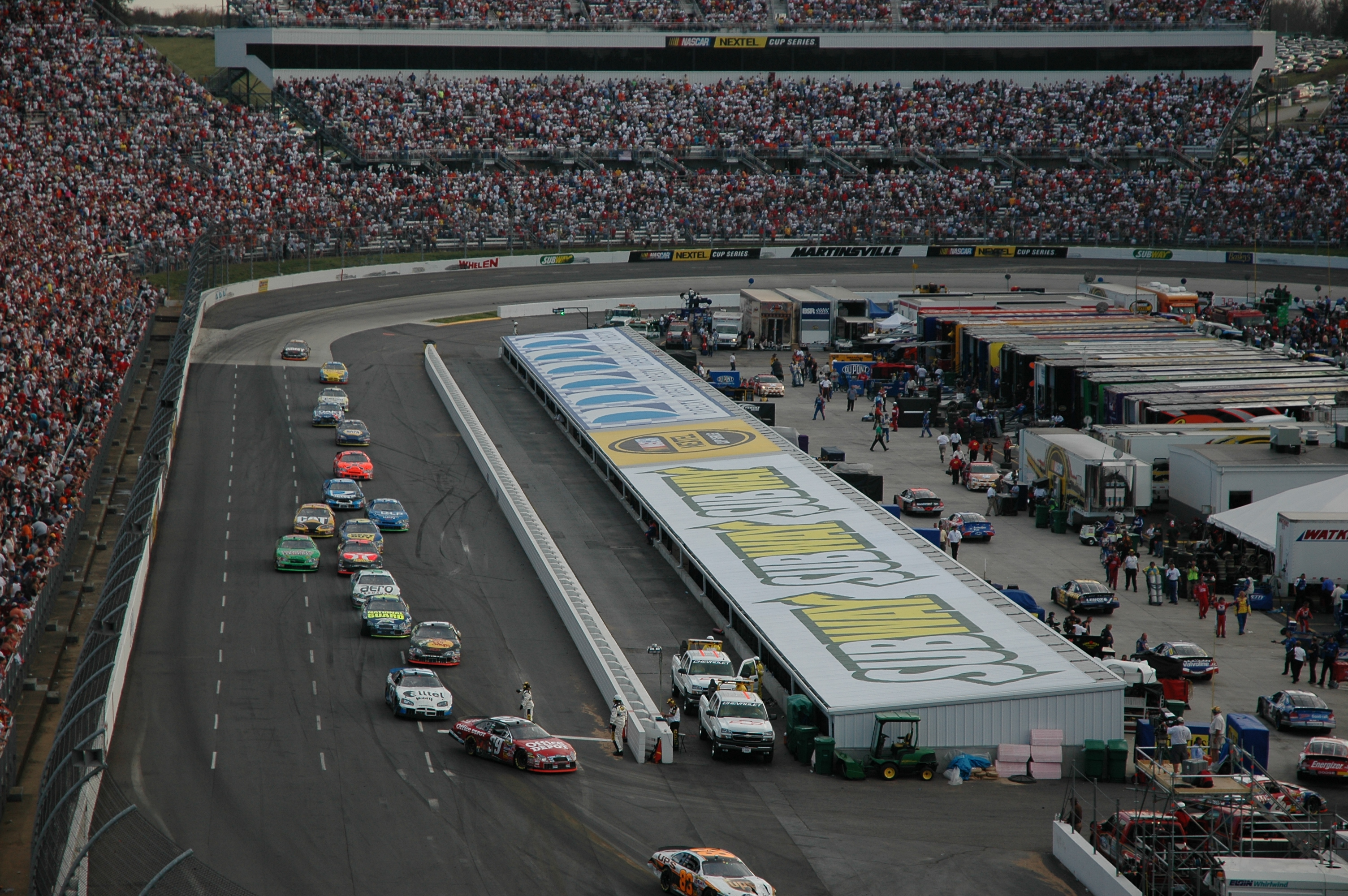
Martinsville Speedway, the race track where the race was held.

Martinsville Speedway is one of five short tracks that holds NASCAR races. The standard track at Martinsville Speedway is a 0.526 miles (0.847 km) long, four-turn, short oval track. The track's turns are banked at eleven degrees while the front stretch, the location of the finish line, is banked at zero degrees. The back stretch also has zero-degree banking. The racetrack can accommodate 63,000 spectators.

Before the race, Jimmie Johnson led the Drivers' Championship with 5,843 points whereas Denny Hamlin stood in second place with 5,802 points. Third-placed Kevin Harvick had 5,766 points, seventy-nine ahead of the fourth-placed Jeff Gordon and hundred ahead of the fifth-placed Kyle Busch. Tony Stewart in sixth with 5,666 points, was twenty-three points ahead of Carl Edwards and Greg Biffle with 5,618 points was twelve ahead of Kurt Busch, and fourteen in front of Jeff Burton. Matt Kenseth and Clint Bowyer were eleventh and twelfth places with 5,587 and 5,543 points, respectively . In the Manufacturers' Championship, Chevrolet led with 230 points, forty-five points ahead of their rival Toyota. Ford, with 145 points, was twenty-three points ahead of Dodge in the battle for third place. Hamlin was the race's defending champion after winning it in 2009.

=== Practice and qualifying ===
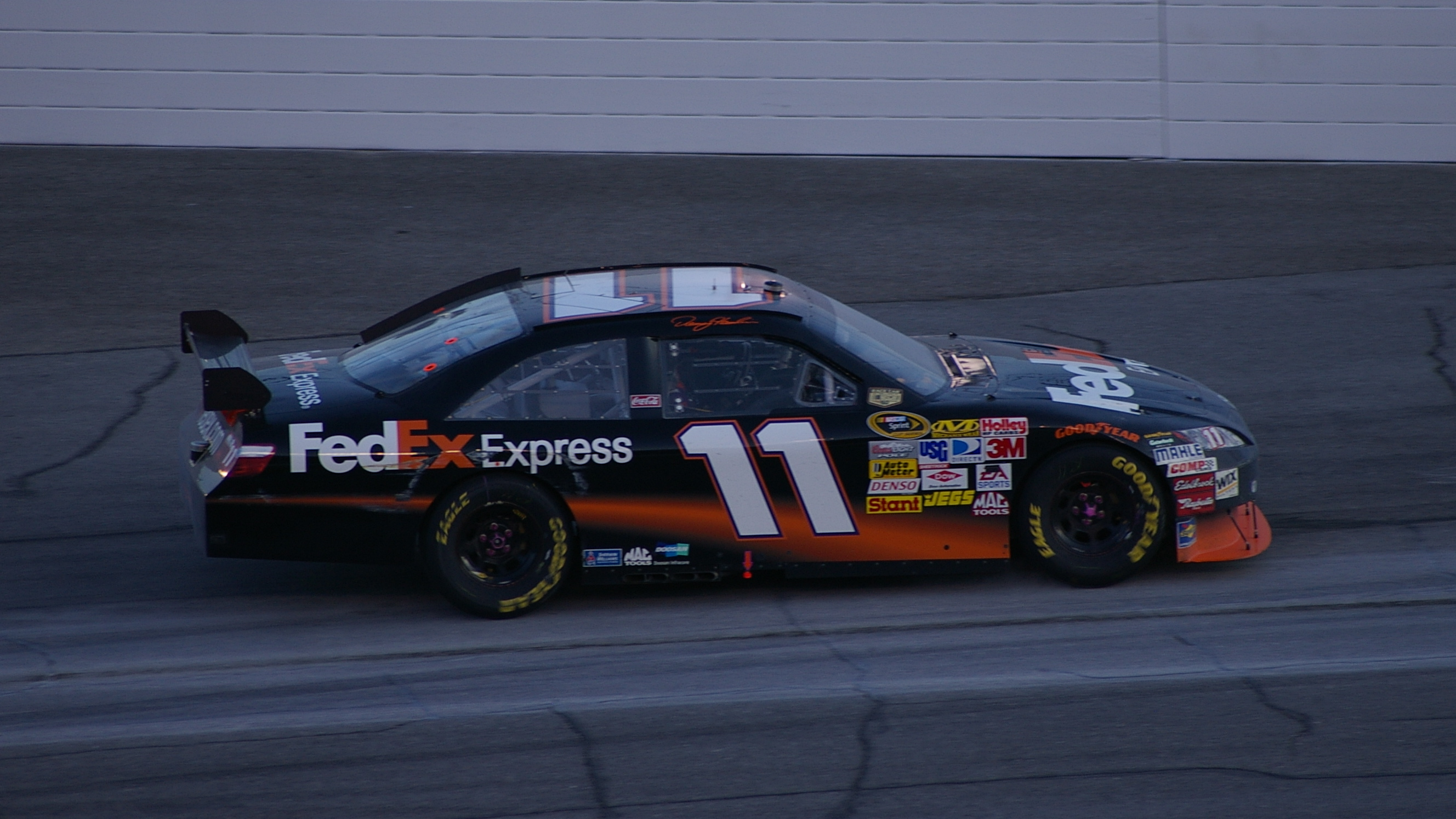
Denny Hamlin won the pole position, after having the fastest time of 19.518 seconds.

Three practice sessions were held before the Saturday race—one on Friday and two on Saturday. The first session lasted ninety minutes, the second session lasted forty-five minutes, while the third and final session lasted sixty minutes. During the first practice session, Stewart, who was racing for the Stewart–Haas Racing team, was the quickest ahead of Hamlin in the second position and Juan Pablo Montoya in the third position. Biffle came in fourth and David Reutimann finished fifth. Bowyer, David Ragan, A. J. Allmendinger, Gordon, and Joey Logano in that order rounded out the ten drivers who were quickest in the session.

After the practice sessions during qualification, forty-eight cars were entered but only forty-three was able to race because of NASCAR's qualifying procedure. Hamlin clinched the ninth pole position of his career with a time of 19.518 seconds. He was joined on the front row of the grid by Marcos Ambrose. Biffle qualified third, Ryan Newman took fourth, and Montoya started fifth. Johnson, one of the drivers in the Chase for the Sprint Cup, qualified nineteenth while Harvick was scored thirty-sixth. Michael McDowell, Johnny Sauter, Robby Gordon, and Terry Cook failed to qualify for the race while Dennis Setzer withdrew from qualifying. Once the qualifying session was completed, Hamlin commented:

We spent all day working on qualifying trying to get the pole—trying to get that first pit stall because obviously we do feel like it's very important. I think if I’m ahead of the 48 then I could possibly set the tone in whether he leads a lap or not. That's a 10-point swing. That's a little bit of it. It all starts today and that's where our strategy's at. Other than that, I plan on trying to go out there and lead the most laps and win the race—just like everyone else is.

The next morning, Brad Keselowski was the quickest in the second practice session, ahead of Bowyer in the second place and Harvick in the third place. Allmendinger was the fourth quickest, and Ambrose finished fifth. Burton, Jamie McMurray, Bobby Labonte, Ragan, and Johnson followed in the top ten in that order. Carl Edwards was twenty-sixth and Kyle Busch was twenty-seventh. During the third and final practice session, Biffle was the quickest with the fastest time of 19.799 seconds. Burton and Bowyer followed in second and third places with times of 19.866 and 19.867 seconds respectively. McMurray was the fourth fastest driver ahead of Harvick, who finished fifth, and Johnson, who finished sixth. Gordon finished seventh, Hamlin took eighth, Aric Almirola was ninth, and Mark Martin was tenth.

=== Race ===
The race, the thirty-second of thirty-six in the season, began at 1:00 p.m. Eastern Daylight Time (EDT) and was televised live in the United States on ESPN. Prior to the race, weather conditions were sunny with an air temperature of around 65 °F (18 °C). During the race, the temperature was forecast to peak at 76 °F (24 °C). Eddie Barton of Raceway Ministries began the pre-race ceremonies with an invocation. Next, Winston-Salem State University's Marching Band performed the national anthem and each of the race teams' pit crews gave the command for drivers to start their engines. Before the pace laps, Robby Gordon replaced Kevin Conway in the 7 car.

Denny Hamlin accelerated from the start line more quickly than Marcos Ambrose, getting ahead of him down the front straightaway. After starting fifth, Juan Pablo Montoya had fallen to seventh by lap 5. Montoya continued to lose positions and had fallen to 11th as Jeff Gordon took over the eighth position from Carl Edwards. On lap 11, Ambrose became the leader after passing Hamlin. Two laps later, Hamlin had fallen to fourth after being passed by Biffle and Newman, while Tony Stewart fell to eighth position. By lap 21, Ambrose had a 0.9 second lead over the second position. After starting thirty-sixth, Kevin Harvick had moved to twenty-seventh by lap 23. Hamlin continued to lose positions, dropping back to eleventh in less than thirteen laps. Landon Cassill drove to the garage because of problems with his car's brakes on lap 28. Four laps later, Jimmie Johnson took over thirteenth after passing Scott Speed. Seven laps later, Harvick had moved up to the 20th position. On lap 46, David Gilliland took his car to the garage. On the next lap Travis Kvapil's tire blew and he crashed into the wall and brought out the first caution of the race. Tony Raines won the free pass under caution. The leading cars made a pit stop during the caution.

Casey Mears stayed out and assumed the lead of the race. He made a pit stop on the next lap and handed the lead to Ryan Newman, who won the race off pit road. Jamie McMurray and David Ragan were caught for speeding on pit road and restarted at the back of the field. Newman led the field to the green on the lap 53 restart. By lap 60, Harvick had moved into the eighth position. Three laps later, Jeff Burton passed Biffle for fourth. On the next lap Hamlin passed Stewart for the tenth position. Three laps later, Burton continued to move up the field by passing Ambrose for the third position. On lap 77, Dave Blaney took his car to the garage because of problems with its brakes. Two laps later, Burton passed David Reutimann for the second position. Three laps later, he passed Ryan Newman for the lead of the race. Eight laps later, Reutimann passed Newman for the second position. On lap 104, Hamlin passed Harvick for the fifth position. Hamlin continued to move up the field by passing Ambrose for the fourth position, six laps later. On the next lap, the second caution of the race came out for Elliott Sadler, who spun out in turn two. He was also held for two laps for intentionally causing the caution. Robby Gordon won the free pass under caution.

Most of the cars made a pit stop to change tires and refuel. Brad Keselowski was caught speeding on the pit road and restarted at the back of the field. Burton, who retained the lead throughout the cycle of pit stops, led the field to the green flag on the lap 116 restart. Two laps later, Johnson passed Ambrose for the ninth position. On the next lap, the third caution of the race came out for Ambrose, who blew out a tire and hit a wall after making contact with Johnson. Kurt Busch and Martin Truex Jr. made pit stops under caution as did Ambrose, who stayed on the lead lap despite making multiple pit stops. Burton led the field to the green flag on the lap 126 restart. Newman passed Burton for the lead on the next lap. Burton retook the lead on the next lap and started to pull away. Four laps later, the fourth caution came out for Ken Schrader, who spun on the backstretch after being tapped by Casey Mears, who won the free pass under the caution. Several cars made pit stops while the first fourteen cars elected to stay out. The green flag waved for the restart on lap 137 with Jeff Burton in the lead.

On the next lap, Harvick passed Reutimann for the third position. Seven laps later, Harvick passed Newman for second as Jeff Gordon moved past Biffle for the eighth position. On lap 151, Clint Bowyer passed Biffle for the tenth position. Two laps later, Truex Jr. made an unscheduled pit stop that put him multiple laps down. On lap 170, the fifth caution of the race came out for Truex, who stopped at the entrance of the pit road. Tony Raines won the free pass for the third time under this caution. Most cars made pit stops under the caution to refuel and get fresh tires. Tony Stewart was caught speeding on the pit road and restarted at the back of the field while Greg Biffle had to make two pit stops to replace a lug nut that was missing from his car. Burton won the race off the pit road and led the field back to the green flag on lap 176. By lap 181, Newman had fallen to the sixth position as Reutimann and Johnson passed him. Four laps later, the sixth caution came out for Regan Smith, who spun out and hit the wall. Ken Schrader won the free pass under the caution. Most of the cars opted to stay out while McMurray, Stewart, Scott Speed, Sam Hornish Jr., and Mears made pit stops under caution. Burton continued to lead as he led the field to the green flag on the lap 200 restart. Hamlin moved past Harvick for the second position on the next lap. Two laps later, the seventh caution came out for Bowyer, who spun and hit the wall in Turn 4. Hermie Sadler won the free pass under the caution. Biffle, Ambrose, Hornish, and Robby Gordon made pit stops as most of the cars opted to stay out. Burton restarted in the lead on lap 200. Three laps later, Dale Earnhardt Jr. passed Newman for the sixth position. On lap 205, Harvick re-passed Denny Hamlin for the second position. Four laps later, the eighth caution of the race came out for Paul Menard, who spun after he was bumped by Aric Almirola. Hermie Sadler again received the free pass and went back onto the lead lap. Several drivers including Earnhardt Jr. and Carl Edwards made pit stops under caution. Greg Biffle received a penalty for having too many men over the wall and restarted at the back of the field.

Burton led the field to the green flag on the lap 214 restart but on the next lap he was passed by his teammate Harvick. Burton retook the lead from Harvick seven laps later. On lap 224, Stewart passed Kurt Busch for the tenth position. On the next lap, the ninth caution came out for Mark Martin, who crashed into the wall on the front stretch after being bumped by A. J. Allmendinger. J. J. Yeley received the free pass under caution. The leaders made pit stops under the caution while thirteen cars stayed out. Jeff Gordon led the field to the green flag on lap 232. On the next lap, the tenth caution was brought out by Reutimann, who spun and hit the wall after making contact with Brad Keselowski. Scott Speed received the free pass under this caution. Gordon led the field to the green flag on lap 246. Two laps later, Mark Martin made a pit stop to replace a flat tire and went two laps down. On lap 250, Newman took his car to the garage because he lost his rear gear. Six laps later, Stewart claimed the fourth position by passing Montoya. On lap 258, Earnhardt Jr. passed Kyle Busch for the fourth position. Two laps later, Burton and Johnson passed David Ragan for tenth and eleventh places, respectively. On lap 271, Joe Nemechek took his car, which had a problem with its brakes, top the garage. Two laps later, Burton had moved up to the fifth position. On lap 285, Earnhardt Jr. passed Gordon for the lead. Two laps later, the eleventh caution of the race came out for Yeley, who had stopped on the backstretch because his car had a brake problem. Most of the leading cars made a pit stop during the caution period. Robby Gordon stayed out to lead a lap. He pitted two laps later and handed the lead to Earnhardt Jr., who led the field to the green flag on lap 293. Four laps later, Jeff Gordon passed Stewart for the second position as Burton passed Kyle Busch for the fourth position.

On lap 305, Ambrose got loose, spun, and hit Sam Hornish Jr., sending both cars into the outside wall. The caution did not come out because both of them safely returned to the pit road. On the same lap, Robby Gordon had a flat tire and made a pit stop. By lap 312, Burton had moved up to the third position. Five laps later, he passed Jeff Gordon on the backstretch for the second position. On lap 331, Hamlin passed Johnson for the eighth position. Two laps later, Kyle Busch passed Stewart for the fourth position. On lap 348, the twelfth caution came out for Biffle, who spun out with a flat tire. The leading cars made a pit stop to refuel and replace their tires. Earnhardt Jr. led the field to the green flag for the restart on lap 356. Two laps later, the thirteenth caution came out for Sam Hornish Jr., who spun and hit the wall. Earnhardt Jr. continued to lead as he led the field to the green flag on lap 363. Five laps later, Harvick passed Burton for the second position. On lap 373, Hamlin passed Edwards for the seventh position. Five laps later, Harvick passed Earnhardt Jr. for the lead in turn 1. By lap 382, Earnhardt Jr. had fallen to the fourth position because he had been passed by Burton and Johnson. Two laps later, the fourteenth caution came out for Jeff Gordon, who had bumped Kurt Busch, who retaliated by spinning Gordon out on the front stretch on the next lap.

Mark Martin won the free pass under caution and got back onto the lead lap. Ken Schrader stayed out and assumed the lead as the lead cars made a pit stop. He led the field to the green flag on lap 393 but Harvick on fresh tires quickly passed him on the next lap. The fifteenth and final caution of the race came out on lap 396 when Tony Raines had a flat tire and spun in turn four. Jeff Gordon got the free pass under caution and got back on the lead lap. Gordon, Allmendinger and Hornish made pit stops under caution as Kevin Harvick led the field to the green flag on the lap 402 restart. On the next lap, Burton passed Hamlin for the second position. On lap 422, Mark Martin passed Kurt Busch for the twelfth position. Two laps later, he passed Montoya for 11th. By lap 437 Martin had moved up to the ninth position. Four laps later, he passed Edwards for the eighth position. On lap 456, Hamlin re-passed Burton for the second position. Eight laps later, Martin passed Earnhardt Jr. for the seventh position. On lap 472, Hamlin took the lead by passing Harvick. By lap 481, Martin had moved up to the fourth position, passing Kyle Busch. Five laps later, he passed Burton for the third position. On lap 492, Ambrose had a flat tire but made it safely to the pit road. With four laps remaining, Martin passed Harvick for the second position as Hamlin had built a two-second advantage over the second place that he retained to the end and won his third consecutive race at Martinsville, and his seventh of the season.

== Results ==
=== Qualifying ===
Grid	No.	Driver	Team	Manufacturer	Time	Speed
1	11	Denny Hamlin	Joe Gibbs Racing	Toyota	19.518	97.018
2	47	Marcos Ambrose	JTG Daugherty Racing	Toyota	19.521	97.003
3	16	Greg Biffle	Roush Fenway Racing	Ford	19.524	96.988
4	39	Ryan Newman	Stewart–Haas Racing	Chevrolet	19.527	96.973
5	42	Juan Pablo Montoya	Earnhardt Ganassi Racing	Chevrolet	19.530	96.959
6	14	Tony Stewart	Stewart–Haas Racing	Chevrolet	19.544	96.889
7	99	Carl Edwards	Roush Fenway Racing	Ford	19.555	96.835
8	00	David Reutimann	Michael Waltrip Racing	Toyota	19.557	96.825
9	1	Jamie McMurray	Earnhardt Ganassi Racing	Chevrolet	19.583	96.696
10	6	David Ragan	Roush Fenway Racing	Ford	19.585	96.686
11	24	Jeff Gordon	Hendrick Motorsports	Chevrolet	19.589	96.666
12	98	Paul Menard	Richard Petty Motorsports	Ford	19.591	96.657
13	78	Regan Smith	Furniture Row Racing	Chevrolet	19.598	96.622
14	82	Scott Speed	Red Bull Racing Team	Toyota	19.601	96.607
15	43	A. J. Allmendinger	Richard Petty Motorsports	Ford	19.606	96.583
16	56	Martin Truex Jr.	Michael Waltrip Racing	Toyota	19.627	96.479
17	33	Clint Bowyer	Richard Childress Racing	Chevrolet	19.631	96.460
18	31	Jeff Burton	Richard Childress Racing	Chevrolet	19.650	96.366
19	48	Jimmie Johnson	Hendrick Motorsports	Chevrolet	19.653	96.352
20	13	Casey Mears	Germain Racing	Toyota	19.655	96.342
21	5	Mark Martin	Hendrick Motorsports	Chevrolet	19.675	96.244
22	20	Joey Logano	Joe Gibbs Racing	Toyota	19.678	96.229
23	09	Bobby Labonte	Phoenix Racing	Chevrolet	19.686	96.190
24	77	Sam Hornish Jr.	Penske Racing	Dodge	19.691	96.166
25	12	Brad Keselowski	Penske Racing	Dodge	19.697	96.136
26	18	Kyle Busch	Joe Gibbs Racing	Toyota	19.698	96.132
27	38	Travis Kvapil	Front Row Motorsports	Ford	19.703	96.107
28	88	Dale Earnhardt Jr.	Hendrick Motorsports	Chevrolet	19.720	96.024
29	2	Kurt Busch	Penske Racing	Dodge	19.748	95.888
30	64	Landon Cassill	Gunselman Motorsports	Toyota	19.748	95.888
31	19	Elliott Sadler	Richard Petty Motorsports	Ford	19.754	95.859
32	17	Matt Kenseth	Roush Fenway Racing	Ford	19.773	95.767
33	83	Kasey Kahne	Red Bull Racing Team	Toyota	19.790	95.685
34	36	Dave Blaney	Tommy Baldwin Racing	Chevrolet	19.792	95.675
35	9	Aric Almirola	Richard Petty Motorsports	Ford	19.799	95.641
36	29	Kevin Harvick	Richard Childress Racing	Chevrolet	19.824	95.521
37	87	Joe Nemechek	NEMCO Motorsports	Toyota	19.889	95.208
38	26	Ken Schrader	Latitude 43 Motorsports	Ford	19.912	95.098
39	37	David Gilliland	Front Row Motorsports	Ford	19.979	94.780
40	34	Tony Raines	Front Row Motorsports	Ford	20.125	94.092
41	7	Kevin Conway	Robby Gordon Motorsports	Toyota	20.173	93.868
42	71	Hermie Sadler	TRG Motorsports	Chevrolet	20.194	93.770
43	81	J. J. Yeley	Whitney Motorsports	Dodge	19.963	94.855
Failed to Qualify
44	46	Michael McDowell	Whitney Motorsports	Chevrolet	20.044	94.472
45	07	Robby Gordon	Robby Gordon Motorsports	Toyota	20.072	94.340
46	55	Terry Cook	Prism Motorsports	Toyota	20.118	94.125
47	66	Johnny Sauter	Prism Motorsports	Toyota	No time	

=== Race results ===
Pos	No.	Driver	Team	Manufacturer	Laps	Points
1	11	Denny Hamlin	Joe Gibbs Racing	Toyota	500	190
2	5	Mark Martin	Hendrick Motorsports	Chevrolet	500	170
3	29	Kevin Harvick	Richard Childress Racing	Chevrolet	500	170
4	18	Kyle Busch	Joe Gibbs Racing	Toyota	500	160
5	48	Jimmie Johnson	Hendrick Motorsports	Chevrolet	500	155
6	20	Joey Logano	Joe Gibbs Racing	Toyota	500	150
7	88	Dale Earnhardt Jr.	Hendrick Motorsports	Chevrolet	500	151
8	99	Carl Edwards	Roush Fenway Racing	Ford	500	142
9	31	Jeff Burton	Richard Childress Racing	Chevrolet	500	148
10	12	Brad Keselowski	Penske Racing	Dodge	500	134
11	1	Jamie McMurray	Earnhardt Ganassi Racing	Chevrolet	500	130
12	43	A. J. Allmendinger	Richard Petty Motorsports	Ford	500	127
13	98	Paul Menard	Richard Petty Motorsports	Ford	500	124
14	83	Kasey Kahne	Red Bull Racing Team	Toyota	500	121
15	17	Matt Kenseth	Roush Fenway Racing	Ford	500	118
16	2	Kurt Busch	Penske Racing	Dodge	499	115
17	6	David Ragan	Roush Fenway Racing	Ford	499	112
18	26	Ken Schrader	Latitude 43 Motorsports	Ford	499	114
19	42	Juan Pablo Montoya	Earnhardt Ganassi Racing	Chevrolet	499	106
20	24	Jeff Gordon	Hendrick Motorsports	Chevrolet	498	108
21	9	Aric Almirola	Richard Petty Motorsports	Ford	498	100
22	7	Robby Gordon	Robby Gordon Motorsports	Toyota	498	102
23	82	Scott Speed	Red Bull Racing Team	Toyota	498	94
24	14	Tony Stewart	Stewart–Haas Racing	Chevrolet	498	96
25	77	Sam Hornish Jr.	Penske Racing	Dodge	496	88
26	71	Hermie Sadler	TRG Motorsports	Chevrolet	496	85
27	00	David Reutimann	Michael Waltrip Racing	Toyota	494	82
28	19	Elliott Sadler	Richard Petty Motorsports	Ford	474	79
29	56	Martin Truex Jr.	Michael Waltrip Racing	Toyota	473	76
30	39	Ryan Newman	Stewart–Haas Racing	Chevrolet	455	73
31	78	Regan Smith	Furniture Row Racing	Chevrolet	442	70
32	34	Tony Raines	Front Row Motorsports	Ford	437	67
33	16	Greg Biffle	Roush Fenway Racing	Ford	432	64
34	47	Marcos Ambrose	JTG Daugherty Racing	Toyota	428	66
35	38	Travis Kvapil	Front Row Motorsports	Ford	423	58
36	36	Dave Blaney	Tommy Baldwin Racing	Chevrolet	418	55
37	37	David Gilliland	Front Row Motorsports	Ford	382	52
38	33	Clint Bowyer	Richard Childress Racing	Chevrolet	359	49
39	81	J. J. Yeley	Whitney Motorsports	Dodge	282	46
40	13	Casey Mears	Germain Racing	Toyota	271	48
41	87	Joe Nemechek	NEMCO Motorsports	Toyota	264	40
42	64	Landon Cassill	Gunselman Motorsports	Toyota	200	37
43	09	Bobby Labonte	Phoenix Racing	Chevrolet	197	34

== Standings after the race ==
Drivers' Championship standings
Rank	Driver	Points
1	Jimmie Johnson	5,998
2	Denny Hamlin	5,992
3	Kevin Harvick	5,936
4	Kyle Busch	5,826
5	Jeff Gordon	5,795
6	Carl Edwards	5,785
7	Tony Stewart	5,762
8	Jeff Burton	5,752
9	Kurt Busch	5,721
10	Matt Kenseth	5,705
11	Greg Biffle	5,682
12	Clint Bowyer	5,592

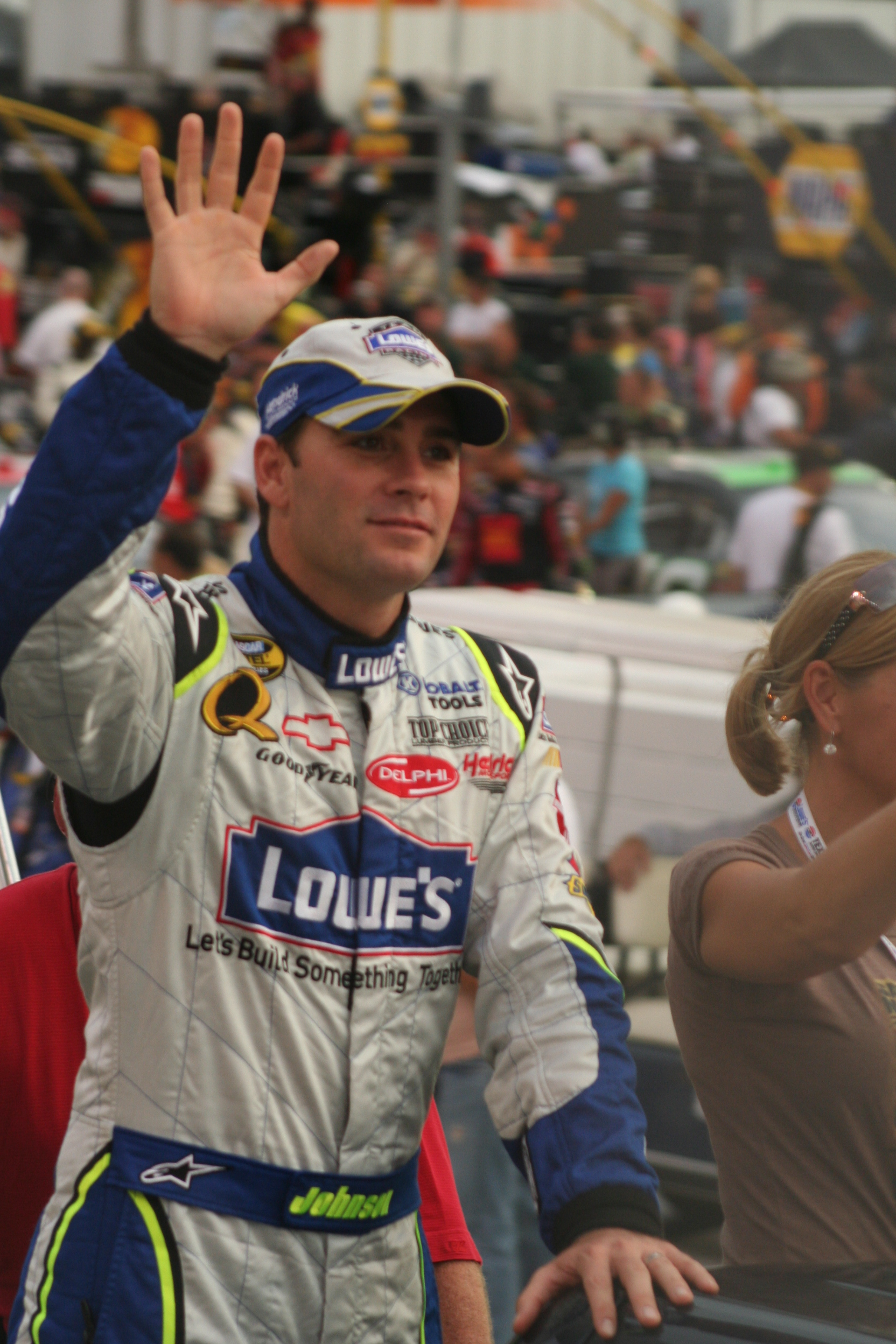
Jimmie Johnson remained the points leader, after finishing fifth in the race.

Manufacturers' Championship standings
Rank	Manufacturer	Points
1	Chevrolet	236
2	Toyota	194
3	Ford	149
4	Dodge	125

- Note: Only the top twelve positions are included for the driver standings. These drivers qualified for the Chase for the Sprint Cup.

Previous race: 2010 Bank of America 500	Sprint Cup Series; 2010 season	Next race: 2010 AMP Energy Juice 500
