= I Keep Coming Back (Josh Gracin song) =

Single by Josh Gracin

from the album We Weren't Crazy
- Released: October 28, 2006
- Genre: Country
- Length: 3:51
- Label: Lyric Street
- Songwriters: Jeffrey Steele, Steve Robson
- Producer: Marty Williams

Josh Gracin singles chronology
"Favorite State of Mind" (2006)	"I Keep Coming Back" (2006)	"We Weren't Crazy" (2007)

"I Keep Coming Back" is a song recorded by American country music artist Josh Gracin. It was released in October 2006 as the second single from the album We Weren't Crazy. The song reached #28 on the Billboard Hot Country Songs chart. The song was written by Jeffrey Steele and Steve Robson.

== Chart performance ==
Chart (2006–2007)	Peak position
US Hot Country Songs (Billboard)	28
