= I Want to Live (Josh Gracin song) =

"I Want To Live"

Single by Josh Gracin

from the album Josh Gracin
- Released: March 22, 2004
- Genre: Country
- Length: 3:52 (radio edit); 3:58 (album version)
- Label: Lyric Street
- Songwriters: Brett James; Rivers Rutherford
- Producer: Marty Williams

Josh Gracin singles chronology
"I Want To Live" (2004)	"Nothin' to Lose" (2004)

Music video
- "I Want to Live" on YouTube

"I Want to Live" is a debut song written by Brett James and Rivers Rutherford, and recorded by American country music singer Josh Gracin. It was released in March 2004 as the first single from his debut album Josh Gracin. The song peaked at number 4 on the U.S. Billboard Hot Country Singles & Tracks (now Hot Country Songs) charts in mid-2004. It also peaked on the Billboard Hot 100 at number 57.

== Content ==
A mid-tempo ballad, "I Want to Live" centralizes on a character who, upon realizing that his life has been unsatisfactory, decides that he wants to change — to "take everything that this world has to give".

The song's opening electric guitar riff is based on the Led Zeppelin song "Kashmir". A fiddle-and-drum fadeout was omitted from the radio edit.

== Music video ==
Directed by Brent Hedgecock, the video shows Gracin hanging out with his friends at a karaoke bar when his friends ask him to go up and sing. As he sings, Gracin is placed in areas that come from the backgrounds that are playing behind him as he is singing. The video premiered on CMT in mid-2004.

== Chart performance ==
"I Want to Live" debuted at number 57 on the U.S. Billboard Hot Country Singles & Tracks for the week of March 13, 2004.

Chart (2004)	Peak position
US Billboard Hot 100	45
US Hot Country Songs (Billboard)	4

=== Year-end charts ===
Chart (2004)	Position
US Country Songs (Billboard)	38
