= Redemption (Josh Gracin album) =

Studio album by Josh Gracin
- Released: November 8, 2011
- Recorded: 2009–2011
- Genre: Country
- Length: 70:29
- Label: Average Joe's
- Producers: Josh Gracin; Kevin Murphy; Shauna; Keith Thomas

Josh Gracin chronology
We Weren't Crazy (2008)	Redemption (2011)

Singles from Redemption
- 1. "Cover Girl" Released: August 2010; 2. "Long Way to Go" Released: June 2011

Redemption is the third studio album from American country music artist Josh Gracin. It was released on November 8, 2011.

After Gracin was dropped by his previous record label, Lyric Street Records, in early 2009, Gracin began working independently on his third studio album. During that time, he released a couple of songs to country radio, but they failed to chart. In January 2010, Gracin signed with Average Joe's Entertainment, and his first single under Average Joe's, "Cover Girl," was released in August 2010. It charted briefly on the Billboard Hot Country Songs chart, reaching a peak of number 57. "Long Way to Go" was released as a single to Adult Contemporary radio, and became Gracin's first single to be promoted to the format, and has since reached the Top 20.

== Critical reception ==
Professional ratings
Review scores
Source	Rating
AllMusic	3/5 stars

Thom Jurek of AllMusic was mixed on the record overall, praising tracks like "Long Way to Go" and "Only When It Rains" as highlights and commending the various musicianship from Gracin's road band but felt the track listing needed a few songs cut for length. He concluded that "Ultimately, Gracin is betting a lot on Redemption; each self-penned song reaches for a certain niche in the contemporary country genre, trying to cover all the bases programmers desire [...] whether this kitchen-sink approach results in garnering new ones is indeed a gamble."

== Track listing ==
No.	Title	Writer(s)	Length
1.	"Different Kind of Crazy"	Josh Gracin, Brad Tursi	3:35
2.	"Over Me"	Gracin	4:21
3.	"Get Back to Us"	Gracin	4:25
4.	"Enough"	Gracin	4:16
5.	"I Want to Make You Cry"	Gracin	4:21
6.	"Let You Go"	Gracin, Kevin Murphy, Shaun Balin	5:23
7.	"Edge of Desire"	John Mayer	5:09
8.	"Lie to Me"	Gracin, Loren Ellis	3:09
9.	"Love You Right"	Gracin, Tursi	4:10
10.	"Only When It Rains" (duet with Shelagh Brown)	Gracin	5:26
11.	"My Life"	Gracin, Tursi	3:07
12.	"Cover Girl"	Gracin, Tursi	3:17
13.	"Catastrophe"	Gracin, Ruben Studdard	5:22
14.	"Can't Say Goodbye"	Gracin, Seana Arrechaga	4:05
15.	"I Still Love You"	Gracin, Tursi	3:56
16.	"Long Way to Go"	Gracin	3:13
17.	"Long Way to Go" (remix)	Gracin	3:14

== Personnel ==
- Shelagh Brown- duet vocals on "Only When It Rains"
- Tom Bukovac- acoustic guitar, electric guitar
- Jonathan Crane- acoustic guitar
- Will Doughty- keyboards
- Loren Ellis- acoustic guitar
- Josh Gracin- acoustic guitar, lead vocals, background vocals
- Mark Hill- bass guitar
- Claire Indie- cello
- Shane Kiester- keyboards
- Tony Lucido- bass guitar
- Devin Malone- electric guitar
- Mike Meadows- acoustic guitar
- Kevin Murphy- drums, percussion
- Russ Pahl- doblajes, pedal steel guitar
- Hubert Payne- drums
- Ben Phillips- drums
- Ethan Pilzer- bass guitar
- Holli Poole- background vocals
- Danny Rader- electric guitar
- Rich Redmond- percussion
- Tripper Ryder- bass guitar, background vocals
- Adam Shoenfeld- electric guitar
- Jeff Smith- background vocals
- Keith Thomas- keyboards, programming
- Seth Timbs- keyboards
- Ilya Toshinsky- acoustic guitar
- Travis Toy- banjo, pedal steel guitar
- Jonathan Yudkin- banjo, string arrangements, strings

== Chart performance ==
The album debuted at number 167 in the Top Current Albums chart with sales of 3,000.

=== Album ===
Chart (2011)	Peak position
US Billboard Top Country Albums	39
US Billboard Independent Albums	39

=== Singles ===
Year	Single	Peak chart positions	
Year	Single	US Country	US AC
2009	"Enough"	—	—
2009	"Different Kind of Crazy"	—	—
2010	"Over Me"	—	—
2010	"Cover Girl"	57	—
2011	"Long Way to Go"	—	16
"—" denotes releases that did not chart
