= Favorite State of Mind =

Single by Josh Gracin

from the album We Weren't Crazy
- Released: February 27, 2006
- Genre: Country
- Length: 3:18
- Label: Lyric Street
- Songwriters: Marcel; Blair Daly
- Producer: Marty Williams

Josh Gracin singles chronology
"Stay with Me (Brass Bed)" (2005)	"Favorite State of Mind" (2006)	"I Keep Coming Back" (2006)

"Favorite State of Mind" is a song recorded by American country music artist Josh Gracin. It was released in February 2006 as the first single from his second album, We Weren't Crazy. The song was written by Marcel and Blair Daly.

== Critical reception ==
The song received a favorable review from Chuck Taylor of Billboard, who wrote that it is "a rousing, party-hardy jukebox directive, targeting fans who enjoy an embossed familiarity with classic giddy-up country."

== Music video ==
The music video was directed by Roman White and premiered in April 2006.

== Chart performance ==
The song debuted at number 56 on the U.S. Billboard Hot Country Songs chart for the week of March 11, 2006.

Chart (2006)	Peak position
US Hot Country Songs (Billboard)	19
US Bubbling Under Hot 100 (Billboard)	19
