= Nothin' to Lose (Marcel song) =

Single by Josh Gracin

from the album Josh Gracin
- Released: August 31, 2004
- Genre: Country
- Length: 2:36
- Label: Lyric Street
- Songwriters: Marcel, Kevin Savigar
- Producer: Marty Williams

Josh Gracin singles chronology
"I Want to Live" (2004)	"Nothin' to Lose" (2004)	"Stay with Me (Brass Bed)" (2005)

Music video
- "Nothin' to Lose" on YouTube

"Nothin' to Lose" is a song written by Marcel and Kevin Savigar, and recorded by American country music artist Josh Gracin. It was released in August 2004 as the second single from his self-titled CD. The song is Gracin's only number one hit on the Billboard Hot Country Singles & Tracks chart in 2005. It also peaked at number 39 on the Billboard Hot 100, his only Top 40 hit on that chart.

== Background ==
The song was written by Marcel and Kevin Savigar and was included as a track on Marcel's Mercury Records Nashville debut album, You, Me and the Windshield. It was then given to Gracin to record when his manager searched for songs for Gracin's debut album.

== Content ==
The song is set at a fast pace, with a string of rapidly delivered lyrics, through which the narrator explains that he has "nothin' to lose" now that he has found a lover.

== Music video ==
Directed by Trey Fanjoy, the video is set at a high school, following a male student who holds a note addressed to "Ann Marie", a reference to Gracin's then-wife. The note gets passed to each person that comes in contact with it, making its way to the principal's office, where the student is sitting down at and the titular Ann Marie enters to meet the person who asked for her. The video premiered on CMT in late 2004. It was filmed at Stratford High School in East Nashville.

== Chart performance ==
"Nothin' to Lose" debuted at number 60 on the U.S. Billboard Hot Country Singles & Tracks for the week of September 11, 2004.

Chart (2004–2005)	Peak Position
US Billboard Hot 100	39
US Hot Country Songs (Billboard)	1

=== Year-end charts ===
Chart (2005)	Position
US Country Songs (Billboard)	6
