= Stay with Me (Brass Bed) =

Single by Josh Gracin

from the album Josh Gracin
- Released: April 11, 2005
- Genre: Country
- Length: 4:15 (album version)
- Label: Lyric Street
- Songwriters: Jedd Hughes; Brett James; Terry McBride
- Producer: Marty Williams

Josh Gracin singles chronology
"Nothin' to Lose" (2004)	"Stay with Me (Brass Bed)" (2005)	"Favorite State of Mind" (2006)

Music video
- "Stay with Me (Brass Bed)" at CMT.com

"Stay with Me (Brass Bed)" is a song written by Terry McBride, Brett James and Jedd Hughes, and recorded by American country music singer Josh Gracin. It was released in April 2005 as the third and final single from his self-titled CD. Originally titled just "Brass Bed" on the album, it gained the alternative title upon its release to radio.

== Content ==
A mid-tempo set in triple meter in the key of A-sharp minor, the song is punctuated by mandolin and a string section throughout. Its lyrics focus on the narrator, who is addressing his lover, requesting that she stay with him "on this big brass bed". The radio edit features an abridged intro.

== Music video ==
The music video was directed by Trey Fanjoy and premiered in mid-2005.

== Chart performance ==
"Stay with Me (Brass Bed)" debuted at number 53 on the U.S. Billboard Hot Country Singles & Tracks for the week of April 30, 2005.

Chart (2005)	Peak Position
US Hot Country Songs (Billboard)	5
US Billboard Hot 100	47
US Billboard Pop 100	66

=== Year-end charts ===
Chart (2005)	Position
US Country Songs (Billboard)	30
