= Marcel (singer) =

American singer

- Born: Marcel Francois Chagnon; February 9, 1975 (age 51)
- Origin: Grosse Pointe, Michigan, United States
- Genre: Country
- Occupations: Singer; songwriter; music video director
- Instruments: Vocals; guitar; harmonica
- Years active: 2003-present
- Labels: Mercury Nashville; Lyric Street; Red Stripe Plane
- Spouse: Jessica Andrews (m. 2011)

Marcel Francois Chagnon (born February 9, 1975), known mononymously as Marcel, is an American country music singer, songwriter, and music video director. Signed to Mercury Nashville Records in 2003, he released his debut album You, Me, and the Windshield that year and charted on the Billboard Hot Country Songs charts with the single "Country Rock Star". Five years later, he signed to Lyric Street Records and released the single "I Love This Song", which has also charted. In addition to his recording career, Marcel has directed several music videos, and has written charted singles for Josh Gracin, Trace Adkins, and Jessica Andrews, to whom he is married.

== Career ==
Born in Grosse Pointe, Michigan, Marcel was a semi-pro hockey player until signing with Mercury Nashville Records in 2002. For four years prior to this, while waiting for an opportunity, he sang at clubs, bars, and waited tables for extra money.

In 2003, he released his debut album You, Me and the Windshield. The tracks "Country Rock Star" and "Tennessee" from this album were released as singles. After this he returned to writing songs for other artists.

Marcel has co-written two of Josh Gracin's singles: "Nothin' to Lose", which previously appeared on You, Me and the Windshield, and "Favorite State of Mind". Jessica Andrews also released two of his songs as singles: "There's More to Me Than You" and "Everything". Rascal Flatts, LeAnn Rimes, and Big & Rich have also recorded his songs.

In 2008, Marcel signed to Lyric Street Records, releasing his third single, "I Love This Song" that year. When the song failed to reach Top 40, he exited Lyric Street's roster. In February 2009, he signed to the Red Stripe Plane label. He had a cameo in Hannah Montana: The Movie, playing guitar in Billy Ray Cyrus' band. He is also shown in Cyrus' video for "Back to Tennessee".

On February 17, 2009, Marcel released his fourth single, "Believin'", which is also the title track to his second album. The album was released on the Red Stripe Plane label, but neither the album or single charted on any Billboard chart. In June 2010, Marcel released a new single titled "It's Summertime." Later in the year, Marcel began directing music videos for other artists.

== Personal life ==
Marcel became engaged to Jessica Andrews in October 2010, and the two were married on November 11, 2011. Andrews gave birth to the couple's son on February 6, 2018.

== Discography ==
=== Studio albums ===
Title	Album details	Peak positions
Title	Album details	US Country
You, Me and the Windshield	Release date: May 13, 2003; Label: Mercury Nashville	48
Believin'	Release date: January 28, 2009; Label: Red Stripe Plane	—
"—" denotes releases that did not chart

=== Singles ===
Year	Single	Peak positions	Album
Year	Single	US Country	Album
2002	"Country Rock Star"	46	You, Me and the Windshield
2003	"Tennessee"	—	You, Me and the Windshield
2008	"I Love This Song"	52	—N/a
2009	"Believin'"	—	Believin'
2010	"It's Summertime"	—	—N/a
"—" denotes releases that did not chart

=== Music videos ===
Year	Video	Director
2003	"Tennessee"	Shaun Silva
2008	"I Love This Song"	Chris Hicky
2008	"The Good Life"	Marcel
2009	"Believin'"	Marcel

== Music videos directed ==
32 music videos are currently listed here.

Year	Video	Artist
2008	"The Good Life"	Marcel
2009	"Believin'"	Marcel
2010	"She Won't Be Lonely Long"	Clay Walker
2010	"Love Is Love Is Love"	Anthony Smith
2010	"Last Train to Clarksville"	The Grascals
2010	"You Take Yourself with You"	Bo Bice
2010	"Tell Me You Get Lonely"	Frankie Ballard
2011	"Didn't I"	James Wesley
2011	"Hunt You Down"	JT Hodges
2011	"Old School"	Chuck Wicks
2011	"Lucky Guy"	Mockingbird Sun
2011	"Got My Country On"	Chris Cagle
2011	"I'll Be Home for Christmas"	Craig Campbell
2012	"A-OK"	Neal McCoy
2012	"Somethin' 'bout a Sunday"	Ira Dean
2012	"Sweet Southern Song"	Ali Dee
2012	"Those Jeans"	Ray Scott
2012	"On the Outskirts of Town"	The Time Jumpers
2013	"Salt Life"	Chuck Wicks
2014	"Every Time It Rains"	James House
2014	"Shut Me Up"	Old Dominion
2014	"Roll All Night"	Whitney Duncan
2015	"Clint Eastwood"	Jessie James
2015	"Ray Bans"	JT Hodges
2016	"He Loves Me"	Sarahbeth Taite
2016	"Torn"	Backroad Anthem
2016	"It All Started with a Beer"	Frankie Ballard
2016	"Tall Boy"	CJ Solar
2016	"White Picket Fences"	Shelley Skidmore
2016	"Edge of 18"	Steve Dorian
2016	"After Midnight"	JT Hodges
2017	"Po-Dunk"	Kid Rock
2018	"This is It"	Scotty McCreery
