= Josh Gracin =

American country singer (born 1980)

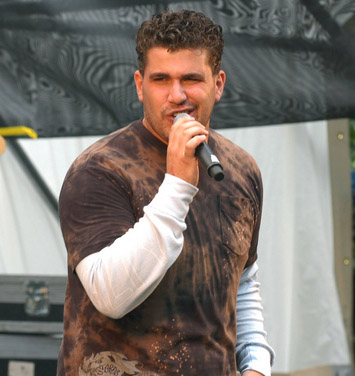
- Gracin in 2006

Background information
- Born: Joshua Mario Gracin; October 18, 1980 (age 46)
- Origin: Westland, Michigan, U.S.
- Genre: Country
- Occupation: Singer
- Years active: 2003–present
- Labels: Lyric Street, Average Joes Entertainment
- Website: joshgracinofficial.com

Joshua Mario Gracin (/ˈɡreɪsɪn/; born October 18, 1980) is an American country music singer. He first gained public attention as the fourth-place finalist on the second season of American Idol. His self-titled debut album was released in 2004. It produced a number one hit, "Nothin' to Lose", and two more top five hits on the Billboard Hot Country Singles & Tracks charts, and was certified gold. His second album, We Weren't Crazy, followed in 2008. This album produced five more chart singles.

== Biography ==
Gracin was born on October 18, 1980, and was raised in Westland, Michigan.

During high school, Gracin performed at state festivals, fairs, and pageants throughout Michigan. At 16, he performed on stage at the Grand Ole Opry in a national talent show.

After graduating from John Glenn High School in Westland, he attended Western Michigan University before he joined the United States Marine Corps where worked as a supply clerk.

== Career ==
=== 2003–2005: Josh Gracin ===
In 2003, Gracin auditioned for the second season of American Idol. He made it to the finals and eventually came in fourth place on the show. However, because of his earlier commitment to the Marine Corps, Gracin was not able to participate in the finalist tour. Gracin was honorably discharged in September 2004.

After singing Rascal Flatts' "I'm Movin' On" on American Idol, Gracin was contacted by Rascal Flatts bass player Jay DeMarcus. That led to a record deal with Lyric Street Records in 2004. Gracin's debut album Josh Gracin was released on June 15, 2004, and went to gold. The album's first three singles ("I Want to Live," "Nothin' to Lose," and "Stay with Me [Brass Bed]"), reached the top five on the Billboard Hot Country Singles & Tracks chart, with "Nothin' to Lose," reaching number one.

In 2005, Gracin also contributed the song "Working for the Weekend" to the Herbie: Fully Loaded soundtrack, and he also sang on "When I See an Elephant Fly" on the Jim Brickman album The Disney Songbook.

=== 2006–2008: We Weren't Crazy ===
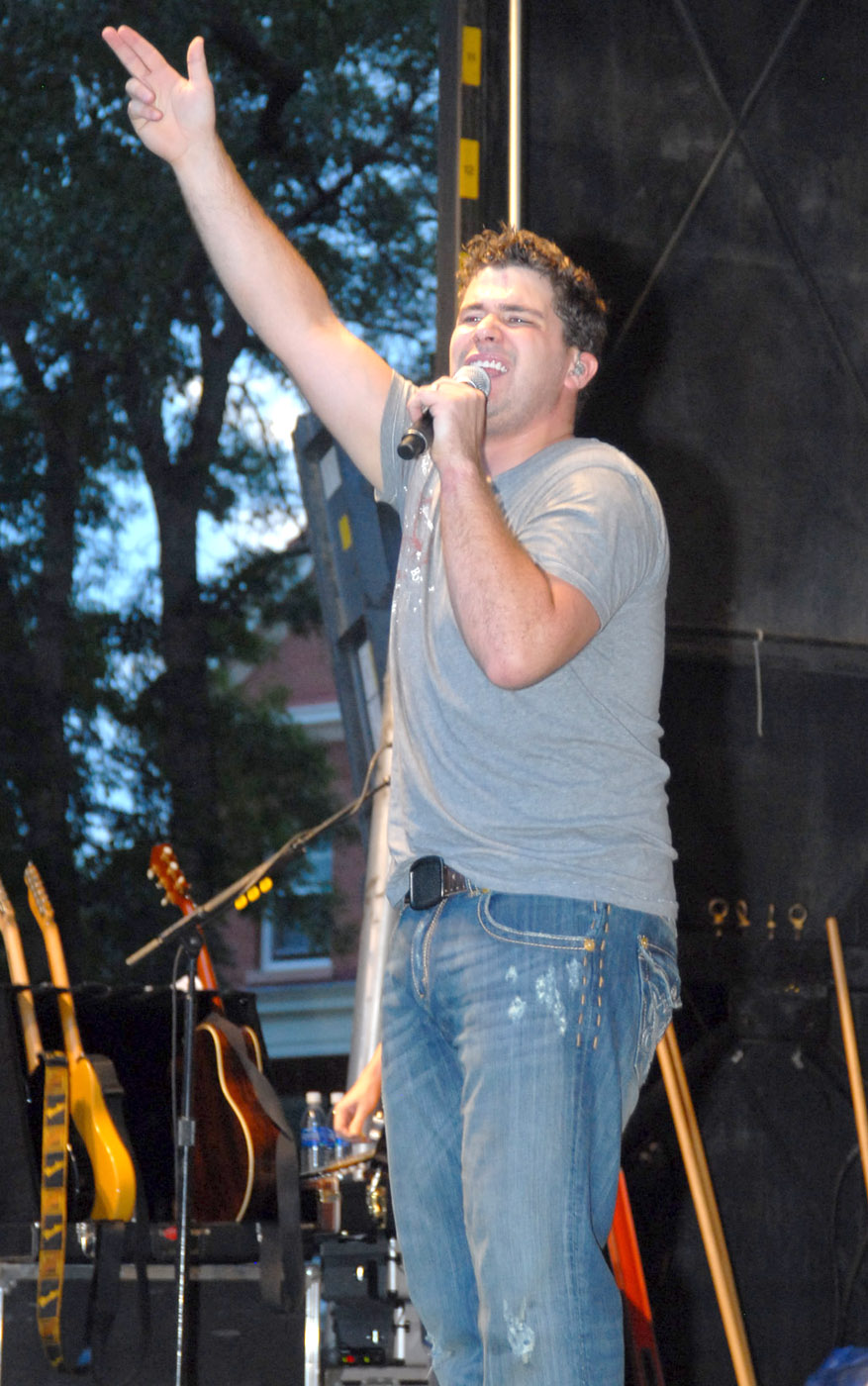
Gracin performing in 2007

In March 2006, Gracin released his fourth single, "Favorite State of Mind." This was followed by the release of the single, We Weren't Crazy. The album of the same name was released in 2008. The single "Unbelievable (Ann Marie)", was released to country radio on August 25, 2008. Gracin wrote the song about his wife. "Telluride," a song originally recorded by Tim McGraw on his 2001 album Set This Circus Down, was released as the album's fifth and final single. Gracin was dropped from Lyric Street Records following the release of "Telluride."

=== 2009–2011: Redemption ===
A new song, "Enough", was posted on Gracin's MySpace page on May 1, 2009, and released to radio in June 2009. It was his first project since leaving Lyric Street Records. The second single, "She's A Different Kind Of Crazy" was released in August 2009.

In January 2010, Gracin signed with Average Joe's Entertainment. His first single under Average Joe's, "Cover Girl," was released in August 2010. Gracin's third album, Redemption, was released on November 8, 2011. The album's next single, "Long Way to Go," became Gracin's first single to chart on the adult contemporary chart.

== Personal life ==
Gracin was married to Ann Marie. They have three daughters born in 2002, 2006 and 2008, and a son born in 2005.

On August 14, 2014, Gracin left a goodbye note on his Facebook account which Rolling Stone described as "[reading] like a suicide note" and TheWrap stated "many perceived [it] as a suicide threat". He was placed on a psychiatric hold in a hospital, but was later released after voluntarily checking himself into an inpatient psychiatric facility. Gracin has maintained the note was not meant as a suicide note, rather as he says a "poorly worded" painful separation letter as his wife insisted on divorcing him. Ann Marie filed for divorce shortly after.

In October 2015, Gracin became engaged to his new girlfriend Katie Weir. The couple married on May 6, 2017. The single "Nothin' Like Us" is reference to his new relationship. Gracin and Weir later had a son in 2020, and a daughter in 2024.

== Songs performed on American Idol ==
Week/theme	Date performed	Song	Artist
Semifinals; N/A	February 25, 2003	"I'll Be"	Edwin McCain
Top 12; Motown	March 11, 2003	"Baby I Need Your Loving"	Four Tops
Top 11; Songs of the Cinema	March 18, 2003	"I Don't Want to Miss a Thing" from Armageddon	Aerosmith
Top 10; Country-Rock	March 25, 2003	"Ain't Goin' Down ('Til the Sun Comes Up)"	Garth Brooks
Top 8 Disco^{1}	April 1, 2003	"Celebration"	Kool & the Gang
Top 8 Billboard Number 1	April 8, 2003	"Amazed"	Lonestar
Top 7 Billy Joel Songs	April 15, 2003	"Piano Man"	Billy Joel
Top 6 Contestant's Choice	April 22, 2003	"That's When I'll Stop Loving You"	'N Sync
Top 5 Neil Sedaka; 1960s	April 29, 2003	"Bad Blood" "Then You Can Tell Me Goodbye"	Neil Sedaka; Neal McCoy
Top 4 Bee Gees	May 6, 2003	"To Love Somebody" "Jive Talkin'"	Bee Gees

- ^Note 1 Due to Corey Clark's disqualification, the Top 9 performances became Top 8 when no one was eliminated.

== Discography ==
Josh Gracin discography
- Studio albums: 3
- Extended plays: 1
- Singles: 17
- Music videos: 6
- No. 1 Singles: 1

=== Studio albums ===
Title	Details	Peak chart positions			Certifications (sales threshold)
Title	Details	US Country	US	US Indie	Certifications (sales threshold)
Josh Gracin	Release date: June 15, 2004; Label: Lyric Street Records; Formats: CD, music download	2	11	—	US: Gold
We Weren't Crazy	Release date: April 1, 2008; Label: Lyric Street Records; Formats: CD, music download	4	33	—	
Redemption	Release date: November 8, 2011; Label: Average Joes Entertainment; Formats: CD, music download	39	—	39	
"—" denotes releases that did not chart

=== Extended plays ===
Title	Details
Nothin' Like Us: Pt. 1	Release date: February 17, 2017; Label: Revel Road Records; Formats: Music download

=== Singles ===
Year	Single	Peak chart positions				Certifications (sales threshold)	Album
Year	Single	US Country	US	US Pop	US AC	Certifications (sales threshold)	Album
2004	"I Want to Live"	4	45	—	—		Josh Gracin
2004	"Nothin' to Lose"	1	39	—	—	US: Gold	Josh Gracin
2005	"Stay with Me (Brass Bed)"	5	47	66	—		Josh Gracin
2006	"Favorite State of Mind"	19	119	—	—		We Weren't Crazy
2006	"I Keep Coming Back"	28	—	—	—		We Weren't Crazy
2007	"We Weren't Crazy"	10	82	78	—		We Weren't Crazy
2008	"Unbelievable (Ann Marie)"	36	—	—	—		We Weren't Crazy
2008	"Telluride"	34	—	—	—		We Weren't Crazy
2009	"Enough"	—	—	—	—		Redemption
2009	"She's a Different Kind of Crazy"	—	—	—	—		Redemption
2010	"Over Me"	—	—	—	—		Redemption
2010	"Cover Girl"	57	—	—	—		Redemption
2011	"Long Way to Go"	—	—	—	16		Redemption
2013	"Drink It Gone"	—	—	—	—		—N/a
2014	"Can't Say Goodbye"	—	—	—	—		Redemption
2017	"Nothin' Like Us"	—	—	—	—		Nothin' Like Us: Pt. 1 – EP
2018	"Good for You"	—	—	—	—		—N/a
2019	"Lucky Stars"	—	—	—	—		—N/a
2019	"Bye Felicia"	—	—	—	—		—N/a
2020	"Home"	—	—	—	—		—N/a
2021	"Love Like"	—	—	—	—		—N/a
2022	"History Repeats"	—	—	—	—		—N/a
2023	"You're On Fire"	—	—	—	—		—N/a
"—" denotes releases that did not chart or were not certified

=== Other charted songs ===
Year	Single	Peak positions	Album
Year	Single	US Country	Album
2006	"Please Come Home for Christmas"	51	—N/a
2006	"O Holy Night"	59	—N/a

=== Music videos ===
Year	Video	Director
2004	"I Want to Live"	Brent Hedgecock
2005	"Nothin' to Lose"	Trey Fanjoy
2005	"Stay with Me (Brass Bed)"	Trey Fanjoy
2006	"Favorite State of Mind"	Roman White
2007	"We Weren't Crazy"	Stephen Shepherd
2011	"Can't Say Goodbye"	Adam Dew
2017	"I Go Crazy"	
