= Trip Around the Sun Tour =

2018 concert tour by Kenny Chesney

- Tour by Kenny Chesney
- Location: North America
- Associated album: Cosmic Hallelujah
- Start date: April 21, 2018
- End date: August 24, 2018
- Legs: 1
- No. of shows: 18
- Box office: $114.3 million

Kenny Chesney concert chronology
- Spread the Love Tour (2016); Trip Around the Sun Tour (2018); Songs for the Saints Tour (2019)

The Trip Around the Sun Tour was the sixteenth headlining concert tour by American country music artist Kenny Chesney. It began on April 21, 2018, in Tampa Bay, Florida and finished on August 24, 2018, in Foxborough, Massachusetts. The tour played NFL, MLB, and MLS stadiums. The tour was first announced in October 2017.

== Commercial reception ==
The tour was marked as Chesney's biggest ever, earning $114.3 million. 1.289 million tickets were reportedly sold.

== Opening acts ==
- Old Dominion
- Thomas Rhett
- Brandon Lay

== Setlists ==
This setlist is a representation of the June 2, 2018, show in Pittsburgh.

1. "Beer in Mexico"
2. "Reality"
3. "Til It's Gone"
4. ”Here and Now”
5. "Summertime"
6. ”We Do”
7. "Pirate Flag"
8. "No Shoes, No Shirt, No Problems"
9. ”Everyone She Knows”
10. "Somewhere with You"
11. "I Go Back"
12. "Get Along"
13. "Anything but Mine"
14. ”Tip of My Tongue”
15. "Save It for a Rainy Day" (performed w/Old Dominion)
16. "When the Sun Goes Down" (performed w/Thomas Rhett)
17. ”Knowing You”
18. "All the Pretty Girls"
19. ”Happy Does”
20. "Living in Fast Forward"
21. "Young"
22. "Noise"
23. "American Kids"
24. "Setting the World on Fire"
25. ”Out Last Night”
26. "Everything's Gonna Be Alright" (David Lee Murphy cover)
27. "Dust on the Bottle" (David Lee Murphy cover)
28. "How Forever Feels"
29. ”The Good Stuff”
30. "Big Star"
31. "Don't Happen Twice"
32. ”The Boys of Fall”

Encore

33. "She Thinks My Tractor's Sexy"

== Tour dates ==
Date	City	Country	Venue	Opening acts	Attendance	Revenue
North America
April 21, 2018	Tampa	United States	Raymond James Stadium	Thomas Rhett; Old Dominion; Brandon Lay	55,292 / 55,292	$6,245,650
April 28, 2018	Milwaukee	United States	Miller Park	Thomas Rhett; Old Dominion; Brandon Lay	43,526 / 43,526	$5,136,660
May 5, 2018	Minneapolis	United States	U.S. Bank Stadium	Thomas Rhett; Old Dominion; Brandon Lay	48,255 / 48,255	$4,999,184
May 12, 2018	Orchard Park	United States	Highmark Stadium	Thomas Rhett; Old Dominion; Brandon Lay	50,255 / 40,655	$6,880,111
May 19, 2018	Arlington	United States	AT&T Stadium	Thomas Rhett; Old Dominion; Brandon Lay	46,274 / 48,625	$3,770,669
May 26, 2018	Atlanta	United States	Mercedes-Benz Stadium	Thomas Rhett; Old Dominion; Brandon Lay	51,312 / 51,312	$5,068,880
June 2, 2018	Pittsburgh	United States	Heinz Field	Thomas Rhett; Old Dominion; Brandon Lay	48,856 / 50,405	$4,603,691
June 9, 2018	Philadelphia	United States	Lincoln Financial Field	Thomas Rhett; Old Dominion; Brandon Lay	55,238 / 55,238	$6,384,845
June 16, 2018	Columbus	United States	Mapfre Stadium	Thomas Rhett; Old Dominion; Brandon Lay	26,455 / 27,207	$3,186,820
June 23, 2018	Phoenix	United States	Chase Field	Thomas Rhett; Old Dominion; Brandon Lay	48,424 / 49,014	$3,198,416
June 30, 2018	Denver	United States	Sports Authority Field at Mile High	Thomas Rhett; Old Dominion; Brandon Lay	51,553 / 53,983	$4,442,006
July 7, 2018	Seattle	United States	CenturyLink Field	Thomas Rhett; Old Dominion; Brandon Lay	48,889 / 50,864	$4,442,006
July 14, 2018	Kansas City	United States	Arrowhead Stadium	Thomas Rhett; Old Dominion; Brandon Lay	57,582 / 57,582	$4,981,733
July 21, 2018	St. Louis	United States	Busch Stadium	Thomas Rhett; Old Dominion; Brandon Lay	44,529 / 44,529	$4,753,888
July 28, 2018	Chicago	United States	Soldier Field	Thomas Rhett; Old Dominion; Brandon Lay	52,189 / 52,189	$5,751,195
August 4, 2018	Detroit	United States	Ford Field	Thomas Rhett; Old Dominion; Brandon Lay	48,826 / 48,826	$4,968,563
August 11, 2018	Nashville	United States	Nissan Stadium	Thomas Rhett; Old Dominion; Brandon Lay	55,182 / 55,182	$5,471,438
August 18, 2018	East Rutherford	United States	MetLife Stadium	Thomas Rhett; Old Dominion; Brandon Lay	58,642 / 58,642	$6,858,291
August 24-25, 2018	Foxborough	United States	Gillette Stadium	Dierks Bentley; Brothers Osborne; Brandon Lay	121,714 / 121,714	$11,631,679
Total						$114.3 million
