= Spread the Love Tour =

2016 concert tour by Kenny Chesney

Spread The Love Tour
- Tour by Kenny Chesney
- Promotional poster for the tour
- Location: North America
- Associated album: Cosmic Hallelujah
- Start date: April 23, 2016
- End date: September 9, 2016
- Legs: 1
- No. of shows: 33
- Box office: $69.8 million

Kenny Chesney concert chronology
- The Big Revival Tour (2015); Spread the Love Tour (2016); Trip Around the Sun Tour (2018)

The Spread the Love Tour was the fifteenth headlining concert tour by American country music artist Kenny Chesney, in support of his seventeenth studio album Cosmic Hallelujah (2016). It began on April 23, 2016 in Auburn, Alabama and finished on September 9, 2016 in Bristol, Tennessee. The tour was first announced in October 2015.

== Opening acts ==
- The Band Perry
- Big & Rich
- Sam Hunt
- Miranda Lambert
- Little Big Town
- Old Dominion
- Jake Owen

== Setlists ==
Some songs not performed at every show, and not always in the same order.

1. "Beer in Mexico"
2. "Reality"
3. "Til It's Gone"
4. ”Here and Now”
5. "Summertime"
6. ”We Do”
7. "Pirate Flag"
8. "No Shoes, No Shirt, No Problems"
9. "Somewhere with You"
10. "I Go Back"
11. ”Get Along”
12. "Anything but Mine"
13. "American Kids"
14. ”Knowing You”
15. "Out Last Night"
16. "Living in Fast Forward"
17. "Young"
18. "Come Over"
19. "You and Tequila"
20. "The Fireman" (George Strait cover, performed w/Miranda Lambert)
21. "Whole Lotta Rosie" (AC/DC cover)
22. "Save It for a Rainy Day" (performed w/Old Dominion)
23. "Noise"
24. "Bar at the End of the World"
25. "My Home's in Alabama"
26. "How Forever Feels"
27. "The Joker"/"Three Little Birds"
28. "Old Blue Chair"
29. "Ocean Front Property" (George Strait cover)
30. "Big Star"
31. "She Thinks My Tractor's Sexy"
32. "Everybody Wants to Go to Heaven"
33. "Don't Happen Twice"
34. "Better as a Memory"
35. "Diggin' Up Bones" (performed in Arlington)

Notes

- "You and Tequila" performed with Miranda at the shows she opened.
- "Come Over" sometimes performed with Sam Hunt.
- Diggin' Up Bones" was performed with surprise guest, Randy Travis in Arlington on June 4, 2016.

== Tour dates ==
Date	City	Country	Venue	Opening acts	Attendance	Revenue
North America
April 23, 2016	Auburn	United States	Jordan–Hare Stadium	Miranda Lambert; Sam Hunt; Old Dominion	48,423 / 50,430	$4,140,740
May 5, 2016	Albuquerque	United States	Isleta Amphitheater	Old Dominion	11,883 / 15,267	$520,892
May 7, 2016	Phoenix	United States	Chase Field	Miranda Lambert; Sam Hunt; Old Dominion	47,922 / 48,700	$3,412,908
May 12, 2016	Asbury Park	United States	The Stone Pony	Old Dominion	—N/a	—N/a
May 13, 2016	Uncasville	United States	Mohegan Sun Arena	Old Dominion	14,094 / 14,094	$1,176,830
May 14, 2016	Uncasville	United States	Mohegan Sun Arena	Old Dominion	14,094 / 14,094	$1,176,830
May 19, 2016	Columbia	United States	Merriweather Post Pavilion	Old Dominion	15,927 / 17,000	$1,060,338
May 20, 2016	Charlotte	United States	PNC Music Pavilion	Old Dominion	17,315 / 18,000	$746,295
May 21, 2016	Raleigh	United States	Coastal Credit Union Music Park at Walnut Creek	Old Dominion	18,966 / 19,000	$801,946
May 26, 2016	Cuyahoga Falls	United States	Blossom Music Center	Old Dominion	20,590 / 20,590	$767,706
May 28, 2016	Louisville	United States	Papa John's Cardinal Stadium	Miranda Lambert; Sam Hunt; Old Dominion	42,448 / 45,500	$2,475,354
June 2, 2016	Rogers	United States	Walmart Arkansas Music Pavilion	Old Dominion	9,747 / 10,172	$702,052
June 4, 2016	Arlington	United States	AT&T Stadium	Miranda Lambert; Jake Owen; Old Dominion	46,273 / 48,535	$3,347,575
June 9, 2016	Toronto	Canada	Molson Canadian Amphitheatre	Old Dominion	14,180 / 16,066	$669,769
June 10, 2016	Hopewell	United States	CMAC	Old Dominion	14,772 / 14,772	$679,643
June 18, 2016	Milwaukee	United States	Miller Park	Miranda Lambert; Little Big Town; Old Dominion	41,342 / 41,342	$4,812,602
June 23, 2016	Virginia Beach	United States	Veterans United Home Loans Amphitheater	Old Dominion	15,337 / 19,805	$644,779
June 25, 2016	Philadelphia	United States	Lincoln Financial Field	Miranda Lambert; Big & Rich; Old Dominion	48,322 / 50,676	$4,634,450
June 30, 2016	Noblesville	United States	Klipsch Music Center	Old Dominion	19,946 / 24,740	$782,857
July 2, 2016	Pittsburgh	United States	Heinz Field	Miranda Lambert; Sam Hunt; Old Dominion	47,111 / 48,577	$3,495,589
July 9, 2016	Bangor	United States	Darling's Waterfront Pavilion	Old Dominion	9,860 / 11,631	$549,575
July 14, 2016	Maryland Heights	United States	Hollywood Casino Amphitheatre	Old Dominion	18,952 / 20,000	$752,700
July 16, 2016	Kansas City	United States	Arrowhead Stadium	Miranda Lambert, Sam Hunt, Old Dominion	51,293 / 53,062	$3,887,143
July 23, 2016	Seattle	United States	CenturyLink Field	Miranda Lambert, Sam Hunt, Old Dominion	48,195 / 50,533	$3,739,539
July 27, 2016 (Note: This concert is a part of Cheyenne Frontier Days.)	Cheyenne	United States	Cheyenne Frontier Days Arena	—N/a		
August 4, 2016	Chula Vista	United States	Sleep Train Amphitheatre	Old Dominion	13,572 / 19,602	$619,668
August 6, 2016	Santa Clara	United States	Levi's Stadium	Miranda Lambert; Sam Hunt; Old Dominion	45,530 / 47,998	$3,808,980
August 13, 2016	Detroit	United States	Ford Field	Miranda Lambert; Jake Owen; Old Dominion Kid Rock	45,938 / 46,984	$3,807,637
August 18, 2016	Bristow	United States	Jiffy Lube Live	Old Dominion	16,434 / 22,523	$735,099
August 20, 2016	East Rutherford	United States	MetLife Stadium	Miranda Lambert; Sam Hunt; Old Dominion	56,292 / 56,292	$5,736,232
August 26, 2016	Foxborough	United States	Gillette Stadium	Miranda Lambert; Sam Hunt; Old Dominion	121,399 / 121,399	$11,455,368
August 27, 2016	Foxborough	United States	Gillette Stadium	Miranda Lambert; Sam Hunt; Old Dominion	121,399 / 121,399	$11,455,368
September 9, 2016	Bristol	United States	Bristol Motor Speedway	The Band Perry; Old Dominion	–	–
Total					922,063 / 973,290 (95%)	$69,883,735

List of festivals

== Band ==
- Kenny Chesney – Lead vocals, guitar
- Wyatt Beard – Keyboards
- Harmoni Kelley – Bass
