= Greatest Hits (Kenny Chesney album) =

Greatest hits album by Kenny Chesney
- Released: September 26, 2000
- Recorded: 1994 – 2000
- Genre: Country
- Length: 1:02:50
- Label: BNA
- Producer: Various

Kenny Chesney chronology
Everywhere We Go (1999)	''Greatest Hits'' (2000)	No Shoes, No Shirt, No Problems (2002)

Singles from Greatest Hits
- 1. "I Lost It" Released: August 14, 2000; 2. "Don't Happen Twice" Released: January 19, 2001; 3. "The Tin Man" Released: July 23, 2001

Professional ratings
Review scores
Source	Rating
Allmusic	4/5 stars

Greatest Hits is the first compilation album by American country music artist Kenny Chesney, released on September 26, 2000, on BNA Records. It features hits from his previous albums, as well as newly recorded tracks. Two of the new tracks — "I Lost It" and "Don't Happen Twice" — were issued as singles. Also released from this album was a re-recording of his 1994 single "The Tin Man". Greatest Hits has been certified 5× platinum by the Recording Industry Association of America (RIAA) for shipments of over five million copies in the United States.

== Content ==
"I Lost It" was the first new release from this album, peaking at number three on the Billboard country charts. This song was co-written by Neil Thrasher along with Diamond Rio guitarist Jimmy Olander, and it features uncredited background vocals from Pam Tillis. Following it was "Don't Happen Twice", which in early 2001 became Chesney's fourth Billboard Number One. The third and final release from this album was a re-recording of "The Tin Man", which was previously released as a single in 1994 from his debut album In My Wildest Dreams, peaking at number 70 that year. The re-recording reached its peak of number 19 in mid-2001, and is his last single to miss the Top Ten. "For the First Time" and "Because of Your Love" are also new to this compilation.

"Back Where I Come From" is a live cover of a song originally released by Mac McAnally from his 1990 album Simple Life. Chesney previously covered this song on his 1996 album Me and You. "Fall in Love", the first single from his 1995 album All I Need to Know, was remixed for the album as well.

== Track listing ==
No.	Title	Writer(s)	Length
1.	"I Lost It" (New song)	Jimmy Olander; Neil Thrasher	3:54
2.	"Don't Happen Twice" (New song)	Curtis Lance; Thom McHugh	3:23
3.	"The Tin Man" (Re-recording)	Stacey Slate; Kenny Chesney; David Lowe	3:37
4.	"Fall in Love" (Remix)	Buddy Brock; Kim Williams; Chesney	2:37
5.	"All I Need to Know"	Mark Alan Springer; Steve Seskin	3:09
6.	"For the First Time" (New song)	Chesney; Phil Vassar	3:38
7.	"Me and You"	Skip Ewing; Ray Herndon	3:39
8.	"Back Where I Come From" (Live version)	Mac McAnally	4:16
9.	"When I Close My Eyes"	Nettie Musick; Springer	3:30
10.	"She's Got It All"	Craig Wiseman; Drew Womack	3:24
11.	"That's Why I'm Here"	Springer; Shaye Smith	4:03
12.	"How Forever Feels"	Wendell Mobley; Tony Mullins	3:08
13.	"You Had Me from Hello"	Ewing; Chesney	3:50
14.	"She Thinks My Tractor's Sexy"	Paul Overstreet; Jim Collins	4:07
15.	"What I Need to Do"	Tom Damphier; Bill Luther	4:04
16.	"Baptism" (Duet with Randy Travis)	Mickey Cates	4:15
17.	"Because of Your Love" (New song)	Marv Green; Chris Lindsey	4:16
Total length:			1:02:50

== Reception ==
MTV's music journalist Chet Flippo criticized the compilation album as a result of "mainstream Nashville labels and their major artists" concentrating on songs that fit the "radio and retail" ideals and push "artistic achievement" out, despite Chesney's talent and "pleasant voice". Flippo praised "That's Why I'm Here" and "Baptism" but panned "She Thinks My Tractor's Sexy", "How Forever Feels", and one of the album's four new songs "I Lost It", which he called "forgettable".

== Personnel ==
- Eddie Bayers – drums
- Barry Beckett – keyboards
- Shannon Brown – background vocals
- Kenny Chesney – lead vocals
- Chad Cromwell – drums
- Eric Darken – percussion
- Sonny Garrish – steel guitar
- Rob Hajacos – fiddle
- Tim Hensley – banjo, acoustic guitar, background vocals
- Wes Hightower – background vocals
- John Hobbs – keyboards, organ, piano
- John Jorgenson – electric guitar
- "Cowboy" Eddie Long – steel guitar
- Jim Bob Gairrett – steel guitar (Track 8)
- B. James Lowry – 12-string acoustic guitar, acoustic guitar, electric guitar
- Randy McCormick – keyboards
- Liana Manis – background vocals
- Phil Naish – keyboards
- Bobby Ogdin – piano
- Larry Paxton – bass guitar
- Don Potter – acoustic guitar
- Michael Rhodes – bass guitar
- Brent Rowan – electric guitar
- Michael Severs – electric guitar
- Joe Spivey – fiddle
- Harry Stinson – background vocals
- Pam Tillis – background vocals on "I Lost It"
- Randy Travis – vocals on "Baptism"
- Phil Vassar – piano, background vocals
- Curtis Young – background vocals

== Charts ==
=== Weekly charts ===
Chart (2000)	Peak position
Canadian Country Albums (RPM)	15
US Billboard 200	13
US Top Country Albums (Billboard)	1

=== Year-end charts ===
Chart (2000)	Position
US Top Country Albums (Billboard)	24
Chart (2001)	Position
Canadian Country Albums (Nielsen SoundScan)	35
US Billboard 200	69
US Top Country Albums (Billboard)	7
Chart (2002)	Position
Canadian Country Albums (Nielsen SoundScan)	66
US Billboard 200	143
US Top Country Albums (Billboard)	17

== Certifications ==
Region	Certification	Certified units/sales
Canada (Music Canada)	Gold	50,000^{^}
United States (RIAA)	5× Platinum	5,000,000^{^}
^{^} Shipments figures based on certification alone.
