= List of RPM number-one country singles of 1999 =

These are the Canadian number-one country songs of 1999, per the RPM Country Tracks chart.

Issue date	Title	Artist	Source
January 11	Let Me Let Go	Faith Hill	
January 25	Fly (The Angel Song)	The Wilkinsons	
February 1	Right on the Money	Alan Jackson	
February 8	Stand Beside Me	Jo Dee Messina	
February 15	Unbelievable	Diamond Rio	
February 22	Unbelievable	Diamond Rio	
March 1	For a Little While	Tim McGraw	(Note: March 1 chart is missing from the chart archives; this position is determined from the "last week" column on the March 8 chart.)
March 8	I Don't Want to Miss a Thing	Mark Chesnutt	
March 15	I Don't Want to Miss a Thing	Mark Chesnutt	
March 22	You Were Mine	Dixie Chicks	
March 29	Powerful Thing	Trisha Yearwood	
April 5	How Forever Feels	Kenny Chesney	
April 12	Meanwhile	George Strait	
April 19	I'll Think of a Reason Later	Lee Ann Womack	
April 26	I'll Think of a Reason Later	Lee Ann Womack	
May 3	Drive Me Wild	Sawyer Brown	
May 10	Please Remember Me	Tim McGraw	
May 17	Please Remember Me	Tim McGraw	
May 24	Anyone Else	Collin Raye	
May 31	Anyone Else	Collin Raye	
June 7	That's the Truth	Paul Brandt	
June 14	That's the Truth	Paul Brandt	
June 21	That's the Truth	Paul Brandt	
June 28	That's the Truth	Paul Brandt	
July 5	Write This Down	George Strait	
July 12	Write This Down	George Strait	
July 19	Amazed	Lonestar	
July 26	Amazed	Lonestar	
August 2	You've Got a Way	Shania Twain	
August 9	You've Got a Way	Shania Twain	
August 16	Crazy Little Thing Called Love	Dwight Yoakam	
August 23	God Must Have Spent a Little More Time on You	Alabama with 'N Sync	
August 30	Amazed	Lonestar	
September 6	Amazed	Lonestar	
September 13	Amazed	Lonestar	
September 20	Single White Female	Chely Wright	
September 27	You Had Me from Hello	Kenny Chesney	
October 4	You Had Me from Hello	Kenny Chesney	
October 11	I Love You	Martina McBride	
October 18	I Love You	Martina McBride	
October 25	Something Like That	Tim McGraw	
November 1	Come On Over	Shania Twain	
November 8	Come On Over	Shania Twain	
November 15	I Love You	Martina McBride	
November 22	I Love You	Martina McBride	
November 29	I Love You	Martina McBride	
December 6	When I Said I Do	Clint Black with Lisa Hartman Black	
December 13	When I Said I Do	Clint Black with Lisa Hartman Black	
December 20	Breathe	Faith Hill	

== See also ==
- 1999 in music
- List of number-one country hits of 1999 (U.S.)
