= Here and Now Tour =

Here and Now Tour may refer to:

- Here and Now Tour (various artists), a multi-artist nostalgia-themed musical tour
- Here and Now Tour (Nickelback)
- Here and Now Tour (Kenny Chesney)
- The Here and Now Tour, by British singer Cliff Richard
