= Take Her Home =

Single by Kenny Chesney

from the album Born
- Released: November 13, 2023
- Genre: Country
- Length: 3:10
- Label: Blue Chair; Warner Nashville
- Songwriters: Michael Hardy; Zach Abend; Hunter Phelps
- Producers: Buddy Cannon; Kenny Chesney

Kenny Chesney singles chronology
"Beer with My Friends" (2022)	"Take Her Home" (2023)	"Just to Say We Did" (2024)

"Take Her Home" is a song by American country music singer Kenny Chesney. It was released on November 13, 2023, as the lead single from his twentieth studio album, Born. The song was written by Michael Hardy, Zach Abend and Hunter Phelps, and produced by Chesney and Buddy Cannon.

== History ==
According to Taste of Country, Hardy texted Chesney, asking if he wanted to hear a new song he wrote; Chesney agreed to record the song as he thought its lyrics would appeal to fans.

The song is about a growing relationship between a man and a woman. Hardy also contributes backing vocals.

== Commercial performance ==
"Take Her Home" entered the top 10 on the Billboard Country Airplay chart dated April 27, 2024, becoming Chesney's 61st top 10 single and tying him with George Strait for the most top 10 singles on that chart. It reached number one on the chart dated June 22, 2024, becoming Chesney's 33rd number-one single, his first solo number one since "Here and Now" in 2020, as well as his first overall since "Half of My Hometown" with Kelsea Ballerini in March 2022.

== Charts ==
=== Weekly charts ===
Weekly chart performance
Chart (2023–2024)	Peak position
Canada Country (Billboard)	4
US Billboard Hot 100	71
US Country Airplay (Billboard)	1
US Hot Country Songs (Billboard)	19

=== Year-end charts ===
Annual chart rankings
Chart (2024)	Position
US Country Airplay (Billboard)	12
US Hot Country Songs (Billboard)	62
US Radio Songs (Billboard)	59
