= List of Hot Country Singles & Tracks number ones of 1999 =

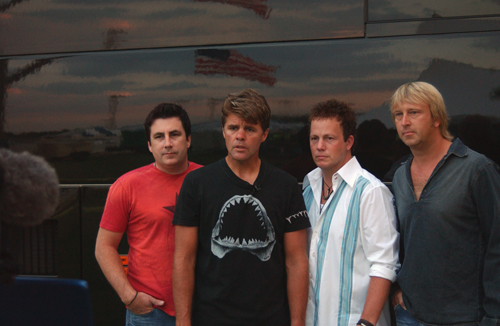
Lonestar spent eight weeks at number one with "Amazed", the longest run of the year.

Hot Country Songs is a chart that ranks the top-performing country music songs in the United States, published by Billboard magazine. In 1999, 19 different songs topped the chart, then published under the title Hot Country Singles & Tracks, in 52 issues of the magazine, based on weekly airplay data from country music radio stations compiled by Nielsen Broadcast Data Systems.

At the start of the year, the number one song on the chart was "You're Easy on the Eyes" by Terri Clark, one of seven female vocalists to top the chart during the year; during the late 1990s, female performers achieved a level of success on the country charts greater than they did in the first half of the decade or would in the next decade. Two female vocalists achieved the first number one singles of their careers in 1999: Sara Evans with "No Place That Far" in March and Chely Wright with "Single White Female" in September, as did Mark Wills in May with "Wish You Were Here" and Brad Paisley with "He Didn't Have to Be" in December. Jo Dee Messina topped the chart in January with "Stand Beside Me", the third number one song taken from her album I'm Alright and became the first female vocalist to have multi-week runs at number one with three consecutive singles from one album since Billboard began tracking country albums in 1964.

The longest unbroken run at number one in 1999 was the eight weeks spent at the top by Lonestar's "Amazed", the lengthiest uninterrupted spell at the top of the country singles chart since David Houston had a nine-week run at number one with "Almost Persuaded" in 1966. The song also set a record for the longest run at number one on the country chart since Nielsen Broadcast Data Systems was initiated in 1990, a record which would be tied in 2003 and not beaten until 2023. "Amazed" also achieved considerable crossover success, topping the magazine's all-genre singles chart, the Hot 100, the first time a country act had achieved this feat since Kenny Rogers and Dolly Parton with their duet "Islands in the Stream" in 1983. Four other songs spent more than a month at the top of the Hot Country Singles & Tracks chart. Kenny Chesney spent six weeks at the top with "How Forever Feels" from March to May, and Tim McGraw spent five weeks at number one with both "Please Remember Me" and "Something Like That", the latter of which was immediately followed by a five-week run by Martina McBride's "I Love You". McGraw's total of ten weeks at number one was the highest for any act in 1999. He, Chesney and McBride were the only acts to reach the top with more than one song during the year. The final number one song of the year was "Breathe" by Faith Hill.

== Chart history ==
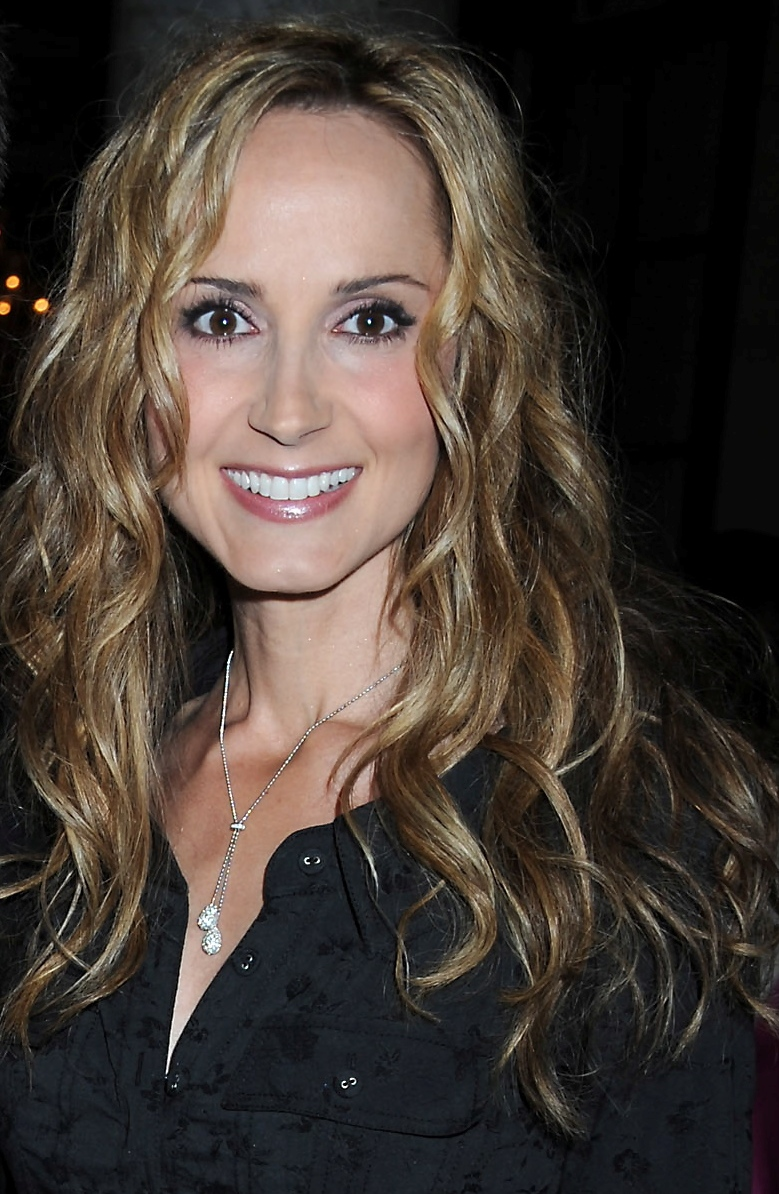
Chely Wright achieved the only number one of her career to date in 1999.

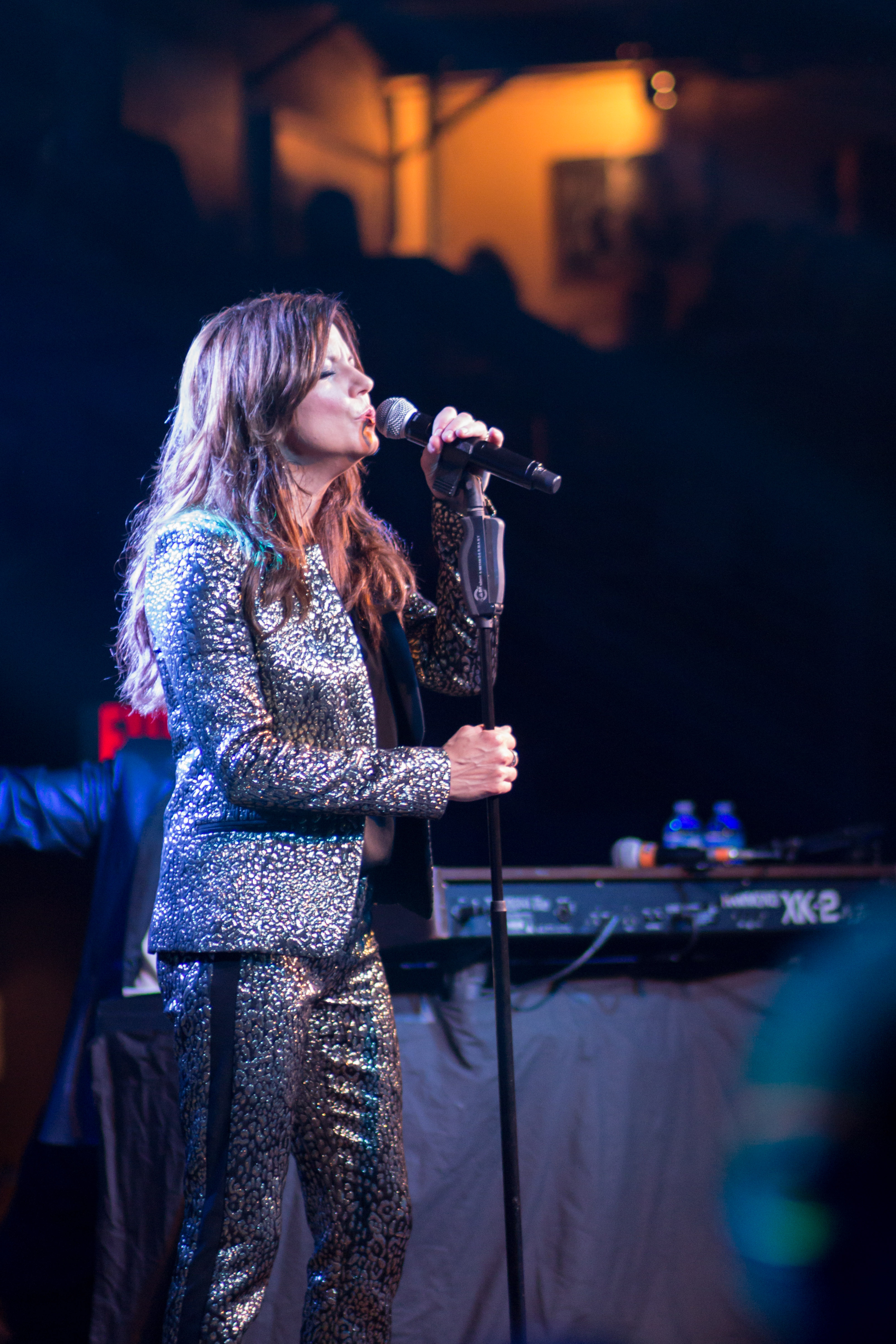
Martina McBride's two number-one hits spent a total of six weeks at the top of the chart.

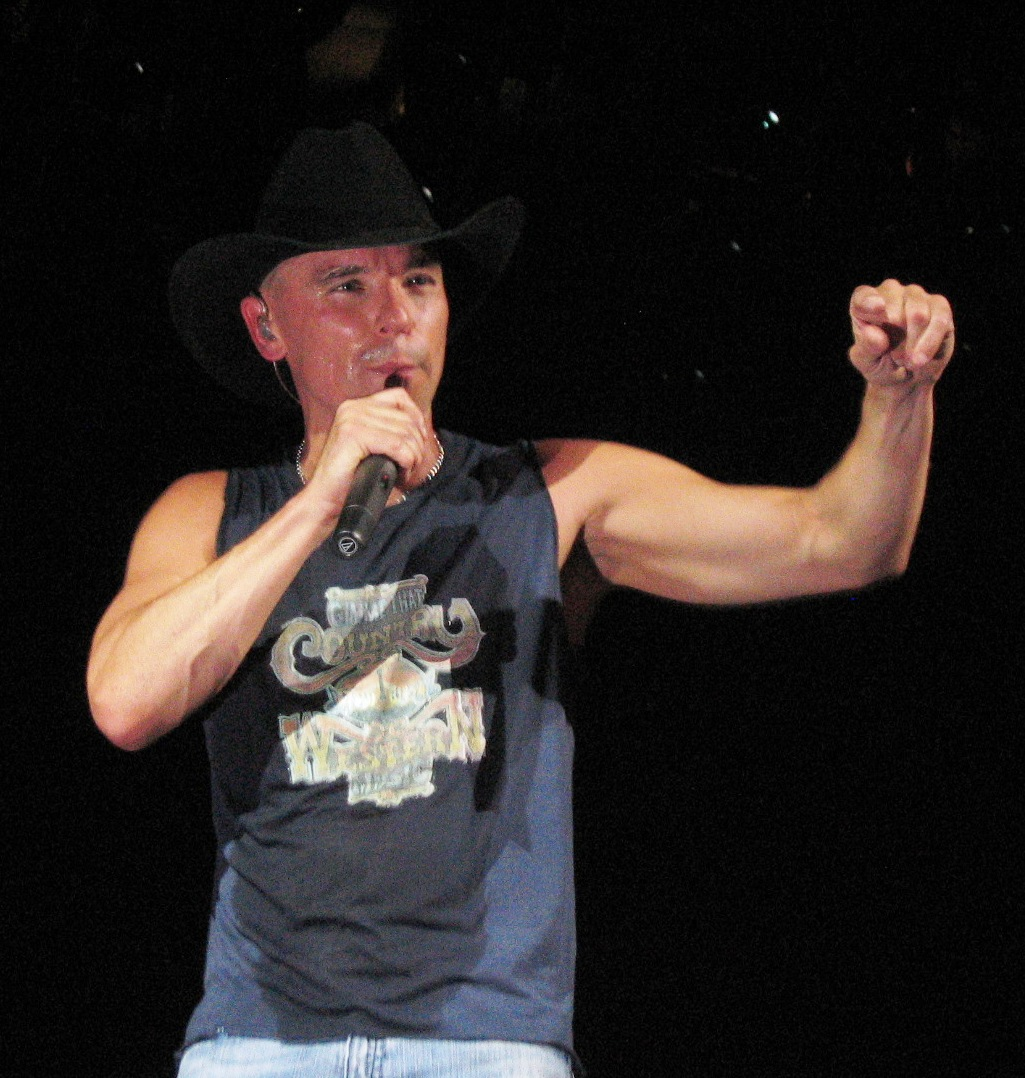
Kenny Chesney's "How Forever Feels" had a six-week run at number one.

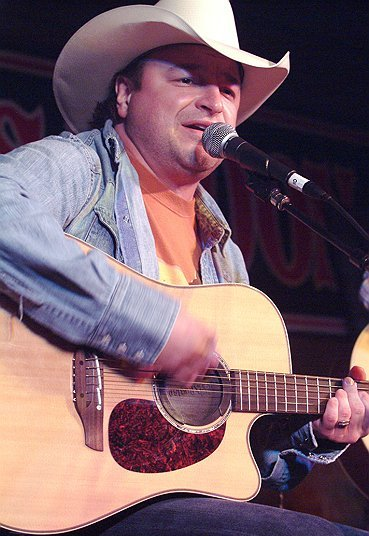
Mark Chesnutt topped the chart with his cover version of Aerosmith's "I Don't Want to Miss a Thing".

Table of number one songs
Issue date	Title	Artist(s)	Ref.
January 2	"You're Easy on the Eyes"	Terri Clark	
January 9	"You're Easy on the Eyes"	Terri Clark	
January 16	"Right on the Money"	Alan Jackson	
January 23	"Wrong Again"	Martina McBride	
January 30	"Stand Beside Me"	Jo Dee Messina	
February 6	"Stand Beside Me"	Jo Dee Messina	
February 13	"Stand Beside Me"	Jo Dee Messina	
February 20	"I Don't Want to Miss a Thing"	Mark Chesnutt	
February 27	"I Don't Want to Miss a Thing"	Mark Chesnutt	
March 6	"No Place That Far"	Sara Evans	
March 13	"You Were Mine"	Dixie Chicks	
March 20	"You Were Mine"	Dixie Chicks	
March 27	"How Forever Feels"	Kenny Chesney	
April 3	"How Forever Feels"	Kenny Chesney	
April 10	"How Forever Feels"	Kenny Chesney	
April 17	"How Forever Feels"	Kenny Chesney	
April 24	"How Forever Feels"	Kenny Chesney	
May 1	"How Forever Feels"	Kenny Chesney	
May 8	"Wish You Were Here"	Mark Wills	
May 15	"Please Remember Me"	Tim McGraw	
May 22	"Please Remember Me"	Tim McGraw	
May 29	"Please Remember Me"	Tim McGraw	
June 5	"Please Remember Me"	Tim McGraw	
June 12	"Please Remember Me"	Tim McGraw	
June 19	"Write This Down"	George Strait	
June 26	"Write This Down"	George Strait	
July 3	"Write This Down"	George Strait	
July 10	"Write This Down"	George Strait	
July 17	"Amazed"	Lonestar	
July 24	"Amazed"	Lonestar	
July 31	"Amazed"	Lonestar	
August 7	"Amazed"	Lonestar	
August 14	"Amazed"	Lonestar	
August 21	"Amazed"	Lonestar	
August 28	"Amazed"	Lonestar	
September 4	"Amazed"	Lonestar	
September 11	"Single White Female"	Chely Wright	
September 18	"You Had Me from Hello"	Kenny Chesney	
September 25	"Something Like That"	Tim McGraw	
October 2	"Something Like That"	Tim McGraw	
October 9	"Something Like That"	Tim McGraw	
October 16	"Something Like That"	Tim McGraw	
October 23	"Something Like That"	Tim McGraw	
October 30	"I Love You"	Martina McBride	
November 6	"I Love You"	Martina McBride	
November 13	"I Love You"	Martina McBride	
November 20	"I Love You"	Martina McBride	
November 27	"I Love You"	Martina McBride	
December 4	"When I Said I Do"	Clint Black with Lisa Hartman Black	
December 11	"He Didn't Have to Be"	Brad Paisley	
December 18	"When I Said I Do"	Clint Black with Lisa Hartman Black	
December 25	"Breathe"	Faith Hill	

== See also ==
- 1999 in music
- List of artists who reached number one on the U.S. country chart
