= I Lost It =

2000 single by Kenny Chesney

Single by Kenny Chesney

from the album Greatest Hits
- B-side: "The Tin Man"
- Released: August 14, 2000
- Recorded: 2000
- Genre: Country
- Length: 3:54
- Label: BNA
- Songwriters: Neil Thrasher; Jimmy Olander
- Producers: Buddy Cannon; Norro Wilson; Kenny Chesney

Kenny Chesney singles chronology
"What I Need to Do" (2000)	"I Lost It" (2000)	"Don't Happen Twice" (2001)

"I Lost It" is a song written by Jimmy Olander of Diamond Rio and Neil Thrasher and recorded by American country music artist Kenny Chesney. It was released on August 14, 2000 as the first single from Chesney's Greatest Hits compilation album. It peaked at number 3 in late 2000. Pam Tillis provides background vocals for the song.

In early July 2000, a shipment of the promotional CDs was seized by U.S. Customs at the O'Hare International Airport in Chicago. The singles came packaged with "English Water."

== Music video ==
This was the last Kenny Chesney video that Martin Kahan directed, and produced by Jamie Amos. It was filmed in black-and-white, and premiered on CMT on August 23, 2000, during "The CMT Delivery Room". It was filmed on location at the Westin Resort, in St. John, U.S. Virgin Islands.

== Charts ==
Chart (2000–2001)	Peak position
Canada Country Singles (RPM)	21 (Note: "I Lost It" had not yet peaked when RPM ceased publication in November 2000.)
US Hot Country Songs (Billboard)	3
US Billboard Hot 100	34

=== Year-end charts ===
Chart (2000)	Position
US Country Songs (Billboard)	62

Chart (2001)	Position
US Country Songs (Billboard)	49

== Certifications ==
Region	Certification	Certified units/sales
United States (RIAA)	Gold	500,000^{‡}
^{‡} Sales+streaming figures based on certification alone.
