= The Tin Man (Kenny Chesney song) =

Single by Kenny Chesney

from the album In My Wildest Dreams (1994) All I Need to Know (1995) Greatest Hits (2000)
- B-side: "I Finally Found Somebody" (1994 version only)
- Released: April 19, 1994; July 23, 2001 (re-release)
- Genre: Country
- Length: 3:28; 3:37 (re-release)
- Label: Capricorn (1994); BNA (2001)
- Songwriters: Kenny Chesney; Stacey Slate; David Lowe
- Producers: Barry Beckett (1994); Kenny Chesney, Buddy Cannon, and Norro Wilson (2001)

Kenny Chesney singles chronology
"Whatever It Takes" (1993)	"The Tin Man" (1994)	"Somebody's Callin'" (1994)

Kenny Chesney (2001) singles chronology
"Don't Happen Twice" (2001)	"The Tin Man" (2001)	"Young" (2001)

"The Tin Man" is a song co-written and recorded by American country music singer Kenny Chesney. It was the second single released from his 1994 debut album In My Wildest Dreams. Six years later, Chesney re-recorded the song for his first Greatest Hits compilation album and released this recording in July 2001 as the album's third single.

== Content ==
"The Tin Man" is a ballad about a brokenhearted man who wishes that he were the Tin Woodman so that he "wouldn't have a heart" and thus not feel the emotions that he is feeling.

The song is set in the key of E major with a main chord pattern of E-C♯m-A-B.

== Critical reception ==
In a 1995 review, Phil Kloer of the Atlanta Journal-Constitution called the song "one of the better pieces of writing to come out of Nashville this year or last." Stephen Thomas Erlewine of Allmusic said that the song was not "quite as shellacked with gloss" as Chesney's later ballads. Billboard's review praised Chesney's vocals while taking a negative view of the songwriting: "[H]e is hitting his stride as a singer, even if The Wizard of Oz references here are a little tired."

The original version later appeared on Chesney's first BNA Records album, All I Need to Know. In his review of this album, Erlewine wrote that the song "deftly reworks a cliché" and "captur[es] the blend of country instrumentation and anthemic pop that became his signature and made him a star."

Chesney re-recorded the song for his 2000 Greatest Hits album. This newly recorded version was the B-side to the album's first single, "I Lost It", before serving as the third release from it in 2001.

== Music video ==
The music video for "The Tin Man", directed by Tom Bevins, premiered on CMT on April 23, 1994, when CMT named it a "Hot Shot". A video for the 2001 re-recording was to have been directed by Trey Fanjoy; this video would have been shot on September 11, 2001, in front of the World Trade Center, but label executives canceled the shoot only a few days prior after determining that the song did not need a video.

== Chart performance ==
The original recording of "The Tin Man" entered the Billboard Hot Country Singles & Tracks (now Hot Country Songs) charts dated for the week ending May 14, 1994, peaking at number 70 with a six-week run on the charts. The 2001 version first charted on the week ending July 28, 2001, spending 20 weeks on that chart and peaking at number 19. It also peaked at number seven on the Bubbling Under Hot 100.

Chart (1994)	Peak position
US Hot Country Songs (Billboard)	70
Chart (2001)	Peak position
US Hot Country Songs (Billboard)	19
US Billboard Bubbling Under Hot 100	7
