= Born (Kenny Chesney album) =

Studio album by Kenny Chesney
- Released: March 22, 2024
- Genre: Country
- Length: 50:53
- Labels: Blue Chair; Warner Nashville
- Producers: Buddy Cannon; Kenny Chesney

Kenny Chesney chronology
Here and Now (2020)	Born (2024)	Silver Sands Marina (2026)

Singles from Born
- 1. "Take Her Home" Released: November 10, 2023; 2. "Just to Say We Did" Released: July 15, 2024

Born is the twentieth studio album by American country music singer Kenny Chesney. It was released on March 22, 2024, via Warner Records Nashville and Blue Chair Records. The album includes the singles "Take Her Home" and "Just to Say We Did".

== History ==
In an interview with American Songwriter, Chesney stated that he began selecting songs for Born during the COVID-19 pandemic, as the pandemic allowed him to spend more time in the studio than he did previously. He stated that "I think it was less worrying about checking boxes or worrying about 'What do we have?' and more about the spirit of going into the studio and being creative."

The album is Chesney's first since Here and Now four years prior. As with most of his previous albums, he co-produced with Buddy Cannon. "Take Her Home" is the album's lead single. This is his first studio album since 2013’s “Life on a Rock” to not produce a top 40 hit on the Billboard Hot 100 chart.

== Track listing ==
Born track listing
No.	Title	Writer(s)	Length
1.	"Born"	Greylan James; Heather Morgan	4:12
2.	"Just to Say We Did"	Kenny Chesney; Brett James; David Lee Murphy; Matt Dragstrem	2:34
3.	"Take Her Home"	Zach Abend; Hunter Phelps; Michael Hardy	3:03
4.	"Few Good Stories"	Rhett Akins; Ben Hayslip; Chris Stevens	2:39
5.	"Thinkin' 'Bout"	Tucker Beathard; Kyle Fishman	3:34
6.	"Guilty Pleasure"	Chesney; Josh Osborne; Shane McAnally; Ross Copperman	3:28
7.	"One More Sunset"	B. James; Tim James; Danny Myrick	3:12
8.	"Top Down"	Park Chisolm	4:39
9.	"The Way I Love You Now"	Chesney; Mike Reid	4:01
10.	"This Too Shall Pass"	Brent Cobb; Charlie Worsham; Jaren Johnston	3:25
11.	"Blame It on the Salt"	Ernest Keith Smith; Ryan Vojtesak; Dragstrem	2:39
12.	"Come Here, Go Away"	Chesney; Osborne; McAnally; G. James	3:18
13.	"One Lonely Island"	Chesney; Osborne; Murphy; Copperman	3:11
14.	"Long Gone"	Tony Martin; Wendell Mobley	2:42
15.	"Wherever You Are Tonight"	Reid; Gary Burr	4:09
Total length:			50:53

== Personnel ==
Musicians

- Kenny Chesney – lead vocals (all tracks)
- Kenny Greenberg – electric guitar (all tracks), acoustic guitar (10)
- Danny Rader – acoustic guitar (tracks 1–4, 6–13, 15), electric guitar (2, 3, 7, 10, 12–14), bouzouki (2, 3, 8, 15), nylon-string guitar (5), banjo (7), percussion (11)
- Tony Lucido – bass (tracks 1, 4, 5, 9, 10, 12, 14, 15)
- Chad Cromwell – drums (tracks 1, 4, 8–10)
- Pat Buchanan – electric guitar (tracks 1, 4, 8–10)
- Michael Rojas – Hammond B3 organ (tracks 1, 4, 10, 12), Wurlitzer (4), synthesizer (8, 9), piano (9, 10)
- Greylan James – background vocals (tracks 1, 12)
- Dan Tyminski – acoustic guitar (track 1)
- Heather Morgan – background vocals (track 1)
- Jeff Egan – background vocals (track 1)
- Katlyn Flynn – background vocals (track 1)
- Nick Buda – drums (tracks 2, 3, 5–7, 11–15), tambourine (2, 3), percussion (5, 7, 15)
- David Dorn – synthesizer (tracks 2, 3, 6, 7, 11, 13, 15), piano (14, 15), Hammond B3 organ (14)
- Jimmie Lee Sloas – bass (tracks 2, 3, 6, 7, 11, 13)
- David Huff – programming (tracks 2, 3, 5, 6)
- Hardy – background vocals (tracks 2, 3)
- F. Reid Shippen – programming (tracks 4, 8, 9, 14, 15), tambourine (5, 6)
- Chris Stevens – programming (track 4)
- Laci Kaye Booth – background vocals (track 5)
- Josh Osborne – background vocals (tracks 6, 13)
- Dan Dugmore – steel guitar (track 6)
- Brett James – background vocals (track 7)
- Kat Higgins – background vocals (track 8)
- Wyatt Beard – background vocals (tracks 10, 14)
- Ernest – background vocals (track 11)
- Sam Bacco – percussion (track 12)

Technical

- Kenny Chesney – production
- Buddy Cannon – production
- Andrew Mendelson – mastering
- F. Reid Shippen – mixing
- Tony Castle – engineering
- Chris Stevens – additional engineering (tracks 1, 4–15)
- Danny Rader – additional engineering (tracks 1, 4–15)
- Greylan James – additional engineering (tracks 1, 4–15)
- Matt Dragstrem – additional engineering (tracks 1, 4–15)
- Brandon Towles – mixing assistance
- Joey Salit – mastering assistance (tracks 2, 3)
- Taylor Chadwick – mastering assistance (tracks 2, 3)
- Collin Reynolds – engineering assistance (tracks 1, 4–15)
- Jacob Butler – engineering assistance (tracks 1, 4–15)
- Joe Trentacosti – engineering assistance (tracks 1, 4–15)
- Joey Stanca – engineering assistance (tracks 1, 4–15)
- Michael Walter – engineering assistance (tracks 1, 4–15)
- Michelle Freetly – engineering assistance (tracks 1, 4–15)
- Sean Badum – engineering assistance (tracks 1, 4–15)
- Steve Cordray – engineering assistance (tracks 1, 4–15)
- Trent Woodman – engineering assistance (tracks 1, 4–15)
- Zach Kuhlman – engineering assistance (tracks 1, 4–15)
- Zack Pancoast – engineering assistance (tracks 1, 4–15)

== Charts ==
Chart performance for Born
Chart (2024)	Peak position
UK Album Downloads (Official Charts)	60
UK Country Albums (Official Charts)	10
US Billboard 200	20
US Top Country Albums (Billboard)	5
