= Just to Say We Did =

Single by Kenny Chesney

from the album Born
- Released: July 15, 2024
- Genre: Country
- Length: 2:35 (album version); 2:30 (video version)
- Label: Blue Chair; Warner Nashville
- Songwriters: Brett James; David Lee Murphy; Kenny Chesney; Matt Dragstrem
- Producers: Buddy Cannon; Kenny Chesney

Kenny Chesney singles chronology
"Take Her Home" (2023)	"Just to Say We Did" (2024)	"You Had to Be There" (2025)

Music video
- "Just to Say We Did" on YouTube

"Just to Say We Did" is a song by American country music singer Kenny Chesney. It was released on July 15, 2024, as the second single from his twentieth studio album, Born. The song was written by Chesney, Brett James, David Lee Murphy and Matt Dragstrem, and produced by Chesney and Buddy Cannon.

== Background and content ==
Chesney shared to the song on his social media accounts as "sounds like me and my friends growing up, and so many people I've met along the way. It's a song where whatever it is, why not?"

Chesney first released the song as a preview of his studio album Born on February 2, 2024.

The song expresses celebrates life and all the moments that bring one joy.

== Critical reception ==
HollerCountry writer Maxim Mower felt that it "the introduction of an invigorating wave of electric guitars and a seismic sea of drums, which, alongside Kenny Chesney's euphoric delivery, combines for an earworm that seems to gain another injection of energy with each new line."

== Music video ==
The music video was directed by Shaun Silva and was released on August 21, 2024. According to Chesney, "wanted a song that really lifted up the heart of No Shoes Nation, these super-passionate people who just live wide open right where they are and create fun when they're not working harder than anyone" and that "is the crazy story of this dream, my band, road family and every single person we've encountered along the way."

== Chart performance ==
=== Weekly charts ===
Weekly chart performance for "Just to Say We Did"
Chart (2024–2025)	Peak position
Canada Country (Billboard)	28
US Country Airplay (Billboard)	16

=== Year-end charts ===
Year-end chart performance for "Just to Say We Did"
Chart (2025)	Position
US Country Airplay (Billboard)	52
