= In My Wildest Dreams =

Studio album by Kenny Chesney
- Released: April 19, 1994
- Recorded: 1993–1994
- Studios: OmniSound; Woodland Digital (Nashville)
- Genre: Country
- Length: 30:07
- Label: Capricorn
- Producer: Barry Beckett

Kenny Chesney chronology
In My Wildest Dreams (1994)	All I Need to Know (1995)

Singles from In My Wildest Dreams
- 1. "Whatever It Takes" Released: December 18, 1993; 2. "The Tin Man" Released: April 19, 1994; 3. "Somebody's Callin'" Released: July 26, 1994

Professional ratings
Review scores
Source	Rating
Allmusic	3/5 stars
Entertainment Weekly	B+

In My Wildest Dreams is the debut studio album by American country music artist Kenny Chesney. It was released on April 19, 1994, his only album with the Capricorn Records label. The title track was previously recorded by Aaron Tippin on his 1991 debut album You've Got to Stand for Something, while "I Want My Rib Back" was originally recorded by Keith Whitley on his album Kentucky Bluebird.

This album produced two chart singles for Chesney in 1994 on the Billboard country charts: "Whatever It Takes" at number 59 and "The Tin Man" at number 70. The latter song would also be included on his next album, All I Need to Know. Chesney also re-recorded "The Tin Man" in 2000 for his first Greatest Hits album, and released the new rendition as a single that year.

== Track listing ==
No.	Title	Writer(s)	Length
1.	"Whatever It Takes"	Kenny Chesney, Buddy Brock, Kim Williams	3:01
2.	"Somebody's Callin'"	Chesney, Donny Kees	2:36
3.	"The Tin Man"	Chesney, Stacey Slate, David Lowe	3:28
4.	"High and Dry"	Michael Huffman, Mike Geiger, Woody Mullis	2:57
5.	"I Finally Found Somebody"	Chesney, Kees	2:40
6.	"When She Calls Me Baby"	Chesney, Rick Williamson	3:34
7.	"In My Wildest Dreams"	Kees, Aaron Tippin	2:37
8.	"I Want My Rib Back"	Fred Koller, Keith Whitley	2:54
9.	"Angel Loved the Devil"	Neil Thrasher, Williams	3:30
10.	"I'd Love to Change Your Name"	Chesney, Kees, Jim Weatherly	2:48
Total length:			30:07

== Personnel ==
- Eddie Bayers – drums
- Kenny Chesney – acoustic guitar, lead vocals
- Glen Duncan – fiddle
- Paul Franklin – steel guitar
- Rob Hajacos – fiddle
- High and Dry Party Choir – background vocals and clapping on "High and Dry"
- Steve Nathan – keyboards
- Tammy Pierce – background vocals
- Don Potter – acoustic guitar, electric guitar
- Michael Rhodes – bass guitar
- Hargus "Pig" Robbins – keyboards
- Brent Rowan – electric guitar
- Harry Stinson – background vocals
- Dennis Wilson – background vocals
- Curtis Young – background vocals

== Chart performance ==
=== Album ===
Chart (1994)	Peak position
U.S. Billboard Top Heatseekers	37

=== Singles ===
Year	Single	Peak positions
Year	Single	US Country
1993	"Whatever It Takes"	59
1994	"The Tin Man"	70
1994	"Somebody's Callin'"	—
"—" denotes releases that did not chart.
