= Nissan Stadium (Nashville) =

Stadium in Nashville, Tennessee

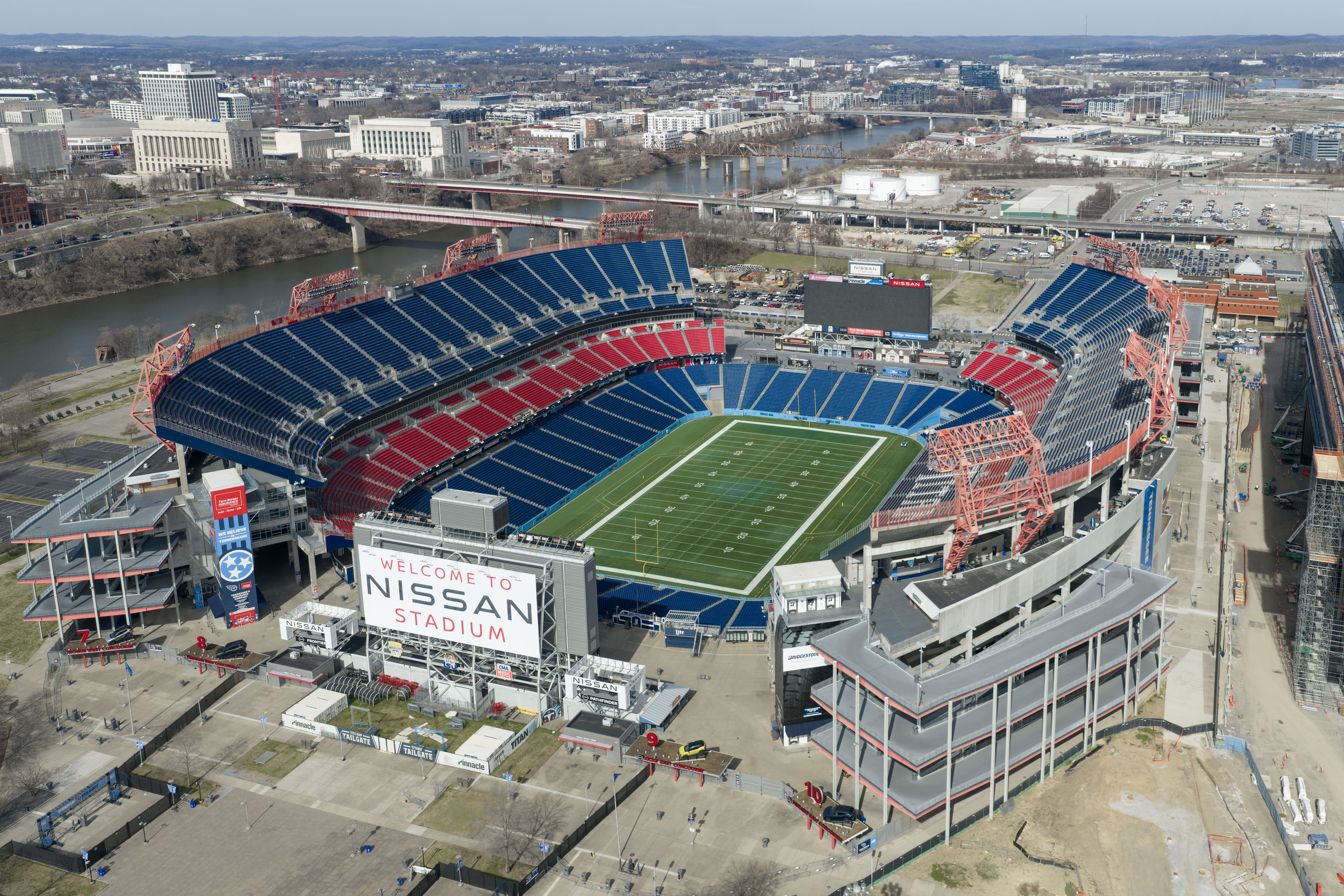
- View from south in 2026

- Location in the United States Location in Tennessee
- Interactive map of Nissan Stadium
- Former names: Adelphia Coliseum (1999–2002); The Coliseum (2002–2006); LP Field (2006–2015)
- Address: 1 Titans Way
- Location: Nashville, Tennessee, U.S.
- Coordinates: 36°9′59″N 86°46′17″W
- Elevation: 450 feet (140 m) AMSL
- Owner: Metropolitan Government of Nashville and Davidson County
- Operator: Metropolitan Government of Nashville and Davidson County
- Capacity: 69,143 (2006–present) Former capacity: List: 67,700 (1999); 68,498 (2000); 68,798 (2001); 68,804 (2002); 68,809 (2003); 68,932 (2004); 69,149 (2005)
- Executive suites: 177
- Surface: Matrix Helix Turf (2023–present); Natural grass (1999–2022)
- Record attendance: Overall: 73,874 (Ed Sheeran, +–=÷× Tour, July 22, 2023) List: College football: 69,507 (September 2, 2023, Tennessee Volunteers vs. Virginia Cavaliers); Professional football: 69,484 (October 24, 2021, Kansas City Chiefs at Tennessee Titans); Soccer: 59,068 (February 29, 2020, Atlanta United FC at Nashville SC)

Construction
- Groundbreaking: May 3, 1997
- Opened: August 27, 1999; 27 years ago
- Cost: $290 million
- Architects: HOK Sport; McKissack & McKissack; Moody Nolan
- Project manager: The Larkin Group
- Structural engineer: Thornton Tomasetti
- Services engineers: M-E Engineers, Inc.
- General contractors: The Stadium Group, comprising Bovis, Jones & Jones Construction and Beers Construction

Tenants
- Tennessee Titans (NFL) (1999–present); Tennessee State Tigers (NCAA) (1999–present); Nashville SC (MLS) (2020–2021); Music City Bowl (NCAA) (1999–present)

Website
- nissanstadium.com

Nissan Stadium is a multi-purpose stadium in Nashville, Tennessee, United States. Owned by the Metropolitan Government of Nashville and Davidson County, it is primarily used for football and is the home field of the Tennessee Titans of the National Football League (NFL) and the Tigers of Tennessee State University. The stadium is the site of the Music City Bowl, a postseason college football bowl game played each December, and from 2020 until 2021 the home field of Nashville SC of Major League Soccer (MLS). It is used for concerts such as those affiliated with the CMA Music Festival each June. The stadium also has facilities to host public events, meetings, and parties.

Nissan Stadium is located on the east bank of the Cumberland River, across the river from downtown Nashville and has a seating capacity of 69,143. Its first regular-season game was a 36–35 win over the Cincinnati Bengals on September 12, 1999. Nissan Stadium has been known by Adelphia Coliseum (1999–2002), The Coliseum (2002–2006), and LP Field (2006–2015).

The stadium features three levels of seating. The lower bowl encompasses the field and the club and upper levels form the stadium's dual towers, rising above the lower bowl along each sideline. The stadium's luxury suites are located within the towers. Three levels of suites are located in the stadium's eastern tower, one between the lower and club levels, and two between the club and upper levels. The western tower has two levels of suites between the club and upper levels. The press box is located between the lower and club levels in the western tower. Nissan Stadium's dual video boards are behind the lower bowl in each end zone. On the stadium's eastern side is the Titans Pro Shop, a retail store that sells team merchandise.

As of the 2023 season, the playing surface of the stadium is Matrix Helix Turf with an organic infill. Prior to 2023, the playing surface was Tifsport Bermuda Sod, a natural grass. The climate of Nashville and the wear of hosting a game nearly every weekend often required the field to be resodded in the area between the hashes in November, and the stadium had amongst the highest lower body injuries of any in the NFL during the 2018–2021 seasons.

With Tennessee State being tenants, Nissan Stadium is the largest stadium in the Football Championship Subdivision (FCS, formerly Division I-AA).

In 2027, the stadium will be replaced with an indoor venue (also named Nissan Stadium), currently under construction on an adjacent lot.

== History ==
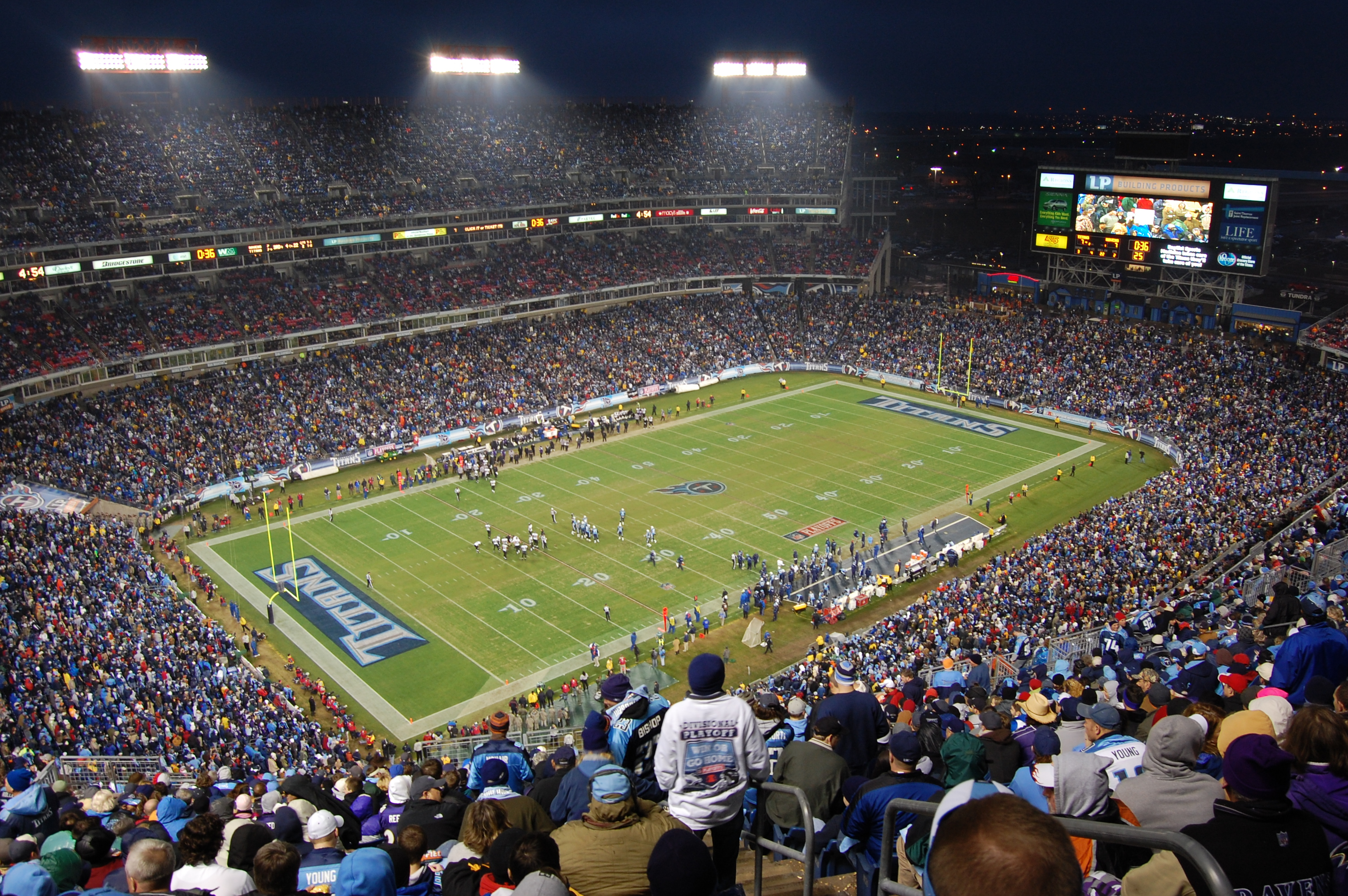
Nissan Stadium during a playoff game against the Baltimore Ravens in January 2009; the visiting Ravens won 13-10

During the 1995 NFL preseason, the Houston Oilers faced the Washington Redskins in mid-August at Neyland Stadium in Knoxville, Tennessee. At the game, Oilers owner Bud Adams met Nashville Mayor Phil Bredesen and began discussing the possibility of moving the team to Middle Tennessee due to Adams' discontent with the team's lease at the Astrodome and unwillingness of the City of Houston to build a new football-only stadium. Later that year, Adams and Bredesen announced the team's intent to move to Nashville. The city and team decided to locate a stadium on the eastern bank of the Cumberland River across from downtown Nashville, in what had been a declining industrial/warehousing area.

In a special referendum on May 7, 1996, voters in Metropolitan Nashville/Davidson County voted to approve partial funding of the proposed stadium. The vote, which allocated $144 million of public money to the project, passed with a 59 percent majority. The pro-stadium organization, known as "NFL Yes!", outspent the anti-stadium group by a ratio of 16:1 during the campaign.

The funds would initially be raised through an increase in the Metro water tax. Much of the remaining construction costs were funded through the sale of personal seat licenses. Some money from the State of Tennessee was allocated to the project, on the condition that the Tennessee State University football team move its home games there, and with the request that the incoming NFL team be named Tennessee instead of Nashville.

The stadium's construction was delayed when the construction site was hit by a tornado that struck downtown Nashville on April 16, 1998, and destroyed several cranes, but the stadium opened in time for the first scheduled event.

The first regular season Titans game at the stadium took place on September 12, 1999, where the Titans defeated the Cincinnati Bengals 36–35.

On May 3, 2010, the stadium's playing surface was filled with 6 feet (1.8 m) of water due to the heavy rains and flooding from the Cumberland River. The flood also reached down to the locker rooms of the stadium.

The stadium received upgrades during mid-2012. Among the improvements are a new sound system, high-speed elevators to the upper levels, and LED ribbon boards mounted on the faces of the upper mezzanines. Two new HD Lighthouse brand LED video displays measuring 157 feet (48 m) by 54 feet (16 m) were installed, replacing the entire end zone scoreboard apparatuses. At the time of installation, the two boards became the second-largest displays in the National Football League (trailing only AT&T Stadium).

The Music City Bowl college football post-season game has been held at Nissan Stadium since 1999. The stadium also hosted college football games on Labor Day weekend: the 2015 Nashville Kickoff Game (Tennessee vs Bowling Green), and the 2026 Music City Kickoff (Louisville vs Ole Miss).

During the 2018 season, two 20th anniversary logos were put in each of the end zones to help celebrate the Titans' 20th year in Nashville. The yard line numbers were also changed to match the number style on the new uniforms.

From 2021 to 2023, IndyCar ran the Music City Grand Prix which used a street track that used streets in Downtown Nashville and around the stadium. The stadium facilities were used for Club seats for the races.

The stadium was the site of the 2022 NHL Stadium Series between the Nashville Predators and the Tampa Bay Lightning.

In February 2022, the Titans paused ongoing renovations to the stadium, citing the rising costs and the structure to explore the possibility of replacing the facility in the near future. They would later commit to a full replacement in late 2022, releasing renderings for a new Nissan Stadium, which will open in 2027.

On July 1, 2023, the stadium hosted the Monster Jam World Finals 22.

The final Titans regular season home game at the stadium will be played on January 3, 2027 against the Pittsburgh Steelers.

=== Naming rights ===
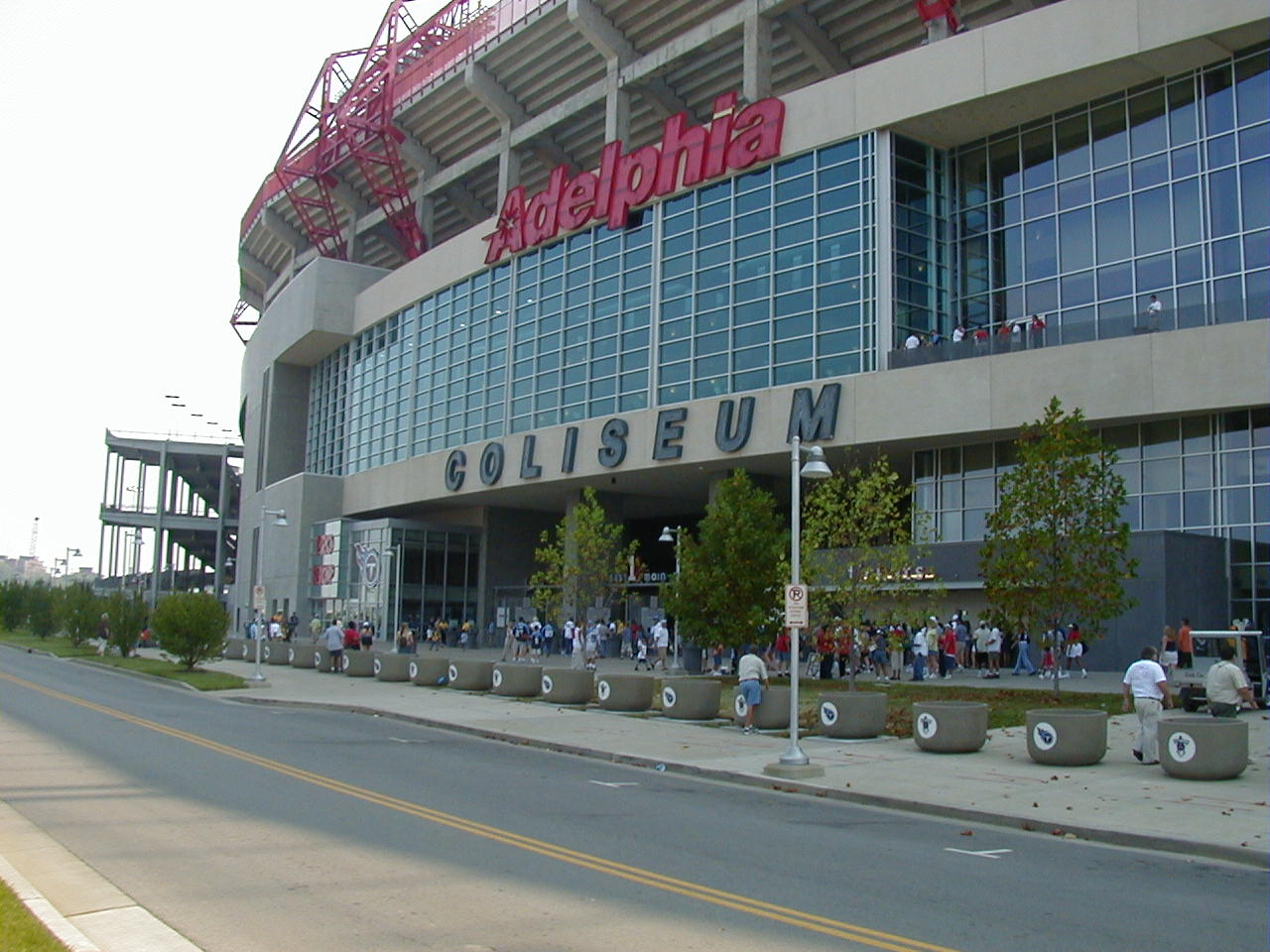
Adelphia Coliseum in 2002, shortly before being renamed to The Coliseum

LP Field logo, 2006–2015

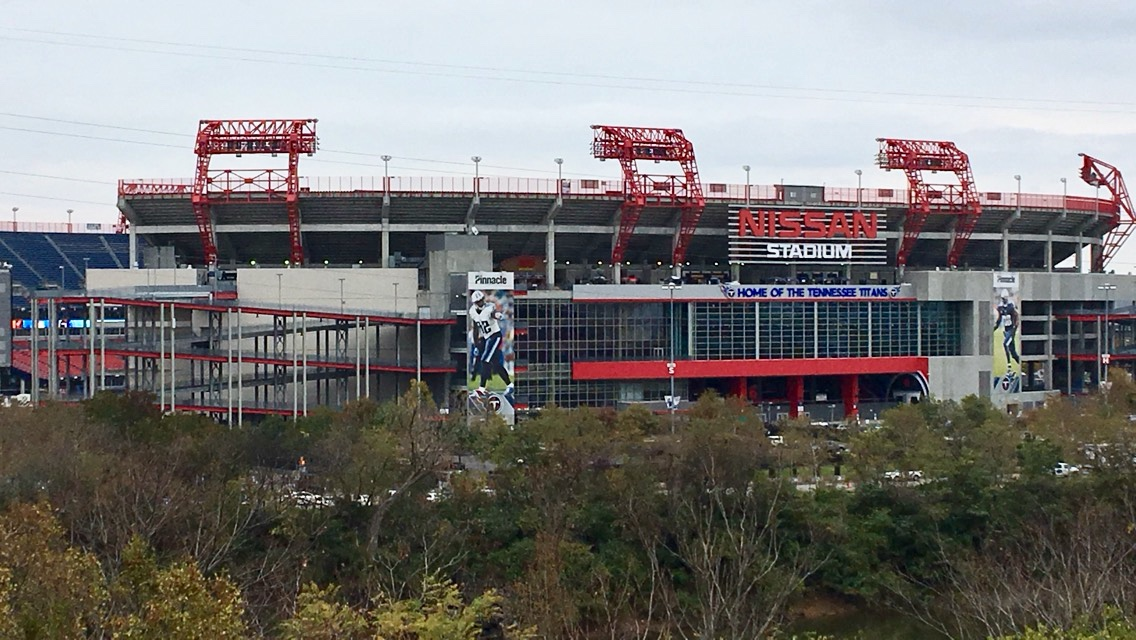
Nissan Stadium in 2017

During its construction, the stadium had no official name, though it was generally referred to as "The East Bank Stadium", a reference to the stadium's location on the eastern bank of the Cumberland River. Upon its completion, it was given the name "Adelphia Coliseum" in a 15-year, $30 million naming rights arrangement with Adelphia Business Solutions, a subsidiary of the larger Adelphia telecommunications company. However, after Adelphia missed a required payment and subsequently filed for bankruptcy in 2002, the agreement was abandoned and the stadium became known simply as "The Coliseum" for four years (Adelphia itself was dissolved in 2006).

A naming rights deal with Nashville-based Louisiana-Pacific was inked on June 6, 2006. Louisiana-Pacific, which markets itself as "LP Building Products", paid $30 million over 10 years for naming rights. LP's influence inside the stadium led to the creation of the LP Building Zones in 2007, located beneath the giant scoreboards from Daktronics at the north and south ends of the stadium. The concession stands and restrooms in these two areas were decorated to look like suburban homes using LP products.

On June 24, 2015, car manufacturer Nissan, which has its North American headquarters just south of Nashville in Franklin and operates a large manufacturing plant in nearby Smyrna, and headquartered in Nishi-ku, Yokohama, Japan, bought the naming rights for the stadium in a 20-year contract, rebranding the stadium as Nissan Stadium. As part of the sponsor agreement, a 2016 Nissan Titan pickup truck was placed next to the stadium scoreboard.

== Tennessee Titans ==
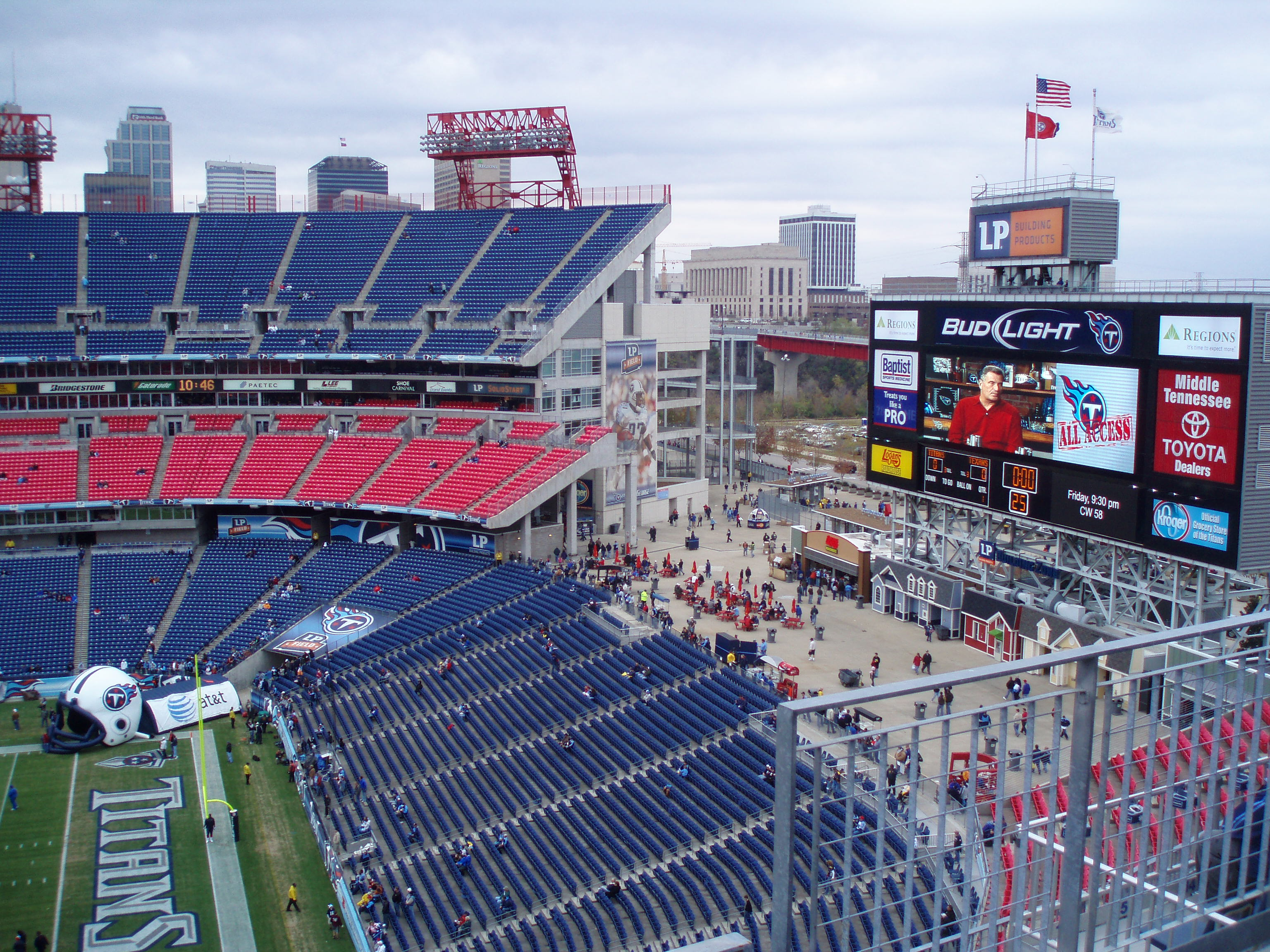
Downtown Nashville as viewed from the upper decks of Nissan Stadium

The Tennessee Titans began playing at Nissan Stadium in 1999, winning their first 13 games before losing to the Baltimore Ravens on November 12, 2000.

=== Music City Miracle ===
On January 8, 2000, one of the most memorable and debated plays in NFL history took place at then-Adelphia Coliseum. The "Music City Miracle" (as it has come to be known) was a last-minute trick play on a kickoff return that resulted in a touchdown and catapulted the Titans past the Buffalo Bills to the Divisional Playoffs. It also ensured that the Titans would go undefeated in the first season in the team's new home. The victory was seen in front of a franchise-record crowd.

== Soccer ==
Nissan Stadium regularly hosts soccer matches featuring the United States men's national team as well as by the women's national team and visiting professional clubs. The venue was first used for soccer on April 20, 2004, in an exhibition game between the Los Angeles Galaxy of Major League Soccer and Tecos UAG of the Mexican Primera División. Since then Nissan Stadium has been used for friendly matches by the U.S. women versus Canada in 2004, a return of Tecos against rival F.C. Atlas in 2005, and the U.S. men versus Morocco in 2006. The stadium helped host the CONCACAF men's 2008 and 2012 qualifying tournaments for the 2008 and 2012 Summer Olympics.

On April 1, 2009, the U.S. men's national team played a World Cup qualifier beating Trinidad and Tobago, 3–0. The match saw Jozy Altidore become the youngest American to score a hat trick for the national team. The U.S. men returned March 29, 2011 falling to Paraguay in a friendly before a record crowd of 29,059 – the largest to attend a soccer game in the state of Tennessee.

Nissan Stadium was chosen for two games of the Group Stage for the 2017 CONCACAF Gold Cup.

The record crowd for a soccer game played in Tennessee is 56,232 and was set on July 29, 2017, when English Premier League clubs Manchester City and Tottenham played an exhibition match at Nissan Stadium.

Major League Soccer club Nashville SC began temporarily playing at the stadium in 2020, their first game on February 29 being a 1–2 loss against Atlanta United FC in front of 59,069 fans. Their final game there was on November 23, 2021, during the first round of playoffs, where they won 3–1 against Orlando City SC in front of 26,043 fans. Afterwards, the team moved to Geodis Park at the Nashville Fairgrounds.

Date	Winning Team	Result	Losing Team	Tournament	Spectators
July 3, 2004	United States women	1–0	Canada women	Women's Friendly	N/A
May 23, 2006	Morocco	1–0	United States	Friendly	26,141
March 20, 2008	Honduras	0–0 (6–5 pen.)	Guatemala	2008 CONCACAF Men's Pre-Olympic Tournament Semifinals	13,201
March 20, 2008	United States	3–0	Canada	2008 CONCACAF Men's Pre-Olympic Tournament Semifinals	13,201
March 23, 2008	Canada	0–0 (5–3 pen.)	Guatemala	2008 CONCACAF Men's Pre-Olympic Tournament Third place match	12,663
April 1, 2009	United States	3–0	Trinidad and Tobago	2010 FIFA World Cup qualification – CONCACAF fourth round	27,959
March 29, 2011	Paraguay	1–0	United States	Friendly	29,059
March 22, 2012	El Salvador	0–0	Canada	2012 CONCACAF Men's Olympic Qualifying Championship Group A	4,269
March 22, 2012	United States	6–0	Cuba	2012 CONCACAF Men's Olympic Qualifying Championship Group A	4,269
March 24, 2012	El Salvador	4–0	Canada	2012 CONCACAF Men's Olympic Qualifying Championship Group A	10,578
March 24, 2012	Canada	2–0	United States	2012 CONCACAF Men's Olympic Qualifying Championship Group A	10,578
March 26, 2012	Canada	1–1	Cuba	2012 CONCACAF Men's Olympic Qualifying Championship Group A	7,889
March 26, 2012	United States	3–3	El Salvador	2012 CONCACAF Men's Olympic Qualifying Championship Group A	7,889
February 13, 2013	United States women	3–1	Scotland women	Women's Friendly	14,224
July 3, 2015	United States	4–0	Guatemala	Friendly	44,835
March 6, 2016	United States women	1–0	France women	2016 SheBelieves Cup	25,363
March 6, 2016	Germany women	2–1	England women	2016 SheBelieves Cup	25,363
October 8, 2016	Mexico	2–1	New Zealand	Friendly	40,287
July 8, 2017	United States	1–1	Panama	2017 CONCACAF Gold Cup Group B	47,622
July 8, 2017	Martinique	2–0	Nicaragua	2017 CONCACAF Gold Cup Group B	47,622
July 29, 2017	(England) Manchester City	3–0	(England) Tottenham Hotspur	2017 International Champions Cup	56,232
September 11, 2018	United States	1–0	Mexico	Friendly	40,194
March 2, 2019	Japan women	3–1	Brazil women	2019 SheBelieves Cup	12,586
March 2, 2019	United States women	2–2	England women	2019 SheBelieves Cup	22,125
July 3, 2019	United States	3–1	Jamaica	2019 CONCACAF Gold Cup Semifinal	28,473
June 30, 2021	Mexico	3–0	Panama	Friendly	30,386
September 5, 2021	United States	1–1	Canada	2022 FIFA World Cup qualification – CONCACAF third round	43,028

== Concerts and events ==
Nissan Stadium can also serve as a large concert venue. The main stage for the annual CMA Fest, held every June, is located in the stadium.

Date	Artist	Opening act(s)	Tour / Concert name	Attendance	Revenue	Notes
April 30, 2000	George Strait	Tim McGraw; Martina McBride; Kenny Chesney; Mark Chestnut; Asleep at the Wheel	Nokia Presents The Chevy Truck Country Music Festival	—N/a	—N/a	First concert to be held at the stadium.
May 14, 2000	NSYNC	P!nk; Sisqo	No Strings Attached Tour	—N/a	—N/a	-
July 8, 2006	Kenny Chesney	Dierks Bentley; Big & Rich; Little Big Town; Gretchen Wilson	The Road and the Radio Tour	47,699 / 47,699	$2,681,562	Guest appearances by Keith Urban & Uncle Kracker.
July 5, 2008	Kenny Chesney	Keith Urban; Sammy Hagar; LeAnn Rimes; Gary Allan	The Poets and Pirates Tour	50,422 / 50,422	$3,251,084	-
June 23, 2012	Kenny Chesney; Tim McGraw	Grace Potter and the Nocturnals; Jake Owen	Brothers of the Sun Tour	49,869 / 52,332	$3,622,116	-
August 19, 2014	One Direction	5 Seconds of Summer	Where We Are Tour	53,472 / 53,472	$4,286,308	-
June 17, 2015	The Rolling Stones	Brad Paisley	Zip Code Tour	47,242 / 47,242	$8,416,049	-
July 9, 2016	Guns N' Roses	Chris Stapleton	Not in This Lifetime... Tour	41,580 / 51,889	$4,385,263	Guest appearance by original drummer Steven Adler, for songs My Michelle & Out Ta Get Me.
October 2, 2016	Beyoncé	DJ Khaled	The Formation World Tour	43,013 / 43,013	$5,182,345	Originally scheduled to take place on May 5, 2016, but was rescheduled for unknown reasons. First female to headline Nissan Stadium.
August 11, 2018	Kenny Chesney	Thomas Rhett; Old Dominion; Brandon Lay	Trip Around the Sun Tour	55,182 / 55,182	$5,471,438	Guest appearance by David Lee Murphy.
August 25, 2018	Taylor Swift	Camila Cabello; Charli XCX	Reputation Stadium Tour	56,112 / 56,112	$9,007,179	Guest appearances by Tim McGraw & Faith Hill.
October 6, 2018	Ed Sheeran	Snow Patrol; Lauv	÷ Tour	45,888 / 45,888	$3,954,931	-
May 25, 2019	Eric Church	—N/a	Double Down Tour	56,521 / 56,521	$5,800,000	-
October 9, 2021	The Rolling Stones	Ghost Hounds	No Filter Tour	42,964 / 42,964	$8,947,952	First concert to be held at the stadium since the onset of the COVID-19 pandemic. Originally scheduled to take place on May 20, 2020, but was rescheduled due to the COVID-19 pandemic. The show was dedicated to Charlie Watts, who died August 24, 2021.
April 15, 2022	Garth Brooks	—N/a	The Garth Brooks Stadium Tour	74,536 / 104,000	$6,457,378	Billed as "A brand-new opening night". Second show added to allow those who had good seats at the July 31, 2021 show to have another chance to get good seats.
April 16, 2022	Garth Brooks	Grand Ole Opry	The Garth Brooks Stadium Tour	74,536 / 104,000	$6,457,378	Originally scheduled to take place on July 31, 2021, but was postponed due to severe weather then later cancelled due to the COVID-19 pandemic. First artist to perform two consecutive shows at Nissan Stadium.
May 28, 2022	Kenny Chesney	Dan + Shay; Old Dominion; Carly Pearce	Here and Now Tour	57,211 / 57,211	$6,833,834	Originally scheduled as the Chillaxification Tour with openers, Florida Georgia Line, Old Dominion, Michael Franti & Spearhead. The show was set to take place on June 27, 2020, then was rescheduled to May 15, 2021, and was again rescheduled to May 28, 2022, due to the COVID-19 pandemic. Guest appearance by at Kelsea Ballerini.
June 30, 2022	Mötley Crüe; Def Leppard	Joan Jett & The Blackhearts; Classless Act	The Stadium Tour	42,215 / 42,215	$5,424,623	Originally scheduled to take place on June 29, 2020, rescheduled to June 19, 2021, but was again rescheduled due to the COVID-19 pandemic. Poison was forced to cancel their performance due to frontman Bret Michaels' hospitalization.
August 12, 2022	Red Hot Chili Peppers	The Strokes; Thundercat	Red Hot Chili Peppers 2022 Global Stadium Tour	41,639 / 41,639	$5,463,821	-
October 2, 2022	Elton John	—N/a	Farewell Yellow Brick Road	48,368 / 48,368	$7,700,419	-
April 14, 2023	Luke Combs	Riley Green; Mitchell Tenpenny; Flatland Country; Brent Cobb	Luke Combs World Tour	95,031 / 118,389	$9,187,136	Second show added.
April 15, 2023	Luke Combs	Riley Green; Lainey Wilson; Flatland Country; Brent Cobb	Luke Combs World Tour	95,031 / 118,389	$9,187,136	-
May 5, 2023	Taylor Swift	Phoebe Bridgers; Gracie Abrams	The Eras Tour	211,924 / 211,924	—N/a	Second show added.
May 6, 2023	Taylor Swift	Phoebe Bridgers; Gayle	The Eras Tour	211,924 / 211,924	—N/a	-
May 7, 2023	Taylor Swift	—N/a	The Eras Tour	211,924 / 211,924	—N/a	Third show added due to "unprecedented demand". First artist to perform three consecutive shows at Nissan Stadium. The May 7th show set the single day attendance record at the time. Opening acts were cut due to rain delay.
May 19, 2023	Billy Joel; Stevie Nicks	—N/a	Two Icons, One Night	49,944 / 49,944	$11,281,469	-
July 15, 2023	Beyoncé	—N/a	Renaissance World Tour	44,742 / 44,742	$9,412,176	-
July 22, 2023	Ed Sheeran	Khalid; Cat Burns	+–=÷x Tour	73,874 / 73,874	$6,227,586	Single day attendance record.
July 28, 2023	George Strait	Chris Stapleton; Little Big Town	Stadium Tour	103,053 / 103,053	$31,692,656	-
July 29, 2023	George Strait	Chris Stapleton; Little Big Town	Stadium Tour	103,053 / 103,053	$31,692,656	Second show added due to overwhelming demand in presale for the first show. The show was cut short after an hour due to severe weather.
May 2, 2024	Morgan Wallen	Bailey Zimmerman; Nate Smith; Lauren Watkins	One Night At A Time 2024	153,145 / 153,145	—N/a	-
May 3, 2024	Morgan Wallen	Bailey Zimmerman; Nate Smith; Lauren Watkins	One Night At A Time 2024	153,145 / 153,145	—N/a	Two shows added.
May 4, 2024	Morgan Wallen	Bailey Zimmerman; Nate Smith; Lauren Watkins	One Night At A Time 2024	153,145 / 153,145	—N/a	Two shows added.
June 29, 2024	Zach Bryan	Turnpike Troubadours; Levi Turner Haliey Welch	Quittin' Time Tour	49,479 / 49,479	$8,752,402	-
July 20, 2024	Def Leppard; Journey	Steve Miller Band	The Summer Stadium Tour	—N/a	—N/a	-
August 3, 2024	Kenny Chesney	Zac Brown Band; Megan Moroney; Uncle Kracker	Sun Goes Down Tour	57,523 / 57,523	$7,289,069	-
October 19, 2024	Post Malone	—N/a	F-1 Trillion Tour	46,386 / 46,386	$6,727,554	-
May 1, 2025	Metallica	Pantera; Suicidal Tendencies	M72 World Tour	—N/a	—N/a	-
May 3, 2025	Metallica	Limp Bizkit; Ice Nine Kills	M72 World Tour	—N/a	—N/a	The show was delayed due to heavy rain in the area.
May 21, 2025	AC/DC	The Pretty Reckless	PWR/UP Tour	—N/a	—N/a	Originally scheduled to take place on May 20, 2025, the show was postponed to May 21, 2025, due to inclement weather.
July 22, 2025	Coldplay	Ayra Starr; Elyanna	Music of the Spheres Tour	55,663 / 55,663	$6,514,557	-
August 12, 2025	The Weeknd	Playboi Carti; Mike Dean	After Hours til Dawn Tour	46,930 / 46,930	$5,361,232	-
May 6, 2026	Bruno Mars	DJ Pee .Wee; Leon Thomas	The Romantic Tour	—N/a	—N/a	-
May 23, 2026	Chris Stapleton	Lainey Wilson; Allen Stone	All-American Road Show	—N/a	—N/a	-
June 20, 2026	Ed Sheeran	Myles Smith; Amble; Aaron Rowe	Loop Tour	—N/a	—N/a	-
June 27, 2026	Alan Jackson	—N/a	One More for the Road... The Finale	56,109 / 56,109	$34,728,554	The highest-grossing concert by any artist in history.
June 30, 2026	Post Malone	Carter Faith	Big Ass Stadium Tour	—N/a	—N/a	-
July 25, 2026	Usher; Chris Brown	—N/a	The R&B Tour	—N/a	—N/a	-
August 13, 2026	My Chemical Romance	Pierce the Veil	The Black Parade 2026	—N/a	—N/a	-
August 15, 2026	Foo Fighters	Queens of the Stone Age; Mannequin Pussy	Take Cover Tour	—N/a	—N/a	Final concert hosted at Nissan Stadium.

=== Professional wrestling ===
Nissan Stadium hosted SummerSlam in 2022.

== See also ==
- List of current National Football League stadiums
- List of NCAA Division I FCS football stadiums

Events and tenants
Preceded by Vanderbilt Stadium	Home of the Tennessee Titans; 1999 – present	Succeeded by current
Preceded by Vanderbilt Stadium	Home of the Music City Bowl; 1999 – present	Succeeded by current
Preceded by Hale Stadium	Home of the Tennessee State Tigers; 1999 – present	Succeeded by current
Preceded by First Tennessee Park	Home of Nashville SC; 2020 – 2022	Succeeded by Geodis Park
Preceded by AT&T Stadium; 2018	Venues of the NFL Draft; 2019	Succeeded by FirstEnergy Stadium; 2021
