= Everywhere We Go =

Studio album by Kenny Chesney
- Released: March 2, 1999
- Recorded: 1998–1999
- Genre: Country
- Length: 40:59
- Label: BNA
- Producers: Buddy Cannon; Norro Wilson

Kenny Chesney chronology
| I Will Stand (1997) | Everywhere We Go (1999) | Greatest Hits (2000) |

Singles from Everywhere We Go
- 1. "How Forever Feels" Released: December 7, 1998; 2. "You Had Me from Hello" Released: April 19, 1999; 3. "She Thinks My Tractor's Sexy" Released: October 4, 1999; 4. "What I Need to Do" Released: January 31, 2000

Professional ratings
Review scores
| Source | Rating |
|---|---|
| Allmusic | 2/5 stars |

Everywhere We Go is the fifth studio album by American country music singer Kenny Chesney. It was released on March 2, 1999, via BNA Records. The first in his career to be certified double platinum for sales of two million copies, it produced four singles with "How Forever Feels", "You Had Me from Hello", "She Thinks My Tractor's Sexy", and "What I Need to Do". The first two singles were Number One hits on the Billboard country charts and were also Kenny's first Top 40 hits on the US Billboard Hot 100 chart, "She Thinks My Tractor's Sexy" was a number 11 hit on that same chart, and "What I Need to Do" a number eight. The singles "You Had Me from Hello" and "She Thinks My Tractor's Sexy" were both certified gold by the Recording Industry Association of America (RIAA). This was Chesney's first album to feature a crossover-friendly country-pop sound, which was a departure from his earlier neotraditional country albums.

== Track listing ==
| No. | Title | Writer(s) | Length |
|---|---|---|---|
| 1. | "What I Need to Do" | Tom Damphier, Bill Luther | 4:05 |
| 2. | "How Forever Feels" | Wendell Mobley, Tony Mullins | 3:08 |
| 3. | "You Had Me from Hello" | Kenny Chesney, Skip Ewing | 3:51 |
| 4. | "Kiss Me, Kiss Me, Kiss Me" | Brett James | 4:02 |
| 5. | "Life Is Good" | Jeff Stevens, Steve Bogard | 3:25 |
| 6. | "Everywhere We Go" | Paul Overstreet, Billy Aerts | 3:06 |
| 7. | "She Thinks My Tractor's Sexy" | Overstreet, Jim Collins | 4:08 |
| 8. | "California" | Chris Lindsey, Bill Luther, Aimee Mayo | 3:53 |
| 9. | "Baptism" (featuring Randy Travis) | Mickey Cates | 4:15 |
| 10. | "A Woman Knows" | Chesney, Overstreet, Don Sampson | 3:41 |
| 11. | "I Might Get Over You" | Ewing, Kent Blazy | 3:25 |
| Total length: | | | 40:59 |

== Personnel ==
As listed in liner notes.

- Eddie Bayers – drums
- Wyatt Beard – background vocals
- Shannon Brown – background vocals
- Larry Byrom – acoustic guitar
- Buddy Cannon – bass guitar, background vocals
- Kenny Chesney – acoustic guitar, lead vocals
- J. T. Corenflos – electric guitar
- Dan Dugmore – steel guitar
- Larry Franklin – fiddle, mandolin
- Sonny Garrish – steel guitar
- Steve Gibson – electric guitar, six string bass
- Rob Hajacos – fiddle
- John Hobbs – piano
- Rick Holt – Dobro
- Paul Leim – drums
- B. James Lowry – electric guitar, acoustic guitar, gut string guitar
- Randy McCormick – synthesizer
- Liana Manis – background vocals
- Brent Mason – electric guitar
- Steve Nathan – piano, synthesizer
- Louis Dean Nunley – background vocals
- Bobby Ogdin – piano, synthesizer
- Sean Paddock – drums
- Larry Paxton – bass guitar
- Gary Prim – piano
- Melonie Cannon – background vocals
- John Wesley Ryles – background vocals
- Randy Travis – duet vocals on "Baptism"
- Cindy Richardson-Walker – background vocals
- Bergen White – background vocals
- Kristin Wilkinson – string arrangements & conductor
- Dennis Wilson – background vocals
- Curtis "Mr. Harmony" Young – background vocals

Strings contracted by the Nashville String Machine, Carl Gorodetzky

== Charts ==
=== Weekly charts ===
| Chart (1999) | Peak position |
|---|---|
| Canadian Country Albums (RPM) | 5 |
| US Billboard 200 | 51 |
| US Top Country Albums (Billboard) | 5 |

=== Year-end charts ===
| Chart (1999) | Position |
|---|---|
| US Billboard 200 | 150 |
| US Top Country Albums (Billboard) | 13 |

=== Singles ===
| Year | Single | Peak chart positions | | | Certifications (sales threshold) |
| Year | Single | US Country | US | CAN Country | Certifications (sales threshold) |
|---|---|---|---|---|---|
| 1998 | "How Forever Feels" | 1 | 27 | 1 | US: Platinum |
| 1999 | "You Had Me from Hello" | 1 | 34 | 1 | US: Platinum |
| 1999 | "She Thinks My Tractor's Sexy" | 11 | 66 | 20 | US: 2× Platinum |
| 2000 | "What I Need to Do" | 8 | 56 | 13 | |

== Certifications ==
| Region | Certification | Certified units/sales |
|---|---|---|
| Canada (Music Canada) | Gold | 50,000^{^} |
| United States (RIAA) | 2× Platinum | 2,000,000^{^} |
^{^} Shipments figures based on certification alone.
