= Here and Now Tour (Kenny Chesney) =

2022 concert tour by Kenny Chesney

- Tour by Kenny Chesney
- Associated album: Here and Now
- Start date: April 23, 2022
- End date: August 27, 2022
- Legs: 1
- No. of shows: 41 in North America

Kenny Chesney concert chronology
- Songs for the Saints Tour (2019); Here and Now Tour (2022)

The Here and Now Tour (originally known as the Chillaxification Tour) was the sixteenth headlining concert tour by American country music recording artist, Kenny Chesney. The tour is in support of his nineteenth studio album, Here and Now (2020). Pre-dominantly visiting the United States, there are 41 shows planned during the spring and summer of 2022.

== Background ==
Original poster for dates planned for 2020

The tour was announced in September 2019, with 20 shows planned for stadiums in the spring and summer of 2020. Country acts Florida Georgia Line and Old Dominion were slated as support acts for the tour. Later in December 2019, the tour expanded, adding an additional 18 shows to be performed in amphitheaters. For these shows, Michael Franti & Spearhead were announced as the opening act.

The COVID-19 pandemic took a heavy toll on the live entertainment industry. In March 2020, Chesney postponed the tour to begin at the end of May 2020. A few months later, The Messina Touring Group announced all dates were postponed. Chesney wrote to his fan base (the No Shoes Nation) postponing all dates was a late resort. The singer also mentioned meeting with his team, MTG, medical experts, city commissioners, venue management, and the NFL daily to make the tour happen in 2020.

Later that summer, postponed shows were rescheduled. The tour was set to start in April 2021, with the new country group Gone West added as a support act. However, as the effects of the pandemic increased, the tour was postponed once again.

A year later, Chesney revealed the tour will finally take place in 2022. The singer also renamed the tour. Its full title with sponsorship is "Blue Chair Bay Rum Presents Here And Now 2022 Fueled by Marathon". As of July 2021, there are no support acts that have been announced for the new dates.

Speaking of the tour, Chesney stated:

"Like it does for everyone, the idea of music, live music, fills me up [...] Nothing is so in the moment, so completely alive. I want to start 2022 with the awesome rush that embodies everything playing for No Shoes Nation is. We're calling the tour Here And Now 2022, because when we get together, there is only the present – and it's so electric and good, I know I don't want it to end. I just want to be 100% there with all of you."

On February 7, 2022, Chesney announced 20 amphitheater to coincide with the 21 stadium dates.

Following the tour, Pollstar reported Chesney had broken 14 personal ticket sales records, and in many markets had to push the stage further into the end zone to accommodate the demand for tickets.

== Tour dates ==
List of concerts, showing date, city, country, venue, opening acts, tickets sold, number of available tickets and amount of gross revenue
Date	City	Country	Venue	Opening acts	Attendance / Capacity	Revenue
North America
April 23, 2022	Tampa	United States	Raymond James Stadium	Dan + Shay; Old Dominion; Carly Pearce	58,369 / 58,369	$8,605,328
April 30, 2022	Charlotte	United States	Bank of America Stadium	Dan + Shay; Old Dominion; Carly Pearce	41,342 / 42,489	$4,327,462
May 5, 2022	Noblesville	United States	Ruoff Music Center	Carly Pearce	15,376 / 20,000	$948,508
May 7, 2022	St. Louis	United States	Busch Stadium	Dan + Shay; Old Dominion; Carly Pearce	40,653 / 40,653	$4,147,274
May 14, 2022	Milwaukee	United States	American Family Field	Dan + Shay; Old Dominion; Carly Pearce	41,138 / 41,138	$5,459,692
May 19, 2022	Orange Beach	United States	Wharf Amphitheater	Carly Pearce	9,551 / 9,551	$1,097,048
May 21, 2022	Atlanta	United States	Mercedes-Benz Stadium	Dan + Shay Old Dominion; Carly Pearce	47,925 / 47,925	$4,902,829
May 25, 2022	Charleston	United States	Credit One Stadium	Carly Pearce	11,803 / 11,803	$1,219,816
May 26, 2022	Huntsville	United States	Orion Amphitheater	Carly Pearce	7,384 / 7,384	$907,117
May 28, 2022	Nashville	United States	Nissan Stadium	Dan + Shay; Old Dominion; Carly Pearce	57,211 / 57,211	$6,833,834
June 2, 2022	The Woodlands	United States	Cynthia Woods Mitchell Pavilion	Carly Pearce	14,375 / 14,375	$884,954
June 4, 2022	Arlington	United States	AT&T Stadium	Dan + Shay; Old Dominion; Carly Pearce	50,033 / 50,033	$4,588,994
June 8, 2022	Canandaigua	United States	CMAC	Carly Pearce	11,569 / 11,569	$750,924
June 9, 2022	Cuyahoga Falls	United States	Blossom Music Center	Carly Pearce	19,933 / 19,933	$1,080,994
June 11, 2022	Pittsburgh	United States	Heinz Field	Dan + Shay; Old Dominion; Carly Pearce	53,502 / 53,502	$5,569,182
June 15, 2022	Virginia Beach	United States	Veterans United Home Loans Amphitheater	Carly Pearce	16,324 / 16,324	$970,030
June 16, 2022	Bristow	United States	Jiffy Lube Live	Carly Pearce	18,114 / 18,114	$903,466
June 18, 2022	Philadelphia	United States	Lincoln Financial Field	Dan + Shay; Old Dominion; Carly Pearce	55,519 / 55,519	$7,047,085
June 23, 2022	Cincinnati	United States	Riverbend Music Center	Carly Pearce	20,336 / 20,336	$1,196,358
June 25, 2022	Chicago	United States	Soldier Field	Dan + Shay; Old Dominion; Carly Pearce	52,792 / 52,792	$6,054,015
June 29, 2022	Brandon	United States	Brandon Amphitheater	Carly Pearce	6,822 / 6,822	$571,924
June 30, 2022	Rogers	United States	Walmart Arkansas Music Pavilion	Carly Pearce	9,064 / 10,876	$777,117
July 2, 2022	Kansas City	United States	GEHA Field	Dan + Shay; Old Dominion; Carly Pearce	57,852 / 57,852	$5,231,690
July 9, 2022	Bozeman	United States	Bobcat Stadium	Old Dominion; Carly Pearce	25,469 / 25,469	$2,742,481
July 12, 2022	Stateline	United States	Lake Tahoe Outdoor Arena	Carly Pearce	14,558 / 14,558	$1,729,241
July 13, 2022	Stateline	United States	Lake Tahoe Outdoor Arena	Carly Pearce	14,558 / 14,558	$1,729,241
July 16, 2022	Seattle	United States	Lumen Field	Dan + Shay; Old Dominion; Carly Pearce	50,983 / 50,983	$5,101,650
July 19, 2022	Bend	United States	Hayden Homes Amphitheater	Carly Pearce	13,742 / 15,660	$1,402,468
July 20, 2022	Bend	United States	Hayden Homes Amphitheater	Carly Pearce	13,742 / 15,660	$1,402,468
July 23, 2022	Inglewood	United States	SoFi Stadium	Dan + Shay; Old Dominion; Carly Pearce	50,227 / 50,227	$5,467,968
July 27, 2022	Nampa	United States	Ford Idaho Center Amphitheater	Carly Pearce	10,898 / 10,898	$728,537
July 28, 2022	West Valley City	United States	USANA Amphitheatre	Carly Pearce	18,224 / 19,958	$1,189,152
July 30, 2022	Denver	United States	Empower Field at Mile High	Dan + Shay; Old Dominion; Carly Pearce	60,023 / 60,023	$6,535,578
August 6, 2022	Minneapolis	United States	U.S. Bank Stadium	Dan + Shay; Old Dominion; Carly Pearce	50,150 / 50,150	$5,996,445
August 10, 2022	Columbia	United States	Merriweather Post Pavilion	Carly Pearce	15,000 / 15,000	$1,316,917
August 11, 2022	Geddes	United States	St. Joseph's Health Amphitheater at Lakeview	Carly Pearce	14,876 / 17,136	$1,316,917
August 13, 2022	East Rutherford	United States	MetLife Stadium	Dan + Shay; Old Dominion; Carly Pearce	59,999 / 59,999	$7,267,540
August 18, 2022	Columbus	United States	Historic Crew Stadium	Dan + Shay; Old Dominion; Carly Pearce	23,197 / 23,197	$2,214,103
August 20, 2022	Detroit	United States	Ford Field	Dan + Shay; Old Dominion; Carly Pearce	49,725 / 49,725	$5,622,738
August 26, 2022	Foxborough	United States	Gillette Stadium	Dan + Shay; Old Dominion; Carly Pearce	122,021 / 122,021	$12,968,004
August 27, 2022	Foxborough	United States	Gillette Stadium	Dan + Shay; Old Dominion; Carly Pearce	122,021 / 122,021	$12,968,004
Total					1,296,079 / 1,309,574	$135,259,120

Cancellations and rescheduled shows

April 18, 2020	Arlington, Texas	AT&T Stadium	Rescheduled to August 7, 2021
April 25, 2020	Milwaukee, Wisconsin	Miller Park	Rescheduled to May 8, 2021
May 2, 2020	Minneapolis, Minnesota	U.S. Bank Stadium	Rescheduled to June 5, 2021
May 7, 2020	West Palm Beach, Florida	iTHINK Financial Amphitheatre	Postponed due to COVID-19 pandemic
May 9, 2020	Tampa, Florida	Raymond James Stadium	Rescheduled to May 1, 2021
May 13, 2020	Southaven, Mississippi	BankPlus Amphitheater	Postponed due to COVID-19 pandemic
May 14, 2020	Brandon, Mississippi	Brandon Amphitheater	Postponed due to COVID-19 pandemic
May 16, 2020	Atlanta, Georgia	Mercedes-Benz Stadium	Rescheduled to May 22, 2021
May 20, 2020	Houston, Texas	Minute Maid Park	Postponed due to COVID-19 pandemic
May 23, 2020	San Antonio, Texas	Alamodome	Postponed due to COVID-19 pandemic
May 28, 2020	Cuyahoga Falls, Ohio	Blossom Music Center	Postponed due to COVID-19 pandemic
May 30, 2020	Pittsburgh, Pennsylvania	Heinz Field	Rescheduled to June 12, 2021
June 4, 2020	Raleigh, North Carolina	Coastal Credit Union Music Park	Postponed due to COVID-19 pandemic
June 6, 2020	Philadelphia, Pennsylvania	Lincoln Financial Field	Rescheduled to June 19, 2021
June 11, 2020	Rogers, Arkansas	Walmart Arkansas Music Pavilion	Postponed due to COVID-19 pandemic
June 13, 2020	St. Louis, Missouri	Busch Stadium	Rescheduled to July 10, 2021
June 17, 2020	Virginia Beach, Virginia	Veterans United Home Loans Amphitheater	Postponed due to COVID-19 pandemic
June 18, 2020	Bristow, Virginia	Jiffy Lube Live	Postponed due to COVID-19 pandemic
June 20, 2020	Columbus, Ohio	Ohio Stadium	Cancelled due to COVID-19 pandemic. This concert was a part of the "Buckeye Country Superfest"
June 25, 2020	Charlotte, North Carolina	PNC Music Pavilion	Postponed due to COVID-19 pandemic
June 27, 2020	Nashville, Tennessee	Nissan Stadium	Rescheduled to May 15, 2021
July 2, 2020	Stateline, Nevada	Lake Tahoe Outdoor Arena	Rescheduled to July 12, 2022
July 3, 2020	Stateline, Nevada	Lake Tahoe Outdoor Arena	Rescheduled to July 13, 2022
July 11, 2020	Kansas City, Missouri	Arrowhead Stadium	Rescheduled to May 29, 2021
July 18, 2020	Seattle, Washington	CenturyLink Field	Rescheduled to July 17, 2021
July 23, 2020	Noblesville, Indiana	Ruoff Music Center	Postponed due to COVID-19 pandemic
July 25, 2020	Chicago. Illinois	Soldier Field	Rescheduled to June 26, 2021
July 29, 2020	Albuquerque, New Mexico	Isleta Amphitheater	Postponed due to COVID-19 pandemic
July 30, 2020	Phoenix, Arizona	Ak-Chin Pavilion	Postponed due to COVID-19 pandemic
August 1, 2020	Inglewood, California	SoFi Stadium	Rescheduled to July 24, 2021
August 5, 2020	Nampa, Idaho	Ford Idaho Center Amphitheatre	Postponed due to COVID-19 pandemic
August 6, 2020	West Valley City, Utah	USANA Amphitheatre	Postponed due to COVID-19 pandemic
August 8, 2020	Denver, Colorado	Empower Field	Rescheduled to July 31, 2021
August 15, 2020	Detroit, Michigan	Ford Field	Rescheduled to August 14, 2021
August 20, 2020	Geddes, New York	St. Joseph's Health Amphitheater	Postponed due to COVID-19 pandemic
August 22, 2020	East Rutherford, New Jersey	MetLife Stadium	Rescheduled to August 21, 2021
August 26, 2020	Columbia, Maryland	Merriweather Post Pavilion	Rescheduled to August 10, 2022
August 28, 2020	Foxborough, Massachusetts	Gillette Stadium	Rescheduled to August 27, 2021
May 1, 2021	Tampa, Florida	Raymond James Stadium	Rescheduled to April 23, 2022
May 8, 2021	Milwaukee, Wisconsin	Miller Park	Rescheduled to May 14, 2022
May 15, 2021	Nashville, Tennessee	Nissan Stadium	Rescheduled to May 28, 2022
May 22, 2021	Atlanta, Georgia	Mercedes-Benz Stadium	Rescheduled to May 21, 2022
May 29, 2021	Kansas City, Missouri	Arrowhead Stadium	Rescheduled to July 2, 2022
June 5, 2021	Minneapolis, Minnesota	U.S. Bank Stadium	Rescheduled to August 6, 2022
June 12, 2021	Pittsburgh, Pennsylvania	Heinz Field	Rescheduled to June 11, 2022
June 19, 2021	Philadelphia, Pennsylvania	Lincoln Financial Field	Rescheduled to June 18, 2022
June 26, 2021	Chicago. Illinois	Soldier Field	Rescheduled to June 25, 2022
July 3, 2021	Bozeman, Montana	Bobcat Stadium	Rescheduled to July 9, 2022
July 10, 2021	St. Louis, Missouri	Busch Stadium	Rescheduled to May 7, 2022
July 17, 2021	Seattle, Washington	CenturyLink Field	Rescheduled to July 16, 2022
July 24, 2021	Inglewood, California	SoFi Stadium	Rescheduled to July 23, 2022
July 31, 2021	Denver, Colorado	Empower Field	Rescheduled to July 30, 2022
August 7, 2021	Arlington, Texas	AT&T Stadium	Rescheduled to June 5, 2022
August 14, 2021	Detroit, Michigan	Ford Field	Rescheduled to August 20, 2022
August 21, 2021	East Rutherford, New Jersey	MetLife Stadium	Rescheduled to August 13, 2022
August 27, 2021	Foxborough, Massachusetts	Gillette Stadium	Rescheduled to August 26, 2022
August 28, 2021	Foxborough, Massachusetts	Gillette Stadium	Rescheduled to August 27, 2022

== Band ==
- Kenny Chesney – Lead vocals, guitar
- Wyatt Beard – Keyboards
- Nick Buda - Drums
- Jon Conley - Guitar
- Kenny Greenberg - Guitar
- Harmoni Kelley – Bass
- Danny Rader - Guitar
