= Tip of My Tongue (Kenny Chesney song) =

Single by Kenny Chesney

from the album Here and Now
- Released: July 12, 2019
- Genre: Country pop
- Length: 3:19
- Label: Blue Chair/Warner Nashville
- Songwriter(s): Kenny Chesney; Ross Copperman; Ed Sheeran
- Producer(s): Kenny Chesney; Ross Copperman

Kenny Chesney singles chronology
"Better Boat" (2018)	"Tip of My Tongue" (2019)	"Here and Now" (2020)

"Tip of My Tongue" is a song co-written and recorded by American country music artist Kenny Chesney. It was released in July 2019 as the first single from his 2020 album Here and Now. Chesney wrote this song with songwriter Ross Copperman and English singer Ed Sheeran, and co-produced it with Copperman.

== History and content ==
Chesney announced the song's release in July 2019, as the lead single to an upcoming nineteenth studio album. He wrote the song with Ross Copperman and Ed Sheeran. Of the co-writing process, he told the blog Nash Country Daily that "You start talking, and words fall out, and anything can happen. When you go in and write on any given day, the chemistry is what it is. When the idea fell out, we all just laughed and went, ‘Well, what can we do with that?’" He later added on to the song writing process by saying, "With all the great songs that have been written in this town, I think you always want to do something a little different, I think there’s this moment when you look at someone and you know they contain everything. You want to know everything, consume everything about them. It’s why we say ‘It’s a long way down,’ because you want to know it all. And the best part: We got a melody that feels like what's going on lyrically. The music matches the words, and you can just drift in it"

== Critical reception ==
Taste of Country writer Billy Dukes said that the song is a "mid-tempo, progressive-sounding track [that] places Chesney's familiar voice in a progressive new setting, creating a very contemporary track that has strong pop influences." Jon Freeman of Rolling Stone Country said described the song as "a celebration of sensuality" and said, "Over a dreamy, percussion-free bed of guitar and synthesizer, Chesney sings of his appreciation for the little details — like the dimples in someone’s back — that make him fall a little more in love with someone."

== Commercial performance ==
As of December 2019, the song has sold 85,000 copies in the United States.

== Charts ==
=== Weekly charts ===
Chart (2019–2020)	Peak position
Canada (Canadian Hot 100)	98
Canada Country (Billboard)	3
US Billboard Hot 100	73
US Country Airplay (Billboard)	8
US Hot Country Songs (Billboard)	13
US Rolling Stone Top 100	88

=== Year-end charts ===
Chart (2019)	Position
US Country Airplay (Billboard)	51
US Hot Country Songs (Billboard)	54

Chart (2020)	Position
US Hot Country Songs (Billboard)	84

== Certifications ==
Certifications for "Tip of My Tongue"
Region	Certification	Certified units/sales
Canada (Music Canada)	Gold	40,000^{‡}
United States (RIAA)	Platinum	1,000,000^{‡}
^{‡} Sales+streaming figures based on certification alone.
