= Here and Now (Kenny Chesney album) =

Studio album by Kenny Chesney
- Released: May 1, 2020
- Genre: Country
- Length: 40:56
- Labels: Blue Chair; Warner Nashville
- Producers: Buddy Cannon; Kenny Chesney; Ross Copperman

Kenny Chesney chronology
Songs for the Saints (2018)	Here and Now (2020)	Born (2024)

Singles from Here and Now
- 1. "Tip of My Tongue" Released: July 12, 2019; 2. "Here and Now" Released: February 21, 2020; 3. "Happy Does" Released: July 20, 2020; 4. "Knowing You" Released: March 15, 2021; 5. "Everyone She Knows" Released: February 14, 2022

Here and Now is the nineteenth studio album by American country music singer Kenny Chesney. It was released on May 1, 2020, via Blue Chair Records and Warner Records Nashville. The album includes the singles "Tip of My Tongue", "Here and Now", "Happy Does" "Knowing You’, and “Everyone She Knows.”

== Content ==
Chesney announced the album's title and tracklist in March 2020. At the time of the announcement, the project had already produced two singles: "Tip of My Tongue" and the title track. The album is Chesney's second for Warner Records Nashville. Chesney co-produced the album with longtime producer Buddy Cannon. Of the songwriters chosen for the album, Chesney said that he wanted to "bring a lot of [his] favorite writers together" to tie into the album's central theme of "how different people are around the world, yet how entirely similar they can be".

== Commercial performance ==
On the US Billboard 200, Here and Now debuted at number one, earning 233,000 equivalent album units, comprising 222,000 in album sales, and marking Chesney's 16th top 10 album, as well as the third-biggest sales week of 2020.

== Track listing ==
No.	Title	Writer(s)	Length
1.	"We Do"	Kenny Chesney; Craig Wiseman; David Garcia; Scooter Carusoe	3:26
2.	"Here and Now"	Wiseman; Garcia; David Lee Murphy	2:52
3.	"Everyone She Knows"	Josh Osborne; Ross Copperman; Shane McAnally	3:25
4.	"Wasted"	Bobby Hamrick; Murphy; James T. Slater	3:49
5.	"Knowing You"	Adam James; Brett James; Kat Higgins	3:46
6.	"Heartbreakers"	J. T. Harding; Osborne; Zach Crowell	3:17
7.	"Someone to Fix"	Jon Nite; Carusoe	3:32
8.	"Happy Does"	Brad Clawson; Brock Berryhill; Greylan James; Jamie Paulin	2:49
9.	"Tip of My Tongue"	Chesney; Ed Sheeran; Copperman	3:20
10.	"You Don’t Get To"	Barry Dean; Dustin Christensen; Josh Kerr	3:37
11.	"Beautiful World"	Murphy; Tom Douglas; Tony Lane	3:11
12.	"Guys Named Captain"	Slater	4:03
Total length:			40:56

Deluxe edition bonus tracks
No.	Title	Writer(s)	Length
13.	"Wind On"	Murphy; Rodney Clawson	4:20
14.	"Fields of Glory"	Copperman; Osborne; Ashley Gorley	3:21
15.	"My Anthem"	Jason Gantt; Osborne; McAnally	3:18
16.	"Streets"	Chesney; Douglas	5:05
Total length:			57:00

== Personnel ==
=== Musicians ===
- Wyatt Beard – background vocals (tracks 4, 5, 7, 8, 10)
- Pat Buchanan – electric guitar (tracks 1, 2, 5, 10, 12)
- Tom Bukovac – electric guitar (tracks 1, 3, 5–7, 9–11), acoustic guitar (9)
- Scooter Carusoe – background vocals (track 1)
- Kenny Chesney – lead vocals (all tracks)
- Ross Copperman – electric guitar, programming, background vocals (tracks 3, 9); acoustic guitar, keyboards (3)
- Chad Cromwell – drums (tracks 1, 2, 4–8, 10, 11), tambourine (track 8), programming (track 11)
- Fred Eltringham – drums (track 9)
- David Garcia – background vocals (tracks 1, 4)
- Kenny Greenberg – electric guitar (tracks 1, 2, 4–6, 8, 10, 11)
- Mark Hill – bass guitar (track 9)
- John Hobbs – piano, B-3 organ, Wurlitzer, synthesizer (track 12)
- David Huff – programming (tracks 1, 4)
- Evan Hutchings – drums (track 3)
- Tony Lucido – bass guitar (tracks 1, 3)
- Mac McAnally – acoustic guitar (track 12)
- Carl Miner – acoustic guitar (tracks 6, 11)
- David Lee Murphy – background vocals (tracks 2, 11)
- Josh Osborne – background vocals (track 6)
- Danny Rader – acoustic guitar (tracks 1–5, 7, 8, 11), electric guitar (tracks 2, 7), bouzouki (tracks 3, 4, 7, 8, 11), hi-strung acoustic guitar (tracks 3, 8), ganjo (track 4)
- Jeffrey Roach – keyboards (track 3)
- Michael Rojas – piano (tracks 1, 5, 8, 10, 11), B-3 organ (2, 4, 6, 11), synthesizer (2, 7, 8)
- Ed Sheeran – background vocals (track 9)
- F. Reid Shippen – programming (tracks 3, 5, 8, 9)
- Jimmie Lee Sloas – bass guitar (tracks 2, 5–8, 10, 11)
- Pete Stewart – keyboards, synthesizer (track 9)
- Jeff Taylor – accordion (tracks 11, 12)
- Bobby Terry – steel guitar (track 5)
- John Willis – acoustic guitar (track 10)
- Craig Wiseman – background vocals (track 1)

=== Technical ===
- Luke Armentrout – mastering assistance
- Sean Badum – engineering assistance (tracks 5–7, 11)
- Buddy Cannon – production (tracks 1, 2, 4–8, 10–12)
- Tony Castle – engineering (tracks 1, 4–8, 10–12)
- Taylor Chadwick – mastering assistance
- Kenny Chesney – production
- Ross Copperman – production, additional engineering (tracks 3, 9)
- Andrew Darby – mastering assistance
- Dan Davis – engineering assistance (tracks 3, 9)
- Shannon Finnegan – production coordination (tracks 1, 2, 4–8, 10–12)
- Michelle Freetly – engineering assistance (tracks 1, 2, 5, 10, 12)
- Bobbi Giel – mastering assistance
- Scott Johnson – production coordination (tracks 3, 9)
- Michael Mechling – mixing assistance (all tracks), engineering assistance (tracks 3, 9)
- Andrew Mendelson – mastering
- Buckley Miller – digital editing (tracks 3, 9)
- Jason Mott – engineering assistance (tracks 1, 6, 7, 10–12)
- Zack Pancoast – engineering assistance (tracks 7, 10)
- Lowell Reynolds – engineering assistance (track 4)
- Bryce Roberts – engineering assistance (tracks 2, 4, 6, 8, 11)
- F. Reid Shippen – mixing (all tracks), engineering (tracks 3, 9)
- Brian David Willis – digital editing (tracks 3, 9)

=== Visuals ===
- Danny Clinch – photography
- Mike Moore – art direction, design
- Shane Tarleton – creative direction

== Charts ==
=== Weekly charts ===
Chart performance for Here and Now
Chart (2020)	Peak position
Australian Albums (ARIA)	83
Canadian Albums (Billboard)	2
Swiss Albums (Schweizer Hitparade)	49
US Billboard 200	1
US Top Country Albums (Billboard)	1

=== Year-end charts ===
2020 year-end chart performance for Here and Now
Chart (2020)	Position
US Billboard 200	146
US Top Country Albums (Billboard)	17

2021 year-end chart performance for Here and Now
Chart (2021)	Position
US Top Country Albums (Billboard)	98

== Certifications ==
Region	Certification	Certified units/sales
United States (RIAA)	Gold	500,000^{‡}
^{‡} Sales+streaming figures based on certification alone.

== See also ==
- List of Billboard 200 number-one albums of 2020
