= Everyone She Knows =

Single by Kenny Chesney

from the album Here and Now
- Released: February 14, 2022
- Genre: Country
- Length: 3:25
- Label: Blue Chair; Warner Nashville
- Songwriters: Ross Copperman; Josh Osborne; Shane McAnally
- Producers: Ross Copperman; Kenny Chesney

Kenny Chesney singles chronology
"Half of My Hometown" (2021)	"Everyone She Knows" (2022)	"Beer with My Friends" (2022)

"Everyone She Knows" is a song written by Ross Copperman, Shane McAnally, and Josh Osborne, and recorded by American country music singer Kenny Chesney. It is the fifth single from his 2020 album Here and Now.

== Content ==
The song is about a woman who judges her own life by comparing herself to her peers before ultimately taking satisfaction in her own life. Chesney described the song as for "women who are their own compass", according to Taste of Country.

== Music video ==
Shaun Silva directed the song's music video, released in March 2022. The music video features actress Aylya Marzolf as the main character exploring the countryside.

== Charts ==
Weekly chart performance for "Everyone She Knows"
Chart (2022)	Peak position
Canada Country (Billboard)	41
US Country Airplay (Billboard)	17
US Hot Country Songs (Billboard)	40
