= What I Need to Do =

Single by Kenny Chesney

from the album Everywhere We Go
- Released: January 31, 2000
- Recorded: 1999
- Genre: Country
- Length: 4:04
- Label: BNA
- Songwriters: Tom Damphier; Bill Luther
- Producers: Buddy Cannon; Norro Wilson

Kenny Chesney singles chronology
"She Thinks My Tractor's Sexy" (1999)	"What I Need to Do" (2000)	"I Lost It" (2000)

"What I Need To Do" is a song written by Tom Damphier and Bill Luther, and recorded by American country music artist Kenny Chesney. It was released in January 2000 as the fourth and final single from Chesney's 1999 album Everywhere We Go. The song peaked at number 8 in the United States and number 13 in Canada in 2000.

== Content ==
The song describes the narrator thinking about "what [he] need[s] to do" as he is driving away from his old hometown away from his former lover. He also thinks that he should "turn [his] car around" and go back to his lover, then hold her, and then tell her how sorry he is for what he did.

== Chart positions ==
Chart (2000)	Peak position
Canada Country (Billboard)	13
US Billboard Hot 100	56
US Hot Country Songs (Billboard)	8

=== Year-end charts ===
Chart (2000)	Position
US Country Songs (Billboard)	36
