= Happy Does =

Single by Kenny Chesney

from the album Here and Now
- Released: July 20, 2020
- Genre: Country
- Length: 2:48
- Label: Blue Chair; Warner Nashville
- Songwriters: Brock Berryhill; Brad Clawson; Greylan James; Jamie Paulin
- Producers: Buddy Cannon; Kenny Chesney

Kenny Chesney singles chronology
"Here and Now" (2020)	"Happy Does" (2020)	"Knowing You" (2021)

"Happy Does" is a song by American country music artist Kenny Chesney. It was released on July 20, 2020, as the third single from his 2020 album Here and Now. The song was written by Brock Berryhill, Brad Clawson, Greylan James, and Jamie Paulin, and produced by Chesney with Buddy Cannon.

The song spent three weeks at number 2 on the country airplay chart, having been blocked by Luke Comb's "Better Together".

== Background ==
Chesney said: “That line about ‘every pickle jar dollar,’” “That was me in college, playing for tips in this little bar in West Virginia. I’d rent a pretty basic sound system, go over the line, set up, play three sets, tear down and drive home, so I could turn the stuff back in at the music store, go through the drive-in, get a breakfast sandwich and get on to class."

“To do what you love, to chase a dream is a really special thing. When you’re doing that, you find a whole lot of happiness with just a little bit of something. The chorus with the rope swing, the palm tree off the rearview mirror, a kiss from someone you love... With all this unknown and all this who knows, it felt like the song people were going to need this summer. Chesney described the melody as feeling good and said the track was intended to be uplifting. So Chesney said he viewed “Happy Does” as an encouraging song for difficult or ordinary days.”

== Charts ==
=== Weekly charts ===
Chart (2020–2021)	Peak position
Canada Country (Billboard)	10
US Billboard Hot 100	47
US Country Airplay (Billboard)	2
US Hot Country Songs (Billboard)	10

=== Year-end charts ===
Chart (2020)	Position
US Country Airplay (Billboard)	60
US Hot Country Songs (Billboard)	80

Chart (2021)	Position
US Country Airplay (Billboard)	42
US Hot Country Songs (Billboard)	68

== Certifications ==
Region	Certification	Certified units/sales
United States (RIAA)	Gold	500,000^{‡}
^{‡} Sales+streaming figures based on certification alone.
