= Don't Happen Twice =

2001 single by Kenny Chesney

Single by Kenny Chesney

from the album Greatest Hits
- B-side: "I Lost It"
- Released: January 19, 2001
- Recorded: 2000
- Genre: Country
- Length: 3:23
- Label: BNA 69035
- Songwriters: Curtis Lance; Thom McHugh
- Producers: Kenny Chesney; Buddy Cannon; Norro Wilson

Kenny Chesney singles chronology
"I Lost It" (2000)	"Don't Happen Twice" (2001)	"The Tin Man" (2001)

"Don't Happen Twice" is a song written by Curtis Lance and Thom McHugh and recorded by American country music artist Kenny Chesney. It was released in January 2001 as the second single from Chesney's Greatest Hits compilation album . The song reached number one on the US Billboard Hot Country Singles & Tracks (now Hot Country Songs) charts in June 2001.

== Content ==
"Don't Happen Twice" is a song about a man meeting his first love again. She asks him if he remembers her, and he replies by telling her about all the times they spent together. He says he could never forget her.

== Music video ==
The music video for "Don't Happen Twice" was co-directed by Glen Rose and Kenny Chesney. It premiered on CMT on January 30, 2001, and was named a "Hot Shot" by CMT. The video "Don't Happen Twice" shows Kenny Chesney on tour. It also includes a cameo appearance by Tim McGraw.

== Chart performance ==
"Don't Happen Twice" debuted at number 60 on the U.S. Billboard Hot Country Singles & Tracks for the chart week of January 20, 2001.

Chart (2001)	Peak position
US Hot Country Songs (Billboard)	1
US Billboard Hot 100	26

=== Year-end charts ===
Year-end chart performance for "Don't Happen Twice"
Chart (2001)	Position
Canada Radio (Nielsen BDS)	94
US Country Songs (Billboard)	3
US Billboard Hot 100	85

== Certifications ==
Region	Certification	Certified units/sales
United States (RIAA)	Gold	500,000^{‡}
^{‡} Sales+streaming figures based on certification alone.
