= Knowing You (song) =

Single by Kenny Chesney

Single by Kenny Chesney

from the album Here and Now
- Released: March 15, 2021
- Genre: Country
- Length: 3:46
- Label: Blue Chair; Warner Nashville
- Songwriters: Adam James; Brett James; Kat Higgins
- Producers: Buddy Cannon; Kenny Chesney

Kenny Chesney singles chronology
| "Happy Does" (2020) | "Knowing You" (2021) | "Half of My Hometown" (2021) |

Music video
- "Knowing You" on YouTube

"Knowing You" is a song by American country music artist Kenny Chesney. It was released on March 15, 2021 as the fourth single from his 2020 album Here and Now. The song was co-written by Adam James, Brett James and Kat Higgins, and produced by Chesney with Buddy Cannon.

== Background ==
Chesney explained the song is about losing a person who was close to you and choosing to look back at the relationship with gratitude rather than sadness, gratitude and being happy that someone was in your life in the first place.

At CMT's interview, he mentioned: “This song is really special to me. It holds everything that drew me to country music at a time when nothing really sounds like what this is.”

== Music video ==
The music video was released on March 12, 2021, and directed by Shaun Silva. It was filmed in Gloucester, Massachusetts. Juxtaposed sunny days and the beaches of the Virgin Islands with fog, mist, and hard work of life, Chesney took to the open sea on the local fishing boat Orion.

== Live performance ==
On April 18, 2021, Chesney performed the song at the 56th Academy of Country Music Awards.

== Charts ==
=== Weekly charts ===
Weekly chart performance for "Knowing You"
| Chart (2021) | Peak position |
|---|---|
| Australia Country Hot 50 (TMN) | 42 |
| Canada Hot 100 (Billboard) | 92 |
| Canada Country (Billboard) | 7 |
| US Billboard Hot 100 | 57 |
| US Country Airplay (Billboard) | 2 |
| US Hot Country Songs (Billboard) | 10 |

=== Year-end charts ===
Year-end chart performance for "Knowing You"
| Chart (2021) | Position |
|---|---|
| US Country Airplay (Billboard) | 41 |
| US Hot Country Songs (Billboard) | 44 |

== Certifications ==
| Region | Certification | Certified units/sales |
|---|---|---|
| United States (RIAA) | Platinum | 1,000,000^{‡} |
^{‡} Sales+streaming figures based on certification alone.
