= Here and Now (Kenny Chesney song) =

Single by Kenny Chesney

from the album Here and Now
- Released: February 21, 2020
- Genre: Country
- Length: 2:52
- Label: Blue Chair/Warner Nashville
- Songwriter(s): Craig Wiseman; David Garcia; David Lee Murphy
- Producer(s): Kenny Chesney; Buddy Cannon

Kenny Chesney singles chronology
"Tip of My Tongue" (2019)	"Here and Now" (2020)	"Happy Does" (2020)

"Here and Now" is a song recorded by American country music singer Kenny Chesney. It is the second single and title track from his nineteenth studio album Here and Now. The song was written by Craig Wiseman, David Lee Murphy and David Garcia.

== Content ==
Chesney told The Boot that “The chorus is everything I feel about my time on stage... the rush of it absolutely being the best place, best moment in the entire world. There’s no rush like it...It says everything about how we all put off living our lives because there’s so much other stuff to do." It has a central theme about "living in the moment".

Brian Mansfield, writing for Variety, said that "With a guitar intro that recalls the Doobie Brothers' 'China Grove', the bracing title track marries Chesney’s classic-rock-infused country with his in-the-moment philosophy..Instead of ringing hollow, it might be the perfect motivational song for quarantine days — a high-energy number that doesn’t necessarily try to get you to do anything, except maybe to make the most of doing nothing."

== Chart performance ==
"Here and Now" reached a peak of Number One on the Billboard Country Airplay chart for the week dated July 4, 2020, making it his 31st Number One hit.

== Charts ==
=== Weekly charts ===
Chart (2020)	Peak position
Canada (Canadian Hot 100)	73
Canada Country (Billboard)	1
US Billboard Hot 100	38
US Country Airplay (Billboard)	1
US Hot Country Songs (Billboard)	7
US Rolling Stone Top 100	84

=== Year-end charts ===
Chart (2020)	Position
US Country Airplay (Billboard)	39
US Hot Country Songs (Billboard)	33

== Certifications ==
Region	Certification	Certified units/sales
United States (RIAA)	Gold	500,000^{‡}
^{‡} Sales+streaming figures based on certification alone.
