= She Thinks My Tractor's Sexy =

1999 single by Kenny Chesney

Single by Kenny Chesney

from the album Everywhere We Go
- B-side: "What I Need to Do"
- Released: October 4, 1999
- Recorded: 1999
- Genre: Country
- Length: 4:08
- Label: BNA 65964
- Songwriters: Jim Collins; Paul Overstreet
- Producers: Buddy Cannon; Norro Wilson

Kenny Chesney singles chronology
"You Had Me from Hello" (1999)	"She Thinks My Tractor's Sexy" (1999)	"What I Need to Do" (2000)

"She Thinks My Tractor's Sexy" is a song written by Jim Collins and Paul Overstreet and recorded by American country music artist Kenny Chesney. It was released on October 4, 1999, as the third single from Chesney's 1999 album Everywhere We Go. The song peaked at number 11 on the US Billboard Hot Country Songs chart in early 2000, and was certified Gold by the RIAA. The song remains one of Chesney's most popular.

== Content ==
"She Thinks My Tractor's Sexy" is an uptempo tune set in the key of B♭ major with a vocal range from B♭_{3} to F_{5}. The song describes a man who is working on a farm and driving a tractor "in the hot summer sun". He describes himself as being attractive to a woman who "thinks [his] tractor's sexy".

== Music video ==
The music video was directed by Martin Kahan, and premiered on CMT on October 14, 1999, during "The CMT Delivery Room". The video shows Chesney as a farmer riding on a John Deere tractor. A woman walks in the field wearing sunglasses and a black dress, as well as a cowboy hat and jeans dancing in the barn. Throughout the video, Chesney was singing with an old fashioned microphone in a barn, with a John Deere tractor behind him, as well as a woman dancing with Chesney in the barn. At the end of the video, Chesney and a woman are sitting on a water trough, splashing water with a cowboy hat.

== Chart performance ==
"She Thinks My Tractor's Sexy" first charted on the Billboard Hot Country Singles & Tracks chart as an album cut, reaching number 72 on the week of June 26, 1999. It re-entered the charts at number 75 on the week of August 14, 1999, then fell out and re-entered again at number 74 on September 4. Its last re-entry was at number 67 on September 25, 1999, spending a total of 21 weeks on the US country chart and peaking at number 11.

Chart (1999–2000)	Peak position
Canada Country Singles (RPM)	20
US Billboard Hot 100	74
US Hot Country Songs (Billboard)	11

== Certifications ==
Certifications for She Thinks My Tractor's Sexy
Region	Certification	Certified units/sales
United States (RIAA)	2× Platinum	2,000,000^{‡}
United States (RIAA) Mastertone	Gold	500,000^{*}
^{*} Sales figures based on certification alone.^{‡} Sales+streaming figures based on certification alone.

== Parodies ==
Cledus T. Judd parodied the song as "My Cellmate Thinks I'm Sexy" on his 2000 album Just Another Day in Parodies. This parody referenced Chesney's and Tim McGraw's June 2000 arrests after stealing a Mounted Reserve deputy's horse. Released as a single late that year, Judd's parody reached number 61 on the country charts.

On Chesney's 2004 song "When the Sun Goes Down", guest vocalist Uncle Kracker sings the line "She thinks Kracker's sexy".
