= You Had Me from Hello =

Single by Kenny Chesney

from the album Everywhere We Go
- B-side: "Everywhere We Go"
- Released: April 19, 1999
- Recorded: 1999
- Genre: Country
- Length: 3:51
- Label: BNA 65745
- Songwriters: Kenny Chesney; Skip Ewing
- Producers: Buddy Cannon; Norro Wilson

Kenny Chesney singles chronology
"How Forever Feels" (1998)	"You Had Me from Hello" (1999)	"She Thinks My Tractor's Sexy" (1999)

"You Had Me from Hello" is a song co-written and recorded by American country music artist Kenny Chesney. It was released in April 1999 as the second single from his 1999 album Everywhere We Go. The song reached number one on the U.S. Billboard Hot Country Singles & Tracks (now Hot Country Songs) chart in September 1999. It was also certified gold by the RIAA. Chesney wrote this song with Skip Ewing.

== Background and writing ==
In 1996, Chesney and Skip Ewing saw the movie Jerry Maguire. In one of the film's most memorable scenes at the end of the movie, Tom Cruise's title character gives out a heartfelt speech to Renée Zellweger's character, Dorothy Boyd; Zellweger stops Cruise and tearfully says "You had me at 'hello'." Chesney liked that line and decided to write a song based on it, mistranslating "at" to "from". Chesney and Zellweger were later married for four months in 2005.

== Chart performance ==
"You Had Me from Hello" debuted at number 71 on the U.S. Billboard Hot Country Singles & Tracks for the week of April 17, 1999, while Chesney's previous single "How Forever Feels" was still at number one.

Chart (1999)	Peak position
Canada Country Singles (RPM)	1
US Billboard Hot 100	34
US Hot Country Songs (Billboard)	1

=== Year-end charts ===
Chart (1999)	Position
Canada Country Tracks (RPM)	19
US Country Songs (Billboard)	6

== Certifications ==
Region	Certification	Certified units/sales
United States (RIAA)	Platinum	1,000,000^{‡}
United States (RIAA) Mastertone	Gold	500,000^{*}
^{*} Sales figures based on certification alone.^{‡} Sales+streaming figures based on certification alone.
