= How Forever Feels =

- Artwork for US single

Single by Kenny Chesney

from the album Everywhere We Go
- B-side: "You Win, I Win, We Lose"
- Released: December 7, 1998
- Recorded: 1998
- Genre: Country
- Length: 3:08
- Label: BNA 65666
- Songwriters: Wendell Mobley; Tony Mullins
- Producers: Buddy Cannon; Norro Wilson

Kenny Chesney singles chronology
"I Will Stand" (1998)	"How Forever Feels" (1998)	"You Had Me from Hello" (1999)

"How Forever Feels" is a song written by Wendell Mobley and Tony Mullins and recorded by American country music artist Kenny Chesney. It was released in December 1998 as the first single from Chesney's 1999 album Everywhere We Go. The song reached number one on the U.S. Billboard Hot Country Singles & Tracks chart and the RPM Country Tracks chart in Canada. It also peaked at number 27 on the U.S. Billboard Hot 100, making it Chesney's first Top 40 hit on the pop chart.

== Background ==
Chesney told Billboard magazine that he almost didn't get to release the song because Tim McGraw had recorded a version. McGraw decided not to release it, and after Chesney's version hit number-one, McGraw told him "I'm glad you cut it. It just didn't work for me." Chesney went on to say that the song originally appealed to him because "it's the only love song I know of that has both Jimmy Buffett and Richard Petty in it."

McGraw's version of the song remained unreleased until appearing on his 2016 compilation album McGraw: The Ultimate Collection.

== Content ==
The song's narrator is a young man who talks about how fun his life has been, and there is something missing: a love with his partner he had for a long time.

== Music video ==
The music video was directed by Martin Kahan, and produced by Big Light Pictures. It premiered on CMT on December 11, 1998, during "The CMT Delivery Room". Chesney traveled to St. Thomas VI to film the song's music video, which became Chesney's first Caribbean beach-inspired video, that became a trademark of him in his future videos.

== Chart performance ==
"How Forever Feels" debuted at number 65 on the U.S. Billboard Hot Country Singles & Tracks for the week of December 12, 1998. It spent 6 weeks at #1 in the US.

Chart (1998–1999)	Peak position
Canada Country Singles (RPM)	1
US Billboard Hot 100	27
US Hot Country Songs (Billboard)	1

=== Year-end charts ===
Chart (1999)	Position
Canada Country Tracks (RPM)	10
US Billboard Hot 100	84
US Country Songs (Billboard)	4

== Certifications ==
Certifications for How Forever Feels
Region	Certification	Certified units/sales
United States (RIAA)	Platinum	1,000,000^{‡}
^{‡} Sales+streaming figures based on certification alone.
