= Kenny Chesney singles discography =

Kenny Chesney discography
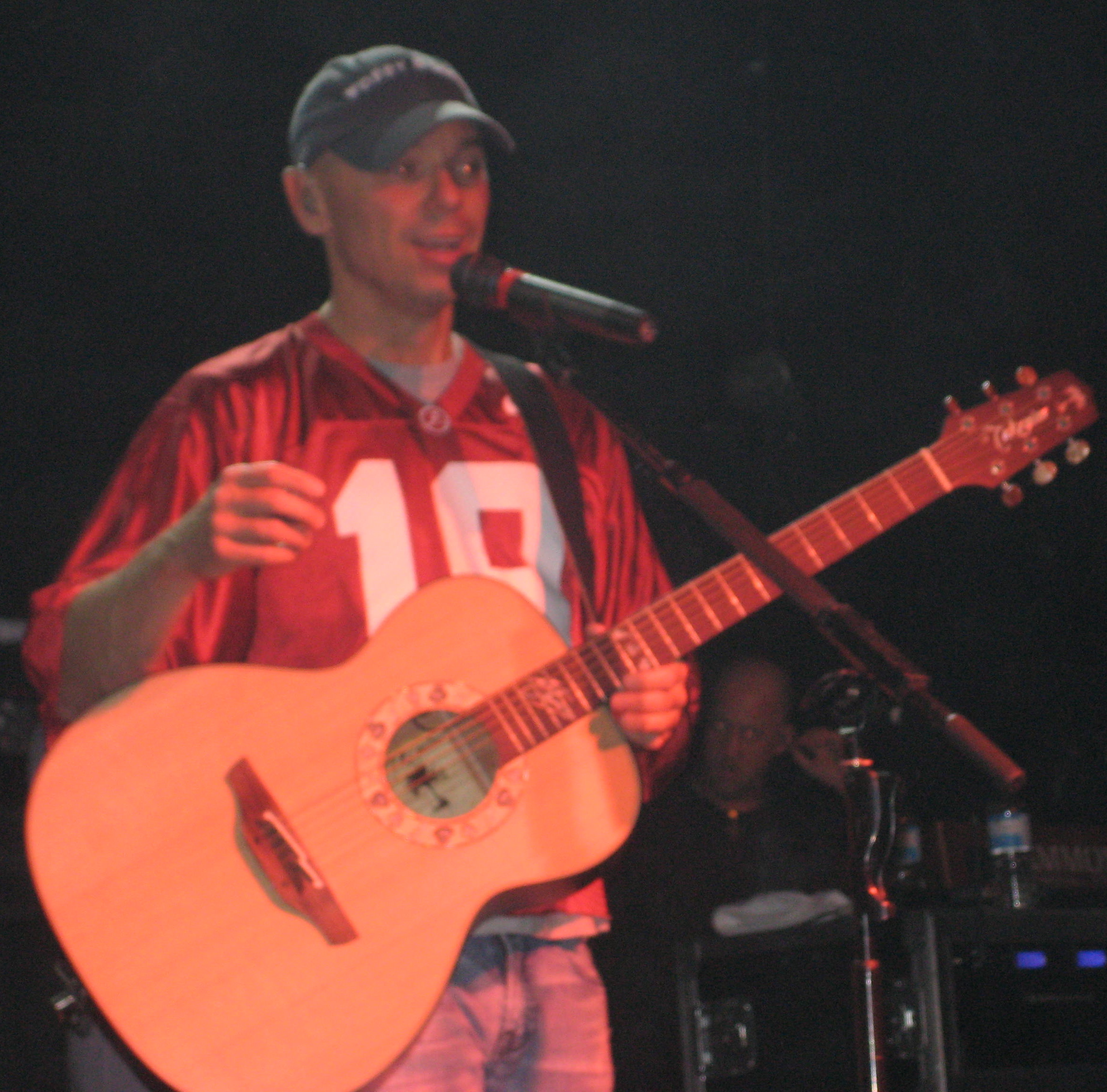
- Chesney performing in 2008
- Singles: 75
- Music videos: 56
- Other charted songs: 24

American country music singer Kenny Chesney has released 75 singles (including "The Tin Man", of which two versions were released). Of Chesney's singles, all but four have charted in the Top 40 on the US Billboard Hot Country Songs and/or Country Airplay chart. Thirty-two of his singles have reached number one, beginning with "She's Got It All" in 1997. "The Good Stuff" (2002) and "There Goes My Life" (2003–2004) are his longest-lasting number ones on the charts at seven weeks each. The former was also the number one country music song of 2002 according to the Billboard Year-End charts. Most of his singles from the mid-1998 "That's Why I'm Here" onwards have charted on the Billboard Hot 100 as well, with twenty-six of his singles peaking inside the Top 40. "Out Last Night" (2009) is his highest peak on that chart at number 16.

Chesney also charted in the Top 10 in mid-2004 as a guest artist on the collaboration "Hey, Good Lookin'". He has also reached the lower regions of the Hot Country Songs with multiple album cuts, including two charity singles in 1998 and seven cuts from his Christmas album All I Want for Christmas Is a Real Good Tan (including the number 30 title track).

== As lead artist ==
=== 1990s ===
Year	Title	Peak chart positions			Certifications (sales threshold)	Album
Year	Title	US	US Country	CAN Country	Certifications (sales threshold)	Album
1993	"Whatever It Takes"	—	59	24		In My Wildest Dreams
1994	"The Tin Man"	—	70	—		In My Wildest Dreams
1994	"Somebody's Callin'"	—	—	—		In My Wildest Dreams
1995	"Fall in Love"	—	6	6		All I Need to Know
1995	"All I Need to Know"	—	8	8		All I Need to Know
1995	"Grandpa Told Me So"	—	23	17		All I Need to Know
1996	"Back in My Arms Again"	—	41	30		Me and You
1996	"Me and You"	— (Note: "Me and You" did not enter the Hot 100, but peaked at number 12 on Bubbling Under Hot 100 Singles, which acts as a 25-song extension of the Hot 100.)	2	8	RIAA: Platinum	Me and You
1996	"When I Close My Eyes"	—	2	4		Me and You
1997	"She's Got It All"	— (Note: "She's Got It All" did not enter the Hot 100, but peaked at number 10 on Bubbling Under Hot 100 Singles, which acts as a 25-song extension of the Hot 100.)	1	1	RIAA: Platinum	I Will Stand
1997	"A Chance"	—	11	17		I Will Stand
1998	"That's Why I'm Here"	79	2	9		I Will Stand
1998	"I Will Stand"	— (Note: "I Will Stand" did not enter the Hot 100, but peaked at number 1 on Bubbling Under Hot 100 Singles, which acts as a 25-song extension of the Hot 100.)	27	33		I Will Stand
1998	"How Forever Feels"	27	1	1	RIAA: Platinum	Everywhere We Go
1999	"You Had Me from Hello"	34	1	1	RIAA: Platinum	Everywhere We Go
1999	"She Thinks My Tractor's Sexy"	74	11	20	RIAA: 2× Platinum	Everywhere We Go
"—" denotes releases that did not chart.

=== 2000s ===
Year	Title	Peak chart positions				Certifications (sales threshold)	Album
Year	Title	US	US Country	CAN	CAN Country	Certifications (sales threshold)	Album
2000	"What I Need to Do"	56	8	—	13		Everywhere We Go
2000	"I Lost It"	34	3	—	21	RIAA: Gold	Greatest Hits
2001	"Don't Happen Twice"	26	1	—	—	RIAA: Gold	Greatest Hits
2001	"The Tin Man" (re-recording)	— (Note: The 2001 re-recording of "The Tin Man" did not enter the Hot 100, but peaked at number 7 on Bubbling Under Hot 100 Singles, which acts as a 25-song extension of the Hot 100.)	19	—	—		Greatest Hits
2001	"Young"	35	2	—	—	RIAA: Platinum	No Shoes, No Shirt, No Problems
2002	"The Good Stuff"	22	1	—	—	RIAA: 2× Platinum	No Shoes, No Shirt, No Problems
2002	"A Lot of Things Different"	55	6	—	—		No Shoes, No Shirt, No Problems
2003	"Big Star"	28	2	—	—		No Shoes, No Shirt, No Problems
2003	"No Shoes, No Shirt, No Problems"	28	2	—	—	RIAA: 2× Platinum	No Shoes, No Shirt, No Problems
2003	"There Goes My Life"	29	1	—	—	RIAA: 2× Platinum	When the Sun Goes Down
2004	"When the Sun Goes Down" (with Uncle Kracker)	26	1	—	1	RIAA: 3× Platinum	When the Sun Goes Down
2004	"I Go Back"	32	2	—	1	RIAA: 2× Platinum	When the Sun Goes Down
2004	"The Woman with You"	33	2	—	2		When the Sun Goes Down
2005	"Anything but Mine"	48	1	—	2	RIAA: Platinum	When the Sun Goes Down
2005	"Keg in the Closet"	64	6	—	5		When the Sun Goes Down
2005	"Who You'd Be Today"	37	2	—	1	RIAA: Gold	The Road and the Radio
2006	"Living in Fast Forward"	48	1	—	1	RIAA: Gold	The Road and the Radio
2006	"Summertime"	34	1	—	1	RIAA: 3× Platinum	The Road and the Radio
2006	"You Save Me"	41	3	—	4	RIAA: Platinum	The Road and the Radio
2007	"Beer in Mexico"	61	1	—	1	RIAA: Platinum	The Road and the Radio
2007	"Never Wanted Nothing More"	22	1	49	1	RIAA: Platinum	Just Who I Am: Poets & Pirates
2007	"Don't Blink"	29	1	45	1	RIAA: 3× Platinum	Just Who I Am: Poets & Pirates
2007	"Shiftwork" (featuring George Strait) (Note: "Shiftwork" was credited solely to Chesney until partway through its chart run.)	47	2	61	2	RIAA: Gold	Just Who I Am: Poets & Pirates
2008	"Better as a Memory"	46	1	61	2	RIAA: Gold	Just Who I Am: Poets & Pirates
2008	"Everybody Wants to Go to Heaven" (featuring The Wailers) (Note: The Wailers were not credited on "Everybody Wants to Go to Heaven" until the song's second week at the No. 1 position on Hot Country Songs. Prior to this, the song was credited to Chesney alone.)	41	1	49	1	RIAA: Gold	Lucky Old Sun
2008	"Down the Road" (featuring Mac McAnally)	47	1	57	1	RIAA: Gold	Lucky Old Sun
2009	"Out Last Night"	16	1	41	1	RIAA: Platimum	Greatest Hits II
2009	"I'm Alive" (featuring Dave Matthews) (Note: "I'm Alive" charted as an album cut from Lucky Old Sun. It was later added to the track listing of Greatest Hits II, from which it was officially released as a single.)	32	6	73	6	RIAA: Gold	Greatest Hits II
"—" denotes releases that did not chart.

=== 2010s ===
Year	Title	Peak chart positions								Certifications (sales threshold)	Album
Year	Title	US	US Country Songs	US Country Airplay	US AC	AUS	CAN	CAN Country	CAN AC	Certifications (sales threshold)	Album
2010	"Ain't Back Yet" (Note: "Ain't Back Yet" is available only on the March 2010 release of Greatest Hits II.)	50	3		—	—	72	2	–		Greatest Hits II (reissue)
2010	"The Boys of Fall"	18	1		—	—	77	1	—	RIAA: 2× Platinum	Hemingway's Whiskey
2010	"Somewhere with You"	31	1		15	—	52	1	—	RIAA: 3× Platinum	Hemingway's Whiskey
2011	"Live a Little"	61	1		—	—	78	1	—	RIAA: Gold	Hemingway's Whiskey
2011	"You and Tequila" (featuring Grace Potter)	33	3		—	—	62	5	—	RIAA: 4× Platinum	Hemingway's Whiskey
2011	"Reality"	62	1		—	—	77	2	—		Hemingway's Whiskey
2012	"Feel Like a Rock Star" (featuring Tim McGraw)	40	11		—	—	33	9	—	RIAA: Gold	Welcome to the Fishbowl
2012	"Come Over"	23	1		—	—	48	1	—	RIAA: 3× Platinum	Welcome to the Fishbowl
2012	"El Cerrito Place"	72	17	10	—	—	—	31	—	RIAA: Gold	Welcome to the Fishbowl
2013	"Pirate Flag"	46	7	3	—	—	53	6	—	RIAA: Platinum	Life on a Rock
2013	"When I See This Bar"	84	25	14	—	—	—	14	—		Life on a Rock
2014	"American Kids"	23	2	1	—	—	27	1	—	RIAA: 5× Platinum; RMNZ: Gold	The Big Revival
2014	"Til It's Gone"	60	8	1	—	—	75	1	—	RIAA: Gold	The Big Revival
2015	"Wild Child" (featuring Grace Potter)	56	9	1	—	—	69	3	—	RIAA: Gold	The Big Revival
2015	"Save It for a Rainy Day"	54	4	1	—	—	61	1	—	RIAA: Platinum	The Big Revival
2016	"Noise"	72	14	6	—	—	98	5	—	RIAA: Gold; MC: Gold	Cosmic Hallelujah
2016	"Setting the World on Fire" (with Pink)	29	1	1	—	26	48	1	31	RIAA: 2× Platinum; ARIA: Gold; MC: Platinum; RMNZ: Gold	Cosmic Hallelujah
2017	"Bar at the End of the World"	92	17	10	—	—	—	2	—	RIAA: Gold	Cosmic Hallelujah
2017	"All the Pretty Girls"	63	7	1	—	—	—	2	—	RIAA: 2× Platinum	Cosmic Hallelujah
2018	"Get Along"	22	2	1	—	—	47	1	—	RIAA: 3× Platinum; MC: Platinum; RMNZ: Gold	Songs for the Saints
2018	"Better Boat" (featuring Mindy Smith)	—	34	25	—	—	—	49	—		Songs for the Saints
2019	"Tip of My Tongue"	73	13	8	—	—	98	3	—	RIAA: Platinum; MC: Gold	Here and Now
"—" denotes releases that did not chart

=== 2020s ===
Year	Title	Peak chart positions					Certifications (sales threshold)	Album
Year	Title	US	US Country Songs	US Country Airplay	CAN	CAN Country	Certifications (sales threshold)	Album
2020	"Here and Now"	38	7	1	73	1	RIAA: Gold	Here and Now
2020	"Happy Does"	47	10	2	—	10	RIAA: Gold	Here and Now
2021	"Knowing You"	57	10	2	92	7	RIAA: Platinum	Here and Now
2022	"Everyone She Knows"	—	40	17	—	41		Here and Now
2022	"Beer with My Friends" (with Old Dominion)	— (Note: "Beer with My Friends" did not enter the Hot 100, but peaked at number 25 on the Bubbling Under Hot 100 Singles, which acts as a 25-song extension of the Hot 100.)	35	28	—	42		Non-album single
2023	"Take Her Home"	71	19	1	—	4		Born
2024	"Just to Say We Did"	—	—	16	—	28		Born
2026	"Carry On"	44	14	1	85	2		Silver Sands Marina
2026	"Remember Me That Way"	—	—	20	—	36		Silver Sands Marina
"—" denotes releases that did not chart

== As featured artist ==
Year	Single	Peak chart positions				Certifications (sales threshold)	Album
Year	Single	US	US Country Songs	US Country Airplay	CAN Country	Certifications (sales threshold)	Album
2002	"Words Are Your Wheels" (amongst Phil Vassar and Friends)	—	—	—	—		Non-album single
2008	"Every Other Weekend" (Reba McEntire with Kenny Chesney)	— (Note: "Every Other Weekend" did not enter the Hot 100, but peaked at number 4 on Bubbling Under Hot 100 Singles, which acts as a 25-song extension of the Hot 100.)	15		—		Reba: Duets
2017	"Everything's Gonna Be Alright" (with David Lee Murphy)	66	9	1	16	RIAA: Platinum	No Zip Code
2021	"Half of My Hometown" (Kelsea Ballerini featuring Kenny Chesney)	53	11	1	13	RIAA: Platinum; ARIA: Gold	Kelsea
2025	"You Had to Be There" (with Megan Moroney)	86	25	23	27	RIAA: Gold	Non-album single
"—" denotes releases that did not chart

== Promotional singles ==
Year	Single	Peak chart positions	Album
Year	Single	US Country Songs	Album
1998	"Touchdown Tennessee" (Note: "Touchdown Tennessee" is a tribute song to radio broadcaster John Ward.)	64	—N/a
1999	"Team of Destiny" (Note: "Team of Destiny" was a tribute song to Tennessee Volunteers football; it was withdrawn from rotation at the request of the National Collegiate Athletic Association (NCAA).)	72	—N/a

== Other charted and certified songs ==
These songs were charted from unsolicited airplay or download sales. "Beer in Mexico", "Shiftwork" and "I'm Alive" were later released as official singles.

Year	Single	Peak chart positions			Certifications (sales threshold)	Album
Year	Single	US Bubbling	US Country Songs	US Country Airplay	Certifications (sales threshold)	Album
1996	"Back Where I Come From"	—	—		RIAA: Gold	Me and You
2002	"Live Those Songs"	—	60			No Shoes, No Shirt, No Problems
2003	"Luckenbach, Texas (Back to the Basics of Love)" (featuring Kid Rock)	—	— (Note: "Luckenbach, Texas" did not chart on Billboard Hot Country Songs, but reached number 49 on Radio & Records Country Top 50.)			I've Always Been Crazy: A Tribute to Waylon Jennings
2005	"Guitars and Tiki Bars"	—	53			Be as You Are: Songs from an Old Blue Chair
2005	"The Road and the Radio"	—	59			The Road and the Radio
2005	"Beer in Mexico" (Note: "Beer in Mexico" and "Shiftwork" charted as album cuts prior to their official releases.)	—	60			The Road and the Radio
2007	"Flip Flop Summer"	—	49			The Road and the Radio
2007	"Shiftwork" (featuring George Strait)	—	42			Just Who I Am: Poets & Pirates
2007	"Wild Ride" (featuring Joe Walsh)	—	56			Just Who I Am: Poets & Pirates
2008	"Got a Little Crazy"	—	57			Just Who I Am: Poets & Pirates
2008	"Nowhere to Go, Nowhere to Be"	5	—			Lucky Old Sun
2008	"Spirit of a Storm"	25	—			Lucky Old Sun
2008	"Ten with a Two"	—	54			Lucky Old Sun
2008	"Got a Little Crazy" (re-entry)	—	52			Just Who I Am: Poets & Pirates
2008	"I'm Alive" (featuring Dave Matthews)	18	55			Lucky Old Sun
2008	"That Lucky Old Sun" (featuring Willie Nelson)	—	56			Lucky Old Sun
2010	"This Is Our Moment"	22	46			Greatest Hits II (reissue)
2013	"Lindy"	—	44	—		Life on a Rock
2013	"Coconut Tree" (featuring Willie Nelson)	—	—	56		Life on a Rock
2013	"Must Be Something I Missed"	—	—	59		Life on a Rock
2013	"Life on a Rock"	—	49	60		Life on a Rock
2014	"Flora-Bama"	11	26	—		The Big Revival
2014	"The Big Revival"	—	27	—		The Big Revival
"—" denotes releases that did not chart

=== Christmas songs ===
Year	Single	Peak chart positions		Album
Year	Single	US Country Songs	US Country Airplay	Album
1998	"Away in a Manger"	67		Country Christmas Classics
2003	"All I Want for Christmas Is a Real Good Tan"	30		All I Want for Christmas Is a Real Good Tan
2003	"Pretty Paper" (featuring Willie Nelson)	45		All I Want for Christmas Is a Real Good Tan
2003	"Jingle Bells"	49		All I Want for Christmas Is a Real Good Tan
2003	"Silver Bells"	54		All I Want for Christmas Is a Real Good Tan
2003	"Silent Night" (featuring The Grigsby Twins) (Note: The Grigsby Twins are Chesney's mother Karen and aunt Sharon.)	57		All I Want for Christmas Is a Real Good Tan
2003	"I'll Be Home for Christmas"	60		All I Want for Christmas Is a Real Good Tan
2003	"Thank God for Kids"	60		All I Want for Christmas Is a Real Good Tan
2014	"Christmas in Blue Chair Bay"	—	48	Non-album single
"—" denotes releases that did not chart

== Videography ==
=== Music videos ===
Year	Video	Director
1993	"Whatever It Takes"	Tom Bevins
1994	"The Tin Man"	Tom Bevins
1994	"Somebody's Callin'"	Jeffrey C. Phillips
1995	"Fall in Love"	Steven T. Miller/R. Brad Murano
1995	"All I Need to Know"	Chuck Kuhn
1996	"Me and You"	Chuck Kuhn
1997	"She's Got It All"	Martin Kahan
1997	"That's Why I'm Here"	Martin Kahan
1999	"How Forever Feels"	Martin Kahan
1999	"She Thinks My Tractor's Sexy"	Martin Kahan
2000	"I Lost It"	Martin Kahan
2001	"Don't Happen Twice"	Kenny Chesney/Glen Rose
2002	"Young"	Shaun Silva
2002	"The Good Stuff"	Shaun Silva
2003	"Big Star"	Shaun Silva
2003	"No Shoes, No Shirt, No Problems"	Shaun Silva
2003	"There Goes My Life"	Shaun Silva
2004	"When the Sun Goes Down" (featuring Uncle Kracker)	Shaun Silva
2004	"Live Those Songs"	Shaun Silva
2004	"I Go Back"	Shaun Silva
2004	"Anything But Mine"	Shaun Silva
2005	"Old Blue Chair"	Shaun Silva
2005	"Who You'd Be Today"	Shaun Silva
2005	"Living in Fast Forward"	Shaun Silva
2006	"You Save Me"	Shaun Silva
2007	"Summertime"	Shaun Silva/Kenny Chesney
2007	"Don't Blink"	Shaun Silva
2007	"Shiftwork"	Shaun Silva
2008	"Everybody Wants to Go to Heaven" (featuring The Wailers)	Shaun Silva
2008	"Got a Little Crazy"	Shaun Silva/Kenny Chesney
2009	"Out Last Night"	Shaun Silva
2009	"I'm Alive" (featuring Dave Matthews)	Shaun Silva/Potsy Ponciroli
2010	"Ain't Back Yet"	Shaun Silva
2010	"The Boys of Fall"	Shaun Silva
2011	"You and Tequila" (featuring Grace Potter)	Shaun Silva
2011	"Reality"	Shaun Silva
2012	"Feel Like a Rock Star" (featuring Tim McGraw)	Shaun Silva
2012	"Come Over"	Shaun Silva
2013	"Pirate Flag"	Shaun Silva
2013	"When I See This Bar"	Shaun Silva
2013	"Spread the Love" (featuring The Wailers)	Shaun Silva
2014	"American Kids"	Shaun Silva
2014	"Til It's Gone"	Don Carr
2014	"Flora Bama"	Shaun Silva
2014	"Christmas in Blue Chair Bay"	Kenny Chesney
2015	"Wild Child" (featuring Grace Potter)	Shaun Silva
2015	"Save It for a Rainy Day"	Shaun Silva
2016	"Noise"	Shaun Silva
2016	"Setting the World on Fire" (featuring P!nk)	P. R. Brown
2017	"All the Pretty Girls"	Jessica Martinez/William Renner
2017	"Rich and Miserable"	Danny Foxx
2018	"Get Along"	Michael Monaco
2021	"Knowing You"	Shaun Silva
2022	"Everyone She Knows"	Shaun Silva
2024	"Take Her Home"	Shaun Silva
2024	"Just To Say We Did"	Shaun Silva

=== Guest appearances ===
Year	Video	Director
2004	"Hey, Good Lookin'" (Jimmy Buffett featuring Clint Black, Alan Jackson, Toby Keith and George Strait)	Trey Fanjoy/Stan Kellam
2017	"Dust on the Bottle" (live version) (with David Lee Murphy)	Shaun Silva
