= Kenny Chesney albums discography =

Kenny Chesney discography
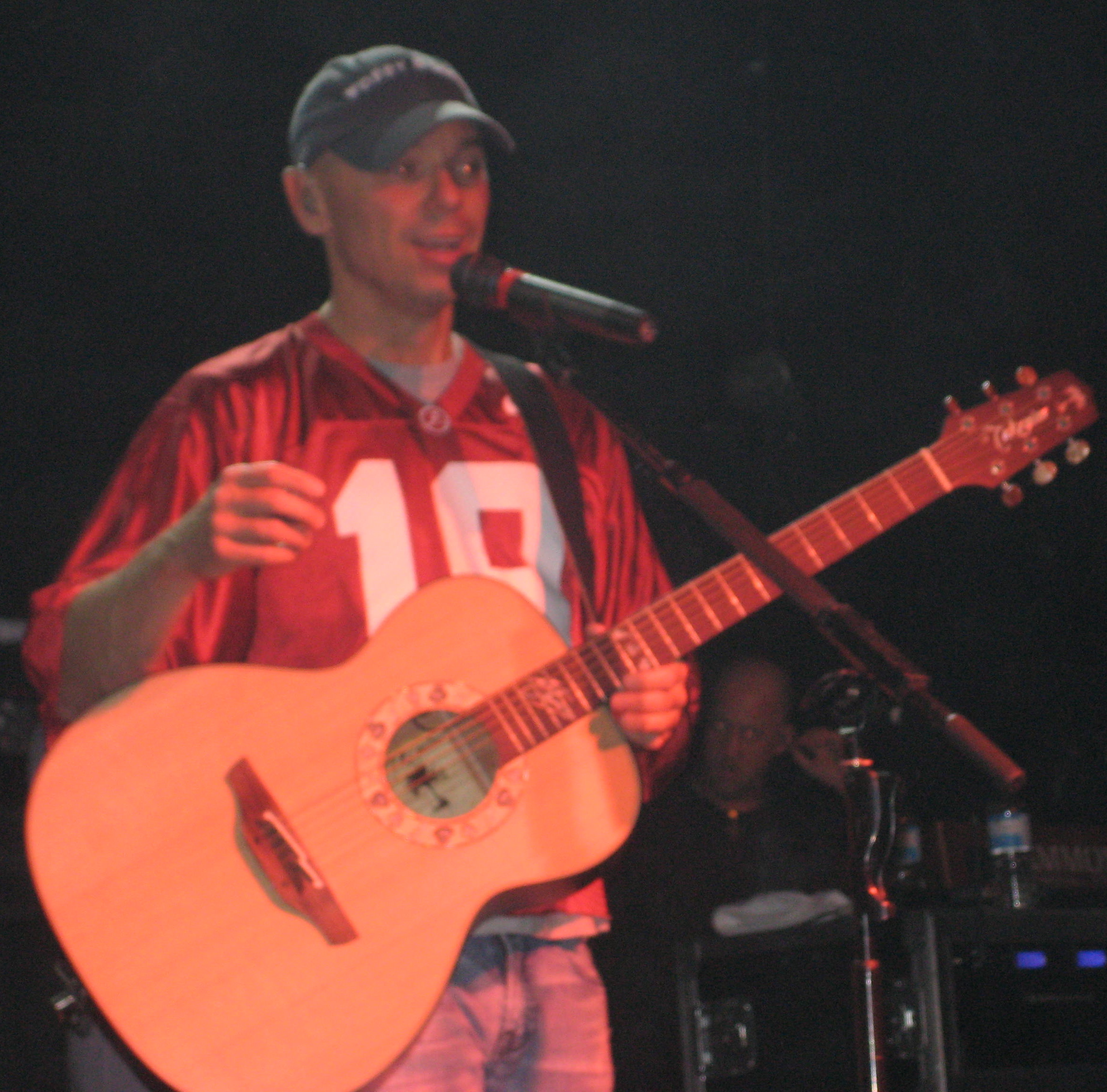
- Chesney performing in 2008
- Studio albums: 21
- Live albums: 2
- Compilation albums: 3

American country music singer Kenny Chesney has released 21 studio albums (including a Christmas album), two live albums and two greatest hits albums. Ten of his albums consecutively reached number one on the US Billboard Top Country Albums chart. Fourteen of them have been certified gold or higher by the Recording Industry Association of America (RIAA). His highest-certified albums are No Shoes, No Shirt, No Problems (2002), When the Sun Goes Down (2004), and his first Greatest Hits compilation, each certified 4× Platinum for shipping four million copies in the US. Chesney has recorded for four labels: Capricorn Records, BNA Records, Columbia Records Nashville, and Warner Records Nashville. Since 2008's Lucky Old Sun, his albums have been released in association with his own label, Blue Chair Records.

== Studio albums ==
=== 1990s albums ===
Title	Album details	Peak chart positions				Certifications (sales thresholds)
Title	Album details	US	US Country	US Heat.	CAN Country	Certifications (sales thresholds)
In My Wildest Dreams	Release date: April 19, 1994; Label: Capricorn; Format: CD, cassette	—	—	37	—	
All I Need to Know	Release date: June 13, 1995; Label: BNA; Format: CD, cassette	—	39	9	—	RIAA: Gold
Me and You	Release date: June 4, 1996; Label: BNA; Format: CD, cassette	78	9	1	—	RIAA: Platinum
I Will Stand	Release date: July 15, 1997; Label: BNA; Format: CD, cassette	95	10	—	—	RIAA: Platinum
Everywhere We Go	Release date: March 2, 1999; Label: BNA; Format: CD, cassette	51	5	—	5	RIAA: 2× Platinum; MC: Gold
"—" denotes releases that did not chart.

=== 2000s albums ===
Title	Album details	Peak chart positions			Sales	Certifications (sales thresholds)
Title	Album details	US	US Country	CAN	Sales	Certifications (sales thresholds)
No Shoes, No Shirt, No Problems	Release date: April 23, 2002; Label: BNA; Format: CD, cassette	1	1	—		RIAA: 5× Platinum
All I Want for Christmas Is a Real Good Tan	Release date: October 7, 2003; Label: BNA; Format: CD, digital download	42	4	—		RIAA: Platinum
When the Sun Goes Down	Release date: February 3, 2004; Label: BNA; Format: CD, digital download	1	1	—		RIAA: 5× Platinum
Be as You Are (Songs from an Old Blue Chair)	Release date: January 25, 2005; Label: BNA; Format: CD, digital download	1	1	—	US: 1,300,000	RIAA: Platinum
The Road and the Radio	Release date: November 8, 2005; Label: BNA; Format: CD, digital download	1	1	—	US: 3,100,000	RIAA: 4× Platinum
Just Who I Am: Poets & Pirates	Release date: September 11, 2007; Label: BNA; Format: CD, digital download	3	1	7		RIAA: 2× Platinum
Lucky Old Sun	Release date: October 14, 2008; Label: Blue Chair, BNA; Format: CD, digital download	1	1	10		RIAA: Platinum
"—" denotes releases that did not chart.

=== 2010s albums ===
Title	Album details	Peak chart positions					Sales	Certifications (sales thresholds)
Title	Album details	US	US Country	AUS	CAN	NOR	Sales	Certifications (sales thresholds)
Hemingway's Whiskey	Release date: September 28, 2010; Label: Blue Chair, BNA; Format: CD, digital download	1	1	73	10	37	US: 850,000	RIAA: 2× Platinum
Welcome to the Fishbowl	Release date: June 19, 2012; Label: Blue Chair, Columbia Nashville; Format: CD, digital download	2	1	34	5	—	US: 592,000	RIAA: Platinum
Life on a Rock	Release date: April 30, 2013; Label: Blue Chair, Columbia Nashville; Format: CD, digital download	1	1	47	4	—	US: 392,000	RIAA: Gold
The Big Revival	Release date: September 23, 2014; Label: Blue Chair, Columbia Nashville; Format: CD, digital download	2	1	31	6	—	US: 447,000	RIAA: Platinum
Cosmic Hallelujah	Release date: October 28, 2016; Label: Blue Chair, Columbia Nashville; Format: CD, digital download	2	1	19	12	—	US: 239,500	RIAA: Gold
Songs for the Saints	Release date: July 27, 2018; Label: Blue Chair, Warner Bros. Nashville; Format: CD, digital download	2	1	51	8	—	US: 153,900	RIAA: Gold
"—" denotes releases that did not chart.

=== 2020s albums ===
Title	Album details	Peak chart positions				Certifications (sales thresholds)
Title	Album details	US	US Country	AUS	CAN	Certifications (sales thresholds)
Here and Now	Release date: May 1, 2020; Label: Blue Chair, Warner Nashville; Format: CD, digital download, vinyl	1	1	83	2	RIAA: Gold
Born	Release date: March 22, 2024; Label: Blue Chair, Warner Nashville; Format: CD, digital download, vinyl	20	5	—	—	
Silver Sands Marina	Release date: September 25, 2026; Label: Hey Now; Format: CD, digital download, vinyl	7	3	—	—	

== Live albums ==
Title	Album details	Peak chart positions			Sales	Certifications
Title	Album details	US	US Country	CAN	Sales	Certifications
Live: Live Those Songs Again	Release date: September 19, 2006; Label: BNA; Format: CD, digital download	4	1	—		RIAA: Gold
Live in No Shoes Nation	Release date: October 27, 2017; Label: Blue Chair, Columbia Nashville; Format: CD, digital download	1	1	18	US: 488,800	RIAA: Platinum
"—" denotes releases that did not chart.

== Compilation albums ==
Title	Album details	Peak chart positions			Certifications
Title	Album details	US	US Country	CAN	Certifications
Greatest Hits (Note: Greatest Hits also peaked at number 15 on the RPM Country Albums chart.)	Release date: September 26, 2000; Label: BNA; Format: CD, cassette	13	1	—	RIAA: 5× Platinum; MC: Gold
Super Hits	Release date: March 18, 2008; Label: Sony BMG Special Markets; Format: CD, digital download	—	52	—	
Greatest Hits II	Release date: May 19, 2009; Label: BNA; Format: CD, digital download	3	1	14	RIAA: Platinum
"—" denotes releases that did not chart.
