= Super Hits (Kenny Chesney album) =

Compilation album by Kenny Chesney
- Released: November 15, 2007
- Recorded: 1995–2002
- Genre: Country
- Length: 36:06
- Label: Sony BMG Special Markets
- Producer: Various

Kenny Chesney chronology
Just Who I Am: Poets & Pirates (2007)	Super Hits (2007)	Lucky Old Sun (2008)

Super Hits is a compilation album by country music artist Kenny Chesney. It was released on November 15, 2007 as part of Sony BMG's Super Hits series.

== Commercial performance ==
Super Hits peaked at number 52 on the US Billboard Top Country Albums chart the week of March 28, 2009.

== Track listing ==
No.	Title	Writer(s)	Length
1.	"Fall in Love"	Buddy Brock, Kenny Chesney, Kim Williams	2:37
2.	"She Thinks My Tractor's Sexy"	Paul Overstreet, Jim Collins	4:08
3.	"Me and You"	Skip Ewing, Ray Herndon	3:39
4.	"She Gets That Way"	Adam Hughes, Roger Brown	3:19
5.	"I Will Stand"	Mark Germino, Casey Beathard	3:25
6.	"Back in My Arms Again"	Cris Moore, Lee Roy Parnell, Rory Bourke	3:26
7.	"California"	Chris Lindsey, Bill Luther, Aimee Mayo	3:53
8.	"What I Need to Do"	Tom Damphier, Luther	4:05
9.	"A Chance"	Dean Dillon, Royce Porter	3:41
10.	"Never Gonna Feel Like That Again"	Overstreet, Phillip Coleman	3:53
Total length:			36:06

== Charts ==
=== Weekly charts ===
Chart (2008–2009)	Peak position
US Top Country Albums (Billboard)	52
