= All I Need to Know =

All I Need to Know may refer to:

- All I Need to Know (Kenny Chesney album), 1995
  - "All I Need to Know" (Kenny Chesney song), its title track
- "All I Need to Know" (Emma Bunton song), 2007
- "All I Need to Know", a 1983 song by Bette Midler, a cover version and alternative title of the song "Don't Know Much"
