= Keith Palmer (album) =

Studio album by Keith Palmer
- Released: November 5, 1991
- Studio: The Bennett House, Franklin, TN
- Genre: Country
- Length: 31:43
- Label: Epic
- Producer: Bob Montgomery

Keith Palmer is the debut album by American country singer-songwriter Keith Palmer. It was released on November 5, 1991 on Epic Records. Its two singles, "Don't Throw Me in the Briarpatch" and "Forgotten but Not Gone", both charted on the U.S. Billboard Hot Country Singles & Tracks chart, with the latter also charting on the Canadian country chart.

The song "When I Close My Eyes" became a top 5 hit for Kenny Chesney in 1997, charting on both country charts of the U.S. and Canada at numbers 2 and 4, respectively.

== Track listing ==
1. "Memory Lane" (Lonnie Wilson, Joe Diffie) – 3:15
2. "Forgotten but Not Gone" (Johnny MacRae, Buzz Cason) – 3:27
3. "If You Want to Find Love" (Skip Ewing, Max D. Barnes) – 2:31
4. "That's Enough to Keep Me Hangin' On" (Keith Palmer) – 3:51
5. "My Arms Tonight" (Jeff Tweel, Larry Shell) – 2:47
6. "Don't Throw Me in the Briarpatch" (Kix Brooks, Chris Waters) – 2:54
7. "She Left Me Yesterday" (Gary Harrison, Patrick Finch, Tim Mensy) – 3:31
8. "Livin' on What's Left of Your Love" (Sanger D. Shafer, Diffie) – 2:53
9. "When I Close My Eyes" (Nettie Musick, Mark Alan Springer) – 3:37
10. "I Picked a San Antonio Rose" (James Dean Hicks, Bobby P. Barker) – 2:55

== Personnel ==
As listed in liner notes.

- Jerry Douglas – Dobro
- Paul Franklin – steel guitar
- Rob Hajacos – fiddle
- Bill Hullett – acoustic guitar
- Brent Mason – electric guitar
- Tim Mensy – acoustic guitar, background vocals, arrangement
- Ron Oates – keyboards, arrangement
- Keith Palmer – vocals
- Matt Rollings – keyboards
- Jim Vest – steel guitar
- Lonnie Wilson – drums
- Bob Wray – bass
- Jonathan Yudkin – mandolin

=== Singles ===
Year	Single	Peak chart positions	
Year	Single	US Country	CAN Country
1991	"Don't Throw Me in the Briarpatch"	54	—
1992	"Forgotten but Not Gone"	60	58
"—" denotes releases that did not chart
