= Better Boat =

Single by Kenny Chesney with Mindy Smith

from the album Songs for the Saints
- Released: August 27, 2018
- Genre: Country
- Length: 3:44
- Label: Blue Chair/Warner Bros. Nashville
- Songwriter(s): Travis Meadows; Liz Rose
- Producer(s): Kenny Chesney; Buddy Cannon

Kenny Chesney singles chronology
"Get Along" (2018)	"Better Boat" (2018)	"Tip of My Tongue" (2019)

"Better Boat" is a song written by Travis Meadows and Liz Rose, and recorded by American country music singer Kenny Chesney featuring Mindy Smith. It was released in August 2018 as the second single from Chesney's album Songs for the Saints.

== Content and history ==
Chesney took inspiration from Hurricane Irma's aftermath when recording Songs for the Saints, and in a press release, he said that he felt that "Better Boat" "really captures the emotion of that moment". The song features a vocal backing from Mindy Smith, and classical guitar parts performed by Mac McAnally. Its lyrics center on overcoming adversity and finding positivity in life struggles, centered around a metaphor of building a "better boat" to navigate the sea.

Travis Meadows, who wrote the song with Liz Rose, said that he cried when he heard Chesney's rendition for the first time. Of the song's meaning, he said that "I had been in a recovery meeting, and I heard something that really changed my life. Serenity is the thing that everybody in those meetings is looking for. We as humans, we’re looking for serenity; some kind of peace of mind in this crazy blue ball we live on. It was said, ‘Serenity is not found in a calmer sea; it’s found in the building of a better boat." Meadows' own version appears on his 2017 album First Cigarette.

== Chart performance ==
"Better Boat" peaked at number 25 on Country Airplay in December 2018, accounting for Chesney's lowest peak there, and his first to miss the top 20 since "I Will Stand" reached number 27 on the same chart in 1998.

Chart performance for "Better Boat"
Chart (2018)	Peak position
Canada Country (Billboard)	49
US Country Airplay (Billboard)	25
US Hot Country Songs (Billboard)	34
