= Troy Tomlinson =

American music executive (born 1964)

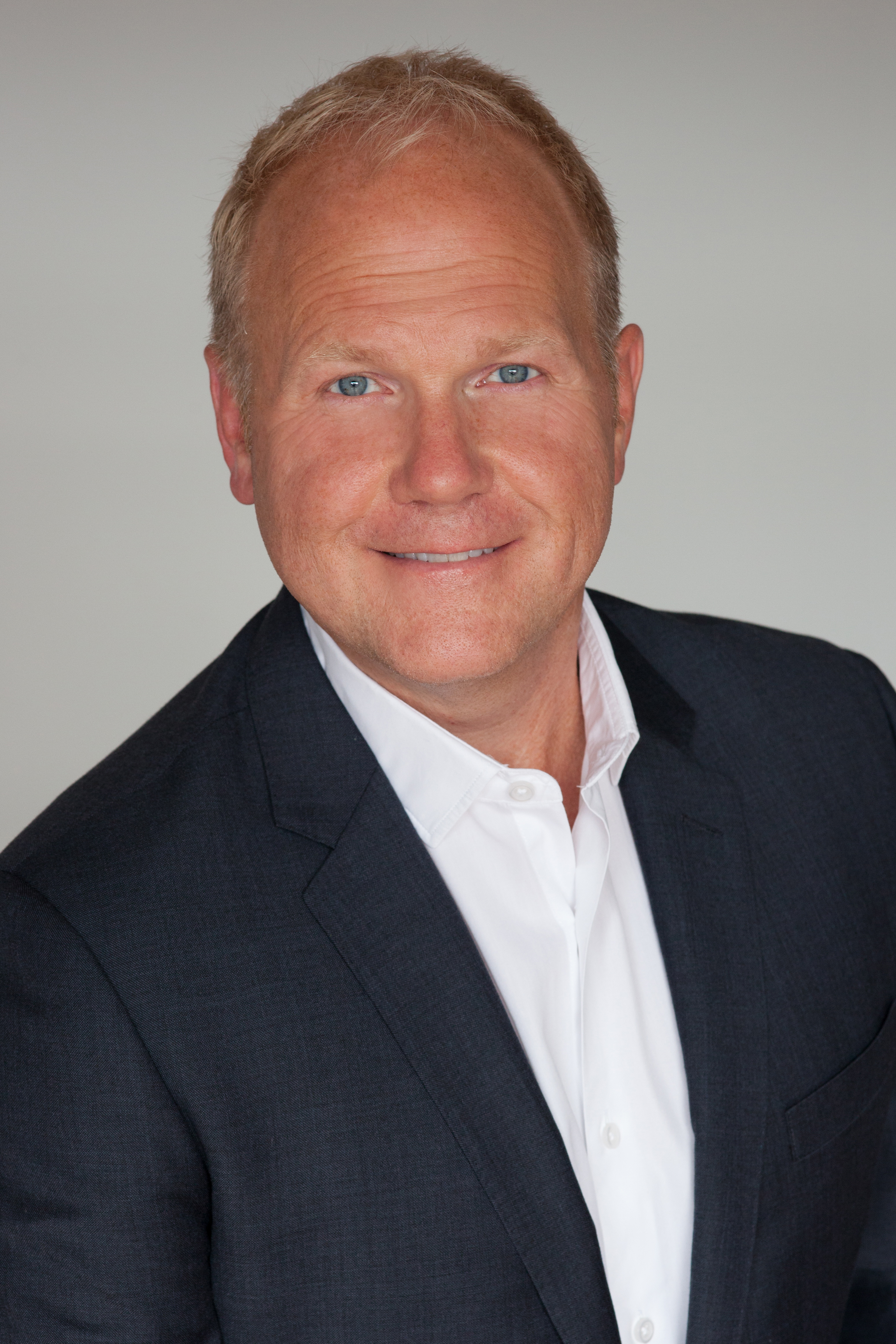
- Troy Tomlinson, 2016
- Born: Troy Vernon Tomlinson; January 18, 1964 (age 62); Portland, Tennessee, U.S.
- Occupation: Music Publisher
- Years active: 1984 - Present
- Known for: Association with: Kenny Chesney; Taylor Swift; Keith Urban; Luke Combs; Maren Morris; Scotty McCreery

Troy Tomlinson (born January 18, 1964) is an American music executive and the chairman and CEO of Universal Music Publishing Group Nashville. Upon assuming the role on July 1, 2019, Tomlinson became the first Chairman and CEO to run a major music publishing company in Nashville.

Universal Music Publishing Nashville's roster includes writer/artists Taylor Swift, Kenny Chesney, Megan Moroney, Keith Urban, Luke Combs, Sam Hunt, Maren Morris, Scotty McCreery, Brad Tursi, Ty Myers, Carter Faith, Ingrid Andress, Caylee Hammack, Shania Twain, Danielle Bradbery, Ian Munsick, Hunter Hayes, Sara Evans, Dylan Gossett, Band Loula, Cooper Alan, Dalton Davis, Benny G, Iris Copperman, John Hollier, Lukas Nelson, Jonah Kagen, Owen Riegling, Solon Holt, Presley Barker, Ava Hall, Hunter Flynn, as well as Brandy Clark.

Notable songwriters include Chase McGill, Paul DiGiovanni, Ray Fulcher, Rob Snyder, Matraca Berg, John Pierce, Jacob Davis, Shane Minor, Troy Verges, Bart Butler, Micah Wilshire, Benjy Davis, Alysa Vanderheym, Mike Robinson, Ross Ellis, Lydia Sutherland, Mark Trussell, Sean McConnell, Kyle Sturrock, Seth Ennis, Brendan Cooney, Mitch Crego, Alex Maxwell, Jon Sherwood, Zack Dyer, JR Atkins, Dave Cobb, and Mary Steenburgen.

Significant catalogs include Mark D Music, MCA Music, Almo Irving, Cedarwood/Sawgrass, Hall-Clement, PiGem/Chess, Polygram/Welk, BMG I, Zomba, MTM and ABC Music. Prominent catalog songwriters include Mark D Sanders, Bob McDill, Jim Weatherly, Jimmy Webb, Don Schlitz, Dave Loggins, Delbert McClinton, Jimmy Buffett, Tony Arata, Mike Reid, Allen Shamblin, Emmylou Harris, Charlie Daniels, K.T. Oslin, Lee Roy Parnell, and Matraca Berg.

== Personal ==
Tomlinson was born and raised in Portland, Tennessee, the son of Ella and Vernon Tomlinson. He graduated from Portland High School in 1982. Tomlinson is married, with two children and three grandchildren.

== Career ==
After high school, Tomlinson pursued what he thought was his lifelong vocation as a machinist. His first job following graduation was an apprenticeship position at a plastics company in Portland. While working there, he received second and third degree burns on both hands. At the time, a new acquaintance of his, Cliff Williamson, was searching for a trainee song-plugger at a newly formed publishing company, Multimedia Entertainment in Nashville. In 1983 Williamson hired Tomlinson.

After Multimedia was sold, one of Tomlinson's songwriters, Don King, asked Tomlinson to help him start his own company. Not long after, Muscle Shoals studio mogul Rick Hall tapped Tomlinson to run the Nashville division of Hall's publishing company, Fame Music Group.

In 1988 Tomlinson caught the attention of Jerry Bradley, who had become president of Gaylord Entertainment's 16th Avenue Records and Acuff-Rose Music Publishing. Bradley brought Tomlinson to Acuff-Rose, where he worked with famed songwriters Dean Dillon, Skip Ewing, Jim Weatherly, and Whitey Shafer, among others. Tomlinson is also credited with the discovery of Kenny Chesney, the Country Music Association's four time Entertainer of the Year. During Tomlinson's 14 years at Acuff-Rose Music Publishing, he rose through the ranks to the position of Executive Vice President of Acuff-Rose Music Publishing.

In the summer of 2002, Gaylord Entertainment sold Acuff-Rose to Sony/ATV Music Publishing, which had previously purchased Tree International, Acuff-Rose's perennial rival. Tomlinson was asked by then President/CEO, Donna Hilley, to join the company as Vice President of Creative.

In 2005, Tomlinson was appointed President/CEO of Sony/ATV Music Publishing Nashville. While continuing to work with the aforementioned artists, he has also overseen the songwriting careers of artists such as Taylor Swift, Kenny Chesney, Miranda Lambert, Luke Bryan, Eric Church, Darius Rucker, Kelsea Ballerini, Blake Shelton, Thomas Rhett, Gary Levox (Rascal Flatts), Brett Eldredge, Jon Pardi, The Band Perry, Mitchell Tenpenny, Jimmie Allen, Cole Swindell, Randy Houser, Charlie Worsham, High Valley, and Chase Rice. In addition to Sony/ATV Music Publishing's writer/artists, Tomlinson also guided the careers of hit songwriters Tom Douglas, Josh Osborne, Chris DeStefano, Ross Copperman, Jon Nite, Jaren Johnston, Lindsay Rimes, Jim Beavers, Luke Laird, Bill Anderson, and Bobby Braddock to name a few. He was responsible for stewarding the song catalogs of Hank Williams, Dolly Parton, Merle Haggard, Willie Nelson, Kris Kristofferson, Alan Jackson, Guy Clark, John Bettis, Buck Owens, Hank Cochran, Roy Acuff and the Everly Brothers.

Under Tomlinson's leadership in 2007, Sony/ATV Music Publishing Nashville became the only country music publishing company in history to win the American Society of Composers, Authors and Publishers’ (ASCAP) Country Publisher of the Year, Broadcast Music International's (BMI) Country Publisher of the Year, the Society of European Stage Authors and Composers’ (SESAC) Country Publisher of the Year, and Billboard's Publisher and Publishing Corporation of the Year, the same year.

The unprecedented accomplishment of 2005 was again attained by Sony/ATV Music Publishing in 2012, making Sony/ATV Music Publishing Nashville the only Country publisher to have ever captured "Publisher of the Year" at all three PROs in a single year. Additionally, Sony/ATV Music Publishing Nashville was named BMI's Publisher of the Year for an unprecedented 16 consecutive years, as well as Billboard's Country Publisher of the Year for the same time period.

After 17 years with Sony/ATV Music Publishing, Tomlinson left his role as president and CEO to become chairman and CEO at Universal Music Publishing Group Nashville.

Tomlinson reports to Jody Gerson, Chairman and Chief Executive Office of Universal Music Publishing Group. The two worked together at Sony/ATV Music Publishing from 2008 until Gerson joined Universal Music Publishing Group in 2015.

== Recognitions ==
In October 2014, Tomlinson was presented with the Keystone Award by the Nashville Songwriters Hall of Fame Foundation for his extraordinary efforts in bringing together Nashville's Business and Creative communities to create the first permanent home for the Nashville Songwriters Hall of Fame.

In April 2016, he was honored with Belmont University's 2016 Robert E. Mulloy Award of Excellence for his outstanding three decade career on Nashville's Music Row.

In October 2017, Tomlinson was presented with the Nashville Inspiration Award for his lifetime commitment to serving others.

In April 2024, Tomlinson was honored with the Country Music Association's Songwriter Advocate Award, recognizing him as an individual who has dedicated his life to supporting and advancing the art of songwriting and careers of songwriters.

== Activities ==
- Tennessee Entertainment Commission - Past Chairman
- Country Music Association Board of Directors – Past Chairman
- Leadership Music – Class of 1997
- Country Music Hall of Fame and Museum Board
- Country Music Foundation Board
- Belmont University Board of Trustees (Former)
- Broadcast Music, Inc. Foundation
