= Carry On (Kenny Chesney song) =

2026 song by Kenny Chesney

Single by Kenny Chesney

from the album Silver Sands Marina
- Released: May 8, 2026
- Genre: Country
- Length: 3:00
- Label: Hey Now
- Songwriters: Jessi Alexander; Matt Jenkins; Chase McGill
- Producers: Buddy Cannon; Kenny Chesney

Kenny Chesney singles chronology
"You Had to Be There" (2025)	"Carry On" (2026)	"Remember Me That Way" (2026)

Music video
- "Carry On" on YouTube

"Carry On" is a song by American country music singer Kenny Chesney. It was released on May 8, 2026, as the lead single from his twenty-first studio album, Silver Sands Marina, via Hey Now Records. The song was co-written by Jessi Alexander, Matt Jenkins, and Chase McGill, and Chesney co-produced it with Buddy Cannon.

"Carry On" is Chesney's first solo release since "Just to Say We Did" in July 2024. The song also served as the debut single for Hey Now Records, of which Chesney was signed as the flagship artist in March 2026.

== Background ==
"Carry On" was originally released in 2021 by Pryor & Lee.

Chesney announced the song on April 22, 2026, with Chesney explaining the song's meaning:

"Nothing lifts a mood like music. It's something people can find their attitude adjustment in without doing too much work. I love that this song says, 'Get out there and sing, even if you can't carry a tune in a bucket—because that's real. We don't care how you sound, we just want everybody with their hands up, singing along with everything they've got. Those songs that change your energy are everything."

Holler described the song as "unmistakably Kenny Chesney—sun-soaked, reflective, and rooted in the beach-bar storytelling that's long defined his music." The song has been compared to other hits by Chesney, including "American Kids", "Save It for a Rainy Day", and "Get Along".

A music video directed by Shaun Silva was released on May 21, 2026, featuring Chesney in Key West alongside David Wegman, who is an artist from Key West and a sailor.

== Chart performance ==
"Carry On" became Chesney's highest add day of his career, with all 158 panel stations adding the song in its first week. becoming the third song in history after Garth Brooks in 1997 with "Longneck Bottle" and Post Malone and Morgan Wallen in 2024 with "I Had Some Help", to clear the panel in its first week of release. (Note: There were 222 stations and 167 stations in 1997 and 2024, respectively.)

"Carry On" debuted on the Billboard Hot Country Songs chart at 31, marking Chesney's 100th song to enter the chart. The song received 1.5 million chart-eligible streams in the United States, 10.5 million in radio play audience, and 2,000 units sold during the week ending May 14, 2026, per Luminate. The song would become Chesney's 62nd top ten entry on the Billboard Country Airplay for the week of July 25, 2026 surpassing Tim McGraw and George Strait for the most top-ten singles on the Country Airplay chart since 1990. The song reached number one on the week ending October 10, 2026, becoming Chesney's 34th number one, as well as extending the record for the most number one single by an artist on that chart.

== Personnel ==
Credits adapted from Tidal.

=== Musicians ===
- Kenny Chesney – lead vocals
- Danny Rader – acoustic guitar, electric guitar, bouzouki, mandolin
- John Willis – acoustic guitar
- Wyatt Beard – background vocals
- Tony Lucido – bass
- Nick Buda – drums
- David Dorn – Hammond organ
- Kenny Greenberg – electric guitar
- F. Reid Shippen – programming
- David Huff – programming

=== Technical ===
- Kenny Chesney – production
- Buddy Cannon – production
- Andrew Mendelson – mastering
- F. Reid Shippen – mixing
- Tony Castle – engineer
- Andrea Boullianne – assistant engineer
- Austin Brown – assistant engineer
- Joanna Finley – assistant engineer
- Joey Stanca – assistant engineer
- Zach Kuhlman – assistant engineer
- Thomas Oakes – assistant mastering
- Brandon Towles – assistant mixing

== Charts ==
Weekly chart performance for "Carry On"
Chart (2026)	Peak position
Canada Hot 100 (Billboard)	85
Canada CHR/Top 40 (Billboard)	40
Canada Country (Billboard)	2
US Billboard Hot 100	44
US Country Airplay (Billboard)	1
US Hot Country Songs (Billboard)	14
