= I Will Stand =

Studio album by Kenny Chesney
- Released: July 15, 1997
- Recorded: 1997
- Genre: Neotraditional country
- Length: 40:05
- Label: BNA
- Producers: Buddy Cannon; Norro Wilson

Kenny Chesney chronology
| Me and You (1996) | I Will Stand (1997) | Everywhere We Go (1999) |

Singles from I Will Stand
- 1. "She's Got It All" Released: May 17, 1997; 2. "A Chance" Released: September 14, 1997; 3. "That's Why I'm Here" Released: March 1, 1998; 4. "I Will Stand" Released: August 25, 1998

Professional ratings
Review scores
| Source | Rating |
|---|---|
| Allmusic | 4.5/5 stars |

I Will Stand is the fourth studio album by American country music singer Kenny Chesney. It was released on July 15, 1997, on BNA Records. "She's Got It All" was the album's first single, as well as Chesney's first number 1 single on the Billboard country music charts. "A Chance", "That's Why I'm Here" and "I Will Stand" were all released as singles as well, peaking on the country charts at number 11, number 2, and number 27, respectively. Also included is an acoustic rendition of Chesney's 1996 single "When I Close My Eyes".

I Will Stand became Chesney's first certified Gold album. The track "Lonely, Needin' Lovin'" was previously recorded and released by Woody Lee on his 1995 Atlantic album, Get Over It.

== Musical style and composition ==
I Will Stand has been described as a neotraditional country album and has been cited as his last album firmly set in the style before he crossed over into a more contemporary country pop influenced musical style.

== Critical reception ==
Stephen Thomas Erlewine rated the album four-and-a-half stars out of five on AllMusic, opining that Chesney began to find his musical personality on the album.

== Track listing ==
| No. | Title | Writer(s) | Length |
|---|---|---|---|
| 1. | "She's Got It All" | Craig Wiseman, Drew Womack | 3:23 |
| 2. | "You Win, I Win, We Lose" | Buddy Brock, Kenny Chesney, Donny Kees | 3:25 |
| 3. | "She Gets That Way" | Adam Hughes, Roger Brown | 3:19 |
| 4. | "I Will Stand" | Mark Germino, Casey Beathard | 3:25 |
| 5. | "That's Why I'm Here" | Mark Springer, Shaye Smith | 4:01 |
| 6. | "Steamy Windows" | Tony Joe White | 4:29 |
| 7. | "From Hillbilly Heaven to Honky Tonk Hell" (featuring George Jones and Tracy Lawrence) | Mike Geiger, Woody Mullis, Michael Huffman | 4:21 |
| 8. | "She Always Says It First" | Chesney, Dean Dillon | 2:51 |
| 9. | "Lonely, Needin' Lovin'" | Chesney, Brock, Kees | 3:33 |
| 10. | "A Chance" | Dillon, Royce Porter | 3:41 |
| 11. | "When I Close My Eyes" (acoustic version) | Nettie Musick, Springer | 3:38 |
| Total length: | | | 40:05 |

== Personnel ==
As listed in liner notes.

- Eddie Bayers – drums
- Kenny Bell – acoustic guitar
- Shannon Brown – background vocals
- Larry Byrom – acoustic guitar
- Melonie Cannon – background vocals
- Kenny Chesney – lead vocals
- Glen Duncan – fiddle, mandolin
- Sonny Garrish – Dobro, steel guitar
- Steve Gibson – electric guitar
- Rob Hajacos – fiddle
- Randy Howard – fiddle
- Roy Huskey Jr. – upright bass
- Kirk "Jellyroll" Johnson – harmonica
- George Jones – vocals on track 7
- Tracy Lawrence – vocals on track 7
- Brent Mason – electric guitar
- Rodger Morris – piano, synthesizer
- Farrell Morris – percussion
- Steve Nathan – synthesizer, vibraphone
- William "Ozzy" Osment – fiddle
- Larry Paxton – bass guitar
- Matt Rollings – piano, Hammond B-3 organ
- John Wesley Ryles – background vocals
- Pete Wade – gut string guitar
- Cindy Richardson-Walker – background vocals
- Biff Watson – acoustic guitar
- Dennis Wilson – background vocals
- Lonnie Wilson – drums
- Norro Wilson – percussion
- Curtis Young – background vocals
- Reggie Young – electric guitar

== Charts ==
=== Weekly charts ===
| Chart (1997) | Peak position |
|---|---|
| US Billboard 200 | 95 |
| US Top Country Albums (Billboard) | 10 |

=== Year-end charts ===
| Chart (1997) | Position |
|---|---|
| US Top Country Albums (Billboard) | 75 |
| Chart (1998) | Position |
| US Top Country Albums (Billboard) | 27 |

=== Singles ===
| Year | Single | Peak chart positions | | | Certifications (sales threshold) |
| Year | Single | US Country | US | CAN Country | Certifications (sales threshold) |
|---|---|---|---|---|---|
| 1997 | "She's Got It All" | 1 | 110 | 1 | RIAA: Platinum |
| 1997 | "A Chance" | 11 | — | 17 | |
| 1998 | "That's Why I'm Here" | 2 | 79 | 9 | |
| 1998 | "I Will Stand" | 27 | 101 | 33 | |
"—" denotes releases that did not chart.

== Certifications ==
| Region | Certification | Certified units/sales |
|---|---|---|
| United States (RIAA) | Platinum | 1,000,000^{^} |
^{^} Shipments figures based on certification alone.
