= Silver Sands Marina =

Studio album by Kenny Chesney
- Released: September 25, 2026
- Length: 35:44
- Label: Hey Now
- Producers: Buddy Cannon; Kenny Chesney

Kenny Chesney chronology
Born (2024)	Silver Sands Marina (2026)

Singles from Silver Sands Marina
- 1. "Carry On" Released: May 8, 2026; 2. "Remember Me That Way" Released: September 28, 2026

Silver Sands Marina is the twenty-first studio album by American country music singer Kenny Chesney. It was released on September 25, 2026, via Hey Now Records. Chesney co-produced the album alongside long-time collaborator Buddy Cannon.

The album is Chesney's debut project for the recently-founded Hey Now Records, which he became the flagship artist of in March 2026. It is also the third album in Chesney's career, behind 1996's Me and You and 2007's Just Who I Am: Poets & Pirates, where he was not a writer or co-writer on any of the tracks.

== Background ==
Chesney announced his twenty-first album, Silver Sands Marina, on June 24, 2026. Alongside the album's announcement, he released the title track.

The album's lead single, "Carry On", was released on May 8, 2026, and became the first independent single and the third-ever song to close out the panel in its first week.

Chesney collaborated with notable Nashville songwriters, including Matraca Berg, Shane McAnally, Brett James, and Jessie Jo Dillon. The album also features collaborations with fellow artists Colbie Caillat, Lily Meola, and Megan Moroney. The album marks Chesney's second collaboration with Moroney, as the pair released "You Had to Be There" in 2025.

== Track listing ==
Silver Sands Marina track listing
No.	Title	Writer(s)	Length
1.	"Burn My Boat"	Casey Beathard; Tucker Beathard; Ryan Tyndell	3:00
2.	"Carry On"	Jessi Alexander; Matt Jenkins; Chase McGill	3:00
3.	"Talkin' Dirt"	Joe Clemmons; Jaren Johnston; Brad Tursi	2:55
4.	"Goldfish" (featuring Lily Meola)	Gordie Sampson; Tia Sillers; Tenille Townes	3:04
5.	"Silver Sands Marina"	Johnny Clawson; Kyle Sturrock	3:57
6.	"It Just Got Weird" (featuring Megan Moroney)	Jessie Jo Dillon; Donovan Woods	3:40
7.	"Sad Casino"	Matraca Berg; Brett James	3:33
8.	"Shot a Car into Space"	Adam Chaffins; Brittany Taylor Hamilton; Adam Wright	3:05
9.	"Remember Me That Way"	Zach Abend; Michael Hardy; Shane McAnally	3:27
10.	"What We Got Going On" (with Colbie Caillat)	Mark Irwin; Liz Hengber; Chris Tompkins	2:49
11.	"Shot Glass"	James; Tony Lane	3:14
Total length:			35:44

== Personnel ==
Credits are adapted from Tidal.

=== Musicians ===
- Kenny Chesney – lead vocals
- Danny Rader – acoustic guitar (tracks 1, 2, 4, 6–11), mandolin (2, 4), bouzouki (2, 5, 8), electric guitar (2, 7–9), guitjo (3, 8), hi-string guitar (5, 7), guitar (5)
- Tony Lucido – bass
- Kenny Greenberg – electric guitar (all tracks), acoustic guitar (7)
- Nick Buda – drums (1–6, 8–11), percussion (6, 11)
- David Dorn – synthesizer (1, 3, 5, 6, 11), piano (1, 5, 6, 11), Hammond B3 organ (2, 3, 10, 11)
- Wyatt Beard – background vocals (1, 2, 4, 5, 8, 9, 11)
- David Huff – programming (2–4, 9, 10)
- F. Reid Shippen – programming (2, 3, 5)
- John Willis – acoustic guitar (2, 5)
- Jaren Johnston – background vocals, electric guitar (3)
- Jeff Taylor – accordion (4, 8)
- Bobby Terry – steel guitar (4, 9–11)
- Lily Meola – background vocals (4)
- Kat Higgins – background vocals (5, 8)
- Megan Moroney – background vocals (6)
- Michael Rojas – Hammond B3 organ (7–9), synthesizer (7, 9), piano (7)
- Brett James – background vocals (7)
- Chad Cromwell – drums (7)
- Pat Buchanan – electric guitar (7)
- Dan Dugmore – steel guitar (7)
- Sam Bacco – percussion (8, 11)
- Hardy – background vocals (9)
- Colbie Caillat – vocals, background vocals (10)

=== Technical ===
- Kenny Chesney – production
- Buddy Cannon – production
- Tony Castle – engineering
- Jaren Johnston – additional engineering (3)
- David Huff – additional engineering (9)
- Zach Kuhlman –engineering assistance (1–3, 5, 11)
- Andrew Boullianne – engineering assistance (1–3)
- Austin Brown – engineering assistance (1, 2, 6, 9)
- Joey Stanca – engineering assistance (2, 8)
- Michelle Freetly – engineering assistance (4, 6–8, 10)
- Steve Cordray – engineering assistance (4, 8, 10)
- Grant Morgan – engineering assistance (5, 11)
- Grant Wilson – engineering assistance (5)
- Trent Woodman – engineering assistance (5)
- F. Reid Shippen – mixing
- Brandon Towles – mixing assistance
- Andrew Mendelson – mastering
- Adam Battershell – mastering assistance
- Andrew Darby – mastering assistance
- Luke Armentrout – mastering assistance
- Thomas Oakes – mastering assistance
- Shannon Finnegan – production coordination

== Charts ==
Chart performance for Silver Sands Marina
Chart (2026)	Peak position
UK Album Downloads (Official Charts)	98
US Billboard 200	7
US Top Country Albums (Billboard)	3
