= Get Along (Kenny Chesney song) =

Single by Kenny Chesney

from the album Songs for the Saints
- Released: April 6, 2018
- Genre: Country
- Length: 3:19
- Label: Blue Chair; Warner Bros. Nashville
- Songwriters: Shane McAnally; Ross Copperman; Josh Osborne
- Producers: Kenny Chesney; Buddy Cannon

Kenny Chesney singles chronology
"Everything's Gonna Be Alright" (2017)	"Get Along" (2018)	"Better Boat" (2018)

"Get Along" is a song written by Shane McAnally, Ross Copperman, and Josh Osborne and recorded by American country music artist Kenny Chesney. It was released in April 2018 as the first single from Chesney's 2018 album Songs for the Saints. It was also Chesney's first single to be released from Warner Bros. Records, which he signed to following a 20-year affiliation with Sony Music Nashville.

== Content ==
Shane McAnally, Ross Copperman, and Josh Osborne wrote "Get Along", which Rolling Stone Country describes as a song that "encourages altruism in a world that only gets more complicated when one strays from savoring the simple pleasures." The song is Chesney's first release for the Nashville division of Warner Bros. Records, following an affiliation with Sony Music Nashville's BNA and Columbia Nashville divisions which lasted more than 20 years. Chesney told Nash Country Daily that "When I heard this song, beyond how good the rhythm felt, I was amazed how simply they broke all this stuff down. Get along...find the common ground...know the basic stuff is where the joy, the love, the happiness is."

Chesney performed the song live on the Academy of Country Music awards ceremony on April 15, 2018.

== Commercial performance ==
"Get Along" debuted at number 37 on the US Billboard Hot Country Songs chart during its first week of release. The next week, after Chesney performed it the ACM Awards, the song then jumped up to number 11. As of September 2018, it has sold 282,000 copies in the United States.

== Charts ==
=== Weekly charts ===
Chart (2018)	Peak position
Canada Hot 100 (Billboard)	47
Canada Country (Billboard)	1
US Billboard Hot 100	22
US Country Airplay (Billboard)	1
US Hot Country Songs (Billboard)	2

=== Year-end charts ===
Chart (2018)	Position
US Billboard Hot 100	87
US Country Airplay (Billboard)	2
US Hot Country Songs (Billboard)	8

== Certifications ==
Region	Certification	Certified units/sales
Canada (Music Canada)	Platinum	80,000^{‡}
United States (RIAA)	3× Platinum	3,000,000^{‡}
^{‡} Sales+streaming figures based on certification alone.
