= Grandpa Told Me So =

Single by Kenny Chesney

from the album All I Need to Know
- B-side: "Whatever It Takes"
- Released: November 13, 1995
- Recorded: 1995
- Genre: Country
- Length: 4:17
- Label: BNA
- Songwriters: Mark Alan Springer; James Dean Hicks
- Producer: Barry Beckett

Kenny Chesney singles chronology
"All I Need to Know" (1995)	"Grandpa Told Me So" (1995)	"Back in My Arms Again" (1996)

"Grandpa Told Me So" is a song written by Mark Alan Springer and James Dean Hicks, and recorded by American country music artist Kenny Chesney. It was released in November 1995 as the third and final single from the album All I Need to Know. The song reached number 23 on the Billboard Hot Country Singles & Tracks chart.

== Chart performance ==
"Grandpa Told Me So" debuted at number 75 on the U.S. Billboard Hot Country Singles & Tracks for the week of November 6, 1995.

Chart (1995–1996)	Peak position
Canada Country Singles (RPM)	17
US Hot Country Songs (Billboard)	23
