= Be as You Are (Songs from an Old Blue Chair) =

Studio album by Kenny Chesney
- Released: January 25, 2005
- Recorded: June 29, 2004
- Studios: Emerald Sound (Nashville, Tennessee); Starstruck (Nashville, Tennessee); Westwood
- Genres: Country, Gulf and Western
- Length: 55:07
- Label: BNA
- Producers: Buddy Cannon; Kenny Chesney

Kenny Chesney chronology
When the Sun Goes Down (2004)	Be as You Are (Songs from an Old Blue Chair) (2005)	The Road and the Radio (2005)

Professional ratings
Aggregate scores
Source	Rating
Metacritic	(63/100)
Review scores
Source	Rating
About.com	4/5 stars
AllMusic	4/5 stars
BBC Music	(average)
Blender	4/5 stars
Entertainment Weekly	C
Los Angeles Times	2/4 stars
People	2/4 stars
Plugged In (publication)	(unfavorable)
Robert Christgau	(dud)
Rolling Stone	2/5 stars
Stylus Magazine	B−

Be as You Are (Songs from an Old Blue Chair) is the ninth studio album by American country music singer Kenny Chesney, released on January 25, 2005. The album debuted at number one album on the US Billboard 200 chart.

The album's opening track was originally recorded by Chesney on his When the Sun Goes Down album. This album was intended by Chesney to be a side project, and it produced no singles, although "Guitars and Tiki Bars" reached number 53 on the Hot Country Songs charts based on unsolicited airplay.

== Track listing ==
All tracks are written by Kenny Chesney, with additional co-writers as noted.

No.	Title	Writer(s)	Length
1.	"Old Blue Chair"		3:24
2.	"Be as You Are"	Dean Dillon	4:19
3.	"Guitars and Tiki Bars"	Dillon; Mark Tamburino	4:36
4.	"Island Boy"	Phil Vassar; Tamburino	3:56
5.	"Somewhere in the Sun"	Daryl Hobb; Tim Holly; Danny Tucker	4:45
6.	"Boston"	Tamburino	4:16
7.	"Something Sexy About the Rain"	Skip Ewing	5:24
8.	"French Kissing Life"		4:02
9.	"Key Lime Pie"	Bill Anderson; Buddy Cannon	4:40
10.	"Sherry's Living in Paradise"	Clayton Mitchell	3:20
11.	"Magic"		4:40
12.	"Soul of a Sailor"	Dillon; Scotty Emerick	4:14
13.	"Old Blue Chair" (ocean mix)		3:31
Total length:			55:07

== Personnel ==
As listed in liner notes

- Wyatt Beard – background vocals
- David Briggs – piano, keyboards, B3 organ
- Mat Britain – steel drums
- Pat Buchanan – electric guitar, harmonica
- Buddy Cannon – background vocals
- Murray Cannon – background vocals
- Kenny Chesney – acoustic guitar, lead vocals
- J. T. Corenflos – electric guitar, gut string guitar, nylon string guitar
- Chad Cromwell – drums
- Eric Darken – percussion
- Robert Greenidge – steel drums
- Tim Hensley – background vocals
- Steve Herman – trumpet
- John Hobbs – piano, keyboards, B3 organ
- Jim Hoke – tenor saxophone, penny whistle
- Jim Horn – tenor saxophone
- John Jorgenson – electric guitar
- Paul Leim – drums, percussion, shaker
- B. James Lowry – acoustic guitar, electric guitar, nylon string guitar, steel guitar
- Randy McCormick – piano, keyboards, B3 organ, wurlitzer electric piano
- Liana Manis – background vocals
- Larry Paxton – bass guitar, fretless bass, background vocals
- Tom Roady – percussion, tambourine
- Amy Joe Stelzer – intro to "Key Lime Pie"
- Mark Tamburino – intro to "Key Lime Pie"
- Quentin Ware Jr. – trumpet
- Tommy White – Dobro
- John Willis – acoustic guitar, electric guitar, gut string guitar, nylon string guitar

== Charts ==
=== Weekly charts ===
Chart (2005)	Peak position
US Billboard 200	1
US Top Country Albums (Billboard)	1

=== Year-end charts ===
Chart (2005)	Position
US Billboard 200	56
US Top Country Albums (Billboard)	11

== Certifications ==
Region	Certification	Certified units/sales
United States (RIAA)	Platinum	1,000,000^{^}
^{^} Shipments figures based on certification alone.
