= Keith Palmer (singer) =

American singer-songwriter

- Born: June 23, 1957
- Origin: Hayti, Missouri, U.S.
- Died: June 13, 1996 (aged 38) White House, Tennessee, U.S.
- Genres: Country
- Occupation: Singer-songwriter
- Instrument: Vocals
- Years active: 1975–1992
- Label: Epic

Keith Palmer (June 23, 1957 – June 13, 1996) was an American country music singer. He was born Bryon Keith Palmer on June 23, 1957, in Hayti, Missouri, United States, and was raised in Corning, Arkansas. His name was actually supposed to be "Byron", but there was a mistake on the birth certificate.

He began his music career in 1975 as pianist for the Dixie Echoes, where he remained for three years. In 1991, Palmer released his self-titled debut album for Epic Records which produced two singles: "Don't Throw Me in the Briarpatch" and "Forgotten but Not Gone", both of which entered the U.S. Hot Country Singles & Tracks chart (now Hot Country Songs). A song from the album, "When I Close My Eyes", later became a hit for Kenny Chesney in 1997. Palmer also co-wrote Reba McEntire's 1991 hit single "For My Broken Heart".

Palmer died of cancer on June 13, 1996, in White House, Tennessee, at age 38.

== Discography ==
=== Albums ===
- Keith Palmer (1991), Epic

=== Singles ===
Year	Single	Peak chart positions	
Year	Single	US Country	CAN Country
1991	"Don't Throw Me in the Briarpatch"	54	—
1992	"Forgotten but Not Gone"	60	58
"—" denotes releases that did not chart
