= That's Why I'm Here (song) =

Single by Kenny Chesney

from the album I Will Stand
- B-side: "A Chance"
- Released: March 1, 1998
- Recorded: 1997
- Genre: Country
- Length: 4:01
- Label: BNA 65399
- Songwriters: Mark Alan Springer; Shaye Smith
- Producers: Buddy Cannon; Norro Wilson

Kenny Chesney singles chronology
"A Chance" (1997)	"That's Why I'm Here" (1998)	"I Will Stand" (1998)

"That's Why I'm Here" is a song written by Mark Alan Springer and Shaye Smith and recorded by American country music artist Kenny Chesney. It was released in March 1998 as the third single from Chesney’s 1997 album I Will Stand. The song became Chesney's sixth Top 10 hit on the U.S. Billboard Hot Country Songs chart, reaching No. 2.

== Content ==
Chesney told Billboard magazine that the song was his favorite on the album. "The thing that is so cool about this song is that it's about an alcoholic that's struggling to get better, but it has a happy ending and there's a lot of hope in this song."

== Music video ==
The music video was directed by Martin Kahan, and premiered on CMT on December 25, 1997, during the channel’s Delivery Room video block broadcast, three months before the single's release.

== Chart positions ==
Chart (1998)	Peak position
Canada Country Singles (RPM)	9
US Billboard Hot 100	79
US Hot Country Songs (Billboard)	2

=== Year-end charts ===
Chart (1998)	Position
Canada Country Tracks (RPM)	94
US Country Songs (Billboard)	20
