= I Will Stand (song) =

Single by Kenny Chesney

from the album I Will Stand
- B-side: "She Always Said It First"
- Released: August 25, 1998
- Recorded: 1997
- Genre: Country
- Length: 3:25
- Label: BNA
- Songwriters: Mark Germino; Casey Beathard
- Producers: Buddy Cannon; Norro Wilson

Kenny Chesney singles chronology
"That's Why I'm Here" (1998)	"I Will Stand" (1998)	"How Forever Feels" (1998)

"I Will Stand" is a song written by Mark Germino and Casey Beathard and recorded by American country music artist Kenny Chesney. It was released in August 1998 as the fourth and final single and title track from Chesney’s 1997 album of the same name.

== Chart positions ==
Chart (1998)	Peak position
Canada Country Singles (RPM)	33
US Bubbling Under Hot 100 (Billboard)	1
US Hot Country Songs (Billboard)	27
