= A Chance =

Single by Kenny Chesney

from the album I Will Stand
- B-side: "When I Close My Eyes"
- Released: September 14, 1997
- Recorded: 1997
- Genre: Country
- Length: 3:41
- Label: BNA
- Songwriters: Dean Dillon; Royce Porter
- Producers: Buddy Cannon; Norro Wilson

Kenny Chesney singles chronology
"She's Got It All" (1997)	"A Chance" (1997)	"That's Why I'm Here" (1998)

"A Chance" is a song written by Dean Dillon and Royce Porter and recorded by American country music artist Kenny Chesney. It was released in September 1997 as the second single from Chesney's 1997 album I Will Stand. The song reached number 11 on the US Billboard Hot Country Singles & Tracks chart.

== Chart performance ==
Chart (1997–1998)	Peak position
Canada Country Singles (RPM)	17
US Hot Country Songs (Billboard)	11
