= She's Got It All =

Single by Kenny Chesney

from the album I Will Stand
- B-side: "Lonely, Needin' Lovin'"
- Released: May 17, 1997
- Recorded: 1997
- Genre: Country
- Length: 3:23
- Label: BNA
- Songwriters: Craig Wiseman; Drew Womack
- Producers: Buddy Cannon; Norro Wilson

Kenny Chesney singles chronology
"When I Close My Eyes" (1996)	"She's Got It All" (1997)	"A Chance" (1997)

"She's Got It All" is a song written by Craig Wiseman and Drew Womack and recorded by American country music artist Kenny Chesney. It was released in May 1997 as the first single from Chesney's 1997 album I Will Stand. The song became Chesney's first number one hit on the US Billboard Hot Country Singles & Tracks chart.

== Chart positions ==
Chart (1997)	Peak position
Canada Country Singles (RPM)	1
US Bubbling Under Hot 100 (Billboard)	10
US Hot Country Songs (Billboard)	1

=== Year-end charts ===
Chart (1997)	Position
Canada Country Tracks (RPM)	25
US Country Songs (Billboard)	9

== Certifications ==
Certifications for She's Got It All
Region	Certification	Certified units/sales
United States (RIAA)	Platinum	1,000,000^{‡}
^{‡} Sales+streaming figures based on certification alone.
