= When I Close My Eyes (Keith Palmer song) =

Single by Kenny Chesney

from the album Me and You
- B-side: "My Poor Old Heart"
- Released: December 16, 1996
- Genre: Country; soft rock
- Length: 3:29
- Label: BNA 64726
- Songwriters: Nettie Musick; Mark Alan Springer
- Producer: Barry Beckett

Kenny Chesney singles chronology
"Me and You" (1996)	"When I Close My Eyes" (1996)	"She's Got It All" (1997)

"When I Close My Eyes" is a country music song written by Nettie Musick and Mark Alan Springer. It was originally recorded by Keith Palmer on his 1991 self-titled debut album, and later by Restless Heart singer Larry Stewart on his 1993 debut album Down the Road. Kenny Chesney later recorded it on his 1996 album, Me and You. Released in December 1996 as that album's third and final single, it peaked at No. 2 on the Hot Country Singles & Tracks (now Hot Country Songs) chart, giving Chesney his fifth top 40 country hit. Rhonda Vincent later covered the song on her album Back Home Again in 2000.

== Critical reception ==
Stephen Thomas Erlewine of AllMusic described Kenny Chesney's rendition of the song as "a great soft rock crossover, tuneful and easy but never forced and not dripping with sentiment." Deborah Evans Price of Billboard magazine reviewed the song favorably, calling it "another pretty ballad." Price also described the production as having "a simple, understated quality that places the focus on the lovelorn lyric and Chesney's evocative vocals."

== Chart performance ==
"When I Close My Eyes" was the third and final single from Chesney's 1996 album Me and You. It debuted at number 74 on the Hot Country Songs chart dated December 21, 1996. Having charted for 21 weeks on that chart, it peaked at number 2 on the country chart dated April 19, 1997, behind Clay Walker's "Rumor Has It".

Chart (1996–1997)	Peak position
Canada Country Singles (RPM)	4
US Hot Country Songs (Billboard)	2

=== Year-end charts ===
Chart (1997)	Position
Canada Country Tracks (RPM)	55
US Country Songs (Billboard)	40

== Alternate versions ==
Chesney recorded an acoustic version of the song on his 1997 album I Will Stand.
