= Fall in Love (Kenny Chesney song) =

Single by Kenny Chesney

from the album All I Need to Know
- B-side: "Something About You and a Dirt Road"
- Released: March 20, 1995
- Recorded: 1995
- Genre: Country
- Length: 2:37
- Label: BNA 64278
- Songwriters: Buddy Brock; Kenny Chesney; Kim Williams
- Producer: Barry Beckett

Kenny Chesney singles chronology
"Somebody's Callin'" (1994)	"Fall in Love" (1995)	"All I Need to Know" (1995)

"Fall in Love" is a song co-written and recorded by American country music artist Kenny Chesney. It was released in March 1995 as the lead single from his album All I Need to Know. The song became Chesney's first Top 10 hit, peaking at number 6 in both the United States and Canada. Chesney wrote the song with Buddy Brock and Kim Williams.

== Critical reception ==
Larry Flick, of Billboard magazine reviewed the song unfavorably saying that Chesney "seems somewhat straightjacketed by this sunny pop song." He tells the label to let Chesney "sink his teeth into some hardcore country."

== Music video ==
The music video was directed by Steven T. Miller and R. Brad Murano, and premiered on CMT on March 24, 1995, when CMT named it a "Hot Shot".

== Chart positions ==
"Fall in Love" debuted at number 66 on the U.S. Billboard Hot Country Singles & Tracks for the week of April 1, 1995.

Chart (1995)	Peak position
Canada Country Singles (RPM)	6
US Hot Country Songs (Billboard)	6

=== Year-end charts ===
Chart (1995)	Position
Canada Country Tracks (RPM)	76
US Country Songs (Billboard)	55
