= All I Want for Christmas Is a Real Good Tan =

Studio album by Kenny Chesney
- Released: October 7, 2003
- Recorded: 2003
- Studios: Emerald Sound (Nashville, Tennessee); Pedernales Recording (Spicewood, Texas)
- Genres: Country, Christmas
- Length: 42:50
- Label: BNA
- Producers: Buddy Cannon; Kenny Chesney; Norro Wilson

Kenny Chesney chronology
No Shoes, No Shirt, No Problems (2002)	All I Want for Christmas Is a Real Good Tan (2003)	When the Sun Goes Down (2004)

Professional ratings
Review scores
Source	Rating
About.com	5/5 stars
AllMusic	3/5 stars

All I Want for Christmas Is a Real Good Tan is the seventh studio album by American country music singer Kenny Chesney. The album was released on October 7, 2003. The album was certified gold by the Recording Industry Association of America (RIAA) for sales of over 500,000 copies in the United States. As of December 2016, the album has sold 922,900 copies in the United States.

In addition to original tracks and tropical renditions of traditional Christmas music, the album features three covers. "Christmas in Dixie" was originally recorded by Alabama and features Alabama's lead singer, Randy Owen, as a duet partner. "Thank God for Kids" was previously recorded by The Oak Ridge Boys (and originally by Eddy Raven), while "Pretty Paper" was originally recorded by Willie Nelson. Chesney's rendition of "Silent Night" features his mother and her twin sister, who are credited as the Grigsby Twins.

== Track listing ==
No.	Title	Writer(s)	Length
1.	"All I Want for Christmas Is a Real Good Tan"	Paul Overstreet	4:38
2.	"Jingle Bells"	Traditional	2:52
3.	"I'll Be Home for Christmas"	Buck Ram, Kim Gannon, Walter Kent	3:53
4.	"Christmas in Dixie" (featuring Randy Owen)	Jeff Cook, Teddy Gentry, Randy Owen, Mark Herndon	3:38
5.	"Thank God for Kids"	Eddy Raven	3:10
6.	"Silver Bells"	Ray Evans, Jay Livingston	4:05
7.	"Just a Kid"	Skip Ewing, Kent Blazy	4:20
8.	"The Angel at the Top of My Tree"	Buddy Cannon, Kenny Chesney, Dean Dillon	3:26
9.	"Pretty Paper" (featuring Willie Nelson)	Willie Nelson	3:47
10.	"Silent Night" (featuring the Grigsby Twins)	Traditional	4:43
11.	"O Little Town of Bethlehem"	Traditional	4:18

== Personnel ==
- Wyatt Beard – background vocals
- Shannon Brown – background vocals
- Pat Buchanan – electric guitar
- Melonie Cannon – background vocals
- Mark Casstevens – ukulele
- Karen Chandler – background vocals
- Kenny Chesney – lead vocals
- Chip Davis – background vocals
- Grigsby Twins – vocals on "Silent Night"
- Tim Hensley – banjo, background vocals
- Wes Hightower – background vocals
- John Hobbs – Hammond organ, piano, synthesizer
- Nicholas Hoffman – fiddle, background vocals
- John Jorgenson – electric guitar, ukulele
- Paul Leim – cabasa, drums, percussion, shaker, timbales
- Randy McCormick – Hammond organ, piano, synthesizer, background vocals
- Liana Manis – background vocals
- The Nashville String Machine – strings
- Willie Nelson – vocals on "Pretty Paper"
- Paul Overstreet – background vocals
- Randy Owen – vocals on "Christmas in Dixie"
- Steve Patrick – trumpet
- Larry Paxton – bass guitar, upright bass, string arrangements
- Gary Prim – Wurlitzer
- Glen Rose – background vocals
- Shaun Silva – background vocals
- Allison Stewart – background vocals
- Kyle Stewart – background vocals
- Mark Tamburino – background vocals
- Kris Wilkinson – string arrangements
- John Willis – acoustic guitar, gut string guitar

== Charts ==
=== Weekly charts ===
Chart (2003)	Peak position
US Billboard 200	42
US Top Country Albums (Billboard)	4
US Top Holiday Albums (Billboard)	3

=== Year-end charts ===
Chart (2003)	Position
US Top Country Albums (Billboard)	75
Chart (2004)	Position
US Top Country Albums (Billboard)	44

== Certifications ==
Region	Certification	Certified units/sales
United States (RIAA)	Platinum	922,900
