= Mark Germino =

American songwriter (1950–2024)

- Born: August 12, 1950
- Origin: North Carolina, U.S.
- Died: July 3, 2024 (aged 73)
- Genres: Folk rock Country
- Occupation: Singer-songwriter
- Instrument(s): Vocals rhythm guitar
- Years active: 1971–2024
- Labels: RCA, Winter Harvest, Atomic Office

Mark Germino (August 12, 1950 – July 3, 2024) was an American folk rock and country singer-songwriter. Born in North Carolina, he initially worked as a poet before moving into folk rock songwriting; by 1974, he had moved to Nashville. Initially, he did not plan to become a singer, although he eventually bought a guitar and took up singing as well, as he decided that singing was easier than reciting poetry.

The Song "Lean on Jesus (Before He Leans on You)" co-written by Germino with Rob Stanley and sung by Paul Craft reached No. 55 on the Billboard country chart in 1977. Germino moved on to performing in Nashville clubs at night, while working by day as a truck driver. By 1981, he was signed to a songwriting contract; five years later, RCA Records signed him as a recording artist. Between 1986 and 1991, he recorded two solo albums for the label (1986's London Moon and Barnyard Remedies and 1987's Caught in the Act of Being Ourselves; a third album for the label, 1991's Radartown, featured a backing band called The Sluggers. His third solo album, 1995's Rank and File, was issued independently.

"Broken Man's Lament" from the London Moon and Barnyard Remedies album has been recorded and released by Emmylou Harris on her album All I Intended to Be. Germino also co-wrote the singles "Bill's Laundromat, Bar and Grill" for Confederate Railroad and "I Will Stand" for Kenny Chesney. "Rex Bob Lowenstein", a song about an independently minded radio DJ who rebels against being given a playlist by his boss, taken from "Caught in the Act of Being Ourselves", was particularly admired and much played on BBC Radio 1 by British DJ Roger Scott and is a personal favourite of BBC Radio 2 DJ Bob Harris.

Germino died on July 3, 2024, at the age of 73.

== Discography ==
- London Moon and Barnyard Remedies (1986, RCA, PL85852)
- Caught in the Act of Being Ourselves (1987, RCA, PL86608)
- Radartown (1991, RCA, PD90550) (as Mark Germino and The Sluggers)
- Radartown (1991, Zoo Entertainment, BMG 7-2445-11002-2) (as Mark Germino and The Sluggers)
- Economics (1991, Zoo Entertainment, BMG ZP-17004-2) (as Mark Germino and The Sluggers) Promo for Radartown [plus live recording of Highway 61 Revisited]
- Rex Bob Lowenstein (1991, Zoo Entertainment, BMG ZP-17019-2) (as Mark Germino and The Sluggers) Promo for Radartown
- Rank and File (1995, Winter Harvest, WH3303)
- Atomic Candlestick (2006, Atomic Office Records, 044–001) (as Mark Germino and the Grenade Angels)
- Midnight Carnival (2021)
