= Me and You (Kenny Chesney song) =

Single by Kenny Chesney

from the album Me and You
- B-side: "I Finally Found Somebody"
- Released: July 22, 1996
- Recorded: 1995
- Genre: Country
- Length: 3:40
- Label: BNA 64589
- Songwriters: Skip Ewing; Ray Herndon
- Producer: Barry Beckett

Kenny Chesney singles chronology
"Back in My Arms Again" (1996)	"Me and You" (1996)	"When I Close My Eyes" (1996)

"Me and You" is a song written by Skip Ewing and Ray Herndon, the latter of whom was a former guitarist of the band McBride & the Ride. It was recorded by American country music singer, Kenny Chesney, who included it on two albums: All I Need to Know (1995) and Me and You (1996). It was released in July 1996 as the second single and title track from the latter album, peaking at number 2 on the US country singles charts in 1996.

== Content ==
"Me and You" is a mid-tempo ballad in which the male narrator tells how he and his life partner complement each other. The song's main accompaniment comes from piano and a string section, with some pedal steel guitar flourishes.

== Music video ==
The music video was directed by Chuck Kuhn, and premiered on CMT on July 26, 1996, during "The CMT Delivery Room". It was the first video of his career where Chesney had a haircut. It shows Chesney singing the song on a front porch, as well as interacting with various people. The video was shot in the town of Colton, Washington.

== History ==
Chesney first recorded the song for his 1995 album All I Need to Know and in 1996 included it on his third studio album, Me and You. The song was released as a single in 1996 from the latter album.

== Chart positions ==
"Me and You" debuted at number 68 on the Billboard Hot Country Singles & Tracks (now Hot Country Songs) charts dated for the week of July 20, 1996. The song spent twenty weeks on that chart, peaking at number 2 on the chart week of November 2, behind Clint Black's "Like the Rain". It also spent six weeks on the Bubbling Under Hot 100, peaking at number 12 on that chart (equivalent to number 112 on the Billboard Hot 100).

Chart (1996)	Peak position
Canada Country Singles (RPM)	6
US Bubbling Under Hot 100 (Billboard)	12
US Hot Country Songs (Billboard)	2

=== Year-end charts ===
Chart (1996)	Position
Canada Country Tracks (RPM)	75
US Country Songs (Billboard)	37

== Certifications ==
Certifications for Me and You
Region	Certification	Certified units/sales
United States (RIAA)	Platinum	1,000,000^{‡}
^{‡} Sales+streaming figures based on certification alone.
