= Me and You (Kenny Chesney album) =

Studio album by Kenny Chesney
- Released: June 4, 1996
- Recorded: 1995–96
- Studios: Masterfonics, Nashville, TN
- Genre: Country
- Length: 36:27
- Label: BNA
- Producer: Barry Beckett

Kenny Chesney chronology
All I Need To Know (1995)	Me and You (1996)	I Will Stand (1997)

Singles from Me and You
- 1. "Back in My Arms Again" Released: April 7, 1996; 2. "Me and You" Released: July 22, 1996; 3. "When I Close My Eyes" Released: December 16, 1996

Professional ratings
Review scores
Source	Rating
Allmusic	3/5 stars

Me and You is the third studio album by American country music singer Kenny Chesney. It was released in 1996 via BNA Records. Although its lead-off single "Back in My Arms Again" failed to make Top 40, the album's title track and "When I Close My Eyes" both reached number two on the US Billboard Hot Country Singles & Tracks (now Hot Country Songs) charts in 1996. The title track was reprised from Chesney's previous album, All I Need to Know. "Back Where I Come From" is a cover of Mac McAnally's 1990 single from his album Simple Life, while "When I Close My Eyes" had been recorded by Restless Heart lead singer Larry Stewart on his 1993 debut album Down the Road, and by Keith Palmer before that. "It's Never Easy to Say Goodbye" had been recorded by singer Wynonna Judd on her eponymous debut album. "Back in My Arms Again" was previously recorded by its co-writer, Lee Roy Parnell, on his 1992 album Love Without Mercy.

The album is the first in Chesney's career where he did not write or co-write any of the tracks.

== Track listing ==
No.	Title	Writer(s)	Length
1.	"Back in My Arms Again"	Cris Moore, Lee Roy Parnell, Rory Bourke	3:26
2.	"Ain't That Love"	Kostas	3:14
3.	"When I Close My Eyes"	Nettie Musick, Mark Alan Springer	3:29
4.	"Back Where I Come From"	Mac McAnally	3:56
5.	"Turn for the Worse"	Billy Yates, Frank Dycus, Kerry Kurt Phillips	2:37
6.	"Me and You"	Skip Ewing, Ray Herndon	3:39
7.	"(Turn Out the Light And) Love Me Tonight"	Bob McDill	2:12
8.	"Another Friday Night"	Zack Turner, Tim Nichols, Mark D. Sanders	2:36
9.	"No Small Miracle"	Pat Terry, Mickey Cates	3:30
10.	"My Poor Old Heart"	Shawn Camp, Gary Harrison	3:07
11.	"It's Never Easy to Say Goodbye"	Allen Shamblin, Bernie Nelson	4:42
Total length:			36:27

== Personnel ==
As listed in liner notes

- Mandy Barnett - background vocals
- Eddie Bayers - drums
- Barry Beckett - keyboards
- Kenny Chesney - acoustic guitar, lead vocals
- Paul Franklin - steel guitar
- "Cowboy" Eddie Long - steel guitar
- Terry McMillan - percussion, harmonica
- Phil Naish - keyboards
- Bobby Ogdin - keyboards
- Don Potter - acoustic guitar
- Michael Rhodes - bass guitar
- Brent Rowan - electric guitar
- John Wesley Ryles - background vocals
- Joe Spivey - fiddle
- Dennis Wilson - background vocals
- Curtis "Mr. Harmony" Young - background vocals

== Charts ==
=== Weekly charts ===
Chart (1996)	Peak position
US Billboard 200	78
US Top Country Albums (Billboard)	9
US Top Heatseekers (Billboard)	1

=== Singles ===
Year	Single	Peak chart positions			Certifications (sales threshold)
Year	Single	US Country	US	CAN Country	Certifications (sales threshold)
1996	"Back in My Arms Again"	41	—	30	
1996	"Me and You"	2	112	8	RIAA: Platinum
1996	"When I Close My Eyes"	2	—	4	
"—" denotes releases that did not chart.

== Certifications ==
Region	Certification	Certified units/sales
United States (RIAA)	Platinum	1,000,000^{^}
^{^} Shipments figures based on certification alone.
