= All I Need to Know (Kenny Chesney song) =

Single by Kenny Chesney

from the album All I Need to Know
- B-side: "Someone Else's Hog"
- Released: July 18, 1995
- Recorded: 1995
- Genre: Country
- Length: 3:09
- Label: BNA 64347
- Songwriters: Mark Alan Springer; Steve Seskin
- Producer: Barry Beckett

Kenny Chesney singles chronology
"Fall in Love" (1995)	"All I Need to Know" (1995)	"Grandpa Told Me So" (1995)

"All I Need to Know" is a song written by Steve Seskin and Mark Alan Springer, and recorded by American country music artist Kenny Chesney. It was released in July 1995 as the second single and title track from his album of the same name. It peaked at number 8 in both the United States and Canada.

== Content ==
The song is a positive ballad about the strength and security found in enduring love.

== Critical reception ==
Deborah Evans Price, of Billboard magazine reviewed the song favorably saying that "Chesney delivers a strong performance." She states that Chesney's "voice has a down to earth warmth that can make the listeners feel that [he] is relating to their own stories."

== Music video ==
The music was directed by Chuck Kuhn, and premiered on CMT on July 22, 1995, when CMT named it a "Hot Shot". It was the last video where Chesney had a mullet.

== Chart positions ==
"All I Need to Know" debuted at number 65 on the U.S. Billboard Hot Country Singles & Tracks for the week of July 29, 1995. It became his second Top 10 hit on the US Hot Country Songs Chart with a peak of #8.

Chart (1995)	Peak position
Canada Country Singles (RPM)	8
US Hot Country Songs (Billboard)	8

=== Year-end charts ===
Chart (1995)	Position
US Country Songs (Billboard)	74
