= Songs for the Saints =

Studio album by Kenny Chesney
- Released: July 27, 2018
- Genre: Country
- Length: 43:15
- Labels: Blue Chair; Warner Bros. Nashville
- Producers: Chesney; Buddy Cannon

Kenny Chesney chronology
Cosmic Hallelujah (2016)	Songs for the Saints (2018)	Here and Now (2020)

Singles from Songs for the Saints
- 1. "Get Along" Released: April 6, 2018; 2. "Better Boat" Released: August 27, 2018

Songs for the Saints is the eighteenth studio album by American country music singer Kenny Chesney. It was released on July 27, 2018 via Warner Bros. Nashville and Blue Chair Records. The album's content was inspired by Hurricane Irma.

== Content ==
The album is Chesney's first release for Warner Bros. Nashville, to which he signed in early 2018. Chesney produced it with longtime producer Buddy Cannon. "Get Along" was released on April 6, 2018 as the first single. Chesney co-wrote five of the twelve songs on the album. Ziggy Marley performs duet vocals on "Love for Love City", Jimmy Buffett appears on a cover of his own "Trying to Reason with Hurricane Season", and Mindy Smith provides backing vocals on "Better Boat". Lord Huron's "Ends of the Earth" is also covered on the album.

According to Chesney, the album was inspired by "the rebuilding process" after Hurricane Irma, which destroyed a house that he owned in Saint John, U.S. Virgin Islands. Proceeds from the album will be donated to Hurricane Irma disaster relief funds.

== Critical reception ==
Annie Reuter of Sounds Like Nashville gave the album a positive review, praising the "heartfelt and vivid lyrics" and the "stripped down and introspective" nature of the album. Newsday reviewer Glenn Gamboa rated it 3 out of 4 stars, stating that "Chesney's artistic stretch may not give him his usual collection of chart-toppers...However, Songs for the Saints is about so much more than that, a way for Chesney to work his way through the aftermath of Hurricane Irma." Stephen Thomas Erlewine of Allmusic rated it 4 out of 5, praising the "warm, hazy vibe" and introspective nature, calling it "one of Chesney's best records".

== Commercial performance ==
Songs for the Saints debuted at number two on the US Billboard 200 with 77,000 album-equivalent units, including 65,000 pure album sales. It is Chesney's 15th consecutive top 10 album in the US. It sold a further 16,300 copies the second week. As of July 2019, the album has sold 153,900 copies in the United States.

== Track listing ==
No.	Title	Writer(s)	Length
1.	"Song for the Saints"	Kenny Chesney; Tom Douglas; Scooter Carusoe	3:38
2.	"Every Heart"	Shane McAnally; Josh Osborne	3:54
3.	"Get Along"	McAnally; Osborne; Ross Copperman	3:19
4.	"Pirate Song"	Chesney; Jon Randall	4:18
5.	"Love for Love City" (featuring Ziggy Marley)	Chesney; Carusoe	3:49
6.	"Ends of the Earth"	Ben Schneider	4:24
7.	"Gulf Moon"	John Baumann	3:18
8.	"Island Rain"	Chesney; Mac McAnally	4:27
9.	"Trying to Reason with Hurricane Season" (featuring Jimmy Buffett)	Buffett	4:09
10.	"We're All Here"	Chesney; Casey Beathard; David Lee Murphy	4:15
11.	"Better Boat" (featuring Mindy Smith)	Travis Meadows; Liz Rose	3:44

== Personnel ==
- Sam Bacco - percussion
- Eddie Bayers - drums
- Wyatt Beard - background vocals
- Mark Beckett - drums, percussion
- Jimmy Buffett - duet vocals on "Trying to Reason With Hurricane Season"
- Buddy Cannon - background vocals
- Melonie Cannon - background vocals
- Tony Castle - programming
- Kenny Chesney - lead vocals
- Ross Copperman - background vocals
- Chad Cromwell - drums
- Eric Darken - percussion
- Kenny Greenberg - electric guitar
- Robert Greenidge - steel drums
- David Huff - programming
- Ziggy Marley - duet vocals on "Love for Love City"
- Mac McAnally - acoustic guitar, background vocals
- Josh Osborne - background vocals
- Danny Rader - banjo, bouzouki, acoustic guitar, electric guitar
- Jon Randall - background vocals
- Mickey Raphael - harmonica
- Mike Rojas - Hammond organ, piano, synthesizer
- F. Reid Shippen - programming
- Jimmie Lee Sloas - bass guitar
- Mindy Smith - duet vocals on "Better Boat"
- Derek Wells - electric guitar
- John Willis - 12-string acoustic guitar, acoustic guitar, gut string guitar

== Charts ==
=== Weekly charts ===
Chart (2018)	Peak position
Australian Albums (ARIA)	51
Canadian Albums (Billboard)	8
Scottish Albums (Official Charts)	92
Swiss Albums (Schweizer Hitparade)	91
UK Country Albums (Official Charts)	4
US Billboard 200	2
US Top Country Albums (Billboard)	1

=== Year-end charts ===
Chart (2018)	Position
US Top Country Albums (Billboard)	35
Chart (2019)	Position
US Top Country Albums (Billboard)	75

== Certifications ==
Region	Certification	Certified units/sales
United States (RIAA)	Gold	500,000^{‡}
^{‡} Sales+streaming figures based on certification alone.
