= All I Need to Know (album) =

All I Need To Know

Studio album by Kenny Chesney
- Released: June 13, 1995
- Recorded: 1995
- Studios: Masterfonics, Sound Stage (Nashville)
- Genre: Country
- Length: 30:20
- Label: BNA
- Producer: Barry Beckett

Kenny Chesney chronology
In My Wildest Dreams (1994)	All I Need To Know (1995)	Me and You (1996)

Singles from All I Need to Know
- 1. "Fall in Love" Released: March 13, 1995; 2. "All I Need to Know" Released: July 18, 1995; 3. "Grandpa Told Me So" Released: November 6, 1995

Professional ratings
Review scores
Source	Rating
Allmusic	4/5 stars

All I Need to Know is the second studio album by American country music singer Kenny Chesney. It was released on June 13, 1995, as his first album for BNA Records after leaving Capricorn Records in 1994. It features the singles "Fall in Love", the title track, and "Grandpa Told Me So"; these songs peaked at number six, number eight, and number 23, respectively, on the Billboard country charts in 1995.

== Content ==
This album's recording of "The Tin Man" was previously released on Chesney's 1994 album In My Wildest Dreams. "Me and You", co-written by McBride & the Ride guitarist Ray Herndon, was later included on Chesney's 1996 album of the same name, from which it was released as a single. "Paris, Tennessee" was originally recorded by Tracy Lawrence on his 1991 album Sticks and Stones, and later by Dennis Robbins (who co-wrote it) on his 1992 album Man with a Plan.

== Track listing ==
No.	Title	Writer(s)	Length
1.	"Fall in Love"	Buddy Brock, Kenny Chesney, Kim Williams	2:37
2.	"Grandpa Told Me So"	Mark Alan Springer, James Dean Hicks	4:18
3.	"The Bigger the Fool (The Harder the Fall)"	Larry Cordle, Jim Rushing	2:46
4.	"All I Need to Know"	Springer, Steve Seskin	3:09
5.	"Honey, Would You Stand by Me"	Bob McDill	2:48
6.	"Someone Else's Hog"	Chesney, David Lowe	2:36
7.	"Me and You"	Skip Ewing, Ray Herndon	3:39
8.	"Between Midnight and Daylight"	Sanger D. Shafer, Chesney	2:40
9.	"Paris, Tennessee"	Bob DiPiero, John Scott Sherrill, Dennis Robbins	2:23
10.	"The Tin Man"	Stacey Slate, Chesney, Lowe	3:26
Total length:			30:20

== Personnel ==
- Eddie Bayers – drums
- Barry Beckett – keyboards
- Kenny Chesney – acoustic guitar, lead vocals
- "Cowboy" Eddie Long – steel guitar
- Terry McMillan – harmonica, percussion
- Phil Naish – keyboards
- Bobby Ogdin – keyboards
- Don Potter – acoustic guitar
- Michael Rhodes – bass guitar
- Brent Rowan – electric guitar
- Ricky Skaggs – background vocals
- Joe Spivey – fiddle
- Harry Stinson – background vocals
- Dennis Wilson – background vocals
- Curtis Young – background vocals

== Charts ==
=== Weekly charts ===
Chart (1995)	Peak position
US Top Country Albums (Billboard)	39
US Top Heatseekers (Billboard)	9

=== Singles ===
Year	Single	Peak chart positions	
Year	Single	US Country	CAN Country
1995	"Fall in Love"	6	6
1995	"All I Need to Know"	8	8
1995	"Grandpa Told Me So"	23	17

== Certifications ==
Region	Certification	Certified units/sales
United States (RIAA)	Gold	500,000^{^}
^{^} Shipments figures based on certification alone.
