= Kenny Chesney =

American country musician (born 1968)

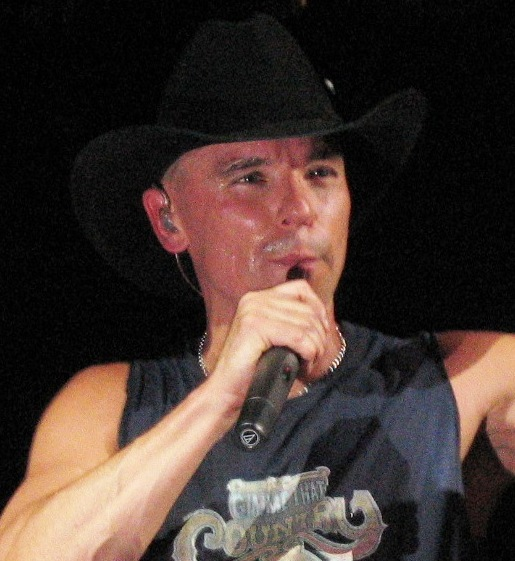
- Chesney performing in 2007
- Born: Kenneth Arnold Chesney; March 26, 1968 (age 58); Knoxville, Tennessee, U.S.
- Education: East Tennessee State University (BA)
- Occupations: Singer; musician; songwriter
- Years active: 1993–present
- Spouse: Renée Zellweger (m. 2005; ann. 2005)
- Musical career
- Genres: Country; country rock; gulf and western; neotraditional country (early)
- Instruments: Vocals; guitar
- Labels: Capricorn; BNA; Columbia Nashville; Warner Nashville; Blue Chair; Hey Now
- Website: kennychesney.com

Kenneth Arnold Chesney (born March 26, 1968) is an American country singer. With 30 million albums sold worldwide, he released his debut, In My Wildest Dreams, in 1994, and has since released 19 follow-ups. His albums spawned 27 singles that have peaked within the top 40 of the Billboard Hot 100.

Chesney has received twelve Country Music Association Awards, including the Country Music Association Award for Entertainer of the Year honor four times, and eleven Academy of Country Music Awards, including four consecutive Academy of Country Music Award for Entertainer of the Year from 2005 to 2008, as well as six Grammy Award nominations. He has remained the highest-grossing live country music artist of all time.

On March 25, 2025, Chesney was named a member-elect to the Country Music Hall of Fame, and he was officially inducted on October 19, along with Tony Brown and June Carter Cash.

== Early life ==
Chesney was born on March 26, 1968, in Knoxville, Tennessee, United States, at St. Mary's Medical Center and was raised in Luttrell. He is of English and Irish descent. He is the son of David Chesney, a former elementary school teacher, and Karen Chandler, a hair stylist in the Knoxville area. Chesney has one sibling, a younger sister named Jennifer Chandler. In 1986, Chesney graduated from Gibbs High School, where he played baseball and football. He received his first guitar for Christmas and began teaching himself how to play it.

Chesney studied advertising at East Tennessee State University in Johnson City, where he was a member of the ETSU Bluegrass Program and the Lambda Chi Alpha fraternity and graduated in 1990. In 1989, he recorded a self-released demo album, Good Old Boy At Heart at the Classic Recording Studio in Bristol, Virginia. He sold 1,000 copies while performing at the local clubs in Johnson City and used the money from album sales to help himself buy a new guitar.

After graduation from East Tennessee State in 1990, he moved to Nashville, Tennessee, where he performed at several local clubs. In March 1991, he passed an audition to sing at The Bluebird Cafe. He became the resident performer at The Turf, a honky tonk bar in the city's historic district.

== Career ==
=== 1990s ===
In 1992, the head of writer relations at BMI, Clay Bradley, recommended Chesney to his friend, Troy Tomlinson, at Opryland Music Group. Chesney performed five songs during his audition for Tomlinson. Chesney left the audition with a songwriter's contract. A year later, an appearance at a songwriter's showcase led to a contract with Capricorn Records, which had recently started a country division.

Chesney's debut album, In My Wildest Dreams, was released on the independent Capricorn Records label in April 1994. The album's first two singles, "Whatever It Takes" and "The Tin Man", both reached the lower regions of the U.S. Billboard Hot Country Singles & Tracks chart. The album sold approximately 10,000 copies before Capricorn Records closed its country music division in Nashville later that year and moved to Atlanta.

In June 1995, Chesney signed with BNA Records, and released his second studio album, All I Need to Know. The album produced three singles. "Fall in Love" and the title track both reached the Top 10, while "Grandpa Told Me So" peaked at number 23. That same year, Chesney co-wrote Confederate Railroad's single "When He Was My Age" from their album When and Where. Chesney utilized musicians playing the fiddle and pedal steel guitar throughout this album, as he felt this would highlight the open-country, "down-home" feelings in his music; fiddle and pedal steel further helped to compliment his eastern-Tennessean accent and "twang" heard in his singing and inflections. One of the intentions behind the record was to capture the "traditional" spirit that had made early country music so popular.

Chesney's third studio album and his second major-label one, titled Me and You, was released in June 1996. Its first single, "Back In My Arms Again", peaked just outside the Top 40 on the country charts, while both the title track (which Chesney had recorded on his previous album) and "When I Close My Eyes" (previously recorded by Keith Palmer on his 1991 debut album and then by Larry Stewart on his 1993 debut album Down the Road) peaked at number 2. Me and You was Chesney's first album to be certified gold by the Recording Industry Association of America (RIAA), it has since been certified platinum. It was also his first to reach the U.S. Mainstream Billboard 200 charts peaking at 78. A cover of Mac McAnally's 1990 single "Back Where I Come From" was also included on this album. Even though Chesney's version was never released as a single, it has been regularly performed during his concerts.

Chesney was honored with the 1997 Academy of Country Music's New Male Vocalist of the Year award.

I Will Stand, Chesney's fourth album and his third from BNA Records, followed in July 1997. The album's first single, "She's Got It All", became Chesney's first number one hit on the Billboard country charts and spent three weeks at that position. The album's second single, "A Chance", peaked just shy of the Top 10. The third single, "That's Why I'm Here", peaked at number 2 in 1998. He also went on his first headlining tour in support of the album. The album has since been certified platinum by the RIAA.

Everywhere We Go, Chesney's fourth album from BNA, was released in March 1999. That album produced two consecutive number one hits with "How Forever Feels" and "You Had Me from Hello" (the latter inspired by a line in the movie Jerry Maguire). The album also produced two more singles with "She Thinks My Tractor's Sexy" and "What I Need to Do", which peaked at numbers 11 and 8 on the country charts, respectively. Everywhere We Go was Chesney's first album to be certified platinum. The album marked a departure from his original neotraditional country sound, to his more familiar country pop or tropical rock sound he has since become known for.

=== 2000s ===
In September 2000, Chesney released his Greatest Hits compilation album. It included four new tracks, as well as updated versions of "Fall in Love", "The Tin Man", and "Back Where I Come From". The new version of "The Tin Man" was one of the disc's three singles, along with two of the new tracks, "I Lost It" and "Don't Happen Twice". In 2001, he performed with Kid Rock at a Waylon Jennings tribute concert covering Waylon's song "Luckenbach Texas".

The album No Shoes, No Shirt, No Problems was released in April 2002. Its lead-off single, "Young", peaked at number 2, while the follower "The Good Stuff" spent seven weeks at number 1 and became Billboard's number one country song of the year for 2002. The album also became his first to top both the Billboard 200 and the Top Country Albums Chart. In June 2002, the video for "Young" was honored by CMT with the Video of the Year and Male Video of the Year awards. A Lot of Things Different originally written by Bill Anderson, was the third single from the album and peaked at number 6. Big Star, released January 2003, was the fourth single released from the album and peaked at number 2 seven weeks later. In May 2003, ACM honored Chesney as Top Male Vocalist of the Year, while "The Good Stuff" received the award for Single Record of the Year. In April 2004, title track won the Hottest Video of the Year at the CMT awards, given to the fan-voted "sexiest" clip. No Shoes, No Shirt, No Problems has since been certified platinum 5x.

In October 2003, Chesney recorded All I Want for Christmas Is a Real Good Tan. The album's title track peaked at No. 30 on the country charts from holiday airplay. Other notable work Chesney did in 2003 is that he co wrote Kid Rock's single "Cold and Empty" from his self-titled 6th studio album, Kid Rock.

In February 2004, Chesney released When the Sun Goes Down. The album once again topped both the Billboard 200 and Top Country Albums charts. The record won album of the year at the 2004 Country Music Association Awards. Its lead-off single, "There Goes My Life", spent seven weeks at number one on the Billboard country charts. On April 21, 2004, the accompanying music video for that song was honored by CMT with the Male Video of the Year award. The album's title track, a duet with Uncle Kracker, also went to number one. The music video for the album's third single, "I Go Back", was honored on April 11, 2005, with Country Music Television's Male Video of the Year Award. This song, along with the album's fourth single, "The Woman with You", both peaked at number two. The fifth single, "Anything But Mine", reached number one, and the final single, "Keg in the Closet", peaked to number six. When the Sun Goes Down has since been certified platinum 5x.

In 2004, Chesney collaborated with one of his personal heroes, Jimmy Buffett, on a remake of Hank Williams' single "Hey Good Lookin' (with Clint Black, Alan Jackson, Toby Keith, and George Strait), and a second song "License To Chill". Both songs are on Buffett's 2004 album License To Chill. "Hey Good Lookin' garnered Chesney his first Grammy nomination for Best Country Collaboration With Vocals at the 47th Annual Grammy Awards.

In January 2005, Chesney released the album Be as You Are (Songs from an Old Blue Chair), supporting it with his Somewhere in the Sun Tour. Be as You Are is composed mostly of ballads. The album qualified for RIAA Platinum and entered the top of both mainstream country and pop music.

In May 2005, Chesney was honored with the prestigious Triple-Crown Award presented by the Academy of Country Music. This award was presented after Chesney's 2004 Academy of Country Music's Entertainer of the Year award was combined with 1997's New Male Vocalist of the Year award and 2003's Top Male Vocalist of the Year award.

Chesney's next album, The Road and the Radio, released in November 2005, debuted at number one the Billboard 200 and produced five singles. "Living in Fast Forward", "Summertime", and "Beer in Mexico" all reached number one, while "Who You'd Be Today" and "You Save Me" both broke the Top 5. Chesney promotes his beliefs of perfection, as getting songs right in the studio, ultimately leads to performing it right on the road and on the radio. The album became his third straight to top both the Billboard 200 and the Top Country Albums Chart. It has since been certified platinum 4x by the RIAA.

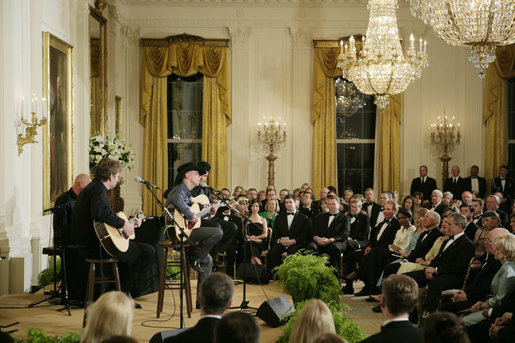
Kenny Chesney performing in the East Room of the White House on May 16, 2006, at the official dinner for Australian Prime Minister John Howard and Mrs. Janette Howard

In May 2006, Chesney was honored with his second Entertainer of the Year at the Academy of Country Music Awards.

Live: Live Those Songs Again, Chesney's first live album was released in September 2006, via BNA Records. This album includes live renditions of 15 songs, 11 of which were singles. "Live Those Songs", "Never Gonna Feel Like That Again", "On the Coast of Somewhere Beautiful", and "Back Where I Come From" were never released by Chesney as singles, although "Back Where I Come From" was released as a single from Mac McAnally's 1990 album Simple Life.

In 2006, Chesney, along with Tim McGraw, contributed to a version of Tracy Lawrence's single "Find Out Who Your Friends Are", which can be found on his album For the Love. The official single version, only featuring Lawrence's vocals, was released in August 2006 but did not reach the Top 40 on the country charts until January 2007, when 'the album was released. After the album's release, the version with him, Chesney, and McGraw began receiving significant airplay, boosting the single to No. 1 on the country charts. The song became Lawrence's first No. 1 single in 11 years, as well as the second-slowest climbing No. 1 single in the history of the Billboard music charts.

In 2007, with Neil Thrasher and Wendell Mobley, Chesney also co-wrote Rascal Flatts' 2007 single "Take Me There", which served as the lead-off single to their album Still Feels Good.

In 2007, Chesney also recorded a duet with Reba McEntire on her album Reba: Duets. "Every Other Weekend" peaked at No. 15 on the Billboard Hot Country Songs chart and No. 104 on the Billboard Bubbling Under Hot 100 Singles chart. The album has sold 2.1 million copies world-wide and is certified Platinum by the RIAA for sales of over 1 million. "Every Other Weekend" was the final single from the album. He also embarked on his Flip-Flop Summer Tour.

In November 2007, Chesney was named the CMA Entertainer of the Year for the third time in four years. Also in November 2007, the compilation Super Hits album was released as part of Sony BMG's Super Hits series.

In September 2007, Chesney released the album Just Who I Am: Poets & Pirates. This album represented a move to a more Gulf and Western sound with a number of "breezy, steel-drum island songs". It placed third in album sales that week, behind Graduation by Kanye West and Curtis by 50 Cent. The lead-off single from the album was "Never Wanted Nothing More", written by Ronnie Bowman and Chris Stapleton. It reached number one Billboard country charts. On the U.S. Billboard Hot Country Songs chart dated for the week ending on September 15, 2007, the album's second single "Don't Blink" debuted at No. 16, setting a new record for the highest debut on that chart since the inception of SoundScan electronic tabulation in 1990, although the record was broken the following week by "More Than a Memory" by Garth Brooks. The third single, "Shiftwork" (a duet with George Strait) peaked at No. 2 on the country charts. In June 2008, the fourth and final single, "Better as a Memory", became Chesney's fourteenth number one hit. The album topped the U.S. country charts, and also became his first to chart on the Billboard Canadian Albums peaking a number 7.

"Shiftwork" was later nominated for Best Country Collaboration With Vocals at the 51st Annual Grammy Awards.

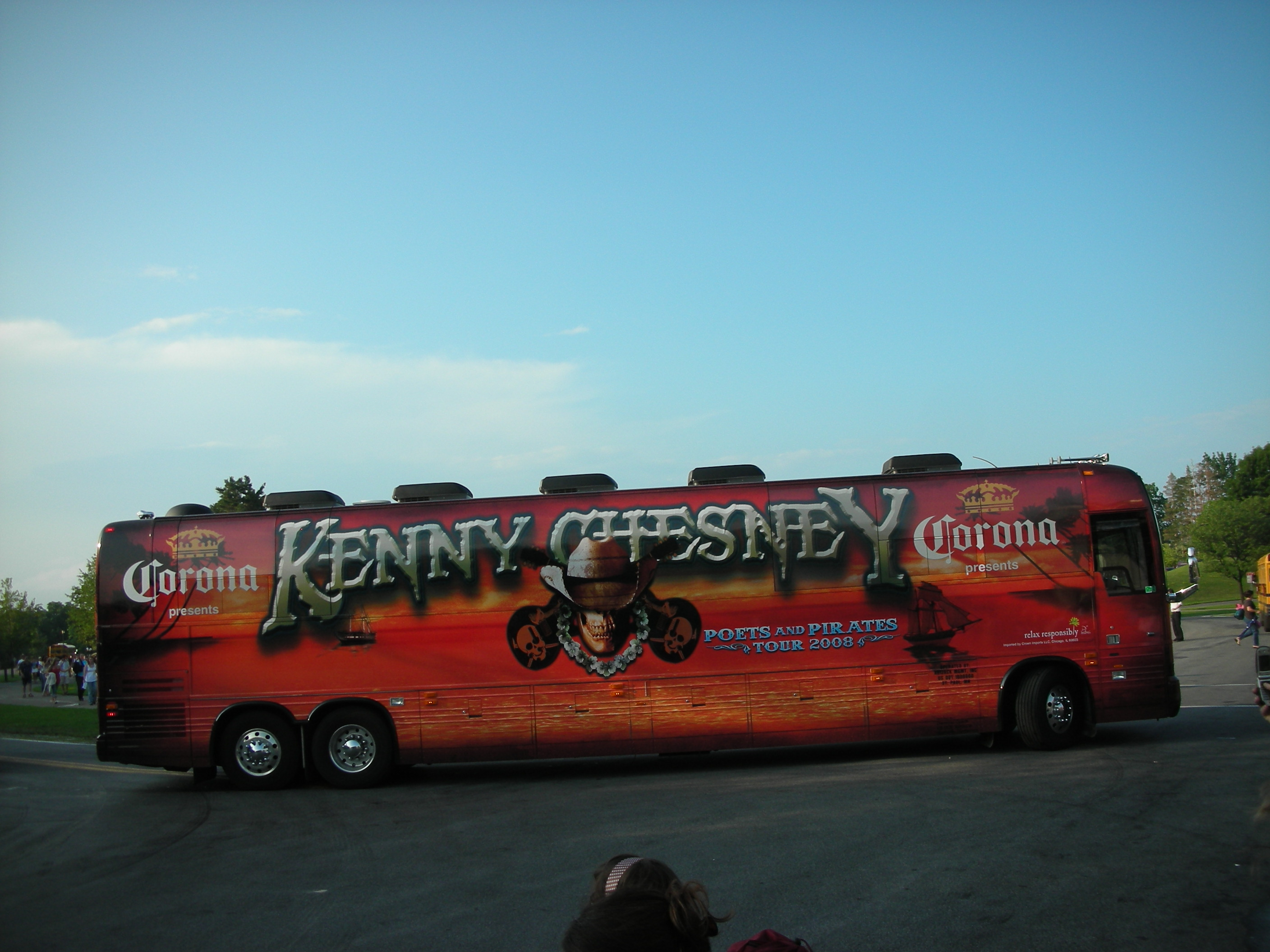
Kenny Chesney's Poets and Pirates tour bus in 2008

Chesney started his Poets and Pirates Tour on April 26, 2008, at Williams-Brice Stadium in Columbia, South Carolina. During the introduction of his set, his boot got caught between a hydraulic lift and the lip of the stage surface, which crushed his foot causing a severe hematoma in the ankle; most of the damage was centering within his toes. It took about 30 seconds for Chesney to pry his foot loose as he squatted down on the stage while the band continued to play an extended introduction of the song. When Chesney finally freed himself, he stood up and held his hand on his knee as he began singing. Chesney did not acknowledge the injury during the early part of his performance. However, he was visibly limping and seemed to rest near a drum riser while leaning over and holding his knee during the instrumental breaks of his songs. As he came offstage, a doctor from the University of South Carolina cut off Chesney's cowboy boot and immediately began treating the foot injury. X-rays that were taken afterwards revealed several crushed bones in his right foot. Chesney did not cancel any shows due to the injury.

On May 19, 2008, just a day after being honored as the ACM Entertainer of the Year at the 43rd Annual Academy of Country Music Awards, Chesney criticized the change in the awards process to awarding the honor based on fan votes and not determined by music industry professionals.

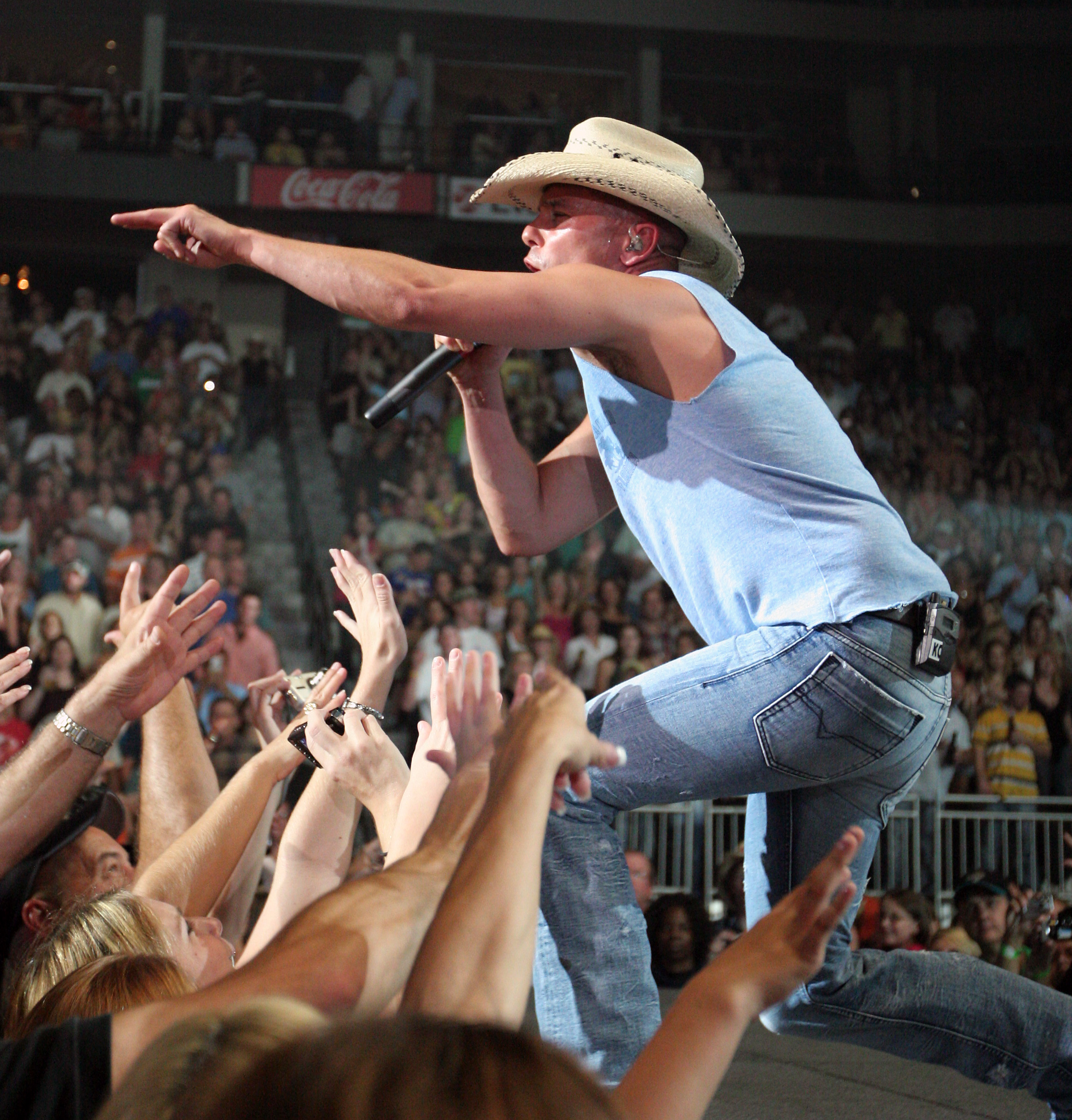
Kenny Chesney during a performance in Jacksonville, Florida on August 30, 2008

In August 2008, Chesney released a song titled "Everybody Wants to Go to Heaven", which reached number one Billboard Hot Country Songs chart. The album Lucky Old Sun was released on October 14, 2008. It was followed by a cover of Mac McAnally's 1990 single "Down the Road". The album once again topped both the Billboard 200 and the Top Country Albums Chart, and has since been certified platinum by the RIAA. Chesney's cover of "Down the Road" garnered him his 3rd Grammy nomination for Best Country Collaboration with Vocals on December 2, 2009.

Chesney's 2009 tour was titled the Sun City Carnival Tour and featured both small and large venues in order to keep his ticket prices down.

=== 2010s ===
In May 2009, Chesney released his second compilation album, Greatest Hits II, which included the No. 1 hit, "Out Last Night", as the lead single. On February 9, 2010, the album was re-released with two new tracks "This Is Our Moment" and "Ain't Back Yet", with the latter becoming the album's third single in February 2010. Also included on this album is one that Willie Nelson recorded before Chesney did, "I'm Alive". Chesney later recorded a version of the song as a duet with Dave Matthews. This version was released in August 2009 as the album's second single. He also embarked on the Sun City Carnival Tour.

In July 2010, Chesney released "The Boys of Fall" as the lead-off single from his album Hemingway's Whiskey, which was released in September 2010. The song reached No. 1 on the Hot Country Songs chart for the week of October 9, 2010. That year, Chesney produced a documentary for ESPN titled The Boys of Fall based on his song of the same name. Hemingway's Whiskey topped both the Billboard 200 and the Top Country Albums Chart, and has since been certified double platinum by the RIAA.

In November 2010, Chesney performed at the 44th Annual Country Music Awards.

The second single from Hemingway's Whiskey, "Somewhere with You", was released in November 2010. The song debuted at No. 35 on the country chart for the week of November 6, 2010. Both it and its followup, "Live a Little", reached number 1 on the country charts. The next single was "You and Tequila", co-written and originally recorded by Deana Carter. Chesney's rendition, which featured Grace Potter on backing vocals, reached number 3. "Reality" reached number 1.

Chesney produced and narrated a biographical film, The Color Orange, on his favorite football player growing up, Tennessee Volunteers football quarterback and Canadian Football League hall-of-fame Condredge Holloway. The film was produced for ESPN's "Year of the Quarterback" series, and premiered on February 20, 2011.

Chesney released his fourteenth studio album, Welcome to the Fishbowl, on June 19, 2012. Its lead-off single, a Tim McGraw duet titled "Feel Like a Rock Star", debuted at number 13 on the country charts, making it the second-highest debuting country song since the Billboard charts were first tabulated via Nielsen SoundScan, and the highest-debuting duet on that chart. The song peaked at number 11. The album failed to top the Billboard 200 peaking at number 2 however it did top the Country Album Charts. It has since been certified platinum by the RIAA.

BNA Records closed in June 2012. As a result, Chesney was transferred to Columbia Nashville, now Sony Music Nashville. His first release under Columbia was the album's second single, "Come Over", which went to number 1. The album's third and final single was "El Cerrito Place", which was written by Keith Gattis and originally recorded by Charlie Robison. Chesney's rendition, which featured Grace Potter on backing vocals, reached number 10 on the country charts. Chesney's collaboration with Grace Potter "You and Tequila" was nominated for Best Country Duo/Group Performance at the 54th Annual Grammy Awards.

Chesney released his fifteenth studio album, Life on a Rock, on April 30, 2013. The first single from the album, "Pirate Flag", was released to iTunes on February 5, 2013, and peaked at number 3 on the Country Airplay chart in May 2013. Pirate Flag peaked at number 7 on Billboard's Hot Country Songs chart, May 25, 2013. The album's second single, "When I See This Bar", was released to country radio on June 10, 2013. When I see This Bar peaked at number 25 on Billboard's Hot Country Songs chart, September 14, 2013. This specific album was a drastic change from his regular country feel, to an all beach and island touch. The album became his 7th to top both the Billboard 200 and the Top Country Albums Chart. He also embarked on the No Shoes Nation Tour.

In June 2014, Chesney released the song "American Kids", written by Rodney Clawson, Luke Laird, and Shane McAnally. This song served as the lead-off single from his sixteenth studio album, The Big Revival, which was released on September 23, 2014. The album's second single, "Til It's Gone", was released in mid-October. It reached number one on the Country Airplay chart the week of January 31, 2015. The third single "Wild Child", which is a duet with Grace Potter, was released two days later. It reached number one on the Country Airplay chart the week of June 27, 2015. The album's fourth single, "Save It for a Rainy Day", was released to country radio on June 29, 2015. It reached number one on the Country Airplay chart.

On October 24, Chesney announced his 2015 tour The Big Revival Tour, which began on March 26, 2015 and included ten shows with Jason Aldean. In 2016 he was awarded the CMA Pinnacle Award which is given out by the Country Music Association Awards to an artist that undeniably redefined the pinnacle of success in the genre.

The album Cosmic Hallelujah, was released on October 28, 2016. It included the single "Noise", released in March 2016, and "Setting the World on Fire", featuring singer P!NK, released in July 2016. The song won Top Country Collaboration at the 2017 Billboard Music Awards. The album debuted at number 2 on the Billboard 200 selling 89,000 copies in its first week. Along with his 10th straight album to top the Country Albums chart. That same year he went on the Spread the Love Tour. In 2018 Cosmic Hallelujah was nominated for Best Country Album at the 60th Annual Grammy Awards. it has since reached gold certification.

On August 25, 2012, at Gillette Stadium in Foxborough, Massachusetts, Kenny Chesney announced "No Shoes Nation" as the name of his fan club. The term No Shoes Nation originated from Chesney's hit song "No Shoes, No Shirt, No Problem". The symbol of No Shoes Nation is a black flag with a white skull and crossbones. The name was accompanied by a live album called Live in No Shoes Nation, which topped the Billboard 200 after its release in late 2017. No Shoes Nation inspired the name of Chesney's SiriusXM channel, No Shoes Radio.

In January 2018, Chesney ended his contract with Sony Music Nashville and signed to Warner Records Nashville. Chesney released his first album with Warner, entitled Songs for the Saints, in July 2018. Songs for the Saints debuted at number two on the US Billboard 200 with 77,000 album-equivalent units, including 65,000 pure album sales. It was Chesney's 15th consecutive top 10 album in the US.

From April 18, to August 24 Chesney went on the Trip Around the Sun Tour. In 2019 Chesney went on the Songs for the Saints Tour.

=== 2020s ===
In May 2020, Chesney released Here and Now, which features the title track and "Tip of My Tongue", a leadoff single that was released in mid-2019. The album debuted at number one on both the Billboard 200 and U.S. Country Charts and became Chesney's 16th top 10 album on the U.S. Billboard 200, with 233,000 units. It has since been certified gold.

In 2021 Chesney collaborated with Kelsea Ballerini to release the song "Half of My Hometown" which topped the Country Airplay charts. The song also won Musical Event of the Year at the 55th Annual Country Music Association Awards.

In 2022 Chesney embarked on the Here and Now Tour which was originally scheduled for 2020 however it was postponed due to the COVID-19 pandemic. He then headlined the I Go Back Tour in 2023.

On March 22, 2024 Chesney released his twentieth studio album Born which debuted at number 20 on the US Billboard 200, with 26,000 records sold in the first week. The single "Take Her Home" became Chesney's 33rd number hit on the Country charts the most of any other artist since its inception. He then went on a co headling tour with Zac Brown Band in 2024.

On October 19, 2025 Chesney was inducted into Country Music Hall of Fame.

On November 4, 2025, Chesney's memoir Heart Life Music, cowritten with music journalist Holly Gleason, was published. The book quickly topped the New York Times' Hardcover Nonfiction and Combined Print & E-Book Nonfiction Best Sellers Lists.

On March 17, 2026, Chesney was signed as the flagship artist to Hey Now Records, a boutique, Nashville-based independent record founded by Clint Higham, John Esposito, and Kris Lamb. The label and Chesney's debut single for the record, "Carry On", was released on May 8, 2026, and was just the third song ever to have all eligible country stations add the song in its debut week. The song is also the lead single to Chesney's upcoming twenty-first studio album, Silver Sands Marina, and his first solo release since July 2024 with "Just to Say We Did".

== Personal life ==
In 2000, Kenny Chesney and Tim McGraw became involved in a scuffle with police officers in Buffalo, New York, after Chesney was riding a State Police horse and refused to get off the horse. McGraw came to Chesney's aid after police officers nearby believed the horse was being stolen. The two were arrested and charged, Chesney for disorderly conduct and McGraw for assault, but were acquitted in 2001.

On May 9, 2005, Chesney married actress Renée Zellweger in a ceremony on the island of St. John. They had met in January at a relief event for the 2004 Indian Ocean earthquake and tsunami. On September 15, 2005, after only four months of marriage, they announced their plans for an annulment. Zellweger cited fraud as the reason in the related papers, and after media scrutiny of her use of the word "fraud", she qualified the use of the term, stating that it was "simply legal language and not a reflection of Kenny's character". Chesney later suggested the failure of his marriage was due to "the fact that I panicked". In an interview by 60 Minutes with Anderson Cooper, Chesney commented on the failed marriage, "The only fraud that was committed was me thinking that I knew what it was like... that I really understood what it was like to be married, and I really didn't." The annulment was finalized in late December 2005.

Chesney is a supporter of the Tennessee Volunteers Football team. He has also stated he has a love for New England and the Boston Red Sox.

In 2017, Chesney's house on Saint John, U.S. Virgin Islands was destroyed by Hurricane Irma. He fell in love with the island after shooting the music video for "How Forever Feels".

In 2018, Forbes estimated Chesney's annual income at $37 million.

=== Philanthropy ===
In September 2017, in the aftermath of Hurricane Irma, Chesney donated use of his private jet to reunite two teenage boys, who were stranded, with their mother. Chesney set up a charitable fund, Love for Love City, to help victims of the storm. Chesney donated all proceeds from his album Songs for the Saints to the fund.

In September 2024, while in Foxborough, Massachusetts for a live show, Chesney made multiple surprise donations of more than $1 Million to multiple Massachusetts charities to benefit youth music programs and animal shelters and the Foxborough police and fire departments.

== Tours ==
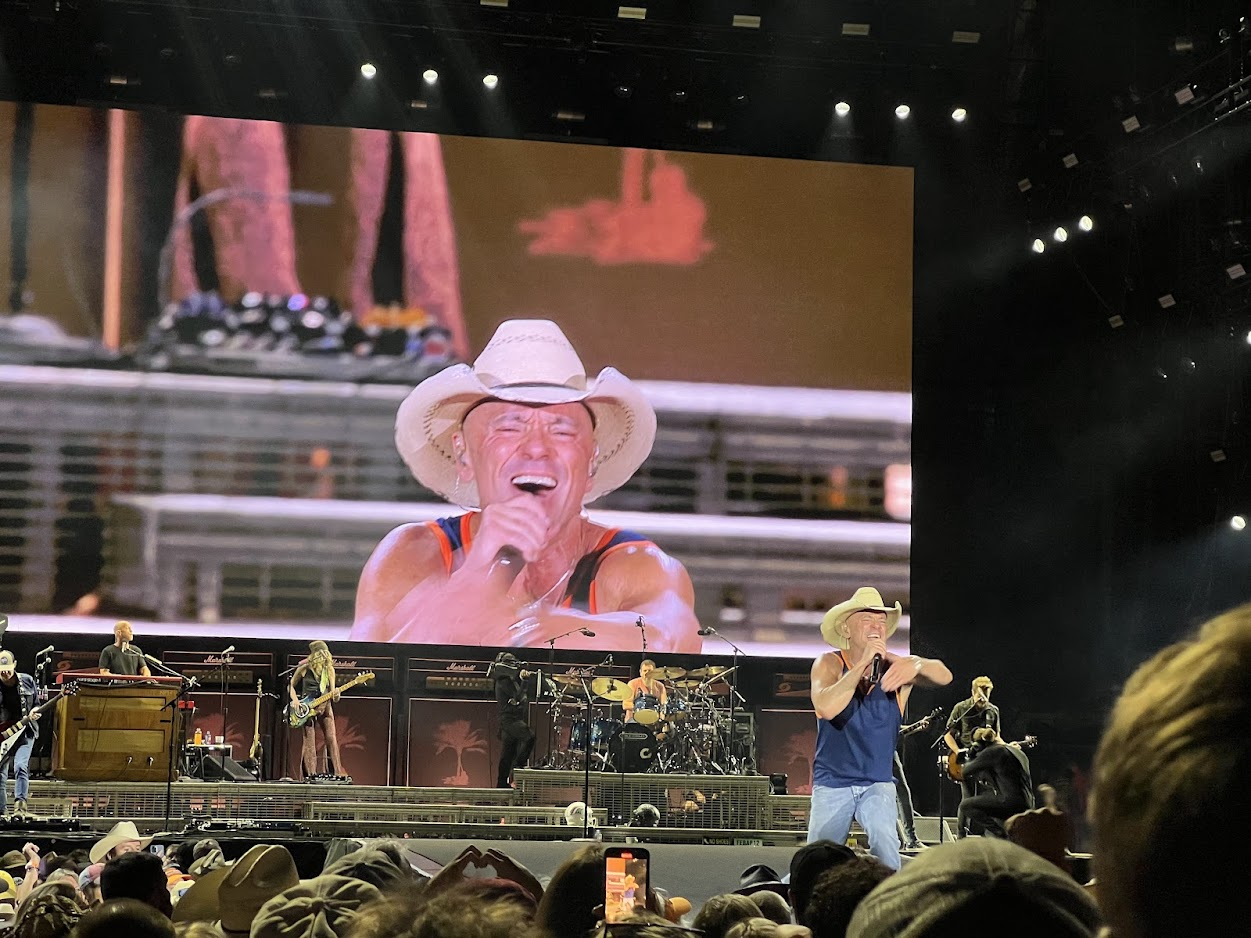
Kenny Chesney at Empower Field at Mile High in Denver during the Sun Goes Down Tour in 2024

Chesney won the Billboard Touring Award for Top Package Tour five consecutive years between 2005 and 2009, and again in 2011, 2012, and 2015.

Headlining

- I Will Stand Tour (1998)
- Everywhere We Go Tour (1999)
- Kenny Chesney on Tour (2000–2001)
- No Shoes, No Shirt, No Problems Tour (2002)
- Margaritas 'n Senoritas Tour (2003)
- Guitars, Tiki Bars and a Whole Lotta Love Tour (2004)
- Somewhere in the Sun Tour (2005)
- The Road and The Radio Tour (2006)
- Flip-Flop Summer Tour (2007)
- Poets and Pirates Tour (2008)
- Sun City Carnival Tour (2009)
- No Shoes Nation Tour (2013)
- 2015: The Big Revival Tour
- Spread the Love Tour (2016)
- Trip Around the Sun Tour (2018)
- Songs for the Saints Tour (2019)
- Here and Now Tour (2022)
- I Go Back Tour (2023)

Co-headlining

- Goin' Coastal Tour (with the Zac Brown Band) (2011)
- Brothers of the Sun Tour (with Tim McGraw) (2012)
- Sun Goes Down Tour (with Zac Brown Band) (2024)

Residencies

- Kenny Chesney: Live at Sphere (2025)

Opening act

- George Strait Country Music Festival (for George Strait) (1998, 1999, 2000)

== Discography ==
Studio albums

- In My Wildest Dreams (1994)
- All I Need to Know (1995)
- Me and You (1996)
- I Will Stand (1997)
- Everywhere We Go (1999)
- No Shoes, No Shirt, No Problems (2002)
- All I Want for Christmas Is a Real Good Tan (2003)
- When the Sun Goes Down (2004)
- Be as You Are (Songs from an Old Blue Chair) (2005)
- The Road and the Radio (2005)
- Just Who I Am: Poets & Pirates (2007)
- Lucky Old Sun (2008)
- Hemingway's Whiskey (2010)
- Welcome to the Fishbowl (2012)
- Life on a Rock (2013)
- The Big Revival (2014)
- Cosmic Hallelujah (2016)
- Songs for the Saints (2018)
- Here and Now (2020)
- Born (2024)
- Silver Sands Marina (2026)

== See also ==
- List of best-selling music artists
- List of highest-grossing live music artists
