= Down the Rabbit Hole Live =

2018–19 concert tour by the Zac Brown Band

- Tour by Zac Brown Band
- Tour poster
- Associated album: Welcome Home
- Start date: June 8, 2018
- End date: April 27, 2019
- Legs: 2
- No. of shows: 41

Zac Brown Band concert chronology
- Welcome Home Tour (2017); Down the Rabbit Hole Live (2018–19); The Owl Tour (2019)

Down the Rabbit Hole Live was the fifth headlining concert tour by American country music group the Zac Brown Band, in support of their fifth studio album Welcome Home (2017). The tour began on June 8, 2018, in Lincoln, Nebraska and concluded on April 27, 2019, in Peoria, Illinois

== Background ==
The band announced the tour in January 2018. Fourteen of the shows took place at Major League Baseball stadiums. OneRepublic, Leon Bridges, Nahko and Medicine for the People, Mark O’Connor Band, Darrell Scott, and Caroline Jones supported the first leg of the tour. The second leg was announced in November 2018.

== Commercial reception ==
Their first night at Fenway Park marked their eighth consecutive sold-out performance at the park which broke a venue record. They also hold a record at Fenway for the most tickets sold out of any act to perform there.

Their show on June 23, 2018, at Lakeview Amphitheater in Syracuse, New York, has been reportedly sold out. This is the second year in a row they have sold out that venue.

== Critical reception ==
Kevin Coffey of the Omaha World-Herald who attended opening night in Lincoln, thought that the choice of covers were interesting. During their cover of Hozier's "Take Me to Church", he said that, "it didn't fit with the show and Brown's velvety voice also didn't fit the song." He also wasn't too fond of their cover of Billy Joel's "The Longest Time".

== Setlist ==
The following setlist comes from opening night in Lincoln, Nebraska on June 8, 2018.

1. "Day for the Dead"
2. "Keep Me in Mind"
3. "As She's Walking Away"
4. "Whiskey's Gone"
5. "Next to Me" (Imagine Dragons cover)
6. "Day That I Die"
7. "Sweet Annie"
8. "Tomorrow Never Comes"
9. "No Roots"
10. "No Roots" (Alice Merton cover)
11. "Free"/"Into the Mystic" (Van Morrison cover)
12. "Take Me to Church" (Hozier cover)
13. "Knee Deep"

Intermission

14. "The Longest Time"
15. "Colder Weather"
16. "Loving You Easy"
17. "Goodbye in Her Eyes"
18. "Beautiful Drug"
19. "In My Blood" (Mark O'Connor cover)
20. "Eleanor Rigby" (The Beatles cover)
21. Medley: "Leader of the Band"/"My Old Man"/"The Living Years"
22. "From Now On" (Hugh Jackman cover)
23. "With a Little Help from My Friends" (The Beatles cover)
24. "Chicken Fried"
25. "Homegrown"

Encore

26. "Cult of Personality" (Living Colour cover)
27. "Paint It Black" (The Rolling Stones cover)
28. "Bennie and the Jets" (Elton John cover)
29. "Long Train Runnin'" (The Doobie Brothers cover)
30. "Tush" (ZZ Top cover)
31. "Thank You (Led Zeppelin cover)
32. "Despacito" (Luis Fonsi and Daddy Yankee cover)
33. "Man in the Box" (Alice in Chains cover)
34. "Thunderstruck" (AC/DC cover)
35. "Sabotage" (Beastie Boys cover)

== Tour dates ==
Date	City	Country	Venue	Opening acts
Leg 1
June 8, 2018	Lincoln	United States	Pinnacle Bank Arena	Mark O’Connor Band; Darrell Scott
June 9, 2018	Sioux Falls	United States	Denny Sanford PREMIER Center	Mark O’Connor Band; Darrell Scott
June 15, 2018	Boston	United States	Fenway Park	Mark O’Connor Band; Darrell Scott
June 16, 2018	Boston	United States	Fenway Park	Mark O’Connor Band; Darrell Scott
June 22, 2018	Hershey	United States	Hersheypark Stadium	Mark O’Connor Band; Darrell Scott
June 23, 2018	Syracuse	United States	Lakeview Amphitheater	Mark O’Connor Band; Darrell Scott
June 24, 2018	Darien Center	United States	Darien Lake Performing Arts Center	Mark O’Connor Band; Darrell Scott
June 30, 2018	Atlanta	United States	SunTrust Park	OneRepublic; Nahko and Medicine for the People
July 13, 2018	Toronto	Canada	Rogers Centre	Nahko and Medicine for the People
July 14, 2018	Detroit	United States	Comerica Park	OneRepublic; Nahko and Medicine for the People
July 19, 2018	Camden	United States	BB&T Pavilion	Mark O’Connor Band; Darrell Scott
July 20, 2018	Camden	United States	BB&T Pavilion	Mark O’Connor Band; Darrell Scott
July 27, 2018	Washington, D.C.	United States	Nationals Park	OneRepublic; Caroline Jones
July 28, 2018	Flushing	United States	Citi Field	OneRepublic; Caroline Jones
July 29, 2018	Flushing	United States	Citi Field	OneRepublic; Caroline Jones
August 2, 2018	Cuyahoga Falls	United States	Blossom Music Center	Mark O’Connor Band; Darrell Scott
August 3, 2018	Noblesville	United States	Ruoff Home Mortgage Music Center	Mark O’Connor Band; Darrell Scott
August 4, 2018	Cincinnati	United States	Great American Ball Park	Leon Bridges
August 10, 2018	Minneapolis	United States	Target Field	OneRepublic
August 11, 2018	East Troy	United States	Alpine Valley Music Theatre	Mark O’Connor Band; Darrell Scott
August 12, 2018	East Troy	United States	Alpine Valley Music Theatre	Mark O’Connor Band; Darrell Scott
August 31, 2018	Seattle	United States	Safeco Field	OneRepublic
September 15, 2018	Virginia Beach	United States	Veterans United Home Loans Amphitheater	Mark O’Connor Band; Darrell Scott
September 20, 2018	San Francisco	United States	AT&T Park	Mark O’Connor Band; Darrell Scott
September 21, 2018	Las Vegas	United States	Palms Casino Resort	Mark O’Connor Band; Darrell Scott
September 28, 2018	Bangor	United States	Darling's Waterfront Pavilion	Mark O’Connor Band; Darrell Scott
September 29, 2018	Saratoga Springs	United States	Saratoga Performing Arts Center	Caroline Jones; Darrell Scott
Leg 2
March 1, 2019	Tulsa	United States	BOK Center	Moon Taxi
March 9, 2019	New Orleans	United States	Smoothie King Center	Moon Taxi
March 10, 2019	Orange Beach	United States	Amphitheater at the Wharf	Moon Taxi
March 15, 2019	Phoenix	United States	Ak-Chin Pavilion	Moon Taxi
March 16, 2019	Laughlin	United States	Laughlin Events Center	Moon Taxi
March 28, 2019	Nashville	United States	Bridgestone Arena	Moon Taxi
March 29, 2019	Brandon	United States	Brandon Amphitheater	Moon Taxi
March 30, 2019	Memphis	United States	FedExForum	Moon Taxi
April 11, 2019	Evans	United States	Evans Town Centre Park	Moon Taxi
April 12, 2019	Virginia Beach	United States	Veterans United Home Loans Amphitheater	Moon Taxi
April 13, 2019	Raleigh	United States	Coastal Credit Union Music Park	Moon Taxi
April 14, 2019	Charlotte	United States	PNC Music Pavilion	Moon Taxi
April 25, 2019	Tuscaloosa	United States	Tuscaloosa Amphitheater	Moon Taxi
April 26, 2019	Maryland Heights	United States	Hollywood Casino Amphitheatre	Moon Taxi
April 27, 2019	Peoria	United States	Peoria Civic Center	Moon Taxi

Notes

- The Charlotte and Raleigh shows on September 13 and 14, 2018, were canceled due to Hurricane Florence. They were rescheduled for April 13 and 14, 2019.

== Band ==
- Zac Brown – lead vocals, guitars, banjo, bass guitar
- Jimmy De Martini – harmony and backing vocals, fiddle, guitar, mandolin
- John Driskell Hopkins – harmony and backing vocals, guitar, banjo, baritone guitar, ukulele, double bass
- Coy Bowles – guitars, Hammond organ, piano, slide guitar
- Clay Cook – guitars, Hammond organ, piano, slide guitar
- Chris Fryer – drums, percussion
- Daniel De Los Reyes – percussion
- Matt Mangano – bass guitar
