= Love & Fear =

Studio album by Zac Brown Band
- Released: December 5, 2025
- Recorded: 2025
- Studio: Southern Ground (Nashville); Henson (Hollywood); Easy Eye (Nashville); Ocean Way (Nashville); Blue Rock (Wimberley)
- Genre: Country
- Length: 49:43
- Label: Master of None
- Producer: Zac Brown

Zac Brown Band chronology
The Comeback (2021)	Love & Fear (2025)

Singles from Love & Fear
- 1. "I Ain't Worried About It" Released: June 6, 2025; 2. "Let It Run" Released: July 18, 2025; 3. "Butterfly" Released: September 5, 2025

Love & Fear is the eighth studio album by American country music group Zac Brown Band. The album was released on December 5, 2025, by Master of None. This is their first album in four years and features collaborations with Snoop Dogg, Dolly Parton, and Marcus King. It also was the lowest-performing album of their career, failing to chart on the Billboard 200.

== Promotion ==
The band promoted the album on their Las Vegas residency at The Sphere. A tour will follow from July to November 2026.

== Track listing ==
All tracks are written by Zac Brown, with additional co-writers noted.

Love & Fear track listing
No.	Title	Writer(s)	Length
1.	"I Ain't Worried About It"	Chris Gelbuda; Channing Wilson; John Driskell Hopkins; Chayce Michael Beckham	3:24
2.	"Hard Run" (featuring Marcus King)	Gelbuda	4:03
3.	"The Sum"	Lukas Nelson	3:56
4.	"Let It Run" (featuring Snoop Dogg)	Gelbuda; John Widōmākr; Andy Frasco; Calvin Broadus	2:58
5.	"Animal"	Jimmy De Martini; Dan Auerbach; Ben Simonetti; Coy Bowles	4:10
6.	"Butterfly" (featuring Dolly Parton)	Sasha Sirota; Auerbach	4:04
7.	"Give It Away"	Bear Rinehart	3:30
8.	"Can You Hear Me Now"	Gelbuda	3:14
9.	"Thank You for Loving Her"	Gelbuda	4:09
10.	"Come to Me"	Gelbuda	4:23
11.	"Nothing's a Coincidence"	Tenille Townes; Dave Grohl; Charlie Starr	4:03
12.	"Passenger"	Gelbuda; Wilson; Ellis Melillo	3:51
13.	"What You Gonna Do"	Simonetti; Jonathan Singleton; Wyatt Durrette	3:57
Total length:			49:43

== Personnel ==
Credits adapted from the album's liner notes.

=== Zac Brown Band ===
- Zac Brown – vocals, production (all tracks); acoustic guitar (tracks 1–3, 6–13), electric guitar (5), piano (6)
- Coy Bowles – electric guitar (1–3, 5–12), Dobro (4)
- Clay Cook – vocals (1–12), additional engineering (1, 2, 4, 5), programming (1, 4), Hammond organ (1, 5, 6, 8, 10), Wurlitzer electric piano (2, 6, 8, 10), Hohner Clavinet (2), electric guitar (3, 4), Mellotron (3), keyboards (4, 5), Hammond B-3 organ (4, 9), 12-string acoustic guitar (5), piano (6, 7, 12); marimba, bells (6); synthesizer (9), Fender Bass VI (11)
- Daniel de los Reyes – percussion (1–12)
- Jimmy De Martini – vocals (1–12), violin (1–3, 5–12), string section (3, 10)
- John Driskell Hopkins – vocals (1–12), acoustic guitar (1, 8), electric guitar (2, 3, 5, 7, 9–12)
- Chris Fryar – drums (1–5, 7–12)
- Caroline Jones – vocals (1–12), acoustic guitar (1–3, 5–12), bouzouki (2, 3, 7), banjo (4, 8), synthesizer (7)
- Matt Mangano – associate production, digital editing (all tracks); bass (1–12), additional engineering (1, 2, 4), vocal production (3, 5), orchestra production (6)

=== Additional musicians ===
- Sasha Sirota – programming (1)
- Marcus King – electric guitar (2, 8)
- Steve Epting – vocal arrangement (3, 5, 10)
- Nikki Grier – vocals arrangement (3, 5, 10)
- Lakeisha Lewis – choir vocals (3, 5, 10)
- Aja Grant – choir vocals (3, 5, 10)
- Alexandra Griffin – choir vocals (3, 5, 10)
- Amanda Stollings – choir vocals (3, 5, 10)
- Anthony "Jawan" McEastland – choir vocals (3, 5, 10)
- Ashly Williams – choir vocals (3, 5, 10)
- Brandon Winbush – choir vocals (3, 5, 10)
- Brooke Brewer – choir vocals (3, 5, 10)
- Cameron Wright – choir vocals (3, 5, 10)
- Carmel Echols – choir vocals (3, 5, 10)
- Chelsea Miller – choir vocals (3, 5, 10)
- Erik Brooks – choir vocals (3, 5, 10)
- Jasmine Patton – choir vocals (3, 5, 10)
- Jeronelle McGhee – choir vocals (3, 5, 10)
- Landon Thomas – choir vocals (3, 5, 10)
- Lavance Colley – choir vocals (3, 5, 10)
- Mare Floyd – choir vocals (3, 5, 10)
- Naarai Jacobs – choir vocals (3, 5, 10)
- Phylicia Hill – choir vocals (3, 5, 10)
- Keisha Renee – choir vocals (3, 5, 10)
- Snoop Dogg – vocals (4)
- Chris Gelbuda – mandolin, acoustic guitar (4)
- Christian "Leggy" Langdon – programming (4)
- Sam Bacco – drums, percussion, vibraphone (6)
- Dolly Parton – vocals (6)
- Kristin Wilkinson – symphonic orchestration, conductor (6)
- Roy Agee – trombone (6)
- David Angell – violin, orchestra management (6)
- Monisa Angell – viola (6)
- Carrie Bailey – violin (6)
- Kevin Bate – cello (6)
- Jenny Bifano – violin (6)
- Emily Bowland – clarinet (6)
- WeiTsun Chang – violin (6)
- Seanad Chang – viola (6)
- Janet Darnall – violin (6)
- David Davidson – violin (6)
- Harry Ditzel – French horn (6)
- Andrew Dunn – cello (6)
- Rachel Englander – violin (6)
- Chris Farrell – viola (6)
- Erik Gration – flute (6)
- Barry Green – trombone (6)
- Erin Hall – violin (6)
- Alison Hoffman – violin (6)
- Austin Hoke – cello (6)
- Matt Jefferson – bass trombone (6)
- Josee Kleine – violin (6)
- Neil Konouchi – tuba (6)
- Annaliese Kowert – violin (6)
- Jennifer Kummer – French horn (6)
- Betsy Lamb – viola (6)
- Rachel Miller – harp (6)
- Craig Nelson – bass (6)
- Leslie Norton – French horn (6)
- Steve Patrick – trumpet (6)
- Gil Perel – bassoon (6)
- Dan Reinker – viola (6)
- Sari Reist – cello (6)
- Joel Reist – bass (6)
- Jung Min Shin – violin (6)
- Luke Simonson – oboe (6)
- Annaliese Spina – French horn (6)
- Mary Kathryn Vanosdale – violin (6)
- Karen Winklemann – violin (6)
- Maureen Murphy – vocals (7)
- Dan Davis – programming (7, 8)

=== Technical ===
- Chris Gelbuda – additional production (4)
- Dan Davis – engineering (1–5, 7–13)
- M. Allen Parker – engineering (6)
- Hank Bachara – engineering assistance (1–5, 7–13)
- Anderson Clendenin – engineering assistance (1–5, 7–13)
- Ciaran de Chaud – engineering assistance (3, 5, 10)
- Ryan Gratzer – engineering assistance (3, 5, 10)
- Sarah Randolph – engineering assistance (6, 13)
- Austin Brown – engineering assistance (6)
- Tate Sablatura – engineering assistance (6)
- Thomas Lpez – engineering assistance (6)
- McKinley James – engineering assistance (6)
- Jonny Ullman – engineering assistance (6)
- Caleb Vanbuskirk – engineering assistance (6)
- Tyler Zwiep – engineering assistance (6)
- Chris McLaughlin – vocal engineering (3, 5, 10)
- Nick Spezia – orchestra engineering (6)
- Christian "Leggy" Langdon – mixing (all tracks), additional engineering (13)
- Colin Leonard – mastering
- Nikki Grier – vocal production (5, 10)
- Steve Epting – vocal production (10)

=== Visuals ===
- Tyler Lord – creative direction
- Playlab – album design
- Louis Markoya – album cover art
- Cydney Wilkes – interior and back cover art

== Charts ==
Chart performance for Love & Fear
Chart (2025)	Peak position
US Top Current Album Sales (Billboard)	28
