= Black Out the Sun Tour =

2016–17 concert tour by the Zac Brown Band

- Tour by Zac Brown Band
- Promotional poster for the tour
- Associated album: Jekyll + Hyde
- Start date: March 19, 2016
- End date: April 21, 2017
- Legs: 2
- No. of shows: 45 in North America; 2 in Australia; 47 Total

Zac Brown Band concert chronology
- Jekyll + Hyde Tour (2015); Black Out the Sun Tour (2016); Welcome Home Tour (2017)

The Black Out the Sun Tour was the sixth headlining concert tour by American country music group the Zac Brown Band, in support of their album Jekyll + Hyde (2015). The tour began on March 19, 2016, in Teton Village, Wyoming and ended on April 21, 2017, in Sydney, Australia.

The band announced the tour in February 2016. On September 21, 2016, two Australian tour dates were announced.

== Concert synopsis ==
The show is filled with their own material and covers. They perform songs from their current album Jekyll + Hyde such as "Castaway", "Beautiful Drug", "Homegrown", and "I'll Be Your Man (Song for a Daughter)", past hits like "Chicken Fried", "Knee Deep", "Colder Weather" and covers such as Van Morrison's "Into the Mystic", The Who's "Baba O'Riley", and Dolly Parton's "Jolene".

=== Production ===
The back of the stage is covered by a video screen that shows images and visuals. There is also another video screen on the stage where the horns, vocalists and percussionists stand.

== Opening acts ==
- Drake White & The Big Fire
- Brothers Osborne, Maren Morris and Marty Stuart (C2C festival only)

== Setlist ==
Not all songs are performed at every show, and in not always in the same order.

1. "Castaway"
2. "Whiskey's Gone"
3. Mashup: "Free"/"Into the Mystic" (Van Morrison cover)
4. "Sweet Annie"
5. "Chicken Fried"
6. "Wind"
7. "As She's Walking Away
8. "S.O.B."
9. "It's Not OK"
10. "I'll Be Your Man (Song for a Daughter)"
11. "Toes"
12. "Keep Me in Mind"
13. Colder Weather"
14. "Beautiful Drug"
15. "Loving You Easy"
16. "Knee Deep"
17. "The Day I Die"
18. "On This Train"
19. "One Day"
20. "Tomorrow Never Comes"
21. "Highway 20 Ride"
22. "Let's Go Easy"
23. "Quiet Your Mind"
24. "Homegrown"

Covers

1. "All Apologies" (Nirvana cover)
2. "Baba O'Riley" (The Who cover)
3. "The Devil Went Down to Georgia" (Charlie Daniels cover)
4. "Enter Sandman (Metallica cover)
5. "Head Like a Hole" (Nine Inch Nails cover)
6. "Hotel California" (Eagles cover)
7. "Jolene" (Dolly Parton cover)
8. "The Way You Look Tonight" (Fred Astaire cover)

== Tour dates ==
List of concerts, showing date, city, country, venue, attendance, and gross revenue
Date	City	Country	Venue	Attendance	Gross revenue
North America
March 19, 2016	Teton Village	United States	Jackson Hole Rendezvous	—N/a	—N/a
April 1, 2016	Omaha	United States	CenturyLink Center Omaha	—N/a	—N/a
April 2, 2016	Wichita	United States	Intrust Bank Arena	—N/a	—N/a
April 3, 2016	Tulsa	United States	BOK Center	—N/a	—N/a
April 16, 2016	Charleston (Note: This show was a part of the Southern Ground Music & Food Festival.)	United States	MUSC Health Stadium	—N/a	—N/a
April 17, 2016	Charleston	United States	MUSC Health Stadium	—N/a	—N/a
April 30, 2016	Austin (Note: This show was a part of the iHeartRadio Country Festival.)	United States	Frank Erwin Center	—N/a	—N/a
May 19, 2016	Hartford	United States	Xfinity Theatre	16,117 / 24,511	$673,725
May 20, 2016	Camden	United States	BB&T Pavilion	25,227 / 25,517	$1,097,136
May 21, 2016	Burgettstown	United States	First Niagara Pavilion	14,776 / 23,001	$454,051
May 22, 2016	Noblesville	United States	Klipsch Music Center	16,043 / 24,740	$565,690
May 27, 2016	Kansas City	United States	Sprint Center	7,775 / 11,153	$578,847
May 28, 2016	Minneapolis	United States	Target Field	28,839 / 39,077	$2,330,737
June 3, 2016	Mountain View	United States	Shoreline Amphitheatre	17,070 / 22,000	$645,757
June 4, 2016	Irvine	United States	Irvine Meadows Amphitheatre	14,589 / 15,000	$871,606
June 5, 2016	Inglewood	United States	The Forum	—N/a	
June 16, 2016	Mack (Note: This show was a part of the Country Jam.)	United States	Country Jam	—N/a	—N/a
June 17, 2016	Mack	United States	Country Jam	—N/a	—N/a
June 18, 2016	Mack	United States	Country Jam	—N/a	—N/a
June 19, 2016	Mack	United States	Country Jam	—N/a	—N/a
June 24, 2016	Cuyahoga Falls	United States	Blossom Music Center	19,187 / 20,672	$831,736
June 25, 2016	East Troy	United States	Alpine Valley Music Theatre	31,417 / 70,888	$1,084,482
June 26, 2016	East Troy	United States	Alpine Valley Music Theatre	31,417 / 70,888	$1,084,482
July 1, 2016	Cincinnati	United States	Riverbend Music Center	19,808 / 20,581	$776,990
July 2, 2016	Clarkston	United States	DTE Energy Music Theatre	14,822 / 15,068	$673,900
July 3, 2016	Darien Center	United States	Darien Lake PAC	16,782 / 21,800	$669,991
July 8, 2016	Kitchener (Note: This show was a part of the CMT Music Fest.)	Canada	Bingemans	—N/a	—N/a
July 9, 2016	Kitchener	Canada	Bingemans	—N/a	—N/a
July 14, 2016	Calgary	Canada	Calgary Stampede	11,120 / 11,408	$1,403,540
July 15, 2016	Craven (Note: This show was a part of the Craven Country Jamboree.)	Canada	Craven Country Jamboree	—N/a	—N/a
July 16, 2016	Pendleton (Note: This show was a part of the Pendelton Whiskey Festival.)	United States	Round Up Grounds	—N/a	—N/a
July 21, 2016	Syracuse	United States	Lakeview Amphitheater	15,413 / 16,806	$646,183
July 22, 2016	Bethel	United States	Bethel Woods Center for the Arts	15,359 / 15,423	$701,756
July 23, 2016	Hershey	United States	Hersheypark Stadium	21,929 / 28,145	$1,015,104
August 19, 2016	Flushing	United States	Citi Field	38,778 / 38,778	$3,265,889
August 20, 2016	Boston	United States	Fenway Park	72,819 / 72,819	$5,477,774
August 21, 2016	Boston	United States	Fenway Park	72,819 / 72,819	$5,477,774
September 1, 2016	Atalantic City	United States	Atlantic City Beach	—N/a	—N/a
September 2, 2016	Bristow	United States	Jiffy Lube Live	21,791 / 23,237	$965,941
September 3, 2016	Saratoga Springs	United States	Saratoga Performing Arts Center	21,104 / 25,151	$811,699
September 4, 2016	Virginia Beach	United States	Veterans United Home Loans Amphitheater	13,414 / 20,055	$633,143
September 15, 2016	Charlotte	United States	PNC Music Pavilion	13,193 / 18,308	$623,352
September 16, 2016	Birmingham	United States	Oak Mountain Amphitheatre	—N/a	—N/a
September 17, 2016	Jacksonville	United States	Jacksonville Veterans Memorial Arena	10,697 / 10,721	$689,155
September 18, 2016	Tampa	United States	MidFlorida Credit Union Amphitheatre	15,949 / 20,245	$722,370
Europe
March 10, 2017	Ireland (Note: This show was a part of the C2C: Country to Country festival.)	Ireland	The O_{2}	—	—
March 11, 2017	Glasgow (Note: This show was a part of the C2C: Country to Country festival.)	Scotland	Clyde Auditorium	—	—
March 12, 2017	London (Note: This show was a part of the C2C: Country to Country festival.)	England	The O_{2} Arena	—	—
Australia
April 19, 2017	Melbourne	Australia	Margaret Court Arena	—	—
April 21, 2017	Sydney	Australia	ICC Sydney Theatre	—	—

Festivals

Cancellations and rescheduled shows

August 12, 2016	Austin	Austin360 Amphitheater	Cancelled
August 13, 2016	Houston	Minute Maid Park	Cancelled
August 14, 2016	Dallas	Gexa Energy Pavilion	Cancelled

== Critical reception ==
Timothy Finn of The Kansas City Star says "the show wasn't flawless" and did not like how long the band introductions went but overall "was one long exhibition of this band's virtuosity and personality".
