= Loving You Easy =

Single by Zac Brown Band

from the album Jekyll + Hyde
- Released: May 4, 2015
- Genre: Country, pop soul
- Length: 2:35
- Label: Southern Ground; BMLG; Republic; John Varvatos Records
- Songwriters: Zac Brown, Niko Moon, Al Anderson
- Producer: In the Arena Productions

Zac Brown Band singles chronology
"Heavy Is the Head" (2015)	"Loving You Easy" (2015)	"Junkyard" (2015)

Music video
- "Loving You Easy" on YouTube

"Loving You Easy" is a song recorded by American country music group Zac Brown Band. It was released as the third single from the band's fourth studio album, Jekyll + Hyde, on May 4, 2015. The song was written by Zac Brown, Al Anderson and Niko Moon.

== Content ==
The song features "perky instrumentation… sprinkled with soul, funk, and fiddle" and a "fattening bass riff". Lyrically, it is "about being in love with a good woman".

== Critical reception ==
Thom Jurek of Allmusic, in his review of the album, wrote that "The Caribbean-tinged tunes such as 'Loving You Easy,' with its Buffett-esque groove wed to retro pop/soul and 'One Day,' with its sweeping yet earthy fiddle, horns, and stirring backing choruses, are both winners, too." Giving it a "B", Jim Casey of Country Weekly called the song "a Cool Whip song—sweet and fluffy, without too many calories" but praised the instrumentation and "sugary harmony".

== Personnel ==
Compiled from liner notes.

- Zac Brown - lead vocals, electric guitar
- Coy Bowles - Hammond organ, Wurlitzer electric piano
- Clay Cook - background vocals, electric guitar, Mellotron
- Daniel de los Reyes - percussion
- Chris Fryar - drums
- John Driskell Hopkins - background vocals, acoustic guitar
- Matt Mangano - bass guitar
- Jimmy De Martini - background vocals, violin, strings
- Ben Simonetti - programming

== Music video ==
The music video was directed by Danny Clinch and premiered in May 2015. The video stars actress Halston Sage. None of the members of Zac Brown Band appear in the video, however, save for a brief view of the front cover of an LP copy of its Jekyll + Hyde album.

== Chart performance ==
The song debuted at number 30 on the Country Airplay chart dated May 9, 2015, and No. 42 on the Country Digital Songs chart with 8,000 copies sold. It also debuted on Country Airplay at No. 30 and Hot Country Songs at No. 34 the same week. It debuted on the Hot 100 at No. 90 for chart dated June 13. As of September 2015, the song has sold 377,000 copies in the United States.

Chart (2015)	Peak position
Canada Hot 100 (Billboard)	55
Canada Country (Billboard)	2
US Billboard Hot 100	40
US Hot Country Songs (Billboard)	4
US Country Airplay (Billboard)	1

=== Year-end charts ===
Chart (2015)	Position
US Country Airplay (Billboard)	43
US Hot Country Songs (Billboard)	16

== Certifications ==
Certifications for Loving You Easy
Region	Certification	Certified units/sales
United States (RIAA)	Platinum	1,000,000^{‡}
^{‡} Sales+streaming figures based on certification alone.
