= Castaway (Zac Brown Band song) =

Single by Zac Brown Band

from the album Jekyll + Hyde
- Released: April 25, 2016
- Genre: Country; reggae
- Length: 3:08
- Label: Southern Ground; BMLG; Republic; John Varvatos Records
- Songwriters: Zac Brown; Niko Moon; Wyatt Durrette; Coy Bowles; John Driskell Hopkins
- Producer: In the Arena Productions

Zac Brown Band singles chronology
"Beautiful Drug" (2015)	"Castaway" (2016)	"My Old Man" (2017)

"Castaway" is a song recorded by American country music group Zac Brown Band. It was released as the sixth single from the band's fourth studio album, Jekyll + Hyde, on April 25, 2016. The song was written by Zac Brown, Coy Bowles, John Driskell Hopkins, Wyatt Durrette and Niko Moon.

== Content ==
The song is an upbeat, reggae-influenced tune about a man who wants to relax on a beach as a "castaway".

== Critical reception ==
An uncredited review from Taste of Country was positive, saying that "The textured vocals are much more compelling than anything from the arrangement, although it’s pretty tough not to enjoy the groove the Zac Brown Band band are laying down in 'Castaway.' It’s actually been some time since ZBB released an island-flavored single, and the timing couldn’t be better for this brand of country music."

== Personnel ==
From Jekyll + Hyde liner notes.

Musical

- Coy Bowles – electric guitar
- Zac Brown – lead vocals, acoustic guitar
- Clay Cook – background vocals, Hammond organ, ukulele
- Jimmy DeMartini – background vocals, violin
- Chris Fryar – drums
- John Driskell Hopkins – background vocals, ukulele
- Matt Mangano – bass guitar, acoustic bass guitar
- Daniel de los Reyes – percussion

Technical

- Brandon Bell - engineering
- John Driskell Hopkins - vocal arrangement
- In the Arena Productions - production
- Andrew Scheps - mixing

== Chart performance ==
The song has sold 200,000 copies in the US as of September 2016.

=== Weekly charts ===
Chart (2016)	Peak position
Canada Country (Billboard)	17
US Billboard Hot 100	96
US Country Airplay (Billboard)	14
US Hot Country Songs (Billboard)	17

=== Year-end charts ===
Chart (2016)	Position
US Hot Country Songs (Billboard)	61
