= The Comeback Tour =

2021 concert tour by the Zac Brown Band

- Tour by Zac Brown Band
- Location: United States
- Start date: August 5, 2021
- End date: November 21, 2021
- Legs: 1
- No. of shows: 20

Zac Brown Band concert chronology
- The Owl Tour (2019); The Comeback Tour (2021); Out in The Middle Tour (2022)

The Comeback Tour was a headlining tour by American country music group the Zac Brown Band. It began on August 5, 2021, in Holmdel, New Jersey and finished on November 21, in Rapid City, South Dakota. The tour comes after canceling their 2020 Roar With the Lions Tour due the COVID-19 pandemic.

== Background ==
The band was set to tour in 2020 but because of the COVID-19 pandemic it was canceled. On May 10, 2021, they announced a new tour, The Comeback Tour. Of the tour Brown said, "We couldn't be more excited to get back on the road and share our new music with our fans. It's been a long difficult year for everyone and we're fired up to be reuniting with our crew, get back on tour, and celebrate a brand new world." Most of the tour will take place on the East Coast with some shows in the Midwest and Colorado.

The September 30–October 3 shows were canceled due to Zac Brown testing positive for COVID-19.

== Critical reception ==
Rick Munroe of Music Fest News said of the West Palm Beach show, "The continuous bursts of sound that filled the venue could be felt from those lucky enough to be in the pit and front rows through the upper reaches of the lawn where many fans watched the show from the massive video screens." He also said "It was a night of feel-good, sing-out-loud and don't-care-who's-listening kind of music."

== Setlist ==
This setlist is a representation of the West Palm Beach, Florida show. It does not represent all concerts for the duration of the tour.

1. "Homegrown"
2. "Toes"
3. "Slow Burn"
4. "Big Love" (Fleetwood Mac cover)
5. "Goodbye in Her Eyes"
6. "Keep Me in Mind"
7. "Same Boat"
8. It's Not OK"
9. "Sweet Annie"
10. "Tomorrow Never Comes"
11. "As She's Walking Away"
12. "The Devil Went Down to Georgia" (Charlie Daniels Band cover)
13. "Old Love Song"
14. "Colder Weather"
15. "Hard to Handle" (Otis Redding cover)
16. "Knee Deep"
17. "Beautiful Drug"

Encore

18. "Black Betty"/"I Want You to Want Me"/"Two Tickets to Paradise"/"In the Air Tonight"/"La Bamba"/"Come Together"/"Jump"/"What's Up" (covers medley)
19. "Rocket Man" (Elton John cover)
20. "Stubborn Pride"
21. "Chicken Fried"

== Opening acts ==
- Ashland Craft
- Gabby Barrett
- Adam Doleac
- Devin Dawson
- Caroline Jones
- Teddy Swims

== Tour dates ==
| Date | City | Country | Venue | Opening acts | Attendance | Revenue |
|---|---|---|---|---|---|---|
| August 5, 2021 | Holmdel | United States | PNC Bank Arts Center | Ashland Craft; Teddy Swims | | |
| August 6, 2021 | Bethel | United States | Bethel Woods Center for the Arts | Ashland Craft; Teddy Swims | | |
| August 8, 2021 | Boston | United States | Fenway Park | Ashland Craft; Teddy Swims | | |
| August 19, 2021 | Columbia | United States | Merriweather Post Pavilion | Ashland Craft; Teddy Swims | | |
| August 20, 2021 | Cuyahoga Falls | United States | Blossom Music Center | Ashland Craft; Teddy Swims | | |
| August 21, 2021 | Hershey | United States | Hersheypark Stadium | Ashland Craft; Teddy Swims | | |
| August 27, 2021 | Noblesville | United States | Ruoff Music Center | Ashland Craft; Teddy Swims | | |
| August 28, 2021 | Tinley Park | United States | Hollywood Casino Amphitheatre | Ashland Craft; Teddy Swims | | |
| August 29, 2021 | Cincinnati | United States | Riverbend Music Center | Ashland Craft; Teddy Swims | | |
| September 2, 2021 | Wantagh | United States | Northwell Health at Jones Beach Theater | Ashland Craft; Adam Doleac | | |
| September 3, 2021 | Wantagh | United States | Northwell Health at Jones Beach Theater | Ashland Craft; Adam Doleac | | |
| September 5, 2021 | Darien | United States | Darien Lake Performing Arts Center | Ashland Craft; Adam Doleac | | |
| September 10, 2021 | Milwaukee | United States | Summerfest | Gabby Barrett | | |
| September 17, 2021 | Greenwood Village | United States | Fiddler's Green Amphitheatre | Ashland Craft; Adam Doleac | | |
| September 18, 2021 | Greenwood Village | United States | Fiddler's Green Amphitheatre | Ashland Craft; Adam Doleac | | |
| October 8, 2021 | Jacksonville | United States | Daily's Place | Caroline Jones | | |
| October 9, 2021 | West Palm Beach | United States | iTHINK Financial Amphitheatre | Caroline Jones | | |
| October 10, 2021 | Tampa | United States | MidFlorida Credit Union Amphitheatre | Caroline Jones | | |
| October 15, 2021 | Raleigh | United States | Coastal Credit Union Music Park | Caroline Jones | | |
| October 16, 2021 | Charlotte | United States | PNC Music Pavilion | Caroline Jones | | |
| October 17, 2021 | Nashville | United States | Bridgestone Arena | Caroline Jones | | |
| November 21, 2021 | Rapid City | United States | Summit Arena | — | | |

=== Canceled shows ===
| Date | City | Venue |
|---|---|---|
| September 30, 2021 | Clarkston | DTE Energy Music Theatre |
| October 1, 2021 | Burgettstown | The Pavilion at Star Lake |
| October 2, 2021 | Syracuse | Lakeview Amphitheater |
| October 3, 2021 | Saratoga Springs | Saratoga Performing Arts Center |
