= Welcome Home (Zac Brown Band album) =

Studio album by Zac Brown Band
- Released: May 12, 2017
- Recorded: January 3–9, 2017
- Studio: RCA Studio A (Nashville, Tennessee); Southern Ground (Nashville, Tennessee)
- Genre: Country
- Length: 38:42
- Label: Elektra, Southern Ground
- Producer: Dave Cobb; In the Arena Productions

Zac Brown Band chronology
Jekyll + Hyde (2015)	Welcome Home (2017)	The Owl (2019)

Singles from Welcome Home
- 1. "My Old Man" Released: February 3, 2017; 2. "Roots" Released: August 7, 2017

Welcome Home is the fifth studio album by American country music band Zac Brown Band. It was released on May 12, 2017, via Elektra Records. The album features the singles "My Old Man" and "Roots" which charted on Hot Country Songs and Country Airplay. Dave Cobb is the album's producer.

== Content ==
Before the album, Zac Brown worked with producer Dave Cobb on a track for the multi-artist album Southern Family in 2016. Cobb also serves as producer on Welcome Home.

Taste of Country describes the album as "a more mature album, aimed at the group's older fans" and notes that "One mostly finds Brown showing appreciation for loved ones". The track "Trying to Drive" is a re-recording of a song that first appeared on the band's 2010 live album Pass the Jar: Zac Brown Band and Friends Live from the Fabulous Fox Theatre in Atlanta, featuring co-writer Aslyn on guest vocals.

== Critical reception ==
Stephen Thomas Erlewine of AllMusic rated the album 3 out of 5 stars, saying that "While the constant parade of country homilies gets a bit weary, the sound of Welcome Home is a warm, comfortable bath. Brown still has a way with a honeyed melody and his band is just as supple, meaning this album is the very definition of music as comfort food." Jonathan Bernstein of Rolling Stone gave it 2.5 out of 5 stars, praising the sound of "Roots" and "Her Majesty" but adding that "it's hard not to hear Welcome Home as an anxious defense of fame and fortune, a reactionary right-turn in response to the mixed reviews the band received for their most recent global pop-grab... A decade after 'Chicken Fried', Zac Brown is laboring strenuously to ensure everyone that he still drinks cold beer on a Friday night, apologizing for a musical adventurousness that he'd be better off simply embracing." Rating it "C+", Chuck Yarborough of The Plain Dealer felt that "My Old Man", "Trying to Drive", and "Family Table" were the album's strongest songs, but criticized "Start Over" as derivative of "Toes". He also felt that the album overall lacked songs as strong as the singles from Jekyll + Hyde. Slant Magazine reviewer Jeremy Winograd also rated it 2.5 out of 5 stars, saying in his review that "Zac Brown's constant reassurances throughout Welcome Home that he's still just a regular dude, set to 40 minutes of aggressively bland Americana, give off the stench of overcompensation" for the "crossover pop" sounds of the previous album. He overall panned many of the songs' lyrics and sounds, saying that "Far worse is the cynical nature of the album's roosty overtures. If Brown's lyrics weren't so painfully on the nose, it might not be so obvious that he's deliberately attempting to parlay Cobb's style and reputation into perceived authenticity", while citing "Trying to Drive" as the strongest track.

== Commercial performance ==
The album debuted at number two on the Billboard 200 and number one on the Top Country Albums chart with 146,000 equivalent album units, of which 139,000 are traditional album sales. In the following week, it sold 23,100 copies. The album has sold 308,600 copies in the US as of September 2018. Welcome Home was the band's first studio album since 2008's The Foundation not to top the Billboard 200.

== Track listing ==
All tracks are written by Zac Brown, Niko Moon, and Ben Simonetti except where noted.

No.	Title	Writer(s)	Length
1.	"Roots"	Coy Bowles, Brown, Moon, Simonetti	3:51
2.	"Real Thing"		3:50
3.	"Long Haul"		3:32
4.	"2 Places at 1 Time"		3:40
5.	"Family Table"		3:31
6.	"My Old Man"		3:47
7.	"Start Over"	Brown, Moon, Simonetti, Pharrell Williams	4:13
8.	"Your Majesty"	Brown, Moon, Simonetti, Kenny Habul	3:42
9.	"Trying to Drive" (featuring Madison Ryann Ward)	Brown, Moon, Simonetti, Aslyn	4:26
10.	"All the Best" (featuring Kacey Musgraves)	John Prine	4:11

== Personnel ==
Adapted from Welcome Home liner notes.

=== Zac Brown Band ===
- Zac Brown - lead vocals, acoustic guitar, electric guitar
- Coy Bowles - electric guitar, slide guitar, resonator guitar
- Clay Cook - acoustic guitar, electric guitar, Hammond organ, harmonium, Mellotron, piano, Wurlitzer electric piano, background vocals
- John Driskell Hopkins - acoustic guitar, banjo, ukulele, background vocals
- Jimmy DeMartini - violin, background vocals
- Daniel de los Reyes - dunun, glockenspiel, percussion
- Chris Fryar - drums, percussion
- Matt Mangano - bass guitar, acoustic guitar

=== Additional Musicians ===
- Aslyn - featured vocals on "Trying to Drive"
- Dave Cobb - acoustic guitar, percussion
- Kacey Musgraves - featured vocals on "All the Best"
- Pharrell Williams - background vocals on "Start Over"

== Charts ==
=== Weekly charts ===
Chart (2017)	Peak position
Australian Albums (ARIA)	8
Belgian Albums (Ultratop Flanders)	182
Canadian Albums (Billboard)	2
New Zealand Heatseekers Albums (RMNZ)	1
Scottish Albums (OCC)	9
Swiss Albums (Schweizer Hitparade)	72
UK Albums (OCC)	25
US Billboard 200	2
US Top Country Albums (Billboard)	1

=== Year-end charts ===
Chart (2017)	Position
US Billboard 200	119
US Top Country Albums (Billboard)	13

== Certifications ==
Region	Certification	Certified units/sales
Canada (Music Canada)	Gold	40,000^{‡}
^{‡} Sales+streaming figures based on certification alone.
