= My Old Man (Zac Brown Band song) =

Single by Zac Brown Band

from the album Welcome Home
- Released: February 3, 2017
- Genre: Country
- Length: 3:47
- Label: Elektra/Southern Ground
- Songwriters: Zac Brown; Niko Moon; Ben Simonetti
- Producer: Dave Cobb

Zac Brown Band singles chronology
| "Castaway" (2016) | "My Old Man" (2017) | "Roots" (2017) |

"My Old Man" is a song by American country music band Zac Brown Band. The song is the lead single to their fifth major-label studio album, Welcome Home. The song was written by Zac Brown, Niko Moon and Ben Simonetti.

== Content and history ==
The song is a ballad about Zac Brown's own father, and the lifestyle examples set by him. It features "the band's harmony-heavy vocals, which drive forward a scaled-back arrangement of unplugged guitar, fiddle and light strings". In the song's first verse, the narrator reflects on his own childhood, while the second focuses on the narrator's adulthood, and the third "reveals that his father is hearing this tribute from heaven, not earth."

The song is the band's first release through the Elektra Records label, in partnership with their own label, Southern Ground. It is also their first release to be produced by record producer Dave Cobb. Along with the release of the single, the band released a lyric video to YouTube which includes pictures of the band members with their fathers.

== Music video ==
The music video was directed by Markus Blunder and premiered on CMT, GAC and VEVO in May 2017.

== Critical reception ==
Billy Dukes of Taste of Country gave a favorable review, saying that "The raw, acoustic ballad has flaws and genuine emotion" and "It’s difficult to hear 'My Old Man' as anything less than a confessional — never have the Zac Brown Band released a single this personal." Kevin John Coyne of Country Universe rated the song "A", praising the lyrics and Brown's vocal performance, adding, "I appreciate Brown’s ability to capture deep and difficult feelings without descending into maudlin sentimentality. I think he gets at an essential truth about losing a parent. In one way, they’re gone, but in another way, they’re more present than they’ve ever been, because they are always in your mind and in your heart." The song earned the band a Grammy nomination for Best Country Duo/Group Performance.

== Chart performance ==
The song debuted at No. 26 on the Country Airplay chart dated for February 18, 2017, and No. 49 on the Hot Country Songs chart for the same date. It is their second-highest debut on the former chart, behind "Homegrown", which entered at the No. 23 position in January 2015. The song has sold 197,000 copies in the United States as of June 2017.

=== Weekly charts ===
| Chart (2017) | Peak position |
|---|---|
| US Billboard Hot 100 | 68 |
| US Country Airplay (Billboard) | 14 |
| US Hot Country Songs (Billboard) | 10 |

=== Year-end charts ===
| Chart (2017) | Position |
|---|---|
| US Country Airplay (Billboard) | 58 |
| US Hot Country Songs (Billboard) | 44 |
