= Beautiful Drug =

2015 single by Zac Brown Band

Single by Zac Brown Band

from the album Jekyll + Hyde
- Released: September 21, 2015
- Genre: Countrytronica; EDM; pop rock
- Length: 3:11
- Label: Southern Ground; BMLG; Republic; John Varvatos Records
- Songwriters: Zac Brown, Niko Moon
- Producer: In the Arena Productions

Zac Brown Band singles chronology
"Junkyard" (2015)	"Beautiful Drug" (2015)	"Castaway" (2016)

"Beautiful Drug" is a song recorded by American country music group Zac Brown Band. It was released as the fourth single from the band's fourth studio album, Jekyll + Hyde, on September 21, 2015. The song was written by Zac Brown and Niko Moon.

On February 14, 2024, it was announced that the late Swedish DJ Avicii's remix of the song would be released on February 16, 2024.

== Critical reception ==
In his review of the album, Carl Wilson of Billboard gave the song a mixed review, saying that "The "beware who enter" sign is hung by the opener, "Beautiful Drug," which doesn't just flirt with top 40 EDM but checks it into a cheap motel for a quickie. The affair is brisk and forgettable, and soon gives way to more comfy MOR and gospel-rock cuts, but notice has been served." A review from Taste of Country was favorable, saying that "it's the most left-of-center single Zac Brown Band have ever released, which translates to their biggest risk. One gets a sense that this band is pretty comfortable at the edges of the format. It's the secret all but the most casual fan was aware of already anyway" and "Not all will [love it], as ZBB employ more effects than ever. But the song's relentless energy will convert most quickly."

== Commercial performance ==
The song first entered the Hot Country Songs chart on the album release at No. 45 for chart dated May 16, 2015, selling 5,400 copies. It debuted on the Country Airplay chart at No. 54 for chart dated September 26, 2015, Billboard Hot 100 at No. 95 for chart dated November 21, 2015, and re-entered the Hot Country Songs chart at No. 48 on October 10, 2015. The band performed the song at the 2015 CMA Awards on November 4, 2015, which prompted 21,000 downloads for the week, and the song then debuted on the Billboard Hot 100 at No. 95. The song has sold 412,000 copies in the US as of May 2016.

== Personnel ==
From Jekyll + Hyde liner notes.

- Coy Bowles – electric guitar
- Zac Brown – lead vocals, acoustic guitar, banjo, programming
- Clay Cook – background vocals, electric guitar
- Jimmy DeMartini – background vocals, violin
- Chris Fryar – drums
- John Driskell Hopkins – background vocals, baritone guitar
- Matt Mangano – bass guitar, acoustic guitar
- Niko Moon – background vocals
- Daniel de los Reyes – percussion
- Ben Simonetti – programming

== Avicii remix ==
"Beautiful Drug"

Remix by Avicii & Zac Brown Band
- Released: February 16, 2024
- Recorded: 2015 (Original version): 2016 (Avicii's arrangement)
- Genre: Countrytronica; pop rock; tropical house; EDM
- Length: 2:44
- Label: No Reserve
- Producer: Avicii

Avicii chronology
"Forever Yours (Tribute)" (2020)	"Beautiful Drug" (2024)	"Forever Yours (Tim's 2016 Ibiza Version)" (2025)

Music video
- "Zac Brown Band - Beautiful Drug (feat. Avicii) - Remix" on YouTube

In February 2024, vocalist Zac Brown announced the release of remix of "Beautiful Drug" by Swedish DJ Avicii.

=== Background ===
Zac Brown and Avicii had previously collaborated on the track "Broken Arrows" for the latter's Stories album. In return for this collaboration, Avicii promised to remix one of Zac Brown's songs, ultimately choosing "Beautiful Drug."

Brown revealed that the song "had been locked away in the vault for a long time." Avicii worked on the remix between 2016 and 2017, but it was never released by the DJ himself. Instead, it was posthumously made available by Zac Brown.

== Charts ==
=== Weekly charts ===
Chart (2015–2016)	Peak position
Canada Hot 100 (Billboard)	68
Canada Country (Billboard)	2
US Billboard Hot 100	52
US Country Airplay (Billboard)	1
US Hot Country Songs (Billboard)	5

=== Year end charts ===
Chart (2016)	Position
US Country Airplay (Billboard)	26
US Hot Country Songs (Billboard)	37

=== Beautiful Drug Remix ===
Chart	Peak position
US Dance/Electronic Songs	48

== Certifications ==
Certifications for Beautiful Drug
Region	Certification	Certified units/sales
United States (RIAA)	Platinum	1,000,000^{‡}
^{‡} Sales+streaming figures based on certification alone.
