= Heavy Is the Head (song) =

Single by Zac Brown Band featuring Chris Cornell

from the album Jekyll + Hyde
- Released: March 6, 2015
- Genre: Southern rock; hard rock; heavy metal
- Length: 3:59
- Label: Southern Ground; BMLG; Republic; John Varvatos
- Songwriter(s): Zac Brown; Niko Moon; Wyatt Durrette; Jimmy De Martini; John Driskell Hopkins; Darrell Scott
- Producer(s): In the Arena Productions; Darrell Scott

Zac Brown Band singles chronology
"Homegrown" (2015)	"Heavy Is the Head" (2015)	"Loving You Easy" (2015)

Chris Cornell singles chronology
"The Keeper" (2011)	"Heavy Is the Head" (2015)	"Nearly Forgot My Broken Heart" (2015)

"Heavy Is the Head" is a song recorded by American country music group Zac Brown Band. It was released on March 6, 2015 as the second single from the band's fourth studio album, Jekyll + Hyde, released on April 28, 2015. It features vocals from Chris Cornell, and was released to rock radio, rather than country.

The song was used as the theme for the 2015 Major League Baseball season and has also appeared in the video game WWE 2K16.

== Personnel ==
Compiled from liner notes.

- Zac Brown – lead vocals, electric guitar
- Chris Cornell – duet vocals
- Coy Bowles – slide guitar
- Clay Cook – Hammond organ
- Donald Dunlavey – electric guitar
- Chris Fryar – drums
- John Driskell Hopkins – electric guitar
- Matt Mangano – bass guitar, electric guitar
- Daniel de los Reyes – percussion
- Jimmy De Martini – violin
- Darrell Scott – background vocals, electric guitar, pedal steel guitar

== Chart performance ==
"Heavy Is the Head" debuted at number 50 on the Billboard Rock Airplay chart and at number 37 on the Mainstream Rock airplay chart for the week ending March 21, 2015. The song is the band's first entry on either chart. Its number one peak on the Mainstream Rock airplay chart has made Zac Brown Band only the second musical act after Bon Jovi to have a number one single on both that chart and the Country Airplay chart.

=== Weekly charts ===
Chart (2015)	Peak position
Canada Rock (Billboard)	1
US Hot Rock & Alternative Songs (Billboard)	14
US Rock & Alternative Airplay (Billboard)	11

=== Year-end charts ===
Chart (2015)	Position
US Hot Rock Songs (Billboard)	51
US Rock Airplay (Billboard)	39
