= Homegrown (song) =

Single by Zac Brown Band

from the album Jekyll + Hyde
- Released: January 12, 2015
- Genre: Southern rock; country rock
- Length: 3:25
- Label: Southern Ground; Big Machine
- Songwriter(s): Zac Brown; Niko Moon; Wyatt Durrette
- Producer(s): Zac Brown; Jay Joyce

Zac Brown Band singles chronology
"All Alright" (2014)	"Homegrown" (2015)	"Heavy Is the Head" (2015)

"Homegrown" is a song recorded by American country music group Zac Brown Band. It was released on January 12, 2015 and is the first single from the band's fourth studio album Jekyll + Hyde, released on April 28, 2015. The song was written by Zac Brown, Wyatt Durrette and Niko Moon.

== Content ==
The song – produced by Zac Brown and Jay Joyce – is about a man satisfied with the life he has rather than what it could be. The man sings about having everything he needs and nothing he doesn't, namely the "good friends that live down the street" and the "good lookin' woman with her arms 'round me" that he would never give up.

== Reception ==
=== Critical ===
The single has received positive reviews from critics. Awarding the single 4 stars, Jason Lipshutz of Billboard describes the single as "an ode to simple living, but it relies on intricately arranged vocal harmonies, splendid guitar/banjo interplay and a lovely key change in the final minute." Kevin John Coyne of Country Universe gave the song a B rating. He described the song as "a perfectly fine record, one that covers very familiar lyrical territory while borrowing more from eighties middle America rock and roll than is usual for the band".

=== Commercial ===
"Homegrown" was the number one most added song at country radio in its debut week with 72 added spins, causing it to debut at number 23 on the Country Airplay chart. It was the most bought country song in the week of its release selling around 75,000 copies, more than double the number 2 selling song. It also debuted at number one on the Country Digital chart with 75,000 copies sold in its first week of release, making it the band's first number one on the chart. "Homegrown" rose to number 2 on the Billboard Hot Country Songs chart, making it the band's highest-charting single on the chart since "No Hurry" peaked at number 2 in 2012. For the week ending April 11, 2015 the song rose from number 3–1 on the Billboard Country Airplay chart, becoming the band's 11th number one on the Billboard Country Charts. As of August 2015, the song has sold 781,000 copies in the United States.

== Personnel ==
Compiled from liner notes.

- Coy Bowles – slide guitar
- Zac Brown – lead vocals, acoustic guitar, electric guitar
- Clay Cook – background vocals, Hammond organ, electric guitar
- Chris Fryar – drums
- John Driskell Hopkins – background vocals, banjo
- Jay Joyce – programming, percussion
- Matt Mangano – bass guitar
- Jimmy De Martini – background vocals, violin, cello
- Daniel de los Reyes – percussion

== Charts ==
Chart (2015)	Peak position
Canada (Canadian Hot 100)	43
Canada Country (Billboard)	1
US Billboard Hot 100	35
US Hot Country Songs (Billboard)	2
US Country Airplay (Billboard)	1

=== Year-end charts ===
Chart (2015)	Position
US Country Airplay (Billboard)	28
US Hot Country Songs (Billboard)	7

== Certifications ==
Region	Certification	Certified units/sales
United States (RIAA)	2× Platinum	2,000,000^{‡}
^{‡} Sales+streaming figures based on certification alone.
