= Sir Rosevelt =

American electronic dance music group (2016–2018)

- Origin: Nashville, Tennessee, U.S.
- Genres: Dance-pop; EDM; folktronica
- Years active: 2016–2018
- Label: Elektra
- Spinoff of: Zac Brown Band
- Past members: Zac Brown; Niko Moon; Ben Simonetti

Sir Rosevelt was an American electronic dance music group consisting of Zac Brown, Niko Moon, and Ben Simonetti. The group, formed in 2016, has released one album for Elektra Records.

== History ==
Zac Brown, lead singer of Zac Brown Band, first announced Sir Rosevelt in 2016. The group's other members are Niko Moon, a frequent co-writer of Brown's, and Ben Simonetti, who provided programming for several tracks on Zac Brown Band's Jekyll + Hyde album. Initially, Brown did not reveal the other members of the group, nor did he provide any press after the release of their first song "Sunday Finest". Later in 2016, he announced the other members and released three more tracks. An album came in December 2017, with the single "Somethin' 'Bout You". Also preceding the album's release was another teaser track titled "The Bravest" which was used by the German television channel ZDF for the 2018 FIFA World Cup.

== Discography ==
=== Albums ===
Title	Album details	Peak positions
Title	Album details	US Heat
Sir Rosevelt	Release date: December 15, 2017; Label: Elektra; Formats: CD, digital download	2

=== Singles ===
Year	Single	Peak positions		Album
Year	Single	US Country	US Country Airplay	Album
2016	"Sunday's Finest"	—	—	Sir Rosevelt
2018	"It Goes On"	39	—	12 Strong Soundtrack
2018	"Somethin' 'Bout You"	42	54	Sir Rosevelt

=== Music videos ===
Year	Video	Director
2017	"Sunday Finest"	Marc Ball
2018	"Somethin' 'Bout You"	Indy Blue
