= Urban Latino =

American Latino magazine

Urban Latino magazine is an American lifestyle publication and website geared toward male and female Hispanic and Latino Americans ages 18–34. It was started in 1994 by a member of an art collective called Sol Concepts and a New York University student. Jorge Cano-Moreno and Rodrigo Salazar are the founders of the magazine, which is based in New York City.
