= Jekyll + Hyde =

Studio album by Zac Brown Band
- Released: April 28, 2015
- Genre: Southern rock; country; country rock; hard rock
- Length: 1:06:02
- Label: Big Machine Records; Republic
- Producer: Zac Brown; CeeLo Green; Jim Hoke; In the Arena Productions; Jay Joyce; Darrell Scott

Zac Brown Band chronology
Uncaged (2012)	Jekyll + Hyde (2015)	Welcome Home (2017)

Singles from Jekyll + Hyde
- 1. "Homegrown" Released: January 12, 2015; 2. "Heavy Is the Head" Released: March 6, 2015; 3. "Loving You Easy" Released: May 4, 2015; 4. "Junkyard" Released: August 4, 2015; 5. "Beautiful Drug" Released: September 21, 2015; 6. "Castaway" Released: April 25, 2016

Jekyll + Hyde is the fourth studio album by American country music group Zac Brown Band. It was released on April 28, 2015. The album's lead single, "Homegrown", was released on January 12, 2015. "Heavy Is the Head", featuring Chris Cornell, was released two months later to the rock format. "Loving You Easy" is the album's second release to country, and third single overall.

== Promotion ==
The band played the songs "Homegrown" and "Dress Blues" from the album at the 2015 College Football Playoff National Championship pregame show. On March 7, 2015, the band performed "Homegrown" and "Heavy Is the Head" on Saturday Night Live, the latter performed with Soundgarden frontman Chris Cornell who provides guest vocals on the track. The band embarked on their Jekyll + Hyde Tour in May 2015 in promotion of the album.

== Commercial performance ==
The album debuted at number one on the US Billboard 200 album chart on the week ending May 3, 2015, earning 228,000 album-equivalent units (214,000 copies of traditional sales), making it their third number one album on the Billboard 200 chart. The album was certified Gold by the RIAA on September 11, 2015. As of August 2016, the album has sold 672,400 copies in the United States.

== Critical reception ==
Professional ratings
Aggregate scores
Source	Rating
Metacritic	55/100
Review scores
Source	Rating
AllMusic	3.5/5 stars
Billboard	3.5/5 stars
Entertainment Weekly	C+
The New York Times	mixed
Rolling Stone	3/5 stars

Carl Wilson of Billboard rated it 3.5 out of 5 stars. His review stated that "The album is a good-faith effort to match or even outstrip the band's onstage eclecticism, and the musical personality shifts help relieve the group's tendency to blandness, providing cover for Brown's dutifully generic, if personable voice. Some longer-standing fans, though, might judge the changes as diabolical as the two-faced Robert Louis Stevenson character that lends the album its name." He also thought that "Dress Blues" was the strongest track. Also giving it 3.5 out of 5, Thom Jurek of Allmusic expressed general favor in the variety of stylistic choices, highlighting "Dress Blues", "Junkyard", "Remedy", "Loving You Easy", and "One Day" in particular, adding that "The stylistic range of Jekyll + Hyde proves that ZBB's reach is almost limitless, and this set will more than likely delight the group's legions of fans." However, he criticized "Wildfire" and the acoustic rendition of "Tomorrow Never Comes" as "unnecessary" and thought that the production was "too bright". Giving it 3 out of 5 stars, Will Hermes of Rolling Stone praised the variety of musical styles on the album, but felt that some of the songs were "a little predictable". He thought that "Dress Blues", written and originally recorded by Jason Isbell, was the strongest track.

Writing for Entertainment Weekly, Kyle Anderson rated the album "C+", stating that "Brown rarely fails to push the boundaries of the genre. It's an admirable outlook to have in the oft-stuffy world of Nashville formalism, and it has led his band to multiplatinum success. But the group's fourth studio full-length goes miles beyond even their most off-the-beaten-path excursions, and not always for the better...Though Brown's vocals adjust to Jekyll + Hyde's multiple personalities, he can't provide enough continuity to keep the album cohesive, and the borderline-goofy gambits are more distracting than interesting. The album certainly proves that ZBB have range. But at some point, experimentation swerves into self-indulgence, and Brown never gets around to solving Jekyll's identity crisis." He thought that "Young and Wild" and "Heavy Is the Head" were the strongest tracks. Jon Caramanica of The New York Times gave a mixed review, stating that the album "suggests a path forward. Rather than follow the hip-hop hybrids of the day, the album offers a huge amalgam of soft rock, country-rock, hard rock, heavyish metal, big band music, bluegrass and, yes, a touch of electronic music." Caramanica was also critical of Brown's singing, saying that his "unimaginative voice can gum up a song, as it does here on 'Dress Blues,' and he rarely moves past lyrical platitudes. When he evokes Kenny Rogers, as on 'One Day,' it's effective, but more often it's a liability." He also thought of the musical arrangements that "Even when Mr. Brown is taking it easy, though, the band is working hard, eager to show it's trapped inside a flimsy box."

== Track listing ==
No.	Title	Writer(s)	Producer	Length
1.	"Beautiful Drug"	Zac Brown, Niko Moon	In the Arena Productions	3:11
2.	"Loving You Easy"	Brown, Moon, Al Anderson	In the Arena Productions	2:35
3.	"Remedy"	Brown, Moon, Wyatt Durrette, Keb' Mo'	In the Arena Productions, Darrell Scott	3:51
4.	"Homegrown"	Brown, Moon, Durrette	Zac Brown, Jay Joyce	3:25
5.	"Mango Tree" (featuring Sara Bareilles)	Brown, Moon, Anna Harwood	In the Arena Productions, Scott, Jim Hoke	3:41
6.	"Heavy Is the Head" (featuring Chris Cornell)	Brown, Moon, Durrette, John Driskell Hopkins, Jimmy De Martini, Scott	In the Arena Productions, Scott	3:59
7.	"Bittersweet"	Brown, Moon, Durrette	Brown, Joyce	5:10
8.	"Castaway"	Brown, Moon, Durrette, Coy Bowles, Hopkins	In the Arena Productions	3:08
9.	"Tomorrow Never Comes"	Brown, Moon, Durrette	In the Arena Productions	3:58
10.	"One Day"	Brown, Durrette, Rich Robinson, Sarah Dugas, Christian Dugas, Matt Mangano	In the Arena Productions, CeeLo Green	3:49
11.	"Dress Blues" (featuring Jewel)	Jason Isbell	In the Arena Productions	5:30
12.	"Young and Wild"	Brown, Moon, Durrette, Amos Lee, Bowles	In the Arena Productions	3:14
13.	"Junkyard" (contains elements of "Is There Anybody Out There?" by Pink Floyd)	Brown, Roger Waters	In the Arena Productions	7:13
14.	"I'll Be Your Man (Song for a Daughter)"	Brown, Moon, Durrette, Bowles, Scott, Hopkins	In the Arena Productions, Scott	5:48
15.	"Wildfire"	Brown, Eric Church, Durrette, Liz Rose, Clay Cook	In the Arena Productions	2:46
16.	"Tomorrow Never Comes" (acoustic version)	Brown, Moon, Durrette	In the Arena Productions	4:36
Total length:				1:06:02

== Personnel ==
Compiled from liner notes.

=== Zac Brown Band ===
- Zac Brown – lead vocals, acoustic guitar, electric guitar, banjo, programming
- Coy Bowles – electric guitar, slide guitar, resonator guitar, Hammond organ, Wurlitzer electric piano
- Clay Cook – background vocals, piano, keyboards, electric guitar, Mellotron, Hammond organ, ukulele, clavinet, pedal steel guitar, Fender Rhodes electric piano, Wurlitzer electric piano, glockenspiel, National guitar
- Daniel de los Reyes – percussion
- Jimmy De Martini – background vocals, violin, fiddle, strings, cello, acoustic guitar
- Chris Fryar – drums
- John Driskell Hopkins – background vocals, baritone guitar, acoustic guitar, electric guitar, banjo, ukulele
- Matt Mangano – electric bass guitar, acoustic bass guitar, double bass, acoustic guitar, electric guitar

=== Additional musicians ===
- Sara Bareilles – duet vocals (track 5)
- Vinnie Ciesleski – trumpet (track 5)
- Chris Cornell – duet vocals (track 6)
- Donald Dunlavey – electric guitar (track 6)
- Béla Fleck – banjo (tracks 9, 13)
- Barry Green – trombone (track 5)
- Steve Herrmann – trumpet (track 5)
- John Hinchey – trumpet (track 5)
- Jim Hoke – tenor saxophone (track 5), flute (track 5)
- Byron House – double bass (track 16)
- Jewel – background vocals (track 11)
- Jay Joyce – percussion (track 4), programming (track 4)
- Randy Leago – baritone saxophone (track 5)
- Michael McGoldrick – Uileann pipes (track 3), Irish flute (track 3), pennywhistle (track 3)
- Niko Moon – background vocals (track 1), programming (tracks 3, 13)
- Mickey Raphael – harmonica (track 16)
- Darrell Scott – acoustic guitar (tracks 3, 16), electric guitar (tracks 3, 6), banjolin (track 3), pedal steel guitar (tracks 6, 16), background vocals (tracks 6, 14), "acoustic stringed instrument" (track 14), piano (track 16)
- Ben Simonetti – programming (tracks 1, 2, 3, 10, 12), trumpet (track 10)

Choir on "Remedy" and "I'll Be Your Man": Darrell Scott, Maureen Murphy, Sarah Dugas, John Cowan, Odessa Settles, Rick Jones, Jason Eskridge

=== Technical ===
- Brandon Bell – engineering (tracks 3, 6, 8, 11, 13, 14, 15), mixing (tracks 11, 14, 15)
- Chris Bellman – mastering (all tracks)
- Mario Borgatta – mix assistant (track 13)
- Zac Brown – production (tracks 4, 7)
- Martin Cooke – engineering (track 13)
- Paul Cossette – engineering (track 7)
- Rich Costey – mixing (track 13)
- Nicholas Fournier – engineering (track 13)
- CeeLo Green – production (track 10)
- Jason Hall – mixing (track 4), engineering (tracks 4, 7)
- Jim Hoke – production (track 5)
- In the Arena Productions – production (all tracks except 4, 7)
- Jay Joyce – production (tracks 4, 7), mixing (track 4)
- Kyle Lehning – engineering (track 5)
- Sean Phelan – engineering (track 10)
- Anthony Ruotolo – engineering (track 5)
- Andrew Scheps – mixing (all tracks except 4, 9, 11, 13, 14)
- Darrell Scott – production (tracks 3, 5, 6, 14)
- Ben Simonetti – engineering (tracks 1, 2, 5, 6, 9, 10, 12, 16), mixing (track 9)
- Kyle Stevens – engineering (track 6)
- Tom Syrowski – engineering (track 6)

== Charts ==
=== Weekly charts ===
Chart (2015)	Peak position
Australian Albums (ARIA)	6
Canadian Albums (Billboard)	1
Swiss Albums (Schweizer Hitparade)	66
UK Albums (OCC)	36
US Billboard 200	1
US Top Country Albums (Billboard)	1

=== Year-end charts ===
Chart (2015)	Position
Canadian Albums (Billboard)	35
US Billboard 200	24
US Top Country Albums (Billboard)	3
Chart (2016)	Position
US Billboard 200	112
US Top Country Albums (Billboard)	22
Chart (2017)	Position
US Top Country Albums (Billboard)	62

== Certifications ==
Region	Certification	Certified units/sales
Canada (Music Canada)	Gold	40,000^{^}
United States (RIAA)	Platinum	1,000,000^{‡}
^{^} Shipments figures based on certification alone.^{‡} Sales+streaming figures based on certification alone.
