= Devoted Spirits: A Tribute to Earth Wind and Fire =

Studio album by Devoted Spirits
- Released: Nov 2, 2004
- Genre: R&B
- Label: Thump Records

Professional ratings
Review scores
Source	Rating
Allmusic	3/5 stars

Devoted Spirits: A Tribute to Earth Wind and Fire is a tribute album to the R&B band Earth, Wind & Fire by the band Devoted Spirits which consists of former EWF members Larry Dunn, Sheldon Reynolds and Morris Pleasure. The album was released in 2004 on Thump Records.

== Track listing ==
No.	Title	Writer(s)	Length
1.	"Devoted Spirits Intro"	Philip Bailey, Maurice White	0:21
2.	"September/Mighty Mighty"	Charles Stepney, Maurice White, Verdine White	4:40
3.	"Sunshine"	Philip Bailey, Al McKay, Maurice White	4:34
4.	"Serpentine Fire"	Sonny Burke, Maurice White, Verdine White	4:49
5.	"All About Love (Interlude)"	Larry Dunn, Maurice White	1:46
6.	"Smooth/Can't Hide Love"	Skip Scarborough	4:18
7.	"Fantasy"	Eduardo Del Barrio, Maurice White, Verdine White	4:05
8.	"Brazilian Rhyme/In the Name of Love (Interlude)"		1:28
9.	"Alpha/After the Love Has Gone"	Bill Champlin, David Foster, Jay Graydon	4:30
10.	"Stand Up Now (Interlude)"	Sheldon Reynolds	0:22
11.	"That's the Way of the World"	Charles Stepney, Maurice White, Verdine White	4:20
12.	"Devotion"	Philip Bailey, Maurice White	1:52
13.	"Runnin'"	Eduardo Del Barrio, Larry Dunn, Skip Scarborough, Maurice White	1:58
14.	"Sunday Morning (Interlude)"	Sheldon M. Reynolds, Maurice White, Allee Willis	0:35
15.	"Serpentine Fire (Interlude)"	Sonny Burke, Maurice White, Verdine White	1:49
16.	"Sunday Morning"	Sheldon M. Reynolds, Maurice White, Allee Willis	4:32
17.	"Rhythm of Love"	Derek Clark, Sheldon M. Reynolds	4:25
18.	"See the Light"	Philip Bailey, Larry Dunn, Louise Hardy	4:57
19.	"Light of Day (Interlude)"	Sheldon Reynolds	1:48
20.	"Loves Holiday"	Skip Scarborough, Maurice White	3:55
21.	"Rock That"	David Foster, Maurice White	4:38
22.	"Faces"	Larry Dunn, Maurice White, Verdine White	5:49
