= Zac Brown Band =

American country music band

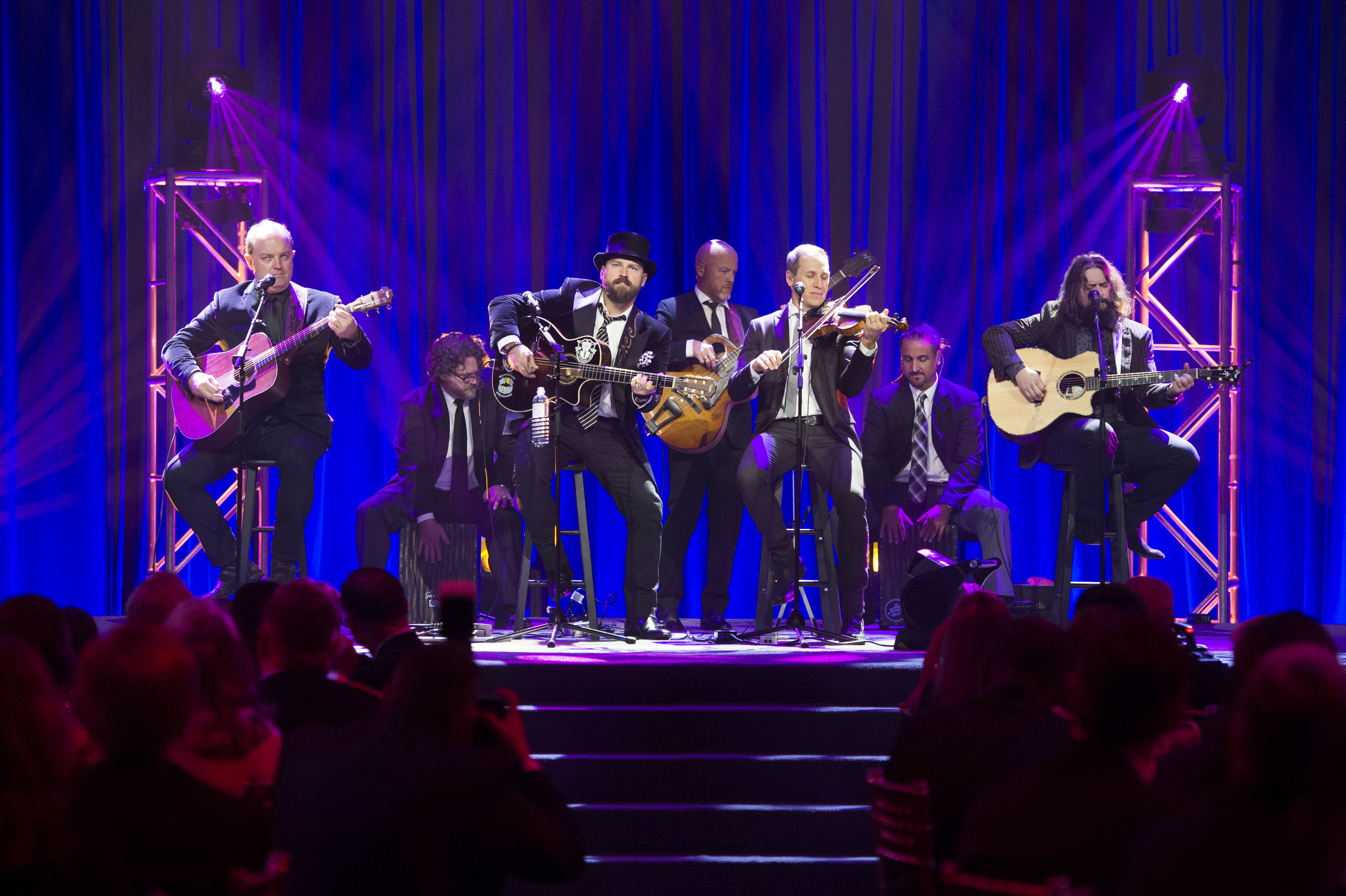
- Zac Brown Band at the USO Annual Service Member of the Year Gala in 2016

Background information
- Origin: Atlanta, Georgia, U.S.
- Genres: Country; country rock; country pop; Southern rock
- Years active: 2002–present
- Labels: Bigger Picture; Southern Ground; Atlantic; RPM; Big Machine; Republic; Elektra; BMG; Master of None
- Spinoffs: Sir Rosevelt
- Members: Zac Brown; Coy Bowles; Clay Cook; Daniel de los Reyes; Matt Mangano; Jimmy De Martini; Chris Fryar; John Driskell Hopkins; Caroline Jones
- Past members: Tim Ussery; Jacob Lawson; Marcus Petruska; Joel Williams
- Website: zacbrownband.com

The Zac Brown Band is an American country music band based in Atlanta, Georgia. The lineup consists of Zac Brown (lead vocals, guitar), Jimmy De Martini (fiddle, vocals), John Driskell Hopkins (bass guitar, guitar, baritone guitar, banjo, ukulele, upright bass, vocals), Coy Bowles (guitar, keyboards), Chris Fryar (drums), Clay Cook (guitar, keyboards, mandolin, steel guitar, vocals), Matt Mangano (bass guitar), Daniel de los Reyes (percussion), and Caroline Jones (guitar, keyboards, harmonica, vocals).

The band has released seven studio albums, three live albums, one greatest hits album, and three extended plays. They have had 16 singles on the Billboard Hot Country Songs or Country Airplay chart, of which 13 have reached number 1. Their first album, The Foundation, is certified triple-platinum by the Recording Industry Association of America, while its follow-ups, You Get What You Give and Uncaged, are certified platinum. They have collaborated with artists such as Alan Jackson, Angie Aparo, Jimmy Buffett, Kid Rock, Jason Mraz, Dave Grohl, Chris Cornell, Brandi Carlile, Avicii, Los Lonely Boys, Sara Barellies and John Fogerty of Creedence Clearwater Revival.

== History ==
=== Formation ===
In 2002, Brown was traveling with a heavy tour schedule of approximately 200 dates a year. The initial Zac Brown Band lineup consisted of Brown, on acoustic guitar and lead vocals, backed by drummer Marcus Petruska and bass guitarist Jacob Lawson. In 2003, Brown started his own label, called Home Grown—it was later renamed "Southern Ground".

In 2004, Brown opened a music club and restaurant with his father in the Lake Oconee area of Georgia, called "Zac's Place" where the fare was southern-style cooking. A developer bought the restaurant and, in turn, the Zac Brown Band bought a tour bus and began touring full-time, playing rock and country clubs, as well as folk and jam band festivals. The release of the Zac Brown Band's first independent album, Home Grown, occurred during the same year.

Also in 2004, Brown added violinist/fiddler and tenor vocalist Jimmy De Martini to the lineup. According to an interview with De Martini, he explained that Wyatt Durrette, Brown's frequent songwriting collaborator, was working as a bartender at Sidelines Sports Bar in Kennesaw, Georgia, at the time, where the Zac Brown Band frequently performed. Durette suggested De Martini to Brown, who was wanting a "lead instrument" in his band, as well as a harmony singer. After doing several performances with the band at the club, Brown asked De Martini to become a permanent member, to which De Martini gladly obliged.

Brown met John Driskell Hopkins in 1998 when Hopkins was hosting an open mic night at CJ's Landing in Buckhead, Georgia. Hopkins later recorded Home Grown in his music studio, Brighter Shade Studios. The two remained friends, and in 2005, Hopkins stepped in as bass guitarist while helping the group finish what became their number-one single "Toes". "Toes" was the second single from the band's major-label debut, The Foundation, which was partially recorded in Hopkins' studio. You Get What You Give was also partially recorded in Brighter Shade Studios.

Coy Bowles transferred to Atlanta's Georgia State University to study music. He subsequently became involved in Atlanta's various music scenes, and eventually formed Coy Bowles and the Fellowship in 2004. Two years later, Bowles decided to reconnect with Brown. Through mutual friends, he learned that the Zac Brown Band was scheduled to perform in Atlanta one evening. Bowles and Brown spent the afternoon prior to the performance reacquainting with each other, which ended with Brown inviting Bowles to sit in with his band at that night's performance. To return the favor, Bowles invited the band to attend his own gig with the Fellowship a couple of months later, which in turn resulted in Brown and his band sitting in at that gig.

This turn of events continued for eight months until Bowles concluded that it was too overwhelming to balance his time with Brown's band and his own band, in addition to other activities; he therefore made a decision to put the Fellowship on an indefinite hiatus, and became a permanent member of the Zac Brown Band.

In 2008, the Zac Brown Band signed to Live Nation Artists Records, in association with Brown's own Home Grown label, after Chris Fryar became an addition to the band. An Alabama native, Fryar attended the University of North Texas and the Mississippi University for Women, and made a name for himself in the Birmingham music scene. According to Fryar, a mutual friend recommended him to Brown, who was in need of a new drummer for the band. Fryar, who in turn had just finished a stint with a previous band, subsequently auditioned and shortly afterward became the Zac Brown Band's newest member.

=== Commercial success ===
The Zac Brown Band's debut single, "Chicken Fried", was originally recorded in 2003 and included on the Home Grown album, but later re-recorded and released to country radio in 2008. This song was also recorded by The Lost Trailers, whose 2006 recording was released as a single but withdrawn after Brown decided that he wanted to release it himself. Brown also co-wrote "Simple Life", a song recorded by The Lost Trailers on their 2006 self-titled album.

In the third episode of HBO's music documentary series Sonic Highways, Brown was a featured interviewee and explained why Lost Trailer's version of "Chicken Fried" was pulled from the radio. Brown stated that after six years of touring that he was broke and sleeping in his tour van. In 2005 the Lost Trailers contacted Brown and expressed interest in recording "Chicken Fried". Brown stated he agreed under the condition that the song would only be an album cut and not a single as he still had hopes of releasing the song as a radio single himself.

Both parties agreed and the Lost Trailers recorded the song. Some months later the Lost Trailers landed a deal with Sony Nashville, and when they submitted the tracks for their album, they included "Chicken Fried". Joe Galante, then the Chairman of Sony Music Nashville, heard the tracks and chose "Chicken Fried" as the single that the label wanted to promote.

Brown described hearing his song on the radio: "The first time I hear 'Chicken Fried' on the radio and it wasn't us singing it. It was a nightmare." Brown then called his lawyer to have the song pulled from the radio immediately. Brown's lawyer warned him that because of Galante's power in the Nashville music scene that pulling the song could essentially have him blackballed in Nashville. Brown was insistent that his agreement with the Lost Trailers was violated, so his lawyer issued a cease and desist letter and the single was pulled from the radio.

A few months later The Zac Brown Band was booked to perform at 3rd and Lindsley in Nashville and producer Keith Stegall came to watch their performance. Stegall and Brown had drinks later that night and Brown recalled Stegall stating, "I just had to meet the kid that told Joe Galante to fuck off!" Brown credits this incident and his meeting and collaboration with Stegall as the beginning of his success in the music business.

In October 2008, Atlantic Records acquired distribution of "Chicken Fried" after Live Nation Artists closed. The band's album The Foundation was released under Atlantic Records' newly re-established country division in association with the Home Grown/Bigger Picture label on November 18 of that year. "Chicken Fried" reached No. 1 on the country charts that same month, making them the first country band to reach No. 1 with a debut single since Heartland did so in 2006 with "I Loved Her First".

=== Addition of Clay Cook ===
In January 2009, two months after "Chicken Fried" went to No. 1, Atlanta native Clay Cook joined the Zac Brown Band as its multi-instrumentalist and high tenor vocalist. Cook had previously collaborated with John Mayer and Shawn Mullins, and was also a member of the Marshall Tucker Band for two years prior to joining the Zac Brown Band.

Cook explains how he first met Brown:

We ran into each other (in) 2003 in a club scene in Atlanta, where my band opened up for his band ... ever since then, we've been friendly ... and I think he just thought I was a singer-songwriter for a long time; and then we were on a (music) cruise ship together ... and I was playing with the Marshall Tucker Band at the time, and (Brown)'s band (also participated in the cruise) ... and he actually got to see me play the guitar ... and then he realized, 'I need this guy in my band,' I guess.

Brown himself admitted his strong desire to add Cook to the lineup, for he believed Cook's musicianship would enhance the Zac Brown Band's overall musical style:

I'd been tryin' to get him in the band for three years, and you know, it's been a journey, but I always knew [he could make us better]. I'm a harmony fanatic. I love big harmonies and things, and we didn't have a high tenor, and Jimmy [De Martini], my fiddle player, sings a lot of the high stuff now, but havin' somebody that can actually sing on top of that, we've added a four-part harmony now that's searing, and the guy's a monster player, too."

With the new Zac Brown Band lineup completed, the band released its second single, "Whatever It Is", which went to No. 2. In October 2009, a third single, "Toes", became the band's second Number One. The album's fourth single, and third No. 1, was "Highway 20 Ride". "Free" was the album's fifth single and on the week of August 21, 2010, it also peaked at Number One.

=== Uncaged and The Grohl Sessions, Vol. 1 ===
On April 25, 2012, it was announced via the Zac Brown Band's website that percussionist Daniel de los Reyes had joined the band on a permanent basis. De los Reyes had previously performed with the band as a touring musician and participated in the recording of their album Uncaged. De los Reyes has also performed with artists and groups such as Earth, Wind and Fire, Jennifer Lopez and Sting. Billboard considered the album to be the best country album of 2012 as of its release. "Goodbye in Her Eyes" reached Number One on the Country Airplay chart in 2013. The album's third single, "Jump Right In", was released to country radio on February 25, 2013. It peaked at number 2 on the Country Airplay chart in August 2013. The album's fourth single, "Sweet Annie", was released to country radio in August 2013, and rose to number 1 in January 2014. The music video for this track features footage of band member Coy Bowles’ actual wedding.

On January 7, 2013, Zac Brown Band performed the National Anthem at the 2013 BCS National Championship Game between the Alabama Crimson Tide and the Notre Dame Fighting Irish at Sun Life Stadium in Miami. Just two weeks later on January 20, 2013, the band performed the National Anthem during the NFC Championship Game between the Seattle Seahawks and the San Francisco 49ers at the CenturyLink Field in Seattle. In December 2013, the band released a digital four-song EP titled The Grohl Sessions, Vol. 1, produced by Dave Grohl of Foo Fighters. It was later given a physical release featuring a 45-minute DVD on the album's creation. "All Alright" was released as a single from the EP, charting at number 17 on Country Airplay.

On January 1, 2014, Zac Brown Band performed the National Anthem during the NHL's Winter Classic between the Detroit Red Wings & Toronto Maple Leafs at Michigan Stadium in Ann Arbor, Michigan, home of the Michigan Wolverines football team. In April 2014, the band announced its summer tour schedule, which included Kacey Musgraves as an opening act, and the addition of Matt Mangano as an eighth member. Mangano previously performed live with Zac Brown Band when they performed "Blackbird" on the "Pass The Jar" live album. Mangano assumed the role of bass guitarist, while original bassist John Driskell Hopkins began adding other instruments in his arsenal such as standard six-string guitar, seven-string guitar, baritone guitar, ukulele, double bass, and banjo.

The Zac Brown Band announced on January 12, 2015, that it had finalized a four-way strategic partnership involving the Southern Ground Artists record label, Big Machine Label Group, Republic Records, and John Varvatos Records for the release of its fourth studio album. The terms of the deal state that the Zac Brown Band will work with Big Machine Label Group for marketing and distribution, while Southern Ground Artists will work on radio promotion, Republic will provide support in the area of non-country radio formats and international promotion, and Varvatos will oversee branding and styling. Brown stated in a press release:

Southern Ground Artists together with John Varvatos Records, Big Machine Label Group, and Republic Records is the dream team for Zac Brown Band's evolution ... We're excited to reach new music fans worldwide.

=== Jekyll + Hyde and Welcome Home ===
The band signed to Big Machine Records in 2015 and released its sixteenth single, "Homegrown", in January. The song, co-produced by Jay Joyce, was the lead single to an album, titled Jekyll + Hyde, which was released on April 28, 2015. Despite being a country album, Jekyll + Hyde features prominent styles from other genres in several of its tracks including rock (Heavy Is the Head), EDM (Beautiful Drug), celtic (Remedy), reggae (Castaway) and traditional pop/jazz (Mango Tree).

On Saturday, March 7, 2015, the band made their Saturday Night Live debut, performing "Homegrown" and "Heavy is the Head".

The band contributed vocals on the Avicii song "Broken Arrows", released in September 2015.

Jekyll + Hyde is the first album that ZBB recorded when they weren't on the road.

On January 30, 2017, the band previewed cover art for a new album titled Welcome Home produced by Dave Cobb, was released on May 12, 2017. The first single from the album, "My Old Man", was released on February 3, 2017. Their latest song "Roots" was released on May 3, 2017. The band performed the song on The Tonight Show Starring Jimmy Fallon on March 29, 2017. In September 2018, it was announced that Zac Brown Band would make their second appearance of CMT Crossroads along with Shawn Mendes, which was televised on October 24, 2018.

=== The Owl ===
The band released their sixth album The Owl on September 20, 2019. The album includes collaborations with Skrillex, Max Martin, Ryan Tedder, Benny Blanco, Andrew Watt, Jason "Poo Bear" Boyd, and others. A digital single from the album, "Leaving Love Behind" was released on July 26, 2019. Brown describes some songs on the album as "personal" and "pretty heavy." Concurrently, Brown released a solo album called Controversy, accompanied by a new single called "Swayze".

=== The Comeback ===
On October 15, 2021, the band released their seventh album The Comeback. The first single from the album, "Same Boat", was released on June 11, 2021, by Homegrown Music and Waner Music Nashville. The song became the band's first number one single on the Country Airplay chart since 2016's "Beautiful Drug" and their fourteenth overall. The album's second single "Out in the Middle" was released in January 2022 and reached number thirteen. A deluxe edition of the album was released in September 2022 and features several tracks reimagined as duets featuring Blake Shelton, Ingrid Andress and Jamey Johnson, Cody Johnson and Jimmy Buffett. On November 3, 2022, it was announced that Caroline Jones had joined the group as an official member after having opened for and toured with the band since 2017 becoming the band's first female member.

=== Love & Fear ===
Their eighth album, Love & Fear was released on December 5, 2025. The lead single, "Let It Run" featuring Snoop Dogg was released on July 18, 2025. The album also features Dolly Parton and Marcus King. To help promote the album, the band has a four show residency, Love & Fear at the Sphere in Paradise, Nevada.

== Collaborations and appearances ==
Along with recent commercial success, the band has made appearances at The Hangout Music Festival, Hullabalou Music Festival and the Bonnaroo Music Festival in 2006, 2009, and 2010 along with an opening slot for the Dave Matthews Band during their 2010 Summer Tour. Also, after several years as perennial favorites on the annual The Rock Boat theme-cruise, the Zac Brown Band has been elevated to hosting their own theme-cruise, Sailing Southern Ground, in September 2010. In Fall of 2009, the band began offering fan-club members the ability to purchase tickets to VIP Eat & Greet experiences before the majority of their tour appearances. These events afford fans the opportunity to share a meal with band-members before the show, and have become an integral part of the overall Zac Brown Band live experience.

In 2011, the Zac Brown Band and Blackberry Smoke held a concert tour at venues and amphitheaters including Hollywood Bowl in Los Angeles, CA.

On April 28, 2013, the Zac Brown Band headlined the 2013 Stagecoach Festival in Indio, California.

Zac Brown Band completed a three-night, headlining stint at Red Rocks Amphitheatre on Wednesday, May 8, 2013, Thursday, May 9, 2013, and Friday, May 10, 2013. All three performances were sold out.

On September 6, 2013, Zac Brown sat in with The String Cheese Incident and performed as the Zac Brown Incident during the inaugural Lockin' Festival in Arrington, VA.

On November 6, 2013, Zac Brown Band performed at the 2013 CMA awards with Dave Grohl on drums, debuting their new song "Day for the Dead". On November 24, while being interviewed at the American Music Awards, Grohl revealed that he recently produced the band's new EP.

On January 21, 2014, Zac Brown Band released a live version of their 2010 #1 hit "Free" (transitioning into the Van Morrison classic "Into the Mystic"). The track features Clare Bowen and precedes their January 22 appearance on the ABC TV show Nashville. The song(s) were recorded at the 2013 Southern Ground Music & Food Festival in Nashville.

In 2016, Zac Brown formed a side-project, Sir Rosevelt, that released several singles and announced an album that was released December 15, 2017.

Zac Brown Band re-recorded the song "From Now On" from The Greatest Showman, as part of a compilation album, The Greatest Showman: Reimagined. The album was released on November 16, 2018.

Brown performed "Colder Weather" at the 2019 Musicians Hall of Fame and Museum Concert and Induction Ceremony.

Zac Brown Band performed at the UFC Freedom 250 at the South Lawn of the White House in Washington, DC on June 14, 2026.

== Revenue ==
In 2015, Forbes estimated that Zac Brown Band's annual income was $32 million.

== Philanthropy ==
The band has also supported Little Kids Rock, a national nonprofit that works to restore and revitalize music education programs in disadvantaged U.S. public schools, by donating items for auction to raise money for the organization. On January 16, 2013, Zac Brown, Clay Cook, and David Ryan Harris played a benefit with John Mayer for the firefighters and the residents of Pine Creek in Park County, Montana, who fought a fire that swept through the area, and destroyed five homes.

== Band members ==
=== Current members ===
- Zac Brown – lead vocals, guitar, banjo, bass guitar (2002–present)
- Jimmy De Martini – harmony and backing vocals, fiddle, violin, guitar, mandolin, cello (2004–present)
- John Driskell Hopkins – harmony and backing vocals, occasional lead vocals (2005–present); bass guitar, double bass (2005–2014); guitar, baritone guitar, ukulele, banjo (2013–present)
- Coy Bowles – guitar, slide guitar, Hammond organ, piano, Wurlitzer electric piano, resonator guitar (2007–present)
- Chris Fryar – drums, percussion (2008–present)
- Clay Cook – harmony and backing vocals, occasional lead vocals, guitar, slide guitar, keyboards, Hammond organ, piano, Wurlitzer and Fender Rhodes electric pianos, Mellotron, clavinet, pedal steel guitar, glockenspiel, National guitar (2009–present)
- Daniel de los Reyes – percussion (2012–present)
- Matt Mangano – bass guitar, guitar, double bass, backing vocals (2014–present)
- Caroline Jones – vocals, guitar, keyboards, harmonica (2022–present)

=== Former members ===
- Marcus Petruska – drums, percussion, backing vocals (2003–2008)
- Jacob Lawson – bass guitar (2003–2005)
- Tim Ussery – guitar, mandolin, bass guitar (2003–2005)
- Joel Williams – guitar (2005–2008)

== Discography ==
- The Foundation (2008)
- You Get What You Give (2010)
- Uncaged (2012)
- Jekyll + Hyde (2015)
- Welcome Home (2017)
- The Owl (2019)
- The Comeback (2021)
- Love & Fear (2025)

== Tours ==
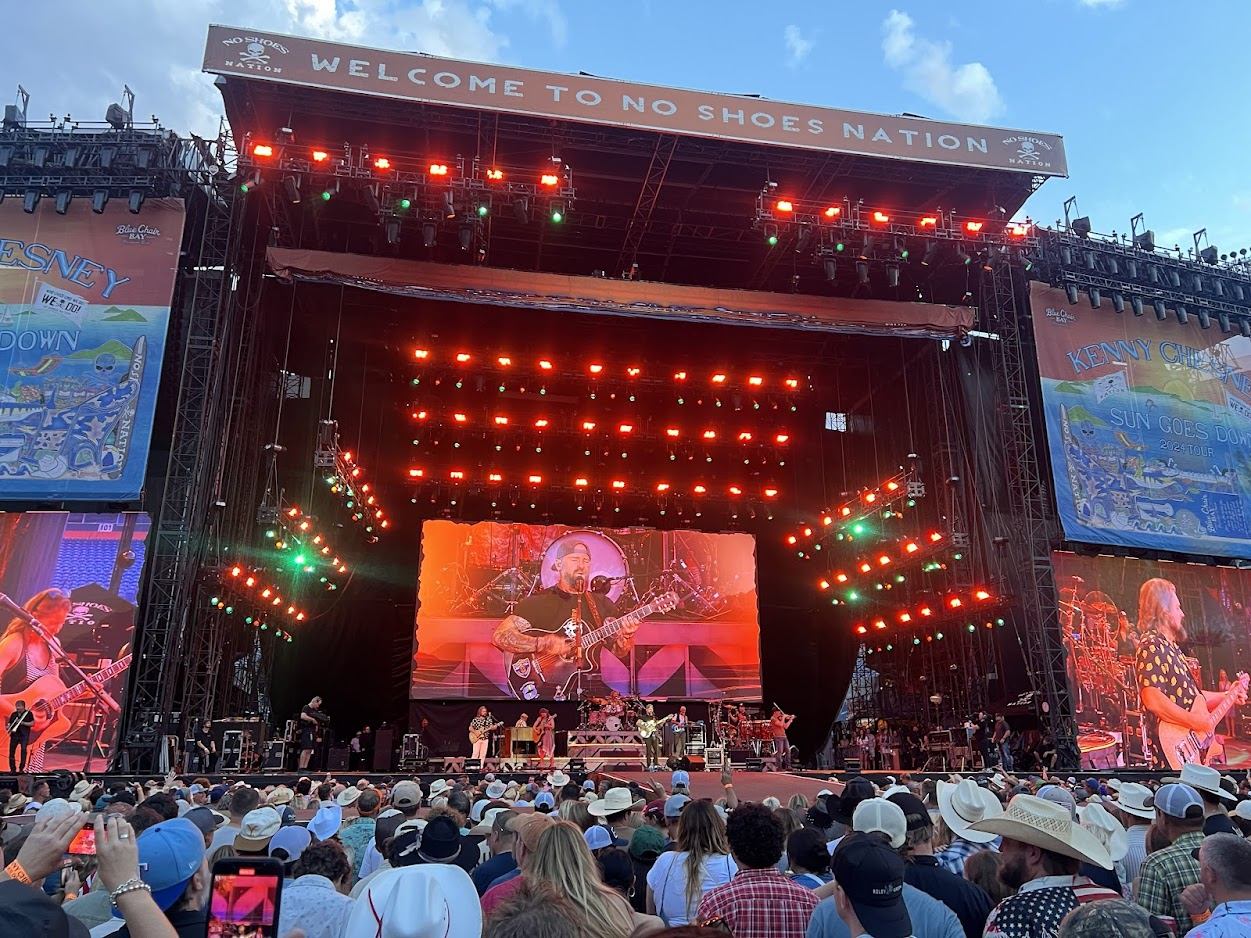
Zac Brown Band performing at Empower Field at Mile High in Denver during the Sun Goes Down Tour

=== Headlining ===
- Uncaged Tour (2012–13)
- The Great American Road Trip Tour (2014)
- Jekyll + Hyde Tour (2015)
- Black Out The Sun Tour (2016)
- Welcome Home Tour (2017)
- Down the Rabbit Hole Live (2018–19)
- The Owl Tour (2019)
- The Comeback Tour (2021)
- Out In The Middle Tour (2022)
- From the Fire Tour (2023)
- Love and Fear Tour (2026)

==== Jekyll and Hyde Tour ====
Promotional poster for tour

The Jekyll and Hyde Tour (stylized as the Jekyll + Hyde Tour) was a headlining concert tour by the Zac Brown Band, in support of their fourth studio album Jekyll + Hyde (2015). The tour began on May 1, 2015 in Nashville, Tennessee and finished on December 11 that year in Grand Rapids, Michigan. This was the sixteenth ranked tour of 2015 and grossed $45.2 million in revenue.

Zac Brown Band announced the tour in March 2015. Nine of the shows were to take place at baseball parks including historic stadiums such as Fenway Park and Wrigley Field. A London date was announced in May 2015. $1 from every ticket sold was to go to Brown's "Camp Southern Ground", a camp that gives kids "including those with social and emotional problems, a chance to go away to camp."

The shows last for two and a half hours, and the stage is a three-story tier, and LED screens. The band played twenty-six numbers including most of the tracks off Jekyll + Hyde, past favorites, and covers of "Kashmir (song)" by Led Zeppelin, "Let It Be" by The Beatles, "Bohemian Rhapsody" by Queen, "Under the Bridge" by the Red Hot Chili Peppers and "Enter Sandman" by Metallica. Not only are there country music elements in the show but there is also EDM, rock and pop. At the end of "Dress Blues" the video screen shows a flag-folding ceremony for a veteran. Photos of "Camp Southern Ground" is displayed on the screens during "Remedy" During "Junkyard" a fifteen-foot dragon controlled by the leg work of the band, wound its way around the stage. The kickoff show in Nashville had guest appearances from, Jewel, Kid Rock, Béla Fleck and Drake White.

Adam Gold of Rolling Stone wrote that "Brown and his band" "never shy away from taking risks and don't back down from broadening an already exceedingly eclectic sonic palette." With all the new tricks up Zac Brown Band's sleeve, Gold felt like Brown "wasn't fully convinced" that they "were working yet."

=== Co-headlining ===
- Goin' Coastal Tour with Kenny Chesney (2011)
- Sun Goes Down Tour with Kenny Chesney (2024)

=== Residency ===
- Love & Fear (2025)

== Awards ==
Since 2009, the Zac Brown Band has earned 55 award nominations from the Grammys, Academy of Country Music, American Music Awards, Country Music Association and Country Music Television, and has won 8.

They have received four nominations for the 2009 CMA Awards: New Artist of the Year, Song of the Year, Single of the Year, and Music Video of the Year for their No. 1 single, "Chicken Fried". That same year, they received three Grammy nominations for Best Country Album, Best Country Performance By a Duo or Group With Vocals and Best New Artist. On January 31, 2010, the band won the Grammy award for Best New Artist, making them the only country group to win this award.

The Zac Brown Band was also nominated in 2009 for three ACM awards, "Album of the Year", "Vocal Group of the Year", and was one of eight contenders for "Entertainer of the Year".

The Zac Brown Band led the nominees for the 46th annual Academy of Country Music Awards 2011, with a total of nine nominations including: Vocal Group of the Year, Album of the Year, Single Record of the Year, Song of the Year, Vocal Event of the Year.

Year	Association	Category	Result	Ref.
2009	Academy of Country Music	Best New Artist	Nominated	
2009	Academy of Country Music	Best New Vocal Duo or Group	Won	
2009	CMT Music Awards	USA Weekend Breakthrough Video of the Year — "Chicken Fried"	Won	
2009	Country Music Association Awards	New Artist of the Year	Nominated	
2009	Country Music Association Awards	Vocal Group of the Year	Nominated	
2009	Country Music Association Awards	Single of the Year — "Chicken Fried"	Nominated	
2009	Country Music Association Awards	Song of the Year — "Chicken Fried"	Nominated	
2010	Academy of Country Music	Entertainer of the Year	Nominated	
2010	Academy of Country Music	Best Vocal Group of the Year	Nominated	
2010	Academy of Country Music	Album of the Year — The Foundation	Nominated	
2010	Academy of Country Music	Single Record of the Year — "Toes"	Nominated	
2010	CMT Music Awards	Video of the Year – "Toes"	Nominated	
2010	CMT Music Awards	Group Video of the Year – "Toes"	Nominated	
2010	CMT Music Awards	Group Video of the Year – "Highway 20 Ride"	Nominated	
2010	Country Music Association Awards	Entertainer of the Year	Nominated	
2010	Country Music Association Awards	New Artist of the Year	Won	
2011	Academy of Country Music	Vocal Group of the Year	Nominated	
2011	Academy of Country Music	Single of the Year — "As She's Walking Away" (feat. Alan Jackson)	Nominated	
2011	Academy of Country Music	Song of the Year — "As She's Walking Away" (feat. Alan Jackson)	Nominated	
2011	Academy of Country Music	Album of the Year — "You Get What You Give"	Nominated	
2011	Academy of Country Music	Vocal Event of the Year — "As She's Walking Away" (feat. Alan Jackson)	Won	
2011	CMT Music Awards	Video of the Year - "Colder Weather"	Nominated	
2011	CMT Music Awards	Group Video of the Year - "Colder Weather"	Nominated	
2011	CMT Music Awards	Performance of the Year - "Margaritaville" (Performed by Zac Brown Band and Jimmy Buffett)	Won	
2011	Country Music Association Awards	Vocal Group of the Year	Nominated	
2011	Country Music Association Awards	Single of the Year - "Colder Weather"	Nominated	
2011	Country Music Association Awards	Song of the Year - "Colder Weather"	Nominated	
2011	Country Music Association Awards	Album of the Year - "You Get What You Give"	Nominated	
2011	Country Music Association Awards	Musical Event of the Year - "As She's Walking Away" (feat. Alan Jackson)	Nominated	
2011	American Music Awards	Favorite Country Band/Duo/Group	Nominated	
2011	American Country Awards	Artist of the Year	Nominated	
2011	American Country Awards	Duo/Group Artist of the Year	Nominated	
2011	American Country Awards	Album of the Year - "You Get What You Give"	Nominated	
2011	American Country Awards	Single of the Year - "As She's Walking Away" (feat. Alan Jackson)	Nominated	
2011	American Country Awards	Single By a Duo/Group - "Colder Weather"	Nominated	
2011	American Country Awards	Single By a Vocal Collaboration - "As She's Walking Away" (feat. Alan Jackson)	Nominated	
2011	American Country Awards	Single By a Vocal Collaboration - "Knee Deep" (feat. Jimmy Buffett)	Nominated	
2011	American Country Awards	Music Video by a Duo/Group/Collaboration - "As She's Walking Away" (feat. Alan Jackson)	Nominated	
2012	ACM Awards	Vocal Group of the Year	Won	
2012	CMA Awards	Vocal Group of the Year	Nominated	
2012	CMA Awards	Musical Event of the Year - "Dixie Highway" (Alan Jackson feat. Zac Brown Band)	Nominated	
2013	ACM Awards	Vocal Group of the Year	Nominated	
2013	ACM Awards	Music Video of the Year - "The Wind"	Nominated	
2013	CMT Awards	Group Video of the Year	Nominated	
2014	ACM Awards	Vocal Group of the Year	Nominated	
2014	CMT Awards	Group Video of the Year - "Sweet Annie"	Nominated	
2014	CMA Awards	Vocal Group of the Year	Nominated	
2015	People's Choice Awards	Favorite Country Group	Nominated	
2015	ACM Awards	Vocal Group of the Year	Nominated	
2015	CMT Awards	Group Video of the Year - "All Alright"	Nominated	
2015	CMA Awards	Vocal Group of the Year	Nominated	
2015	American Music Awards	Favorite Country Duo or Group	Nominated	
2016	People's Choice Awards	Favorite Country Group	Nominated	
2016	iHeartRadio Music Awards	Best Duo/Group of the Year	Nominated	
2016	iHeartRadio Music Awards	Rock Song of the Year - "Heavy is the Head" (feat. Chris Cornell)	Won	
2016	iHeartRadio Music Awards	Country Song of the Year - "Homegrown"	Nominated	
2016	American Music Awards	Favorite Duo or Group – Country	Nominated	
2017	People's Choice Awards	Favorite Country Group	Nominated	
2017	CMA Awards	Vocal Group of the Year	Nominated	
2019	CMT Music Awards	Group Video of the Year - "Someone I Used to Know"	Won	
2019	CMT Music Awards	CMT Video of the Year - "Someone I Used to Know"	Nominated	
2019	CMT Music Awards	CMT Performance of the Year - "Keep Me In Mind (From CMT Crossroads) with Shawn Mendes	Nominated	

=== Grammy Awards ===
Year	Nominee/work	Category	Result	Ref.
2010	Zac Brown Band	Best New Artist	Won	
2010	The Foundation	Best Country Album	Nominated	
2010	"Chicken Fried"	Best Country Performance by a Duo or Group with Vocals	Nominated	
2011	"Free"	Best Country Performance by a Duo or Group with Vocals	Nominated	
2011	"Free"	Best Country Song	Nominated	
2011	"As She's Walking Away" (featuring Alan Jackson)	Best Country Collaboration with Vocals	Won	
2011	You Get What You Give	Best Country Album	Nominated	
2013	Uncaged	Best Country Album	Won	
2018	"My Old Man"	Best Country Duo/Group Performance	Nominated	
2027	"Butterfly" (featuring Dolly Parton)	Best Country Duo/Group Performance	Pending	

== Other sources ==
- Zac Brown, Havighurst, Craig. Acoustic Guitar 20.10 (April 2010): 58–61. International Index to Music Periodicals Full Text
- Zac Brown Band and the art of the cover song at Jazz Aspen Labor Day fest

Awards and achievements
Preceded by Adele	Grammy Award for Best New Artist; 2010	Succeeded by Esperanza Spalding
Preceded by Alabama Shakes	Saturday Night Live musical guest March 7, 2015	Succeeded by George Ezra
