= Caroline Jones =

American singer-songwriter (born 1990)

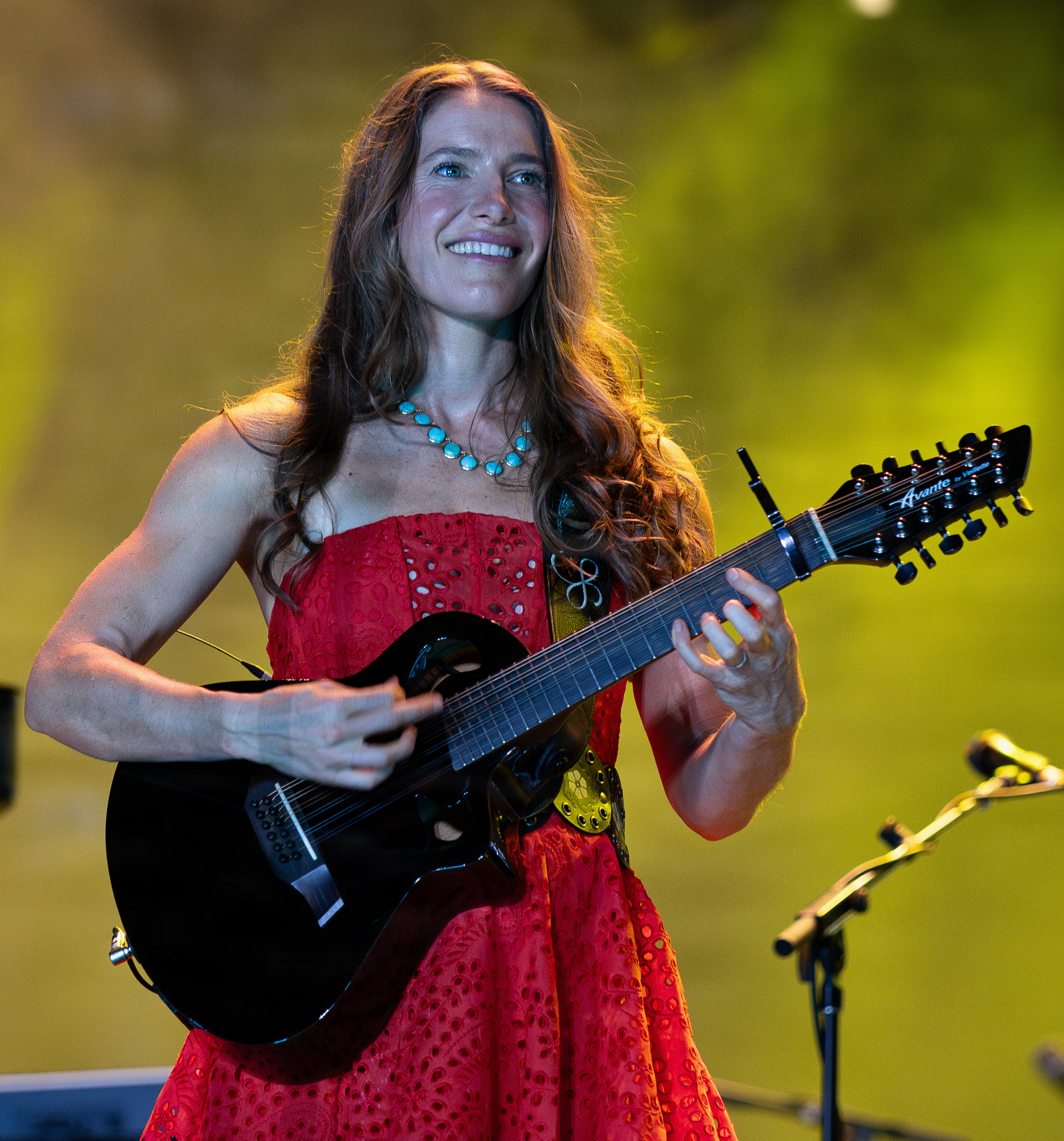
- Jones in 2026

Background information
- Born: June 30, 1990 (age 36); New York City, U.S.
- Origin: Greenwich, Connecticut, U.S.
- Genres: Country
- Occupations: Singer; songwriter
- Instruments: Vocals; guitar; piano; banjo; dobro; harmonica; sitar
- Years active: 2010–present
- Labels: Nashville Harbor; True to the Song; Mailboat Records
- Member of: Zac Brown Band
- Website: www.carolinejones.com

Caroline Jones (born June 30, 1990) is an American country music singer, songwriter, multi-instrumentalist, and radio host. Jones has released a number of albums, the most successful one being Bare Feet released in 2018. She became an official member of the Zac Brown Band in 2022.

== Early life and education ==
Caroline Jones was born in New York City to Sonia and Paul Tudor Jones, and raised in Greenwich, Connecticut. She attended the Professional Children's School in New York City and later New York University where she studied creative writing. She took singing lessons when she was nine, and wrote her first song when she was ten. She learned to sing opera and jazz under Andy Anselmo, and she also learned how to play various instruments including piano, guitar, banjo, mandolin, harmonica, and Dobro. She was for some time more interested in pop, rock and R&B music until she visited Nashville when she was 16 or 17, and switched her interest to country music.

== Career ==
In 2010, Jones launched The Heart is Smart initiative, which included performing in schools and colleges and providing music workshop for students. She also wrote and produced her debut album herself in New York City and Nashville in 2010, playing multiple instruments on the album. In January 2011, Jones self-released the album, Fallen Flower. She quickly followed with three albums the following year. In 2013, Jones became the host of Art & Soul, a radio show on SiriusXM's Coffee House interviewing musicians on their music and songwriting.

In 2017, she opened for Zac Brown Band and in 2018 for Jimmy Buffett. Through Buffett, she became signed to his Mailboat Records, and she also collaborated with Buffett on a song.

Jones was listed as one of the 10 need-to-know new country artists by Rolling Stone in 2017, and one of 15 country artists to watch by Billboard in 2018. Jones released Bare Feet in March 2018. Jones wrote all the songs in the album, which was produced by Ric Wake. In 2019, she was listed among the 40 Under 40 List put out by Connecticut Magazine.

Jones' single, "Chasin' Me", entered the Mediabase country chart at number 50 for the week ending June 1, 2019.

In 2021, she released the album Antipodes. In 2022, she joined Zac Brown Band as a member of the band. She had previously opened for the band on a number of tours since 2017, as well as appearing as a guest performer in other tours. In October 2023, she released her third major solo album, Homesite.

In 2025, Jones signed with Nashville Harbor Records & Entertainment and released "No Tellin'" as her first single under the label. On February 13, 2026, Jones released her fourth major solo album, Good Omen.

== Discography ==
=== Studio albums ===
Title	Album details	Peak chart positions				Sales
Title	Album details	US Sales	US Country Sales	US Heat	US Indie	Sales
Fallen Flower	Release date: January 12, 2011; Label: Self-released; Formats: CD, digital download	—	—	—	—	
Nice to Know You	Release date: January 31, 2012; Label: Self-released; Formats: CD, digital download	—	—	—	—	
Clean Dirt	Release date: March 25, 2012; Label: Self-released; Formats: CD, digital download	—	—	—	—	
The Heart Is Smart	Release date: September 28, 2012; Label: Self-released; Formats: CD, digital download	—	—	—	—	
Bare Feet	Release date: March 30, 2018; Label: True to the Song, Mailboat; Formats: CD, digital download, streaming	57	11	2	14	US: 39,400
Antipodes	Release date: November 12, 2021; Label: True to the Song; Format: CD, digital download, streaming	—	—	—	—	
Homesite	Release date: October 20, 2023; Label: True to the Song; Format: Digital download, streaming	—	—	—	—	
Good Omen	Release date: February 13, 2026; Label: Nashville Harbor; Format: CD, digital download, streaming	—	—	—	—	
"—" denotes a release that did not chart.

=== Extended plays ===
Title	EP details	Peak chart positions	
Title	EP details	US Heat	US Indie
Chasin' Me	Release date: October 18, 2019; Label: True to the Song, Mailboat; Formats: CD, digital download, streaming	19	45

=== Singles ===
Year	Single	Peak chart positions	Album
Year	Single	US Country Airplay	Album
2017	"Tough Guys"	—	Bare Feet
2018	"Bare Feet"	—	Bare Feet
2019	"Chasin' Me"	51	Chasin' Me
2020	"All of the Boys"	55	Chasin' Me
2021	"Come In (But Don't Make Yourself Comfortable)"	43	Antipodes
2023	"Million Little Bandaids" (featuring Zac Brown Band)	—	Homesite
2025	"No Tellin'"	48	Good Omen
2026	"You're It for Me, Honey"	54	Good Omen
"—" denotes releases that did not chart

=== Music videos ===
Year	Video
2016	"Tough Guys"
2017	"Rise"
2017	"Bare Feet"
2017	"Country Girl"
2019	"Chasin' Me"
2019	"The Difference (GoshDamn)"
2019	"Gulf Coast Girl"
2020	"All of the Boys"
2021	"Come In (But Don't Make Yourself Comfortable)"

== Tours ==
Supporting

- Welcome Home Tour (for Zac Brown Band) (2017)
- Down the Rabbit Hole Live (for Zac Brown Band) (2018)
- The Owl Tour (for Zac Brown Band) (2019)

== Awards and nominations ==
Year	Association	Category	Nominated work	Result	Ref.
2026	Academy of Country Music Awards	New Female Artist of the Year	Herself	Nominated	
