= Niko Moon =

American singer-songwriter (born 1982)

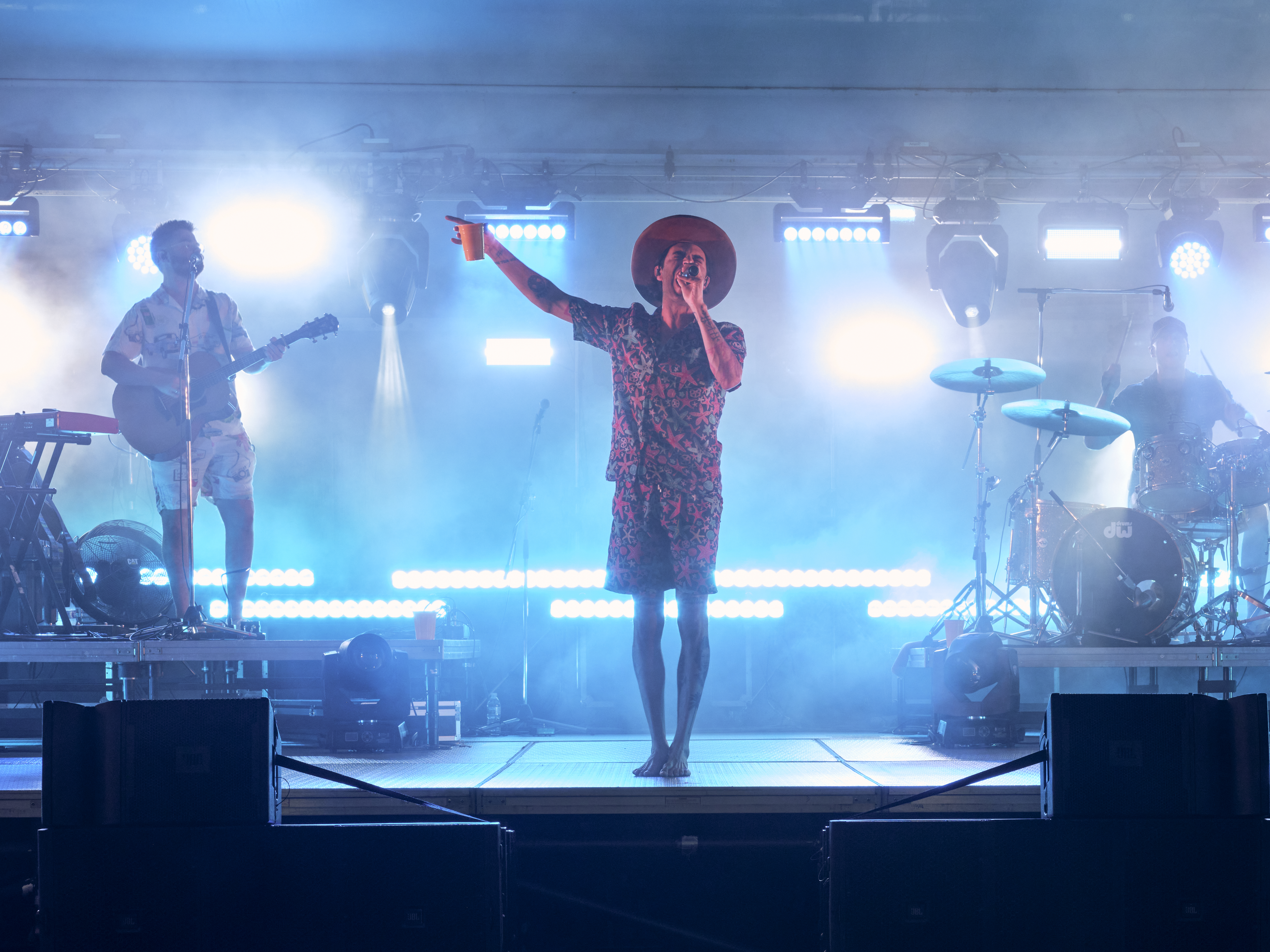
- Moon performing in 2024

Background information
- Also known as: Nic Cowan
- Born: Nicholas Cowan; September 20, 1982 (age 43); Tyler, Texas, U.S.
- Genres: Country pop
- Occupations: Singer, songwriter
- Instruments: Vocals, guitar
- Years active: 2008–present
- Label: RCA Nashville
- Formerly of: Sir Rosevelt
- Website: www.nikomoon.com

Niko Moon (born Nicholas Cowan; September 20, 1982) is an American country pop singer and songwriter formerly signed to RCA Nashville. He has written songs for Dierks Bentley, Zac Brown Band, Rascal Flatts, and Morgan Wallen. He was also a member of the group Sir Rosevelt with Zac Brown and Ben Simonetti.

== Background ==
Nicholas Cowan is originally from Tyler, Texas, but relocated to Douglasville, Georgia, when he was 10. His father, a truck driver, and his mother, a waitress, introduced Niko to the works of artists like John Prine and Patty Griffin. He started out as a drummer after seeing his father play. His father was also a musician and gave up being a touring drummer when Niko was born.

== Career ==
Niko Moon first found success as a co-writer on songs for the Zac Brown Band, including “Heavy Is the Head,” “Homegrown,” “Beautiful Drug," and "Loving You Easy,” as well as "Keep Me in Mind" and "Island Song" credited as Nic Cowan. He also co-produced the Zac Brown Band albums Jekyll + Hyde and Welcome Home, and co-wrote the song “Back To Life” for Rascal Flatts along with Cary Barlowe, Shay Mooney, and Fred Wilhelm. He appeared on Colt Ford’s album Every Chance I Get on the track "Waste Some Time" with Nappy Roots.

In 2010, under the name Nic Cowan, Niko Moon self-released his debut EP titled "Cheap Wine," which featured seven tracks. The following year saw the release of his first full-length album, "Hard Headed," also under the Nic Cowan moniker. According to Moon, the album's title track, "Hard Headed," delves into themes of resisting control from a romantic partner. Distributed by Southern Ground Records, the album includes 13 tracks, among them notable songs such as "Reno," "New Sh*t," and "Cut it Loose (feat. Zac Brown)."

In 2016, Moon formed the group Sir Rosevelt with Zac Brown and Ben Simonetti, another co-writer with the Zac Brown Band. The group's track "The Bravest" was used during the 2018 FIFA World Cup. Moon and Simonetti co-wrote a song on Michael Franti’s album Stay Human Vol. II.

In 2019, Niko Moon signed a recording contract with Sony Music Nashville imprint RCA Nashville.

== Personal life ==
Niko is married to singer-songwriter Anna Moon. They have a daughter, Lily Ann Moon and a son, Bodi.

== Discography ==
=== Studio albums ===
Title	Album details	Peak chart positions	
Title	Album details	US	US Country
Good Time	Release date: August 27, 2021; Label: RCA Nashville	139	12
Better Days	Release date: January 19, 2024; Label: Happy Cowboy Records	—	—
American Palm	Release date: July 18, 2025; Label: Empire	—	—
ROOTS	Release date: July 17, 2026	-	

=== EPs ===
Title	EP details	Peak chart positions		Sales
Title	EP details	US	US Country	Sales
Good Time	Release date: February 14, 2020; Label: RCA Nashville	191	19	US: 200
Coastin'	Released: June 10, 2022; Label: RCA Nashville	—	—	
"—" denotes releases that did not chart

=== Singles ===
Year	Single	Peak chart positions					Certifications	Album
Year	Single	US	US Country	US Country Airplay	CAN	CAN Country	Certifications	Album
2020	"Good Time"	20	1	1	74	10	RIAA: 3× Platinum; MC: 2× Platinum	Good Time
2021	"No Sad Songs"	—	—	49	—	—		Good Time
2021	"Paradise to Me"	—	—	43	—	—	MC: Gold	Good Time
2022	"Easy Tonight"	—	—	57	—	—		Coastin'
"—" denotes releases that did not chart

=== Music videos ===
Title	Year	Director
"Good Time"	2020	Niko Moon
