= Coy Bowles =

Zac Brown Band member

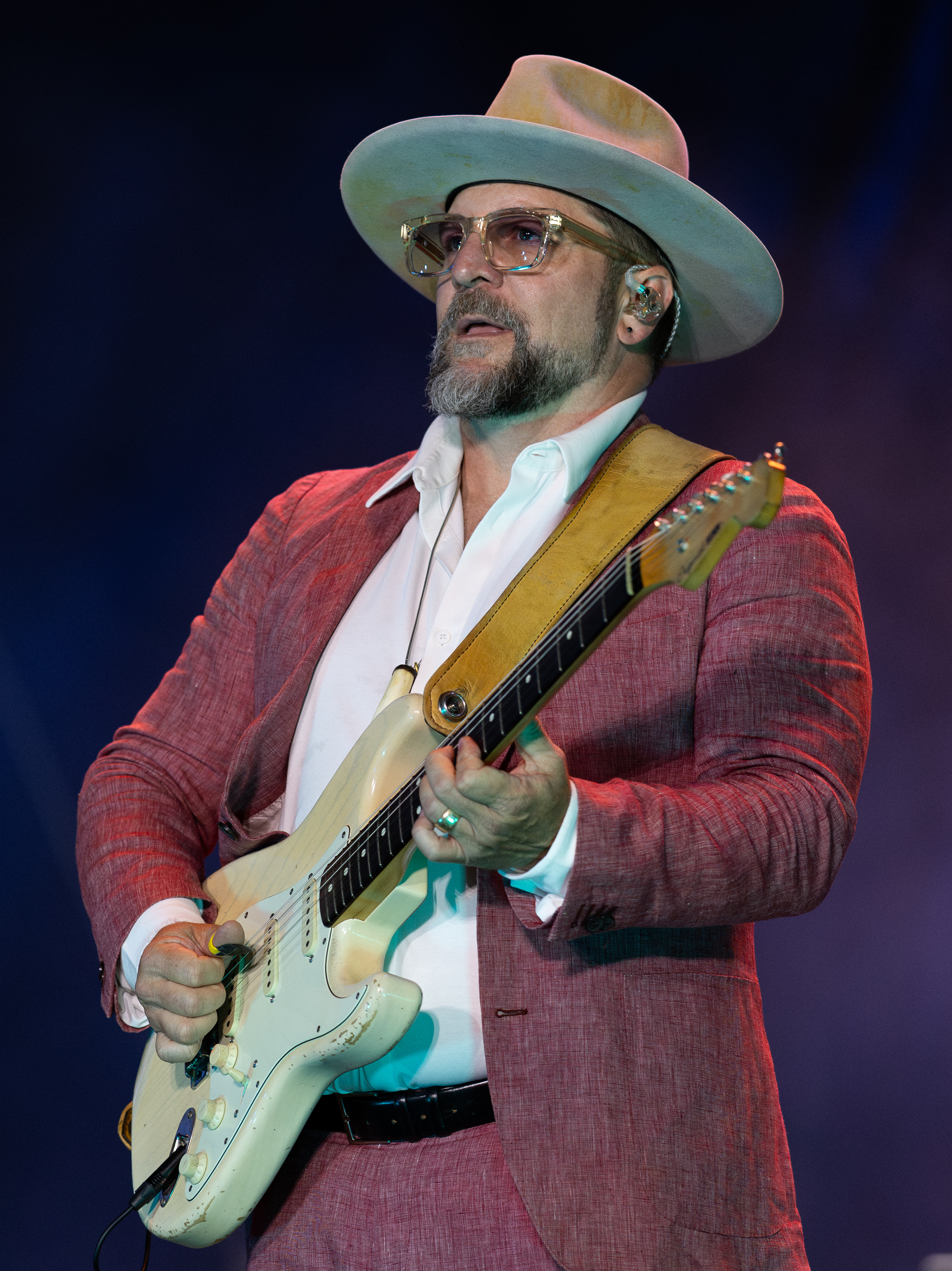
Bowles with the Zac Brown Band in 2026

Coy Lamar Bowles is an American musician best known as a member of Zac Brown Band, which won three Emmy awards. He plays guitar, slide guitar, dobro, piano and organ. He joined the Zac Brown Band in 2007, where he also has contributed as a songwriter.

He has writing credits on the albums You Get What You Give, Uncaged and Jekyll + Hyde, including three No. 1 hit songs – "Knee Deep", "Colder Weather" and "Sweet Annie".

== Early life ==
Bowles was born and grew up in Thomaston, Georgia, in the central Piedmont area. He started playing guitar at age 11. By the time he was 13, he had a band called Betty Doom that played punk rock and rock-n-roll music at local churches and birthday parties. He attended public school.

Bowles went to college for biology at West Georgia College, where he met Zac Brown. Just before graduation, he decided that instead of biology, he wanted to pursue a career in music. He took a year off and practiced eight hours a day in order to get into Georgia State University's School of Music, where he was admitted to the Jazz Studies Program. Throughout his time in this program, he also played in the Atlanta area with various jazz and blues acts.

Upon graduating, he started his own band, Coy Bowles and The Fellowship. He opened for the Zac Brown Band at the Sky Bar in Auburn, Alabama. A week or two later, Bowles was asked to join the band.

== Children's books ==
In addition to making music, Bowles has written children's books. He focuses on today's issues, hoping to give children, parents and teachers a common ground for dealing with them.

In 2012, Bowles wrote and published his debut children's book "Amy Giggles, Laugh Out Loud". It is about accepting who you are and realizing that personal differences make individuals beautiful and unique. In 2016, he published Will Powers: Where There's a Will There's a Way, a story about overcoming self-entitlement and achieving goals by dedication and a strong work ethic. He followed this with "When You're Feeling Sick" (2017), giving encouraging, silly advice on how to face sick days with courage and a positive attitude.

== Coy Bowles and The Fellowship ==
Coy Bowles and The Fellowship is a band that fuses the roots of blues with jazz and elements of gospel, country and rock. According to Bowles, the idea behind The Fellowship is to have a group of musicians playing together under one common goal – to play your heart out and get down with the get down. When Bowles began writing music, he arranged the tunes in a way so that the listener could appreciate the songs for the melody and lyrics, but still have sections where the music was highly improvisational. He wanted the music he composed to possess a distinct and original sound, while still giving a nod to his musical heroes. In 2006, Coy Bowles and the Fellowship released their first album Into the Distance, the year before he joined Zac Brown Band. Coy Bowles and the Fellowship continue to play in the Atlanta area when he is not on the road with Zac Brown Band.
