= John Driskell Hopkins =

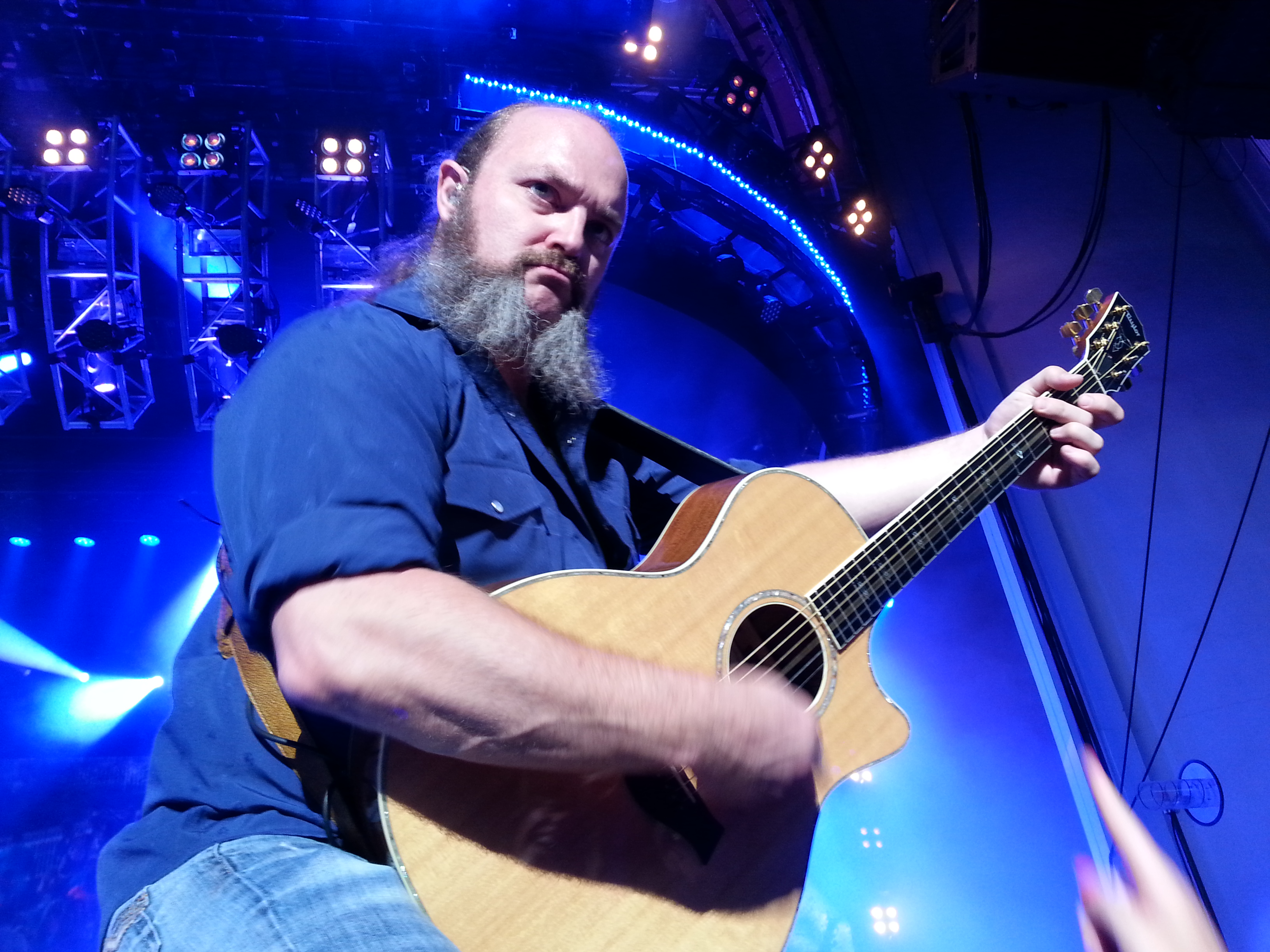
- Hopkins in 2014.

Background information
- Born: May 3, 1971 (age 55); San Antonio, Texas, United States
- Genres: Americana; country; country rock; bluegrass; rock and roll
- Instruments: Guitar; ukulele; bass; stand-up bass; banjo
- Years active: 1992–present
- Member of: Zac Brown Band
- Website: johndriskellhopkins.com

John Driskell Hopkins (born May 3, 1971) is an American musician best known for his role as a founding member, vocalist, multi-instrumentalist, and songwriter for the Grammy Award-winning group Zac Brown Band. Hopkins co-wrote, with Zac Brown, Wyatt Durette, and Shawn Mullins, the Zac Brown Band's third single, "Toes", from their 2008 major-label debut The Foundation. It was the second number-one single for the band. Hopkins also co-wrote, with Zac Brown, Wyatt Durette, and Sonia Leigh, the second single from the band's third major-label album Uncaged, entitled "Goodbye in Her Eyes". Hopkins co-wrote the band's first number-one hit on the Billboard Mainstream Rock chart, "Heavy Is the Head", which featured Chris Cornell and was the second single from their fourth major-label studio album, 2015's Jekyll + Hyde.

== Early life ==
Hopkins was raised in Gainesville, Georgia, the eldest of four brothers. He graduated from Florida State University 1993 with a degree in general theatre. During college at Florida State University, Hopkins was the front man of a band called The Woodpeckers.

== Career ==
After college, Hopkins moved to Atlanta. In 1996, he formed his rock band Brighter Shade, with whom he still plays. Brighter Shade recorded two albums by the early 2000s. During that time, Hopkins got involved with the production end of the scene: producing, recording, and collaborating on several projects in the Atlanta area, including one with Zac Brown. After several years of friendship with Brown, in 2005, Hopkins joined the Zac Brown Band on bass guitar and vocals. In 2011, Hopkins joined forces with bluegrass band Balsam Range. In January 2013, they released their debut CD called Daylight to critical acclaim.

In 2019, Hopkins, along with fellow musicians Greg Lee, Mike Rizzi, Mark Dannells, and Mick Murphy, formed a heavy rock band, The Bloody Wolves of Venice. The Bloody Wolves of Venice released a five-song EP, The Revelation EP, which was featured in the 2018 film Adolescence.

=== Collaborations ===
Hopkins heard Balsam Range on bluegrass radio in 2011 and was so impressed, he immediately bought all their music. They later met and made an immediate personal and musical connection. They decided to join forces and record a CD. In September 2012, the album Daylight was completed, and officially released January 2013.

If you drew line graphs plotting the changes each song brings to a CD – tempo, subject, mood … – some CDs would flatline and the majority would show moderate spikes up and down. Daylight's graph would look like the EKG of a person on speed, and every song is a good one. I hope Hopkins is already planning his next CD.

Balsam Range is a five-piece bluegrass powerhouse from Haywood County, North Carolina, and include members Buddy Melton (fiddle, vocals), Darren Nicholson (mandolin, vocals), Marc Pruett (banjo), Caleb Smith (guitar, vocals), and Tim Surrett (bass, dobro, vocals). Their accolades include being voted Best Old-Time/Bluegrass Band of 2012 in Asheville's Mountain Xpress and receiving the IBMA Song of the Year award for "Trains I Missed 2011" and the 2013 IBMA "Album of the Year" award for Papertown, and the 2014 IBMA "Entertainer of the Year". Hopkins and Balsam Range continue to play shows together often.

Dobro master and 14-time Grammy winner Jerry Douglas was also featured on Hopkins' 2013 release, Daylight.

In 2014, Hopkins has also collaborated with Georgia native bluegrass group the "Dappled Grays" on several shows, including two sold-out nights at the Georgia Theater opening for The String Cheese Incident.

=== Brighter Shade ===
Hopkins formed aggressive songwriter band Brighter Shade in 1996. The original line-up consisted of Hopkins on vocals and guitar, Andy Birdsall on vocals and guitar, Sean McIntyre on bass, and Marcus Petruska on drums. They recorded their eponymous debut album in 1996.

Later, a second line-up followed, featuring Hopkins and Birsdall, but added Wilder Embry on bass, Damian Cartier on keyboards, and John Woodward and Eric Sanders on drums. They recorded Brighter Shade's sophomore album, Divine Ignorance, in 2001. Brighter Shade still plays periodic gigs in and around the Atlanta area.

Hopkins' recording studio, Brighter Shade Studios, shares the name of his band, and was where the Zac Brown album Home Grown was recorded in 1998. Brighter Shade Studios was also used in the recording of first two major albums of the Zac Brown Band - The Foundation and You Get What You Give.

=== Acting career ===
Hopkins graduated from Florida State University in 1993 with a degree in general theatre. His first film, Careful What You Wish For, starring Nick Jonas, Isabel Lucas, and Paul Sorvino, was released in May 2015. Hopkins also had a role in the 2018 film Adolescence. Hopkins has a role in the upcoming crime drama, Breakwater, expected to be released later this year.

== Personal life ==
In December 2021, Hopkins was diagnosed with amyotrophic lateral sclerosis (ALS or Lou Gehrig's disease). He did not publicly announce this diagnosis until May 20, 2022, when the rest of the Zac Brown Band and he publicly announced this during a YouTube video. In response, Hopkins founded the 501c3 Hop On A Cure to fund research on the disease.

== Discography ==
- Brighter Shade

Brighter Shade (1996)

- Divine Ignorance

Brighter Shade (2001)

- Daylight

John Driskell Hopkins and Balsam Range (2012)

- In The Spirit: A Celebration of the Holidays

John Driskell Hopkins and The Atlanta Pops Orchestra (2015)

- You Better Watch Out!

The Joe Gransden Big Band (2017)

- The Revelation

Bloody Wolves of Venice (2019)

- Lonesome High

John Driskell Hopkins (2021)

- Let's Get Frosty

John Driskell Hopkins with Yacht Rock Revue
