= Daniel de los Reyes =

American drummer

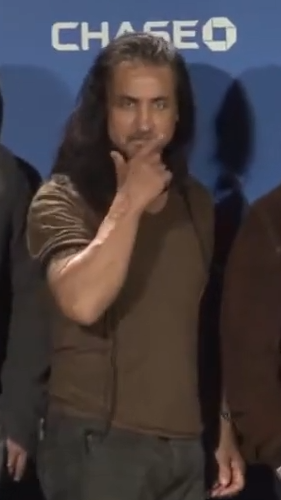
- Reyes with Zac Brown Band in 2014

Background information
- Born: July 18, 1962 (age 64); New York City, New York, U.S.
- Origin: Fayetteville, Georgia
- Occupation: Percussionist
- Years active: 1990–present
- Website: Official website

Daniel de los Reyes (born July 18, 1962) is an American percussionist who is a former member of Earth, Wind & Fire and Chicago. He is currently a member of the Zac Brown Band. He is the oldest member of the band.

== Musical career ==
De los Reyes was born in New York City and raised in Puerto Rico and Las Vegas. He is of Cuban and Puerto Rican descent. He received early drum instruction from his father, Walfredo Reyes, Sr. His grandfather, Walfredo de los Reyes II, was one of the founding members of the Cuban orchestra Casino de la Playa. He is also an alumnus of Valley High School in the Las Vegas town of Winchester.

De los Reyes's first work as a drummer was for actor and singer Ben Vereen. In 1997, he played on Steve Winwood's album Junction Seven and Yanni's live recording Tribute; performed with Ricky Martin at the 1999 and 2000 Grammy Awards; and played on Philip Bailey's 2002 LP Soul on Jazz. He appeared on Earth, Wind & Fire's album The Promise (2003), on Devoted Spirits: A Tribute to Earth Wind and Fire (2004), and on the Jimi Hendrix tribute album Power of Soul (2004).

He appeared at a 2004 benefit show in honour of late Billboard magazine editor Timothy White, where he performed alongside Don Henley, Sting, Billy Joel, Jimmy Buffett, Roger Waters, Sheryl Crow, James Taylor, Brian Wilson and Jennifer Lopez. Reyes was featured on Peter Frampton's LP Fingerprints (2006), The Killers album Day & Age (2008), and Brandon Flowers's debut album Flamingo (2010).

He became a member of country music group the Zac Brown Band in 2012, with whom he was nominated for two Grammy Awards, winning one. He appeared as a guest on Chicago's 2018 tour.

=== Other acts ===
De los Reyes has appeared with artists including Justo Almario, Gabriela Anders, India.Arie, Lindsey Buckingham, Vikki Carr, Cher and Sheena Easton, Gloria Estefan, Lola Falana, David Foster, Aretha Franklin, Josh Groban, Faith Hill, Chris Isaak, Patti LaBelle, Ronnie Laws, John Mayer, Tim McGraw, Sérgio Mendes, Wayne Newton Stevie Nicks and Don Omar, Donny Osmond, Diana Ross, Lionel Richie José Luis Rodríguez, Jon Secada, Shakira and Donna Summer.

His entertainment company, DrumJungle, Inc., produces the "Rhythm Evolution!" show. He is the inventor of the "Practice Pro Pad" and LP "One Shot Shaker" musical devices.

== Personal life ==
De los Reyes currently resides in Fayetteville, GA. He is the older brother of actor Kamar de los Reyes and younger brother to drummer Walfredo Reyes Jr.

== Television appearances ==
- Grammy Awards with Don Omar (2005)
- Urban Latino with Walfredo Reyes, Jr. and Kamar de los Reyes (April 2004)
- 2004 Grammy Awards with Earth, Wind & Fire
- The Way She Moves - VH1 original movie (2001)
- Saturday Night Live with Don Henley
- Bette with Bette Midler (November 2000)
- A & E Live Inside Job with Don Henley (2000)
- Saturday Night Live with Jennifer Lopez (2000)
- 1999 Women's World Cup with Jennifer Lopez
- American Music Awards with Kenny Ortega
- American Music Awards with Gloria Estefan and Miami Sound Machine
- American Music Awards with Diana Ross
- American Music Awards with Lionel Richie
- Rick Dees with Gerardo
- Amigos Adelante—Budweiser
- Steve Winwood -- "Don't You Know What the Night Can Do?" (Adrien Lyons)
- One Life to Live

== Videography ==
- Inside Job with Don Henley
- Feelin' So Good with Jennifer Lopez
- The Ricky Martin Video Collection with Ricky Martin
- Tribute with Yanni
- Yanni Live at Royal Albert Hall with Yanni
- Yanni, Live from Toji Temple with Yanni
- Cuando Pasara with Rob Rosa
- We All Sleep Alone with Cher

== Discography ==
(2001) San Rafael 500
