= Zac Brown =

American singer (born 1978)

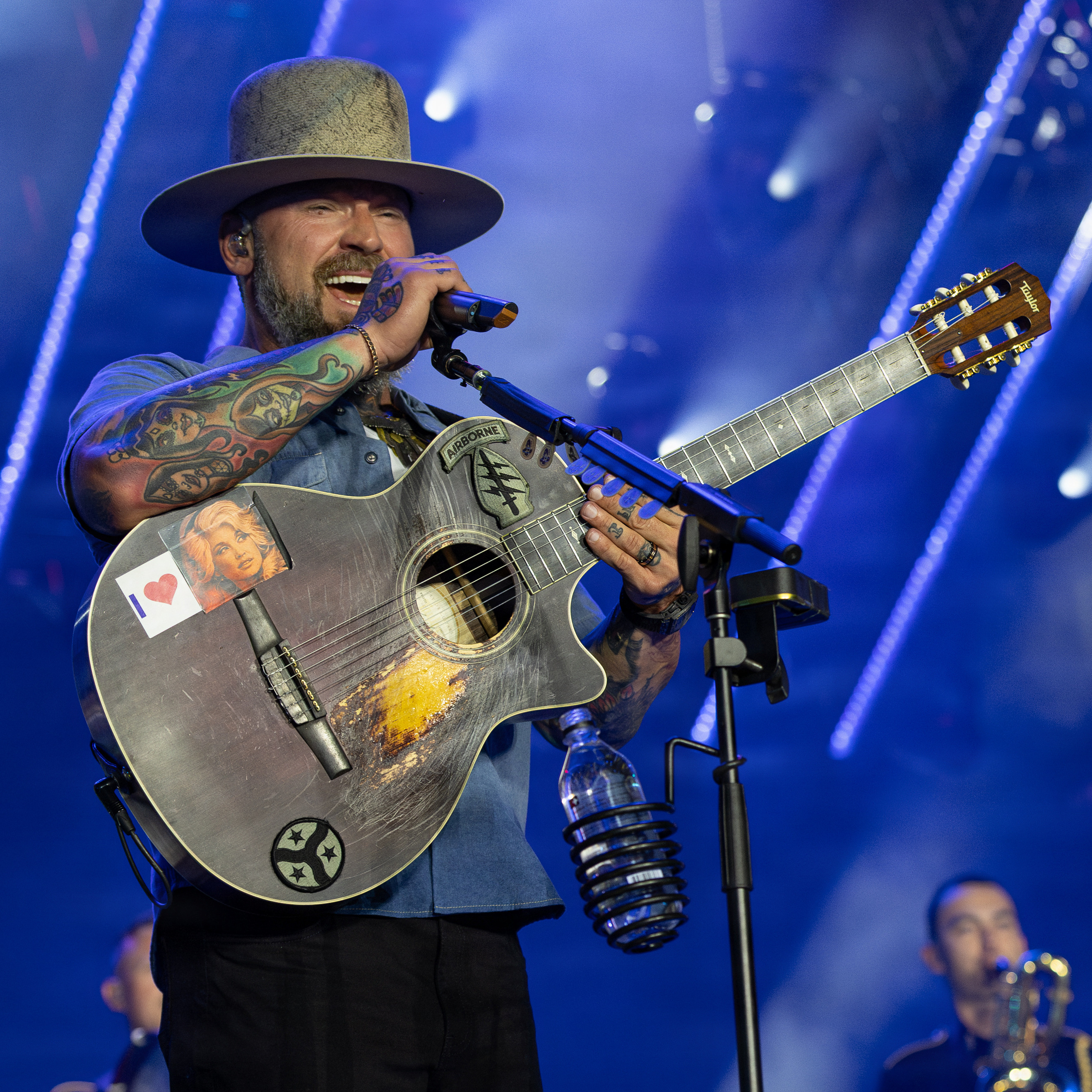
- Brown performing in 2026

Background information
- Born: Zachry Alexander Brown; July 31, 1978 (age 48); Atlanta, Georgia, U.S.
- Genres: Country; pop; country pop; country rock; EDM; folk rock; Southern rock; reggae
- Occupations: Singer; songwriter; musician
- Instruments: Vocals; guitar; banjo
- Years active: 2002–present
- Label: Southern Ground
- Member of: Zac Brown Band
- Formerly of: Sir Rosevelt
- Spouses: Shelly Brown (m. 2006; div. 2018) Kelly Yazdi (m. 2023; sep. 2023) Kendra Scott (m. 2026)
- Website: zacbrown.com

Zachry Alexander Brown (born July 31, 1978) is an American singer, songwriter, and musician. He is the co-founder and lead singer of the country Zac Brown Band, as well as electronic dance music group Sir Rosevelt. In 2019, Brown released a pop surprise album titled The Controversy.

== Early life ==
Brown was raised on Lake Lanier, Georgia by his mother, Beyette, and stepfather Dr. Jody Moses, a dentist in Cumming, Georgia. The eleventh of twelve children, Brown attended Mashburn Elementary School, South Forsyth Middle School, and South Forsyth High School in Cumming. After a year of high school, he moved to Dahlonega, Georgia where he graduated from Lumpkin County High School. Brown was given his mother's guitar at age 8, and one of his stepfather's patients was enlisted to teach him classical guitar. He completed two years of lessons, but soon after developed a love for bluegrass music while playing with his father and brother on weekend visits. In his mid-teens, Brown spent almost a year being tutored by a vocal coach from his church.

While still in high school, with James Taylor as his inspiration, Brown began playing solo gigs in local venues, performing as a rock band and country and pop cover songs. Brown attended the University of West Georgia, where he became a member of the Zeta Kappa chapter of the Kappa Alpha Order fraternity. He was also a camp counselor at Episcopal Camp Mikell in Toccoa, Georgia, and Camp Glisson, a United Methodist summer camp and retreat center located in Dahlonega. Brown later founded Camp Southern Ground, a 501c3 nonprofit camp in Fayetteville, Georgia.

== Other ventures ==
In 2012, Brown purchased Masterlink Studio (formerly Young 'Un Sound and Monument Recording Studios) in Nashville's Music Row and completely overhauled it to create Southern Ground Nashville, a recording studio for artists on Brown's Southern Ground record label.

In 2017, Brown made an investment into the Stillhouse Creek Distillery in Lumpkin County, Georgia, which was later rebranded the Z. Brown Distillery. The distillery closed down on November 18, 2018.

Brown appeared in a 2016 episode of Treehouse Masters on Animal Planet. In 2019, Brown appeared on the Lil Dicky charity single "Earth". Brown appeared as part of a reward challenge on Survivor for season 50 in 2026.

Brown founded Southern Grind Knives, a knife company based out of Peachtree City, Georgia. The company specializes in hard-use tactical knives.

== Personal life ==
In 2016, Brown was involved in an early morning drug bust at the Four Seasons Hotels and Resorts in Palm Beach, Florida. Although Brown was not arrested, police arrested four other individuals for marijuana and cocaine, and found Brown in possession of prescription pills. Reports stated that there were three strippers in the room at the time of the arrests. Reports also state that the Palm Beach Police Officers did not name Brown in their report because they were fans of his music. Brown later apologized saying that he was, "at the wrong place at the wrong time."

In 2018, Brown and his wife Shelly ended their 12-year marriage. They have four daughters and a son.

In August 2023, Brown married the model and actress Kelly Yazdi. In December of the same year, they separated and announced their intention to divorce.

Brown began dating jewelry designer Kendra Scott several months prior to their red carpet debut at the American Music Awards in May 2025. On July 24, he announced their engagement, with the couple sharing the news exclusively through People magazine. They were married on May 25, 2026 in a ceremony in Greece.

== Discography ==
- The Controversy (2019)

=== Album appearances ===
Year	Title	Artist	Album
2009	"Trying To Drive"	Aslyn	The Dandelion Sessions
2009	"Smoke Rise"	Clay Cook	On Mountain Time
2010	"We Are the World 25 for Haiti"	Artists for Haiti	Non-album single
2010	"Flyin' High"	Kid Rock	Born Free
2011	"Where the River Goes"	—N/a	Footloose: Music from the Motion Picture
2011	"Cut It Loose"	Nic Cowan	Hard Headed
2011	"Roamin'"	Sonia Leigh	1978 December
2012	"Dixie Highway"	Alan Jackson	Thirty Miles West
2012	"I Will Lay Me Down"	John Driskell Hopkins, Balsam Range	Daylight
2013	"Homesick"	Sheryl Crow	Feels like Home
2014	"Congregation"	Foo Fighters	Sonic Highways
2015	"Broken Arrows"	Avicii	Stories
2016	"Grandma's Garden"	—N/a	Southern Family
2017	"Leader of the Band"	—N/a	A Tribute to Dan Fogelberg
2017	"Everybody Wants to Go to Heaven"	Kenny Chesney	Live in No Shoes Nation
2020	"Can You Hear Me Now - Remix"	Bear and a Banjo	Bear and a Banjo
2020	"Hometown"	Diplo, Danielle Bradbery	Diplo Presents Thomas Wesley, Chapter 1: Snake Oil
2020	"Someday"	Kygo	Golden Hour
2022	"Can't Stop Us Now"	Pitbull	Trackhouse
