= 2011 in country music =

This is a list of notable events in country music that took place in the year 2011.

== Events ==
- January 1 – Shania Twain marries Swiss businessman Frédéric Thiébaud in Puerto Rico, less than two weeks after announcing the two were engaged. Also on the same day, Kellie Pickler and songwriter Kyle Jacobs marry in the Caribbean.
- January 11 – Jewel confirms to People Magazine that she and her husband, Ty Murray, are expecting their first child together. On March 11, Jewel and her unborn baby were unharmed after a collision with a firetruck near her current hometown of Stephenville, Texas. Jewel would give birth to a son, Kase Townes Murray, on July 11.
- February 15 – Glen Campbell announces that he will release his final studio album in 2011 with a farewell concert tour to follow. He also plans an acoustic-style greatest-hits album before officially retiring.
- March 18 – Billy Ray Cyrus confirms on The View that he has dropped his divorce and has begun to reconcile his family.
- March 27 – Shania Twain is inducted into the Canadian Music Hall of Fame during the Juno Awards. In a backstage interview, Twain confirms she is recording new music and preparing to go back on tour.
- April 19 – CMT and several other news sources confirm that actor Jeff Bridges has signed a recording contract with jazz music label Blue Note Records. He will collaborate with producer T-Bone Burnett and would release his debut album in 2011. Bridges previously won an Oscar for his portrayal of a country music singer-songwriter.
- May 14 – Blake Shelton and Miranda Lambert are married at Don Strange Ranch in Boerne, Texas, after five years of dating.
- May 23 – John Rich is selected as the winner of the fourth season of the Celebrity Apprentice over actress Marlee Matlin.
- May 25 – Scotty McCreery wins the tenth-season competition of American Idol, becoming the second country music-focused artist (behind Carrie Underwood) to win. Runner-up Lauren Alaina is also rooted in country music. Days later, both sign lucrative contracts with Mercury Nashville Records.
- June 4 – A house fire destroys the home of Trace Adkins and his family; his three youngest daughters and a dog, who were home when the fire started, escape safely.
- June 22 – Glen Campbell announces that he has Alzheimer's disease, having been diagnosed with the illness about six months prior. This news comes four months after Campbell announces his retirement from the music business.
- July 11 – Gloriana, a mixed quartet, announces the departure of Cheyenne Kimball. The group is reduced to a trio at this point.
- July 15 – Bill Anderson celebrates his 50th Grand Ole Opry Anniversary
- August 4 – Jimmy C. Newman celebrates his 55th Grand Ole Opry anniversary
- August 12 – Miranda Lambert quest Carrie Underwood at the Capital Hoedown in Ottawa, Canada.
- August 13 – Seven people are killed and more than 45 people are injured when an outdoor stage collapses at the Indiana State Fair due to high winds at a concert featuring Sugarland. Neither the duo nor their opening act, Sara Bareilles, were on stage at the time of the collapse.
- August 25 – George Jones Celebrates his 55th Grand Ole Opry Anniversary
- October 3 – Hank Williams Jr.'s opening theme for Monday Night Football, "All My Rowdy Friends Are Here on Monday Night", with its famous line, "Are you ready for some football?", is pulled from that night's program on ESPN, after Williams compared President Obama to Adolf Hitler on Fox & Friends. The song had been used in the show's opening broadcasts since 1989. The song would eventually return in 2017, with a remix featuring Florida Georgia Line and Jason Derulo.
- October 10 – Toby Keith releases "Red Solo Cup". The song becomes a major viral and crossover hit, with the music video acquiring more than 600,000 views on YouTube before the release of Keith's album Clancy's Tavern, and reaching #15 on the Billboard Hot 100 and #9 on the Hot Country Songs chart, as well as being covered in the Glee episode "Hold On to Sixteen" two months later.
- November 3 – Keith Urban announces that he will undergo throat surgery to remove a polyp in his vocal cords. He subsequently cancels or postpones all public appearances until 2012.
- November 29 – Taylor Swift and Kenny Chesney at the CMT Artists of the Year.

== Top hits of the year ==
The following songs placed within the Top 20 on the Hot Country Songs or Canada Country charts in 2011:

US	CAN	Single	Artist	Reference
1	1	Am I the Only One	Dierks Bentley	
18	—	Amen	Edens Edge	
1	1	Are You Gonna Kiss Me or Not	Thompson Square	
3	5	Back to December	Taylor Swift	
3	2	Baggage Claim	Miranda Lambert	
1	4	Barefoot Blue Jean Night	Jake Owen	
10	5	Bleed Red	Ronnie Dunn	
6	10	The Breath You Take	George Strait	
12	21	Bullets in the Gun	Toby Keith	
15	11	Camouflage	Brad Paisley	
1	1	Colder Weather	Zac Brown Band	
19	35	Cost of Livin'	Ronnie Dunn	
4	10	Country Girl (Shake It for Me)	Luke Bryan	
1	7	Country Must Be Country Wide	Brantley Gilbert	
1	4	Crazy Girl	Eli Young Band	
1	4	Dirt Road Anthem	Jason Aldean	
1	1	Don't You Wanna Stay	Jason Aldean with Kelly Clarkson	
3	25	Easy	Rascal Flatts featuring Natasha Bedingfield	
14	46	Family Man	Craig Campbell	
1	1	Felt Good on My Lips	Tim McGraw	
10	29	From a Table Away	Sunny Sweeney	
17	46	Georgia Clay	Josh Kelley	
1	1	God Gave Me You	Blake Shelton	
1	2	Heart Like Mine	Miranda Lambert	
6	4	Hello World	Lady Antebellum	
2	2	Here for a Good Time	George Strait	
13	34	Homeboy	Eric Church	
1	1	Honey Bee	Blake Shelton	
14	38	I Can't Love You Back	Easton Corbin	
17	43	I Got Nothin'	Darius Rucker	
8	12	I Got You	Thompson Square	
15	15	I Love You This Big	Scotty McCreery	
2	1	I Won't Let Go	Rascal Flatts	
18	—	I Wouldn't Be a Man	Josh Turner	
1	4	If Heaven Wasn't So Far Away	Justin Moore	
1	1	Just a Kiss	Lady Antebellum	
6	19	Just Fishin'	Trace Adkins	
1	1	Keep Me in Mind	Zac Brown Band	
1	1	Knee Deep	Zac Brown Band featuring Jimmy Buffett	
1	3	Let Me Down Easy	Billy Currington	
1	6	A Little Bit Stronger	Sara Evans	
11	13	Little Miss	Sugarland	
1	1	Live a Little	Kenny Chesney	
1	1	Long Hot Summer	Keith Urban	
19	40	Look It Up	Ashton Shepherd	
19	—	Love Don't Run	Steve Holy	
11	6	Love Done Gone	Billy Currington	
1	—	Made in America	Toby Keith	
2	10	Mama's Song	Carrie Underwood	
2	2	Mean	Taylor Swift	
2	13	My Kinda Party	Jason Aldean	
1	1	Old Alabama	Brad Paisley featuring Alabama	
13	26	One More Drinkin' Song	Jerrod Niemann	
2	2	Put You in a Song	Keith Urban	
1	1	Remind Me	Brad Paisley duet with Carrie Underwood	
17	39	The Shape I'm In	Joe Nichols	
16	39	Smoke a Little Smoke	Eric Church	
1	4	Someone Else Calling You Baby	Luke Bryan	
12	14	Somewhere Else	Toby Keith	
1	1	Somewhere with You	Kenny Chesney	
1	3	Sparks Fly	Taylor Swift	
1	1	Take a Back Road	Rodney Atkins	
2	1	Tattoos on This Town	Jason Aldean	
17	33	Teenage Daughters	Martina McBride	
1	4	This	Darius Rucker	
2	1	This Is Country Music	Brad Paisley	
1	13	Tomorrow	Chris Young	
1	1	Turn On the Radio	Reba	
1	6	Voices	Chris Young	
1	1	We Owned the Night	Lady Antebellum	
4	28	What Do You Want	Jerrod Niemann	
1	3	Who Are You When I'm Not Looking	Blake Shelton	
15	23	Wildflower	The JaneDear Girls	
1	2	Without You	Keith Urban	
3	5	You and Tequila	Kenny Chesney featuring Grace Potter	
2	17	You Lie	The Band Perry	

== Top new album releases ==
The following albums placed within the Top 50 on the Top Country Albums charts in 2011:

US	Album	Artist	Record label	Release date	Reference
9	American Idol Season 10	Lauren Alaina	19/Interscope	May 24	
3	American Idol Season 10	Scotty McCreery	19/Interscope	May 24	
6	American Idol Season 10: Highlights (EP)	Lauren Alaina	19/Interscope/Mercury Nashville	June 28	
2	American Idol Season 10: Highlights (EP)	Scotty McCreery	19/Interscope/Mercury Nashville	June 28	
4	Anniversary Celebration	Randy Travis	Warner Bros. Nashville	June 7	
1	Barefoot Blue Jean Night	Jake Owen	RCA Nashville	August 30	
1	Chief	Eric Church	EMI Music Nashville	July 26	
1	Clancy's Tavern	Toby Keith	Show Dog – Universal Records	October 25	
1	Clear as Day	Scotty McCreery	19/Interscope/Mercury Nashville	October 4	
7	Concrete	Sunny Sweeney	Republic Nashville	August 23	
7	Donny & Marie	Donny & Marie	MPCA	May 3	
10	Double-Wide Dream	Casey Donahew Band	Almost Country	October 25	
4	Eleven	Martina McBride	Republic Nashville	October 11	
3	Every Chance I Get	Colt Ford	Average Joe's	May 3	
4	Footloose soundtrack	Various Artists	Atlantic/Warner Bros. Nashville	September 27	
1	Four the Record	Miranda Lambert	RCA Nashville	November 1	
6	Ghost on the Canvas	Glen Campbell	Surfdog	August 30	
4	Guitar Slinger	Vince Gill	MCA Nashville	October 25	
3	Hard Bargain	Emmylou Harris	Nonesuch	April 26	
1	Hell on Heels	Pistol Annies	Columbia Nashville	August 23	
1	Here for a Good Time	George Strait	MCA Nashville	September 6	
10	Hillbilly Joker	Hank Williams III	Curb	May 17	
1	Hunter Hayes	Hunter Hayes	Atlantic Nashville	October 11	
4	I'll Never Get Out of This World Alive	Steve Earle	New West	April 26	
10	The JaneDear Girls	The JaneDear Girls	Warner Bros. Nashville	February 1	
10	Jeff Bridges	Jeff Bridges	Blue Note	August 16	
7	Lady and Gentlemen	LeAnn Rimes	Asylum-Curb	September 27	
3	Life at Best	Eli Young Band	Republic Nashville	August 16	
7	The Love of God	Kenny Rogers	Cracker Barrel	March 7	
2	Neon	Chris Young	RCA Nashville	July 12	
3	Now That's What I Call Country Volume 4	Various Artists	Universal Music	June 14	
1	Own the Night	Lady Antebellum	Capitol Nashville	September 13	
1	Outlaws Like Me	Justin Moore	Valory Music Group	June 21	
1	Paper Airplane	Alison Krauss & Union Station	Rounder	April 12	
2	Proud to Be Here	Trace Adkins	Show Dog-Universal	August 2	
9	Rebels on the Run	Montgomery Gentry	Average Joe's	October 18	
1	Red River Blue	Blake Shelton	Warner Bros. Nashville	July 12	
1	Ronnie Dunn	Ronnie Dunn	Arista Nashville	June 7	
8	The Sound of a Million Dreams	David Nail	MCA Nashville	November 15	
2	Speak Now World Tour – Live	Taylor Swift	Big Machine	November 21	
6	Spring Break 3...It's a Shore Thing (EP)	Luke Bryan	Capitol Nashville	March 1	
3	Steel Magnolia	Steel Magnolia	Big Machine	January 11	
1	Stronger	Sara Evans	RCA Nashville	March 8	
1	Tailgates & Tanlines	Luke Bryan	Capitol Nashville	August 9	
3	Take a Back Road	Rodney Atkins	Curb	October 4	
1	This Is Country Music	Brad Paisley	Arista Nashville	May 23	
3	Thompson Square	Thompson Square	Stoney Creek	February 8	
1	Town Line	Aaron Lewis	Stroudavarious	March 1	
2	Wildflower	Lauren Alaina	19/Interscope/Mercury Nashville	October 11	

=== Other top albums ===
US	Album	Artist	Record label	Release date	Reference
45	10 Great Skits	Roy D. Mercer	Capitol Nashville	April 5	
43	1978 December	Sonia Leigh	Southern Ground	September 27	
19	The Academy of Country Music Awards: 2011 ACM Spotlight 'ZinePak	Various Artists	ZinePak LLC/Walmart	March 22	
32	The Best of Rascal Flatts Live	Rascal Flatts	Hollywood	November 8	
11	Better Day	Dolly Parton	Dolly	June 28	
42	Bootleg Volume III	Johnny Cash	Sony Legacy	October 11	
17	The Broken Record	Corey Smith	Average Joe's	June 21	
13	Caldwell County (EP)	Eric Church	Capitol Nashville	January 18	
19	Chippin' Away	Kevin Fowler	Average Joe's	August 9	
44	Christmas Today's Country Volume One	Various Artists	Curb	September 27	
38	Country Christmas	Various Artists	Sony Music Special Products	September 20	
23	Country Classics with a Bluegrass Spin	The Grascals	Cracker Barrel	January 10	
14	Craig Campbell	Craig Campbell	Bigger Picture	April 5	
24	Crazy Girl (EP)	Eli Young Band	Republic Nashville	May 3	
42	The Dreaming Fields	Matraca Berg	Dualtone	May 17	
26	Firewater	Whiskey Myers	Wiggy Thump	April 26	
40	For the Kids (EP)	John Rich	Warner Bros. Nashville	May 17	
33	Frankie Ballard	Frankie Ballard	Warner Bros. Nashville	May 24	
33	From Memphis to Hollywood	Johnny Cash	Columbia/Legacy	February 22	
16	Georgia Clay	Josh Kelley	MCA Nashville	March 22	
14	Ghost to a Ghost/Gutter Town	Hank Williams III	Megaforce/Hank3	September 6	
20	Good Luck & True Love	Reckless Kelly	No Big Deal/Red Eye	September 13	
12	Greatest Hits	Joe Nichols	Show Dog-Universal	January 25	
39	Hits	George Jones	Bandit	February 15	
24	I'm American	Billy Ray Cyrus	Buena Vista	June 28	
41	I Hate You, I Love You	Emily West	Emily West	December 20	
34	I Will Stand by You: The Essential Collection	The Judds	Curb	April 5	
22	Icon	Billy Currington	Mercury Nashville	March 22	
14	Icon	George Strait	MCA Nashville	September 13	
20	Icon	Josh Turner	MCA Nashville	March 22	
44	Icon	Conway Twitty	MCA Nashville	May 24	
35	Icon 2	George Strait	MCA Nashville	November 8	
19	It's All Good	Joe Nichols	Show Dog-Universal	November 8	
16	It's Only Natural	The Oak Ridge Boys	Cracker Barrell	September 19	
12	KMAG YOYO	Hayes Carll	Lost Highway	February 15	
32	Little Bird	Kasey Chambers	Sugar Hill	July 12	
11	The Lost Notebooks of Hank Williams	Various Artists	CMF/Columbia Nashville	October 4	
30	Love Don't Run	Steve Holy	Curb	September 13	
37	The Majestic Silver Strings	Buddy Miller	New West	March 1	
50	The Monument Singles – A-Sides (1960–1964)	Roy Orbison	Legacy	April 26	
20	Mud Digger: Volume 2	Various Artists	Average Joe's	July 19	
22	The Music Inside: A Collaboration; Dedicated to Waylon Jennings, Volume One	Various Artists	Scatter/Valory Music Co.	February 8	
22	Nick 13	Nick 13	Sugar Hill	June 7	
33	Numbers	Jason Michael Carroll	QuarterBack/GrassRoots/Cracker Barrel	July 25	
12	Opus Collection	Roy Orbison	Legacy	May 10	
36	Raise My Glass	Micky & the Motorcars	Smith Music Group	August 9	
26	Rancho Alto	Jason Boland & the Stragglers	Proud Souls	October 4	
43	Randy Montana	Randy Montana	Mercury Nashville	July 26	
11	Randy Travis	Randy Travis	Cracker Barrel	May 2	
21	Ready for Confetti	Robert Earl Keen	Lost Highway	August 30	
39	Redemption	Josh Gracin	Average Joe's	November 8	
47	A Redneck Christmas	Slidawg and the Redneck Ramblers	Sonoma	September 27	
40	Remember Me, Vol. 1	Willie Nelson	R&J	November 21	
35	Rich Rocks (EP)	John Rich	Warner Bros. Nashville	May 17	
46	Satisfied at Last	Joe Ely	Redeye	June 7	
34	Sleep with One Eye Open	Chris Thile & Michael Daves	Nonesuch	May 10	
14	Some Lessons Learned	Kristin Chenoweth	Sony Masterworks	September 13	
29	Songs and Stories	Guy Clark	Dualtone	August 16	
41	Sunny Sweeney (EP)	Sunny Sweeney	Republic Nashville	January 18	
43	Take the High Road	The Blind Boys of Alabama	Saguaro Road	May 3	
13	This Is Indian Land	Cody Canada	Underground Sound	June 21	
38	Top 50 Hottest Country Hits NOW	Modern Country Heroes	Big Eye Music	October 1	
15	Velvet	Stoney LaRue	B Side	August 30	
39	A Very Country Christmas (EP)	Various Artists	Arista Nashville	October 11	
11	Where Country Grows	Ashton Shepherd	MCA Nashville	July 12	
48	Wild Together	Carter's Chord	Show Dog-Universal	May 24	
30	Working in Tennessee	Merle Haggard	Vanguard Records	October 4	

== Deaths ==
- January 10 – Margaret Whiting, 86, female country and pop vocalist of the 1940s and early 1950s. (natural causes)
- January 19 – James O'Gwynn, 82, singer of the late 1950s and early 1960s, best known for his hit "My Name Is Mud."
- January 26 – Charlie Louvin, 83, singer/songwriter who teamed with brother Ira as The Louvin Brothers, and became a star in his own right after Ira's death. (pancreatic cancer)
- March 17 – Ferlin Husky, 85, singer/songwriter of the 1950s and 1960s who had hits with "Gone" and "Wings of a Dove." (congestive heart failure)
- March 30 – Harley Allen, 55, songwriter, writer of several country songs such as "The Baby" and "Awful, Beautiful Life." (lung cancer)
- March 31 – Mel McDaniel, 68, Grand Ole Opry member and singer of several major hits in the 1980s including the No. 1 single, "Baby's Got Her Blue Jeans On," in 1985. (cancer)
- July 29 – Jack Barlow, 87, singer of several hits in the 1960s such as "I Love Country Music" and "Catch the Wind."
- August 7 – Marshall Grant, 83, bassist of Johnny Cash's original backing duo, The Tennessee Two.
- August 10 – Billy Grammer, 85, Grand Ole Opry member best known for his hit "Gotta Travel On." (natural causes)
- September 12 – Don Wayne, 78, songwriter who wrote "Country Bumpkin." (cancer)
- September 13 – Wilma Lee Cooper, 90, Grand Ole Opry member. (natural causes)
- September 27 – Johnnie Wright, 97, singer/songwriter who was part of Johnnie and Jack and husband of Kitty Wells. (natural causes)
- September 27 – Johnny "Country" Mathis, 80, singer/songwriter and member of Jimmy & Johnny, but not confused to the pop crooner. (pneumonia)
- October 12 – Joel "Taz" DiGregorio, 67, keyboardist for The Charlie Daniels Band. (car accident)
- October 31 – Liz Anderson, 81, singer/songwriter wrote Merle Haggard's The Fugitive and is the mother of Lynn. (heart and lung disease)
- December 14 – Billie Jo Spears, 74, singer of several major hits in the 1970s including the No. 1 single, "Blanket on the Ground," in 1975. (cancer)

== Hall of Fame Inductees ==
=== Bluegrass Hall of Fame Inductees ===
- Del McCoury
- George Shuffler

=== Country Music Hall of Fame Inductees ===
- Bobby Braddock
- Reba McEntire
- Jean Shepard

=== Canadian Country Music Hall of Fame Inductees ===
- Bill Langstroth
- Michelle Wright

== Major awards ==
=== Academy of Country Music ===
(presented April 1, 2012 in Las Vegas, Nevada)

- Entertainer of the Year – Taylor Swift
- Top Male Vocalist – Blake Shelton
- Top Female Vocalist – Miranda Lambert
- Top Vocal Group – Lady Antebellum
- Top Vocal Duo – Thompson Square
- Top New Artist – Scotty McCreery
- Album of the Year – Four the Record, Miranda Lambert
- Single Record of the Year – "Don't You Wanna Stay", Jason Aldean and Kelly Clarkson
- Song of the Year – "Crazy Girl", Eli Young Band
- Video of the Year – "Red Solo Cup", Toby Keith
- Vocal Event of the Year – "Don't You Wanna Stay", Jason Aldean and Kelly Clarkson

ACM Honors

- Career Achievement Award – Reba McEntire
- Cliffie Stone Pioneer Award – Garth Brooks
- Cliffie Stone Pioneer Award – Larry Gatlin
- Jim Reeves International Award – Taylor Swift
- Mae Boren Axton Award – John Dorris
- Poet's Award – Hank Cochran
- Poet's Award – Tom T. Hall
- Tex Ritter Film Award – Country Strong

=== Americana Music Honors & Awards ===
- Album of the Year – Band of Joy (Robert Plant)
- Artist of the Year – Buddy Miller
- Duo/Group of the Year – The Avett Brothers
- Song of the Year – "Harlem River Blues" (Justin Townes Earle)
- Emerging Artist of the Year – Mumford & Sons
- Instrumentalist of the Year – Buddy Miller
- Lifetime Achievement: Trailblazer – Bob Harris
- Lifetime Achievement: Songwriting – Lucinda Williams
- Lifetime Achievement: Performance – Gregg Allman
- Lifetime Achievement: Instrumentalist – Jerry Douglas
- Lifetime Achievement: Executive – Rick Hall

=== American Music Awards ===
(presented in Los Angeles on November 20, 2011)

- Artist of the Year – Taylor Swift
- Favorite Country Female Artist – Taylor Swift
- Favorite Country Male Artist – Blake Shelton
- Favorite Country Band/Duo/Group – Lady Antebellum
- Favorite Country Album – Speak Now by Taylor Swift

=== American Country Awards ===
(presented December 5 in Las Vegas, Nevada)

- Artist of the Year – Jason Aldean
- Female Artist of the Year – Carrie Underwood
- Male Artist of the Year – Brad Paisley
- Group/Duo of the Year – Lady Antebellum
- Touring Artist of the Year – Jason Aldean
- Album of the Year – My Kinda Party, Jason Aldean
- Breakthrough Artist of the Year – Chris Young
- New Artist of the Year – Scotty McCreery
- Single of the Year – "Voices", Chris Young
- Female Single of the Year – "Mama's Song", Carrie Underwood
- Male Single of the Year – "My Kinda Party", Jason Aldean
- Duo/Group Single of the Year – "Are You Gonna Kiss Me or Not", Thompson Square
- Breakthrough Single of the Year – "Are You Gonna Kiss Me or Not", Thompson Square
- Single by a Vocal Collaboration – "Don't You Wanna Stay", Jason Aldean feat. Kelly Clarkson
- Music Video of the Year – "Who Are You When I'm Not Looking", Blake Shelton
- Female Music Video of the Year – "Mama's Song", Carrie Underwood
- Male Music Video of the Year – "Who Are You When I'm Not Looking", Blake Shelton
- Duo/Group Music Video of the Year – "Don't You Wanna Stay", Jason Aldean feat. Kelly Clarkson
- Breakthrough Music Video of the Year – "Are You Gonna Kiss Me or Not", Thompson Square

=== American Music Awards ===
(presented November 20 in Los Angeles)

- Favorite Male Country Artist – Blake Shelton
- Favorite Female Country Artist – Taylor Swift
- Favorite Country Band/Duo/Group – Lady Antebellum
- Favorite Country Album – Speak Now, Taylor Swift

=== ARIA Awards ===
(presented in Sydney on November 27, 2011)

- Best Country Album – Little Bird (Kasey Chambers)

=== Canadian Country Music Association ===
(presented September 12 in Hamilton)

- Fans' Choice Award – Johnny Reid
- Male Artist of the Year – Johnny Reid
- Female Artist of the Year – Terri Clark
- Group or Duo of the Year – Hey Romeo
- Songwriter(s) of the Year – "Trail in Life", written by Dean Brody
- Single of the Year – "Trail in Life", Dean Brody
- Album of the Year – Trail in Life, Dean Brody
- Top Selling Album – Speak Now, Taylor Swift
- Top Selling Canadian Album – A Place Called Love, Johnny Reid
- CMT Video of the Year – "Today I'm Gonna Try and Change the World", Johnny Reid
- Rising Star Award – Chad Brownlee
- Roots Artist or Group of the Year – Jimmy Rankin

=== Country Music Association ===
(presented November 9 in Nashville)

- Single of the Year – "If I Die Young", The Band Perry
- Song of the Year – "If I Die Young", Kimberly Perry
- Vocal Group of the Year – Lady Antebellum
- New Artist of the Year – The Band Perry
- Album of the Year – My Kinda Party, Jason Aldean
- Musician of the Year – Mac McAnally
- Vocal Duo of the Year – Sugarland
- Music Video of the Year – "You and Tequila", Kenny Chesney featuring Grace Potter
- Male Vocalist of the Year – Blake Shelton
- Female Vocalist of the Year – Miranda Lambert
- Musical Event of the Year – "Don't You Wanna Stay", Jason Aldean with Kelly Clarkson
- Entertainer of the Year – Taylor Swift

=== CMT Music Awards ===
(presented June 8 in Nashville)

- Video of the Year – "Mine", Taylor Swift
- Male Video of the Year – "Who Are You When I'm Not Looking", Blake Shelton
- Female Video of the Year – "The House That Built Me", Miranda Lambert
- Group Video of the Year – "Hello World", Lady Antebellum
- Duo Video of the Year – "Stuck Like Glue", Sugarland
- USA Weekend Breakthrough Video of the Year – "If I Die Young", The Band Perry
- Collaborative Video of the Year – "That Should Be Me", Justin Bieber and Rascal Flatts
- Performance of the Year – "Margaritaville", Jimmy Buffett featuring Zac Brown Band from CMT Crossroads
- Web Video of the Year – "Kiss My Country Ass", Blake Shelton
- Video Director of the Year – Trey Fanjoy
- Nationwide Is On Your Side Award – The Band Perry

CMT Artists of the Year
(presented December 13 in Nashville)

- Jason Aldean
- Kenny Chesney
- Lady Antebellum
- Brad Paisley
- Taylor Swift

=== Grammy Awards ===
(presented February 12, 2012)

- Best Country Solo Performance – "Mean", Taylor Swift
- Best Country Duo/Group Performance – "Barton Hollow", The Civil Wars
- Best Country Song – "Mean", Taylor Swift
- Best Country Album – Own the Night, Lady Antebellum
- Best Bluegrass Album – Paper Airplane, Alison Krauss & Union Station

=== Juno Awards ===
(presented April 1, 2012 in Ottawa)

- Country Album of the Year – Roots and Wings, Terri Clark

=== Hollywood Walk of Fame ===
Star who were honored in 2011

Melissa Etheridge and Shania Twain

== Other links ==
- Country Music Association
- Inductees of the Country Music Hall of Fame
