= List of number-one country singles of 2011 (Canada) =

Canada Country was a chart published weekly by Billboard magazine.

This 50-position chart lists the most popular country music songs, calculated weekly by airplay on 31 country music stations across the country as monitored by Nielsen BDS. Songs are ranked by total plays. As with most other Billboard charts, the Canada Country chart features a rule for when a song enters recurrent rotation. A song is declared recurrent if it has been on the chart longer than 30 weeks and is lower than number 20 in rank.

These are the Canadian number-one country singles of 2011, per the BDS Canada Country Airplay chart.

Note that Billboard publishes charts with an issue date approximately 7–10 days in advance.

Issue date	Country Song	Artist	Ref.
January 1	"Felt Good on My Lips"	Tim McGraw	
January 8	"Felt Good on My Lips"	Tim McGraw	
January 15	"Felt Good on My Lips"	Tim McGraw	
January 22	"Felt Good on My Lips"	Tim McGraw	
January 29	"Somewhere with You"	Kenny Chesney	
February 5	"Somewhere with You"	Kenny Chesney	
February 12	"Somewhere with You"	Kenny Chesney	
February 19	"Somewhere with You"	Kenny Chesney	
February 26	"This Is Country Music"	Brad Paisley	
March 5	"This Is Country Music"	Brad Paisley	
March 12	"This Is Country Music"	Brad Paisley	
March 19	"Don't You Wanna Stay"	Jason Aldean featuring Kelly Clarkson	
March 26	"Don't You Wanna Stay"	Jason Aldean featuring Kelly Clarkson	
April 2	"Don't You Wanna Stay"	Jason Aldean featuring Kelly Clarkson	
April 9	"Don't You Wanna Stay"	Jason Aldean featuring Kelly Clarkson	
April 16	"Don't You Wanna Stay"	Jason Aldean featuring Kelly Clarkson	
April 23	"Colder Weather"	Zac Brown Band	
April 30	"Colder Weather"	Zac Brown Band	
May 7	"Are You Gonna Kiss Me or Not"	Thompson Square	
May 14	"Live a Little"	Kenny Chesney	
May 21	"I Won't Let Go"	Rascal Flatts	
May 28	"I Won't Let Go"	Rascal Flatts	
June 4	"Old Alabama"	Brad Paisley featuring Alabama	
June 11	"Old Alabama"	Brad Paisley featuring Alabama	
June 18	"Old Alabama"	Brad Paisley featuring Alabama	
June 25	"Honey Bee"	Blake Shelton	
July 2	"Honey Bee"	Blake Shelton	
July 9	"Honey Bee"	Blake Shelton	
July 16	"Knee Deep"	Zac Brown Band	
July 23	"Knee Deep"	Zac Brown Band	
July 30	"Knee Deep"	Zac Brown Band	
August 6	"Just a Kiss"	Lady Antebellum	
August 13	"Just a Kiss"	Lady Antebellum	
August 20	"Just a Kiss"	Lady Antebellum	
August 27	"Am I the Only One"	Dierks Bentley	
September 3	"Am I the Only One"	Dierks Bentley	
September 10	"Remind Me"	Brad Paisley featuring Carrie Underwood	
September 17	"Long Hot Summer"	Keith Urban	
September 24	"Long Hot Summer"	Keith Urban	
October 1	"Long Hot Summer"	Keith Urban	
October 8	"Long Hot Summer"	Keith Urban	
October 15	"Take a Back Road"	Rodney Atkins	
October 22	"Take a Back Road"	Rodney Atkins	
October 29	"God Gave Me You"	Blake Shelton	
November 5	"We Owned the Night"	Lady Antebellum	
November 12	"We Owned the Night"	Lady Antebellum	
November 19	"We Owned the Night"	Lady Antebellum	
November 26	"We Owned the Night"	Lady Antebellum	
December 3	"Keep Me in Mind"	Zac Brown Band	
December 10	"Keep Me in Mind"	Zac Brown Band	
December 17	"Keep Me in Mind"	Zac Brown Band	
December 24	"Keep Me in Mind"	Zac Brown Band	
December 31	"Tattoos on This Town"	Jason Aldean	

== See also ==
- 2011 in music
- List of number-one country singles of 2011 (U.S.)
