= List of Hot Country Songs number ones of 2011 =

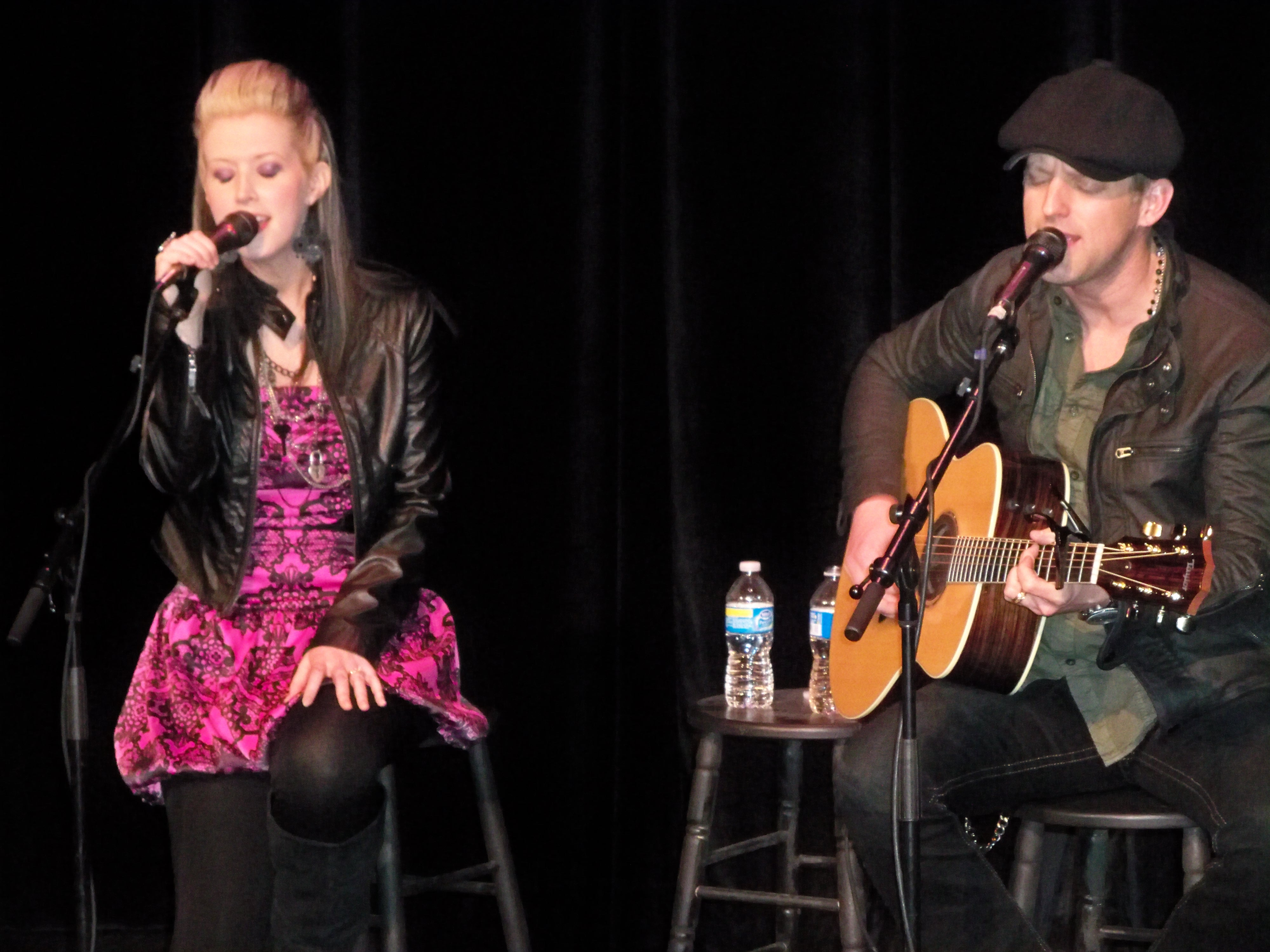
Husband and wife duo Thompson Square topped the chart for the first time.

Hot Country Songs is a chart that ranks the top-performing country music songs in the United States, published by Billboard magazine. In 2011, 34 different songs topped the chart in 52 issues of the magazine, based on weekly airplay data from country music radio stations compiled by Nielsen Broadcast Data Systems.

In the issue dated January 1, Reba McEntire (credited for this release simply as Reba), moved to number one with "Turn On the Radio", replacing "Why Wait" by Rascal Flatts, which had held the top spot since the issue of Billboard dated December 18, 2010. It was the 25th number-one country single of McEntire's career, tying the record for the highest number of chart-toppers by a female artist held by Dolly Parton. Blake Shelton spent the most weeks in the top spot in 2011, with eight, and his song "Honey Bee" had the longest run at the top by an individual song, spending four weeks in the top spot. Shelton was one of two acts to reach the top spot with three different songs, the other being Zac Brown Band. Jason Aldean, Kenny Chesney, Lady Antebellum, Brad Paisley and Chris Young each had two number ones. Paisley's two chart-toppers were both collaborations, one with Carrie Underwood and one with the band Alabama. Their appearance on the song "Old Alabama" gave the namesake band their first number one for 18 years. Sara Evans gained her first number one single since 2005 with "A Little Bit Stronger", and was the only female solo artist to have a multi-week number one single during the year.

Four acts topped the chart for the first time in 2011. The first was the duo Thompson Square, who spent a single week at number one in April with "Are You Gonna Kiss Me or Not". In September, Jake Owen reached number one for the first time with "Barefoot Blue Jean Night", followed in November by "Crazy Girl" by Eli Young Band. Although it only spent a single week at the top, "Crazy Girl" was ranked number one on Billboard's year-end chart of the most popular country songs. The final act to reach number one for the first time was Brantley Gilbert, whose song "Country Must Be Country Wide" topped the chart for one week in December. The final number one of the year was "Keep Me in Mind" by Zac Brown Band.

== Chart history ==
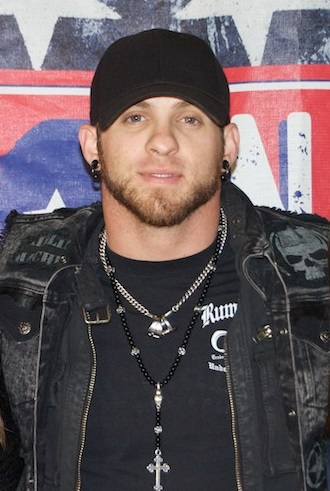
Brantley Gilbert achieved the first number one of his career in 2011 with "Country Must Be Country Wide".

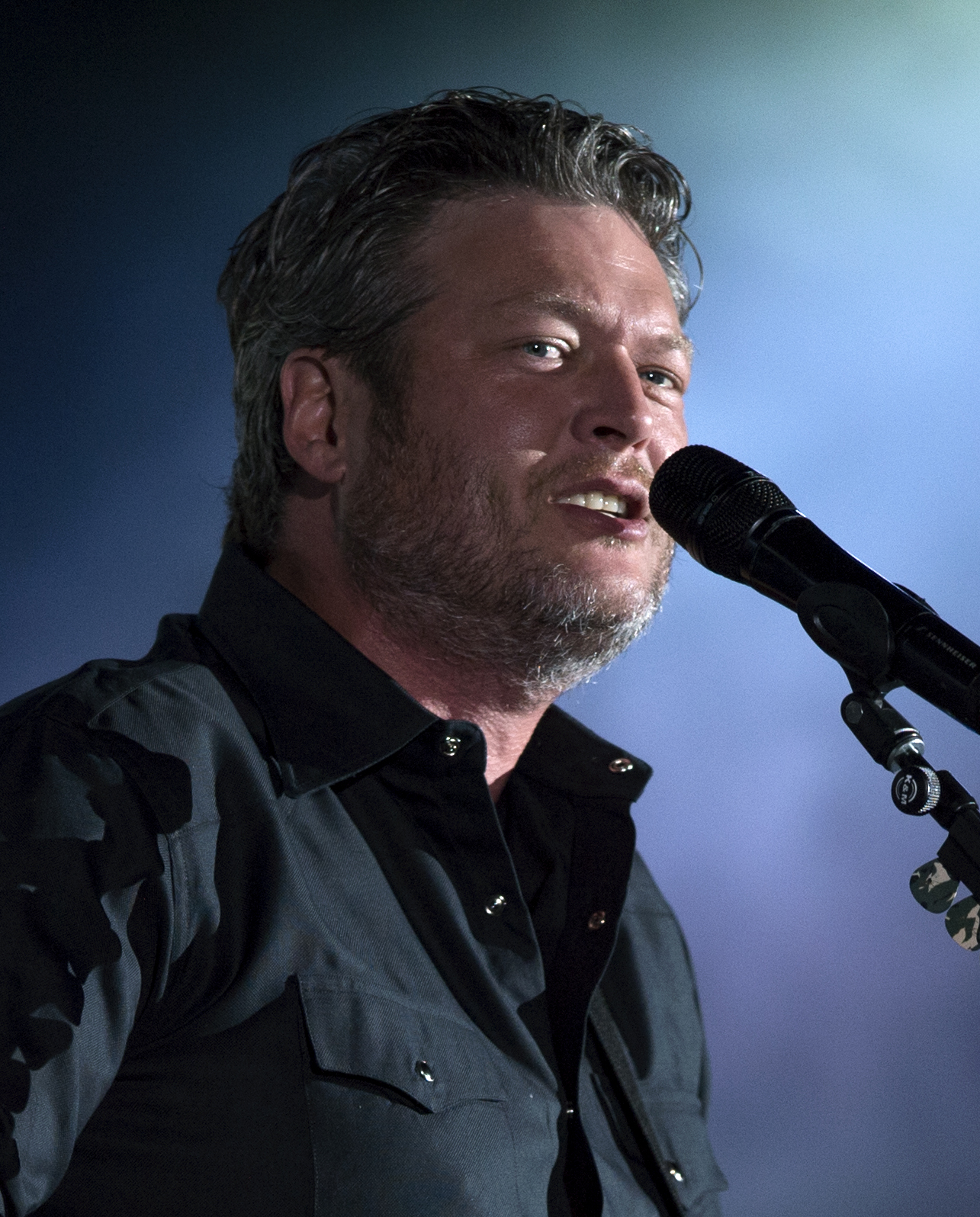
Blake Shelton spent the most weeks at number one of any artist in 2011, with eight weeks in the top spot.

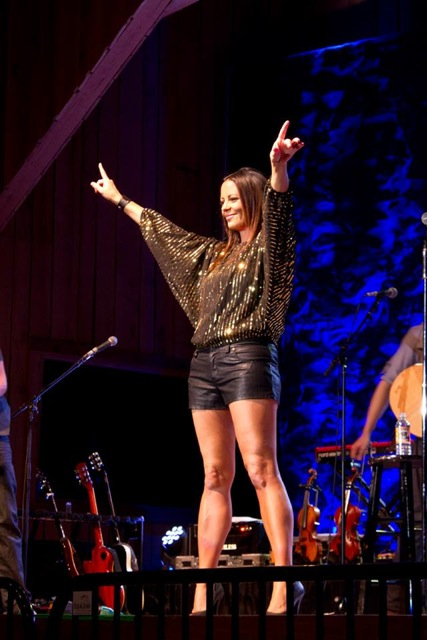
Sara Evans was the only female soloist to spend more than one week at number one in 2011.

Issue date	Title	Artist(s)	Ref.
January 1	"Turn On the Radio"	Reba (Note: Reba McEntire was credited simply as Reba on this release.)	
January 8	"Felt Good on My Lips"	Tim McGraw	
January 15	"Felt Good on My Lips"	Tim McGraw	
January 22	"Felt Good on My Lips"	Tim McGraw	
January 29	"Somewhere with You"	Kenny Chesney	
February 5	"Somewhere with You"	Kenny Chesney	
February 12	"Somewhere with You"	Kenny Chesney	
February 19	"Voices"	Chris Young	
February 26	"Someone Else Calling You Baby"	Luke Bryan	
March 5	"Who Are You When I'm Not Looking"	Blake Shelton	
March 12	"Don't You Wanna Stay"	Jason Aldean and Kelly Clarkson	
March 19	"Don't You Wanna Stay"	Jason Aldean and Kelly Clarkson	
March 26	"Don't You Wanna Stay"	Jason Aldean and Kelly Clarkson	
April 2	"Let Me Down Easy"	Billy Currington	
April 9	"Are You Gonna Kiss Me or Not"	Thompson Square	
April 16	"Colder Weather"	Zac Brown Band	
April 23	"Colder Weather"	Zac Brown Band	
April 30	"This"	Darius Rucker	
May 7	"Live a Little"	Kenny Chesney	
May 14	"A Little Bit Stronger"	Sara Evans	
May 21	"A Little Bit Stronger"	Sara Evans	
May 28	"Heart Like Mine"	Miranda Lambert	
June 4	"Old Alabama"	Brad Paisley featuring Alabama	
June 11	"Old Alabama"	Brad Paisley featuring Alabama	
June 18	"Without You"	Keith Urban	
June 25	"Honey Bee"	Blake Shelton	
July 2	"Honey Bee"	Blake Shelton	
July 9	"Honey Bee"	Blake Shelton	
July 16	"Honey Bee"	Blake Shelton	
July 23	"If Heaven Wasn't So Far Away"	Justin Moore	
July 30	"Dirt Road Anthem"	Jason Aldean	
August 6	"Tomorrow"	Chris Young	
August 13	"Knee Deep"	Zac Brown Band featuring Jimmy Buffett	
August 20	"Just a Kiss"	Lady Antebellum	
August 27	"Just a Kiss"	Lady Antebellum	
September 3	"Am I the Only One"	Dierks Bentley	
September 10	"Remind Me"	Brad Paisley, duet with Carrie Underwood	
September 17	"Barefoot Blue Jean Night"	Jake Owen	
September 24	"Barefoot Blue Jean Night"	Jake Owen	
October 1	"Take a Back Road"	Rodney Atkins	
October 8	"Take a Back Road"	Rodney Atkins	
October 15	"Made in America"	Toby Keith	
October 22	"Long Hot Summer"	Keith Urban	
October 29	"God Gave Me You"	Blake Shelton	
November 5	"God Gave Me You"	Blake Shelton	
November 12	"God Gave Me You"	Blake Shelton	
November 19	"Crazy Girl"	Eli Young Band	
November 26	"Sparks Fly"	Taylor Swift	
December 3	"Country Must Be Country Wide"	Brantley Gilbert	
December 10	"We Owned the Night"	Lady Antebellum	
December 17	"We Owned the Night"	Lady Antebellum	
December 24	"Keep Me in Mind"	Zac Brown Band	
December 31	"Keep Me in Mind"	Zac Brown Band	

== See also ==
- 2011 in music
- List of artists who reached number one on the U.S. country chart
