= 46th Academy of Country Music Awards =

US music awards ceremony in 2011

- Date: April 3, 2011
- Location: MGM Grand Garden Arena and Mandalay Bay
- Hosted by: Reba McEntire; Blake Shelton

Highlights
- Most wins: Miranda Lambert (3)
- Most nominations: Miranda Lambert (6)

Television/radio coverage
- Network: CBS
- Directed by: Glenn Weiss

The 46th Academy of Country Music Awards were held on April 3, 2011, at the MGM Grand Garden Arena and Mandalay Bay in Las Vegas, Nevada. The ceremony was hosted by Reba McEntire and Blake Shelton.

== Winners and nominees ==
Winners are shown in bold.

Entertainer of the Year (Note: From 2008 to 2015, 'Entertainer of the Year' was decided by a combination of ACM professional membership and fan votes cast online and via text message.)	Album of the Year
**Taylor Swift**; Jason Aldean; Toby Keith; Brad Paisley; Keith Urban; Miranda Lambert	**Need You Now – Lady Antebellum**; Hemingway’s Whiskey – Kenny Chesney; The Guitar Song – Jamey Johnson; Speak Now – Taylor Swift; Up On The Ridge – Dierks Bentley; You Get What You Give – Zac Brown Band
Female Artist of the Year	Male Artist of the Year
**Miranda Lambert**; Reba McEntire; Taylor Swift; Carrie Underwood; Lee Ann Womack	**Brad Paisley**; Jason Aldean; Blake Shelton; George Strait; Keith Urban
Vocal Group of the Year	Vocal Duo of the Year
**Lady Antebellum**; Little Big Town; Randy Rogers Band; The Band Perry; Zac Brown Band	**Sugarland**; Joey + Rory; Montgomery Gentry; Steel Magnolia; The JaneDear Girls
Single of the Year	Song of the Year
**"The House That Built Me" - Miranda Lambert**; "A Little More Country Than That" – Easton Corbin; "As She’s Walking Away" – Zac Brown Band and Alan Jackson; "If I Die Young" – The Band Perry; "Love Like Crazy" – Lee Brice; "The Boys Of Fall" - Kenny Chesney	**"The House That Built Me" – Tom Douglas and Allen Shamblin**; "A Little More Country Than That" – Rory Lee Feek, Don Poythress and Wynn Varble; "As She’s Walking Away" – Zac Brown and Wyatt Durrette; "If I Die Young" – Kimberly Perry; "Love Like Crazy" – Tim James and Doug Johnson
Best New Artist of the Year	Video of the Year
**The Band Perry**; Eric Church	**"The House That Built Me" – Miranda Lambert**; "Hillbilly Bone" – Blake Shelton and Trace Adkins; "Only Prettier" – Miranda Lambert; "Stuck Like Glue" – Sugarland; "The Boys Of Fall" – Kenny Chesney
Vocal Event of the Year
**"As She's Walking Away" – Zac Brown Band and Alan Jackson**; "Blue Sky" – Emily West and Keith Urban; "Coal Miner's Daughter" – Loretta Lynn, Sheryl Crow and Miranda Lambert; "Cold Beer" – Colt Ford and Jamey Johnson; "Good To Be Me" – Uncle Kracker and Kid Rock

== Performers ==
Performer(s)	Song(s)
Brad Paisley; Alabama	Opening Performance "Old Alabama"
Toby Keith	"Somewhere Else"
Carrie Underwood; Steven Tyler	"Undo It" "Walk This Way"
Sugarland	"Tonight"
Dierks Bentley	"Am I the Only One"
Keith Urban	"Without You"
Eric Church	"Smoke a Little Smoke"
Taylor Swift	"Mean"
The Band Perry	"If I Die Young"
Jason Aldean	"Dirt Road Anthem"
Blake Shelton	"Honey Bee"
Sara Evans	"A Little Bit Stronger"
Miranda Lambert	"Heart Like Mine"
Jennifer Nettles; Rihanna	"California King Bed"
Ronnie Dunn	"Bleed Red"
Martina McBride	"Teenage Daughters"
Darius Rucker	"Music From The Heart"
Reba McEntire	"When Love Gets a Hold of You"
Zac Brown; James Taylor	"Colder Weather" "Sweet Baby James"

== Presenters ==
Award	Presenter(s)
Song of the Year	Brooklyn Decker; Chace Crawford
Single of the Year	Nancy O'Dell
Top New Artist of the Year	Luke Bryan
Album of the Year	Miranda Lambert
Top Vocal Group of the Year	Donny Osmond; Marie Osmond
Top Male Artist of the Year	Marg Helgenberger
Top Vocal Duo of the Year	Wynonna Judd; Naomi Judd
Top Female Artist of the Year	Reese Witherspoon; Robert Pattinson
Entertainer of the Year	Ryan Seacrest
