= Masterpiece (Thompson Square album) =

Studio album by Thompson Square
- Released: June 1, 2018
- Genre: Country
- Label: T2 Music
- Producers: Kiefer Thompson; Shawna Thompson; Dann Huff; Nathan Chapman; Ilya Toshinsky

Thompson Square chronology
Just Feels Good (2013)	Masterpiece (2018)

Singles from Masterpiece
- 1. "Masterpiece" Released: July 22, 2019

Masterpiece is the third studio album by American country music duo Thompson Square. It was released independently on June 1, 2018.

== Background ==
Thompson Square had previously recorded for Broken Bow Records' Stoney Creek imprint, but left the label in 2017 after the underperformance of "Trans Am" and "You Make It Look So Good", singles intended for a third Stoney Creek album. Following their departure from the label, the two began composing songs for the album, including the title track, which group member Kiefer Thompson wrote about their son Rigney. Both members of the duo produced the album with Dann Huff, Nathan Chapman, and Ilya Toshinsky.

Lyrically "Up In Smoke" tells the story of how Kiefer and Shawna Thompson got together. Billboard wrote that "And on the other end of the emotional spectrum, there’s “Breakers,” which closes the disc. It’s perhaps the most passionate and emotional that Shawna Thompson has ever sounded. Her spouse says that’s for good reason." "Breakers" was written about a family member that Shawna Thompson had to cut out of her life. The song was pieced together, because Shawna was crying during the recording process.

== Critical reception ==
Sounds Like Nashville writer Annie Reuter praised the variety of instrumentation and lyrical strength of the album, concluding that "their entire album spans a multitude of emotions and genres that keeps the listener intrigued."

== Track listing ==
According to MusicRow.

1. "Masterpiece" (Keifer Thompson) - 4:07
2. "Up in Smoke" (Brad Warren, Brett Warren, K. Thompson, Shawna Thompson) - 4:00
3. "Millionaires" (Marv Green, Catt Gravitt, Courtney Cole) - 2:48
4. "Stupid Girls Stupid Boys" (Ben Caver, Sara Haze, AJ Pruis, Laura Veltz) - 3:20
5. "Let’s Do Something Stupid" (Jason Lehning, K. Thompson) - 3:22
6. "Stuck in My Head" (Brad Warren, Brett Warren, K. Thompson, S. Thompson) - 3:39
7. "Good Day" (Erik Belz, Frank Rogers, K. Thompson, S. Thompson) - 3:19
8. "I Know This Guy" (Mike Fiorentino, K. Thompson) - 4:18
9. "A Love Like This" (Cary Barlowe, K. Thompson) - 3:20
10. "Make It Rain" (Emily Weisband, Green, K. Thompson) - 3:37
11. "Breakers" (Marti Dodson, Patrick Droney, K. Thompson) - 3:56

== Chart performance ==
Chart (2018)	Peak position
US Independent Albums (Billboard)	44
