= You Get What You Give =

You Get What You Give may refer to:

- "You Get What You Give" (song), a 1998 song by the New Radicals
- You Get What You Give (album), a 2010 album by the Zac Brown Band
