= Nothing Like This (album) =

Studio album by Rascal Flatts
- Released: November 16, 2010
- Recorded: March–June 2010
- Genre: Country
- Length: 41:51
- Label: Big Machine
- Producers: Dann Huff; Rascal Flatts

Rascal Flatts chronology
Unstoppable (2009)	Nothing Like This (2010)	The Best of Rascal Flatts Live (2011)

Singles from Nothing Like This
- 1. "Why Wait" Released: August 2, 2010; 2. "I Won't Let Go" Released: January 10, 2011; 3. "Easy" Released: June 27, 2011

Nothing Like This is the seventh studio album by American country music group Rascal Flatts. Released on November 16, 2010, it is their debut release after signing with Big Machine Records after Lyric Street went out of business. The album's lead-off single, "Why Wait," was released on August 2, 2010. This song became their first number one single on the Hot Country Songs charts since "Here Comes Goodbye." The album's second single, "I Won't Let Go" was released to country radio on January 10, 2011. The third single, "Easy" was released to country radio on June 27, 2011. Nothing Like This received a vinyl press in 2026. This is the band's most recent album to go platinum.

== Content ==
In the weeks leading up to the album's release, three promotional singles were released for music download; "I Won't Let Go" was released on October 25, 2010, "Play" on November 2, 2010, and the title track on November 9, 2010.

In 2022, bassist Jay DeMarcus re-recorded the track "All Night To Get There" with his new group, Generation Radio, singing lead vocals.

== Reception ==
=== Commercial ===
The album debuted at number six on the U.S. Billboard 200 and number one on the U.S. Billboard Top Country Albums, selling 165,000 copies in its first week of release. It has sold 1.1 million copies in the United States as of the chart dated March 24, 2012.

=== Critical ===
Professional ratings
Review scores
Source	Rating
AllMusic	4/5 stars
Associated Press	(positive)
Billboard	(favorable)
Country Weekly	4/5 stars
Roughstock	3.5/5 stars

Nothing Like This has received positive reviews from most critics. Stephen Thomas Erlewine with AllMusic gave the album a four-star review, saying "Nothing Like This doesn't offer anything new, it's Rascal Flatts who have never strayed from the sunny sound of their 2000 debut - but everything from the melodies to the very sound of the tight 11-track record seems brighter than the trio's last few records. It's a fresh coat of paint on a sturdy old house". Gary Graff of Billboard magazine gave it a favorable review, saying that "[t]he trio's harmonies remain as crisp as a fresh pair of Wranglers; polished, deceptively effortless and relentlessly tuneful, Nothing Like This is everything we've come to expect from Rascal Flatts".

Michael McCall of the Associated Press gave the album a positive review, saying that it had a "breezier, melodic sound" compared to the group's previous releases. Kyle Ward of Roughstock gave it three-and-a-half stars out of five, saying that it was more consistent than the band's last two albums for former label Lyric Street Records. Jessica Phillips of Country Weekly gave the album a four-star rating, saying that Rascal Flatts "sounded re-energized", and commented saying "overall the Flatts boys haven't sounded this good in a while".

== Track listing ==
No.	Title	Writer(s)	Length
1.	"Why Wait"	Neil Thrasher, Tom Shapiro, Jimmy Yeary	3:45
2.	"Easy" (featuring Natasha Bedingfield)	Katrina Elam, Michael Mobley	3:38
3.	"Sunday Afternoon"	Joe Don Rooney, busbee	3:51
4.	"Play"	Bonnie Baker, Elam, Hunter Hayes	3:44
5.	"Nothing Like This"	Michael Dulaney, Shapiro, Thrasher	3:55
6.	"All Night to Get There"	Jay DeMarcus, Paul Jenkins, Jason Sellers	3:21
7.	"Red Camaro"	Joe Collins, Chris Tompkins	3:46
8.	"They Try"	Thrasher, Shapiro, Yeary	4:15
9.	"Summer Young"	Gary LeVox, Wendell Mobley, Thrasher	4:12
10.	"Tonight Tonight"	LeVox, Chris Lindsey, Aimee Mayo, Ryan Tedder	3:42
11.	"I Won't Let Go"	Steve Robson, Sellers	3:47
Total length:			41:51

== Personnel ==
Rascal Flatts

- Jay DeMarcus – keyboards, bass guitar, backing vocals
- Gary Levox – lead vocals
- Joe Don Rooney – electric guitar, backing vocals

Additional Musicians

- Tim Akers – acoustic piano
- Robbie Buchanan – acoustic piano, Hammond B3 organ
- Charlie Judge – keyboards, synthesizers, Hammond B3 organ
- Tom Bukovac – electric guitar
- Dann Huff – electric guitar, acoustic guitar, banjo, mandolin, sitar
- Tim Pierce – electric guitar
- Adam Shoenfeld – electric guitar
- Ilya Toshinsky – acoustic guitar
- Dan Dugmore – steel guitar
- Jonathan Yudkin – fiddle, mandolin
- Dorian Crozier – drums
- Shannon Forrest – drums
- Chris McHugh – drums
- David Huff – percussion, programming
- Natasha Bedingfield – lead and harmony vocals on "Easy"

=== Production ===
- Dann Huff – producer
- Rascal Flatts – producers
- Brian Kennedy – co-producer (2)
- Ben Fowler – recording
- Justin Niebank – recording, mixing
- Drew Bollman – recording assistant, mix assistant
- Tomas Del Toro-Diaz – recording assistant
- Leland Elliott – recording assistant
- Seth Morton – recording assistant
- David Huff – digital editing
- Sean Neff – digital editing
- Christopher Rowe – digital editing
- Adam Ayan – mastering
- Mike "Frog" Griffith – production coordinator
- Whitney Sutton – copy coordinator
- Glenn Sweitzer – art direction, package design
- Chapman Baehler – photography
- John Murphy – wardrobe
- Melissa Schleicher – hair, makeup

== Charts ==
=== Weekly charts ===
Chart (2010)	Peak position
Canadian Albums (Billboard)	14
US Billboard 200	6
US Top Country Albums (Billboard)	1

=== Year-end charts ===
Chart (2011)	Position
US Billboard 200	17
US Top Country Albums (Billboard)	3
Chart (2012)	Position
US Top Country Albums (Billboard)	51

=== Singles ===
Year	Single	Peak chart positions			
Year	Single	US Country	US	US AC	CAN
2010	"Why Wait"	1	48	—	60
2011	"I Won't Let Go"	2	31	—	39
2011	"Easy" (with Natasha Bedingfield)	3	43	20	—
"—" denotes releases that did not chart

== Certifications ==
Region	Certification
Canada (Music Canada)	Gold
United States (RIAA)	Platinum

== Release history ==
Country	Date	Label	Edition(s)
United States	November 16, 2010	Big Machine Records	CD, Digital download
Canada	November 16, 2010	Universal Music	CD, Digital download
Australia	November 19, 2010	Universal Music	CD, Digital download
New Zealand	November 19, 2010	Universal Music	CD, Digital download
Sweden	January 23, 2013	Lionheart Music Group	CD, Digital download
