= Just Feels Good =

Studio album by Thompson Square
- Released: March 26, 2013
- Genre: Country
- Length: 44:56
- Label: Stoney Creek
- Producer: New Voice Entertainment

Thompson Square chronology
Thompson Square (2011)	Just Feels Good (2013)	Masterpiece (2018)

Singles from Just Feels Good
- 1. "If I Didn't Have You" Released: October 29, 2012; 2. "Everything I Shouldn't Be Thinking About" Released: June 10, 2013; 3. "Testing the Water" Released: April 21, 2014; 4. "I Can't Outrun You" Released: June 23, 2014

Just Feels Good is the second studio album by American country music duo Thompson Square. It was released on March 26, 2013, via Stoney Creek Records. As with their first album, it was produced by New Voice Entertainment.

== Background ==
On October 29, 2012, "If I Didn't Have You," was released as the lead-off single from Just Feels Good. For the chart dated May 11, 2013, it ascended to the top of the Billboard Country Airplay chart, becoming their second Number One hit. "Everything I Shouldn't Be Thinking About" was released as the album's second single on June 10, 2013. It became the duo's fourth Top Ten hit when it reached a peak of No. 4 on the Country Airplay chart in early 2014.

"Testing the Water" was released as the third single from the album in April 2014, although was pulled shortly after spending only a few weeks on the charts. "I Can't Outrun You," a song previously recorded by Trace Adkins on his 2008 album X, was issued as the album's fourth single.

== Critical reception ==
Professional ratings
Review scores
Source	Rating
Country Weekly	B+
Got Country Online	5/5 stars
The Plain Dealer	C
Roughstock	4/5 stars
Taste of Country	3/5 stars
USA Today	3/4 stars

Brian Mansfield of USA Today evoked how the "songs play like a rom-com with dual narrators. They've got all the elements — meet-cutes, separation, obstacles and a happy ending — plus a soundtrack that mixes '70s-rock guitar with mandolin and pedal steel." Conversely, Chuck Yarborough of The Plain Dealer called it an "autobiographical album" that "is just too dang slick, and that love becomes cloying instead of sweet." Tammy Ragusa of Country Weekly found that the album finds the duo "laughing in the face of fear" and in doing that have crafted a "palpable" work, which she suggest that the next album be called "Just Feels Better." Taste of Country's Billy Dukes affirmed that the album "would benefit from a wider range of experiences and production approaches. It’s an album jammed full of happy love songs that, even with creative interpretation, begins to lose an edge." This is because that "As a collection of songs, however, Thompson Square simply rely too much on one dimension", and suggest that having a "single song about death, dogs, tractors … anything, really, would be a great way to break up the sweet monotony." However, Got Country Online's Donna Block vowed that the album "is a testament to the strength of their relationship." Roughstock's Matt Bjorke suggested that the duo are "ready to up the ante" because " Everything about Just Feels Good is better" that their debut effort, and he proclaimed that "more strong albums like Just Feels Good it's hard to see their run of hits ending anytime soon."

== Commercial performance ==
The album debuted at number 13 on the US Billboard 200 and number 4 on the Billboard Top Country Albums chart, with first week sales of 36,000 copies.

== Track listing ==
No.	Title	Writer(s)	Length
1.	"Everything I Shouldn't Be Thinking About"	Kiefer Thompson, Shawna Thompson, David Lee Murphy, Brett James	2:58
2.	"Here We Go Again"	K. Thompson, S. Thompson, Vicky McGehee, David Fanning	3:29
3.	"You Don't Get Lucky"	Murphy, Bob DiPiero, Tom Shapiro	3:50
4.	"That's So Me and You"	K. Thompson, McGehee, Kyle Jacobs	3:43
5.	"I Can't Outrun You"	Jacobs, Joe Leathers, Ben Glover	3:02
6.	"Testing the Water"	Luke Laird, Shane McAnally, Hillary Lindsey	3:12
7.	"For the Life of Me"	K. Thompson, S. Thompson, Murphy, James	3:06
8.	"If I Didn't Have You"	K. Thompson, S. Thompson, Jason Sellers, Paul Jenkins	3:22
9.	"Here's to Being Here"	K. Thompson, S. Thompson, Murphy, James	3:55
10.	"Just Feels Good"	Bobby Pinson, Brad Warren, Brett Warren	3:16
11.	"Maybe It's You"	Jacobs, McGehee, Kylie Sackley	3:28
12.	"Run"	Ross Copperman, Michael Davey	3:29
13.	"Home Is You"	Jon Nite, Jimmy Robbins	4:06
Total length:			44:56

Walmart Exclusive Edition
No.	Title	Writer(s)	Length
14.	"Smile On My Mouth"	K. Thompson, S. Thompson, Sellers, Jenkins	3:44
15.	"That's Why We Roll"	K. Thompson, S. Thompson, McGehee, Jacobs	3:24
16.	"What Am I Gonna Do (Daddy's Song)"	K. Thompson, S. Thompson, McGehee, Jacobs	4:06
Total length:			56:10

- "What Am I Gonna Do (Daddy's Song)" was written in memory of Shawna's late father. Shawna sang solo in this song and does not have Keifer singing lead or background.

== Personnel ==
=== Thompson Square ===
- Keifer Thompson - vocals
- Shawna Thompson - vocals

=== Additional Musicians ===
- Kurt Allison - electric guitar
- Jake Clayton - cello, violin
- David Fanning - programming
- Tony Harrell - accordion, Hammond B-3 organ, keyboards, piano
- Mike Johnson - steel guitar
- Tully Kennedy - bass guitar
- Rob McNelley - electric guitar
- Rich Redmond - drums, percussion
- Jeff Roach - Hammond B-3 organ, keyboards, piano
- Adam Shoenfeld - electric guitar
- Ilya Toshinsky - banjo, acoustic guitar, mandolin, resonator guitar

== Chart performance ==
=== Weekly charts ===
Chart (2013)	Peak position
US Billboard 200	13
US Top Country Albums (Billboard)	4
US Independent Albums (Billboard)	1

=== Year-end charts ===
Chart (2013)	Position
US Top Country Albums (Billboard)	42
US Independent Albums (Billboard)	29

=== Singles ===
Year	Single	Peak chart positions				
Year	Single	US Country	US Country Airplay	US	CAN Country	CAN
2012	"If I Didn't Have You"	7	1	49	14	70
2013	"Everything I Shouldn't Be Thinking About"	15	4	69	11	72
2014	"Testing the Water"	—	55	—	—	—
2014	"I Can't Outrun You"	—	52	—	—	—
"—" denotes releases that did not chart
