= I'm Your Man (Jason Sellers album) =

Studio album by Jason Sellers
- Released: September 30, 1997
- Studio: Emerald Sound, The Music Mill and Sound Stage Studios (Nashville, Tennessee); Ultrasound Studios (Woodland Hills, California)
- Genre: Country
- Length: 37:27
- Label: BNA
- Producer: Chris Farren

Jason Sellers chronology
I'm Your Man (1997)	A Matter of Time (1999)

I'm Your Man is the debut studio album by American country music artist Jason Sellers, released in 1997 via BNA Records. Singles released from the album include the title track, "That Does It" and "This Small Divide", all of which charted on the Billboard country charts in 1997. In addition, the song "Can't Help Calling Your Name" was later recorded on Sellers' 1999 album A Matter of Time, from which it was released as a single. "Hole in My Heart" was previously recorded by former NRBQ member Al Anderson on his 1996 album Pay Before You Pump.

== Critical reception ==
Jeff Davis of Country Standard Time gave a mostly unfavorable review, saying that "Sellers is just another artist crafted by the mainstream, trying to make it by imitation" and that Sellers seemed to be emulating Vince Gill on some tracks. His review cited the title track and "I Can't Stay Long" showed a sense of personality.

== Track listing ==
No.	Title	Writer(s)	Length
1.	"I'm Your Man"	Mark D. Sanders, Austin Cunningham	3:38
2.	"Walking in My Sleep"	Gary Burr, Chris Farren, Jason Sellers	3:36
3.	"This Small Divide" (duet with Martina McBride)	Burr, Sellers	3:43
4.	"Can't Help Calling Your Name"	Timothy Matthews, Josh Bernard	4:14
5.	"Hole in My Heart"	Al Anderson, Craig Wiseman	3:46
6.	"That Does It"	Cunningham, Sellers	3:01
7.	"I Can't Stay Long"	Sanders, Tony Martin	2:42
8.	"Divorce My Heart"	Cunningham, Sellers	3:46
9.	"You Better Believe It"	Randy Hardison, Wynn Varble	3:17
10.	"I Need to Remember That"	Robert Byrne, Liz Hengber	2:46
11.	"It's a Man's Job"	Anderson, Sellers	3:01

== Personnel ==
- Jason Sellers – vocals, backing vocals
- John Hobbs – keyboards, Hammond B3 organ
- John Barlow Jarvis – acoustic piano
- Al Anderson – electric guitars
- J. T. Corenflos – electric guitars
- Dann Huff – electric guitars
- Jeff King – electric guitars
- Brent Rowan – electric guitars
- Chris Farren – acoustic guitars, backing vocals
- Pat Flynn – acoustic guitars
- Darrell Scott – acoustic guitars
- Dan Dugmore – steel guitar
- David Hungate – bass guitar
- Leland Sklar – bass guitar
- Glenn Worf – bass guitar
- Greg Morrow – drums, percussion
- Larry Franklin – fiddle
- Nashville String Machine – strings
- Ronn Huff – string arrangements
- Tom McAninch – music copyist
- Melodie Crittenden – backing vocals
- Vince Gill – backing vocals
- Martina McBride – backing vocals, vocals (3)

=== Production ===
- Chris Farren – producer
- Steve Marcantonio – engineer, mixing
- Tom Harding – engineer, overdub engineer
- Alejandro Rodriguez – overdub engineer, assistant engineer
- Chris Davie – assistant engineer, mix assistant
- Tim Waters – assistant engineer, mix assistant
- Sandy Jenkins – assistant engineer, overdub assistant
- Shawn Klaiber – assistant engineer, overdub assistant
- Denny Purcell – mastering at Georgetown Masters (Nashville, Tennessee)
- Susan Eaddy – art direction
- Torne White – design
- Ron Davis – photography
