= Everything I Shouldn't Be Thinking About =

Single by Thompson Square

from the album Just Feels Good
- Released: June 10, 2013
- Genre: Country
- Length: 2:58
- Label: Stoney Creek
- Songwriters: Keifer Thompson; Shawna Thompson; David Lee Murphy; Brett James
- Producer: New Voice Entertainment

Thompson Square singles chronology
"If I Didn't Have You" (2012)	"Everything I Shouldn't Be Thinking About" (2013)	"Testing the Water" (2014)

"Everything I Shouldn't Be Thinking About" is a song recorded by American country music duo Thompson Square. The song is the duo's sixth single release overall, and the second from their second studio album Just Feels Good. Both members of the duo wrote the song with David Lee Murphy and Brett James.

== Content ==
The duet is an exchange between both members of the group (Keifer and Shawna Thompson), in which both of them sing that they are trying to think about their worldly problems, but can only focus on each other at the moment.

== Critical reception ==
Giving it 3.5 out of 5 stars, Billy Dukes of Taste of Country said that "What the song lacks in creativity, the couple more than make up for in delivery." It received 4 out of 5 stars from Bobby Peacock of Roughstock, who said that "the production is very energetic, with a heavy beat and searing guitar solos, and both members of the duo are in as fine voice as ever" but said that it was "lyrically thin".

== Music video ==
The music video was directed by Chris Hicky and premiered in July 2013.

== Chart performance ==
The song has sold 165,000 copies in the US as of April 2014.

Chart (2013–2014)	Peak position
Canada Hot 100 (Billboard)	72
Canada Country (Billboard)	11
US Billboard Hot 100	69
US Country Airplay (Billboard)	4
US Hot Country Songs (Billboard)	15

=== Year-end charts ===
Chart (2013)	Position
US Country Airplay (Billboard)	100

Chart (2014)	Position
US Country Airplay (Billboard)	36
US Hot Country Songs (Billboard)	57
