= Thompson Square (album) =

Studio album by Thompson Square
- Released: February 8, 2011
- Genre: Country
- Length: 41:07
- Label: Stoney Creek
- Producer: New Voice Entertainment

Thompson Square chronology
Thompson Square (2011)	Just Feels Good (2013)

Alternative cover
- Alternate Cover

Singles from Thompson Square
- 1. "Let's Fight" Released: May 3, 2010; 2. "Are You Gonna Kiss Me or Not" Released: July 12, 2010; 3. "I Got You" Released: May 9, 2011; 4. "Glass" Released: January 30, 2012

Professional ratings
Review scores
Source	Rating
AllMusic	3.5/5 stars
Country Weekly	3.5/5 stars
Roughstock	4/5 stars

Thompson Square is the debut studio album by American country music duo Thompson Square. The album was released on February 8, 2011 via Stoney Creek Records, a division of Broken Bow Records. It includes the singles "Let's Fight," "Are You Gonna Kiss Me or Not," "I Got You," and "Glass."

== Content ==
The album was produced by labelmate Jason Aldean's road band, New Voice Entertainment, which consists of Tully Kennedy, Kurt Allison, David Fanning and Rich Redmond. "Let's Fight" was released as the first single on May 3, 2010, and reached number 58 on the Hot Country Songs charts in June 2010 before being withdrawn from radio in favor of "Are You Gonna Kiss Me or Not", which was released on July 12, 2010. It became their first Number One hit on the U.S. Billboard Hot Country Songs charts in April 2011, and was certified 2× Platinum by the RIAA. The album produced two more singles in "I Got You" and "Glass," both of which were Top 20 hits on the Hot Country Songs chart, with the former reaching the Top Ten.

== Reception ==
=== Commercial ===
Thompson Square debuted at number 15 on the U.S. Billboard 200 and number 3 on the U.S. Top Country Albums chart, with first-week sales of 30,028. As of the chart dated July 23, 2011, the album has sold 196,989 copies in the US.

=== Critical ===
Reviewing for Country Weekly, Jessica Phillips gave the album three-and-a-half stars out of five. She called the album a "refreshingly honest glimpse into the highs, lows and idiosyncrasies of a relationship", but criticized the sound by saying that it did not "stray far from the country-rock hybrid." An identical rating came from William Ruhlmann of AllMusic, who said that they "make the most of their romantic pairing" but thought that "many of the arrangements are outright rockers". He also criticized the vocal arrangements for favoring Kiefer. Bobby Peacock of Roughstock rated the album four stars out of five, calling the vocals "energetic, dynamic and, best of all, balanced" in addition to praising their chemistry.

== Track listing ==
No.	Title	Writer(s)	Length
1.	"I Got You"	Paul Jenkins, Jason Sellers, Kiefer Thompson, Shawna Thompson	3:03
2.	"Are You Gonna Kiss Me or Not"	David Lee Murphy, Jim Collins	3:04
3.	"Glass"	Ross Copperman, Jon Nite	3:51
4.	"My Kind of Crazy"	James LeBlanc, K. Thompson, S. Thompson	3:46
5.	"As Bad as It Gets"	Erik Halbig, K. Thompson, S. Thompson	3:27
6.	"Who Loves Who More"	Billy Austin, Jeannine Lasky, Matt Lopez	3:08
7.	"Getaway Car"	Troy Johnson, K. Thompson, S. Thompson	3:32
8.	"Let's Fight"	Westin Davis, K. Thompson, Kip Moore	3:01
9.	"All the Way"	Moore, K. Thompson	3:16
10.	"I Don't Wanna Miss You"	Halbig, K. Thompson, S. Thompson	4:05
11.	"If It Takes All Night"	Bobby Tomberlin, Davis, K. Thompson, S. Thompson	4:10
12.	"One of Those Days"	David Fanning, K. Thompson, S. Thompson	2:36

== Personnel ==
=== Thompson Square ===
- Keifer Thompson - vocals
- Shawna Thompson - vocals

=== Additional Musicians ===
- Kurt Allison - acoustic guitar, electric guitar
- Dan Dugmore - steel guitar
- Glen Duncan - fiddle, mandolin
- Tony Harrell - Hammond B-3 organ, Wurlitzer
- Jizzle Bizzle - electric guitar
- Mike Johnson - steel guitar
- Tully Kennedy - bass guitar
- Steve King - accordion, Hammond B-3 organ
- Rich Redmond - drums, percussion
- Adam Shoenfeld - electric guitar
- Ilya Toshinsky - banjo, bouzouki, acoustic guitar, mandolin

== Chart performance ==
=== Weekly charts ===
Chart (2011)	Peak position
US Billboard 200	15
US Top Country Albums (Billboard)	3
US Independent Albums (Billboard)	3

=== Year-end charts ===
Chart (2011)	Position
US Billboard 200	146
US Top Country Albums (Billboard)	30

=== Singles ===
Year	Single	Peak chart positions			Certifications (sales threshold)
Year	Single	US Country	US	CAN	Certifications (sales threshold)
2010	"Let's Fight"	58	—	—	
2010	"Are You Gonna Kiss Me or Not"	1	32	50	US: 2× Platinum
2011	"I Got You"	8	68	—	
2012	"Glass"	15	84	—	
"—" denotes releases that did not chart

== Certifications ==
Region	Certification	Certified units/sales
United States (RIAA)	Gold	500,000^{‡}
^{‡} Sales+streaming figures based on certification alone.
