= A Matter of Time (Jason Sellers album) =

Studio album by Jason Sellers
- Released: September 28, 1999
- Recorded: 1999
- Studio: Emerald Sound Studios, The Soundshop Studio A, Sound Stage Studios, The Music Mill and The Work Station (Nashville, TN); Sound Kitchen (Franklin, TN); Waltz Time Music (Florence, AL)
- Genre: Country
- Length: 40:30
- Label: BNA
- Producer: Walt Aldridge for Waltz Time Productions

Jason Sellers chronology
I'm Your Man (1997)	A Matter of Time (1999)

A Matter of Time is the second and final studio album by American country music artist Jason Sellers. Its title track was a Top 40 hit for him on the Billboard Hot Country Songs charts in 1999. One day after the album's release, Sellers exited BNA Records' roster.

== Content ==
The track "That's Not Her Picture" was later recorded by John Michael Montgomery on his 2000 album Brand New Me, while "Bad Case of Missing You" would later be recorded by The Oak Ridge Boys on their 2004 album The Journey, from which it was released as a single. "Every Fire" was originally recorded by Shenandoah on its 1994 album In the Vicinity of the Heart. "Golden Ring" is a cover version of the George Jones and Tammy Wynette duet that went to Number One in 1976.

== Critical reception ==
Philip van Vleck of Allmusic gave the album four-and-a-half stars out of five, saying "It's the uptempo tracks that have made this project an effort that supersedes his first album in every aspect."

== Track listing ==
No.	Title	Writer(s)	Length
1.	"A Matter of Time"	Craig Wiseman, Annie Roboff, Jason Sellers	4:18
2.	"What a Lover Is For"	Jimmy Scott, Terry Burns	4:18
3.	"This Thing Called Life"	Austin Cunningham, Sellers	3:28
4.	"Every Fire"	John Scott Sherrill, Cathy Majeski	3:36
5.	"Golden Ring" (duet with Pam Tillis)	Bobby Braddock, Rafe Van Hoy	3:17
6.	"Till I Felt Your Hands"	Sharon Vaughn, Sellers	3:18
7.	"Everybody's Walking"	Bill Anderson, Sellers, Vaughn	3:11
8.	"That's Not Her Picture"	B. Anderson, Gary Burr	3:27
9.	"Bad Case of Missing You"	Al Anderson, Bob DiPiero, Jeffrey Steele	3:54
10.	"If You're Willing"	Stewart Harris, Sellers	3:24
11.	"Can't Help Calling Your Name"	Tim Matthews, Josh Bernard	4:19

== Personnel ==
Musicians

- Jason Sellers – vocals, electric guitars, bass guitar
- Jim "Moose" Brown – acoustic piano, keyboards
- Steve Nathan – acoustic piano, Wurlitzer electric piano, synthesizers, Hammond B3 organ
- J. T. Corenflos – electric guitars
- Jeff King – electric guitars
- Danny Parks – electric guitars
- Brent Rowan – electric guitars
- Pat Flynn – acoustic guitars
- Darrell Scott – acoustic guitars, mandolin
- Steve Hinson – pedal steel guitar, lap steel guitar
- Scotty Sanders – pedal steel guitar
- Walt Aldridge – bouzouki
- Michael Rhodes – bass guitar
- Leland Sklar – bass guitar
- Greg Morrow – drums
- Eddie Bayers – percussion
- Tom Roady – percussion
- Stuart Duncan – fiddle
- Jim Hoke – harmonica

Background vocals

- Jason Sellers (1-7, 9, 10)
- Mary Ann Kennedy (1)
- Jamie O'Neal (1)
- Bekka Bramlett (2, 6, 9)
- Cindy Richardson Walker (2, 9)
- Melodie Crittenden (3, 5, 7)
- Austin Cunningham (3)
- Steven Sellers (3, 5)
- Lee Ann Womack (4)
- Pam Tillis – vocals (5)
- Sonya Isaacs (6, 10)
- Alison Krauss (8)
- Ricky Skaggs (8)

=== Production ===
- Walt Aldridge – producer, additional recording
- Jim DeMain – recording, mixing, additional recording
- John Guess – recording, mixing
- Patrick Murphy – recording assistant, mix assistant
- Tim Waters – recording assistant, additional recording assistant
- Kevin Beamish – additional recording
- Pete Greene – additional recording
- Tom Harding – additional recording
- Clark Schleicher – additional recording
- Herb Tassin – additional recording
- Grant Greene – additional recording assistant
- Tony Green – additional recording assistant
- Jed Hackett – additional recording assistant, mix assistant
- Kelly Schoenfeld – additional recording assistant
- Fred Paragano – digital editing
- Ken Love – mastering at MasterMix (Nashville, Tennessee)
- Burton Brooks – production assistant
- Reese Faw – production assistant
- Ginny Johnson – production assistant
- Susan Eaddy – art direction
- Julie Wanca – design
- Nancy Lee Andrews – photography
- Linda Boykin – hair, make-up
- Jennifer Kemp – stylist
- Moress-Nanas-Hart Management – management
