= If I Didn't Have You (Thompson Square song) =

Single by Thompson Square

from the album Just Feels Good
- Released: October 29, 2012
- Genre: Country
- Length: 3:25
- Label: Stoney Creek
- Songwriters: Keifer Thompson; Shawna Thompson; Jason Sellers; Paul Jenkins
- Producer: New Voice Entertainment

Thompson Square singles chronology
"Glass" (2012)	"If I Didn't Have You" (2012)	"Everything I Shouldn't Be Thinking About" (2013)

"If I Didn't Have You" is a song recorded by American country music duo Thompson Square. It was released in October 2012 as the first single from their album Just Feels Good. The song was written by the duo's Keifer and Shawna Thompson with Jason Sellers and Paul Jenkins.

== Critical reception ==
Billy Dukes of Taste of Country gave the song four stars out of five, writing that "what this duo continues to do better than any man/woman pairing in Nashville is find that sweet spot between genuine and too real." Matt Bjorke of Roughstock also gave the song four stars out of five, saying that "the melody and production are modern in approach but once you hear Shawna Thompson['s] lead vocal, it's not hard to know that this is both a country song and something that's not of the 'also-ran' category."

== Music video ==
The music video was directed by Brian Lazzaro and premiered in February 2013.

The videos depicts Keifer and Shawna going for a night out when their car gets struck by a semi, Shawna sustains major injuries and is asleep at the hospital recovering from her injuries while Keifer stays by her side, it also cuts into scenes of the couple singing together and Shawna's spirit singing with Keifer while she is still asleep recovering from her injuries. At the end of the video, Shawna wakes up and the duo embrace in a kiss.

== Chart performance ==
"If I Didn't Have You" debuted at number 26 on the U.S. Billboard Hot Country Songs chart for the week of November 17, 2012. It also debuted at number 98 on the U.S. Billboard Hot 100 chart for the week of November 17, 2012. It also debuted at number 89 on the Canadian Hot 100 chart for the week of April 13, 2013. In May 2013, it became the duo's second number one.

Chart (2012–2013)	Peak position
Canada Hot 100 (Billboard)	70
Canada Country (Billboard)	14
US Billboard Hot 100	49
US Country Airplay (Billboard)	1
US Hot Country Songs (Billboard)	7

=== Year-end charts ===
Chart (2013)	Position
US Country Airplay (Billboard)	26
US Hot Country Songs (Billboard)	33

== Certifications ==
Region	Certification	Certified units/sales
United States (RIAA)	Gold	500,000^{‡}
^{‡} Sales+streaming figures based on certification alone.
