= Glass (Thompson Square song) =

Single by Thompson Square

from the album Thompson Square
- Released: January 30, 2012
- Genre: Country
- Length: 3:52
- Label: Stoney Creek
- Songwriter(s): Ross Copperman; Jon Nite
- Producer(s): New Voice Entertainment

Thompson Square singles chronology
"I Got You" (2011)	"Glass" (2012)	"If I Didn't Have You" (2012)

"Glass" is a song recorded by American country music duo Thompson Square. It was released in January 2012 as the fourth single from their self-titled debut album. The song was written by Ross Copperman and Jon Nite.

== Critical reception ==
Billy Dukes of Taste of Country gave the song four and a half stars out of five, writing that "the lyrics are merely better than average, but from Mrs. Thompson’s lips they float through the air like a lonely snowflake, begging for safety and acceptance that is too easy to grant."

== Music videos ==
Two music videos were produced for the song. The first, directed by Roman White, premiered in February 2012. A second music video directed by Wes Edwards premiered in April 2012.

== Chart performance ==
"Glass" debuted at number 60 on the U.S. Billboard Hot Country Songs chart for the week of February 11, 2012. It also debuted at number 100 on the U.S. Billboard Hot 100 chart for the week of June 23, 2012.

Chart (2012)	Peak position
Canada Country (Billboard)	45
US Billboard Hot 100	84
US Hot Country Songs (Billboard)	15

=== Year-end charts ===
Chart (2012)	Position
US Country Songs (Billboard)	62
