= Trans Am (Thompson Square song) =

Single by Thompson Square
- Released: March 23, 2015
- Genre: Country rock
- Length: 2:55
- Label: Stoney Creek
- Songwriters: Nathan Chapman; Keifer Thompson; Shawna Thompson
- Producer: New Voice Entertainment

Thompson Square singles chronology
"I Can't Outrun You" (2014)	"Trans Am" (2015)	"You Make It Look So Good" (2016)

"Trans Am" is a song co-written and recorded by country music duo Thompson Square. The song was released in March 2015 as the intended first single from their third studio album, though it ultimately went unreleased. Both members of the duo wrote the song with Nathan Chapman.

== Critical reception ==
An uncredited Taste of Country review stated that "There’s no hidden message or deeper meaning to Thompson Square’s “Trans Am.” While there’s a touch of innuendo, the rocker is just a good, old-fashioned car song."

== Music video ==
The music video was directed by Wes Edwards and premiered in June 2015.

== Chart performance ==
Chart (2015)	Peak position
US Country Airplay (Billboard)	44
