= I Got You (Thompson Square song) =

Single by Thompson Square

from the album Thompson Square
- Released: May 9, 2011
- Genre: Country
- Length: 3:08
- Label: Stoney Creek
- Songwriter(s): Kiefer Thompson; Shawna Thompson; Jason Sellers; Paul Jenkins
- Producer(s): New Voice Entertainment

Thompson Square singles chronology
"Are You Gonna Kiss Me or Not" (2010)	"I Got You" (2011)	"Glass" (2012)

Music video
- "I Got You" at CMT.com

"I Got You" is a song co-written and recorded by American country music duo Thompson Square. It was released in May 2011 as the third single from their self-titled debut album.

== Content ==
Written by the duo along with Jason Sellers and Paul Jenkins, "I Got You" is a lyric about two lovers who need each other, comparing themselves to various objects that need others in order to work.

== Critical reception ==
William Ruhlmann of Allmusic thought that it was a "variation" on the theme of "a love story from initial smooch through exchanged vows" established by "Are You Gonna Kiss Me or Not".

== Music video ==
The music video, shot by Wes Edwards over the course of two days, features the duo wearing several different costumes.

== Chart performance ==
Chart (2011–2012)	Peak position
Canada Country (Billboard)	12
US Billboard Hot 100	68
US Hot Country Songs (Billboard)	8

=== Year-end charts ===
Chart (2011)	Position
US Country Songs (Billboard)	36

Chart (2012)	Position
US Country Songs (Billboard)	99
