= Why Wait (song) =

Single by Rascal Flatts

from the album Nothing Like This
- Released: August 2, 2010
- Recorded: 2010
- Genre: Country
- Length: 3:46
- Label: Big Machine
- Songwriters: Neil Thrasher; Tom Shapiro; Jimmy Yeary
- Producers: Dann Huff; Rascal Flatts

Rascal Flatts singles chronology
"Unstoppable" (2010)	"Why Wait" (2010)	"I Won't Let Go" (2011)

"Why Wait" is a song written by Neil Thrasher, Tom Shapiro, and Jimmy Yeary and recorded by American country music band Rascal Flatts. It was released in August 2010 as the first single from the band's 2010 album Nothing Like This. It is also their first single from Big Machine Records.

== Content ==
The protagonist attempts to convince his lover to run off to Las Vegas with him to get married.

== Music video ==
The music video, directed by William Zabka, was shot in Las Vegas, Nevada, following a story reminiscent of the comedy film The Hangover. David Arquette plays the man in the video who proposes to his girlfriend. Rick Harrison, owner of the Gold & Silver Pawn Shop and star of the History Channel original show Pawn Stars, makes a cameo appearance in the video when Rascal Flatts and Arquette stop at the pawn shop to buy an engagement ring. Also in the video are cameos by Ron White, Carrot Top, Victoria Justice, Wayne Newton, and Penn and Teller. The video received nominations for Group Video and Video of the Year at the 2011 CMT Music Awards.

== Critical reception ==
Matt Bjorke of Roughstock gave the song four stars out of five, saying that the lyrics "may be 'cheesy' to some, but it fits right where we'd expect a Rascal Flatts song to go." Tara Seetharam gave the song a B+ grade, describing it as "a tasteful, vintage-Flatts track marked by an infectious rush of joy." She positively commented on the production, lyrics, and LeVox's vocals, stating that "the song gets everything right." Ben Foster of "The 1-to-10 Country Music Review" gave it ten stars out of ten, saying, "this is the best that the boys' voices have sounded in years and their signature three-part harmonies are fully intact and sounding great."

== Chart performance ==
"Why Wait" debuted at No. 34 on the U.S. Billboard Hot Country Songs chart for the week of August 14, 2010. For the week of December 18, 2010, the song became the group's eleventh number one hit on the chart.

Chart (2010–2011)	Peak position
US Hot Country Songs (Billboard)	1
US Billboard Hot 100	48
Canada Hot 100 (Billboard)	60

=== Year-end charts ===
Chart (2010)	Position
US Country Songs (Billboard)	47

Chart (2011)	Position
US Country Songs (Billboard)	66
