= As She's Walking Away =

Single by Zac Brown Band featuring Alan Jackson

from the album You Get What You Give and 34 Number Ones
- Released: August 23, 2010
- Recorded: 2010
- Genre: Country
- Length: 3:44
- Label: Atlantic; Southern Ground
- Songwriters: Zac Brown; Wyatt Durrette
- Producers: Zac Brown; Keith Stegall

Zac Brown Band singles chronology
"This Song's for You" (2010)	"As She's Walking Away" (2010)	"Colder Weather" (2010)

Alan Jackson singles chronology
"Hard Hat and a Hammer" (2010)	"As She's Walking Away" (2010)	"Ring of Fire" (2010)

"As She's Walking Away" is a song by American country music group Zac Brown Band. Written by lead singer Zac Brown, along with Wyatt Durrette, it features guest vocals from veteran country singer Alan Jackson. The song is the sixth single release by the band, and the first from the album You Get What You Give. It won the Grammy Award for Best Country Collaboration with Vocals at the 53rd Grammy Awards, and is the second Grammy for both the band and Jackson overall.

== Release history ==
The song is the first release from the band's album You Get What You Give, which was released on September 21. John Driskell Hopkins, who plays bass guitar in the band, suggested that Jackson be included as a duet partner on it, because he thought that "it would get a great, different kind of fan base for us." Both Zac Brown Band and Jackson are produced by Keith Stegall. On August 24, 2010, an exclusive CD single was released at Target featuring "As She's Walking Away" along with the studio version of "Colder Weather" for the first time.

== Background and writing ==
Co-writer Wyatt Durrette told The Boot that the idea came when he and Brown went to a bar in Orlando, Florida to watch a UFC fight. Durrette said that while they were watching the fight a guy and a girl walked in and all night she stared at him. Durrette said that she was "a beautiful girl, but she had her boyfriend with her, so I obviously wasn't going to say or do anything. We kind of spoke all night from across the room, but didn't say anything to each other." Durrette said that Brown had the idea of bringing the wise man into it and turning it into the older man at the bar who's a much wiser man, giving you advice.

== Personnel ==
Adapted from the liner notes for Jackson’s greatest hits album 34 Number Ones.

- Zac Brown – lead vocals, acoustic guitar, producer
- Jimmy De Martini – backing vocals, fiddle
- Clay Cook – backing vocals, electric guitar
- John Driskell Hopkins – backing vocals, bass guitar
- Coy Bowles – Hammond B-3 organ
- Chris Fryar – drums
- Alan Jackson – lead vocals
- Keith Stegall — producer

== Critical reception ==
The song received critical acclaim. C.M. Wilcox of The 9513 gave the song a thumbs-up, praising the song's "driving, organic arrangement" as well as the interplay between Brown and Jackson. On the AOL Radio Blog, Amar Toor also described Brown's and Jackson's vocals favorably. A positive review also came from Michael Menachem of Billboard, who said that the song had a "heartwarming" sound.

== Music video ==
Darren Doane directed the song's music video. The inside scenes of the bar were filmed in Dixie Tavern in Marietta, Georgia. The outside scenes of the bar were filmed at The Trap located at 2822 East Avenue I, Lancaster, California.

== Chart performance ==
In the week of its release, "As She's Walking Away" debuted at number 32 on the Hot Country Songs charts, as well as number 77 on the Billboard Hot 100. It later debuted at 81 on the Canadian Hot 100 chart for the week of October 9, 2010. On the country chart dated November 20, 2010, "As She's Walking Away" reached Number One, becoming the Zac Brown Band's fourth consecutive Number One single (and their fifth overall), and Jackson's twenty-sixth and final number one hit to date.

Chart (2010)	Peak position
US Hot Country Songs (Billboard)	1
US Billboard Hot 100	32
Canada Country (Billboard)	1
Canada Hot 100 (Billboard)	49

=== Year-end charts ===
Chart (2010)	Position
US Country Songs (Billboard)	46

Chart (2011)	Position
US Country Songs (Billboard)	76

== Certifications ==
Region	Certification	Certified units/sales
United States (RIAA)	Platinum	1,000,000^{‡}
^{‡} Sales+streaming figures based on certification alone.
