= Carter's Chord =

American country music group

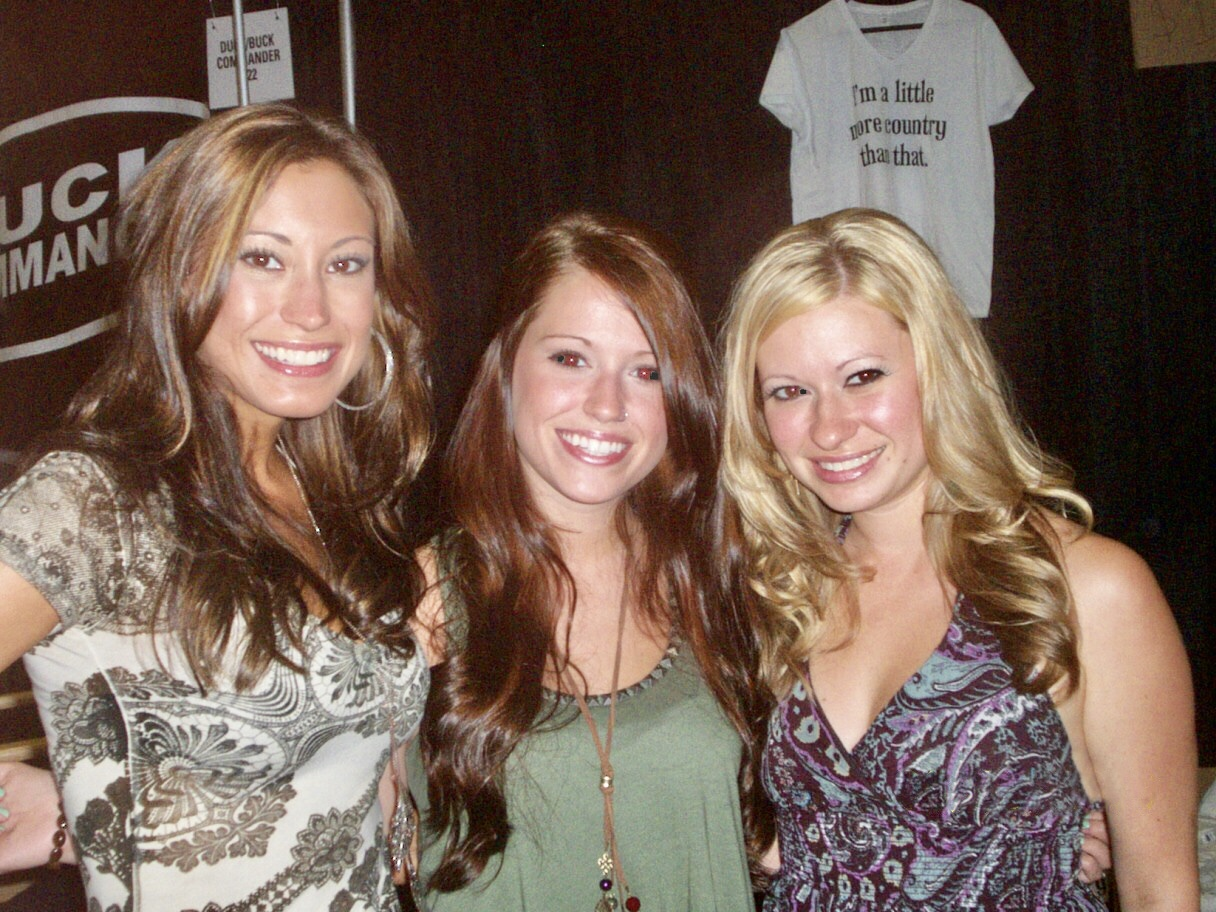
- Carter's Chord, June 2010

Background information
- Origin: Nashville, Tennessee, U.S.
- Genres: Country
- Years active: 2006–2011
- Labels: Show Dog-Universal Music
- Past members: Becky Scott; Emily Fortney; Joanna Ott
- Website: http://www.carterschord.com/

Carter's Chord was an American country music group composed of sisters Becky Scott, Emily Fortney, and Joanna Ott, all of whom are singer-songwriters and vocalists. They are also the three daughters of Barny and Carter Roberston, both of whom played in Waylon Jennings' road band The Waylors in the 1970s; Emily Fortney is also married to Marc "Butter" Fortney of Trailer Choir, another country music group.

After several years of performing locally, the trio was signed in 2006 to Show Dog Nashville (now Show Dog-Universal Music), a record label owned by country singer Toby Keith. Their debut single, "Young Love", reached the Billboard Hot Country Songs charts, as did its followup "Different Breed." Both are included on the group's debut album, which was issued to digital retailers in June 2008.

== Biography ==
Becky, Emily, and Joanna Robertson were raised in a musically inclined household in southern California. Their parents—keyboardist and producer Barny Robertson, and vocalist Carter Robertson—were both members of Waylon Jennings' road band The Waylors in the 1970s and later in Waymore Blues Band in the last years of his life. Having performed together at their home from an early age, the three sisters made their recording debut on Jennings' 1998 album Cowboys, Sisters, Rascals & Dirt, which their father produced. The sisters would also charge for the shows that they performed at home; among the artists who paid to see them at their house included Jennings and members of The Crickets.

Later on, the three sisters moved to Nashville, Tennessee, where they began honing their singing and songwriting skills. Eventually, they were discovered by Toby Keith; after the trio held a showcase on February 14, 2006, Keith signed them to his own Show Dog Nashville label. The group's first release was a recording of the Christmas standard "O come, O come, Emmanuel", which was placed into rotation on the television network CMT. They also recorded the song "Song of Blue" on the soundtrack to the 2008 film Beer for My Horses, in which Keith starred.

"Young Love", their debut single, was released to radio in January 2008, and entered the Billboard Hot Country Songs charts. A second single, "Different Breed", was released to radio in April 2008. In addition, Carter's Chord released its debut album to digital retailers in June 2008.

"You Knock Me Out" was released to radio in January 2010 as the trio's third single, but it failed to chart. Their fourth single, "A Little Less Comfortable", was released a year later in January 2011. This song also failed to chart.

== Personal lives ==
Joanna married Mark Ott in mid-2009. Emily married Marc "Butter" Fortney of Trailer Choir, another act on the Show Dog-Universal label, in September 2010. Becky got engaged to longtime boyfriend, music producer Jeremiah Scott on August 23, 2011, and married him on April 21, 2012.

In March 2014, Ott released a solo EP called Machinery.

== Discography ==
=== Extended plays ===
Title	Album details	Peak chart positions	
Title	Album details	US Country	US Heat
Carter's Chord	Release date: June 17, 2008; Label: Show Dog Nashville	59	—
Wild Together	Release date: May 24, 2011; Label: Show Dog-Universal Music	48	13
"—" denotes releases that did not chart

=== Singles ===
Year	Single	Peak positions	Album
Year	Single	US Country	Album
2008	"Young Love"	49	Carter's Chord
2008	"Different Breed"	52	Carter's Chord
2010	"You Knock Me Out"	—	—N/a
2011	"A Little Less Comfortable"	—	Wild Together
"—" denotes releases that did not chart

=== Music videos ===
Year	Video	Director
2008	"Different Breed"	Ryan Stadlman
2011	"A Little Less Comfortable"	Kristin Barlowe
2012	"Love a Little Bigger"	Chris Hicky
