= Wild Together =

EP by Carter's Chord
- Released: May 24, 2011
- Genre: Country
- Length: 21:45
- Label: Show Dog-Universal Music
- Producer: Toby Keith; Mark Wright

Carter's Chord chronology
| Carter's Chord (2008) | Wild Together (2011) |

Singles from Wild Together
- 1. "A Little Less Comfortable" Released: January 31, 2011

Professional ratings
Review scores
| Source | Rating |
|---|---|
| Allmusic | 3/5 stars |

Wild Together is an extended play by American country music group Carter's Chord. It was released on May 24, 2011, by Show Dog-Universal Music as the follow-up to Carter Chord's 2008 debut album, Carter's Chord.

== Track listing ==
| No. | Title | Writer(s) | Length |
|---|---|---|---|
| 1. | "Wild Together" | Andrew Dorff, Emily Robertson, Joanna Robertson | 3:56 |
| 2. | "I Can Break Hearts Too" | E. Robertson, Brice Long, Becky Robertson, J. Robertson | 3:24 |
| 3. | "A Little Less Comfortable" | E. Robertson, J. Robertson, Phillip White | 3:27 |
| 4. | "Simple Little Screwed Up Life" | E. Robertson, J. Robertson, Phillip White | 3:37 |
| 5. | "We Ain't Makin' Love" | B. Robertson | 3:48 |
| 6. | "Love a Little Bigger" | E. Robertson | 3:23 |
| Total length: | | | 21:45 |

== Personnel ==
Carter's Chord

- Becky Robertson - vocals
- Emily Robertson - vocals
- Joanna Robertson - vocals

Additional Musicians

- Tom Bukovac - electric guitar
- Chad Cromwell - drums
- Eric Darken - percussion
- Kevin "Swine" Grantt - bass guitar, tic tac bass
- Kenny Greenburg - electric guitar
- Aubrey Haynie - fiddle
- Jim Hoke - acoustic guitar, lap steel guitar
- Phil Madiera - keyboards, piano
- Steve Nathan - keyboards, piano
- Michael Rhodes - bass guitar
- Ilya Toshinsky - banjo, bouzouki, dobro, acoustic guitar
- Jonathan Yudkin - fiddle

== Chart performance ==
| Chart (2011) | Peak position |
|---|---|
| U.S. Billboard Top Country Albums | 48 |
| U.S. Billboard Top Heatseekers | 12 |
