= Easy (Rascal Flatts song) =

Single by Rascal Flatts featuring Natasha Bedingfield

from the album Nothing Like This and Strip Me (Deluxe)
- Released: June 27, 2011
- Genre: Country pop
- Length: 3:38 (album version); 3:33 (radio edit)
- Label: Big Machine
- Songwriters: Katrina Elam; Michael Mobley
- Producers: Dann Huff; Rascal Flatts

Rascal Flatts singles chronology
"I Won't Let Go" (2010)	"Easy" (2011)	"Banjo" (2012)

Natasha Bedingfield singles chronology
"Jet Lag" (2011)	"Easy" (2011)	"As Long As We Got Love" (2011)

"Easy" is a song written by Katrina Elam and Michael Mobley and recorded by the American country music group Rascal Flatts as a duet with British pop singer Natasha Bedingfield. It was released in June 2011 as the third and final single from Rascal Flatts' album Nothing Like This. It became Rascal Flatts' fifth AC Top 20 hit. As of the chart dated July 21, 2012, the song has sold 917,000 copies in the US.

== Content ==
"Easy" is a midtempo ballad in 6/8 time signature with a vocal range from C♯_{3} to C_{5}. The song begins in C♯ minor and modulates up to E minor halfway through the second verse.

== Critical reception ==
Jessica Phillips of Country Weekly called the song a "sizzling duet". Stephen Thomas Erlewine of Allmusic was less favorable, calling it a "questionable stab at pop radio crossover". Ben Foster of Country Universe gave the song a B, saying that the lyrics are simple, but effective at telling the story of two ex-lovers who are in denial of the strong feelings they still harbor for one another. Billy Dukes of Taste of Country gave the song four stars out of five, calling it "a daring collaboration and fits right into the Rascal Flatts wheelhouse."

The song was nominated for Video of the Year at the 2012 CMT Music Awards.

== Music video ==
The music video for the song premiered on CMT.com on July 1, 2011.

== Charts ==
Chart (2011–2012)	Peak position
US Billboard Hot 100	43
US Adult Contemporary (Billboard)	20
US Hot Country Songs (Billboard)	3

=== Year-end charts ===
Chart (2011)	Position
US Country Songs (Billboard)	54

Chart (2012)	Position
US Country Songs (Billboard)	57

== Certifications ==
Region	Certification	Certified units/sales
United States (RIAA)	Platinum	1,000,000^{^}
^{^} Shipments figures based on certification alone.
