= You Get What You Give (album) =

Studio album by Zac Brown Band
- Released: September 21, 2010
- Recorded: 2009–2010
- Studios: 800 East Studios, Atlanta, GA; After 7 Studios, Mechanicsburg, PA; FLCC Studios, Canandaigua, NY; Loud Recording Studios, Nashville, TN; Shrimpboat Sound, Key West, FL; The Sound Station; Wedgewood Sound
- Genres: Country; bluegrass; jam band
- Length: 60:39
- Labels: Atlantic; Bigger Picture; Southern Ground
- Producers: Zac Brown; Keith Stegall

Zac Brown Band chronology
The Foundation (2008)	You Get What You Give (2010)	Uncaged (2012)

Singles from You Get What You Give
- 1. "As She's Walking Away" Released: August 23, 2010; 2. "Colder Weather" Released: December 20, 2010; 3. "Knee Deep" Released: May 9, 2011; 4. "Keep Me in Mind" Released: August 22, 2011; 5. "No Hurry" Released: January 16, 2012

You Get What You Give is the second studio album by American country music group Zac Brown Band. It was released on September 21, 2010. As of September 2015, the album has sold 1.9 million copies in the United States.

== Content ==
Zac Brown wrote or co-wrote all songs on the album. The tracks "Let It Go," "Who Knows," "Whiskey's Gone," "Colder Weather," and "Make This Day" were previously live versions on their album Pass the Jar. The live versions of "Let It Go" and "Martin" were previously bonus tracks on the deluxe edition of their album The Foundation. The live version of "Whiskey's Gone" also appeared on the soundtrack to True Blood, in 2008. "As She's Walking Away" and "Knee Deep" contain guest vocals from Alan Jackson and Jimmy Buffett respectively.

== Singles ==
"As She's Walking Away," a duet with Alan Jackson, was released as the first single on August 23, 2010. It debuted at #32 on the US Billboard Hot Country Songs charts for the week of August 28, 2010. "Colder Weather" the album's second single was released to country radio on December 20, 2010. It charted as number-one on country radio on April 16, 2011 and stayed at the top for 2 weeks. It has since sold 1 million copies in digital sales. "Knee Deep" was released as the third single from the album. It charted as number-one on country radio on August 13, 2011, taking 16 weeks to reach the top. "Keep Me In Mind" was released as a digital single on September 13, 2010, a week prior to the album's release, and was later released as the 4th single from the album to country radio in August 2011.

== Critical reception ==
Professional ratings
Review scores
Source	Rating
AbsolutePunk	(79%)
Allmusic	4/5 stars
Associated Press	(favorable)
The Badger Herald	5/5 stars
The Boston Globe	(mixed)
Country Weekly	4.5/5 stars
Entertainment Weekly	(B)
The Hartford Courant	(favorable)
Roughstock	4/5 stars
Slant Magazine	4/5 stars

Upon its release, You Get What You Give received generally positive reviews from most music critics. At Metacritic, which assigns a normalized rating out of 100 to reviews from mainstream critics, the album received an average score of 80, based on 6 reviews, which indicates "generally favorable reviews".

Samantha Stepp with The Badger Herald gave it a perfect rating, calling it a "masterpiece", and saying that album "offers a soulful voice, pleasant melodies, honest lyrics and that classic fiddle-and-steel guitar combo that has come to define pure country." Steve Leggett with Allmusic called it "better and more consistent album" in comparison to The Foundation. Jessica Phillips with Country Weekly gave it a near perfect rating, complimenting their capability to "routinely and capably flits between genres, often in the same song." Eric R. Danton with The Hartford Courant called it "a solid, strong outing" and commented saying "The circuitous path to success has done the band good: it's given Brown and company time enough to develop a winsome country-rock style without undue meddling from the major-label mediocracy, and it shows on You Get What You Give".

Ron Harris with the Associated Press referred to it as "one of the best country albums of the year" and called it "country-plus". Jonathan Keefe with Slant Magazine gave it four out of five stars, and called it "one of the year's strongest country records", and referred to the band as "easily the most accomplished band in contemporary country since the Dixie Chicks still counted."

Whitney Pastorek with Entertainment Weekly gave it a 'B' rating, and criticized the album's lyrics, saying they "too often pander to a certain good-time demographic." Steve Morse with The Boston Globe gave a mixed review, saying many of the songs on the album "fall into the sugary commercial country column". Gregory Robson with AbsolutePunk gave it a '79%' rating, saying it was "comfortable and corny; that's not to say that the album is weak, in fact it's rather strong, but the saccharine nature of the lyrics and the tepid arrangements do leave a bit to be desired."

== Commercial performance ==
It debuted at number one on the U.S. Billboard 200, as well as the U.S. Billboard Top Country Albums, selling 153,000 copies, replacing Linkin Park’s A Thousand Suns as the number one album and beating out Maroon 5's Hands All Over, which sold 142,000 copies. In its second week of release, it fell to number three on the Billboard 200, selling 70,000 copies. In its third week of release, it fell to number five, selling 43,000 copies. In its fourth week of release, it fell to number eight, selling 34,000 copies. In its fifth week of release, the album dropped to number fourteen, selling 25,873 copies. As of September 2015, the album has sold 1.9 million copies in the United States.

== Track listing ==
No.	Title	Writer(s)	Length
1.	"Let It Go"	Zac Brown; Wyatt Durrette	4:37
2.	"Knee Deep" (featuring Jimmy Buffett)	Brown; Durrette; Coy Bowles; Jeffrey Steele	3:23
3.	"No Hurry"	Brown; Durrette; James Otto	3:46
4.	"I Play the Road"	Brown; Durrette; John Driskell Hopkins	4:19
5.	"Cold Hearted"	Brown; Nic Cowan	3:47
6.	"Whiskey's Gone"	Brown; Durrette	2:46
7.	"Quiet Your Mind"	Brown; Durrette	3:40
8.	"Colder Weather"	Brown; Durrette; Bowles; Levi Lowrey	4:33
9.	"Settle Me Down"	Brown; Durrette; Bowles	3:21
10.	"As She's Walking Away" (featuring Alan Jackson)	Brown; Durrette	3:43
11.	"Keep Me in Mind"	Brown; Durrette; Cowan	3:34
12.	"Who Knows"	Brown; Joel Williams	10:02
13.	"Martin"	Brown	5:06
14.	"Make This Day"	Brown; Durrette; Cowan	4:02
Total length:			60:39

iTunes deluxe edition bonus tracks
No.	Title	Writer(s)	Length
15.	"Oh My Sweet Carolina" (live)	Ryan Adams	4:41
16.	"Nothing"	Brown; Durrette	4:25
17.	"Every Little Bit" (live)	Brown; Durrette	4:22
18.	"Smoke Rise"	Clay Cook	3:26
Total length:			77:33

You Get What You Give [+Video] [+Digital Booklet]
No.	Title	Writer(s)	Length
15.	"Father and Son" (Cat Stevens Cover)	Cat Stevens	3:58
Total length:			64:37

== Personnel ==
Zac Brown Band

- Zac Brown – lead vocals, acoustic guitar
- Jimmy de Martini – harmony and backing vocals, fiddle, violin
- Coy Bowles – electric guitar, Hammond organ
- Clay Cook – harmony and backing vocals, electric guitar, Hammond organ, pedal steel guitar, piano, mandolin
- John Driskell Hopkins – harmony and backing vocals, bass guitar
- Chris Fryar – drums

Additional musicians

- Jimmy Buffett – duet vocals on "Knee Deep"
- Donald Dunlavey – electric guitar on "I Play The Road"
- Alan Jackson – duet vocals on "As She's Walking Away"
- Tony Rice – acoustic guitar on "Martin"

Technical

- Thomas R. Bledsoe — photography
- Zac Brown – producer
- Jason Campbell – production Coordination
- Clay Cook – engineer
- Ruffin Gillican – design
- John Driskell Hopkins – engineer
- John Kelton – engineer, mixing
- Steve Lowrey – engineer
- Alex Martinez – photography
- Mister Cartoon – cover calligraphy
- Gregg Nadel – A&R
- Matt Rovey – engineer
- Jeffrey Skillings – photography
- Keith Stegall – producer
- Hank Williams – mastering

== Charts ==
=== Weekly charts ===
Chart (2010)	Peak position
Australian Country Albums	20
Canadian Albums (Billboard)	12
US Billboard 200	1
US Top Country Albums (Billboard)	1

=== Year-end charts ===
Chart (2010)	Position
US Billboard 200	73
US Top Country Albums (Billboard)	11
Chart (2011)	Position
US Billboard 200	23
US Top Country Albums (Billboard)	5
Chart (2012)	Position
US Billboard 200	75
US Top Country Albums (Billboard)	20

=== Decade-end charts ===
Chart (2010–2019)	Position
US Billboard 200	105

== Certifications ==
Region	Certification	Certified units/sales
Canada (Music Canada)	Gold	40,000^{^}
United States (RIAA)	3× Platinum	3,000,000^{‡}
^{^} Shipments figures based on certification alone.^{‡} Sales+streaming figures based on certification alone.
