= I Won't Let Go (Rascal Flatts song) =

Single by Rascal Flatts

from the album Nothing Like This
- Released: January 10, 2011
- Recorded: 2010
- Genre: Country
- Length: 3:47
- Label: Big Machine
- Songwriters: Steve Robson; Jason Sellers
- Producers: Dann Huff; Rascal Flatts

Rascal Flatts singles chronology
"Why Wait" (2010)	"I Won't Let Go" (2011)	"Easy" (2011)

"I Won't Let Go" is a song written by Steve Robson and Jason Sellers and recorded by American country music group Rascal Flatts. It was released in January 2011 as the second single from the band's seventh studio album, Nothing Like This as well as their 28th single overall. The song received positive reviews from critics who praised Gary LeVox's vocal delivery. "I Won't Let Go" peaked at number 2 on the Billboard Hot Country Songs chart, number one on the Canadian country charts and number 31 on the Hot 100. The song was certified double Platinum by the Recording Industry Association of America (RIAA), denoting sales of over two million units in the country. It also managed to chart in Australia and Canada, peaking at numbers 39 and 68 respectively. The accompanying music video for the song was directed by Deaton-Flanigen Productions and is footage of a live performance.

== Content and writing ==
Jason Sellers and Steve Robson wrote the song together. Robson had begun the song already when he and Sellers got together to write it. Sellers told Country Weekly that he thought Robson's existing lyrics were "inspired", and thought that he would write a song with an "uplifting lyric". He said they intentionally did not define the song's character, so that the message could be applicable in various situations: "This could be something you'd say to someone in the family that's a soldier, fighting overseas… or to your mom, dad, wife or husband[…] I felt it could also be God saying it to someone."

== Critical reception ==
Professional ratings
Review scores
Source	Rating
The 9513	(Thumbs Up)
Roughstock	4/5 stars
The 1-to-10 Country Music Review	5/10 stars

Michael McCall of Associated Press praised the song in his review of the album, saying that it "show[ed] a new maturity" and "showcases Gary LeVox's tenor." Writing for The 9513, C.M. Wilcox gave the song a "thumbs up". He thought that the lyrics were vague but said that the song was "beautifully executed", also praising Gary LeVox's voice. Matt Bjorke of Roughstock gave it four stars out of five, saying, "this ‘power ballad’ showcases off the better parts of Gary LeVox's singing style as he sings the melody of the lyric in a soft, tender tenor that is often the best pocket of his voice and while he does some vocal runs throughout the song, he sings this song in a tone that suits him the best." Ben Foster of "The 1-to-10 Country Music Review" gave it five stars out of ten, saying, "their performance is solid, and the harmonies are there, so "I Won't Let Go" is easy on the ears."

== Music video ==
The music video was directed by Deaton-Flanigen Productions and premiered in early 2011. It is footage of a live performance.

== Appearances in popular culture ==
In 2018, the World Wide Fund for Nature (WWF) use the song in a TV commercial focused on the plight of the Snow leopard.

== Charts ==
=== Weekly charts ===
Chart (2011)	Peak position
Australia (ARIA)	68
US Hot Country Songs (Billboard)	2
Canada Country (Billboard)	1
US Billboard Hot 100	31
Canada Hot 100 (Billboard)	39

=== Year-end charts ===
Chart (2011)	Position
US Country Songs (Billboard)	28
US Country Digital Songs (Billboard)	20
US Ringtones (Billboard)	50

== Certifications ==
Region	Certification	Certified units/sales
United States (RIAA)	2× Platinum	2,000,000^{‡}
^{‡} Sales+streaming figures based on certification alone.
