= Keep Me in Mind (Zac Brown Band song) =

Single by Zac Brown Band

from the album You Get What You Give
- Released: August 22, 2011
- Genre: Country; Jam band
- Length: 3:34
- Label: Atlantic; Bigger Picture Music Group; Southern Ground
- Songwriters: Zac Brown; Wyatt Durrette; Nic Cowan
- Producers: Zac Brown; Keith Stegall

Zac Brown Band singles chronology
"Knee Deep" (2011)	"Keep Me in Mind" (2011)	"No Hurry" (2012)

"Keep Me in Mind" is a song recorded by American country music group Zac Brown Band. It was released in August 2011 as the fourth single from the Zac Brown Band's second major-label album, 2010's You Get What You Give. The song was written by lead singer Zac Brown, along with Wyatt Durrette and Nic Cowan.

== Composition ==
The main riff, which is repeated throughout the entire first verse.

In the song, the narrator asks that another woman "keep [him] in mind" should she be dissatisfied with her lover. The song is in the key of F♯ major, with the guitars in E♭ tuning. During the entire first verse, a two-measure guitar riff is repeated. The chorus follows the pattern B-F♯-B-F♯-D♯m-B-C♯-F♯ before the tempo slows on the bridge. During this part of the song, piano and a string section are heard, following the pattern D♯m-F♯-D♯m-B-F♯ twice before returning to the original tempo and repeating the chorus.

== Critical reception ==
Billy Dukes of Taste of Country gave the song four and a half stars out of five, calling it "fun" and "funky" while adding that the only negative thing that can be said is that it's "more jam band than straight-up country music." Marc Erickson of Roughstock also described the song "jam-band like" and "great sounding", giving it four stars out of five. Dan Milliken of Country Universe gave the song a B− grade, saying that the song "offers some cool musical changes to pad out its slight theme [but] the band moves through everything so smoothly that that padding also starts to seem slight." He goes on to say that "even when they transition into a Luther Vandross–R&B groove – audacious on paper – they do it with so little drama that you hardly notice it."

== Music video ==
The music video, directed by Fenton Williams, premiered on CMT during their Big New Music Weekend on October 14, 2011. It was filmed during a live performance at Red Rocks Amphitheatre in Denver, Colorado. It shows the group on their tour bus, in concert, and shots of the red rocks. It also uses a live version of the song.

== Chart performance ==
"Keep Me in Mind" debuted at number 59 on the U.S. Billboard Hot Country Songs chart for the week of September 3, 2011.

=== Weekly charts ===
Chart (2011–2012)	Peak position
Canada Country (Billboard)	1
Canada Hot 100 (Billboard)	64
US Hot Country Songs (Billboard)	1
US Billboard Hot 100	35

=== Year-end charts ===
Chart (2011)	Position
US Country Songs (Billboard)	72

Chart (2012)	Position
US Country Songs (Billboard)	38

=== Decade-end charts ===
Chart (2010–2019)	Position
US Hot Country Songs (Billboard)	27

== Certifications ==
Region	Certification	Certified units/sales
United States (RIAA)	Platinum	1,000,000^{‡}
^{‡} Sales+streaming figures based on certification alone.
