= Jason Sellers =

American musician (born 1971)

- Born: Jason Dale Sellers; March 4, 1971 (age 55)
- Origin: Gilmer, Texas, United States
- Genres: Country
- Occupation: Singer-songwriter
- Instruments: Vocals; Bass guitar
- Years active: 1997–present
- Label: BNA
- Spouse: Lee Ann Womack (m. 1991; div. 1996)

Jason Dale Sellers (born March 4, 1971) is an American country music artist. After several years of touring the United States in his family's band, Sellers joined the road band of Ricky Skaggs. By 1997, he was signed to a recording contract with BNA Records, for whom he recorded two studio albums: 1997's I'm Your Man and 1999's A Matter of Time. These two albums produced five singles on the Billboard Hot Country Singles & Tracks (now Hot Country Songs) charts; each album's title track reached Top 40 on that chart. Although he has not recorded any albums since A Matter of Time, Jason has had continued success as a songwriter, with acts such as Lonestar, Kenny Chesney, and Montgomery Gentry having recorded his songs. In addition, he holds several credits as a session background vocalist.

== Biography ==
Sellers was born in Gilmer, Texas. His musical beginnings were as a member of his family's gospel music group, the Singing Sellers, which toured throughout the Western United States. Between 1991 and 1996, he was married to Lee Ann Womack, with whom he had one daughter, Aubrie Lee Sellers (born 1991).

Sellers moved to Nashville, Tennessee, while still in his late teens. He then persuaded Vince Gill to allow him to play bass guitar in Gill's road band when the band's regular bassist was unavailable. Gill then recommended Sellers to Billy Joe Royal, in whose band Sellers soon became bassist. Afterward, Sellers moved to Ricky Skaggs' road band, also becoming a songwriter and road manager for Skaggs. While with Skaggs, Sellers also worked on his songwriting skills, and had songs recorded by Pam Tillis, Lonestar and Wade Hayes.

He was signed to BNA Records in 1997, releasing his debut single "I'm Your Man" this year. This song, which peaked at number 37 on the country charts, was the first of three singles from his debut album, also entitled I'm Your Man. Also released from it were "That Does It" and "This Small Divide", the latter a duet with Martina McBride.

A second album, A Matter of Time, produced his highest-charting single in its number 33-peaking title track. One day after the album's release, he exited the label's roster. The album's second single ("Can't Help Calling Your Name", previously included on I'm Your Man) peaked at number 64. He co-wrote "There's No Gift" with Australian Gina Jeffreys, which was included on her 1999 christmas album, Christmas Wish.

Although he has not released any singles since 2000, he holds several credits as a songwriter and harmony vocalist. Singles that Sellers co-wrote include "You Can't Hide Beautiful" by Aaron Lines, "I'm a Saint" by Mark Chesnutt, "Some People Change" by Montgomery Gentry, "The One in the Middle" and "He Hates Me" by Sarah Johns, "If You Didn't Love Me" by Phil Stacey, "I Still Miss You" by Keith Anderson, "Strange" by Reba McEntire, "Don't You Wanna Stay" by Jason Aldean and Kelly Clarkson, "I Won't Let Go" by Rascal Flatts, "I Got You" and "If I Didn't Have You" by Thompson Square, "Sunny and 75" by Joe Nichols, "Wherever Love Goes" by Kristy Lee Cook with Randy Houser and "Goodnight Kiss" by Randy Houser.

== Discography ==
=== Albums ===
Title	Album details
I'm Your Man	Release date: September 30, 1997; Label: BNA Records; Format: CD, cassette
A Matter of Time	Release date: September 28, 1999; Label: BNA Records; Format: CD, cassette

=== Singles ===
Year	Single	Peak chart positions		Album
Year	Single	US Country	CAN Country	Album
1997	"I'm Your Man"	37	46	I'm Your Man
1998	"That Does It"	46	84	I'm Your Man
1998	"This Small Divide" (with Martina McBride)	55	—	I'm Your Man
1999	"A Matter of Time"	33	53	A Matter of Time
2000	"Can't Help Calling Your Name"	64	—	A Matter of Time
"—" denotes releases that did not chart

=== Music videos ===
Year	Video	Director
1997	"I'm Your Man"	Jim Hershleder
1998	"This Small Divide"	chris rogers [sic]
1999	"A Matter of Time"	Thom Oliphant
