= Are You Gonna Kiss Me or Not =

Single by Thompson Square

from the album Thompson Square
- Released: July 12, 2010
- Genre: Country
- Length: 3:04
- Label: Stoney Creek
- Songwriter: Jim Collins; David Lee Murphy
- Producer: New Voice Entertainment

Thompson Square singles chronology
"Let's Fight" (2010)	"Are You Gonna Kiss Me or Not" (2010)	"I Got You" (2011)

Music video
- "Are You Gonna Kiss Me Or Not" at CMT.com

"Are You Gonna Kiss Me or Not" is a song written by Jim Collins and David Lee Murphy, and recorded by American country music duo Thompson Square. It was released in July 2010 as the second single from their self-titled debut album, which was released on February 8, 2011. The song has been certified 2× Platinum by the RIAA. On November 30, the band received two nominations in 54th Grammy Awards for the song in Best Country Duo/Group Performance and Best Country Song but lost to "Barton Hollow" by The Civil Wars and "Mean" by Taylor Swift, respectively.

== Content ==
"Are You Gonna Kiss Me or Not" is a country love song. In the first verse, the song's male narrator describes sitting with his love interest and talking, and being caught off guard when she says to him 'are you gonna kiss me or not?' In the second verse he describes the kiss favorably, and decides to take a chance and ask for her hand in marriage. The song's bridge describes the events of the couple getting married, and him lifting up her veil before asking her 'are you gonna kiss me or not?'

The song is in the key of A-flat major, with an approximate tempo of 80 beats per minute and a vocal range from A♭3 to F5.

== Music video ==
The music video was directed by Wes Edwards. It was filmed in St. Augustine, Florida in September 2010. It shows the duo singing outside a gate. It then moves to inside a lighthouse, where the performance continues. The next scene shows the duo in the water, at the beach and by the light of the moon, as well as scenes that are acted out, pertaining to the song's lyrics. The video ends with the duo kissing each other, which is actually turned out to be a reflection of them in the lighthouse's glass windows.

== Critical reception ==
Matt Bjorke of Roughstock gave the song a positive review, referring to it as "cute, playful, romantic and a prime example of the kind of song an artist needs to breakthrough with". Country Standard Time reviewer Jeff Lincoln also described the song favorably, saying that it "shows off a good bit of what makes the duo fun".

== Chart performance ==
"Are You Gonna Kiss Me or Not" became Thompson Square's first number one hit on the Country Songs chart dated for April 9, 2011. It is also the first Number One hit for the Stoney Creek label. The song has sold 2,019,000 copies in the US as of April 2013.

Chart (2010–2011)	Peak position
Canada Hot 100 (Billboard)	50
Canada Country (Billboard)	1
US Billboard Hot 100	32
US Hot Country Songs (Billboard)	1

=== Year-end charts ===
Chart (2011)	Position
US Country Songs (Billboard)	27
US Billboard Hot 100	96

== Certifications ==
Region	Certification	Certified units/sales
United States (RIAA)	2× Platinum	2,000,000^{^}
^{^} Shipments figures based on certification alone.
