= Thompson Square =

American country duo

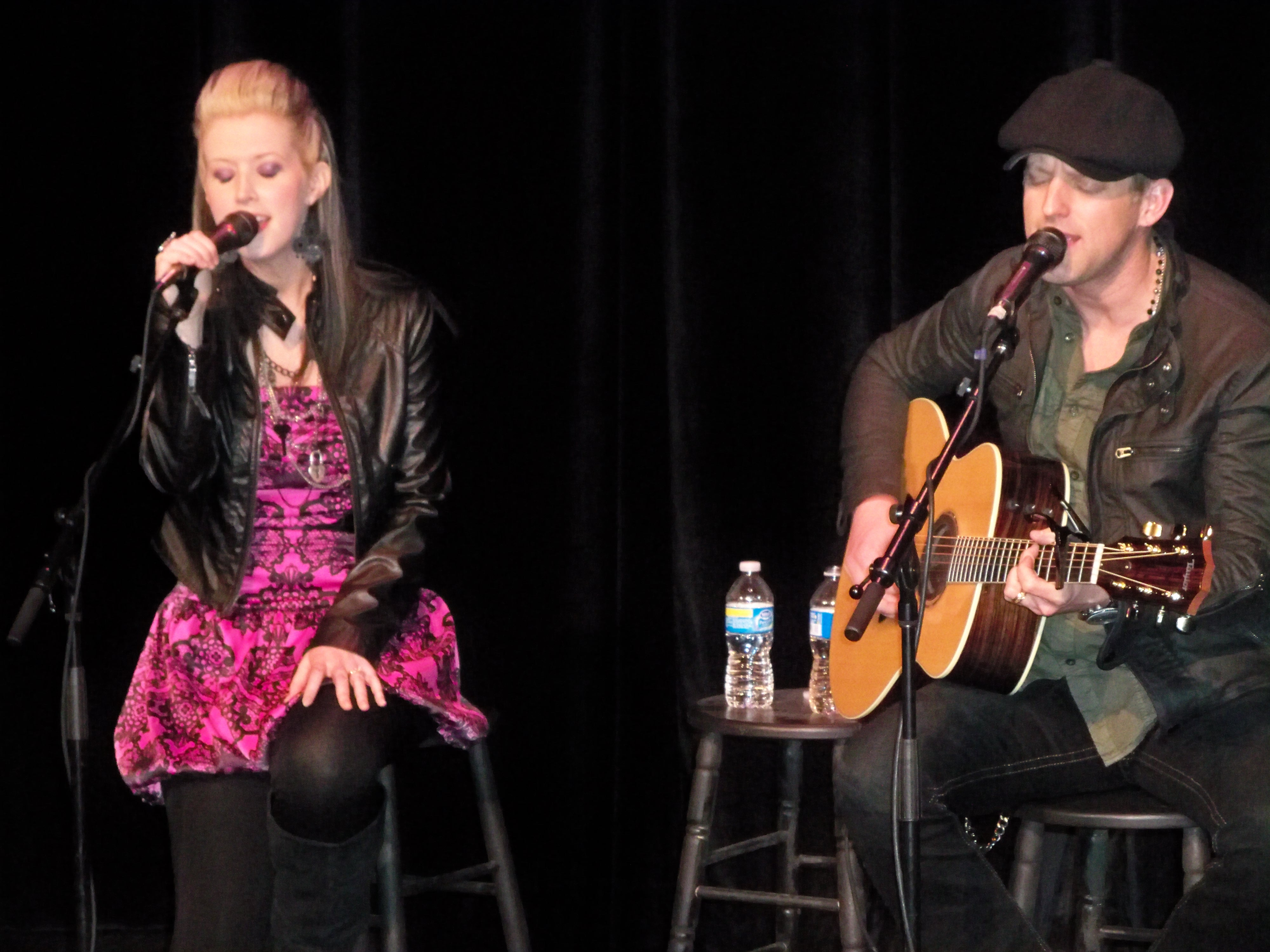
- Thompson Square in 2011

Background information
- Origin: Nashville, Tennessee, U.S.
- Genre: Country
- Years active: 2002–present
- Labels: T2, Stoney Creek, Reviver, Quartz Hill
- Members: Keifer Thompson; Shawna Thompson

Thompson Square is an American country music duo composed of husband and wife Keifer and Shawna Thompson, who alternate as vocalists. They signed to Stoney Creek Records, a sister label of Broken Bow Records, in 2010. The duo has released three albums, which have produced a combined ten chart singles on the Hot Country Songs and Country Airplay charts. Of these singles, two — "Are You Gonna Kiss Me or Not" and "If I Didn't Have You" — reached No. 1.

== History ==
Keifer Thompson was born and raised in Miami, Oklahoma. His father is Darrion Thompson. He met Shawna, a native of Chatom, Alabama, at a singing competition in Nashville, Tennessee. The two worked as solo artists before deciding to form a duo. In 2007, they sang backing vocals on Ty Herndon's Right About Now.

=== 2010–2012: Thompson Square ===
Thompson Square signed to Stoney Creek Records, a division of Broken Bow Records, in January 2010. The duo released their debut single "Let's Fight" in mid-2010. Matt Bjorke of Roughstock gave the single four-and-a-half-stars out of five, with his review calling it "one of the catchiest, best-written singles of the 2010 summer season so far." The song debuted on the Hot Country Songs chart for the week ending June 5, 2010.

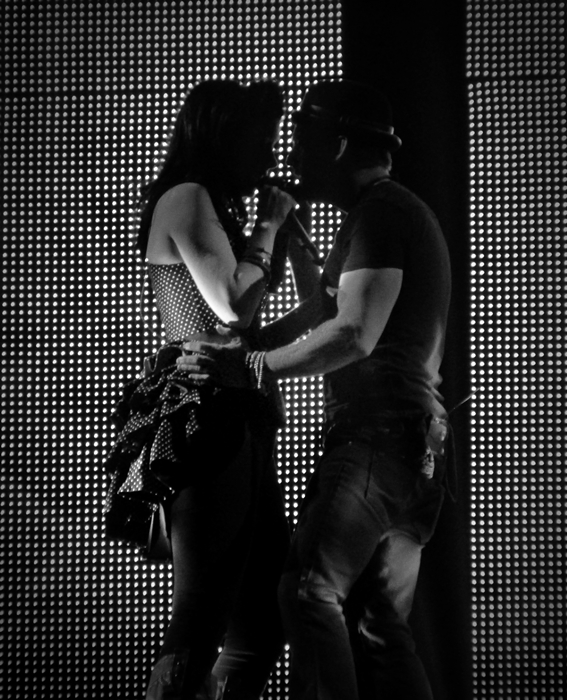
Thompson Square perform "If I Didn't Have You"

On July 12, 2010, Thompson Square released their second single, "Are You Gonna Kiss Me or Not", written by David Lee Murphy and Jim Collins. It became the duo's first number one single on the Hot Country Songs chart and has been certified double-platinum by the Recording Industry Association of America. It was the most played song of the year on Country music radio. Thompson Square received two nominations at the 54th Grammy Awards for "Are You Gonna Kiss Me or Not" in Best Country Duo/Group Performance and Best Country Song categories.

Their self-titled debut album was released on February 8, 2011. It was produced by New Voice Entertainment, a production team which includes members of labelmate Jason Aldean's road band. A third single, "I Got You," was released May 9, 2011, and reached a peak of number 8 on the country charts. Thompson Square wrote "I Got You" with Jason Sellers and Paul Jenkins. Their fourth single, "Glass", written by Ross Copperman and Jon Nite, was released on January 30, 2012. It peaked at number 15.

On April 1, 2012, Thompson Square received "Vocal Duo of the Year" award at the Academy of Country Music Awards.

=== 2012–2014: Just Feels Good ===
Thompson Square after winning 2013 CMA Vocal Duo of the Year award.

Thompson Square's fifth single, "If I Didn't Have You", made its chart debut in late 2012 and reached number one on the Country Airplay chart in May 2013. The duo wrote this song with Sellers and Jenkins. It served as the lead single to their second Stoney Creek album, Just Feels Good, which was released on March 26, 2013. The album's second single, "Everything I Shouldn't Be Thinking About", was released to country radio on June 10, 2013. Thompson Square and Murphy wrote this song with Brett James, and in early 2014, it became the duo's fourth Top 10 hit. The album's third single, "Testing the Water", was released to country radio on April 21, 2014, although after only two months, "I Can't Outrun You", was released as the fourth single on June 23, 2014, and neither made the Top 40.

The duo won the 2013 Academy of Country Music Award for Vocal Duo of the Year.

=== 2015–present: Masterpiece ===
Thompson Square's first single in nearly a year, "Trans Am," was released in March 2015. It peaked at number 44 on the Country Airplay charts. On August 4, 2015, the duo revealed they were expecting their first child, due in January. Their son, Rigney Cooper, was born in January 2016. The duo decided to leave Stoney Creek in 2016 after poor performance of singles. In November 2018, Thompson Square published a children's book titled Time To Get Dressed, which teaches children how to get ready for their day.

In 2018, they self-released their third album, Masterpiece. In March 2019, Thompson Square signed a recording deal with Reviver Entertainment, and the title track from their third album was released on July 22, 2019, as its first single. It debuted on the Billboard Country Airplay chart at number 60 in November 2019, making it their first appearance on the chart in three years.

On April 8, 2022, the duo released a new single "Country In My Soul," co-written by Lainey Wilson, Daniel Ross and James McNair. On April 28, 2022, Entertainment Focus reported that "Country In My Soul" was the second most added song of the week by radio stations nationwide.

Thompson Square embarked on "Country In My Soul Tour" from July to October 2022. On March 10, 2023, their new single, "Without You" was released.

On October 11, 2024 Thompson Square released the single "Make America Great Again" (featuring Gretchen Wilson, John Rich, and Jerrod Niemann), a song endorsing Donald Trump for president of the United States for the 2024 United States presidential election.

== Discography ==
=== Studio albums ===
| Title | Details | Peak chart positions | | | Certifications | Sales |
| Title | Details | US Country | US | US Indie | Certifications | Sales |
|---|---|---|---|---|---|---|
| Thompson Square | Release date: February 8, 2011; Label: Stoney Creek Records; Formats: CD, music download | 3 | 15 | 3 | RIAA: Gold | US: 196,000 |
| Just Feels Good | Release date: March 26, 2013; Label: Stoney Creek Records; Formats: CD, music download | 4 | 13 | 1 | | US: 36,000 |
| Masterpiece | Release date: June 1, 2018; Label: T2 Records; Formats: CD, music download | — | — | 44 | | |
"—" denotes releases that did not chart

=== Singles ===
| Year | Single | Peak chart positions | | | | | Certifications | Album |
| Year | Single | US Country Songs | US Country Airplay | US | CAN Country | CAN | Certifications | Album |
|---|---|---|---|---|---|---|---|---|
| 2008 | "Not Far Enough" | — | | — | — | — | | Non-album single |
| 2010 | "Let's Fight" | 58 | | — | — | — | | Thompson Square |
| 2010 | "Are You Gonna Kiss Me or Not" | 1 | | 32 | 1 | 50 | RIAA: 2× Platinum | Thompson Square |
| 2011 | "I Got You" | 8 | | 68 | 12 | — | | Thompson Square |
| 2012 | "Glass" | 15 | | 84 | 45 | — | | Thompson Square |
| 2012 | "If I Didn't Have You" | 7 | 1 | 49 | 14 | 70 | RIAA: Gold | Just Feels Good |
| 2013 | "Everything I Shouldn't Be Thinking About" | 15 | 4 | 69 | 11 | 72 | | Just Feels Good |
| 2014 | "Testing the Water" | — | 55 | — | — | — | | Just Feels Good |
| 2014 | "I Can't Outrun You" | — | 52 | — | — | — | | Just Feels Good |
| 2015 | "Trans Am" | — | 44 | — | — | — | | Non-album singles |
| 2016 | "You Make It Look So Good" | — | 48 | — | — | — | | Non-album singles |
| 2019 | "Masterpiece" | — | 57 | — | — | — | | Masterpiece |
| 2022 | "Country in My Soul" | — | — | — | — | — | | Non-album singles |
| 2023 | "Without You" | — | 56 | — | — | — | | Non-album singles |
| 2024 | "Make America Great Again" (featuring Gretchen Wilson, John Rich, and Jerrod Niemann) | — | — | — | — | — | | Non-album singles |
"—" denotes releases that did not chart

=== Music videos ===
| Year | Title | Director |
|---|---|---|
| 2010 | "Are You Gonna Kiss Me or Not" | Wes Edwards |
| 2011 | "I Got You" | Wes Edwards |
| 2011 | "I Got You" (live) | Eric Jensen |
| 2012 | "Glass" | Roman White |
| 2012 | "Glass" (version T2) | Wes Edwards |
| 2013 | "If I Didn't Have You" | Brian Lazzaro |
| 2013 | "Everything I Shouldn't Be Thinking About" | Chris Hicky |
| 2015 | "Trans Am" | Wes Edwards |
| 2019 | "Masterpiece" | Evan Kaufmann |
