= Knee Deep =

Single by Zac Brown Band featuring Jimmy Buffett

from the album You Get What You Give
- Released: May 9, 2011
- Genre: Country
- Length: 3:23
- Label: Atlantic; Bigger Picture; Southern Ground
- Songwriters: Zac Brown; Wyatt Durrette; Coy Bowles; Jeffrey Steele
- Producers: Zac Brown; Keith Stegall

Zac Brown Band singles chronology
"Colder Weather" (2010)	"Knee Deep" (2011)	"Keep Me in Mind" (2011)

"Knee Deep" is a song recorded by American country music group Zac Brown Band with Jimmy Buffett. It was released in May 2011 as the third single from the Zac Brown Band's second major-label album, 2010's You Get What You Give. It reached number-one on the U.S. Billboard Hot Country Songs chart for one week in August 2011. The song is about laying back and having no worries (some of the lyrics are: "Only worry in the world: 'Is the tide gonna reach my chair?'")

== Background and writing ==
Wyatt Durrette, the co-writer of "Knee Deep", told the website Taste of Country that he has been a longtime fan of Jimmy Buffett and that he wanted to write a beach-themed song. He based the first verse on a romantic breakup. Durrette brought the song to Brown, who helped him complete the second verse and melody. After neither of them could come up with a bridge, they in turn brought the song to Jeffrey Steele, who helped them complete it.

== Critical reception ==
Steve Morse of the Boston Globe called "Knee Deep" "festive" and a "highlight" of the album. Country Weekly reviewer Jessica Phillips said that the song was "happy-go-lucky" but "sounds like a derivation of the band's own hit "Toes". Eric R. Danton of the Hartford Courant called it "exactly the kind of song you'd expect to hear Jimmy Buffett sing, but with more mandolin". Kevin John Coyne, reviewing the song for Country Universe, gave it a B+ rating, saying that the song "lacks spunk but radiates the same sea-breezy blissfulness" as "Toes".

== Music video ==
The music video of "Knee Deep" was directed by Darren Doane. It was filmed in Careyes in Jalisco, Mexico, and features actress Juliette Lewis.

== Charts and certifications ==
"Knee Deep" debuted on the U.S. Billboard Hot 100 singles chart at number 73 the week ending May 28, 2011. The song kept ascending and fell twice before reaching a final peak of number 18 the week ending August 6, 2011. The song was last seen in its 20th week on the chart at number 62, before being moved to recurrent status. More than two months later, "Knee Deep" was ranked by Billboard as the 80th most popular song of 2011 in the year-end singles chart. "Colder Weather" is also on the year-end chart, giving the Zac Brown Band a total of 4 year-end singles, with "Knee Deep" narrowly the highest. The song remains the Zac Brown Band's biggest hit to date. It was also Buffett's third year-end single in 34 years.

=== Weekly charts ===
Chart (2011)	Peak position
Canada Country (Billboard)	1
Canada Hot 100 (Billboard)	42
US Hot Country Songs (Billboard)	1
US Billboard Hot 100	18

=== Year-end charts ===
Chart (2011)	Position
US Country Songs (Billboard)	12
US Billboard Hot 100	80

=== Certifications ===
Region	Certification	Certified units/sales
Canada (Music Canada)	Gold	40,000^{*}
United States (RIAA)	3× Platinum	2,181,000
^{*} Sales figures based on certification alone.

== Release history ==
Date	Region	Format
May 9, 2011	United States	Country radio
July 18, 2018	United States	Adult contemporary
