= Colder Weather =

Single by Zac Brown Band

from the album You Get What You Give
- Released: December 20, 2010
- Genre: Country
- Length: 4:35
- Label: Atlantic/Southern Ground
- Songwriters: Zac Brown; Wyatt Durrette; Levi Lowrey; Coy Bowles
- Producers: Zac Brown; Keith Stegall

Zac Brown Band singles chronology
"As She's Walking Away" (2010)	"Colder Weather" (2010)	"Knee Deep" (2011)

"Colder Weather" is a song by American country music group Zac Brown Band. Lead singer Zac Brown co-wrote the song with Coy Bowles (the band's keyboardist and guitarist), Wyatt Durrette and Levi Lowrey. It is the band's seventh single release overall, and the second single from their 2010 album You Get What You Give.

== Content ==
The lyric is about a trucker who is on the road, and separated from his lover due to the weather. Co-writer Wyatt Durrette told The Boot:

There was a girl I was seeing, who lived in Kansas City. We really liked each other, but geography and timing just wasn't working for us. She was getting pretty frustrated with the whole thing and wanted me to slow down, as far as traveling so much and all those things. I wasn't willing to do that because we were just getting started, and I'm chasing my dreams.

"Colder Weather" is in the key of E-flat major, with the guitars set to E♭ tuning. In this song, Brown's vocals range from B♭2 to A♭4.

== Critical reception ==
The song has received primarily positive reviews from critics. Jessica Phillips of Country Weekly, in her review of the album, called it "lyrically profound," and Eric R. Danton of the Hartford Courant said that it was the "sorrowful, solitary kind of song with an old-school country-ballad feel made for crisp nights in the high country." Giving it a "thumbs up," Karlie Justus of Engine 145 called it "loneliness and longing set to music", also praising the production and lyrics. She compared the song's style to Merle Haggard. Jonathan Keefe of Slant Magazine was less favorable, calling the song "somewhat strident and inorganic."

== Music video ==
The music video was directed by Darren Doane and premiered in February 2011. Australian actor Liam Hemsworth appeared in the video portraying the male character who temporarily leaves his girlfriend during the winter. Tori McPetrie portrays his girlfriend.

== Charts and certifications ==
=== Weekly charts ===
Chart (2010–2011)	Peak position
Canada Country (Billboard)	1
Canada Hot 100 (Billboard)	47
US Hot Country Songs (Billboard)	1
US Billboard Hot 100	29

=== Year-end charts ===
Chart (2011)	Position
US Country Songs (Billboard)	39
US Billboard Hot 100	99

=== Certifications ===
Region	Certification	Certified units/sales
Canada (Music Canada)	Gold	40,000^{*}
New Zealand (RMNZ)	Gold	15,000^{‡}
United States (RIAA)	2× Platinum	2,017,000
^{*} Sales figures based on certification alone.^{‡} Sales+streaming figures based on certification alone.
