= The Band Perry discography =

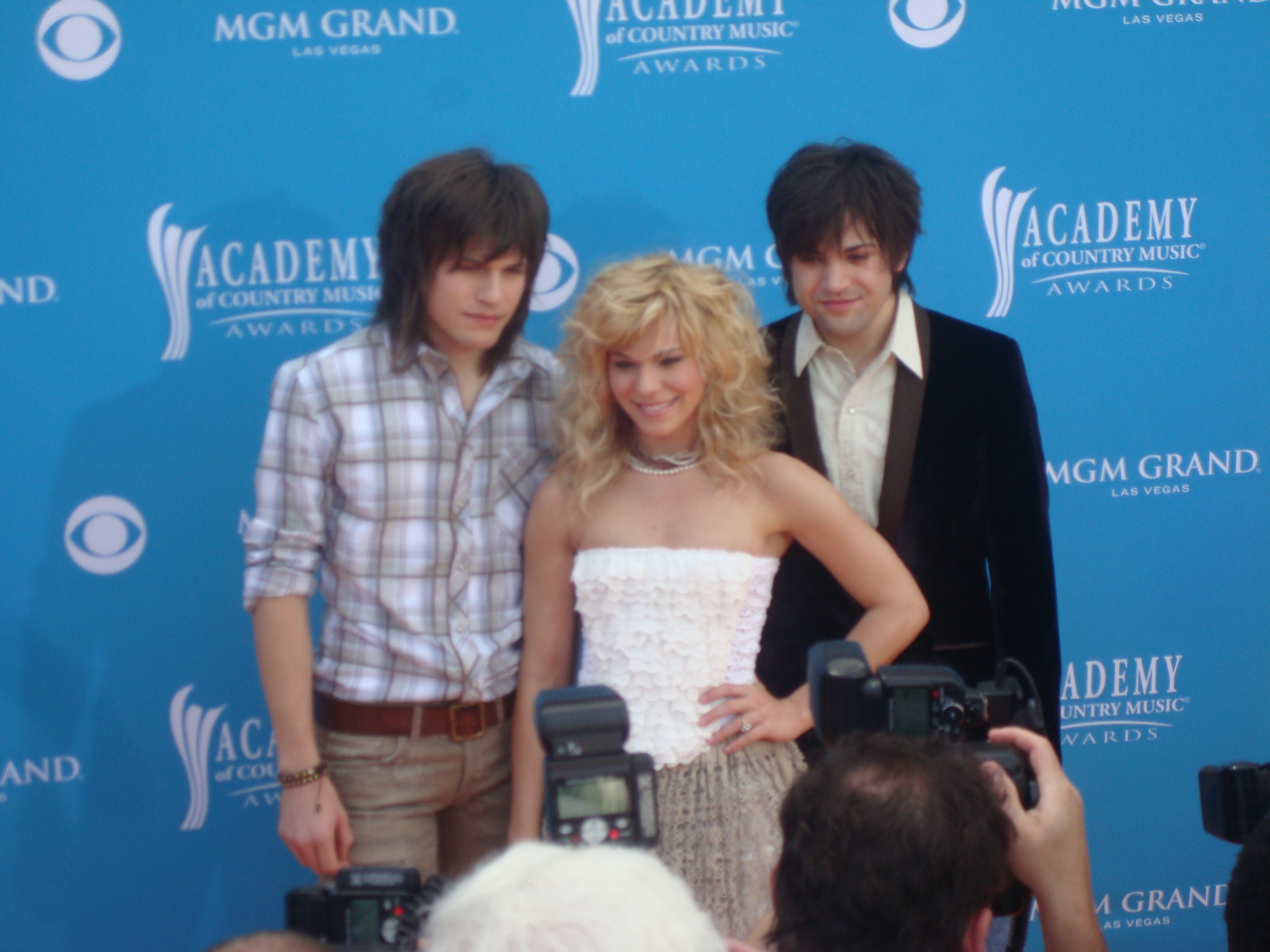
- The Band Perry (L-R: Reid, Kimberly, Neil)
- Studio albums: 2
- Extended plays: 4
- Singles: 16
- Music videos: 10

The Band Perry is an American band. Their discography comprises two studio albums, four extended plays and sixteen singles, for ten of which a music video has been filmed. The group's two albums were released on Republic Nashville before their split with the label in 2016.

== Studio albums ==
| Title | Details | Peak chart positions | | | | | | Sales | Certifications (sales threshold) |
| Title | Details | US | US Country | AUS | CAN | UK | UK Country | Sales | Certifications (sales threshold) |
|---|---|---|---|---|---|---|---|---|---|
| The Band Perry | Release date: October 12, 2010; Label: Republic Nashville; Formats: LP, CD, digital download | 4 | 2 | — | — | 46 | 1 | US: 1,600,000 | RIAA: Platinum; MC: Platinum |
| Pioneer | Release date: April 2, 2013; Label: Republic Nashville; Formats: LP, CD, digital download | 2 | 1 | 37 | 3 | 94 | 2 | | RIAA: Gold; MC: Gold |
"—" denotes releases that did not chart or were not released

== Extended plays ==
| Title | Details | Peak chart positions | | |
| Title | Details | US Country | US Heat | US Indie |
|---|---|---|---|---|
| The Band Perry EP | Release date: April 6, 2010; Label: Republic Nashville; Formats: CD, digital download | 32 | 4 | — |
| Spotify Sessions | Release date: 2013; Label: Big Machine; Formats: Streaming | — | — | — |
| From the Vault: 2010–2013 | Release date: August 3, 2018; Label: Big Machine; Formats: Digital download | — | — | — |
| Coordinates | Release date: September 21, 2018; Label: Artrat; Formats: Digital download | — | — | 42 |
| A Very Band Perry Christmas | Release date: November 6, 2026; Label: Big Machine; Formats: digital | — | — | — |
"—" denotes releases that did not chart.

== Singles ==
| Title | Year | Peak chart positions | | | | | | | | | Sales | Certifications (sales threshold) | Album |
| Title | Year | US | US Country Songs | US Country Airplay | US AC | US Adult | US Pop | CAN | CAN Country | UK | Sales | Certifications (sales threshold) | Album |
|---|---|---|---|---|---|---|---|---|---|---|---|---|---|
| "Hip to My Heart" | 2009 | — (Note: "Hip to My Heart" did not enter the Billboard Hot 100 but peaked on the Bubbling Under Hot 100 Singles chart at number one.) | 20 | | — | — | — | — | — | — | | | The Band Perry |
| "If I Die Young" | 2010 | 14 | 1 | | 1 | 4 | 12 | 48 | 8 | 82 | US: 5,000,000 | RIAA: Diamond; MC: Platinum; RMNZ: Platinum | The Band Perry |
| "You Lie" | 2011 | 42 | 2 | | — | — | — | — | 17 | — | | RIAA: Platinum | The Band Perry |
| "All Your Life" | 2011 | 37 | 1 | | — | — | — | 62 | 6 | — | | RIAA: Platinum | The Band Perry |
| "Postcard from Paris" | 2012 | 60 | 6 | | — | — | — | — | 25 | — | | RIAA: Gold | The Band Perry |
| "Better Dig Two" | 2012 | 28 | 1 | 1 | — | — | — | 42 | 1 | — | | RIAA: 2× Platinum | Pioneer |
| "Done" | 2013 | 43 | 8 | 1 | — | — | — | 48 | 1 | — | US: 782,000 | RIAA: Platinum | Pioneer |
| "Don't Let Me Be Lonely" | 2013 | 59 | 9 | 2 | — | — | — | 58 | 1 | — | US: 251,000 | RIAA: Gold | Pioneer |
| "Chainsaw" | 2014 | 86 | 20 | 10 | — | — | — | 88 | 6 | — | | | Pioneer |
| "Gentle on My Mind" | 2014 | — | 35 | 29 | — | — | — | — | — | — | | | Glen Campbell: I'll Be Me |
| "Live Forever" | 2015 | — | 29 | 27 | — | 32 | — | — | 30 | — | US: 70,000 | | Non-album singles |
| "Comeback Kid" | 2016 | — | 42 | 39 | — | — | — | — | — | — | | | Non-album singles |
| "Stay in the Dark" | 2017 | — | — | — | — | 23 | — | — | — | — | | | Non-album singles |
| "The Good Life" | 2019 | — | — | — | — | — | — | — | — | — | | | Non-album singles |
| "Nite Swim" | 2019 | — | — | — | — | — | — | — | — | — | | | Non-album singles |
| "Psychological" | 2026 | — | — | 43 | — | — | — | — | 45 | — | | | Non-album singles |
"—" denotes releases that did not chart

== Other charted songs ==
| Title | Year | Peak positions | | Album |
| Title | Year | US Country | CAN Country | Album |
|---|---|---|---|---|
| "Santa Claus Is Coming to Town" | 2011 | 29 | 45 | The Country Christmas Collection |
| "The Star-Spangled Banner" | 2012 | 59 | — | —N/a |
"—" denotes releases that did not chart

== Music videos ==
| Video | Year | Director |
|---|---|---|
| "Hip to My Heart" | 2010 | Trey Fanjoy |
| "If I Die Young" (version 1) | 2010 | David McClister |
| "You Lie" | 2011 | David McClister |
| "All Your Life" | 2011 | David McClister |
| "Better Dig Two" | 2012 | Declan Whitebloom |
| "Done" | 2013 | Declan Whitebloom |
| "Don't Let Me Be Lonely" | 2013 | Ben Krebs |
| "Chainsaw" | 2014 | David McClister |
| "Gentle on My Mind" | 2014 | Owen Thomas |
| "Live Forever" | 2015 | Colin Tilley |

== Other appearances ==
| Title | Year | Album |
|---|---|---|
| "Home This Christmas" (Justin Bieber featuring The Band Perry) | 2011 | Under the Mistletoe |
| "Grey Seal" | 2014 | Goodbye Yellow Brick Road: Revisited & Beyond |
| "Uptown Funk" (from the 2015 iHeartRadio Country Festival) | 2015 | Non-album single |
