= We Are Pioneers World Tour =

2013–14 concert tour by the Band Perry

- Tour by The Band Perry
- Associated album: Pioneer
- Start date: November 8, 2013
- End date: October 3, 2014
- Legs: 3
- No. of shows: 20 in Europe; 48 in North America; 68 in total

The Band Perry concert chronology
- We Are Pioneers World Tour (2013–14); Coordinates Tour (2018)

The We Are Pioneers World Tour was the first headlining concert tour by American country music group The Band Perry in support of their sophomore studio album, Pioneer (2013). The tour began on November 8, 2013 in Gothenburg, Sweden and ended on October 3, 2014 in Primm, Nevada. The tour was first announced in August 2013.

== Opening acts ==
- Easton Corbin
- Lindsay Ell

== Setlist ==
1. "DONE.
2. "Night Gone Wasted"
3. "You Lie"
4. "All Your Life"
5. "I'm a Keeper"
6. "Forever Mind Nevermind"
7. "Hip to My Heart"/"Postcard from Paris"
8. "The Star-Spangled Banner" (Instrumental)
9. "Pioneer"
10. "Amazing Grace (cover)
11. "Timber" (Pitbull cover)
12. "Chainsaw"
13. "Fat Bottom Girls" (Queen cover)
14. "Double Heart"
15. "Don't Let Me Be Lonely"

Encore

16. "If I Die Young"
17. "Better Dig Two"

== Tour dates ==
List of 2013 concerts
Date (2013)	City	Country	Venue
November 8	Gothenburg	Sweden	Tradgarn
November 10	Stockholm	Sweden	Cirkus
November 11	Skien	Norway	Ibsenhuset
November 12	Oslo	Norway	Folketeatret
November 13	Trondheim	Norway	Olavshallen
November 15	Helsingborg	Sweden	Tivoli
November 16	Randers	Denmark	Vaerket
November 18	Copenhagen	Denmark	Stadgarten
November 19	Hamburg	Germany	Knust
November 20	Berlin	Germany	C-Club
November 22	Munich	Germany	Storm
November 23	Zürich	Switzerland	Masscotte
November 25	Paris	France	Le Divan du Monde
November 26	Amsterdam	Netherlands	Melkweg
November 29	Birmingham	England	Birmingham HMV Institute
November 30	Glasgow	Scotland	O2 ABC Glasgow
December 1	Manchester	England	Ritz
December 2	London	England	HMV Forum
December 4	Dublin	Ireland	Vicar Street
December 5	Belfast	Northern Ireland	Mandela Hall

List of 2014 concerts
Date (2014)	City	Country	Venue
January 9	Penticton	Canada	South Okanagan Events Centre
January 10	Kamloops	Canada	Interior Savings Centre
January 11	Prince George	Canada	CN Centre
January 12	Dawson Creek	Canada	EnCana Events Centre
January 15	Red Deer	Canada	ENMAX Centrium
January 16	Lethbridge	Canada	ENMAX Centre
January 18	Regina	Canada	Brandt Centre
January 21	Sudbury	Canada	Sudbury Arena
January 22	Kitchener	Canada	Memorial Auditorium
January 24	Kingston	Canada	K-Rock Centre
January 29	Oshawa	Canada	General Motors Centre
January 31	Bangor	United States	Cross Insurance Center
February 6	Independence	United States	Independence Events Center
February 7	Brookings	United States	Swiftel Center
February 8	Bemidji	United States	Sanford Center
February 9	Grand Forks	United States	Ralph Engelstad Arena
February 13	Dubuque	United States	Five Flags Center
February 14	Kearney	United States	Viaero Event Center
February 15	Rapid City	United States	Rushmore Plaza Civic Center
February 16	Billings	United States	Rimrock Auto Arena at MetraPark
February 20	Rockford	United States	BMO Harris Bank Center
February 21	Cape Girardeau	United States	Show Me Center
February 22	Corbin	United States	Corbin Arena
February 23	Saginaw	United States	Dow Event Center
February 27	Ashwaubenon	United States	Resch Center
February 28	Mankato	United States	Verizon Wireless Center
March 1	Duluth	United States	AMSOL Arena
March 2	Cedar Rapids	United States	U.S. Cellular Center
March 7	Savannah	United States	Savannah Civic Center
March 9	Plant City	United States	Florida Strawberry Festival
March 20	Macon	United States	Macon Centreplex
March 21	Melbourne	United States	Wickham Park Amphitheater (Note: The Concert in Melbourne, FL was part of Runaway Country 2014)
March 22	Houston	United States	Reliant Stadium (Note: The concert in Houston was part of the Houston Livestock Show and Rodeo)
April 7	Las Vegas	United States	MGM Grand Garden Arena
April 11	Florence	United States	Canyon Moon Ranch (Note: The Concert in Florence, AZ was part of Country Thunder Arizona)
April 13	Florence	United States	Canyon Moon Ranch
April 18	Nashville	United States	Grand Ole Opry House
April 25	Cherokee	United States	Harrah’s Cherokee Resort Event Center
April 26	Dothan	United States	Toadlick Music Festival (Note: The Concert in Dothan, AL was part of the Toadlick Music Festival)
May 1	Wallingford	United States	Toyota Presents the Oakdale Theatre
May 2	Amherst	United States	Alumni Arena
May 3	Orillia	Canada	Casino Rama Entertainment Centre
May 15	Catoosa	United States	The Joint
May 16	Odessa	United States	Texas Thunder
May 23	Sydney	Canada	Centre 200
May 30	Virginia Beach	United States	5th Street Stage (Note: The Concert in Virginia Beach was part of the Patriotic Festival)
May 31	Atlantic City	United States	Caesars Atlantic City
June 1	Detroit	United States	Comerica Park (Note: The Concert in Detroit was part of the Downtown Hoedown)
June 6	Nashville	United States	LP Field (Note: The Concert in Nashville was part of the CMA Fest)
June 20	Austin	United States	Austin360 Amphitheater
June 21	Dallas	United States	Gexa Energy Pavilion
June 22	North Little Rock	United States	Verizon Arena
June 27	Dauphin	Canada	Dauphin's Countryfest
June 29	Greeneville	United States	Niswonger Performing Arts Center
July 3	St. Louis	United States	Fair
July 5	Battle Creek	United States	Firekeepers Casino
July 10	Ottawa	Canada	Ottawa Bluesfest
July 11	Farmingville	United States	Pennysaver Amphitheater
July 12	Richmond	United States	Classic Amphitheater
July 13	Cary	United States	Koka Booth Amphitheatre
July 17	Eau Claire	United States	Country Jam USA
July 18	Council Bluffs	United States	Stir Concert Cove
July 20	Cincinnati	United States	Buckle Up Music Festival
July 26	Indianapolis	United States	Brickyard 400 - Indianapolis Motor Speedway
July 31	Medina	United States	Medina County Fair
August 8	Detroit Lakes	United States	WE Fest
August 9	Bridgeport	United States	Country On The River
August 16	Avondale	Canada	Eastbound Park
August 28	Vienna	United States	Filene Center
August 31	Atlantis	Bahamas	Atlantis Live: Paradise Music Festival
September 7	Paso Robles	United States	Vina Robles Amphitheatre
October 2	Santa Ynez	United States	Chumash Casino
October 3	Primm	United States	Star of the Desert Arena

== Box office score data ==
Venue	City	Tickets sold / available	Gross revenue
South Okanagan Events Centre	Pentiction	3,239 / 4,084 (66%)	$162,868
Interior Savings Centre	Kamloops	3,041 / 4,112 (73%)	$155,686
CN Centre	Prince George	3,937 / 4,478 (88%)	$207,589
EnCana Events Centre	Dawson Creek	2,762 / 3,792 (73%)	$145,603
Enmax Centrium	Red Deer	4,362 / 5,000 (87%)	$226,321
Enmax Centre	Lethbridge	3,882 / 3,891 (99%)	$206,934
Brandt Centre	Regina	3,423 / 5,400 (63%)	$159,934
Sudbury Arena	Sudbury	3,000 / 3,000 (100%)	$146,150
Memorial Auditorium	Kitchener	3,628 / 5,112 (71%)	$179,114
K-Rock Centre	Kingston	4,838 / 5,000 (97%)	$234,453
General Motors Centre	Oshawa	4,552 / 4,865 (94%)	$223,252
Cross Insurance Center	Bangor	5,006 / 5,006 (100%)	$228,135
Independence Events Center	Independence	5,668 / 5,688 (100%)	$182,722
Swiftel Center	Brooking	4,167 / 4,167 (100%)	$139,697
Sanford Center	Bemidji	4,271 / 4,271 (100%)	$144,894
Ralph Engelstad Arena	Grand Forks	4,405 / 5,000 (88%)	$151,966
Five Flags Center	Dubuque	3,380 / 3,380 (100%)	$129,820
Viaero Event Center	Kearney	4,201 /4,201 (100%)	$172,033
Rushmore Plaza Civic Center	Rapid City	4,575 / 4,575 (100%)	$173,336
Rimrock Arena	Billings	5,466 / 5,466 (100%)	$193,910
BMO Harris Bank Center	Rockford	5,108 / 5,108 (100%)	$179,497
Show Me Center	Cape Girardeaue	4,191 / 4,191 (100%)	$145,277
Corbin Arena	Corbin	4,464 / 4,464 (100%)	$163,233
Dow Event Center	Saginaw	2,685 /2,698 (99%)	$141,782
Caesars Atlantic City	Atlantic City	1,432 / 1,605 (89%)	$112,913
TOTAL		99,624 / 117, 994 (84%)	4,298,169

== Critical reception ==
Kendra Meinert of the Green Bay Press Gazette says of the opening of the show, "It was a fabulous opening. A panel of three video screens led the crowd of 4,983 in a countdown, with the threesome emerging from the rolling smoke together on a platform before engaging their band members in a few choreographed dance moves, including a synchronized six-person jump line". "That exhilarating intro set the pace for an evening Kimberly promised would be part therapy and part recess, a leave-your-worries at the door celebration of "one loving country music family under this roof". And that it was — with an asterisk that this particular country family also happens to like to rock".
