= Kimberly Perry =

American musician (born 1983)

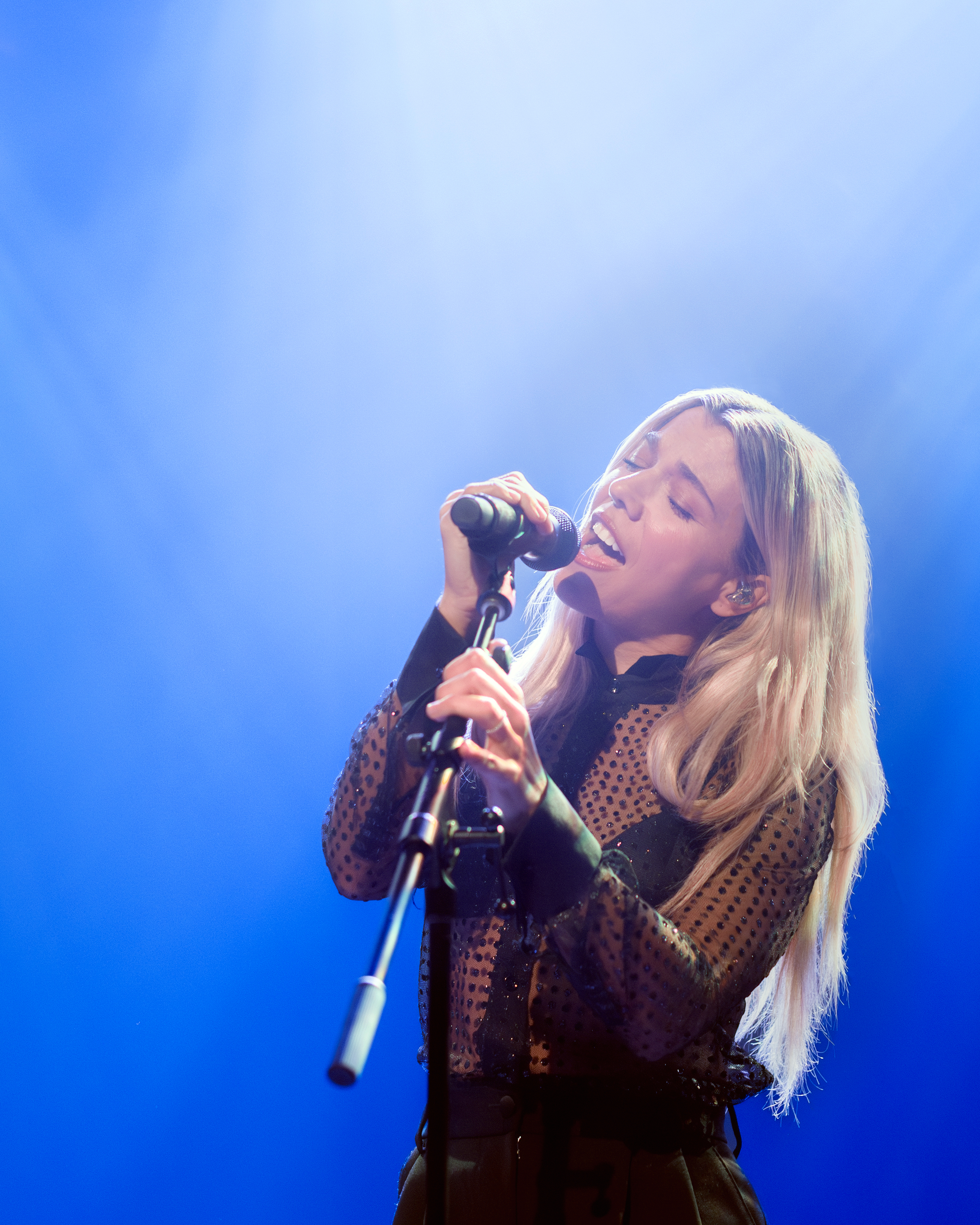
- Perry (2024)

Background information
- Born: Kimberly Marie Perry; July 12, 1983 (age 43)
- Origin: Jackson, Mississippi, United States
- Genres: Country
- Occupation: Singer-songwriter
- Instruments: Vocals, guitar
- Years active: 2005–present
- Label: Records/Columbia
- Member of: The Band Perry
- Spouse: Johnny Costello

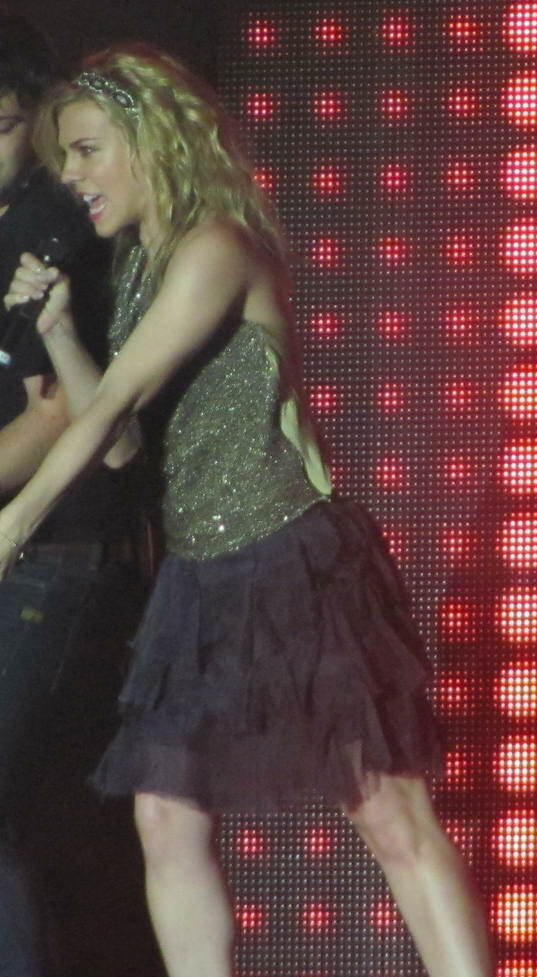
Kimberly Perry performing with The Band Perry in 2013.

Kimberly Marie Perry (born July 12, 1983) is an American singer and songwriter, best known as a member of The Band Perry.

The group signed to Republic Nashville in 2009 and released two studio albums with the label, achieving three number one singles on the Billboard Hot Country Songs chart, as well as three additional top ten singles. As a member of the band, Perry received a Grammy Award, three Country Music Association Awards and four Academy of Country Music Awards.

The band transitioned to pop in 2017 and attained limited success before officially announcing a hiatus in 2023. Following this, Kimberly recorded as a solo artist.

== Career ==
=== Beginnings ===
Perry sang in her own band as a teenager with her brothers Neil and Reid working as roadies and eventually as her opening act. Kimberly released an EP entitled "Carry On" with a song of the same name inspiring two songs on "Pioneer". Once they had united to form as "the Band Perry", they joined a New Faces of Country tour in 2005.During her early years of performing, Perry also worked with renowned vocal coach Jan Smith Studios in Atlanta, which helped her refine her vocal technique and stage presence before launching The Band Perry’s career.

=== The Band Perry ===
In 2008, they were discovered by Garth Brooks' manager Bob Doyle, who helped them make recordings that were sent to Scott Borchetta, head of the newly established Republic Nashville label and were subsequently signed the following year, releasing their debut single "Hip to My Heart" in November 2009. Their five track self-tiled extended play was released on April 6, 2010, and was later expanded into their debut album, which was released on October 12 that same year. The album included "Hip to My Heart", which reached number 20 on the Billboard Hot Country Songs chart, and four additional singles which all reached the top 10. The album's second single "If I Die Young", was a breakthrough for the band, becoming their first number one and being certified 6× platinum and sold 1.6 million copies. The band subsequently won the Country Music Association Award for New Artist of the Year and Single of the Year, with Kimberly, the sole writer of "If I Die Young", also winning Song of the Year and becoming just the fourth woman to win the award with a solo composition. Perry was also nominated for the Grammy Award for Best Country Song at the 53rd Grammy Awards, while The Band Perry won New Vocal Duo/Group and Top New Artist at the 2011 Academy of Country Music Awards. Additional singles from their self-titled debut included "You Lie", which reached number two, "All Your Life", which became the group's second number one, and "Postcard from Paris", which reached number six.

Beginning in 2012, The Band Perry started working on their follow-up album, releasing the lead single "Better Dig Two" on October 29 of that year. The song became their third number one and was certified 2× platinum. The second single, "Done", was released in March 2013, with the album, Pioneer being released on April 2, 2013, and becoming their first number one album on the Top Country Albums chart. The album also featured the top ten singles "Don't Let Me Be Lonely" and "Chainsaw". The Band Perry won Top Vocal Group at the 2013 Academy of Country Music Awards based on the strength of the album. In 2014, they recorded a cover of "Gentle on My Mind" for the documentary Glen Campbell: I'll Be Me, which won them the Grammy Award for Best Country Duo/Group Performance in 2015.

On August 14, 2015, the band released "Live Forever" off their planned third studio album and subsequently signed with Interscope Records with the plan to release more pop-oriented material. They released several singles, including "Comeback Kid" and "Stay in the Dark" on Interscope to limited success and a third album, tentatively titled Heart + Beat and later My Bad Imagination, never materialized and they left the label in mid-2018. The group self-released a five track extended play in September 2018 titled Coordinates.

=== Solo career ===
The Band Perry announced that they were officially going on hiatus on March 27, 2023, to focus on solo projects. Kimberly was the first to reveal plans and signed with RECORDS, a subsidiary of Columbia to release her debut solo single "If I Die Young Pt. 2" on May 5, 2023, the first track from Bloom, an extended play which was released on June 9. In an interview with Rolling Stone, Perry stated that she was hoping to have her debut solo album completed by the fall of 2023.

A longer version of the Bloom EP, titled Superbloom, was released on October 27, including several new songs, such as "Fool's Gold", "Black Corvette", and "Monsters".

== Personal life ==
Perry announced her engagement to Toronto Blue Jays catcher J. P. Arencibia on September 30, 2013, and married him in Greeneville, Tennessee, on June 12, 2014. The pair divorced in March 2018. Perry married Johnny Costello in June 2021 and announced that the couple were expecting their first child in April 2023. On June 1, Perry revealed that she had previously suffered a miscarriage prior to recording "If I Die Young Pt. 2". The couple's child was born August 26, 2023.

== Discography ==
=== Studio albums ===
Extended play, with selected details
Title	EP details
Superbloom	Release date: October 27, 2023; Label: Records/Columbia; Format: CD, digital download, LP

=== Extended plays ===
Extended play, with selected details
Title	EP details
Bloom	Release date: June 9, 2023; Label: Records/Columbia; Format: CD, digital download, LP

=== Singles ===
Single, with selected chart position
Single	Year	Peak chart positions	Album
Single	Year	US Country Airplay	Album
"If I Die Young Pt. 2"	2023	31	Superbloom

with The Band Perry

- The Band Perry (2010)
- Pioneer (2013)

== Awards and nominations ==
Year	Association	Category	Result
2010	Country Music Association Awards	Vocal Group of the Year	Nominated
2010	American Country Awards	New/Breakthrough Artist of the Year	Nominated
2010	American Country Awards	Duo/Group of the Year	Nominated
2011	53rd Grammy Awards	Best Country Song — "If I Die Young"	Nominated
2011	Academy of Country Music Awards	Top New Vocal Duo or Group	Won
2011	Academy of Country Music Awards	Top New Artist	Won
2011	Academy of Country Music Awards	Top Vocal Group	Nominated
2011	Academy of Country Music Awards	Single Record of the Year — "If I Die Young"	Nominated
2011	Academy of Country Music Awards	Song of the Year — "If I Die Young"	Nominated
2011	2011 Billboard Music Awards	Top Country Song — "If I Die Young"	Nominated
2011	CMT Music Awards	Video of the Year — "If I Die Young"	Nominated
2011	CMT Music Awards	Group Video of the Year — "If I Die Young"	Nominated
2011	CMT Music Awards	USA Weekend Breakthrough Video of the Year — "If I Die Young"	Won
2011	CMT Music Awards	Nationwide Insurance On Your Side Award	Won
2011	2011 Teen Choice Awards	Choice Music: Country Single — "If I Die Young"	Nominated
2011	2011 Teen Choice Awards	Choice Music: Country Group	Nominated
2011	Inspirational Country Music Awards	Inspirational Video — "If I Die Young"	Nominated
2011	Country Music Association Awards	New Artist of the Year	Won
2011	Country Music Association Awards	Vocal Group of the Year	Nominated
2011	Country Music Association Awards	Single of the Year — "If I Die Young"	Won
2011	Country Music Association Awards	Song of the Year — "If I Die Young"	Won
2011	Country Music Association Awards	Music Video of the Year — "If I Die Young"	Nominated
2011	American Music Awards	Sprint New Artist of the Year	Nominated
2011	American Music Awards	Country Music: Favorite Band, Duo or Group	Nominated
2011	American Music Awards	Country Music: Favorite Album — The Band Perry	Nominated
2011	American Country Awards	Artist of the Year: Duo or Group	Nominated
2011	American Country Awards	Artist of the Year: New Artist	Nominated
2011	American Country Awards	Single of the Year: Duo or Group — "You Lie"	Nominated
2011	American Country Awards	Single of the Year: New Artist — "You Lie"	Nominated
2011	American Country Awards	Music Video: Duo, Group or Collaboration — "You Lie"	Nominated
2011	American Country Awards	Music Video: New Artist — "You Lie"	Nominated
2012	54th Grammy Awards	Best New Artist	Nominated
2012	Academy of Country Music Awards	Vocal Group of the Year	Nominated
2012	2012 Billboard Music Awards	Top Country Album: The Band Perry	Nominated
2012	CMT Music Awards	Group Video of The Year – "All Your Life"	Nominated
2012	2012 Teen Choice Awards	Country Group	Nominated
2012	Country Music Association Awards	Vocal Group of the Year	Nominated
2012	American Country Awards	Artist of the Year: Group	Nominated
2012	American Country Awards	Single of the Year: Group- "All Your Life"	Nominated
2012	American Country Awards	Music Video of the Year: Group- "All Your Life"	Nominated
2013	British Country Music Association Awards	International Act of the Year	Nominated
2013	Academy of Country Music Awards	Top Vocal Group	Won
2013	CMT Music Awards	Group Video of the Year - "Better Dig Two"	Nominated
2013	Teen Choice Awards	Choice Music: Break-Up Song- "DONE."	Nominated
2013	Teen Choice Awards	Choice Music: Country Group	Nominated
2014	ACM Awards	Vocal Group of the Year	Won
2014	CMT Awards	Group Video of the Year - "DONE."	Won
2014	CMT Awards	CMT Performance Video of the Year - "My Songs Know What You Did in the Dark (Light 'Em Up)" w/(Fall Out Boy)	Nominated
2014	Teen Choice Awards	Choice Music: Country Group	Nominated
2014	CMA Awards	Vocal Group of the Year	Nominated
2015	People's Choice Awards	Favorite Country Group	Nominated
2015	57th Grammy Awards	Best Country Duo/Group Performance – "Gentle on My Mind"	Won
2015	ACM Awards	Vocal Group of the Year	Nominated
2015	CMA Awards	Vocal Group of the Year	Nominated
2016	People's Choice Awards	Favorite Country Group	Nominated
2017	People's Choice Awards	Favorite Country Group	Nominated
