= 2011 Country Music Association Awards =

Annual US music awards ceremony

- Date: November 9, 2011
- Location: Bridgestone Arena, Nashville, Tennessee, U.S.
- Hosted by: Brad Paisley; Carrie Underwood

Highlights
- Most wins: The Band Perry (3)
- Most nominations: Taylor Swift; Jason Aldean; Brad Paisley (5 each)

Television/radio coverage
- Network: ABC

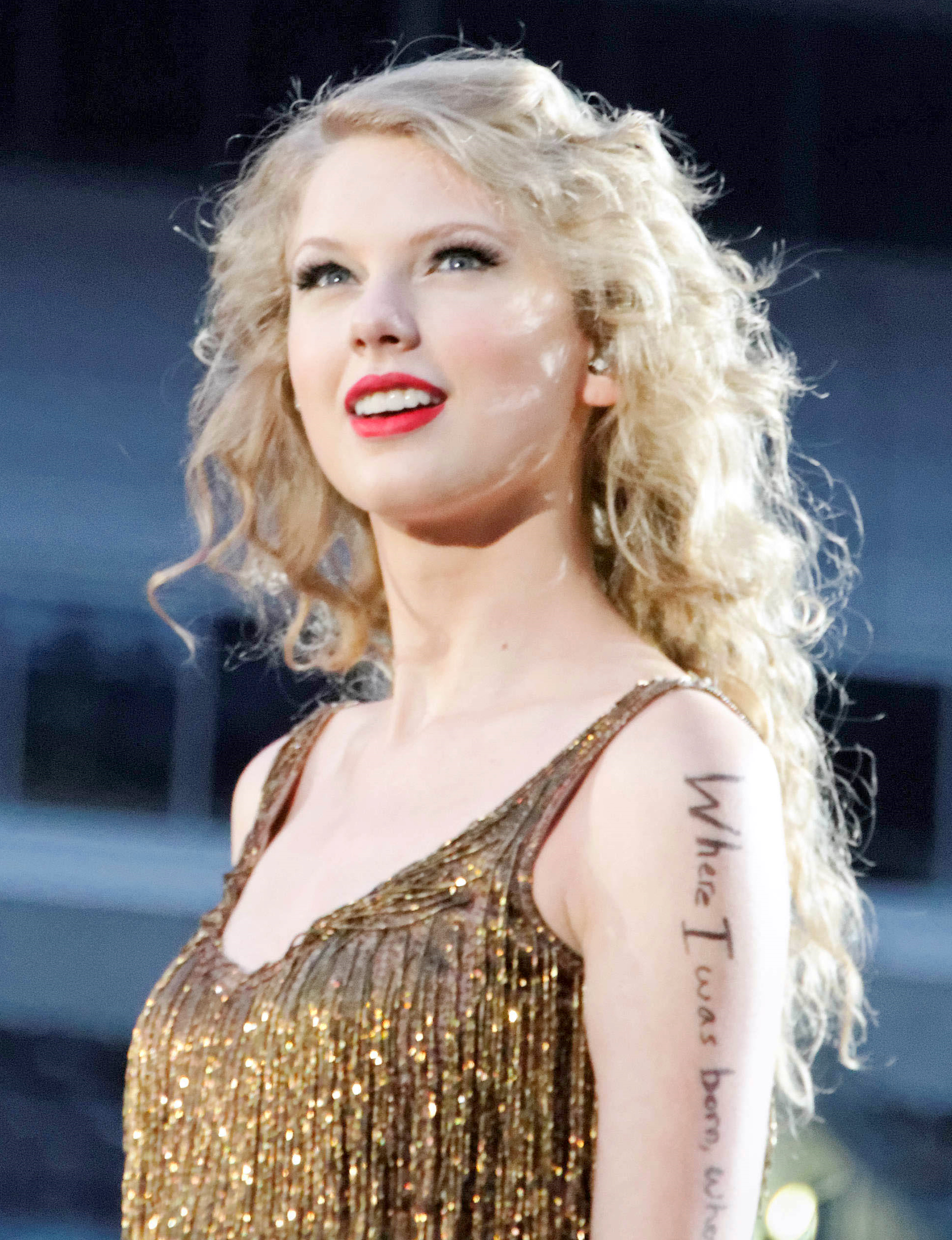
Taylor Swift, Entertainer of the Year recipient.

The 2011 Country Music Association Awards, 45th Annual Ceremony, is a music award ceremony that was held on November 9, 2011, at the Bridgestone Arena in Nashville, Tennessee. The ceremony was co-hosted for the fourth consecutive year by Brad Paisley and Carrie Underwood.

The night's top prize, entertainer of the year, went to Taylor Swift, which was her only victory of the evening. She became only the second female artist to ever win the honor twice, after Barbara Mandrell won it in 1980 and 1981.

== Winners and nominees ==
Winners are shown in bold.

Entertainer of the Year	Album of the Year
**Taylor Swift**; Jason Aldean; Brad Paisley; Blake Shelton; Keith Urban	**My Kinda Party** — **Jason Aldean**; All About Tonight — Blake Shelton; Speak Now — Taylor Swift; This Is Country Music — Brad Paisley; You Get What You Give — Zac Brown Band
Male Vocalist of the Year	Female Vocalist of the Year
**Blake Shelton**; Jason Aldean; Kenny Chesney; Brad Paisley; Keith Urban	**Miranda Lambert**; Sara Evans; Martina McBride; Taylor Swift; Carrie Underwood
Vocal Group of the Year	Vocal Duo of the Year
**Lady Antebellum**; Little Big Town; Rascal Flatts; The Band Perry; Zac Brown Band	**Sugarland**; The Civil Wars; Montgomery Gentry; Steel Magnolia; Thompson Square
Single of the Year	Song of the Year
**"If I Die Young"** — **The Band Perry**; "A Little Bit Stronger" — Sara Evans; "Colder Weather" — Zac Brown Band; "Don't You Wanna Stay" — Jason Aldean and Kelly Clarkson; "Honey Bee" — Blake Shelton	**"If I Die Young"** — **Kimberly Perry**; "Colder Weather" — Zac Brown, Wyatt Durrette, Levi Lowrey and Coy Boyels; "Dirt Road Anthem" — Brantley Gilbert and Colt Ford; "Mean" — Taylor Swift; "You and Tequila" — Matraca Berg and Deana Carter
New Artist of the Year	Musician of the Year
**The Band Perry**; Luke Bryan; Eric Church; Thompson Square; Chris Young	**Mac McAnally**; Sam Bush; Jerry Douglas; Paul Franklin; Dann Huff
Music Video of the Year	Musical Event of the Year
**"You and Tequila"** — **Kenny Chesney; (Dir. Shaun Silva)**; "Old Alabama" — Brad Paisley and Alabama; (Dir. Jim Shea); "If I Die Young" — The Band Perry; (Dir. David McClister); "Mean" — Taylor Swift; (Dir. Declan Whitebloom); "Honey Bee" — Blake Shelton; (Dir. Trey Fanjoy)	**"Don't You Wanna Stay"** — **Jason Aldean and Kelly Clarkson**; "As She's Walking Away" — Zac Brown Band and Alan Jackson; "Coal Miner's Daughter" — Loretta Lynn, Sheryl Crow and Miranda Lambert; "Old Alabama" — Brad Paisley and Alabama; "You and Tequila" — Kenny Chesney and Grace Potter
International Artist Achievement Award
**Brad Paisley**

== Hall of Fame ==
Country Music Hall of Fame
- Bobby Braddock
- Reba McEntire
- Jean Shepard

== Performers ==
Artist(s)	Song(s)
Blake Shelton; Kenny Loggins	"Footloose"
Keith Urban	"You Gonna Fly"
Sara Evans	"A Little Bit Stronger"
Miranda Lambert	"Baggage Claim"
Zac Brown Band; Gregg Allman	"Georgia On My Mind"
Rascal Flatts; Natasha Bedingfield	"Easy"
Eric Church	"Drink in My Hand"
Thompson Square	"Are You Gonna Kiss Me or Not"
Chris Young	"Voices"
Taylor Swift	"Ours"
Luke Bryan	"Country Girl (Shake It for Me)"
Lady Antebellum	"We Owned the Night"
Kenny Chesney; Grace Potter	"You and Tequila"
Little Big Town; Darius Rucker; Rascal Flatts; Lionel Richie	"Deep River Woman" "Stuck On You" "Dancing On The Ceiling"
Martina McBride	"I'm Gonna Love You Through It"
The Band Perry	"All Your Life"
Matt Nathanson; Sugarland	"Run"
Brad Paisley; Carrie Underwood	"Remind Me"
Jason Aldean	"Tattoos on This Town"
Vince Gill; Keith Urban; Brad Paisley	Glen Campbell Tribute "By the Time I Get to Phoenix" "Wichita Lineman" "Galveston"
Faith Hill	"Come Home"

== Presenters ==
Presenter(s)	Award
Eric Stonestreet	Single of the Year
Kellie Pickler and Kellan Lutz	Song of the Year
Jake Owen and Lauren Alaina	New Artist of the Year
David Freese and Erin Andrews	Album of the Year
Ginnifer Goodwin and Josh Dallas	Vocal Duo of the Year
LeAnn Rimes and Billy Currington	Vocal Group of the Year
Reese Witherspoon	Male Vocalist of the Year
Dierks Bentley and Emily VanCamp	Female Vocalist of the Year
Reba McEntire	Entertainer of the Year
