= The Band Perry (EP) =

The Band Perry — EP

EP by The Band Perry
- Released: April 6, 2010
- Genre: Country
- Length: 16:52
- Label: Republic Nashville
- Producer: Nathan Chapman; Paul Worley

The Band Perry chronology
The Band Perry — EP (2010)	The Band Perry (2010)

Professional ratings
Review scores
Source	Rating
Roughstock	4/5 stars

The Band Perry is an extended play released from country music group The Band Perry. The extended play is the group's first release on Republic Nashville. It was released on April 6, 2010, and debuted at No. 46 on the U.S. Billboard Top Country Albums chart the following week as well as No. 37 on the Top Heatseekers chart. It features their debut single, "Hip to My Heart", which was a Top 20 hit on the Hot Country Songs charts. Also included is "If I Die Young", which was released as their second single. It has also become their first entry on the Billboard Hot 100.

All songs from the EP later appeared on the band's self-titled debut album.

== Critical reception ==
Matt Bjorke of Roughstock gave the extended play a rating of 4 out of 5, stating that "Hip to My Heart" was infectious, however the rest of the album doesn't feel like anything "hip". He also said while not every song is going to hit, their talent is there to raise even the ‘lowest’ song up to something interesting and worthy of listening to.

== Track listing ==
No.	Title	Writer(s)	Length
1.	"Hip to My Heart"	Brett Beavers, Kimberly Perry, Neil Perry, Reid Perry	3:00
2.	"If I Die Young"	K. Perry	3:43
3.	"Postcard from Paris"	K. Perry, N. Perry, R. Perry, Kara DioGuardi, Jeff Cohen	3:36
4.	"All Your Life"	Brian Henningsen, Clara Henningsen	3:52
5.	"Quittin' You"	K. Perry, N. Perry, R. Perry	3:21
Total length:			16:52

== Chart performance ==
The Band Perry — EP debuted at No. 46 on the U.S. Billboard Top Country Albums chart and No. 37 on the Top Heatseekers chart following its release in April 2010. As of September 2010, it has peaked at No. 32 on the U.S. Billboard Top Country Albums chart and #4 on the U.S. Billboard Top Heatseekers chart.

Chart (2010)	Peak position
U.S. Billboard Top Country Albums	32
U.S. Billboard Top Heatseekers	4
