= MAKUTA =

MAKUTA (Doug, Jane, Aleata, and Rose) is a 4-member pop-rock group, from Brooklyn, New York, signed with Timbaland's Anthem-Bluestone venture. They released their new album "Phosphenes" on November 15, 2019, one EP "The Kingbird Sessions" (in 2014), and several singles.

MAKUTA has toured with The Band Perry, Keaton Simons, and others, and have collaborated with many artists of note, including Timbaland, Hunter Hayes, John Oates (of Hall & Oates), Scott Storch, Mike Viola, Ron Carter, Aaron Henningsen, Bleu (musician), Peedi Peedi, Zumba, and James Maslow. Their music has been featured on CBS (the television show Pure Genius), Wells Fargo, Yahoo!, and Billboard, and received critical praise from the likes of Perez Hilton. They were also featured headline performers at the inaugural GRAMMY Block Party.
