= Virginia Credit Union Live! =

Virginia Credit Union LIVE!
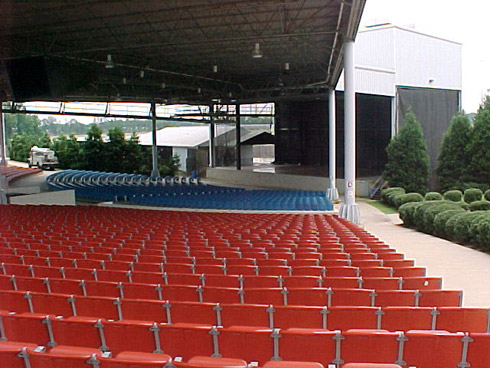
- Interactive map of Virginia Credit Union LIVE!
- Former names: Classic Amphitheater (1991—2018)
- Location: Richmond, Virginia, United States
- Coordinates: 37°35′24″N 77°25′03″W
- Owner: International Speedway Corporation
- Operator: International Speedway Corporation; AEG Live (concert booking)
- Seating type: reserved
- Capacity: 6,000
- Type: Outdoor amphitheatre

Construction
- Opened: 1991

Virginia Credit Union LIVE! at Richmond Raceway, formerly the Classic Amphitheater, is a 6,000-seat outdoor concert venue located in Richmond, Virginia, United States. It is adjacent to the Richmond Raceway.

== History ==
Prior to the opening of the amphitheater in 1991, the Richmond area had seen a major decline in major music acts at its indoor arena, Richmond Coliseum. When the amphitheater opened, seasons were packed with A-list music acts that Richmond had not seen in several years. For the first few years of its operation, the summer concert series was titled the "Budweiser Concert Series," sponsored by Budweiser. Since many summer concert tours were mounted solely for outdoor venues, Richmond was the only Virginia stop on the tour of many artists on their summer itineraries, making it a destination venue for people from all over the state. When the larger outdoor venues in Manassas and Virginia Beach were built, starting in 1995, with substantially larger capacities, the Classic Amphitheater noticed a steady decline in the quality of shows promoters were able to book there. Although it was still able to secure several A-list acts each season, more and more acts were again skipping Richmond for the larger venues. In its last official season, in 1999, only one act was booked that summer -- Hootie & the Blowfish. After that season, the promoter pulled out of the venue and the owners were not able to attract the interest of any other promoters. During the summer of 2013, the venue resumed presenting summer concerts.

Though seen as state-of-the-art at the time of its opening, in comparison to similar contemporary amphitheaters, the Classic Amphitheater had several downfalls. Sales and consumption of alcohol was restricted to a gated-off area, away from the seating; no alcohol could be taken into the seating areas. Though it had several corporate sponsorships, the venue did not have formal box-seating or suites for its sponsors—a major component of contemporary amphitheaters. The lawn seating area was smaller than the fixed seating area—at most contemporary amphitheaters, the festival lawn seating is often twice the size (or larger) of the fixed seating.

On November 28, 2016, Richmond Raceway and AEG Live announced an exclusive booking agreement for The Classic Amphitheater for the 2017 season.

On June 27, 2017, Richmond Raceway and AEG Live announced a 10-year booking agreement for the amphitheater.

On February 7, 2018, Richmond Raceway and Virginia Credit Union announced a multi-year naming rights agreement for the outdoor venue.

== Events ==
List of events held at the Amphitheater
Artist	Event	Date	Opening Act(s)
10,000 Maniacs	Our Time in Eden Tour	June 22, 1993	World Party
311	311 Tour	September 14, 1996	Deftones & The Urge
The 1975	A Brief Inquiry into Online Relationships Tour	May 22, 2019	Pale Waves & No Rome
Aerosmith	Get a Grip Tour	September 19, 1994	Collective Soul
Aerosmith	Nine Lives Tour	July 14, 1997	Jonny Lang
"Weird Al" Yankovic with the Richmond Symphony	Strings Attached Tour	June 27, 2019	
Alan Jackson & The Strayhorns	A Lot About Livin' (And a Little 'bout Love) Tour	September 17, 1993	John Anderson
Alan Jackson & The Strayhorns	Who I Am Tour	September 18, 1994	Faith Hill
Alan Jackson & The Strayhorns	1995 Tour	October 8, 1995	David Ball
Alan Jackson & The Strayhorns	Everything I Love Tour	May 16, 1997	LeAnn Rimes
Alan Jackson & The Strayhorns	1998 Tour	May 16, 1998	Deana Carter
All-4-One	All-4-One Tour	October 1, 1994	
The Allman Brothers Band	1992 Tour	September 1, 1992	
The Allman Brothers Band	1995 Tour	August 1, 1995	Chris Anderson Band & DAG
The Allman Brothers Band	1996 Tour	July 3, 1996	Edwin McCain Band & Jupiter Coyote
The Allman Brothers Band	1998 Tour	September 15, 1998	Sister Hazel
Amy Grant	House of Love Tour	August 20, 1995	NewSong
The Avett Brothers	The Carpenter Tour	July 25, 2013	
The Avett Brothers	2019 Tour	June 9, 2019	
The B-52's	1994 Tour	July 17, 1994	Booker T. & the M.G.'s
The B-52's	1998 Tour	July 30, 1998	The Pretenders
The Band Perry	We Are Pioneers World Tour	July 12, 2014	Easton Corbin & Lindsay Ell
Barry Manilow	Summer of '78 Tour	July 19, 1997	
Barry White	The Icon Is Love Tour	July 30, 1995	Chanté Moore
Bastille	Doom Days Tour	September 28, 2019	
Big & Rich	All Star Country Music Jam	July 8, 2019	Cowboy Troy & DJ Sinister
The Beach Boys	Stars and Stripes Vol. 1 Tour	July 3, 1997	
Big Rockstock		May 30, 1998	
Big Rockstock		May 31, 1998	
Billy Ray Cyrus	1994 Tour	July 8, 1994	Ken Mellons
Billy Strings	Fall 2021 Tour	November 12, 2021	
Billy Strings	Fall 2022 Tour	November 16, 2022	
Bob Dylan	Never Ending Tour 1996	May 4, 1996	Aimee Mann
Bon Iver	USS-S Tour 2022	June 12, 2022	Bonny Light Horseman
Bonnie Raitt	Longing in Their Hearts Tour	October 19, 1994	The Band
Boston	Walk On Tour	June 20, 1995	
Brantley Gilbert	Let It Ride Tour	June 12, 2014	Jon Pardi
Brooks & Dunn	1994 Tour	May 19, 1994	Aaron Tippin & Faith Hill
Brooks & Dunn	Waitin' on Sundown Tour	July 6, 1995	Joe Diffie & Wade Hayes
Bruce Hornsby	Harbor Lights Tour	September 4, 1993	
Bruce Hornsby	1996 Tour	May 18, 1996	The Aquarium Rescue Unit
Bryson Tiller	2017 Tour	September 1, 2017	Metro Boomin & H.E.R.
BuzzFest: Party for the Planet		April 21, 1996	
BuzzFest: Party for the Planet		April 11, 1997	
BuzzFest: Party for the Planet		May 17, 1998	
Cake & Ben Folds	2018 Tour	August 19, 2018	Tall Heights
Carman	1994 Tour	September 23, 1994	
Carole King	Colour of Your Dreams Tour	June 13, 1993	
Chicago	30th Anniversary Tour	August 10, 1997	
Clay Walker	Hypnotize the Moon Tour	September 29, 1995	Martina McBride
Clint Black	One Emotion Tour	September 30, 1994	Gibson/Miller Band
Clint Black	1998 Tour	August 29, 1998	Steve Wariner
Cody Jinks	2019 Tour	August 10, 2019	Ward Davis
Collin Raye	1997 Tour	September 26, 1997	
The Connells	Ring Tour	October 9, 1993	
Darius Rucker	True Believers Tour	July 18, 2014	Joel Crouse
Dark Star Orchestra	2019 Tour	August 15, 2019	
Daron Norwood	Ready, Willing & Able Tour	September 26, 1995	
Dave Matthews Band	Under the Table and Dreaming Tour	July 25, 1995	The Samples & Dionne Farris
Dave Matthews Band	Crash Tour	April 30, 1996	
Dave Matthews Band	1997 Tour	June 3, 1997	Béla Fleck and the Flecktones
Death Cab for Cutie	Asphalt Meadows Tour	October 6, 2022	
Delbert McClinton	Never Been Rocked Enough Tour	October 11, 1992	
Delbert McClinton	One of the Fortunate Few Tour	September 25, 1997	
Dirty Heads & SOJA	2017 Tour	June 16, 2017	The Green & RDGLDGRN
The Doobie Brothers	1993 Tour	August 20, 1993	4 Wheel Drive
Earth, Wind & Fire	1995 Tour	June 6, 1995	
Elvis Costello	2017 Tour	June 20, 2017	Imelda May
The Everly Brothers	1993 Tour	July 17, 1993	Dion DiMucci
Fleetwood Mac	Another Link in the Chain Tour	August 23, 1994	Bad Company
Florida Georgia Line	Here's to the Good Times Tour	August 29, 2013	Colt Ford
Glass Animals	Dreamland Tour	September 27, 2021	
Goo Goo Dolls	A Boy Named Goo Tour	September 26, 1996	10,000 Maniacs & Barenaked Ladies
Gordon Lightfoot	1992 Tour	September 27, 1992	
Gucci Mane		October 7, 2016	Lil Uzi Vert, 21 Savage & DRAM
Gucci Mane	Stone Soul Music and Food Festival	June 8, 2019	Robin Thicke, Lloyd, Mario, & Nicole Bus
H.O.R.D.E. Festival		July 27, 1993	
H.O.R.D.E. Festival		August 24, 1994	
Hank Williams Jr.	Out of Left Field Tour	May 25, 1993	
Hank Williams Jr.	Hog Wild Tour	June 11, 1995	Rick Trevino
Hank Williams Jr.	Three Hanks: Men with Broken Hearts Tour	July 20, 1997	Charlie Daniels Band, Travis Tritt & Jo Dee Messina
The Hooters	Out of Body Tour	July 24, 1993	The Smithereens
Hootie & the Blowfish	Cracked Rear View Tour	June 25, 1995	Dillon Fence
Hootie & the Blowfish	Musical Chairs Tour	July 21, 1999	Shawn Mullins
Indigo Girls	Swamp Ophelia Tour	June 21, 1994	Kristen Hall
Indigo Girls	Shaming of the Sun Tour	May 27, 1997	
James Taylor	1994 Tour	September 16, 1994	
James Taylor	1996 Tour	August 17, 1996	
Jennifer Nettles	That Girl Tour	August 15, 2014	Brandy Clark
Jethro Tull	1998 Tour	September 25, 1998	Gov't Mule
Jimmy Buffett & The Coral Reefer Band	Recession Recess Tour	May 21, 1992	Evangeline
Joe Walsh	Songs for a Dying Planet Tour	June 2, 1993	Glenn Frey
John Anderson	Paradise Tour	September 27, 1996	
John Denver	Different Directions Tour	August 20, 1992	
John Fogerty	Premonition Tour	July 24, 1998	Sister 7
John Michael Montgomery	Leave a Mark Tour	October 4, 1998	
John Prine	1993 Tour	August 10, 1993	Nanci Griffith
John Tesh	Discovery Tour	July 7, 1996	
JoJo Siwa	Nickelodeon's JoJo Siwa D.R.E.A.M. The Tour	July 18, 2019	The Belles
Juice WRLD	A Deathrace for Love Tour	May 14, 2019	Ski Mask the Slump God, Roddy Ricch, & Lil Tjay
Kenny G	Breathless Tour	July 11, 1993	
Kenny Loggins	1993 Tour	August 31, 1993	
Khruangbin	Space Walk Tour	May 4, 2022	Toro y Moi
Kool & the Gang	1995 Tour	September 21, 1995	
Little Big Town	Tornado Tour	June 14, 2013	Holly Williams
Little Feat	Shake Me Up Tour	July 31, 1992	
Little Feat	1993 Tour	July 4, 1993	
Live	Throwing Copper Tour	July 23, 1995	Catherine Wheel & Buffalo Tom
Live	Secret Samadhi Tour	August 12, 1997	Luscious Jackson
Lorrie Morgan	Shakin' Things Up Tour	October 3, 1997	Joe Diffie & Sawyer Brown
Ludacris	Stone Soul Music and Food Festival	June 10, 2017	Meek Mill, Fat Joe & Remy Ma, & Khalid
The Lumineers	The Cleopatra World Tour	September 16, 2016	Børns & Rayland Baxter
Lynyrd Skynyrd	The Last Rebel Tour	August 17, 1993	Bad Company
Lynyrd Skynyrd	Endangered Species Tour	May 1, 1995	Bloodline
Lynyrd Skynyrd	20 Tour	July 27, 1997	Paul Rodgers & Corey Stevens
Lynyrd Skynyrd	1998 Tour	July 25, 1998	
Machine Gun Kelly	Tickets to My Downfall Tour	October 28, 2021	Jxdn
Mark Chesnutt	What a Way to Live Tour	September 22, 1994	
Mary Chapin Carpenter	1993 Tour	August 3, 1993	Hal Ketchum
Meat Loaf & His Neverland Express	Everything Louder Tour	May 23, 1994	Screamin' Cheetah Wheelies
Melissa Etheridge	Yes I Am Tour	August 16, 1994	Billy Pilgrim
Michael Bolton	The One Thing Tour	September 14, 1994	Dave Koz
The Monkees	30th Anniversary Tour	August 7, 1996	
The Moody Blues	1994 Tour	July 7, 1994	
Natalie Cole	Holly & Ivy Tour	July 22, 1995	
Nathaniel Rateliff and The Night Sweats		September 28, 2021	Bahamas
New Orleans Festival		July 30, 1993	
New Orleans Festival		July 31, 1994	
Norah Jones	Come Away with Me 20th Anniversary Tour	July 22, 2022	Emily King
The Oak Ridge Boys	1994 Tour	September 29, 1994	
Peabo Bryson	1996 Tour	April 27, 1996	
Phish	Hoist Tour	June 30, 1994	
Porter Robinson		October 14, 2021	
Raffi	Bananaphone Tour	August 31, 1994	
Raffi	Raffi Radio Tour	August 19, 1995	
Randy Travis	Full Circle Tour	October 4, 1996	Terri Clark
RatDog			
RatDog	1997 Tour	October 18, 1997	Big Head Todd and the Monsters, From Good Homes
REO Speedwagon	Can't Stop Rockin' Tour	July 21, 1996	Foreigner & Peter Frampton
Ricky Van Shelton	Love and Honor Tour	October 2, 1994	The Mavericks & Hal Ketchum
Rob Zombie	2017 Tour	October 6, 2017	
Robert Plant & The Sensational Spaceshifters	2018 Tour	June 10, 2018	Elle King
Sade	Love Deluxe World Tour	September 5, 1993	
Santana	Milagro Tour	October 27, 1992	
Sawyer Brown	This Thing Called Wantin' and Havin' It All Tour	September 27, 1995	
Skillet & Sevendust	Victorious War Tour	August 13, 2019	Pop Evil & Devour the Day
Smokin' Grooves Festival		July 9, 1997	
Spin Doctors	1993 Tour	June 20, 1993	Soul Asylum & Screaming Trees
Steve Miller Band	Wide River Tour	July 10, 1993	Paul Rodgers
Steve Miller Band	1994 Tour	July 22, 1994	
Steven Curtis Chapman	Heaven in the Real World Tour	September 15, 1994	Newsboys
Stevie Nicks	Street Angel Tour	August 6, 1994	Darden Smith
Sting	Ten Summoner's Tales Tour	May 30, 1993	Dada
The String Cheese Incident	Big Summer Classic Tour	July 15, 2005	
Styx	2019 Tour	June 21, 2019	
Tanya Tucker	Complicated Tour	October 5, 1997	Trace Adkins
Tesla	Psychotic Supper Tour	April 18, 1992	FireHouse
Tim McGraw	1995 Tour	April 23, 1995	Little Texas & BlackHawk
Tim McGraw	Spontaneous Combustion Tour	August 22, 1996	Faith Hill
Tina Turner	What's Love? Tour	August 4, 1993	Chris Isaak
Tina Turner	Wildest Dreams Tour	June 20, 1997	Cyndi Lauper
Tracy Lawrence	I See It Now Tour	October 1, 1995	Kathy Mattea & Rick Trevino
Traffic	Far from Home Reunion Tour	August 20, 1994	The Subdudes
Travis Tritt	T-R-O-U-B-L-E Tour	July 29, 1993	Trisha Yearwood & Little Texas
Travis Tritt	Ten Feet Tall and Bulletproof Tour	September 9, 1994	Joe Diffie & Lee Roy Parnell
Travis Tritt	1995 Tour	August 31, 1995	Marty Stuart & Doug Stone
Travis Tritt	1998 Tour	April 25, 1998	Diamond Rio & Dixie Chicks
Turnstile	Grey Day Tour	October 5, 2021	
Umphrey's McGee	2019 Tour	July 19, 2019	Big Something
Van Halen	The Balance "Ambulance" Tour	August 30, 1995	Our Lady Peace
Van Halen	III Tour	August 28, 1998	Kenny Wayne Shepherd
Vince Gill	High Lonesome Sound Tour	May 17, 1996	Patty Loveless
Vince Gill	1997 Tour	August 24, 1997	Bryan White
Virginia Symphony Orchestra	The Music of Andrew Lloyd Webber	June 9, 1995	
Virginia Symphony Orchestra	The Music of Led Zeppelin	June 7, 1996	
Wu-Tang Clan	25th Anniversary of 36 Chambers Tour	June 18, 2019	
Weezer	XL102 Big Field Day	May 13, 2017	PVRIS, Bob Moses, & Dreamers
Wynonna Judd	1994 Tour	August 26, 1994	Tim McGraw & BlackHawk
Wynonna Judd	Revelations Tour	October 6, 1996	BlackHawk
Yanni	Yanni Live, The Symphony Concerts 1993 Tour	July 21, 1993	
Yanni	Yanni Live, The Symphony Concerts 1995 Tour	July 11, 1995	
Yes	Talk Tour	August 24, 1994	
Yes	An Evening with YES: Celebrating 50 Years of YES Tour	July 24, 2018	
Young the Giant & Fitz and the Tantrums	2019 Tour	June 25, 2019	COIN
Zach Bryan	2022 Tour	June 16, 2022	Charles Wesley Godwin
ZZ Top	Mean Rhythm Global Tour	June 25, 1997	Cheap Trick

== See also ==
- List of contemporary amphitheatres
