= The Good Life (The Band Perry song) =

Single by The Band Perry
- Released: July 12, 2019
- Genre: Electropop
- Length: 3:20
- Label: TheTenTwentySix
- Songwriters: Owen Thomas; Kimberly Perry; Neil Perry; Reid Perry
- Producers: ARTART; Rick Rubin

The Band Perry singles chronology
"Stay in the Dark" (2017)	"The Good Life" (2019)

"The Good Life" is a song recorded by American musical trio The Band Perry. Written by the Kimberly, Reid and Neil, along with Owen Thomas, the song marks as their first release after leaving the Interscope Records label. It was released to digital retailers on July 12, 2019.

== Composition ==
I want you to know that this song was written during a toxic and incredibly difficult time in my life, but I’m singing it to you now with the voice of a woman who has completely regained a strong sense of self, rebuilt her womanhood, and is grateful to have learned so much.

— Kimberly Perry,

This is a song writing about infidelity Perry experienced, who has been divorced with former MLB player J.P. Arencibia. The song is written by Owen Thomas with the Perry siblings, and was described as an electropop, EDM work featuring with quirky, industrial beat and club-ready vocal processing.

== Music video ==
The trio dropped the visualizer for the track at the same day of its digital release. The official music video was premiered on YouTube channel on July 29, 2019. Directed by Janell Shirtcliff, the video features with a mysterious plot beginning with the lead singer Kimberly Perry driving an old car, as to running away from the bad relationship. Three women with angel wings are spotted in the backseat of her car. She's headed to a secluded spot marked by her brother, all the while singing about a guy who broke her heart. Once the car arrives, the Perry siblings are joined by a group of angels, as if they were called on for revenge.
