= Stay in the Dark =

Single by The Band Perry

from the album My Bad Imagination
- Released: February 3, 2017
- Recorded: 2016
- Genre: Power pop
- Length: 3:14
- Label: Interscope; Mercury Nashville
- Songwriters: Jenna Andrews; Benny Cassette; Kimberly Perry; Neil Perry; Reid Perry
- Producer: Benny Cassette

The Band Perry singles chronology
"Comeback Kid" (2016)	"Stay in the Dark" (2017)	"The Good Life" (2019)

"Stay in the Dark" is a song recorded by American musical trio The Band Perry for their unreleased third studio album, My Bad Imagination (2017). Written by Kimberly, Reid and Neil, along with Jenna Andrews and Benny Cassette, the song follows "Comeback Kid" as their second release on the Interscope Records label and was intended to be the lead single for the unreleased album My Bad Imagination. It was released to digital retailers on February 3, 2017 and to American hot adult contemporary radio stations on February 27, 2017.

== Background ==
In August 2015, The Band Perry released "Live Forever" as the purported lead single for a forthcoming album. The song's strong pop influence "polarized" fans and led to rumors the group was "going pop" and abandoning their roots in country music, which the group later refuted. Billboard announced in March 2016 that The Band Perry had parted ways with the Big Machine Label Group due to creative differences regarding their new music. That May, the group announced that they had signed with Interscope Records and were working on a crossover album, titled Heart + Beat, that was scheduled for release in the fall of 2016. Their first single on the new label, "Comeback Kid" was released on August 1, 2016 and became the group's lowest-charting single to date.

Following a few month hiatus, the group announced in February 2017 that they would release their "first pop album", My Bad Imagination, sometime that year. The album will include "Stay in the Dark" but presumably not any previous releases.

== Release and promotion ==
The group teased the release through Instagram posts with the caption, "NEW TRACK TONIGHT", on February 2, 2017. The black and white posts were styled by creative director Nicola Formachetti and photographed by Steven Klein. Featuring a "drastic aesthetic departure" from both the neon-colored promotional art for their scrapped Heart + Beat album and the "muted neutrals" on the cover art for "Comeback Kid", the photos "showcase the band's darker edges," according to Rolling Stone.

"Stay in the Dark" was released to digital retailers though Interscope Records and Mercury Nashville (or Polydor Records in select markets) on February 3, 2017. Despite being recorded during the same sessions as their 2016 single, "Comeback Kid", news outlets are reporting "Stay in the Dark" as the first release from My Bad Imagination. Interscope serviced the song to hot adult contemporary radio in the United States on February 27, 2017. With My Bad Imagination being touted as the group's "first pop album," this single marks the group's first pop-exclusive release.

== Chart performance ==
"Stay in the Dark" debuted at number 33 on the Billboard Adult Pop Songs chart dated March 25, 2017 and was the week's highest debut.

== Charts ==
Chart (2017)	Peak position
Sweden Heatseeker (Sverigetopplistan)	18
US Adult Pop Airplay (Billboard)	23

== Release history ==
Country	Date	Format	Label	Ref.
Worldwide	February 3, 2017	Digital download	Interscope; Mercury Nashville; Polydor	
United States	February 27, 2017	Hot adult contemporary	Interscope	
