= Comeback Kid (The Band Perry song) =

Single by The Band Perry
- Released: August 1, 2016
- Genre: Country
- Length: 3:51
- Label: Mercury Nashville; Interscope
- Songwriters: Kimberly Perry; Reid Perry; Neil Perry
- Producers: The Band Perry; Benny Cassette

The Band Perry singles chronology
"Live Forever" (2015)	"Comeback Kid" (2016)	"Stay in the Dark" (2017)

"Comeback Kid" is a song recorded by American country music group The Band Perry. It was released on August 1, 2016, by Mercury Nashville and Interscope as the purported second single off their unreleased third studio album; however, in February 2017, it was revealed "Stay in the Dark" was the first track to be released from the album.

== Background ==
The song was written by Kimberly Perry, Reid Perry and Neil Perry, and co-produced by The Band Perry and Benny Cassette. It was released on August 1, 2016.

== Chart performance ==
"Comeback Kid" reached a peak of No. 39 on the Billboard Country Airplay chart, and failed to reach the Top 40 on the Billboard Hot Country Songs chart. The song is their lowest-charting single to date.

Chart (2016)	Peak position
US Country Airplay (Billboard)	39
US Hot Country Songs (Billboard)	42
