= American Beautiful =

Single by The Henningsens

from the album The Henningsens
- Released: December 17, 2012
- Genre: Country
- Length: 3:09
- Label: Arista Nashville
- Songwriter(s): Brett Beavers; Brian Henningsen; Clara Henningsen; Aaron Henningsen
- Producer(s): Paul Worley

The Henningsens singles chronology
"American Beautiful" (2012)	"I Miss You" (2013)

"American Beautiful" is a song recorded by American country music group The Henningsens. It was released in December 2012.

== Critical reception ==
Billy Dukes of Taste of Country gave the song three and a half stars out of five, writing that it "It’s clear there is real, reliable talent in this country threesome, and they’ve done the hard work necessary to earn a record deal and have their single released to radio."

== Chart performance ==
"American Beautiful" debuted at Number 51 on the Country Airplay chart.

Chart (2012–2013)	Peak position
US Billboard Bubbling Under Hot 100 Singles	7
US Country Airplay (Billboard)	17
US Hot Country Songs (Billboard)	29

=== Year-end charts ===
Chart (2013)	Position
US Country Airplay (Billboard)	68
US Hot Country Songs (Billboard)	87
