= If I Die Young Pt. 2 =

Single by Kimberly Perry

from the EP Bloom
- Released: May 5, 2023
- Genre: Country
- Length: 3:24
- Label: RECORDS/Columbia
- Songwriters: Kimberly Perry; Nicolle Galyon; Jimmy Robbins
- Producer: Jimmy Robbins

"If I Die Young Pt. 2" is a song written by Kimberly Perry, Nicolle Galyon, and Jimmy Robbins as a follow-up to The Band Perry's 2010 single "If I Die Young". It was recorded by Kimberly Perry and released in May 2023 as her debut solo single.

== Content ==
On March 27, 2023, The Band Perry announced that they were going on a hiatus to focus on solo work. Following this announcement, Kimberly Perry announced her debut solo EP Bloom alongside the release of "If I Die Young Pt. 2".

The song serves as a sequel to the original "If I Die Young" that she wrote at age 25 for The Band Perry, though she enlisted the help of Nicolle Galyon and Jimmy Robbins to create its successor. It retains the same chorus as the original song, but with updated verses, and they reframed the narrative from a young woman thinking about how her death would affect everyone else to one contemplating how the death of her mother would affect her. On writing "If I Die Young Pt. 2" at age 39, Perry decided "there needed to be a sequel. But, it wasn't being told. I had this collective wisdom at this point that some dreams come true. Some dreams haven't come true yet. But, the full journey of life was just like, 'Hey, guess what? Remember when you said there was enough time? There's never gonna be enough time.'"

Perry made her solo debut on the Grand Ole Opry on May 6, 2023.

== Music video ==
A visual accompaniment to the song dubbed "The Vibe Film" was directed by Claire Schaper and released alongside the track. In the music video, a pregnant Perry is seen performing the song in a pink gown in a farmhouse with her acoustic guitar, lying in a field of wildflowers, and walking the banks of a creek, which is a nod to the visual for "If I Die Young" in which Perry floated downstream in a canoe.

== Chart performance ==
"If I Die Young Pt. 2" debuted at number 31 on the Billboard Country Airplay chart dated May 20, 2023.

== Charts ==
Chart performance for "If I Die Young Pt. 2"
Chart (2023)	Peak position
US Country Airplay (Billboard)	31
