= The Band Perry (album) =

Studio album by The Band Perry
- Released: October 12, 2010
- Recorded: 2009–2010
- Studios: OmniSound Studios, Nashville, TN
- Genres: Country pop, country, bluegrass
- Length: 39:45
- Label: Republic Nashville
- Producers: Nathan Chapman; Paul Worley

The Band Perry chronology
The Band Perry EP (2010)	The Band Perry (2010)	Pioneer (2013)

Singles from The Band Perry
- 1. "Hip to My Heart" Released: November 16, 2009; 2. "If I Die Young" Released: June 8, 2010; 3. "You Lie" Released: January 18, 2011; 4. "All Your Life" Released: August 8, 2011; 5. "Postcard from Paris" Released: March 5, 2012

The Band Perry is the debut studio album by American country music group The Band Perry. The album includes five songs from the band's digital EP The Band Perry EP, which was released in April 2010. The album produced five singles: "Hip to My Heart", "If I Die Young", "You Lie", "All Your Life", and "Postcard from Paris". Of these, "If I Die Young" and "All Your Life" were number one hits on the Billboard Hot Country Songs chart. A remastered edition of the album was released on August 29, 2025, featuring three remixes of their popular hit, "If I Die Young" (including the unreleased full studio track).

== Critical reception ==
Professional ratings
Review scores
Source	Rating
AllMusic	3/5 stars
Country Weekly	3/5 stars
Entertainment Weekly	B
The Guardian	2/5 stars
Roughstock	4.5/5 stars

Thom Jurek of Allmusic gave the album a three-star rating out of five, saying that the album was "carefully crafted" and thought that the singles were among the strongest tracks on it. Country Weekly reviewer Jessica Phillips said that the album was "more introspective and engrossing than typical radio fare", and praised Kimberly's "unpolished" voice, but thought that some songs had "aimless" lyrics. She also gave it three stars out of five. Also giving it a positive review, Michael McCall of the Associated Press compared the band favorably to Taylor Swift and Lady Antebellum, and said that the album's "emphasis is on easygoing, back-porch music." BBC Music's Sid Smith cautioned that "whilst there’s no faulting the tightly-drilled performances turned in by the trio and an array of skilled sessioneers, the delivery has a by-the-numbers feel that’s workman-like rather than inspired", yet he reasoned that "perhaps the fault lies with a set of committee-written tunes that are well-worn and overly-familiar." Lastly, Smith said that with respect to this album its "blandness becomes difficult to ignore".

At Entertainment Weekly, Leah Greenblatt found that the listener needs to "think of them as a more modest, homegrown Lady Antebellum" that comes "with twangier roots and dustier boots." However, Maddy Costa at The Guardian evoked how "their country-rock sound has been lacquered to a high gloss, burying Neil Perry's mandolin and Stuart Duncan's fiddle beneath slick guitar, domineering pop rhythms and sickly strings. Frontwoman Kimberley Perry has a belter of a voice, but it's too clean to communicate real emotion." Costa found only one good track, which was "Double Heart" that she suggested what the "band could be", and the song has "one part sleazy rock'n'roll, two parts country sass and snarl, it has more personality than the rest of the album put together." Roughstock's Bobby Peacock did not agree with Costa, when he wrote that this is a "surprisingly diverse debut album", and this is done with Kimberly voice that is "matched perfectly to an uncluttered, mostly acoustic production that's clean without being slick." Furthermore, Peacock argued that Kimberly as being the featured songwriter "has a solid command of the language, she sometimes falls into a Clint Black-esque trap of getting so wrapped up in the turns of phrase that the storyline gets a little ensnarled; however, even when these pitfalls occur, the songwriting is still quite impressive." Lastly, Peacock told that "the songs are vaguely reminiscent of Taylor Swift's exuberance, lyrical detail and boy-craziness, not to mention her way with a catchy melody."

== Commercial performance ==
The album debuted at number 4 on the US Billboard 200 chart upon its release, selling 53,000 copies in its first week. It was eventually certified platinum by the Recording Industry Association of America (RIAA) for sales of over a million copies in the United States. As of May 2013, the album has sold 1,505,000 copies in the US.

== Track listing ==
No.	Title	Writer(s)	Length
1.	"You Lie"	Aaron Henningsen, Brian Henningsen, Clara Henningsen	3:36
2.	"Hip to My Heart"	Brett Beavers, Kimberly Perry, Neil Perry, Reid Perry	3:00
3.	"If I Die Young"	K. Perry	3:44
4.	"All Your Life"	B. Henningsen, C. Henningsen	3:52
5.	"Miss You Being Gone"	A. Henningsen, B. Henningsen, C. Henningsen, K. Perry, N. Perry, R. Perry	2:56
6.	"Double Heart"	Beavers, K. Perry, N. Perry, R. Perry	3:38
7.	"Postcard from Paris"	Jeff Cohen, Kara DioGuardi, K. Perry, N. Perry, R. Perry	3:36
8.	"Walk Me Down the Middle"	K. Perry, N. Perry, R. Perry	4:01
9.	"Independence"	A. Henningsen, B. Henningsen, C. Henningsen, K. Perry, N. Perry, R. Perry	3:37
10.	"Quittin' You"	K. Perry, N. Perry, R. Perry	3:20
11.	"Lasso"	A. Henningsen, B. Henningsen, C. Henningsen, K. Perry, N. Perry, R. Perry	4:25
Total length:			39:45

North American iTunes Store pre-order bonus track
No.	Title	Writer(s)	Length
12.	"Queen Maybelline"	Rodney Clawson, John Rich	4:28

International bonus track
No.	Title	Writer(s)	Length
12.	"If I Die Young" (pop mix)	K. Perry	3:35

2025 remaster bonus tracks
No.	Title	Writer(s)	Length
12.	"Queen Maybelline"	Rodney Clawson, John Rich	4:28
13.	"If I Die Young" (unedited version)	K. Perry	4:26
14.	"If I Die Young" (alternate edit)	K. Perry	4:05
15.	"If I Die Young" (pop mix)	K. Perry	3:35

== Personnel ==
The Band Perry

- Kimberly Perry – lead vocals; acoustic guitar (2)
- Neil Perry – backing vocals; mandolin (2, 4, 7, 9 10)
- Reid Perry – backing vocals; bass (2, 4, 7, 9, 10)

Additional musicians

- Pat Buchanan – electric guitar (1, 5, 6, 11); papoose (3)
- Chris Chaney – bass guitar (8)
- Nathan Chapman – acoustic guitar, electric guitar, banjo, piccolo, percussion (2)
- Chad Cromwell – drums (1, 3, 5, 6, 11)
- Dorian Crozier – drums (8)
- Eric Darken – percussion (4, 7, 9, 10)
- Dan Dugmore – pedal steel guitar (1, 3, 5, 6, 11)
- Stuart Duncan – fiddle (1, 3, 6, 7, 8, 9, 11)
- Shannon Forrest – drums (2, 4, 7, 9, 10)
- Paul Franklin – pedal steel guitar (8)
- Rok Golob – string conductor (8)
- Rob Hajacos – fiddle (2)
- Wes Hightower – additional vocals (1, 3)
- Mike Johnson – pedal steel guitar (4, 7, 9, 10)
- Tim Lauer – piano (1, 5, 11); Hammond B-3 organ (1, 3, 5, 6, 11); accordion (3, 6)
- Tim Pierce – electric guitar (8)
- Michael Rhodes – bass guitar (1, 3, 5, 6, 11)
- Rokulus Strings – strings (8)
- Matt Serletic – cimbalom, piano, Hammond B-3 organ, accordion, programming (8)
- Tomaz Stular – contrabass (8)
- Bryan Sutton – acoustic guitar (1, 4, 5, 6, 7, 9, 10, 11); banjo (3, 4)
- Ilya Toshinsky – electric guitar (4, 7, 9); acoustic guitar, mandolin (8); 12-string acoustic guitar (8, 10)
- Biff Watson – acoustic guitar (1, 3, 5, 6, 11)
- Paul Worley – electric guitar (5, 11)

== Charts ==
=== Weekly charts ===
Chart (2010–2012)	Peak position
UK Albums (Official Charts)	46
UK Country Albums (Official Charts)	1
US Billboard 200	4
US Top Country Albums (Billboard)	2

=== Year-end charts ===
Chart (2010)	Position
US Top Country Albums (Billboard)	46
Chart (2011)	Position
US Billboard 200	30
US Top Country Albums (Billboard)	7
Chart (2012)	Position
US Billboard 200	38
US Top Country Albums (Billboard)	11

=== Decade-end charts ===
Chart (2010–2019)	Position
US Billboard 200	157
US Top Country Albums (Billboard)	21

=== Singles ===
Year	Single	Peak chart positions						Certifications (sales threshold)
Year	Single	US Country	US	US AC	US Adult	US Pop	CAN	Certifications (sales threshold)
2009	"Hip to My Heart"^{[A]}	20	101	—	—	—	—	
2010	"If I Die Young"	1	14	1	4	12	48	CAN: Platinum; US: 6× Platinum
2011	"You Lie"	2	42	—	—	—	—	US: Platinum
2011	"All Your Life"	1	37	—	—	—	62	US: Platinum
2012	"Postcard from Paris"	6	60	—	—	—	—	US: Gold
"—" denotes releases that did not chart

=== Notes ===
- A "Hip to My Heart" did not enter the Billboard Hot 100 but peaked on the Bubbling Under Hot 100 Singles chart at number one.

== Certifications ==
Region	Certification	Certified units/sales
Canada (Music Canada)	Platinum	80,000^{^}
United States (RIAA)	Platinum	1,000,000^{^}
^{^} Shipments figures based on certification alone.
