= Country music awards =

Country music awards may refer to:

== American Music Awards ==
- American Music Award (1973–present), created by Dick Clark
- American Music Award for Favorite Country Album
- American Music Award for Favorite Country Band/Duo/Group
- American Music Award for Favorite Country Female Artist
- American Music Award for Favorite Country Male Artist
- American Music Award for Favorite Country New Artist, discontinued after 2003
- American Music Award for Favorite Country Single, discontinued after 1995

== Grammy Awards ==
- Grammy Award (1959–present)
- Grammy Award for Best Bluegrass Album
- Grammy Award for Best Country & Western Recording
- Grammy Award for Best Country Album
- Grammy Award for Best Country Collaboration with Vocals
- Grammy Award for Best Country Instrumental Performance
- Grammy Award for Best Country Performance by a Duo or Group with Vocal, awarded from 1970 to 2011
- Grammy Award for Best Country Song
- Grammy Award for Best Female Country Vocal Performance
- Grammy Award for Best Male Country Vocal Performance, awarded between 1965 and 2011
- Grammy Award for Best New Country & Western Artist, presented in 1965 and 1966
- Grammy Award for Best Southern, Country or Bluegrass Gospel Album

== Canadian awards ==
- Canadian Country Music Awards (1982–present)
- Juno Award (1970–present)
- Juno Award for Country Recording of the Year

== Other ==
- Academy of Country Music Awards (1965–present)
- American Country Awards (2010–2013), voted by fans online
- American Country Countdown Awards (2014–present), based on album sales, touring data, and radio airplay
- CMT Music Awards by Country Music Television (2002–present)
- Country Music Association Awards (1967–present)
- Country Music Awards of Australia (1973–present)
