= Pioneer (The Band Perry album) =

Studio album by The Band Perry
- Released: April 2, 2013
- Genre: Country
- Length: 46:15 (standard edition); 64:43 (Target deluxe edition)
- Label: Republic Nashville
- Producer: Dann Huff

The Band Perry chronology
The Band Perry (2010)	Pioneer (2013)	Coordinates (2018)

Singles from Pioneer
- 1. "Better Dig Two" Released: October 29, 2012; 2. "Done" Released: March 11, 2013; 3. "Don't Let Me Be Lonely" Released: August 26, 2013; 4. "Chainsaw" Released: March 3, 2014

Pioneer is the second studio album by American country music group The Band Perry. It was released on April 2, 2013, via Republic Records. A deluxe edition with four bonus tracks and a special red album cover with an autograph from each band member was made available at Target stores the same day. The Band Perry co-wrote nine of the album's twelve tracks. The album has produced four singles: "Better Dig Two", "Done", "Don't Let Me Be Lonely" and "Chainsaw". As of October 2015, the album has sold 619,000 copies in the United States.

It is the final album to feature brothers Neil and Reid Perry who left in 2025.

== Critical reception ==
Professional ratings
Review scores
Source	Rating
AllMusic	3/5 stars
Country Weekly	A−
Entertainment Weekly	B
Music Is My Oxygen	5/5 stars
The Oakland Press	3/4 stars
Rolling Stone	3/5 stars
Roughstock	4/5 stars
The Salt Lake Tribune	B
Taste of Country	4/5 stars
USA Today	3.5/4 stars

Pioneer received generally favorable reviews from critics. On the review aggregator site Metacritic, the album currently holds a score of 72, indicating "generally favorable reviews", based on 7 reviews. AllMusic music critic Stephen Thomas Erlewine said that the album has "a swagger that underpins" it, which "retains a sense of palpable defiance even in the quietest moments", and describes "[Kimberly's] vigor lending passion to music that is deliberately designed to appeal to the widest possible audience as it blurs the line between contemporary country and pop". He added that it causes "some seriously odd juxtapositions". In addition, Erlewine found that "as good as the by-the-books ballads and rocking country are, the moments when the façade slips a bit make this worth hearing as an album and not a collection of singles." At Entertainment Weekly, Melissa Maerz evoked how "it's fun to hear her get those linens dirty" on this album. Rob Burkhardt of Music Is My Oxygen said the album built "on the foundation laid by the first album and taking things to the next level."

At Country Weekly, Jon Freeman called it clearly "time well spent" on making the album, which leads the band in furthering their "stadium-sized ambitions", and they said that the album is just below "outstanding" with an A−. In addition, Freeman said that Pioneer's "overall spirit of adventure is summed up in the gorgeous" track entitled "Pioneer", which that is because it starts off "sweet and delicate," and the song "offers a message of encouragement to be bold in the face of uncertainty and doubt as it builds to a thrilling crescendo." Taste of Country's Billy Dukes evoked how the album "is just as dramatic, yet dramatically more steady than their debut effort" that "holds no shortage of styles and surprises, even a lilting folk song in the title track." Dukes noted that "for some, this will be the highlight of the project — one can be sure very few people will agree on a favorite", and the album has "ambitious" lyrics that "shows a maturity largely unmatched by a group only two albums into a blossoming career." Dukes stated that the band had some sporadically "bold choices", which are "rough around the edges," at the same time "the collection is more than strong enough to justify a headlining tour". David Burger of The Salt Lake Tribune said that The Band Perry "show a confidence unusual for a group so young". At Rolling Stone, Will Hermes found this album to contain "goth-iness", which is because the siblings "are remarkably death-obsessed", and called this release a "perky, rocked-up country-pop set."

At The Oakland Press, Gary Graff exclaimed "Step aside, Taylor, and put the kerosene down, Miranda — Kimberly Perry is about to become country music’s new man-slaying warrior for women done wrong" on the band's second offering. However, Graff said that this "youthful group is still occasionally wanting in the lyric department, but 'Pioneer' mostly shows that the path the trio blazed with its debut was no mere fluke." Roughstock's Matt Bjorke alluded to how "Pioneer doesn't sound like anything else in Country Music and that...should be...enough to help keep the family band around for more than a few more years to come." Furthermore, Bjorke contended that "we might be witnessing the next country/pop crossover to superstardom a la Taylor Swift" because they "could very well be...a Pop band if they didn't love mandolins, banjos, fiddles and steel guitars as much as they do (must be that East Tennessee upbringing)." At the USA Today, Jerry Shriver stated this "robust effort from the sibling trio centers on obsessive love, and Kimberly Perry sounds unhinged and revenge-thirsty", yet the album has "moments of vulnerability, then it's back to feeling all apocalyptic. Strong songs, potent production. But dang, girl."

== Track listing ==
No.	Title	Writer(s)	Length
1.	"Better Dig Two"	Brandy Clark, Shane McAnally, Trevor Rosen	3:15
2.	"Done"	Reid Perry, Neil Perry, John Davidson, Jacob Bryant	3:25
3.	"Don't Let Me Be Lonely"	Sarah Buxton, Rodney Clawson, Chris Tompkins	4:11
4.	"Pioneer"	Kimberly Perry, R. Perry, N. Perry, Brian Henningsen, Clara Henningsen, Aaron Henningsen	4:18
5.	"Forever Mine Nevermind"	K. Perry, R. Perry, N. Perry, Brad Paisley	3:56
6.	"Night Gone Wasted"	K. Perry, R. Perry, N. Perry, B. Henningsen, C. Henningsen, A. Henningsen	3:37
7.	"I Saw a Light"	K. Perry, R. Perry, N. Perry, B. Henningsen, C. Henningsen, A. Henningsen	4:08
8.	"Mother Like Mine"	K. Perry, R. Perry, N. Perry	3:51
9.	"Chainsaw"	McAnally, Josh Osborne, Matthew Ramsey	3:47
10.	"I'm a Keeper"	K. Perry, R. Perry, N. Perry, B. Henningsen, C. Henningsen, A. Henningsen	3:30
11.	"Back to Me Without You"	K. Perry, R. Perry, N. Perry, B. Henningsen, C. Henningsen, A. Henningsen	3:57
12.	"End of Time"	K. Perry, R. Perry, N. Perry, B. Henningsen, C. Henningsen, A. Henningsen	4:19
Total length:			46:15

Target and international deluxe edition bonus tracks
No.	Title	Writer(s)	Length
13.	"Once Upon a Time"	K. Perry, Eric Bazilian, Rob Hyman	4:38
14.	"Lucky Ones"	K. Perry, Lynn A. Nichols, Jeremy Bose	4:47
15.	"Peaches and Caroline"	K. Perry, Sam Mizell	4:24
16.	"Gonna Be OK"	K. Perry, Nichols, Bose	4:39
Total length:			64:43

== Personnel ==
Adapted from Pioneer liner notes.

The Band Perry

- Kimberly Perry – lead vocals
- Neil Perry – bouzouki, mandolin, background vocals
- Reid Perry – bass guitar, background vocals

Additional musicians

- J.T. Corenflos – electric guitar
- Eric Darken – percussion
- Dan Dugmore – steel guitar, dobro
- Stuart Duncan – fiddle
- Paul Franklin – steel guitar, sitar
- Jim Hoke – penny whistle
- Dann Huff – 12-string electric guitar, electric guitar
- David Huff – percussion, programming
- Charlie Judge – Hammond B-3 organ, keyboards, loop programming, piano, synthesizer
- Jerry McPherson – electric guitar
- Cherie Oakley – background vocals
- Aaron Sterling – drums
- Ilya Toshinsky – banjo, acoustic guitar, resonator guitar

== Charts ==
=== Weekly charts ===
Chart (2013)	Peak position
Australian Albums (ARIA)	37
Canadian Albums (Billboard)	3
UK Albums (Official Charts)	94
UK Country Albums (Official Charts)	2
US Billboard 200	2
US Top Country Albums (Billboard)	1

=== Singles ===
Year	Single	Peak chart positions				
Year	Single	US Country	US Country Airplay	US	CAN Country	CAN
2012	"Better Dig Two"	1	1	28	1	42
2013	"Done"	8	1	43	1	48
2013	"Don't Let Me Be Lonely"	9	2	59	1	58
2014	"Chainsaw"	20	10	86	6	88

=== Year-end charts ===
Chart (2013)	Position
US Billboard 200	55
US Top Country Albums (Billboard)	12

Chart (2014)	Position
US Top Country Albums (Billboard)	36

== Certifications ==
Region	Certification	Certified units/sales
Canada (Music Canada)	Gold	40,000^{^}
United States (RIAA)	Gold	619,000
^{^} Shipments figures based on certification alone.
