= The Henningsens =

American country music trio

- Origin: Atwood, Illinois
- Genre: Country
- Years active: 2008–2016
- Label: Arista Nashville
- Past members: Aaron Henningsen; Brian Henningsen; Clara Henningsen

The Henningsens were an American country music trio consisting of Brian Henningsen, his son Aaron, and daughter Clara. All three were vocalists and songwriters. The trio released their debut single, "American Beautiful", for Arista Nashville in late 2012.

== History ==
The Henningsens, consisting of Brian Henningsen and two of his children, Aaron and Clara, originated in Illinois, where Brian played in bands off and on throughout the 1980s and began songwriting in the early 1990s. He met with music publishers in Nashville in the mid-1990s but he put his career on hold to take over the family farm.

In 2008 at church, Aaron met Wynonna Judd's husband and Highway 101 member Cactus Moser, who in turn shared The Henningsens' demo recordings with producer Paul Worley. The Henningsens co-wrote The Band Perry's singles "You Lie" and "All Your Life", as well as several album tracks on The Band Perry. Their collaborative efforts would later yield several album cuts on Pioneer, including the title track, "Night Gone Wasted", "I Saw a Light", "I'm a Keeper", "Back to Me Without You", and "End of Time". Other songs that The Henningsens wrote include "Love It Out Loud" for Wynonna Judd, "Alone" for Sara Evans, and "Six Gold Coins" by Highway 101. They then signed to Arista Nashville and began working with Worley on their debut album.

On December 17, 2012, the trio released their debut single (and album title track) "American Beautiful". Billy Dukes of Taste of Country gave the single 3.5 stars out of 5. A self-titled EP was released on May 28, 2013. A full-length album, American Beautiful, was scheduled to be released on July 2, 2013, but has since been postponed.

Clara married Jacob Calaway on May 4, 2013. The trio co-wrote Billy Currington's 2015 single "Drinkin' Town with a Football Problem".

On June 16, 2015 The Sims 4: Perfect Patio Stuff was released including a song recorded in simlish by The Henningsens, Like No One's Watching, radio station backyard (the non-simlish version was released in 2016 on World's On Fire).

In August 2015 The Henningsens parted ways with Sony Nashville.

In the same month they released a tribute song to honour the farmers, Why I Farm, in partnership with Beck's Hybrids.

On May, 11th The Henningsens announced the release of their first LP album, World's On Fire.

== Discography ==
=== Studio albums ===
Title	Album details
Our Family Christmas	Release date: November 17, 2014; Label: Arista Nashville; Formats: CD, music download
World's On Fire	Release date: June 2, 2016; Label: Self-released; Formats: CD, music download

=== Extended plays ===
Title	Album details	Peak chart positions	
Title	Album details	US Country	US Heat
The Henningsens	Release date: May 28, 2013; Label: Arista Nashville; Formats: CD, music download	53	19

=== Singles ===
Year	Single	Peak chart positions			Album
Year	Single	US Country	US Country Airplay	US Bubbling	Album
2012	"American Beautiful"	29	17	7	The Henningsens
2013	"I Miss You"	—	36	—	The Henningsens
2015	"Why I Farm"	—	—	—	World's On Fire
2016	"Sugar Rush"	—	—	—	World's On Fire
"—" denotes releases that did not chart

=== Music videos ===
Year	Video	Director
2013	"American Beautiful"	Darrin Dickerson
2013	"I Miss You"	Darrin Dickerson
2015	"Why I Farm"	Roger Pistole
