= Don't Let Me Be Lonely =

Single by The Band Perry

from the album Pioneer
- Released: August 26, 2013
- Genre: Country, country pop, heartland rock
- Length: 4:11 (album version/music video)
- Label: Republic Nashville
- Songwriter(s): Sarah Buxton; Rodney Clawson; Chris Tompkins
- Producer(s): Dann Huff

The Band Perry singles chronology
"Done" (2013)	"Don't Let Me Be Lonely" (2013)	"Chainsaw" (2014)

"Don't Let Me Be Lonely" is a song recorded by American country music group The Band Perry. It was released in August 2013 as the third single from their second album, Pioneer. The song was written by Sarah Buxton, Rodney Clawson and Chris Tompkins.

== Critical reception ==
Billy Dukes of Taste of Country gave the song four and a half stars out of five, writing that "the latest track may not be as instantly catchy [as "If I Die Young"], but it’s every bit the sharp songwriting effort." Dukes also wrote that "Kimberly Perry is a talented vocalist capable of projecting a wide variety of emotions, but vulnerability may be what she does best. Producer Dann Huff is wise to give her plenty of space, including a breakdown before the song’s final chorus during which she delivers the most heartbreaking of lyrics." Matt Bjorke of Roughstock gave the song four stars out of five, calling it "a savvy ballad that is lyrically deeper than its popish hooks suggest."

Kevin John Coyne of Country Universe was less positive, giving the song a C grade. He wrote that "Kimberly Perry doesn’t sell it, and the odd contours that usually make her sound so distinct and interesting are nowhere to be found," while adding "the bland production doesn’t help matters, either."

== Music video ==
The music video was directed by Ben Krebs and premiered in October 2013.

== Chart performance ==
"Don't Let Me Be Lonely" debuted at number 51 on the U.S. Billboard Country Airplay chart for the week of August 31, 2013. It also debuted at number 44 on the U.S. Billboard Hot Country Songs chart for the week of September 21, 2013. It also debuted at number 97 on the U.S. Billboard Hot 100 chart for the week of November 2, 2013. It also debuted at number 68 on the Canadian Hot 100 chart for the week of November 23, 2013. The song has sold 251,000 copies in the US as of January 2014.

Chart (2013–2014)	Peak position
Canada (Canadian Hot 100)	58
Canada Country (Billboard)	1
US Billboard Hot 100	59
US Country Airplay (Billboard)	2
US Hot Country Songs (Billboard)	9

=== Year-end charts ===
Chart (2013)	Position
US Country Airplay (Billboard)	69
US Hot Country Songs (Billboard)	88

Chart (2014)	Position
US Country Airplay (Billboard)	59
US Hot Country Songs (Billboard)	67
