= Live Forever (The Band Perry song) =

Single by The Band Perry
- Released: August 14, 2015
- Recorded: 2015
- Genre: Country pop; pop rock
- Length: 3:52
- Label: Republic Nashville
- Songwriter(s): Kimberly Perry; Reid Perry; Neil Perry; Jenna Andrews; Nadir Khayat; Jakke Erixson; Karl-Ola Kjellholm
- Producer(s): Dann Huff; RedOne

The Band Perry singles chronology
"Gentle on My Mind" (2014)	"Live Forever" (2015)	"Comeback Kid" (2016)

"Live Forever" is a song recorded by American country music group The Band Perry. It was released on August 14, 2015, by Republic Nashville as the purported lead single off their unreleased third studio album, Heart + Beat. "Live Forever" was the last single released by the band on the Big Machine Label Group before parting ways with the company in March 2016.

== Background ==
The song was written by Kimberly Perry, Reid Perry, Neil Perry, Jenna Andrews, Nadir Khayat, Jakke Erixson, Karl-Ola Kjellholm, and produced by Dann Huff and RedOne. It was first announced in the weekly Billboard Country Update on August 3, 2015 and was released on August 14, 2015.

== Critical reception ==
Country music blog Taste of Country reviewed the song positively, complimenting the anthemic nature of the song as well as its "big", "vivid" sound. In a starred review for Digital Journal, Markos Papadatos praised the trio for trying something new and noted the singles is "good regardless" of their shift in genre; he rated the song four stars out of five. Grady Smith of The Guardian was more critical, writing that the song "pushes the band away from the hearty style that made them great in the first place," and insisting that "Live Forever" is "not a country song – it's a bad pop song."

== Music video ==
The video for "Live Forever" premiered on CMT on August 15, 2015. It was filmed in La Vergne, Tennessee and directed by Colin Tilley.

== In popular culture ==
The song was chosen by Team USA to be their official song for the 2016 Summer Olympics.

== Live performances ==
The Band Perry premiered the song live on Good Morning America on August 14, 2015, and on the Today Show on April 27, 2016. The song was also performed at the Miss Universe 2015 competition.

== Track listing ==
- Digital download
1. "Live Forever" – 3:52

== Chart performance ==
Chart (2015–2016)	Peak position
Canada Country (Billboard)	30
US Adult Pop Airplay (Billboard)	32
US Country Airplay (Billboard)	27
US Hot Country Songs (Billboard)	29

== Release history ==
List of release dates, showing region, release format, label, and reference
Region	Date	Format(s)	Label	Ref
Canada	August 14, 2015	Digital download	Republic Nashville	
United States	August 14, 2015	Digital download	Republic Nashville	
United States	August 24, 2015	Country radio	Republic Nashville	
