= Postcard from Paris =

Single by The Band Perry

from the album The Band Perry
- Released: March 5, 2012
- Genre: Country, country pop
- Length: 3:36
- Label: Republic Nashville
- Songwriters: Jeff Cohen; Kara DioGuardi; Kimberly Perry; Neil Perry; Reid Perry
- Producer: Nathan Chapman

The Band Perry singles chronology
"All Your Life" (2011)	"Postcard from Paris" (2012)	"Better Dig Two" (2012)

"Postcard from Paris" is a song recorded by American country music group The Band Perry. It was released in March 2012 as the fifth and final single from the band's self-titled debut album. The song was written by group members Kimberly, Neil and Reid Perry with Jeff Cohen and Kara DioGuardi.

== Critical reception ==
Billy Dukes of Taste of Country gave the song four stars out of five, calling it "a beautiful song that finds a fresh way to spell love."

== Content ==
The protagonist has run into her ex while with her current boyfriend. This encounter triggers a flood of emotions leading her to realize that she will never feel as strongly for her boyfriend now, whom she compares to a postcard from Paris, than she did for her ex, who was the "real thing" to her.

== Music video ==
The music video was directed by David McClister and filmed in New Orleans. It premiered on CMT on June 1, 2012.

== Chart performance ==
"Postcard from Paris" debuted at number 52 on the U.S. Billboard Hot Country Songs chart for the week of March 24, 2012. It also debuted at number 100 on the U.S. Billboard Hot 100 chart for the week of May 19, 2012.

Chart (2012)	Peak position
US Billboard Hot 100	60
US Hot Country Songs (Billboard)	6

=== Year-end charts ===
Chart (2012)	Position
US Country Songs (Billboard)	30

== Certifications ==
Region	Certification	Certified units/sales
United States (RIAA)	Gold	500,000^{‡}
^{‡} Sales+streaming figures based on certification alone.
