= You Lie (The Band Perry song) =

Single by The Band Perry

from the album The Band Perry
- Released: January 18, 2011
- Genre: Country
- Length: 3:36
- Label: Republic Nashville
- Songwriter: Aaron Henningsen; Brian Henningsen; Clara Henningsen
- Producer: Paul Worley

The Band Perry singles chronology
"If I Die Young" (2010)	"You Lie" (2011)	"All Your Life" (2011)

"You Lie" is a song written by Aaron, Brian and Clara Henningsen, and recorded by The Band Perry, an American country music group. It was released in January 2011 as the third single from the band's self-titled debut album, and their second consecutive release to reach top ten on the Hot Country Songs chart.

== Content ==
The song's female narrator is angered by her husband's infidelity and constant lying, using similes to describe his lies. In the song's bridge, she throws his wedding ring in a river. The song was written by Aaron, Brian, and Clara Henningsen.

== Critical reception ==
Blake Boldt, in his review of the album on Engine 145, praised Kimberly's vocals on the track, saying that she "really shines when she's been wronged by her man." Bobby Peacock of Roughstock gave the single four-and-a-half stars out of five, saying that her vocal was "bold and expressive." He also stated that the song was "a little more mature" than the band's first two singles.

== Music video ==
David McClister directed the song's music video, which was released in February 2011. The video starts with an American Gothic scene, an Engagement Party for the narrator (Kimberly Perry). It shows the band performing at the dinner table, in front of a brown background, and in front of a tight red background. This video features Survivor: Redemption Island contestant Matt Elrod.

== Chart performance ==
"You Lie" debuted at number 59 on the Hot Country Songs charts dated for the week ending December 25, 2010. It soon reached number 2 on that chart, behind "Honey Bee" by Blake Shelton. It debuted at No. 80 on the Billboard Hot 100, and peaked at number 42 on that chart.

== Charts ==
=== Weekly charts ===
Chart (2011)	Peak position
US Billboard Hot 100	42
US Hot Country Songs (Billboard)	2

=== Year-end charts ===
Chart (2011)	Position
US Country Songs (Billboard)	5

== Certifications ==
Region	Certification	Certified units/sales
United States (RIAA)	Platinum	1,000,000^{^}
^{^} Shipments figures based on certification alone.
