= Hip to My Heart =

Single by The Band Perry

from the album The Band Perry
- Released: November 16, 2009
- Genre: Country
- Length: 3:00
- Label: Republic Nashville
- Songwriters: Brett Beavers; Kimberly Perry; Neil Perry; Reid Perry
- Producer: Nathan Chapman

The Band Perry singles chronology
"Hip to My Heart" (2009)	"If I Die Young" (2010)

"Hip to My Heart" is the debut song co-written and recorded by American country music group The Band Perry, an American country music group. It was released in November 2009 as the first single from the album The Band Perry. The song reached a peak of No. 20 on the country singles chart in early 2010. The song was written by Kimberly Perry, Neil Perry, Reid Perry and Brett Beavers.

== Critical reception ==
This song received a positive review from Matt Bjorke of Roughstock, who said that it was "charming" and that Kimberly's voice recalled Jennifer Nettles of Sugarland. Chris Neal of Country Weekly gave the single four stars out of five, calling it "an effervescent single that's just off-center enough to raise eyebrows while it's tickling eardrums."

== Chart performance ==
"Hip to My Heart" debuted at No. 52 on the Billboard Hot Country Songs chart dated for November 11, 2009. The song was a minor Top 20 hit, peaking at #20 in April 2010.

Chart (2009–2010)	Peak position
US Billboard Bubbling Under Hot 100 Singles	1
US Hot Country Songs (Billboard)	20
