= Chainsaw (The Band Perry song) =

Single by The Band Perry

from the album Pioneer
- Released: March 3, 2014
- Genre: Country
- Length: 3:47
- Label: Republic Nashville
- Songwriters: Shane McAnally; Josh Osborne; Matthew Ramsey
- Producer: Dann Huff

The Band Perry singles chronology
"Don't Let Me Be Lonely" (2013)	"Chainsaw" (2014)	"Gentle on My Mind" (2014)

"Chainsaw" is a song recorded by American country music group The Band Perry. It was released on March 3, 2014, as the fourth single from their second album, Pioneer. The song was written by Shane McAnally, Josh Osborne and Matthew Ramsey. To date, this is The Band Perry's final Top 10 hit.

Co-writer Matthew Ramsey originally recorded the song with his band Old Dominion.

== Content ==
"Chainsaw" is a song about a woman who, when jilted by her lover, destroys a tree into which the two carved their initials.

== Critical reception ==
Giving it a "B+", Tammy Ragusa of Country Weekly said that the song "casts the Perry siblings in a fiercer light" and was "clever, groovy, hooky, and fun".

== Music video ==
The music video for "Chainsaw" was filmed at two locations in Oregon: Silver Falls State Park near Silverton and the Bottle Factory, a local bar in Stayton. It was directed by David McClister and premiered in May 2014.

== Chart performance ==
Chart (2014)	Peak position
Canada Hot 100 (Billboard)	88
Canada Country (Billboard)	6
US Billboard Hot 100	86
US Country Airplay (Billboard)	10
US Hot Country Songs (Billboard)	20

=== Year-end charts ===
Chart (2014)	Position
US Country Airplay (Billboard)	60
US Hot Country Songs (Billboard)	61
