= Better Dig Two =

Country song by The Band Perry

Single by The Band Perry

from the album Pioneer
- Released: October 29, 2012
- Genre: Country rock
- Length: 3:12
- Label: Republic Nashville
- Songwriters: Brandy Clark; Shane McAnally; Trevor Rosen
- Producer: Dann Huff

The Band Perry singles chronology
"Postcard from Paris" (2012)	"Better Dig Two" (2012)	"Done" (2013)

"Better Dig Two" is a song recorded by American country music group The Band Perry. It was released in October 2012 as the first single from their second album, Pioneer. The song was written by Brandy Clark, Shane McAnally and Trevor Rosen.

== Content ==
The song is a mid-tempo in which the female narrator tells her husband that, should he die before she does, she would rather die and be buried next to him. She also threatens that if he betrays her, she'll kill him and then kill herself: "If the ties that bind ever do come loose / If forever ever ends for you / If that ring gets a little too tight / They might as well read me my last rites / Cause I'll go to heaven or I'll go to hell / Before I'll see you with someone else." The song is in A Dorian (i.e., an A minor scale with the sixth tone raised by a half-step). Kimberly Perry's vocals range from A3 to C5. The main accompaniment is banjo, electric guitar, and percussion.

== Critical reception ==
The song received positive reviews from music critics. Billy Dukes of Taste of Country gave the song three and a half stars out of five, writing that "cast in the shadow of the dark and stormy production … the gesture isn't sweet and romantic, but sort of unnerving." Matt Bjorke of Roughstock gave the song four stars, saying that "in addition to featuring Kimberly Perry's dynamic vocals we have a lound/soft [sic] melodic dynamic with banjos, mandolins, fiddles and electric guitars mixed in with a rock attitude and cries of steel guitars as well." Ben Foster of Country Universe gave the song a B grade, calling it "one of the most interesting and organic-sounding new tunes with a shot at radio airplay." Writing for Urban Country News, Liv Carter gave the song a 'thumbs up,' praising the "very modern, yet very rootsy, country sound."

== Music video ==
The music video was directed by Declan Whitebloom and filmed in Nashville. It premiered on CMT on December 4, 2012.

== Live performances ==
"Better Dig Two" was performed at Billboard Music Awards on May 19, 2013.

== Chart performance ==
"Better Dig Two" debuted at number 9 on the U.S. Billboard Hot Country Songs chart for the week of November 17, 2012. It also debuted at number 53 on the U.S. Billboard Hot 100 chart for the week of November 17, 2012. It also debuted at number 57 on the Canadian Hot 100 chart for the week of November 17, 2012. It has sold 1,457,000 copies in the US as of June 2013.

Chart (2012–2013)	Peak position
Canada Hot 100 (Billboard)	42
Canada Country (Billboard)	1
US Billboard Hot 100	28
US Country Airplay (Billboard)	1
US Hot Country Songs (Billboard)	1

=== Year-end charts ===
Chart (2013)	Position
US Country Airplay (Billboard)	29
US Hot Country Songs (Billboard)	12

== Certifications ==
Region	Certification	Certified units/sales
United States (RIAA)	2× Platinum	1,457,000
