= Done (The Band Perry song) =

Single by The Band Perry

from the album Pioneer
- Released: March 11, 2013
- Genre: Country
- Length: 3:25 (album version/music video); 3:16 (radio edit)
- Label: Republic Nashville
- Songwriters: Neil Perry; Reid Perry; John Davidson; Jacob Bryant
- Producer: Dann Huff

The Band Perry singles chronology
"Better Dig Two" (2012)	"Done" (2013)	"Don't Let Me Be Lonely" (2013)

"Done" (stylized as "DONE.") is a song recorded by American country music group The Band Perry. It was released in March 2013 as the second single from their second album Pioneer. Neil and Reid Perry co-wrote the song with John Davidson and Jacob Bryant. As of August 28, 2013, the first week in which the song was no longer ranked among the top 30 selling country digital singles, the single had sold 782,000 in the United States.

== Content ==
The song has its female narrator addressing a former lover, expressing her frustration at his behavior in their relationship, vowing to "give him what he deserves" in retaliation, and stating that she is done with him. "I don't wanna be your just for fun, don't wanna be under your thumb, all I wanna be is done."

== Critical reception ==
The song has achieved critical acclaim, with music critics labeling it as "very catchy" and one of the stand-out tracks on Pioneer. Billy Dukes of Taste of Country gave the song four and a half stars out of five, writing that it "is best enjoyed at an extremely loud volume. It's the type of song that sells concert tickets, because you know it's going to be quite a moment when the group gets to thrashing around on stage during the three-and-a-half minute track." Matt Bjorke of Roughstock gave the song four stars out of five, saying that "the melody puts the Up in Uptempo while Kimberly Perry delivers a vocal that's all attitude and sass."

The song was nominated for "Choice Music: Break-Up Song" at the 2013 Teen Choice Awards, but it lost to "Come and Get It" by Selena Gomez.

== Music video ==
The music video was directed by Declan Whitebloom and premiered in April 2013. It features the band performing the song with cut-scenes of the band playing a human chess game with other people and all the players coming together in the end.

== In popular culture ==
"Done" was covered by several artists including Holly Tucker of The Voice and Chloe Channell of America's Got Talent.

The song can be heard playing in the background of a viral Internet video recorded in 2013 by Tennessee resident James Mongiat of his then-wife, Whitney, throwing a temper tantrum begging him to take her to a local lake. In addition to its presence on the Internet, the video was also shown on the HLN program Raising America and the syndicated program Right This Minute.

== Live performances ==
The song was also sung live at the evening gown competition of the Miss Universe 2015 pageant.

== Chart performance ==
"Done" debuted at number 37 on the U.S. Billboard Country Airplay chart for the week of March 16, 2013. It also debuted at number 23 on the U.S. Billboard Hot Country Songs chart for the week of March 30, 2013. Moreover, it debuted at number 87 on the U.S. Billboard Hot 100 chart for the week of March 30, 2013. It also debuted at number 62 on the Canadian Hot 100 chart for the week of March 30, 2013.

Chart (2013)	Peak position
Canada Hot 100 (Billboard)	48
Canada Country (Billboard)	1
US Billboard Hot 100	43
US Country Airplay (Billboard)	1
US Hot Country Songs (Billboard)	8

=== Year-end charts ===
Chart (2013)	Position
US Country Airplay (Billboard)	9
US Hot Country Songs (Billboard)	21
US Radio Songs (Billboard)	72

== Certifications ==
Region	Certification	Certified units/sales
United States (RIAA)	Platinum	713,000
