= If I Die Young =

2010 single by the Band Perry

Single by the Band Perry

from the album The Band Perry
- Released: June 8, 2010
- Genre: Country; bluegrass; pop; pop rock
- Length: 3:43 (album version) 3:35 (pop single mix) 4:26 (original version)
- Label: Republic Nashville
- Songwriter: Kimberly Perry
- Producers: Nathan Chapman; Paul Worley

The Band Perry singles chronology
"Hip to My Heart" (2009)	"If I Die Young" (2010)	"You Lie" (2011)

Alternate cover

Music video
- "If I Die Young" on YouTube

"If I Die Young" is a song written by Kimberly Perry and recorded by American country music trio The Band Perry, which Kimberly Perry is a part of. It was released on June 8, 2010, as the second single from the group's self-titled debut album.

== Content ==
"If I Die Young" is a mid-tempo tune accompanied by acoustic guitar, banjo, accordion, mandolin, fiddle, electric bass, and drums. It is in the key of E Major. The song is about the sadness of dying young ("The sharp knife of a short life") as the narrator describes how she never really got to experience love and worrying about how her loved ones will miss her and deal with the death. She recognizes that once someone dies, others seem to pay more attention to that person's life: "And maybe then you'll hear the words I been singin' / Funny when you're dead how people start listenin'." She states that if she dies young, then her family left behind should "save their tears" for a time when "they're really gonna need them." She states that she has had a well-lived life in the line "Well, I've had just enough time."

== Reception ==
The Band Perry received at least one letter in response to the song. In its envelope, the members also found a necklace with a ring on it. The letter's author was a young girl who had recently lost her best friend to cancer. Mourning her friend's death, the girl was contemplating suicide. Driving from work one day, she heard "If I Die Young" on the radio. Hearing "so much life in the song", the girl changed her mind. In her letter to The Band Perry, she wrote about the necklace: "I'm sending this to you, because it's the most important thing I own. This song literally saved my life."

=== Critical ===
Bobby Peacock of Roughstock spoke positively of the lyrics, saying that they were "very well-developed with interesting little details." He felt that, although the topic is "a little sugarcoated", the vocal performance is a "pleasant listening experience".

In 2024, Rolling Stone ranked the song at #162 on its 200 Greatest Country Songs of All Time ranking.

=== Commercial ===
"If I Die Young" debuted at number 57 on the U.S. Billboard Hot Country Songs chart for the week of May 29, 2010. It also debuted at number 92 on the Billboard Hot 100 chart for the week of July 24, 2010. In October 2010, it became the group's first top 10 single on the Hot Country Songs chart as well as their first top 20 on the Hot 100 chart. The song became their first number one hit on the Hot Country Songs chart for the week of December 11, 2010.

In early 2011, the song was remixed by Matt Ward and Dean Gillard for pop radio. The remix debuted at number 36 on the U.S. Billboard Pop Songs chart and number 29 on the U.S. Billboard Adult Contemporary chart for the week of June 11, 2011. With the remix impacting pop radio, the song re-entered the Hot 100 chart at number 46 for the week of June 25, 2011. It has since reached a new peak of number 14.

In May 2011, the song sold over 2 million copies, the eleventh country music song to do so, and only the fourth time that a band reached this plateau, following Lady A, Zac Brown Band and Rascal Flatts. At the time, "If I Die Young" song was the highest-selling single to miss the top ten, and as of August 24, 2015, "If I Die Young" surpassed 5 million downloads.

In July 2011, the song reached the top 15 of the Billboard Hot 100 chart in its thirty-fifth chart week, making it the slowest climb into the top 15. It broke the slowest climb record that was previously held by Carrie Underwood's "Before He Cheats", and Taylor Swift's "Teardrops on My Guitar". Both songs took thirty-three weeks to reach the top 15. The song spent 53 weeks on Billboard Hot 100 chart and is their best-selling single to date. It is also the only song with 53 or more weeks that ended its chart run in 2011.

== Music video ==
The music video, which was directed by David McClister, premiered on CMT on May 27, 2010. In the video, the band is shown setting Kimberly Perry in a canoe before pushing it off into the river. Perry is holding a book containing poems by Tennyson, including "The Lady of Shalott", which the book is opened to at the end of the music video. The video echoes a scene in Anne of Green Gables in which Anne attempts to appear as the Lady of the poem. Kimberly's mother and her love interest (played by Kyle Kupecky) are shown plucking flower petals and visibly depressed that she has left them. Eventually, her canoe begins to take on water, she sits up. Once this occurs her brothers come back for her. When she gets back to her house, her mother and love interest embrace her. The video was filmed on location at Two Rivers Mansion outside of Nashville, Tennessee. Throughout the video, the band is also shown performing with their instruments inside of the house.

== Charts ==
=== Weekly charts ===
Chart (2010–2012)	Peak position
Canada Hot 100 (Billboard)	48
Canada AC (Billboard)	14
Canada CHR/Top 40 (Billboard)	48
Canada Country (Billboard)	8
Canada Hot AC (Billboard)	26
Ireland (IRMA)	37
Scottish Singles Sales (Official Charts)	62
South Korea International Singles (Gaon)	16
UK Singles (Official Charts)	82
US Billboard Hot 100	14
US Adult Contemporary (Billboard)	1
US Adult Pop Airplay (Billboard)	4
US Hot Country Songs (Billboard)	1
US Pop Airplay (Billboard)	12

=== Year-end charts ===
Chart (2010)	Position
US Billboard Hot 100	92
US Country Songs (Billboard)	37

Chart (2011)	Position
US Billboard Hot 100	35
US Adult Contemporary (Billboard)	13
US Adult Pop Songs (Billboard)	22
US Country Songs (Billboard)	82
US Pop Songs (Billboard)	49

Chart (2012)	Position
US Adult Contemporary (Billboard)	20

== Certifications ==
Region	Certification	Certified units/sales
Brazil (Pro-Música Brasil)	Gold	30,000^{‡}
Canada (Music Canada)	Platinum	80,000^{*}
United Kingdom (BPI)	Silver	200,000^{‡}
United States (RIAA)	Diamond	10,000,000^{‡}
^{*} Sales figures based on certification alone.^{‡} Sales+streaming figures based on certification alone.

== Awards and nominations ==
Year	Association	Category	Result
2011	53rd Grammy Awards	Best Country Song — "If I Die Young"	Nominated
2011	Academy of Country Music Awards	Single Record of the Year — "If I Die Young"	Nominated
2011	Academy of Country Music Awards	Song of the Year — "If I Die Young"	Nominated
2011	2011 Billboard Music Awards	Top Country Song — "If I Die Young"	Nominated
2011	CMT Music Awards	Video of the Year — "If I Die Young"	Nominated
2011	CMT Music Awards	Group Video of the Year — "If I Die Young"	Nominated
2011	CMT Music Awards	USA Weekend Breakthrough Video of the Year — "If I Die Young"	Won
2011	Teen Choice Awards	Choice Music: Country Single — "If I Die Young"	Nominated
2011	Inspirational Country Music Awards	Inspirational Video — "If I Die Young"	Nominated
2011	Country Music Association Awards	Single of the Year — "If I Die Young"	Won
2011	Country Music Association Awards	Song of the Year — "If I Die Young"	Won
2011	Country Music Association Awards	Music Video of the Year — "If I Die Young"	Nominated

== Release history ==
Date	Country	Format
June 8, 2010	United States	Country radio
May 24, 2011	United States	Mainstream radio
February 24, 2012	United Kingdom	Digital download

== Glee version ==
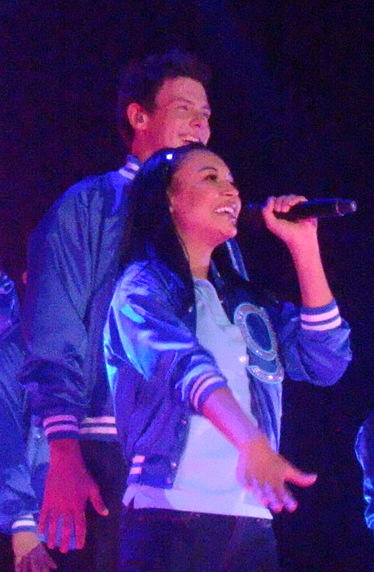
Naya Rivera and Cory Monteith performing during the Glee concert tour in 2011.

In 2013, Naya Rivera performed the song as her character Santana Lopez in tribute episode "The Quarterback", during the fifth season of the Fox jukebox musical comedy-drama series Glee, in honor of co-star and close friend Cory Monteith, who died on July 13, 2013. Monteith played Finn Hudson on the show, with his character also dying.

In a scene in the episode, Santana talks about Finn before beginning an acoustic cover of the song, but she breaks down in tears of sadness and grief over Finn before she can finish and runs away when friends try to console her. Speaking about the usage before the episode was broadcast, Kimberly Perry said: "I'm so excited that song is being used that way because even though it has 'die' in the title, it was really inspired by and about celebrating life [...] I obviously haven't seen the episode that's a tribute to Cory, but I feel like they're going to focus on his life rather than his death, so I'm really excited that 'If I Die Young' is going to be part of honoring him". Jeff Jensen for Entertainment Weekly confirmed that the episode focused on life, not death, and described Rivera's performance of the song as "the number of the night" and that it "was memorable for how she broke down halfway through it, then unleashed a furious howl".

The cover was released as a single as well as being a track on the album Glee: The Quarterback. The album debuted at number 7 on the Billboard 200, selling 47,000 copies and also charted as number one on the Billboard Soundtracks. The song was the last Glee single to chart during the show's run, doing so in the UK and Ireland.

Following Rivera's death, which was confirmed on July 13, 2020, the seven-year anniversary of Monteith's death, the song saw a surge of views on YouTube and became a trending topic on Twitter. Some Glee fans thought this was an insensitive reaction, however, and that other songs performed by Rivera would be better to promote.

Chart	Peak position
UK Singles Chart	82
Irish Singles Chart	56
Scottish Singles and Albums Charts	73

== Cady Groves cover ==
In February 2012, American pop-country singer Cady Groves uploaded a live cover of the song to SoundCloud. Prophetically, Groves would die in 2020 at the age of 30 from complications caused by alcohol abuse.

== If I Die Young Pt. 2 ==
Following the band's hiatus announcement, Kimberly recorded and released a follow-up titled "If I Die Young Pt. 2" as her solo debut single in May 2023.

== See also ==
- List of number-one country singles of 2010 (U.S.)
- List of Billboard Adult Contemporary number ones of 2011
