= All Your Life =

2011 single by The Band Perry

Single by The Band Perry

from the album The Band Perry
- Released: August 8, 2011
- Genre: Country
- Length: 3:52
- Label: Republic Nashville
- Songwriter: Brian Henningsen; Clara Henningsen
- Producer: Nathan Chapman

The Band Perry singles chronology
"You Lie" (2011)	"All Your Life" (2011)	"Postcard from Paris" (2012)

"All Your Life" is a song written by Brian and Clara Henningsen, and recorded by American country music group The Band Perry. It was released in August 2011 as the fourth single from the band's self-titled debut album.

== Content ==
In "All Your Life", the female narrator sings that she wants to be "the only girl you love all your life". The song is in cut time and the key of A major, with a main chord pattern of A-E-D2.

== Critical reception ==
Billy Dukes of Taste of Country gave the song two and a half stars out of five, saying that it "sounds like a song a dozen different artists could have cut." Bobby Peacock of Roughstock gave the song four and a half stars of five, writing that the song "sets itself a little left of center with interesting imagery" and is "easily one of the most euphonious songs [he's] come across in a long time."

== Music video ==
The music video was directed by David McClister and premiered in August 2011.

== Chart performance and certifications ==
"All Your Life" debuted at number 52 on the U.S. Billboard Hot Country Songs chart for the week of August 13, 2011. On February 18, 2012, it became the trio's second number one single. It debuted at number 95 on the Billboard Hot 100.

=== Weekly charts ===
Chart (2011–2012)	Peak position
Canada Hot 100 (Billboard)	62
US Billboard Hot 100	37
US Hot Country Songs (Billboard)	1

=== Year-end charts ===
Chart (2011)	Position
US Country Songs (Billboard)	74

Chart (2012)	Position
US Country Songs (Billboard)	25

=== Decade-end charts ===
Chart (2010–2019)	Position
US Hot Country Songs (Billboard)	47

=== Certifications ===
Region	Certification	Certified units/sales
United States (RIAA)	Platinum	1,000,000^{‡}
^{‡} Sales+streaming figures based on certification alone.
