= The Band Perry =

American country music group

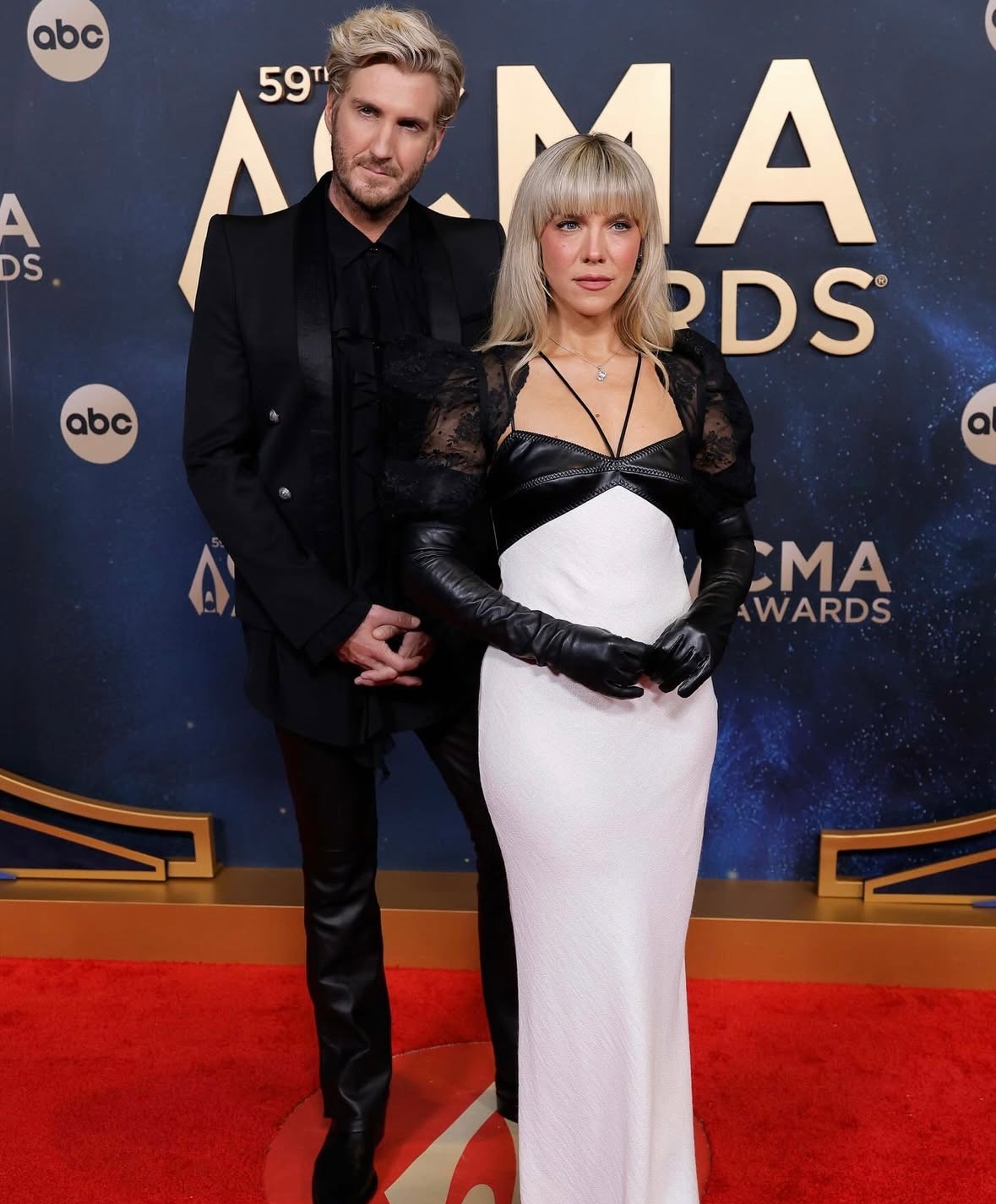
- The Band Perry at the Country Music Awards in 2025

Background information
- Origin: Greeneville, Tennessee, U.S.
- Genre: Country
- Years active: 2005–2023; 2025-present
- Labels: Republic Nashville (Nashville Harbor); Interscope; Mercury Nashville
- Members: Kimberly Perry; Johnny Costello
- Past members: Neil Perry; Reid Perry

The Band Perry is an American band formed in Greeneville, Tennessee in 2005. The band is composed of Kimberly Perry (lead vocals, guitar) and Johnny Costello (mandolin, background vocals). Kimberly's brothers Neil and Reid were members until 2025. Neil is currently working on solo music, and Reid has stepped into artist management.

They signed to Republic Nashville in August 2009 and released their self-titled debut album on October 12, 2010. From this album, "If I Die Young" reached number one on the U.S. Billboard Hot Country Songs and Hot Adult Contemporary Tracks charts and has been certified Diamond.

Their second album, Pioneer, was released April 2, 2013. It produced additional number one singles in "Better Dig Two" and "Done", plus the top 10 hits "Don't Let Me Be Lonely" and "Chainsaw".

The band transitioned to pop in 2017 and began to release music independently in 2018 before officially going on hiatus in 2023. Following this, Kimberly returned to her country roots and launched a solo career. In 2025, the Band returned featuring Kimberly Perry and her husband in place of her brothers.

== Career ==
=== 2005–09: Formation and early career ===
Kimberly Perry sang in her own band as a teenager with her brothers Neil and Reid working as roadies. At ages 8 and 10, the brothers began performing as an opening act, the Mobile Music Machines, for Kimberly. Kimberly released an EP entitled "Carry On" with a song of the same name inspiring two songs on "Pioneer". Once they had united to form as "the Band Perry", they joined a New Faces of Country tour in 2005.

In 2008, they were discovered by Garth Brooks' manager Bob Doyle, who helped them make recordings that were sent to Scott Borchetta, head of the newly established Republic Nashville label. They signed to Republic Nashville in August 2009 and released their debut single "Hip to My Heart". All three members wrote it with Brett Beavers. The song peaked at No. 20 on the Billboard Hot Country chart. A self-titled extended play followed in April.

=== 2010–14: The Band Perry and Pioneer ===
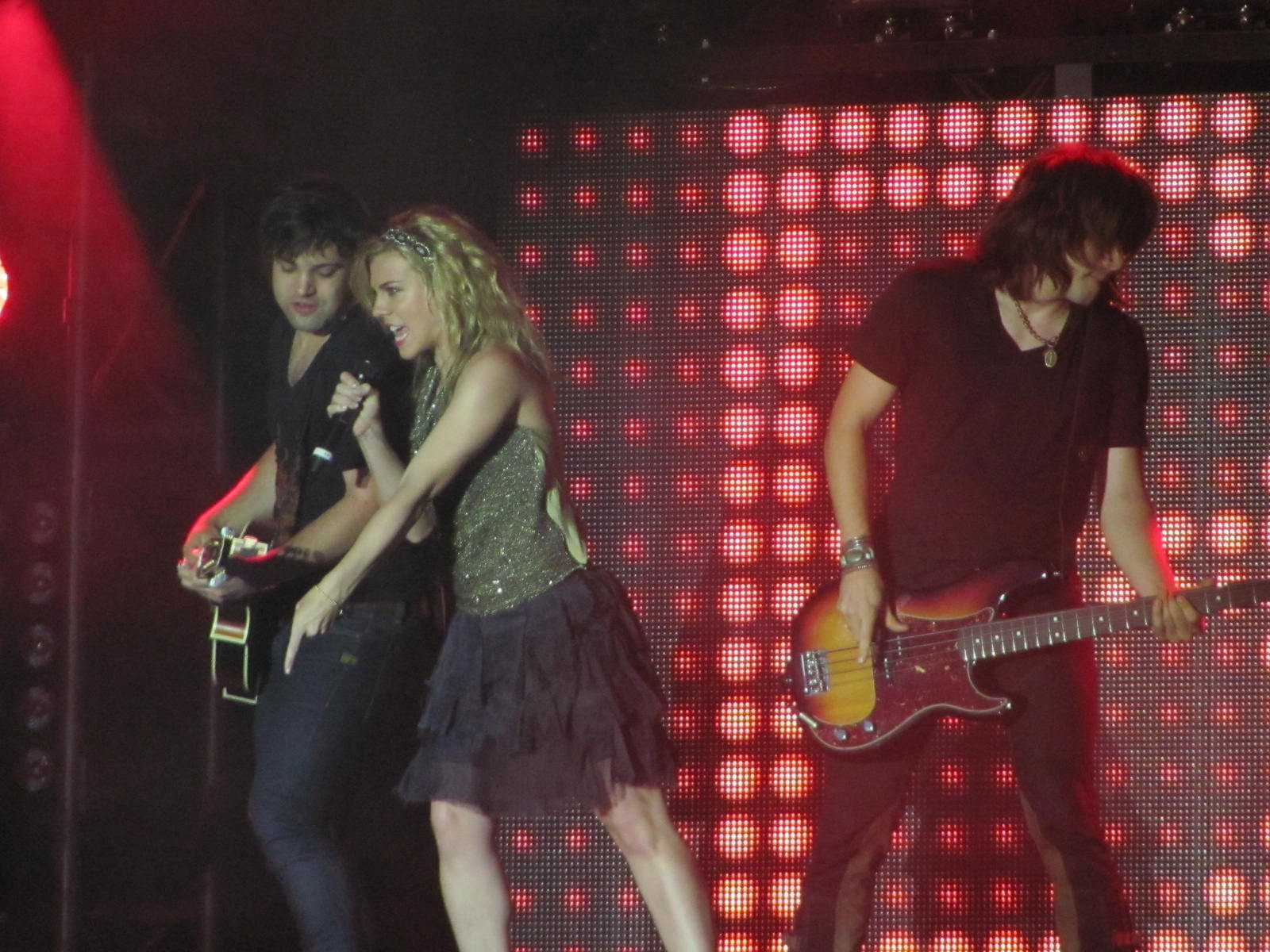
The Band Perry performing in 2013

After "Hip to My Heart" fell from the charts, the Band Perry released their second single, "If I Die Young", written by Kimberly. "If I Die Young" and "Hip to My Heart" are on the band's self-titled debut album, released on October 12, 2010. The album was produced by Paul Worley and Nathan Chapman. "If I Die Young" reached No. 1 on the country music chart, and No. 14 on the Billboard Hot 100. The album's third single, "You Lie", was written by Brian Henningsen, Aaron Henningsen, and Clara Henningsen. It debuted in December 2010 and hit No. 2 in 2011. After it, "All Your Life" reached number 1 in February 2012, and "Postcard from Paris" reached number 6. The album sold 1.6 million copies.

In mid-2012, the band began working with producer Rick Rubin on their second album, Pioneer, which was released on April 2, 2013. The album's first single, "Better Dig Two", was released to country radio on October 30, 2012. The album's second single, "Done", charted in March 2013 ahead of its release date, reaching number 8 on the Hot Country chart. It reached number 1 on the Country Airplay chart in August 2013. Pioneer ended up being produced by Dann Huff and became the group's first number one on the Top Country Albums chart in addition to reaching the number two spot on the all-genre Billboard 200. The album's third single, "Don't Let Me Be Lonely", was released to country radio on August 26, 2013. It reached number 2 on the Country Airplay chart in February 2014. The album's fourth single, "Chainsaw", which was originally recorded by the group Old Dominion, was released to country radio on March 3, 2014. The song peaked at number 10 on Country Airplay. Later that year, they recorded a cover of the Glen Campbell hit, "Gentle on My Mind", for the documentary about the singer titled Glen Campbell: I'll Be Me, which was released as a standalone single. The band performed in the pre-game show of Super Bowl XLVIII, on Sunday, February 2, 2014.

=== 2015–2017: Label change, My Bad Imagination and transition to pop ===
On August 14, 2015, the band released their new single called "Live Forever", the first single off their upcoming third studio album. One of the musicians they collaborated with on "Live Forever" is pop producer RedOne (Lady Gaga, Enrique Iglesias). The music video for it premiered on August 15, 2015, on CMT. On March 1, 2016, the Band Perry parted ways with their record label, Republic Nashville. Billboard announced on May 12, 2016, that the band had signed with Interscope Records. According to the magazine, the Band Perry is transitioning to pop music but will continue releasing select singles to the country format through sister label UMG Nashville.

Their third studio album, tentatively titled Heart + Beat, was to have included material recorded while the trio was signed to Republic Nashville (including "Live Forever") as well as new songs. The band later shot down rumors that they were "going pop". The Band Perry stated that the main reason they signed with Interscope was so that their music could be distributed to other formats of radio, besides country. In July 2016, Neil, Reid, and Kimberly appeared on Celebrity Family Feud, where Kimberly scored 196 points in the Fast Money round, which host Steve Harvey said might be the record. The Band Perry released their next single, "Comeback Kid", to country radio on August 1, 2016, through Mercury Nashville.

On February 2, 2017, the band announced the title of their third album, My Bad Imagination. Unlike their previous two albums, this one would be pop. They said, "Creating it has been the most exciting thing we've ever done." Another pop single, "Stay in the Dark", followed in 2017. The album was subsequently confirmed a year later to have been scrapped.

=== 2018–present: Label change, Coordinates, hiatus ===
In mid-2018, the band left Interscope Records/Mercury Nashville to release music independently. On September 21, the band released a five-song collection called Coordinates via ARTRAT, their newly formed creative house. The band wrote and produced all 5 songs themselves while Rick Rubin oversaw the project as executive producer.

On March 27, 2023, the band announced that they are going on a hiatus to focus on solo work. Kimberly announced her debut solo EP Bloom alongside the release of "If I Die Young Pt. 2". The EP was released on June 9, 2023.

Kimberly made her solo debut on the Grand Ole Opry on May 6, 2023.

In 2025, the Band Perry reunited and re-signed with BMLG, which has since been named Nashville Harbor. At this time, Kimberly's husband Johnny Costello replaced Neil Perry as backing vocalist. On October 13, 2025, Reid Perry announced his departure from the band, expressing a desire to focus on a career in artist management. In August of 2026 Neil stated that he was terminated from the band against his will so that it could become a marital duo. He also revealed that the siblings no longer speak.

== Personal lives ==
Kimberly Marie Perry was born on July 12, 1983. On September 30, 2013, Kimberly became engaged to J. P. Arencibia, at that time a catcher with the Toronto Blue Jays of Major League Baseball. They were married on June 12, 2014, in Greeneville, Tennessee. In March 2018, she filed for divorce from Arencibia. Kimberly married Johnny Costello in June 2021. On April 13, 2023, the couple announced they are expecting their first child in August.

Reid Hogan Perry was born on November 17, 1988. Neil Clark Perry was born on July 23, 1990. Kimberly and her brothers are the niece and nephews of baseball author and journalist Dayn Perry.

All three Perry siblings were born and raised in Greeneville, Tennessee, where Kimberly still lives with her husband and children.

== Philanthropy ==
The Band Perry started their November tour in September by putting on a concert to benefit Heifer International and their fight to end global hunger.

They received positive publicity in 2014 after offering to cover the burial expenses for the funerals of nine people (a mother and eight of her children) killed in an accidental house fire in the Greenville, Kentucky, an area in Muhlenberg County, Kentucky. The band also paid the costs of family members' hotel expenses while the father and the surviving daughter were being treated for burns at Vanderbilt University Medical Center in Nashville, Tennessee. Previously, they also volunteered their time to support Alzheimer's research.

== Discography ==
- The Band Perry (2010)
- Pioneer (2013)

== Tours ==
Headlining

- We Are Pioneers World Tour with Lindsay Ell & Easton Corbin (2013–14).
- Coordinates Tour (2018)
- The Good Life Tour (2019)

Supporting

- All the Women I Am Tour (2011) with Reba McEntire
- Virtual Reality Tour (2012) with Brad Paisley
- Live & Loud Tour (2013) with Rascal Flatts
- Ten Times Crazier Tour (2014) with Blake Shelton

== Awards and nominations ==
Year	Association	Category	Result
2010	Country Music Association Awards	Vocal Group of the Year	Nominated
2010	American Country Awards	New/Breakthrough Artist of the Year	Nominated
2010	American Country Awards	Duo/Group of the Year	Nominated
2011	53rd Grammy Awards	Best Country Song — "If I Die Young"	Nominated
2011	Academy of Country Music Awards	Top New Vocal Duo or Group	Won
2011	Academy of Country Music Awards	Top New Artist	Won
2011	Academy of Country Music Awards	Top Vocal Group	Nominated
2011	Academy of Country Music Awards	Single Record of the Year — "If I Die Young"	Nominated
2011	Academy of Country Music Awards	Song of the Year — "If I Die Young"	Nominated
2011	2011 Billboard Music Awards	Top Country Song — "If I Die Young"	Nominated
2011	CMT Music Awards	Video of the Year — "If I Die Young"	Nominated
2011	CMT Music Awards	Group Video of the Year — "If I Die Young"	Nominated
2011	CMT Music Awards	USA Weekend Breakthrough Video of the Year — "If I Die Young"	Won
2011	CMT Music Awards	Nationwide Insurance On Your Side Award	Won
2011	2011 Teen Choice Awards	Choice Music: Country Single — "If I Die Young"	Nominated
2011	2011 Teen Choice Awards	Choice Music: Country Group	Nominated
2011	Inspirational Country Music Awards	Inspirational Video — "If I Die Young"	Nominated
2011	Country Music Association Awards	New Artist of the Year	Won
2011	Country Music Association Awards	Vocal Group of the Year	Nominated
2011	Country Music Association Awards	Single of the Year — "If I Die Young"	Won
2011	Country Music Association Awards	Song of the Year — "If I Die Young"	Won
2011	Country Music Association Awards	Music Video of the Year — "If I Die Young"	Nominated
2011	American Music Awards	Sprint New Artist of the Year	Nominated
2011	American Music Awards	Country Music: Favorite Band, Duo or Group	Nominated
2011	American Music Awards	Country Music: Favorite Album — The Band Perry	Nominated
2011	American Country Awards	Artist of the Year: Duo or Group	Nominated
2011	American Country Awards	Artist of the Year: New Artist	Nominated
2011	American Country Awards	Single of the Year: Duo or Group — "You Lie"	Nominated
2011	American Country Awards	Single of the Year: New Artist — "You Lie"	Nominated
2011	American Country Awards	Music Video: Duo, Group or Collaboration — "You Lie"	Nominated
2011	American Country Awards	Music Video: New Artist — "You Lie"	Nominated
2012	54th Grammy Awards	Best New Artist	Nominated
2012	Academy of Country Music Awards	Vocal Group of the Year	Nominated
2012	2012 Billboard Music Awards	Top Country Album: The Band Perry	Nominated
2012	CMT Music Awards	Group Video of The Year – "All Your Life"	Nominated
2012	2012 Teen Choice Awards	Country Group	Nominated
2012	Country Music Association Awards	Vocal Group of the Year	Nominated
2012	American Country Awards	Artist of the Year: Group	Nominated
2012	American Country Awards	Single of the Year: Group- "All Your Life"	Nominated
2012	American Country Awards	Music Video of the Year: Group- "All Your Life"	Nominated
2013	British Country Music Association Awards	International Act of the Year	Nominated
2013	Academy of Country Music Awards	Top Vocal Group	Won
2013	CMT Music Awards	Group Video of the Year - "Better Dig Two"	Nominated
2013	Teen Choice Awards	Choice Music: Break-Up Song- "DONE."	Nominated
2013	Teen Choice Awards	Choice Music: Country Group	Nominated
2014	ACM Awards	Vocal Group of the Year	Won
2014	CMT Awards	Group Video of the Year - "DONE."	Won
2014	CMT Awards	CMT Performance Video of the Year - "My Songs Know What You Did in the Dark (Light 'Em Up)" w/(Fall Out Boy)	Nominated
2014	Teen Choice Awards	Choice Music: Country Group	Nominated
2014	CMA Awards	Vocal Group of the Year	Nominated
2015	People's Choice Awards	Favorite Country Group	Nominated
2015	57th Grammy Awards	Best Country Duo/Group Performance – "Gentle on My Mind"	Won
2015	ACM Awards	Vocal Group of the Year	Nominated
2015	CMA Awards	Vocal Group of the Year	Nominated
2016	People's Choice Awards	Favorite Country Group	Nominated
2017	People's Choice Awards	Favorite Country Group	Nominated
