= Zac Brown Band discography =

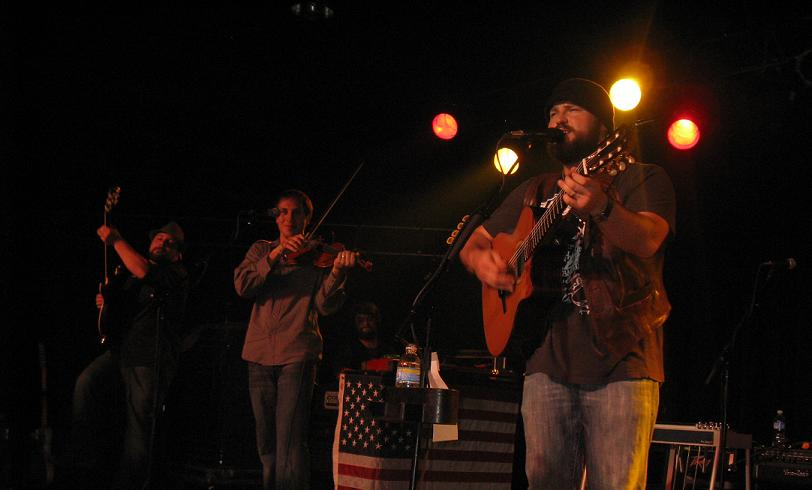
- Studio albums: 8
- Extended plays: 3
- Live albums: 3
- Compilation albums: 1
- Singles: 36
- Music videos: 19
- US / Canada No. 1 singles: 15 / 7

American country music band Zac Brown Band has released eight studio albums, three extended plays, three live albums, and thirty-six singles. Fourteen of those singles reached number one on either the US Billboard Hot Country Songs or Country Airplay chart, while one reached number one on the Billboard Mainstream Rock chart.

Their first release was Home Grown, an independently-released demo album, in December 2005. It featured early versions of "Chicken Fried", "Whatever It Is", and "Junkyard", along with eight other songs never re-recorded or re-released by the band. In 2008, they released their debut single, "Chicken Fried". It became their first number-one single on the country singles charts and also became a top 20 hit on the Billboard Hot 100. Their major label debut album, The Foundation was released November 18, 2008. It featured four additional singles, including the number ones "Toes", "Highway 20 Ride", and "Free". In 2010, a duet with Alan Jackson was released as the lead-off single to their second album, You Get What You Give. The album's first four singles, "As She's Walking Away", "Colder Weather", "Knee Deep", and "Keep Me in Mind" all became number-one hits.

Their third album, Uncaged, was released on July 10, 2012. It features the singles "The Wind", "Goodbye in Her Eyes", "Jump Right In", and "Sweet Annie". The band's second extended play, The Grohl Sessions, Vol. 1, was released on December 10, 2013, and features the single "All Alright", which was released on April 28, 2014. The band's fourth studio album, Jekyll + Hyde, was released on April 28, 2015. It features the singles "Homegrown", "Heavy Is the Head", Loving You Easy", "Junkyard", "Beautiful Drug", and "Castaway". "Heavy Is the Head" and "Junkyard" were both released as rock singles, with "Heavy Is the Head" becoming the band's first number-one single on the Billboard Mainstream Rock chart. Their fifth album, Welcome Home, was released on May 12, 2017, and featured the singles "My Old Man" and "Roots".

Their sixth album, The Owl, was released on September 20, 2019. The album produced two singles: "Someone I Used to Know" and "Leaving Love Behind". On October 15, 2021, the band released The Comeback, their seventh studio album. The Comeback was the band's first album since The Foundation to not reach number one on the Billboard Top Country Albums chart. The album has produced the singles "Same Boat" and "Out in the Middle". "Same Boat" was the band's first single to reach number one on the Billboard Country Airplay chart since "Beautiful Drug" in 2016. Their third extended play, No Wake Zone, was released on September 20, 2024 on all digital platforms. It most notably featured the song "Pirates & Parrots", a tribute to fellow country artist Jimmy Buffett, who died on September 1, 2023. Love & Fear, their eighth studio album, was released on December 5, 2025. Four singles were released off it: "I Ain't Worried About it", "Let It Run" (a duet with Snoop Dogg), and the double single "Butterfly" (ft. Dolly Parton) with "Give It Away".

== Studio albums ==
=== 2000s albums ===
Title	Album details	Peak chart positions		Certifications (sales threshold)
Title	Album details	US	US Country	Certifications (sales threshold)
Home Grown	Release date: December 16, 2005; Label: self-released; Formats: CD, music download	—	—	
The Foundation	Release date: November 18, 2008; Label: Atlantic/Home Grown/Bigger Picture; Formats: CD, music download	9	2	RIAA: 5× Platinum; MC: Platinum; RMNZ: Platinum
"—" denotes releases that did not chart.

=== 2010s and 2020s albums ===
Title	Album details	Peak chart positions					Certifications (sales threshold)
Title	Album details	US	US Country	AUS	CAN	UK Country	Certifications (sales threshold)
You Get What You Give	Release date: September 21, 2010; Label: Atlantic/Southern Ground/Bigger Picture; Formats: CD, music download	1	1	—	12	—	RIAA: 3× Platinum; MC: Gold
Uncaged	Release date: July 10, 2012; Label: Atlantic/Southern Ground/RPM; Formats: CD, music download	1	1	38	1	4	RIAA: Platinum; MC: Gold
Jekyll + Hyde	Release date: April 28, 2015; Label: John Varvatos Records/Big Machine Label Group/Republic Records; Formats: CD, music download	1	1	6	1	2	RIAA: Platinum; MC: Gold
Welcome Home	Release date: May 12, 2017; Label: Elektra Records; Formats: CD, music download	2	1	8	2	—	MC: Gold
The Owl	Release date: September 20, 2019; Label: Wheelhouse, BMG; Formats: CD, music download	2	1	29	39	—	
The Comeback	Release date: October 15, 2021; Label: Home Grown/Warner Music Nashville; Formats: CD, music download	27	3	42	64	—	
Love & Fear	Release date: December 5, 2025; Label: Master of None; Formats: vinyl, music download	— (Note: Love & Fear did not enter the Billboard 200, but peaked at number 28 on the Top Current Album Sales component chart.)	—	—	—	—	
"—" denotes releases that did not chart.

== Live albums ==
Title	Album details	Peak chart positions		Certifications (sales threshold)
Title	Album details	US	US Country	Certifications (sales threshold)
Live from the Rock Bus Tour	Release date: January 3, 2007; Label: Home Grown; Formats: CD, music download	—	—	
Pass the Jar	Release date: May 4, 2010; Label: Atlantic/Home Grown/Bigger Picture; Formats: CD, music download	17	2	RIAA: Gold
From the Road, Vol. 1: Covers	Release date: November 10, 2023; Label: Home Grown; Formats: vinyl, music download	—	—	
"—" denotes releases that did not chart

== Compilation albums ==
Title	Album details	Peak chart positions		
Title	Album details	US	US Country	AUS
Greatest Hits So Far...	Release date: November 10, 2014; Label: Atlantic/Southern Ground; Formats: CD, music download	20	3	67

== Extended plays ==
Title	Album details	Peak chart positions		
Title	Album details	US	US Country	US Indie
Live from Bonnaroo	Release date: August 4, 2009; Label: Atlantic/Home Grown/Bigger Picture; Formats: CD, music download	95	20	—
The Grohl Sessions, Vol. 1	Release date: December 10, 2013; Label: Southern Ground; Formats: CD, music download	25	5	3
No Wake Zone	Release date: September 20, 2024; Label: Home Grown; Formats: music download	—	—	—
"—" denotes releases that did not chart

== Singles ==
=== 2000s singles ===
Year	Title	Peak chart positions					Certifications	Album
Year	Title	US	US Country	US Country Airplay	CAN Country	CAN	Certifications	Album
2008	"Chicken Fried"	20	1		10	52	RIAA: 9× Platinum; BPI: Gold; MC: Gold; RMNZ: 4× Platinum	The Foundation
2009	"Whatever It Is"	26	2		7	72	RIAA: 2× Platinum	The Foundation
2009	"Toes"	25	1		3	60	RIAA: 3× Platinum; MC: Gold; RMNZ: Platinum	The Foundation
2009	"Highway 20 Ride"	40	1		3	66	RIAA: Platinum	The Foundation

=== 2010s singles ===
Year	Title	Peak chart positions							Certifications	Album
Year	Title	US	US Country	US Country Airplay	US Main	CAN	CAN Country	CAN Rock	Certifications	Album
2010	"Free"	34	1		—	59	7	—	RIAA: Platinum	The Foundation
2010	"As She's Walking Away" (featuring Alan Jackson)	32	1		—	49	1	—	RIAA: Platinum	You Get What You Give
2011	"Colder Weather"	29	1		—	47	1	—	RIAA: 2× Platinum; MC: Gold; RMNZ: Gold	You Get What You Give
2011	"Knee Deep" (featuring Jimmy Buffett)	18	1		—	42	1	—	RIAA: 3× Platinum; MC: Gold; RMNZ: Platinum	You Get What You Give
2011	"Keep Me in Mind"	35	1		—	64	1	—	RIAA: Platinum	You Get What You Give
2012	"No Hurry"	50	2		—	72	6	—		You Get What You Give
2012	"The Wind"	70	11		—	68	4	—		Uncaged
2012	"Goodbye in Her Eyes"	48	5	1	—	54	1	—	RIAA: Platinum	Uncaged
2013	"Jump Right In"	53	13	2	—	63	3	—		Uncaged
2013	"Sweet Annie"	47	6	1	—	47	2	—	RIAA: Gold	Uncaged
2014	"All Alright"	— (Note: "All Alright" did not enter the Hot 100, but peaked at number 5 on the Bubbling Under Hot 100 chart.)	24	17	—	—	40	—		The Grohl Sessions, Vol. 1
2015	"Homegrown"	35	2	1	—	43	1	—	RIAA: 2× Platinum; RMNZ: Gold	Jekyll + Hyde
2015	"Heavy Is the Head" (featuring Chris Cornell)	—	—	—	1	—	—	1		Jekyll + Hyde
2015	"Loving You Easy"	40	4	1	—	55	2	—	RIAA: Platinum	Jekyll + Hyde
2015	"Junkyard"	—	—	—	32	—	—	49		Jekyll + Hyde
2015	"Beautiful Drug"	52	5	1	—	68	2	—	RIAA: Platinum	Jekyll + Hyde
2016	"Castaway"	96	17	14	—	—	6	—		Jekyll + Hyde
2017	"My Old Man"	68	10	14	—	—	22	—	RIAA: Gold; MC: Gold	Welcome Home
2017	"Roots"	—	39	36	—	—	31	—		Welcome Home
2018	"Someone I Used to Know"	—	23	29	—	—	—	—	MC: Gold	The Owl
"—" denotes releases that did not chart

=== 2020s singles ===
Year	Title	Peak chart positions				Certifications	Album
Year	Title	US	US Country	US Country Airplay	CAN Country	Certifications	Album
2020	"Leaving Love Behind"	—	—	55	—		The Owl
2020	"The Man Who Loves You the Most"	96	24	46	—		non-album singles
2020	"You and Islands"	—	46	—	—		non-album singles
2021	"Same Boat"	48	8	1	3	RIAA: Gold; MC: Gold	The Comeback
2022	"Out in the Middle"	86	22	12	31	RIAA: Gold	The Comeback
2024	"Tie Up"	—	43	24	49		No Wake Zone
2024	"Pirates and Parrots" (featuring Mac McAnally)	—	—	—	—		No Wake Zone
2024	"Two Blue Chairs & You"	—	—	—	—		No Wake Zone
2025	"I Ain't Worried About It"	—	—	—	—		Love & Fear
2025	"Let It Run" (featuring Snoop Dogg)	—	—	—	—		Love & Fear
2025	"Butterfly" (featuring Dolly Parton)	—	—	—	—		Love & Fear
2025	"Give It Away"	—	—	—	—		Love & Fear
"—" denotes releases that did not chart

=== Featured singles ===
Year	Title	Artist	Album
2010	"This Song's for You"	Joey + Rory	Album Number Two
2023	"Can't Stop Us Now"	Pitbull	Trackhouse

== Other charted songs ==
Year	Title	Peak chart positions		Album
Year	Title	US Bubbling	US Country	Album
2010	"Can't You See" (with Kid Rock)	11	—	Pass the Jar
2010	"Different Kind of Fine"	—	55	The Foundation
2012	"Day That I Die" (with Amos Lee)	4	—	Uncaged
2012	"Island Song"	24	—	Uncaged
2015	"Tomorrow Never Comes"	—	37	Jekyll + Hyde
2015	"I'll Be Your Man (Song for a Daughter)"	—	50	Jekyll + Hyde
2017	"Real Thing"	—	34	Welcome Home
2017	"All the Best"	—	43	Welcome Home
"—" denotes releases that did not chart

== Videography ==
=== Music videos ===
Year	Title	Director
2008	"Chicken Fried"	Clifton Collins, Jr.
2009	"Whatever It Is"	Clifton Collins, Jr.
2009	"Toes"	Darren Doane
2010	"Highway 20 Ride"	Darren Doane
2010	"Free"	Darren Doane
2010	"As She's Walking Away" (with Alan Jackson)	Darren Doane
2011	"Colder Weather"	Darren Doane
2011	"Knee Deep" (with Jimmy Buffett)	Darren Doane
2011	"Keep Me in Mind"	Fenton Williams
2012	"No Hurry"	Cole Cassell
2012	"The Wind"	Mike Judge
2012	"Goodbye in Her Eyes"	Wayne Isham
2013	"Jump Right In"	Cole Cassell
2013	"Sweet Annie"	Cole Cassell
2014	"All Alright"	Cole Cassell
2015	"Loving You Easy"	Danny Clinch
2016	"I’ll Be Your Man (Song For A Daughter)"	Diego Pernía
2017	"My Old Man"	Markus Blunder
2017	"Roots"	Diego Pernia
2018	"Someone I Used To Know"	Phillip R Lopez
2021	"Same Boat"	Spidey Smith
2024	"Tie Up"	
2024	"Two Blue Chairs & You"	

=== Guest appearances ===
Year	Title	Director
2010	"This Song's for You" (with Joey + Rory)	Darren Doane
2010	"We Are the World 25 for Haiti" (Zac Brown only) (Artists for Haiti)	Paul Haggis
2011	"My Name Is Money" (Zac Brown, John Driskell Hopkins, and Coy Bowles only) (with Sonia Leigh)	Chris Hicky
2014	"Midnight Rider" (Zac Brown with Gregg Allman and Vince Gill)	Conor McAnally
2015	"Broken Arrows" (Zac Brown only) (with Avicii)	Julius Onah

== Album appearances ==
Year	Title	Artist	Album
2010	"This Song's for You"	Joey + Rory	Album Number Two
2011	"Forever and Ever, Amen"	Randy Travis	25th Anniversary Celebration
2013	"Bad Moon Rising"	John Fogerty	Wrote a Song for Everyone
2014	"Harmony"	Elton John	Goodbye Yellow Brick Road: Revisited & Beyond
2014	"Black Water"	The Doobie Brothers	Southbound
2015	"Holiday Road"	—N/a	Vacation: Original Motion Picture Soundtrack
2016	"Grandma's Garden"	—N/a	Southern Family
2017	"Leader of the Band"	—N/a	A Tribute to Dan Fogelberg
2017	"Cover Me Up"	Jason Isbell	Spotify Singles
2018	"From Now On"	—N/a	The Greatest Showman: Reimagined
2020	"I'd Take Another One of Those"	Shenandoah	Every Road
2023	"Can't Stop Us Now"	Pitbull	Trackhouse

== See also ==
- Sir Rosevelt#Discography
- Zac Brown#Discography
