= Greatest Hits So Far... (Zac Brown Band album) =

Greatest hits album by Zac Brown Band
- Released: November 10, 2014
- Genre: Country
- Length: 54:26
- Label: Atlantic; Southern Ground
- Producer: Zac Brown; Keith Stegall

Zac Brown Band chronology
The Grohl Sessions, Vol. 1 (2013)	Greatest Hits So Far... (2014)	Jekyll + Hyde (2015)

Professional ratings
Review scores
Source	Rating
Allmusic	4.5/5 stars

Greatest Hits So Far... is a compilation album by American country music group Zac Brown Band. It was released on November 10, 2014, via Atlantic Records and Southern Ground. The album includes the band's first fourteen singles from "Chicken Fried" in 2008 to "Sweet Annie" in 2013.

== Commercial performance ==
The album debuted on Billboard 200 at No. 20 and on the Top Country Albums chart at No. 5, with 20,000 sold for the week. The album has sold 347,000 copies in pure album sales the US as of April 2017, and 3,335,000 units including tracks and streams as of March 2020.

== Track listing ==
No.	Title	Writer(s)	Length
1.	"Chicken Fried"	Zac Brown, Wyatt Durrette	3:59
2.	"Whatever It Is"	Brown, Durrette	3:29
3.	"Toes"	Brown, Durrette, John Driskell Hopkins, Shawn Mullins	4:21
4.	"Free"	Brown	3:48
5.	"Highway 20 Ride"	Brown, Durrette	3:49
6.	"As She's Walking Away" (featuring Alan Jackson)	Brown, Durrette	3:44
7.	"Colder Weather"	Brown, Durrette, Levi Lowrey, Coy Bowles	4:35
8.	"Knee Deep" (featuring Jimmy Buffett)	Brown, Durrette, Bowles, Jeffrey Steele	3:23
9.	"Keep Me in Mind"	Brown, Durrette, Nic Cowan	3:34
10.	"No Hurry"	Brown, Durrette, James Otto	3:46
11.	"The Wind"	Brown, Durrette, Lowrey	2:57
12.	"Jump Right In"	Brown, Durrette, Jason Mraz	3:01
13.	"Goodbye in Her Eyes"	Brown, Durrette, Hopkins, Sonia Leigh	5:25
14.	"Sweet Annie"	Brown, Durrette, Leigh, John Pierce	4:38

== Charts ==
=== Weekly charts ===
Weekly chart performance for Greatest Hits So Far...
Chart (2014–2015)	Peak position
Australian Albums (ARIA)	97
US Billboard 200	20
US Top Country Albums (Billboard)	3
Chart (2017)	Peak position
Australian Albums (ARIA)	67

=== Year-end charts ===
Year-end chart performance for Greatest Hits So Far...
Chart (2015)	Position
US Billboard 200	63
US Top Country Albums (Billboard)	17
Chart (2016)	Position
US Billboard 200	123
US Top Country Albums (Billboard)	45
Chart (2017)	Position
US Billboard 200	127
US Top Country Albums (Billboard)	20
Chart (2018)	Position
US Billboard 200	135
US Top Country Albums (Billboard)	16
Chart (2019)	Position
US Billboard 200	134
US Top Country Albums (Billboard)	13
Chart (2020)	Position
US Billboard 200	139
US Top Country Albums (Billboard)	13
Chart (2021)	Position
US Billboard 200	122
US Top Country Albums (Billboard)	11
Chart (2022)	Position
US Billboard 200	195
US Top Country Albums (Billboard)	22
Chart (2023)	Position
US Billboard 200	166
US Top Country Albums (Billboard)	25
Chart (2024)	Position
Australian Country Albums (ARIA)	35
US Top Country Albums (Billboard)	48
