= Pass the Jar: Zac Brown Band and Friends Live from the Fabulous Fox Theatre in Atlanta =

Pass The Jar - Zac Brown Band and Friends Live (From the Fabulous Fox Theatre In Atlanta)

Live album by Zac Brown Band
- Released: May 4, 2010
- Genre: Country
- Length: 120:41 (CD's); 115:51 (DVD)
- Label: Southern Ground/Roar/Atlantic Nashville
- Producer: Josh Karchmer, Alfred Tomaszewski

Zac Brown Band chronology
Live from Bonnaroo (2009)	Pass The Jar - Zac Brown Band and Friends Live (From the Fabulous Fox Theatre In Atlanta) (2010)	You Get What You Give (2010)

Professional ratings
Review scores
Source	Rating
Allmusic	3.5/5 stars

Pass the Jar - Zac Brown Band and Friends Live (From the Fabulous Fox Theatre In Atlanta) is the second live album by American country music band, Zac Brown Band. It was released on May 4, 2010. As of September 2015, the album has sold 526,000 copies in the US.

== Content ==
Pass The Jar contains 2 CDs and 1 DVD of Zac Brown Band's live performance at the Fox Theatre in Atlanta, GA on October 30, 2009. Guest artists on the album include: Kid Rock, Little Big Town, Shawn Mullins, Joey + Rory, Angie Aparo, Sonia Leigh.

== Critical reception ==
Steve Leggett with Allmusic gave the release a three-and-a-half out of five star rating, saying that it "captures the reverent, communal feel of the band’s performances [...] It all flows naturally and easily, making this set a wonderful introduction to a very special band."

== Track listing ==
CD 1
No.	Title	Writer(s)	Length
1.	"Whatever It Is"	Zac Brown, Wyatt Durrette	4:04
2.	"Let It Go"	Brown, Durrette	4:37
3.	"It's Not Ok"	John Driskell Hopkins	4:09
4.	"Jolene"	Ray LaMontagne	5:26
5.	"Who Knows"	Brown, Joel Williams	10:28
6.	"The Night They Drove Old Dixie Down"	Robbie Robertson	4:28
7.	"Sic 'Em On a Chicken"	Brown, Hopkins	4:05
8.	"Where the Boat Leaves From/One Love"	Brown, Durrette, Bob Marley	3:51
9.	"Trying To Drive"	Brown, Aslyn Mitchell	4:32
10.	"Alabama Jubilee"	George Cobb, Jack Yellen	2:57
11.	"Blackbird"	John Lennon, Paul McCartney	7:14
12.	"The Devil Went Down to Georgia"	Tommy Crain, Charlie Daniels, Taz Di Gregorio, Fred Edwards, Charlie Hayward, Jim Marshall	4:31

CD 2
No.	Title	Writer(s)	Length
1.	"Can't You See"	Toy Caldwell	5:46
2.	"Highway 20 Ride"	Brown, Durrette	4:15
3.	"Whiskey's Gone"	Brown, Durrette	2:47
4.	"Colder Weather"	Brown, Durrette	4:29
5.	"Junkyard"	Brown	6:07
6.	"Free/Into the Mystic"	Brown, Van Morrison	7:36
7.	"America the Beautiful"	Katherine Lee Bates, Samuel A. Ward	1:41
8.	"Chicken Fried"	Brown, Durrette	5:10
9.	"I Shall Be Released"	Bob Dylan	6:04
10.	"Bar"	Brown, Sonia Leigh	3:59
11.	"Toes"	Brown, Durette, John Driskell Hopkins, Shawn Mullins	4:33
12.	"We're Gonna Make This Day"	Brown, Nic Cowan, Durrette, Cee Lo Green	7:52

DVD
No.	Title	Length
1.	"Intro"
2.	"Whatever It is"
3.	"It's Not Ok"
4.	"Jolene"
5.	"Who Knows"
6.	"The Night They Drove Old Dixie Down"
7.	"Sic 'Em On a Chicken"
8.	"Junkyard"
9.	"The Devil Went Down To Georgia"
10.	"Trying To Drive"
11.	"Alabama Jubilee"
12.	"Can't You See"
13.	"Highway 20 Ride"
14.	"Colder Weather"
15.	"Free/Into the Mystic"
16.	"Toes"
17.	"America the Beautiful"
18.	"Chicken Fried"
19.	"We're Gonna Make This Day"

DVD Bonus Tracks
No.	Title	Length
20.	"Cheater, Cheater"
21.	"All American"
22.	"My Name is Money"
23.	"Money Don't Make You Happy"
24.	"Say What?"

== Charts ==
=== Weekly charts ===
Chart (2010)	Peak position
US Billboard 200	17
US Top Country Albums (Billboard)	2

=== Year-end charts ===
Chart (2010)	Position
US Top Country Albums (Billboard)	43
Chart (2011)	Position
US Top Country Albums (Billboard)	46

== Certifications ==
Region	Certification	Certified units/sales
United States (RIAA)	Gold	500,000^{^}
^{^} Shipments figures based on certification alone.
