= List of Hot Country Songs number ones of 2010 =

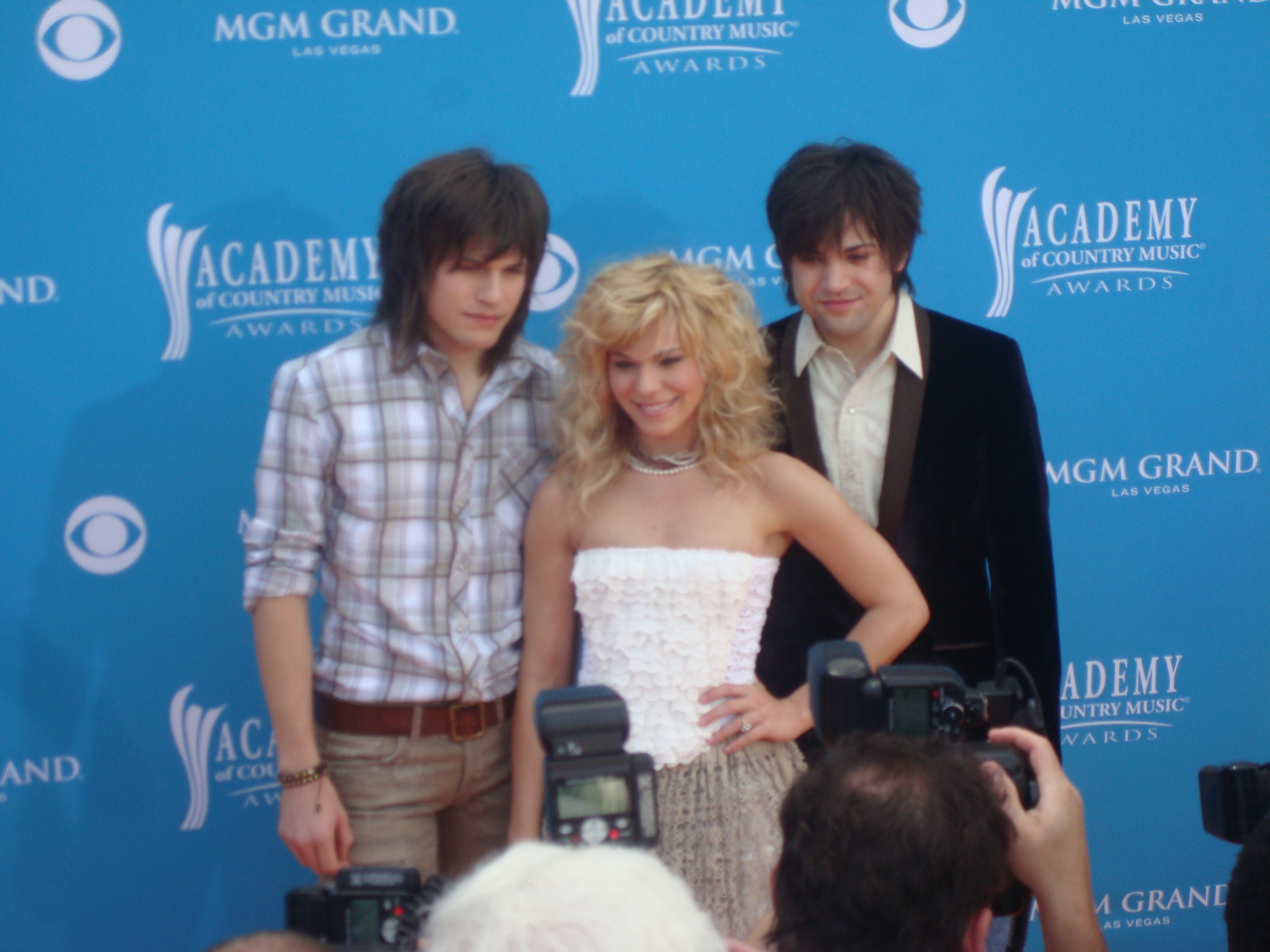
The Band Perry achieved its first number-one hit in 2010.

Hot Country Songs is a chart that ranks the top-performing country music songs in the United States, published by Billboard magazine. In 2010, 29 different songs topped the chart in 52 issues of the magazine, based on weekly airplay data from country music radio stations compiled by Nielsen Broadcast Data Systems.

In the first issue of the new year, Reba McEntire reached number one with "Consider Me Gone", replacing "Need You Now" by Lady Antebellum, which had been number one since the issue dated November 28, 2009. With this release, for which the singer was credited only as Reba, McEntire gained the longest-running chart-topper of her career, and achieved the feat of having topped the chart in four different decades, having first reached number one in 1983 with "Can't Even Get the Blues". "Consider Me Gone" was one of three songs to tie for the longest run at the top of the chart in 2010, along with "Why Don't We Just Dance" by Josh Turner and "The House That Built Me" by Miranda Lambert; all three spent four weeks in the top spot.

Seven acts achieved more than one number-one hit during the year. Easton Corbin, Billy Currington, Lady Antebellum, Brad Paisley, Blake Shelton and Josh Turner each reached the top with two different songs. Turner's total of five weeks at the top was the most by any act. Zac Brown Band was the only act to place three songs at the top of the chart, with "Highway 20 Ride" in April, "Free" in August and "As She's Walking Away", featuring Alan Jackson, in November. Five acts achieved their first number-one hits in 2010: Easton Corbin, Miranda Lambert, Luke Bryan, Jerrod Niemann and The Band Perry.

== Chart history ==
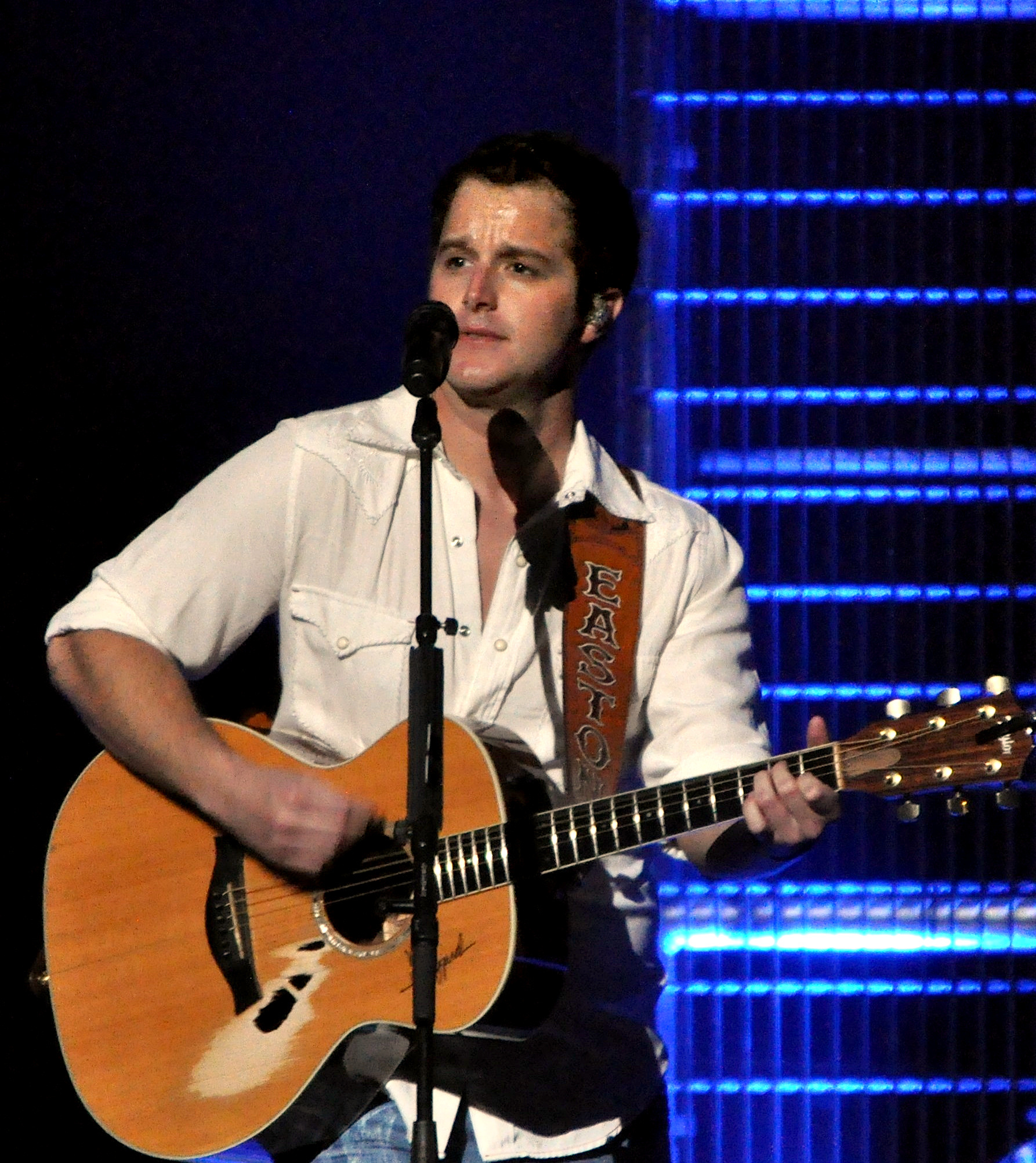
Easton Corbin took his debut single "A Little More Country Than That" to number one in April and followed it up with a second chart-topper in October.

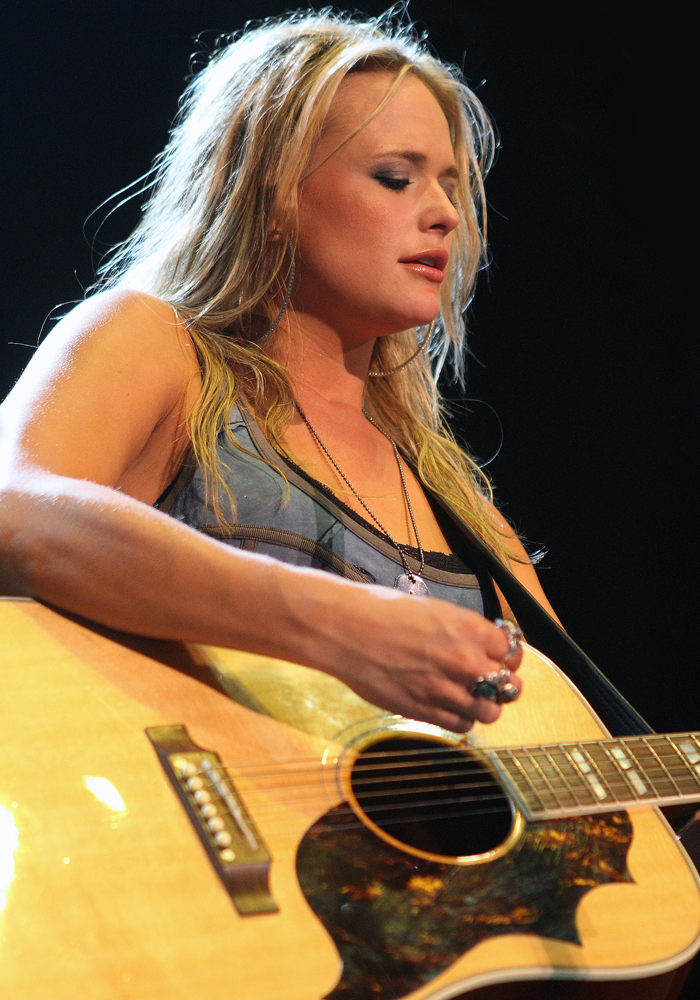
Miranda Lambert's "The House That Built Me" was one of three songs to spend four weeks at number one in 2010.

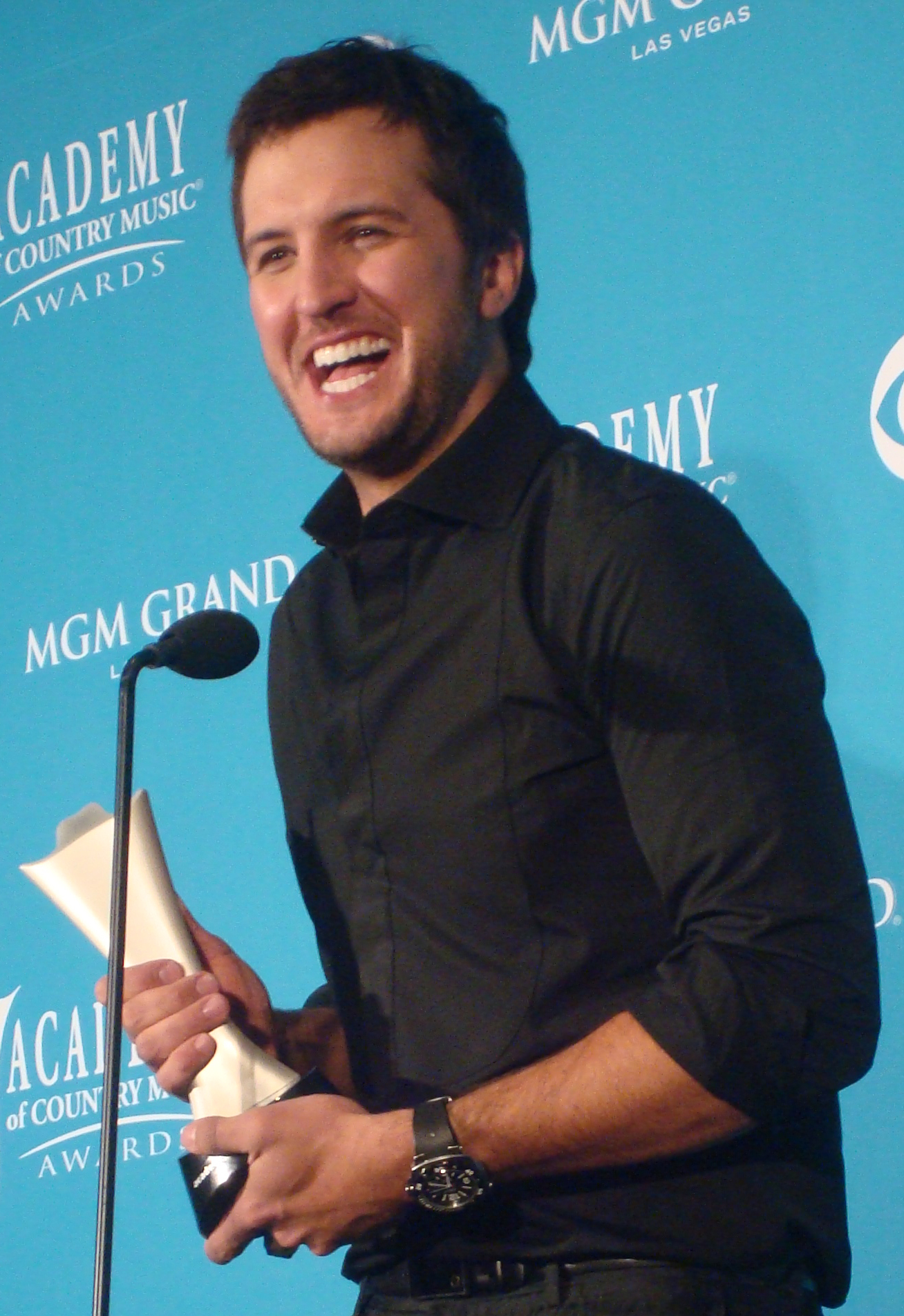
Luke Bryan reached number one for the first time with "Rain Is a Good Thing".

Table of number one songs
| Issue date | Title | Artist(s) | Ref. |
|---|---|---|---|
| January 2 | "Consider Me Gone" | Reba (Note: Reba McEntire was credited simply as Reba on this release.) | |
| January 9 | "Consider Me Gone" | Reba | |
| January 16 | "Consider Me Gone" | Reba | |
| January 23 | "Consider Me Gone" | Reba | |
| January 30 | "Southern Voice" | Tim McGraw | |
| February 6 | "The Truth" | Jason Aldean | |
| February 13 | "The Truth" | Jason Aldean | |
| February 20 | "Why Don't We Just Dance" | Josh Turner | |
| February 27 | "Why Don't We Just Dance" | Josh Turner | |
| March 6 | "Why Don't We Just Dance" | Josh Turner | |
| March 13 | "Why Don't We Just Dance" | Josh Turner | |
| March 20 | "That's How Country Boys Roll" | Billy Currington | |
| March 27 | "Hillbilly Bone" | Blake Shelton featuring Trace Adkins | |
| April 3 | "A Little More Country Than That" | Easton Corbin | |
| April 10 | "Temporary Home" | Carrie Underwood | |
| April 17 | "Highway 20 Ride" | Zac Brown Band | |
| April 24 | "American Honey" | Lady Antebellum | |
| May 1 | "American Honey" | Lady Antebellum | |
| May 8 | "Gimmie That Girl" | Joe Nichols | |
| May 15 | "Gimmie That Girl" | Joe Nichols | |
| May 22 | "The Man I Want to Be" | Chris Young | |
| May 29 | "The Man I Want to Be" | Chris Young | |
| June 5 | "The Man I Want to Be" | Chris Young | |
| June 12 | "The House That Built Me" | Miranda Lambert | |
| June 19 | "The House That Built Me" | Miranda Lambert | |
| June 26 | "The House That Built Me" | Miranda Lambert | |
| July 3 | "The House That Built Me" | Miranda Lambert | |
| July 10 | "Water" | Brad Paisley | |
| July 17 | "Water" | Brad Paisley | |
| July 24 | "Rain Is a Good Thing" | Luke Bryan | |
| July 31 | "Rain Is a Good Thing" | Luke Bryan | |
| August 7 | "Undo It" | Carrie Underwood | |
| August 14 | "Lover, Lover" | Jerrod Niemann | |
| August 21 | "Free" | Zac Brown Band | |
| August 28 | "All About Tonight" | Blake Shelton | |
| September 4 | "All About Tonight" | Blake Shelton | |
| September 11 | "All About Tonight" | Blake Shelton | |
| September 18 | "Pretty Good at Drinkin' Beer" | Billy Currington | |
| September 25 | "Our Kind of Love" | Lady Antebellum | |
| October 2 | "Our Kind of Love" | Lady Antebellum | |
| October 9 | "The Boys of Fall" | Kenny Chesney | |
| October 16 | "The Boys of Fall" | Kenny Chesney | |
| October 23 | "All Over Me" | Josh Turner | |
| October 30 | "Roll with It" | Easton Corbin | |
| November 6 | "Come Back Song" | Darius Rucker | |
| November 13 | "Come Back Song" | Darius Rucker | |
| November 20 | "As She's Walking Away" | Zac Brown Band featuring Alan Jackson | |
| November 27 | "As She's Walking Away" | Zac Brown Band featuring Alan Jackson | |
| December 4 | "Anything Like Me" | Brad Paisley | |
| December 11 | "If I Die Young" | The Band Perry | |
| December 18 | "Why Wait" | Rascal Flatts | |
| December 25 | "Why Wait" | Rascal Flatts | |

== See also ==
- 2010 in music
- List of artists who reached number one on the U.S. country chart
