= The Grohl Sessions, Vol. 1 =

EP by Zac Brown Band
- Released: December 10, 2013
- Genre: Country; country rock
- Length: 17:28
- Label: Southern Ground
- Producer: Dave Grohl

Zac Brown Band chronology
Uncaged (2012)	The Grohl Sessions, Vol. 1 (2013)	Greatest Hits So Far... (2014)

Singles from The Grohl Sessions, Vol. 1
- 1. "All Alright" Released: April 28, 2014

The Grohl Sessions, Vol. 1 is an extended play which was released by the Zac Brown Band on December 10, 2013. Originally released only to digital retailers, it was physically released on May 19, 2014. The physical release includes a 45-minute DVD on the creation of the album. Included on the album is the single "All Alright", which was sent to radio on April 28, 2014.

== Content ==
The Grohl Sessions, Vol. 1 is a four track extended play by the Zac Brown Band. Its four tracks are "Day for the Dead", "The Muse", "Let It Rain", and "All Alright".

In an interview with Rolling Stone, producer Dave Grohl stated, "They're unbelievable, the band is so good they can be tracked live; we didn't fuck with computers, we tracked live, four-part harmonies around one microphone. It's rocking. People are like, 'Oh, it's country.' 'No, it's not, it's like the Allman Brothers.' 'No, it's not, it's jam band.' I don't even know what you would call it, it's fucking great."

== Critical reception ==
Professional ratings
Aggregate scores
Source	Rating
Metacritic	(87/100)
Review scores
Source	Rating
Country Weekly	A
Entertainment Weekly	B+
Boston Globe	favorable
The New York Times	favorable
Roughstock	4.5/5 stars

The album received universal acclaim upon its release, holding an average 87 out of 100 rating on Metacritic.

== Track listing ==
No.	Title	Writer(s)	Length
1.	"All Alright"	Zac Brown, Eric Church, Jimmy De Martini, Wyatt Durrette, John Driskell Hopkins	4:23
2.	"Let It Rain"	Brown, Durrette, Brad Stella, De Martini, Clay Cook, Hopkins	4:22
3.	"The Muse"	Jano Rix, Chris Wood, Oliver Wood	3:45
4.	"Day for the Dead" (includes "I've Held the Devil's Hand", composed by Levi Lowrey)	Coy Bowles, Brown, Cook, Durrette, Levi Lowrey, Rich Robinson	4:47
Total length:			17:28

== Personnel ==
Compiled from liner notes.

Zac Brown Band

- Zac Brown – lead vocals, acoustic guitar, electric guitar
- Coy Bowles – slide guitar, Hammond organ
- Clay Cook – Hammond organ, Wurlitzer electric piano, clavinet, electric guitar
- Jimmy De Martini – fiddle, background vocals
- John Driskell Hopkins – acoustic guitar, electric guitar, background vocals
- Chris Fryar – drums except on "Let It Rain"
- Daniel de los Reyes – percussion

Guest musicians

- Dave Grohl – drums on "Let It Rain"
- Oteil Burbridge – bass guitar
- A. J. Ghent – electric guitar solo on "All Alright"

Technical

- Adam Ayan – mastering
- Dave Grohl – production
- Mike Fraser – engineering

== Chart performance ==
=== Weekly charts ===
Chart (2013)	Peak position
US Billboard 200	25
US Top Country Albums (Billboard)	5
US Independent Albums (Billboard)	3

=== Year-end charts ===
Chart (2014)	Position
US Top Country Albums (Billboard)	56
US Independent Albums (Billboard)	35
