= 1978 December =

Studio album by Sonia Leigh
- Released: September 27, 2011
- Genre: Country, Americana
- Length: 41:37
- Label: Southern Ground
- Producer: Zac Brown; John Driskell Hopkins; Clay Cook; Matt Mangano

Sonia Leigh chronology
| Angel on My Shoulder (2008) | 1978 December (2011) |

Singles from 1978 December
- 1. "My Name Is Money" Released: July 25, 2011; 2. "Bar" Released: March 12, 2012

Professional ratings
Review scores
| Source | Rating |
|---|---|
| Allmusic | 3.5/5 stars |

1978 December is the fifth studio album by American country music singer-songwriter Sonia Leigh. It was her first album on Southern Ground and was released on September 27, 2011. The first single off the album was "My Name Is Money," which Juli Thanki of Engine 145 gave a "thumbs up."

== Track listing ==
All songs written by Sonia Leigh; "I Won't Tell" and "Roamin'" co-written by Zac Brown.

| No. | Title | Length |
|---|---|---|
| 1. | "Ain't Dead Yet" | 4:17 |
| 2. | "My Name Is Money" | 3:33 |
| 3. | "Bar" | 4:13 |
| 4. | "Ribbon of Red" | 3:30 |
| 5. | "I Just Might" | 5:59 |
| 6. | "Virginia" (featuring Amy Ray) | 3:54 |
| 7. | "A Poem from the Ocean Floor" | 4:08 |
| 8. | "I Won't Tell" | 3:02 |
| 9. | "Roamin'" (featuring Zac Brown) | 4:21 |
| 10. | "1978 December" | 4:34 |
| Total length: | | 41:37 |

== Chart performance ==
=== Album ===
| Chart (2011) | Peak position |
|---|---|
| US Billboard Top Country Albums | 43 |
| US Billboard Top Heatseekers | 15 |

=== Singles ===
| Year | Single | Peak positions |
| Year | Single | US Country |
|---|---|---|
| 2011 | "My Name Is Money" | 45 |
| 2012 | "Bar" | — |
"—" denotes releases that did not chart

== Notes ==
In 2010, Bar was covered by Zac Brown Band although she was featured on there. It is evidenced on the track listing of Pass the Jar: Zac Brown Band and Friends Live from the Fabulous Fox Theatre In Atlanta.

== Personnel ==
Musicians

- Sonia Leigh – lead vocals, guitar (acoustic), percussion
- Zac Brown - guitar (acoustic), vocals
- Luke Bulla - fiddle
- Courtlan Clement - guitar (electric)
- Clay Cook - guitar (12 string acoustic), guitar (12 string electric), guitar (acoustic), guitar (baritone), guitar (electric), lap steel guitar, Mellotron, organ (Hammond) piano, vocals, Wurliter
- Nic Cowan - vocals
- Josh Day - percussion
- Donald Dunlavey - guitar (electric)
- Chris Fryar - drums, percussion
- Tom Giampietro - percussion
- Katie Herron - percussion
- John Driskell Hopkins - vocals
- Kevin Leahy - drums (steel), percussion
- Kristy Lee - vocals
- Levi Lowrey - vocals
- Matt Mangano - bass, guitar (acoustic)
- Amy Ray - vocals
- Barry Waldrep - banjo
- Tiffany White - vocals
- Oliver Wood - guitar (electric)

Technical

- Sonia Leigh - composer
- Zac Brown – producer, composer
- Clay Cook - producer
- John Driskell Hopkins - engineer, producer
- John Kelton - engineer, mixing
- Matt Mangano - engineer, producer
- Frank Sandler - engineer
- Hank Williams - mastering
