= The Comeback (Zac Brown Band album) =

Studio album by Zac Brown Band
- Released: October 15, 2021
- Recorded: 2021
- Genre: Country
- Length: 53:50
- Label: Home Grown Music; Warner Music Nashville
- Producer: Zac Brown; Ben Simonetti

Zac Brown Band chronology
The Owl (2019)	The Comeback (2021)	Love & Fear (2025)

Singles from The Comeback
- 1. "Same Boat" Released: June 11, 2021; 2. "Out in the Middle" Released: January 24, 2022

The Comeback is the seventh studio album by American country music group Zac Brown Band. The album was released on October 15, 2021, by Home Grown Music and Warner Music Nashville.

== Track listing ==
The Comeback track listing
No.	Title	Writer(s)	Length
1.	"Slow Burn"	Zac Brown; Ben Hayslip; Ben Simonetti	3:31
2.	"Out in the Middle"	Brown; Luke Combs; Simonetti; Jonathan Singleton	2:46
3.	"Wild Palomino"	Brown; Wyatt Durrette; Simonetti; Singleton	3:18
4.	"Us Against the World"	Brown; Simonetti; Singleton	3:12
5.	"Same Boat"	Brown; Simonetti; Singleton	3:10
6.	"Stubborn Pride" (featuring Marcus King)	Brown; Marcus King; Simonetti	7:08
7.	"Fun Having Fun"	Brown; Kenny Habul; Kurt Thomas; Simonetti	3:40
8.	"The Comeback"	Brown; Durrette; Ray Fulcher; Simonetti; Singleton	3:19
9.	"Old Love Song"	Brown; Combs; Simonetti; Singleton	3:31
10.	"Any Day Now"	Brown; Clay Cook; Josh Dunne; Fulcher; Simonetti; Singleton	3:13
11.	"Paradise Lost on Me"	Brown; Durrette; Simonetti; Singleton	2:24
12.	"GA Clay"	Brown; Durrette; Neil Mason; Simonetti; Singleton	3:42
13.	"Love and Sunsets"	Brown; Luke Dick; Simonetti	3:40
14.	"Closer to Heaven" (featuring Gregory Porter)	Brown; John Driskell Hopkins; Simonetti	3:58
15.	"Don't Let Your Heart"	Brown; Durrette; Levi Lowrey; Jimmy de Martini; Simonetti	3:18
Total length:			53:50

The Comeback (Deluxe) track listing
No.	Title	Length
1.	"Wild Palomino (Remix)" (featuring Cody Johnson)	3:19
2.	"Out in the Middle (Remix)" (featuring Blake Shelton)	2:46
3.	"Any Day Now (Remix)" (featuring Ingrid Andress)	3:14
4.	"Love and Sunsets (Remix)" (featuring James Taylor)	3:42
5.	"Stubborn Pride (Remix)" (featuring Jamey Johnson & Marcus King)	7:09
6.	"Same Boat (Remix)" (featuring Jimmy Buffett)	3:10

== Personnel ==
Adapted from liner notes.

=== Zac Brown Band ===
- Zac Brown – lead vocals (all tracks), acoustic guitar (all tracks except 9), electric guitar (track 12), Mellotron (track 15), programming (track 7), whistle (track 5), party claps (track 5)
- Coy Bowles – electric guitar (all tracks except 3 and 13), party claps (track 5)
- Clay Cook – harmony and background vocals (all tracks), electric guitar (all tracks except 3, 6, and 13), acoustic guitar (tracks 4, 9, 10), Hammond organ (tracks 1–6, 8–11, 13, 14), pedal steel guitar (track 3), piano (tracks 7, 10, 15), synthesizer (track 10), drums (track 10), party claps (track 5)
- John Driskell Hopkins – background vocals (all tracks except 3), electric guitar (all tracks except 3 and 13), party claps (track 5)
- Jimmy DeMartini – harmony and background vocals (all tracks), fiddle (all tracks except 6), party claps (track 5)
- Daniel de los Reyes – percussion (all tracks), party claps (track 5)
- Chris Fryar – drums (tracks 1–3, 5–10, 12, 14), party claps (track 5)
- Matt Mangano – bass guitar (all tracks), background vocals (track 10), party claps (track 5)

=== Additional musicians ===
- Kyshona Armstrong – background vocals (tracks 6, 8, 12)
- Dr. Richard Bland – background vocals (tracks 4, 5), party claps (track 5)
- Nickie Conley – background vocals (tracks 6, 8, 12)
- Paul Franklin – pedal steel guitar (tracks 1, 3, 13)
- Austin Hoke – cello (tracks 10, 13, 14)
- Evan Hutchings – drums (tracks 3, 4, 11, 13, 15)
- Marcus King – acoustic guitar (track 6), electric guitar (track 6), duet vocals (track 6 + Deluxe Edition track 5)
- Dirk Lemmenes – background vocals (tracks 4, 5), party claps (track 5)
- Maureen Murphy – background vocals (tracks 6, 8, 12)
- Gregory Porter – duet vocals (track 14 + Deluxe Edition track 20)
- Eric Roderick – background vocals (tracks 4, 5), party claps (track 5)
- Ben Simonetti – Hammond organ (track 10), mellotron (track 14), percussion (track 13), programming (tracks 7, 10, 15), background vocals (tracks 4, 5), party claps (track 5)
- Ilya Toshinsky – acoustic guitar (tracks 3, 13), banjo (track 13)
- James Willis – background vocals (tracks 4, 5), party claps (track 5)
- Cody Johnson – duet vocals (Deluxe Edition track 1)
- Blake Shelton – duet vocals (Deluxe Edition track 2)
- Ingrid Andress – duet vocals (Deluxe Edition track 3)
- James Taylor – duet vocals (Deluxe Edition track 4)
- Jamey Johnson – duet vocals (Deluxe Edition track 5)
- Jimmy Buffett – duet vocals (Deluxe Edition track 6)

== Charts ==
=== Weekly charts ===
Weekly chart performance for The Comeback
Chart (2021)	Peak position
Australian Albums (ARIA)	42
Canadian Albums (Billboard)	64
Swiss Albums (Schweizer Hitparade)	63
US Billboard 200	27
US Top Country Albums (Billboard)	3

=== Year-end charts ===
Year-end chart performance for The Comeback
Chart (2021)	Position
US Top Country Albums (Billboard)	91
