= Greatest Hits So Far =

Greatest Hits So Far may refer to:

- The Greatest Hits, So Far, an album by Public Image Ltd 1990
- Greatest Hits... So Far!!! (Pink album), 2010
- Greatest Hits So Far... (Zac Brown Band album), 2014

== See also ==
- List of "Greatest Hits" albums
