= Uncaged =

Studio album by Zac Brown Band
- Released: July 10, 2012
- Recorded: 2012 in Atlanta, Nashville, Asheville, Key West
- Genres: Country; country rock
- Length: 44:08
- Labels: Atlantic; RPM; Southern Ground
- Producers: Zac Brown; Keith Stegall

Zac Brown Band chronology
You Get What You Give (2010)	Uncaged (2012)	Jekyll + Hyde (2015)

Singles from Uncaged
- 1. "The Wind" Released: June 4, 2012; 2. "Goodbye in Her Eyes" Released: October 1, 2012; 3. "Jump Right In" Released: February 25, 2013; 4. "Sweet Annie" Released: August 26, 2013

Uncaged is the third studio album by American country music group Zac Brown Band. It was released on July 10, 2012. The album's lead single, "The Wind" was released on June 6, 2012. The album received widely positive reviews from critics and debuted at number one on the Billboard 200. At the 2013 Grammy Awards, it won the award for Best Country Album.

== Background ==
Zac Brown called the album "Your basic country-Southern rock-bluegrass-reggae-jam record" saying "It's really about making people dance, you just don't let them go. There's a lot of songs on the record that when we play them live we'll extend out long. But it's really about just grabbing people in that pulse and then not letting them go that entire song." Clay Cook said "This is first record that we’ve made from start to finish in one thought, the previous albums have been a collection of songs … this is an album.”

== Artwork ==
The cover features artist Brandon Maldonado's 2009 Our Lady of Merciful Fate.

== Critical reception ==
Professional ratings
Aggregate scores
Source	Rating
Metacritic	(71/100)
Review scores
Source	Rating
About.com	3.5/5 stars
AllMusic	4/5 stars
American Songwriter	3.5/5 stars
Consequence of Sound	3/5 stars
Daily News	2/5 stars
Los Angeles Times	2.5/4 stars
Rolling Stone	2.5/5 stars
Roughstock	5/5 stars
Slant Magazine	4/5 stars
Taste of Country	4/5 stars
USA Today	4/4 stars

Upon its release, Uncaged received generally positive reviews from most music critics. At Metacritic, which assigns a normalized rating out of 100 to reviews from mainstream critics, the album received an average score of 72, based on 10 reviews, which indicates "generally favorable reviews".

The positive reviews came from About.com, AbsolutePunk, AllMusic, American Songwriter, Entertainment Weekly, Los Angeles Times, Roughstock, Slant Magazine, Tampa Bay Times, Taste of Country and the USA Today. Robert Silva of About.com gave it a three and a half out of five stars, writing that "Overall, Uncaged is a more low-key effort than either The Foundation or You Get What You Give. There's a fair amount of genre-hopping on the album, but it feels authentic for a band that's always played outside the confines of the country box." Gregory Robson of AbsolutePunk gave it a score of 87 percent, calling "Uncaged, a genre-bending, head-turning collection that vaults ZBB to the top of the roots-rock pedestal." Stephen Thomas Erlewine of AllMusic rated it four stars out of five stars, calling it "the sound of a band operating from a position of considerable strength". Jeff Giles of American Songwriter rated the album a three and a half out of five stars, and writes of the album, "Uncaged is an album that proves a successful country artist really can have it all — that it’s possible to tastefully blend the sensitive singer/songwriter tropes of Laurel Canyon artists like James Taylor, the faux Caribbean pandering of Jimmy Buffett, the deeply felt roots excursions of the Avett Brothers, and the smartly crafted pop concessions of Jason Mraz." Melissa Maerz of Entertainment Weekly gave then album a B grade, writing that the album "isn't so much a folksy jam-band opus as a savvy industry professional's idea of what that should sound like." Randy Lewis of the Los Angeles Times gave the album a two and a half out of four stars, calling it "modestly refreshing." Matt Bjorke of Roughstock gave the album a perfect five rating, noting that "Uncaged is without a doubt the best album of this band's career and make no mistake, the Zac Brown Band are clearly a band in every sense of the word...Uncaged only enhances their status as the best band in country music." Jonathan Keefe of Slant Magazine rated the album a four out of five stars, noting how "there's something to be said for an album that's such a refreshing and clean break from what has become country music's rather depressing norm." Sean Daily of The Tampa Bay Times graded the album a B−, noting how "the chase is over." Billy Dukes of Taste of Country rated the album a four out of five stars, writing that "On paper, ‘Uncaged’ should not work as an album, let alone a country music album. The new release from Zac Brown Band redefines “something for everybody.” Country, reggae, bedroom R&B… Brown and his ever-growing motley crew stretch the Nashville sound further than any other artist. If they weren’t so talented, this project would fall apart long before the title-track...Yet somehow, it doesn’t [sic]." Brian Mansfield of USA Today rated the album a perfect four stars, writing that "Most country acts find a successful formula, then stick pretty closely to it. Uncaged, Brown's third major-label studio set, is just all over the place, a big, happy, sprawling musical celebration that encompasses square-dance and samba rhythms, California country-rock and sultry Southern soul."

The mixed reviews were from Consequence of Sound, Daily News and the Rolling Stone. Jon Bernstein of Consequence of Sound rated the album a three out of five stars, writing that "...if there’s anything at fault with Brown’s latest, it’s the trap of lapsing into self-satisfaction with the way in which the band defies labeling." Jim Farber of the Daily News rated the album a two out of five stars, writing that "At least the surface of Brown’s songs can modestly please." Chuck Eddy of the Rolling Stone rated the album a two and a half out of five stars, writing that "Uncaged, sounds, well, caged."

== Commercial performance ==
Uncaged debuted at number one on the US Billboard 200, selling 234,000 copies in its first week of release, giving them their second number one album and best sales week yet. In its second week, it sold 78,000 copies, falling to number 2. In its third week of release, it sold an additional 48,000 copies, returning to number one on the chart. The album was specially priced for $3.99 at the Amazon MP3 store for its first week of release, which some sources suggest may have contributed around 25,000 to 30,000 of its debut number. In Canada, the album debuted at number one on the Canadian Albums Chart, selling 8,100 copies, the band's first number one in Canada. Uncaged was certified Platinum by the RIAA on November 20, 2013, and as of September 2015, it has sold 1,200,000 copies in the United States.

== Track listing ==
No.	Title	Writer(s)	Length
1.	"Jump Right In"	Zac Brown; Wyatt Durrette; Jason Mraz	3:00
2.	"Uncaged"	Brown; Durrette; Coy Bowles; Nic Cowan; John Driskell Hopkins; Jimmy De Martini	3:30
3.	"Goodbye in Her Eyes"	Brown; Durrette; Hopkins; Sonia Leigh	5:24
4.	"The Wind"	Brown; Durrette; Levi Lowrey	2:56
5.	"Island Song"	Cowan	3:43
6.	"Sweet Annie"	Brown; Durrette; Leigh; John Pierce	4:38
7.	"Natural Disaster"	Brown; Durrette	3:02
8.	"Overnight" (featuring Trombone Shorty)	Brown; Cowan	4:44
9.	"Lance's Song"	Brown; Cowan	4:35
10.	"Day That I Die" (featuring Amos Lee)	Brown; Cowan; Durrette	4:53
11.	"Last But Not Least"	Brown; Durrette; Bowles; De Martini; Mac McAnally	3:42
Total length:			44:08

== Personnel ==
Zac Brown Band

- Coy Bowles – electric guitar, slide guitar, resonator guitar, Hammond organ
- Zac Brown – lead vocals, acoustic guitar, electric guitar
- Clay Cook – backing vocals, acoustic guitar, electric guitar, Hammond organ, piano, Fender Rhodes electric piano, pedal steel guitar, co-lead vocals on "Last But Not Least"
- Jimmy de Martini – backing vocals, violin
- John Driskell Hopkins – backing vocals, bass guitar, double bass
- Chris Fryar – drums
- Daniel de los Reyes – congas, shakers, timbales, cowbell, tambourine, chimes, triangle

Guest musicians

- Matt Mangano – bass guitar on "Island Song"
- Tim McFatter – tenor saxophone on "Overnight"
- Dan Oestreicher – baritone saxophone on "Overnight"
- Trombone Shorty – trombone and trumpet on "Overnight"
- Amos Lee – co-lead vocals on "The Day That I Die"

== Charts and certifications ==
=== Weekly charts ===
Chart (2012–2013)	Peak position
Australian Albums Chart	38
Australian Country Albums Chart	2
Canadian Albums Chart	1
UK Albums Chart	92
UK Country Albums Chart	4
US Billboard 200	1
US Billboard Top Country Albums	1

=== Year-end charts ===
Chart (2012)	Position
US Billboard 200	35
US Top Country Albums (Billboard)	10

Chart (2013)	Position
US Billboard 200	69
US Top Country Albums (Billboard)	17

Chart (2014)	Position
US Billboard 200	179
US Top Country Albums (Billboard)	45

=== Decade-end charts ===
Chart (2010–2019)	Position
US Billboard 200	140

=== Certifications ===
Region	Certification	Certified units/sales
Canada (Music Canada)	Gold	40,000^{^}
United States (RIAA)	Platinum	1,200,000
^{^} Shipments figures based on certification alone.
