= The Foundation (Zac Brown Band album) =

Studio album by Zac Brown Band
- Released: November 18, 2008
- Studios: Brighter Shade Studio, Atlanta, GA; Compass Point Studios, Nassau, Bahamas; The Sound Station Nashville, TN; Wedgewood Sound.
- Genre: Country
- Length: 42:42
- Labels: Atlantic; Home Grown; Southern Ground; Big Picture
- Producers: Zac Brown; Keith Stegall

Zac Brown Band chronology
The Foundation (2008)	You Get What You Give (2010)

Singles from The Foundation
- 1. "Chicken Fried" Released: June 16, 2008; 2. "Whatever It Is" Released: January 24, 2009; 3. "Toes" Released: July 6, 2009; 4. "Highway 20 Ride" Released: November 23, 2009; 5. "Free" Released: April 12, 2010

Professional ratings
Review scores
Source	Rating
Allmusic	3/5 stars
Engine 145	3.5/5 stars
Billboard	(favorable)

The Foundation is the first major-label studio album by American country music band Zac Brown Band. It was released on November 18, 2008. Originally slated for release on the Home Grown label and Big Picture Records, the album is distributed by Atlantic Nashville in association with those two labels. The financing for the album was provided by Atlanta, GA entrepreneur Braden Copeland through his investment company Braden Copeland Ventures, LLC. On December 2, 2009, the album was nominated for the Grammy Award for Best Country Album. and also earned the band the Grammy Award for Best New Artist on January 31. The album also has been nominated for the 2010 Academy of Country Music Awards "Album of the Year" award. As of September 2015, the album has sold 3.4 million copies in the US. It is the only album to feature Joel Williams, who left the band prior to its release.

== Content ==
The album includes five singles, starting with "Chicken Fried," which the band had previously recorded on its 2005 self-released album Home Grown. One year later, The Lost Trailers released this song as a single on BNA Records, but the label withdrew the single after Brown changed his mind about licensing the song. The Zac Brown Band's rendition became a Number One country hit on the Billboard Hot Country Songs charts in December 2008.

Four further singles were released from the album – "Whatever It Is," "Toes," "Highway 20 Ride" and "Free" – the latter three of which were also Number One hits. Additionally, "Different Kind of Fine" also entered the chart as an album cut from unsolicited airplay, where it reached number 55.

== Track listing ==
No.	Title	Writer(s)	Length
1.	"Toes"	Zac Brown; Wyatt Durrette; John Driskell Hopkins; Shawn Mullins	4:21
2.	"Whatever It Is"	Brown; Durrette	3:29
3.	"Where the Boat Leaves From"	Brown; Durrette	3:44
4.	"Violin Intro to Free"	Jimmy De Martini	1:01
5.	"Free"	Brown	3:48
6.	"Chicken Fried"	Brown; Durrette	3:58
7.	"Mary"	Brown; Joseph Cline	2:50
8.	"Different Kind of Fine"	Brown; Durrette; Nielson	3:18
9.	"Highway 20 Ride"	Brown; Durrette	3:51
10.	"It's Not OK"	Hopkins	4:10
11.	"Jolene"	Ray LaMontagne	4:21
12.	"Sic 'Em on a Chicken"	Brown; Hopkins	3:51
Total length:			42:42

== Personnel ==
- Zac Brown – acoustic guitar, lead vocals, background vocals
- Jimmy De Martini – fiddle, background vocals
- Greenwood Hart – keyboards, Hammond B-3 organ, accordion
- John Driskell Hopkins – bass guitar, background vocals, second lead vocals on "It's Not OK"
- Brent Mason – electric guitar
- Marcus Petruska – drums, percussion, background vocals
- Gary Prim – keyboards, Hammond B-3 organ
- Joel Williams – electric guitar

== Charts ==
=== Weekly charts ===
Chart (2008–09)	Peak position
US Billboard 200	9
US Top Country Albums (Billboard)	2

=== Year-end charts ===
Chart (2009)	Position
US Billboard 200	14
US Top Country Albums (Billboard)	2
Chart (2010)	Position
US Billboard 200	17
US Top Country Albums (Billboard)	5
Chart (2011)	Position
US Billboard 200	68
US Top Country Albums (Billboard)	18
Chart (2012)	Position
US Billboard 200	111
Chart (2013)	Position
US Billboard 200	144
Chart (2025)	Position
US Top Country Albums (Billboard)	74

=== Decade-end charts ===
Chart (2010–2019)	Position
US Billboard 200	107
US Top Country Albums (Billboard)	27

== Certifications ==
Certifications for The Foundation
Region	Certification	Certified units/sales
Canada (Music Canada)	Platinum	80,000^{‡}
United States (RIAA)	5× Platinum	5,000,000^{‡}
^{‡} Sales+streaming figures based on certification alone.
