= Jump Right In =

Single by Zac Brown Band

from the album Uncaged
- Released: February 25, 2013
- Genre: Country
- Length: 3:00
- Label: Atlantic; Southern Ground
- Songwriters: Zac Brown; Wyatt Durrette; Jason Mraz
- Producers: Zac Brown; Keith Stegall

Zac Brown Band singles chronology
"Goodbye in Her Eyes" (2012)	"Jump Right In" (2013)	"Sweet Annie" (2013)

"Jump Right In" is a song recorded by American country music group Zac Brown Band. It was released in February 2013 as the third single from the group's third major-label album, Uncaged. The song was written by Zac Brown, Wyatt Durrette, and Jason Mraz.

== Content ==
The song is an up-tempo song about relaxing on a beach.

== Critical reception ==
Matt Bjorke of Roughstock gave the song a favorable review, saying that "they blend southern rock, 70s AC pop and percussive singer/songwriter fare into a blender and sprinkle in fantastic harmony with country music lyrics to craft a song that truly showcases virtually everything that Zac Brown Band is in." On the same site, Bobby Peacock rated it 4½ stars out of 5, praising the "refreshing, relaxing yet energetic arrangement" and "authentically Caribbean beat". Giving it a "B", Jon Freeman of Country Weekly thought that the similarly-themed "Toes" and "Knee Deep" were superior songs, but that "Jump Right In" is "pleasant enough, featuring the band's perfect harmonies and exotic, loose-limbed rhythms." A less favorable review came from Billy Dukes of Taste of Country, who gave the song two and a half stars out of five and said that "it’s a feel-good song, but one that’s maybe too familiar, especially to passive fans of the group who have only bought the occasional single or just enjoyed ZBB on the radio."

== Music video ==
The music video was directed by Cole Cassell and premiered in May 2013. It features American TV and Film actress Carmela Zumbado.

== Chart performance ==
"Jump Right In" debuted at number 59 on the U.S. Billboard Country Airplay chart for the week of February 2, 2013. It also debuted at number 46 on the U.S. Billboard Hot Country Songs chart for the week of March 23, 2013. It also debuted at number 99 on the U.S. Billboard Hot 100 chart for the week of May 11, 2013. It also debuted at number 85 on the Canadian Hot 100 chart for the week of June 15, 2013. As of July 17, 2013, the single has sold 299,000 copies in the United States.

Chart (2013)	Peak position
Canada Hot 100 (Billboard)	63
Canada Country (Billboard)	3
US Billboard Hot 100	53
US Country Airplay (Billboard)	2
US Hot Country Songs (Billboard)	13

=== Year-end charts ===
Chart (2013)	Position
US Country Airplay (Billboard)	23
US Hot Country Songs (Billboard)	50
