= No Hurry =

Single by Zac Brown Band

from the album You Get What You Give
- Released: January 16, 2012
- Genre: Country
- Length: 3:46
- Label: Atlantic; Bigger Picture Music Group; Southern Ground
- Songwriters: Zac Brown; Wyatt Durrette; James Otto
- Producers: Zac Brown; Keith Stegall

Zac Brown Band singles chronology
"Keep Me in Mind" (2011)	"No Hurry" (2012)	"The Wind" (2012)

"No Hurry" is a song recorded by American country music group Zac Brown Band. It was released in January 2012 as the fifth and final single from the group's second major-label album, 2010's You Get What You Give. The song was written by Zac Brown, Wyatt Durrette and James Otto.

== Background and writing ==
Durrette told Taste of Country that the idea of the song came to him while driving to meet a friend at the Georgia Aquarium. He said that he started to think about "a small list of things [he] probably should’ve been doing instead". Having come up with a first verse, he presented it to James Otto, who helped him on the melody, second verse and chorus before Brown finished the song.

== Content ==
In "No Hurry", the narrator sings about relaxing to forget about his daily problems, and that he "ain't in no hurry today".

== Critical reception ==
Giving it four-and-a-half stars out of five, Bobby Peacock of Roughstock wrote that "If anyone can convince me that he's really going fishing to take the weight of the world off his mind, it's Zac Brown." He also praised the song for being "unhurried, laid back without feeling lethargic." Billy Dukes of Taste of Country gave the song two and a half stars out of five, saying that "the weighty instrumentation and pacing of the ballad doesn't quite jive [sic] with the carefree message" and that "one's left feeling … nothing, really, despite sharp and colorful lyrics."

== Music video ==
The music video was directed by Cole Cassell and premiered in May 2012.

== Chart performance ==
"No Hurry" debuted at number 51 on the U.S. Billboard Hot Country Songs chart for the week of February 4, 2012. It soon peaked at number 2 on that chart for the week of June 2, 2012, behind "Somethin' 'bout a Truck" by Kip Moore. It also debuted at number 96 on the U.S. Billboard Hot 100 chart for the week of March 24, 2012. It also debuted at number 99 on Canadian Hot 100 chart for the week of April 28, 2012. With a peak of number 2 on the country chart, the song became the Zac Brown Band's first single to miss Number One since "Whatever It Is" also peaked at number 2 in mid-2009.

Chart (2012)	Peak position
Canada Country (Billboard)	6
Canada Hot 100 (Billboard)	72
US Billboard Hot 100	50
US Hot Country Songs (Billboard)	2

=== Year-end charts ===
Chart (2012)	Position
US Country Songs (Billboard)	24
