= All Alright =

Single by Zac Brown Band

from the album The Grohl Sessions, Vol. 1
- Released: April 28, 2014
- Genre: Country
- Length: 4:23
- Label: Southern Ground
- Songwriter(s): Zac Brown; Eric Church; Jimmy De Martini; Wyatt Durrette; John Driskell Hopkins
- Producer(s): Dave Grohl

Zac Brown Band singles chronology
"Sweet Annie" (2013)	"All Alright" (2014)	"Homegrown" (2015)

"All Alright" is a song recorded by the American country music group Zac Brown Band. It was released on April 28, 2014, and is the first single from the band's second extended play, The Grohl Sessions, Vol. 1.

== Content ==
The song is about a man who feels conflict over a relationship, saying that it was "all alright, now it's all wrong." Band members Zac Brown, Jimmy De Martin, and John Driskell Hopkins wrote the song with Wyatt Durrette, who had written several other songs for the Zac Brown Band, and Eric Church. A. J. Ghent plays an electric guitar solo.

== Commercial reception ==
Up to July 30, 2014, the song had sold 58,000 copies.

== Critical reception ==
Alanna Conaway of Roughstock gave the single a positive review, stating that it is likely to add another huge hit to the band's ten number one hits and that it was one of the best singles of 2014. Jon Freeman of Country Weekly rated it "B+", praising the Southern rock influences of the production and the "impressionistic metaphors" of the lyric, but adding, "It also comes with a challenging, rangy melody that exposes some of the typically solid Zac's weaknesses as a vocalist. But the band's musicianship is as impressive as ever."

== Music video ==
The music video was directed by Cole Cassell and was premiered in July 2014.

== Chart performance ==
"All Alright" debuted at number 53 on the U.S. Billboard Country Airplay chart for the week of May 10, 2014 and at number 44 on the U.S. Billboard Hot Country Songs chart for the week of May 31, 2014. The song peaked at number 17 on Country Airplay.

Chart (2014)	Peak position
Canada Country (Billboard)	40
US Bubbling Under Hot 100 (Billboard)	5
US Country Airplay (Billboard)	17
US Hot Country Songs (Billboard)	24

=== Year-end charts ===
Chart (2014)	Position
US Country Airplay (Billboard)	69
US Hot Country Songs (Billboard)	79
