= The Wind (Zac Brown Band song) =

Single by Zac Brown Band

from the album Uncaged
- Released: June 4, 2012
- Genre: Bluegrass; country; folk
- Length: 2:57
- Label: Atlantic; RPM; Southern Ground
- Songwriters: Zac Brown; Wyatt Durrette; Levi Lowrey
- Producers: Keith Stegall; Zac Brown

Zac Brown Band singles chronology
| "No Hurry" (2012) | "The Wind" (2012) | "Goodbye in Her Eyes" (2012) |

"The Wind" is a song recorded by American country music group Zac Brown Band. It was released in June 2012 as the first single from the group's third major-label album, Uncaged, which was released on July 10. The song was written by Zac Brown, Wyatt Durrette and Levi Lowrey.

== Critical reception ==
The song was acclaimed by country music critics. Billy Dukes of Taste of Country gave the song four and a half stars out of five, writing that "if you slow down and listen to what the man in the beanie is saying, you’re rewarded with a detailed, heartbreaking story." Matt Bjorke of Roughstock also gave the song four and a half stars out of five, saying that "there are great harmonies wrapped up in a melody that is both contemporary country and traditional country-leaning at the same time."

== Music video ==
The music video was directed by Beavis and Butthead and King of the Hill creator Mike Judge, animated by Titmouse, Inc., and premiered in July 2012. It features animated versions of the band, with Zac Brown transformed into "a beer chugging cyborg".

== Chart performance ==
"The Wind" debuted at number 27 on the U.S. Billboard Hot Country Songs chart for the week of June 23, 2012, the second-highest debut by a group of the SoundScan era. It ultimately peaked at number 11 in August 2012, making it the group's first single to miss the top 10 on the Hot Country Songs chart.

| Chart (2012) | Peak position |
|---|---|
| Canada Country (Billboard) | 4 |
| Canada Hot 100 (Billboard) | 68 |
| US Billboard Hot 100 | 70 |
| US Hot Country Songs (Billboard) | 11 |

=== Year-end charts ===
| Chart (2012) | Position |
|---|---|
| US Country Songs (Billboard) | 60 |
