= Same Boat =

2021 single by Zac Brown Band

Single by Zac Brown Band

from the album The Comeback
- Released: June 11, 2021
- Studio: Southern Ground
- Genre: Country
- Length: 3:10
- Label: BBR
- Songwriters: Zac Brown; Ben Simonetti; Jonathan Singleton
- Producers: Zac Brown; Ben Simonetti

Zac Brown Band singles chronology
| "The Man Who Loves You the Most" (2020) | "Same Boat" (2021) | "Out in the Middle" (2022) |

Music video
- "Same Boat" on YouTube

"Same Boat" is a song recorded by American country music group Zac Brown Band. It was released on June 11, 2021, and released to country radio on June 14, 2021. The song was co-written by Jonathan Singleton, Ben Simonetti and Zac Brown, and produced by Brown and Simonetti. It is the lead single from their seventh studio album The Comeback. This is the band's first number one single on Country Airplay since "Beautiful Drug" in 2016, and their fourteenth overall. In September 2022, the band re-released The Comeback with a bonus remix of the song featuring guest vocals from Jimmy Buffett.

== Background ==
Lead vocalist Brown said in a statement: "'Same Boat' is about how we all go through the same things, all together. It is a chance to be able to remind people to be positive, be good to each other and show empathy. You don't know what it's like to walk around in someone else's shoes. We're all human beings. Let's spread some love around and show kindness to each other."

== Music video ==
The music video was released on August 6, 2021, and was directed by Spidey Smith. It was filmed in Moore Haven, Florida, and showcases individuals from all walks of life.

== Charts ==
=== Weekly charts ===
Weekly chart performance for "Same Boat"
| Chart (2021) | Peak position |
|---|---|
| Australia Country Hot 50 (TMN) | 4 |
| Canada Hot 100 (Billboard) | 55 |
| Canada Country (Billboard) | 3 |
| US Billboard Hot 100 | 48 |
| US Country Airplay (Billboard) | 1 |
| US Hot Country Songs (Billboard) | 8 |

=== Year-end charts ===
2021 year-end chart performance for "Same Boat"
| Chart (2021) | Position |
|---|---|
| US Country Airplay (Billboard) | 56 |
| US Hot Country Songs (Billboard) | 65 |

2022 year-end chart performance for "Same Boat"
| Chart (2022) | Position |
|---|---|
| US Hot Country Songs (Billboard) | 85 |

== Certifications ==
Certifications for "Same Boat"
| Region | Certification | Certified units/sales |
|---|---|---|
| Canada (Music Canada) | Gold | 40,000^{‡} |
| United States (RIAA) | Gold | 500,000^{‡} |
^{‡} Sales+streaming figures based on certification alone.
