= Someone I Used to Know =

2018 song by Zac Brown Band

Single by Zac Brown Band

from the album The Owl
- Released: November 9, 2018
- Genre: Country; EDM
- Length: 3:29
- Label: BBR
- Songwriters: Zac Brown; Niko Moon; Andrew Watt; Ben Simonetti; Shawn Mendes
- Producers: Andrew Watt; Happy Perez

Zac Brown Band singles chronology
"Roots" (2018)	"Someone I Used to Know" (2018)	"Leaving Love Behind" (2020)

Music video
- "Someone I Used to Know" on YouTube

"Someone I Used to Know" is a song by American country music band Zac Brown Band. As a single from their sixth studio album The Owl. The song was written by Zac Brown, Niko Moon, Ben Simonetti, Andrew Watt, Shawn Mendes and produced by Andrew Watt and Happy Perez.

== Background ==
The song was co-written by Shawn Mendes, with whom the band got acquainted during their performance on CMT Crossroads. Zac said: "Shawn is an incredibly talented artist and it's been exciting to watch his career rise over the past few years. We've had fun collaborating together, this Crossroads will be very special with huge vocals and musicality. It will be unexpected and something that both sets of fans will enjoy."

== Music video ==
The music video was uploaded on December 21, 2018, directed by Phillip R Lopez. The video told a story about a high school football star who enlists, goes to war and returns with post-traumatic stress disorder, and it opened with a vivid sex scene and featured an interlude in which the main character and his fellow troops are attacked while on patrol. Upon his return home, he struggles with relationships, employment and his underlying PTSD.

== Commercial performance ==
The song has sold 90,000 copies in the United States as of October 2019.

== Live performance ==
On June 5, 2019, Zac Brown Band performed the song on CMT Music Awards

== Charts ==
=== Weekly charts ===
Weekly chart performance for "Someone I Used to Know"
Chart (2018–2019)	Peak position
US Bubbling Under Hot 100 (Billboard)	8
US Country Airplay (Billboard)	29
US Hot Country Songs (Billboard)	23
US Dance Club Songs (Billboard)	5

=== Year-end charts ===
2019 year-end chart performance for "Someone I Used to Know"
Chart (2019)	Position
US Hot Country Songs (Billboard)	79
