= The Owl (album) =

2019 studio album by Zac Brown Band

Studio album by Zac Brown Band
- Released: September 20, 2019
- Genre: Pop; EDM; country; R&B
- Length: 37:39
- Label: BBR; Wheelhouse; BMG
- Producer: Coy Bowles; Zac Brown; Johan Carlsson; Andrew DeRoberts; Matt Mangano; Max Martin; Happy Perez; Poo Bear; Skrillex; Shawn Mendes; Sasha Sirota; Ryan Tedder; Andrew Watt

Zac Brown Band chronology
| Welcome Home (2017) | The Owl (2019) | The Comeback (2021) |

Singles from The Owl
- 1. "Someone I Used to Know" Released: November 9, 2018; 2. "Leaving Love Behind" Released: January 13, 2020

The Owl is the sixth studio album by American country music band Zac Brown Band. It was released on September 20, 2019, through Wheelhouse Records.

== Content ==
It is described as the band's "most personal album to date". For this album, the band worked with pop and EDM writer and producers such as Poo Bear, Shawn Mendes, Max Martin, Benny Blanco, Ryan Tedder, and Skrillex. One of the tracks features a collaboration with Brandi Carlile.

== Critical reception ==
Kelly Dearmore of the blog Sounds Like Nashville gave a largely negative review, criticizing the lack of country sound relative to the band's preceding albums and comparing many songs negatively to Brown's electronica side project Sir Rosevelt. Stephen Thomas Erlewine of AllMusic also noted parallels to the Sir Rosevelt album. He concluded his review with "The fact that a good chunk of the numbers work does not erase how deeply strange this album is."

Pip Ellwood-Hughes of Entertainment Focus gave a negative review stating, "Zac Brown Band have shown what they can do in the past and this set of songs doesn't come close. If this were the debut album of a new pop band, it may be received kindlier but this is a misjudged project from a beloved Country band that attempts to push boundaries but will likely just turn their fans off."

== Commercial performance ==
The Owl debuted at number two on the US Billboard 200 with 106,000 album-equivalent units, including 99,000 pure album sales. It is Zac Brown Band's sixth US top 10 album. The album has sold 137,100 copies in the United States as of March 2020.

== Track listing ==
| No. | Title | Writer(s) | Producer | Length |
|---|---|---|---|---|
| 1. | "The Woods" | Zac Brown; Corey Crowder; Sasha Sirota | Brown; Sasha Sirota | 3:14 |
| 2. | "Need This" | Brown; Jason Boyd; Caroline Jones; Andrew DeRoberts; Ryan Tedder | Brown; DeRoberts; Poo Bear; Tedder | 2:41 |
| 3. | "OMW" | Brown; Boyd; Sirota; Sonny Moore | Brown; Skrillex; Poo Bear; Sirota | 3:20 |
| 4. | "Someone I Used to Know" | Brown; Shawn Mendes; Niko Moon; Andrew Watt; Ben Simonetti | Watt; Happy Perez | 3:29 |
| 5. | "Me and the Boys in the Band" | Brown; Clay Cook; Luke Laird | Brown; Bowles; Poo Bear | 4:40 |
| 6. | "Finish What We Started" (featuring Brandi Carlile) | Brown; Johan Carlsson; Savan Kotecha; Max Martin; Peter Svensson | Poo Bear; Martin | 3:35 |
| 7. | "God Given" | Brown; Carlsson; Kotecha; Svensson | Brown; Carlsson; Martin | 2:51 |
| 8. | "Warrior" | Brown; DeRoberts; Alexander Oliver | Brown; DeRoberts | 3:21 |
| 9. | "Shoofly Pie" | Tyler Greenwell; Chris Wood; Oliver Wood | Brown; DeRoberts | 3:37 |
| 10. | "Already on Fire" | Brown; Carlsson; Kotecha; Svensson | Brown; Carlsson | 2:57 |
| 11. | "Leaving Love Behind" | Brown; Bowles; Cook; Phil Hanseroth; Tim Hanseroth; Jimmy de Martini | Brown; Matt Mangano | 3:54 |
| Total length: | | | | 37:39 |

== Personnel ==
Zac Brown Band

- Zac Brown – lead vocals, acoustic and electric guitars
- Coy Bowles – electric guitar, electric slide guitar, Hammond organ
- Clay Cook – background vocals, clavinet, acoustic guitar, electric guitar, electric slide guitar, Fender Rhodes, Hammond organ, Mellotron, pedal steel guitar, piano, tambourine, Wurlitzer
- Daniel de los Reyes – percussion
- Jimmy De Martini – acoustic guitar, background vocals, banjo, cello, electric guitar, violin
- Chris Fryar – drums
- John Driskell Hopkins – background vocals, acoustic guitar, electric guitar, banjo
- Matt Mangano – acoustic and electric bass guitars, Moog bass, acoustic guitar

Additional musicians

- Brandi Carlile – vocals on "Finish What We Started”
- Colette Carlson – background vocals
- Johan Carlsson – arranger, bass guitar, clapping, drum programming, acoustic guitar, electric guitar, Hammond organ, percussion, piano, solina, synthesizer, tambourine, background vocals
- Andrew DeRoberts – acoustic guitar, drum programming, electric guitar, keyboards, synthesizer bass, background vocals, wurlitzer
- Michael Engstrom – upright bass
- Phil Hanseroth – acoustic guitar, background vocals
- Tim Hanseroth – acoustic guitar, background vocals
- Luke Laird – drum programming
- Tove Lo – background vocals
- Max Martin – background vocals
- Shawn Mendes – background vocals
- Doris Sanberg – background vocals
- Don Satchmo – Roland TR-808
- Sasha Sirota – background vocals, drum programming
- Skrillex – electric guitar, keyboards, drum programming
- Peter Svensson – nylon-string guitar
- Ryan Tedder – background vocals
- Andrew Watt – drum programming

Production

- Brandon Bell – engineer, mixing
- Cory Bice – engineer
- Michael H. Brauer – mixing
- Johan Carlsson – producer
- Alex Chapman – photography
- Clay Cook – engineer, producer
- Dan Davis – Assistant engineer, engineer
- Andrew DeRoberts – engineer, producer
- DJ Riggins – mixing assistant
- Serban Ghenea – mixing
- Chad Gibson – art direction
- John Hanes – mixing assistant
- Sam Holland – engineer
- John Driskell Hopkins – engineer
- Jaycen Joshua – mixing
- Shivani Kapoor – art direction, design
- Peter Karlsson – vocal producer
- Dave Kutch – mastering
- Paul Lamalfa – engineer
- Nicole Larson – vocal coach
- Jeremy Lertola — engineer
- Victor Lopes – photography
- Matt Mangano – engineer, producer, production coordination
- Max Martin – producer
- Michael Mechling – mixing assistant
- Happy Perez – producer
- Diego Pernia – art direction, photography
- Poo Bear – producer
- Fernando Reyes – mixing assistant
- Jacob Richards – mixing assistant
- Andy Sapp – photography
- Mike Seaburg – mixing assistant
- F. Reid Shippen — mixing
- Sasha Sirota – engineer, producer
- Skrillex – engineer, producer
- Ryan Tedder – producer
- Matt Tinsley – art direction
- Andrew Watt – producer
- Preston Tate White – assistant engineer
- Evan Wilber – assistant engineer

== Charts ==
=== Weekly charts ===
Weekly chart performance for The Owl
| Chart (2019) | Peak position |
|---|---|
| Australian Albums (ARIA) | 29 |
| Canadian Albums (Billboard) | 39 |
| Scottish Albums (OCC) | 10 |
| Swiss Albums (Schweizer Hitparade) | 69 |
| UK Albums (OCC) | 78 |
| UK Country Albums (OCC) | 2 |
| US Billboard 200 | 2 |
| US Top Country Albums (Billboard) | 1 |
| US Independent Albums (Billboard) | 1 |

=== Year-end charts ===
2019 year-end chart performance for The Owl
| Chart (2019) | Position |
|---|---|
| US Top Country Albums (Billboard) | 44 |
