= Goodbye in Her Eyes =

Single by Zac Brown Band

from the album Uncaged
- Released: October 1, 2012
- Genre: Country
- Length: 5:24 (album version); 4:42 (radio edit)
- Label: Atlantic; RPM; Southern Ground
- Songwriters: Zac Brown; Wyatt Durrette; John Driskell Hopkins; Sonia Leigh
- Producers: Zac Brown; Keith Stegall

Zac Brown Band singles chronology
"The Wind" (2012)	"Goodbye in Her Eyes" (2012)	"Jump Right In" (2013)

"Goodbye in Her Eyes" is a song recorded by American country music group Zac Brown Band. It was released in October 2012 as the second single from the group's third major-label album, Uncaged. The song was written by Zac Brown, Wyatt Durrette, John Driskell Hopkins and Sonia Leigh.

== Content ==
The song is about an impending breakup.

== Critical reception ==
Billy Dukes of Taste of Country gave the song four stars out of five, writing that "it’s a big, ambitious production that a group with less talent wouldn’t consider. It takes a few listens, but the song will hook you." Matt Bjorke of Roughstock gave the song a favorable review, calling it a "lyrically interesting, smart song" and "as smooth as a glass of aged single barrel southern bourbon."

== Music video ==
The music video was directed by Wayne Isham and premiered in November 2012.

== Chart performance ==
"Goodbye in Her Eyes" debuted at number 59 on the U.S. Billboard Hot Country Songs chart for the week of September 29, 2012. It also debuted at number 97 on the U.S. Billboard Hot 100 chart for the week of October 27, 2012. It also debuted at number 68 on the Canadian Hot 100 chart for the week of November 17, 2012. It peaked at number 1 on the US Country Airplay chart and stayed there for three weeks.

Chart (2012–2013)	Peak position
Canada Hot 100 (Billboard)	54
Canada Country (Billboard)	1
US Billboard Hot 100	48
US Hot Country Songs (Billboard)	5
US Country Airplay (Billboard)	1

=== Year-end charts ===
Chart (2012)	Position
US Hot Country Songs (Billboard)	88

Chart (2013)	Position
US Country Airplay (Billboard)	55
US Hot Country Songs (Billboard)	56

== Certifications ==
Region	Certification	Certified units/sales
United States (RIAA)	Platinum	1,000,000^{‡}
^{‡} Sales+streaming figures based on certification alone.
