= Sweet Annie =

Single by Zac Brown Band

from the album Uncaged
- Released: August 26, 2013
- Genre: Country
- Length: 4:38
- Label: Atlantic; Southern Ground
- Songwriters: Zac Brown; Wyatt Durrette; Sonia Leigh; John Pierce
- Producers: Zac Brown; Keith Stegall

Zac Brown Band singles chronology
"Jump Right In" (2013)	"Sweet Annie" (2013)	"All Alright" (2014)

Music video
- "Sweet Annie (Official Video)" on YouTube

"Sweet Annie" is a song recorded by American country music group Zac Brown Band. It was released in August 2013 as the fourth single from the group's third major-label album, Uncaged. The song was written by Zac Brown, Wyatt Durrette, Sonia Leigh, and John Pierce. As of March 12, 2014 the single has sold 439,000 copies in the United States and has been certified Gold by the RIAA.

== Content ==
The song is a mid-tempo ballad about a singer who is tired of his life on the road, and pleads with his lover to "stay with [him] awhile." It is in the key of F-sharp major with a slow tempo of 72 beats per minute, and the guitars set to E-flat tuning.

== Critical reception ==
Chuck Dauphin of Roughstock gave the song a favorable review, praising the "spellbinding" harmonies and calling it "another hit to be from arguably the most consistent act in the business." On the same site, Bobby Peacock gave it 5 out of 5 stars, saying that it had "a familiar but enjoyable story" and that "The instrumental interplay is as strong as ever […] And of course, there's absolutely no denying those impeccable four-part harmonies." Phyllis Hunter of Got Country Online gave the song five out of five stars as well, calling it "simple and heartbreaking. Not since "Colder Weather" has Zac Brown's voice been so achingly showcased." Billy Dukes of Taste of Country was less favorable, giving the song three and a half stars out of five and writing that "the collaborative spirit that defined them early on is missing, making the ensemble sound more like Zac Brown's band instead of the Zac Brown Band." Dukes also called the song "predictable," saying that "the lyrical strength of 'Sweet Annie' will serve the song well, but one finds himself begging for a surprise."

== Music video ==
The music video was directed by Cole Cassell and premiered in October 2013. It featured an edited video of Coy Bowles' wedding, who is a member of the band.

== Chart performance ==
"Sweet Annie" debuted at number 58 on the U.S. Billboard Country Airplay chart for the week of August 31, 2013. It also debuted at number 50 on the U.S. Billboard Hot Country Songs chart for the week of September 21, 2013. It also debuted at number 94 on the U.S. Billboard Hot 100 chart for the week of November 2, 2013. It also debuted at number 96 on the Canadian Hot 100 chart for the week of November 9, 2013. As of March 2014, the song has sold 439,000 copies in the U.S.

Chart (2013–2014)	Peak position
Canada Hot 100 (Billboard)	47
Canada Country (Billboard)	2
US Billboard Hot 100	47
US Country Airplay (Billboard)	1
US Hot Country Songs (Billboard)	6

=== Year-end charts ===
Chart (2013)	Position
US Country Airplay (Billboard)	77
US Hot Country Songs (Billboard)	92

Chart (2014)	Position
US Country Airplay (Billboard)	57
US Hot Country Songs (Billboard)	56

== Certifications ==
Region	Certification	Certified units/sales
United States (RIAA)	Gold	500,000^{‡}
^{‡} Sales+streaming figures based on certification alone.
