= Out in the Middle =

Single by Zac Brown Band

from the album The Comeback
- B-side: "Old Love Song"
- Released: January 24, 2022
- Genre: Country
- Length: 2:46
- Label: Home Grown/Warner Music Nashville
- Songwriters: Zac Brown; Ben Simonetti; Jonathan Singleton; Luke Combs
- Producers: Zac Brown; Ben Simonetti

Zac Brown Band singles chronology
"Same Boat" (2021)	"Out in the Middle" (2022)	"Tie Up" (2024)

"Out in the Middle" is a song by American country music group Zac Brown Band. It was released on January 24, 2022 as the second single from their seventh atudio album The Comeback. Lead singer Zac Brown wrote the song with Ben Simonetti, Jonathan Singleton, and Luke Combs. The band, including new full-time member Caroline Jones, performed the song live at the 56th Annual Country Music Association Awards with Marcus King.

== Content ==
Carena Liptak of Taste of Country described the song as similar to the band's earlier works and a "made for the stage roots anthem". Zac Brown, lead singer of Zac Brown Band, wrote the song with Ben Simonetti, Jonathan Singleton, and Luke Combs. Brown told Taste of Country that the song had "Southern rock storytelling" and that "It's a tip of the hat to the people who live out in the middle of nowhere and they're happy being there".

In June 2022, the band re-released The Comeback with a bonus remix of the song featuring guest vocals from Blake Shelton.

The song also received a music video, released in March 2022. Ryan McLemore directed the video and filmed it in Leesville, South Carolina.

== Chart performance ==
=== Weekly charts ===
Weekly chart performance for "Out in the Middle"
Chart (2022–2023)	Peak position
Canada Country (Billboard)	31
US Billboard Hot 100	86
US Country Airplay (Billboard)	12
US Hot Country Songs (Billboard)	22

=== Year-end charts ===
2022 year-end chart performance for "Out in the Middle"
Chart (2022)	Position
US Country Airplay (Billboard)	51
US Hot Country Songs (Billboard)	75

2023 year-end chart performance for "Out in the Middle"
Chart (2023)	Position
US Hot Country Songs (Billboard)	99

== Certifications ==
Certifications for "Out in the Middle"
Region	Certification	Certified units/sales
United States (RIAA)	Gold	500,000^{‡}
^{‡} Sales+streaming figures based on certification alone.
