= Levi Lowrey =

American singer-songwriter

- Origin: Dacula, Georgia
- Genres: Singer-songwriter
- Years active: 1990–present
- Label: Southern Ground Artists
- Website: http://www.levilowrey.com

Levi Lowrey is a singer-songwriter from Dacula, Georgia. He has performed extensively as a solo artist, headliner, and as the supporting act for well known names including Clay Cook, and Zac Brown Band. He is a great-grandson of Gid Tanner. Lowrey is one of the co-writers of the 'Colder Weather' performed by Zac Brown Band that went #1 for two weeks. Lowrey is also the co- writer of Zac Brown Band single 'The Wind" from their #1 Billboard album Uncaged. He is a CMA nominee for "Colder Weather" 2012 BMI Country Award Winner Top 50 songs of the year Colder Weather. 2011 and 2012 voted Best Local Songwriter- Creative Loafing. Roughstock named Levi 13 of 13: Ones to watch in 2013.

Lowrey has performed on many Zac Brown Band projects including the live album, "Pass the Jar: Zac Brown Band and Friends Live from the Fabulous Fox Theatre In Atlanta", the exclusive compilation, "Breaking Southern Ground", and Zac Brown Band's "You Get What You Give".

== Discography ==
=== Full-Lengths ===
Year	Tracks	Title
2008	10	I've Held The Devil's Hand
2011	12	I Confess I Was A Fool
2014	15	Levi Lowrey
2015	10	My Crazy Head
2016	21	Roots & Branches
2023	12	Another Way

=== Double Albums ===
Roots & Branches, 2016

=== Live albums ===
"Live at the Red Clay Music Foundry," 2017

=== Guest appearances ===
Year	Title	Director
2011	"Back Down South" (Kings of Leon)	Casey McGrath

== Album appearances ==
Year	Title	Artist	Album	Contribution
2009	"Mountain Time"	Clay Cook	Mountain Time	Fiddle, Backing Vocals
2010	"I Shall Be Released"	Zac Brown Band	Pass the Jar	Vocals
2011	"Ribbon of Red"	Sonia Leigh	1978 December	Vocals
2011	"Bar"	Sonia Leigh	1978 December	Vocals
2011	"Fix the System"	Nathanial McGill	An Inconvenient Tax (Motion Picrtue Soundtrack)	Fiddle
2012	"How Could I?"	John Driskell Hopkins	Daylight	Vocals
2012	"Lest We Forget"	The Brothers Bright	A Song Treasury	Fiddle
2012	"Prison Bible"	Fester Hagood	Live from Rock Bottom	Fiddle, Engineering & Production
2018	"Top of The Stairs"	Mike Rizzi	Appropriate What Remains	Vocals

== Co-wrote songs ==
Year	Title	Recording Artist	Album	Co-writer(s)
2010	"Colder Weather"	Zac Brown Band	You Get What You Give	Zac Brown, Wyatt Durrette, Coy Bowles
2012	"How Could I"	John Driskell Hopkins (ft. Levi Lowrey)	Daylight	Hopkins
2012	"The Wind"	Zac Brown Band	Uncaged	Zac Brown, Wyatt Durrette
2013	"Good Country People"	Travis Meadows	Old Ghosts and Unfinished Business	Meadows
