= Toes (Zac Brown Band song) =

Single by Zac Brown Band

from the album The Foundation
- Released: July 6, 2009
- Genre: Country
- Length: 4:21 (Album Version); 3:53 (Single Edit)
- Label: Atlantic/Home Grown/Big Picture
- Songwriters: Zac Brown; Wyatt Durrette; John Driskell Hopkins; Shawn Mullins
- Producers: Zac Brown; Keith Stegall

Zac Brown Band singles chronology
"Whatever It Is" (2009)	"Toes" (2009)	"Highway 20 Ride" (2009)

Music video
- "Toes" on YouTube

"Toes" is a song recorded by the Zac Brown Band, an American country music band. Lead singer Zac Brown and bass guitarist John Driskell Hopkins co-wrote the song with Shawn Mullins and Wyatt Durrette. It was released in July 2009 as the third single from the band's 2008 major-label debut studio album The Foundation. The song became their second number one hit and their third Top 10 on the U.S. Billboard Hot Country Songs chart in November 2009.

== Content ==
Zac Brown wrote this song with Wyatt Durette (with whom he co-wrote the band's first two singles, "Chicken Fried" and "Whatever It Is") along with the band's bass guitarist John Driskell Hopkins and musician Shawn Mullins. According to Brown, Durette phoned him at six o'clock one morning during his 30th birthday vacation in Key West, and provided him with the idea for the song.

In the song, the male narrator describes a relaxing trip to Mexico from Georgia, or "G-A." Throughout the verses, he tells of the "pretty señoritas" and "muchachas" that he encounters, as well as the copious alcoholic drinks that he consumes. In the final pre-chorus, the narrator runs out of money, returns home and continues to relax there.

== Edits ==
The version released to most radio stations replaces the line "I got my toes in the water, ass in the sand" from the chorus with "[…]toes in the sand" and edits out the line "roll a big fat one" from a later chorus. These edits were met with different responses from those involved with the creation of the song. Durette said, "If people like the song, they are going to buy it and they end up with the real version. So while it’s not the greatest, it’s not the end of the world either," while Brown said that he would rather have the song not played at all than have an edited version played.

== Music video ==
According to Brown, the song's music video includes a central character named "Flody Boatwood" and several cameo appearances, including Kid Rock. The video was directed by Darren Doane, and released July 7, 2009. Portions of the music video were shot at Daniel's Grocery off of Pilgrim Mill Road in Forsyth County, Georgia, and on Lake Lanier.

== Critical reception ==
The song has been met with positive critical reception, usually with comparisons to the musical styles of Jimmy Buffett. Mark Deming, in his Allmusic review of the album, compared "Toes" and "Where the Boat Leaves From" to Buffett's material, saying that both songs were "devoted to the joys of getting buzzed and playing music in some seaside locale with good weather." Pierce Greenberg of Engine 145 also compared it to "Where the Boat Leaves From," saying that "Toes" had a "more refreshing look at the same 'let’s get away to the beach' theme" and "one fiesta of a chorus." On the same site, Sam Gazdziak gave the song a thumbs-up, saying that it had "[a] more realistic scenario" in comparison to Kenny Chesney's Buffett-influenced songs. Billboard critic Ken Tucker said that it was a "tropical treat" in Buffett's tradition, and Bobby Peacock of Roughstock said that it "may just be one of the best summer songs to hit country radio in quite some time."

== Commercial success ==
Toes became the band's third (consecutive) single to reach the Top 5 on U.S. Billboard Hot Country Songs chart and their second to reach number one. The song also became the band's third consecutive single to peak in the Top 30 on the Billboard Hot 100. The single was certified Platinum by the RIAA on February 22, 2010, and by May 2015, sales had reached over 3 million copies in the United States. As of July 2015, the song has sold 3,024,000 copies in the U.S.

== Charts and certifications ==
=== Weekly charts ===
Chart (2009)	Peak position
Canada Country (Billboard)	3
Canada Hot 100 (Billboard)	60
US Billboard Hot 100	25
US Hot Country Songs (Billboard)	1

=== Year-end charts ===
Chart (2009)	Position
US Country Songs (Billboard)	29

=== Certifications ===
Region	Certification	Certified units/sales
Canada (Music Canada)	Gold	40,000^{*}
United States (RIAA)	3× Platinum	3,024,000
^{*} Sales figures based on certification alone.
