= Free (Zac Brown Band song) =

Single by Zac Brown Band

from the album The Foundation
- Released: April 12, 2010
- Genre: Country
- Length: 3:48
- Label: Southern Ground; Atlantic Nashville
- Songwriter: Zac Brown
- Producers: Zac Brown; Keith Stegall

Zac Brown Band singles chronology
"We Are the World 25 for Haiti" (2010)	"Free" (2010)	"This Song's for You" (2010)

"Free" is a song recorded by American country music group Zac Brown Band for their 2008 album The Foundation. On April 12, 2010, it was released as the fifth and final single from the album. It debuted on the Billboard Hot Country Songs charts at number 54 for the week of May 1, 2010. The song was nominated for the Best Country Performance by a Duo or Group with Vocal and the Best Country Song at the 53rd Annual Grammy Awards.

== Music video ==
A live performance music video was released to CMT in May 2010. The performance was taken from the band's Pass The Jar DVD, and features a guest appearance by Joey + Rory. A video for the studio version was released on May 28, 2010. Both videos were directed by Darren Doane. An alternate music video was released as a tribute to the United States military fighting in the Middle East. The video contains video of Zac Brown Band visiting troops on their USO tour, socializing with the troops, and performing a concert for the troops. The song itself is heard as a soundtrack to the video. The concert in the video, given by Zac Brown Band, is never heard, just depicted.

== Critical reception ==
Kyle Ward of Roughstock gave the song a 4/5, saying that, although the song "get[s] a bit too repetitious," said the song's "acoustic arrangements d[id] a great job to highlight [Zac] Brown's voice on the verses." Mark Deming of Allmusic, in his review of the album, stated that the song, as well as "Highway 20 Ride," "show the influence of the more sentimental branches of the Texas singer-songwriter tradition."

== Use in media ==
The song was used in a 2010 Busch commercial featuring the band.

== Chart performance ==
"Free" is the fourth single from the band's debut album to reach Number One on the Hot Country Songs charts, having peaked on the chart dated for the week ending August 21, 2010. Its peak makes Zac Brown Band the first country music act to have four Number One singles from a debut album since Brooks & Dunn's Brand New Man produced four Number Ones between 1991 and 1992.

Chart (2010)	Peak position
Canada Country (Billboard)	4
Canada Hot 100 (Billboard)	59
US Billboard Hot 100	34
US Adult Pop Airplay (Billboard)	37
US Hot Country Songs (Billboard)	1

=== Year-end charts ===
Chart (2010)	Position
US Country Songs (Billboard)	36

== Certifications ==
Region	Certification	Certified units/sales
United States (RIAA)	Platinum	1,000,000^{‡}
^{‡} Sales+streaming figures based on certification alone.
