= Chicken Fried =

- "Chicken Fried" cover

Single by Zac Brown Band

from the album The Foundation
- Released: June 16, 2008
- Genre: Country
- Length: 3:58 (album version); 3:38 (radio edit)
- Label: Live Nation; Home Grown; Atlantic
- Songwriters: Zac Brown; Wyatt Durrette
- Producers: Zac Brown; Keith Stegall

Zac Brown Band singles chronology
"Chicken Fried" (2008)	"Whatever It Is" (2009)

Music video
- "Chicken Fried" on YouTube

"Chicken Fried" is a song by American country music group Zac Brown Band, which frontman Zac Brown co-wrote with Wyatt Durrette. The song was first recorded in 2003 for the 2005 album Home Grown. The Lost Trailers, another country group, released their version in 2006 as a single, but it was withdrawn from radio. Two years later, the Zac Brown Band re-recorded the song and released it as the first single from their album The Foundation.

In late 2008, "Chicken Fried" became the band's first chart single, as well as their first number-one hit on the Billboard country charts. The song has also been placed at number 39 for the Taste of Country's "Top 100 Country Songs of All Time" chart. The song was featured in the 2008 comedy film Witless Protection.

== History ==
Brown began co-writing "Chicken Fried" with Wyatt Durrette several years before the song's release. The two met when Brown was playing at a tavern in Atlanta, Georgia. According to Country Weekly magazine, Brown had already started the song, when he and Durrette began listing off "things that are very southern or characteristic of the South to put into this song." The song was completed gradually over several years. Following the September 11 attacks, Brown decided to add the third verse, which has a patriotic theme ("I thank God for my life / For the stars and stripes…"). Although he had already begun performing the song, he still considered it unfinished until he added a line to the second verse. The patriotic theme and Southern cuisine was the band's inspiration to record this song.

The Zac Brown Band first recorded "Chicken Fried" in 2003 and later included this version on their self-released 2005 album Home Grown. Later on, in 2006, The Lost Trailers covered the song as their first release for the BNA Records label, with Blake Chancey serving as producer. Although The Lost Trailers' version had entered the country charts, it was soon withdrawn from radio and replaced with "Call Me Crazy", as Brown had changed his mind about licensing the song to BNA. "Call Me Crazy" then went on to peak at 43 in mid-2006. In the Nashville episode of Sonic Highways, Zac Brown explained the situation in greater detail:

We had this song Chicken Fried, we put it on a CD in '05. This band, The Lost Trailers had called and said "We want to record Chicken Fried." I was like "Well, I don't have a problem with you recording the song, but this is our song. As long as you don't release it to radio, if you want to have it on your record, I'm fine with that." Then they get a record deal through Sony with this dude Joe Galante, who like, runs Nashville, basically. He said "THAT'S the single." So The first time I hear "Chicken Fried" on the radio, it wasn't us singing it. It was like, my worst nightmare. So I call my lawyer and was like "Dude, the fucking song is on the radio," and then he says ya know, "Zac, what's the deal with this?" He's like, "You could get blackballed out of Nashville forever for not letting them record the song." I was like, ya know "Fuck that, the dude told me he wouldn't fucking do it, and then he did it!" So they had to call a cease-and-desist, they pulled it off the radio. I came to Nashville to play a show at 3rd and Lindsley and there was a dude in there, they were like "You know who that is? That's the dude that's had 40 Number 1's with Alan Jackson and he's like the dude, Keith Stegall. Keith had come out to hear me play. He sat down at the table, and he's like, ya know staring down at his drink and he said "I had to meet the kid that told Joe Galante to fuck off." And that was the beginning (of our relationship and commercial success).

— Zac Brown

In 2008, the Zac Brown Band re-recorded "Chicken Fried" for their fourth album, The Foundation, which Keith Stegall produced. This re-recording was then released in mid-2008 as the band's first single, reaching number one on the country charts in late 2008.

In 2009, Alan Jackson revealed that he was planning to record the song shortly before the Zac Brown Band version was released, but declined because he felt that he had too many other songs that mentioned food.

On some radio stations, the lyric "Turn the radio up" was changed to say the station name or branding instead. Examples includes KNCI in Sacramento, where the lyric was changed to "KNCI up", and stations branded as The Bull, where the lyric was changed to "Turn The Bull on up".

== Commercial performance ==
The Lost Trailers' version of the song reached as high as #52 on the Hot Country Songs chart in 2006 before being withdrawn as a single. The Zac Brown Band's version made its debut at #59 on the same chart for the week of June 28, 2008, peaking at #1 on the chart week of December 6. This song also made the Zac Brown Band the first country music group to reach number one with a debut single since Heartland's 2006 number one hit "I Loved Her First". The song reached 4 million in sales in the United States by October 2013. As of July 2017, the song has sold 4,913,000 copies in the United States.

An Applebee's TV advertisement featuring the song was aired on CNN while covering Russia’s invasion of Ukraine the night of February 24, 2022, causing controversy. Applebee's eventually pulled its advertising from CNN in response to the incident. This incident was criticized by John Oliver on Last Week Tonight, which was followed up with a montage of news reports covering historic events, such as the killing of Osama bin Laden, the assassination of John F. Kennedy, and the verdict in the O. J. Simpson murder trial, being interrupted by the same Applebee's TV advertisement.

== Charts and certifications ==
=== Zac Brown Band's version ===
==== Weekly chart ====
Chart (2008–2009)	Peak position
Canada Country (Billboard)	10
Canada Hot 100 (Billboard)	52
US Billboard Hot 100	20
US Hot Country Songs (Billboard)	1

==== Year-end charts ====
Chart (2008)	Position
US Country Songs (Billboard)	49
Chart (2009)	Set
US Billboard Hot 100	81
US Country Songs (Billboard)	60

==== Sales and certifications ====
Region	Certification	Certified units/sales
Canada (Music Canada)	Gold	40,000^{*}
New Zealand (RMNZ)	4× Platinum	120,000^{‡}
United Kingdom (BPI)	Gold	400,000^{‡}
United States (RIAA) Digital	9× Platinum	9,000,000^{‡}
United States (RIAA) Mastertone	Gold	500,000^{*}
^{*} Sales figures based on certification alone.^{‡} Sales+streaming figures based on certification alone.

=== The Lost Trailers version ===
Chart (2006)	Peak position
US Hot Country Songs (Billboard)	52
