= Highway 20 Ride =

Single by Zac Brown Band

from the album The Foundation
- Released: November 23, 2009
- Genre: Country
- Length: 3:49
- Label: Atlantic/Home Grown/Bigger Picture Music Group
- Songwriters: Zac Brown; Wyatt Durrette
- Producers: Zac Brown; Keith Stegall

Zac Brown Band singles chronology
"Toes" (2009)	"Highway 20 Ride" (2009)	"We Are the World 25 for Haiti" (2010)

Music video
- "Highway 20 Ride" on YouTube

"Highway 20 Ride" is a song recorded by American country music group Zac Brown Band, written by lead singer Zac Brown and Wyatt Durrette. The song was released in November 2009 as the fourth single from the band's 2008 album The Foundation. It is the band's third Number One on the U.S. country singles chart.

== History ==
Wyatt Durette was inspired to write "Highway 20 Ride" while driving along Interstate 20 between Atlanta, Georgia and the Georgia/South Carolina state line in Augusta, Georgia to drop off his son, Wyatt IV, so that his mother could pick him up. Durette told Country Weekly magazine that, during one such trip, he began to think about "how [Wyatt IV] would perceive [him] as a father." After he showed some of his lyrics to Zac Brown, Brown helped Durette finish the song.

== Music video ==
The music video was directed by Darren Doane and was released on December 22, 2009.

== Critical reception ==
The song received many positive reviews. Matt Bjorke of Roughstock stated that it "give[s] country music their 'new Alabama.'" Leeann Ward of Country Universe gave the song an A, referring to it as "touching and tastefully constructed" and saying that it "may turn out to be one of the best singles of 2009." Mark Deming of Allmusic, in his review of the album, stated that the song, as well as "Free," "show the influence of the more sentimental branches of the Texas singer-songwriter tradition." Pierce Greenberg of Engine 145, in his review of the album, referred to the song as a "geographical heartbreak song." Jessica Phillips of Country Weekly magazine gave it four stars out of five, with her review calling it "honest, not syrupy" and describing Brown's "powerful vocals" as a standout.

== Chart performance ==
On the week ending December 19, 2009, the song became Zac Brown Band's fourth consecutive Top 40 hit on the Billboard Hot Country Songs charts. It debuted on the Hot 100 at #98 on the week ending January 30, 2010. It has since reached #40, becoming their fourth consecutive Top 40 on the Billboard Hot 100. In April 2010, the song became Zac Brown Band's third Number One single on the Hot Country Songs chart. The song reached over a million copies in the US in April 2014, and as of February 2015, it has sold 1,058,000 copies.

Chart (2009–2010)	Peak position
Canada Country (Billboard)	3
Canada Hot 100 (Billboard)	66
US Billboard Hot 100	40
US Hot Country Songs (Billboard)	1

=== Year-end charts ===
Chart (2010)	Position
US Country Songs (Billboard)	14

== Certifications ==
Region	Certification	Certified units/sales
United States (RIAA)	Platinum	1,000,000^{‡}
^{‡} Sales+streaming figures based on certification alone.
