= Whatever It Is =

Single by Zac Brown Band

from the album The Foundation
- Released: January 19, 2009
- Genre: Country
- Length: 3:29
- Label: Atlantic/Home Grown/Big Picture
- Songwriters: Zac Brown; Wyatt Durrette
- Producers: Zac Brown; Keith Stegall

Zac Brown Band singles chronology
"Chicken Fried" (2008)	"Whatever It Is" (2009)	"Toes" (2009)

Music video
- "Whatever It Is" on YouTube

"Whatever It Is" a song recorded by Zac Brown Band, an American country music group. It is the second single release from the 2008 album The Foundation and the band's second Top 3 hit on the Billboard country singles charts. The song is the follow-up to the band's number-one debut single "Chicken Fried".

== Content ==
"Whatever It Is" was co-written by Zac Brown and Wyatt Durrette, with whom Brown also co-wrote the band's debut single "Chicken Fried". In it, the male narrator expresses his love for his female partner by saying that "she's got whatever it is". He also says that whenever he tries to express his feelings for her, "it comes out 'I love you'".

== Music video ==
The video features Canadian and American actress Emmanuelle Chriqui.

== Critical reception ==
Although he said that it was his "second least-favorite" song on the album, Dan Milliken of Country Universe gave "Whatever It Is" a B− rating. He said that the song sounded "mostly genuine" but at the same time, "too nice to be completely memorable" because it lacked a sense of urgency. Ken Tucker gave a favorable review in Billboard, saying that the song "is a love song, pure and simple, meshing a traditional fiddle-laden sound and modern country harmonies, as lead singer Brown at times channels James Taylor".

== Use In Media ==
- The song was used on Local On The 8s in February to May 2013 on The Weather Channel.

== Charts ==
"Whatever It Is" debuted at No. 54 on the Hot Country Songs chart for the chart week of January 24, 2009. It peaked at No. 2 on the charts. On the Billboard Year-End chart, "Whatever It Is" ranked at No. 2 as well.

Chart (2009)	Peak position
Canada Country (Billboard)	7
Canada Hot 100 (Billboard)	72
US Billboard Hot 100	26
US Hot Country Songs (Billboard)	2

=== Year-end charts ===
Chart (2009)	Position
US Billboard Hot 100	94
US Country Songs (Billboard)	2

== Certifications ==
Region	Certification	Certified units/sales
United States (RIAA)	2× Platinum	2,000,000^{‡}
^{‡} Sales+streaming figures based on certification alone.
