= Sonia Leigh =

American country music singer-songwriter (born 1978)

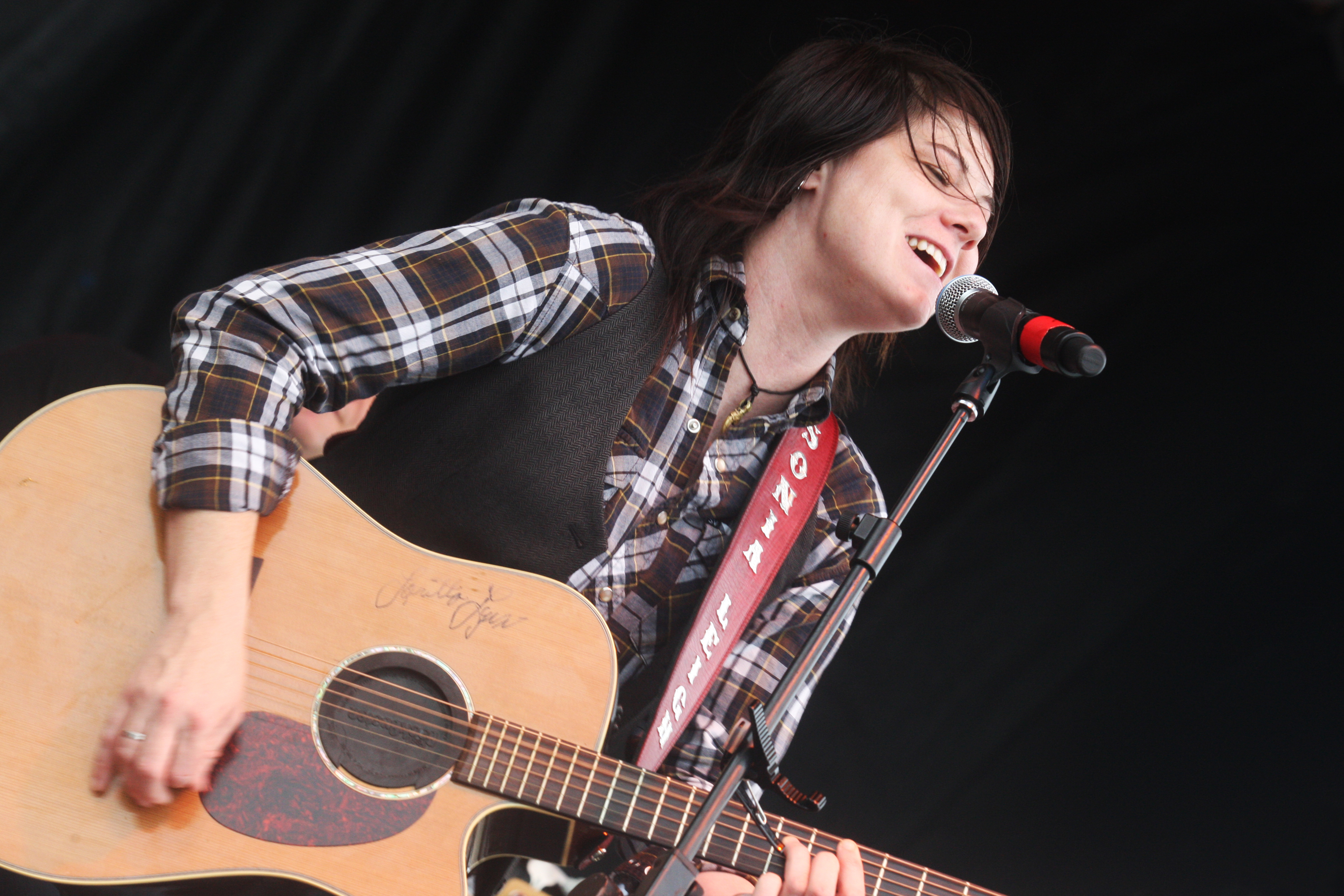
- Sonia Leigh at the North Carolina Country Music Freedom Festival in 2011

Background information
- Born: December 1978
- Origin: Molena, Georgia
- Genres: Country, Americana
- Occupation: Singer-songwriter
- Years active: 1998 – present
- Label: Southern Ground Artists
- Website: http://www.sonialeigh.com

Sonia Leigh (born December 1978) is an American country music singer-songwriter. Following her 1998 debut, Remember Me, Leigh has performed extensively as a solo artist, headliner, and as the supporting act for Jason Mraz, The Marshall Tucker Band, Zac Brown Band, and Blackberry Smoke.

Her 2007 release Run or Surrender was produced by John Hopkins of the Zac Brown Band. Her Southern Ground debut album, 1978 December, was released on September 27, 2011. The first single off the album is "My Name Is Money," which Juli Thanki of Engine 145 gave a "thumbs up". Leigh also co-wrote the Zac Brown Band singles "Goodbye in Her Eyes" and "Sweet Annie".

== Discography ==
=== Albums ===
Title	Album details	Peak chart positions	
Title	Album details	US Country	US Heat
Remember Me	Release date: 1998; Label: self-released	—	—
Laundry	Release date: April 11, 2000; Label: Zonolite	—	—
Run or Surrender	Release date: 2007; Label: self-released	—	—
1978 December	Release date: September 27, 2011; Label: Southern Ground	43	15
Counting Skeletons	Release date: June 3, 2014; Label: Independent		
Mad Hatter	Release date: January 12, 2018; Label: Willing To Fly Music		
"—" denotes releases that did not chart

=== Live albums ===
Title	Album details
Angel on My Shoulder	Release date: September 16, 2008; Label: self-released

=== Singles ===
Year	Single	Peak positions	Album
Year	Single	US Country	Album
2011	"My Name Is Money"	45	1978 December
2012	"Bar"	—	1978 December
2014	"Put It in Your Pocket"	—	—N/a
2014	"When We Are Alone"	—	—N/a
2015	"Booty Call"	—	—N/a
"—" denotes releases that did not chart

=== Music videos ===
Year	Video	Director
2011	"My Name Is Money"	Chris Hicky
2012	"Bar" (barroom radio mix)	Cole Cassell
2015	"When We Are Alone"	Alden Allen
