= Wyatt Durrette (songwriter) =

American songwriter

- Born: Wyatt Beazley Durrette III; May 2, 1974 (age 52)
- Origin: Richmond, Virginia, United States
- Occupation: Songwriter
- Years active: 2006–present

Wyatt Beazley Durrette III is an American country music songwriter. He is known mainly as a collaborator of the Zac Brown Band, for whom he has written many of their singles.

== Biography ==
Durrette was born in Virginia but moved to Atlanta, Georgia. His father was attorney and politician Wyatt Durrette. He wrote his first song at age eleven, and was inspired to pursue songwriting after being brought to a Jimmy Buffett concert by his sister, Dawn. Durrette briefly lived in Byron Center Michigan after his father took a job at the local school. After graduating college, Durrette worked as a bartender and manager of a bar in Atlanta, Georgia, where he met Zac Brown of the Zac Brown Band. He began writing songs with the band, and the two began writing songs together. Durrette is the co-writer of many of Zac Brown Band's singles, including their breakthrough "Chicken Fried".

Durrette also co-wrote Luke Combs' 2019 singles "Beautiful Crazy" and "Even Though I'm Leaving".

Durrette’s songs have a combined 1.5 billion digital streams, and 13 Number Ones and 16 Number Ones at Country & Rock Radio.

== Awards ==
- Chicken Fried - BMI "#1 Award"
- Homegrown - SESAC "Song of the Year"
- Uncaged – GRAMMY - "Best Country Album" (Zac Brown Band)
- Jump Right In – GRAMMY - "Best Country Album" (Zac Brown Band)
- Goodbye in Her Eyes – GRAMMY - "Best Country Album" (Zac Brown Band)
- The Wind – GRAMMY - "Best Country Album" (Zac Brown Band)
- Sweet Annie – GRAMMY - "Best Country Album" (Zac Brown Band)
- Natural Disaster – GRAMMY - "Best Country Album" (Zac Brown Band)
- Day That I Die (feat. Amos Lee) – GRAMMY - "Best Country Album" (Zac Brown Band)
- Last But Not Least – GRAMMY -"Best Country Album" (Zac Brown Band)
- Heavy is the Head (feat. Chris Cornell) - People’s Choice Awards "Rock Song of the Year"
- Homegrown - Nashville Songwriter’s Association "#1 Award"
- Homegrown - People’s Choice Awards "Country Song of the Year"
- Chicken Fried - CMA "Triple Play Award"
- Whatever It Is - CMA "Triple Play Award"
- Toes - CMA "Triple Play Award"
- Highway 20 Ride - CMA "Triple Play Award"
- As She’s Walking Away - CMA "Triple Play Award"
- Colder Weather - CMA "Triple Play Award"

== Accolades ==
- Chicken Fried - CMA Awards "Single of the Year"
- Chicken Fried - CMA Awards "Song of the Year"
- Toes - ACM Awards "Album of the Year" (Zac Brown Band)
- Whatever It Is - ACM Awards "Album of the Year" (ZBB)
- Where The Boat Leaves From - ACM Awards "Album of the Year" (ZBB)
- Chicken Fried - ACM Awards "Album of the Year" (ZBB)
- Different Kind of Fine - ACM Awards "Album of the Year" (ZBB)
- Highway 20 Ride - ACM Awards "Album of the Year" (ZBB)
- Toes - ACM Awards "Single Record of the Year"
- Toes - GRAMMY "Best Country Album" (ZBB)
- Whatever It Is - GRAMMY "Best Country Album" (ZBB)
- Where The Boat Leaves From - GRAMMY "Best Country Album" (ZBB)
- Chicken Fried - GRAMMY "Best Country Album" (ZBB)
- Different Kind of Fine - GRAMMY "Best Country Album" (ZBB)
- Highway 20 Ride - GRAMMY "Best Country Album" (ZBB)
- As She’s Walking Away (feat. Alan Jackson) - ACM Awards "Single of the Year"
- As She’s Walking Away (feat. Alan Jackson) - ACM Awards "Song of the Year"
- Let It Go - ACM Awards "Album of the Year" (ZBB)
- Knee Deep (feat. Jimmy Buffett) - ACM Awards "Album of the Year" (ZBB)
- No Hurry - ACM Awards "Album of the Year" (ZBB)
- I Play the Road - ACM Awards "Album of the Year" (ZBB)
- Whiskey’s Gone - ACM Awards "Album of the Year" (ZBB)
- Quiet Your Mind - ACM Awards "Album of the Year" (ZBB)
- Colder Weather - ACM Awards "Album of the Year" (ZBB)
- Settle Me Down - ACM Awards "Album of the Year" (ZBB)
- As She’s Walking Away (feat. Alan Jackson) - ACM Awards "Album of the Year" (ZBB)
- Keep Me in Mind - ACM Awards "Album of the Year" (ZBB)
- Make This Day - ACM Awards "Album of the Year" (ZBB)
- Colder Weather - CMA Awards "Single of the Year"
- Colder Weather - CMA Awards "Song of the Year"
- Let It Go - CMA Awards "Album of the Year" (ZBB)
- Knee Deep (feat. Jimmy Buffett) - CMA Awards "Album of the Year" (ZBB)
- No Hurry - CMA Awards "Album of the Year" (ZBB)
- I Play the Road - CMA Awards "Album of the Year" (ZBB)
- Whiskey’s Gone - CMA Awards "Album of the Year" (ZBB)
- Quiet Your Mind - CMA Awards "Album of the Year" (ZBB)
- Colder Weather - CMA Awards "Album of the Year" (ZBB)
- Settle Me Down - CMA Awards "Album of the Year" (ZBB)
- As She’s Walking Away (feat. Alan Jackson) - CMA Awards "Album of the Year" (ZBB)
- Keep Me in Mind - CMA Awards "Album of the Year" (ZBB)
- Make This Day - CMA Awards "Album of the Year" (ZBB)
- Let It Go - ACM Awards "Album of the Year" (ZBB)
- Knee Deep (feat. Jimmy Buffett) - ACM Awards "Album of the Year" (ZBB)
- No Hurry - ACM Awards "Album of the Year" (ZBB)
- I Play the Road - ACM Awards "Album of the Year" (ZBB)
- Whiskey’s Gone - ACM Awards "Album of the Year" (ZBB)
- Quiet Your Mind - ACM Awards "Album of the Year" (ZBB)
- Colder Weather - ACM Awards "Album of the Year" (ZBB)
- Settle Me Down - ACM Awards "Album of the Year" (ZBB)
- As She’s Walking Away - ACM Awards "Album of the Year" (ZBB)
- Keep Me in Mind - ACM Awards "Album of the Year" (ZBB)
- Make This Day - ACM Awards "Album of the Year" (ZBB)
- As She’s Walking Away (feat. Alan Jackson) - ACM Awards "Single of the Year"
- As She’s Walking Away (feat. Alan Jackson) - ACM Awards "Single by a Duo/Group"
- As She’s Walking Away (feat. Alan Jackson) - ACM Awards "Single by a Vocal Collaboration"
- Knee Deep feat. Jimmy Buffett - ACM Awards "Single by a Vocal Collaboration"
- Where the River Goes (Footloose Soundtrack 2011) - GRAMMY nomination "Best Song Written for Motion Picture"
