= Blake Shelton discography =

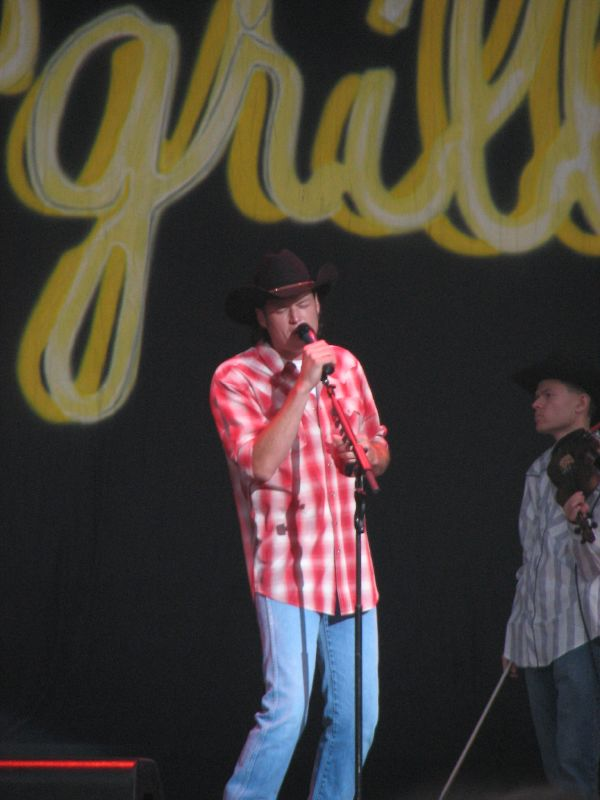
- Shelton performing at the Crawford County Fair, Meadville, Pennsylvania, in August 2005
- Studio albums: 13
- Extended plays: 5
- Compilation albums: 5
- Singles: 57
- Music videos: 44

American country music singer Blake Shelton has released 13 studio albums, four extended plays, five compilation albums, and 54 singles (including five as a featured artist). According to Recording Industry Association of America, Shelton has sold 52 million singles and 13 million albums in the United States. He also has achieved 29 number-one hits on the Billboard Country Airplay chart and 14 No. 1 hits on Billboard's Hot Country Songs chart. Billboard ranked him as the 31st Top Artist of the 2010s decade.

His debut single "Austin" was issued via Giant Records, but that label closed soon afterward and Warner Bros. Records Nashville assumed promotion of the single. All of Shelton's subsequent releases have also been on Warner Bros. Nashville, except for a temporary shift to Reprise Records Nashville in 2009 and 2010. "Austin" topped the Billboard Hot Country Songs charts in 2001, the first of twenty-eight singles in his career to achieve a number-one position on the country music charts. (Note: Billboard split the country music charts into Hot Country Songs and Country Airplay in 2013; the total of twenty-five counts both charts.) Included in these number-one singles is a consecutive streak of seventeen, lasting from "Hillbilly Bone" (a duet with Trace Adkins) in early 2010 to "Came Here to Forget" in 2016. Most of Shelton's singles have also entered the Billboard Hot 100, the highest being the number twelve peak of "Boys 'Round Here" (which features backing vocals from the Pistol Annies and multiple other artists). Shelton also has four featured credits which have charted, one of which was the multi-artist medley "Forever Country" in 2016, which reached number one on Hot Country Songs credited to the Artists of Then, Now, and Forever. Several non-single releases have charted, including multiple seasonal cuts from his 2012 Christmas release Cheers, It's Christmas, preview tracks from studio albums prior to their release, and duet performances with contestants on the television singing competition The Voice, on which Shelton is a judge.

Of Shelton's twelve studio albums, ten have achieved a certification from the Recording Industry Association of America (RIAA): Red River Blue (2011) and Based on a True Story... (2013) are his most commercially successful, having achieved double-platinum and triple-platinum certification for shipments of two million and three million in the United States, respectively. The 2010 compilation Loaded: The Best of Blake Shelton is also certified platinum for shipments of one million. Most of his singles also have RIAA certifications honoring a threshold number of certified downloads, with the highest being "Honey Bee", "God's Country", "God Gave Me You" (a cover of Dave Barnes), and "Boys 'Round Here", all of which have been certified multi-platinum for four million downloads and five million downloads, respectively.

== Albums ==
=== Studio albums ===
List of studio albums, with selected chart positions, sales figures and certifications
Title	Album details	Peak chart positions						Sales	Certifications
Title	Album details	US	US Country	AUS	CAN	NZ	UK Country	Sales	Certifications
Blake Shelton	Released: July 31, 2001; Label: Giant Records; Formats: CD, cassette	45	3	—	—	—	—		RIAA: Platinum
The Dreamer	Released: February 4, 2003; Label: Warner Bros. Nashville; Formats: CD, digital download	8	2	—	—	—	—		RIAA: Gold
Blake Shelton's Barn & Grill	Released: October 26, 2004; Label: Warner Bros. Nashville; Formats: CD, digital download	20	3	—	—	—	—		RIAA: Platinum
Pure BS	Released: May 1, 2007; Label: Warner Bros. Nashville; Formats: CD, digital download	8	2	—	—	—	—		RIAA: Gold
Startin' Fires	Released: November 18, 2008; Label: Warner Bros. Nashville; Formats: CD, digital download	34	7	—	—	—	—		
Red River Blue	Released: July 12, 2011; Label: Warner Bros. Nashville; Formats: CD, digital download	1	1	100	13	—	—	US: 1,240,000	RIAA: 2× Platinum
Cheers, It's Christmas	Released: October 2, 2012; Label: Warner Bros. Nashville; Formats: CD, digital download	8	2	—	19	—	—	US: 688,400	RIAA: Gold; MC: Gold
Based on a True Story...	Released: March 26, 2013; Label: Warner Bros. Nashville; Formats: CD, digital download	3	1	38	3	—	—	US: 1,460,000	RIAA: 3× Platinum; MC: Platinum
Bringing Back the Sunshine	Released: September 30, 2014; Label: Warner Bros. Nashville; Formats: CD, digital download	1	1	46	4	—	2	US: 448,000	RIAA: Platinum
If I'm Honest	Released: May 20, 2016; Label: Warner Bros. Nashville; Formats: CD, digital download	3	1	13	3	21	2	US: 627,300	RIAA: Platinum
Texoma Shore	Released: November 3, 2017; Label: Warner Bros. Nashville; Formats: CD, digital download	4	1	23	11	— (Note: Texoma Shore did not enter the NZ Top 40 Albums Chart, but peaked at number four on the NZ Heatseeker Albums Chart.)	12	US: 257,100	RIAA: Gold
Body Language	Released: May 21, 2021; Label: Warner Bros. Nashville / Ten Point Productions; Formats: CD, digital download, streaming	18	3	—	50	—	—		
For Recreational Use Only	Scheduled: May 9, 2025; Label: Wheelhouse; Formats: CD, digital download, streaming	46	8	—	—	—	—		
"—" denotes releases that did not chart

=== Compilations ===
Title	Album details	Peak chart positions				Certifications	Sales
Title	Album details	US	US Country	AUS	CAN	Certifications	Sales
Blake Shelton – The Essentials	Release date: December 22, 2009; Label: Warner Bros./iTunes; Formats: CD, music download	—	—	—	—		
Loaded: The Best of Blake Shelton	Release date: November 9, 2010; Label: Reprise Nashville; Formats: CD, music download	18	4	—	—	RIAA: Platinum	US: 1,000,000
Original Album Series	Release date: September 25, 2012; Label: Warner Bros. Nashville; Formats: CD, music download	—	50	—	—		
Reloaded: 20 #1 Hits	Release date: October 23, 2015; Label: Warner Bros. Nashville; Formats: CD, music download	5	2	—	12	RIAA: Gold	US: 373,100
Fully Loaded: God's Country	Release date: December 13, 2019; Label: Warner Bros. Nashville; Formats: CD, download, streaming	2	1	95	11	RIAA: Gold; MC: Gold	US: 156,800
"—" denotes releases that did not chart.

== Extended plays ==
Title	Details	Peak chart positions		Sales
Title	Details	US	US Country	Sales
Blake Shelton: Collector's Edition	Release date: February 26, 2008; Label: Warner Bros. Nashville; Formats: CD, music download	157	27	
Hillbilly Bone	Release date: March 2, 2010; Label: Reprise Nashville; Formats: CD, music download	3	2	US: 370,000
All About Tonight	Release date: August 10, 2010; Label: Reprise Nashville; Formats: CD, music download	6	1	US: 238,000
Blake Shelton Live	Release date: August 25, 2017; Label: Warner Bros. Nashville; Formats: streaming services	—	—	
Love Language	Release date: February 2, 2024; Label: Warner Bros. Nashville; Formats: streaming services	—	—	
"—" denotes releases that did not chart.

== Singles ==
=== As lead artist ===
List of singles as lead artist, with selected chart positions, certifications and album name
Title	Year	Peak chart positions							Certifications	Album
Title	Year	US	US Country	US Country Airplay	AUS	AUS Country	CAN	CAN Country	Certifications	Album
"Austin"	2001	18	1		—	—	—	—	RIAA: 2× Platinum	Blake Shelton
"All Over Me"	2001	— (Note: "All Over Me" did not enter the Billboard Hot 100 but peaked at number ten on the Bubbling Under Hot 100 chart.)	18		—	—	—	—		Blake Shelton
"Ol' Red"	2002	— (Note: "Ol' Red" did not enter the Billboard Hot 100 but peaked at number one on the Bubbling Under Hot 100 chart.)	14		—	—	—	—	RIAA: 2× Platinum	Blake Shelton
"The Baby"	2002	28	1		—	—	—	—		The Dreamer
"Heavy Liftin'"	2003	—	32		—	—	—	—		The Dreamer
"Playboys of the Southwestern World"	2003	—	24		—	—	—	—		The Dreamer
"When Somebody Knows You That Well"	2004	—	37		—	—	—	—		Blake Shelton's Barn & Grill
"Some Beach"	2004	28	1		—	—	—	3	RIAA: Platinum	Blake Shelton's Barn & Grill
"Goodbye Time"	2005	73	10		—	—	—	18		Blake Shelton's Barn & Grill
"Nobody but Me"	2005	60	4		—	—	—	7		Blake Shelton's Barn & Grill
"Don't Make Me"	2006	79	12		—	—	—	34		Pure BS
"The More I Drink"	2007	— (Note: "The More I Drink" did not enter the Billboard Hot 100 but peaked at number two on the Bubbling Under Hot 100 chart.)	19		—	—	—	48	RIAA: Gold	Pure BS
"Home"	2008	41	1		—	—	—	36	RIAA: Platinum	Pure BS
"She Wouldn't Be Gone"	2008	43	1		—	—	70	7	RIAA: Platinum	Startin' Fires
"I'll Just Hold On"	2009	76	8		—	—	—	40		Startin' Fires
"Hillbilly Bone" (featuring Trace Adkins)	2009	40	1		—	—	84	8	RIAA: Platinum	Hillbilly Bone
"All About Tonight"	2010	37	1		—	—	63	3	RIAA: Gold	All About Tonight
"Who Are You When I'm Not Looking"	2010	46	1		—	—	72	3	RIAA: 2× Platinum	All About Tonight
"Honey Bee"	2011	13	1		—	—	28	1	RIAA: 4× Platinum; RMNZ: Gold	Red River Blue
"God Gave Me You"	2011	22	1		—	—	38	1	RIAA: 5× Platinum	Red River Blue
"Drink on It"	2012	39	1		—	—	53	1	RIAA: Platinum	Red River Blue
"Over"	2012	43	1		—	—	59	1	RIAA: Platinum	Red River Blue
"Sure Be Cool If You Did"	2013	24	1	1	—	—	32	1	RIAA: 3× Platinum; MC: Platinum	Based on a True Story...
"Boys 'Round Here" (featuring Pistol Annies and Friends)	2013	12	2	1	—	—	12	1	RIAA: 5× Platinum; MC: 3× Platinum; RMNZ: Gold	Based on a True Story...
"Mine Would Be You"	2013	28	2	1	—	—	35	1	RIAA: 2× Platinum; MC: Platinum	Based on a True Story...
"Doin' What She Likes"	2014	35	3	1	—	—	35	1	RIAA: Platinum; MC: Gold	Based on a True Story...
"My Eyes" (featuring Gwen Sebastian)	2014	39	4	1	—	—	39	1	RIAA: Platinum; MC: Gold	Based on a True Story...
"Neon Light"	2014	43	3	1	—	—	49	1	RIAA: Platinum; MC: Gold	Bringing Back the Sunshine
"Lonely Tonight" (featuring Ashley Monroe)	2014	47	2	1	—	—	42	1	RIAA: Platinum; MC: Gold	Bringing Back the Sunshine
"Sangria"	2015	38	3	1	—	—	43	1	RIAA: 2× Platinum; MC: Platinum	Bringing Back the Sunshine
"Gonna"	2015	54	4	1	—	—	69	1	RIAA: Gold	Bringing Back the Sunshine
"Came Here to Forget"	2016	36	2	1	—	—	56	1	RIAA: Platinum; MC: Platinum	If I'm Honest
"Savior's Shadow"	2016	—	50	—	—	—	—	—		If I'm Honest
"She's Got a Way with Words"	2016	61	8	7	—	—	76	2	RIAA: Platinum; MC: Gold	If I'm Honest
"A Guy with a Girl"	2016	42	3	1	—	—	77	1	RIAA: Platinum; MC: Gold	If I'm Honest
"Every Time I Hear That Song"	2017	56	8	1	—	—	100	2	RIAA: Gold	If I'm Honest
"I'll Name the Dogs"	2017	56	6	1	—	—	78	1	RIAA: Platinum; MC: Platinum	Texoma Shore
"I Lived It"	2018	63	8	3	—	—	— (Note: "I Lived It" did not enter the Canadian Hot 100 but peaked at number 35 on the Hot Canadian Digital Song Sales chart.)	1	RIAA: Gold; MC: Gold	Texoma Shore
"Turnin' Me On"	2018	— (Note: "Turnin' Me On" did not enter the Billboard Hot 100 but peaked at number one on the Bubbling Under Hot 100 chart.)	14	10	—	—	—	20		Texoma Shore
"God's Country"	2019	17	1	1	—	32	25	1	RIAA: 4× Platinum; MC: Platinum; RMNZ: Platinum	Fully Loaded: God's Country
"Dive Bar" (with Garth Brooks)	2019	78	17	6	—	—	—	42		Fun
"Hell Right" (featuring Trace Adkins)	2019	99	14	18	—	27	— (Note: "Hell Right" did not enter the Canadian Hot 100 but peaked at number 19 on the Hot Canadian Digital Song Sales chart.)	36	RIAA: Gold; MC: Gold	Fully Loaded: God's Country
"Nobody but You" (with Gwen Stefani)	2020	18	2	1	— (Note: "Nobody but You" did not enter the ARIA Singles Chart but peaked at number 31 on the ARIA Digital Track Chart.)	9	38	1	RIAA: 2× Platinum; MC: Platinum	Fully Loaded: God's Country
"Happy Anywhere" (featuring Gwen Stefani)	2020	32	3	1	—	2	41	1	RIAA: Platinum; MC: Platinum	Body Language
"Minimum Wage"	2021	67	12	9	—	1	58	10		Body Language
"Come Back as a Country Boy"	2021	81	18	12	—	—	55	3		Body Language
"No Body"	2022	— (Note: "No Body" did not enter the Billboard Hot 100 but peaked at number 15 on the Bubbling Under Hot 100 chart.)	25	18	—	—	76	7		Non-album single
"Purple Irises" (with Gwen Stefani)	2024	—	40	35	—	—	— (Note: "Purple Irises" did not enter the Canadian Hot 100 but peaked at number 19 on the Hot Canadian Digital Song Sales chart.)	—		Bouquet
"Texas"	2024	61	16	2	—	—	69	1	MC: Gold	For Recreational Use Only
"Stay Country or Die Tryin'"	2025	63	22	1	—	—	96	5		For Recreational Use Only
"Let Him In Anyway"	2026	—	45	15	—	—	—	33		For Recreational Use Only
"—" denotes a recording that did not chart or was not released in that region.

=== As featured artist ===
List of singles as featured artist, with selected chart positions, certifications and album name
Title	Year	Peak chart positions										Certifications	Album
Title	Year	US	AUS	AUT	CAN	GER	IRE	NZ	SCO	SWI	UK	Certifications	Album
"Just a Fool" (Christina Aguilera featuring Blake Shelton)	2012	71	—	—	37	—	—	—	—	—	—		Lotus
"Forever Country" (as part of Artists of Then, Now & Forever)	2016	21	26	—	25	—	—	— (Note: "Forever Country" did not enter the NZ Top 40 Singles Chart, but peaked at number one on the NZ Heatseeker Singles Chart.)	29	—	— (Note: "Forever Country" did not enter the UK Singles Chart but peaked at number 58 on the UK Singles Downloads Chart.)	RIAA: Gold	Non-album single
"You Make It Feel Like Christmas" (Gwen Stefani featuring Blake Shelton)	2017	46	52	29	40	30	57	— (Note: "You Make It Feel Like Christmas" did not enter the NZ Top 40 Singles Chart, but peaked at number eight on the NZ Heatseeker Singles Chart.)	57	39	69	RIAA: Platinum; BPI: Gold; RMNZ: Gold	You Make It Feel Like Christmas
"Get Ready" (Pitbull featuring Blake Shelton)	2020	— (Note: "Get Ready" did not enter the Billboard Hot 100 but peaked at number 35 on the Digital Song Sales chart.)	—	—	— (Note: "Get Ready" did not enter the Canadian Hot 100 but peaked at number 16 on the Hot Canadian Digital Song Sales chart.)	—	—	—	—	—	—		Libertad 548
"Tuesday I'll Be Gone" (John Anderson featuring Blake Shelton)	2020	—	—	—	—	—	—	—	—	—	—		Years
"Then a Girl Walks In" (Shenandoah featuring Blake Shelton)	2021	—	—	—	—	—	—	—	—	—	—		Every Road
"Out in the Middle" (Zac Brown Band featuring Blake Shelton)	2022	—	—	—	—	—	—	—	—	—	—		The Comeback (Deluxe)
"Heaven by Then" (Brantley Gilbert featuring Blake Shelton and Vince Gill)	2022	—	—	—	—	—	—	—	—	—	—		So Help Me God
"Pour Me a Drink" (Post Malone featuring Blake Shelton)	2024	12	33	—	12	—	44	37	—	—	34	BPI: Silver; RMNZ: Platinum	F-1 Trillion
"New Country" (Noah Cyrus featuring Blake Shelton)	2025	—	—	—	—	—	—	—	—	—	—		I Want My Loved Ones to Go with Me
"—" denotes a recording that did not chart or was not released in that region.

=== Promotional singles ===
List of promotional singles, with selected chart positions, certifications and album name
Title	Year	Peak chart positions					Certifications	Album
Title	Year	US	US Country	US Country Airplay	CAN	CAN Country	Certifications	Album
"Footloose"	2011	63	53		59	35	RIAA: Gold	Footloose
"Ten Times Crazier"	2013	— (Note: "Ten Times Crazier" did not enter the Billboard Hot 100 but peaked at number 24 on the Bubbling Under Hot 100 chart.)	36	—	66	—		Based on a True Story...
"Go Ahead and Break My Heart" (featuring Gwen Stefani)	2016	70	13	—	— (Note: "Go Ahead and Break My Heart" did not enter the Canadian Hot 100 but peaked at number 17 on the Hot Canadian Digital Song Sales chart.)	—		If I'm Honest
"Straight Outta Cold Beer"	2016	—	36	—	—	—		If I'm Honest
"Jesus Got a Tight Grip"	2019	—	38	—	—	—		Fully Loaded: God's Country
"Bible Verses"	2021	—	—	—	—	—		Body Language
"Hangin' On" (with Gwen Stefani)	2025	—	—	—	—	—		For Recreational Use Only
"—" denotes a recording that did not chart or was not released in that region.

== Other charted songs ==
Year	Single	Peak chart positions					Certifications	Album
Year	Single	US	US Hot Country	US Country Airplay	CAN	CAN Country	Certifications	Album
2011	"I Won't Back Down" (with Dia Frampton)	57	—	—	67	—		—N/a
2012	"Soul Man" (with Jermaine Paul)	— (Note: "Soul Man" did not enter the Billboard Hot 100, but peaked at number 8 on the Bubbling Under Hot 100 Singles chart.)	—	—	—	—		—N/a
2012	"Jingle Bell Rock" (with Miranda Lambert)	—	37	34	—	45		Cheers, It's Christmas
2012	"Home" (with Michael Bublé)	—	36	45	—	—	RMNZ: Gold	Cheers, It's Christmas
2012	"Let It Snow! Let It Snow! Let It Snow!"	—	—	57	—	—		Cheers, It's Christmas
2012	"Blue Christmas" (with Pistol Annies)	—	—	59	—	—		Cheers, It's Christmas
2013	"Steve McQueen" (with Cassadee Pope)	—	42	—	—	—		The Complete Season 3 Collection (Cassadee Pope)
2013	"Dude (Looks Like a Lady)" (with Terry McDermott)	—	43	—	—	—		—N/a
2013	"There's a New Kid in Town" (with Kelly Clarkson)	—	—	44	—	—		Cheers, It's Christmas
2013	"The Christmas Song"	—	—	52	—	—		Cheers, It's Christmas
2013	"The Very Best Time of the Year" (with Trypta-Phunk)	—	—	54	—	—		Cheers, It's Christmas
2013	"Do You Remember"	—	42	—	—	—		Based on a True Story...
2013	"Country on the Radio"	—	49	—	—	—		Based on a True Story...
2013	"Home" (with Usher)	— (Note: "Home" did not enter the Billboard Hot 100, but peaked at number 19 on the Bubbling Under Hot 100 Singles chart.)	36	—	—	—		—N/a
2013	"Timber, I'm Falling in Love" (with Danielle Bradbery)	— (Note: "Timber, I'm Falling in Love" did not enter the Billboard Hot 100, but peaked at number 1 on the Bubbling Under Hot 100 Singles chart.)	30	—	71	—		The Complete Season 4 Collection (Danielle Bradbery)
2013	"Celebrity" (with The Swon Brothers)	—	47	—	—	—		The Complete Season 4 Collection (The Swon Brothers)
2014	"A Country Boy Can Survive" (with Jake Worthington)	— (Note: "A Country Boy Can Survive" did not enter the Billboard Hot 100, but peaked at number 3 on the Bubbling Under Hot 100 Singles chart.)	27	—	—	—		The Complete Season 6 Collection (Jake Worthington)
2014	"Buzzin'" (with RaeLynn)	—	44	—	—	—		Bringing Back the Sunshine
2015	"Boots On" (with Craig Wayne Boyd)	—	33	—	—	—		The Complete Season 7 Collection (Craig Wayne Boyd)
2016	"Islands in the Stream" (with Emily Ann Roberts)	— (Note: "Islands in the Stream" did not enter the Billboard Hot 100, but peaked at number 1 on the Bubbling Under Hot 100 Singles chart.)	19	—	—	—		The Complete Season 9 Collection (Emily Ann Roberts)
2016	"Rhinestone Cowboy" (with Barrett Baber)	—	40	—	—	—		The Complete Season 9 Collection (Barrett Baber)
2016	"Treat Her Right" (with Sundance Head)	—	24	—	—	—		The Complete Season 11 Collection (Sundance Head)
2017	"There's a Tear in My Beer" (with Lauren Duski)	—	46	—	—	—		The Complete Season 12 Collection (Lauren Duski)
2017	"At the House"	—	49	33	—	—		Texoma Shore
2017	"Money"	—	—	36	—	—		Texoma Shore
2017	"Why Me"	—	—	37	—	—		Texoma Shore
"—" denotes releases that did not chart.

== Videography ==
=== Video albums ===
Title	Album details	Certifications (sales threshold)
Blake Shelton's Barn & Grill: A Video Collection	Release date: October 12, 2004; Label: Warner Bros. Nashville; Formats: DVD	RIAA: Gold

=== Music videos ===
Year	Title	Director
2001	"Austin"	Deaton Flanigen
2002	"Ol' Red"	Peter Zavadil
2002	"The Baby"	Peter Zavadil
2003	"Heavy Liftin'"	Wes Edwards
2004	"Some Beach"	Peter Zavadil
2005	"Goodbye Time"	Peter Zavadil
2005	"Nobody But Me"	Peter Zavadil
2006	"Don't Make Me"	Roman White
2007	"The More I Drink"	Roman White
2008	"Home"	Stephen Scott
2008	"She Wouldn't Be Gone"	Scott Speer
2009	"Hillbilly Bone" (with Trace Adkins)	Roman White
2010	"All About Tonight"	Jon Small
2010	"Who Are You When I'm Not Looking"	Trey Fanjoy
2011	"Kiss My Country Ass"	Jon Small
2011	"Honey Bee"	Trey Fanjoy
2011	"God Gave Me You"	Trey Fanjoy
2011	"Footloose"	Shaun Silva
2012	"Over"	Roman White
2012	"Let It Snow! Let It Snow! Let It Snow!"	Beth McCarthy-Miller
2012	"There's a New Kid in Town"	
2013	"Sure Be Cool If You Did"	Trey Fanjoy
2013	"Boys 'Round Here"	Trey Fanjoy
2014	"Doin' What She Likes"	Mason Dixon
2014	"Neon Light"	Cody Kern
2014	"Lonely Tonight" (with Ashley Monroe)	Shaun Silva
2015	"Sangria"	Trey Fanjoy
2016	"Came Here to Forget"	Trey Fanjoy
2016	"Friends"	Trey Fanjoy
2016	"Savior's Shadow"	
2016	"Forever Country" (Artists of Then, Now & Forever)	Joseph Kahn
2016	"She's Got a Way with Words"	Adam Rothlein
2017	"Every Time I Hear That Song"	Kristin Barlowe
2017	"Doing It to Country Songs"	—N/a
2017	"I'll Name the Dogs"	Adam Rothlein
2018	"I Lived It"	Adam Rothlein
2018	"Turnin' Me On" (Vertical Video)	Chris Rogers
2019	"God's Country"	Sophie Muller
2019	"Hell Right" (with Trace Adkins)	Michael Monaco
2019	"Dive Bar" (with Garth Brooks)	Garth Brooks/Robert Deaton
2020	"Nobody But You"	Sophie Muller
2020	"Tuesday I'll Be Gone" (with John Anderson)	Tim Hardiman
2020	"Get Ready" (with Pitbull)	Gil Green
2020	"Happy Anywhere"	Todd Stefani
