= Fully Loaded: God's Country =

Compilation album by Blake Shelton
- Released: December 13, 2019
- Genre: Country
- Length: 43:00
- Label: Warner Nashville
- Producer: Scott Hendricks

Blake Shelton chronology
Texoma Shore (2017)	Fully Loaded: God's Country (2019)	Body Language (2021)

Singles from Fully Loaded: God's Country
- 1. "God's Country" Released: March 29, 2019; 2. "Hell Right" Released: August 16, 2019; 3. "Nobody but You" Released: January 21, 2020

Fully Loaded: God's Country is a 2019 compilation album by American country music singer Blake Shelton. It was released on December 13, 2019, via Warner Records Nashville. The album includes his most successful singles from Shelton's two previous albums, If I'm Honest and Texoma Shore, along with four new songs and a cover. Among the new songs are "God's Country," the Trace Adkins duet "Hell Right," and the Gwen Stefani duet "Nobody but You," both released as singles. Fully Loaded: God's Country reached the number-one position on the Billboard Top Country Albums chart.

== Content ==
Shelton announced the album in October 2019, by which point the blog The Boot had revealed the track listing. The album consists of the singles (except "Savior's Shadow") from Shelton's two previous albums, If I'm Honest and Texoma Shore, plus four new songs and a cover of Bobby Bare's "Tequila Sheila".

== Critical reception ==
Rating it 3.5 out of 5 stars, Stephen Thomas Erlewine of AllMusic wrote that "the new cuts are strong enough, and when they're paired with the hits...it amounts to a pretty solid Blake Shelton album, albeit one that feels like the holding pattern it was intended to be."

== Commercial performance ==
Fully Loaded debuted at No. 1 on Billboard's Top Country Albums, which made this Shelton's seventh No. 1 on the chart. It also debuted at No. 2 on Billboard 200, having accrued 96,000 album-equivalent unit in the first week, 83,000 of which are in traditional album sales. It has sold 156,800 copies in the United States as of March 2020, and 1,106,000 units consumed.

== Track listing ==
Fully Loaded: God's Country track listing
No.	Title	Writer(s)	Length
1.	"God's Country"	Devin Dawson; Michael Hardy; Jordan Schmidt	3:25
2.	"Hell Right" (featuring Trace Adkins)	David Garcia; Hardy; Brett Tyler	3:28
3.	"Nobody but You" (with Gwen Stefani)	Ross Copperman; Shane McAnally; Josh Osborne; Tommy Lee James	3:14
4.	"Came Here to Forget" (from If I'm Honest, 2016)	Deric Ruttan; Craig Wiseman	3:41
5.	"She's Got a Way with Words" (from If I'm Honest, 2016)	Andy Albert; Marc Beeson; Wyatt Earp	3:12
6.	"A Guy with a Girl" (from If I'm Honest, 2016)	Ashley Gorley; Bryan Simpson	3:11
7.	"Every Time I Hear That Song" (from If I'm Honest, 2016)	Chris Lindsey; Aimee Mayo; Brad Warren; Brett Warren	3:36
8.	"I'll Name the Dogs" (from Texoma Shore, 2017)	Matt Dragstrem; Ben Hayslip; Josh Thompson	3:03
9.	"I Lived It" (from Texoma Shore, 2017)	Akins; Copperman; Gorley; Hayslip	3:38
10.	"Turnin' Me On" (from Texoma Shore, 2017)	Jessi Alexander; Osborne; Blake Shelton	4:49
11.	"Jesus Got a Tight Grip"	Akins; Alexander; Shelton; Chase McGill	3:20
12.	"Tequila Sheila" (non-album cover, 2018)	Mac Davis; Shel Silverstein	4:24
Total length:			43:00

== Personnel ==
Adapted from AllMusic

- Blake Shelton – lead vocals
- Trace Adkins – duet vocals on "Hell Right"
- Gwen Stefani – duet vocals on "Nobody But You"
- Jessi Alexander – background vocals
- Bobby Bare – vocals on "Tequila Sheila"
- Sam Bergeson – electric guitar, keyboards
- Blake Bollinger – programming, synthesizer
- Mike Brignardello – bass guitar
- Kara Britz – background vocals
- Tom Bukovac – electric guitar
- Perry Coleman – background vocals
- Devin Dawson – background vocals
- Jeneé Fleenor – fiddle
- Paul Franklin – pedal steel guitar
- David Garcia – programming, background vocals
- Kenny Greenberg – baritone guitar, electric guitar
- Aubrey Haynie – fiddle, mandolin
- Charlie Judge – synthesizer
- Troy Lancaster – electric guitar
- Brent Mason – electric guitar
- Rob McNelley – electric guitar
- Michael Hardy – acoustic guitar, background vocals
- Gordon Mote – Hammond B-3 organ, piano, synthesizer, Wurlitzer
- Justin Niebank – programming
- Jimmy Olander – electric guitar on "I'll Name the Dogs"
- Russ Pahl – pedal steel guitar
- Jimmie Lee Sloas – bass guitar
- Bryan Sutton – acoustic guitar, mandolin
- Ilya Toshinsky – bouzouki, 12-string guitar, acoustic guitar, resonator guitar
- Brett Tyler – background vocals
- Derek Wells – electric guitar
- Lonnie Wilson – drums
- Brad Winters – background vocals
- Nir Z. – drums, percussion, programming

== Charts ==
=== Weekly charts ===
Weekly chart performance for Fully Loaded: God's Country
Chart (2019)	Peak position
Australian Albums (ARIA)	95
Canadian Albums (Billboard)	11
US Billboard 200	2
US Top Country Albums (Billboard)	1

=== Year-end charts ===
2020 year-end chart performance for Fully Loaded: God's Country
Chart (2020)	Position
US Billboard 200	54
US Top Country Albums (Billboard)	4

2021 year-end chart performance for Fully Loaded: God's Country
Chart (2021)	Position
US Top Country Albums (Billboard)	20

2022 year-end chart performance for Fully Loaded: God's Country
Chart (2022)	Position
US Top Country Albums (Billboard)	43

== Certifications ==
Certifications for Fully Loaded: God's Country
Region	Certification	Certified units/sales
Canada (Music Canada)	Gold	40,000^{‡}
United States (RIAA)	Gold	500,000^{‡}
^{‡} Sales+streaming figures based on certification alone.
