= Nobody but You (Blake Shelton and Gwen Stefani song) =

2020 song by Blake Shelton and Gwen Stefani

Single by Blake Shelton and Gwen Stefani

from the album Fully Loaded: God's Country
- Released: January 21, 2020
- Recorded: 2019
- Studio: Sound Stage Studios (Nashville, TN); Warner Studios (Nashville, TN); Texoma Shore Studios (Tishomingo, OK); Pickle Sans Studios (Nashville, TN)
- Genre: Country; pop
- Length: 3:15
- Label: Warner Nashville
- Songwriters: Ross Copperman; Shane McAnally; Josh Osborne; Tommy Lee James
- Producer: Scott Hendricks

Blake Shelton singles chronology
"Hell Right" (2019)	"Nobody but You" (2020)	"Get Ready" (2020)

Gwen Stefani singles chronology
"Secret Santa" (2018)	"Nobody but You" (2020)	"Happy Anywhere" (2020)

Music video
- "Nobody but You" on YouTube

"Nobody but You" is a song recorded by American singers Blake Shelton and Gwen Stefani for the former's fifth compilation album, Fully Loaded: God's Country (2019). It was produced by Scott Hendricks and written by Ross Copperman, Shane McAnally, Josh Osborne, and Tommy Lee James. Following "Go Ahead and Break My Heart" (2016) and "You Make It Feel Like Christmas" (2017), "Nobody but You" marks Shelton and Stefani's third collaboration. The song was first revealed in October 2019, although Stefani's contributions remained a secret until a week prior to its release in December of the same year. It was sent to United States country music radio outlets by Warner on January 21, 2020, becoming the third single from the parent album. Promotional acoustic and live versions of the song were released to the public in March and June 2020, respectively.

"Nobody but You" is a country and pop power ballad duet. A love song, Shelton described the song as honest and related it to his relationship with Stefani. Music reviewers gave positive feedback to the song, calling it romantic and heartfelt. Particular praise was aimed at Shelton and Stefani's chemistry, and the song itself received a nomination for the American Music Award for Favorite Country Song at the 2020 ceremony. In the US, the song peaked at number 18 on the Billboard Hot 100 and reached the top spot on the Digital Songs chart, becoming the second and third number one entry for Shelton and Stefani, respectively. The song also charted in Canada and on the ARIA digital component chart in Australia. It has sold more than 288,000 copies in the US in 2020 alone and was the 8th best-selling digital single of the year. It was certified Platinum in both the US and Canada.

Sophie Muller directed the song's accompanying music video, her second joint collaboration with Shelton and Stefani. It serves as a glimpse of the couple's day-to-day life, featuring scenes of them cuddling, eating food at a diner, and visiting the construction site of Shelton's ranch in Tishomingo, Oklahoma. The video was described as romantic and adorable by critics, and received the Collaborative Video of the Year accolade at the 2020 CMT Music Awards. Other promotional music videos for the acoustic and live versions of the song were created, with filming limited to Shelton's ranch due to the COVID-19 pandemic. Shelton and Stefani have performed "Nobody but You" during multiple televised appearances, including at the 62nd Annual Grammy Awards and on the Academy of Country Music's TV special ACM Presents: Our Country (2020). It was also performed at Shelton's Encore Drive-In Nights show in July 2020 and as a surprise during the final leg of Stefani's Just a Girl concert residency in Las Vegas.

== Background and recording ==
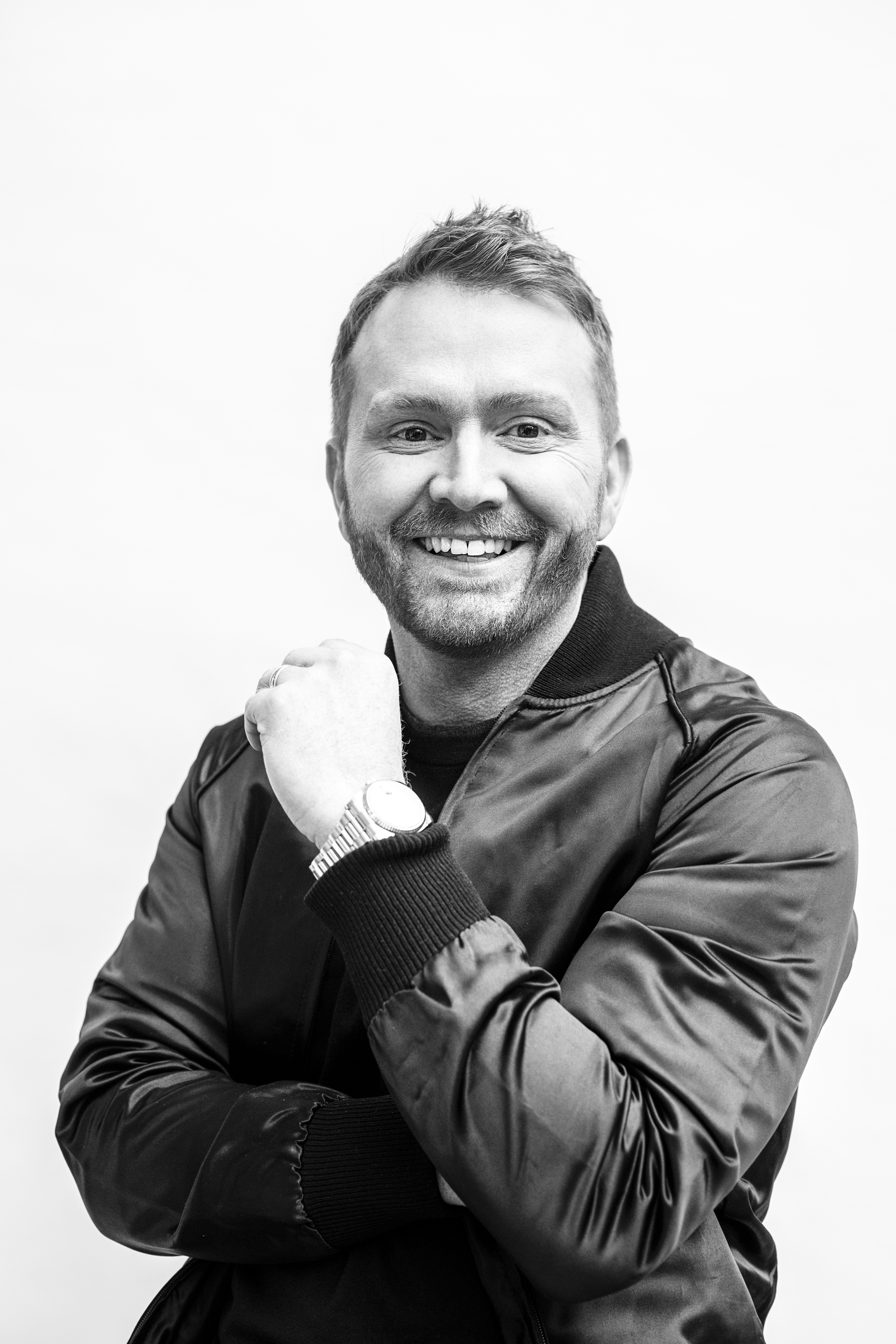
Stefani first learned about "Nobody but You" after working with Shane McAnally (pictured), who suggested that Shelton record it.

On October 23, 2019, Blake Shelton announced the details and revealed the cover art for his third compilation album, Fully Loaded: God's Country (2019). A collection of seven singles from If I'm Honest (2016) and Texoma Shore (2017), it also features five new songs including lead single "God's Country" and "Hell Right", a collaboration with Trace Adkins. "Nobody but You" was first announced during this press release, although Gwen Stefani's role in the song was not mentioned. On December 4 of the same year, Shelton announced that his fiancée, Stefani, would duet with him on the track. In the same announcement, the song's producer and writers were given. During the official album release party for Fully Loaded: God's Country, Shelton revealed how he first became aware of "Nobody but You": "I actually got the song through Gwen because she had been working with Shane McAnally. He told her that he had a song he needed to get to me and sent it to her first and she sent it on to me. I listened to it and I knew, 'Oh my god, I gotta cut this song. This song's incredible.'"

"Nobody but You" was produced by Shelton's longtime collaborator Scott Hendricks and written by Ross Copperman, Shane McAnally, Josh Osborne, and Tommy Lee James. Shelton explained that as soon as the song's lyrics were finalized, he immediately travelled to record his verses with McAnally. In between 2019 concert legs of her Just a Girl concert residency, Stefani flew from Las Vegas to Los Angeles to record her parts at a Hollywood recording studio. Stefani's role in the song was unexpected according to Hendricks, who described her contributions as last minute additions to the track. He revealed: "It wasn't originally set to be a duet at all, [but] she fit like a glove, and it was super easy [to add her vocals]". During an interview streamed live via his Instagram account, Shelton described working with Stefani on the track:

I'm still learning when it comes to recording with Gwen. We’ve only recorded literally a handful of songs together. But the thing that I think that I'm blown away with Gwen is just how hard she works when she gets into the studio. She's not willing to take anything less than greatness... and she's willing to put in the work. I don't think Gwen knows how great of a vocalist she really is.

== Announcement and release ==
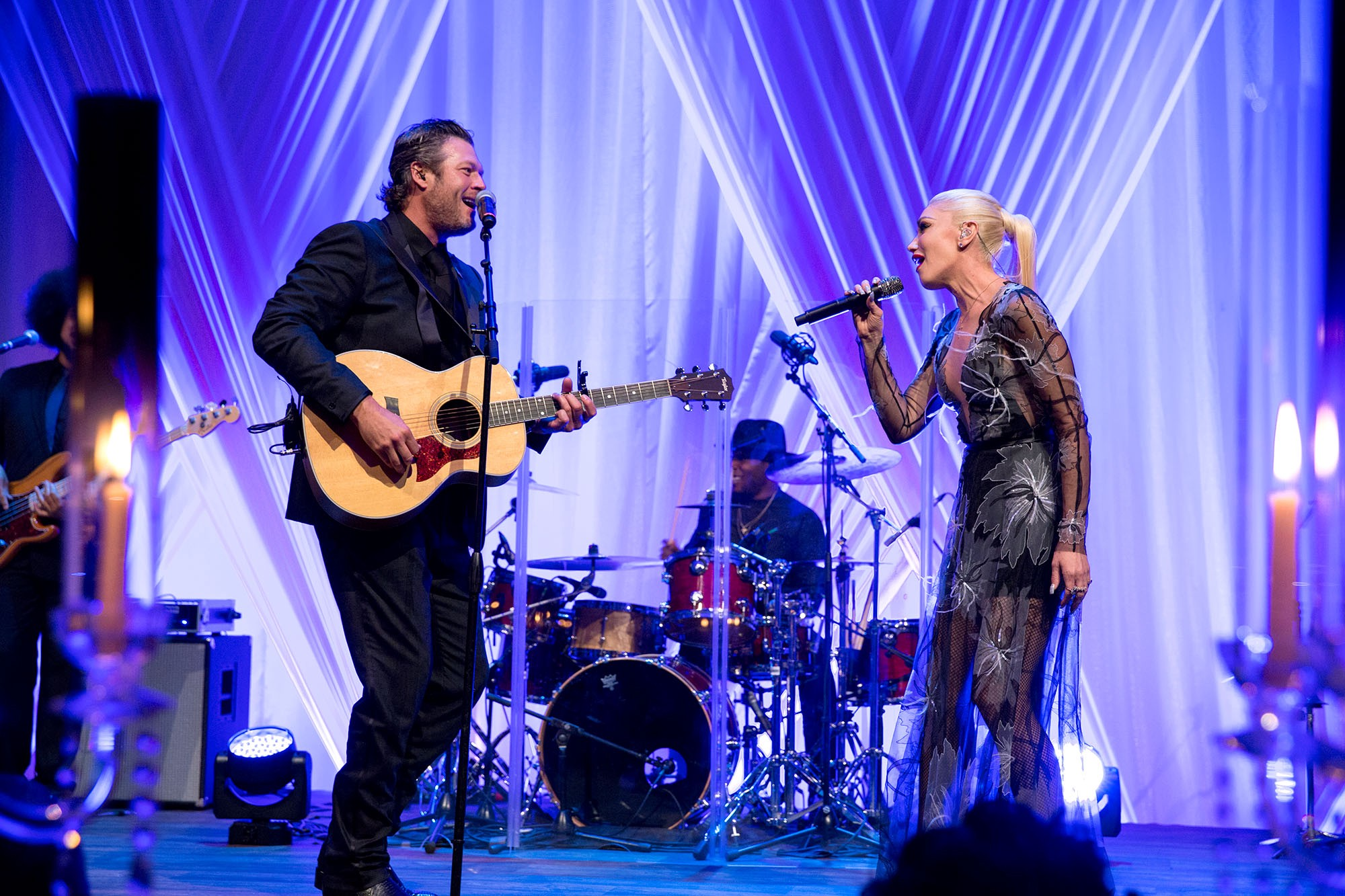
"Nobody but You" marks the third collaboration between Shelton and Stefani, after "Go Ahead and Break My Heart" (2016) and "You Make It Feel Like Christmas" (2017).

"Nobody but You" was first teased by Shelton's Instagram, where he posted a snippet of the song the day before its scheduled premiere. It was Shelton and Stefani's third collaboration. Stefani first appeared as a guest vocalist on the promotional single "Go Ahead and Break My Heart" for his tenth studio album, If I'm Honest, in 2016. The next year, Shelton teamed up with Stefani for the title track to her fourth studio album and first Christmas album, You Make It Feel Like Christmas (2017). In the United States, "Nobody but You" was sent to various digital retailers as a paid download, along with the rest of Fully Loaded: God's Country, on December 13, 2019.

After the release of "Nobody but You", Shelton announced that he considered it to be the most meaningful and important song of his career. Following this announcement, it was revealed that the song would be released to country radio stations as the third single from Fully Loaded: God's Country on January 21, 2020. On March 19 of the same year, Shelton announced that a newly recorded acoustic version of the single would be available for streaming the following day. It was also made available as a digital single on streaming services like Apple Music and features a black and white version of the original cover art. A previously unreleased live recording was distributed, also to Apple Music, on June 26; the new version uses previously unreleased artwork for the single's cover. That same day, a digital extended play exclusive to Spotify users was released, containing all three versions of the song.

== Composition and lyrics ==
Musically, "Nobody but You" is a country and pop power ballad duet, a blend between the singers' two signature styles. Stephen Thomas Erlewine from AllMusic described the single as a power ballad and felt the song displayed Shelton's sweeter side, in contrast to the album's first two singles. Rolling Stone's Jon Freeman agreed, calling it a power ballad and comparing the chorus to Aerosmith's 1998 single "I Don’t Want to Miss a Thing". Shelton described the track as a love song and explained: "The song is not a fairytale, but at the same time it’s the most epic, earth-rattling love song I’ve heard in a long time, because the lyrics are so honest and just say it how it is."

According to the official sheet music published by Musicnotes.com, "Nobody but You" is set in common time and has a moderately slow tempo with 144 beats per minute. The key of the song is in C major, with the pair's vocal range spanning an entire octave, from C_{4} to G_{5} in scientific pitch notation. The song begins with an instrumental intro, followed by two verses, each succeeded by a chorus. The first verse begins using the chord progressions of C–G–Am–F, which are replicated during the other verses; during the chorus, the progressions transition to a structure of C-Am-F. The song contains various forms of instrumentation; in the song, Sam Bergeson plays electric guitar and keyboards, Jimmie Lee Sloas performs on bass guitar, and Nir Z plays percussion. Additionally, Ilya Toshinkiy contributes to the track with acoustic guitar and dulcimer.

Lyrically, the song describes a couple with mutual admiration and love for each other. The song references to God, long-term relationships, and "deep affection". Freeman from Rolling Stone summarized the meaning as "two people declaring their love for each other and the gratitude for the journey that brought them together". Tyler McCarthy from WDBD said "the lyrics don’t hold back in showcasing their passionate love for one another". Several of the verses' lyrics feature Shelton's vocals overlapping with Stefani's, although she sings an octave above him, including in the line "Want to say it now, want to make it clear / For only you and God to hear". They also sing the chorus as a joint effort, with lyrics such as "I don't want to live without you / I don't want to even breathe / I don't want to dream about you / I want to wake up with you next to me".

== Critical reception ==
"Nobody but You" received generally favorable reviews from music critics, many of whom described the song as romantic and loving. Joseph Hudak from Rolling Stone felt that the couple managed to reach "a sweet spot" with the song, while The Tennessean's Matthew Leimkuehler called it touching. Kelli Boyle, a journalist from E! News, called the duet gorgeous and predicted that it will "be played at many a wedding". Annie Reuter of Billboard also enjoyed the song, calling it heartfelt, while Lake Schatz from Consequence of Sound labeled it as sweet. Matt Bjorke, from the online country music publication Roughstock, was pleasantly surprised by the duet and wrote in his review of the song that "Blake and Gwen is something that shouldn't work on many levels yet, particularly here, it does. And it works spectacularly well". Plugged In's Kristin Smith applauded the single and appreciated its positive portrayals of love and commitment; she wrote that it "reminds listeners that a life without the one you love isn’t much of a life at all."

Critics also commented on the acoustic version of "Nobody but You", and many of them called it romantic and special. A contributor to KUPL provided a positive review of the new version, writing: "Blake Shelton and Gwen Stefani prove that the couple who sings together, stay together." Tierney McAfee from Good Housekeeping was impressed as well, stating that the new version will "give you goosebumps". Katie Colley from Entertainment Tonight Canada described the song as romantic and "something special".

On October 26, 2020, the nominations for the American Music Awards were announced. "Nobody but You" was nominated for Favorite Country Song at the 48th annual ceremony, which took place on November 22 of the same year at Microsoft Theater in Los Angeles. The song lost to "10,000 Hours", a 2019 collaborative single by Dan + Shay and Justin Bieber. In February 2021, "Nobody but You" received a nomination for Music Event of the Year at the 56th Academy of Country Music Awards. It serves as Stefani's first nomination at the ceremony.

== Commercial performance ==
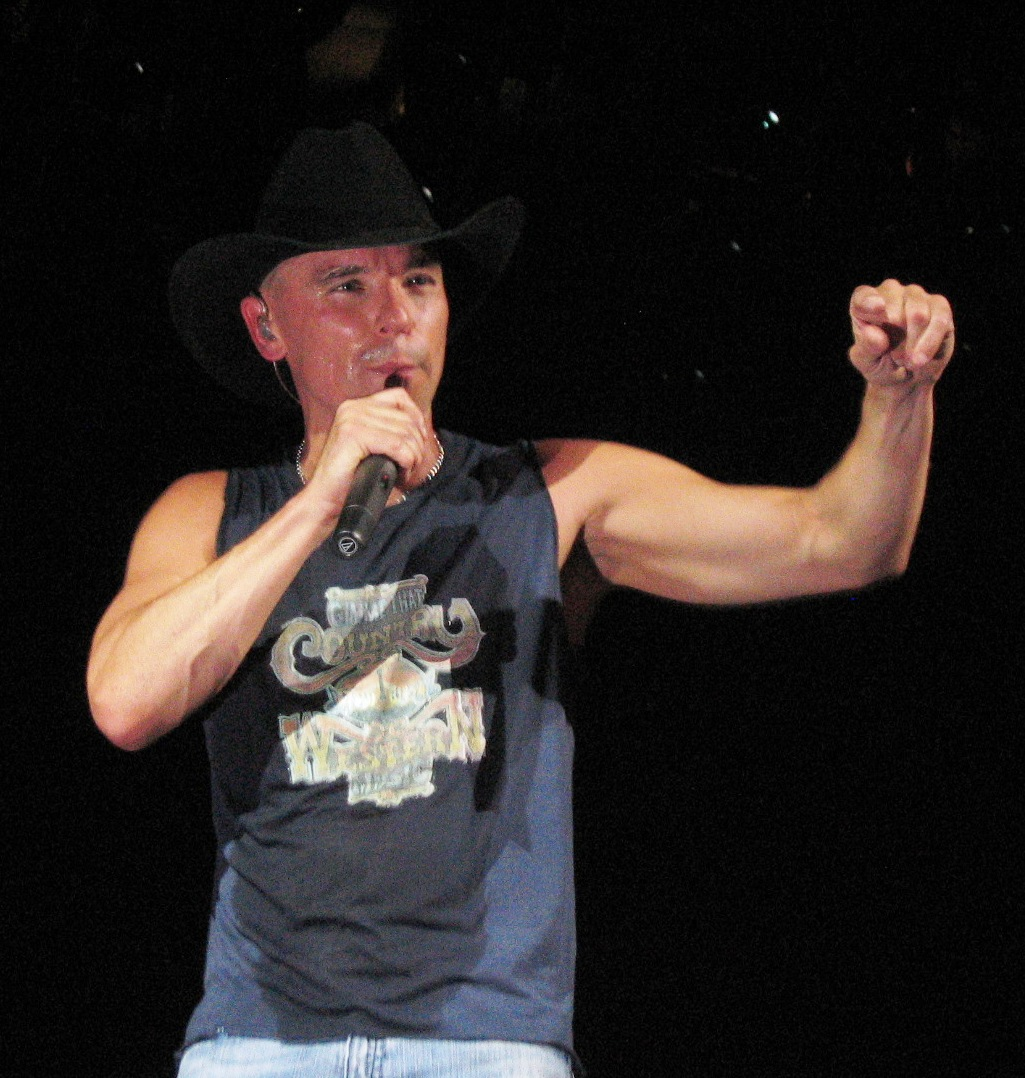
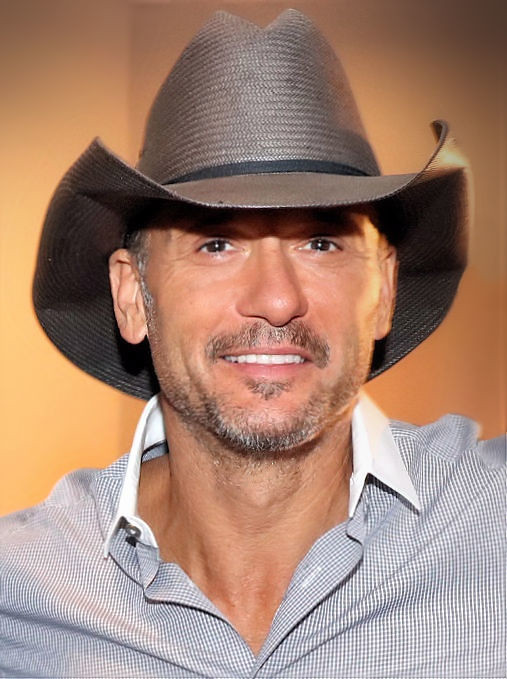
"Nobody but You" became Shelton's 27th chart-topping song on Billboard's Country Airplay chart, ranking him as the third artist with the most number-ones, behind Kenny Chesney (pictured left) who has 30 and Tim McGraw (pictured right) who has 29.

Following the full release of Fully Loaded: God's Country, "Nobody but You" debuted on the Billboard Hot 100 chart in the United States at number 79. It became the pair's second-highest charting effort, behind "Go Ahead and Break My Heart" which reached number 70 in 2016. "Nobody but You" reached the top spot on the Digital Song Sales chart, becoming the final number one of the decade and Shelton's second number one entry after "God's Country", which charted earlier in 2019. For Stefani, it was her third top spot, following "Hollaback Girl" in 2005 and "The Sweet Escape" in 2007. "Nobody but You" generated approximately 4.5 million streams during its first week of availability, and sold 30,000 digital copies. After the release of the song's music video, it reentered the Billboard Hot 100 at number 76 during the week of February 1, 2020. It sold 22,000 downloads that week, adding to 71,000 total, and became the issue's best-performing country song. On April 24, 2020, the song reached its peak position on the chart at number 18. For Shelton, it became his fifth top 20 entry and for Stefani, it was her eighth top 20 entry and best performing release since "The Sweet Escape", which reached number two on the Billboard Hot 100 in April 2007. "Nobody but You" spent 25 weeks on the chart, with its final position being at number 43 for the issue dated July 11, 2020. On the annual Hot 100 year-end chart, the song was ranked as 2020's 52nd best performing song.

During its debut week, "Nobody but You" hit number nine on the US Billboard Hot Country Songs chart and also reached number one on Billboard's Country Digital Song Sales component chart. Before its official release to radio outlets in January 2020, the collaboration entered the Country Airplay chart at number 46. In April 2020, the song reached the top spot in the radio chart, becoming Stefani's first number one on the chart and Shelton's twenty-seventh. It broke the tie for artists with the third most chart-topping entries on the Country Airplay chart, as Alan Jackson and George Strait had 26 number one hits each. Becoming his 27th number one song, Shelton is now placed behind Kenny Chesney who has 30 and Tim McGraw who has 29. On Billboard's year-end music charts for 2020, "Nobody but You" was number 2 on the Country Airplay and number 5 on the Hot Country Songs charts, respectively. It also was ranked among the Country Digital Song Sales and Country Streaming Songs year-end charts. The song also made an appearance on the Rolling Stone Top 100, peaking at number 32. On April 27, 2020, the single was awarded a Gold certification from the Recording Industry Association of America, signifying 500,000 track-equivalent units. That number later increased to 815,000 equivalent units by May 5, 2020, and 1,000,000 by July 22 of the same year, this time receiving a Platinum certification from the RIAA. Ultimately, "Nobody but You" was the eighth most purchased digital song in the US in 2020, according to Billboard's year-end Digital Song Sales chart. As of January 2021, it has sold 288,000 copies in the US.

Outside the United States, "Nobody but You" charted in Canada on the Canadian Hot 100. For the week ending December 27, 2019, it debuted at number 93, becoming Shelton's second-lowest entry since 2017's "Every Time I Hear That Song" at number 100. During the week of January 31, 2020, the single re-entered the Canadian Hot 100, improving its peak to number 79. It eventually reached number 38 on the chart, on May 8 of the same year. The new peak position became Stefani's first top 40 hit in nearly six years since her comeback single "Baby Don't Lie" reached number 21 in 2014. In total, "Nobody but You" spent 20 non-consecutive weeks within the ranks of the Canadian Hot 100 chart. It fared well on the digital component chart, where it reached the top ten and peaked at number 3. On the accompanying year-end list, "Nobody but You" was ranked as 2020's 21st-best performing song on the chart. It also charted on Billboard's Canada Country chart, where it claimed the top position on May 23, 2020. Music Canada awarded the song a Silver certification on April 2, 2020, denoting track-equivalent sales of 40,000 copies. On July 6 of the same year, the song received a Gold certification for 80,000 units. In Australia, the single did not reach the ARIA Singles Chart, but instead entered the country's official digital tracks chart. During the song's release week in 2019, it debuted at number 36. After the release of the song's music video in 2020, it re-entered the chart and peaked at number 31. On the country's official Country Top 50 chart, published by The Music Network, "Nobody but You" peaked at number 9, spending a total of 22 weeks charting.

== Music videos ==
=== Official video ===
The music video for "Nobody but You" contains footage presented as if it were a home video.

The official music video for "Nobody but You" was filmed throughout November and December 2019 in Los Angeles and near Shelton's ranch in rural Oklahoma. It was directed by English director and Stefani's long-time collaborator Sophie Muller, who also directed the video for "You Make It Feel Like Christmas" in 2018. Mentions of a music video for the track originated right after the song's official release by Shelton himself; he stated: "There is no way I am going to have a duet with Gwen Stefani and not [make a music video]. [...] she is drop-dead beautiful and if I can have her in one of my videos, people actually look at my video for once in my entire career, you're damn right we're gonna do the video." To coincide with the song's official distribution to radio playlists, the two revealed the music video's release date to be January 21, 2020; both singers uploaded teaser clips and pictures to their Instagram accounts in the days leading up to the event. In a press release, Shelton's team described the video as "[showing] the couple from two different worlds coming together to create one blended and loving life". As previously reported, the video was released to Shelton's YouTube channel on January 21, 2020. It was also broadcast on the monitor display in Times Square in Midtown Manhattan throughout the same day.

The video begins with Shelton walking through the woods with his dog, Betty. Footage of Stefani in the same setting is shown, with her rising from the ground as leaves fall from the trees surrounding her. During the first chorus, scenes of the two singing along are intermixed. The next part of the video shows the couple standing behind a guard rail overlooking and admiring large waves. Later scenes feature Shelton and Stefani cuddling on a couch with Betty, enjoying a meal at a diner, and performing the song live in formal attire. Additional clips of the two, filmed in a home video style, show them driving in a truck in front of a green screen. Another one shows the couple visiting the construction site of a house, suggesting that the two are building a home and "hinting that this is the place where they'll live happily ever together"; the final scene of the video displays Shelton and Stefani preparing to kiss before the screen cuts to black.

Boyle from E! News considered the home video footage to be among the best parts of the music video; she called the scene where Shelton kisses Stefani at the construction site to be "as adorable as it sounds". Critics such as Stephen Hubbard from Good Morning America described the video as dramatic and romantic, and the staff at KTLO-FM found it to be theatrical as well. Freeman from Rolling Stone explained that the video's central message directly relates to the song's lyrics of "wanting to share every moment with the person they love." A staff member of CMT felt that Shelton's "sly" sense of humor was evident in the video.

On September 22, 2020, it was unveiled that "Nobody but You" received a nomination for Collaborative Video of the Year at the 2020 CMT Music Awards held in Nashville, Tennessee. It marks Stefani's first nomination at a CMT Music Awards ceremony. At the October 21 ceremony, it was announced that the pair won the award; Shelton, who had pre-recorded a digital acceptance speech due to COVID-19 pandemic, joked: "I told Gwen when I saw who the other nominees were in our category, I was like, 'That would've been cool, but I don't know what our chance of beating Justin Bieber are, but here we are."

=== Other videos ===
Besides the official original video, several other music videos for "Nobody but You" were produced. The second video, featuring the acoustic version of the song, was released on March 20, 2020. With the exception of the original, official music video, the videos were filmed during Shelton and Stefani's self-quarantine due to the COVID-19 pandemic. The second clip, which was filmed in a vertical video format, was also shot at Shelton's ranch in Tishomingo, Oklahoma. It features the pair performing outside on Shelton's porch, with shots of the Oklahoma sky behind them. In the video, Shelton wears a button up shirt and blue jeans as he plays the guitar. Stefani's look for the clip was inspired by cowgirls, as she wears a white-colored ensemble. Melinda Lorge from Taste of Country called the clip romantic and enjoyed the clip's scenery.

A second vertical music video was released to Shelton's YouTube account on April 24, 2020, featuring the original version of "Nobody but You". Selena Barrientos, another writer for Good Housekeeping, praised the new vertical video, calling it intimate and evidence of the two's love for each other. Jim Casey from Nash Country Daily was surprised by the release of another video, writing: "[Shelton and Stefani] are getting a lot of video mileage out of their new duet [...] there was a lyric video, official video, behind-the-scenes video, acoustic video... and now, vertical video." Fans of both Shelton and Stefani also responded favorably to the video clip.

== Live performances ==
Shelton and Stefani performing together live in August 2016

Shelton and Stefani performed "Nobody but You" live at the 62nd Annual Grammy Awards on January 26, 2020. The performance occurred at Staples Center in Downtown Los Angeles towards the beginning of the live broadcast, following a tribute to American basketball player Kobe Bryant by singers Alicia Keys, Lizzo, and Boyz II Men. Shelton was dressed in a navy suit while Stefani wore "an elegant gown adorned in gold and rose detailing." Her outfit also featured a red headband embellished with miniature rosebuds. At the beginning of the performance, Shelton appeared solo on-stage and strummed his guitar while singing; after the first verse, Stefani then joined him. For parts of the song, the couple "held hands and stared into each others' eyes" as they performed. Bianca Gracie from Billboard felt that Shelton and Stefani's performance brought "endless love" to the venue and labeled it as romantic. A snippet of the televised performance was uploaded to The Recording Academy's YouTube channel the following day on January 27.

At the Just a Girl concert residency in Las Vegas, Stefani brought out Shelton and performed "Nobody but You", as a surprise to the audience at her February 19, 2020, concert. The performance began with Shelton exiting an elevator, before joining Stefani on stage. Colley wrote highly of the performance, calling it "an unforgettable concert". On July 20, 2020, Shelton announced that he would be filming a live concert to be played at drive-in theaters throughout the United States. Titled Encore Drive-In Nights, the event occurred on July 25, 2020. Stefani appeared during a segment of the event, opening with her 2005 single "Hollaback Girl" and following with "Nobody but You" with Shelton. Despite providing a negative review of the show, Ed Masley from The Arizona Republic discussed Stefani's appearance and wrote: "that portion of the concert would've killed in an arena".

The couple was scheduled to perform "Nobody but You" during the 55th Academy of Country Music Awards, but due to the COVID-19 pandemic, the ceremony was postponed indefinitely. In place of the show's broadcast on CBS, a two-hour-long special titled ACM Presents: Our Country was shown. During the special program, Shelton and Stefani performed "Nobody but You" via a webcam broadcast at Shelton's Oklahoma residence. The performance was accompanied by a live interview where Shelton jokingly remarked: "We're happy to be [here], hiding away from everybody doing what we're supposed to do: drinking all day!" Lyndsey Havens from Billboard liked their performance and called it loving. It was later announced that the Country Music Awards ceremony was rescheduled to occur on September 16, 2020, and Shelton and Stefani still appeared as guest musical acts; however, they performed their other 2020 single, "Happy Anywhere", instead.

== Track listings ==
- Digital download/streaming
1. "Nobody but You" – 3:15
- Digital download/streaming – Acoustic
1. "Nobody but You" (Acoustic) – 3:18
- Digital download/streaming – Live
1. "Nobody but You" (Live) – 3:31
- Streaming – Live (Spotify EP edition)
1. "Nobody but You" (Live) – 3:31
2. "Nobody but You" – 3:15
3. "Nobody but You" (Acoustic) – 3:18

== Credits and personnel ==
Credits adapted from AllMusic.

- Blake Shelton – vocals
- Gwen Stefani – vocals
- Scott Hendricks – producer, engineer, digital editing
- Ross Copperman – composer
- Tommy Lee James – composer
- Shane McAnally – composer
- Josh Osborne – composer
- Scott Johnson – assistant producer
- Sam Bergeson – engineer, electric guitar, keyboards
- Justin Niebank – audio engineer, mixing engineer, programming
- Kam Luchterhand – assistant engineer
- Andrew Mendelson – mastering engineer
- Brian David Willis – digital editing
- Nir Z – digital editing, percussion
- Ilya Toshinkiy – acoustic guitar, dulcimer
- Jimmie Lee Sloas – bass guitar

== Charts ==
=== Weekly charts ===
Weekly chart performance for "Nobody but You"
Chart (2020)	Peak position
Australia Country (The Music Network)	9
Australia Digital Tracks (ARIA)	31
Canada Hot 100 (Billboard)	38
Canada Country (Billboard)	1
US Billboard Hot 100	18
US Country Airplay (Billboard)	1
US Hot Country Songs (Billboard)	2
US Rolling Stone Top 100	32

=== Year-end charts ===
Year-end chart performance for "Nobody but You"
Chart (2020)	Position
Canada (Canadian Hot 100)	98
US Billboard Hot 100	52
US Country Airplay (Billboard)	2
US Hot Country Songs (Billboard)	5

== Certifications and sales ==
Certifications for "Nobody but You"
Region	Certification	Certified units/sales
Canada (Music Canada)	Platinum	80,000^{‡}
United States (RIAA)	2× Platinum	2,000,000^{‡} / 288,000
^{‡} Sales+streaming figures based on certification alone.

== Release history ==
Release dates and formats for "Nobody but You"
Region	Date	Format(s)	Version	Label	Ref.
United States	December 13, 2019	Digital download; streaming	Original	Warner	
United States	January 21, 2020	Country radio	Original	Warner	
Various	March 20, 2020	Digital download; streaming	Acoustic	Warner	
Various	June 26, 2020	Digital download; streaming	Live	Warner	
United States	June 26, 2020	Streaming (Spotify EP edition)	Live	Warner	

== See also ==
- Billboard Year-End Hot 100 singles of 2020
- List of number-one country singles of 2020 (Canada)
- List of number-one digital songs of 2019 (U.S.)
