= Straight Outta Cold Beer =

Promotional single by Blake Shelton

from the album If I'm Honest
- Released: May 13, 2016
- Recorded: 2016
- Genre: Country
- Length: 2:45
- Label: Warner Bros. Nashville
- Songwriters: Marv Green; Ben Hayslip; Justin Wilson
- Producer: Scott Hendricks

"Straight Outta Cold Beer" is a song recorded by American singer Blake Shelton for his tenth studio album, If I'm Honest (2016). It was released as its third promotional single for digital download on May 13, 2016. The track was written by Marv Green, Ben Hayslip, and Justin Wilson, while production was solely handled by Shelton's longtime producer Scott Hendricks. A country song, Shelton sings about his youth, where everyone partied until the beer was gone.

"Straight Outta Cold Beer" was generally well received by music critics, with the majority enjoying the "party" nature of the recording. One reviewer appreciated Shelton staying true to his "country roots". Within its first two weeks of availability, the track sold a total of 17,000 copies. In the United States, it debuted and peaked at number 23 on Billboard's Country Digital Songs component chart, while also managing to reach the top 40 of the same publication's Hot Country Songs chart.

== Background and composition ==
In 2015, Shelton began working on If I'm Honest, his tenth studio album, which details his personal and romantic life following his divorce from musician Miranda Lambert; despite the majority of the tracks on the album evoking recent events in his life, he wanted to write a song about partying, even though he admitted to not being able to do it as often as he used to. He further discussed his inspiration behind the track to Rolling Stone's Beville Dunkerley:

Basically it’s just about having a throwdown out in the woods — that’s what we used to do in high school. I can’t honestly sit here and say that I do it much anymore, I’m getting too old, but it’s fun for me to sing about those times and the crazy stuff that I used to do, and the crazy stuff that I know somewhere, as we speak right now, kids are doing somewhere in somebody's field. I know you're tearing it up out there.

Warner Bros. Nashville issued "Straight Outta Cold Beer" as the album's third promotional single on May 13, 2016, following "Friends" on April 8 and "Go Ahead and Break My Heart" on May 9. "Straight Outta Cold Beer" also serves as the opener to the record. Shelton explained that he chose the track as an opener because it "represents his carefree mind-set at the start of 2015", before his divorce.

"Straight Outta Cold Beer" was written and composed by Marv Green, Ben Hayslip, and Justin Wilson, while production was solely handled by Shelton's longtime producer Scott Hendricks. According to Consequence of Sound, Shelton sings "about lacking suds" from partying in the lyrics, which Entertainment Weekly's Jim Farber described as "an ode to getting soused". The singer boasts that there is nothing fake about him in the lyrics.

== Reception ==
"Straight Outta Cold Beer" was positively received by music critics, with many of them describing it as a "party" song. Mikael Wood of the Los Angeles Times singled it out for being a "sly party tune" among the other tracks on If I'm Honest. Similarly, Keith Harris from Rolling Stone called it a "rowdy party-starter" and appreciated its word play reference to the 1988 N.W.A album Straight Outta Compton in the title. Entertainment Tonight's Sophie Schillaci declared it a "fun track" that stayed true to the singer's "classic country roots". A staff member from WUSN enjoyed the recording, and claimed it would make anyone more excited for If I'm Honest, which was then unreleased. Regarding the subject matter of "Straight Outta Cold Beer", Stephen Thomas Erlewine from AllMusic found Shelton to be "rais[ing] a little hell". Robyn Collins from Radio.com created a list of the "5 Best Songs on Blake Shelton's If I'm Honest" and included "Straight Outta Cold Beer". She wrote, "this party anthem is another perfect country-boy song that says some of the same things in brand new ways with music that’ll make you have to tap a boot."

For the week ending April 30, 2016, "Straight Outta Cold Beer" debuted at number 36 on the Hot Country Songs chart. Additionally, the single was the week's 23rd best selling digital country song, selling approximately 14,000 copies in its first week of availability. In its second week available as a digital download, an additional 3,000 copies were purchased, increasing its total sales to over 17,000.

== Track listing ==
Digital download
No.	Title	Length
1.	"Straight Outta Cold Beer"	2:45

== Charts ==
Chart (2016)	Peak position
US Country Digital Songs (Billboard)	23
US Hot Country Songs (Billboard)	36
