= Friends (Blake Shelton song) =

Promotional single by Blake Shelton

from the album If I'm Honest and The Angry Birds Movie: Original Motion Picture Soundtrack
- Released: April 8, 2016
- Recorded: 2016
- Genre: Country
- Length: 3:03
- Label: Atlantic; Warner Bros. Nashville
- Songwriters: Blake Shelton; Jessi Alexander
- Producer: Scott Hendricks

"Friends" is a song recorded by American singer Blake Shelton. It was released as the first promotional single from Shelton's tenth studio album, If I'm Honest (2016). It is the theme song to the 2016 animated film The Angry Birds Movie where Shelton provided voice-over for Earl, a cowboy pig. The track was written by both Shelton and Jessi Alexander, who had collaborated before on Shelton's "Drink on It", and "Mine Would Be You".

The song is about two unlikely friends sticking together, despite them being "different as different can be". The song describes how friends may fight, but "in the end [they] are gonna be friends".

The song was issued as a digital download on April 8, 2016. A music video for the song was also released.

== Composition ==
When approached by a producer for The Angry Birds Movie about voicing a character in the film and singing on the soundtrack, Shelton agreed on the condition that he could "have a, stab at actually writing the song for the movie." He and co-writer Jessi Alexander then spent "about a week" writing the song "over voice memos".

== Chart performance ==
After the initial release of "Friends", the song only peaked on one record chart, the US Kid Digital Songs component chart. For the week ending April 30, 2016, it debuted and peaked at number three, before departing the chart an additional four weeks later.

== Charts ==
Chart (2016)	Peak position
US Kid Digital Songs (Billboard)	3
