= Hell Right =

Single by Blake Shelton featuring Trace Adkins

from the album Fully Loaded: God's Country
- Released: August 16, 2019
- Genre: Country rap
- Length: 3:27
- Label: Warner Bros. Nashville
- Songwriter(s): David Garcia; Brett Tyler; Michael Hardy
- Producer(s): Scott Hendricks

Blake Shelton singles chronology
| "Dive Bar" (2019) | "Hell Right" (2019) | "Nobody but You" (2020) |

Trace Adkins singles chronology
| "Still a Soldier" (2017) | "Hell Right" (2019) | "This Old House" (2019) |

"Hell Right" is a song written by David Garcia, Brett Tyler and Michael Hardy, and recorded by American country music artist Blake Shelton, featuring guest vocals from fellow country artist Trace Adkins. It was released on August 16, 2019 as the second single from Shelton's compilation album Fully Loaded: God's Country.

== Background ==
"Hell Right" was written by David Garcia, Brett Tyler, and Hardy, the latter of whom also co-wrote Shelton's previous single, "God's Country". The song was written on May 29, 2019, a few months after "God’s Country" was recorded. Shelton heard the song, and recorded and released it within a month and a half. According to Shelton, the song is about "taking things to the max," and that "you can raise hell or you can raise hell right". The song also takes a jab at Lil Nas X's hit song "Old Town Road" in the line, sung by Shelton, "then the girl from the small town took off the 'Old Town' and put on a little Hank Jr."

"Hell Right" marks the second time that Shelton and Adkins have collaborated on a single release, following 2009's "Hillbilly Bone", which was a Number One hit on the Billboard Hot Country Songs chart.

== Commercial performance ==
"Hell Right" reached a peak of number 18 on the Billboard Country Airplay chart, becoming Shelton's lowest-peaking single and his first to miss the top 10 since 2007's "The More I Drink". It was Adkins' first Top 20 country single since "Just Fishin'" in 2011.

It has sold 97,000 copies in the United States as of January 2020. The song was certified gold by RIAA on February 27, 2020.

== Charts ==
=== Weekly charts ===
Weekly chart performance for "Hell Right"
| Chart (2019–2020) | Peak position |
|---|---|
| Australia Country (The Music Network) | 27 |
| Canada Country (Billboard) | 36 |
| Canada Digital Song Sales (Billboard) | 19 |
| US Billboard Hot 100 | 99 |
| US Country Airplay (Billboard) | 18 |
| US Hot Country Songs (Billboard) | 14 |

=== Year-end charts ===
2019 year-end chart performance for "Hell Right"
| Chart (2019) | Position |
|---|---|
| US Hot Country Songs (Billboard) | 84 |

2020 year-end chart performance for "Hell Right"
| Chart (2020) | Position |
|---|---|
| US Hot Country Songs (Billboard) | 89 |

== Certifications ==
| Region | Certification | Certified units/sales |
|---|---|---|
| Canada (Music Canada) | Gold | 40,000^{‡} |
| United States (RIAA) | Gold | 500,000^{‡} |
^{‡} Sales+streaming figures based on certification alone.
