= I'll Name the Dogs =

Single by Blake Shelton

from the album Texoma Shore
- Released: September 11, 2017
- Genre: Country
- Length: 3:03
- Label: Warner Bros. Nashville
- Songwriters: Matt Dragstrem; Ben Hayslip; Josh Thompson
- Producer: Scott Hendricks

Blake Shelton singles chronology
"Every Time I Hear That Song" (2017)	"I'll Name the Dogs" (2017)	"You Make It Feel Like Christmas" (2017)

Music video
- I'll Name the Dogs on YouTube

"I'll Name the Dogs" is a song by Matt Dragstrem, Ben Hayslip, and Josh Thompson and recorded by American country music artist Blake Shelton. It was released on September 11, 2017, as the first single Shelton's 2017 album Texoma Shore (2017).

== Background and composition ==
"I'll Name the Dogs" was written by Matt Dragstrem, Ben Hayslip and Josh Thompson, while production was handled by Scott Hendricks.

== Commercial performance ==
"I'll Name the Dogs" debuted at No. 23 on the U.S. Billboard Country Airplay chart for the week of September 28, 2017. That same week, the song first entered the Hot Country Songs at No. 40. It became available for sale the following week, and was the second best-selling country song that week with over 27,273 copies sold. This helped the song move up to No. 10 on Hot Country Songs. As of January 2018, "I'll Name the Dogs" has sold 185,000 copies in the United States. The song was certified Gold by the RIAA on July 13, 2018, and Platinum on July 31, 2019, for a million units in sales and streams.

== Charts ==
=== Weekly charts ===
Chart (2017–2018)	Peak position
Canada Hot 100 (Billboard)	78
Canada Country (Billboard)	1
US Billboard Hot 100	56
US Country Airplay (Billboard)	1
US Hot Country Songs (Billboard)	6

=== Year-end charts ===
Chart (2017)	Position
US Hot Country Songs (Billboard)	66

Chart (2018)	Position
US Country Airplay (Billboard)	44
US Hot Country Songs (Billboard)	47

== Certifications ==
Region	Certification	Certified units/sales
Canada (Music Canada)	Platinum	80,000^{‡}
United States (RIAA)	Platinum	1,000,000^{‡} / 185,000
^{‡} Sales+streaming figures based on certification alone.
