= Savior's Shadow =

Single by Blake Shelton

from the album If I'm Honest
- Released: April 8, 2016
- Recorded: 2016
- Genre: Country; gospel
- Length: 2:42
- Label: Warner Bros. Nashville
- Songwriters: Blake Shelton; Jessi Alexander; Jon Randall
- Producer: Scott Hendricks

Blake Shelton singles chronology
"Came Here to Forget" (2016)	"Savior's Shadow" (2016)	"She's Got a Way with Words" (2016)

Music video
- "Savior's Shadow" on YouTube

"Savior's Shadow" is a song recorded by American country music artist Blake Shelton, taken as the second single from his tenth studio album, If I'm Honest (2016). It was released digitally on April 8, 2016, before being sent to Christian and country radio on April 11. The track was written by Shelton, Jessi Alexander and Jon Randall, while production was handled by Scott Hendricks.

A gospel song with Christian themes, "Savior's Shadow" served as a reminder that his faith was strong. Additionally, its lyrics detail losing faith during troubling times in his life, but ultimately result in him gaining more. It was generally well received by music critics, who applauded Shelton's change in musical genre. Some critics even positively noted his maturity through the track. A black and white music video was filmed for the track, and premiered on May 19, 2016. The singer performed it live for the first time on May 26, 2016 for Comic Relief's Red Nose Day 2016 on NBC.

== Background and composition ==
According to Shelton himself, the initial idea for "Savior's Shadow" came to him in his sleep in May 2015. Although the singer did not remember the exact dream, he recalled "four lines of lyrics and [the] melody", which drew him to "grab his smartphone and s[ing] the passage into the memo function before it was lost". He enlisted the help of married couple Jessi Alexander and Jon Randall to complete the track, who were ironically experiencing changes in their lives, much like Shelton. The finalized recording was done at Shelton's private home in Los Angeles, California in his bedroom's closet for "best effect". Alexander claimed that the track "came deep from Blake's soul" and demonstrated that his tenth studio album If I'm Honest would "be extremely personal". She remarked that the writing became more emotional, as the track was finished "just one month after his divorce from Miranda Lambert". When Shelton released the single on April 8, 2016 through Warner Bros. Nashville, he expressed gratitude from his fans, stating: "In all the years I've been doing this I've never experienced this kind of reaction from a song. So proud."

"Savior's Shadow" was written by Shelton, Alexander, and Randall, while production was handled by longtime collaborator Scott Hendricks. It is composed in the key of D major using common time with a tempo of 96-100 beats per minute. His vocal range, which spanned from A3-E5, was accompanied by a piano, in addition to backup vocals. An "introspective" gospel song, it serves as "a guide" to demonstrate his faith "through trying times". The gospel section and string arrangements was imagined by Charlie Judge, while Russ Pahl helped Shelton in creating "bittersweet steel notes" for the production. Shelton sings: "I feel the rain, I hear the thunder / As He cries for me", demonstrating that Jesus was "a powerful source of strength" for the singer. The first verse displays Shelton's "longing and willingness to stand" with Jesus after his relationship struggles: "Though the devil tried to break me / My sweet Jesus won't forsake me / When I'm in my Savior's shadow where I'm supposed to be". Jeff Nelson of People claimed that the single offered some of Shelton's "most revealing lyrics", particularly the aforementioned lines. The song commences with the singer praying: "I'm standing in my Savior's shadow, following his footsteps there / Every mountain, every ocean, He hears my prayer".

== Reception ==
"Savior's Shadow" was well received by music critics. AXS's Lori Melton applauded Shelton for making "a huge creative departure" from his previous work. Keith Harris, writing for Rolling Stone enjoyed the single, and felt "that the good ol' boy's maturing into a man". Scott Stroud from The National appreciated the recording's honesty, in addition to it for containing "emotional sincerity". Entertainment Tonight's Sophie Schillaci declared it a "deeply heartfelt ballad" and lauded its lyrics contrasting the Devil and Jesus. Mikael Wood of the Los Angeles Times was more mixed in his review of the parent album; Wood was not impressed by the lyrics, summarizing that instead of being about religion and Christian faith, they are "mostly familiar images of thunder and rain, mountains and oceans".

For the week ending April 30, 2016, "Savior's Shadow" debuted at the bottom position of the Hot Country Songs chart, peaking at number 50. Additionally, the single was the week's forty-third best selling digital country song, selling approximately 7,000 copies in its first week available, which allowed it to chart at number 43 on the Country Digital Songs, and at number 4 on both the Christian Digital Songs and Christian/Gospel Digital Songs component charts. The single did not appear the following week on the Country Digital Songs chart, but lasted an additional seven weeks on the Christian Digital Songs and Christian/Gospel Digital Songs charts. On the Christian Songs chart, it debuted at number 17, for the week ending April 30, and managed to peak at number 14 two months later, for the week ending June 18.

== Promotion ==
A black-and-white music video for "Savior's Shadow" premiered on May 19, 2016 on Shelton's official YouTube account. For the entirety of the video's duration, it features the singer sitting on a stool and playing the guitar. He sits in front of a solid white background while close-ups of Shelton strumming the guitar occasionally appear. Shelton performed the song live for the first time as part of Comic Relief's Red Nose Day 2016 on May 26, 2016.

== Track listing ==
Digital download
No.	Title	Length
1.	"Savior's Shadow"	2:42

== Credits and personnel ==
Personnel

- Blake Shelton – lead vocals, songwriting
- Jessi Alexander – songwriting
- Scott Hendricks – production
- Charlie Judge – string arrangements
- Russ Pahl – additional instruments
- Jon Randall – songwriting

Credits adapted from the liner notes of If I'm Honest.

== Charts ==
Chart performance for "Savior's Shadow"
Chart (2016)	Peak position
US Hot Christian Songs (Billboard)	14
US Hot Country Songs (Billboard)	50

== Release history ==
Country	Date	Format	Label	Ref.
North America	April 8, 2016	Digital download	Warner Bros. Nashville	
United States	April 11, 2016	Christian radio	Warner Bros. Nashville	
United States	April 11, 2016	Country radio	Warner Bros. Nashville	
