= Every Time I Hear That Song =

Single by Blake Shelton

from the album If I'm Honest
- Released: February 20, 2017
- Genre: Country
- Length: 3:35
- Label: Warner Bros. Nashville
- Songwriters: Aimee Mayo; Chris Lindsey; Brad Warren; Brett Warren
- Producer: Scott Hendricks

Blake Shelton singles chronology
"A Guy with a Girl" (2016)	"Every Time I Hear That Song" (2017)	"I'll Name the Dogs" (2017)

"Every Time I Hear That Song" is a song recorded by American country music artist Blake Shelton for his tenth studio album, If I'm Honest (2016). Released to radio as the album's fifth and final single on February 20, 2017, the track was written by Aimee Mayo, Chris Lindsey, Brad Warren and Brett Warren, while production was handled by Scott Hendricks.

== Background and composition ==
"Every Time I Hear That Song" was written by Aimee Mayo, Chris Lindsey, Brad Warren and Brett Warren, while production was handled by Scott Hendricks. Blake Shelton performed the song at Universal Orlando for the Tonight Show Starring Jimmy Fallon on April 4, 2017.

== Commercial performance ==
"Every Time I Hear That Song" reached No. 1 on the Country Airplay chart dated July 15, 2017, making this Shelton 24th No. 1 song on the chart. The song has sold 146,000 copies in the United States as of July 2017.

== Music video ==
The music video was directed by Kristin Barlowe in Nashville, and features Shelton singing in the rain.

== Charts ==
Chart (2017)	Peak position
Canada Hot 100 (Billboard)	100
Canada Country (Billboard)	2
US Billboard Hot 100	56
US Country Airplay (Billboard)	1
US Hot Country Songs (Billboard)	8

=== Year-end charts ===
Chart (2017)	Position
Canada Country (Billboard)	9
US Country Airplay (Billboard)	31
US Hot Country Songs (Billboard)	27

== Certifications ==
Certifications for Every Time I Hear That Song
Region	Certification	Certified units/sales
United States (RIAA)	Gold	500,000^{‡}
^{‡} Sales+streaming figures based on certification alone.
