= She's Got a Way with Words =

Single by Blake Shelton

from the album If I'm Honest
- Released: June 13, 2016
- Genre: Country
- Length: 3:11
- Label: Warner Bros. Nashville
- Songwriters: Wyatt Earp; Andy Albert; Marc Beeson
- Producer: Scott Hendricks

Blake Shelton singles chronology
"Savior's Shadow" (2016)	"She's Got a Way with Words" (2016)	"A Guy with a Girl" (2016)

"She's Got a Way with Words" is a song recorded by American country music artist Blake Shelton for his tenth studio album If I'm Honest (2016). Released to radio as the album's third single on June 13, 2016, the track was written by Wyatt Earp, Andy Albert and Marc Beeson, while production was handled by Scott Hendricks.

== Content ==
The lyrics of the song detail an unfavorable relationship with an ex-partner, using wordplay such as "She put a big F-U in my future". Because of its lyrics, some fans interpreted the song as being directed towards Miranda Lambert, whom he divorced around the time of the song's release. However, the song had already been pitched to Shelton prior to the divorce. Writers Andy Albert, Marc Beeson, and Wyatt Earp originally pitched the song to Jake Owen, who rejected it as he was also going through a divorce at the time and did not want fans to think the song reflected his opinions about his own relationship. The songwriters then approached Shelton, considering "his sardonic sense of humor" a good fit for the lyrics.

== Critical reception ==
Robert K. Oermann of MusicRow described the song as "very cleverly written".

== Performance ==
The song debuted at number 28 on the Hot Country Songs chart on the release of the album If I'm Honest, selling 26,000 copies for the week. It debuted at number 54 on the Country Airplay chart the following week ahead of its official release to radio. It became the most-added of the song on its official release. Reaching a peak of number 7 on the Billboard Country Airplay chart, "She's Got a Way with Words" became Shelton's first single to miss number one since "I'll Just Hold On" in 2009, ending a streak of seventeen consecutive number one hits for him. The song has sold 284,000 copies in the United States as of October 2016. It was certified Gold by the RIAA on December 9, 2016.

== Music video ==
The music video was directed by Adam Rothlein and premiered in June 2016.

== Charts ==
=== Weekly charts ===
Chart (2016)	Peak position
Canada Hot 100 (Billboard)	76
Canada Country (Billboard)	2
US Billboard Hot 100	61
US Country Airplay (Billboard)	7
US Hot Country Songs (Billboard)	8

=== Year-end charts ===
Chart (2016)	Position
US Hot Country Songs (Billboard)	40

== Certifications ==
Region	Certification	Certified units/sales
Canada (Music Canada)	Gold	40,000^{‡}
United States (RIAA)	Platinum	1,000,000^{‡} / 284,000
^{‡} Sales+streaming figures based on certification alone.
