= Came Here to Forget =

Single by Blake Shelton

from the album If I'm Honest
- Released: March 8, 2016
- Recorded: 2016
- Genre: Country pop
- Length: 3:40
- Label: Warner Bros. Nashville
- Songwriters: Deric Ruttan; Craig Wiseman
- Producer: Scott Hendricks

Blake Shelton singles chronology
"Gonna" (2015)	"Came Here to Forget" (2016)	"Savior's Shadow" (2016)

"Came Here to Forget" is a song recorded by American country music artist Blake Shelton for his tenth studio album, If I'm Honest (2016). Released as the former album's lead single, the song became digitally available on March 8, 2016. The track was written by Craig Wiseman and Deric Ruttan, while production was handled by Scott Hendricks.

== Composition ==
"Came Here to Forget" was written by Craig Wiseman and Deric Ruttan, while production was handled by Scott Hendricks. Shelton that Wiseman "was kind of given the task to write a song for me about what had happened to me in my personal life, and when I first started seeing Gwen. It's all in there. Really, the only difference is we didn't actually meet up at a bar. That would have been kinda hard to keep that on the down low."

== Critical reception ==
Billy Dukes of Taste of Country reviewed the single with favor, praising Shelton's expressive performance as well as progressive style.

== Commercial performance ==
After its release, "Came Here to Forget" received commercial success in the United States and Canada. The song debuted at No. 1 on Country Digital Song chart on its release with 53,000 sold in its first week, becoming Shelton's fourth No. 1 on the chart. It also entered the Hot Country Songs chart at No. 6, his highest debut and 25th top 10 on that chart, and at No. 18 On Country Airplay, which equaled Shelton's 2014 song "Neon Light" as his highest entry to the chart. This became Shelton's 22nd number one hit and also his 17th consecutive hit of his career. The song has sold 506,000 copies in the United States as of August 2016.

== Music video ==
The music video was directed by Trey Fanjoy and premiered in March 2016.

== Charts and certifications ==
=== Charts ===
Chart (2016)	Peak position
Canada Hot 100 (Billboard)	56
Canada Country (Billboard)	1
US Billboard Hot 100	36
US Country Airplay (Billboard)	1
US Hot Country Songs (Billboard)	2

=== Year end charts ===
Chart (2016)	Position
US Country Airplay (Billboard)	39
US Hot Country Songs (Billboard)	9

=== Certifications ===
Region	Certification	Certified units/sales
Canada (Music Canada)	Platinum	80,000^{‡}
United States (RIAA)	Platinum	506,000
^{‡} Sales+streaming figures based on certification alone.
