= A Guy with a Girl =

Single by Blake Shelton

from the album If I'm Honest
- Released: September 26, 2016
- Recorded: 2016
- Genre: Country
- Length: 3:10
- Label: Warner Bros. Nashville
- Songwriters: Ashley Gorley; Bryan Simpson
- Producer: Scott Hendricks

Blake Shelton singles chronology
"She's Got a Way with Words" (2016)	"A Guy with a Girl" (2016)	"Every Time I Hear That Song" (2017)

"A Guy with a Girl" is a song recorded by American country music artist Blake Shelton for his tenth studio album, If I'm Honest (2016). Released to radio as the album's fourth single on September 26, 2016, the track was written by Ashley Gorley and Bryan Simpson, while production was handled by Scott Hendricks.

== Background and composition ==
"A Guy with a Girl" was written by Ashley Gorley and Bryan Simpson, while production was handled by Scott Hendricks. Containing influences from 80s country music, the single is comparable to the recordings on his previous studio albums, particularly Startin' Fires (2008). In the track's lyrics, the singer describes his girlfriend receiving a ton of attention. Shelton sings: "When I walk into a party with you, girl / I'm just a guy with a girl everybody wants to know", and questions: "Wondering how I ever got your little hand in mine / Looking over at you like 'ain't she beautiful'?".

== Critical reception ==
"A Guy with a Girl" was well received by music critics. Raphael Chestang from Entertainment Tonight declared it "one of the most touching tracks from [...] If I'm Honest". Lauren Cowling from One Country praised its sound for being soulful, sexy, and flirty, and concluded with "[it's] a Shelton classic". Chuck Dauphin, a columnist for Sounds Like Nashville, claimed that "A Guy with a Girl", in addition to album tracks "Every Goodbye" and "She's Got a Way with Words", would make veteran country musicians proud.

== Commercial performance ==
The song has sold 200,000 copies in the US as of March 2017.

== Charts ==
Chart (2016–2017)	Peak position
Canada Hot 100 (Billboard)	77
Canada Country (Billboard)	1
US Billboard Hot 100	42
US Country Airplay (Billboard)	1
US Hot Country Songs (Billboard)	3

=== Year-end charts ===
Chart (2017)	Position
Canada Country (Billboard)	33
US Country Airplay (Billboard)	17
US Hot Country Songs (Billboard)	29

== Certifications ==
Certifications for A Guy with a Girl
Region	Certification	Certified units/sales
United States (RIAA)	Platinum	1,000,000^{‡}
^{‡} Sales+streaming figures based on certification alone.
