= Go Ahead and Break My Heart =

2016 song

Promotional single by Blake Shelton featuring Gwen Stefani

from the album If I'm Honest
- Released: May 9, 2016
- Recorded: 2016
- Genre: Country pop
- Length: 4:25
- Label: Warner Bros. Nashville
- Songwriters: Blake Shelton; Gwen Stefani
- Producer: Scott Hendricks

"Go Ahead and Break My Heart" is a song that was written and recorded by American singers Blake Shelton and Gwen Stefani for the former's tenth studio album, If I'm Honest (2016). Shelton's longtime producer Scott Hendricks produced the track. It was released as its second promotional single for digital download on May 9, 2016. The song is Shelton and Stefani's first collaboration. The ideas behind the song began after the pair shared similar insecurities with each other, leaving Shelton to write the first verse, followed by Stefani analyzing it and writing her own.

"Go Ahead and Break My Heart" received generally positive reviews from music critics, with them finding it to be a "strong" choice for If I'm Honest. Several other reviewers appreciated Stefani's contributions to the track. It debuted at number 70 on United States' Billboard Hot 100 and also managed to peak on the Digital Songs component chart in Canada. The recording's release was accompanied by two live performances of the song later that day on both The Voice and at a promotional iHeartRadio concert.

== Background and composition ==
The release of the duet was first announced via Stefani's Twitter account, where she posted the album notes of If I'm Honest, which revealed her name in the track listing. In an interview with People, Shelton expressed that the best part of the duet was "the honest way it came about". He stated: "There's not a third ghost writer, there's not five writers on it. It's just she and I sat down and wrote this song […] and I couldn't be happier about [it]." He further explained that the song was written about "some serious insecurities that we had when we first started down this road with each other"; he called the result "perfect". The concept for "Go Ahead and Break My Heart" was developed by both singers, and began with Shelton writing the first verse, followed by Stefani creating the second, which Shelton described:

She and I sat down and wrote this song about some serious insecurities that we had when we first started down this road with each other, and we both had trust issues. We were getting over it, but we wrote this song about it. And it's perfect. I couldn't be happier about that song and the way it came about and the honest way ... It is like people getting a look at something personal for the first time.

The pair wrote the song, while longtime producer Scott Hendricks handled the production. It portrays a midtempo, country pop crossover duet. Shelton believed that writing his own music had "been a great channel for him to vent and celebrate his tumultuous year". Rolling Stone stated that Shelton and Stefani "[didn't] gush about their relationship in the press too much, as they [tried] to keep some semblance of privacy. Instead, they wrote a song about it." Jim Farber from Entertainment Weekly claimed that "Go Ahead and Break My Heart" served as the parent album's "gossipy framing" for "offer[ing] a simultaneous spit-in-the-face and cri de coeur to their exes". Stephen Thomas Erlewine of AllMusic agreed, finding Shelton "embracing his new lease on life with renewed vigor and a new a love". The lyrics of the recording delve on Stefani's insecurities in a relationship that "will likely have its shares of ups and downs": "I'm so scared, I don't know what to do". Additionally, she explains in the lyrics how the two artists met: "I never ever meant to get so into you / Thought I was using you just to get me through" and "You know I'm broken, I don't trust anymore / Last thing I needed was to fall in love".

== Critical reception ==
Shelton and Stefani performing the song during the latter's This Is What the Truth Feels Like Tour in 2016.

"Go Ahead and Break My Heart" was generally well received by music critics. Janine Schaults from Consequence of Sound enjoyed the track, claiming that the "rousing duet [was] destined for hitsville", with her thanking Stefani for "com[ing] in to save the day" with her "pouty vocals". Erlewine from AllMusic thought the song would qualify as "an adult contemporary hit". Scott Stroud from The National favored it for being "the least subtle" of the "hard-to-miss observations from his high-profile personal life". Mikael Wood, writing for Los Angeles Times, praised the collaboration, stating that Stefani provides "the most striking lyrical moment[s] on If I'm Honest", declaring it a "handsome duet". Jessica Mule from Renowned for Sound selected the recording as "an obvious track choice for the album", and complimented it for "be[ing] quite captivating as they both play off each others own experiences". A reviewer from Sputnikmusic was surprised by the duet, in which he "predict[ed] the song to be one of the weakest on th[e] album"; instead he found it to "be one of the strongest" and claimed Stefani "put forth a solid performance in [...] a surprisingly strong showing for both artists". Idolator's Robbie Daw acclaimed "Go Ahead and Break My Heart", stating that "as far as country-pop crossover duets go [...] we'd rate it just below Jason Aldean and Kelly Clarkson's 'Don't You Wanna Stay'".

== Chart performance ==
"Go Ahead and Break My Heart" received moderate success on the United States' record charts after its release. On the Billboard Hot 100, the single debuted and peaked at number seventy, becoming the week's second highest debut behind Justin Timberlake's "Can't Stop the Feeling!", which topped the chart. The song debuted at position thirteen on the Hot Country Songs component chart, and at number two on the Country Digital Songs chart, selling 58,000 copies in its first week. The track has sold 120,000 copies in America as of June 2016.

== Live performances ==
Shelton and Stefani first performed "Go Ahead and Break My Heart" on the tenth season of The Voice on May 9, 2016. Staff members from Rolling Stone lauded the rendition and stated the couple "heat[ed] up the stage with palpable chemistry [...] without ever losing eye contact". On the same day, they performed the single at a promotional iHeartRadio concert. Another rendition occurred at the 2016 Billboard Music Awards on May 22, 2016. The two sang it additionally at Country Jam in Grand Junction, Colorado, on June 18, 2016, followed by select appearances during Stefani's This Is What the Truth Feels Like Tour (2016).

== Charts ==
Chart performance for "Go Ahead and Break My Heart"
Chart (2016)	Peak position
Canada Digital Songs (Billboard)	17
US Billboard Hot 100	70
US Hot Country Songs (Billboard)	13
