= If I'm Honest =

2016 studio album by Blake Shelton

Studio album by Blake Shelton
- Released: May 20, 2016
- Recorded: 2016
- Genre: Country
- Length: 50:31
- Label: Warner Bros. Nashville
- Producer: Scott Hendricks

Blake Shelton chronology
| Reloaded: 20 No. 1 Hits (2015) | If I'm Honest (2016) | Texoma Shore (2017) |

Singles from If I'm Honest
- 1. "Came Here to Forget" Released: March 8, 2016; 2. "Savior's Shadow" Released: April 8, 2016; 3. "She's Got a Way with Words" Released: June 6, 2016; 4. "A Guy with a Girl" Released: September 26, 2016; 5. "Every Time I Hear That Song" Released: February 20, 2017

If I'm Honest is the tenth studio album by American country music singer Blake Shelton. It was released on May 20, 2016 via Warner Bros. Nashville. The album was produced by Shelton's longtime producer Scott Hendricks and features collaborations with Gwen Stefani and The Oak Ridge Boys.

== Background ==
According to Shelton the album is very personal and addresses his high and lows of 2015 from his divorce from Miranda Lambert in July 2015 and met and started dating Gwen Stefani in November 2015. Shelton said of the album, "I don’t even know how to talk about this album as a piece of music as I do just kind of a timeline. As country artists go, I think we’re supposed to sing about our life experiences, and I’ve done that before, but not to this extent."

Shelton said about the process of choosing an album title, "I was like, I need a title that represents a timeline, like 12, 13 months of my life. Like if somebody just took those months and wrote a story about it, that's what I want the album to represent." What If I Tell the Truth was the album's working title but was changed as it was deemed too similar to Stefani's album This Is What the Truth Feels Like.

== Content ==
One of the album's tracks, "Green", was previously included on Shelton's 2008 album Startin' Fires.

The album's tenth track "Friends", is the theme song to the 2016 film The Angry Birds Movie, which was released on the same day as the album. The song is also featured on its corresponding soundtrack.

Shelton has said that "Every Goodbye" was written with him in mind, explaining, "It’s so dead-on with where my life was when I first started making the record. It’s basically telling you how things got rolling in my personal life again." He said that one of the songwriters told him, "Well you know, we tried to put ourselves in your spot."

== Singles ==
"Came Here to Forget" is the album's first single, and it was released on March 8, 2016. The song debuted at number one on the Country Digital Chart and has sold 136,000 copies as of March 2016.

The second single from the album, "Savior's Shadow", was released on April 8, 2016. This song impacted Christian radio on April 11, 2016 in addition to the country format.

"She's Got a Way with Words" was released on June 6, 2016 as the album's third overall and second promotional single.

"A Guy with a Girl" became the album's fourth single on September 26, 2016.

"Every Time I Hear That Song" was released as the fifth and final single on February 20, 2017.

== Critical reception ==
Professional ratings
Aggregate scores
| Source | Rating |
|---|---|
| Metacritic | 58/100 |
Review scores
| Source | Rating |
| AllMusic | 3/5 stars |
| Consequence of Sound | C |
| Entertainment Weekly | C |
| Knoxville News Sentinel | 3/5 stars |
| Newsday | B+ |
| Rolling Stone | 3/5 stars |

If I'm Honest was met with generally mixed reviews. At Metacritic, which assigns a normalized rating out of 100 to reviews from professional publications, the album received an average score of 58, based on 5 reviews, indicating "mixed or average reviews".

Stephen Thomas Erlewine of AllMusic wrote that the album "is at its core a balladeer's record," and that Shelton pulls off "these romance tunes with a sly, masculine grace that complements the album's sleek modern surfaces." Jim Farber of Entertainment Weekly stated that, "What's more: the album’s breezy Nashville-pop tunes never strike below the surface. Small wonder the toss-off songs seem more credible." Rolling Stone's Keith Harris reported that "Shelton's warmly confident delivery makes those romantic twists and turns sound both lived in but universal".

Glenn Gamboa of Newsday opined that the bulk of the album "is a mix of letting old relationships go and starting new ones." In a review for the Los Angeles Times, Mikael Wood suggests in the home of country music, "the default setting is polished professionalism; rawness actually takes time. And here Shelton seldom pushes beyond that finesse to reach something less smooth." Erik Ernst, writing for Milwaukee Journal Sentinel, opines that "this disc's balance of modern verve, emotional introspection and country inflection is where Shelton is supposed to be." In its review for Consequence of Sound, Janine Schaults commented that "The Country pop star's post-breakup album flounders under too many glitzy, cheesy pop flourishes." Chuck Campbell from the Knoxville News Sentinel said that "Blake Shelton sounds more like a savvy marketer than any kind of artist".

== Commercial performance ==
The album debuted at No. 3 on US Billboard 200 chart, selling 153,000 copies (170,000 album equivalent units) during its first week. It also debuted at No. 1 the Top Country Albums chart. The album was certified Gold by the RIAA on August 23, 2016. It became the eleventh best-selling album of 2016 in the United States with over 522,000 copies sold that year. As of November 2017, the album has sold 627,300 copies in the U.S.

== Track listing ==
If I'm Honest track listing
| No. | Title | Writer(s) | Length |
|---|---|---|---|
| 1. | "Straight Outta Cold Beer" | Marv Green; Ben Hayslip; Justin Wilson | 2:45 |
| 2. | "She's Got a Way with Words" | Wyatt Earp; Andy Albert; Marc Beeson | 3:11 |
| 3. | "Bet You Still Think About Me" | Park Chisolm; Mark Irwin | 3:55 |
| 4. | "Every Time I Hear That Song" | Aimee Mayo; Chris Lindsey; Brad Warren; Brett Warren | 3:35 |
| 5. | "Came Here to Forget" | Deric Ruttan; Craig Wiseman | 3:40 |
| 6. | "Every Goodbye" | Ryan Hurd; busbee; Liz Rose | 3:10 |
| 7. | "It Ain't Easy" | Matt Dragstrem; Hayslip; Rhett Akins | 3:31 |
| 8. | "A Guy with a Girl" | Ashley Gorley; Bryan Simpson | 3:10 |
| 9. | "Go Ahead and Break My Heart" (featuring Gwen Stefani) | Blake Shelton; Gwen Stefani | 4:25 |
| 10. | "Friends" (from The Angry Birds Movie) | Shelton; Jessi Alexander | 3:03 |
| 11. | "One Night Girl" | Gorley; Dallas Davidson | 3:41 |
| 12. | "Doing It to Country Songs" (featuring The Oak Ridge Boys) | Jacob Lyda; Paul Overstreet; Marty Dodson | 3:02 |
| 13. | "Green" | George Teren; Wiseman | 3:11 |
| 14. | "You Can't Make This Up" | Gorley; Zach Crowell; Rodney Clawson | 3:30 |
| 15. | "Savior's Shadow" | Shelton; Alexander; Jon Randall | 2:45 |
| Total length: | | | 50:31 |

== Personnel ==
Credits adapted from the liner notes of the standard edition of If I'm Honest.

- Blake Shelton – lead vocals
- Roy Agee – trombone
- Duane Allen – background vocals
- Hari Bernstein – viola
- Jessica Blackwell – violin
- Joe Bonsall – background vocals
- Tom Bukovac – electric guitar
- Perry Coleman – background vocals
- Paul DiGiovanni – programming
- Charles Dixon – cello
- Paul Franklin – pedal steel guitar
- William Lee Golden – background vocals
- Aubrey Haynie – fiddle, mandolin
- Steve Herrmann – trumpet
- Wes Hightower – background vocals
- Jim Horn – saxophone
- Charlie Judge – string arrangements, synthesizer
- Troy Lancaster – electric guitar
- Tony Lucido – bass guitar
- Gordon Mote – Hammond B-3 organ, keyboards, piano
- Emily Nelson – cello
- Russ Pahl – pedal steel guitar
- Jimmie Lee Sloas – bass guitar
- Gwen Stefani – guest vocals
- Richard Sterban – background vocals
- Bryan Sutton – acoustic guitar
- Ilya Toshinsky – acoustic guitar
- Derek Wells – acoustic guitar, electro-acoustic guitar
- Nir Z. – drums, percussion, programming

== Charts ==
=== Weekly charts ===
Weekly chart performance for If I'm Honest
| Chart (2016) | Peak position |
|---|---|
| Australian Albums (ARIA) | 13 |
| Australian Country Albums (ARIA) | 2 |
| Canadian Albums (Billboard) | 3 |
| New Zealand Albums (RMNZ) | 21 |
| US Billboard 200 | 3 |
| US Top Country Albums (Billboard) | 1 |

=== Year-end charts ===
2016 year-end chart performance for If I'm Honest
| Chart (2016) | Position |
|---|---|
| US Billboard 200 | 41 |
| US Top Country Albums (Billboard) | 3 |

2017 year-end chart performance for If I'm Honest
| Chart (2017) | Position |
|---|---|
| US Billboard 200 | 129 |
| US Top Country Albums (Billboard) | 19 |

== Certifications ==
Certifications for If I'm Honest
| Region | Certification | Certified units/sales |
|---|---|---|
| Canada (Music Canada) | Gold | 40,000^{‡} |
| United States (RIAA) | Platinum | 1,000,000^{‡} |
^{‡} Sales+streaming figures based on certification alone.

== Release history ==
List of release dates, showing region, formats, label, editions, catalog number and reference
| Region | Date | Format(s) | Label | Edition(s) | Catalog number | Ref. |
|---|---|---|---|---|---|---|
| United States | May 20, 2016 | CD; digital download | Warner Bros. Nashville | Standard | | |
