= Blake Shelton =

American country singer (born 1976)

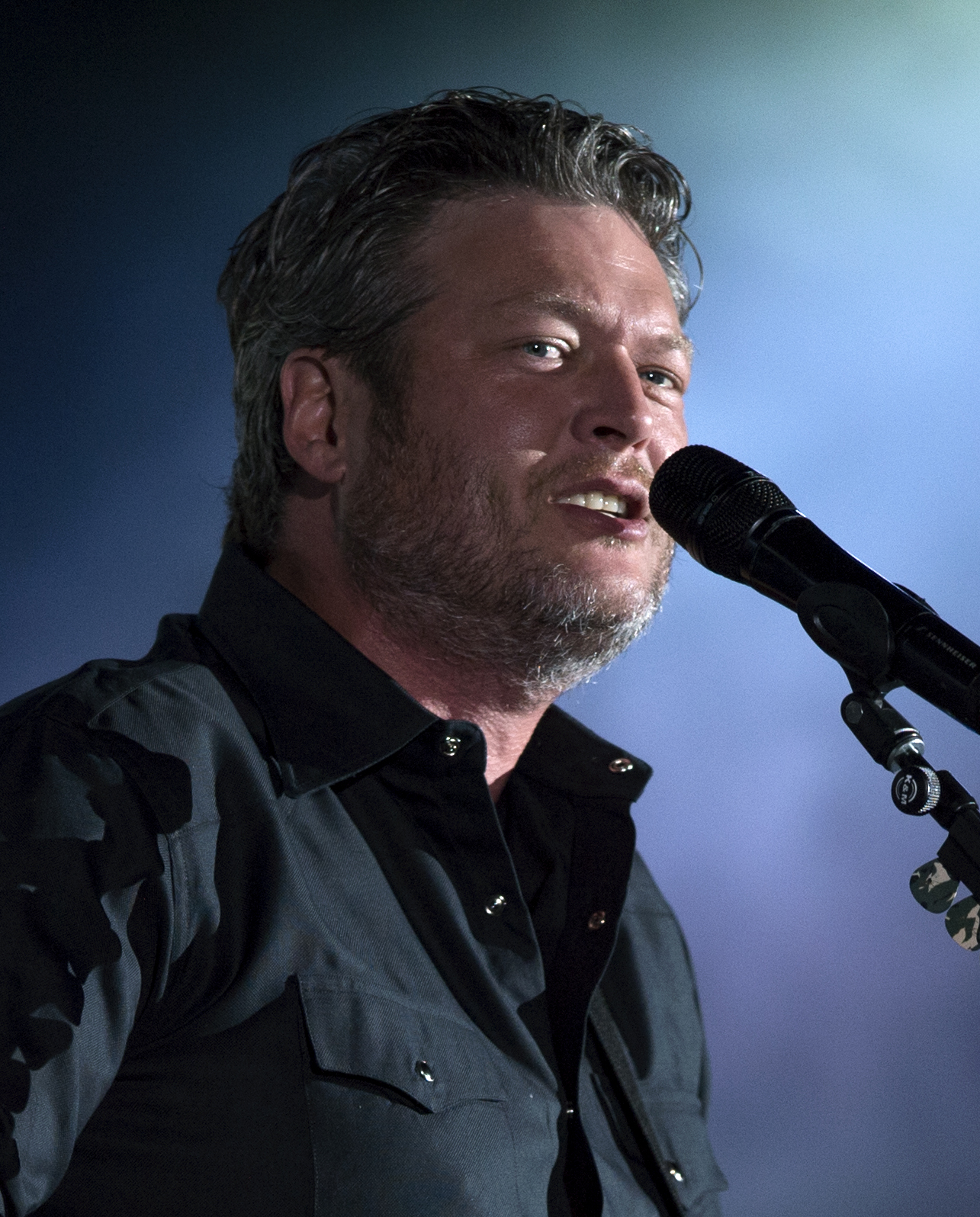
- Shelton in 2017
- Born: Blake Tollison Shelton; June 18, 1976 (age 50); Ada, Oklahoma, U.S.
- Occupations: Singer; songwriter; television personality
- Years active: 2001–present
- Spouses: Kaynette Gern (m. 2003; div. 2006) Miranda Lambert (m. 2011; div. 2015) Gwen Stefani (m. 2021)
- Musical career
- Origin: Nashville, Tennessee, U.S.
- Genre: Country
- Instruments: Vocals; guitar
- Works: Full list
- Labels: Giant; Warner Music Nashville; Reprise Nashville; Ten Point; BBR; Wheelhouse
- Website: blakeshelton.com

Blake Tollison Shelton (born June 18, 1976) is an American singer, songwriter, and television personality. In 2001, he made his debut with the single "Austin" from his self-titled debut album. "Austin" spent five weeks at number one on the Billboard Hot Country Songs chart. The now platinum-certified debut album also produced two more top-20 entries ("All Over Me" and "Ol' Red").

His second and third albums, 2003's The Dreamer and 2004's Blake Shelton's Barn & Grill, are gold and platinum, respectively. His fourth album, Pure BS (2007), was reissued in 2008 with a cover of Michael Bublé's pop hit "Home" as one of the bonus tracks. His fifth album, Startin' Fires was released in November 2008. It was followed by the extended plays Hillbilly Bone and All About Tonight in 2010 and the albums Red River Blue in 2011, Based on a True Story... in 2013, Bringing Back the Sunshine in 2014, If I'm Honest in 2016, Texoma Shore in 2017, Fully Loaded: God's Country in 2019, Body Language in 2021, and his latest album For Recreational Use Only in 2025.

As of December 2020, Shelton has charted 41 singles, including 30 number ones, 17 of which were consecutive. The 11th number one ("Doin' What She Likes") broke "the record for the most consecutive number-one singles in the Country Airplay chart's 24-year history". Throughout his career, he has received nine Grammy Award nominations, including two for Best Country Album. In 2024, Shelton left Warner Music Nashville and signed with BBR Music Group.

Shelton has been a judge on the televised singing competitions Nashville Star and Clash of the Choirs, and a coach on NBC's The Voice. He was on The Voice from 2011 to 2023, and in 9 of 23 seasons (2–4, 7, 11, 13, 18, 20, and 22), a member of his team won.

== Early life ==
Blake Tollison Shelton was born on June 18, 1976, in Ada, Oklahoma, to Dorothy Ann (née Byrd), a beauty salon owner, and Richard Lee "Dick" Shelton, a car salesman. Shelton began singing at an early age and by the age of 12, he was taught how to play the guitar by his uncle. By age 15, he had written his first song. By age 16, he had received a Denbo Diamond Award in his home state. On November 13, 1990, his older brother, Richie Shelton died in an automobile accident at the age of 24.

After graduating from high school at 17, he moved to Nashville, Tennessee, to pursue a singing career. There, he got a job at a music publishing company, and, in 1997, he was aided by Bobby Braddock to obtain a production contract with Sony Music.

== Music career ==
=== 2001–2006: Beginnings ===
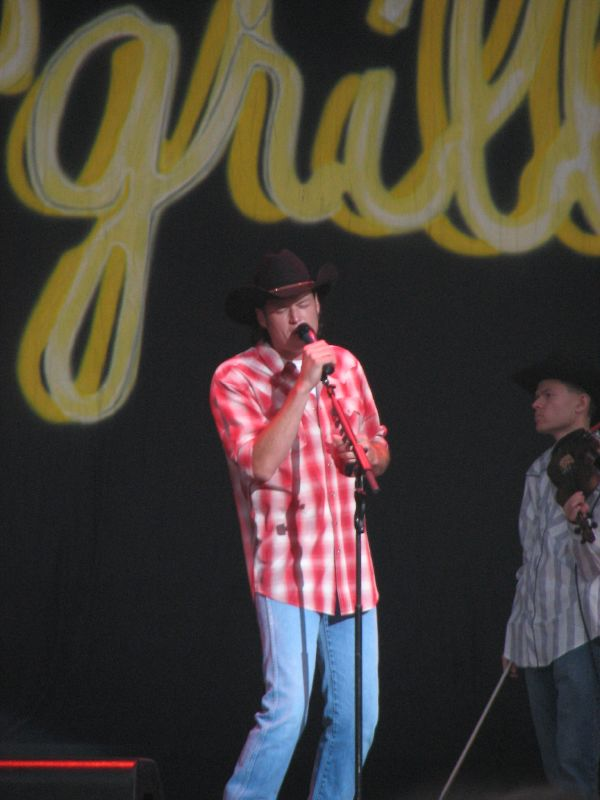
Shelton performing at the Crawford County Fair in Meadville, Pennsylvania, in August 2005

Some years later in Nashville, he signed to Giant Records. In 2001, he was slated to release a song entitled "I Wanna Talk About Me" as a single, but the staff at the label considered the song unsuitable for a lead-off single, and the song was eventually recorded by Toby Keith, whose version was a number-one single.

Instead, Giant released "Austin" as Shelton's debut single. Shortly after that song was released, Giant Records was closed, and Shelton was transferred to parent company Warner Bros. Records. "Austin" became Shelton's first number-one hit on the Billboard Hot Country Singles and Tracks (now Hot Country Songs) charts and spent five weeks at that position. Warner released Shelton's self-titled debut album, which was produced by songwriter Bobby Braddock. It also produced the top-20 hits "All Over Me", which Shelton co-wrote with Earl Thomas Conley and Mike Pyle, and "Ol' Red". Although Shelton's rendition of "Ol' Red" was not a major radio hit, he considers it his signature song, and it has become popular in concert. The album received a platinum certification from the Recording Industry Association of America for shipments of 1,000,000 copies.

The album received a positive review from Maria Konicki Dinoia of Allmusic, who called "Austin" "tremendously imaginative" and praised Shelton for including songs written by Braddock and Conley. Country Standard Time was less favorable, with Scott Homewood saying that the "album just smacks of being assembled with the intent on capturing the burgeoning alternative country market".

Shelton's second album, The Dreamer, was first released on February 4, 2003, on Warner Bros. Records. Its lead-off single, "The Baby", reached number one on the country charts, holding that position for three weeks. Although the second and third singles ("Heavy Liftin'" and "Playboys of the Southwestern World", respectively) only reached number 32 and number 24, The Dreamer earned gold certification, as well. He, along with Andy Griggs and Montgomery Gentry, sang guest vocals on Tracy Byrd's mid-2003 single "The Truth About Men". Blake Shelton's Barn & Grill was the title of Shelton's third studio album, released in 2004. Its lead-off single, the Harley Allen co-written "When Somebody Knows You That Well", peaked at number 37 on the country charts, while the follow-up "Some Beach" became his third number-one hit, holding that position for four weeks. It was followed by a cover of Conway Twitty's 1988 single "Goodbye Time". Both this cover and its follow-up, "Nobody but Me", reached top 10 for Shelton, as well. As with his first album, Blake Shelton's Barn & Grill was certified platinum. Accompanying the album's release was a video collection entitled Blake Shelton's Barn & Grill: A Video Collection.

On December 18, 2005, several of Shelton's songs, including "Nobody but Me", appeared on the TV movie The Christmas Blessing, starring Neil Patrick Harris, Rebecca Gayheart, Angus T. Jones, and Rob Lowe. Shelton had a small role at the end of the movie, playing himself at a benefit concert, singing "Nobody but Me".

=== 2006–2011: Pure BS and Startin' Fires ===
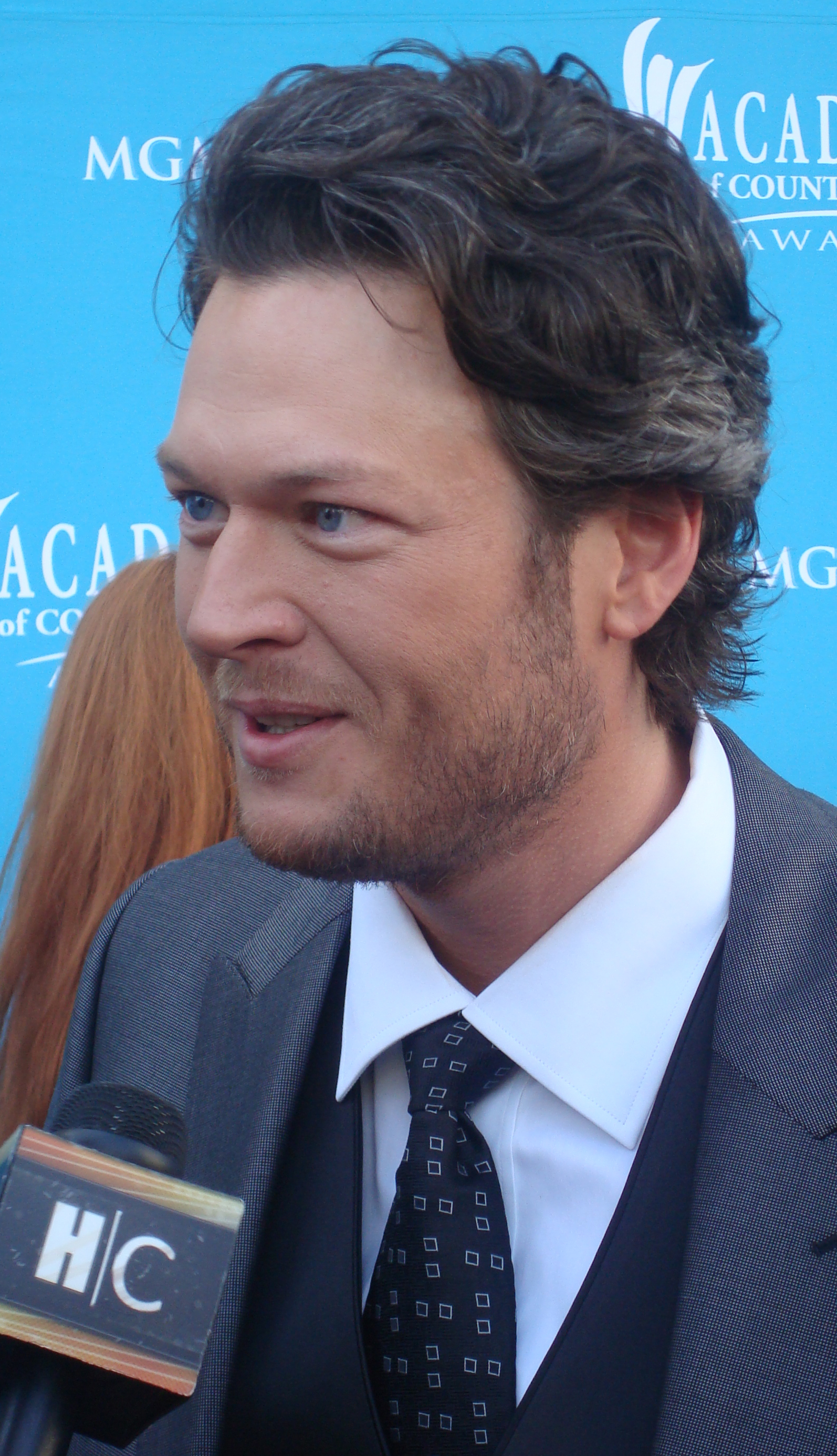
Shelton at the 45th Annual Academy of Country Music Awards

Shelton released his fourth studio album, Pure BS, in early 2007. Unlike with his first three albums, which were produced entirely by Bobby Braddock, Shelton worked with Braddock, Brent Rowan, and Paul Worley as producers for this album. Its first two singles—"Don't Make Me" and "The More I Drink"—were both top-20 hits on the country charts, respectively reaching number 12 and number 19. Also in late 2007, Shelton made appearances on television shows, first as a judge on the talent competition Nashville Star, and later on Clash of the Choirs.

Pure BS was re-released in 2008 with three bonus tracks, including a cover of Michael Bublé's hit single "Home". This cover, released in early 2008 as the album's third single, became his fourth number-one hit in July.

"Home" was followed in August 2008 by the single "She Wouldn't Be Gone", his 14th chart entry and his fifth number-one hit. It was the first time in his career that he had two consecutive number ones. "She Wouldn't Be Gone" is the lead-off to Shelton's fifth studio album, Startin' Fires, which has also produced the single "I'll Just Hold On". This album also includes "Bare Skin Rug", a duet with Lambert. It was produced by Scott Hendricks, except for one track, which was produced by Brent Rowan, and another ("I Don't Care", which carried over from Pure BS) was produced by Braddock. After "I'll Just Hold On" fell off the chart in October 2009, Shelton released a duet with Trace Adkins titled "Hillbilly Bone". It was the lead single on Shelton's EP, Hillbilly Bone, released on March 2, 2010, through Reprise Records Nashville. After "Hillbilly Bone" reached number one in February, All About Tonight, the lead-off single to his EP of the same name, was released. In September, he released the second single from All About Tonight, "Who Are You When I'm Not Looking", his 18th single release. He released his first greatest-hits album, Loaded: The Best of Blake Shelton in November 2010.

Shelton was invited to join the Grand Ole Opry during the September 28, 2010, "Country Comes Home" concert celebrating reopening of the Grand Ole Opry House after the Cumberland River flooded the Opry House in May 2010. The formal invitation was extended on his Twitter account and was announced by Opry star Trace Adkins. He was formally inducted by Adkins at the October 23, 2010, Grand Ole Opry performance. Shelton recorded the title track for the remake of Footloose released on October 14, 2011. Shelton appeared on the 44th Annual Country Music Awards on November 10, 2010, where he performed "All About Tonight" and won Male Vocalist of the Year.

=== 2011–2012: The Voice and Red River Blue ===
Shelton released the album Red River Blue on July 12, 2011, led by the single, "Honey Bee". The song received 138,000 downloads in its first week and was certified gold in its seventh week, setting a record for the fastest gold certification by a male country singer. On June 13, 2011, in its 10th chart week, "Honey Bee" went to number one on the Hot Country Songs chart, becoming his ninth and his fastest-climbing one. The album debuted at number one on the Billboard 200 with around 116,000 copies sold. "God Gave Me You", a cover of a Dave Barnes song, was the album's second single; it also reached number one. "Drink on It", the fifth song on the album, hit number one in April 2012, giving him his 11th such song. On April 30, 2012, Shelton performed "Over" on the semifinals of the second season of The Voice. "Over" became Shelton's seventh consecutive number one and his 12th to date.

In 2011, Shelton became a coach on the NBC show The Voice. In season one, his finalist Dia Frampton came in second. Frampton recorded a track with Shelton titled "I Will" on her album Red, released December 6, 2011. Shelton returned for a second season of the show with his finalist Jermaine Paul as the champion. In season three of The Voice, Shelton's team member, Cassadee Pope, was declared the winner with other Team Blake contestant Terry McDermott finishing as runner-up.

Shelton took the stage with Miranda Lambert at Super Bowl XLVI in February 2012 to open the event, singing a duet version of "America the Beautiful". It marked their first TV performance since their May 2011 wedding. In October 2012, Shelton released his first Christmas album, Cheers, It's Christmas, which peaked at numbers one and two, respectively on the Top Holiday Albums and Top Country Albums charts. Shelton appears on fellow Voice coach Christina Aguilera's album Lotus on the song "Just a Fool".

=== 2013–2014: Based on a True Story... ===
Shortly after midnight on New Year's Day 2013, Shelton premiered a new single entitled "Sure Be Cool If You Did", which was released to iTunes on January 8 and reached number one on the Billboard Hot Country Songs and Country Airplay chart in 2013. His eighth studio album, Based on a True Story..., was released on March 26, 2013, and debuted at number one on the country chart and number three on the all-genre chart by selling a career-best nearly 200,000 copies. The album's second single, "Boys 'Round Here", released to country radio in 2013 and also reached number one on the Country Airplay chart. The album's third single, "Mine Would Be You", was released to country radio on July 22, 2013, and reached number one on the Country Airplay chart in November 2013. "Mine Would Be You" became Shelton's tenth consecutive number-one single, tying him with the record set by Brad Paisley in 2009. With the release of the album's fourth single, "Doin' What She Likes", Shelton achieved his 11th consecutive number-one single, thus breaking the tie.

Shelton received the Gene Weed Special Achievement Award for his role as a coach on The Voice at the 48th Academy of Country Music Awards in 2013. Shelton supported Based on a True Story... on his Ten Times Crazier Tour, which began on July 19, 2013, and ended on October 5, 2013. Shelton has continued the tour into 2014 and 2015. On season four of The Voice, he became the winning coach for the third consecutive time with team members Danielle Bradbery as the winner and the Swon Brothers in third place.

=== 2014–2016: Bringing Back the Sunshine ===
In August 2014, Shelton announced that his ninth studio album, Bringing Back the Sunshine, would be released on September 30, 2014. The album contains the singles "Neon Light", "Lonely Tonight" (a duet with fellow country singer Ashley Monroe), "Sangria", and "Gonna". All four singles have reached number one on the Country Airplay chart. On November 13, 2014, Shelton was inducted into the Oklahoma Hall of Fame for his achievements in the music industry and for the generous work he has done for his home state. Shelton later called the recognition "unbelievable" and "an honor".

In season seven of The Voice, Craig Wayne Boyd was crowned the winner, scoring Shelton his record fourth victory. Shelton recorded a cover of Bob Dylan's 1974 hit "Forever Young" for the soundtrack of Max, which was released in the US on June 26, 2015. Shelton's second greatest-hits album, Reloaded: 20 Number 1 Hits, was released on October 23, 2015.

=== 2016–2018: If I'm Honest and Texoma Shore ===
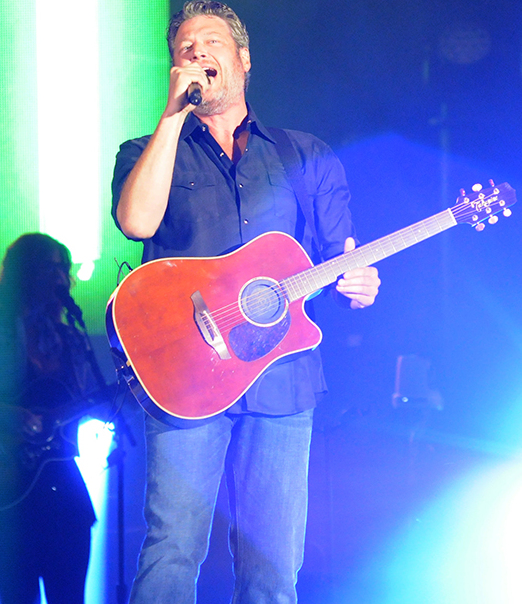
Shelton at the 2017 Warrior Games opening ceremony

Shelton's 10th studio album, If I'm Honest, was released in May 2016. The album's first single "Came Here to Forget" was released to country radio on March 8, 2016. On November 9, 2015, Nickelodeon announced that Shelton would be the host of the 2016 Kids' Choice Awards. On April 8, 2016, a second single from the album, "Savior's Shadow", was released. It was released to Christian radio on April 12, 2016. In June 2016, Shelton released "She's Got a Way with Words" as the album's third overall single and second promoted country single. The song peaked at number seven on the Country Airplay chart, ending Shelton's streak of 17 consecutive number-one singles. "A Guy with a Girl", the album's fourth single, and third promoted country single, reached the top of the charts in early January, earning Shelton his 23rd career chart-topper.

The album's 10th track "Friends" is the theme song of The Angry Birds Movie, which was released in the US on May 20, 2016. Shelton also voices the character of Earl, a cowboy pig.

In June 2016, Shelton celebrated the grand opening of his exhibit at the Country Music Hall of Fame and Museum. The exhibit, titled "Blake Shelton: Based on a True Story", traces Shelton's career path and achievements, encompassing his humble beginnings in Oklahoma, his Nashville origins, and his eventual path toward mainstream success and recognition through his role as a coach on The Voice.

In September 2016, Shelton was selected as one of 30 artists to perform on "Forever Country", a mash-up track of "Take Me Home, Country Roads", "On the Road Again", and "I Will Always Love You" celebrating 50 years of the CMA Awards. The single debuted at number one on Billboard's Hot Country Songs. In season 11 of The Voice, Sundance Head was crowned the winner, giving Shelton his record-extending fifth victory on the show.

In March 2017, Shelton's wax figure was unveiled for Madame Tussauds Nashville and in April Shelton was honored at the Oklahoma Creativity Ambassadors Gala, being one of eight recipients to receive the Creativity Ambassador medallion. In season 13 of The Voice, Chloe Kohanski, who was originally on Miley Cyrus's team, was crowned the winner, giving Shelton his record-extending sixth victory on the show. On September 11, 2017, Shelton released "I'll Name the Dogs" as the lead-off single from his 11th studio album. The album, Texoma Shore, was released on November 3, 2017. The album's second single, "I Lived It", released to country radio on January 29, 2018.

=== 2019–2023: Fully Loaded: God's Country and Body Language ===
In 2019, Shelton released a compilation album titled Fully Loaded: God's Country. The album was preceded by the single "God's Country", which peaked at number one on Hot Country Songs in mid-2019. Also released from the album was "Hell Right", a second duet with Adkins, as well as "Nobody but You", a collaboration with partner Gwen Stefani.

In 2020, Todd Tilghman was announced the winner for the 18th season of The Voice, giving Shelton his seventh victory in the series. In 2021, season 20, his finalist Cam Anthony was named the winner, securing Shelton his eighth win as coach.

Shelton released his 12th studio album, Body Language, on May 21, 2021. The album's release was preceded by the singles "Happy Anywhere" and "Minimum Wage". On September 7, 2022, Shelton announced his 18-date Back to the Honky Tonk Tour. Carly Pearce and Jackson Dean were to join Shelton as opening acts for the tour.

On October 4, 2022, Shelton sold the ownership of his commercially released master recordings from 2001–2019 to Influence Media Partners.

In December 2022, on season 22 of The Voice, his finalist Bryce Leatherwood was named the winner, securing Shelton his ninth and final win as coach before he retired from the show after the following season.

=== 2024–present: New music and label change ===
Shelton appears on wife Gwen Stefani's song, "Purple Irises", which was released in February 2024. In June 2024, Shelton appeared on Post Malone's album F-1 Trillion on the song "Pour Me a Drink".

After being with Warner Music Nashville since the beginning of his career, in September 2024, Shelton signed with BMG/BBR Music Group and Wheelhouse Records. On November 15, 2024, Shelton released a new single, "Texas". In March 2025, Shelton announced his 13th album, For Recreational Use Only, which was released on May 9, 2025, and featured two promotional singles, "Let Him in Anyway" and "Stay Country or Die Tryin'", the latter of which was released as the album's second single and became Shelton's 30th number one country single in January 2026, giving him the second most number one country singles on that chart behind Kenny Chesney's 33. "Let Him in Anyway" was released as the album's third single in February 2026.

== Other ventures ==
Shelton is a partner, along with Ryman Hospitality Properties (the owners of the Grand Ole Opry), in a small chain of restaurants and entertainment complexes called Ole Red. The first Ole Red opened in Shelton's hometown of Tishomingo, Oklahoma, in September 2017. A Nashville location opened in May 2018. A third location in Gatlinburg opened in March 2019. A fourth location in Orlando, Florida, opened in May 2020. A smaller location opened inside Nashville International Airport in 2022, and a sixth location opened on the Las Vegas Strip in 2024.

== Legacy ==
The New York Times described Shelton as "the most important and visible ambassador from Nashville to the American mainstream". Rolling Stone referred to him as "one of country music's biggest stars over the past decade."

In Backstory: Blake Shelton, a GAC television special broadcast in 2012, country stars Miranda Lambert stated she "respect[s] him so much as a vocalist", while Trace Adkins said he "is going to be as relevant in this business as he wants to be for as long as he wants to be." Country Music Hall of Fame member Brenda Lee has commended both his vocals and songwriting. Singer-songwriter Sheryl Crow credits Shelton with inspiring her musically.

Shelton was inducted into the Oklahoma Hall of Fame in 2014, and made a member of the Grand Ole Opry in 2010.

== Achievements ==
Shelton has been the recipient of 10 Country Music Association Awards, six Academy of Country Music Awards, one CMT Artist of the Year award, and 10 CMT Music Awards. He has also received eight American Country Awards, seven People's Choice Awards, three American Music Awards, one Billboard Music Award, and one iHeartRadio Music Award, among others. Shelton has won 27 BMI awards and 27 ASCAP awards. He was inducted into the Grand Ole Opry in 2010, for his many accomplishments in country music, and into the Oklahoma Hall of Fame in 2014, attaining the highest honor one can receive from the state. In April 2013, Shelton was awarded the prestigious Gene Weed Special Achievement Award from the Academy of Country Music for his unprecedented, unique and outstanding individual achievement in country music and television. For his work on The Voice as a television personality, Shelton received the NATPE Reality Breakthrough Award for Best Reality Personality in 2017. Shelton has garnered nine Grammy nominations throughout his career, including nominations for Best Country Album, Best Country Solo Performance, and Best Music Film.

As one of the most successful country artists today, Shelton has sold over 10 million records worldwide, and as of 2017, has sold in excess of 30 million singles, while having generated a total of 1.7 billion streams worldwide. Shelton has also amassed a tremendous commercial impact on the country music industry. His debut single "Austin", off his 2001 Platinum-selling self-titled album, tied the record set by Billy Ray Cyrus in 1992, staying atop the country charts for five weeks, and setting the mark for an artist's debut single in the Broadcast Data Systems era. The success of "Austin" also led Shelton to claim the No. 1 position on both Billboard's Hot Country Singles & Tracks chart and Top Country Singles Sales chart, making him the first debut male country artist to own the top spot on both charts simultaneously. Later, in 2010, Shelton's first single, "Honey Bee", from his sixth studio album Red River Blue, set a new record for the most first-week downloads by a male country singer. As a result of the downloads, the song debuted at number thirteen on the Billboard Hot 100 chart dated for the week ending April 23, 2011. This entry made Shelton the highest-debuting male country artist on the Hot 100 since Garth Brooks (recording as Chris Gaines) debuted at number five in September 1999. As a result of the song's massive commercial success, Shelton also claimed the record for the fastest rising single ever to sell over 500,000 digital copies by a male country soloist. In 2013, Shelton's eighth album, Based on a True Story..., spawned the hit "Doin' What She Likes", which broke the record previously set by Brad Paisley in 2009 for the most consecutive No. 1 singles in the Country Airplay chart's 24-year history, since it was first tracked by Nielsen Broadcast Data Systems in January 1990. In 2016, "Came Here to Forget", the lead-off single from Shelton's tenth studio album If I'm Honest, extended this streak into a record-breaking 17 consecutive number-one singles, leading him to surpass Earl Thomas Conley's record of 16 consecutive number-one singles. As of 2017, Shelton remains one of only five country artists to have achieved No. 1 status on the Billboard Artist 100 chart, having charted all 156 weeks the chart has existed. The CMA Awards recognized Shelton, in addition to George Strait and Vince Gill, as the record holders for the most Male Vocalist of the Year wins, as all three have each garnered five victories. In January 2017, he became the first country artist to win People's Choice Awards' Favorite Album. During the ceremony, Shelton also took home the trophy for Favorite Male Country Artist, marking his second consecutive win in the category. On November 6, 2017, he made Country Aircheck history when he became the first artist to chart six songs simultaneously, from his album Texoma Shore.

On November 14, 2017, Shelton became the first country artist to be named People Magazine's Sexiest Man Alive, and is the second musician to receive the honor (the first being fellow The Voice coach Adam Levine). In 2016, Billboard released their list of "Greatest of All Time Country Artists" and recognized Shelton on the chart, ranking him at No. 50. Shelton also charted on Billboard's list of "Greatest of All Time Country Albums" and "Greatest of All Time Country Songs" with Based on a True Story... taking the position of No. 51 on the chart and "God Gave Me You" ranking at No. 80 on the chart, respectively.

In 2019, Billboard released their list of decade-end "Top Country Albums" and recognized Shelton on the chart, ranking him at No. 14 for Based on a True Story..., No. 24 for Reloaded: 20#1 Hits, No. 49 for If I'm Honest, and No. 50 for Red River Blue. Shelton also charted on Billboard's decade-end list of "Top Country Songs" with "God Gave Me You" ranking at No. 19 on the chart, "Honey Bee" ranking at No. 23, and "God's Country" taking the position of No. 26 on the chart. Shelton also charted on Billboard's decade-end list of "Top Billboard 200 Albums" with Based on a True Story... ranking at No. 51. Shelton ended 2019 on the Hot Country Songs chart with 52 entries, the most of any country artist this decade. At the 2020 CMT Music Awards, he won for best collaborative video for his duet "Nobody But You" with Gwen Stefani.

== Personal life ==
Shelton married his longtime girlfriend Kaynette Gern on November 17, 2003. They divorced in 2006.

In 2005, Shelton met singer Miranda Lambert at the CMT's 100 Greatest Duets Concert. Lambert also sang background vocals on his cover of Michael Bublé's song, "Home", which became a number-one single on the Hot Country Songs chart. On May 9, 2010, after dating for four years, Shelton proposed to Lambert. Shelton and Lambert were married on May 14, 2011, in Boerne, Texas.

On January 17, 2012, Shelton's father, Dick, 71, died in Oklahoma, following a period of declining health. Shelton's brother, Richie, died in 1990 as a result of a car crash when Blake was 14 years old. Blake and Lambert wrote about Richie in Lambert's song, "Over You". The song was named CMA Song of the Year for 2012. It was also named Single Record and Song of the Year at the 2013 Academy of Country Music Awards.

On July 20, 2015, Shelton and Lambert announced their divorce. The couple released a statement, "This is not the future we envisioned and it is with heavy heart that we move forward separately. We are real people, with real lives, with real family, friends and colleagues. Therefore, we kindly ask for privacy and compassion concerning this very personal matter." Their divorce was finalized later that same day.

In late 2015, it was announced that Shelton had started dating his colleague from The Voice, singer Gwen Stefani. Shelton said Stefani and he first bonded over their ongoing divorces in the summer of 2015 as they filmed the ninth season of The Voice, stating: "Gwen saved my life. Who else on earth could understand going through a high-profile divorce from another musician? You can't even imagine the similarities in our divorces."

Stefani and Shelton have collaborated on music numerous times since becoming a couple. In 2015, the musicians co-wrote the song "Go Ahead and Break My Heart" as they navigated the beginning of their relationship. The duet was featured on Shelton's 2016 album, If I'm Honest. In 2020, their duets "Nobody But You" and "Happy Anywhere" both reached number one on the Billboard US Country Airplay chart. They also collaborated on the song "You Make It Feel Like Christmas," featured on Stefani's 2017 holiday album of the same name.

In a January 2020 interview with Gayle King, Shelton said about Stefani: "You think you know what love is, and for me, I didn't until she came into my life." On October 27, 2020, Shelton and Stefani announced their engagement after five years of dating. The couple later shared more details, including that Shelton proposed to Stefani in front of her three children and other family members at a chapel on his property in Oklahoma. They married in that same chapel on July 3, 2021.

Through his marriage to Stefani, Shelton has three stepsons. In an interview with the Country Radio Seminar in March 2022, Shelton spoke positively about his role as a stepfather, stating, "Every day I've fallen in love with the boys as much as I do with Gwen."

In 2015, Forbes estimated Shelton's annual income at $28.5 million.

On June 6, 2017, HLN aired a special called Our Journeys Home, in which Shelton and HLN Morning Express host Robin Meade were revealed to be fourth cousins.

On October 12, 2019, Shelton officiated at the wedding of Trace Adkins and Canadian actress Victoria Pratt in New Orleans, Louisiana.

=== Philanthropy ===
In October 2013, Shelton donated $20,000 to the Oklahoma Department of Wildlife Conservation following a concert in Tulsa, Oklahoma. The donation was used to support the department's outdoor education programs. After the donation, Shelton said, "The Wildlife Department's youth education efforts are an important way to get kids back outdoors."

In September 2016, he donated $600,000 to the Jimmy Everest Center, a University of Oklahoma College of Medicine hospital for children with blood cancer and blood disorders. This donation followed a pair of Shelton's concerts in Oklahoma City, which generated the funds that he donated. Shelton claims he has a personal tie to the hospital as his cousin's daughter Aspen was diagnosed with cancer and treated at the facility. He created the Blake Shelton Cancer Research Program at that same hospital.

In February 2018, Shelton donated $50,000 to his hometown of Tishomingo, Oklahoma. He raised the money from ticket sales at his restaurant Ole Red.

On March 13, 2019, he performed a private concert at his Ole Red Gatlinburg location, celebrating its weeklong grand opening. Shelton earned $29,214 from ticket sales, and along with $25,000 from Ryman Hospitality Properties, donated the sum of $54,214 to the Gatlinburg-Pittman High School's music programs.

For a short time at the end of March 2020 into the beginning of April 2020, Shelton reduced the price of his merchandise and donated a portion of his sales to the MusiCares COVID-19 relief fund.

In April 2020, Shelton donated $150,000 to the "Give from Home Day" fundraiser, a partnership between Oklahoma City ABC affiliate news station KOCO 5 and the Regional Food Bank of Oklahoma with the goal to help feed the hungry during the COVID-19 pandemic in the United States.

== Discography ==
Studio albums

- Blake Shelton (2001)
- The Dreamer (2003)
- Blake Shelton's Barn & Grill (2004)
- Pure BS (2007)
- Startin' Fires (2008)
- Red River Blue (2011)
- Cheers, It's Christmas (2012)
- Based on a True Story... (2013)
- Bringing Back the Sunshine (2014)
- If I'm Honest (2016)
- Texoma Shore (2017)
- Fully Loaded: God's Country (2019)
- Body Language (2021)
- For Recreational Use Only (2025)

== Tours ==
Headlining

- Barn and Grill Tour (2005)
- Hillbilly Bone Tour (2010)
- All About Tonight Tour (2011)
- Well Lit & Amplified Tour (2012)
- Ten Times Crazier Tour (2013–2015)
- Blake Shelton 2016 Tour (2016)
- Doing It To Country Songs Tour (2017)
- Country Music Freaks Tour (2018)
- Friends and Heroes Tour (2019–2020)
- Back To The Honky Tonk Tour (2023)

Supporting

- Shock'n Y'all Tour (2002, with Toby Keith)
- Here's to You Tour (2005, with Rascal Flatts)
- Me and My Gang Tour (2006, with Rascal Flatts)
- H2O II: Wetter and Wilder World Tour (2011, with Brad Paisley)

== Filmography ==
Film appearances
Year	Title	Role	Notes
2005	The Christmas Blessing	Himself	Performing "Nobody but Me"
2008	Hitman: David Foster & Friends	Himself	
2014	I'll Be Me	Himself	Documentary film
2015	The Ridiculous 6	Wyatt Earp	
2015	Pitch Perfect 2	Himself	Cameo
2015	American Saturday Night: Live From The Grand Ole Opry	Himself	
2016	The Angry Birds Movie	Earl	Voice role
2019	UglyDolls	Ox	Voice role

TV credits
Year	Title	Role	Notes
2006	Jeff Foxworthy's Big Night Out	Himself	Episode: "Blake Shelton" (1.11); performing "Ol' Red" and "Don't Make Me"
2007	Blake Shelton Makes a Video	Himself	Special (broadcast on Great American Country)
2007	The Collection	Himself	Two-part episode on Great American Country
2007	Clash of the Choirs	Himself/judge	
2007	Nashville Star	Himself/judge	Season seven
2008	Larry the Cable Guy's Star-Studded Christmas Extravaganza	Himself	Christmas special
2009	Backstory: Blake Shelton	Himself	Special (on Great American Country (2012 updated version)
2010–2015	Academy of Country Music Awards	Himself/co-host	Alongside Reba McEntire and Luke Bryan
2010	The Price Is Right	Himself	
2010	Blake Shelton Live: It's All About Tonight	Himself	Concert special (on Great American Country)
2011–2023	The Voice	Himself/coach	
2011	CMT Invitation Only: Blake Shelton	Himself	
2012	Blake Shelton's Not So Family Christmas	Himself/host	Christmas special
2012	The Making of Cheers, It's Christmas with Blake Shelton & Friends	Himself/host	Great American Country Christmas special
2012	Michael Bublé: Home for the Holidays	Himself	Christmas special
2012, 2013, 2016, 2019	New Year's Eve with Carson Daly	Himself	
2013	Kelly Clarkson's Cautionary Christmas Music Tale	Himself	Christmas special
2013	Malibu Country	Blake MacKenzie	Episode: "Oh Brother" (1.15)
2013	Bounty Hunters	Buck Masters	Episode: "Team Buck" (1.06); animated voice role
2013	Oprah's Next Chapter on the Set of The Voice	Himself	
2014	WWE Tribute to the Troops	Himself	Special
2015–2016	Red Nose Day	Himself/performer	Special
2015	Saturday Night Live	Himself/host & musical guest	Episode: "Blake Shelton"
2015	Michael Bublé's Christmas in Hollywood	Himself	Christmas special
2016	2016 Kids' Choice Awards	Himself/host	
2016	CMT's Hot 20 Countdown	Himself/co-host	1 episode
2016	Blake Shelton: Man Behind the Voice	Himself	Special (broadcast on Reelz)
2017	Gwen Stefani's You Make It Feel Like Christmas	Himself	Special
2018	Sugar	Himself	Episode: "Blake Shelton surprises a fan inspired by his music while in foster care"; web television series
2018	Time for Me to Come Home for Christmas	Producer	TV film (Hallmark Channel)
2018	A Legendary Christmas With John and Chrissy	Himself	Christmas special
2019	Elvis All-Star Tribute	Himself/performer	Special; performing "Suspicious Minds", "Trouble/Guitar Man", and "If I Can Dream"
2019	Time for You to Come Home for Christmas	Producer	TV (Hallmark Channel)
2020	The Gayle King GRAMMY Special	Himself	
2020	Jay Leno's Garage	Himself	Episode: "Dare to Dream"
2020	The Voice Holiday Celebration	Himself	Special
2020	Time for Us to Come Home for Christmas	Producer	TV film (Hallmark Channel)
2021	Grand Ole Opry: 95 Years of Country Music	Himself/co-host	Special; alongside Brad Paisley
2021	Jonas Brothers Family Roast	Himself	Netflix Special; alongside John Legend, Sophie Turner, Niall Horan, and more.
2021	Time for Them to Come Home for Christmas	Producer	TV film (Hallmark Channel)
2021	That's My Jam	Himself/Guest	Along with Kelly Clarkson, John Legend, Ariana Grande
2021	New Year's Eve Live: Nashville's Big Bash	Himself	Christmas special; alongside Jason Aldean, Gabby Barrett, Luke Bryan, and more.

== Record as coach on The Voice ==
Shelton was a coach on NBC's The Voice from its inception in 2011 until the twenty-third season in 2023. Shelton had been the most successful coach, having brought at least one artist from his team (for a total of 38) to the finale in almost every season (except season five), nine of which went on to win the season.

Season	Finalist	Result
1	Dia Frampton	Runner-up
2	Jermaine Paul	Winner
3	Cassadee Pope	Winner
3	Terry McDermott	Runner-up
4	Danielle Bradbery	Winner
4	The Swon Brothers	Third place
5	Cole Vosbury	Semi-finalist
6	Jake Worthington	Runner-up
7	Craig Wayne Boyd	Winner
8	Meghan Linsey	Runner-up
9	Emily Ann Roberts	Runner-up
9	Barrett Baber	Third place
10	Adam Wakefield	Runner-up
11	Sundance Head	Winner
12	Lauren Duski	Runner-up
12	Aliyah Moulden	Third place
13	Chloe Kohanski	Winner
13	Red Marlow	Fourth place
14	Kyla Jade	Third place
14	Spensha Baker	Fourth place
15	Chris Kroeze	Runner-up
15	Kirk Jay	Third place
16	Gyth Rigdon	Runner-up
16	Dexter Roberts	Third place
16	Andrew Sevener	Fourth place
17	Ricky Duran	Runner-up
18	Todd Tilghman	Winner
18	Toneisha Harris	Runner-up
19	Jim Ranger	Runner-up
19	Ian Flanigan	Third place
20	Cam Anthony	Winner
20	Jordan Matthew Young	Third place
21	Wendy Moten	Runner-up
21	Paris Winningham	Third place
22	Bryce Leatherwood	Winner
22	bodie	Runner-up
22	Brayden Lape	Fifth place
23	Grace West	Runner-up
23	Noivas	Fifth place

Preceded by Kevin Hart	Saturday Night Live host January 24, 2015	Succeeded by J. K. Simmons
Preceded by Sia	Saturday Night Live musical guest January 24, 2015	Succeeded by D'Angelo
