= List of awards and nominations received by Blake Shelton =

Blake Shelton awards and nominations
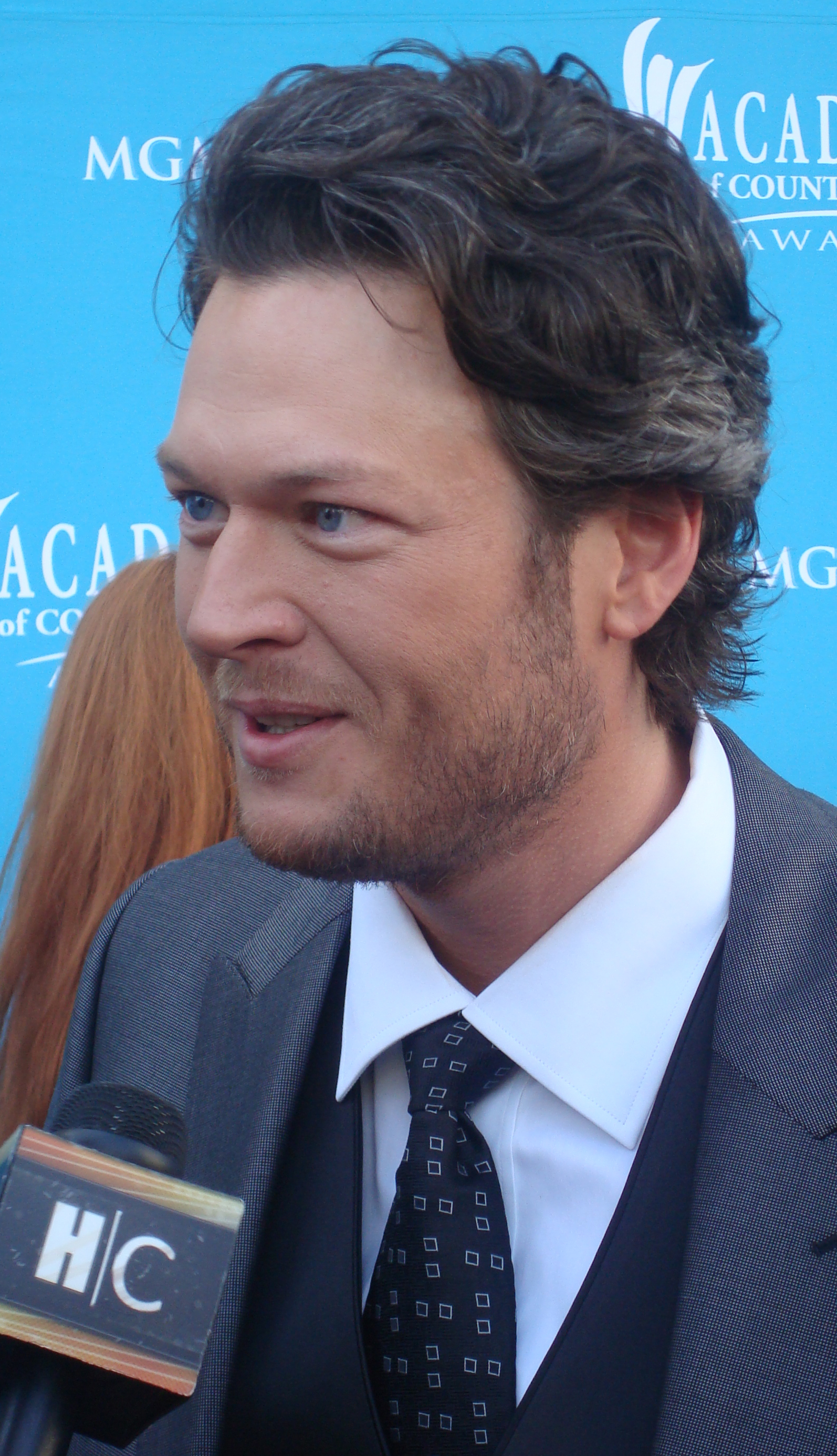
- Shelton at the 2010 ACM Awards
Awards and nominations
Award	Wins	Nominations
American Music Awards	3	4
Billboard	1	7
Grammy	0	9
Academy of Country Music Awards	6	16
Country Music Association Awards	11	18
CMT Music Awards	10	8
People's Choice Awards	7	11

Totals (Note: Certain award groups do not simply award one winner. They acknowledge several different recipients, have runners-up, and have third place. Since this is a specific recognition and is different from losing an award, runner-up mentions are considered wins in this award tally. For simplification and to avoid errors, each award in this list has been presumed to have had a prior nomination.)
- Wins: 113
- Nominations: 118

This is a list of awards and nominations received by American singer, s songwriter and television personality Blake Shelton. Throughout the course of his career, Shelton has been honoured with many accolades, including being member of the Grand Ole Opry, in 2010 and inducted into the Oklahoma Hall of Fame in 2014.

Shelton has been the recipient of 10 Country Music Association Awards, six Academy of Country Music Awards, one CMT Artist of the Year award, and 10 CMT Music Awards. He has also received eight American Country Awards, seven People's Choice Awards, three American Music Awards, one Billboard Music Award, and one iHeartRadio Music Award. Shelton has garnered nine Grammy nominations throughout his career, including nominations for Best Country Album, Best Country Solo Performance, and Best Music Film.

The CMA Awards also recognizes Shelton, in addition to George Strait and Vince Gill, as the record holders for the most Male Vocalist of the Year wins, as all three have each garnered five victories. On January 18, 2017, Shelton made People's Choice Awards history by becoming the first country artist to ever win the all-genre category of Favorite Album over competitors Beyoncé, Drake, Rihanna and Ariana Grande.

As a television personality and supporter of country music, Shelton was awarded the prestigious Gene Weed Special Achievement Award from the Academy of Country Music in 2013. For his work on The Voice, Shelton received the NATPE Reality Breakthrough Award for Best Reality Personality in 2017.

== Academy of Country Music Awards ==
Category	Year	Nominated work / Recipient	Result
Top New Male Vocalist	2001	Blake Shelton	Nominated
Top New Male Vocalist	2002	Blake Shelton	Nominated
Vocal Event of the Year	2003	"The Truth About Men" (with Tracy Byrd, Andy Griggs and Montgomery Gentry)	Nominated
Vocal Event of the Year	2010	"Hillbilly Bone" (with Trace Adkins)	Won
Vocal Event of the Year	2014	"Boys 'Round Here" (feat. Pistol Annies)	Nominated
Vocal Event of the Year	2017	"Forever Country" (with Artists of Then, Now & Forever)	Nominated
Music Event of the Year	2020	"Dive Bar" (with Garth Brooks)	Nominated
Music Event of the Year	2021	"Nobody but You" (with Gwen Stefani)	Nominated
Male Vocalist of the Year	2011	Blake Shelton	Nominated
Male Vocalist of the Year	2012	Blake Shelton	Won
Male Vocalist of the Year	2013	Blake Shelton	Nominated
Male Vocalist of the Year	2014	Blake Shelton	Nominated
Entertainer of the Year	2012	Blake Shelton	Nominated
Entertainer of the Year	2013	Blake Shelton	Nominated
Entertainer of the Year	2014	Blake Shelton	Nominated
Gene Weed Special Achievement Award	2013	Blake Shelton	Won
Song of the Year	2013	"Over You" (writer)	Won
Song of the Year	2014	"Mine Would Be You"	Nominated
Song of the Year	2020	"God's Country" (artist)	Nominated
Album of the Year	2014	Based on a True Story...	Nominated
Video of the Year	2011	"Hillbilly Bone" (with Trace Adkins)	Nominated
Video of the Year	2017	"Forever Country" (with Artists of Then, Now & Forever)	Won
Video of the Year	2020	"God's Country"	Nominated
Single of the Year	2018	"I'll Name the Dogs"	Nominated
Single of the Year	2020	"God's Country"	Won

== American Country Awards ==
Year	Category	Nominated work / Recipient	Result	Ref.
2010	Music Video of the Year	"Hillbilly Bone" (with Trace Adkins)	Won	
2010	Male Music Video of the Year	"Hillbilly Bone" (with Trace Adkins)	Won	
2011	Male Artist of the Year	Blake Shelton	Nominated	
2011	Music Video of the Year	"Who Are You When I'm Not Looking"	Won	
2011	Music Video by a Male Artist	"Who Are You When I'm Not Looking"	Won	
2012	Album of the Year	"Red River Blue"	Nominated	
2012	Music Video of the Year	"God Gave Me You"	Nominated	
2012	Music Video by a Male	"God Gave Me You"	Nominated	
2013	Artist of the Year	Blake Shelton	Nominated	
2013	Male Artist of the Year	Blake Shelton	Nominated	
2013	Album of the Year	Based on a True Story...	Won	
2013	Single by a Male Artist	"Sure Be Cool If You Did"	Won	
2013	Single by a Vocal Collaboration	"Boys 'Round Here" (feat. Pistol Annies)	Nominated	
2013	Great American Country – Music Video of the Year	"Sure Be Cool If You Did"	Won	
2013	Music Video by a Male Artist	"Sure Be Cool If You Did"	Won	

== American Country Countdown Awards ==
Year	Category	Nominated work / Recipient	Result	Ref.
2014	Artist of the Year	Blake Shelton	Nominated	
2014	Male Vocalist of the Year	Blake Shelton	Nominated	
2014	Collaboration of the Year	"My Eyes" (feat. Gwen Sebastian)	Nominated	
2016	Artist of the Year	Blake Shelton	Nominated	
2016	Male Vocalist of the Year	Blake Shelton	Nominated	

== American Music Awards ==
Year	Category	Nominated work / Recipient	Result	Ref.
2011	Favorite Country Male Artist	Blake Shelton	Won	
2013	Favorite Country Male Artist	Blake Shelton	Nominated	
2014	Favorite Country Male Artist	Blake Shelton	Nominated	
2016	Favorite Country Male Artist	Blake Shelton	Won	
2019	Favorite Country Song	"God's Country"	Nominated	
2020	Favorite Song - Country	"Nobody but You" (duet with Gwen Stefani)	Nominated	
2020	Favorite Album - Country	Fully Loaded: God's Country	Won	

== ASCAP Awards ==
The American Society of Composers, Authors and Publishers (ASCAP) hosts a series of awards shows, honoring artists in different music categories; Country music is one of its seven categories. Shelton has been honored 29 times by the ASCAP Country Music Awards.

Year	Category	Song	Result	Ref.
2002	Award-winning Song	"Austin"	Won	
2003	Song of the Year	"All Over Me"	Won	
2003	Song of the Year	"The Baby"	Won	
2005	Top 5 Songs	"Some Beach"	Won	
2008	Top 5 Songs	"Don't Make Me"	Won	
2008	Top 5 Songs	"The More I Drink"	Won	
2009	Most Performed Songs	"Home"	Won	
2010	Most Performed Songs	"Hillbilly Bone" (with Trace Adkins)	Won	
2011	Most Performed Songs	"All About Tonight"	Won	
2011	Most Performed Songs	"Who Are You When I'm Not Looking"	Won	
2012	Song of the Year / Top 5 Song	"Honey Bee"	Won	
2012	Most Performed Song / Top 5 Song	"God Gave Me You"	Won	
2013	Most Performed Songs	"Drink on It"	Won	
2013	Most Performed Songs	"Over"	Won	
2014	Most Performed Songs	"Boys 'Round Here" (feat. Pistol Annies)	Won	
2014	Most Performed Songs	"Mine Would Be You"	Won	
2014	Most Performed Songs	"Sure Be Cool If You Did"	Won	
2015	Award-winning Song	"My Eyes" (featuring Gwen Sebastian)	Won	
2015	Award-winning Song	"Lonely Tonight" (featuring Ashley Monroe)	Won	
2015	Award-winning Song	"Neon Light"	Won	
2016	Top 5 Song	"Gonna"	Won	
2016	Award-winning Song	"Sangria"	Won	
2017	Award-winning Song	"Came Here to Forget"	Won	
2017	Award-winning Song	"A Guy with a Girl"	Won	
2018	Most Performed Songs	"Every Time I Hear That Song"	Won	
2018	Most Performed Songs	"I'll Name the Dogs"	Won	
2019	Most Performed Songs	"I Lived It"	Won	
2020	Most Performed Songs	"God's Country"	Won	
2020	Most Performed Songs	"Dive Bar" (Garth Brooks with Blake Shelton)	Won	

== Billboard Music Awards ==
Year	Category	Nominated work / Recipient	Result	Ref.
2012	Top Country Artist	Blake Shelton	Nominated	
2012	Top Country Song	"Honey Bee"	Nominated	
2014	Top Country Artist	Blake Shelton	Nominated	
2014	Top Country Album	Based on a True Story...	Nominated	
2014	Top Country Song	"Boys 'Round Here" (feat. Pistol Annies)	Nominated	
2015	Top Country Artist	Blake Shelton	Nominated	
2017	Top Country Artist	Blake Shelton	Won	
2017	Top Country Album	If I'm Honest	Nominated	
2020	Top Selling Song	"God's Country"	Nominated	
2020	Top Country Song	"God's Country"	Nominated	

== BMI Awards ==
The Broadcast Music, Incorporated (BMI) Awards is an annual award show hosted for the purpose of giving awards to songwriters. Songwriters are selected each year from the entire BMI catalog, based on the number of performances during the award period. Shelton has been honored with 29 BMI Country awards.

Year	Category	Song	Result	Ref.
2001	Top 50 Songs	"All Over Me"	Won	
2003	Award-winning Songs	"The Baby"	Won	
2003	Award-winning Songs	"Ol' Red	Won	
2005	Award-winning Songs	"Some Beach"	Won	
2006	Award-winning Songs	"Goodbye Time"	Won	
2006	Award-winning Songs	"Nobody but Me"	Won	
2009	Award-winning Songs	"Home"	Won	
2009	Award-winning Songs	"She Wouldn't Be Gone"	Won	
2010	Award-winning Songs	"Hillbilly Bone" (with Trace Adkins)	Won	
2010	Award-winning Songs	"I'll Just Hold On"	Won	
2011	Award-winning Songs	"All About Tonight"	Won	
2011	Award-winning Songs	"Who Are You When I'm Not Looking"	Won	
2012	Top 50 Songs	"Honey Bee"	Won	
2013	Top 50 Songs	"Drink on It"	Won	
2013	Top 50 Songs	"Over"	Won	
2013	Top 50 Songs	"Over You"	Won	
2014	Top 50 Songs	"Boys 'Round Here" (feat. Pistol Annies)	Won	
2014	Top 50 Songs	"Mine Would Be You"	Won	
2014	Top 50 Songs	"Sure Be Cool If You Did"	Won	
2015	Top 50 Songs	"Doin' What She Likes"	Won	
2015	Top 50 Songs	"My Eyes"	Won	
2015	Top 50 Songs	"Neon Light"	Won	
2016	Top 50 Songs	"Gonna"	Won	
2017	Top 50 Songs	"A Guy with a Girl"	Won	
2018	Top 50 Songs	"Every Time I Hear That Song"	Won	
2018	Top 50 Songs	"I'll Name the Dogs"	Won	
2019	Top 50 Songs	"I Lived It"	Won	
2020	Most Performed Songs	"God's Country"	Won	
2020	Most Performed Songs	"Dive Bar" (Garth Brooks with Blake Shelton)	Won	

== Country Music Association Awards ==
Year	Category	Nominated work / Recipient	Result	Ref.
2003	Horizon Award	Blake Shelton	Nominated	
2003	Vocal Event of the Year	"The Truth About Men" (with Tracy Byrd, Andy Griggs and Montgomery Gentry)	Nominated	
2010	Male Vocalist of The Year	Blake Shelton	Won	
2010	Vocal Event of the Year	"Hillbilly Bone" (with Trace Adkins)	Won	
2010	Single of the Year	"Hillbilly Bone" (with Trace Adkins)	Nominated	
2010	Music Video of the Year	"Hillbilly Bone" (with Trace Adkins)	Nominated	
2011	Entertainer of the Year	Blake Shelton	Nominated	
2011	Male Vocalist of the Year	Blake Shelton	Won	
2011	Single of the Year	"Honey Bee"	Nominated	
2011	Music Video of the Year	"Honey Bee"	Nominated	
2011	Album of the Year	All About Tonight	Nominated	
2012	Entertainer of the Year	Blake Shelton	Won	
2012	Male Vocalist of the Year	Blake Shelton	Won	
2012	Single of the Year	"God Gave Me You"	Nominated	
2012	Song of the Year	"Over You" (with Miranda Lambert)	Won	
2013	Entertainer of the Year	Blake Shelton	Nominated	
2013	Male Vocalist of the Year	Blake Shelton	Won	
2013	Album of the Year	Based on a True Story...	Won	
2013	Musical Event of the Year	"Boys 'Round Here" (feat. Pistol Annies)	Nominated	
2013	Music Video of the Year	"Boys 'Round Here" (feat. Pistol Annies)	Nominated	
2014	Entertainer of the Year	Blake Shelton	Nominated	
2014	Male Vocalist of the Year	Blake Shelton	Won	
2014	Single of the Year	"Mine Would Be You"	Nominated	
2015	Male Vocalist of the Year	Blake Shelton	Nominated	
2015	Musical Event Of The Year	"Lonely Tonight" (featuring Ashley Monroe)	Nominated	
2019	Musical Event Of The Year	“Dive Bar” (featuring Garth Brooks)	Nominated	
2019	Music Video of the Year	"God's Country"	Nominated	
2019	Single of the Year	"God's Country"	Won	

== Country Radio Seminar ==
Year	Category	Nominated work / Recipient	Result	Ref.
2019	Artist Humanitarian Award	Blake Shelton	Won	

== CMC Music Awards ==
Year	Category	Nominated work / Recipient	Result	Ref.
2014	International Video of the Year	"Boys 'Round Here" (featuring Pistol Annies)	Nominated	
2018	International Artist of the Year	Blake Shelton	Nominated	
2018	International Video of the Year	"I'll Name the Dogs"	Nominated	

== CMT Music Awards ==
Year	Category	Nominated work / Recipient	Result	Ref.
2010	Collaborative Video of the Year	"Hillbilly Bone" (with Trace Adkins)	Won	
2011	Male Video of the Year	"Who Are You When I'm Not Looking"	Won	
2012	Video of The Year	"God Gave Me You"	Nominated	
2012	Male Video of The Year	"God Gave Me You"	Nominated	
2012	CMT Performance of The Year	"Footloose"	Nominated	
2013	Male Video of the Year	"Sure Be Cool If You Did"	Won	
2014	Video of the Year	"Boys 'Round Here" (feat. Pistol Annies)	Nominated	
2014	Male Video of the Year	"Doin' What She Likes"	Won	
2014	Collaborative Video of the Year	"Boys 'Round Here" (feat. Pistol Annies)	Nominated	
2015	Collaborative Video of the Year	"Lonely Tonight" (duet with Ashley Monroe)	Nominated	
2015	CMT Artists of the Year	Blake Shelton	Won	
2016	Video of the Year	"Sangria"	Nominated	
2016	Male Video of the Year	"Sangria"	Nominated	
2016	CMT Social Superstar	Blake Shelton	Won	
2017	Male Video of the Year	"Came Here to Forget"	Nominated	
2018	Video of the Year	"I'll Name the Dogs"	Won	
2018	Male Video of the Year	"I'll Name the Dogs"	Won	
2020	Collaborative Video of the Year	"Nobody but You" (duet with Gwen Stefani)	Won	

=== Teddy Awards ===
The CMT Teddy Awards is a special music video award show dedicated to celebrate Valentine's Day.

Year	Category	Nominated work	Result	Ref.
2012	Best Flirting Video	"Honey Bee"	Won	

== Grammy Awards ==
Year	Category	Nominated work	Result	Ref.
2011	Best Country Collaboration with Vocals	"Hillbilly Bone" (featuring Trace Adkins)	Nominated	
2012	Best Country Album	Red River Blue	Nominated	
2012	Best Country Solo Performance	"Honey Bee"	Nominated	
2013	Best Country Solo Performance	"Over"	Nominated	
2014	Best Country Solo Performance	"Mine Would Be You"	Nominated	
2014	Best Country Album	Based on a True Story...	Nominated	
2016	Best Country Duo/Group Performance	"Lonely Tonight" (featuring Ashley Monroe)	Nominated	
2017	Best Music Film	American Saturday Night: Live From The Grand Ole Opry	Nominated	
2020	Best Country Solo Performance	"God's Country"	Nominated	

== iHeartRadio Music Awards ==
Year	Category	Nominated work / Recipient	Result	Ref.
2014	Country Song of the Year	"Mine Would Be You"	Nominated	
2014	Country Song of the Year	"Boys 'Round Here" (feat. Pistol Annies)	Won	
2016	Country Artist of the Year	Blake Shelton	Nominated	
2017	Best Lyrics	"Came Here to Forget"	Nominated	
2018	Country Artist of the Year	Blake Shelton	Nominated	
2020	Country Song of the Year	"God's Country"	Nominated	
2021	Country Artist of the Year	Blake Shelton	Nominated	
2021	Country Song of the Year	"Nobody but You"	Nominated	

== Inspirational Country Music Awards ==
The Inspirational Country Music Awards are a member-voted award show dedicated to honoring and showcasing the biggest names and emerging talent among artists who perform Christian and inspirational country music. It was established in 1992.

Year	Category	Nominated work	Result	Ref.
2012	Video of the Year	"God Gave Me You"	Nominated	

== Kids' Choice Awards ==
Year	Category	Recipient	Result	Ref.
2013	Favorite Male Singer	Blake Shelton	Nominated	
2015	Favorite Male Artist	Blake Shelton	Nominated	
2016	Favorite Male Singer	Blake Shelton	Nominated	

== MTV Movie & TV Awards ==
Year	Category	Recipient	Result	Ref.
2017	Best Duo	Blake Shelton and Adam Levine	Nominated	

== Music Row Awards ==
Year	Category	Recipient	Result	Ref.
2002	Critic's Pick	Blake Shelton	Won	

=== Country Breakout Awards ===
Year	Category	Nominated work / Recipient	Result	Ref.
2014	Male Artist of the Year	Blake Shelton	Won	
2018	Male Artist of the Year	Blake Shelton	Won	

== NATPE Reality Breakthrough Awards ==
Year	Category	Recipient	Result	Ref.
2017	NATPE Reality Breakthrough Award – Best Reality Personality	Blake Shelton	Won	

== People's Choice Awards ==
Year	Category	Nominated work / Recipient	Result	Ref.
2012	Favorite Male Artist	Blake Shelton	Nominated	
2012	Favorite Country Artist	Blake Shelton	Nominated	
2013	Favorite Male Artist	Blake Shelton	Nominated	
2013	Favorite Country Artist	Blake Shelton	Nominated	
2014	Favorite Male Artist	Blake Shelton	Nominated	
2014	Favorite Country Artist	Blake Shelton	Nominated	
2014	Favorite Album	Based on a True Story...	Nominated	
2015	Favorite Male Artist	Blake Shelton	Nominated	
2015	Favorite Male Country Artist	Blake Shelton	Nominated	
2016	Favorite Male Country Artist	Blake Shelton	Won	
2017	Favorite Male Artist	Blake Shelton	Nominated	
2017	Favorite Male Country Artist	Blake Shelton	Won	
2017	Favorite Album	If I'm Honest	Won	
2018	Favorite Male Country Artist	Blake Shelton	Won	
2019	The Country Artist of 2019	Blake Shelton	Won	
2020	The Male Artist of 2020	Blake Shelton	Nominated	
2020	The Country Artist of 2020	Blake Shelton	Won	
2021	The Country Artist of 2021	Blake Shelton	Won	

== Rare Country Awards ==
Year	Category	Nominated work / Recipient	Result	Ref.
2016	Male Artist of the Year	Blake Shelton	Won	
2016	Story of the Year	Blake Shelton	Won	
2017	Male Artist of the Year	Blake Shelton	Won	
2017	Fan Moment of the Year	Blake Shelton	Won	
2017	Grand Ole Opry® Moment of the Year	Blake Shelton	Nominated	

== Teen Choice Awards ==
Year	Category	Nominated work / Recipient	Result	Ref.
2011	Choice Male Country Artist	Blake Shelton	Nominated	
2011	Choice Country Single	"Honey Bee"	Nominated	
2012	Choice Male Artist	Blake Shelton	Nominated	
2012	Choice Male Country Artist	Blake Shelton	Nominated	
2012	Choice Country Song	"God Gave Me You"	Nominated	
2013	Choice Male Country Artist	Blake Shelton	Nominated	
2013	Choice Country Song	"Boys 'Round Here" (feat. Pistol Annies)	Nominated	
2013	Choice TV Personality: Male	Blake Shelton	Nominated	
2014	Choice Male Country Artist	Blake Shelton	Nominated	
2015	Choice Male Country Artist	Blake Shelton	Nominated	
2016	Choice Male Country Artist	Blake Shelton	Nominated	
2016	Choice Country Song	"Go Ahead and Break My Heart" (duet with Gwen Stefani)	Nominated	
2017	Choice Country Artist	Blake Shelton	Nominated	
2017	Choice Country Song	"Every Time I Hear That Song"	Nominated	
2017	Choice TV Personality	Blake Shelton	Nominated	
2017	Choice Twit	Blake Shelton	Nominated	
2018	Choice Country Artist	Blake Shelton	Nominated	

== World Music Awards ==
Year	Category	Recipient(s)	Result	Ref.
2012	World's Best Male Artist	Blake Shelton	Nominated	

== Young Hollywood Awards ==
Year	Category	Recipient(s)	Result	Ref.
2014	Young Hollywood Award for Best Bromance	Blake Shelton and Adam Levine	Nominated	

== Other honors ==
=== Inductions ===
- 2010: Grand Ole Opry
- 2014: Oklahoma Hall of Fame
