= Ten Times Crazier Tour =

2013–15 concert tour by Blake Shelton

- Tour by Blake Shelton
- 2013 tour poster
- Location: North America
- Associated album: Based on a True Story…
- Start date: July 19, 2013
- End date: June 26, 2015
- Legs: 2
- No. of shows: 62
- Box office: $17,999,504

Blake Shelton concert chronology
- Well Lit & Amplified Tour (2012); Ten Times Crazier Tour (2013–14)

2014 tour poster

The Ten Times Crazier Tour was the fifth headlining concert tour by American country music singer Blake Shelton. The tour was in support of his eighth studio album, Based on a True Story… (2013). The tour began on July 19, 2013, in Virginia Beach, Virginia and ended on June 26, 2015, in Dover, Delaware.

== Background ==
The tour was first announced on January 17, 2013. Shelton response for the tour, "My fans, country radio, friends, family, you name it -- they know I love to perform, "With 'The Voice' schedule, I was not able to go out and perform as much as I wanted last year but I plan to make up for it this year. This summer is going to be a blast."

Opening acts for the 2013 leg were Easton Corbin and Jana Kramer. The 2014 leg of the tour was first announced in January 2014 and will be sponsored by Pepsi. The Band Perry, Neal McCoy, and Dan + Shay will serve as opening acts for the second leg.

It was announced on April 10, 2014 that Shelton would perform a free show on the beach in Atlantic City, New Jersey on July 31, 2014

== Opening acts ==
2013

- Easton Corbin
- Jana Kramer

2014

- The Band Perry
- Neal McCoy
- Dan + Shay
- MacKenzie Porter (select dates)

== Setlist ==
2013

1. "All About Tonight"
2. "The More I Drink"
3. "Over"
4. "Kiss My Country Ass"
5. "She Wouldn't Be Gone"
6. "Mine Would Be You"
7. "Playboys of the Southwestern World"
8. "Some Beach"
9. "Ol' Red"
10. "Who Are You When I'm Not Looking"
11. "Sure Be Cool If You Did"
12. "Hillbilly Bone"
13. "Over You"
14. "Austin"
15. "Drink on It"
16. "Home" (Michael Bublé cover)
17. "Honey Bee"
18. "Boys 'Round Here"

Encore

19. "Footloose" (Kenny Loggins cover)
20. "God Gave Me You" (Dave Barnes cover)
2014

1. "All About Tonight"
2. "The More I Drink"
3. "Doin' What She Likes"
4. "She Wouldn't Be Gone"
5. "Kiss My Country Ass"
6. "Mine Would Be You"
7. "Nobody But Me"
8. "Some Beach"
9. "Ol' Red"
10. "Who Are You When I'm Not Looking"
11. "Hillbilly Bone"
12. "Sure Be Cool If You Did"
13. "Neon Light" (select shows)
14. "My Eyes"
15. "Over You"
16. "Austin"
17. "Drink on It"
18. "Home"
19. "Honey Bee"
20. "Boys 'Round Here"

Encore

21. "Footloose" (Kenny Loggins cover)
22. "God Gave Me You"

Notes

- On July 27, 2013, Cassadee Pope surprised the crowd and performed her song, "Wasting All These Tears".
- On July 31, 2014, Danielle Bradbery surprised the crowd and performed her song, "The Heart of Dixie".

== Tour dates ==
| Date | City | Country | Venue | Opening act(s) |
North America Leg 1
| July 19, 2013 | Virginia Beach | United States | Farm Bureau Live | Easton Corbin; Jana Kramer |
| July 20, 2013 | Bristow | United States | Jiffy Lube Live | Easton Corbin; Jana Kramer |
| July 21, 2013 | Wantagh | United States | Nikon at Jones Beach Theatre | Easton Corbin; Jana Kramer |
| July 26, 2013 | Maryland Heights | United States | Verizon Wireless Amphitheatre | Easton Corbin; Jana Kramer |
| July 27, 2013 | Noblesville | United States | Klipsch Music Center | Easton Corbin; Jana Kramer |
| July 28, 2013 | Cincinnati | United States | Riverbend Music Center | Easton Corbin; Jana Kramer |
| August 1, 2013 | Cuyahoga Falls | United States | Blossom Music Center | Easton Corbin; Jana Kramer |
| August 2, 2013 | Burgettstown | United States | First Niagara Pavilion | Easton Corbin; Jana Kramer |
| August 3, 2013 | Tinley Park | United States | First Midwest Bank Amphitheatre | Easton Corbin; Jana Kramer |
| August 9, 2013 | Raleigh | United States | Time Warner Cable Music Pavilion | Easton Corbin; Jana Kramer |
| August 10, 2013 | Camden | United States | Susquehanna Bank Center | Easton Corbin; Jana Kramer |
| August 11, 2013 | Bethel | United States | Bethel Woods Center for the Arts | Easton Corbin; Jana Kramer |
| August 29, 2013 | Atlanta | United States | Aaron's Amphitheatre | Easton Corbin; Jana Kramer |
| August 30, 2013 | Tampa | United States | MidFlorida Credit Union Amphitheatre | Easton Corbin; Jana Kramer |
| August 31, 2013 | West Palm Beach | United States | Cruzan Amphitheatre | Easton Corbin; Jana Kramer |
| September 5, 2013 | Holmdel | United States | PNC Bank Arts Center | Easton Corbin; Jana Kramer |
| September 6, 2013 | Hartford | United States | Comcast Theatre | Easton Corbin; Jana Kramer |
| September 7, 2013 | Mansfield | United States | Comcast Center | Easton Corbin; Jana Kramer |
| September 12, 2013 | Saint Paul | United States | Xcel Energy Center | Easton Corbin; Jana Kramer |
| September 13, 2013 | Milwaukee | United States | BMO Harris Bradley Center | Easton Corbin; Jana Kramer |
| September 14, 2013 | Nashville | United States | Bridgestone Arena | Easton Corbin; Jana Kramer |
| September 19, 2013 | Charleston | United States | Charleston Civic Center | Easton Corbin; Jana Kramer |
| September 20, 2013 | Columbus | United States | Nationwide Arena | Easton Corbin; Jana Kramer |
| September 21, 2013 | Lexington | United States | Rupp Arena | Easton Corbin; Jana Kramer |
| September 26, 2013 | Charlottesville | United States | John Paul Jones Arena | Easton Corbin; Jana Kramer |
| September 27, 2013 | Knoxville | United States | Thompson–Boling Arena | Easton Corbin; Jana Kramer |
| September 28, 2013 | Auburn Hills | United States | The Palace of Auburn Hills | Easton Corbin; Jana Kramer |
| October 3, 2013 | Kansas City | United States | Sprint Center | Easton Corbin; Jana Kramer |
| October 4, 2013 | Tulsa | United States | BOK Center | Easton Corbin; Jana Kramer |
| October 5, 2013 | Wichita | United States | Intrust Bank Arena | Easton Corbin; Jana Kramer |
North America Leg 2
| March 15, 2014 | Nashville | United States | Grand Ole Opry | — |
| March 15, 2014 | Nashville | United States | Grand Ole Opry | — |
| March 20, 2014 | Houston | United States | Reliant Stadium | The Band Perry |
| June 20, 2014 | Austin | United States | Austin360 Amphitheatre | The Band Perry; Dan + Shay; Neal McCoy |
| June 21, 2014 | Dallas | United States | Gexa Energy Pavilion | The Band Perry; Dan + Shay; Neal McCoy |
| June 22, 2014 | North Little Rock | United States | Verizon Arena | The Band Perry; Dan + Shay; Neal McCoy |
| June 26, 2014 (Note: The show on June 26, 2014, waz part of the Chippewa Valley Country Festival.) | Cadott | United States | Chippewa Valley Country Fest | The Band Perry; Dan + Shay; Neal McCoy |
| June 28, 2014 (Note: The show on June 28, 2014, was a part of the Dauphin Countryfest.) | Dauphin | Canada | Dauphin Countryfest | The Band Perry; Dan + Shay; Neal McCoy |
| July 3, 2014 (Note: The show on July 3, 2014, was a part of the RBC Royal Bank Bluesfest.) | Ottawa | Canada | RBC Royal Bank Bluesfest | The Band Perry; Dan + Shay; Neal McCoy |
| July 5, 2014 (Note: The show on Kuky 5, 2014, was a part of the Cavendish Beach Music Festival.) | Cavendish Beach | Canada | Cavendish Beach Music Festival | The Band Perry; Dan + Shay; Neal McCoy |
| July 19, 2014 | Chicago | United States | Wrigley Field | The Band Perry; Dan + Shay; Neal McCoy |
| July 22, 2014 | Saskatoon | Canada | Credit Union Centre | The Band Perry; Dan + Shay; Neal McCoy |
| July 23, 2014 | Edmonton | Canada | Rexall Place | The Band Perry; Dan + Shay; Neal McCoy |
| July 31, 2014 | Atlantic City | United States | Atlantic City Beach | Danielle Bradbery; Dan + Shay |
| August 1, 2014 | New York City | United States | Madison Square Garden | The Band Perry; Dan + Shay; Neal McCoy |
| August 2, 2014 | Darien | United States | Darien Lake PAC | The Band Perry; Dan + Shay; Neal McCoy |
| August 29, 2014 | Charlotte | United States | PNC Music Pavilion | The Band Perry; Dan + Shay; Neal McCoy |
| August 30, 2014 | Orlando | United States | Amway Center | The Band Perry; Dan + Shay; Neal McCoy |
| September 4, 2014 | Albuquerque | United States | Isleta Amphitheater | The Band Perry; Dan + Shay; Neal McCoy |
| September 5, 2014 | Phoenix | United States | Ak-Chin Pavilion | The Band Perry; Dan + Shay; Neal McCoy |
| September 6, 2014 | Chula Vista | United States | Sleep Train Amphitheatre | The Band Perry; Dan + Shay; Neal McCoy |
| September 11, 2014 | Fresno | United States | Save Mart Center | The Band Perry; Dan + Shay; Neal McCoy |
| September 12, 2014 | Wheatland | United States | Sleep Train Amphitheatre | The Band Perry; Dan + Shay; Neal McCoy |
| September 13, 2014 | Mountain View | United States | Shoreline Amphitheatre | The Band Perry; Dan + Shay; Neal McCoy |
| September 18, 2014 | Spokane | United States | Spokane Arena | The Band Perry; Dan + Shay; Neal McCoy |
| September 19, 2014 | Tacoma | United States | Tacoma Dome | The Band Perry; Dan + Shay; Neal McCoy |
| September 20, 2014 | Vancouver | Canada | Rogers Arena | The Band Perry; Dan + Shay; Neal McCoy |
| September 25, 2014 | Boise | United States | Taco Bell Arena | The Band Perry; Dan + Shay; Neal McCoy |
| September 26, 2014 | West Valley City | United States | USANA Amphitheatre | The Band Perry; Dan + Shay; Neal McCoy |
| September 27, 2014 | Denver | United States | Pepsi Center | The Band Perry; Dan + Shay; Neal McCoy |
| October 3, 2014 | Las Vegas | United States | Mandalay Bay Events Center | The Band Perry; Dan + Shay; Neal McCoy |
| October 4, 2014 | Los Angeles | United States | Hollywood Bowl | The Band Perry; Dan + Shay; Neal McCoy |
| October 5, 2014 | San Bernardino | United States | San Manuel Amphitheater | The Band Perry; Dan + Shay; Neal McCoy |
North America leg 3
| April 11, 2015 | Florence | United States | Country Thunder | Danielle Bradbery; Cassadee Pope |
| April 26, 2015 | Indio | United States | Stagecoach Festival | Danielle Bradbery; Cassadee Pope |
| May 16, 2015 | Kennesaw | United States | KSU Sports & Entertainment Park | Danielle Bradbery; Cassadee Pope |
| May 23, 2015 (Note: The show on May 23, 2015, was a part of Tree Town Festival.) | Forest City | United States | Tree Town Festival | Danielle Bradbery; Cassadee Pope |
| May 24, 2015 (Note: The show on May 24, 2015, was a part of Bayou Country Superfest.) | Baton Rouge | United States | LSU Tiger Stadium | Danielle Bradbery; Cassadee Pope |
| June 20, 2015 (Note: The show on June 20, 2015, was a part of Buckeye Country Superfest.) | Columbus | United States | Ohio Stadium | Danielle Bradbery; Cassadee Pope |
| June 26, 2015 (Note: The show on May 23, 2015, was a part of Big Barrel Country Music Festival.) | Dover | United States | Dover International Speedway | Danielle Bradbery; Cassadee Pope |

== Box office score data ==
| Venue | City | Tickets sold / available | Gross revenue |
|---|---|---|---|
| Farm Bureau Live | Virginia Beach | 18,827 / 18,827 (100%) | $545,779 |
| Jiffy Lube Live | Bristow | 21,530 / 21,530 (100%) | $699,600 |
| Nikon at Jones Beach | Wantagh | 13,985 / 13,985 (100%) | $656,772 |
| Verizon Wireless Amphitheater | Maryland Heights | 19,997 / 19,997 (100%) | $629,880 |
| Klipsch Music Center | Noblesville | 24,690 / 24,690 (100%) | $789,992 |
| Riverbend Music Center | Cincinnati | 20,455 / 20,455 (100%) | $629,992 |
| Blossom Music Center | Cuyahoga Falls | 20,408 / 20,408 (100%) | $624,884 |
| First Niagara Pavilion | Burgettstown | 23,446 / 23,446 (100%) | $648,338 |
| First Midwest Bank Amphitheatre | Tinley Park | 27,996 / 27,996 (100%) | $911,336 |
| Time Warner Cable Music Pavilion | Raleigh | 19,993 / 19,993 (100%) | $631,497 |
| Susquehanna Bank Center | Camden | 23,448 / 24,000 (98%) | $674,442 |
| Bethel Woods Center | Bethel | 16,010 / 16,010 (100%) | $629,448 |
| MidFlorida Credit Union Amphitheatre | Tampa | 17,224 /19,000 (91%) | $589,446 |
| Cruzan Amphitheatre | West Palm Beach | 18,994 / 18,994 (100%) | $614,446 |
| Thompson–Boling Arena | Knoxville | 14,991 / 14,991 (100%) | $629,445 |
| BOK Center | Tulsa | 14,500 /14,500 (100%) | $2,500,000 |
| Austin360 | Austin | 13,497 / 13,497 (100%) | $638,448 |
| Gexa Energy Pavilion | Dallas | 20,066 / 20,066 (100%) | $779,696 |
| Verizon Arena | Little Rock | 14,014 / 14,014 (100%) | $683,632 |
| Wrigley Field | Chicago | 40,912 / 40,912 (100%) | $2,697,990 |
| Atlantic City Beach | Atlantic City | 65,000 / 65,000 (100%) | — |
| PNC Music Pavilion | Charlotte | 16,990 / 18,000 (94%) | $629,003 |
| Amway Center | Orlando | 12,171 / 12,171 (100%) | $611,810 |
| Isleta Amphitheatre | Albuquerque | 15,108 / 15,108 (100%) | $549,299 |
| Ak-Chin Pavilion | Phoenix | 20,788 / 20,788 (100%) | $805,880 |
| Sleep Train Amphitheatre | Wheatland | 19,344 / 19,344 (100%) | $549,299 |
| TOTAL | | 474,448 / 477,474 (99%) | $17,999,504 |

== Critical reception ==
St. Louis Today's Amanda St. Amand says that, "He put that charisma on display before a rollicking and sold-out horde on Friday night at Verizon Wireless Amphitheater with a "Ten Times Crazier" tour that proved he's a headliner well-worth his top billing... (There's a reason he's country music's reigning male vocalist and entertainer of the year.)" "Blake has such a stage presence and entertains and interacts with the crowd so well... He could follow behind the greats like George Strait, Johnny Cash, & Merle Haggard", says Melissa Gibson of All Access Magazine. Melissa Ruggieri of Access Atlanta says that Shelton's "voice is strong enough – a supple instrument that contains more range than most of his CMA-winning peers – but what makes Shelton such a delight is his interaction with the crowd and tremendous sense of humor."
