= 2014 in country music =

This is a list of notable events in country music, that took place in 2014.

== Events ==
- January 15 – Trace Adkins enters alcohol rehabilitation, after an alleged altercation with a celebrity impersonator on a cruise ship.
- January 22 – The first episode of Jills veranda airs over SVT 1.
- February 18 – Florida Georgia Line cancels an appearance at a Country Radio Broadcasters seminar, after member Tyler Hubbard injures his back in a dirt bike accident.
- March 2- Jesse McReynolds celebrates his 50th Grand Ole Opry Anniversary
- March 31 – Blake Shelton's "Doin' What She Likes" becomes his 11th consecutive number one hit on the Country Airplay chart. The song broke the record set by Brad Paisley between 2005 and 2009 for the most consecutive number one singles since the charts began using Nielsen Broadcast Data Systems in 1990. In July, Shelton sets the new Nielsen BDS-era record with his 12th-straight No. 1 song, "My Eyes" on the Country Airplay chart.
- April – Glen Campbell is moved to an Alzheimer's disease care facility.
- April 10 – Linda Ronstadt is inducted into the Rock and Roll Hall of Fame at a ceremony in Brooklyn. Due to illness, Ronstadt was unable to attend. Sheryl Crow, Emmylou Harris, Stevie Nicks, Bonnie Raitt, and Carrie Underwood pay tribute to Ronstadt during the ceremony.
- May – Nash FM adds a spinoff brand to country radio stations, called Nash Icon brand. The format mixes in current hits with songs from the 1980s onward. Some Nash Icon stations will add classic country programming (hits from the 1940s through early 1990s) either as a daily block or as part of weekend programming.
- May 5 – Scotty McCreery's apartment is invaded by three suspects. No one is injured.
- May 8 – After six years in business, the Bigger Picture Music Group record label closes.
- June 7 – George Strait plays his final concert to about 105,000 people at the AT&T Stadium in Arlington, Texas. The show sets the record for the largest indoor concert in North American history.
- July 10 – Garth Brooks announces plans for new music with RCA Nashville and a world tour.
- June 25 – Joey Martin Feek, one-half of Joey + Rory, is diagnosed with cervical cancer which is successfully removed.
- July 10 – Songwriter Dallas Davidson is charged with public intoxication and disorderly conduct at a Nashville bar.
- August 8- Osborne Brothers celebrates their 50th Grand Ole Opry Anniversary
- September 1 – Carrie Underwood announced she is expecting her first child in early 2015.
- September 12 – Lynn Anderson is arrested and charged with a DUI in Nashville, Tennessee. It is her third offense since 2004.
- October 27 – Taylor Swift releases her first officially pop album, 1989, marking her departure from country music.
- November 20 – Ty Herndon comes out as a homosexual in an interview with People. He is the second major country artist to do so, following Chely Wright in 2010. Later in the same day, Billy Gilman also comes out.
- December 4 – Brooks & Dunn announce that they will reunite for a series of shows in Las Vegas, Nevada, with Reba McEntire starting in mid-2015.
- December 22 – The Mavericks announce that they had fired bassist Robert Reynolds in October after a long struggle with his addiction to opiate.
- No date - Dick Feller, writer of "Some Days Are Diamonds (Some Days Are Stone)" and "East Bound and Down", comes out as a transgender woman and changes her name to Deena Kaye Rose. She also writes an autobiography about her transition.

== Top hits of the year ==
The following songs placed within the Top 20 on the Hot Country Songs, Country Airplay or Canada Country charts in 2014:

=== Singles released by American artists ===
| Songs | Airplay | Canada | Single | Artist | References |
|---|---|---|---|---|---|
| 19 | — | — | 17 Again | Brantley Gilbert | |
| 7 | 11 | 23 | 19 You + Me | Dan + Shay | |
| 24 | 17 | 40 | All Alright | Zac Brown Band | |
| 2 | 1 | 1 | American Kids | Kenny Chesney | |
| 4 | 3 | 1 | Automatic | Miranda Lambert | |
| 4 | 1 | 1 | Bartender | Lady Antebellum | |
| 1 | 1 | 1 | Beachin' | Jake Owen | |
| 6 | 1 | 2 | Beat of the Music | Brett Eldredge | |
| 1 | 1 | 3 | Bottoms Up | Brantley Gilbert | |
| 15 | — | — | Bumpin' the Night | Florida Georgia Line | |
| 1 | 1 | 2 | Burnin' It Down | Jason Aldean | |
| 20 | 10 | 6 | Chainsaw | The Band Perry | |
| 1 | 2 | 5 | Chillin' It | Cole Swindell | |
| 11 | 4 | 16 | Close Your Eyes | Parmalee | |
| 20 | 20 | 19 | Cold One | Eric Church | |
| 6 | 1 | 2 | Compass | Lady Antebellum | |
| 4 | 8 | 5 | Cop Car | Keith Urban | |
| 4 | 2 | 1 | Day Drinking | Little Big Town | |
| 1 | 1 | 1 | Dirt | Florida Georgia Line | |
| 3 | 1 | 1 | Doin' What She Likes | Blake Shelton | |
| 9 | 2 | 1 | Don't Let Me Be Lonely | The Band Perry | |
| 1 | 1 | 1 | Drink a Beer | Luke Bryan | |
| 4 | 1 | 1 | Drink to That All Night | Jerrod Niemann | |
| 3 | 1 | 2 | Drunk on a Plane | Dierks Bentley | |
| 19 | 15 | 33 | Dust | Eli Young Band | |
| 15 | 4 | 11 | Everything I Shouldn't Be Thinking About | Thompson Square | |
| 16 | 10 | 46 | Feelin' It | Scotty McCreery | |
| 10 | 43 | 42 | Follow Your Arrow | Kacey Musgraves | |
| 6 | 2 | 8 | Friday Night | Eric Paslay | |
| 4 | 1 | 6 | Get Me Some of That | Thomas Rhett | |
| 3 | 1 | 5 | Girl in a Country Song | Maddie & Tae | |
| 4 | 1 | 1 | Give Me Back My Hometown | Eric Church | |
| 9 | 2 | 3 | Goodnight Kiss | Randy Houser | |
| 16 | 12 | 46 | The Heart of Dixie | Danielle Bradbery | |
| 8 | 1 | 8 | Helluva Life | Frankie Ballard | |
| 7 | 1 | 6 | Hope You Get Lonely Tonight | Cole Swindell | |
| 5 | 1 | 3 | I Don't Dance | Lee Brice | |
| 23 | 17 | 39 | I Got a Car | George Strait | |
| 3 | 1 | 2 | I Hold On | Dierks Bentley | |
| 15 | — | — | I Walk the Line | Craig Wayne Boyd | |
| 4 | 19 | 30 | Invisible | Hunter Hayes | |
| 15 | 9 | 29 | Keep Them Kisses Comin' | Craig Campbell | |
| 21 | 13 | 47 | Later On | The Swon Brothers | |
| 1 | 1 | 1 | Leave the Night On | Sam Hunt | |
| 7 | 1 | 4 | Lettin' the Night Roll | Justin Moore | |
| 13 | 7 | 23 | Look at You | Big & Rich | |
| 18 | 15 | 30 | Lookin' for That Girl | Tim McGraw | |
| 7 | 2 | 1 | Meanwhile Back at Mama's | Tim McGraw featuring Faith Hill | |
| 24 | 19 | 38 | The Mona Lisa | Brad Paisley | |
| 18 | — | — | My Baby's Guns N' Roses | Brantley Gilbert | |
| 4 | 1 | 1 | My Eyes | Blake Shelton featuring Gwen Sebastian | |
| 3 | 1 | 1 | Neon Light | Blake Shelton | |
| 7 | — | — | The Old Rugged Cross | Craig Wayne Boyd | |
| 25 | 19 | 10 | People Loving People | Garth Brooks | |
| 1 | 1 | 1 | Play It Again | Luke Bryan | |
| 5 | 5 | 29 | Ready Set Roll | Chase Rice | |
| 4 | 3 | 6 | Rewind | Rascal Flatts | |
| 12 | 2 | 2 | River Bank | Brad Paisley | |
| 5 | 1 | 1 | Roller Coaster | Luke Bryan | |
| 10 | 8 | 34 | See You Tonight | Scotty McCreery | |
| 1 | 1 | 1 | Shotgun Rider | Tim McGraw | |
| 19 | 17 | 33 | Slow Me Down | Sara Evans | |
| 13 | 8 | 24 | Small Town Throwdown | Brantley Gilbert featuring Justin Moore and Thomas Rhett | |
| 1 | 7 | 6 | Somethin' Bad | Miranda Lambert duet with Carrie Underwood | |
| 3 | 1 | 4 | Somewhere in My Car | Keith Urban | |
| 18 | 12 | 25 | Song About a Girl | Eric Paslay | |
| 1 | 1 | 1 | Stay | Florida Georgia Line | |
| 5 | 1 | 4 | Sunshine & Whiskey | Frankie Ballard | |
| 6 | 1 | 2 | Sweet Annie | Zac Brown Band | |
| 17 | 53 | — | Sweet Little Somethin' | Jason Aldean | |
| 1 | 2 | 2 | This Is How We Roll | Florida Georgia Line featuring Luke Bryan | |
| 18 | — | — | Two Night Town | Jason Aldean | |
| 10 | 11 | 46 | Up All Night | Jon Pardi | |
| 20 | 14 | 40 | Wake Up Lovin' You | Craig Morgan | |
| 5 | 10 | 26 | Wasting All These Tears | Cassadee Pope | |
| 12 | 1 | 17 | We Are Tonight | Billy Currington | |
| 2 | 1 | 4 | Whatever She's Got | David Nail | |
| 2 | 1 | 1 | When She Says Baby | Jason Aldean | |
| 4 | 1 | 4 | Where It's At | Dustin Lynch | |
| 11 | 3 | 10 | Whiskey in My Water | Tyler Farr | |
| 8 | 2 | 6 | Who I Am with You | Chris Young | |
| 7 | 1 | 1 | Yeah | Joe Nichols | |

=== Singles released by Canadian artists ===
| Songs | Airplay | Canada | Single | Artist | References |
|---|---|---|---|---|---|
| — | — | 3 | 3-2-1 | Brett Kissel | |
| — | — | 7 | Another Man's Gold | Dean Brody | |
| — | — | 11 | Cheap Wine and Cigarettes | Jess Moskaluke | |
| — | — | 8 | County Line | High Valley | |
| — | — | 13 | Crazy Enough | Bobby Wills | |
| — | — | 9 | Crop Circles | Dean Brody | |
| — | — | 10 | Fallin' Over You | Chad Brownlee | |
| — | — | 18 | Feels Like That | Jason Blaine | |
| — | — | 10 | Forever Summer | Paul Brandt | |
| — | — | 12 | Friends of Mine | Jason Blaine | |
| — | — | 9 | Get a Bed | Paul Brandt | |
| — | — | 12 | Get On Down the Road | The Road Hammers | |
| — | — | 6 | A Girl Like You | Dallas Smith | |
| — | — | 10 | Gone Enough | Kira Isabella | |
| — | — | 17 | Good Lovin' | Jess Moskaluke | |
| — | — | 14 | Got a Feeling | Tim Hicks | |
| — | — | 10 | Here Comes the Thunder | Tim Hicks | |
| — | — | 17 | If You Ask Me To | MacKenzie Porter | |
| — | — | 11 | Just Because | Chad Brownlee | |
| — | — | 13 | Mountain Man | Dean Brody | |
| — | — | 16 | Mud | The Road Hammers | |
| — | — | 14 | Never Didn't Love You | Bobby Wills | |
| — | — | 19 | Now I Do | Tebey | |
| — | — | 20 | Our Soundtrack | Wes Mack | |
| — | — | 17 | Pass It Around | Deric Ruttan | |
| — | — | 10 | Quarterback | Kira Isabella | |
| — | — | 7 | Raise Your Glass | Brett Kissel | |
| — | — | 10 | Rescue You | High Valley | |
| — | — | 5 | Slow Rollin' | Dallas Smith | |
| — | — | 20 | Some Songs | Terri Clark | |
| — | — | 12 | That's How I Like It | Doc Walker | |
| — | — | 5 | Tippin' Point | Dallas Smith | |
| — | — | 9 | Tough People Do | Brett Kissel | |
| — | 46 | 14 | Trippin' On Us | Lindsay Ell | |
| — | — | 10 | Unreal | Gord Bamford | |
| — | — | 13 | Used | Jess Moskaluke | |
| — | — | 5 | Wake Me Up | Tebey | |
| — | — | 8 | Where a Farm Used to Be | Gord Bamford | |

== Top new album releases ==
The following albums placed on the Top Country Albums charts in 2014:

| US | Album | Artist | Record label | Release date | Reference |
|---|---|---|---|---|---|
| 2 | 747 | Lady Antebellum | Capitol Nashville | September 30 | |
| 1 | 10,000 Towns | Eli Young Band | Republic Nashville | March 4 | |
| 6 | Angels Among Us: Hymns & Gospel Favorites | Alabama | Cracker Barrel | September 8 | |
| 1 | Anything Goes | Florida Georgia Line | Republic Nashville | October 14 | |
| 1 | Band of Brothers | Willie Nelson | Legacy | June 17 | |
| 1 | The Big Revival | Kenny Chesney | Blue Chair/Columbia | September 23 | |
| 2 | Blue Smoke | Dolly Parton | Dolly/Sony Masterworks | May 13 | |
| 1 | Bringing Back the Sunshine | Blake Shelton | Warner Bros. Nashville | September 30 | |
| 8 | Christmas with Nashville | Various Artists | Big Machine | November 4 | |
| 2 | Cole Swindell | Cole Swindell | Warner Bros. Nashville | February 18 | |
| 5 | Comin' Home (EP) | Jessie James Decker | 19 Recordings | April 18 | |
| 7 | Cowboy Like Me | Cody Johnson | Cody Johnson | January 14 | |
| 2 | The Cowboy Rides Away: Live from AT&T Stadium | George Strait | MCA Nashville | September 16 | |
| 8 | Crazy Life | Home Free | Columbia Nashville | January 14 | |
| 8 | Down Home Sessions (EP) | Cole Swindell | Warner Bros. Nashville | November 17 | |
| 10 | Early Morning Shakes | Whiskey Myers | Wiggy Thump | February 4 | |
| 4 | Eric Paslay | Eric Paslay | EMI Nashville | February 4 | |
| 1 | Everlasting | Martina McBride | Kobalt | April 8 | |
| 8 | Gravity | Big & Rich | Big & Rich | September 23 | |
| 1 | Greatest Hits: Decade #1 | Carrie Underwood | Arista Nashville | December 9 | |
| 3 | Greatest Hits So Far... | Zac Brown Band | Atlantic/Southern Ground | November 10 | |
| 3 | High Noon | Jerrod Niemann | Sea Gayle/Arista Nashville | March 25 | |
| 3 | Home for the Holidays | Darius Rucker | Capitol Nashville | October 27 | |
| 9 | How Country Are Ya? | Kevin Fowler | Kevin Fowler | March 4 | |
| 1 | I Don't Dance | Lee Brice | Curb | September 9 | |
| 3 | I'm a Fire | David Nail | MCA Nashville | March 4 | |
| 1 | Ignite the Night | Chase Rice | Dack Janiels/Columbia | August 19 | |
| 1 | Just as I Am | Brantley Gilbert | Valory Music Group | May 20 | |
| 6 | Kuntry Livin' | Big Smo | Elektra Nashville | June 3 | |
| 1 | Man Against Machine | Garth Brooks | RCA Nashville | November 11 | |
| 8 | Metamodern Sounds in Country Music | Sturgill Simpson | High Top Mountain | May 13 | |
| 1 | Montevallo | Sam Hunt | MCA Nashville | October 27 | |
| 1 | Moonshine in the Trunk | Brad Paisley | Arista Nashville | August 26 | |
| 8 | Mud Digger 5 | Various Artists | Average Joes | May 20 | |
| 4 | The Music of Nashville: Season 2, Volume 2 | Various Artists | Big Machine | May 6 | |
| 10 | The Music of Nashville: Season 3, Volume 1 | Various Artists | Big Machine | December 9 | |
| 2 | Nashville: On the Record | Various Artists | Big Machine | April 22 | |
| 2 | Nashville Outlaws: A Tribute to Mötley Crüe | Various Artists | Big Machine | August 19 | |
| 9 | Now That's What I Call Country Ballads 2 | Various Artists | Universal | January 21 | |
| 3 | Now That's What I Call Country Volume 7 | Various Artists | Universal | June 3 | |
| 5 | Official 2014 ACM Awards ZinePak | Various Artists | ZinePak LLC/Walmart | March 18 | |
| 1 | Old Boots, New Dirt | Jason Aldean | Broken Bow | October 7 | |
| 1 | Out Among the Stars | Johnny Cash | Columbia/Legacy | March 25 | |
| 1 | The Outsiders | Eric Church | EMI Nashville | February 11 | |
| 3 | Pain Killer | Little Big Town | Capitol Nashville | October 21 | |
| 1 | Platinum | Miranda Lambert | RCA Nashville | June 3 | |
| 7 | PrizeFighter: Hit After Hit | Trisha Yearwood | RCA Nashville | November 17 | |
| 4 | Remedy | Old Crow Medicine Show | ATO | July 1 | |
| 1 | Rewind | Rascal Flatts | Big Machine | May 13 | |
| 4 | Rhythm and Whiskey | Frank Foster | Lone Chief | September 2 | |
| 1 | Riser | Dierks Bentley | Capitol Nashville | February 25 | |
| 2 | The River & the Thread | Rosanne Cash | Blue Note | January 14 | |
| 4 | Road Between | Lucy Hale | DMG Nashville | June 3 | |
| 2 | Slow Me Down | Sara Evans | RCA Nashville | March 11 | |
| 7 | Southbound | The Doobie Brothers | Arista Nashville | November 4 | |
| 1 | Spring Break 6...Like We Ain't Ever | Luke Bryan | Capitol Nashville | March 11 | |
| 1 | Storyline | Hunter Hayes | Atlantic Nashville | May 6 | |
| 1 | Sundown Heaven Town | Tim McGraw | Big Machine | September 16 | |
| 5 | Sunshine & Whiskey | Frankie Ballard | Warner Bros. Nashville | February 11 | |
| 6 | The Swon Brothers | The Swon Brothers | Arista Nashville | October 14 | |
| 2 | Thanks for Listening | Colt Ford | Average Joes | July 1 | |
| 1 | That Girl | Jennifer Nettles | Mercury Nashville | January 14 | |
| 7 | Turn It Up | Josh Thompson | Show Dog-Universal Music | April 1 | |
| 9 | Wade Bowen | Wade Bowen | Amp | October 28 | |
| 1 | Where It All Began | Dan + Shay | Warner Bros. Nashville | April 1 | |
| 2 | Where It's At | Dustin Lynch | Broken Bow | September 9 | |
| 3 | Write You a Song | Jon Pardi | Capitol Nashville | January 14 | |
| 5 | X2C (EP) | Sam Hunt | MCA Nashville | August 12 | |

=== Other top albums ===
| US | Album | Artist | Record label | Release date | Reference |
|---|---|---|---|---|---|
| 12 | 4 Album Collection | Eric Church | EMI Nashville | February 11 | |
| 43 | 10 Great Songs: 20th Century Masters: The Millennium Collection | Trace Adkins | Universal | April 1 | |
| 43 | 10 Great Songs: 20th Century Masters: The Millennium Collection | Kenny Rogers | Universal | April 1 | |
| 20 | 21 Country Hits | Various Artists | Legacy | August 12 | |
| 29 | Alabama & Friends: At the Ryman | Alabama | Eagle Rock | September 30 | |
| 45 | All About That Life (EP) | Brian Davis | Twangville | October 30 | |
| 44 | All of My Memories: The John Denver Collection | John Denver | Legacy | November 4 | |
| 19 | Amazing Grace: 14 Treasured Hymns | Tennessee Ernie Ford | Gaither Music Group | July 22 | |
| 29 | American Middle Class | Angaleena Presley | Slate Creek | October 14 | |
| 39 | American Young (EP) | American Young | Curb | June 24 | |
| 21 | At Christmas | Sara Evans | RCA Nashville | November 17 | |
| 17 | Aviator | Stoney LaRue | eOne Entertainment | October 28 | |
| 34 | Bad Reputation | Mike Ryan | Rock & Soul | August 19 | |
| 22 | Beauty Is... The Final Sessions | Ray Price | AmeriMonte | April 15 | |
| 11 | The Best of Me Soundtrack | Various Artists | EMI Nashville | October 7 | |
| 11 | Bring Up the Sun | Sundy Best | eOne Entertainment | March 4 | |
| 44 | Brothers of the Southland | Blackhawk | Loud & Proud | July 8 | |
| 23 | Brothers Osborne (EP) | Brothers Osborne | EMI Nashville | September 9 | |
| 22 | Calicountry | Moonshine Bandits | Average Joes | February 4 | |
| 40 | Carter Girl | Carlene Carter | Rounder | April 8 | |
| 43 | The Christmas Song (EP) | Jamey Johnson | Big Gassed | November 19 | |
| 44 | Country Christmas | Various Artists | UMe | | |
| 13 | Country Classics: A Tapestry of Our Musical Heritage | Joey + Rory | Gaither Music Group | October 27 | |
| 50 | Dance Like You Don't Give A... | LeAnn Rimes | Curb | August 5 | |
| 45 | Daylight/Dark | Jason Eady | Old Guitar | January 21 | |
| 26 | December Day | Willie Nelson | Legacy | December 2 | |
| 34 | The Dirty River Boys | The Dirty River Boys | DRB Music | October 14 | |
| 37 | Do You Know Me: A Tribute to George Jones | Sammy Kershaw | 12 Street | July 22 | |
| 23 | Don't Wait Up (For George) (EP) | Shooter Jennings | Black Country Rock | August 5 | |
| 50 | Dylan Scott (EP) | Dylan Scott | Curb | February 11 | |
| 20 | Even the River Runs | Joel Crouse | Show Dog-Universal Music | August 19 | |
| 31 | Fish Grease | Danny Boone | Average Joes | June 10 | |
| 12 | Full of Cheer | Home Free | Columbia Nashville | October 27 | |
| 43 | The Garden Spot Programs, 1950 | Hank Williams | Omnivore | May 20 | |
| 49 | Glen Campbell: I'll Be Me (EP) | Various Artists | Big Machine | September 30 | |
| 25 | Going Down to the River | Doug Seegers | Rounder | October 7 | |
| 43 | Golden/Own the Night/Need You Now/Lady Antebellum | Lady Antebellum | Capitol Nashville | September 30 | |
| 17 | The Grind | Lenny Cooper | Average Joes | August 26 | |
| 17 | Hearts from Above | Micky & the Motorcars | Micky & the Motorcars | August 5 | |
| 11 | Homemade Tamales – Live at Floore's | Randy Rogers Band | Room 8 | April 15 | |
| 39 | Hymns: 17 Timeless Songs of Faith | Randy Travis | Word/Curb | June 3 | |
| 38 | Icon | Reba McEntire | MCA Nashville | August 5 | |
| 26 | Influence, Vol. 2: The Man I Am | Randy Travis | Warner Bros. Nashville | August 19 | |
| 11 | iTunes Session (EP) | Florida Georgia Line | Republic Nashville | January 14 | |
| 30 | Jones County | Demun Jones | Average Joes | June 10 | |
| 24 | The Journey (EP) | Jamie Lynn Spears | Sweet Jamie Music | May 27 | |
| 40 | Kelsea Ballerini (EP) | Kelsea Ballerini | Black River | November 24 | |
| 23 | Laughter's Good | Rodney Carrington | Laughter's Good | October 28 | |
| 17 | Leave a Scar, Live: North Carolina | Blackberry Smoke | 3 Legged | July 8 | |
| 47 | Let Her Go (EP) | Glen Templeton | Black River | July 29 | |
| 38 | Let It Go | Infamous Stringdusters | High Country | April 1 | |
| 39 | Lifted (EP) | Dallas Smith | Republic Nashville | November 25 | |
| 19 | Long in the Tooth | Billy Joe Shaver | Lightning Rod | August 5 | |
| 23 | Look Again to the Wind: Johnny Cash's Bitter Tears Revisited | Various Artists | Sony Masterworks | August 19 | |
| 19 | Love Story | Tim McGraw | Curb | February 4 | |
| 28 | Maddie & Tae (EP) | Maddie & Tae | Dot | November 4 | |
| 49 | Made on McCosh Mill Road | Bubba Sparxxx | eOne Entertainment | June 24 | |
| 37 | Maysville in the Meantime | Corey Smith | Undertone | December 2 | |
| 19 | Me | Jo Dee Messina | Dreambound | March 18 | |
| 48 | My Heroes Have Always Been Country | Gene Watson | Fourteen Carat | June 10 | |
| 14 | Nashville Christmas | Various Artists | Warner Bros. Nashville | | |
| 41 | Nashville: The Nashville Cast featuring Clare Bowen | Clare Bowen | Big Machine | April 22 | |
| 20 | Nothing in Particular | The Lacs | Backroad | October 28 | |
| 33 | Old Dominion (EP) | Old Dominion | ReeSmack | October 7 | |
| 20 | One Christmas: Chapter One | LeAnn Rimes | Iconic Entertainment | October 27 | |
| 36 | Only Me | Rhonda Vincent | Upper Management | January 28 | |
| 40 | Our Year | Bruce Robison and Kelly Willis | Premium | May 27 | |
| 32 | Outnumber Hunger: Help Feed Local Families Now (EP) | Various Artists | Big Machine | May 20 | |
| 38 | Playlist: The Very Best Country Hits | Various Artists | Legacy | September 23 | |
| 20 | Provoked | Sunny Sweeney | Aunt Daddy | August 5 | |
| 18 | Put Your Needle Down | The Secret Sisters | Republic Nashville | April 15 | |
| 37 | Ramblin' Man | Hank Williams III | Curb | April 1 | |
| 49 | Rebels on the Run (EP) | Moonshine Bandits | Backroad | September 30 | |
| 19 | Reflections | Don Williams | Sugar Hill | March 11 | |
| 40 | Rewind (EP) | Rascal Flatts | Big Machine | March 4 | |
| 50 | Right Where I Belong | Clayton Anderson | No Hassle Love Castle | February 18 | |
| 20 | Road Show | Roger Creager | Fun All Wrong | July 22 | |
| 27 | Rock & Roll Time | Jerry Lee Lewis | Vanguard | October 27 | |
| 22 | Salvation City | Sundy Best | eOne Entertainment | December 2 | |
| 30 | Sarah Davidson (EP) | Sarah Davidson | Suretone | March 25 | |
| 24 | Saturday Night / Sunday Morning | Marty Stuart | Superlatone | September 30 | |
| 35 | Simple Life (EP) | Megan and Liz | Hidden Cow | June 3 | |
| 44 | The Sound of Today: Country! | Various Artists | Sony Music | | |
| 22 | Tailgate Music | Jawga Boyz & Dez | D. Thrash | October 21 | |
| 25 | Tarpaper Sky | Rodney Crowell | New West | April 15 | |
| 31 | Tippin' Point (EP) | Dallas Smith | Republic Nashville | March 4 | |
| 12 | Tuesday Night (EP) | Josh Abbott Band | Atlantic Nashville | September 23 | |
| 36 | The Voice: The Complete Season 6 Collection | Jake Worthington | Republic Nashville | May 20 | |
| 35 | The Voice: The Complete Season 7 Collection | Craig Wayne Boyd | Republic Nashville | December 16 | |
| 18 | The Way I'm Livin' | Lee Ann Womack | Sugar Hill | September 23 | |
| 16 | Working Man's Poet: A Tribute to Merle Haggard | Various Artists | Broken Bow | April 1 | |

== Deaths ==
- January 3 – Phil Everly, 74, one-half of The Everly Brothers (Chronic obstructive pulmonary disease)
- January 19 – Steven Fromholz, 68, 2007 Poet Laureate of Texas (hunting accident)
- February 23 – Penny DeHaven, 65, best known for her 1970 hit "Land Mark Tavern" (cancer)
- February 26 – Tim Wilson, 52, comedian and singer frequently heard on The Bob & Tom Show (heart attack)
- April 3 – Arthur "Guitar Boogie" Smith, 93, guitarist and banjoist best known for "Guitar Boogie" and "Dueling Banjos"
- April 11 – Jesse Winchester, 69, Canadian country-folk singer-songwriter (cancer)
- April 19 – Kevin Sharp, 43, country singer from the 1990s, best known for "Nobody Knows" (stomach and digestive issues)
- April 22 – Mundo Earwood, 61, country singer from the 1970s and 1980s (pancreatic cancer)
- June 21 – Jimmy C. Newman, 86, country singer best known for his Cajun styled country music (cancer)
- September 17 – George Hamilton IV, 77, Grand Ole Opry star (heart attack)
- September 24 – Priscilla Mitchell, 73, singer and wife of Jerry Reed.
- October 18 – Paul Craft, 76, writer of hits for Bobby Bare, Mark Chesnutt, and others
- December 4 – Bob Montgomery, 77, songwriter, producer and music publisher (Parkinson's disease)
- December 11 – Dawn Sears, 53, backing vocalist for Vince Gill and member of The Time Jumpers (lung cancer)

== Hall of Fame Inductees ==
=== Bluegrass Music Hall of Fame Inductees ===
- Neil Rosenberg
- The Seldom Scene

=== Country Music Hall of Fame Inductees ===
- Hank Cochran (1935–2010)
- Mac Wiseman (born 1925)
- Ronnie Milsap (born 1943)

=== Canadian Country Music Hall of Fame Inductees ===
- Wendell Ferguson
- Ron Sakamoto

== Major awards ==
=== American Country Countdown Awards ===
(presented December 15 in Nashville)

- Artist of the Year – Jason Aldean
- Male Vocalist of the Year – Luke Bryan
- Female Vocalist of the Year – Miranda Lambert
- Group/Duo of the Year – Florida Georgia Line
- Song of the Year – "Beat of the Music", Brett Eldredge
- Collaboration of the Year – "This Is How We Roll", Florida Georgia Line featuring Luke Bryan
- Album of the Year – The Outsiders, Eric Church
- Digital Song of the Year – "This Is How We Roll", Florida Georgia Line featuring Luke Bryan
- Breakthrough Artist of the Year – Kip Moore

=== Academy of Country Music ===
(presented April 19, 2015 in Dallas)

- Entertainer of the Year – Luke Bryan
- Top Male Vocalist – Jason Aldean
- Top Female Vocalist – Miranda Lambert
- Top Vocal Group – Little Big Town
- Top Vocal Duo – Florida Georgia Line
- Top New Artist – Cole Swindell
- Album of the Year – Platinum, Miranda Lambert
- Single Record of the Year – "I Don't Dance", Lee Brice
- Song of the Year – "Automatic", Miranda Lambert
- Video of the Year – "Drunk on a Plane", Dierks Bentley
- Vocal Event of the Year – "This Is How We Roll", Florida Georgia Line feat. Luke Bryan

ACM Honors

- Career Achievement Award – Toby Keith
- Career Achievement Award – Ronnie Milsap
- Cliffie Stone Pioneer Award – Bob Beckham
- Crystal Milestone Award – Merle Haggard
- Gene Weed Special Achievement Award – Carrie Underwood
- Jim Reeves International Award – Rascal Flatts
- Jim Reeves International Award – Steve Buchanan
- Mae Boren Axton Award – Paul Moore
- Poet's Award – Kris Kristofferson
- Poet's Award – Dean Dillon
- Poet's Award – Buck Owens
- Poet's Award – Cowboy Jack Clement
- Songwriter of the Year – Shane McAnally

=== Americana Music Honors & Awards ===
- Album of the Year – Southeastern (Jason Isbell)
- Artist of the Year – Jason Isbell
- Duo/Group of the Year – The Milk Carton Kids
- Song of the Year – "Cover Me Up" (Jason Isbell)
- Emerging Artist of the Year – Sturgill Simpson
- Instrumentalist of the Year – Buddy Miller
- Spirit of Americana/Free Speech Award – Jackson Browne
- Lifetime Achievement: Songwriting – Loretta Lynn
- Lifetime Achievement: Performance – Taj Mahal
- Lifetime Achievement: Instrumentalist – Flaco Jiménez

=== American Music Awards ===
(presented November 23 in Los Angeles)

- Favorite Country Male Artist – Luke Bryan
- Favorite Country Female Artist – Carrie Underwood
- Favorite Country Band/Duo/Group – Florida Georgia Line
- Favorite Country Album – Just as I Am, Brantley Gilbert

=== ARIA Awards ===
(presented in Sydney on November 26, 2014)

- Best Country Album – Bittersweet (Kasey Chambers)
- ARIA Hall of Fame – Molly Meldrum

=== Canadian Country Music Association ===
(presented September 7 in Edmonton)

- Fans' Choice Award – Johnny Reid
- Male Artist of the Year – Gord Bamford
- Female Artist of the Year – Jess Moskaluke
- Group or Duo of the Year – Small Town Pistols
- Songwriter(s) of the Year – "Mine Would Be You", written by Jessi Alexander, Connie Harrington and Deric Ruttan
- Single of the Year – "When Your Lips Are So Close", Gord Bamford
- Album of the Year – Crop Circles, Dean Brody
- Top Selling Album – Here's to the Good Times, Florida Georgia Line
- Top Selling Canadian Album – A Christmas Gift to You, Johnny Reid
- CMT Video of the Year – "3-2-1", Brett Kissel
- Rising Star Award – Tim Hicks
- Roots Artist or Group of the Year – Lindi Ortega
- Interactive Artist of the Year – Brett Kissel

=== Country Music Association ===
(presented November 5 in Nashville)

- Single of the Year – "Automatic", Miranda Lambert
- Song of the Year – "Follow Your Arrow", Kacey Musgraves, Shane McAnally and Brandy Clark
- Vocal Group of the Year – Little Big Town
- New Artist of the Year – Brett Eldredge
- Album of the Year – Platinum, Miranda Lambert
- Musician of the Year – Mac McAnally
- Vocal Duo of the Year – Florida Georgia Line
- Music Video of the Year – "Drunk on a Plane", Dierks Bentley
- Male Vocalist of the Year – Blake Shelton
- Female Vocalist of the Year – Miranda Lambert
- Musical Event of the Year – "We Were Us", Keith Urban with Miranda Lambert
- Entertainer of the Year – Luke Bryan

=== CMT Music Awards ===
(presented June 4 in Nashville)

- Video of the Year – "See You Again", Carrie Underwood
- Male Video of the Year – "Doin' What She Likes", Blake Shelton
- Female Video of the Year – "Automatic", Miranda Lambert
- Group Video of the Year – "Done", The Band Perry
- Duo Video of the Year – "Round Here", Florida Georgia Line
- Breakthrough Video of the Year – "Wasting All These Tears", Cassadee Pope
- Collaborative Video of the Year – "This Is How We Roll", Florida Georgia Line featuring Luke Bryan
- Performance of the Year – "Oh No/All Night Long (All Night)", Luke Bryan and Lionel Richie from 2013 CMT Artists of the Year
- CMT Impact Award – Alan Jackson

CMT Artists of the Year
(presented December 2 in Nashville)

- Jason Aldean
- Luke Bryan
- Florida Georgia Line
- Miranda Lambert
- Keith Urban

=== Grammy Awards ===
(presented February 8, 2015 in Los Angeles)

- Best Country Solo Performance – "Something in the Water" (Carrie Underwood)
- Best Country Duo/Group Performance – "Gentle on My Mind" (The Band Perry)
- Best Country Song – "I'm Not Gonna Miss You" (Glen Campbell)
- Best Country Album – Platinum (Miranda Lambert)
- Best Bluegrass Album – The Earls of Leicester (The Earls of Leicester)
- Best Americana Album – The River and the Thread (Rosanne Cash)
- Best American Roots Performance – "A Feather's Not a Bird" (Rosanne Cash)
- Best American Roots Song – "A Feather's Not a Bird" (Rosanne Cash, John Leventhal)
- Best Roots Gospel Album – Shine for All the People (Mike Farris)

=== Juno Awards ===
(presented March 15, 2015 in Hamilton)

- Country Album of the Year – Lifted, Dallas Smith

=== Hollywood Walk of Fame ===
Stars who were honored in 2014

John Denver

== See also ==
- Country Music Association
- Inductees of the Country Music Hall of Fame
