= 2014 iHeartRadio Music Awards =

US music awards ceremony in 2014

- Date: Thursday, May 1, 2014
- Location: Shrine Auditorium, Los Angeles
- Most awards: Rihanna (4)
- Most nominations: Rihanna (8)

Television/radio coverage
- Network: NBC

The 2014 iHeartRadio Music Awards was the inaugural music award show presented by iHeartMedia's platform iHeartRadio and NBC. The awards were held on May 1, 2014, at the Shrine Auditorium in Los Angeles. The awards show was announced on February 26, 2014. The nominations were compiled by the results of Mediabase charts, listener feedback and digital streaming data from the iHeartRadio platform and announced on March 26, 2014. The awards recognized the biggest artists and songs of the year. The show was directed by Hamish Hamilton. The voting took place on iHeartRadio's official webpage except for the "Instagram Award", where voting took place on social network Instagram.

Rihanna led the nominations with eight and also became the biggest winner of the night with four wins including Artist of the Year and Song of the Year.

NBC's telecast of the iHeartRadio Music Awards drew 5.4 million viewers overall and a rating of 1.7 in the key 18-to-49-year-old demographic.

== Performances ==
Presenter(s)	Artist(s)	Song(s)
	Pitbull; G.R.L.	"Wild Wild Love" "Timber"
Blake Shelton	Luke Bryan	"That's My Kind of Night"
Adam Lambert	Bastille	"Pompeii"
Ashley Greene	Ed Sheeran	"The A Team" "Don't"
Lil Jon	Ariana Grande	"The Way" "Problem"
L.A. Reid	Usher	Dance to "Love Never Felt So Good"
Dan Reynolds	Kendrick Lamar	"California Love" "M.A.A.D City"
Chester Bennington	Thirty Seconds to Mars	"City of Angels"
Juanes	Shakira	"Empire"
Shakira	Blake Shelton	"Doin' What She Likes"
	Arcade Fire	"Normal Person"
Gwen Stefani	Pharrell Williams	"Come Get It Bae" "Blurred Lines" "Get Lucky" "Happy"

== Presenters ==
- Pitbull — Presented Hip-Hop/R&B Song of the Year
- Selena Gomez — Presented Tribute of Female Artist
- Blake Shelton — Introduced Luke Bryan
- Pharrell Williams — Best Collaboration
- Adam Lambert — Introduced Bastille
- Lionel Richie — Presented Best Lyrics
- Ashley Greene — Introduced Ed Sheeran
- Lil Jon— Introduced Ariana Grande
- Jared Leto — Presented Best New Artist
- L.A. Reid — Introduced Usher
- Mel B — Presented Best Fan Army
- Dan Reynolds — Introduced Kendrick Lamar
- Jason Ritter — Presented iHeartRadio Instagram Award
- Hilary Duff — Presented iHeartRadio Young Influencer Award
- Joe Manganiello — Presented Alternative Rock Song of the Year
- Chester Bennington — Introduced Thirty Seconds To Mars
- Sean "Diddy" Combs — Presented Song of the Year
- Juanes — Introduced Shakira
- Bobby Bones — Presented Country Song of the Year
- Shakira — Introduced Blake Shelton
- Juicy J — Presented EDM Song of the Year
- Gwen Stefani — Presented iHeartRadio Innovator Award
- Jennifer Lopez and Ryan Seacrest — Presented Artist of the Year

== Winners and nominees ==
Artist of the Year (presented by Jennifer Lopez and Ryan Seacrest)	Song of the Year (presented by Sean Combs)
Rihanna; Imagine Dragons; Justin Timberlake; Macklemore & Ryan Lewis; Maroon 5	Rihanna featuring Mikky Ekko - "Stay"; Drake featuring Majid Jordan - "Hold On, We're Going Home"; Eminem featuring Rihanna - "The Monster"; Imagine Dragons - "Radioactive"; Justin Timberlake - "Mirrors"
Hip-Hop/R&B Song of the Year (presented by Pitbull)	EDM Song of the Year (presented by Juicy J)
Rihanna - "Pour It Up"; Drake featuring Majid Jordan - "Hold On, We're Going Home"; Drake - "Started from the Bottom"; Jay-Z featuring Justin Timberlake - "Holy Grail"; Robin Thicke featuring Pharrell Williams and T.I. - "Blurred Lines"	Avicii - "Wake Me Up"; Calvin Harris featuring Florence Welch - "Sweet Nothing"; Daft Punk featuring Pharrell Williams - "Get Lucky"; Lana Del Rey and Cedric Gervais - "Summertime Sadness" (Remix); Zedd featuring Hayley Williams - "Stay the Night"
Country Song of the Year (presented by Bobby Bones)	Alternative Rock Song of the Year (presented by Joe Manganiello)
Blake Shelton - "Boys 'Round Here"; Blake Shelton - "Mine Would Be You"; Luke Bryan - "That's My Kind of Night"; Thomas Rhett - "It Goes Like This"; Tim McGraw featuring Taylor Swift and Keith Urban - "Highway Don't Care"	Imagine Dragons - "Demons"; Arctic Monkeys - "Do I Wanna Know?"; Bastille - "Pompeii"; Capital Cities - "Safe and Sound"; Lorde - "Royals"
Best Collaboration (presented by Pharrell Williams)	Best Fan Army (presented by Mel B)
Pitbull featuring Kesha - "Timber"; Eminem featuring Rihanna - "The Monster"; Jay-Z featuring Justin Timberlake - "Holy Grail"; Justin Timberlake featuring Jay-Z - "Suit & Tie"; Rihanna featuring Mikky Ekko - "Stay"	Rihanna - Rihanna Navy; Ariana Grande - Arianators; Austin Mahone - Mahomies; Demi Lovato - Lovatics; Lady Gaga - Little Monsters; Taylor Swift - Swifties
Best Lyrics (presented by Lionel Richie)	Best New Artist (presented by Jared Leto)
Miley Cyrus - "Wrecking Ball"; Avicii - "Wake Me Up"; A Great Big World and Christina Aguilera - "Say Something"; Icona Pop featuring Charli XCX - "I Love It"; Macklemore & Ryan Lewis - "Same Love"	Lorde; Florida Georgia Line; Icona Pop; Imagine Dragons; Macklemore & Ryan Lewis; Passenger
Instagram Award (presented by Jason Ritter)
Austin Mahone; Ariana Grande; Harry Styles; Rihanna; Selena Gomez
iHeartRadio Young Influencer Award (presented by Hilary Duff)
Ariana Grande
iHeartRadio Innovator Award (presented by Gwen Stefani)
Pharrell Williams

== Multiple nominations and awards ==
Artists that received multiple nominations
Nominations	Artist
8	Rihanna
5	Justin Timberlake
4	Imagine Dragons
3	Drake
3	Jay-Z
3	Macklemore & Ryan Lewis
3	Pharrell Williams
2	Ariana Grande
2	Austin Mahone
2	Avicii
2	Blake Shelton
2	Eminem
2	Icona Pop
2	Lorde
2	Majid Jordan
2	Mikky Ekko
2	Taylor Swift

Artists that received multiple awards
Awards	Artist
4	Rihanna
