= Based on a True Story... =

Studio album by Blake Shelton
- Released: March 26, 2013
- Recorded: 2013
- Studio: Ocean Way, Nashville
- Genre: Country
- Length: 43:53
- Label: Warner Bros. Nashville
- Producer: Scott Hendricks

Blake Shelton chronology
Cheers, It's Christmas (2012)	Based on a True Story... (2013)	Bringing Back the Sunshine (2014)

Singles from Based on a True Story...
- 1. "Sure Be Cool If You Did" Released: January 7, 2013; 2. "Boys 'Round Here" Released: March 26, 2013; 3. "Mine Would Be You" Released: July 22, 2013; 4. "Doin' What She Likes" Released: January 6, 2014; 5. "My Eyes" Released: April 14, 2014

Based on a True Story... is the eighth studio album by American country music artist Blake Shelton. It was released on March 26, 2013, through Warner Bros. Records, and debuted at #3 on the Billboard 200. In a career best for Shelton at the time, nearly 200,000 copies of the album were sold in its first week. Based on a True Story... became the ninth best-selling album of 2013 in the US, earning Shelton a Platinum certification by the RIAA on September 30, 2013. In 2016, Based on a True Story… was certified double-platinum by the RIAA.

Five singles were released from Based on a True Story... The lead single, "Sure Be Cool If You Did", peaked at #1 on Billboard's Hot Country Songs chart, while the subsequent two singles, "Boys 'Round Here" and "Mine Would Be You", peaked at #2 on that chart. The final two singles, "Doin' What She Likes", and "My Eyes", peaked at #3 and #4 respectively on that chart. All five singles peaked at #1 on the Billboard's Country Airplay chart.

Based on a True Story... received mixed reviews from critics. Shelton's vocals on the album were praised, and some of the songs were well-received for highlighting Shelton's personality, but several critics considered the album's lyrical content formulaic. The album earned Shelton his second Grammy Award nomination for Best Country Album. The song "Mine Would Be You" earned Shelton his third Grammy Award nomination for Best Country Solo Performance.

== Background ==
Although Shelton had already been a judge on The Voice for one season before the release of his 2011 album Red River Blue, Based on a True Story... was, according to Stephen Thomas Erlewine of AllMusic, the first album recorded by Shelton "since turning into a genuine crossover star thanks to his role on [that series]." Matt Bjorke of Roughstock noted that Based on a True Story... was also "the first album released by [Shelton] after his monumental CMA Entertainer of the Year award from 2012", which he felt led to the album having uniquely high expectations placed on it.

== Content ==
Explaining the title of Based on a True Story... Shelton said, "I just think that every song on the album, I've either been in those situations before or I'm going through 'em right now. There’s songs like 'Doing What She Likes' and 'Ten Times Crazier' that are kind of where I’m at right now...I always feel like I cop out whenever I name an album after a song on the album. I always end up looking back going, 'Man, you wimped out there.' And so I listened to it and finally thought, 'Man, it kind of is my life, from start to finish.' I thought, 'That's just what we'll call it—we'll just say it's based on a true story.' And normally my ideas like that don't stick, but somehow that one got through."

The album mostly features upbeat songs, which Shelton acknowledged by saying, "Outside of a couple of ballads, it's a pretty light album...all these songs are kind of about this guy that's whipped. I really am happy, and it's coming through on the album." He contrasted this with his previous releases, saying, "I think that I’ve had those years where I made those type of [wistful] records, and I don’t want to now. Something will happen one of these days and it will be a part of my music again. But right now, everything’s pretty awesome."

The album's lead single, "Sure Be Cool If You Did", reached the top of the Billboard Hot Country Songs chart faster than any of Shelton’s previous singles. Shelton described the song as indicative of where he wanted to be "going musically" and compared its production to that of songs by artists like Jason Aldean, Luke Bryan, and Carrie Underwood.

The album's second single and opening track, "Boys 'Round Here", features Shelton's then wife, Miranda Lambert, as part of her musical group Pistol Annies. The song's vocals are credited to Shelton along with "Pistol Annies & Friends". Additional vocals on the track are by RaeLynn, who had been a contestant on The Voice, Scott Hendricks, who produced Based on a True Story, and the writers of "Boys 'Round Here", Rhett Akins, Dallas Davidson, and Craig Wiseman. Hendricks identified "Boys 'Round Here" as "probably [both his and Shelton's] favorite song on the record."

Shelton described the album's third single, "Mine Would Be You", as "one of the best songs" he ever recorded and said at the time of Based on a True Story...'s release that he associated the album's fourth single, "Doin' What She Likes", with his then-marriage to Lambert. The album's fifth single, "My Eyes", features Gwen Sebastian, who was mentored by Shelton on season two of The Voice. Before recording "My Eyes" with Shelton, Sebastian had toured with him as a background singer.

Shelton described "Still Got a Finger" as "like a new version of 'Take This Job And Shove It' and said, "It’s just a little edgier with the language, probably, and that’s the only difference...it’s fun to sing about stuff like that when you’re mad and in that mood." He felt that the song acted as a type of wish fulfillment, saying of the song's narrative, "nobody ever really does that, but we all wish we could."

"Grandaddy's Gun" was previously recorded by Rhett Akins on the 2010 album, Michael Waddell's Bone Collector: The Brotherhood Album and by Staind singer Aaron Lewis on his 2012 debut country album, The Road. Lewis's version was released as a single to country radio in 2013 and peaked at No. 46 on the Billboard Country Airplay chart.

== Critical reception ==
Professional ratings
Aggregate scores
Source	Rating
Metacritic	(64/100)
Review scores
Source	Rating
AllMusic	3/5 stars
Billboard	79/100
Country Weekly	C+
Entertainment Weekly	B−
Los Angeles Times	2.5/4 stars
The Oakland Press	3/4 stars
Roughstock	4/5 stars
Taste of Country	4/5 stars
USA Today	3.5/4 stars
Country Universe	1.5/5 stars

Based on a True Story… received mixed reviews from critics. At Metacritic, a website which assigns a normalised rating out of 100 from reviews by mainstream critics, it holds a rating of 64 based on 5 reviews.

Stephen Thomas Erlewine of AllMusic felt that Based on a True Story... represented a shift towards more mainstream sounds compared to the music recorded by Shelton earlier in his career, writing, "few other country albums of 2012-2013 are as unabashedly of the moment as this." He attributed the artistic direction of Based on a True Story... to Shelton's increasing popularity on The Voice. While he found Shelton's "big, swinging bravado" convincing throughout the album and conceded that "the very sense that more is more is essential to the appeal", he concluded that "there's just a little bit too much of the schtick; individually the cuts work fine but they overwhelm not only the gentler moments...but cancel each other out over the long run."

Suggesting that Shelton should have written on the album, Joseph Hudak of Country Weekly considered many of the songs to be lyrically uninspired and wrote that much of the album feels "rushed, as if The Voice coach hurriedly picked songs to record in Nashville before he had to catch his flight back to L.A." Nonetheless, Hudak wrote that the album "does have truly inspired moments." He praised the album's ballads, saying that those are where "Blake excels and the avowed smart aleck is found with his heart on his denim sleeve."

Concurring that the album comes across as rushed, Mikael Wood of the Los Angeles Times compared Based on a True Story... to Shelton's 2011 album Red River Blue, writing that both releases come across as though they were "recorded in the rear lounge of a private jet zooming back and forth between Nashville and L.A." He characterized the album's first two singles, "Sure Be Cool If You Did" and "Boys 'Round Here", as unremarkable and wrote that "Shelton's investment" in the album "seems about as minimal as possible", but wrote, "it’s a testament to [Shelton's] considerable charm that Based on a True Story … never feels like a con. With its easy rhymes and hummable choruses, the album doesn’t ask the listener to work any harder than Shelton himself is prepared to work."

In her review of the album for Entertainment Weekly, Melissa Maerz wrote that Shelton excels on the songs that "find him acting as Nashville’s cultural ambassador to Hollywood." She named "Boys 'Round Here" and "Small Town Big Time" as examples of this and complimented Shelton as "plenty charming on the funny songs" but felt that his attempts at serious and romantic songs were unsuccessful, writing, "Shelton’s just not a gravitas kind of guy, and the outdated production only makes it harder to take his songs seriously, especially with the talk-box-style guitar effects".

Describing Shelton as "the reigning king of pop country", Sarah Rodman of The Boston Globe noted that Based on a True Story... contains "good-time, paint-by-numbers singalongs...novelty chucklers...earnest ballads...and any other popular country trope" that can be "deployed for maximum radio play." She considered the album's title a misnomer, expressing that Based on a True Story... "doesn’t offer enough personal touches to distinguish it from a lot of other tales coming out of Nashville", and wrote, "Much of it is perfectly acceptable. All of it is executed competently. But only a little of [it is] truly compelling."

[Shelton] asks at one point if we 'wonder why country songs say the same old thing,' but when they’re sung this well, we pretty much have our answer."

— Gary Graff in his review of the album for The Oakland Press,

Gary Graff of The Oakland Press felt that Based on a True Story... feels authentic despite Shelton's lack of writing credits on the album, arguing that "a top-shelf crew of Nashville’s best...clearly know how to craft songs that are true to Shelton’s character." Roughstock's Matt Bjorke praised Based on a True Story... as "a strong, current record with a couple of moments that demand repeated attention." Jon Caramanica of The New York Times called the album "one of [Shelton's] strongest" and praised it as a showcase of "Shelton’s ability to appear to be adhering to country’s core values and subverting them all at once."

Sam Gazdziak of Country Universe panned Based on a True Story..., describing it as an unworthy release from an artist who at the time was "the reigning Male Vocalist of the Year for both the ACM and CMA Awards, as well as the CMA Entertainer of the Year." Characterizing the album as "largely pop music, with some R&B and adult contemporary elements thrown in the mix", Gadziak derided Shelton's musical direction as "ideal...for people who like Shelton as a famous personality but don’t really care for country music." He acknowledged that this style had become commonplace among contemporary country artists, but called Based on a True Story...'s songs "pedestrian and unmemorable", voicing a preference for Shelton's earlier, more traditional songs, such as "Ol' Red" and "Austin".

Noting that Shelton had recently "offended" the "old guard" with controversial comments about the evolution of country music, Jerry Shriver of USA Today wrote that Based on a True Story... "puts [Shelton's] very legitimate argument into a fuller and highly entertaining context." Shriver noted that the album's modern sound is "now common in mainstream country" but felt that Shelton "sells his version more convincingly" than many of his contemporaries "via exceptional, steering-wheel-slapping, sing-along-inducing, bedroom-inviting material — and that punchy-not-pretty baritone voice."

"The emotion is easy to overlook on a single pass, but second or third listens find a collection of songs that really stick to the soul."

— Billy Dukes in his review of the album for Taste of Country,

In his review for Taste of Country, Billy Dukes wrote that the album's "best moments...sizzle, and not in that ironic "bow-chicka-wow-wow" sort of way that's occasionally implied with this singer's sense of humor." With the exception of "Boys 'Round Here", which he described as a highlight, he considered the album's second half superior to its first half, naming "Mine Would Be You" as the album's best song, while characterizing the tracks "Do You Remember" and "Small Town Big Time" as "nondescript and generic." Although he acknowledged that the album's "range of subject matter is limited", he felt that Shelton enlivens many of the songs with "a dynamic mix of vocal styles and deliveries."

"I Still Got a Finger" and "Granddaddy's Gun" were considered highlights among Based on a True Story...'s album tracks by several critics. Hudak wrote of the former song, "Blake finally finds the country kiss-off he’s been searching for since, well, “Kiss My Country Ass” with the bawdy...21st-century equivalent of Johnny Paycheck’s “Take This Job and Shove It.” Chuck Dauphin of Billboard wrote that the song demonstrates "Shelton at his irreverent finest" and suggested that it should have been released as a single. Maerz wrote that it "might be the best" track on the album. Bjorke called the song "timeless" and felt that it represented Shelton taking a "chance". Gazdziak called it "one of the few instances where the feisty Blake Shelton of old – before he became famous outside of country music circles – makes an appearance" though he was less complimentary than others, writing that the song "has the feel of being forced, as if it was made to highlight Shelton’s smartass, uncensored Twitter personality without being too rude for a large audience."

"Granddaddy's Gun" was praised by Gazdziak, who wrote, "Without pushing one side of the gun control debate like an Aaron Lewis or Charlie Daniels would do, Shelton sings about the sentimental value of an old battered shotgun and demonstrates that he is still an outstanding country singer when he wants to be." Graff called the song "sentimental without getting too cornpone." Rodman wrote that she considered the "closing, dusty story song" to be one of the album's few standouts, while Hudak wrote that "the oft-recorded hunting ode" is among the album's best tracks. Dauphin wrote that the song "allows Shelton to slide into the storytelling vein that he so often excels at, and the result might be his most moving cut since "The Baby." In contrast, Maerz was critical of the song, writing, "it feels a little strange to hear [Shelton] sounding so straightfaced about his love of shooting" and joking, "Well, if those watermelon candles don’t work on his lady, at least he can seduce his gun."

The guitars are loud and crankin,’ and so is the attitude. This cut could very well be the hit of the summer on country radio — it’s just got that “roll down the window” feel. It almost makes you wonder if Shelton’s not missing Oklahoma just a little while he’s doing The Voice.

— Chuck Dauphin of Billboard on his opinion of "Small Town Big Time",

Several reviews criticized Shelton's use of Auto-Tune on "Small Town Big Time". Maerz called the choice "ill-advised", and Hudak called it "an aesthetic effect that isn’t necessary for the reigning CMA Male Vocalist", though he complimented the song itself as "full of fun, swagger and swerve". Gazdziak criticized the song as a whole, calling it "essentially the same song as half of Jason Aldean’s back catalog – the bad half." Erlewine called the use of Auto-Tune on the song "a bit of trickery [Shelton] doesn't need". Bjorke noted that Auto-Tune is used "to help prove a lyrical point (as a sort of plot device)", but recognized that the choice would lead classic country fans to "scoff" at the song.

"Do You Remember" was praised by Hudak, who called it "a beautiful ballad", and by Dauphin, who wrote, "Shelton has always had his way with a ballad, and he scores on this touching song about looking back when a love was stronger." Both critics also praised "Lay Low". Hudak described that song as "refreshingly ’70s-sounding" and likened it to the works of Gary Stewart. Dauphin called the song "maybe the most entertaining cut on the album". He praised the song's "fiddle and steel work" and wrote that the song reminded him of "80s country, a la Conway Twitty". "Ten Times Crazier" was praised by Hudak, who called it "a singalong deserving of its status as the name of Blake’s upcoming tour." The song was criticized by Wood however, who felt that it demanded a more passionate vocal performance, describing Shelton's delivery as too "laid-back" for the lyrics.

== Commercial performance ==
The album debuted at No.1 on the Top Country Albums chart and No. 3 on the Billboard 200, selling 199,000 copies for the week. The album became the ninth best-selling album of 2013 in the United States, with 1,109,000 copies sold for the year. As of March 2015, the album has sold a total of 1.46 million copies in the United States. In 2016, it was certified double-platinum with sales of 2,000,000 units.

== Track listing ==
No.	Title	Writer(s)	Length
1.	"Boys 'Round Here" (featuring Pistol Annies and Friends)	Rhett Akins; Dallas Davidson; Craig Wiseman	4:48
2.	"Sure Be Cool If You Did"	Rodney Clawson; Jimmy Robbins; Chris Tompkins	3:35
3.	"Do You Remember"	Michael Dulaney; William Gray; Ian Kirkpatrick	3:29
4.	"Small Town Big Time"	Wiseman; Clint Lagerberg	3:50
5.	"Country on the Radio"	Clawson; Tompkins; Wiseman	3:52
6.	"My Eyes" (featuring Gwen Sebastian)	Andrew Dorff; Tommy Lee James; Josh Osborne	3:10
7.	"Doin' What She Likes"	Wade Kirby; Phil O'Donnell	3:42
8.	"I Still Got a Finger"	Wiseman; Gary Hannan	3:38
9.	"Mine Would Be You"	Jessi Alexander; Connie Harrington; Deric Ruttan	3:59
10.	"Lay Low"	Dean Dillon; Tim Nichols; Dave Turnbull	3:13
11.	"Ten Times Crazier"	Akins; Marv Green; Ben Hayslip	3:03
12.	"Granddaddy's Gun"	Akins; Davidson; Bobby Pinson	3:34
Total length:			43:53

Deluxe edition
No.	Title	Writer(s)	Length
13.	"I Found Someone"	Hayslip; Akins	3:22
14.	"Frame of Mine"	Blake Shelton; Charles Quillen	3:21

iTunes deluxe edition
No.	Title	Writer(s)	Length
15.	"Sure Be Cool If You Did" (music video)	Robbins; Tompkins; Clawson	3:32

== Personnel ==
Vocals

- Rhett Akins – backing vocals
- Rodney Clawson – backing vocals
- Perry Coleman – backing vocals
- Dallas Davidson – backing vocals
- Scott Hendricks – backing vocals
- Wes Hightower – backing vocals
- RaeLynn – backing vocals
- Pistol Annies – backing vocals on "Boys 'Round Here"
- Gwen Sebastian – backing vocals on "My Eyes"
- Blake Shelton – lead vocals

Musicians

- Tom Bukovac – electric guitar
- Paul Franklin – pedal steel guitar
- Tommy Harden – drum loops
- Aubrey Haynie – fiddle
- Charlie Judge – synthesizers, Hammond B3 organ, loops
- Troy Lancaster – electric guitar
- Greg Morrow – drums, percussion
- Gordon Mote – acoustic piano, Wurlitzer electric piano, Hammond B3 organ
- Russ Pahl – lap steel guitar, pedal steel guitar
- Danny Parks – acoustic guitar, banjo
- Ben Phillips – percussion
- Jimmy Robbins – programming
- Adam Shoenfeld – electric guitar
- Jimmie Lee Sloas – bass
- Bryan Sutton – acoustic guitar, acoustic slide guitar, 12-string acoustic guitar
- Chris Tompkins – programming
- John Willis – banjo

Production

- Brady Barnett – digital editing
- Brandon Blackstock – management
- Narvel Blackstock – management
- Drew Bollman – recording, recording assistant, mix assistant
- Amanda Craig – grooming
- Sally Carnes Gulde – design
- Scott Hendricks – producer, overdub recording, digital editing
- Charles Henry – landscape photography
- Sandra Johnson – photography
- Scott Johnson – production assistant
- Joe Martino – overdub assistant
- Justin Niebank – recording, mixing
- Allen Parker – recording assistant
- Katherine Petillo – art direction
- Ben Phillips – digital editing
- Shutterstock – landscape photography
- Mike Stankiewicz – overdub assistant
- Peter Strickland – brand management
- Shane Tarleton – creative direction
- Trish Townsend – wardrobe
- Hank Williams – mastering
- Brian David Willis – digital editing
- Brad Winters – overdub assistant

Studios

- Recorded at Ocean Way (Nashville, Tennessee).
- Overdubbed at Ocean Way Recording, Sound Emporium, Cinema Sauna, Villahona Resort, Riverview Back Porch Studio and Warner Bros. Studio B.
- Mixed at Hound's Ear Studio (Franklin, Tennessee) and Blackbird Studio (Nashville, Tennessee).
- Mastered at MasterMix (Nashville, Tennessee).

== Charts and certifications ==
=== Weekly charts ===
Chart (2013)	Peak position
Australian Albums (ARIA)	38
Australian Country Albums (ARIA)	3
Canadian Albums (Billboard)	3
US Billboard 200	3
US Top Country Albums (Billboard)	1
US Top Current Albums (Billboard)	3

=== Year-end charts ===
Chart (2013)	Position
Canadian Albums (Billboard)	50
US Billboard 200	17
US Top Country Albums (Billboard)	4

Chart (2014)	Position
US Billboard 200	39
US Top Country Albums (Billboard)	9

Chart (2015)	Position
US Billboard 200	143

=== Singles ===
Year	Single	Peak chart positions				
Year	Single	US Country	US Country Airplay	US	CAN Country	CAN
2013	"Sure Be Cool If You Did"	1	1	24	1	32
2013	"Boys 'Round Here"	2	1	12	1	12
2013	"Mine Would Be You"	2	1	28	1	35
2014	"Doin' What She Likes"	3	1	35	1	35
2014	"My Eyes"	4	1	39	1	39

=== Decade-end charts ===
Chart (2010–2019)	Position
US Billboard 200	51
US Top Country Albums (Billboard)	14

=== Certifications ===
Region	Certification	Certified units/sales
Canada (Music Canada)	Platinum	80,000^{^}
United States (RIAA)	3× Platinum	3,000,000^{‡}
^{^} Shipments figures based on certification alone.^{‡} Sales+streaming figures based on certification alone.
