= Hillbilly Bone (song) =

Single by Blake Shelton featuring Trace Adkins

from the EP Hillbilly Bone
- Released: October 24, 2009
- Genre: Country
- Length: 3:44
- Label: Warner Bros. Nashville; Reprise Nashville
- Songwriter(s): Luke Laird; Craig Wiseman
- Producer(s): Scott Hendricks

Blake Shelton singles chronology
"I'll Just Hold On" (2009)	"Hillbilly Bone" (2009)	"All About Tonight" (2010)

Trace Adkins singles chronology
"All I Ask For Anymore" (2009)	"Hillbilly Bone" (2009)	"Ala-Freakin-Bama" (2010)

Music video
- "Hillbilly Bone" at CMT.com

"Hillbilly Bone" is a song written by Luke Laird and Craig Wiseman and recorded by American country music artist Blake Shelton for his extended play Hillbilly Bone. The song features guest vocals from Trace Adkins, and its chart run overlapped with his singles "All I Ask For Anymore" and "Ala-Freakin-Bama".

The song won the 2010 Academy of Country Music award for "Vocal Event of the Year", giving Shelton his first Academy of Country Music award. Adkins included the song on the deluxe edition of his album, Cowboy's Back in Town, which was released on August 17, 2010.

== Content ==
"Hillbilly Bone" is an up-tempo country song, backed primarily by electric guitar. It has a theme of rural pride, in which the narrators state that one does not have to be from the South or Appalachia to enjoy the same pastimes as someone who is ("We all got a hillbilly bone down deep inside"). The song is set in the key of G major with a main chord pattern of G-C7-E♭7-C-G. An eight-bar electric guitar solo precedes each verse and the final chorus. Adkins sings vocal harmony on the entire song, and the last half of the second verse.

Craig Wiseman and Luke Laird wrote "Hillbilly Bone" during a songwriting session in which neither of them were able to come up with a song idea. Laird then began performing an improvised rap as a joke. After Laird wrote the opening couplet "Yeah, I got a friend in New York City / He's never heard of Conway Twitty", the two finished the song within two hours.

== History ==
Shelton said that he was listening to a demo disc in his car, and when he first heard the demo for "Hillbilly Bone", he did not think that it was suitable for him, so he skipped to the next song on the disc. Later on, when the disc restarted, Shelton said that the demo "hit [him] way better" the second time he heard it, and that he liked it more each subsequent time that he listened to it. Shelton also thought that it sounded "like something Trace Adkins would cut", and asked producer Scott Hendricks to bring Adkins in to sing it as a duet.

== Critical reception ==
The song has been met with generally positive reception from music critics. Tara Seetharam of Country Universe gave the song a B rating, saying that it "is a novelty song through and through, but it's catchy and dynamic, and it laughs at itself." She also wrote that Shelton and Adkins were an "interesting combination of voices and attitude". Country Weekly reviewer Chris Neal gave it three-and-a-half stars out of five, comparing it positively to other similarly themed songs about rural pride: "[A]t a moment when most of these 'I'm-so-country' songs take a sharply superior attitude toward urbanity, this song says we're all essentially alike[.]" He also thought that Shelton's and Adkins' voices contrasted well. Bobby Peacock, writing for Roughstock, also said that it was "way more tolerable than almost any other in the recent deluge of like-themed songs" and described the "high-low harmony" of Adkins' and Shelton's voices favorably. 411 Mania reviewer Mark Ingoldsby was less favorable, giving the song one star out of five, calling it "one more dopey collection of textbook southern culture icons and expressions that is completely predictable and painfully cliché."

== Commercial performance ==
"Hillbilly Bone" debuted at number 51 on the US Billboard Hot Country Songs chart, while Adkins' own single "All I Ask For Anymore" was still charting. The song also debuted at number 65 on the US Billboard Hot 100 for the chart week of January 9, 2010. It became Shelton's sixth Number One and Adkins' fourth and final Number One on the Hot Country Songs chart week of March 27, 2010. The song began a streak of seventeen consecutive number one hits for Shelton. This streak ended in 2016, when his single, "She's Got a Way with Words", peaked at number 7 on the Billboard Country Airplay chart and number 8 on the Billboard Hot Country Songs chart.

== Music video ==
The video, which was directed by Roman White, premiered on CMT on October 31, 2009. In the video, Shelton and Adkins enter a fine dining restaurant, appearing out-of-place in their cowboy hats and jeans. The other diners at first appear skeptic, but after Shelton and Adkins begin singing they become interested. Eventually, everyone in the restaurant is up and dancing, while Shelton and Adkins perform. The video was filmed at the Stockyard Restaurant in Nashville, Tennessee.

== Chart performance ==
=== Weekly charts ===
Weekly chart performance for "Hillbilly Bone"
Chart (2009–2010)	Peak position
Canada Country (Billboard)	8
Canada (Canadian Hot 100)	84
US Billboard Hot 100	40
US Hot Country Songs (Billboard)	1

=== Year-end charts ===
Year-end chart performance for "Hillbilly Bone"
Chart (2010)	Position
US Country Songs (Billboard)	31

== Certifications ==
Certifications for "Hillbilly Bone"
Region	Certification	Certified units/sales
United States (RIAA)	Platinum	1,000,000^{‡}
^{‡} Sales+streaming figures based on certification alone.
