= My Eyes (Blake Shelton song) =

Single by Blake Shelton featuring Gwen Sebastian

from the album Based on a True Story...
- Released: April 14, 2014
- Recorded: 2013
- Genre: Country
- Length: 3:10
- Label: Warner Bros. Nashville
- Songwriters: Tommy Lee James; Josh Osborne; Andrew Dorff
- Producer: Scott Hendricks

Blake Shelton singles chronology
| "Medicine" (2014) | "My Eyes" (2014) | "Neon Light" (2014) |

Gwen Sebastian singles chronology
| "Annie's New Gun" (2014) | "My Eyes" (2014) | "Small Town Soul" (2014) |

"My Eyes" is a song recorded by American country music artist Blake Shelton featuring Gwen Sebastian. It was released in April 2014 as the fifth single from his seventh studio album, Based on a True Story.... The song was written by Andrew Dorff, Tommy Lee James and Josh Osborne.

== Content ==
"My Eyes" was written by Andrew Dorff, Tommy Lee James, and Josh Osborne. The idea for the song originated with Osborne, who started the songwriting process by sharing his idea for the hook, "My eyes are the only thing I don’t want to take off of you." According to James, the rest of the song was then written "pretty fast". James said of the song, "Some of those lines in there remind me of Andrew and the quirky ways he would come up with stuff nobody else would come up with." He called it "actually a really, really, deceptively hard song to sing" and praised Shelton's recording as "really great".

Gwen Sebastian, who was mentored by Shelton on season two of The Voice and subsequently toured with him as a background singer, is featured on the track. She said of the opportunity to record with Shelton, "There's really no way I can repay him back, to be honest with you. Maybe try to pay him back in a bow and arrow, maybe some vodka."

She toured with me all last year and hopefully she’s going to again this year. When we cut 'My Eyes,' I could hear her singing it with me because there’s some ad lib stuff that only she could do. Gwen is doing all the harmonies, she just sounds so good on that record and I just love that girl. - Shelton about Gwen Sebastian.

== Critical reception ==
Billy Dukes of Taste of Country gave the song a positive review, saying that "‘My Eyes’ is a sexy love song that heats the sheets to a melting point hotter than his previous two lovers." Chuck Dauphin of Billboard praised "My Eyes", writing, "The melody knocks this one out of the ballpark. It’s cute, seductive, sly, and romantic all at once. And, former 'Voice' star Gwen Sebastian’s harmonies add a layer of dreaminess to this, as well."

== Commercial performance ==
"My Eyes" debuted at number 39 on the U.S. Billboard Country Airplay chart for the week of April 26, 2014. The song peaked at Number One on the Country Airplay Charts, making it Shelton's 12th consecutive number one single. It has sold 550,000 copies in the United States as of August 2014. The song was certified Gold by the RIAA on September 23, 2014.

== Charts ==
| Chart (2014) | Peak position |
|---|---|
| Canada Hot 100 (Billboard) | 39 |
| Canada Country (Billboard) | 1 |
| US Billboard Hot 100 | 39 |
| US Country Airplay (Billboard) | 1 |
| US Hot Country Songs (Billboard) | 4 |

=== Year-end charts ===
| Chart (2014) | Position |
|---|---|
| US Country Airplay (Billboard) | 53 |
| US Hot Country Songs (Billboard) | 39 |

== Certifications ==
| Region | Certification | Certified units/sales |
|---|---|---|
| Canada (Music Canada) | Gold | 40,000^{*} |
| United States (RIAA) | Platinum | 550,000 |
^{*} Sales figures based on certification alone.
