= Gwen Sebastian =

American country music singer-songwriter (born 1974)

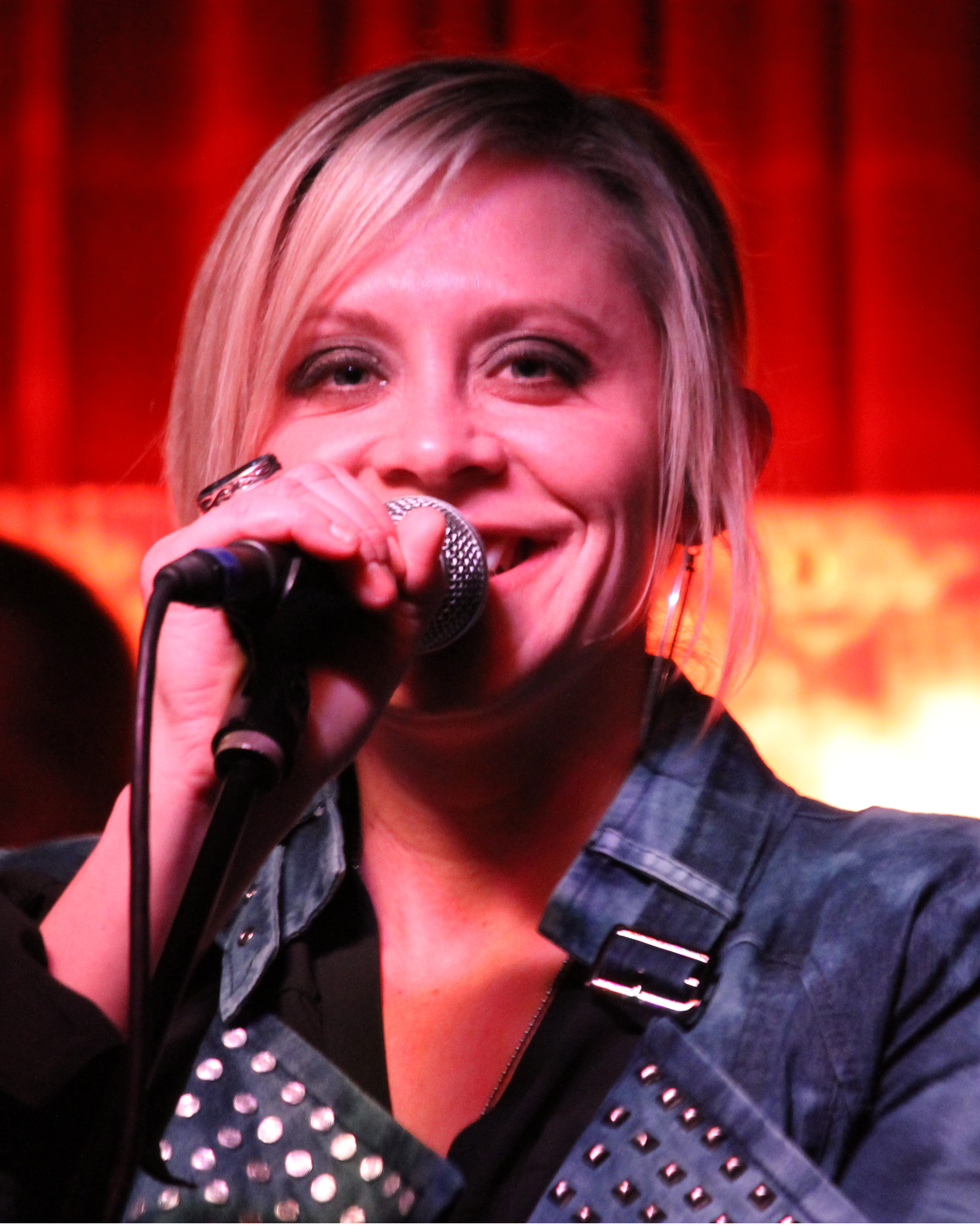
- Gwen Sebastian in 2013

Background information
- Born: Gwen Noel Sebastian; Hebron, North Dakota, US
- Origin: Nashville, Tennessee, US
- Genres: Country; rock
- Occupation: Singer-songwriter
- Instruments: Vocals; piano
- Years active: 2008–present
- Labels: Lofton Creek; Flying Island Entertainment
- Website: www.gwensebastian.com

Gwen Noel Sebastian is an American country music singer-songwriter. Sebastian was signed to Lofton Creek Records in 2009 and released two singles for the label. In 2012, she was a contestant on the second season of The Voice but lost in the battles.

== Biography ==
Gwen Sebastian was born in the small farming town of Hebron, North Dakota. After receiving her college degree, Sebastian attended nursing school, but dropped out after only one semester to relocate to Nashville, Tennessee and pursue her music career. She signed a recording deal with Lofton Creek Records in October 2009, and shortly thereafter Country Weekly named Sebastian among its pick of talented new artists to watch in 2010.

Sebastian's first single, "Hard Rain", was released to country radio on October 12, 2009. The song received a "thumbs up" from Engine 145 reviewer Sam Gazdziak, who described it as a "smartly written song [with] solid vocals."

In October 2009, Sebastian re-released a Christmas album titled Christmas in July on Lofton Creek/Open Road Records which featured some original Christmas music as well as covers of holiday standards. On May 25, 2010, she digitally released a 6-song EP titled V.I.P. The title track, "V.I.P. (Barefoot Girl)", was nationally released to country radio, along with a video.

Sebastian sang the National Anthem for the New York Yankees' Spring Training game against the Detroit Tigers in Tampa, Florida on March 28, 2010, and received a congratulatory hug from actor Richard Gere who was in attendance.

On June 8, 2010, Sebastian participated in the 4th Annual Country Weekly Fashion Show and Concert, held at the Wildhorse Saloon in Nashville. The event raised funds and awareness for Musicians on Call, a nonprofit organization with the mission of bringing music to the bedsides of patients in healthcare facilities.

Sebastian was a contestant on the second season of NBC's reality singing competition The Voice. Sebastian chose fellow country singer Blake Shelton to be her vocal coach for the show. Sebastian worked with Shelton and Miranda Lambert for her battle round, but was eliminated just before the live shows. After being eliminated, Sebastian toured with Shelton and Lambert. As of 2019, Sebastian is still part of Lambert's band, most recently accompanying her on the 2018 Livin' Like Hippies Tour and providing backing vocal on 2014's Platinum and 2016's The Weight of These Wings.

== The Voice ==
Round	Song	Original Artist	Current Coach	Competitor	Result
Blind Audition	"Stay"	Sugarland	Blake Shelton	—N/a	3 chairs turned
Battle Rounds	"We Belong"	Pat Benatar	Blake Shelton	Erin Willett	Eliminated

== Discography ==
=== Albums ===
Title	Details
Invitation	Release date: September 18, 2008; Label: Open Road
Push Play	Release date: July 9, 2009; Label: Open Road
Gwen Sebastian	Release date: June 25, 2013; Label: Flying Island
Once Upon A Time in the West: Act 1	Release date: November 17, 2017; Label: Flying Island
Once Upon A Time in the West: Act 2	Release date: April 24, 2020; Label: Flying Island

=== Holiday albums ===
Title	Details
Christmas in July	Release date: September 18, 2008; Label: Lofton Creek/Open Road

=== Extended plays ===
Title	Details
V.I.P. Barefoot Girl	Release date: May 25, 2010; Label: Lofton Creek/Open Road

=== Singles ===
Year	Single	Peak positions	Album
Year	Single	US Country	Album
2009	"Hard Rain"	—	V.I.P. Barefoot Girl
2010	"V.I.P. (Barefoot Girl)"	—	V.I.P. Barefoot Girl
2012	"Met Him in a Motel Room"	58	Gwen Sebastian
2013	"Suitcase"	—	Gwen Sebastian
2013	"The Fox"	—	—N/a
2014	"Annie's New Gun" (with Miranda Lambert)	—	Gwen Sebastian
2014	"Small Town Soul"	—	—N/a
2017	"Cadillac"	—	Once Upon a Time in the West: Act 1
"—" denotes releases that did not chart

=== Guest singles ===
Year	Single	Artist	Peak chart positions					Certifications	Album
Year	Single	Artist	US Country	US Country Airplay	US	CAN Country	CAN	Certifications	Album
2014	"My Eyes"	Blake Shelton	4	1	39	1	39	US: Gold	Based on a True Story...

=== Music videos ===
Year	Video	Director
2010	"V.I.P. (Barefoot Girl)"	Amanda Van Dandt
2013	"Suitcase"	Becky Fluke
2014	"Small Town Soul"	
