= Sure Be Cool If You Did =

Single by Blake Shelton

from the album Based on a True Story…
- B-side: "There's a New Kid in Town"
- Released: January 8, 2013
- Recorded: 2012
- Genre: Country pop
- Length: 3:35
- Label: Warner Bros. Nashville
- Songwriters: Rodney Clawson; Chris Tompkins; Jimmy Robbins
- Producer: Scott Hendricks

Blake Shelton singles chronology
"Just a Fool" (2012)	"Sure Be Cool If You Did" (2013)	"Boys 'Round Here" (2013)

"Sure Be Cool If You Did" is a song written by Rodney Clawson, Chris Tompkins, and Jimmy Robbins and recorded by American country music artist Blake Shelton. It was released on January 8, 2013, as the first single from Shelton's 2013 album Based on a True Story…. The song reached number one on both the US Billboard Country Airplay and Hot Country Songs charts.

== Content ==
Shelton described "Sure Be Cool If You Did" as having "a lot of the elements that you try and include on an album, all in one song", calling it "kind of manic" and "a little bit mischievous". He compared its production to that of songs by artists like Jason Aldean, Luke Bryan, and Carrie Underwood, which he considered indicative of where he wanted to be "going musically", and said, "It’s got a loop in it, and it’s got some snaps and some samples and different sounds like that that people I don’t think would have ever expected to hear from me."

Shelton compared the song to R&B, which he felt was "kind of a new sound for country music". Because of this, he said, that "a lot of time" was spent "working on that track".

The song was written by Rodney Clawson, Chris Tompkins, and Jimmy Robbins. Clawson performed the song's demo.

I had an e-mail from my manager Brandon Blackstock, and he said, 'Man, this is a cool song, you need to listen to it.' I did, and I was like, 'Holy Cow!' Rodney's a great singer and it was him singing on the demo and they just did a great job. My only fear was, 'I hope I can make my record as good as what they’ve done.' - Shelton.

== Critical reception ==
"Sure Be Cool If You Did" was praised by Entertainment Weekly, which gave it an A− and called it "ludicrously catchy". Billy Dukes of Taste of Country gave the song three stars out of five, calling it "comparatively ordinary next to catalog hits like 'She Wouldn't Be Gone' and the infectious 'Honey Bee'" and writing that "a break in the name of artistry would satisfy fans of his rowdier songs, while giving those who discovered him on TV something more nourishing to listen to." Matt Bjorke of Roughstock gave the song three and a half stars out of five, saying that "the production of Scott Hendricks may not be as groundbreaking or as 'identifying' as say Jay Joyce or Joey Moi's productions are but the sound here is still likable - albeit a tad MOR." Bob Paxman of Country Weekly gave the song a C and compared the song's melody to that of an earlier Shelton single, "Over". He felt that "Sure Be Cool If You Did" featured cliche lyrics but praised Shelton's vocal performance as "truly rich and expressive" while singling out "the searing guitar breaks" as "the most interesting components" of the song.

Gary Graff of The Oakland Press called the song "as polished and melodic as any pop hit". Chuck Dauphin of Billboard wrote, "it’s not exactly the most well-written song of his career, but his vocal is very pleasing on the cut – as well as the arrangement." Steve Legget of AllMusic gave "Sure Be Cool If You Did" three-and-a-half stars out of five and wrote that it has "an unassuming but memorable and melodic chorus hook" that highlights Shelton's "considerable strengths as an interpreter of country love ballads."

== Commercial performance ==
"Sure Be Cool If You Did" debuted at number 32 on the U.S. Billboard Country Airplay chart for the week of January 19, 2013. It was Shelton's second highest debut. In addition, the song entered in at number 44 on the Billboard Hot 100 for the week of January 26, 2013, and it sold over 98,000 downloads during its first week of release. The song also debuted at number 45 on Hot Country Songs for the week of January 19, 2013, and at number 43 on the Canadian Hot 100 chart for the week of January 26, 2013. On the country chart dated March 9, 2013, "Sure Be Cool If You Did" became Shelton's eighth consecutive number one hit, and his thirteenth overall. It reached number one faster than any of his previous singles. As of November 2013, the song has over sold 1,519,000 copies in the United States. It was certified double Platinum on May 8, 2015, by the RIAA for combined two million units of sales and streams.

== Music video ==
The accompanying music video for this song was directed by Trey Fanjoy and premiered in February 2013. It depicts Blake singing the song in a city bar at night, and a wild party going on at the same bar. It was filmed mainly on vintage film, resulting in a grainy texture.

== Charts ==
Chart (2013)	Peak position
Canada Hot 100 (Billboard)	32
Canada Country (Billboard)	1
US Billboard Hot 100	24
US Country Airplay (Billboard)	1
US Hot Country Songs (Billboard)	1

=== Year-end charts ===
Chart (2013)	Position
Canada Canadian Hot 100	95
US Billboard Hot 100	80
US Country Airplay (Billboard)	45
US Hot Country Songs (Billboard)	9

== Certifications ==
Region	Certification	Certified units/sales
Canada (Music Canada)	Platinum	80,000^{*}
United States (RIAA)	3× Platinum	1,519,000
^{*} Sales figures based on certification alone.
