= Hillbilly Bone =

EP by Blake Shelton
- Released: March 2, 2010
- Genre: Country
- Length: 23:39
- Label: Reprise Nashville
- Producer: Scott Hendricks

Blake Shelton chronology
Startin' Fires (2008)	Hillbilly Bone (2010)	All About Tonight (2010)

Singles from Hillbilly Bone
- 1. "Hillbilly Bone" Released: October 24, 2009

Professional ratings
Review scores
Source	Rating
Allmusic	3/5 stars
Billboard	4/5 stars
Country Weekly	3/5 stars
Entertainment Weekly	B
Slant Magazine	3/5 stars

Hillbilly Bone is the first extended play, and seventh studio release overall, by American country music singer/songwriter Blake Shelton. It was released on March 2, 2010 (see 2010 in country music) via Warner Music Group Nashville, his first album under its Reprise label. The only single released was the title track, a duet with Trace Adkins which was released to radio in November 2009. This song reached number one on the U.S. Billboard country singles charts in April 2010.

== Background ==
Hillbilly Bone was conceived as part of an experiment undertaken by Shelton to release multiple extended plays throughout the year. Marketed as "six-paks", these releases were offered as cheaper alternatives to full albums, in an effort to combat the music industry-wide trend of declining album sales that had begun occurring during the preceding years.

== Content ==
Hillbilly Bone's title track, which features a guest vocal from Trace Adkins, was released on October 24, 2009 as the lead-off single. One month prior to the EP's release, this song reached the country Top 10 and in March it became his sixth Number One. Shelton later reflected that "Hillbilly Bone" marked "the revival" of his career, saying, "I think I was existing up until that point. But that was me finally stepping out. Me finally being the guy to the public that everybody behind the scenes knew. And me going, 'You know what? I’m this guy. I’ve got to be this guy on my records and to the public.'"

The track "Kiss My Country Ass" was co-written and previously released by Rhett Akins on his 2007 album People Like Me. The track "Delilah" was named after a dog owned by Miranda Lambert, Shelton's then-girlfriend and now-ex-wife. Shelton's inspiration to write the song, which is about a woman who overlooks her friend as a potential partner, came while Shelton was pet sitting Delilah, who ignored Shelton and was anxious about not having Lambert nearby.

== Critical reception ==
Jessica Phillips of Country Weekly, Thom Jurek of Allmusic and Jonathan Keefe of Slant Magazine all gave the EP three stars out of five. Phillips wrote that it "finds Blake Shelton coming into his own when it comes to song selection." She also called "Delilah" the strongest-written track on it. Jurek called its material "formula contemporary country" and said that the label's decision to release multiple EPs instead of an album was "risky." Jonathan Keefe criticized the "compressed" production and the lyrics of "Hillbilly Bone" and "Kiss My Country Ass," but commended the recording for having a common theme among its songs.

== Commercial performance ==
The album debuted at number two on the U.S. Billboard Top Country Albums, and number three on the U.S. Billboard 200 chart, selling 71,000 copies in its first week of release.

== Track listing ==
No.	Title	Writer(s)	Length
1.	"Hillbilly Bone" (duet with Trace Adkins)	Luke Laird, Craig Wiseman	3:44
2.	"Kiss My Country Ass"	Rhett Akins, Dallas Davidson, Jon Stone	4:12
3.	"You'll Always Be Beautiful"	Lee Brice, Jerrod Niemann, Stone	3:47
4.	"Can't Afford to Love You"	Akins, Ben Hayslip, Jimmy Yeary	3:23
5.	"Delilah"	Blake Shelton	3:41
6.	"Almost Alright"	Clint Lagerberg, Wiseman	3:06

== Personnel ==
- Trace Adkins - duet vocals on "Hillbilly Bone"
- Tom Bukovac - electric guitar
- Perry Coleman - background vocals
- Eric Darken - percussion
- Connie Ellisor - violin
- Paul Franklin - pedal steel guitar
- Aubrey Haynie - fiddle
- Charlie Judge - synthesizer strings
- Betsy Lamb - viola
- Troy Lancaster - electric guitar
- Brent Mason - electric guitar
- Greg Morrow - drums, percussion
- Gordon Mote - Hammond B-3 organ, piano
- Carole Rabinowitz - cello
- Blake Shelton - lead vocals
- Pam Sixfin - violin
- Jimmie Lee Sloas - bass guitar
- Ron Sorbo - steel drums
- Bryan Sutton - banjo, acoustic guitar, mandolin
- Craig Wiseman - drum loop, electric guitar
- Jennifer Zuffinetti - background vocals

== Charts ==
Chart (2010)	Peak position
U.S. Billboard Top Country Albums	2
U.S. Billboard 200	3

=== End of year charts ===
Chart (2010)	Year-end 2010
US Billboard 200	155
US Billboard Top Country Albums	27

=== Singles ===
Year	Single	Peak chart positions		
Year	Single	US Country	US	CAN
2009	"Hillbilly Bone" (with Trace Adkins)	1	40	84
