= Neon Light (Blake Shelton song) =

Single by Blake Shelton

from the album Bringing Back the Sunshine
- Released: August 18, 2014
- Recorded: 2014
- Genre: Country
- Length: 3:41
- Label: Warner Bros. Nashville
- Songwriters: Andrew Dorff; Mark Irwin; Josh Kear
- Producer: Scott Hendricks

Blake Shelton singles chronology
"My Eyes" (2014)	"Neon Light" (2014)	"Lonely Tonight" (2014)

"Neon Light" is a song written by Andrew Dorff, Mark Irwin and Josh Kear and recorded by American country music artist Blake Shelton. It was released to country radio on August 18, 2014, as the lead single to his eighth studio album Bringing Back the Sunshine. The album was released on September 30, 2014.

== Content ==
The song is a mid-tempo with a "pulsing drum loop" and "banjo, acoustic guitar, and Telecaster piling on layer by layer". It is about a man who heads to a bar after a breakup and states that "there's a neon light at the end of the tunnel".

== Critical reception ==
Jon Freeman of Country Weekly gave the song a "B". He called the song "a move back toward center and the more traditional country fare that launched his career" but criticized the repetition of the lyrics on the verses.

== Commercial performance ==
The song was certified Gold by the RIAA on January 5, 2015. It has sold 526,000 copies in the US as of January 2015.

== Music video ==
The music video was directed by Cody Kern and premiered on 12 September 2014.

== Charts ==
Chart (2014–2015)	Peak position
Canada (Canadian Hot 100)	49
Canada Country (Billboard)	1
US Billboard Hot 100	43
US Country Airplay (Billboard)	1
US Hot Country Songs (Billboard)	3

=== Year-end charts ===
Chart (2014)	Position
US Country Airplay (Billboard)	43
US Hot Country Songs (Billboard)	43

Chart (2015)	Position
US Hot Country Songs (Billboard)	88

== Certifications ==
Region	Certification	Certified units/sales
Canada (Music Canada)	Gold	40,000^{*}
United States (RIAA)	Platinum	524,000
^{*} Sales figures based on certification alone.
