= Boys 'Round Here =

Single by Blake Shelton featuring Pistol Annies and friends

from the album Based on a True Story...
- Released: March 26, 2013
- Recorded: 2013
- Genre: Country music
- Length: 4:48 (album version); 3:48 (radio edit); 5:39 (dance mix)
- Label: Warner Bros. Nashville
- Songwriters: Rhett Akins; Dallas Davidson; Craig Wiseman
- Producer: Scott Hendricks

Blake Shelton singles chronology
"Sure Be Cool If You Did" (2013)	"Boys 'Round Here" (2013)	"Mine Would Be You" (2013)

Audio sample
- file; help

"Boys 'Round Here" is a song written by Rhett Akins, Dallas Davidson, and Craig Wiseman and recorded by American country music artist Blake Shelton. The song is credited to "Blake Shelton with Pistol Annies and Friends", as it features myriad vocal collaborators including the Pistol Annies (Miranda Lambert, Ashley Monroe, and Angaleena Presley), along with country singer RaeLynn, all three co-writers, and Scott Hendricks, who also produced the track.

The song uses examples of a Southern lifestyle to create its lyrical narrative. It was released in 2013 as the second single from Shelton's seventh studio album, Based on a True Story... "Boys 'Round Here" received polarized reviews for its production style and lyrical content. It peaked at number 1 on both the Country Airplay and Canada Country charts published by Billboard. It was the third-bestselling country song of 2013 in the US. It is certified five-times Platinum in the US, triple Platinum in Canada, and Gold in New Zealand.

== Content ==
"Boys 'Round Here" is a celebration of Southern life. It is in the key of A major with an approximate tempo of 84 beats per minute and a chord pattern of A-D. Its verses are largely spoken-word. Billboard described the song as having "a bit of a hip-hop feel".

The song features backing vocals from several people associated with Shelton: the Pistol Annies, a group featuring Shelton's then-wife, Miranda Lambert; RaeLynn, a contestant on The Voice, on which Shelton was a judge; co-writers Rhett Akins, Dallas Davidson and Craig Wiseman; and producer Scott Hendricks. Of the song's theme, Wiseman said that he felt it was an example of "write what you know" despite criticism of songs which use similar Southern themes.

The refrain of "red, red, red, red, red, red, redneck" heard in the opening of the song originated when Wiseman asked his co-writers about their weekend during a songwriting session and Davidson replied, "Man, I was down in Georgia, hanging out with rednecks." Wiseman had been recording the conversation and decided to "[chop] it up into short pieces". He explained, "I've been messing [around with] my cut and paste stuff, doing my hillbilly Skrillex thing. So I cut and pasted (the recording of 'rednecks') a couple of times. Finally, everybody was like, 'Anybody got any ideas?' . I was like, 'This?' I hit (the button), and it was like, 'Red, red, red, red, redneck.'"

I told Craig, “This sounds pretty cool. But you know, that red, red, redneck thing ain't gonna make (the final song)...we probably ought to take all that off." Craig did not take my advice at all. He turned the "red, red, redneck" up louder, and all the little adlibs that I thought wouldn't work. Craig sends us the demo that night. And I was like, "Sounds cool. But man. You think that 'redneck' and all that stuff is gonna work?" He goes, "Do I think it's gonna work? Blake's already texted me back and said he knows it's gonna work." - Rhett Akins.

Davidson wrote the song's opening lyrics after seeing a Beatles-themed clock in Wiseman's office. He said, "I remember thinking to myself, I'm from Albany, Georgia. I didn't really listen to The Beatles. No offense, The Beatles are one of the greatest bands of all time, but I didn't listen to The Beatles. So I remember I blurted out 'Well the boys 'round here don't listen to The Beatles/ Run Ol' Bocephus through a jukebox needle at a honky-tonk, where their boots stomp all night,' and then Craig goes, 'That's right,' kind of in celebration of getting the song started".

Shelton advocated for "Boys 'Round Here" to be released as the second single from Based on a True Story..., calling it, "the best way to put into a song my personality" and saying, "That song had me from the first, 'cause I thought about all the guys I know back in Tishamingo [sic]. None of them listened to The Beatles. They listened to Hank, or these days you'll hear Jason Aldean blaring out of somebody's car coming from a mile away. It's just how they are, and that song is just written exactly how I live."

== Recording ==
Pieces of the demo recorded by Akins, Davidson, and Wiseman were incorporated into the official cut of the song. The opening refrain of "red, red, red, red, red, red, redneck" is the original recording of Davidson from the songwriting session in Wiseman's office, while the guitar played during the opening of the song is a recording of Wiseman playing his own guitar during that same session. Hendricks explained, "even the best musicians in [Nashville] could not duplicate [the sound of Wiseman playing on the demo]...It's a $200 guitar that sounds like no other guitar on the planet. The guy who plays on our sessions has $80,000 guitars that sound incredible, but they don't sound like this $200 guitar. So we built this track ... around this acoustic guitar."

According to Wiseman, Shelton responded to the song almost immediately. Wiseman said, "Most of the time...even if they love you, I mean, you send (a demo) and it just goes into the ether forever. But man, every now and again, you send a three minute and 35 second song, and three minutes and 40 seconds later they text you back."

Shelton described his vocal performance on the spoken word segments of the song as "Jerry Reed-type rapping." He contrasted this with what he characterized as a more conventional style of rapping that had become popular in country music as a result of Jason Aldean.

== Versions ==
A radio edit of the song was released, substituting the word "shit" with "lip".

In June 2013, a Celebrity mix version premiered on BlakeShelton.com. It features Jason Aldean, Luke Bryan, Ronnie Dunn, Miranda Lambert, Reba McEntire, Brad Paisley, Josh Turner, Keith Urban and Hank Williams Jr., each of whom performs part of the "redneck" line. The Celebrity mix version was released to iTunes on June 11, 2013.

== Live performances ==
In January 2015, Shelton performed the song on Saturday Night Live.

== Critical reception ==
Billy Dukes of Taste of Country gave the song 4.5 stars out of 5, saying that it "is intentionally silly, but score the singer significant style points for never taking his story too seriously." Giving it 4 out of 5 stars, Matt Bjorke of RoughStock compared it favorably to Shelton's previous singles "Ol' Red" and "Playboys of the Southwestern World", saying that "Boys 'Round Here" "took chances" like those songs did. He also praised the instrumentation. Writing for Billboard, Chuck Dauphin called the song "a cool ode to Shelton’s ‘homies’ back home in Oklahoma". Melissa Maerz of Entertainment Weekly complimented the song as a "silly but fun blast-it-from-your-truck sing-along", while Jerry Shriver of USA Today praised the song's production and "hilarious rap" as "irresistible."

Less favorable reviews came from Joseph Hudak of Country Weekly and Sam Gazdziak of Country Universe. Hudak wrote that the song "revisits the lyrical red dirt roads we’ve traveled many times before", while Gazdziak wrote of the song, "Sexist, crude and jam-packed with country stereotypes, it’s an embarrassment to everyone involved". He considered it "one of the worst country songs of recent memory." Stephen Thomas Erlewine of AllMusic considered the rapped portions of the song to be "vaguely embarrassing". Mikael Wood of the Los Angeles Times dismissed the song as "basically a string of unconnected SEO keywords".

Matt Bjorke of Roughstock predicted that "Boys 'Round Here" would "polarize fans". He noted that some may consider it a rap song, but wrote "to my ears - at least - it is no different from the Classic Country talking songs." He felt that the song proves that Shelton "still takes chances here or there". Hendricks identified "Boys 'Round Here" as "probably" his and Shelton's "favorite song" from Based on a True Story...

== Music video ==
The music video was directed by Trey Fanjoy and premiered in May 2013.

== Commercial performance ==
"Boys 'Round Here" débuted at number 44 on the U.S. Billboard Hot Country Songs chart for the week of April 6, 2013. It peaked at number two, but was kept out of the top spot by "Cruise by Florida Georgia Line". It also debuted at number 19 on the U.S. Billboard Country Airplay chart for the week of April 13, 2013, at number 67 on the U.S. Billboard Hot 100 chart for the week of April 13, 2013 and at number 60 on the Canadian Hot 100 chart for the week of April 20, 2013. It has sold over a million copies in the United States as of June 2013. It reached Number One on the Country Airplay chart dated June 29, 2013, becoming Shelton's ninth consecutive Number One country single, and his fourteenth overall. The song was certified 3× Platinum by the Recording Industry Association of America on May 8, 2015. As of June 2014, the song has sold 2,559,000 copies in the U.S. The song peaked at number 12 at the Billboard Hot 100, becoming his highest peaking song to date.

== Charts ==
=== Weekly charts ===
Chart (2013)	Peak position
Canada Hot 100 (Billboard)	12
Canada Country (Billboard)	1
US Billboard Hot 100	12
US Country Airplay (Billboard)	1
US Hot Country Songs (Billboard)	2

=== Year-end charts ===
Chart (2013)	Position
Canada Canadian Hot 100	66
US Billboard Hot 100	60
US Country Airplay (Billboard)	41
US Hot Country Songs (Billboard)	3

== Certifications ==
Region	Certification	Certified units/sales
Canada (Music Canada)	3× Platinum	240,000^{*}
New Zealand (RMNZ)	Gold	15,000^{‡}
United States (RIAA)	5× Platinum	2,559,000
^{*} Sales figures based on certification alone.^{‡} Sales+streaming figures based on certification alone.
