= Doin' What She Likes =

Single by Blake Shelton

from the album Based on a True Story...
- Released: January 6, 2014
- Recorded: 2013
- Genre: Country
- Length: 3:42
- Label: Warner Bros. Nashville
- Songwriters: Wade Kirby; Phil O'Donnell
- Producer: Scott Hendricks

Blake Shelton singles chronology
"Mine Would Be You" (2013)	"Doin' What She Likes" (2014)	"Medicine" (2014)

"Doin' What She Likes" is a song recorded by American country music artist Blake Shelton. It was released in January 2014 as the fourth single from his seventh studio album, Based on a True Story.... The song was written by Wade Kirby and Phil O'Donnell.

== Content ==
"Doin' What She Likes" was written by Phil O'Donnell and Wade Kirby. At the time of the song's release, Shelton said that he associated the song with his then-marriage to Miranda Lambert.

Lyrically, this is about Miranda and it’s also about how I should be more like this guy probably. But every now and then there’s a day where it’s like, 'You know what, we’re not doing anything tomorrow, so I’m just going to do whatever you want to do tomorrow. I’m gonna be your sidekick,' you know, and she loves that. - Shelton.

== Critical reception ==
Mikael Wood of the Los Angeles Times considered "Doin' What She Likes" to be a highlight from Based on a True Story..., writing that the album's "best tunes are the ones in which you can hear Shelton cracking himself up". Billy Dukes of Taste of Country gave the song a favorable review, writing that "this song isn’t as vocally impressive as some of Shelton’s best ballads, but not every song needs to be 'She Wouldn't Be Gone.' There’s a warmth to the production that complements his genuine intentions." Dukes felt that "some will say the synthesized guitars go a little too far, but most will argue he pushes this moment just far enough." Chuck Dauphin of Billboard complimented the arrangement of "Doin' What She Likes" and called the song "one of Shelton’s most musically adventurous yet", feeling that the song "manages to touch a few different genres all at one time."

Melissa Maerz of Entertainment Weekly was less favorable towards the song, finding Shelton's attempts at romance on Based on a True Story... underwhelming and writing, "his cheeseball act can make you cringe".

== Commercial performance ==
"Doin' What She Likes" debuted at number 47 on the U.S. Billboard Country Airplay chart for the week of January 4, 2014. It also debuted at number 47 on the U.S. Billboard Hot Country Songs chart for the week of April 13, 2013. It also debuted at number 84 on the U.S. Billboard Hot 100 chart for the week of February 1, 2014. It also debuted at number 77 on the Canadian Hot 100 chart for the week of February 1, 2014. The song is also Shelton's eleventh consecutive number 1 song, breaking the record previously set by Brad Paisley between 2005 and 2009 for the most consecutive number 1 singles on the country charts since they were first tracked by Nielsen Broadcast Data Systems in January 1990. The song has sold 533,000 copies in the U.S. as of May 2014. It was certified Platinum by the RIAA on October 7, 2016, for a million units in sales and streams.

== Music video ==
The music video was directed by Mason Dixon and premiered on February 14, 2014. It starts with a phone conversation between Blake and his then-wife Miranda Lambert. Blake asks Miranda about dinner plans, and he suggests he cook something for her, to which she responds "That sounds romantic!" The song then starts, and footage of Blake singing in a smoky pavement is interspersed with Blake at his house trying to make a nice evening for Miranda. Things only go from bad to worse, however, starting with his margaritas turning out slushy, then his uneasy handling of bread batter, and finally his lighting of candles, which when he leaves a trail of rose petals on the floor and stairs leading the way to the bathroom, flame up and burn the whole house. Firemen (wcfire.com) are then shown trying to fight the huge house fire to no avail, while Blake sings the finale of the song in front of the burning house. The video ends with Miranda calling Blake back, and he says he now insists they go out to dinner and he pick her up instead of them staying home.

Like his video for 2011's "God Gave Me You", (which also has an important Miranda scene), CMT took this video out of rotation after Blake & Miranda's 2015 divorce.

== Charts ==
Chart (2014)	Peak position
Canada Hot 100 (Billboard)	35
Canada Country (Billboard)	1
US Billboard Hot 100	35
US Country Airplay (Billboard)	1
US Hot Country Songs (Billboard)	3

=== Year-end charts ===
Chart (2014)	Position
US Country Airplay (Billboard)	38
US Hot Country Songs (Billboard)	33

== Certifications ==
Region	Certification	Certified units/sales
Canada (Music Canada)	Gold	40,000^{*}
United States (RIAA)	Platinum	1,000,000^{‡}
^{*} Sales figures based on certification alone.^{‡} Sales+streaming figures based on certification alone.
