= Mine Would Be You =

Single by Blake Shelton

from the album Based on a True Story…
- Released: July 22, 2013
- Recorded: 2013
- Genre: Country
- Length: 3:59
- Label: Warner Bros. Nashville
- Songwriters: Jessi Alexander; Connie Harrington; Deric Ruttan
- Producer: Scott Hendricks

Blake Shelton singles chronology
"Boys 'Round Here" (2013)	"Mine Would Be You" (2013)	"Doin' What She Likes" (2014)

"Mine Would Be You" is a song written by Jessi Alexander, Connie Harrington, and Deric Ruttan and recorded by American country music artist Blake Shelton. It was released in July 2013 as the third single from Shelton's 2013 album Based on a True Story…. The song reached number one the US Billboard Country Airplay chart.

== Content ==
"Mine Would Be You" is a mid-tempo ballad in which the male asks his lover about her thoughts, with the final verse revealing that she is actually departing him. The song is set in the key of C major with a vocal range from G_{3} to E_{5}. The verses are in alternating measures of 3/4 and 4/4 time signatures.

== Writing ==
"Mine Would Be You" was written by Jessi Alexander, Connie Harrington, and Deric Ruttan. Although the three were friends and Harrington had written with both Alexander and Ruttan before, this was the first instance of Alexander and Ruttan writing together.

Alexander and Harrington had previously written "I Drive Your Truck" together with Jimmy Yeary, which was then recorded by Lee Brice. Remarking on how that experience shaped her and Harrington's approach to writing subsequent songs like "Mine Would Be You", Alexander said, "It was so exciting that Connie and I had written all these years, and couldn't get arrested, and with 'I Drive Your Truck' it was like we found the secret. 'Oh, we need a guy in the room.' It was exhilarating."

Harrington suggested the song title; after her suggestion, the group continued considering other concepts but kept returning to Harrington's idea. Ruttan said of the title, "Something set our songwriter spidey-sense off."

Alexander called the songwriting process "a blast", explaining that she and her co-writers "plowed through" various lyrical ideas until "It got deeper and deeper, pretty much as a positive love song in a gritty way".

The initial songwriting session was interrupted when Alexander had to pick up her children. The group finished writing the song a few nights later at Alexander's house, while Ruttan's wife and Alexander's husband, Jon Randall, cooked pizza for them. Ruttan described the scene, saying, "I’ll never forget...we’re tweaking on lines and the door opens and Jon Randall comes in with baked pita chips and he’s serving. I said, “thanks, Jon. Thanks, pal.” You know he wrote “Whiskey Lullaby,” but thanks for serving us chips."

The ending of the song was written during that second songwriting session. Alexander said, "And that is when the song took the twist to that negative last verse. I think having that perspective, getting away from the song, then coming back that evening, and having some wine, we started to go there. And it felt so right, to kind of complete the story."

The song was originally written to feature the line, "What’s your all-time high, your good as it gets? Your hands down best ever make-up kiss?" After recording the demo, Alexander suggested re-recording it to use the line "make-up sex" instead. She said, "I got this funny smirk on my face...it was late, we'd been drinking, the food was ready. But I said 'guys, I hate that we might have to do this again, but what about 'make up sex'?" Alexander insisted to her co-writers that Shelton would react well to the altered lyric, which was used in the final song.

Alexander] had borrowed a little high-string guitar...she kind of played just some random chords, and I was like, “Man, that’s cool.” And I pick my guitar up and I play what’s the verse progression in “Mine Would Be You.” And so just organically it kind of started to come together ... When it serves the song, I’m a big advocate of getting to the hook as quick as you can. And so that’s what kind of drove the short verses in that song and sticking the title on the end

— Deric Ruttan

== Critical reception ==
While reviewing Based on a True Story... for Taste of Country, Billy Dukes lauded "Mine Would Be You" as the album's "signature song." He described the last verse as "absolutely devastating" and called the track "a potential Song of the Year nominee". After the song was announced as a single, Dukes gave it five stars out of five, writing that "Shelton’s performance is as easy and satisfying as ‘Honey Bee,’ but during each chorus he opens up full-throttle to send a desperate message to the woman he’s longing for." Joseph Hudak of Country Weekly gave the song an A and wrote that it displays "exactly what makes Blake one of country’s smoothest crooners." Chuck Dauphin of Billboard called it "another strong romantic performance from Shelton", and later writing for Roughstock, called it "the best song on the album." In an otherwise negative review of Based on a True Story..., Sam Gazdziak of Country Universe singled out "Mine Would Be You" as one of the few songs from the album that he enjoyed, writing that on the song, Shelton "demonstrates that he is still an outstanding country singer when he wants to be."

Shelton himself described "Mine Would Be You" as "one of the best songs" he ever recorded and said, "It's just one of those songs that somebody plays at the Bluebird and the room stops and everybody has chills."

== Commercial performance ==
"Mine Would Be You" debuted at number 37 on the U.S. Billboard Hot Country Songs chart for the week of April 13, 2013. It also appeared at number 42 on the Country Airplay chart for the week of August 3, 2013. It also debuted at number 100 on the U.S. Billboard Hot 100 chart for the week of August 17, 2013. For the week of November 4, 2013 it became Shelton's 10th consecutive number one hit on the Country Airplay chart, tying Brad Paisley for the longest consecutive streak of chart-topping singles. As of January 2014, the songs has sold 823,000 copies in the United States. It was certified Platinum by the RIAA for a million units in sales and streams.

It also debuted at number 79 on the Canadian Hot 100 chart for the week of August 24, 2013.

== Versions ==
After Shelton recorded "Mine Would Be You", one of the songwriters, Jessi Alexander, recorded a version of the song for the 2019 EP Songs & Symphony.

== Charts ==
Chart (2013–2014)	Peak position
Canada Hot 100 (Billboard)	35
Canada Country (Billboard)	1
US Billboard Hot 100	28
US Country Airplay (Billboard)	1
US Hot Country Songs (Billboard)	2

=== Year-end charts ===
Chart (2013)	Position
US Country Airplay (Billboard)	19
US Hot Country Songs (Billboard)	35

Chart (2014)	Position
US Hot Country Songs (Billboard)	89

== Certifications ==
Region	Certification	Certified units/sales
Canada (Music Canada)	Platinum	80,000^{*}
United States (RIAA)	2× Platinum	2,000,000^{‡}
^{*} Sales figures based on certification alone.^{‡} Sales+streaming figures based on certification alone.
