= Me and You and the World =

Studio album by Dave Barnes
- Released: April 1, 2008
- Recorded: 2008
- Genre: Alternative rock; Indie rock; CCM; Singer-songwriter; Blues; R&B; Funk
- Length: 44:49
- Label: Razor & Tie
- Producer: Ed Cash; Dave Barnes

Dave Barnes chronology
Chasing Mississippi (2006)	Me and You and the World (2008)	You, the Night, and Candlelight (2009)

Me and You and the World is the third studio album, and first major label release, by American acoustic rock performer Dave Barnes. The album was launched internationally on April 1, 2008. The album's first single "Until You", which is a re-recording of a song from his first independent album, was released on February 19, 2008.

== Background ==
Following the release of his second independently recorded and launched album Chasing Mississippi, Dave Barnes began writing material for his next album while touring. During this tour, Barnes co-headlined a tour across the central states of the United States with best friend Matt Wertz. While on tour, Barnes was approached by Razor and Tie, a commercial recording label. Having studied Recording Industry Management in university, Barnes had developed the opinion that he should not engage in contracts with recording labels, however decided that in order to expand his musical audience, he would need to do so and signed an agreement with Razor and Tie, with whom he recorded the newly written album Me and You and the World.

== Songs and singles ==
As this album is his first commercial release, two songs have been included from his previous independent efforts, "On a Night Like This" and "Until You", which both originated from his first album Brother, Bring the Sun. Originally upon the announcement of the track listing, the song "Someday" was speculated as being a re-recording and minor renaming of "Someday, Sarah" from his second album Chasing Mississippi, however it was actually a separate song altogether. The final track from the album is named "Annie", which is Barnes' wife's given name.

The first single from the album is the remixed version of the song "Until You". The song's arrangement is nearly identical to the original, however is marginally slower, includes various additional guitar fills in the background, and additional backing vocals are evident toward the end of the song.

The album features guest musicians Brooke Fraser of New Zealand on the God-centric song "Believe", Gabe Dixon on piano on "Annie", and with his band on "Someday", and "When a Heart Breaks" features Barnes' friend Matt Wertz on backing vocals. The country-rock song "Good World Gone Bad" features Barnes' producer Ed Cash as both co-writer along with Barnes, and also on electric guitars, including contributing the guitar solo. .

== Release ==
The album was released on April 1, 2008, internationally, however the album was made available for pre-order beforehand. Any pre-orders registered received a free DVD and an additional CD to "give to the world", as Barnes noted in his blog. The DVD chronicles the making of the album.

== Track listing ==
All tracks are written by Dave Barnes, except where noted.

No.	Title	Writer(s)	Length
1.	"Brothers & Sisters"		3:34
2.	"Since You Said I Do"		3:55
3.	"Until You" (New Version)		4:27
4.	"When a Heart Breaks" (featuring Matt Wertz)	Dave Barnes; Ed Cash	5:02
5.	"Good World Gone Bad"	Dave Barnes; Ed Cash	3:16
6.	"On a Night Like This"		3:06
7.	"Carry Me Through"		3:16
8.	"Believe" (featuring Brooke Fraser)		3:18
9.	"Someday" (featuring The Gabe Dixon Band)	Dave Barnes; Gabe Dixon	4:39
10.	"10,000 Children"		2:47
11.	"Nothing Else"		4:22
12.	"Annie"	Dave Barnes; Gabe Dixon	2:57
Total length:			44:49

== Personnel ==
- Dave Barnes – vocals, rhythm guitars (1), intro lick (1), lead guitar (2), acoustic guitar (3–5, 8, 10, 11), guitar solo (5), electric guitar (9), electric guitar solo (11), general noodling (11)
- Ben Shive – keyboards (1–8, 11)
- Gabe Dixon – keyboards (9), backing vocals (9), acoustic piano (12)
- Jerry McPherson – lead guitars (1), electric guitars (4, 8)
- Ed Cash – backing vocals (1–3, 5, 6, 8, 9, 11, 12), rhythm guitar (2), electric guitars (3, 5, 6), percussion (7), acoustic bass (10)
- Justin Rosolino – rhythm guitar (2), electric guitar (6)
- Akil Thompson – electric guitar (5, 11)
- Matt Mangano – bass (1, 4, 8)
- Calvin Turner – bass (2, 5–7, 11)
- Matt Pierson – bass (3)
- Winston Harrison – bass (9)
- Josh Robinson – drums (1, 4, 8), snare drum (10)
- Dan Needham – drums (2, 3, 5–7, 11)
- Jano Rix – drums (9)
- Ken Lewis – percussion (1, 7, 10)
- John Catchings – cello (6, 12)
- David Davidson – strings (8, 11, 12)
- Jeff Coffin – saxophone (9, 11)
- Barry Green – trombone (9, 11)
- Steve Patrick – trumpet (9, 11)
- Leanne Palmore – backing vocals (1, 5)
- Christi Richardson – backing vocals (1, 5)
- Jovaun Woods – backing vocals (1, 5)
- Matt Wertz – backing vocals (4)
- Jason Eskridge – backing vocals (7)
- Joey Ritchie – backing vocals (7)
- Shannon Sanders – backing vocals (7)
- Brooke Fraser – backing vocals (8)

=== Production ===
- Beka Tischker – A&R
- Dave Barnes – producer
- Ed Cash – producer, engineer, mixing (1, 2, 5–12)
- Mark Endert – mixing (3, 4)
- Stephen Marcussen – mastering at Marcussen Mastering (Hollywood, California)
- Matt Lehman – design
- Leann Mueller – photography
- Chris DeTray – management
- Dryven Artist Management – management
