= Stop & Listen =

Studio album by Bethany Dillon
- Released: September 8, 2009
- Recorded: March – April 2009
- Studio: The Galt Line (Hollywood, California)
- Genre: Christian, CCM
- Length: 45:39
- Producer: Marshall Altman

Bethany Dillon chronology
In Christ Alone: Modern Hymns of Worship (2008)	Stop & Listen (2009)	A Better Word (2017)

Stop & Listen is the fourth studio solo album by Bethany Dillon, and was released in 2009. It reached No. 29 in the US Christian Album Charts the song "Everyone to Know" reached No. 44 in the US Charts.

== Critical reception ==
Stop & Listen received the following reviews:

AllMusic gave the album a three and a half star rating and was an AMG music pick. It said that the album was another noteworthy effort by the acoustic pop artist. Allmusic also proclaimed her as a master of her folk-pop sound and utilizes it well to convey powerful faith-based messages on this record. It also chose the songs "Everyone To Know", "Stop & Listen", and "Reach Out" as the track picks off of the album.

Jesusfreakhideout gave the album a three and a half star rating, calling the album a careful, heartfelt collection of sweet melodies and worshipful lyrics that chronicle her spiritual growth.

== Track listing ==
All songs written by Bethany Dillon, except where noted.

1. "Get Up and Walk" – 5:24
2. "Everyone to Know" (Dillon, Ed Cash) – 3:05
3. "I Am Yours" (Dillon, Cash) – 4:16
4. "Stop and Listen" (Dillon, Ben Glover, Joy Williams) – 4:21
5. "Say Your Name" – 4:14
6. "So Close" – 4:20
7. "Reach Out" – 4:05
8. "Deliver Me" – 5:09
9. "The Way I come to You" – 4:20
10. "In the Beginning" – 3:26
11. "Everyone to Know" (acoustic); featuring Shane Barnard – 3:04

== Personnel ==
- Bethany Dillon – vocals, acoustic guitar
- Marshall Altman – keyboards, programming, backing vocals
- Zac Rae – keyboards, acoustic piano, Wurlitzer electric piano, sounds
- Eric Robertson – keyboards, acoustic piano (11), acoustic guitar (11)
- Michael Chaves – electric guitars
- Filip "iZler" Eisler – electric guitars, guitarViol
- Brandon Walters – acoustic guitar (2, 4), electric guitars (2, 4)
- Sean Hurley – bass (1)
- Jonathan Ahrens – bass (2–10)
- Aaron Sterling – drums, percussion
- Laura Jansen – backing vocals
- Shane Barnard – vocals (11)

=== Production ===
- Brad O'Donnell – A&R
- Marshall Altman – producer, arrangements, recording
- Eric Robertson – recording, mixing (1, 3, 5–11)
- Joe Zook – mixing (2, 4)
- Dan Piscina – recording assistant
- Greg Calbi – mastering at Sterling Sound (New York, NY)
- Jess Chambers – A&R administration
- Jan Cook – art direction
- Andy Morris Design – design
- Tec Petaja – photography
- Aaron Adelsberger – management
