= Little Lies (disambiguation) =

"Little Lies" is a 1987 song by Fleetwood Mac.

Little Lies may also refer to:

- "Little Lies" (Dave Barnes song)
- "Little Lies" (Alexandra Stan song)
- "Little Lies" (Doctors), a 2005 television episode
