= Everything in Between =

Everything in Between may refer to:

- Everything in Between (Matt Wertz album)
- Everything in Between (No Age album)
- Everything in Between (Freddy Mullins album), by Freddy Mullins
- Everything in Between (2022 film)
