= Stories to Tell (Dave Barnes album) =

Studio album by Dave Barnes
- Released: March 13, 2012
- Genre: Rock; pop; country; blues; soul; R&B
- Length: 45:05
- Label: Razor & Tie
- Producer: John Fields, Dave Barnes

Dave Barnes chronology
What We Want, What We Get (2010)	Stories to Tell (2012)	Golden Days (2014)

Singles from Stories to Tell
- 1. "White Flag" Released: 2012; 2. "Love Will Be Enough For Us" Released: 2012

Professional ratings
Review scores
Source	Rating
AllMusic	3.5/5 stars
Jesus Freak Hideout	4/5 stars

Stories to Tell is the fifth studio album released by singer-songwriter Dave Barnes. A lot like his older albums, Stories To Tell has a mix of pop, country, rock, and soul. The album was recorded in Los Angeles and was the first time Barnes has recorded an album outside of his hometown of Nashville. The producer of the album was John Fields. Fields has produced with other bands including Lifehouse, Switchfoot, Goo Goo Dolls, and Pink. This was his fourth release on Razor & Tie record label, his previous release, What We Want, What We Get, was a success.

== Reception ==
Within a week of the album being released, it was already #11 on the iTunes top Singer/Songwriter page. On March 31, 2012, the album was #59 on the Billboard 200 chart.

== Track listing ==
All tracks are written by Dave Barnes, except where noted.

No.	Title	Writer(s)	Length
1.	"White Flag"		3:24
2.	"How Long"		3:05
3.	"Mine To Love"		3:48
4.	"Heaven Help Me"	Dave Barnes; Gabe Dixon	2:59
5.	"Love Will Be Enough For Us"	Dave Barnes; Brandon Heath; Joe Moralez	3:48
6.	"Seventeen"		3:44
7.	"Missing You"		3:25
8.	"Find Your Way Home"		3:03
9.	"Stories To Tell"		3:30
10.	"Warm Heart In a Cold World"		4:12
11.	"One of Us"		3:48
12.	"Baby Needs New Shoes" (iTunes exclusive)		3:21
13.	"White Flag (Radio Edit)" (iTunes exclusive)		3:22
Total length:			45:05
