= Imagination (Bethany Dillon album) =

Studio album by Bethany Dillon
- Released: August 16, 2005
- Recorded: 2004–2005
- Studio: Ed's (Franklin, Tennessee)
- Genre: CCM
- Length: 50:00
- Label: Sparrow
- Producer: Ed Cash

Bethany Dillon chronology
Bethany Dillon (2004)	Imagination (2005)	Waking Up (2007)

Professional ratings
Review scores
Source	Rating
Jesus Freak Hideout	link

Imagination is the second studio album released by Bethany Dillon. It was released on August 16, 2005.

== Critical reception ==
Timothy Yap of Hallels writes, "Imagination is the then 16 year-old's sophomore album that takes a step closer to CCM than her self-titled debut. Imagination is an optimistic, thoughtful album, full of interesting melodies and interwoven with string arrangements and heartfelt lyrics. This album is half energetic worship service, half quiet solitary confession."

Crosswalk touches on the album during an interview with Dillon and remarks, "Based on the artistic growth evident on Imagination, it's clear Bethany's commitment to being open is paying off. Simply put, this second album is a sophomore jump."

== Track listing ==
All tracks are written by Bethany Dillon and Ed Cash, unless otherwise noted.

No.	Title	Writer(s)	Length
1.	"Dreamer"		3:43
2.	"Hallelujah"		4:01
3.	"All That I Can Do"	Bethany Dillon; Ed Cash; Dave Barnes	3:36
4.	"Airplane"		4:18
5.	"I Believe In You"		4:06
6.	"My Love Hasn't Grown Cold"	Bethany Dillon	6:21
7.	"New"		3:53
8.	"The Way I See You"	Bethany Dillon	4:34
9.	"Vagabond"		4:15
10.	"Be Near Me"	Bethany Dillon	4:41
11.	"Imagination"	Bethany Dillon	6:32
Total length:			50:00

- Track information and credits verified from the album's liner notes.

== Personnel ==
- Bethany Dillon – vocals, acoustic guitar (1–5, 7–11), backing vocals (3, 5, 9, 10), electric guitars (6)
- Ian Fitchuk – keyboards (1–5)
- Gabe Scott – accordion (4), dobro (4), lap steel guitar (10)
- Jeff Roach – keyboards (6–10)
- Ed Cash – electric guitars (1, 3, 6–10), mandolin (1, 5, 9), Wurlitzer electric piano (2), backing vocals (2, 4, 7, 10), bass (11)
- Adam Lester – electric guitars (2)
- Craig Young – bass (1–5, 7–10), baritone guitar (6)
- Josh Robinson – drums (1–5, 10), percussion (2, 4, 10)
- Dan Needham – drums (6–10), percussion (10)
- John Catchings – cello (11)
- Matt Wertz – backing vocals (8)

Production

- Brad O'Donnell – executive producer
- Ed Cash – producer, recording, mixing
- Bob Ludwig – mastering at Gateway Mastering (Portland, Maine)
- Jan Cook – creative director
- Alexis Goodman – art direction, package design, illustration
- Robert Deutschman – photography
- Megan Thompson – hair, make-up
- Shannan Shepherd – wardrobe stylist
- Proper Management – management
