= Chasing Mississippi =

Studio album by Dave Barnes
- Released: March 21, 2006
- Recorded: 2006
- Studio: Ed's (Franklin, Tennessee)
- Genre: Alternative rock; Indie rock; CCM; Singer-songwriter; Blues; R&B; Funk
- Length: 40:19
- Label: No Gang Music
- Producer: Ed Cash; Dave Barnes

Dave Barnes chronology
Brother, Bring the Sun (2004)	Chasing Mississippi (2006)	Me and You and the World (2008)

Chasing Mississippi is the second studio album released by singer-songwriter Dave Barnes. Unlike Barnes' first album, Brother, Bring The Sun, Barnes co-produced the album along with Ed Cash. Due to the success of the first album and its high calibre, Christian music veteran Amy Grant and husband, country music veteran Vince Gill both offered their talents towards the creation of this album. Barnes accepted and both appear on the album in separate songs.

== Track listing ==
All tracks are written by Dave Barnes, except where noted.

No.	Title	Writer(s)	Length
1.	"A Lot Like Me"		4:49
2.	"Everybody but You"		3:39
3.	"Butterflies"		3:26
4.	"Someday, Sarah"	Dave Barnes; Ed Cash	3:39
5.	"Jackson" (featuring Vince Gill)		3:07
6.	"Miles to Go"	Dave Barnes; Ed Cash	4:23
7.	"All That Noise"		2:58
8.	"More Than a Man"		3:34
9.	"Greyhound"		2:13
10.	"Stay Away"		4:19
11.	"I Have and I Always Will" (featuring Amy Grant)		4:05
Total length:			40:19

== Personnel ==
Performance

- Dave Barnes – vocals, acoustic guitar (1–3, 7, 10, 11), electric guitar (8), guitar solo (8), tambourine (9), handclaps (9), noises (9)
- Ben Shive – keyboards (1–8, 10)
- Ed Cash – backing vocals (1–4, 6–8, 10), classical guitar (2), percussion (2), keyboards (4), acoustic guitar (4), electric guitar (6, 8), rhythm guitar (6), harmonica (9), bass drum (9), noises (9)
- Justin Rosolino – electric guitar (1–5, 7, 10), rhythm guitar (5, 6), lead guitar (6)
- Vince Gill – lead guitar (5), electric guitar (5), harmony vocals (5)
- Calvin Turner – bass (1–8, 10)
- Jackie Street – bass (4)
- Byron House – upright bass (9)
- Dan Needham – drums (1–8, 10)
- Scott Williamson – drums (4)
- Juselamal "Jackpot" Jenkins – trumpet (7)
- Matt Slocum – strings (11)
- Josh Hoge – backing vocals (1)
- Matt Wertz – backing vocals (8)
- Micah Kandros – harmony vocals (9)
- Amy Grant – harmony vocals (11)

Production

- Dave Barnes – producer
- Ed Cash – producer, engineer, mixing
- Bob Ludwig – mastering at Gateway Mastering (Portland, Maine)
- Matt Lehman – design
- Jeremy Cowart – photography
- Dryve Artist Management – management
