= Music Inspired by The Chronicles of Narnia: The Lion, the Witch and the Wardrobe =

Music Inspired by The Chronicles of Narnia: The Lion, the Witch, and the Wardrobe

Soundtrack album by Various artists
- Released: September 27, 2005
- Recorded: 2005
- Genre: Soundtrack
- Length: 42:09
- Label: Sparrow
- Producers: Peter York; Brad O'Donnel

The Chronicles of Narnia music chronology
Music Inspired by The Chronicles of Narnia: The Lion, the Witch, and the Wardrobe (2005)	The Lion, the Witch and the Wardrobe (2005)

Music Inspired by The Chronicles of Narnia: The Lion, the Witch, and the Wardrobe is an album consisting of songs by various Christian artists with the common theme of the book series The Chronicles of Narnia by C. S. Lewis. The album was released in anticipation of the December 9, 2005 premiere of the film The Chronicles of Narnia: The Lion, the Witch and the Wardrobe. By October 2005, the songs "Remembering You" by Steven Curtis Chapman and "Waiting for the World to Fall" by Jars of Clay were already being played on Contemporary Christian radio.

Relient K, Mae, and the Newsboys wrote songs ("In Like a Lion (Always Winter)" for Relient K, "Where the Falls Begin" for Mae, and "Something to Believe In" for the Newsboys) to be considered for inclusion on the album. When they were not asked to be on the album, the bands released the songs on their Apathetic EP, The Everglow Special Edition, and Go: Special Edition, respectively. Relient K also re-released their Narnia song on their Christmas album, Let It Snow, Baby... Let It Reindeer.

== Track listing ==
No.	Title	Writer(s)	Artist	Length
1.	"Waiting for the World to Fall"	Charlie Lowell, Dan Haseltine, Matt Odmark, Stephen Mason	Jars of Clay	3:40
2.	"Remembering You"	Caleb Chapman, Steven Curtis Chapman	Steven Curtis Chapman	3:52
3.	"Open Up Your Eyes"	Jeremy Camp	Jeremy Camp	3:39
4.	"Hero"	Bethany Dillon	Bethany Dillon	3:59
5.	"Stronger"	Jon Thatcher, Martin Smith, Stewart Smith, Stu Garrard, Tim Jupp	Delirious?	4:52
6.	"Lion"	Jamie Moore, Cary Barlowe, Rebecca St. James, Shaun Shakel	Rebecca St. James	3:49
7.	"New World"	Toby McKeehan, Christopher Stevens	tobyMac	3:16
8.	"I Will Believe"	Jay Joyce, Jill Tomalty, Nichole Nordeman	Nichole Nordeman	4:32
9.	"Turkish Delight"	David Crowder, Ed Cash, Jack Parker, Jason Solle, Mike Hogan	David Crowder Band	3:11
10.	"More than it Seems"	Aaron Sprinkle, Jon Micah Sumrall	Kutless	3:20
11.	"You're the One"	Chris Tomlin, Ed Cash, Jesse Reeves, Louie Giglio	Chris Tomlin	3:53
Total length:				42:09

=== Notes ===
- All songs are exclusive to this album except Delirious?'s track, which is available on their 2005 release The Mission Bell. An acoustic version of "Hero" appears on Bethany Dillon's album So Far: The Acoustic Sessions.

== Sheet music ==
A book of sheet music was published by Hal Leonard Corporation on January 1, 2006 featuring piano arrangements, guitar chords, and lyrics to the songs featured on this album.

== Charts ==
Chart (2005)	Peak position
U.S. Billboard 200	110
U.S. Billboard Top Christian Albums	7

== Awards ==
The compilation won an award at the Dove Awards at the 37th Annual Gospel Music Awards for Special Event Album of the Year. All contributing artists and producers received an award for their contribution.
