= What We Want, What We Get =

Studio album by Dave Barnes
- Released: April 6, 2010
- Studio: The Smoakstack (Nashville, Tennessee); Ed's (Franklin, Tennessee)
- Genre: CCM; Pop; Christian rock
- Length: 43:32
- Label: Razor & Tie
- Producer: Ed Cash; Dave Barnes

Dave Barnes chronology
| You, the Night, and Candlelight (2009) | What We Want, What We Get (2010) | Stories to Tell (2012) |

Singles from What We Want, What We Get
- 1. "God Gave Me You" Released: January 26, 2010; 2. "Little Lies" Released: 2010; 3. "Look So Easy" Released: 2010; 4. "What I Need" Released: 2011

Professional ratings
Review scores
| Source | Rating |
|---|---|
| AllMusic | 3/5 stars |

What We Want, What We Get is the fourth studio album released by the singer-songwriter Dave Barnes. It was released on April 6, 2010.

== Track listing ==
All tracks are written by Dave Barnes, except where noted

| No. | Title | Writer(s) | Length |
|---|---|---|---|
| 1. | "Little Lies" | | 2:47 |
| 2. | "God Gave Me You" | | 3:48 |
| 3. | "What I Need (ft. Jonny Lang)" | Dave Barnes; Gabe Dixon | 4:01 |
| 4. | "What We Want, What We Get" | | 3:40 |
| 5. | "Chameleon" | | 3:42 |
| 6. | "Someone's Somebody" | | 4:18 |
| 7. | "Something to Build Upon" (iTunes exclusive) | | 3:51 |
| 8. | "Look So Easy" | Dave Barnes; Trent Dabbs | 3:43 |
| 9. | "You Do the Same For Me" | | 5:20 |
| 10. | "My Love, My Enemy" | | 4:00 |
| 11. | "Amen" | | 4:16 |
| Total length: | | | 43:32 |

== Personnel ==
- Dave Barnes – vocals, acoustic guitars
- Ben Shive – keyboards
- Scott Cash – programming, backing vocals
- Paul Moak – electric guitars
- Andrew Ramsey – electric guitars, backing vocals
- Akil Thompson – electric guitars
- Jonny Lang – electric guitar solo (3), vocals (3)
- Dan Dugmore – steel guitar
- David Johnson – dobro
- David LaBruyere – bass
- Paul Mabury – drums
- Max Abrams – saxophone
- Roy Agee – trombone
- Steve Patrick – trumpet
- Ed Cash – backing vocals
- Annie Barnes – backing vocals
- Jason Eskridge – backing vocals
- Shannon Sanders – backing vocals
- Matt Wertz – backing vocals

=== Production ===
- Beka Tischker – A&R
- Dave Barnes – producer
- Ed Cash – producer, engineer
- Paul Moak – engineer
- Tom Laune – mixing at Bridgeway Studios (Nashville, Tennessee)
- Bob Ludwig – mastering at Gateway Mastering (Portland, Maine)
- Matt Lehman – design
- Leann Mueller – photography
- Amber Lehman – stylist

== Appearances in other media ==
- The song "God Gave Me You" was used in an episode of The Suite Life on Deck called "Prom Night". It also appeared on Blake Shelton's album Red River Blue.
- The song "Little Lies" was used in every ending of seasons 2 and 3 of Der Lehrer (The teacher), a German comedy series.

== Charts ==
| Chart | Peak position |
|---|---|
| US Billboard 200 | 59 |
| US Christian Albums (Billboard) | 3 |
| US Top Rock Albums (Billboard) | 17 |
