= Weights & Wings =

Studio album by Matt Wertz
- Released: March 15, 2011
- Studios: Sound Emporium and The Grip & The Panic Room (Nashville, Tennessee); The Compound Studio (Los Angeles, California)
- Genres: Alternative rock, indie rock, indie pop
- Length: 40:21
- Label: Handwritten/Nettwerk
- Producers: Brandon Hood; Jason Lehning

Matt Wertz chronology
Under Summer Sun (2008)	Weights & Wings (2011)	Heatwave (2013)

Weights & Wings is a studio album from singer-songwriter Matt Wertz. It was released on March 15, 2011, by both Handwritten Records and Nettwerk Music Group. It was produced by Brandon Hood and Jason Lehning. The album charted at No. 56 on The Billboard 200.

== Background ==
The album is the successor to Under Summer Sun that was released in 2008.

== Critical reception ==
Professional ratings
Review scores
Source	Rating
AllMusic	3/5 stars
CCM Magazine	4/5 stars
Indie Vision Music	4/5 stars
Melodic	3.5/5 stars

Weights & Wings garnered generally positive reviews from the ratings and reviews of music critics. At CCM Magazine, Grace S. Aspinwall rated the album four stars out of five, remarking how Wertz "produced another flawless album" and the release "is a clean, cheerful project brimming with brilliant love songs" that are "Smooth. Romantic. Timeless." William Ruhlmann of AllMusic rated the album three stars out of five, indicating that "pop singers like Matt Wertz are needed, and with any luck he'll have his moment of vicariously answering the needs of the audience he seeks, and selling some downloads by doing so." At Melodic, Rickard Holmgren rated the album three-and-a-half stars out of five, writing that "Matt Wertz delivers once again an album of high quality, the production fits the songs and you get both slow and up-tempo songs", and this is why it "could be the prefect soundtrack for the summer!" BMer of Indie Vision Music rated the album four stars out of five, stating that "Combining Matt's solid lyrics, his vulnerability and honesty, with his talent in song writing creates yet another solid album."

== Chart performance ==
For the Billboard charting week of April 2, 2011, Weights & Wings was No. 56 on the Billboard 200 albums chart, No. 11 on the Top Rock Albums chart. The album also reached No. 8 on both the Independent Albums and Digital Albums charts.

== Track listing ==
No.	Title	Writer(s)	Length
1.	"Don't Come Easy"	Matt Wertz	4:10
2.	"Everything Will Be Alright"	Wertz, Ben Rector	2:54
3.	"Nobody's You"	Wertz, Whitney Duncan	3:11
4.	"Running Back to You"	Wertz, Rector	4:34
5.	"Family"	Wertz, Chad Cates	4:08
6.	"For the First Time"	Wertz, Rector	3:46
7.	"Someone Like You"	Wertz, Dave Barnes	3:39
8.	"Feels So Right"	Wertz	2:25
9.	"Easier Tonight"	Wertz, Ben Caver	3:31
10.	"Gonna Be Good"	Wertz, Steven Moakler	4:01
11.	"Somebody's Gonna Love You"	Wertz, Moakler	4:02
Total length:			40:21

== Personnel ==
- Matt Wertz – lead vocals, backing vocals (1–4, 7, 9–11), acoustic guitar (2, 9)
- Jason Lehning – Wurlitzer electric piano (1), Roland Juno-60 (1, 11), electric guitar (1, 6, 9, 11), percussion (1, 2, 4, 10), keyboards (2), programming (2), lap steel guitar (2), bass (2), whistle (2), guitars (4, 10), Rhodes bass (4, 10, 11), Mellotron (9), acoustic piano (10), loops (10)
- Blair Masters – keyboards (3)
- John Deaderick – Hammond organ (4, 7, 9, 10), Mellotron (4), strings (4), Wurlitzer electric piano (7), acoustic piano (8, 10), organ (8)
- Lex Price – acoustic guitar (1, 2, 4, 6, 8–10), tenor guitar (1, 11), banjo (7), mandolin (7, 8)
- Daniel Tashian – electric guitar (1, 6, 8–10), acoustic guitar (2), ukulele (2)
- Jonathan Trebing – electric guitar (1, 4, 6, 8–10), slide guitar (10)
- Brandon Hood – guitars (3), mandolin (3), percussion (3)
- Nathan Dugger – electric guitar (4, 7, 9), acoustic guitar (7)
- Bryan Sutton – acoustic guitar (5, 11)
- Jason Goforth – lap steel guitar (5, 6, 9, 11), harmonica (6, 11)
- Justin Cary – bass (1, 6, 8–10)
- Wes Willett – bass (3)
- Matt Campbell – bass (4, 7)
- Viktor Krauss – bass (5)
- Dan Needham – drums (1, 4, 7, 10), percussion (7)
- Ian Fitchuk – drums (2, 6, 8, 9), tambourine (2), percussion (6, 8)
- Brian Barefoot – drums (3)
- Mockingbird Sun – handclaps (2, 8), gang vocals (2), backing vocals (6, 8)
- John Catchings – cello (5, 10)
- Tucker Perry – backing vocals (1)
- Ben Rector – backing vocals (2)
- Kate York – whistle (2)
- Rob Blackledge – backing vocals (3)
- Brett Taylor – backing vocals (3, 10)
- Dave Barnes – backing vocals (4, 9)
- Jill Phillips – backing vocals (5)

=== Production ===
- Jason Lehning – producer (1, 2, 4–11), recording (1, 2, 4–11)
- Brandon Hood – producer (3)
- Jordan Lehning – recording (1, 2, 4–11)
- Mark Hagen – tracking (3), overdubs (3), Pro Tools editing (3)
- Greg Goodman – additional recording (1, 2, 4–11)
- Gordon Hammond – assistant engineer (1, 2, 4–11)
- Allen Parker – additional overdubbing (3)
- Trey Keller – Pro Tools editing (3)
- F. Reid Shippen – mixing at Robot Lemon (Nashville, Tennessee)
- Erik "Keller" Jahner – mix assistant
- Greg Calbi – mastering at Sterling Sound (New York City, New York)
- Matt Lehman – design
- Steven Taylor – photography

== Charts ==
Chart (2011)	Peak position
US Billboard 200	56
US Digital Albums (Billboard)	8
US Independent Albums (Billboard)	8
US Top Rock Albums (Billboard)	11
