= God Gave Me You =

2010 single by Dave Barnes

Single by Dave Barnes

from the album What We Want, What We Get
- Released: January 26, 2010
- Genre: CCM
- Length: 3:48
- Label: Razor & Tie
- Songwriter: Dave Barnes
- Producers: Dave Barnes; Ed Cash

Dave Barnes singles chronology
"Loving You, Loving Me" (2009)	"God Gave Me You" (2010)	"Little Lies" (2010)

"God Gave Me You" is a song written and originally recorded by American contemporary Christian music singer Dave Barnes. It was released in January 2010 as the lead single from the album, What We Want, What We Get.

== History ==
Barnes wrote the song after the title came to him while he was walking through London, England. He told Country Weekly that "the lyrics just flowed together with the melody" when he wrote it. Barnes also said that he was inspired by his wife, Annie, who supported him "through all the ups and downs of an artist's career." After releasing it, he said that he received mail from fans who said that the song's message "saved marriages or became a theme for a couple's relationship."

== Music video ==
Barnes' version features a music video directed by Joey Boukadakis.

== Chart positions ==
Chart (2010)	Peak position
US Adult Contemporary (Billboard)	21
US Christian Songs (Billboard)	13

== Blake Shelton version ==
"God Gave Me You"

Single by Blake Shelton

from the album Red River Blue
- Released: July 25, 2011
- Recorded: 2011
- Genre: Country, CCM
- Length: 3:49
- Label: Warner Bros. Nashville
- Songwriter: Dave Barnes
- Producer: Scott Hendricks

Blake Shelton singles chronology
"Honey Bee" (2011)	"God Gave Me You" (2011)	"Drink on It" (2012)

In 2011, American country music singer Blake Shelton recorded the song on his 2011 album Red River Blue. His rendition was released in July 2011 as the album's second single. Shelton heard Barnes' version of the song on a contemporary Christian station, and said that it had inspired him to propose to then-girlfriend Miranda Lambert (now ex-wife); the music video included footage from Lambert the night before their wedding. On November 30, the song was nominated for the Grammy Award for Best Country Song.

=== Critical reception ===
Jessica Phillips of Country Weekly called the song "the romantic zenith of the album". Rolling Stone reviewer Will Hermes said that it was a "spirited cover" that "makes the most of its big, sculpted hooks". Jonathan Keefe of Slant Magazine was less favorable, saying in his review of the album, "His weakness for overwrought, schmaltzy pop ballads rears its head on second single 'God Gave Me You,' which sounds like something Bryan Adams or Foreigner would have recorded 20 years ago." Similarly, Melissa Mairz of Entertainment Weekly thought that it was a "schmaltzy power ballad". Engine 145 writer Karlie Justus gave it a thumbs-down, with her review saying that Shelton's "honest, vibrant vocal performance is nearly canceled out by a tinny instrumental mix of anonymous background vocals and a looping drum beat".

=== Music video ===
The music video was directed by Trey Fanjoy and premiered in September 2011. It features Blake and his band performing the song in a dark tunnel, with a video screen playing in the background. It also shows 3 different scenarios that end in happiness and joy: a waitress returning home to her daughter after a tough and rainy work day, a student (portrayed by Stirling Everly, the grandson of Don Everly of The Everly Brothers) on his first day of high school meeting a female classmate in class for the first time, and an EMT saving a man's life after an accident.

Before the song begins and at the end of the video, footage of Blake's then-fiancé Miranda Lambert is shown, and she goes on to say how proud she is to be his wife and best friend. Blake said at the time, “That footage made the video. If that footage wasn’t there, there would be no video.”

Due to Blake and Miranda's divorce in 2015, CMT took the video out of rotation (which it also did with his “Doin’ What She Likes” video, which features a phone conversation between Blake and Miranda), and GAC starts the video when the song starts, and ends it right before Miranda's final words to Blake.

=== Chart performance ===
"God Gave Me You" debuted at number 56 on the U.S. Billboard Hot Country Songs chart for the week of July 23, 2011, and it debuted at number 65 on the U.S. Billboard Hot 100 chart for the week of July 11, 2011. On the chart dated October 29, 2011, "God Gave Me You" became Shelton's fifth consecutive Number One single and his tenth overall. It has sold 2,514,000 copies in the United States as of November 2014.

=== Weekly charts ===
Chart (2011–2012)	Peak position
Canada Country (Billboard)	1
Canada Hot 100 (Billboard)	38
US Billboard Hot 100	22
US Hot Country Songs (Billboard)	1
US Adult Contemporary (Billboard)	29

=== Year-end charts ===
Annual chart rankings
Chart (2011)	Position
US Country Songs (Billboard)	18
US Billboard Hot 100	94

Chart (2012)	Position
US Country Songs (Billboard)	92
US Ringtones (Billboard)	3

=== Decade-end charts ===
Chart (2010–2019)	Position
US Hot Country Songs (Billboard)	19

=== Certifications ===
Region	Certification	Certified units/sales
United States (RIAA)	5× Platinum	2,514,000

== Other cover versions ==
- Husband and wife duo, Caleb and Kelsey Grimm, known as Caleb and Kelsey released a Country cover of this song in 2019. Caleb Grimm previously released three albums with the CCM band Anthem Lights.
- Reggae singer Johnny Suite released a cover of this song in 2022.
- Colombian singer Mauricio Rivera released a cover of this song in 2024.
