= Won't Let Go =

Studio album by Andrew Ripp
- Released: April 16, 2013
- Studio: The Art House, Nashville, US
- Length: 39:22
- Label: Be Music Entertainment
- Producer: Charlie Peacock

Andrew Ripp chronology
She Remains the Same (2010)	Won't Let Go (2013)	Simple (2014)

Won't Let Go is the third studio album released by singer-songwriter Andrew Ripp, released on April 16, 2013. It was produced by Charlie Peacock and recorded at the Art House in Nashville, Tennessee.

== Track listing ==
Won't Let Go track listing
No.	Title	Writer(s)	Length
1.	"Cool Ya (Nobody Loves You Like I Do)"	Andrew Ripp; Lisa Carver	2:42
2.	"Falling for the Beat"	Ripp; Chad Cates	3:21
3.	"Let Love Win"	Ripp; Jeff Pardo	3:22
4.	"When You Fall in Love"	Ripp; Zac Maloy	3:47
5.	"Won't Let Go"	Ripp; Carver	3:12
6.	"Just Enough"	Ripp; Chris DeStefano; Jason Matthews	3:26
7.	"Gone"	Ripp; Cates	3:50
8.	"Someone to Love You"	Ripp; Dave Barnes	3:23
9.	"Sooner or Later"	Ripp; Chris Rice	4:08
10.	"It Will Come"	Ripp; Rice	4:04
11.	"Rescue Me (featuring Vince Gill)"	Ripp; Rice	4:01
Total length:			39:22

== Charts ==
Chart performance for Won't Let Go
Chart (2013)	Peak position
US Heatseekers Albums (Billboard)	12
