= You, the Night, and Candlelight =

EP by Dave Barnes
- Released: February 3, 2009
- Genre: Pop; CCM; Country; Singer-songwriter; Alternative rock; Indie rock
- Length: 20:30
- Language: English
- Label: Razor & Tie
- Producer: Ed Cash

Dave Barnes chronology
Me and You and the World (2008)	You, the Night, and Candlelight (2009)	What We Want, What We Get (2010)

You, the Night, and Candlelight is the Valentine's Day EP of singer-songwriter Dave Barnes. It was released on February 3, 2009, between his third and fourth studio album.

== Track listing ==
All tracks are written by Dave Barnes, except where noted

No.	Title	Writer(s)	Length
1.	"Loving You, Loving Me"		5:01
2.	"I Have and Always Will"		4:06
3.	"My Girl"	Smokey Robinson; Ronnie White	3:09
4.	"Until You"		4:41
5.	"Home"		3:31
Total length:			20:30
