= Jericho (Andrew Ripp song) =

2020 song by Andrew Ripp

Single by Andrew Ripp

from the album Evergreen
- Released: August 21, 2020
- Recorded: 2020
- Genre: CCM; Contemporary worship music
- Length: 4:02
- Label: Andrew Ripp Music; Boxer Poet
- Songwriters: Andrew Ripp; Ethan Hulse
- Producer: Ethan Hulse

Andrew Ripp singles chronology
"SOS" (2020)	"Jericho" (2020)	"Tomorrow" (2021)

Music videos
- "Jericho" (Acoustic) on YouTube
- "Jericho" (Lyrics) on YouTube

"Jericho" is a song by American Contemporary Christian music singer-songwriter Andrew Ripp that was released via Boxer Poet on August 21, 2020, as the third single from his forthcoming studio album, Evergreen. Ripp co-wrote the song with Ethan Hulse.

"Jericho" became Ripp's debut entry on Billboard's US Hot Christian Songs chart, peaking at number four.

== Background ==
On July 31, 2020, Louder Than the Music reported that Andrew Ripp would be releasing "Jericho" as a single from his forthcoming album, Evergreen, on August 21, 2020. Ripp shared the story behind the song, saying:

The story of Jericho has always been super inspiring to me, which is why I wanted to turn it into a song. The part that really draws me in is when God says to Joshua, 'See, I have given you the city.' It wasn't the marching around the walls of Jericho that made them fall, it was the moment Joshua believed God over his circumstance that the city became his. Marching was just an exercise in faith and obedience.

"Jericho" impacted Christian radio stations in the United States on August 28, 2020.

== Composition ==
"Jericho" is composed in the key of B♭ major with a tempo of 71 beats per minute.

== Commercial performance ==
"Jericho" first appeared on the Christian Airplay chart, debuting at number 42 on the chart dated September 5, 2020. The song went reached a peak of number five on the December 12-dated chart, having charted for fifteen consecutive weeks on the chart.

"Jericho" made its debut at number 32 on Billboard's Hot Christian Songs chart dated September 26, 2020. The song broke through the top ten sector after spending eighteen consecutive weeks on the Hot Christian Songs chart, registering at number seven.

== Music videos ==
The lyric video of "Jericho" was published on August 29, 2020, on Andrew Ripps's YouTube channel. The acoustic music video of the song was uploaded on January 10, 2021, on Andrew Ripp's YouTube channel.

== Track listing ==
"Jericho"
No.	Title	Writer(s)	Length
1.	"Jericho"	Andrew Ripp; Ethan Hulse	3:23

"Jericho" (Acoustic)
No.	Title	Length
1.	"Jericho" (Acoustic)	3:29

== Charts ==
=== Weekly charts ===
Weekly chart performance for "Jericho"
Chart (2020–21)	Peak position
US Hot Christian Songs (Billboard)	4
US Christian Airplay (Billboard)	1
US Christian AC (Billboard)	1

=== Year-end charts ===
Year-end chart performance for "Jericho"
Chart (2020)	Position
US Christian Songs (Billboard)	91
Chart (2021)	Position
US Christian Songs (Billboard)	33
US Christian Airplay (Billboard)	11
US Christian AC (Billboard)	15

== Release history ==
Region	Date	Version	Format	Label	Ref.
Various	August 21, 2020	Studio	Digital download; streaming	Andrew Ripp Music; Boxer Poet	
United States	August 28, 2020	Studio	Christian radio	Andrew Ripp Music; Boxer Poet	
Various	January 8, 2021	Acoustic	Digital download; streaming	Andrew Ripp Music; Boxer Poet	
