= Bethany Dillon (album) =

2004 debut album by Bethany Dillon

Studio album by Bethany Dillon
- Released: April 20, 2004
- Recorded: 2003–2004
- Studio: Ed's and Sound Kitchen (Franklin, Tennessee); Masterlink Studio, Thelma's East and East Iris Studios (Nashville, Tennessee); Rome Recording Studios (Columbus, Ohio)
- Genre: CCM
- Length: 43:57
- Label: Sparrow
- Producer: Ed Cash; Joshua Moore

Bethany Dillon chronology
Bethany Dillon (2004)	Imagination (2005)

Professional ratings
Review scores
Source	Rating
Jesus Freak Hideout	link

Bethany Dillon is the self-titled debut album of contemporary Christian musician Bethany Dillon. It was released on April 20, 2004.

== Track listing ==
All songs written by Bethany Dillon, except where noted.

1. "Revolutionaries" – 4:17
2. "Great Big Mystery" (Dillon, Ed Cash) – 3:47
3. "Beautiful" (Dillon, Cash) – 4:01
4. "Move Forward" – 3:47
5. "For My Love" – 3:13
6. "All I Need" (Dillon, Cash, Dave Barnes) – 3:15
7. "Aimless" (Dillon, Cash) – 4:34
8. "Lead Me On" (Amy Grant, Michael W. Smith, Wayne Kirkpatrick) – 3:34
9. "Exodus (Faithful)" (Dillon, Cash) – 3:31
10. "Why" (Dillon, Joshua Moore) – 4:33
11. "A Voice Calling Out" – 5:16

== Personnel ==
- Bethany Dillon – lead vocals, backing vocals, acoustic guitar
- Joshua Moore – keyboards, accordion, electric guitars
- Ed Cash – programming, Wurlitzer electric piano, synthesizers, organ, acoustic guitar, electric guitars, banjo, mandolin, string arrangements and orchestrastion (2–5, 11)
- Ian Fitchuk – keyboards, Hammond B3 organ, electric guitars
- Ben Shive – keyboards, acoustic piano
- Tom Bukovac – acoustic guitar, electric guitars, slide guitar
- Mark Polack – bass
- Calvin Turner – bass
- Dan Needham – drums
- McKenzie Smith – drums
- Blair Masters – string arrangements and orchestrastion (2, 3, 11)
- Carl Marsh – string arrangements and orchestrastion (4, 5)
- Anthony LaMarchina – cello (2–5, 11)
- Kristin Wilkinson – viola (2–5, 11)
- David Angell – violin (2–5, 11)
- Conni Ellisor – violin (2–5, 11)
- Pamela Sixfin – violin (2–5, 11)
- Mary Kathryn Vanosdale – violin (2–5, 11)
- Katie Adelsberger – backing vocals

=== Production ===
- Brad O'Donnell – executive producer
- Joshua Moore – producer (1, 8, 10), additional engineer
- Ed Cash – producer (2–7, 9, 11), recording (2–7, 9, 11), mixing (3, 4, 6, 7, 9, 11)
- Shane D. Wilson – recording (1, 8, 10), mixing (1)
- Rob Clark – recording assistant (1, 8, 10)
- Jeff Farner – additional recording
- Adam Hatley – additional recording
- Justin Loucks – additional engineer
- Donnie Boutwell – additional Pro Tools editing
- J.R. McNeely – mixing (2, 8, 10)
- Jack Joseph Puig – mixing (5)
- Mike Paragone – mix assistant (1)
- Adam Dean – mix assistant (8, 10)
- Richard Dodd – mastering (1, 8, 10)
- Sarah Richmond – artist development
- Jan Cook – creative director
- Alexis Goodman – art direction, design
- Kristin Barlowe – photography

== Awards ==
On 2005, the album was nominated for a Dove Award for Pop/Contemporary Album of the Year at the 36th GMA Dove Awards.
