= Everything in Between (Matt Wertz album) =

Album by Matt Wertz

Studio album by Matt Wertz
- Released: February 2007
- Recorded: March 1, 2005 to May 3, 2006
- Studio: Ed's (Franklin, Tennessee)
- Genre: Acoustic, rock
- Length: 33:47
- Label: Aware
- Producer: Ed Cash

Matt Wertz chronology
Today & Tomorrow EP (2005)	Everything in Between (2007)	Under Summer Sun (2008)

Everything in Between is the third album released by the American singer-songwriter Matt Wertz. It his first on the major label Nettwerk.

The track "Over You" is featured in a 2006 episode of Laguna Beach.

== Track listing ==
All songs written by Matt Wertz, except where noted:

1. "The Way I Feel" (Wertz, Dave Barnes, Ed Cash) - 3:21
2. "Carolina" - 3:02
3. "Heartbreaker" (Wertz, Justin Rosolino) - 2:43
4. "Over You" - 3:13
5. "5:19" (Wertz, Chad Cates) - 3:10
6. "I Will Not Take My Love Away" - 2:24
7. "Like the Last Time" - 3:02
8. "With You, Tonight" (Wertz, Barnes) - 4:08
9. "Naturally" (Wertz, Ian Fitchuk, Justin Loucks) - 3:28
10. "Capitol City" - 5:20

== Personnel ==
- Matt Wertz – lead vocals, backing vocals, acoustic guitars, keyboards (4)
- Ed Cash – keyboards, programming, acoustic guitars, electric guitars, mandolin, bass guitar, backing vocals
- Ben Shive – keyboards
- Justin Rosolino – electric guitars (3, 7)
- Alex Florez – nylon guitar (9)
- Calvin Turner – bass guitar
- Josh Robinson – drums (1, 5, 8, 9)
- Chad Gilmore – drums (2, 3, 7, 10)
- Chad Kinner – drums (4)
- Marc Broussard – vocals (1)
- Brandon Heath – vocals (2)
- Dave Barnes – backing vocals (5)
- Rob Blackledge – backing vocals (5)
- Josh Hoge – vocals (9)

=== Production ===
- Dave Barnes – A&R direction, co-producer (1, 2, 5, 8)
- Ed Cash – producer, engineer, recording, mixing
- Matt Wertz – co-producer
- Stewart Whitmore – digital editing
- Stephen Marcussen – mastering
- Marcussen Mastering (Hollywood, California) – editing and mastering location
- Matt Lehman – design
- Jeremy Cowart – photography
- Jess Aston – management
- Dalton Sim – management
- Nettwerk Management – management
