= Andrew Ripp =

American singer-songwriter (born 1982)

Andrew Michael Ripp
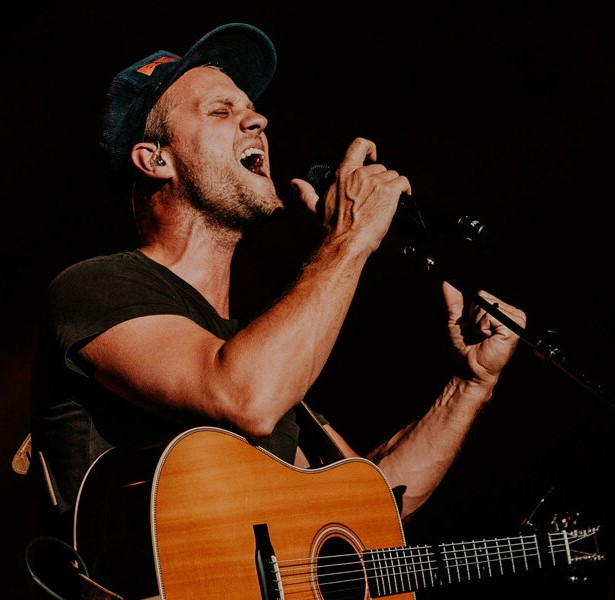
- Ripp performing in 2021

Background information
- Born: August 24, 1982 (age 44); Palatine, Illinois, U.S.
- Genres: Pop rock; acoustic; contemporary Christian
- Occupations: Singer; songwriter
- Instruments: Vocals, guitar, piano
- Years active: 2004–present
- Labels: Get Ripp'd Music; Be Music & Entertainment; Holly Street
- Website: andrewripp.com

Andrew Michael Ripp is an American singer and Grammy-nominated songwriter based in Nashville. He broke into the national music scene as a songwriter; his contributions including Ryan Cabrera's album, You Stand Watching, have been on the Billboard Hot 100, Top 40 Mainstream, Pop 100 Airplay, Pop 100, and Hot Digital Songs charts. He has released five studio albums. Ripp's second album, She Remains the Same, was released on September 21, 2010, breaking the top 100 on the Billboard new artists chart. His third album, Won't Let Go, was produced by Grammy Award winner Charlie Peacock and was released on April 16, 2013, via Be Music & Entertainment.

In 2020, Ripp was nominated for a Grammy Award for co-writing the song "Rescue Story" by Zach Williams.

Ripp hosted two seasons of Words at the Well on K-Love On Demand, a live recording in a writer's round style featuring Christian songwriters from Koinonia Bookstore (now The Well in Nashville) ondemand.klove.com/words-at-the-well

== Music career ==
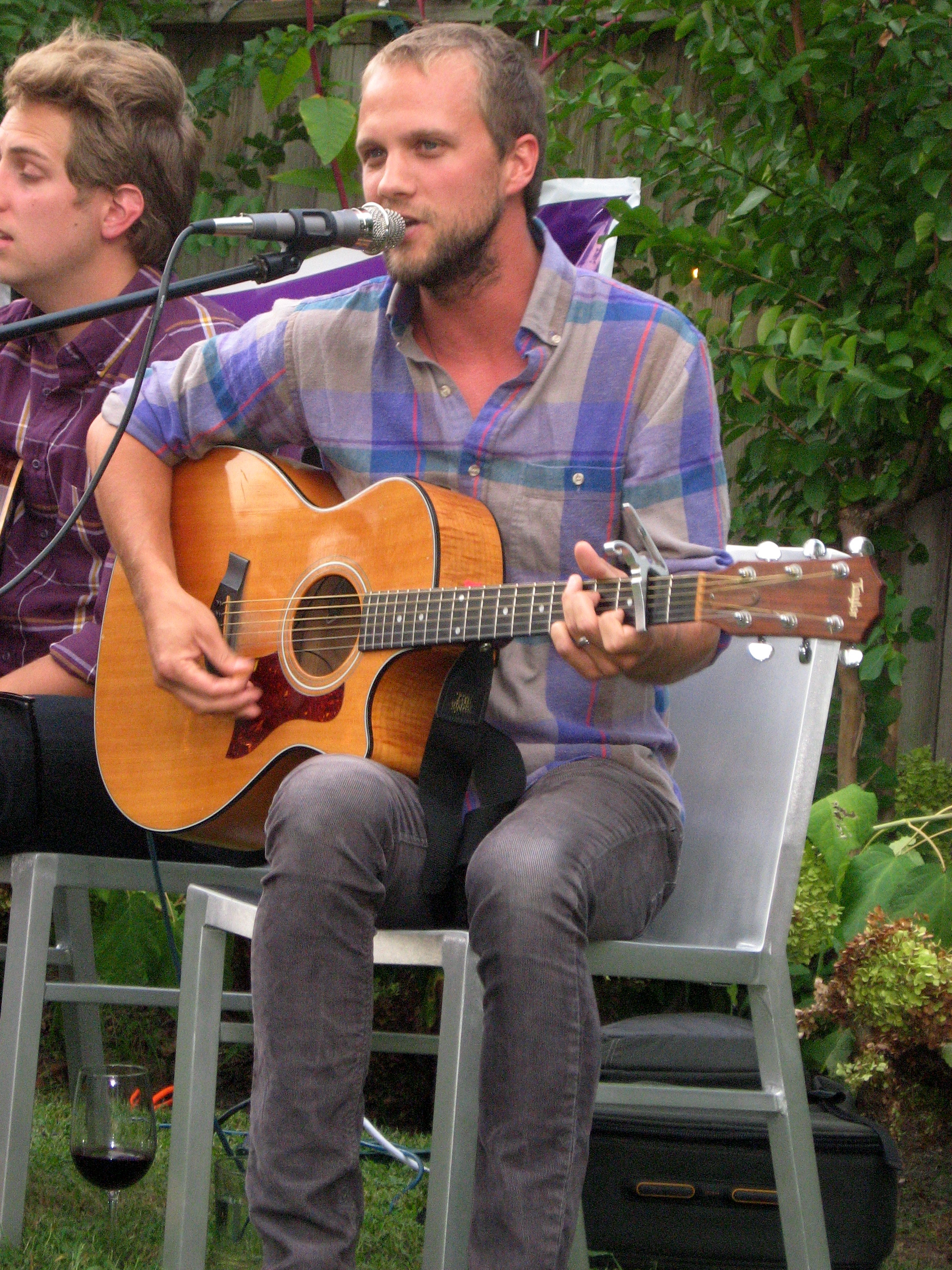
Ripp on the right, Ben Rector on the left at Rumours East in East Nashville, August 2010

Ripp released his debut album, Fifty Miles to Chicago, in January 2008. Musicians Pete Maloney (Dishwalla and Tonic), keyboard player Will Hollis (The Eagles), and steel guitar player Eric Heywood (Ray LaMontagne) were brought in to accompany Ripp's vocals and guitar.

Ripp co-wrote and co-produced Fifty Miles to Chicago with songwriter Randy Coleman and brought on Dan Lavery, former bass player of the rock band Tonic, as producer. Funded by Ripp himself, the majority of the album was recorded in the studio in the back of Lavery's house in Los Angeles. In early 2008, Ripp was invited to attend the annual "Fool's Banquet" songwriters gathering in Tulsa, Oklahoma. The event was hosted by the Hanson brothers. Also in attendance that year were Pat McGee of the Pat McGee Band, Keaton Simons, Jesse Laz-Hirsch, Kai Kennedy, Stephen Kellogg, Chris Sligh, and Jason Mraz.

Operating independently of a label, Ripp tours regularly and has shared the stage with Andy Grammer, Parachute, Ben Rector, Robert Randolph and the Family Band, Fiction Family (Jon Foreman of Switchfoot, Sean Watkins of Nickel Creek, Stephen Kellogg and the Sixers, and Sara Bareilles among others. In the spring of 2009, Ripp and his band toured Europe and the Middle East on a tour sponsored by Armed Forces Entertainment for the U.S. troops. In late 2011, he opened for the band Jars of Clay.

Ripp's highly acclaimed second album, She Remains the Same was released in September 2010. The album was produced by Dave Barnes, with whom Ripp toured in the late 2010. On November 22, 2011, Ripp released the Christmas EP, Light of Mine. Ripp released his third album, Won't Let Go, on April 16, 2013, via Be Music & Entertainment. It was produced by Grammy winning Charlie Peacock, and features the singles "Cool Ya (Nobody Loves You Like I Do) and "Falling for the Beat". "Falling for the Beat was featured on season 3, episode 2 of the TV Show House of Lies on Showtime. Ripp spent 2013 touring with Sara Bareilles, Plain White T's, Andy Grammer, and Parachute.

On January 21, 2014, Ripp released a stripped down acoustic record entitled "Simple". "Simple" was produced by Paul Mabury and features acoustic versions of ten tracks from his record "Won't Let Go" in addition to a cover of Justin Timberlake's "Mirrors". Ripp hit the road in March 2014 with Judah & the Lion for his first ever headlining tour. The tour began in Dallas and made stops in major cities including Minneapolis, Chicago, Nashville, Atlanta, Charlotte, New York City, Boston, and Cincinnati with many sold-out shows.

== Discography ==
=== Albums ===
List of albums, with selected chart positions
Title	Album details	Peak chart positions
Title	Album details	US Heat.
Fifty Miles to Chicago	Debut album; Released: July 1, 2008; Label: Get Ripp'd Music; Format: Digital download, streaming	—
She Remains the Same	Released: September 21, 2010; Label: Get Ripp'd Music; Format: Digital download, streaming	—
Won't Let Go	Released: April 16, 2013; Label: Be Music & Entertainment; Format: CD, digital download, streaming	12
Simple	Released: January 21, 2014; Label: Be Music & Entertainment; Format: Digital download, streaming	30
Andrew Ripp	Released: October 16, 2015; Label: Be Music & Entertainment; Format: Digital download, streaming	6
Evergreen	Released: May 14, 2021; Label: Andrew Ripp Music; Format: Digital download, streaming	—
The Mercy Room	Released: September 26, 2025; Label: Holy Street Records; Format: Digital download, streaming	—
"—" denotes a recording that did not chart

=== Extended plays ===
List of extended plays
Title	EP details
The Heart	Released: August 24, 2018; Label: Andrew Ripp; Format: Digital download, streaming
The Soul	Released: November 29, 2019; Label: Andrew Ripp; Format: Digital download, streaming

=== Singles ===
List of singles and peak chart positions
Title	Year	Chart positions					Album
Title	Year	US Christ	US Christ Air	US Christ AC	US Christ Digital	US Christ Stream	Album
"God Knows (Must Be Love)"	2019	—	34	28	—	—	The Heart (EP)
"Joy to the World"	2019	—	—	—	—	—	Non-album single
"Back to Brooklyn"	2020	—	—	—	—	—	Evergreen
"SOS" (featuring Harvest)	2020	—	—	—	—	—	Evergreen
"Jericho"	2020	4	1	1	13	23	Evergreen
"Tomorrow"	2021	—	—	—	—	—	Evergreen
"Rejoice"	2021	28	18	18	—	—	Evergreen
"Joy to the World"	2021	—	45	—	—	—	Non-album singles
"Fill My Cup"	2022	2	1	1	20	14	Non-album singles
"The Lord's Prayer"	2022	—	—	—	—	—	Non-album singles
"In Good Hands"	2022	—	—	—	—	—	Non-album singles
"For the Love of God"	2022	10	10	5	—	—	Non-album singles
"Made For This"	2022	—	—	—	—	—	Non-album singles
"Big Feelings"	2023	—	—	—	—	—	Non-album singles
"Roses"	2023	—	35	—	—	—	Non-album singles
"Somebody to You" (with Rachael Lampa)	2023	12	10	9	18	—	Non-album singles
"Wide as the World"	2023	—	—	—	—	—	The Mercy Room
"Love’s Got A Way"	2024	11	5	5	—	—	The Mercy Room
"Run"	2024	—	—	—	—	—	The Mercy Room
"Light of Heaven"	2024	—	—	—	—	—	The Mercy Room
"City on a Hill"	2024	—	—	—	—	—	The Mercy Room
"Breakdown"	2025	19	16	11	—	—	The Mercy Room
"Fences"	2025	—	—	—	—	—	The Mercy Room
"On the Inside"	2025	—	—	—	—	—	The Mercy Room
"I'd Do It Again"	2026	20	12	7	—	—	Non-album single
"Cedar and Stone"	2026	—	—	—	—	—	Non-album single
"Tabernacle" (with Josh Baldwin)	2026	—	—	—	—	—	Non-album single
"Silence"	2026	—	—	—	—	—	Non-album single
"Hold Me Up" (with Jervis Campbell)	2026	19	14	11	—	—	Non-album single
"—" denotes a recording that did not chart.
