= Waking Up (Bethany Dillon album) =

Studio album by Bethany Dillon
- Released: April 3, 2007
- Recorded: 2006–2007
- Studio: Ed's and Bridgeway Studio (Franklin, Tennessee); Spaceway Studios (Dallas, Texas); The Village Recorder (Los Angeles, California)
- Genre: Christian, CCM
- Length: 53:41
- Label: Sparrow Records
- Producer: Ed Cash; John Alagía; Will Hunt

Bethany Dillon chronology
Imagination (2005)	Waking Up (2007)	So Far: The Acoustic Sessions (2008)

Waking Up is the third studio album from Bethany Dillon. It was released on April 3, 2007. It contains the singles "the Kingdom", and "When You Love Someone".

== Track listing ==
All songs written by Bethany Dillon except where noted.

1. "The Kingdom" – 4:03
2. "Come Find Me" (Lyrics: Dillon; Music: Dillon, Ed Cash) – 4:31
3. "Waking Up" – 4:06
4. "Something There" – 3:24
5. "Let Your Light Shine" (Dillon, Cash) – 4:01
6. "Change" – 3:28
7. "Top of the World" (Dillon, Cash) – 3:54
8. "Tell Me" – 4:36
9. "Are You Sure?" – 4:23
10. "When You Love Someone" (Dillon, Cash) – 3:29
11. "You Could Be The One" – 3:53
12. "Beggar's Heart" – 4:45
13. "You Are On Our Side" – 5:08

== Personnel ==
- Bethany Dillon – lead vocals, backing vocals, acoustic guitar
- Ed Cash – programming, acoustic piano, organ, acoustic guitar, electric guitar, bass, percussion, backing vocals
- Chad Copelin – keyboards
- David Hodges – keyboards, acoustic piano, backing vocals
- Will Hunt – Wurlitzer electric piano, programming, drums, percussion
- Gary Burnette – acoustic guitar, electric guitar
- Mark Goldberg – guitars
- Paul Moak – electric guitar
- Todd Cromwell – bass
- Byron House – upright bass
- Sean Hurley – bass
- Matt Chamberlain – drums, percussion
- Rick Woolstenhume Jr. – drums
- Steve Blacke – cello, viola, violin, string arrangements
- Leanne Palmore, Christie Richardson, Jerard Woods and Jovaun Woods – choir

=== Production ===
- Brad O'Donnell – executive producer
- Ed Cash – producer (1–3, 5, 7, 9, 10), recording (1–3, 5, 7, 9, 10), mixing (1–3, 5, 7, 9, 10)
- John Alagía – producer (4, 8, 11), mixing (4, 8, 11)
- Will Hunt – producer (6, 12, 13)
- Brian Scheuble – recording (4, 8, 11), engineer (4, 8, 11), mixing (4, 8, 11)
- Jeff Roninette – engineer (4, 8, 11)
- Josh Davis – engineer (6, 12, 13)
- Tom Laune – mixing (6, 12, 13)
- George Marino – mastering at Sterling Sound (New York City, New York)
- Jess Chambers – A&R administration
- Jan Cook – creative director
- Tim Frank – art direction
- Keith Johnson – design
- Kristin Barlowe – photography
- Dryve Artist Management – management
