= Turns to Gold =

Studio album by Gabe Dixon
- Released: April 8, 2016
- Genre: Pop rock, Alternative rock
- Label: Rolling Ball Records
- Producer: Paul Moak

Gabe Dixon chronology
One Spark (2011)	Turns to Gold (2016)

Turns to Gold is the second album of American singer and pianist Gabe Dixon. It was released on April 8, 2016, on Dixon's own label, Rolling Ball Records. The album is produced by Paul Moak and features a duet with Natalie Prass entitled "The Way To Love Me".

In his first solo album One Spark, he would play primarily grand piano. However, on Turns to Gold, he performed all but one song on an upright piano. This choice conveyed a different energy. He and the musicians, including Jano Rix on drums (The Gabe Dixon Band, The Wood Brothers), Viktor Krauss on bass (Lyle Lovett), and Kris Donegan on guitar (Cam), cut everything to analog tape with no click track. The album also features vocal performances by Jason Eskridge, Garrison Starr and Boots Ottestad. Mastering was done by Brad Blackwood at Euphonics Mastering.

== Track listing ==
1. "Holding Her Freedom" (3:52)
2. "Crave" (2:47)
3. "Don't Make Me" (3:38)
4. "The One Thing" (4:52)
5. "Flow Like Wine" (2:44)
6. "Same Place" (2:08)
7. "If I Love You" (4:29)
8. "That Redemption" (3:44)
9. "The Way to Love Me" (feat. Natalie Prass) (4:15)
10. "These Wheels" (3:35)
11. "Devil and the Deep Blue Sea" (3:47)
12. "Live Again" (3:07)
