= Remembering You =

2005 single by Steven Curtis Chapman

Single by Steven Curtis Chapman

from the album Music Inspired by The Chronicles of Narnia: The Lion, the Witch and the Wardrobe
- Released: August 5, 2005
- Recorded: 2005
- Studio: Ed Cash's house
- Genre: Pop
- Length: 3:52
- Label: EMI CMG
- Composers: Caleb Chapman; Steven Curtis Chapman; David Campbell
- Lyricists: Caleb Chapman; Steven Curtis Chapman
- Producers: Ed Cash; Steven Curtis Chapman

Steven Curtis Chapman singles chronology
| "Believe Me Now" (2005) | "Remembering You" (2005) | "All I Really Want for Christmas" (2005) |

"Remembering You" is a song by American contemporary Christian music singer-songwriter Steven Curtis Chapman. Written and composed by Chapman, Caleb Chapman, and David Campbell, it was released in August 2005 as the first single from the soundtrack album Music Inspired by The Chronicles of Narnia: The Lion, the Witch and the Wardrobe (2005), a collection of songs recorded by contemporary Christian music artists that was released to promote the upcoming Walt Disney Pictures film The Chronicles of Narnia: The Lion, the Witch, and the Wardrobe to Christian audiences. A pop song with Celtic and folk influences, and a prominent string section, the song is written from the perspective of the characters in The Lion, the Witch, and the Wardrobe at the end of the story.

"Remembering You" received positive reviews from music critics, who praised the sound and considered it a highlight of the album. It was released to Christian radio stations on August 5, 2005, and ranked as one of the most-played songs of 2006 on Christian radio. It peaked at number nine on the Billboard Christian Songs and number 22 on the Billboard Adult Contemporary charts respectively.

== Background and recording ==
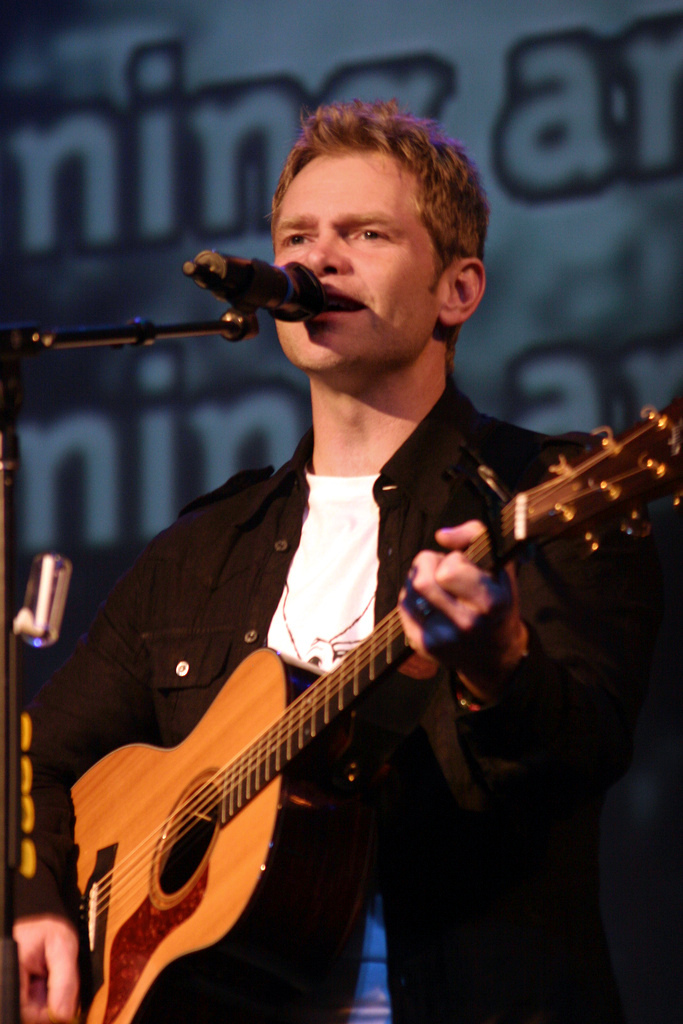
Chapman was one of many Christian artists featured on the soundtrack, the "centerpiece" of Disney's outreach to Christian audiences.

Following the success of The Passion of the Christ (2004), movie studios had become more open to targeting films at Christian audiences. In promotion of the December 2005 release of the Walt Disney Pictures film The Chronicles of Narnia: The Lion, the Witch and the Wardrobe, adapted from the novel by C. S. Lewis, Disney sought to promote the film to Christian audiences, as the original novel had become widely popular among this audience due to its spiritual themes. The soundtrack album Music Inspired by The Chronicles of Narnia: The Lion, the Witch and the Wardrobe, which featured a variety of popular contemporary Christian artists, was the "centerpiece" of the film's outreach strategy to Christian audiences.

Chapman had learned of the production behind a Narnia film from a friend who worked at Disney. Chapman was not shown the completed film, but was given access to part of the script and was advised to read the novel. Though Chapman had already read most of Lewis's Christian theological works, he had never read any of the Narnia books before. After reading the Narnia books, Chapman was impressed and felt that Lewis was able to relate the story of Jesus in a way that people of any age could understand. Chapman had several ideas for songs, ultimately settling on "Remembering You", as he felt it best represented the "essence" of the novel.

"Remembering You" was written by Steven Curtis Chapman and Caleb Chapman, while the string section was composed by David Campbell. The song was produced by Ed Cash and Steven Curtis Chapman. It was recorded at Cash's house and mixed at Resonate Music in Burbank, California. In addition to the lead vocals, Steven Curtis Chapman performed acoustic guitar, banjo, dulcimer, and electric guitar and electric guitar on the song; Cash performed mandolin in addition to backing vocals.

== Composition ==
Remembering You
Music critics characterized "Remembering You" as a pop song, noting Celtic and folk influences.

"Remembering You" has a length of three minutes and 52 seconds. The song is set in 3/4 time in the key of A major and has a tempo of 151 beats per minute; Chapman's vocal range in the song spans from C_{2} to E_{5}. Music critics described it as a pop song, with some noting Celtic and folk influences, as well as its prominent usage of strings throughout. Russ Breimeier of Christianity Today described the song as being similar in style to many of Chapman's previous singles. Several critics noted that the song could be seen as representing the story in The Lion, the Witch, and the Wardrobe or having a Christian message. During the song, Chapman references Aslan's meetings with the Pevensies, singing "I found you in the most unlikely way/But really it was you who found me, and I found myself in the gifts that you gave".

According to Chapman, "Remembering You" is set at the end of The Lion, the Witch, and the Wardrobe from the perspective of the main characters, with them saying that whenever they see the beginning of spring, the characters would remember what Aslan had done and what would be coming in the future; he felt that this was where the story had left him at and wanted to "capture" it in the song. Chapman said that he loved the ending of the story because "it is really just a beginning, and you know there’s so much more to come. That’s the story of God’s grace, too".

== Release and promotion ==
"Remembering You" was released as the first single from Music Inspired by The Chronicles of Narnia: The Lion, the Witch and the Wardrobe. The song was serviced to US Christian radio stations on August 3, 2005 and was released for digital download on August 23, 2005. Although the songs on the album were written by Christian artists, EMI aimed to market it to both Christian and secular radio stations as part of a two-tiered promotion for the upcoming film release in December, with Disney "aggressively courting" Christian audiences while trying to avoid alienating secular audiences. Plans for an additional soundtrack featuring secular musicians were scrapped, leaving the Christian Inspired By album as the only soundtrack album released in promotion of the film.

The accompanying music video for "Remembering You" was released online via the Yahoo! News homepage on December 6, 2005. The video features scenes from the film cut with scenes of Chapman performing. It was shot in southern California and used several of the sets that were included in the film, including the lamppost. The visual used potato flakes to simulate the appearance of snow, which represent evil in the book and film.

"Remembering You" began receiving airplay on mainstream radio before appearing on Christian radio, charting at number 34 on the Radio & Records Adult Contemporary chart by December 2005. "Remembering You" peaked the Billboard Christian Songs, Christian AC Songs, and Adult Contemporary charts at numbers nine, seven, and 22, respectively. On the Radio & Records Christian AC, Christian AC Indicator, and INSPO charts, it peaked at numbers eight, seven, and three, respectively. The song ranked on the 2006 year-end Billboard Christian Songs and Christian AC Songs charts, respectively, as well as the year-end Radio & Records Christian AC chart.

== Critical reception and accolades ==
"Remembering You" was received positively by music critics. Christa Bannister of CCM Magazine praised the song's string arrangement and Celtic influences. Breimeier praised the song for "[stacking] up to similar hits from his most recent albums" but felt it did not tie in closely enough to the story, saying it "more naturally characterizes itself as a "'God manifested in nature' piece" than a song about Narnia". Brian Carr of Cross Rhythms praised the song for being "edgy" and said that it "unfalteringly keeps [the album’s] pace up". Jesus Freak Hideout's John DiBiase called the song one of the best on the album and praised its arrangement, which he compared to the 1990s work of Jars of Clay.

At the 37th GMA Dove Awards, Music Inspired by The Chronicles of Narnia: The Lion, the Witch and the Wardrobe won the award for Special Event Album of the Year; Chapman was recognized along with all the other artists featured on the album, and the award marked his 50th Dove Award, a total that was unmatched by any artist at a major award show at that point.

== Track listings ==
Digital single

1. "Remembering You (Narnia Album Version)" – 3:52

Performance tracks EP

1. "Remembering You (Key-A-Premiere Performance Plus W/ Background Vocals)" – 4:01
2. "Remembering You (Performance Track In Key Of Gb)" – 4:00
3. "Remembering You (Performance Track In Key Of C)" – 4:00
4. "Remembering You (Narnia Album Version)" – 3:52

== Personnel ==
Credits adapted from the album liner notes

- Ed Cash – backing vocals, mandolin, recording, producing, programming
- David Campbell – composer
- Caleb Chapman – composer
- Steven Curtis Chapman – acoustic guitar, banjo, composer, dulcimer, electric guitar, producing, vocals
- Jim Hoke – whistle
- Dmitar Krnjaic – mixing
- Chris Lord-Alge – mixing
- Dan Needham – drums
- Stephen Sharp – recording
- Chris Young – bass guitar

== Charts ==
=== Weekly ===
Weekly chart performance for "Remembering You"
| Chart (2006) | Peak position |
|---|---|
| US Adult Contemporary (Billboard) | 22 |
| US Hot Christian Songs (Billboard) | 9 |

=== Year-end ===
Year-end chart performance for "Remembering You"
| Chart (2006) | Position |
|---|---|
| US Hot Christian Songs (Billboard) | 33 |

== Release history ==
| Date | Label | Format | Country | Ref. |
|---|---|---|---|---|
| August 5, 2005 | EMI CMG | Christian radio | United States | |
| August 23, 2005 | Sparrow | Digital download | United States | |
| October 23, 2009 | Sparrow | Digital EP | United States | |
