= So Far: The Acoustic Sessions =

Bethany Dillon

Studio album by Bethany Dillon
- Released: April 1, 2008
- Recorded: 2007
- Studio: The Oldest Bird (Nashville, Tennessee)
- Genre: CCM
- Length: 38:02
- Language: English
- Label: Sparrow
- Producer: Ian Fitchuk; Justin Loucks

Bethany Dillon chronology
Waking Up (2007)	Bethany Dillon (2008)

So Far: The Acoustic Sessions is a 2008 album by contemporary Christian music artist Bethany Dillon.

== Track listing ==
All songs written by Bethany Dillon and Ed Cash, except where noted.

1. "Dreamer" - 3:50
2. "When You Love Someone" - 3:40
3. "We Can Work It Out" (John Lennon, Paul McCartney) - 2:31
4. "Top Of The World" - 4:02
5. "Hallelujah" - 4:26
6. "All I Need" (Dillon, Cash, Dave Barnes) - 3:19
7. "The Kingdom" (Dillon) - 4:02
8. "Hero" (Dillon) - 3:41
9. "Beautiful" - 4:07
10. "Let Your Light Shine" - 4:29

== Personnel ==
- Bethany Dillon – vocals
- Ian Fitchuk – acoustic piano, acoustic guitars, bass, drums, percussion, backing vocals
- Courtlan Clement – acoustic guitars, mandolin
- Adam Binder – bass guitar
- Claire Indie – cello

=== Production ===
- Brad O'Donnell – A&R
- Ian Fitchuk – producer
- Justin Loucks – producer, recording, mixing
- Bob Boyd – mastering at Ambient Digital (Houston, Texas)
- Jess Chambers – A&R administration
- Tim Frank – art direction
- Keith Johnson – design
- Kristin Barlowe – photography
