= Golden Days (Dave Barnes album) =

Studio album by Dave Barnes
- Released: January 28, 2014
- Genre: Alternative rock; Indie rock; Singer-songwriter; CCM; Country
- Length: 39:06
- Label: 50 Year Plan Records
- Producer: Ed Cash, Dave Barnes

Dave Barnes chronology
Stories to Tell (2012)	Golden Days (2014)	Carry On, San Vicente (2016)

Singles from Golden Days
- 1. "Good" Released: 2013

Professional ratings
Review scores
Source	Rating
AllMusic	3.5/5 stars
CCM Magazine	4/5 stars

Golden Days is the sixth studio album by American singer-songwriter Dave Barnes. It his first full-length album to be released on 50 Year Plan Records.

== Track listing ==
All tracks are written by Dave Barnes, except where noted.

No.	Title	Writer(s)	Length
1.	"Twenty Three"		3:55
2.	"Loving Los Angeles"		3:42
3.	"Good"		4:03
4.	"All She Wants Is You"		3:22
5.	"Little Civil War" (featuring Lucie Silvas)	Dave Barnes; Lucie Silvas; Jeremy Spillman	3:32
6.	"Something More"		3:17
7.	"Heartbroken Down"		3:23
8.	"By Two"		3:54
9.	"Can't She Try"		3:12
10.	"Sharon Sue"		3:07
11.	"Hotel Keys"	Dave Barnes; David Nail	3:36
