= Carry On, San Vicente =

Studio album by Dave Barnes
- Released: March 18, 2016
- Genre: Singer-songwriter; Country
- Length: 33:14
- Label: 50 Year Plan Records
- Producer: Ed Cash, Dave Barnes

Dave Barnes chronology
Golden Days (2014)	Carry On, San Vicente (2016)	Who Knew It Would Be So Hard To Be Myself (2018)

Carry On, San Vicente is the seventh studio album from singer-songwriter Dave Barnes. This album's sound has been influenced by artists such as Fleetwood Mac, Jackson Browne, and The Eagles, with a '70s aesthetic.

== Track listing ==
All tracks are written by Dave Barnes, except where noted.

No.	Title	Writer(s)	Length
1.	"She's The One I Love"		3:16
2.	"Carry On, San Vicente"		3:57
3.	"Wildflower"	Dave Barnes; Ed Cash	4:31
4.	"Glow Like the Moon"		3:15
5.	"Sunset, Santa Fe"		3:46
6.	"Honey, I'm Coming Home"		2:53
7.	"Nothing Like You"		4:22
8.	"Need Your Love"		3:21
9.	"Wildfire Heart"		3:53
Total length:			33:14
