= Bethany Dillon =

American musician (born 1988)

Background information
- Also known as: Bethany Barnard
- Born: September 22, 1988 (age 38); Bellefontaine, Ohio
- Genres: CCM, acoustic
- Label: Sparrow
- Website: bethanybarnard.com

Bethany Barnard (née Dillon; born September 22, 1988) is a Contemporary Christian music artist. Her self-titled 2004 debut album was the highest selling female solo debut for that year, and attracted Gospel Music Association nominations for both Female Vocalist and New Artist of the Year. Her album Waking Up (2007) included production assistance of the GMA's 2005 Producer of the Year, Ed Cash, as well Will Hunt and John Alagia. Her sixth and seventh albums were Stop & Listen (2009) and A Better Word (2017).

Barnard's work has appeared on the soundtrack albums of several feature films, including the single "Hero" in Dreamer (2005, from her second album, Imagination of that year), as well as singles for the Music Inspired by The Chronicles of Narnia: The Lion, the Witch and the Wardrobe (2005) and Bridge to Terabithia (2007). Dillon wed Shane Barnard of Shane & Shane on March 29, 2008, and began producing her music as Bethany Barnard from that date.

== Childhood and early education ==
Bethany Barnard was born on September 22, 1988, in Bellefontaine, Ohio. Her birth name was Bethany Adelsberger. She has said that she started playing guitar at age 10, with Jennifer Knapp serving as an early influence.

== Music career ==
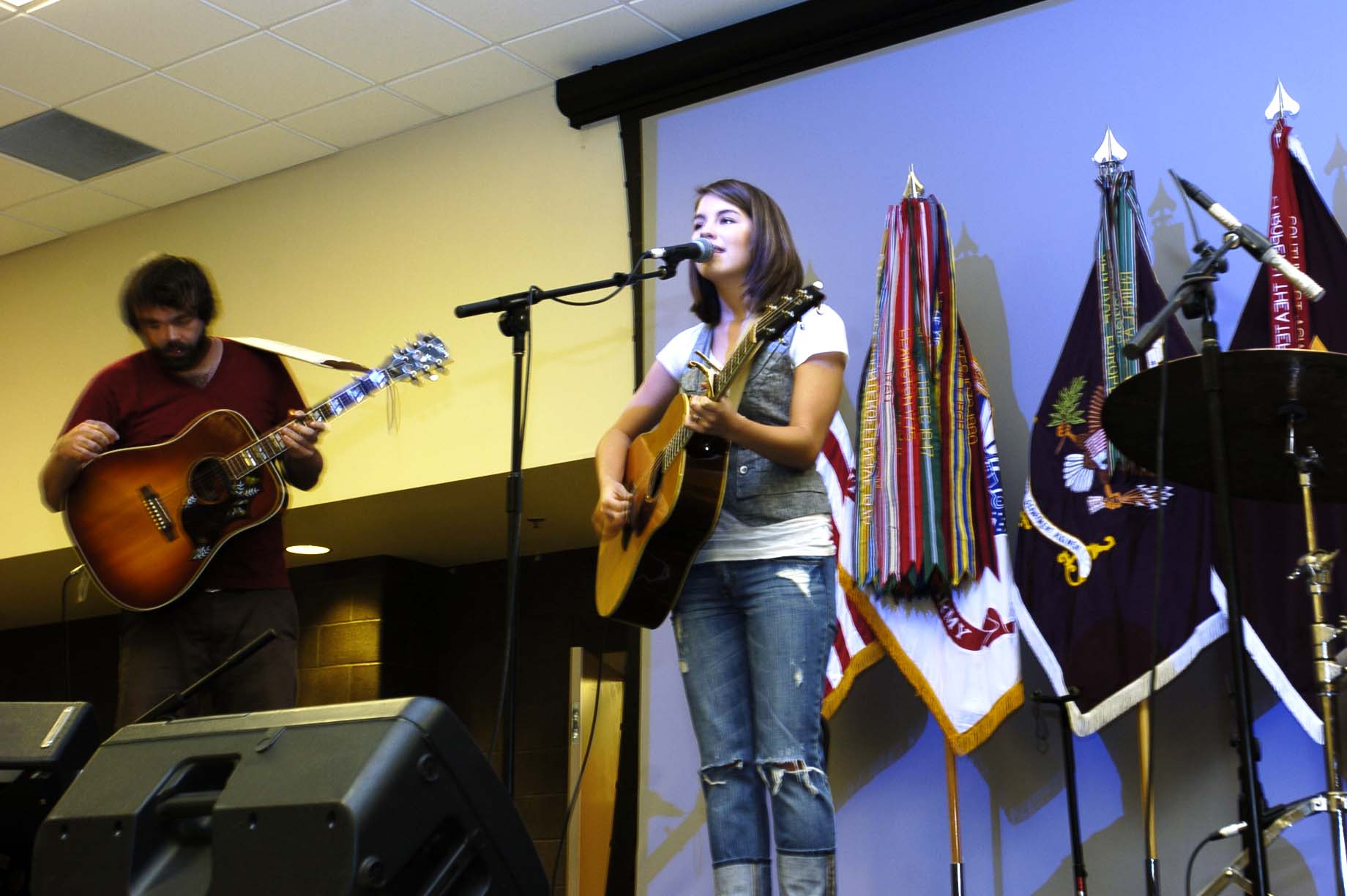
Dillon performs at a Patriot Day ceremony at Fort Gillem in 2009.

Dillon's musical career began at age 13 and she started recording her first album, Vulnerable, in 2001, that ended up in the hands of EMI executive Brad O'Donnell. Reporting from the time says that audiences connected with her first record almost immediately, and result being several hit singles, and multiple Dove nomination. As well, the album received critical acclaim, and "an exponentially increasing grassroots fan base that propelled her career forward in great leaps". Her self-titled debut album, released in 2004, was the highest selling female solo debut album for the year, and attracted GMA nominations for both Female Vocalist and New Artist of the Year. The radio single All I Need reached the number one position on the U.S. charts.

She released her second album, Imagination, in August 2005. The CD prompted CCM Magazine to label her as "the future of Christian music".

Dillon appears on the Music Inspired by The Chronicles of Narnia: The Lion, the Witch and the Wardrobe soundtrack of 2005, singing "Hero". One track from Imagination, entitled "Dreamer", is featured in the end credits for the 2005 film of the same name, starring Kurt Russell and Dakota Fanning). A music video was created for this song, using clips from the film.

GMA's 2005 Producer of the Year, Ed Cash, teamed up with Dillon to co-produce an 11-track album, all of which were written or co-written by Dillon; the result was her 2007 album, Waking Up released on April 3. As described by Dillon,

Waking Up is the most joyful record I’ve made... even though it revolves around themes of brokenness and this feeling of being really, really small in the presence of God. When the Lord is growing something in me, it feels like a lot of things are dying—because they really are. And when the Lord is making things soft and vulnerable in me, it's really painful. But even so, I think this is the freest sounding project I’ve created.

Joining Ed Cash in the co-production of Waking Up were Will Hunt and John Alagia (an associate of John Mayer and Dave Matthews Band). As CBN.com explains,

Influenced for years by penetrating and poetic writers like Rich Mullins, Keith Green, and Sara Groves, Bethany has tended to gravitate toward themes that require a measure of courage and open-heartedness to explore... Waking Up embraces big questions of suffering, barrenness, vulnerability, romance, and faithfulness. Like the writers Bethany has modeled herself after, she proves herself willing to live and create in that place of ambivalent tension that inevitably comes from refusing to settle for easy, feel-good answers. And yet, like the psalmist, Bethany has a penchant for finding the redemption in the midst of the pain.

Dillon's "When You Love Someone" appears as a track on the film soundtrack album, Music from and Inspired by Bridge to Terabithia. In late 2007, Dillon and Sanctus Real opened with Steven Curtis Chapman on his Live in the Moment Tour.

On March 29, 2008, Dillon wed Shane Barnard of Shane & Shane in Xenia, Ohio. In 2016, Dillon and Barnard released the song "Covenant", alongside a fundraising campaign to support a new, independent studio effort and recording to appear in 2017 under her new stage name, Bethany Barnard. On February 10, 2017, she independently released A Better Word.

== Discography ==
=== Albums ===
- Bethany Dillon (2004)
- Imagination (2005)
- Waking Up (2007)
- So Far: The Acoustic Sessions (2008)
- In Christ Alone: Modern Hymns of Worship (with Matt Hammitt) (2008)
- Stop & Listen (2009)
- A Better Word (2017)
- All My Questions (2021)

=== EPs ===
The Beautiful Sessions (released February 11, 2004)

Track listing:

1. "Beautiful"
2. "Move Forward"
3. "Beautiful (Acoustic)"
4. "Great Big Mystery (Acoustic)"
5. "For My Love (Acoustic)"
6. "Revolutionaries (Acoustic)"
Connect Sets (released December 13, 2005)

Track listing:

1. "All That I Can Do"
2. "Hallelujah"
3. "Beautiful"
Top Five Hits: Bethany Dillon (released December 5, 2006)

Track listing:

1. "All I Need"
2. "Beautiful"
3. "Hero"
4. "Dreamer"
5. "Hallelujah"
To Those Who Wait (released March 16, 2012)

Track listing:

1. "Satisfy (Tappety Intro)"
2. "Satisfy (live)"
3. "To Those Who Wait (live)"
4. "You're the Best Song (live)"
5. "You Did Not Have a Home (live)"

=== Singles ===
List of singles, with selected chart positions
Title	Year	Peak chart positions		Album
Title	Year	US Christian Songs	US AC	Album
"All I Need"	2004	4	—	Bethany Dillon
"Beautiful"	2004	7	—	Bethany Dillon
"Lead Me On"	2004	27	—	Bethany Dillon
"O Come, O Come Emmanuel" (digital only)	2004	14	—	—
"God Rest Ye Merry Gentlemen"	2005	—	—	WOW Christmas: Green
"All That I Can Do"	2005	24	—	Imagination
"Hallelujah"	2005	28	—	Imagination
"Dreamer"	2006	31	39	Imagination
"The Kingdom"	2007	—	—	Waking Up
"Let Your Light Shine"	2007	—	—	Waking Up
"When You Love Someone"	2007	28	—	Music from and Inspired by Bridge to Terabithia
"Everyone to Know"	2009	44	—	Stop & Listen

=== Contributions ===
- 2004 - Simply Great Music - "Great Big Mystery" (from Bethany Dillon)
- 2004 - WOW Hits 2005 - "All I Need" (from Bethany Dillon)
- 2005 - Every Young Woman's Battle - "Exodus (Faithful)" (from Bethany Dillon)
- 2005 - Music Inspired by The Chronicles of Narnia: The Lion, the Witch and the Wardrobe - "Hero"
- 2005 - WOW Hits 2006 - "All That I Can Do" (from Imagination)
- 2005 - WOW Christmas: Green - "God Rest Ye Merry Gentlemen"
- 2005 - Night of Joy 2005 - "Vagabond" (from Imagination)
- 2006 - Pursue Me - Jason Holdridge - "Word of Fire," "Psalm 29," "The Story"
- 2006 - Unexpected Gifts: 12 New Sounds of Christmas - "God Rest Ye Merry Gentlemen"
- 2006 - WOW Worship: Aqua - "Holy Is The Lord"
- 2006 - Sing Over Me: Worship Songs and Lullabies - "How Great Is Our God", "Sing Over Me" (with Nichole Nordeman), "Unwavering"
- 2007 - Music Inspired by the Motion Picture Amazing Grace - "All Creatures of Our God and King" (with Shawn McDonald)
- 2007 - Music from and Inspired by Bridge to Terabithia - "When You Love Someone" (from Waking Up)
- 2007 - WOW Hymns - "All Creatures of Our God And King" (with Shawn McDonald)
- 2007 - Worship Together Favorites - "Holy is the Lord"
- 2008 - The Daraja Children's Choir of Africa - "Everlasting God"
- 2009 - You'll Be Whole - Lindsey Kane - "It Is Well" duet with Lindsey Kane
- 2009 - Glory Revealed II: The Word of God in Worship - "Never" with Shawn Lewis
- 2011 - Lift Up the Light - Oaks Worship - "I Want Your Presence"
- 2011 - The Music of a Movement (Reach Records) - "You Alone" Tedashii ft. Bethany Dillon
- 2013 - War In the Waiting - Oaks Worship - "Amazing Grace"

== Awards ==
=== GMA Dove Awards ===
Year	Award	Result
2005	New Artist of the Year	Nominated
2005	Female Vocalist of the Year	Nominated
2005	Pop/Contemporary Album of the Year (Bethany Dillon)	Nominated
2006	Female Vocalist of the Year	Nominated
