= On a Rolling Ball =

Studio album by Gabe Dixon Band
- Released: 2002
- Label: Warner Bros
- Producer: David Kahne

Professional ratings
Review scores
Source	Rating
AllMusic	link

On a Rolling Ball is the first studio album by the rock band the Gabe Dixon Band. It was released in 2002 on Warner Bros. Records.

== Track listing ==
1. More Than It Would Seem
2. Corner Café
3. Bird Dancer
4. Everything's OK
5. Your Last Fool
6. Expiration Date
7. Love Story
8. Sitting at the Station
9. Just a Dream
10. One to the World
11. Now
12. Happy Woman
13. Come Around
14. Beauty of the Sea
