= In Christ Alone: Modern Hymns of Worship =

Studio album by Bethany Dillon and Matt Hammitt
- Released: March 11, 2008
- Studios: IHOF Studio (Nashville, Tennessee)
- Genres: Gospel, CCM, Christian rock
- Length: 50:04
- Label: Sparrow
- Producer: John Mark Painter

In Christ Alone: Modern Hymns Of Worship is a 2008 Christian worship album by Bethany Dillon and Matt Hammitt, lead singer of Sanctus Real released on Sparrow Records label.

== Track list ==
Official track listing
No.	Title	Writer(s)	Length
1.	"Clinging to the Cross"	Tim Hughes	4:34
2.	"In Christ Alone"	Keith Getty, Stuart Townend	4:44
3.	"Jesus Is Lord"	Getty, Townend	3:13
4.	"Joy Has Dawned"	Getty, Townend	4:03
5.	"O Church Arise"	Getty, Townend	5:11
6.	"God of Justice"	Hughes	4:24
7.	"On the Third Day"	Marc Byrd, Matt Maher	4:31
8.	"The Power of the Cross"	Getty, Townend	4:24
9.	"Adoration"	Maher	3:58
10.	"How Deep the Father's Love for Us"	Townend	3:12
11.	"In the Cross Alone I Glory"	Brian Petak	3:52
12.	"The Wonder of the Cross"	Vicky Beeching	3:59

== Personnel ==
- Bethany Dillon – vocals
- Matt Hammitt – vocals
- Blair Masters – acoustic piano
- John Mark Painter – keyboards, guitars, bass, percussion, horns, arrangements
- Dale Oliver – guitars
- Jason Pantana – guitars
- Bobby Huff – drums
- Sam Levine – flute
- Anthony LaMarchina – cello
- Kristin Wilkinson – viola
- David Angell – violin
- David Davidson – violin
- Lisa Bevill – backing vocals
- Mark Ivey – backing vocals
- Fleming McWilliams – backing vocals
- Stephanie Wedan – backing vocals

=== Production ===
- Christopher York – A&R
- John Mark Painter – producer, engineer
- Jim DeMain – mastering at Yes Master (Nashville, Tennessee)
- Jess Chambers – A&R administration
- Jan Cook – creative director
- Katie Moore – art direction, design, illustrations
