= Dave Barnes =

American singer-songwriter

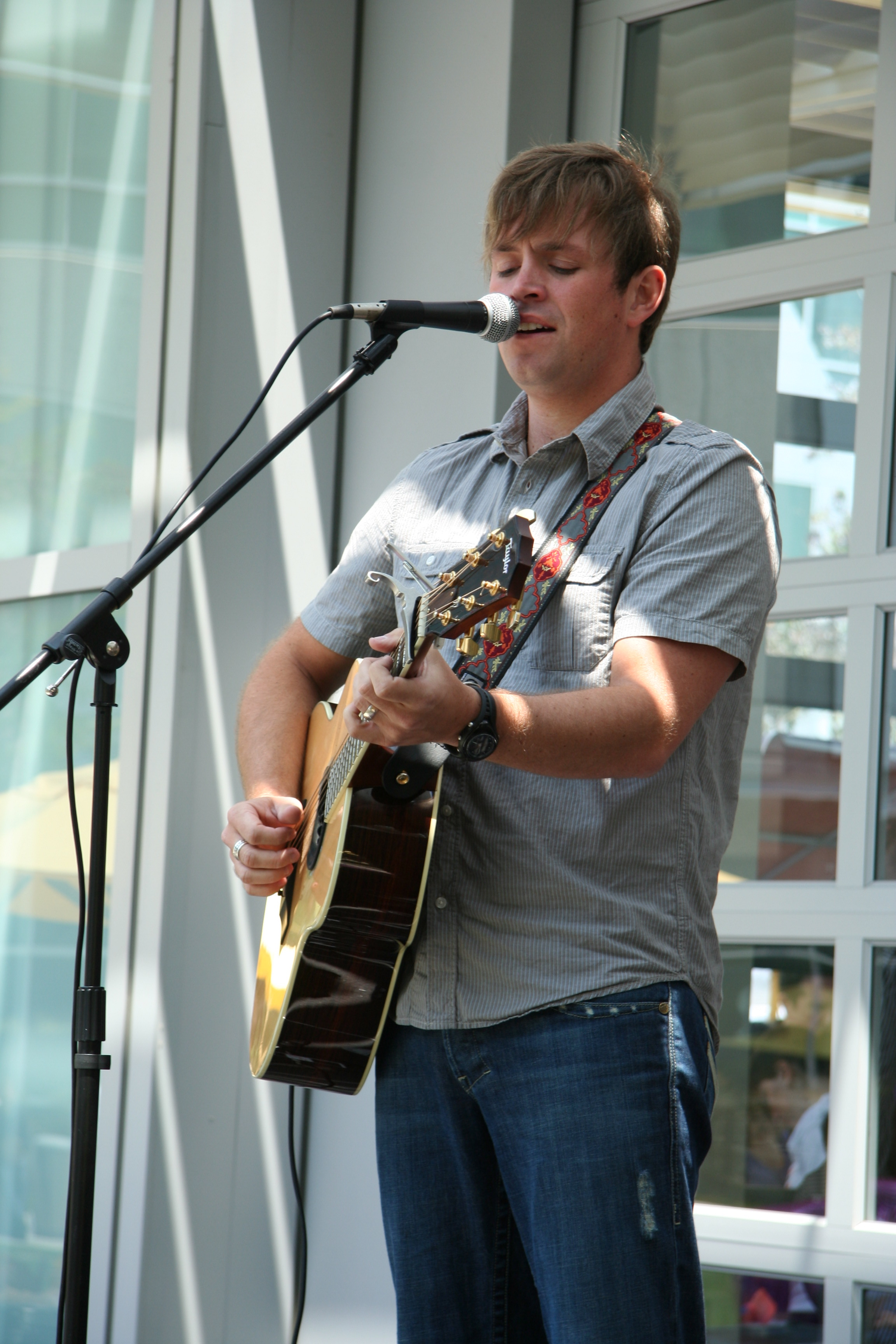

Background information
- Born: David Mckee Barnes; June 20, 1978 (age 48); South Carolina, U.S.
- Origin: Knoxville, Tennessee, U.S.
- Genres: Rock; acoustic; blue-eyed soul; contemporary Christian; pop
- Occupations: Musician, singer, songwriter
- Instruments: Guitar, vocals
- Years active: 2001–present
- Labels: Razor & Tie, Ripley Recordings, 50 Year Plan Records
- Spouse: Annie Barnes
- Website: www.davebarnes.com

David Mckee Barnes (born June 20, 1978) is an American musician, singer, and songwriter from Nashville, Tennessee. He has released eight studio albums, including two Christmas albums. His most recent full-length album, Featherbrained Wealth Motel, was released in 2023.

== Early life ==
The eldest of three children, Barnes was born in South Carolina in 1978, the son of a pastor who relocated his family to Kosciusko, Mississippi when Barnes was six years old. The Barnes family then moved to Knoxville, Tennessee the summer during his junior year of high school, where he graduated from Farragut High School in 1996. Barnes went to college at Middle Tennessee State University and graduated with a degree in Recording Industry Management. While there, he began playing guitar and writing songs for fun. He was initially only interested in writing material for other performers but was later encouraged by his peers to perform his works himself. Barnes took their advice and began performing within the campus, and then performed at various nearby universities in regional centers as well as his own.

== Musical career ==
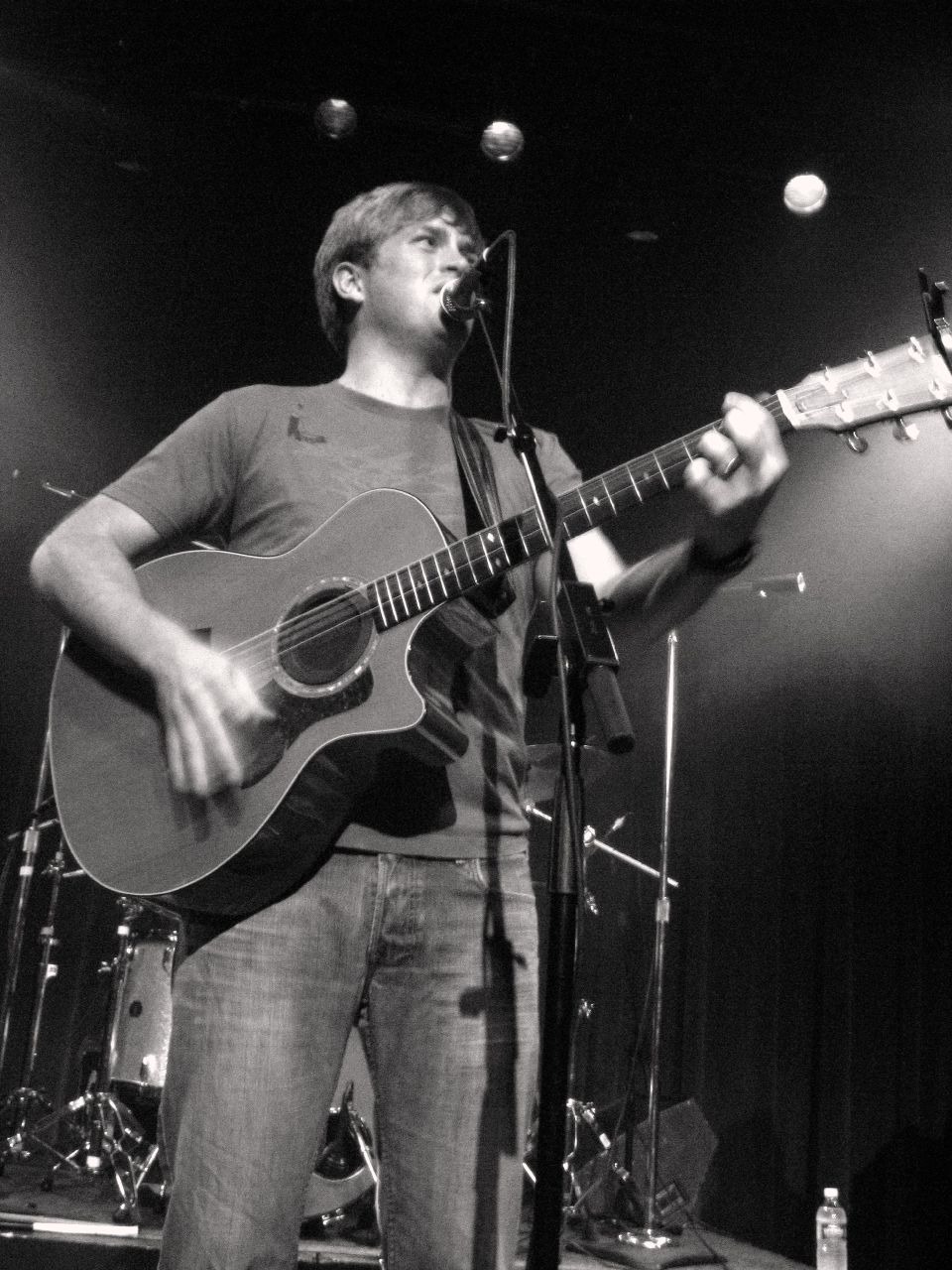
Barnes performing in Birmingham, Alabama in 2006.

Barnes released a 10-track demo album, "little fist big hurt," around 2000. After graduating from Middle Tennessee State University, he began touring and in 2002 released his five-song EP Three, Then Four, as purely a guitar-and-vocals release. With this release and the touring performed around it, Barnes' fan following expanded, with the assistance of internet promotion. Barnes toured heavily for over a year after that. During this period, Barnes met Ed Cash, a record producer who had worked with Bebo Norman, who Barnes had previously met in 1998 at Windy Gap, a Young Life camp in North Carolina.

At the suggestion of Cash, Barnes recorded a full-band studio LP. Barnes released Brother, Bring The Sun in September 2004. This album was critically acclaimed for Barnes' songwriting and overall high-quality presentation for an independent release. Also through its release, Barnes gained notability among singers Amy Grant (who later performed on Barnes' wedding song "I Have and I Always Will"), Vince Gill, and John Mayer. In 2005, Barnes co-produced the five-song EP Today & Tomorrow for his friend Matt Wertz. Barnes also contributed his songwriting to one of its songs.

In 2006, Barnes released his second full band studio album Chasing Mississippi. In mid-to-late 2006, Barnes toured with Matt Wertz with songs from both albums and some newly written material as well. In early 2007 Barnes began experimenting with stand-up comedy and, with support from friends, put together a routine which he performed in Nashville, Tennessee.

In June 2007, Barnes re-entered the studio to record his third album. In April 2008, having signed to the record label Razor and Tie, he released his major-label debut, Me and You and the World. In promotion of the album, the song "Until You", which was previously on Brother, Bring the Sun, was re-recorded and released as a single on February 19, 2008.

In late 2008, Barnes was one of the opening acts for the shows from Orlando through Chicago on Hanson's "The Walk Around the World Tour".

Barnes' songs were also featured on the show What I Like About You, including his song "On a Night Like This", which was featured on the "Three Little Words" episode. They were sung by the main character's, Holly's, English boyfriend named Ben, and are usually serenades.

On February 3, 2009, Barnes released a Valentine's Day EP titled You, the Night, and Candlelight.

In April 2010, Barnes released his fourth full band studio album What We Want, What We Get after having released his single "God Gave Me You" from the same album. The single rose into the top-five Contemporary Christian music chart by June. Barnes appeared on the U.S. soap opera All My Children as himself and performed the song on June 10, 2010.

Blake Shelton released Barnes' song "God Gave Me You" as his second single on his album Red River Blue in fall of 2011. It became Blake's fifth number one song on country radio and has sold over one million units. In 2012, Dave Barnes was nominated for a Grammy Award for Best Country Song for writing the song "God Gave Me You". In an interview with American Songwriter, Dave stated that "I honestly didn't know I could write songs that could be that universal. Songs that could be that successful. I think one of the things about that song, as I have looked back on it and sort of examined under the hood, is that the sentiment is pretty universal... The beauty of "God Gave Me You" was that I finally saw what I had done and it opened this really cool door to me being more conscious about writing songs that appeal to more people, and this new record Stories to Tell really showcases that." Stories to Tell, Dave's fifth full studio album, was released on March 13, 2012.

Dave Barnes' second Christmas collection, A December to Remember, was released on October 29, 2013. It is the follow-up to his successful 2010 holiday project Very Merry Christmas. Barnes co-produced A December to Remember, which features six originals, four written and two co-written, such as "So, Santa" and "Better Than Christmas Day". The 11-song line-up also includes five Christmas classics, from "White Christmas" to "It's the Most Wonderful Time of the Year".

On January 28, 2014, he released Golden Days with the album's first single, "Good".

Barnes released a second Valentine's Day EP on February 10, 2015, consisting of six acoustic songs and titled Hymns for Her.

He released his seventh full-length album, Carry On, San Vincente, in 2016.

In 2018 he released the album Who Knew It Would Be So Hard To Be Myself.

In 2020 he released his new album Dreaming in Electric Blue.

== Songwriting ==
As a songwriter, Barnes has both written and co-written songs with Joey Humke for Carrie Underwood, Thomas Rhett and Maren Morris, Reba McEntire, Blake Shelton, Hunter Hayes, Marc Broussard, Bebo Norman, Matt Wertz, Andrew Ripp, Billy Currington, Tim McGraw, Danielle Bradbery, Francesca Battistelli, Bethany Dillon, Lady A, Maddie & Tae, and Ingrid Michaelson.

=== Written and co-written songs ===
Year	Artist	Album	Song	Co-written with
2004	Bethany Dillon	Bethany Dillon	"All I Need"	Bethany Dillon, Ed Cash
2004	Marc Broussard	Carencro	"Lonely Night in Georgia"	Marc Broussard, Martin Sexton
2004	Marc Broussard	Carencro	"Gavin's Song"	Marc Broussard
2005	Bethany Dillon	Imagination	"All That I Can Do"	Bethany Dillon, Ed Cash
2006	Bebo Norman	Between the Dreaming and the Coming True	"The Way We Mend"	Bebo Norman
2010	Billy Currington	Enjoy Yourself	"Until You"	
2011	Blake Shelton	Red River Blue	"God Gave Me You"	
2011	Francesca Battistelli	Hundred More Years	"Emily (It's Love)" (featuring Dave Barnes)	Francesca Battistelli
2011	Matt Wertz	Weights & Wings	"Someone Like You"	Matt Wertz
2013	Danielle Bradbery	Danielle Bradbery	"Daughter of a Workin' Man"	Nicolle Galyon, Clint Lagerberg
2013	Andrew Ripp	Won't Let Go	"Someone to Love You"	Andrew Ripp
2015	Hunter Hayes	The 21 Project	"Young and in Love"	Hunter Hayes
2017	Thomas Rhett	Life Changes	"Craving You" (featuring Maren Morris)	Julian Bunetta
2017	Thomas Rhett	Life Changes	"Kiss Me Like a Stranger"	Thomas Rhett, Jordan Reynolds
2018	Carrie Underwood	Cry Pretty	"Kingdom"	Carrie Underwood, Chris DeStefano
2019	Lady A	Ocean	"Be Patient with My Love"	Charles Kelley, Ben West
2019	Lady A	Ocean	"On a Night Like This"	
2020	Maddie & Tae	The Way It Feels	"My Man"	Taylor Dye, Maddie Marlow, Jordan Reynolds
2020	Maddie & Tae	The Way It Feels	"Ain’t There Yet"	Taylor Dye, Maddie Marlow, Ben West
2020	Maddie & Tae	The Way It Feels	"Lay Here with Me" (featuring Dierks Bentley)	Taylor Dye, Maddie Marlow, Josh Kerr
2021	Lady A	What a Song Can Do	"Like a Lady"	Hillary Scott, Michelle Buzz, Martin Johnson, Brandon Paddock
2021	Ingrid Michaelson	Songs for the Season	"Christmas Valentine" (featuring Jason Mraz)	Ingrid Michaelson, Jason Mraz
2021	Ingrid Michaelson	Songs for the Season	"Merry Christmas, Happy New Year" (featuring Zooey Deschanel)	Ingrid Michaelson, Zooey Deschanel

== Personal life ==
Barnes and his wife, Annie, have three children - Ben, Suzanna, and Sam.

== Discography ==
=== Studio albums ===
Title	Details	Peak chart positions		
Title	Details	US	US Christ	US Rock
little fist big hurt	Release date: ~2000; Label: independent release; Formats: CD	—	—	—
Brother, Bring the Sun	Release date: September 21, 2004; Label: No Gang Music; Formats: CD, music download	—	—	—
Chasing Mississippi	Release date: March 21, 2006; Label: No Gang Music; Formats: CD, music download	—	—	—
Me and You and the World	Release date: April 1, 2008; Label: Razor & Tie; Formats: CD, music download	94	—	—
What We Want, What We Get	Release date: April 6, 2010; Label: Razor & Tie; Formats: CD, music download	59	3	17
Stories to Tell	Release date: March 13, 2012; Label: Razor & Tie; Formats: CD, music download	59	3	—
Golden Days	Release date: January 28, 2014; Label: 50 Year Plan Records; Formats: CD, music download	169	9	—
Carry On, San Vicente	Release date: March 18, 2016; Label: 50 Year Plan Records; Formats: CD, music download, LP	—	—	–
Who Knew It Would Be So Hard To Be Myself	Release date: February 9, 2018; Label: 50 Year Plan Records; Formats: CD, music download, LP	—	—	—
Dreaming in Electric Blue	Release date: April 3, 2020; Label: 50 Year Plan Records; Formats: CD, music download, LP	—	—	—
Notes from Paris	Release date: September 10, 2021; Label: 50 Year Plan Records; Formats: Music download	—	—	—
Featherbrained Wealth Motel	Release date: October 20, 2023; Label: 50 Year Plan Records; Formats: Music download, LP	—	—	—
"—" denotes releases that did not chart

=== Extended plays ===
Title	Details	Peak chart positions		
Title	Details	US	US Christ	US Rock
Three, Then Four	Release date: January 12, 2002; Label: No Gang Music; Formats: CD, music download	—	—	—
You, the Night, and Candlelight	Release date: February 9, 2009; Label: Razor & Tie; Formats: CD, music download	158	—	—
Hymns for Her	Release date: February 10, 2015; Label: 50 Year Plan Records; Formats: CD, music download	—	12	—
Who Knew (Vol. 1)	Release date: December 12, 2017; Label: 50 Year Plan Records; Format: Music download	—	—	—
Who Knew It Would Be So Hard (Vol. 2)	Release date: January 12, 2018; Label: 50 Year Plan Records; Format: Music download	—	—	—
"—" denotes releases that did not chart

=== Compilations ===
Title	Details	Peak chart positions		
Title	Details	US	US Christ	US Rock
Remembering: Greatest Hits Acoustic	Release date: August 12, 2022; Label: 50 Year Plan Records; Formats: Music download, LP	—	—	—
"—" denotes releases that did not chart

=== Christmas albums ===
Title	Details	Peak chart positions			
Title	Details	US	US Christ	US Holiday	US Rock
Very Merry Christmas	Release date: November 9, 2010; Label: Razor & Tie; Formats: CD, music download	80	6	13	15
A December to Remember	Release date: October 29, 2013; Label: 50 Year Plan Records; Formats: CD, music download	—	18	22	—

=== Christmas extended plays ===
Title	Details	Peak chart positions			
Title	Details	US	US Christ	US Holiday	US Rock
I Wish It Would Snow	Release date: November 19, 2021; Label: 50 Year Plan Records; Format: Music download, LP	—	—	—	—
"—" denotes releases that did not chart

=== Singles ===
Year	Single	Peak chart positions		Album
Year	Single	US AC	US Christ	Album
2004	"Crazyboutya"	—	—	Brother, Bring the Sun
2004	"Grace's Amazing Hands"	—	—	Brother, Bring the Sun
2006	"Miles to Go"	—	—	Chasing Mississippi
2006	"Everybody But You"	—	—	Chasing Mississippi
2008	"Until You"	—	—	Me and You and the World
2008	"Brothers & Sisters"	—	—	Me and You and the World
2008	"Good World Gone Bad"	—	—	Me and You and the World
2009	"Nothing Else"	—	—	Me and You and the World
2009	"Since You Said I Do"	—	—	Me and You and the World
2009	"Loving You, Loving Me"	—	—	You, the Night & Candlelight
2010	"God Gave Me You"	21	13	What We Want, What We Get
2010	"Little Lies"	—	—	What We Want, What We Get
2010	"Look So Easy"	—	—	What We Want, What We Get
2010	"Family Tree"	—	25	Very Merry Christmas
2010	"I Pray on Christmas"	—	37	Very Merry Christmas
2010	"Christmas Tonight" (featuring Hillary Scott)	9	—	Very Merry Christmas
2011	"The Christmas Song"	—	45	Very Merry Christmas
2011	"What I Need" (featuring Jonny Lang)	—	40	What We Want, What We Get
2012	"Hey Now"	—	—	non-album single
2012	"White Flag"	—	—	Stories To Tell
2012	"Love Will Be Enough For Us"	—	—	Stories To Tell
2013	"Good"	—	50	Golden Days
2014	"Somehow Saving You"	—	—	non-album single
2020	"Dreaming in Electric Blue"	—	—	Dreaming in Electric Blue
2020	"Sorry's So Hard To Say (Remix)" (featuring The Shadowboxers)	—	—	Dreaming in Electric Blue (Reimagined)
2020	"Love Somebody (Josh Kerr Remix)"	—	—	Dreaming in Electric Blue (Reimagined)
2020	"Sing Me Home"	—	—	Notes from Paris
2020	"We're Gonna Miss These Days"	—	—	Notes from Paris
2020	"You to Me"	—	—	I Wish It Would Snow
2020	"Go Tell it on the Mountain"	—	—	I Wish It Would Snow
2021	"My Love Will Follow You"	—	—	Notes from Paris
2021	"Only Good Will Come of This"	—	—	Notes from Paris
2021	"Everytime She Falls in Love"	—	—	Notes from Paris
2021	"The Lord Ain't Let Me Down Lately"	—	—	Notes from Paris
2021	"June" (featuring Suzy Jones)	—	—	Notes from Paris
2021	"Christmas Back Home"	—	—	I Wish It Would Snow
2023	"Sunshine"	—	—	Featherbrained Wealth Motel
2023	"Hayley With a Heart"	—	—	Featherbrained Wealth Motel
2023	"Yearslong"	—	—	Featherbrained Wealth Motel
2024	"Better Woman"	—	—	Featherbrained Wealth Motel (Deluxe)
2025	"Some People's Kids"	—	—	non-album single
2025	"Symphony"	—	—	non-album single
"—" denotes releases that did not chart

== Awards and nominations ==
CMA Awards

Year	Nominee / work	Award	Result
2012	"God Gave Me You"	Song of the Year	Nominated

Dove Awards

Year	Nominee / work	Award	Result
2018	"Washed By the Water"	Southern Gospel Recorded Song of the Year	Won

Grammy Awards

Year	Nominee / work	Award	Result
2012	"God Gave Me You"	Best Country Song	Nominated
