= The Gabe Dixon Band =

Three-piece band formed at the University of Miami

- Origin: United States
- Genres: Rock
- Years active: 1998–2010
- Past members: Gabe Dixon; Jano Rix; Chandler Webber

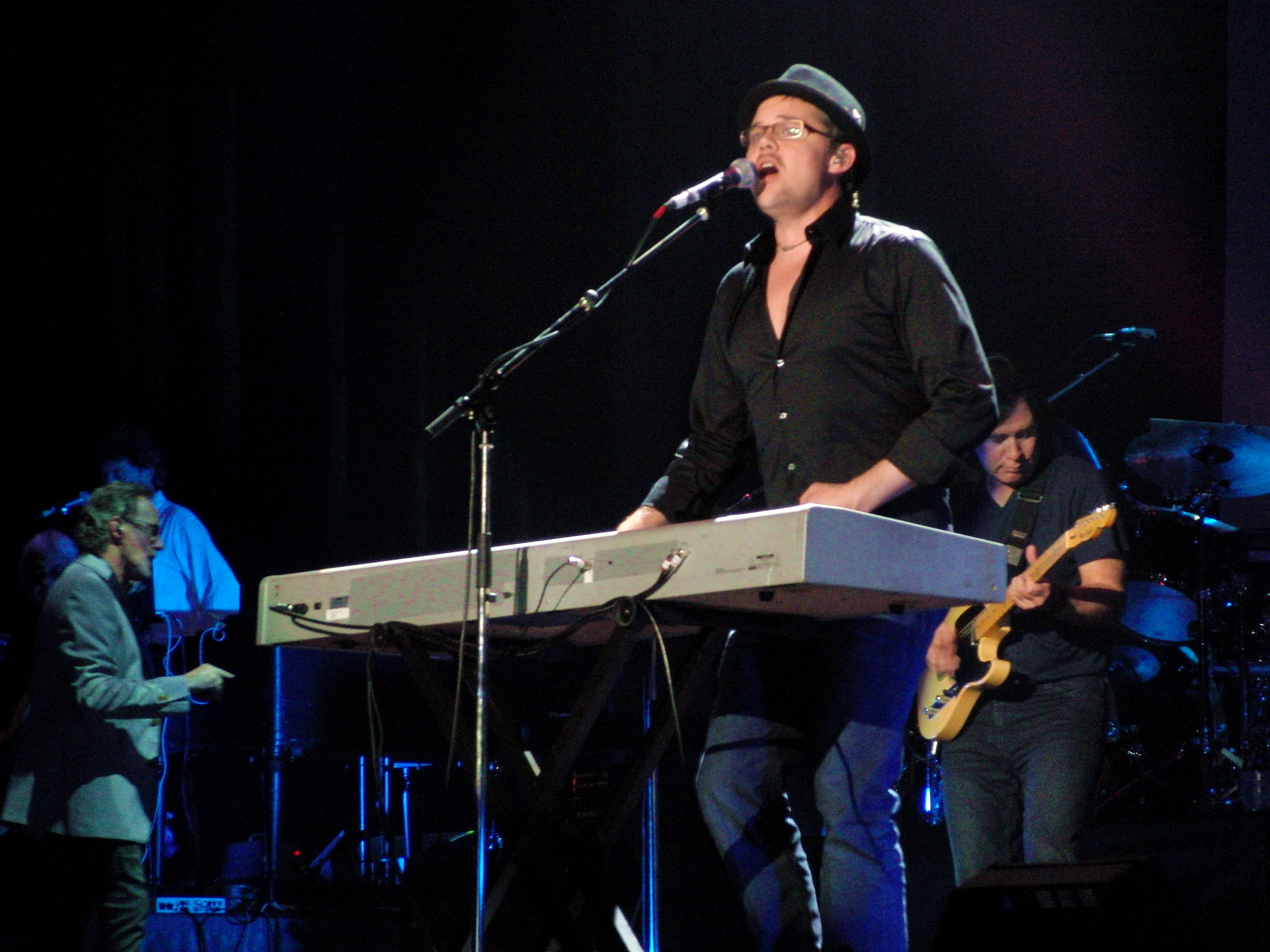
Gabe Dixon during a Supertramp concert at Madrid in 2010.

The Gabe Dixon Band were a three-piece band that was formed in the fall of 1998 at the University of Miami. The band played piano-driven rock and was named after Gabe Dixon, the lead vocalist and pianist of the band. After the band broke up in 2010, Dixon has continued as a solo artist.

== Members ==
- Gabe Dixon – vocals, keyboards, melodica (1998-2010)
- Jano Rix – drums (1998-2010)
- Winston Harrison – bass guitar (1998–2009)
- Chandler Webber - saxophone (1998–2004)
- Chris Young - guitar (1998)

== Career ==
In 1999, the band worked with producer/engineer Eddie Kramer to independently release their debut album, More Than It Would Seem. Upon graduation from the University of Miami, they relocated to New York City and were signed to Reprise by David Kahne. They released their major label debut, On a Rolling Ball, in 2002. Three years later, they released the Live at World Cafe EP, which featured the song "All Will Be Well," which was featured in promos for the NBC show Conviction.

Prior to the release of On a Rolling Ball, Dixon played keyboards and sang backing vocals on Paul McCartney's 2001 album, "Driving Rain." Dixon also performed live with McCartney at the Concert for New York City, a September 11 fundraiser. McCartney offered Dixon the opportunity to join his world tour, but Dixon declined the position to focus on the production of On a Rolling Ball.

The band played piano-driven rock akin to Ben Folds Five, albeit with a more serious tone. Billy Joel, Jackson Browne and early Elton John influenced the band's stylized vocal and piano rhythms.

Following the Live at World Cafe EP, the band signed with Fantasy Records and released The Gabe Dixon Band, in August 2008. In its initial days of release, it received praise from the music press and fellow artists. The band toured the United States from Aug 2008 through Nov 2008 with native New Yorker turned Canadian resident, newcomer Justin Nozuka.

Several tracks from the album received moderate media attention. "Find My Way" was the opening track to the film The Proposal (2009) starring Sandra Bullock and Ryan Reynolds. "All Will Be Well" was featured in the Parks and Recreation episode "End of the World". "Till You're Gone" was used in Bose store displays.

== Solo projects ==
As of 2010, Gabe Dixon is a solo artist. He released his first solo album, One Spark, on August 23, 2011 on Concord Bicycle Music. The album is produced by Marshall Altman and features a duet with Alison Krauss entitled "Even the Rain." Madi Diaz and James Walsh also lend their voices to the songs "Burn for You" and "I Can See You Shine" respectively.

On April 8, 2016, Dixon released his sophomore solo album, Turns to Gold on his own label, Rolling Ball Records. The album is produced by Paul Moak and features a duet with Natalie Prass entitled "The Way to Love Me".

== Discography ==
=== As a Band ===
- More Than It Would Seem (1999)
  - Included former band member Chandler Webber on saxophone
- On a Rolling Ball (2002)
  - Included former band member Chandler Webber on saxophone
  - Produced by David Kahne
- Live at World Cafe (2005)
  - Mixed by Dan Wilson (ex-Semisonic lead singer/songwriter)
- The Gabe Dixon Band (2008)
  - Produced by Neal Cappellino & The Gabe Dixon Band

=== Gabe Dixon Solo Discography ===
- One Spark (2011)
  - Produced by Marshall Altman
- Turns To Gold (2016)
  - Produced by Paul Moak
  - Includes former band member Jano Rix on drums
