= Brother, Bring the Sun =

Studio album by Dave Barnes
- Released: September 21, 2004
- Recorded: 2004
- Studio: Ed's (Franklin, Tennessee)
- Genre: Alternative rock; Indie rock; CCM; Singer-songwriter; Blues; R&B; Acoustic
- Length: 38:41
- Label: No Gang Music
- Producer: Ed Cash

Dave Barnes chronology
| Three, Then Four (2002) | Brother, Bring the Sun (2004) | Chasing Mississippi (2006) |

Brother, Bring the Sun is the first studio album released by singer-songwriter Dave Barnes. It was produced by Ed Cash.

== Track listing ==
All tracks are written by Dave Barnes, except where noted.

| No. | Title | Writer(s) | Length |
|---|---|---|---|
| 1. | "Crazyboutya" | | 3:43 |
| 2. | "Until You" | | 4:05 |
| 3. | "Graces Amazing Hands" | | 3:46 |
| 4. | "Can't Grow Tired of Your Love" | Dave Barnes; Ed Cash | 3:21 |
| 5. | "The L.A. Song" | | 3:59 |
| 6. | "Prayers of the Saints" | | 5:21 |
| 7. | "Your Love Will Never Change" | | 2:28 |
| 8. | "What Am I Gonna Do" | | 3:12 |
| 9. | "Nothing Fancy" | | 2:48 |
| 10. | "The Inbetween" | | 4:03 |
| 11. | "On a Night Like This" | | 1:59 |
| Total length: | | | 38:41 |

== Personnel ==
Performance

- Dave Barnes – vocals, backing vocals, acoustic guitars, drums
- Ben Shive – acoustic piano, Fender Rhodes, Wurlitzer electric piano, electric guitars, acoustic guitars
- Ed Cash – organ, electric guitars, acoustic guitars, classical guitar, kazoo, backing vocals
- Chris Kent – bass
- Matt Pierson – bass
- Jackie Street – bass
- Calvin Turner – bass, backing vocals
- Dan Needham – drums
- Scott Williamson – drums
- Juselemal "Jackpot" Jenkins – octave trumpet
- Anthony LaMarchina – cello

Production

- Ed Cash – producer, engineer, mixing
- Richard Dodd – mastering
- Jeremy Cowart – art direction, design, photography
- Darci Stebbins – photography assistant
- Amy Jo Young – photography assistant
- Dave Barnes – drawing, handwriting
