= Gabe Dixon =

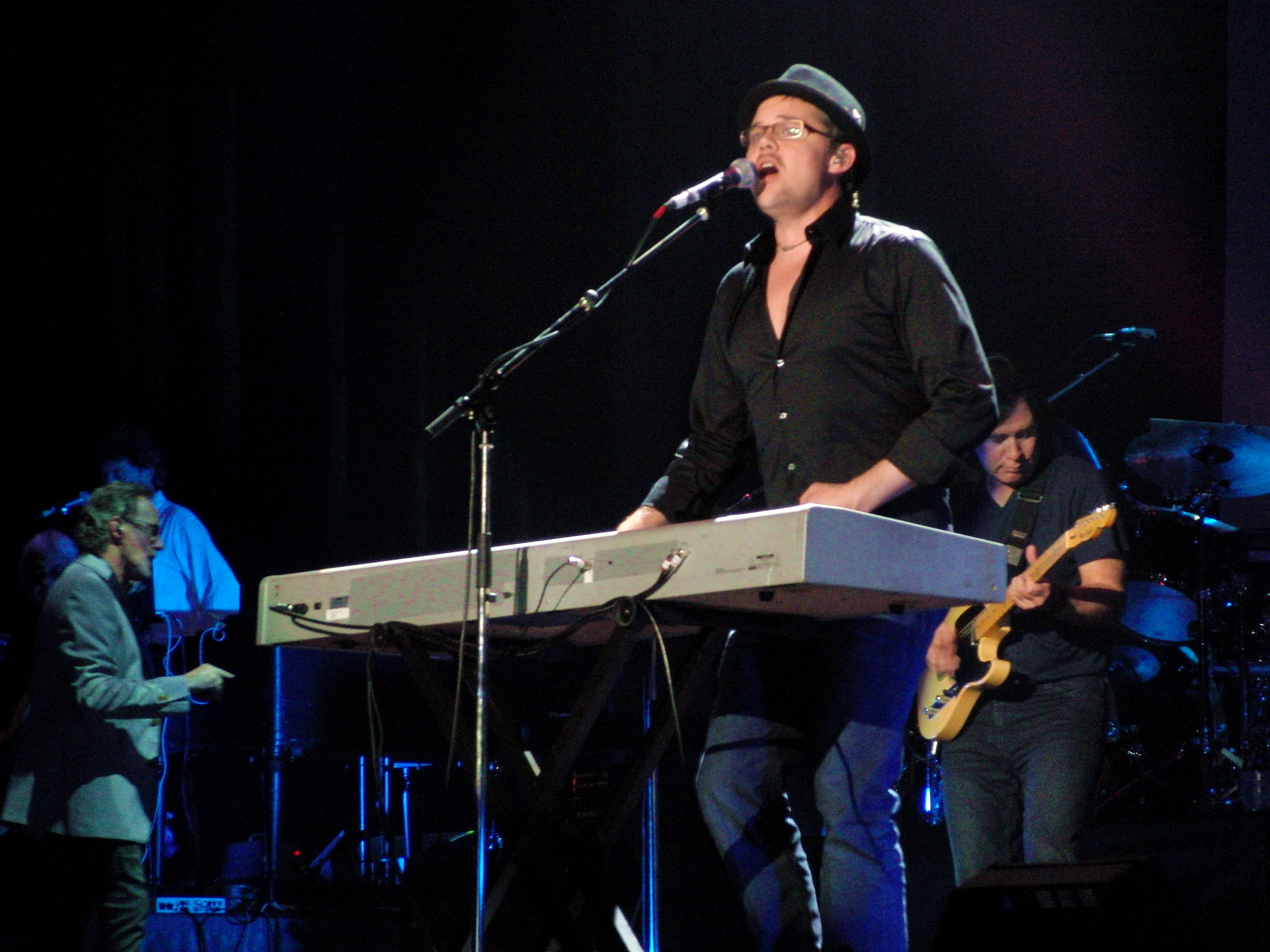
- Gabe Dixon during a Supertramp concert at Madrid in 2010.

Background information
- Born: December 7, 1977 (age 48); Shelbyville, Tennessee, U.S.
- Genre: Rock
- Years active: 1998-present
- Label: Rolling Ball Records
- Member of: Tedeschi Trucks Band
- Website: www.gabedixon.com

Gabe Dixon (born December 7, 1977) is an American musician. He began his career in the Nashville-based country band Six Shooter. Between 1998 and 2010, he was the lead singer of The Gabe Dixon Band. Since the band's break-up, Dixon has worked as a prolific solo artist. He tours the country regularly and has released four studio albums, One Spark (2011) and Turns to Gold (2016), "Lay It On Me" (2021), "Parts I've Played" (2026), and a live album, Live In Boston (2017). He is also the founder of the label Rolling Ball Records.

In 2019, Gabe joined the Tedeschi Trucks Band as a full-time keyboardist and vocalist contributing significantly to the writing and recording of their last two studio albums, I Am The Moon and Future Soul.

== Career ==
=== Beginnings and The Gabe Dixon Band ===
Gabe Dixon started early studying piano influenced by Billy Joel and Elton John. While studying at University of Miami, in 1998, he formed the four-piece band The Gabe Dixon Band alongside drummer Jano Rix, bassist Winston Harrison and alto saxophonist Chandler Webber. He worked with producer/engineer Eddie Kramer to independently release their debut album, More Than It Would Seem. Upon graduation from the University of Miami, the band relocated to New York City and were signed to Reprise by David Kahne.

Dixon played keyboards and sang backing vocals on Paul McCartney's 2001 album, Driving Rain. Dixon also performed live with McCartney at the Concert For New York City, a September 11 fundraiser. McCartney offered Dixon the opportunity to join his world tour, but Dixon declined citing his plans for a new album. Dixon played keyboards and kalimba with Loggins & Messina on their Live: Sittin' In Again at the Santa Barbara Bowl concert which was recorded and released on CD and DVD in 2005.

The band released their major label debut, On a Rolling Ball in 2002. Three years later, they released the Live at World Cafe EP, which featured the song "All Will Be Well" which was featured in promos for the NBC show Conviction.

Following the Live at World Cafe EP, the band signed with Fantasy Records and released The Gabe Dixon Band in August 2008. The band toured the United States in 2008. "Find My Way" was the opening track to the film The Proposal in 2009. The band discontinued in 2010 with Gabe Dixon deciding to go solo.

=== Solo career ===
Dixon released his first solo album, One Spark, on August 23, 2011 on Concord Bicycle Music. The album is produced by Marshall Altman and features a duet with Alison Krauss entitled "Even the Rain." Madi Diaz and James Walsh also lend their voices to the songs "Burn for You" and "I Can See You Shine," respectively. He also founded his own record label, Rolling Ball Records.

On April 8, 2016, Dixon released his second solo album, Turns to Gold, on his own label, Rolling Ball Records. The album is produced by Paul Moak and features a duet with Natalie Prass entitled "The Way To Love Me."

In the past, Gabe would play primarily grand piano. However, on "Turns to Gold," he performed all but one song on an upright piano. This choice conveyed a different energy. He and the musicians, including Jano Rix on drums (The Gabe Dixon Band, The Wood Brothers), Viktor Krauss on bass (Lyle Lovett), and Kris Donegan on guitar (Cam), cut everything to analog tape with no click track. The album also features vocal performances by Jason Eskridge, Garrison Starr and Boots Ottestad. Mastering was done by Brad Blackwood at Euphonics Mastering.

=== Appearances and popular culture ===
Gabe's song, "Find My Way," was the opening track to the film The Proposal, starring Sandra Bullock and Ryan Reynolds. "All Will Be Well" was featured in the fourth season of the television show Parks and Recreation. And "Till You're Gone" was used in Bose store displays.

Gabe has performed twice on Jimmy Kimmel Live!, as well as The Late Late Show with Craig Ferguson.

Throughout his career, many other notable artists have taken note of and supported Gabe's talent. He's held side gigs as the keyboardist and vocalist for Paul McCartney, Alison Krauss & Union Station, O.A.R. and Supertramp.

== Discography ==
Solo albums

- 2011: One Spark (produced by Marshall Altman, released on Concord Bicycle Music
- 2016: Turns to Gold (produced by Paul Moak, released by Rolling Ball Records)
- 2017: Live in Boston (released by BirnCORE)
- 2021: Lay It On Me

As part of The Gabe Dixon Band

- 1999: More Than It Would Seem
- 2002: On a Rolling Ball
- 2005: Live at World Cafe
- 2008: The Gabe Dixon Band

As part of Tedeschi Trucks Band

- 2022: I Am the Moon
- 2026: Future Soul
