= Matt Wertz =

American singer-songwriter (born 1979)

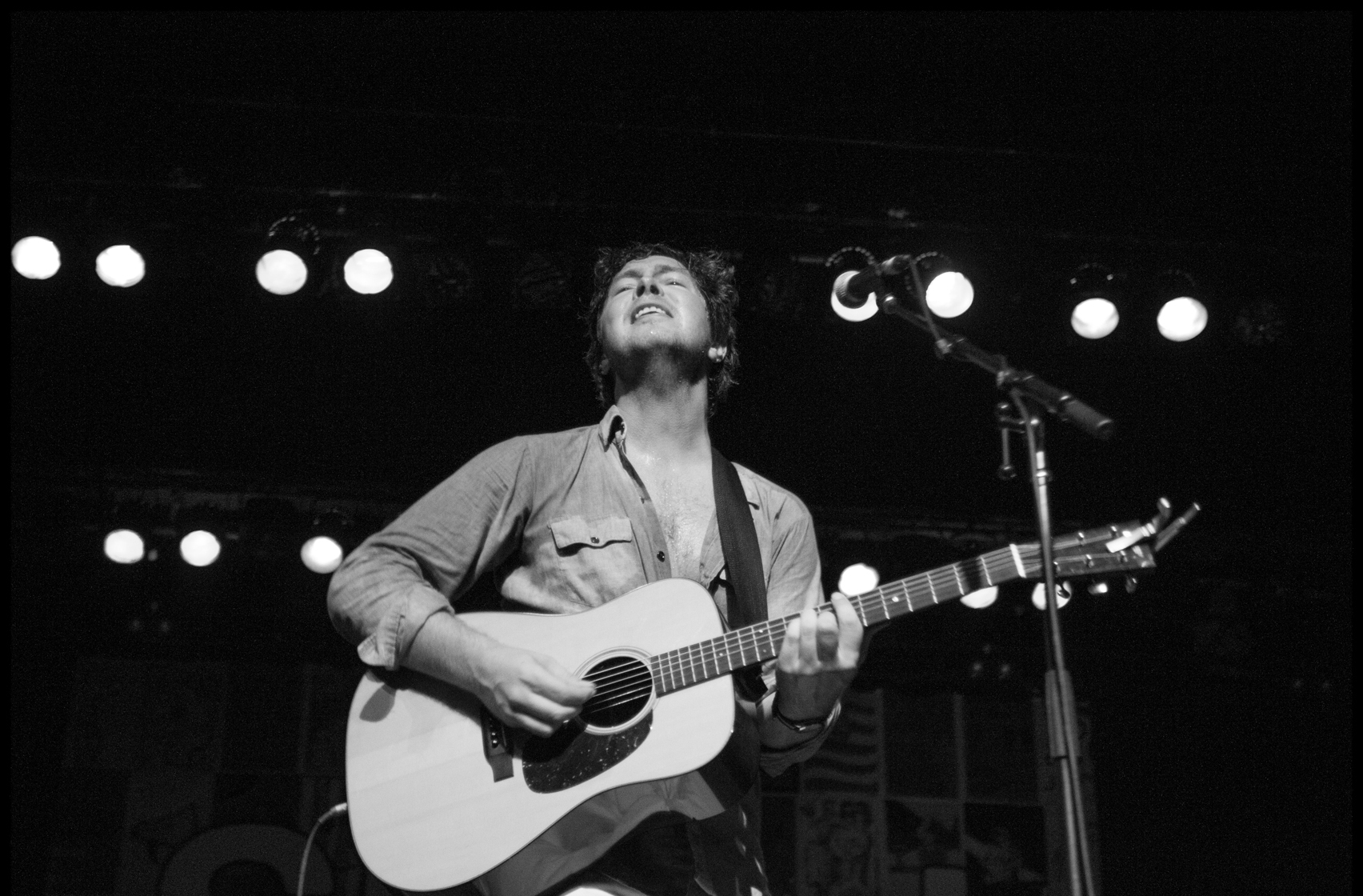
- Wertz in September 2012

Background information
- Born: Matthew Stewart Wertz; February 17, 1979 (age 47); Liberty, Missouri, U.S.
- Origin: Nashville, Tennessee, US
- Genres: Acoustic; alternative rock; soft rock; indie rock
- Occupations: Singer-songwriter, musician
- Instruments: Guitar, vocals
- Years active: 2001–present
- Labels: Nettwerk, Universal Republic
- Website: www.mattwertz.com

Matthew Stewart Wertz (born February 17, 1979) is an American singer-songwriter. Originally from LaVale, MD, as of 2014 he lives in Nashville, Tennessee.

== Life and career ==
Born and raised a Christian in Liberty, Missouri, Wertz's interest in visual art led him to study at the University of Illinois at Urbana-Champaign where he graduated with a degree in industrial design. While there, his musical talents and ambitions grew. He started writing songs his first year of college. After graduation in 2001, Wertz moved to Nashville gained a considerable fan base by performing at Young Life camps, after releasing his first album, Somedays, produced by Steve Wilson.

His next studio album, Twenty Three Places (2003) was produced with Ed Cash. Today & Tomorrow was produced by Wertz and best friend Dave Barnes in 2005, and thanks to his constant touring, the singer was signed to Nettwerk Records.

On September 19, 2006, Wertz released his third studio album, Everything in Between. In late 2007, he went back on the road with fellow singer-songwriter and friend Dave Barnes. Their aptly named tour, Two Birds/One Stone, toured around the US, ending in Nashville.

In December 2007, Wertz signed with Universal Republic and released Under Summer Sun in September 2008 featuring some new material as well as cuts off Everything in Between.

In November 2009, Wertz announced on his website that he is no longer with Universal Republic and to celebrate, he began giving away If It Ain't Broke..., recorded live at The Triple Door in Seattle on May 28, 2008, as a free album.

In January 2011, Wertz released the single, "Feels So Right", as part of his album, Weights & Wings, released on March 15, 2011. He began a tour to promote the album on March 25, 2011, in New York City. He also released a holiday-themed album, Snowglobe, in late 2011.

In anticipation of Wherever/Whenever EP, released on April 1, 2013, Matt Wertz gave away a collection of his personal favorite songs from his celebrated 13-year career on NoiseTrade. Heatwave was released on August 27, 2013. Its first single is "Get to You".

Wertz has toured with such acts as Hanson, Jon McLaughlin, Jason Mraz, Jamie Cullum, Gavin Degraw, Matt Nathanson, Five For Fighting, O.A.R., Ben Rector and Jars of Clay, and has headlined several tours nationally in the early-to-mid-2000s (decade).

== Discography ==
=== Albums ===
List of albums, with additional information
Album	Information
Somedays	Released: 2001; First album; Produced by Steve Wilson
Orange EP	Released: 2002; Independent
Twentythree Places	Released: 2003; Second album; Produced by Ed Cash and Matt Wertz
Live in Paradise	Released: 2004; Live from Boston, MA
Today & Tomorrow EP	Released: 2005; Independent EP; Produced by Dave Barnes and Matt Wertz
Everything in Between	Released: 2006; Third full-length studio album; Produced by Ed Cash and Matt Wertz
Under Summer Sun	Released: 2008; Fourth full-length studio album; Universal Republic Records
Where We Started EP	Released: 2008; Universal Republic Records EP
If It Ain't Broke...	Released: 2009; Full-length live album
While We're Becoming EP	Released: 2010; Handwritten Records EP
Weights & Wings	Released: 2011; Fifth full-length studio album; Nettwerk Music Group
Snow Globe	Released: 2012; Provident Label Group
Whenever/Wherever EP	Released: 2013; Handwritten Records EP
Heatwave	Released: 2013; Sixth full-length studio album; Handwritten Records; Produced by Brandon Hood and Matt Wertz
Old Flames	Released: 2014; Handwritten Records EP; Nettwerk Music Group
Gun Shy	Released: 2016; Seventh full-length studio album; Handwritten Records
Recently	Released: 2023; Eighth full-length studio album; Handwritten Records

=== Singles ===
(selective)

- 2006: "Carolina"
- 2011: "Feels So Right"
- 2013: "Get to You"

==== As featured artist ====
- 2019: Fences (Vicetone featuring Matt Wertz)
