= The Voice (American TV series) season 16 =

The Voice
- Season 16
- Promotional poster featuring coaches Levine, Legend, Clarkson, and Shelton
- Hosted by: Carson Daly
- Coaches: Adam Levine; John Legend; Kelly Clarkson; Blake Shelton; Bebe Rexha (Comeback stage)
- No. of contestants: 54 artists
- Winner: Maelyn Jarmon
- Winning coach: John Legend
- Runner-up: Gyth Rigdon
- No. of episodes: 23

Release
- Original network: NBC
- Original release: February 25 – May 21, 2019

Season chronology
- ← Previous; Season 15 Next → Season 17

The sixteenth season of the American reality television show The Voice premiered on February 25, 2019, on NBC. Adam Levine, Kelly Clarkson, and Blake Shelton returning as coaches from the previous season. John Legend was a new addition as a coach this season, replacing Jennifer Hudson. This became the eleventh season to feature three male coaches on the panel since season 10. For the second time, the show featured a fifth coach, Bebe Rexha, who selected contestants to participate in The Comeback Stage, replacing Kelsea Ballerini as the fifth coach.

This is the first season trios are allowed in the show, and also the first (and only) season to feature a "Live Cross Battles", similar to the Chinese counterpart of The Voice (The Voice of China and Sing! China) whereas artists compete against artists from opposing teams for a place in the Live Shows. "The Comeback Stage" twist also returned and it now extended until the "Live Cross Battles". The Live Shows now followed eliminations similar to the semifinals since season 9 with the artists receiving a higher vote count directly advances or lower vote count eliminated immediately.

Maelyn Jarmon was named the winner of the season, marking John Legend's first win as a coach and making him the second new coach (after Clarkson) to have a winning artist on his first attempt. As of April 2026, this is the most recent season John Legend's team have won the show.

== Coaches and hosts ==
Coaches and Host of The Voice Season 16

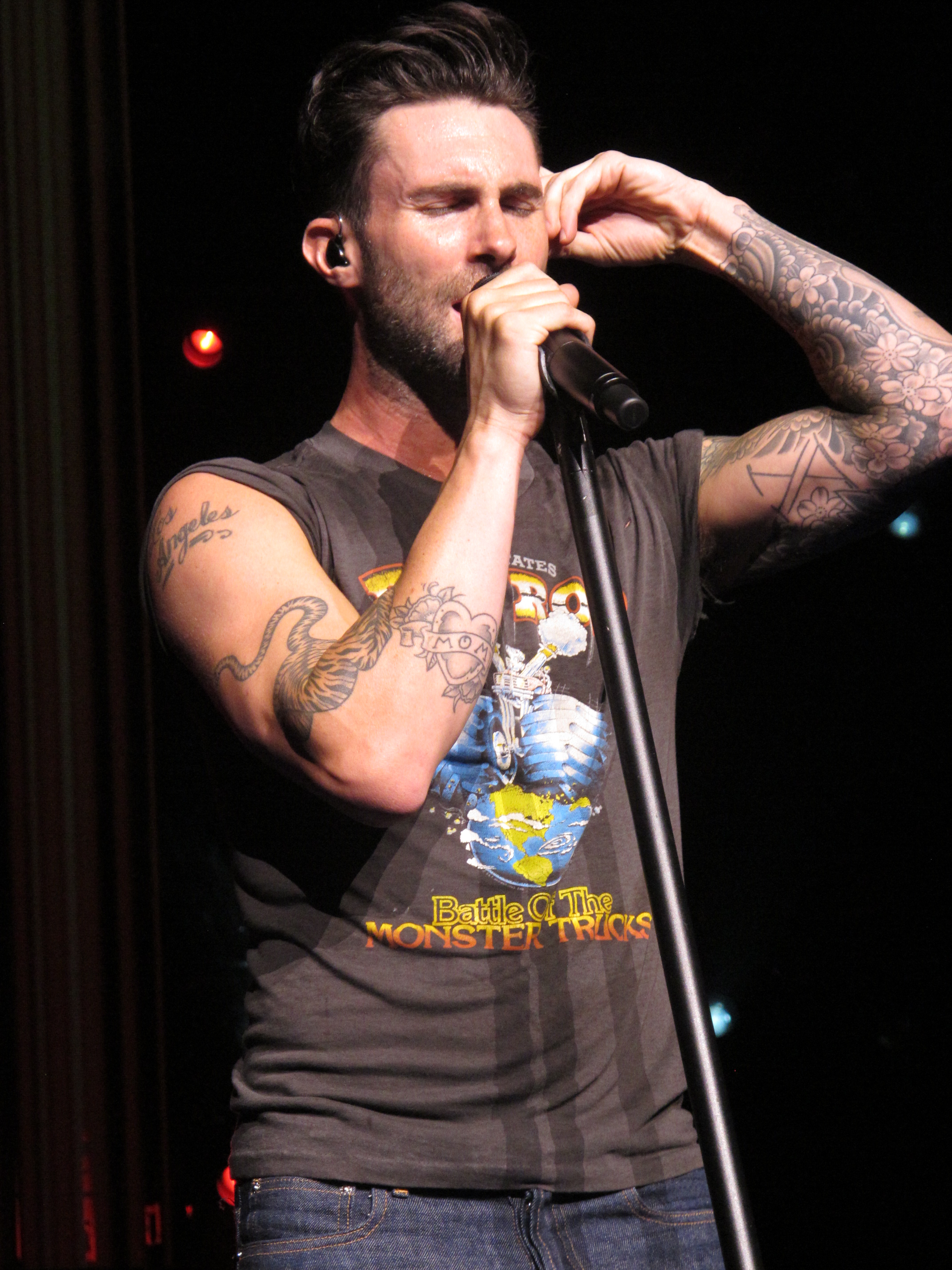
Adam Levine

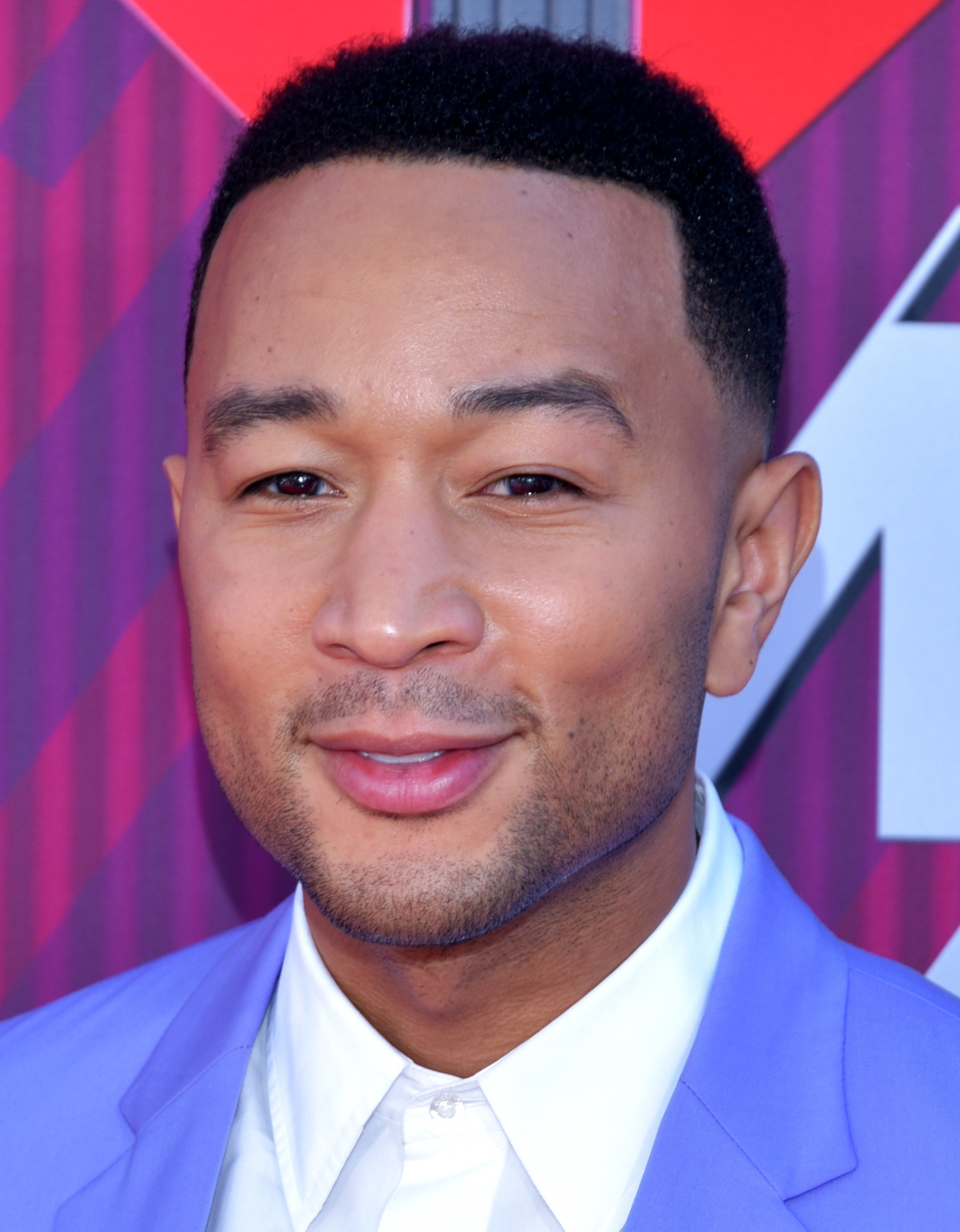
John Legend

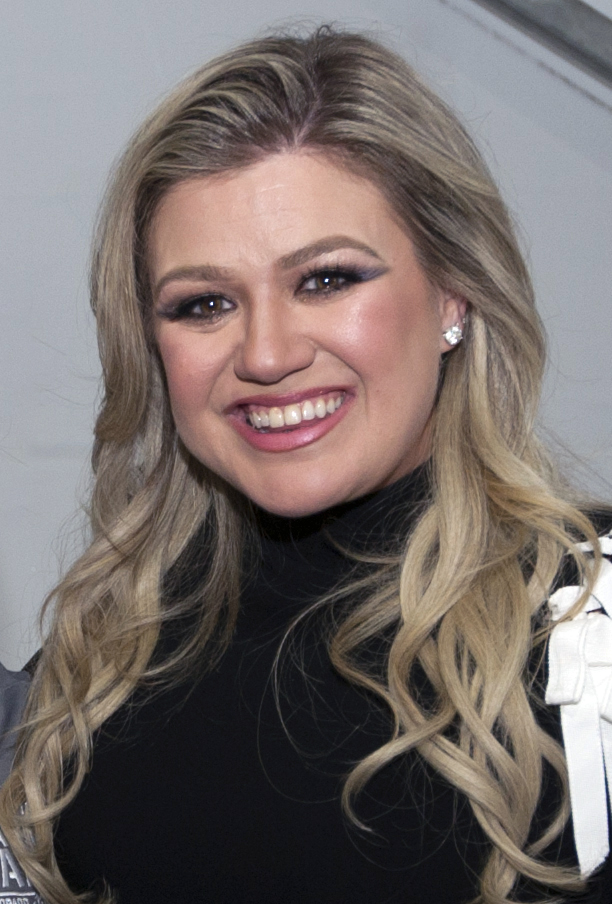
Kelly Clarkson

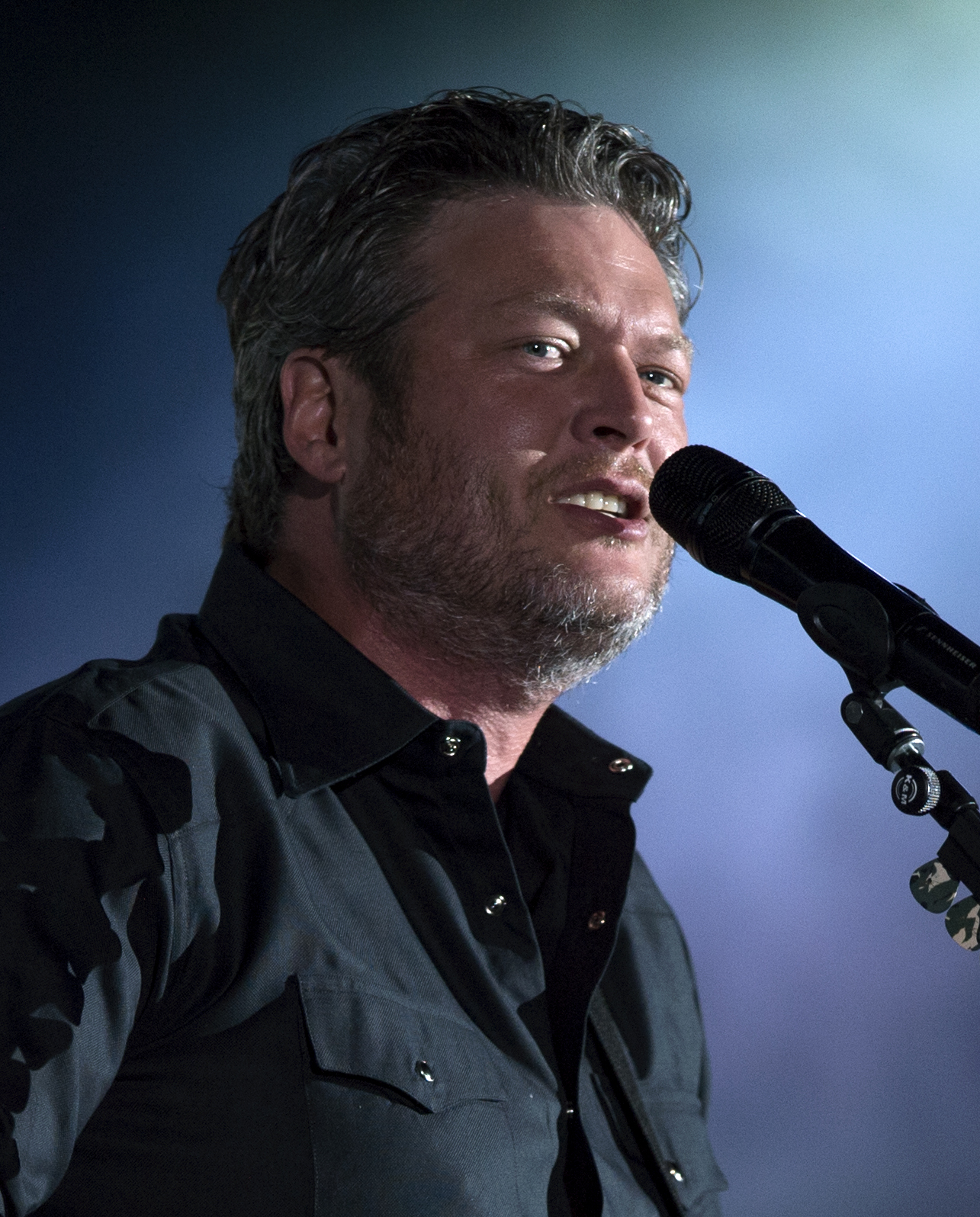
Blake Shelton

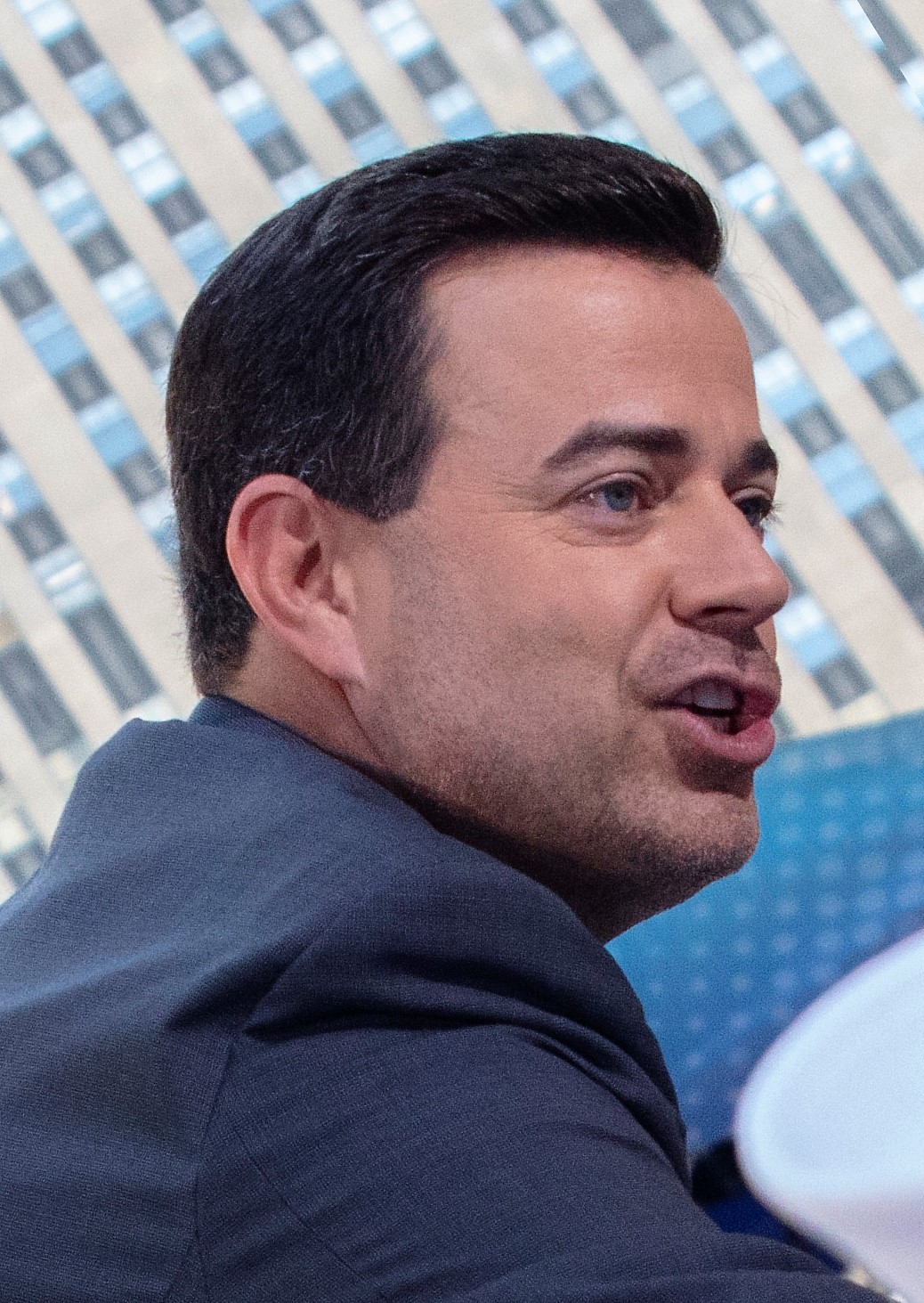
Carson Daly

On September 13, 2018, John Legend was confirmed as a new coach, replacing Jennifer Hudson, who opted out from the coaching panel to serve as coach of The Voice UK. Legend joined returning coaches Adam Levine, Blake Shelton and Kelly Clarkson. Carson Daly returned for his sixteenth season as host. This is Legend's second appearance after he appeared as Team Adam's battle advisor on the 12th season. This is also Legend and Clarkson's second competition show before the show appearing Duets. This season's advisors for the Battle Rounds are Charlie Puth (who previously appeared in the 11th season in the series as an advisor) for Team Adam, Kelsea Ballerini (who was the coach for last season's "Comeback Stage") for Team Kelly, Khalid for Team Legend, and Brooks & Dunn for Team Blake.

== Teams ==
Main Competition

- Winner
- Runner-up
- Third place
- Fourth place
- Eliminated in the Live Shows
- Eliminated in the Live Playoffs
- Stolen in the Live Cross Battles
- Eliminated in the Live Cross Battles
- Eliminated but selected to participate in The Comeback Stage
- Stolen in the Battle rounds
- Eliminated in the Battle rounds

The Comeback Stage

- Joined another team
- Eliminated in the Live Playoffs
- Eliminated in the Finals
- Eliminated in the Semifinals
- Eliminated in the Second Battle rounds
- Eliminated in the First Battle rounds

Coaches	Top 54 artists				
Adam Levine					
Adam Levine	LB Crew	Mari Jones	Betsy Ade	Domenic Haynes	Kalvin Jarvis
Adam Levine	~~LB Crew~~	~~Kendra Checketts~~	~~Celia Babini~~	~~Rod Stokes~~	Andrew Jannakos
Adam Levine	~~Ciera Dumas~~	~~Jimmy Mowery~~	~~Karly Moreno~~	Patrick McAloon	Anthony Ortiz
Adam Levine	Trey Rose				
John Legend					
John Legend	Maelyn Jarmon	Shawn Sounds	Celia Babini	Jacob Maxwell	Jimmy Mowery
John Legend	Lisa Ramey	Julian King	Beth Griffith-Manley	Kayslin Victoria	~~Savannah Brister~~
John Legend	~~Oliv Blu~~	~~Betsy Ade~~	~~Matthew Johnson~~	Denton Arnell	Talon Cardon
Kelly Clarkson					
Kelly Clarkson	Rod Stokes	Jej Vinson	Rebecca Howell	Matthew Johnson	Abby Kasch
Kelly Clarkson	Presley Tennant	~~Betsy Ade~~	The Bundys	Karen Galera	~~David Owens~~
Kelly Clarkson	~~Beth Griffith-Manley~~	Mikaela Astel	Alena D'Amico	Jackson Marlow	Rizzi Myers
Blake Shelton					
Blake Shelton	Gyth Rigdon	Dexter Roberts	Andrew Sevener	Kim Cherry	Carter Lloyd Horne
Blake Shelton	Oliv Blu	Kendra Checketts	Selkii	Karly Moreno	~~Kendra Checketts~~
Blake Shelton	~~Rod Stokes~~	Dalton Dover	Cecily Hennigan	LiLi Joy	Hannah Kay
Bebe Rexha					
Bebe Rexha	~~LB Crew~~	Kanard Thomas	Ciera Dumas	Savannah Brister	David Owens
Bebe Rexha	Kayla Seeber	Nathan & Chesi	Crystal Rose	J.T. Rodriguez	Klea Olson
Note: Italicized names are stolen artists (names struck through within former teams). Underlined names are artists who were saved by their coach in the Live Cross Battles and advanced to the Live Playoffs. The Bold name is "The Comeback Stage" winner who joined another team of their choosing (name struck through within former team).

== Blind auditions ==
Color key

✔	Coach pressed "I WANT YOU" button
	Artist defaulted to a coach's team
	Artist selected to join this coach's team
	Artist was eliminated and was not invited back for "The Comeback Stage"
	Artist was eliminated, but got a second chance to compete in "The Comeback Stage"
✘	Coach pressed "I WANT YOU" button, but was blocked by another coach from getting the artist
	Blocked by Adam; Blocked by John; Blocked by Kelly; Blocked by Blake

=== Episode 1 (Feb. 25) ===
Order	Artist	Age	Hometown	Song	Coach's and artist's choices			
Order	Artist	Age	Hometown	Song	Adam	John	Kelly	Blake
1	Gyth Rigdon	24	Singer, Louisiana	"Drift Away"	–	✘	✔	✔
2	Maelyn Jarmon	26	Frisco, Texas	"Fields of Gold"	✔	✔	✔	✔
3	Karen Galera	19	Dallas, Texas	"Mi Corazoncito"	–	✔	✔	–
4	Trey Rose	27	Hugo, Oklahoma	"Wake Me Up"	✔	–	–	✔
5	Kim Cherry	30	Niceville, Florida	"No Scrubs"	–	–	✔	✔
6	AJ Ryan	30	Brooklyn, New York	"Love Runs Out"	–	–	–	–
7	Rizzi Myers	29	Nashville, Tennessee	"Breathin"	–	✘	✔	✔
8	Lisa Ramey	33	New York, New York	"Sex on Fire"	–	✔	–	–
9	Jimmy Mowery	31	Altoona, Pennsylvania	"Attention"	✔	✔	–	–
10	LiLi Joy	15	Chino Hills, California	"Cool"	–	–	–	✔
11	Nathan & Chesi	27 & 28	Paintsville, Kentucky	"Waymore's Blues"	–	–	–	–
12	Matthew Johnson	26	Jacksonville, Florida	"I Smile"	✔	✔	✔	✔

=== Episode 2 (Feb. 26) ===
Order	Artist	Age	Hometown	Song	Coach's and artist's choices			
Order	Artist	Age	Hometown	Song	Adam	John	Kelly	Blake
1	Domenic Haynes	18	Tampa, Florida	"River"	✔	✘	–	✔
2	Savannah Brister	17	Memphis, Tennessee	"Don't You Worry 'Bout a Thing"	–	✔	✔	–
3	The Bundys	25 - 31	Cincinnati, Ohio	"Closer to Fine"	–	–	✔	✔
4	Klea Olson	20	Layton, Utah	"No Roots"	–	–	–	–
5	Hannah Kay	18	Magnolia, Texas	"Coal Miner's Daughter"	–	–	✔	✔
6	Julian King	25	Philadelphia, Pennsylvania	"All Time Low"	✘	✔	–	–

=== Episode 3 (March 4) ===
This episode is dedicated in memory of season 13 contestant Janice Freeman who died of a blood clot in her lung two days before this episode aired.

Order	Artist	Age	Hometown	Song	Coach's and artist's choices			
Order	Artist	Age	Hometown	Song	Adam	John	Kelly	Blake
1	Jacob Maxwell	20	Coeur d'Alene, Idaho	"Delicate"	–	✔	✔	–
2	Karly Moreno	23	Mission Viejo, California	"Starving"	✔	–	–	–
3	Luna Searles	37	Atlanta, Georgia	"Nutbush City Limits"	–	–	–	–
4	Carter Lloyd Horne	19	Marietta, Georgia	"Drinkin' Problem"	–	–	✔	✔
5	Talon Cardon	18	Pleasant Grove, Utah	"Say You Won't Let Go"	–	✔	–	–
6	Patrick McAloon	40	Barrington, Rhode Island	"Runaway Train"	✔	✔	–	✔
7	Ruby McAloon	16	Barrington, Rhode Island	"Back to You"	–	–	–	–
8	Alena D’Amico	27	Shelby Charter, Michigan	"In My Blood"	–	–	✔	✔
9	Kanard Thomas	28	Jacksonville, Florida	"Riding With the King"	–	–	–	–
10	Dexter Roberts	27	Fayette, Alabama	"Like a Cowboy"	✔	✔	✔	✔
11	Jej Vinson	22	Davao City, Philippines	"Passionfruit"	✔	✔	✔	✔

=== Episode 4 (March 5) ===
Order	Artist	Age	Hometown	Song	Coach's and artist's choices			
Order	Artist	Age	Hometown	Song	Adam	John	Kelly	Blake
1	Betsy Ade	40	Kenosha, Wisconsin	"Hunger"	✔	✔	–	–
2	Dalton Dover	20	Aragon, Georgia	"Don't Close Your Eyes"	–	–	–	✔
3	Rebecca Howell	18	Cochran, Georgia	"The Night the Lights Went Out In Georgia"	–	✔	✔	✔
4	Kendra Checketts	19	San Diego, California	"Sober"	–	–	–	✔
5	J.T. Rodriguez	28	Chattanooga, Tennessee	"Higher Love"	–	–	–	–
6	LB Crew	29	Little Rock, Arkansas	"Waves"	✔	✔	✔	✔

=== Episode 5 (March 11) ===
Order	Artist	Age	Hometown	Song	Coach's and artist's choices			
Order	Artist	Age	Hometown	Song	Adam	John	Kelly	Blake
1	Beth Griffith-Manley	46	Detroit, Michigan	"Until You Come Back to Me"	–	✔	✔	–
2	Selkii	31	Durban, South Africa	"I Try"	✔	–	–	✔
3	Jae Jin	33	Baltimore, Maryland	"Hallelujah I Love Her So"	–	–	–	–
4	Denton Arnell	32	Chicago, Illinois	"Hold On, We're Going Home"	–	✔	–	–
5	Ciera Dumas	21	Kernersville, North Carolina	"Tell Me You Love Me"	✔	✔	–	–
6	Andrew Sevener	22	Alvarado, Texas	"Honky Tonk Women"	–	–	–	✔
7	Mari	20	Clermont, Florida	"Boo'd Up"	✔	✔	✔	–
8	Crystal Rose	26	Kansas City, Missouri	"Wicked Game"	–	–	–	–
9	Abby Kasch	20	Palos Park, Illinois	"Here for the Party"	–	–	✔	✔
10	Mikaela Astel	14	Queens, New York	"Electric Love"	–	✔	✔	–
11	Anthony Ortiz	20	Tampa, Florida	"What Makes You Beautiful"	✔	–	–	–
12	Oliv Blu	20	Flossmoor, Illinois	"On & On"	–	✔	–	–
13	Kayla Seeber	18	Poplar Grove, Illinois	"...Baby One More Time"	–	–	–	–
14	Shawn Sounds	33	Houston, Texas	"All My Life"	✔	✔	✔	✔

=== Episode 6 (March 18) ===
Order	Artist	Age	Hometown	Song	Coach's and artist's choices			
Order	Artist	Age	Hometown	Song	Adam	John	Kelly	Blake
1	Celia Babini	17	New York, New York	"Idontwannabeyouanymore"	✔	✔	✔	✔
2	Cecily Hennigan	16	Conway, South Carolina	"Foolish Games"	–	–	–	✔
3	Kalvin Jarvis	29	Tucson, Arizona	"A Good Night"	✔	–	✔	–
4	Ava August	13	Laguna Niguel, California	"The House of the Rising Sun"	–	–	–	–
5	David Owens	24	Indianapolis, Indiana	"I Can't Make You Love Me"	–	–	✔	–
6	Presley Tennant	16	Norco, California	"Stone Cold"	–	–	✔	–
7	Rod Stokes	35	Moss Point, Mississippi	"To Love Somebody"	✔	✔	–	✔
8	Calista Garcia	17	Arlington, Virginia	"Wishing Well"	–	–	–	Team full
9	Andrew Jannakos	25	Flowery Branch, Georgia	"Beautiful Crazy"	✔	–	✔	Team full
10	Kayslin Victoria	16	Clermont, Florida	"Feel It Still"	Team full	✔	✔	Team full
11	Maddi Fraser	24	La Canada Flintridge, California	"Get It While You Can"	Team full	Team full	–	Team full
12	Jackson Marlow	18	Rogersville, Alabama	"Troubadour"	Team full	Team full	✔	Team full

=== Episode 7 (March 20) ===
This episode, titled "The Best of The Blind Auditions," featured certain Blind Auditions from the season before the battles began.

== Battles ==
The Battle Rounds started on March 25. Season sixteen's advisors include: Charlie Puth for Team Adam, Khalid for Team John, Kelsea Ballerini for Team Kelly, and Brooks & Dunn for Team Blake. The coaches could steal two losing artists from other coaches. Contestants who won their battle or were stolen by another coach advanced to the new Live Cross Battles, which replaced the Knockout Rounds. Three eliminated artists were chosen by Bebe Rexha and have the opportunity to compete in "The Comeback Stage".

Color key

Artist won the Battle and advanced to the Live Cross Battles
Artist lost the Battle but was stolen by another coach and advanced to Live Cross Battles
Artist lost the Battle but got a second chance to compete in "The Comeback Stage"
Artist lost the Battle and was eliminated

Episodes	Coach	Order	Winner	Song	Loser	'Steal' result			
Episodes	Coach	Order	Winner	Song	Loser	Adam	John	Kelly	Blake
Episode 8 (Monday, March 25, 2019)	John Legend	1	Shawn Sounds	"Never Too Much"	Matthew Johnson	✔	—N/a	✔	–
Episode 8 (Monday, March 25, 2019)	Kelly Clarkson	2	The Bundys	"Songbird"	Mikaela Astel	–	–	—N/a	–
Episode 8 (Monday, March 25, 2019)	Blake Shelton	3	Gyth Rigdon	"Drunk Me"	Rod Stokes	✔	–	–	—N/a
Episode 8 (Monday, March 25, 2019)	Adam Levine	4	Domenic Haynes	"I Need a Dollar"	Trey Rose	—N/a	–	–	–
Episode 8 (Monday, March 25, 2019)	John Legend	5	Maelyn Jarmon	"When We Were Young"	Savannah Brister	–	—N/a	–	–
Episode 8 (Monday, March 25, 2019)	Kelly Clarkson	6	Jej Vinson	"Jealous"	Beth Griffith-Manley	–	✔	—N/a	–
Episode 9 (Monday, April 1, 2019)	Adam Levine	1	Celia Babini	"FRIENDS"	Karly Moreno	—N/a	–	–	✔
Episode 9 (Monday, April 1, 2019)	John Legend	2	Julian King	"Grenade"	Denton Arnell	–	—N/a	–	–
Episode 9 (Monday, April 1, 2019)	Kelly Clarkson	3	Presley Tennant	"Whataya Want from Me"	Rizzi Myers	–	–	—N/a	–
Episode 9 (Monday, April 1, 2019)	Blake Shelton	4	Dexter Roberts	"Hurricane"	Dalton Dover	–	–	–	—N/a
Episode 9 (Monday, April 1, 2019)	Adam Levine	5	LB Crew	"Done For Me"	Ciera Dumas	—N/a	–	–	–
Episode 9 (Monday, April 1, 2019)	Blake Shelton	6	Kim Cherry	"Here"	Kendra Checketts	✔	✔	–	—N/a
Episode 10 (Monday, April 8, 2019)	John Legend	1	Lisa Ramey	"The Joke"	Betsy Ade	Team full	—N/a	✔	–
Episode 10 (Monday, April 8, 2019)	Adam Levine	2	Mari	"I Like Me Better"	Anthony Ortiz	Team full	–	Team full	–
Episode 10 (Monday, April 8, 2019)	Blake Shelton	3	Andrew Sevener	"Tequila"	Hannah Kay	Team full	–	Team full	—N/a
Episode 10 (Monday, April 8, 2019)	Kelly Clarkson	4	Abby Kasch	"Bring On the Rain"	Jackson Marlow	Team full	–	Team full	–
Episode 10 (Monday, April 8, 2019)	John Legend	5	Jacob Maxwell	"Every Little Thing She Does is Magic"	Talon Cardon	Team full	—N/a	Team full	–
Episode 10 (Monday, April 8, 2019)	Kelly Clarkson	6	Rebecca Howell	"Unchained Melody"	David Owens	Team full	–	Team full	–
Episode 10 (Monday, April 8, 2019)	Adam Levine	7	Kalvin Jarvis	"U Got It Bad"	Jimmy Mowery	Team full	✔	Team full	–
Episode 11 (Tuesday, April 9, 2019)	Adam Levine	1	Andrew Jannakos	"Free Fallin"	Patrick McAloon	Team full	Team full	Team full	–
Episode 11 (Tuesday, April 9, 2019)	Blake Shelton	2	Selkii	"Head Above Water"	Cecily Hennigan	Team full	Team full	Team full	—N/a
Episode 11 (Tuesday, April 9, 2019)	Blake Shelton	3	Carter Lloyd Horne	"I Got You Babe"	LiLi Joy	Team full	Team full	Team full	—N/a
Episode 11 (Tuesday, April 9, 2019)	Kelly Clarkson	4	Karen Galera	"Imagine"	Alena D'Amico	Team full	Team full	Team full	–
Episode 11 (Tuesday, April 9, 2019)	John Legend	5	Kayslin Victoria	"Location"	Oliv Blu	Team full	Team full	Team full	✔

== The Comeback Stage ==
This season's fifth coach, Bebe Rexha, mentored selected artists who did not make a team during the Blind Auditions as well as eliminated artists from later rounds of the competition, thus creating new rounds to The Comeback Stage. During the first round of competition, the six selected artists went head to head, two artists per episode, and Rexha selected a winner to move on to the next round. In the second round, Rexha brought back three artists who were eliminated during the Battle Rounds, giving them a chance to re-enter in the competition. These artists faced off against the three artists from the first round. The three winners performed in the Semifinals and one artist was eliminated. In the Finale, Rexha picked one artist to move forward and compete against another eliminated artist from the Live Cross Battles. The two remaining artists performed in the Top 24 Live Results Show for America's votes in the Twitter Instant Save, with the winner officially joining one of the four main teams of their choosing as a part of the Top 13.

=== The Battles ===
Artist won the battle and advanced to the next round
Artist lost the battle and was eliminated

==== First Round (from blind audition) ====
Episode (Digital)	Coach	Song	Artists		Song
Episode (Digital)	Coach	Song	Winner	Loser	Song
Episode 1 (Tuesday, Feb. 26, 2019)	Bebe Rexha	"Tulsa Time"	Nathan and Chesi	Klea Olson	"Brand New Key"
Episode 2 (Tuesday, March 5, 2019)	Bebe Rexha	"Let's Get It On"	Kanard Thomas	J.T. Rodriguez	"Stormy Monday"
Episode 3 (Tuesday, March 12, 2019)	Bebe Rexha	"What You Know"	Kayla Seeber	Crystal Rose	"At Last"

==== Second round ====
Episode (Digital)	Coach	Song	Artists		Song
Episode (Digital)	Coach	Song	Winner	Loser	Song
Episode 4 (Monday, March 25, 2019)	Bebe Rexha	"She Used to Be Mine"	Savannah Brister	Nathan & Chesi	"Drift Away"
Episode 5 (Monday, April 1, 2019)	Bebe Rexha	"Ain't Nobody"	Ciera Dumas	Kayla Seeber	"Believe"
Episode 6 (Monday, April 8, 2019)	Bebe Rexha	"Burn"	Kanard Thomas	David Owens	"OK, It's Alright With Me"

=== The Semifinals ===
Artists won the Semifinals and advanced to the Finale
Artist lost the Semifinals and was eliminated

Episode (Digital)	Coach	Song	Artists		Song
Episode (Digital)	Coach	Song	Winners	Loser	Song
Episode 7 (Tuesday, April 16, 2019)	Bebe Rexha	"Wish I Didn't Love You"	Ciera Dumas	Savannah Brister	"Always On My Mind"
Episode 7 (Tuesday, April 16, 2019)	Bebe Rexha	"Redbone"	Kanard Thomas	Savannah Brister	"Always On My Mind"

=== The Finals ===
Artists won the Finals and advanced to the Live Playoffs
Artist lost the Finals and was eliminated

Episode (Digital)	Coach	Song	Artists		Song
Episode (Digital)	Coach	Song	Winner	Loser	Song
Episode 8 (Tuesday, April 23, 2019)	Bebe Rexha	"All My Life"	Kanard Thomas	Ciera Dumas	"I Can't Make You Love Me"

=== Live Playoffs ===
Artist received majority of America's votes and got a spot into the Top 13
Artist was eliminated

Episode	Coach	Song	Artists		Song
Episode	Coach	Song	Winner	Loser	Song
Episode 17 (Tuesday, April 30, 2019)	Bebe Rexha	"Electric Feel"	LB Crew	Kanard Thomas	"Call Out My Name"

== Live shows ==
=== Weeks 1 & 2: Live Cross Battles (April 15, 16, 22, & 23) ===
The new Live Cross Battles round began with 32 artists remaining in the competition. Over the course of two weeks, eight pairs of artists performed each Monday. Coaches selected an artist from their team, then challenged a fellow coach to compete against, and this coach selected an artist as well. On the Tuesday results shows, the winner of each Cross Battle was revealed, for a total of 16 artists advancing to the next round based on America's votes. Each coach also had one save and one steal to use over the course of the Cross Battles. Coaches were only given ten seconds to press their button. 24 artists in total advanced to the next round of competition. The table for the Cross Battles are reflected by the order of the results announcement and not by the order of performance.

- Note: The table below is ordered by the results' announcement, as the performances' order was not the same.

Color key:

Artist won the Cross Battle and advanced to the Live Playoffs
Artist lost the Cross Battle but was stolen by another coach and advanced to the Live Playoffs
Artist lost the Cross Battle but was saved by his/her coach and advanced to the Live Playoffs
Artist lost the Cross Battle but got a second chance to compete in "The Comeback Stage"
Artist lost the Cross Battle and was eliminated

Episodes	Order	Challenger			Challenged			'Steal'/'Save' result			
Episodes	Order	Coach	Song	Artist	Artist	Song	Coach	Adam	John	Kelly	Blake
Episodes 12 & 13 (Monday, April 15 & Tuesday, April 16, 2019)	1	Blake	"Poison"	Kim Cherry	Betsy Ade	"You Oughta Know"	Kelly	✔	✔	—	—
Episodes 12 & 13 (Monday, April 15 & Tuesday, April 16, 2019)	4	Kelly	"Who's Lovin' You"	Matthew Johnson	Domenic Haynes	"Damn Your Eyes"	Adam	✔	—	—	—
Episodes 12 & 13 (Monday, April 15 & Tuesday, April 16, 2019)	8	John	"Mad World"	Maelyn Jarmon	Rod Stokes	"How Am I Supposed to Live Without You"	Adam	Team full	—	✔	—
Episodes 12 & 13 (Monday, April 15 & Tuesday, April 16, 2019)	6	Adam	"A Thousand Years"	Celia Babini	Oliv Blu	"Gravity"	Blake	Team full	✔	Steal used	—
Episodes 12 & 13 (Monday, April 15 & Tuesday, April 16, 2019)	5	Kelly	"Love On The Brain"	Presley Tennant	Kayslin Victoria	"Stay"	John	Team full	—	Steal used	—
Episodes 12 & 13 (Monday, April 15 & Tuesday, April 16, 2019)	3	John	"It Hurt So Bad"	Lisa Ramey	Karen Galera	"Unfaithful"	Kelly	Team full	Steal used	—	—
Episodes 12 & 13 (Monday, April 15 & Tuesday, April 16, 2019)	2	Adam	"My My My!"	Mari	Selkii	"Torn"	Blake	Team full	Steal used	Steal used	✔
Episodes 12 & 13 (Monday, April 15 & Tuesday, April 16, 2019)	7	Blake	"Believe"	Dexter Roberts	Andrew Jannakos	"Yours"	Adam	Team full	Steal used	Steal used	—
Episodes 14 & 15 (Monday, April 22 & Tuesday, April 23, 2019)	1	Adam	"Wade in the Water"	LB Crew	Jej Vinson	"Versace on the Floor"	Kelly	Team full	Steal used	Steal used	—
Episodes 14 & 15 (Monday, April 22 & Tuesday, April 23, 2019)	6	Adam	"Cold Water"	Kendra Checketts	Jimmy Mowery	"Mercy"	John	Team full	Steal used	Steal used	✔
Episodes 14 & 15 (Monday, April 22 & Tuesday, April 23, 2019)	5	John	"Lay Me Down"	Shawn Sounds	Karly Moreno	"Down"	Blake	Team full	Steal used	Steal used	Team full
Episodes 14 & 15 (Monday, April 22 & Tuesday, April 23, 2019)	3	Blake	"Way Down We Go"	Carter Lloyd Horne	Jacob Maxwell	"You're Still the One"	John	Team full	✔	Steal used	Team full
Episodes 14 & 15 (Monday, April 22 & Tuesday, April 23, 2019)	2	Adam	"New Rules"	Kalvin Jarvis	Julian King	"Hello"	John	Team full	Team full	Steal used	Team full
Episodes 14 & 15 (Monday, April 22 & Tuesday, April 23, 2019)	7	Kelly	"Any Man of Mine"	Rebecca Howell	Beth Griffith Manley	"I Put A Spell On You"	John	Team full	Team full	Steal used	Team full
Episodes 14 & 15 (Monday, April 22 & Tuesday, April 23, 2019)	8	Blake	"Goodbye Time"	Gyth Rigdon	Abby Kasch	"Cupid’s Got a Shotgun"	Kelly	Team full	Team full	✔	Team full
Episodes 14 & 15 (Monday, April 22 & Tuesday, April 23, 2019)	4	Kelly	"The Letter"	The Bundys	Andrew Sevener	"Modern Day Bonnie and Clyde"	Blake	Team full	Team full	Team full	Team full

Non-competition performances
Order	Performer(s)	Song
13.1	John Legend	"Preach"
15.1	Brynn Cartelli	"Grow Young"

=== Week 3: Playoffs (April 29 & 30) ===
The new Live Top 24 round took place on April 29, with results following on April 30. Eight artists from any four teams were saved by the public and advance to the Top 13. Each coach chose one of their own artists to advance. This becomes the only season in which a coach has had more than 4 artists in the Lives, as Shelton advanced 6 artists to the Live shows.

This season, same as last season, the artist who racked up the most streams on Apple Music during the voting window had their Apple Music votes multiplied by 5. The recipient of the Apple Music multiplier was Gyth Rigdon. Kanard Thomas, the winner of the Comeback Stage Finals, competed against LB Crew who was eliminated in the Live Cross Battles. America chose LB through an Instant Save, and he completed the Top 13 by rejoining Team Adam.

Color key:

Artist was saved by the Public's votes
Artist was saved by his/her coach
Artist's Apple Music vote multiplied by 5 after his/her studio version of the song had the most streams of the night
Artist was eliminated

Episode	Coach	Order	Artist	Song	Result
Episode 16 (Monday, April 29, 2019)	Kelly Clarkson	1	Rod Stokes	"Midnight Rider"	Public's vote
Episode 16 (Monday, April 29, 2019)	Kelly Clarkson	2	Matthew Johnson	"Ordinary People"	Eliminated
Episode 16 (Monday, April 29, 2019)	Kelly Clarkson	3	Rebecca Howell	"Wild One"	Eliminated
Episode 16 (Monday, April 29, 2019)	Kelly Clarkson	4	Presley Tennant	"Nothing Breaks Like a Heart"	Eliminated
Episode 16 (Monday, April 29, 2019)	Kelly Clarkson	5	Abby Kasch	"I Got the Boy"	Eliminated
Episode 16 (Monday, April 29, 2019)	Kelly Clarkson	6	Jej Vinson	"Love Lies"	Kelly's choice
Episode 16 (Monday, April 29, 2019)	John Legend	7	Lisa Ramey	"The Weight"	Eliminated
Episode 16 (Monday, April 29, 2019)	John Legend	8	Jacob Maxwell	"Total Eclipse of the Heart"	Eliminated
Episode 16 (Monday, April 29, 2019)	John Legend	9	Jimmy Mowery	"Youngblood"	Eliminated
Episode 16 (Monday, April 29, 2019)	John Legend	10	Celia Babini	"The Chain"	John's choice
Episode 16 (Monday, April 29, 2019)	John Legend	11	Maelyn Jarmon	"Fallingwater"	Public's vote
Episode 16 (Monday, April 29, 2019)	John Legend	12	Shawn Sounds	"Higher Ground"	Public's vote
Episode 16 (Monday, April 29, 2019)	Adam Levine	13	Kalvin Jarvis	"Mine"	Eliminated
Episode 16 (Monday, April 29, 2019)	Adam Levine	14	Betsy Ade	"Are You Gonna Be My Girl"	Eliminated
Episode 16 (Monday, April 29, 2019)	Adam Levine	15	Mari	"Work It Out"	Adam's choice
Episode 16 (Monday, April 29, 2019)	Adam Levine	16	Domenic Haynes	"Love Is a Losing Game"	Eliminated
Episode 16 (Monday, April 29, 2019)	Blake Shelton	17	Andrew Sevener	"Boots On"	Public's vote
Episode 16 (Monday, April 29, 2019)	Blake Shelton	18	Selkii	"Iris"	Eliminated
Episode 16 (Monday, April 29, 2019)	Blake Shelton	19	Oliv Blu	"The Girl from Ipanema"	Blake's choice
Episode 16 (Monday, April 29, 2019)	Blake Shelton	20	Gyth Rigdon	"I Want to Be Loved Like That"	Public's vote
Episode 16 (Monday, April 29, 2019)	Blake Shelton	21	Kendra Checketts	"bad guy"	Eliminated
Episode 16 (Monday, April 29, 2019)	Blake Shelton	22	Carter Lloyd Horne	"Heartbreak Hotel"	Public's vote
Episode 16 (Monday, April 29, 2019)	Blake Shelton	23	Kim Cherry	"Waterfalls"	Public's vote
Episode 16 (Monday, April 29, 2019)	Blake Shelton	24	Dexter Roberts	"Ain't Nothing 'bout You"	Public's vote

Non-competition performances
Order	Performer(s)	Song
17.1	Adam Levine & his team (Betsy Ade, Domenic Haynes, Kalvin Jarvis, and Mari)	"Is This Love"
17.2	Kelly Clarkson	"Broken & Beautiful"

=== Week 4: Top 13 (May 6 & 7) ===
The theme for this week was "Fan Night", meaning that the artists performed songs chosen by the fans.

Eliminations were similar to the semifinal rounds since season nine. The seven artists with the most votes directly advance to the Top eight, while the three artists with the fewest votes were instantly eliminated, and the middle three fought for the remaining spot in the Top 8 via Instant Save.

The recipient of the Apple Music multiplier this week was Maelyn Jarmon in addition to have her single reached #9 of the top 10 chart on iTunes.

With the elimination of Jej Vinson, this was the very first time that Kelly Clarkson would only have one artist (Rod Stokes) going into the semifinals. Additionally, Vinson would go on later to join Sheer Element in twenty-third season. With the eliminations of Mari and LB Crew, Levine no longer had any artists remaining on his team, making it the third consecutive season (and fifth overall) in which none of his finalists represented in the finale; however, this was the second season in which he had lost his entire team before the semifinals since season three, the first season which this situation occurred.

Color key:

Artist was saved by the Public's votes
Artist was placed in the middle three
Artist was saved by the Instant Save
Artist's Apple Music vote multiplied by 5 (except The Finals) after his/her studio version of the song had the most streams of the night
Artist was eliminated

Episode	Coach	Order	Artist	Song	Result
Episode 18 (Monday, May 6, 2019)	Blake Shelton	1	Gyth Rigdon	"Nobody but Me"	Public's vote
Episode 18 (Monday, May 6, 2019)	Blake Shelton	2	Kim Cherry	"Whatta Man"	Middle Three
Episode 18 (Monday, May 6, 2019)	Kelly Clarkson	3	Jej Vinson	"Close"	Eliminated
Episode 18 (Monday, May 6, 2019)	Blake Shelton	4	Andrew Sevener	"She Got the Best of Me"	Public's vote
Episode 18 (Monday, May 6, 2019)	Blake Shelton	5	Oliv Blu	"Smooth Operator"	Eliminated
Episode 18 (Monday, May 6, 2019)	Blake Shelton	6	Dexter Roberts	"Something Like That"	Public's vote
Episode 18 (Monday, May 6, 2019)	John Legend	7	Shawn Sounds	"A House Is Not a Home"	Public's vote
Episode 18 (Monday, May 6, 2019)	John Legend	8	Celia Babini	"Shallow"	Eliminated
Episode 18 (Monday, May 6, 2019)	Adam Levine	9	LB Crew	"I'll Make Love to You"	Middle Three
Episode 18 (Monday, May 6, 2019)	Adam Levine	10	Mari Jones	"Foolish"	Middle Three
Episode 18 (Monday, May 6, 2019)	Blake Shelton	11	Carter Lloyd Horne	"Let It Go"	Public's vote
Episode 18 (Monday, May 6, 2019)	Kelly Clarkson	12	Rod Stokes	"When a Man Loves a Woman"	Public's vote
Episode 18 (Monday, May 6, 2019)	John Legend	13	Maelyn Jarmon	"The Scientist"	Public's vote
Instant Save Performances
Episode 19 (Tuesday, May 7, 2019)	Blake Shelton	1	Kim Cherry	"My Lovin' (You're Never Gonna Get It)"	Instant Save
Episode 19 (Tuesday, May 7, 2019)	Adam Levine	2	Mari	"Latch"	Eliminated
Episode 19 (Tuesday, May 7, 2019)	Adam Levine	3	LB Crew	"Better"	Eliminated

Non-competition performances
Order	Performer(s)	Song
19.1	John Legend & his team (Celia Babini, Maelyn Jarmon, and Shawn Sounds)	"I Say a Little Prayer"
19.2	Blake Shelton & his team (Oliv Blu, Kim Cherry, Carter Lloyd Horne, Dexter Roberts, Andrew Sevener, and Gyth Rigdon)	"Got My Mind Set On You"

=== Week 5: Semifinals (May 13 & 14) ===
The Top 8 performed on Monday, May 13, 2019, with the results following on Tuesday, May 14, 2019. The three artists with the most votes directly advances on to the finale. The two artists with the fewest votes were immediately eliminated and the middle three contended for the remaining spot in the Finale via the Instant Save. In addition to their individual songs, each artist performed a The Beatles duet with another artist in the competition, though these duets were not available for purchase on iTunes.

With the elimination of Rod Stokes, Kelly Clarkson no longer had any artists remaining on her team, thus breaking her two-season winning streak, and also marked the first season since her debut as a coach none of her artists would represent in the finale, and thus also became the third season, after season 3 & season 7, in which only two coaches would be represented in the finale. Shelton would also become the second coach to represent three artists to the finale, the first one being Levine in the 7th season. This was also the first time since the 8th season in which no female coach would be represented in the finale.

In addition, with the advancement of Maelyn Jarmon to the finale, John Legend became the fourth new coach to successfully coach an artist on his team to the finale on his first attempt as a coach, the third being Clarkson, who coached Brynn Cartelli all the way to the finale of the 14th season, the second being Alicia Keys, who coached Wé McDonald all the way to the finale of the 11th season, and the first being Usher, who coached Michelle Chamuel all the way to the finale of the 4th season.

The singles charted in Top 10 for iTunes charts this week were Jarmon (#3) and Rigdon (#9), with the former becoming the Apple Music multiplier recipient for the second straight week.

Episode	Coach	Order	Artist	Solo Song	The Beatles Duet Song	Results
Episode 20 (Monday, May 13, 2019)	Blake Shelton	1 (10)	Andrew Sevener	"Long Haired Country Boy"	"Help!"	Middle Three
Episode 20 (Monday, May 13, 2019)	Blake Shelton	3 (8)	Gyth Rigdon	"God Bless the U.S.A."	"Hey Jude"	Public's vote
Episode 20 (Monday, May 13, 2019)	Blake Shelton	4 (2)	Kim Cherry	"Together Again"	"Eleanor Rigby"	Eliminated
Episode 20 (Monday, May 13, 2019)	Blake Shelton	6 (10)	Carter Lloyd Horne	"Take Me to Church"	"Help!"	Eliminated
Episode 20 (Monday, May 13, 2019)	Kelly Clarkson	7 (5)	Rod Stokes	"Go Rest High on That Mountain"	"Yesterday"	Middle Three
Episode 20 (Monday, May 13, 2019)	John Legend	9 (5)	Maelyn Jarmon	"Stay"	"Yesterday"	Public's vote
Episode 20 (Monday, May 13, 2019)	Blake Shelton	11 (8)	Dexter Roberts	"Here Without You"	"Hey Jude"	Public's vote
Episode 20 (Monday, May 13, 2019)	John Legend	12 (2)	Shawn Sounds	"A Song for You"	"Eleanor Rigby"	Middle Three
Instant Save performances
Episode 21 (Tuesday, May 14, 2019)	Blake Shelton	1	Andrew Sevener	"Simple Man"		Instant Save
Episode 21 (Tuesday, May 14, 2019)	Kelly Clarkson	2	Rod Stokes	"Brother"		Eliminated
Episode 21 (Tuesday, May 14, 2019)	John Legend	3	Shawn Sounds	"That's What I Like"		Eliminated

Non-competition performances
Order	Performer(s)	Song
21.1	Blake Shelton	"God's Country"
21.2	Kris (Mastercard Advertisement)	"Ain't Nobody"
21.3	Kelly Clarkson & her team (Rod Stokes)	"Chances Are"
21.4	Emily Ann Roberts	"Someday Dream"

=== Week 6: Finale (May 20 & 21) ===
The final 4 performed on Monday, May 20, 2019, with the final results following on Tuesday, May 21, 2019. This week, the four finalists performed a solo cover song, a duet with their coach, and an original song.

The contestant's performances reached the top 10 on iTunes as follows Jarmon (#1, #4 & #8), Rigdon (#5) and Andrew Sevener (#10).

Coach	Artist	Order	Solo Song	Order	Duet Song (with Coach)	Order	Original Song	Result
John Legend	Maelyn Jarmon	12	"Hallelujah"	6	"Unforgettable"	1	"Wait for You"	Winner
Blake Shelton	Andrew Sevener	9	"Lips of an Angel"	2	"All Right Now"	5	“Rural Route Raising”	Fourth place
Blake Shelton	Dexter Roberts	3	"Anything Goes"	10	"Hard Workin' Man"	8	“Looking Back”	Third place
Blake Shelton	Gyth Rigdon	7	"Once in a Blue Moon"	4	"Take It Easy"	11	“Proof I’ve Always Loved You”	Runner-up

Non-competition performances
Order	Performers	Song
23.1	Travis Tritt & Andrew Sevener	"T-R-O-U-B-L-E"
23.2	Jonas Brothers	"Cool"
23.3	Khalid	"Talk"
23.4	Kim Cherry & Mari	"Good as Hell"
23.5	LB Crew, Domenic Haynes, Kalvin Jarvis, Shawn Sounds & Jej Vinson	"My Prerogative"
23.6	OneRepublic	"Rescue Me"
23.7	Hootie & the Blowfish	"Let Her Cry"
23.8	Sarah McLachlan & Maelyn Jarmon	"Angel"
23.9	BTS	"Boy with Luv"
23.10	Toby Keith & Dexter Roberts	"That's Country Bro"
23.11	Halsey	"Nightmare"
23.12	Betsy Ade, Celia Babini, Lisa Ramey & Presley Tennant	"Edge of Seventeen"
23.13	Hootie & the Blowfish & Gyth Rigdon	"Hold My Hand"
23.14	Taylor Swift & Brendon Urie	"Me!"

== Elimination chart ==
=== Color key ===
Artists' info

- Team Adam
- Team Legend
- Team Kelly
- Team Blake
- Comeback Stage Artist

Results' details

- Winner
- Runner-up
- Third place
- Fourth place
- Saved by Instant Save (via Twitter)
- Saved by the public
- Saved by his/her coach
- Stolen by another coach
- Artist won the Comeback Stage (via Twitter) and joined another team
- Selected to participate in the Comeback Stage
- Eliminated
- Teams are in 3 artists
- No artists remaining on his/her team

=== Overall ===
Live shows results per week
Artists	Cross Battles		Week 3 Playoffs	Week 4	Week 5	Week 6 Finale
Artists	Week 1	Week 2	Week 3 Playoffs	Week 4	Week 5	Week 6 Finale
Maelyn Jarmon	Safe		Safe	Safe	Safe	Winner
Gyth Rigdon		Safe	Safe	Safe	Safe	Runner-up
Dexter Roberts	Safe		Safe	Safe	Safe	3rd place
Andrew Sevener		Safe	Safe	Safe	Safe	4th place
Shawn Sounds		Safe	Safe	Safe	Eliminated	Eliminated (Week 5)
Rod Stokes	Stolen from Adam		Safe	Safe	Eliminated	Eliminated (Week 5)
Kim Cherry	Safe		Safe	Safe	Eliminated	Eliminated (Week 5)
Carter Lloyd Horne		Safe	Safe	Safe	Eliminated	Eliminated (Week 5)
LB Crew		Second Chance	Safe	Eliminated	Eliminated (Week 4)	
Mari	Safe		Safe	Eliminated	Eliminated (Week 4)	
Jej Vinson		Safe	Safe	Eliminated	Eliminated (Week 4)	
Oliv Blu	Safe		Safe	Eliminated	Eliminated (Week 4)	
Celia Babini	Stolen from Adam		Safe	Eliminated	Eliminated (Week 4)	
Betsy Ade	Stolen from Kelly		Eliminated	Eliminated (Week 3)		
Kendra Checketts		Stolen from Adam	Eliminated	Eliminated (Week 3)		
Domenic Haynes	Safe		Eliminated	Eliminated (Week 3)		
Rebecca Howell		Safe	Eliminated	Eliminated (Week 3)		
Kalvin Jarvis		Safe	Eliminated	Eliminated (Week 3)		
Matthew Johnson	Safe		Eliminated	Eliminated (Week 3)		
Abby Kasch		Safe	Eliminated	Eliminated (Week 3)		
Jacob Maxwell		Safe	Eliminated	Eliminated (Week 3)		
Jimmy Mowery		Safe	Eliminated	Eliminated (Week 3)		
Lisa Ramey	Safe		Eliminated	Eliminated (Week 3)		
Selkii	Safe		Eliminated	Eliminated (Week 3)		
Presley Tennant	Safe		Eliminated	Eliminated (Week 3)		
Kanard Thomas	Comeback Stage		Eliminated	Eliminated (Week 3)		
The Bundys		Eliminated	Eliminated (Week 2)			
Julian King		Eliminated	Eliminated (Week 2)			
Beth Griffith-Manley		Eliminated	Eliminated (Week 2)			
Karly Moreno		Eliminated	Eliminated (Week 2)			
Karen Galera	Eliminated	Eliminated (Week 1)				
Andrew Jannakos	Eliminated	Eliminated (Week 1)				
Kayslin Victoria	Eliminated	Eliminated (Week 1)				

=== Per team ===
Live shows results per week ( Number of performances reached Top 10 on iTunes)
Artists	Cross Battles		Week 3 Playoffs	Week 4	Week 5	Week 6 Finale
Artists	Week 1	Week 2	Week 3 Playoffs	Week 4	Week 5	Week 6 Finale
LB Crew		Second Chance	Public's vote	Eliminated		
Mari	Public's vote		Coach's choice	Eliminated		
Betsy Ade	Team Kelly		Eliminated			
Domenic Haynes	Coach's save		Eliminated			
Kalvin Jarvis		Public's vote	Eliminated			
Kendra Checketts		Stolen by Blake				
Celia Babini	Stolen by John					
Rod Stokes	Stolen by Kelly					
Andrew Jannakos	Eliminated					
Maelyn Jarmon	Public's vote		Public's vote	Advanced	Advanced	Winner
Shawn Sounds		Public's vote	Public's vote	Advanced	Eliminated	
Celia Babini	Team Adam		Coach's choice	Eliminated		
Jacob Maxwell		Coach's save	Eliminated			
Jimmy Mowery		Public's vote	Eliminated			
Lisa Ramey	Public's vote		Eliminated			
Julian King		Eliminated				
Beth Griffith-Manley		Eliminated				
Kayslin Victoria	Eliminated					
Rod Stokes	Team Adam		Public's vote	Advanced	Eliminated	
Jej Vinson		Public's vote	Coach's choice	Eliminated		
Rebecca Howell		Public's vote	Eliminated			
Matthew Johnson	Public's vote		Eliminated			
Abby Kasch		Coach's save	Eliminated			
Presley Tennant	Public's vote		Eliminated			
The Bundys		Eliminated				
Betsy Ade	Stolen by Adam					
Karen Galera	Eliminated					
Gyth Rigdon		Public's vote	Public's vote	Advanced	Advanced	Runner-up
Dexter Roberts	Public's vote		Public's vote	Advanced	Advanced	Third place
Andrew Sevener		Public's vote	Public's vote	Advanced	Advanced	Fourth place
Kim Cherry	Public's vote		Public's vote	Advanced	Eliminated	
Carter Lloyd Horne		Public's vote	Public's vote	Advanced	Eliminated	
Oliv Blu	Public's vote		Coach's choice	Eliminated		
Kendra Checketts		Team Adam	Eliminated			
Selkii	Coach's save		Eliminated			
Karly Moreno		Eliminated				

Rank	Coach	Top 32	Top 24	Top 13	Top 10	Top 8	Top 6	Top 4
1	John Legend	8	6	3	2	2	2	1
2	Blake Shelton	8	8	6	5	5	3	3
3	Kelly Clarkson	8	6	2	1	1	1	0
4	Adam Levine	8	4	2	2	0	0	0

== Ratings ==
Episode		Original air date	Production	Time slot (ET)	Viewers (in millions)	Adults (18–49)		Source
Episode		Original air date	Production	Time slot (ET)	Viewers (in millions)	Rating	Share	Source
1	"The Blind Auditions Premiere, Part 1"	February 25, 2019	1601	Monday 8:00 p.m.	10.77	2.1	9	
2	"The Blind Auditions Premiere, Part 2"	February 26, 2019	1602	Tuesday 8:00 p.m.	10.60	2.0	10	
3	"The Blind Auditions, Part 3"	March 4, 2019	1603	Monday 8:00 p.m.	10.97	2.1	9	
4	"The Blind Auditions, Part 4"	March 5, 2019	1604	Tuesday 8:00 p.m.	10.22	1.9	9	
5	"The Blind Auditions, Part 5"	March 11, 2019	1605	Monday 8:00 p.m.	10.54	2.0	8	
6	"The Blind Auditions, Part 6"	March 18, 2019	1606	Monday 8:00 p.m.	9.87	1.7	8	
7	"The Best of the Blind Auditions"	March 20, 2019	1607	Wednesday 8:00 p.m.	6.11	1.0	5	
8	"The Battles Premiere, Part 1"	March 25, 2019	1608	Monday 8:00 p.m.	9.00	1.6	8	
9	"The Battles, Part 2"	April 1, 2019	1609	Monday 8:00 p.m.	8.51	1.5	7	
10	"The Battles, Part 3"	April 8, 2019	1610	Monday 8:00 p.m.	7.62	1.2	5	
11	"The Battles, Part 4"	April 9, 2019	1611	Tuesday 8:00 p.m.	7.31	1.2	6	
12	"Live Cross Battles, Part 1"	April 15, 2019	1612	Monday 8:00 p.m.	7.65	1.3	6	
13	"Live Cross Battles, Part 1, Results"	April 16, 2019	1613	Tuesday 8:00 p.m.	7.18	1.0	5	
14	"Live Cross Battles, Part 2"	April 22, 2019	1614	Monday 8:00 p.m.	7.59	1.2	6	
15	"Live Cross Battles, Part 2, Results"	April 23, 2019	1615	Tuesday 9:00 p.m.	6.32	0.9	4	
16	"Live Top 24 Performance"	April 29, 2019	1616	Monday 8:00 p.m.	7.24	1.2	6	
17	"Live Top 24 Results"	April 30, 2019	1617	Tuesday 9:00 p.m.	6.33	0.9	4	
18	"Live Top 13 Performance"	May 6, 2019	1618	Monday 8:00 p.m.	7.27	1.1	5	
19	"Live Top 13 Results"	May 7, 2019	1619	Tuesday 9:00 p.m.	6.20	0.9	4	
20	"Live Top 8 Semifinals Performance"	May 13, 2019	1620	Monday 8:00 p.m.	7.69	1.1	5	
21	"Live Top 8 Semifinals Results"	May 14, 2019	1621	Tuesday 9:00 p.m.	6.56	1.0	4	
22	"Live Finale Performance"	May 20, 2019	1622	Monday 8:00 p.m.	7.96	1.2	5	
23	"Live Finale Results"	May 21, 2019	1623	Tuesday 9:00 p.m.	7.42	1.1	5	
