= Blake Shelton's Barn & Grill =

Studio album by Blake Shelton
- Released: October 26, 2004
- Studio: Emerald Sound Studios and Cool Tools Audio (Nashville, Tennessee).
- Genre: Country
- Length: 34:55
- Label: Warner Bros. Nashville
- Producer: Bobby Braddock

Blake Shelton chronology
The Dreamer (2003)	Blake Shelton's Barn & Grill (2004)	Pure BS (2007)

Singles from Blake Shelton's Barn & Grill
- 1. "When Somebody Knows You That Well" Released: 2004; 2. "Some Beach" Released: August 2, 2004; 3. "Goodbye Time" Released: January 24, 2005; 4. "Nobody but Me" Released: August 30, 2005

Professional ratings
Review scores
Source	Rating
Allmusic	4/5 stars

Blake Shelton's Barn & Grill is the third studio album by American country music artist Blake Shelton. Released in 2004 on Warner Bros. Records Nashville, it is his second album to achieve RIAA platinum certification. The album has four singles, "When Somebody Knows You That Well", "Some Beach", "Goodbye Time" and "Nobody but Me." Like on his previous album, he co-wrote two songs.

== Content ==
The album's lead-off single, "When Somebody Knows You That Well", was co-written by Harley Allen, who had also co-written Shelton's 2003 single "The Baby". "When Somebody Knows You That Well" peaked at number 37 on the Billboard charts, becoming the lowest-charting single of his career. Following this song was Shelton's third Number One hit, "Some Beach", which spent four weeks at Number One in late 2004—early 2005. After this song came a cover of Conway Twitty's 1988 hit "Goodbye Time", with which Shelton reached number 10, and finally, the number 4 "Nobody but Me".

"Cotton Pickin' Time", one of two Paul Overstreet co-writes on this album, was previously a number 34 country hit in 1989 for The Marcy Brothers from their debut album Missing You, and "What's on My Mind" was previously recorded by Gary Allan on his 2001 album Alright Guy. "I Drink" was originally recorded by Mary Gauthier, who co-wrote the song. Gauthier released the song on her 1999 album Drag Queens in Limousines.

An actual neon sign was made and photographed for the album cover. In 2014, Shelton said that he had been given the sign and had it displayed in his house.

== Track listing ==
No.	Title	Writer(s)	Length
1.	"Some Beach"	Rory Feek, Paul Overstreet	3:24
2.	"Nobody but Me"	Shawn Camp, Phillip White	2:38
3.	"Good Old Boy, Bad Old Boyfriend"	Bobby Braddock	3:03
4.	"Love Gets in the Way"	Blake Shelton, Scott Joyce	3:30
5.	"Goodbye Time"	James Dean Hicks, Roger Murrah	3:23
6.	"Cotton Pickin' Time"	Overstreet, Even Stevens	3:16
7.	"What's on My Mind"	Leslie Satcher, Jim Lauderdale	3:05
8.	"When Somebody Knows You That Well"	Jimmy Melton, Harley Allen	3:41
9.	"On a Good Day"	Shelton, Tom Shapiro, Tony Martin	3:34
10.	"The Bartender"	Allen	3:16
11.	"I Drink"	Mary Gauthier, Crit Harmon	3:25
Total length:			34:55

== Personnel ==
Compiled from liner notes.

- Blake Shelton – lead vocals, acoustic guitar (1, 9)
- Gordon Mote – acoustic piano (2, 4, 5)
- Tim Lauer – Hammond B3 organ (2–11), Wurlitzer electric piano "left hand" (3), keyboards (8), string arrangements and conductor (8)
- Bobby Braddock – Minimoog (3), Wurlitzer electric piano "right hand" (3), synthesizer interlude on fadeout (4), string arrangements (8)
- Scott Joyce – additional keyboards (4)
- Mike Rojas – acoustic piano (6–11)
- Brent Rowan – electric guitars, bass (1, 3)
- Bryan Sutton – acoustic guitar (2, 4–7, 9), 5-string banjo (4)
- Byrd Burton – acoustic guitar (3)
- Frank DeBretti Jr. – slide guitar (6)
- John Willis – acoustic guitar (8, 10, 11)
- Paul Franklin – steel guitar (1, 2, 4, 5, 7–11), lap steel guitar (6)
- Sonny Garrish – steel guitar (3)
- Alison Prestwood – bass (2, 4, 5, 8–11)
- Glenn Worf – bass (6, 7)
- Shannon Forrest – drums
- Ed Seay – additional crash cymbals (1, 3)
- Shawn Simpson – shaker (1)
- Terry McMillan — harmonica (6), Jew's harp (6), wolf whistle (6)
- Jonathan Yudkin – fiddle (1, 6, 7), backing fiddle (3), cello (2, 5), viola (2, 5), violin (2)
- Rob Hajacos – solo fiddles (3), fiddle (4, 8–11)
- Carole Rabinowitz – cello (8)
- Kristin Wilkinson – viola (8)
- David Davidson – violin (5, 8)
- David Angell – violin (8)
- Conni Ellisor – violin (8)
- Michael Goode – music copyist (8)
- Carl Jackson – backing vocals (1)
- Leslie Satcher – backing vocals (1)
- Melodie Crittenden – backing vocals (2, 4, 5, 6, 8, 9, 11)
- Blue Miller – backing vocals (2), harmony vocals (3, 4)
- Danny Myrick – backing vocals (4, 9)
- Dennis Wilson – backing vocals (4, 5, 8, 9, 11)
- Wes Hightower – backing vocals (5, 8, 11)
- John Wesley Ryles – backing vocals (5, 8), harmony vocals (10)
- Paul Overstreet – backing vocals (6)
- Curtis Young – harmony vocals (7)
- Rachel Proctor – harmony vocals (11)

== Production ==
- Bobby Braddock — producer
- Ed Seay – engineer, mixing, additional engineer
- Scott Kidd – assistant engineer
- Greg Lawrence – assistant engineer
- Hank Williams – mastering at MasterMix (Nashville)
- Milly Catignangi – production coordinator
- Katya Karagadayeva – album design
- Jim "Señor" McGuire – photography
- Michael McCall – hair grooming
- Libby Mitchell – stylist
- John Dorris – management
- Hallmark Direction – management

== Chart performance ==
=== Weekly charts ===
Chart (2004)	Peak position
US Billboard 200	20
US Top Country Albums (Billboard)	3

=== Year-end charts ===
Chart (2005)	Position
US Billboard 200	143
US Top Country Albums (Billboard)	22
Chart (2006)	Position
US Top Country Albums (Billboard)	65

=== Singles ===
Year	Single	Peak chart positions	
Year	Single	US Country	US
2004	"When Somebody Knows You That Well"	37	—
2004	"Some Beach"	1	28
2005	"Goodbye Time"	10	73
2005	"Nobody but Me"	4	60
"—" denotes releases that did not chart

== Certifications ==
Region	Certification	Certified units/sales
United States (RIAA)	Platinum	1,000,000^{‡}
^{‡} Sales+streaming figures based on certification alone.
