= Ol' Red =

Song by George Jones

Song by George Jones

from the album You Oughta Be Here with Me
- Released: August 1990
- Genre: Country
- Length: 3:29
- Label: Epic
- Songwriters: James "Bo" Bohon; Don Goodman; Mark Sherrill
- Producer: Billy Sherrill

"Ol' Red"

Single by Kenny Rogers

from the album If Only My Heart Had a Voice
- Released: August 1993
- Recorded: 1992–1993
- Genre: Country
- Length: 3:09
- Label: Giant
- Songwriters: James "Bo" Bohon; Don Goodman; Mark Sherrill
- Producers: Larry Butler, James Stroud

Kenny Rogers singles chronology
"Missing You" (1993)	"Ol' Red" (1993)	"Sing Me Your Love Song" (1997)

"Ol' Red" is a song written by James "Bo" Bohon, Don Goodman, and Mark Sherrill. The song was originally recorded by George Jones on his 1990 album You Oughta Be Here with Me and covered by Kenny Rogers on his 1993 album If Only My Heart Had a Voice. Rogers' version was released as a single in August 1993. It was later recorded by Blake Shelton, and his version of the song was released in March 2002 as the third and final single from his self-titled debut album. Shelton's rendition was also a Top 20 hit on the US Billboard Hot Country Songs chart, having peaked at number 14.

== Content ==
The narrator is a prisoner serving a 99-year term on a prison farm in southern Georgia for committing a crime of domestic violence after catching his wife in an affair with another man, presumably killing one or both of them. Twelve years into his sentence (two years in the Blake Shelton version), he ingratiates himself with the warden and is assigned to tend Ol' Red, the warden's prized bloodhound who helps catch escapees. The warden, in fact, dares the prisoners to try to escape, but none have ever succeeded. Ol' Red can smell a trail up to two days old, and the prison is surrounded by quicksand and alligators.

The narrator bribes a guard to let him send a letter to a cousin in Tennessee, who brings in a female Bluetick Coonhound and pens her in a swamp just south of the prison. When the narrator takes Ol' Red for his daily exercise run, he passes by the swamp, hoping Ol' Red and the Bluetick will mate. Once they start doing so consistently, the narrator intentionally keeps the dogs apart for several days, then escapes from the prison one evening and heads north toward Tennessee. When the warden turns Ol' Red loose, though, he is so eager to mate with the Bluetick that he runs south toward her pen and completely ignores the narrator's escape. Some time later, the two dogs have bred litters of "red-haired Blueticks" all over the American South, and the narrator muses, "Love got me in here and love got me out."

== Kenny Rogers version ==
In August 1993, Country superstar Kenny Rogers recorded a version of the song and included it on his album If Only My Heart Had a Voice under the Giant Records label.

== Blake Shelton version ==
"Ol' Red"

Single by Blake Shelton

from the album Blake Shelton
- Released: March 18, 2002
- Recorded: 2001
- Genre: Country
- Length: 3:42
- Label: Warner Bros. Nashville
- Songwriters: James "Bo" Bohon; Don Goodman; Mark Sherril
- Producer: Bobby Braddock

Blake Shelton singles chronology
"All Over Me" (2001)	"Ol' Red" (2002)	"The Baby" (2002)

Blake Shelton recorded a version of the song and included it on his self-titled debut album, released in 2001, and was released as the third and final single from the album in March 2002. It also features backing vocals from Rachel Proctor. Although it did not reach the Top 10 on the U.S. country charts, "Ol' Red" is one of Shelton's most commonly requested songs in concert (as well as one of his best-known hits). As a direct result, he considers it his signature song.

=== Music video ===
The music video was directed by Peter Zavadil. It features a cameo by NASCAR driver Elliott Sadler (as his cousin), Bobby Braddock (as a prison inmate), who produced Shelton's version, and Kirsti Manna (who co-wrote Blake's previous hit "Austin", as Blake's bailiff). It was filmed at the Tennessee State Prison. Many of the cameos would later have a part in Blake's 2004 "Some Beach" video, also directed by Zavadil.

=== Chart performance ===
"Ol' Red" debuted at number 60 on the U.S. Billboard Hot Country Singles & Tracks for the week of March 30, 2002.

Chart (2002)	Peak position
US Bubbling Under Hot 100 (Billboard)	1
US Hot Country Songs (Billboard)	14

==== Year-end charts ====
Chart (2002)	Position
US Country Songs (Billboard)	49

=== Certifications ===
Region	Certification	Certified units/sales
United States (RIAA)	2× Platinum	2,000,000^{‡}
^{‡} Sales+streaming figures based on certification alone.

=== Merchandising ===
Shelton, in partnership with Ryman Hospitality Properties, operates a chain of restaurants with the name "Ole Red" in Tishomingo, Oklahoma; Gatlinburg, Tennessee; Orlando, Florida, Las Vegas, Nevada; and Nashville, Tennessee's lower Broadway area.
