= If Only My Heart Had a Voice =

Studio album by Kenny Rogers
- Released: 1993
- Recorded: 1992–1993
- Studio: Eleven Eleven Studio, Sound Stage Studios, Soundshop Recording Studios, Sixteenth Avenue Sound and Masterfonics (Nashville, Tennessee); The Castle (Franklin, Tennessee); Mesa Recording (Sebastapol, California)
- Genre: Country
- Length: 34:08
- Label: Giant
- Producer: Larry Butler; James Stroud

Kenny Rogers chronology
Back Home Again (1991)	If Only My Heart Had a Voice (1993)	Timepiece (1994)

If Only My Heart Had a Voice is the twenty-fifth studio album by country music artist Kenny Rogers released in 1993 by Giant Records. It was Rogers' first album not to chart since 1976. The album includes the singles "Missing You", "Ol' Red" and "Wanderin' Man".

== Content ==
"Ol' Red" was also recorded by George Jones on his 1990 album You Oughta Be Here with Me, and would later be a Top 20 hit in 2002 for Blake Shelton from his self-titled debut. "If I Were You", recorded here as a duet with Travis Tritt, was originally cut by The Oak Ridge Boys on their 1991 album Unstoppable, and would later be recorded by Chad Brock as a duet with Mark Wills on Brock's 2000 album Yes!

== Critical reception ==
Rob Theakston of Allmusic rated the album 2.5 out of 5 stars, saying that "there are some moments on here that die-hard fans will enjoy". He thought that the production had "aged well" and that the songs were "surprisingly consistent."

== Track listing ==
No.	Title	Writer(s)	Length
1.	"Fightin' for the Same Thing"	Chuck Jones, Tom Shapiro	3:13
2.	"Missing You"	Rick Giles, Susan Longacre	3:14
3.	"She Waits"	Tom French, Tom Paden	3:10
4.	"Ol' Red"	James "Bo" Bohan, Don Goodman, Mark Sherrill	3:07
5.	"If I Were You" (duet with Travis Tritt)	Billy Dean, Verlon Thompson	3:08
6.	"Wanderin' Man"	Kim Carnes, Colin Ellingson	3:53
7.	"Reason to Go"	Debbie Hupp, Tim Mensy	3:55
8.	"If You Were the Friend"	Hupp, Mensy	3:40
9.	"If Only My Heart Had a Voice"	Rick Bowles, Skip Ewing, Kenny Rogers	3:35
10.	"Somebody's Wrong Somebody's Right"	Larry Butler	3:13

== Personnel ==
- Kenny Rogers – lead vocals, backing vocals
- Larry Butler – keyboards, synthesizers
- Gene Golden – keyboards, synthesizers
- Mike Lawler – keyboards, synthesizers
- Steve Glassmeyer – acoustic piano
- Warren Hartman – Hammond B3 organ
- Randy McCormick – acoustic piano
- Bobby Ogdin – acoustic piano
- Gary Prim – acoustic piano (6)
- Porter Howell – electric guitar (1)
- Chuck Jones – acoustic guitar (1)
- Larry Byrom – acoustic guitar, electric guitar
- Randy Dorman – electric guitar
- Steve Gibson – electric guitar
- Rick Harper – electric guitar (4)
- Dann Huff – electric guitar
- Chris Leuzinger – acoustic guitar, electric guitar, electric sitar
- Tim Mensy – acoustic guitar
- Brent Rowan – electric guitar
- Biff Watson – acoustic guitar, mandolin
- Sonny Garrish – steel guitar, pedalbro
- Weldon Myrick – steel guitar, pedalbro
- Jimmy Carter – bass
- Joe Chemay – bass
- Chuck Jacobs – bass
- Dave Pomeroy – bass
- Glenn Worf – bass
- Bob Wray – bass
- Lynn Hammann – drums
- Nigel Olsson – drums, percussion
- James Stroud – drums, percussion
- Lonnie Wilson – drums
- Paul Leim – drums (6)
- Joe Spivey – fiddle
- Carl Gorodetzky – string arrangements and conductor
- The Nashville String Machine – strings
- Jana King – backing vocals
- Curtis Wright – backing vocals
- Curtis Young – backing vocals
- Travis Tritt – lead vocals (5)

== Production ==
- Larry Butler – producer
- James Stroud – producer
- Julian King – recording, assistant engineer
- Lynn Peterzell – recording, mixing
- Billy Sherrill – recording
- Derek Bason – assistant engineer
- Mark Capps – assistant engineer
- David Hall – assistant engineer
- John Hurley – assistant engineer
- Graham Lewis – assistant engineer
- Darren Smith – assistant engineer
- Glenn Meadows – mastering at Masterfonics
- Schanda Butler – production assistant
- Kelly Giedt – production assistant
- Laura LiPuma Nash – art direction
- Beth Middleworth – design
- Peter Nash – photography
- Ken Kragen at Kragen & Co. – management
- C.K. Spurlock – booking
