= Playboys of the Southwestern World =

Single by Blake Shelton

from the album The Dreamer
- B-side: "Ol' Red"
- Released: July 12, 2003
- Genre: Country
- Length: 4:28
- Label: Warner Bros. Nashville
- Songwriter(s): Neal Coty, Randy VanWarmer
- Producer(s): Bobby Braddock

Blake Shelton singles chronology
"Heavy Liftin'" (2003)	"Playboys of the Southwestern World" (2003)	"When Somebody Knows You That Well" (2004)

"Playboys of the Southwestern World" is a song written by Neal Coty and Randy VanWarmer and recorded by American country music artist Blake Shelton. It was released in July 2003 as the third single from Shelton's album The Dreamer. The song reached number 24 on the US Billboard Hot Country Singles & Tracks chart.

== Content ==
The narrator (Romeo) and his wild-child neighbor and childhood friend, John Roy, are two teens who enroll in a small Texas college. John Roy decides from a young age that he and Romeo should go down to Mexico to pick up girls and party. The two enter Mexico but are detained by a border guard, who suspects illegal activity due to their possession of cash in United States dollars, and threatens them with "ten years in a Mexican jail." Since a "pocket full" of cash in a tourist's home currency is normally not reasonable grounds to suspect a crime, the song lyrics that compare the event to Paul McCartney's arrest in Japan for may be a hint that they had other items in their possession. Romeo, in a desperate attempt at self-preservation, blames John Roy for everything; the attempt fails, and both end up as "temporary cellmates." Both remain best friends after the ordeal.

The chorus quotes a portion of Van Morrison's "Brown Eyed Girl", as well as interpolating the "sha-la-la-la" vocal.

== Chart performance ==
Chart (2003)	Peak position
US Hot Country Songs (Billboard)	24
