= Blake Shelton (album) =

Studio album by Blake Shelton
- Released: July 31, 2001
- Recorded: 2001
- Genre: Neotraditional Country
- Length: 34:10
- Label: Warner Bros. Nashville
- Producer: Bobby Braddock

Blake Shelton chronology
Blake Shelton (2001)	The Dreamer (2003)

Singles from Blake Shelton
- 1. "Austin" Released: April 16, 2001; 2. "All Over Me" Released: October 15, 2001; 3. "Ol' Red" Released: March 18, 2002

Professional ratings
Review scores
Source	Rating
Allmusic	4/5 stars

Blake Shelton is the debut studio album by American country music artist Blake Shelton. It was released on July 31, 2001, through Warner Bros. Records Nashville. The album features three singles: "Austin", "All Over Me", and "Ol' Red". It has been certified platinum by the Recording Industry Association of America (RIAA). Shelton co-wrote four of the ten tracks.

== Singles ==
"Austin" was the lead-off single from the album, reaching number one on the Billboard Hot Country Singles & Tracks (now Hot Country Songs) charts that year. Although Shelton has since charted five more number ones, "Austin" is his longest-lasting number one hit, at five weeks. Following this song was "All Over Me", which reached number 18 on the country charts, and "Ol' Red", which peaked at number 14. The latter was originally recorded by George Jones on his 1990 album You Oughta Be Here with Me, and by Kenny Rogers on his 1993 album If Only My Heart Had a Voice. Due to the closure of Giant Records in 2001, Shelton was transferred to the Nashville division of Giant's parent label, Warner Bros. Records, which promoted and distributed the second and third singles.

== Critical reception ==
Maria Konicki Dinoia of Allmusic rated the album four stars out of five, saying, "This impressive ten-song compilation is an earnest debut full of lots of promise and originality" and citing the presence of Bobby Braddock cowrites.

== Track listing ==
No.	Title	Writer(s)	Length
1.	"Every Time I Look at You"	Blake Shelton; Doug Johnson	2:57
2.	"All Over Me"	Shelton; Earl Thomas Conley; Mike Pyle	3:14
3.	"She Doesn't Know She's Got It"	John Rich; Chris Waters; Tom Shapiro	3:18
4.	"Austin"	Kirsti Manna; David Kent	3:50
5.	"Ol' Red"	James "Bo" Bohan; Don Goodman; Mark Sherrill	3:42
6.	"I Thought There Was Time"	Bobby Braddock	3:24
7.	"Same Old Song"	B. Braddock	3:50
8.	"That's What I Call Home"	Shelton; Richard Mainegra; Michael Kosser	3:17
9.	"Problems at Home"	Shelton; Billy Montana; Don Ellis	4:00
10.	"If I Was Your Man"	Lauren Braddock; Don Henry	3:39
Total length:			34:10

== Personnel ==
Compiled from liner notes.

Musicians

- Bobby Braddock – synthesizer strings
- Alison Brown – 5-string banjo
- Chad Cromwell – drums
- Dan Dugmore – pedal steel guitar, lap steel guitar, dobro
- Shannon Forrest – drums, percussion
- Steve Gibson – sitar
- Rob Hajacos – fiddle
- Tim Lauer – accordion, keyboards, organ, piano, synthesizer
- Terry McMillan – harmonica, Jew's harp
- Alison Prestwood – bass guitar
- Mike Rojas – piano
- Brent Rowan – electric guitar, sitar
- Scotty Sanders – lap steel guitar, slide guitar, banjo
- Blake Shelton - lead vocals
- John Willis – acoustic guitar
- Jonathan Yudkin – fiddle, mandolin
- Andrea Zonn – fiddle

Background vocals

- Deborah Allen – "Problems at Home"
- Greg Barnhill – "Every Time I Look at You", "If I Was Your Man"
- Richard Mainegra – "I Thought There Was Time", "That's What I Call Home"
- Rachel Proctor – "Ol' Red"
- Dennis Wilson – "All Over Me", "She Doesn't Know She's Got It", "Austin", "Ol' Red", "I Thought There Was Time", "Same Old Song"
- Curtis Young – "Every Time I Look at You", "Problems at Home", "If I Was Your Man"

String section

- David Greer,^{[B]} David Davidson,^{[A][B]} David Angell,^{[A][B]} Conni Ellisor,^{[A]} Pam Sixfin,^{[A]} Mary Katherin VanOsdale^{[A]} – violin
- Kris Wilkinson,^{[A][B]} Jim Grosjean,^{[A]} Monisa Angell^{[B]} – viola
- John Catchings,^{[A]} Anthony LaMarchina^{[A][B][C]} – cello
- A on "All Over Me" and "Problems at Home"
- B on "Austin"
- C on "Ol' Red"

Strings arranged by Bobby Braddock and Tim Lauer, conducted by Tim Lauer.

Technical

- Janice Azrak – art director
- Bobby Braddock – producer
- Señor McGuire – photography
- Denny Purcell – mastering
- Ed Seay – mixing
- Jim Shea – photography

== Chart performance ==
=== Weekly charts ===
Chart (2001)	Peak position
US Billboard 200	45
US Top Country Albums (Billboard)	3

=== Year-end charts ===
Chart (2001)	Position
US Top Country Albums (Billboard)	44
Chart (2002)	Position
US Top Country Albums (Billboard)	31

=== Singles ===
Year	Single	Peak chart positions	
Year	Single	US Country	US
2001	"Austin"	1	18
2001	"All Over Me"	18	110
2002	"Ol' Red"	14	101

== Certifications ==
Region	Certification	Certified units/sales
United States (RIAA)	Platinum	1,000,000^{^}
^{^} Shipments figures based on certification alone.
