= Don't Make Me =

Single by Blake Shelton

from the album Pure BS
- Released: November 6, 2006
- Genre: Country
- Length: 4:07
- Label: Warner Bros. Nashville
- Songwriters: Marla Cannon-Goodman, Deanna Bryant, Dave Berg
- Producer: Brent Rowan

Blake Shelton singles chronology
| "Nobody but Me" (2005) | "Don't Make Me" (2006) | "The More I Drink" (2007) |

"Don't Make Me" is a song recorded by American country music singer Blake Shelton. It was released in November 2006 as the first single from his album, Pure BS. It was written by Marla Cannon-Goodman, Deanna Bryant, and Dave Berg.

== Content ==
This song is about a man who notices a change in his girlfriend's behavior and is begging for the relationship to be righted. He tells her that he doesn't want to leave, but if that's what it comes to, he will and he won't be back.

== Music video ==
The music video was directed by Roman White and premiered on CMT on November 16, 2006.

== Chart performance ==
The song debuted at #60 on the Hot Country Songs chart dated November 11, 2006. It spent 31 weeks on that chart, and peaked at #12 on the chart dated June 9, 2007, in addition to peaking at #79 on the Billboard Hot 100.

| Chart (2006–2007) | Peak position |
|---|---|
| Canada Country (Billboard) | 34 |
| US Billboard Hot 100 | 79 |
| US Hot Country Songs (Billboard) | 12 |

=== Year-end charts ===
| Chart (2007) | Position |
|---|---|
| US Country Songs (Billboard) | 58 |
