= Timepiece (album) =

Studio album by Kenny Rogers
- Released: September 1994
- Recorded: 1994
- Studio: Chartmaker Studios (Malibu, California); Ocean Way Recording (Hollywood, California); Bill Schnee Studios (North Hollywood, California); Record Plant, Studio Ultimo and Record One (Los Angeles, California); Rumbo Recorders (Canoga Park, California)
- Genre: Pop
- Length: 51:48
- Label: 143 / Atlantic
- Producer: David Foster

Kenny Rogers chronology
If Only My Heart Had A Voice (1993)	Timepiece (1994)	The Gift (1996)

Timepiece is the twenty-sixth studio album by country music artist Kenny Rogers, released in 1994 by 143/Atlantic Records. An album of 1930s and 1940s jazz standards, it was produced by David Foster. The album did not chart.

== Track listing ==
No.	Title	Lyrics	Music	Length
1.	"I Remember You"	Johnny Mercer	Victor Schertzinger	5:08
2.	"But Beautiful"	Johnny Burke	Jimmy Van Heusen	5:00
3.	"When I Fall in Love"	Edward Heyman	Victor Young	4:15
4.	"Love Is Here to Stay"	Ira Gershwin	George Gershwin	2:56
5.	"The Nearness of You"	Ned Washington	Hoagy Carmichael	4:36
6.	"My Funny Valentine"	Lorenz Hart	Richard Rodgers	4:52
7.	"Love Is Just Around the Corner"	Leo Robin	Lewis E. Gensler	2:28
8.	"Where or When"	Lorenz Hart	Richard Rodgers	4:15
9.	"My Romance"	Lorenz Hart	Richard Rodgers	5:03
10.	"In the Wee Small Hours of the Morning"	Bob Hilliard	David Mann	4:10
11.	"I Get Along Without You Very Well"	Hoagy Carmichael	Hoagy Carmichael	5:40
12.	"You Are So Beautiful"	Bruce Fisher, Billy Preston	Bruce Fisher, Billy Preston	3:25

== Personnel ==
Musicians

- Kenny Rogers – vocals
- Mike Melvoin – acoustic piano
- Terry Trotter – acoustic piano
- Randy Waldman – acoustic piano, synthesizers, synth harmonica (3), arrangements (7)
- Claude Gaudette – synthesizers, drum programming
- David Foster – arrangements (7), keyboards (12)
- John Chiodini – guitars
- John Pisano – guitars
- Chuck Domanico – bass
- John Patitucci – bass
- John Guerin – drums
- Jeff Hamilton – drums
- Pete Christlieb – tenor sax solo (2, 5, 10)
- Earle Dumler – oboe solo (9)
- Amy Shulman – harp solo (11)
- Take 6 – backing vocals (7)
- Cedric Dent – vocal arrangements (7)
- Mark Kibble – vocal arrangements (7)

Orchestra

- Johnny Mandel – arrangements (1, 2, 5, 8, 10)
- Edward Karam – conductor (1, 2, 5, 8, 10)
- Jeremy Lubbock – arrangements and conductor (3, 4, 6, 9, 11)
- William Ross – string orchestrations and conductor (12)
- Jules Chaplin, Debbie Datz-Pyle and Patti Zimmitti – orchestra contractors
- Suzie Katayama – supervising copyist
- Joann Kane Music Service – additional music preparation

Brass, Horns and Woodwinds

- Jon Clarke, Pete Christlieb, Louise DiTullio, Earle Dumler, Dominic Fera, Gary Foster, Susan Greenberg, Dan Higgins, Jack Nimitz, Joel Peskin, Marshal Royal, Sheridon Stokes, Bob Tricarico, Jim Walker and Rickey Woodard – woodwinds
- Randy Aldcroft, George Bohanon, Dick Hyde and Dick Nash – trombone
- Rick Baptist, Oscar Brashear, Ron King and Frank Szabo – trumpet
- David Duke, Marni Johnson, Joe Meyer, Diane Muller, Rick Todd and Brad Warnaar – French horn

Strings

- Don Ferrone, Richard Feves, Chris Kollgaard, Frances Lui, Ed Meares, Buell Neidlinger and Margaret Storer – bass
- Vage Ayrikyan, Jodi Burnett, Larry Corbett, Ernie Ehrhardt, Steve Erdody, Christine Ermacoff, Marie Fera, Rowena Hamil, Todd Hemmenway, Paula Hochhalter, Ann Karam, Suzie Katayama, Ray Kelley, Armen Ksajikian, Dane Little, David Low, Miguel Martinez, Steve Richards, Dan Rothmuller, Fred Seykora, David Shamban, Dan Smith and Christina Soule – cello
- Gayle Levant and Amy Shulman – harp
- Marilyn Baker, Bob Becker, Sam Boghossian, Dimitri Bovaird, Ken Burward-Hoy, Rollice Dale, Brian Dembow, Pamela Goldsmith, Steve Gordon, Carrie Holzman-Little, Roland Kato, Margot Maclaine, Dan Neufeld, Mike Nowak, Andrew Picken, Kazi Pitelka, Karie Prescott, Jimbo Ross, Jody Rubin, John Scanlon, Harry Shirinian, David Stenske, Evan Wilson, Hershel Wise and Mihail Zinovyev – viola
- Richard Altenbach, Israel Baker, Arnold Belnick, Dixie Blackstone, Russ Cantor, Ron Clark, Isabelle Daskoff, Joel Derouin, Assa Drori, Bruce Dukov, Henry Ferber, Mike Ferril, Juliann French, Julie Gigante, Joe Goodman, Alan Grunfeld, Diana Halprin, Clayton Haslop, Pat Johnson, Karen Jones, Leslie Katz, Miran Kojian, Razdan Kuyumjian, Brian Leonard, Gordon Marron, Yoko Matsuda, Jayme Miller, Horia Moroaica, Irma Neuman, Robin Olson, Don Palmer, Barbra Porter, Stan Plummer, Rafael Rishik, Gil Romero, Jay Rosen, Bob Sanov, Sheldon Sanov, Marc Sazar, Haim Shtrum, Spiro Stamos, Bob Sushel, Polly Sweeney, Mari Tsumura, Jerry Vinci, Dorothy Wade, Miwako Watanabe, Elizabeth Wilson, Margaret Wooten and Shari Zippert – violin

Percussion

- Larry Bunker and Don Williams

== Production ==
- David Foster – producer
- Johnny Mandel – co-producer (1, 2, 5, 8, 10)
- Jeremy Lubbock – co-producer (3, 4, 6, 9, 11)
- Al Schmitt – engineer, mixing (1–11)
- Humberto Gatica – mixing (12)
- Dave Reitzas – vocal engineer
- Felipe Elgueta – additional engineer, assistant engineer
- Dave Brock – assistant engineer
- Jeff DeMorris – assistant engineer
- Noel Hazen – assistant engineer
- Michael Reiter – assistant engineer
- Rail Rogut – assistant engineer, mix assistant (12)
- Michael Steinbrech – assistant engineer
- John Hendrickson – mix assistant (1–11)
- Doug Sax – mastering at The Mastering Lab (Hollywood, California)
- Jaymes Foster-Levy – album coordinator, cover photo hand painting
- Carrie Chow – art direction
- Cindy Luck – art direction
- Ken Merfeld – photography
- Ken Kragen – management
