= The Dreamer (Blake Shelton album) =

Studio album by Blake Shelton
- Released: February 4, 2003
- Recorded: 2002
- Studios: Sony/Tree Studios, Emerald Sound Studios/"Tracking Room", Cool Tools Audio, Treasure Isle Studios and Blueberry Hill Studios (Nashville, Tennessee).
- Genre: Country
- Length: 36:52
- Label: Warner Bros. Nashville
- Producer: Bobby Braddock

Blake Shelton chronology
Blake Shelton (2001)	The Dreamer (2003)	Blake Shelton's Barn & Grill (2004)

Singles from The Dreamer
- 1. "The Baby" Released: October 28, 2002; 2. "Heavy Liftin'" Released: April 26, 2003; 3. "Playboys of the Southwestern World" Released: July 12, 2003

Professional ratings
Review scores
Source	Rating
Allmusic	3/5 stars

The Dreamer is the second studio album by American country music artist Blake Shelton. Released on February 4, 2003, by Warner Bros. Records Nashville. It features the Number One single "The Baby," as well as the singles "Heavy Liftin'" and "Playboys of the Southwestern World". The Dreamer is certified gold by the Recording Industry Association of America and features staff writers on all but one track.

== Content ==
"The Baby" was the first single from the album. This song spent three weeks at Number One on the Billboard country charts in early 2003, becoming Shelton's second Number One hit. Unlike with his debut album, the second and third singles from The Dreamer did not peak as highly: "Heavy Liftin'" peaked at number 32, and "Playboys of the Southwestern World" at number 24.

"Underneath the Same Moon" was previously recorded by John Rich on his 2000 album of the same name.

"Georgia in a Jug" was previously recorded by Johnny Paycheck on his 1978 album Take This Job and Shove It, and his version was a number 20 country hit that year. "In My Heaven" was previously recorded by Mark Wills on his 2001 album Loving Every Minute.

Shelton's one solo writing credit on the album is for the title track, which is about Shelton's relationship with his then-fiance Kaynette Gern. "My Neck of the Woods" was co-written by Shelton and was inspired by the music of Hank Williams Jr. The lyrics to the song are about the area in Tennessee where Shelton was living at the time. Shelton said about "My Neck of the Woods", "This is a song I begged and begged to have on my first album, but I just couldn't convince the record company. Now I'm glad it didn't make the first album, because I think it fits better on this one."

== Critical reception ==
Robert L. Doerschuk of Allmusic rated the album three stars out of five, saying, "Rough, rawboned energy drives Blake Shelton's sophomore release[…]the problem lies more with the material, which represents the doldrum state of songwriting in music city." Ray Waddell of Billboard thought that the album's variety of material made it "broader than its predecessor", contrasting the "muscular" "Heavy Liftin'" to the "impressive passion" on "The Baby", although he criticized the production of "Asphalt Cowboy".

== Track listing ==
No.	Title	Writer(s)	Length
1.	"Heavy Liftin'"	Boyd Houston Robert; George Teren; Rivers Rutherford	3:26
2.	"The Baby"	Harley Allen; Michael White	3:54
3.	"Asphalt Cowboy"	Jeff Stevens; Kenny West	3:39
4.	"In My Heaven"	Rutherford; Bobby Pinson	3:10
5.	"The Dreamer"	Blake Shelton	3:59
6.	"My Neck of the Woods"	Shelton; Don Ellis; Billy Montana	3:45
7.	"Underneath the Same Moon"	Sharon Vaughn Bellamy; John Rich	3:52
8.	"Georgia in a Jug"	Bobby Braddock	3:06
9.	"Playboys of the Southwestern World"	Randy VanWarmer; Neal Coty	4:28
10.	"Someday"	Braddock; Kathy Locke	3:36
Total length:			36:52

== Personnel ==
As listed in liner notes.

Vocals

- Larry Cordle – backing vocals
- Neal Coty – backing vocals
- Melodie Crittenden – backing vocals
- Wes Hightower – backing vocals
- Blue Miller – backing vocals
- Danny Myrick – backing vocals
- John Rich – backing vocals
- John Wesley Ryles – backing vocals
- Leslie Satcher – backing vocals
- Blake Shelton – lead vocals, backing vocals
- Sharon Vaughn Bellamy – backing vocals
- Dennis Wilson – backing vocals

Musicians

- David Angell – violin
- John Catchings – cello
- Bobby Braddock – keyboards, string arrangements
- David Davidson – violin
- Dan Dugmore – steel guitar
- Shannon Forrest – drums, percussion
- Paul Franklin – steel guitar
- Carl Gorodetzky – violin
- Jim Grosjean – viola
- Rob Hajacos – fiddle
- Anthony LaMarchina – cello
- Tim Lauer – keyboards, string arrangements and conductor
- Charlie McCoy – harmonica, trumpet, vibraphone
- Greg Morrow – drums, percussion
- Carole Neuen-Rabinowitz – cello
- Russ Pahl – banjo
- Alison Prestwood – bass
- Michael Rhodes – bass
- Mike Rojas – keyboards
- Brent Rowan – Wurlitzer electric piano, electric guitars, baritone guitar
- Blake Shelton – acoustic guitar
- Pamela Sixfin – violin
- Donald Teal – violin
- Mary Kathryn Vanosdale – violin
- Kristin Wilkinson – viola
- John Willis – acoustic guitar
- Jonathan Yudkin – mandolin, fiddle

Production

- Janice Arzak – art direction
- Kristin Barlowe – photography
- Bobby Braddock – producer
- Milly Catignani – production coordinator
- Debbie Dover – grooming
- Paul Hart – additional engineer, assistant engineer
- Katherine LePore – stylist
- Paige Levy – A&R
- Tyson Paine - intern, assistant engineer
- Garrett Rittenberry – design
- John Saylor – assistant engineer
- Ed Seay – engineer, mixing
- Hank Williams – mastering at MasterMix (Nashville, Tennessee)

== Chart performance ==
=== Weekly charts ===
Chart (2003)	Peak position
US Billboard 200	8
US Top Country Albums (Billboard)	2

=== Year-end charts ===
Chart (2003)	Position
US Top Country Albums (Billboard)	27

=== Singles ===
Year	Single	Peak chart positions	
Year	Single	US Country	US
2002	"The Baby"	1	28
2003	"Heavy Liftin'"	32	—
2003	"Playboys of the Southwestern World"	24	—
"—" denotes releases that did not chart

== Certifications ==
Region	Certification	Certified units/sales
United States (RIAA)	Gold	500,000^{^}
^{^} Shipments figures based on certification alone.
