= All Over Me (Blake Shelton song) =

Single by Blake Shelton

from the album Blake Shelton
- B-side: "Every Time I Look at You"
- Released: October 15, 2001
- Genre: Country
- Length: 3:15
- Label: Warner Bros. Nashville
- Songwriters: Earl Thomas Conley; Mike Pyle; Blake Shelton
- Producer: Bobby Braddock

Blake Shelton singles chronology
"Austin" (2001)	"All Over Me" (2001)	"Ol' Red" (2002)

"All Over Me" is a song written by Earl Thomas Conley, Michael Pyle, and Blake Shelton. It was released in October 2001 as the second single from Shelton's debut album, Blake Shelton.

Shelton was introduced to Conley by good friend Pyle, who was playing in Conley's band at the time. Shelton has long considered Earl Thomas Conley his all time musical hero. The three wrote the song at Conley's house in 1999.

Shelton sings in a falsetto on the chorus.

== Chart positions ==
"All Over Me" debuted at number 54 on the U.S. Billboard Hot Country Singles & Tracks for the week of October 20, 2001.

Chart (2001)	Peak position
US Bubbling Under Hot 100 (Billboard)	10
US Hot Country Songs (Billboard)	18
