= The More I Drink =

Single by Blake Shelton

from the album Pure BS
- Released: July 3, 2007
- Genre: Country
- Length: 3:37
- Label: Warner Bros. Nashville
- Songwriters: David Lee Murphy, Chris DuBois, Dave Turnbull
- Producer: Brent Rowan

Blake Shelton singles chronology
"Don't Make Me" (2006)	"The More I Drink" (2007)	"Home" (2008)

"The More I Drink" is a song written by David Lee Murphy, Chris DuBois, and Dave Turnbull and recorded by American country music singer Blake Shelton. It was released in July 2007 as the second single from Shelton's album Pure BS.

== Critical reception ==
Ken Tucker, of Billboard magazine in his review of the album, called the song "a honky-tonk, piano-laden ball of fun"

== Music video ==
The music video was directed by Roman White and premiered in mid-2007. It begins with many heavily intoxicated bar patrons getting arrested (including Blake) and getting into a fight. Blake starts the song in a police booking room, before the scene cuts to the bar patrons getting rowdy and drunk at a local bar (which prequels to the video's beginning). After many of the patrons flirt with some scantily-clad women trying to impress themselves, a fight breaks out, and many of the patrons are seen getting injured. Blake is seen performing the song both with his band to an audience, and with the patrons as they prepare for their mugshots. It was filmed in Watertown, Tennessee.

== Chart performance ==
This song debuted at number 57 on the Hot Country Songs chart dated July 7, 2007. It spent 27 weeks on that chart, and peaked at number 19 on the chart dated December 15, 2007. After falling to number 20 the next week, the song climbed back to number 19 on the chart dated December 29, 2007. It also peaked at number 2 on the Bubbling Under Hot 100 chart.

Chart (2007)	Peak position
Canada Country (Billboard)	48
US Bubbling Under Hot 100 (Billboard)	2
US Hot Country Songs (Billboard)	19

== Certifications ==
Region	Certification	Certified units/sales
United States (RIAA)	Gold	500,000^{‡}
^{‡} Sales+streaming figures based on certification alone.
