= Pure BS =

Studio album by Blake Shelton
- Released: May 1, 2007
- Genre: Country
- Length: 40:32
- Label: Warner Bros. Nashville
- Producer: Bobby Braddock; Brent Rowan; Paul Worley

Blake Shelton chronology
Blake Shelton's Barn & Grill (2004)	Pure BS (2007)	Startin' Fires (2008)

Singles from Pure BS
- 1. "Don't Make Me" Released: November 21, 2006; 2. "The More I Drink" Released: July 3, 2007; 3. "Home" Released: February 4, 2008

Professional ratings
Review scores
Source	Rating
Allmusic	4/5 stars
USA Today	3.5/4 stars

Pure BS is the fourth studio album by American country music artist Blake Shelton, released in 2007 on Warner Bros. Records Nashville. It produced the singles "Don't Make Me" and "The More I Drink". The album was re-released in 2008 with three bonus tracks, one of which — a cover of Michael Bublé's "Home" — was released as a single, becoming Shelton's fourth Number One country hit. Of the eleven tracks, Shelton co-wrote three. The album has been certified Gold by RIAA.

== Content ==
Unlike Shelton's first three albums, which were all produced by Bobby Braddock, Pure BS features three different producers: Braddock, as well as Brent Rowan and Paul Worley.

The album's first single was "Don't Make Me", which peaked at number 12 on the Billboard country charts in 2007. Following this was the David Lee Murphy co-write "The More I Drink" which peaked at number 19. Pure BS was re-released in May 2008 as Pure BS Deluxe Edition. This re-issue included his cover of Michael Bublé's hit single "Home" and two additional tracks which Shelton wrote. The cover featured backing vocals from Miranda Lambert, whom Shelton would later marry. It was issued as a single in early 2008, and in July it became Shelton's fourth Number One single on the country charts.

"She Don't Love Me" was previously recorded by Trent Willmon on his self-titled debut album, and before that by Billy Ray Cyrus as "She Don't Love Me (She Don't Hate Me)" on his 2003 album Time Flies. It Ain't Easy Being Me" was originally recorded by the co-writer, Chris Knight on his 1998 self-titled debut album, and also covered by John Anderson on his 2001 album, Nobody's Got It All. "I Don't Care" was later reissued on Shelton's 2008 album, Startin' Fires.

== Recording ==
Pure BS was recorded while Shelton was going through a divorce from his first wife. Shelton has said that this experience colored the tone of the album, explaining, "I was dealing with a broken heart and having my world turned upside-down and drinking way too much, and I just put all that on the record and gave it to the fans to see what they thought about that period of my life."

== Track listing ==
No.	Title	Writer(s)	Length
1.	"This Can't Be Good"	Blake Shelton, Timothy DeArmitt	3:32
2.	"Don't Make Me"	Marla Cannon-Goodman, Deanna Bryant, Dave Berg	4:07
3.	"The More I Drink"	David Lee Murphy, Chris DuBois, Dave Turnbull	3:37
4.	"I Don't Care"	Dean Dillon, Casey Beathard	3:52
5.	"She Don't Love Me"	Beathard, Jay Knowles	3:03
6.	"Back There Again"	Tom Douglas	4:17
7.	"It Ain't Easy Bein' Me"	Chris Knight, Craig Wiseman	3:19
8.	"What I Wouldn't Give"	Charlie Brown, Tommy Karlas, Charley Stefl	4:22
9.	"I Have Been Lonely"	Shelton, Rachel Proctor, Michael Kosser	3:15
10.	"She Can't Get That"	Billy Lawson, Wally Wilson	3:45
11.	"The Last Country Song" (featuring John Anderson and George Jones)	Shelton, Kosser, Bobby Braddock	3:23
Total length:			40:32

Deluxe Edition bonus tracks
No.	Title	Writer(s)	Length
12.	"Chances"	Shelton	3:52
13.	"I Can't Walk Away"	Shelton	3:41
14.	"Home"	Michael Bublé, Alan Chang, Amy Foster-Gillies	3:50

== Producers ==
- Paul Worley – tracks 1, 6, 8
- Brent Rowan - tracks 2, 3, 5, 7, 14
- Bobby Braddock - tracks 4, 9–13

== Personnel ==
- Blake Shelton – lead vocals, acoustic guitar (3, 5, 7)
- Mike Rojas – keyboards (1, 6, 8)
- Jim "Moose" Brown – acoustic piano (2, 3, 5, 7), Hammond B3 organ (2, 3, 5, 7)
- Brent Rowan – keyboards (2–5, 7, 9, 10, 11), acoustic guitar (2–5, 7, 9, 10, 11), electric guitar (2–5, 7, 9, 10, 11), 12-string acoustic guitar (2–5, 7, 9, 10, 11), mandolin (2–5, 7, 9, 10, 11), bass (2–5, 7, 9, 10, 11), drum programming (2–5, 7, 9, 10, 11)
- Bobby Braddock – synthesizers (4, 9, 10, 11), string arrangements (4)
- Tim Lauer – Hammond B3 organ (4, 9, 10, 11), string arrangements (4)
- Gordon Mote – acoustic piano (4, 9, 10)
- Timothy De Armitt – acoustic guitar (1, 8)
- J.T. Corenflos – electric guitar (1, 6, 8)
- Dan Dugmore – electric guitar (1, 3, 6, 7, 8), steel guitar (1, 3, 6, 7, 8), lap steel guitar (1, 3, 6, 7, 8)
- Biff Watson – acoustic guitar (1, 6, 8)
- Paul Worley – electric guitar (1, 6, 8)
- Bryan Sutton – acoustic guitar (4, 9, 10)
- Aubrey Haynie – mandolin (2, 3, 5)
- Jonathan Yudkin – mandolin (4, 9, 11), fiddle (4, 9, 11)
- Paul Franklin – steel guitar (2, 4, 6, 9, 10, 11)
- Craig Young – bass (1, 6, 8)
- Mark Hill – bass (2, 3, 5, 7)
- Glenn Worf – bass (4, 9, 10)
- Greg Morrow – drums (1, 6, 8)
- Chad Cromwell – drums (2, 3, 5, 7)
- Shannon Forrest – drums (2, 4, 9, 10, 11)
- Eric Darken – percussion (2–5, 7), shaker (2–5, 7)
- Rob Hajacos – fiddle (10)
- Anthony LaMarchina – cello (4)
- Monisa Angell – viola (4)
- Kristin Wilkinson – viola (4)
- David Angell – violin (4)
- David Davidson – violin (4)
- Wes Hightower – harmony vocals (1, 4, 9, 10, 11)
- Karyn Rochelle – harmony vocals (1, 8)
- Chip Davis – backing vocals (2, 4, 9, 11
- Perry Coleman - backing vocals (3, 5, 7)
- Melodie Crittenden - backing vocals (4, 9, 10, 11)
- Rachel Proctor – harmony vocals (9)
- Blue Miller – backing vocals (10,
- Dennis Wilson – backing vocals (11)
- John Anderson – lead vocals (11)
- George Jones – lead vocals (11)
- Miranda Lambert – backing vocals (14

== Chart performance ==
=== Weekly charts ===
Chart (2007)	Peak position
US Billboard 200	8
US Top Country Albums (Billboard)	2

=== Year-end charts ===
Chart (2007)	Position
US Top Country Albums (Billboard)	52
Chart (2008)	Position
US Top Country Albums (Billboard)	36

=== Singles ===
Year	Single	Peak chart positions	
Year	Single	US Country	US
2006	"Don't Make Me"	12	79
2007	"The More I Drink"	19	102
2008	"Home"	1	41

== Certifications ==
Region	Certification	Certified units/sales
United States (RIAA)	Gold	500,000^{^}
^{^} Shipments figures based on certification alone.
