= Nobody but Me (Blake Shelton song) =

"Nobody But Me"

Single by Blake Shelton

from the album Blake Shelton's Barn & Grill
- Released: August 30, 2005
- Genre: Country
- Length: 2:38
- Label: Warner Bros. Nashville
- Songwriters: Shawn Camp, Philip White
- Producer: Bobby Braddock

Blake Shelton singles chronology
"Goodbye Time" (2005)	"Nobody But Me" (2005)	"Don't Make Me" (2006)

"Nobody But Me" is a song written by Shawn Camp and Philip White, and recorded by American country music singer Blake Shelton. It was released in August 2005 as the fourth and final single from his album Blake Shelton's Barn & Grill.

This song debuted at number 60 on the Hot Country Songs chart dated September 3, 2005. It charted for 36 weeks, and peaked at number 4 on the chart dated April 15, 2006. In addition, this song peaked at number 60 on the Billboard Hot 100.

== Content ==
The song describes a man who is desperately begging a woman not to "go loving on nobody but [him]."

== Music video ==
The music video was directed by Peter Zavadil and premiered in September 2005. It was filmed in Maine.

== Charts ==
=== Weekly charts ===
Chart (2005–2006)	Peak position
Canada Country (Radio & Records)	7
US Billboard Hot 100	60
US Hot Country Songs (Billboard)	4

=== Year-end charts ===
Chart (2006)	Position
US Country Songs (Billboard)	26
