= Andrew Jannakos =

American singer-songwriter

- Born: September 25, 1993 (age 32); Flowery Branch, Georgia, U.S.
- Genres: Country
- Occupations: Singer, songwriter
- Instruments: Vocals, guitar
- Years active: 2019–present
- Label: Sony Music Nashville/RCA Nashville
- Website: www.andrewjannakos.com

Andrew Jannakos (born September 25, 1993) is an American country music singer-songwriter signed to Sony Music Nashville/RCA Nashville. He first gained publicity as a contestant on Season 16 of The Voice. Jannakos debuted at No. 1 on Billboard's Emerging Artist chart after releasing his introductory single "Gone Too Soon" on September 15, 2020. The song later topped Billboard's Country Digital Song Sales chart and hit No. 12 on the Hot Country Songs chart.

== Early life and The Voice ==
Jannakos was born and raised in Flowery Branch, Georgia, where he grew up in a musical family. He cites Brad Paisley, Shania Twain, Chris Stapleton and Clay Walker as his earliest influences. After graduating from high school, he worked as a sauté chef and waiter for several years while pursuing music on the side, uploading performance videos to YouTube and Facebook.

After seeing one of Jannakos' performance videos online, a recruiter for NBC's The Voice invited him for a private audition in Atlanta. Jannakos debuted on Episode 6 during the show's blind auditions, after which he joined Team Adam Levine before being eliminated in the battle rounds.

== Career ==
Following his run on The Voice, Jannakos began writing and recording material for his debut project. In October 2019, he independently released "Living On Love," following it with "Southern Skies" in March 2020. Jannakos dropped his eponymous debut EP one month later.

On July 25, 2020, Jannakos previewed his song "Gone Too Soon" in a clip on the video-sharing platform TikTok. The video went viral overnight, racking up 250,000 likes and earning Jannakos 125,000 followers by the next morning. Jannakos officially released the song in September and began fielding record deal offers. On November 10, 2020, Sony Music Nashville announced that Jannakos had signed a recording deal with its RCA Nashville imprint.In 2020, Jannakos won the Overall Grand Prize in the 25th Annual USA Songwriting Competition with his song “Southern Skies”, co-written with Michael O'Neal Smith, this song also won Best Country Song award as well.

Meanwhile, "Gone Too Soon" hit No. 1 on Billboard's Country Digital Song Sales chart, No. 2 on the Digital Song Sales chart, No. 12 on the Hot Country Songs chart, and the song helped Jannakos debut at No. 1 on Billboard's Emerging Artist chart. "Gone Too Soon" impacted country radio on February 1, 2021, and landed within Billboard's Hot 100 chart. A month later, Jannakos released "Wine Country" as his major-label debut.

== Discography ==
=== Singles ===
- "Living On Love" (Independent, 2019)
- "Southern Skies" (Independent, 2020)
- "Gone Too Soon" (Independent, 2020) #12 on Hot Country Songs chart, #1 on Country Digital Song Sales chart
- "Wine Country" (Sony Music Nashville, 2021)
