= Some Beach =

Single by Blake Shelton

from the album Blake Shelton's Barn & Grill
- Released: July 26, 2004
- Recorded: 2004
- Genre: Country
- Length: 3:24
- Label: Warner Bros. Nashville
- Songwriters: Rory Feek; Paul Overstreet
- Producer: Bobby Braddock

Blake Shelton singles chronology
"When Somebody Knows You That Well" (2004)	"Some Beach" (2004)	"Goodbye Time" (2005)

"Some Beach" is a song written by Rory Feek and Paul Overstreet and recorded by American country music artist Blake Shelton. It was released in July 2004 as the second single from Shelton's 2004 album Blake Shelton's Barn & Grill. The song became Shelton's third number one hit on the U.S. Billboard Hot Country Songs chart and spent four weeks at that position.

== Content ==
The narrator deals with frustrations, such as being flipped off in interstate traffic and having to wait all afternoon at the dentist's office, by wishing that he were "on some beach, somewhere." The song's title is a double entendre, playing on a Southern United States dialectal form of the epithet "son of a bitch" ("som' bitch").

According to the sheet music published at Musicnotes.com, the song is composed and written in the key of C major and is set in time signature of common time with a tempo of 116 beats per minute. Shelton’s vocal range spans from the notes G^{2} to E^{4}.

== Music video ==
The music video was directed by Peter Zavadil, and features Shelton driving a pickup truck down a freeway, trying to park the truck, and going to the dentist. The video premiered on CMT on July 29, 2004, and featuring NASCAR driver Elliott Sadler.

== Chart performance ==
"Some Beach" debuted at number 51 on the U.S. Billboard Hot Country Songs for the chart week of August 7, 2004.

Chart (2004–2005)	Peak position
Canada Country (Radio & Records)	3
US Billboard Hot 100	28
US Hot Country Songs (Billboard)	1

=== Year-end charts ===
Chart (2005)	Position
US Country Songs (Billboard)	28

== Certifications ==
Region	Certification	Certified units/sales
United States (RIAA)	Platinum	1,000,000^{‡}
^{‡} Sales+streaming figures based on certification alone.
