= Austin (Blake Shelton song) =

Single by Blake Shelton

from the album Blake Shelton
- B-side: "Problems at Home"
- Released: April 16, 2001
- Recorded: 2001
- Genre: Country
- Length: 3:52
- Label: Giant; Warner Bros. Nashville
- Songwriters: David Kent; Kirsti Manna
- Producer: Bobby Braddock

Blake Shelton singles chronology
| "Austin" (2001) | "All Over Me" (2001) |

"Austin" is a song written by David Kent and Kirsti Manna and recorded by American country music artist Blake Shelton. It was released in April 2001 as Shelton's debut single and the first from his self-titled debut album.

The song was originally released on the Giant Records label; however, that label closed its doors as the single was climbing the charts, with Shelton and his single being transferred to the Warner Bros. Records label. "Austin" was also Shelton's first number one hit on the U.S. Billboard Hot Country Songs chart, spending five weeks at that position. It also managed to cross over to pop radio, as it peaked at number 18 on the Billboard Hot 100. At the time, it was his highest-peaking single on that chart until "Honey Bee" debuted at number 13 in 2011. "Austin" tied a record set by Billy Ray Cyrus in 1992. Cyrus' "Achy Breaky Heart" stayed atop the chart for five weeks, setting the mark for an artist's debut single in the Broadcast Data Systems era of the chart. BDS began monitoring radio play for the chart in January 1991. The song was originally pitched to Clay Walker who turned it down.

== Content ==
The song tells of a woman who moves to Austin after breaking up with her boyfriend. Less than a year later, she decides to contact him. She calls numerous times and is greeted by his answering machine that explains where he could be. The message always ends with the following phrase: "And P.S. if this is Austin, I still love you," which is referring to the woman as Austin.

== Commercial performance ==
"Austin" debuted at number 58 on the U.S. Billboard Hot Country Songs chart for the week of April 28, 2001. It reached the number one spot on August 11, 2001, and remained there for five weeks until September 15, 2001, when it was knocked off by "I'm Just Talkin' About Tonight" by Toby Keith. The song was certified Gold on February 25, 2015, and Platinum on June 9, 2015, by the RIAA. The song has sold 929,000 copies in the U.S. as of January 2016.

== Music video ==
This was Shelton's first music video, and was directed by Deaton-Flanigen Productions. The music video debuted on CMT on July 17, 2001. It depicts Shelton standing in front of a red 1968 first generation Ford Mustang and projector screen with a woman on it. The woman attempts to call the narrator and it eventually shows her driving to where the narrator is and walking up to Shelton.

== Charts and certifications ==
"Austin" debuted on the charts in mid-2001 and by September, it had spent five weeks in the number one position of Billboard Hot Country Songs. This was the longest amount of time spent at the number one position by a debut single since Billy Ray Cyrus' "Achy Breaky Heart" also spent five weeks there in 1992.

=== Weekly charts ===
| Chart (2001) | Peak position |
|---|---|
| US Billboard Hot 100 | 18 |
| US Hot Country Songs (Billboard) | 1 |

=== Year-end charts ===
| Chart (2001) | Position |
|---|---|
| US Billboard Hot 100 | 76 |
| US Country Songs (Billboard) | 9 |

=== Certifications ===
| Region | Certification | Certified units/sales |
|---|---|---|
| United States (RIAA) | 2× Platinum | 929,000 |
