= Goodbye Time =

1988 single by Conway Twitty

Single by Conway Twitty

from the album Still in Your Dreams
- B-side: "Your Loving Side"
- Released: February 1988
- Genre: Country
- Length: 3:25
- Label: MCA
- Songwriters: James Dean Hicks; Roger Murrah
- Producers: Jimmy Bowen; Dee Henry; Conway Twitty

Conway Twitty singles chronology
"That's My Job" (1987)	"Goodbye Time" (1988)	"Saturday Night Special" (1988)

"Goodbye Time" is a song recorded by American country music singer Conway Twitty. It was released in February 1988 as the first single from Twitty's album Still in Your Dreams. The song reached number 7 on the Billboard Hot Country Songs chart.

In 2004, a cover was recorded by country music artist Blake Shelton on his album Blake Shelton's Barn & Grill. This cover was issued in early 2005 as that album's third single, and by mid-2005, it became the fourth Top Ten hit of Shelton's career, peaking at number 10 on the U.S. Billboard country charts and number 73 on the Billboard Hot 100.

== Background and writing ==
James Dean Hicks and Roger Murrah were inspired to write "Goodbye Time" while Hicks's brother was going through a divorce. According to Hicks, his brother was "holding on to something that was already gone", and his situation inspired Hicks and Murrah to write the song. Murrah pointed out that the two "just started playing music and singing lyrics", and the song came together.

Initially, the two songwriters had planned for Reba McEntire to record "Goodbye Time". However, McEntire felt that she could not sing the song, as she, too, had been going through a divorce at the time, and she felt that several of the song's lyrics matched what her ex-husband had told her when they split. The song was then pitched to Conway Twitty who recorded it. His version features Vince Gill on background vocals.

== Content ==
"Goodbye Time" is a ballad in which the narrator addresses a former lover, attempting to keep her from leaving him. Ultimately, he tells her that "if the feeling's gone / Words won't stop you anyway". In the chorus, he adds that "if it's too late for love to change your mind / Then it's goodbye time".

== Blake Shelton version ==
"Goodbye Time"

Single by Blake Shelton

from the album Blake Shelton's Barn & Grill
- Released: January 24, 2005
- Genre: Country
- Length: 3:21
- Label: Warner Bros. Nashville
- Songwriters: James Dean Hicks; Roger Murrah
- Producer: Bobby Braddock

Blake Shelton singles chronology
"Some Beach" (2004)	"Goodbye Time" (2005)	"Nobody but Me" (2005)

16 years after Twitty's rendition, Blake Shelton recorded "Goodbye Time" for his third studio album, 2004's Blake Shelton's Barn & Grill, having been inspired to record the song after hearing it on a television special about Twitty. Murrah felt positively of Shelton's rendition, stating that Shelton "[made] the song his own".

== Chart positions ==
=== Conway Twitty ===
Chart (1988)	Peak position
US Hot Country Songs (Billboard)	7
Canadian RPM Country Tracks	11

==== Year-end charts ====
Chart (1988)	Position
US Hot Country Songs (Billboard)	76

=== Blake Shelton ===
Chart (2005)	Peak position
Canada Country (Radio & Records)	18
US Billboard Hot 100	73
US Hot Country Songs (Billboard)	10

==== Year-end charts ====
Chart (2005)	Position
US Country Songs (Billboard)	47
