= The Baby (song) =

2002 single by Blake Shelton

Single by Blake Shelton

from the album The Dreamer
- B-side: "Heavy Liftin'"
- Released: October 28, 2002
- Genre: Country
- Length: 3:54
- Label: Warner Bros. Nashville
- Songwriters: Harley Allen; Michael White
- Producer: Bobby Braddock

Blake Shelton singles chronology
"Ol' Red" (2002)	"The Baby" (2002)	"Heavy Liftin'" (2003)

"The Baby" is a song written by Michael White and Harley Allen and recorded by American country music singer Blake Shelton. It was released on October 28, 2002, as the first single from Shelton's album The Dreamer. The song became Shelton's second number one hit on the US Billboard Hot Country Singles and Tracks chart in early 2003, and held that position for three weeks.

== Content ==
The song describes how a mother thinks of her children, especially the narrator. He describes being the youngest child in his family, and tells of various situations where he is referred to as "the baby" of the family. Later on, the narrator tells of receiving a telephone call to come to the family's home state of Louisiana, where his mother is dying (it is unclear whether she was in a local hospital or if she was at the family house under hospice care); however, he arrives shortly after she is pronounced dead. The narrator then laments the passing of his mother, stating "I softly kissed that lady / And cried just like a baby."

== Music video ==
The video shows Shelton singing in a room with blue screens, watching flashbacks of his life and family. The roll of film also shows flashbacks and pictures of Shelton and his family. The video was directed by Peter Zavadil, and premiered on CMT on December 25, 2002, along with Keith Urban's "Raining on Sunday", and Deana Carter's "There's No Limit".

== Chart performance ==
The song debuted at No. 48 on the Hot Country Singles & Tracks chart dated November 2, 2002. It spent 24 weeks on that chart, and became his second Number One single on the chart dated February 22, 2003, holding the top spot for three weeks. It peaked at 28 on the Billboard Hot 100.

Chart (2002–2003)	Peak position
US Billboard Hot 100	28
US Hot Country Songs (Billboard)	1

=== Year-end charts ===
Chart (2003)	Position
US Country Songs (Billboard)	19
