= You Oughta Be Here with Me =

Studio album by George Jones
- Released: August 20, 1990
- Studio: Eleven Eleven Sound Studios, and The Music Mill Nashville, TN
- Genre: Country
- Length: 33:07
- Label: Epic
- Producer: Billy Sherrill

George Jones chronology
One Woman Man (1989)	You Oughta Be Here with Me (1990)	And Along Came Jones (1991)

Singles from You Oughta Be Here with Me
- 1. "Hell Stays Open (All Night Long)" Released: March 1990; 2. "Six Foot Deep Six Foot Down" Released: June 1990

Professional ratings
Review scores
Source	Rating
Allmusic	3/5 stars

You Oughta Be Here with Me is an album by American country music singer George Jones. This album was released in 1990 on Epic Records. It includes the singles "Hell Stays Open (All Night Long)" and "Six Foot Deep, Six Foot Down", neither of which charted.

== Track listing ==
No.	Title	Writer(s)	Length
1.	"Hell Stays Open (All Night Long)"	Bobby Harden	3:31
2.	"You Oughta Be Here with Me"	Roger Miller	4:16
3.	"Somebody Always Paints the Wall"	Charles Browder, Elroy Kahanek, Nelson Larkin, Tommy Smith	3:21
4.	"I Sleep Just Like a Baby"	Jesse Chambers, Larry Jenkins, Billy Sherrill	3:36
5.	"Someone That You Used to Know"	Jack Tempchin, Bobby Whitlock	3:30
6.	"I Want to Grow Old With You"	Bobby Braddock	2:56
7.	"A Cold Day in December"	Bobby Braddock	3:12
8.	"Six Foot Deep, Six Foot Down"	Don Cook, Curly Putman, Charles Rains	2:36
9.	"If the World Don't End Tomorrow"	Billy Sherrill	2:40
10.	"Ol' Red"	Don Goodman, Bo Bohan, Mark Sherrill	3:29
