= Gary Allan discography =

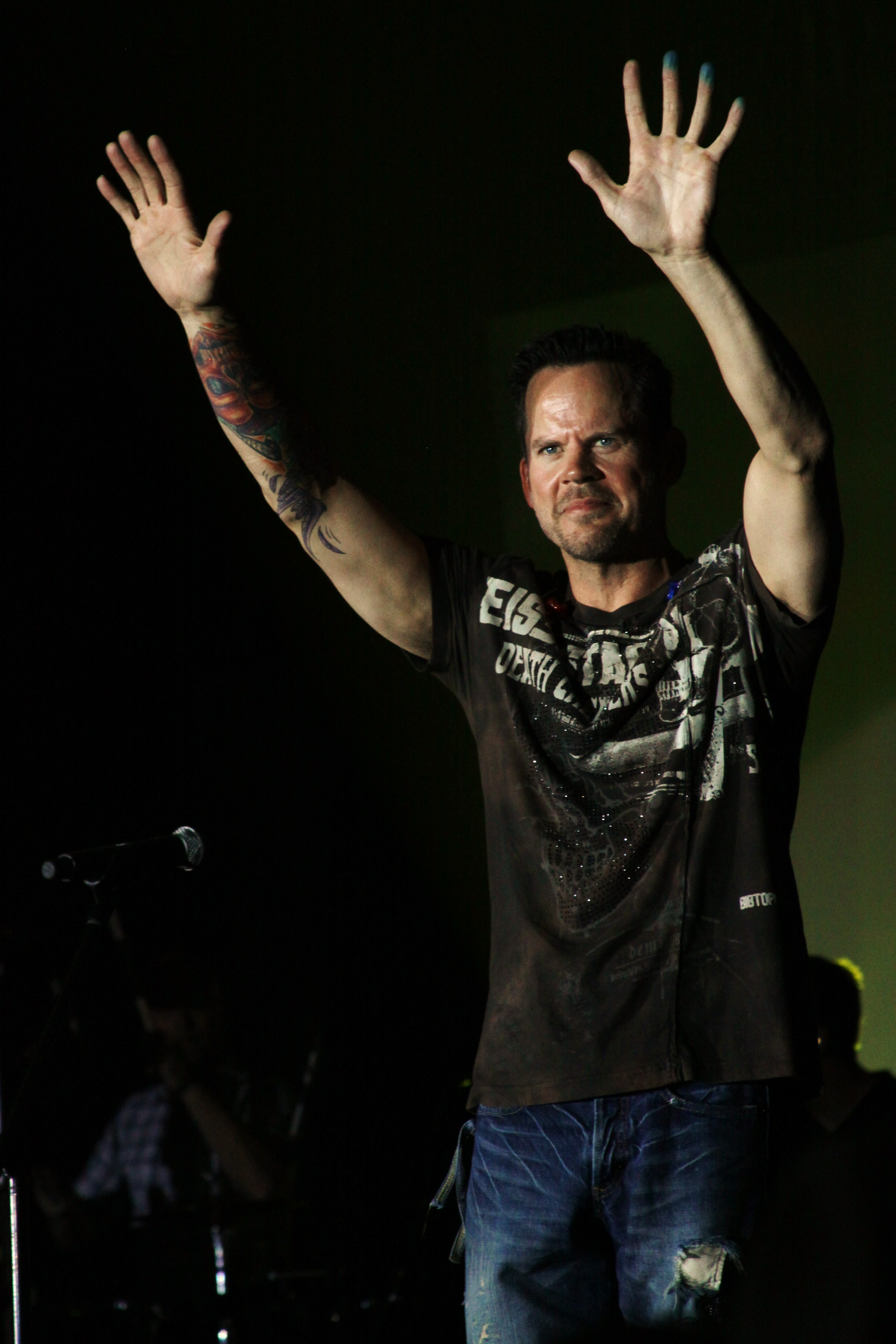
- Allan in 2010
- Studio albums: 10
- Compilation albums: 2
- Singles: 32
- Music videos: 21

Gary Allan is an American country music singer. His discography comprises ten studio albums, two greatest hits albums, and 32 singles. His first two albums were issued on Decca Records Nashville, while the other five and his Greatest Hits album were all issued on MCA Nashville. 1999's Smoke Rings in the Dark, 2001's Alright Guy and 2003's See If I Care are all certified platinum by the RIAA, while his 1996 debut Used Heart for Sale, 2005's Tough All Over, 2006's Greatest Hits, and 2007's Living Hard are all certified gold.

Out of Allan's 31 singles, all have charted on the US Billboard Hot Country Songs chart, and thirteen of these have also crossed over to the Billboard Hot 100. Among his singles are four Number Ones: "Man to Man", "Tough Little Boys" (both 2003), "Nothing On but the Radio" (2004), and "Every Storm (Runs Out of Rain)" (2013). Eight more have reached the Top 10. "Man to Man" is also his highest peak on the Hot 100 at number 25. Allan has also charted twice with songs that received unsolicited airplay: a 1997 cover of "Please Come Home for Christmas", and a 2000 cover of Del Shannon's "Runaway".

== Studio albums ==
=== 1990s ===
Title	Album details	Peak chart positions				Certifications
Title	Album details	US Country	US	AUS	CAN Country	Certifications
Used Heart for Sale	Release date: September 24, 1996; Label: Decca Nashville; Formats: CD, cassette	20	136	—	—	RIAA: Gold
It Would Be You	Release date: May 19, 1998; Label: Decca Nashville; Formats: CD, cassette	21	132	—	—	
Smoke Rings in the Dark	Release date: October 26, 1999; Label: MCA Nashville; Formats: CD, cassette, vinyl	9	84	45	13	RIAA: Platinum
"—" denotes releases that did not chart

=== 2000s ===
Title	Album details	Peak chart positions		Certifications
Title	Album details	US Country	US	Certifications
Alright Guy	Release date: October 2, 2001; Label: MCA Nashville; Formats: CD	4	39	RIAA: Platinum
See If I Care	Release date: September 30, 2003; Label: MCA Nashville; Formats: CD	2	17	RIAA: Platinum
Tough All Over	Release date: October 11, 2005; Label: MCA Nashville; Formats: CD, music download	1	3	RIAA: Gold
Living Hard	Release date: October 23, 2007; Label: MCA Nashville; Formats: CD, music download	3	3	RIAA: Gold

=== 2010s–2020s ===
Title	Album details	Peak chart positions			Certifications	Sales
Title	Album details	US Country	US	CAN	Certifications	Sales
Get Off on the Pain	Release date: March 9, 2010; Label: MCA Nashville; Formats: CD, music download	2	5	—		US: 200,000
Set You Free	Release date: January 22, 2013; Label: MCA Nashville; Formats: CD, music download	1	1	13	RIAA: Gold	US: 219,000
Ruthless	Release date: June 25, 2021; Label: EMI Nashville; Formats: CD, vinyl, music download	8	86	—		
"—" denotes releases that did not chart

== Compilation albums ==
Title	Album details	Peak chart positions		Certifications
Title	Album details	US Country	US	Certifications
Greatest Hits	Release date: March 6, 2007; Label: MCA Nashville; Formats: CD, music download	1	5	RIAA: Gold
Icon	Release date: March 6, 2012; Label: MCA Nashville; Formats: CD, music download	20	151	

== Singles ==
=== 1990s ===
Year	Single	Peak chart positions			Certification	Album
Year	Single	US Country	US	CAN Country	Certification	Album
1996	"Her Man"	7	—	9	RIAA: Gold	Used Heart for Sale
1997	"Forever and a Day"	44	—	75		Used Heart for Sale
1997	"From Where I'm Sitting"	43	—	78		Used Heart for Sale
1997	"Living in a House Full of Love"	43	—	63		Used Heart for Sale
1998	"It Would Be You"	7	— (Note: "It Would Be You" did not enter the Hot 100, but peaked at number 1 on Bubbling Under Hot 100 Singles, which acts a 25-song extension of the Hot 100.)	23		It Would Be You
1998	"No Man in His Wrong Heart"	43	—	74		It Would Be You
1998	"I'll Take Today"	47	—	70		It Would Be You
1999	"Smoke Rings in the Dark"	12	76	5		Smoke Rings in the Dark
"—" denotes releases that did not chart

=== 2000s ===
Year	Single	Peak chart positions				Certifications	Album
Year	Single	US Country	US	CAN Country (Note: Chart positions from RPM Country Tracks in 2000, Nielsen BDS in 2002, Radio & Records from 2004 to 2005, and Billboard Canada Country from 2006 to present.)	CAN	Certifications	Album
2000	"Lovin' You Against My Will"	34	—	30	—		Smoke Rings in the Dark
2000	"Right Where I Need to Be"	5	42	63 (Note: "Right Where I Need to Be" reached number 63 when RPM ceased publication in November 2000.)	—	RIAA: Platinum	Smoke Rings in the Dark
2001	"Man of Me"	18	— (Note: "Man of Me" did not enter the Hot 100, but peaked at number 7 on Bubbling Under Hot 100 Singles, which acts a 25-song extension of the Hot 100.)	×	—		Alright Guy
2002	"The One"	3	37	4	—		Alright Guy
2002	"Man to Man"	1	25	1	—		Alright Guy
2003	"Tough Little Boys"	1	32	×	—		See If I Care
2003	"Songs About Rain"	12	71	10	—	RIAA: Gold	See If I Care
2004	"Nothing On but the Radio"	1	32	6	—	RIAA: Gold	See If I Care
2005	"Best I Ever Had"	7	51	13	—	RIAA: Platinum	Tough All Over
2006	"Life Ain't Always Beautiful"	4	61	20	—	RIAA: Gold	Tough All Over
2006	"A Feelin' Like That"	12	94	15	—		Greatest Hits
2007	"Watching Airplanes"	2	43	11	72	RIAA: Platinum	Living Hard
2008	"Learning How to Bend"	13	96	23	—		Living Hard
2008	"She's So California"	24	—	—	—		Living Hard
2009	"Today"	18	— (Note: "Today" did not enter the Hot 100, but peaked at number 6 on Bubbling Under Hot 100 Singles, which acts a 25-song extension of the Hot 100.)	—	—		Get Off on the Pain
"—" denotes releases that did not chart "×" indicates that no relevant chart existed or was archived

=== 2010s and 2020s ===
Year	Single	Peak chart positions					Certifications	Album
Year	Single	US Country	US Country Airplay	US	CAN Country	CAN	Certifications	Album
2010	"Get Off on the Pain"	18		— (Note: "Get Off on the Pain" did not enter the Hot 100, but peaked at number 1 on Bubbling Under Hot 100 Singles, which acts a 25-song extension of the Hot 100.)	50	—		Get Off on the Pain
2010	"Kiss Me When I'm Down"	38		—	—	—		Get Off on the Pain
2012	"Every Storm (Runs Out of Rain)"	1	1	26	1	41	RIAA: 2× Platinum	Set You Free
2013	"Pieces"	29	18	— (Note: "Pieces" did not enter the Hot 100, but peaked at number 5 on Bubbling Under Hot 100 Singles, which acts a 25-song extension of the Hot 100.)	34	—		Set You Free
2013	"It Ain't the Whiskey"	40	36	—	—	—	RIAA: Gold	Set You Free
2015	"Hangover Tonight"	49	41	—	—	—		Non-album singles
2016	"Do You Wish It Was Me?"	—	57	—	—	—		Non-album singles
2017	"Mess Me Up"	—	45	—	—	—		Non-album singles
2020	"Waste of a Whiskey Drink"	—	60	—	—	—		Ruthless
"—" denotes releases that did not chart

== Other charted songs ==
Year	Single	Peak positions	Album
Year	Single	US Country	Album
1997	"Please Come Home for Christmas"	70	A Country Christmas 1996
2000	"Runaway"	74	Smoke Rings in the Dark

== Music videos ==
Year	Video	Director
1996	"Her Man"	Gerry Wenner
1997	"Forever and a Day"	Guy Guillet
1997	"From Where I'm Sitting"	Charley Randazzo
1998	"It Would Be You"	Gerry Wenner
1998	"I'll Take Today"	Chris Rogers
1999	"Smoke Rings in the Dark"	Chris Rogers
2000	"Lovin' You Against My Will"	Eric Welch
2001	"Right Where I Need to Be"	Chris Rogers
2001	"Man of Me"	Morgan Lawley
2002	"The One"	Morgan Lawley
2003	"Tough Little Boys"	Morgan Lawley
2004	"Songs About Rain"	Morgan Lawley
2005	"Best I Ever Had"	Paul Boyd
2006	"Life Ain't Always Beautiful"	Paul Boyd
2007	"Watching Airplanes"	Stephen Shepherd
2008	"Learning How to Bend"	Stephen Shepherd
2009	"Today"	Stephen Shepherd
2010	"Get Off on the Pain"	Stephen Shepherd
2012	"Every Storm (Runs Out of Rain)"	Stephen Shepherd
2013	"Pieces"	Wes Edwards
2013	"It Ain't the Whiskey"	TK McKamy
2015	"Hangover Tonight"	Stephen Shepherd
2020	"Waste of a Whiskey Drink"	Peter Zavadil
