= Greatest Hits (Gary Allan album) =

Greatest hits album by Gary Allan
- Released: March 6, 2007
- Genre: Country
- Length: 54:51
- Label: MCA Nashville
- Producer: Various

Gary Allan chronology
Tough All Over (2005)	Greatest Hits (2007)	Living Hard (2007)

Singles from Greatest Hits
- 1. "A Feelin' Like That" Released: October 23, 2006

Professional ratings
Review scores
Source	Rating
Allmusic	4.5/5 stars

Greatest Hits is the first compilation album by American country music singer Gary Allan. It was released on March 6, 2007 on the MCA Nashville label and has been certified gold by the RIAA. The album includes the greatest hits from his first six studio albums, along with two new songs, "A Feelin' Like That" and "As the Crow Flies". The former was released as a single, reaching number 12 on the Hot Country Songs charts in 2007.

The album debuted at number five on the U.S. Billboard 200, selling about 70,000 copies in its first week.

== Track listing ==
No.	Title	Writer(s)	Length
1.	"A Feelin' Like That" (new track)	Ira Dean, David Lee Murphy, Kim Tribble	3:32
2.	"Right Where I Need to Be"	Casey Beathard, Kendell Marvel	3:04
3.	"Songs About Rain"	Liz Rose, Pat McLaughlin	3:57
4.	"Smoke Rings in the Dark"	Rivers Rutherford, Houston Robert	4:20
5.	"Her Man"	Kent Robbins	2:45
6.	"Best I Ever Had"	Matt Scannell	4:07
7.	"Nothing On but the Radio"	Odie Blackmon, Byron Hill, Brice Long	3:33
8.	"Man to Man"	Jamie O'Hara	3:44
9.	"The One"	Billy Lee, Karen Manno	4:21
10.	"Lovin' You Against My Will"	O'Hara	4:01
11.	"It Would Be You"	Robbins, Dana Hunt Black	2:57
12.	"Man of Me"	George Teren, Rutherford	3:29
13.	"Tough Little Boys"	Don Sampson, Harley Allen	3:57
14.	"As the Crow Flies" (new track)	Keith Gattis	3:20
15.	"Life Ain't Always Beautiful"	Cyndi Goodman, Tommy Lee James	3:44
Total length:			54:51

== Personnel on new tracks ==
- Gary Allan - lead vocals
- Perry Coleman - background vocals (track 1)
- Chad Cromwell - drums
- Eric Darken - percussion
- Dan Dugmore - steel guitar (track 1)
- Jerry Flowers - background vocals (track 14)
- Kenny Greenberg - electric guitar
- Wes Hightower - background vocals (track 1)
- Steve Nathan - Hammond B-3 organ (track 1), piano (track 14)
- Russ Pahl - resonator guitar (track 14)
- Michael Rhodes - bass guitar
- Brent Rowan - electric guitar
- John Willis - acoustic guitar

== Charts ==
=== Weekly charts ===
Chart (2007)	Peak position
US Billboard 200	5
US Top Country Albums (Billboard)	1

=== Year-end charts ===
Chart (2007)	Position
US Billboard 200	160
US Top Country Albums (Billboard)	29
Chart (2008)	Position
US Top Country Albums (Billboard)	54

== Certifications ==
Region	Certification
United States (RIAA)	Gold
