= Icon (Gary Allan album) =

Compilation album by Gary Allan
- Released: March 6, 2012
- Genre: Country
- Length: 40:21
- Label: MCA Nashville

Gary Allan chronology
Get Off on the Pain (2010)	Icon (2012)	Set You Free (2013)

Icon is a compilation album by American country music artist Gary Allan. It was released on March 6, 2012. It is part of a series of similar Icon albums released by Universal Music Enterprises.

== Track listing ==
No.	Title	Writer(s)	Length
1.	"Watching Airplanes"	Jim Beavers, Jonathan Singleton	4:03
2.	"Man to Man"	Jamie O'Hara	3:41
3.	"Life Ain't Always Beautiful"	Cyndi Goodman, Tommy Lee James	3:44
4.	"Best I Ever Had"	Matt Scannell	4:06
5.	"Her Man"	Kent Robbins	2:44
6.	"Smoke Rings in the Dark"	Rivers Rutherford, Houston Robert	4:18
7.	"Tough Little Boys"	Don Sampson, Harley Allen	3:56
8.	"The One"	Karen Manno, Billy Lee	4:18
9.	"It Would Be You"	Dana Hunt Black, Robbins	2:56
10.	"Right Where I Need to Be"	Casey Beathard, Kendell Marvel	3:04
11.	"Nothing On but the Radio"	Byron Hill, Brice Long, Odie Blackmon	3:31
Total length:			40:21

== Critical reception ==
Professional ratings
Review scores
Source	Rating
Allmusic	4/5 stars

Steve Leggett of Allmusic notes the album is "a great introduction to a woefully unsung American artist."

== Charts ==
Icon debuted at number 29 on the U.S. Billboard Top Country Albums chart and number 200 on the Billboard 200.

Chart (2012)	Peak position
U.S. Billboard Top Country Albums	20
U.S. Billboard 200	151
