= List of Hot Country Singles & Tracks number ones of 2003 =

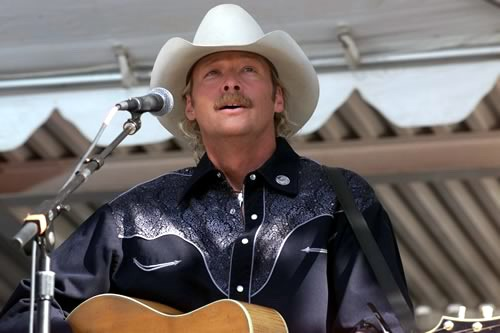
Alan Jackson collaborated with Jimmy Buffett on the song "It's Five O'Clock Somewhere", which spent eight weeks at number one.

Hot Country Songs is a chart that ranks the top-performing country music songs in the United States, published by Billboard magazine. In 2003, 19 different songs topped the chart, then published under the title Hot Country Singles & Tracks, in 52 issues of the magazine, based on weekly airplay data from country music radio stations compiled by Nielsen Broadcast Data Systems.

Singer George Strait's song "She'll Leave You with a Smile" was at number one at the start of the year, having been at the top since the issue dated December 28, 2002. It remained at number one for one further week in 2003 before being replaced by "19 Somethin'" by Mark Wills. The highest total number of weeks spent at number one by a song in 2003 was the eight achieved by "It's Five O'Clock Somewhere", a collaboration between Alan Jackson and Jimmy Buffett. The success of "It's Five O'Clock Somewhere" gave Buffett his first ever country number one, more than thirty years after he began his singing career. The duet spent an initial seven weeks at the top, was replaced for a week, and then returned for a final week at number one. The song's first spell at number one tied for the longest unbroken run at the top with "Have You Forgotten?" by Darryl Worley. In addition, the song's eight-week run at number one tied with Lonestar's "Amazed" for the longest-running number one based on country radio airplay since Nielsen Broadcast Data Systems was initiated in 1990, a record which would stand until 2022. Another collaboration between a younger star and a music veteran to top the charts in 2003 was "Beer for My Horses" by Toby Keith and Willie Nelson, which spent six weeks at number one and made Nelson, at age 70, the oldest singer to top the chart. The number one position was dominated by male artists; no solo female singers topped the chart in 2003, although the all-female band Dixie Chicks spent a single week at number one.

Three singers achieved their first number one hits in 2003, Gary Allan with "Man to Man", Joe Nichols with "Brokenheartsville", and Dierks Bentley with "What Was I Thinkin'". "Brokenheartsville"'s rise to the top benefited from a backlash against previous chart-toppers Dixie Chicks, after the group's lead singer Natalie Maines made controversial comments about then-United States President George W. Bush. This led to a number of radio stations dropping their song "Travelin' Soldier" and thus impacting its chart performance. Allan followed up "Man to Man" with a second number one later in the year with "Tough Little Boys" and was one of only two artists to place multiple songs at the top of the chart in 2003, the other being Keith, whose six weeks at number one with "Beer for My Horses" and five with "I Love This Bar" gave him a total of eleven weeks at number one, the most by any act in 2003. The final number one of the year was "There Goes My Life" by Kenny Chesney.

== Chart history ==
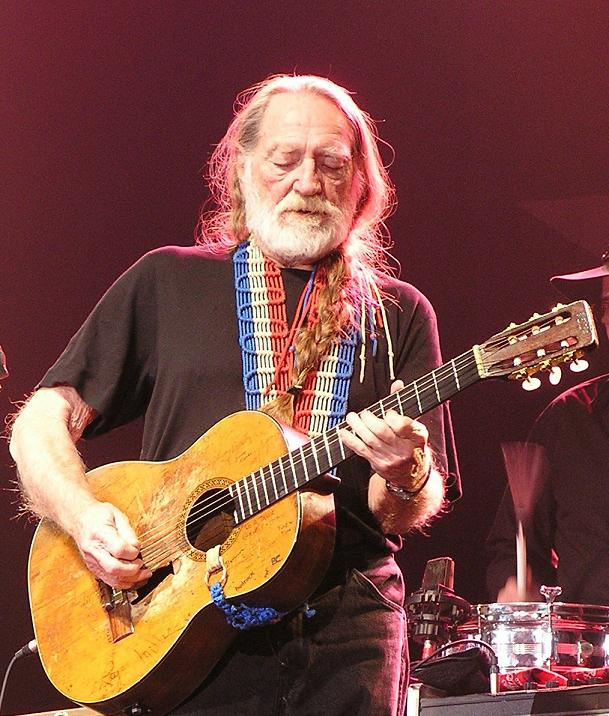
When Willie Nelson reached number one with his collaboration with Toby Keith, "Beer for My Horses", he became the oldest artist to top the chart, at age 70.

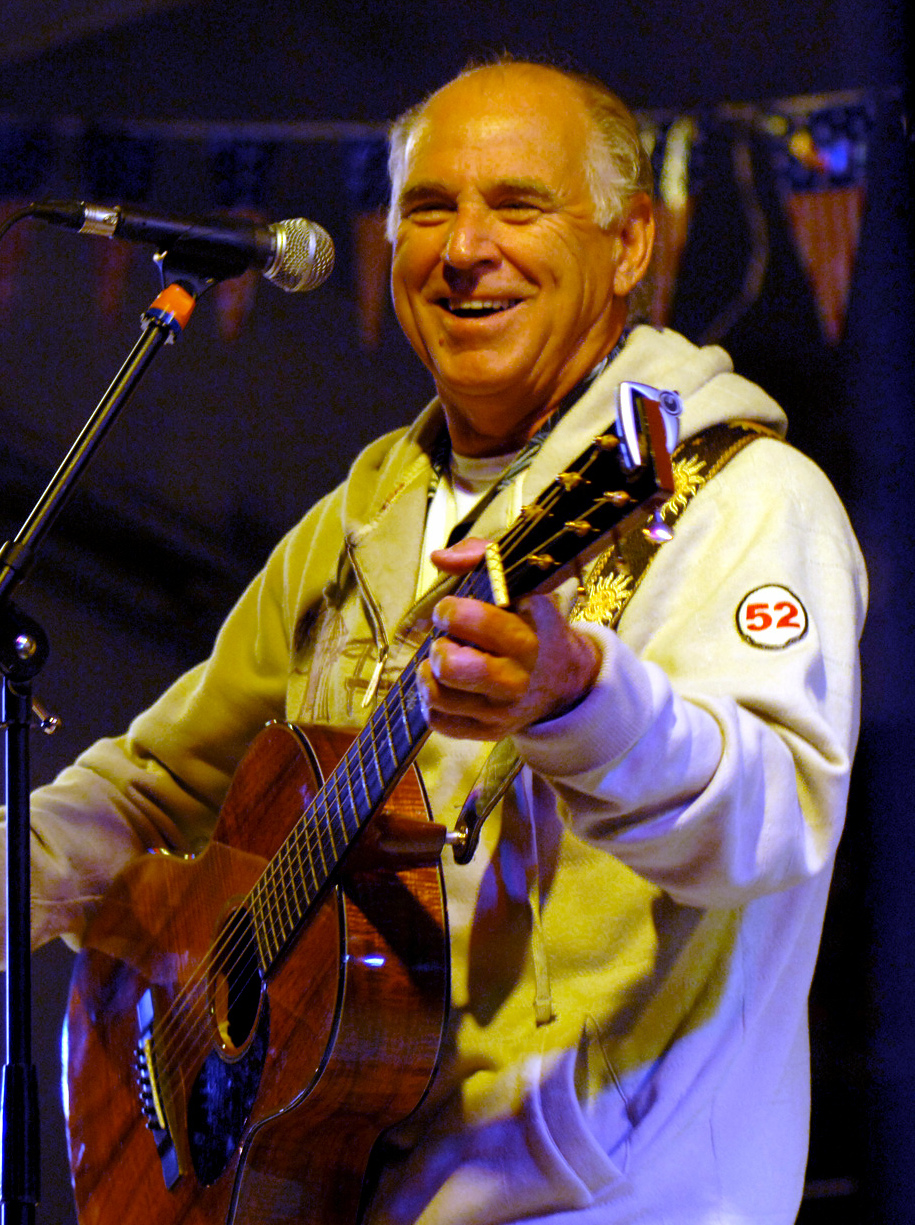
"It's Five O'Clock Somewhere" was Jimmy Buffett's first number one on the country chart in a career which had spanned more than thirty years.

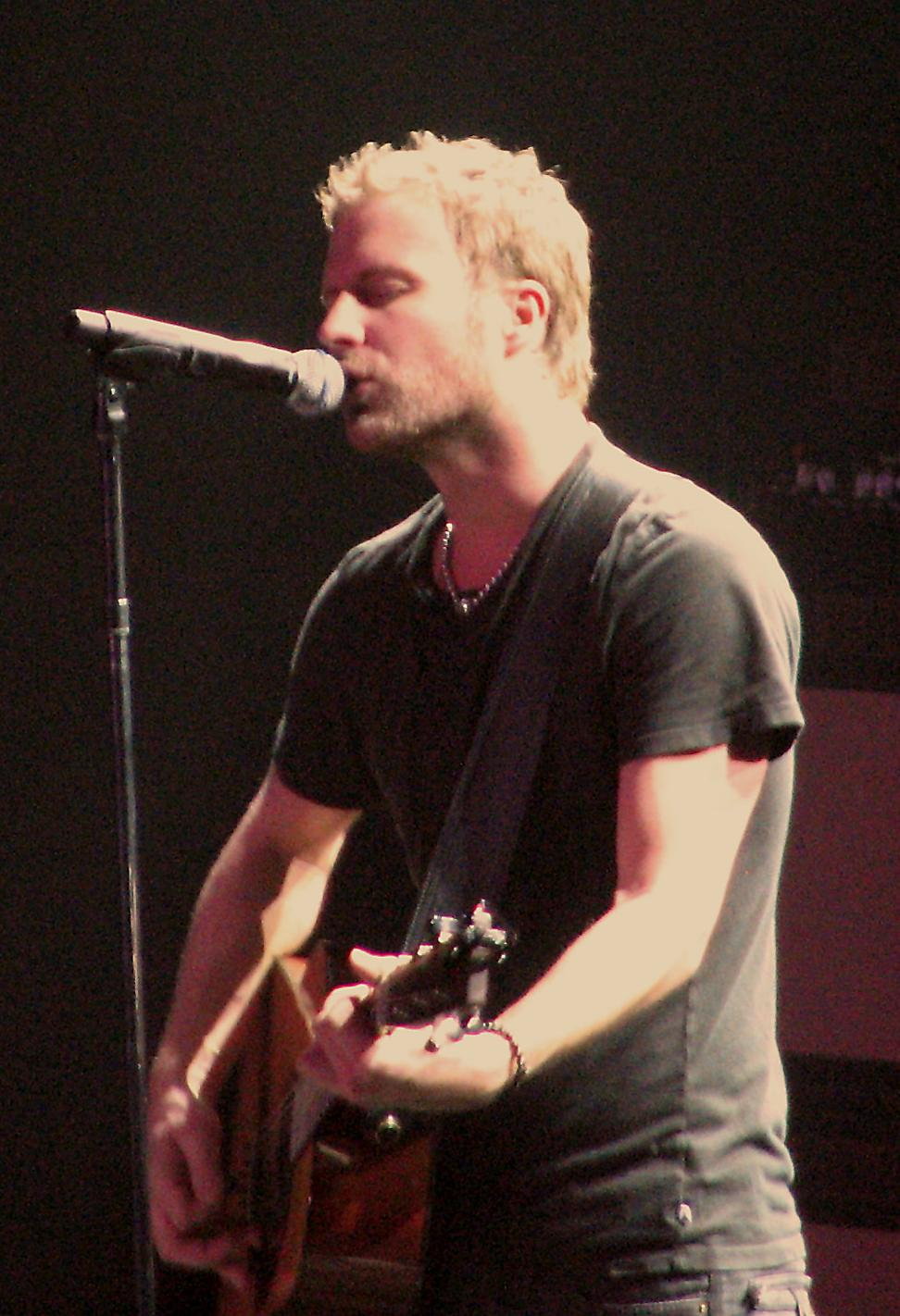
Dierks Bentley achieved his first number one with "What Was I Thinkin'".

| Issue date | Title | Artist(s) | Ref. |
|---|---|---|---|
| January 4 | "She'll Leave You with a Smile" | George Strait | |
| January 11 | "19 Somethin'" | Mark Wills | |
| January 18 | "19 Somethin'" | Mark Wills | |
| January 25 | "19 Somethin'" | Mark Wills | |
| February 1 | "19 Somethin'" | Mark Wills | |
| February 8 | "19 Somethin'" | Mark Wills | |
| February 15 | "19 Somethin'" | Mark Wills | |
| February 22 | "The Baby" | Blake Shelton | |
| March 1 | "The Baby" | Blake Shelton | |
| March 8 | "The Baby" | Blake Shelton | |
| March 15 | "Man to Man" | Gary Allan | |
| March 22 | "Travelin' Soldier" | Dixie Chicks | |
| March 29 | "Brokenheartsville" | Joe Nichols | |
| April 5 | "Have You Forgotten?" | Darryl Worley | |
| April 12 | "Have You Forgotten?" | Darryl Worley | |
| April 19 | "Have You Forgotten?" | Darryl Worley | |
| April 26 | "Have You Forgotten?" | Darryl Worley | |
| May 3 | "Have You Forgotten?" | Darryl Worley | |
| May 10 | "Have You Forgotten?" | Darryl Worley | |
| May 17 | "Have You Forgotten?" | Darryl Worley | |
| May 24 | "Three Wooden Crosses" | Randy Travis | |
| May 31 | "I Believe" | Diamond Rio | |
| June 7 | "I Believe" | Diamond Rio | |
| June 14 | "Beer for My Horses" | Toby Keith duet with Willie Nelson | |
| June 21 | "Beer for My Horses" | Toby Keith duet with Willie Nelson | |
| June 28 | "Beer for My Horses" | Toby Keith duet with Willie Nelson | |
| July 5 | "Beer for My Horses" | Toby Keith duet with Willie Nelson | |
| July 12 | "Beer for My Horses" | Toby Keith duet with Willie Nelson | |
| July 19 | "Beer for My Horses" | Toby Keith duet with Willie Nelson | |
| July 26 | "My Front Porch Looking In" | Lonestar | |
| August 2 | "Red Dirt Road" | Brooks & Dunn | |
| August 9 | "It's Five O'Clock Somewhere" | Alan Jackson and Jimmy Buffett | |
| August 16 | "It's Five O'Clock Somewhere" | Alan Jackson and Jimmy Buffett | |
| August 23 | "It's Five O'Clock Somewhere" | Alan Jackson and Jimmy Buffett | |
| August 30 | "It's Five O'Clock Somewhere" | Alan Jackson and Jimmy Buffett | |
| September 6 | "It's Five O'Clock Somewhere" | Alan Jackson and Jimmy Buffett | |
| September 13 | "It's Five O'Clock Somewhere" | Alan Jackson and Jimmy Buffett | |
| September 20 | "It's Five O'Clock Somewhere" | Alan Jackson and Jimmy Buffett | |
| September 27 | "What Was I Thinkin'" | Dierks Bentley | |
| October 4 | "It's Five O'Clock Somewhere" | Alan Jackson and Jimmy Buffett | |
| October 11 | "Real Good Man" | Tim McGraw | |
| October 18 | "Real Good Man" | Tim McGraw | |
| October 25 | "Tough Little Boys" | Gary Allan | |
| November 1 | "Tough Little Boys" | Gary Allan | |
| November 8 | "Who Wouldn't Wanna Be Me" | Keith Urban | |
| November 15 | "I Love This Bar" | Toby Keith | |
| November 22 | "I Love This Bar" | Toby Keith | |
| November 29 | "I Love This Bar" | Toby Keith | |
| December 6 | "I Love This Bar" | Toby Keith | |
| December 13 | "I Love This Bar" | Toby Keith | |
| December 20 | "There Goes My Life" | Kenny Chesney | |
| December 27 | "There Goes My Life" | Kenny Chesney | |

== See also ==
- 2003 in music
- List of artists who reached number one on the U.S. country chart
