= Get Off on the Pain =

Studio album by Gary Allan
- Released: March 9, 2010
- Recorded: 2009–2010
- Studio: The Tracking Room, Starstruck Studios, House of Nadia, Little Big Sound Studio and Charlie's Place (Nashville, Tennessee); Fonogenic Studios (Van Nuys, California)
- Genre: Country
- Length: 39:01
- Label: MCA Nashville
- Producer: Gary Allan Greg Droman Mark Wright

Gary Allan chronology
Living Hard (2007)	Get Off on the Pain (2010)	Icon (2012)

Singles from Get Off on the Pain
- 1. "Today" Released: June 29, 2009; 2. "Get Off on the Pain" Released: March 15, 2010; 3. "Kiss Me When I'm Down" Released: September 27, 2010

Get Off on the Pain is the eighth studio album by American country music artist Gary Allan. It was released on March 9, 2010, via MCA Nashville. The album's first single, "Today", was released in June 2009 and was a Top 20 hit. Its second single, the title track, was released on March 15, 2010 and debuted at number 42 on the U.S. Billboard Hot Country Songs chart, and was also a Top 20 Hit. The third single "Kiss Me When I'm Down" was released in September 2010, peaking at #38 on the Hot Country Songs Chart. It became his first album to not produce a Top 10 Hit on the Hot Country Songs Chart.

== Promotion ==
On August 24, 2009, Allan announced his "Get Off on the Pain tour," in promotion of the album. The 25-city tour started on October 14 in Chicago, Illinois, and concluded on December 31 in Las Vegas, Nevada. Special guests on the tour included Justin Moore, Eli Young Band, Jack Ingram, and Stoney LaRue.

== Singles ==
The first single from the album, "Today," was released on June 29, 2009. The music video for the single was filmed live during a performance from his Get Off on the Pain Tour.

The title track was released as the album's second single in March 2010. It debuted at number 42 on the U.S. Billboard Hot Country Songs chart, and peaked at number 18.

The third and final single from the album, "Kiss Me When I'm Down", was released in September 2010. It peaked at number 38 on the country charts.

== Reception ==
=== Commercial ===
Get Off on the Pain debuted at number two on the U.S. Billboard Top Country Albums and number five on the U.S. Billboard 200, selling 65,000 copies in its first week of release. In its second week of release, the album dropped to number sixteen on the Billboard 200 selling 24,341 copies. In its third week of release, the album dropped to number twenty-four on the Billboard 200 selling 15,555 copies. As of August 2010, the album sold 200,395 copies in the U.S.

=== Critical ===
Professional ratings
Review scores
Source	Rating
Allmusic	4/5 stars
American Songwriter	4.5/5 stars
Billboard	(favorable)
Country Weekly	4/5 stars
The New York Times	(favorable)
PopMatters	8/10 stars
Roughstock	4/5 stars
Slant Magazine	4/5 stars
The Washington Post	(favorable)

Upon its release, Get Off on the Pain received generally positive reviews from most music critics. At Metacritic, which assigns a normalized rating out of 100 to reviews from mainstream critics, the album received an average score of 84, based on 5 reviews, which indicates "universal acclaim".

Giving it four stars out of five, Country Weekly reviewer Jessica Phillips said that the album "reveal[s] an even more authentic, intense layer" of Allan's personality. She wrote that the title track "sets the stage" for the rest of the album, but thought that "Kiss Me When I'm Down" had weak lyrics. Allmusic critic Todd Sterling also gave a four-star rating, saying that "Get Off on the Pain is a well-crafted, ten-song collection that, to steal a well-worn phrase, is all killer and no filler" and referred to it as his best album, saying it "will likely go down as one of the best albums of his career".

Matt Bjorke with Roughstock praised the production of the album, saying "The production of the record is killer and serves to enhance everything that makes Gary Allan one of country music’s true gems" and called it one of the years best country albums, saying "IF there’s an artist recording mainstream country records who is as real as Gary Allan, I have yet to see them and if you like authentic, yet modern, country music then Get Off On The Pain is just about as good an album as you’re likely to find this year or any year". Jon Caramanica with The New York Times positively compared Allan to Johnny Cash with the release, and called the years best country album, saying "[Get Off on the Pain] is the year’s best country album so far, almost as brilliantly anguished as Mr. Allan’s 2003 masterpiece, See If I Care." Bill Friskics-Warren with The Washington Post called the album "terrific" saying "Allan's by turns gruff and tender vocals nevertheless are undeniably country, as is the stolid resilience with which he confronts heartache".

Jim Malec with American Songwriter gave the album a 4 ½ rating, lauding the songwriting on the release, calling it "eternally substantive" saying "... he breathes a fresh layer of depth and realism into what might otherwise be well-worn stories". He also acclaimed the honesty of the album, saying "Get Off On the Pain may not be the world’s most uplifting listening experience, but what it lacks in cheer it makes up in truth. For fans who appreciate outstanding country music that deals with real issues, that fact may just make the album’s title a perfectly appropriate statement". Slant Magazine critic Jonathan Keefe also praised Allan's vocal performance on the album, calling Allan "a singer of real grit and depth". He also remarked that the album is "the most consistent set of songs Allan has yet recorded", and rated the album with four stars out of five. Cody Miller with PopMatters gave it an eight star rating saying it was "contender for year’s end best of list; insightful and rare look into a singer’s psyche, a collection of top-grade Country music or soulful purging. All of them apply, and then some".

Jon Caramanica with The New York Times placed the album at number six on his "top 10 albums of 2010" saying "Six years after his wife’s death, Mr. Allan has made music to match the hurt. This country singer had a broken voice long before this album, and a sure way with an aching lyric, but here, optimism appears to have been filtered out, leaving only shadows, where Mr. Allan thrives.

== Track listing ==
No.	Title	Writer(s)	Length
1.	"Get Off on the Pain"	Brett James, Bill Luther, Justin Weaver	3:55
2.	"I Think I've Had Enough"	Brett Eldredge, Pat McLaughlin	3:43
3.	"Today"	Brice Long, Tommy Lee James	3:58
4.	"That Ain't Gonna Fly"	Wes Hightower, Tony Martin	2:57
5.	"Kiss Me When I'm Down"	Andrew Dorff, Josh Kear, Chris Tompkins	3:53
6.	"We Fly by Night"	Allan, Odie Blackmon, Jamie O'Hara	4:39
7.	"When You Give Yourself Away"	Allan, Blackmon, McLaughlin	3:34
8.	"Along the Way"	Allan, Blackmon, Scooter Carusoe	3:48
9.	"She Gets Me"	Allan, Kendell Marvel, Matt Warren	4:00
10.	"No Regrets"	Allan, Jaime Hanna, Jon Randall	4:30
Total length:			39:01

Deluxe Edition
No.	Title	Writer(s)	Length
11.	"Long Summer Days"	Allan, Carusoe, Blackmon	3:10
12.	"Right Where I Need to Be" (live)	Casey Beathard, Marvel	3:35
13.	"Best I Ever Had" (live)	Matt Scannell	4:55
14.	"Watching Airplanes" (live)	Jim Beavers, Jonathan Singleton	4:57
Total length:			55:48

- Live tracks were recorded at House of Blues Chicago in 2009.

== Personnel ==
Production and technical

- Gary Allan – producer
- Mark Wright – producer
- Greg Droman – producer, recording, mixing, additional recording
- Zach Allen – recording assistant
- Leslie Richter – recording assistant
- Aaron Kasdorf – additional recording assistant
- Daewoo Kim – additional recording assistant
- Derek Silverman – additional recording assistant
- Todd Tidwell – additional recording assistant
- Hank Williams – mastering at MasterMix (Nashville, Tennessee)
- Carie Higdon – project coordinator
- Craig Allen – art direction, design
- Joseph Anthony Baker – photography
- Liza Goggins – hair, make-up
- Renee Layher – wardrobe stylist
- John Lytle – management
- Rob Beckham – booking
- Rick Shipp – booking

Musicians and vocalists

- Gary Allan – lead vocals
- Steve Nathan – Hammond B3 organ (1, 3, 8–10), acoustic piano (2, 3, 5–7), keyboards (4), Wurlitzer electric piano (5, 8)
- Rami Jaffee – Hammond B3 organ (7)
- David Steele – electric guitar (1, 3, 5, 7, 9), slide guitar (1, 7)
- John Willis – acoustic guitar
- Kenny Greenberg – electric guitar (2–6, 8, 10)
- Brent Rowan – electric guitar (2–6), baritone guitar (10)
- Greg Droman – electric guitar (7, 10)
- Russ Pahl – banjo (1), steel guitar (2, 3)
- Dan Dugmore – steel guitar (4–10), acoustic guitar (6)
- Michael Rhodes – bass
- Chad Cromwell – drums
- Eric Darken – percussion (1–8, 10), vibraphone (9)
- Stuart Duncan – fiddle (9)
- John Catchings – strings (2, 3, 5)
- Kris Wilkinson – strings (2, 3, 5), string arrangements (2, 3, 5)
- David Angell – strings (2, 3, 5)
- David Davidson – strings (2, 3, 5)
- Mary Kathryn Vanosdale – strings (5)
- Aidan Rowe – copyist (2, 3, 5)
- Charlie Judge – strings (8)
- Perry Coleman – backing vocals (1–3, 6–8, 10)
- Wes Hightower – backing vocals

== Charts ==
Chart performance for Get Off on the Pain
Chart (2010)	Peak position
US Billboard 200	5
US Top Country Albums (Billboard)	2

=== End of year charts ===
Chart (2010)	Year-end 2010
US Billboard 200	167
US Billboard Top Country Albums	30
