= Set You Free (Gary Allan album) =

Studio album by Gary Allan
- Released: January 22, 2013
- Recorded: 2012–2013
- Studios: Tragedy/Tragedy, Robot Lemon, Blackbird Studio and House of Nadia (Nashville, Tennessee)
- Genre: Country
- Length: 46:13
- Label: MCA Nashville
- Producers: Gary Allan; Greg Droman; Jay Joyce; Mark Wright

Gary Allan chronology
Icon (2012)	Set You Free (2013)	Ruthless (2021)

Singles from Set You Free
- 1. "Every Storm (Runs Out of Rain)" Released: September 17, 2012; 2. "Pieces" Released: February 25, 2013; 3. "It Ain't the Whiskey" Released: September 23, 2013

Set You Free is the ninth studio album by American country music artist Gary Allan. It was released on January 22, 2013, by MCA Nashville., and is Allan's first number-one album on the Billboard 200 chart, debuting in the top spot on February 9, 2013. It is also Allan's second number-one album on the Top Country Albums chart, following 2005's Tough All Over. The album produced three singles: "Every Storm (Runs Out of Rain)", "Pieces", and "It Ain't the Whiskey".

== Background ==
Gary Allan talked to The Boot writer Vernell Hackett, and Allan commented on the time during making of this album was one of transition for his label. In addition, Allan noted how he worked with producers in a competitive effort to make this album better.

I recorded the album during the transition of label heads and no one realized what I was doing until I turned it in...When you have one producer, you sometimes allow a song to get in there as an album cut. But with different producers, each one is competing to have the best songs and hopefully songs that are good enough to be released as singles, so I think the overall album and the quality of songs were better because of it. I forced myself to stretch on this one, because I had time, and I think you need to do something new to keep reinventing yourself.

— Gary Allan,

Title

Gary Allan talked to The Boot writer Vernell Hackett, and Allan mentioned the title came from the lead single from the album because it is what the effort as a whole is all about.

That's like the flavor of every song on there...The whole album has hope and was timely for me, too. I've waited a long time to get back on the radio.

— Gary Allan,

Theme

Gary Allan talked to The Boot writer Vernell Hackett, and Allan stated the album's songs are set to the arc of a relationship.

When I got the songs in the order I liked I realized what I had done was create a story line so that it played like a breakup...The first song is 'Tough Goodbye,' and then I went through all the emotions of a breakup, all way to the healing song, 'Good as New.' So the album covers the gamut of a breakup and the first stages of healing.

— Gary Allan,

== Commercial performance ==
On February 9, 2013, Set You Free was the most sold album in the United States by the Billboard 200 chart, as well as the most sold Country Album the same week on the charts. In addition, the album was the second most sold Digital Album, which it was the No. 13 most sold album in Canada, and this was all for this same week on the charts. As of March 6, 2013, the album has sold 219,000 copies.

== Critical reception ==
Professional ratings
Aggregate scores
Source	Rating
Metacritic	(78/100)
Review scores
Source	Rating
About.com	3.5/5 stars
AllMusic	3.5/5 stars
American Songwriter	3.5/5 stars
Got Country Online	5/5 stars
PopMatters	7/10 stars
Rolling Stone	3.5/5 stars
Roughstock	3.5/5 stars
Taste of Country	4.5/5 stars
USA Today	4/4 stars

Upon its release, Set You Free received generally positive reviews from most music critics. At Metacritic, which assigns a normalized rating out of 100 to reviews from mainstream critics, the album received an average score of 78, based on 7 reviews, which indicates "generally favorable reviews".

The album has garnered many positive reviews. Those came in from About.com, AllMusic, American Songwriter, The Boston Globe, Country Weekly, Entertainment Weekly, Got Country Online, The Plain Dealer, PopMatters, Rolling Stone, Roughstock, Taste of Country, and the USA Today. Stephen Thomas Erlewine of AllMusic gave the album a three-and-a-half-out-of-five-star rating, saying that the album is "one where all of his past is present in his assured professionalism." Likewise, American Songwriter music critic Alanna Conaway rated it the same, and wrote that "Set You Free will give his long-time followers more than they could have hoped for, while garnering new fans coast-to-coast." In addition, Stuart Munro of The Boston Globe also rated it the same, which is based on Metacritic's assigned score, and stated that "[Allan] may offer less of an alternative than he once did, but that old-school concern and a wider sonic palette keep Allan just this side of the mainstream." Similarly, Rolling Stone music critic Chuck Eddy gave it the same rating as well, and evoked how "the 45-year-old singer lets the crazy out" on the album. Furthermore, Dan MacIntosh of Roughstock even gave it the same exact rating and wrote that "Many of these song lyrics are intensely self-directed" that are meant for "that tragic guy at the end of the bar" and proclaimed how the album is "fun, but all over before you know it. Then you’re back to crying away your blues." Lastly, About.com music critic Robert Silva rated it the same himself, and noted how "Set You Free can use these jolts of energy, but Allan still seems at his best -- and definitely in his comfort zone -- when he's maudlin, morose, and three sheets to the wind."

The Plain Dealer's Chuck Yarborough graded the album a perfect A+ grade, and alluded to how "'Set You Free' boasts of the typical Allan sound – a sort of lonesome dove lament in his voice – but there’s also an in-your-face stab at belligerence called 'Bones' that runs contrary to form." Bob Paxman of Country Weekly gave the album an A grade and affirmed that "Set You Free doesn't sound like every other album coming out of the Nashville factory these days—and that's definitely a good thing." Paxman went on to describe how "[t]he album flows freely, again as the title might suggest, and the divergent styles truly complement one another." On the other hand, Grady Smith of Entertainment Weekly graded the album a B+ grade, and alluded to "how Gary Allan is beginning to let a small amount of sunshine in."

PopMatters' Matt Cibula give the album a seven-stars-out-of-ten rating and acclaimed that "[t]his album is the truth." Taste of Country's Billy Dukes rated the album even better, giving it a four-and-a-half-out-of-five. He noted how "[e]ach track is a surprise that pays off handsomely when the time is invested." Donna Block of Got Country Online rated in a perfect five-stars and evoked how "[i]t is said a picture is worth a thousand words," and saying, "Here the lyrics sketch out what the music (and Gary’s vocals) paints in bold, rich colors. Here is a mix of old and new country, blended with acceptance and hope throughout." Finally, USA Today music critic Brian Mansfield also rated it a perfect four star effort, and wrote, "It's a hard-won hope. Brooding songs, like the one where's he's digging a grave for an unsuspecting, unfaithful love, are as scary as hell." Mansfield concluded saying, "Gary Allan has [...] lived a life that most other country acts can, well, only sing about. That's why the cracks in Allan's voice convey experience, not affection, and why he doesn't have to sing about how country he is for everyone to know."

== Track listing ==
No.	Title	Writer(s)	Producer(s)	Length
1.	"Tough Goodbye"	Josh Thompson, Tony Martin	Jay Joyce	3:14
2.	"Every Storm (Runs Out of Rain)"	Gary Allan, Hillary Lindsey, Matt Warren	Allan, Greg Droman	3:46
3.	"Bones"	Keith Gattis	Allan, Droman	3:54
4.	"It Ain't the Whiskey"	Greg Barnhill, Jim Daddario, Cole Deggs	Joyce	4:20
5.	"Sand in My Soul"	Brad Warren, Brett Warren, Blair Daly	Allan, Droman	3:19
6.	"You Without Me"	Allan, John Lancaster, Rachel Proctor	Allan, Droman	3:55
7.	"One More Time"	Allan, Lindsey, M. Warren	Joyce	5:25
8.	"Hungover Heart"	James Leblanc, M. Warren	Allan, Mark Wright	3:48
9.	"No Worries"	Allan, Odie Blackmon, Pat McLaughlin	Allan, Wright	3:18
10.	"Drop"	Joel Shewmake, Bruce Wallace, Brian Gene White	Joyce	4:15
11.	"Pieces"	Allan, Blackmon, Sarah Buxton	Joyce	3:24
12.	"Good as New"	Billy Burnette, McLaughlin	Allan, Wright	3:35
Total length:				46:13

== Personnel ==
Musicians

- Gary Allan – lead vocals, acoustic guitar (1, 4, 7, 10, 11), electric guitar (1, 4, 7, 10, 11)
- Giles Reaves – acoustic piano (1, 4, 7, 10, 11), Fender Rhodes (1, 4, 7, 10, 11), synthesizers (1, 4, 7, 10, 11), Hammond B3 organ (1, 4, 7, 10, 11), drums (1, 4, 7, 10, 11), percussion (1, 4, 7, 10, 11), xylophone (1, 4, 7, 10, 11)
- John Lancaster – acoustic piano (2, 3, 5, 6), Wurlitzer electric piano (2, 3, 5, 6), keyboards (2, 3, 5, 6), Hammond B3 organ (2, 3, 5, 6), organ (2, 3, 5, 6)
- Steve Nathan – Wurlitzer electric piano (8, 9, 12), Hammond B3 organ (8, 9, 12), synthesizers (8, 9, 12)
- Jedd Hughes – acoustic guitar (1, 4, 7, 10, 11), electric guitar (1, 4, 7, 10, 11)
- Jay Joyce – acoustic guitar (1, 4, 7, 10, 11), electric guitar (1, 4, 7, 10, 11)
- Rob McNelley – electric guitar (1, 4, 7, 10, 11)
- Tom Bukovac – electric guitar (2, 3, 5, 6, 8, 9, 12), acoustic guitar (8, 9, 12)
- Levi Dennis – acoustic guitar (2, 3, 5, 6), fiddle (2, 3, 5, 6), viola (2, 3, 5, 6)
- Greg Droman – 12-string guitar (2, 3, 5, 6), electric guitar (2, 3, 5, 6, 8, 9, 12)
- Jaime Hanna – acoustic guitar (2, 3, 5, 6)
- David Steele – acoustic guitar (2, 3, 5, 6), electric guitar (2, 3, 5, 6)
- Kenny Greenberg – electric guitar (8, 9, 12)
- Ilya Toshinsky – acoustic guitar (8, 9, 12), hi-string acoustic guitar (8, 9, 12), mandolin (8, 9, 12), ukulele (8, 9, 12)
- Russ Pahl – pedal steel guitar (1, 4, 7, 10, 11), steel guitar (8, 9, 12)
- Dan Dugmore – steel guitar (2, 3, 5, 6)
- C.J. Udeen – steel guitar (2, 3, 5, 6)
- Lee Hendricks – bass (1, 4, 7, 10, 11)
- Michael Rhodes – bass (2, 3, 5, 6, 8, 9, 12)
- Craig Wright – drums (1, 4, 7, 10, 11), percussion (1, 4, 7, 10, 11)
- Chad Cromwell – drums (2, 3, 5, 6, 8, 9, 12)
- Eric Darken – percussion (8, 9, 12)
- Matt Warren – harmonica (2, 3, 5, 6)
- David Angell – strings (12)
- David Davidson – strings (12)
- Sarighani Reist – strings (12)
- Kristin Wilkinson – strings (12), string arrangements (12)

Background vocalists

- Jaime Hanna – backing vocals (1–7, 10, 11)
- Jay Joyce – backing vocals (1, 4, 7, 10, 11)
- Gary Allan – backing vocals (2, 3, 5, 6, 8, 9, 12)
- Levi Dennis – backing vocals (2, 3, 5, 6)
- John Lancaster – backing vocals (2, 3, 5, 6)
- Hillary Lindsey – backing vocals (2, 3, 5, 6)
- Rachel Proctor – backing vocals (2, 3, 5, 6)
- David Steele – backing vocals (2, 3, 5, 6)
- Perry Coleman – backing vocals (8, 9, 12)
- Vicki Hampton – backing vocals (8, 9, 12)
- Wes Hightower – backing vocals (8, 9, 12)
- Marilyn Martin – backing vocals (8, 9, 12)
- Cindy Richardson-Walker – backing vocals (8, 9, 12)

=== Production ===
- Scott Johnson – production assistant (1, 4, 7, 10, 11)
- Carie Higdon – project coordinator (2, 3, 5, 6)
- Hannah Sanford – production assistant (8, 9, 12)
- Karen Naff – art direction
- Craig Allen – design
- Eric Adkins – photography
- Lorrie Turk – hair, make-up
- Renee Layher – wardrobe stylist
- John Lytle – management

Technical credits

- Hank Williams – mastering at MasterMix (Nashville, Tennessee)
- Jason Hall – recording (1, 4, 7, 10, 11)
- F. Reid Shippen – mixing (1, 4, 7, 10, 11)
- Greg Droman – recording (2, 3, 5, 6, 8, 9, 12), mixing (2, 3, 5, 6, 8, 9, 12)
- Matthew Wheeler – recording assistant (1, 4, 7, 10, 11)
- Erik "Keller" Jahner – mix assistant (1, 4, 7, 10, 11)
- Lowell Reynolds – recording assistant (2, 3, 5, 6, 8, 9, 12)

== Charts ==
=== Weekly charts ===
Chart (2013)	Peak position
Canadian Albums Chart	13
US Billboard 200	1
US Billboard Top Country Albums	1
US Billboard Top Digital Albums	2

=== Year-end charts ===
Chart (2013)	Position
US Billboard 200	87
US Top Country Albums (Billboard)	21
