= Used Heart for Sale =

Studio album by Gary Allan
- Released: September 24, 1996
- Studio: Javelina Studios (Nashville, Tennessee); Sound Kitchen (Franklin, Tennessee)
- Genre: Country
- Length: 29:56
- Label: Decca Nashville
- Producer: Mark Wright Byron Hill

Gary Allan chronology
Used Heart for Sale (1996)	It Would Be You (1998)

Singles from Used Heart for Sale
- 1. "Her Man" Released: August 27, 1996; 2. "Forever and a Day" Released: January 18, 1997; 3. "From Where I'm Sitting" Released: May 10, 1997; 4. "Living in a House of Love" Released: September 27, 1997

Professional ratings
Review scores
Source	Rating
Allmusic	2.5/5 stars

Used Heart for Sale is the debut studio album by American country music singer Gary Allan. It was released on September 24, 1996, via Decca Records Nashville. The album has been certified gold by the RIAA. It produced four singles on the U.S. Billboard Hot Country Songs chart with "Her Man", "Living in a House Full of Love", "From Where I'm Sitting", and "Forever and a Day". "Her Man" reached the Top 10 on the country charts at #7, while none of the other three singles reached Top 40.

Several of the songs on this album are covers, including two its singles. "Her Man" was previously recorded by Waylon Jennings on his 1990 album The Eagle, and "Living in a House Full of Love" was previously a number 3 hit for David Houston back in 1965. In addition, "Wine Me Up" is a cover of Faron Young's hit single.

== Track listing ==
No.	Title	Writer(s)	Length
1.	"Send Back My Heart"	John David, George Ducas	3:16
2.	"Her Man"	Kent Robbins	2:44
3.	"Forever and a Day"	Jim Lauderdale, Frank Dycus	2:39
4.	"Living in a House of Love"	Billy Sherrill, Glenn Sutton	2:19
5.	"All I Had Going Is Gone"	Mark Wright, Ronnie Rogers	2:54
6.	"Used Heart for Sale"	Gary Allan, Jake Kelly	2:26
7.	"Of All the Hearts"	Byron Hill, J. Remington Wilde	2:43
8.	"From Where I'm Sitting"	Garth Brooks, Kent Maxon	4:02
9.	"Wine Me Up"	Faron Young, Bill Deaton	2:20
10.	"Wake Up Screaming"	Lauderdale, John Leventhal	4:40
Total length:			29:56

== Charts ==
Chart performance for Used Heart for Sale
Chart (1996–1997)	Peak position
US Billboard 200	136
US Top Country Albums (Billboard)	20
US Heatseekers Albums (Billboard)	4

== Certifications ==
Region	Certification
United States (RIAA)	Gold

== Personnel ==
- Gary Allan – lead vocals
- Steve Nathan – keyboards
- Dan Dugmore – acoustic guitar, steel guitar
- Jake Kelly – acoustic guitar
- B. James Lowry – acoustic guitar
- Brent Rowan – electric guitars
- Michael Rhodes – bass
- Owen Hale – drums
- Hank Singer – fiddle
- Jim Lauderdale – backing vocals
- Liana Manis – backing vocals
- John Wesley Ryles – backing vocals
- Curtis Young – backing vocals

=== Production ===
- Byron Hill – producer
- Mark Wright – producer
- Greg Droman – recording, mixing
- Robert Charles – overdub recording
- Joe Hayden – recording assistant
- Rhett Travis – overdub assistant
- Tim Coyle – mix assistant
- Hank Williams – mastering at MasterMix (Nashville, Tennessee)
- Travis Hill – production coordinator
- Gina R. Binkley – art direction, design
- Ron Keith – photography
- Debra Wingo – imaging
- Trish Townsend – stylist
