= Kiss Me When I'm Down =

Single by Gary Allan

from the album Get Off on the Pain
- Released: September 27, 2010
- Recorded: 2010
- Genre: Country
- Length: 3:52
- Label: MCA Nashville
- Songwriters: Andrew Dorff; Josh Kear; Chris Tompkins
- Producers: Gary Allan; Greg Droman; Mark Wright

Gary Allan singles chronology
"Get Off on the Pain" (2010)	"Kiss Me When I'm Down" (2010)	"Every Storm (Runs Out of Rain)" (2012)

"Kiss Me When I'm Down" is a song written by Andrew Dorff, Josh Kear, and Chris Tompkins and recorded by American country music singer Gary Allan. It was released in September 2010 as the third and final single from Allan's 2010 album Get Off on the Pain.

== Critical reception ==
Stormy Lewis of Roughstock calls the song “Another brilliant song to add to the cannon of amazing Gary Allan singles,” and gave it a five out of five star rating. Jim Malec of American Noise says that the lyrics are “Great. Not good, great,” and says the song “Deserves every single bit of acclaim and attention it will receive,” and gives the song a thumbs up.

== Chart performance ==
Chart (2010–2011)	Peak position
US Hot Country Songs (Billboard)	38
