= It Would Be You =

Studio album by Gary Allan
- Released: May 19, 1998
- Recorded: 1998
- Studio: Javelina Studios and House of Gain (Nashville, Tennessee); Sound Kitchen (Franklin, Tennessee)
- Genre: Country
- Length: 42:31
- Label: Decca Nashville
- Producer: Mark Wright Byron Hill

Gary Allan chronology
Used Heart for Sale (1996)	It Would Be You (1998)	Smoke Rings in the Dark (1999)

Singles from It Would Be You
- 1. "It Would Be You" Released: February 10, 1998; 2. "No Man in His Wrong Heart" Released: August 27, 1998; 3. "I'll Take Today" Released: November 7, 1998

Professional ratings
Review scores
Source	Rating
AllMusic	3/5 stars
Entertainment Weekly	A

It Would Be You is the second studio album by American country music singer Gary Allan. It was released on May 19, 1998, as his last studio album for the Decca Records Nashville label. After that album's release, Decca Records Nashville closed, and Allan subsequently transferred to Decca’s parent label MCA Records Nashville. The album produced three singles with the title track, "No Man in His Wrong Heart", and "I'll Take Today". The title track was Allan's second Top 10 hit on the U.S. Billboard Hot Country Songs chart at number 7.

== Content ==
"No Judgement Day", the final track on this album, is a hidden track. Written by Allen Shamblin, this song is based on the true story of a restaurant owner in Texas who was murdered by a former employee and two accomplices in search of money. It plays a minute after the last listed song, "Forgotten But Not Gone", finishes.

Just like Allan's previous album, several songs on this album were originally recorded by other artists. "Don't Leave Her Lonely Too Long" was written by Marty Stuart, whose original recording (from his 1990 album Hillbilly Rock) was a number 42 hit on the country charts in 1989. "She Loves Me (She Don't Love You)" was originally recorded by Conway Twitty, and later by George Strait on his 1990 album Livin' It Up. In addition, the single "I'll Take Today" was originally recorded by Tanya Tucker on her 1994 album Fire to Fire, and by Ty England on his 1996 album Two Ways to Fall. "Forgotten but Not Gone" was originally a single for Keith Palmer in 1991 on his self-titled debut album. "It Took Us All Night Long to Say Goodbye" was originally recorded by Johnny Rodriguez on his 1975 album Love Put a Song in My Heart, and later by Texas country singer Danny Wood as a non-album single in 1980 that peaked #37 on the US Hot Country Songs chart. "I've Got a Quarter in My Pocket" was later recorded by fellow artist Mark Chesnutt as the opening track to his 2016 album Tradition Lives.

== Track listing ==
No.	Title	Writer(s)	Length
1.	"It Would Be You"	Dana Hunt Black, Kent Robbins	2:55
2.	"No Man in His Wrong Heart"	Trey Bruce, Ronnie Rogers	4:13
3.	"Don't Leave Her Lonely Too Long"	Kostas, Marty Stuart	3:35
4.	"I'll Take Today"	Bill Robinson, Robbins	2:57
5.	"I Ain't Runnin' Yet"	Gary Nicholson, Jamie O'Hara	4:27
6.	"She Loves Me (She Don't Love You)"	Conway Twitty	3:22
7.	"I've Got a Quarter in My Pocket"	Billy Yates, Jake Kelly	2:34
8.	"Baby I Will"	Gary Allan, Odie Blackmon, Kelly	3:12
9.	"Red Lips, Blue Eyes, Little White Lies"	Kostas, Brent Moyer	3:00
10.	"It Took Us All Night Long to Say Goodbye"	Wayland Holyfield, Bob McDill	3:02
11.	"Forgotten, But Not Gone"	Buzz Cason, Johnny MacRae	3:15
12.	"No Judgement Day" (hidden track)	Allen Shamblin	4:53
Total length:			42:31

== Personnel ==
- Gary Allan – lead vocals
- John Barlow Jarvis – acoustic piano, Hammond B3 organ
- Steve Nathan – acoustic piano, Wurlitzer electric piano, Hammond B3 organ, synthesizers
- Jake Holder – electric guitars, guitar solos
- Jake Kelly – acoustic guitar
- B. James Lowry – 9-string acoustic guitar, acoustic guitar
- Rivers Rutherford – additional acoustic guitar
- Brent Rowan – electric guitars, tic tac bass
- Dan Dugmore – steel guitar
- Paul Franklin – steel guitar
- Michael Rhodes – bass
- Chad Cromwell – drums
- Tom Roady – percussion
- Glen Duncan – fiddle
- Hank Singer – fiddle
- John Wesley Ryles – backing vocals
- Harry Stinson – backing vocals
- Dennis Wilson – backing vocals
- Curtis Young – backing vocals

=== Production ===
- Byron Hill – producer
- Mark Wright – producer
- Greg Droman – recording, mixing
- Robert Charles – second engineer, vocal overdubs
- Tim Coyle – second mix engineer
- Hank Williams – mastering at MasterMix (Nashville, Tennessee)
- John Drioli – project coordinator
- Brandi Thomas – project coordinator
- E.J. Camp – photography
- Gina R. Binkley – design
- Debra Wingo – imaging
- Susan Bessire – stylist

== Charts ==
Chart performance for It Would Be You
Chart (1998)	Peak position
US Billboard 200	132
US Top Country Albums (Billboard)	21
US Heatseekers Albums (Billboard)	2
