= Get Off on the Pain (song) =

Single by Gary Allan

from the album Get Off on the Pain
- Released: March 15, 2010
- Recorded: 2009
- Genre: Country
- Length: 3:55
- Label: MCA Nashville
- Songwriters: Brett James; Bill Luther; Justin Weaver
- Producers: Gary Allan; Greg Droman; Mark Wright

Gary Allan singles chronology
"Today" (2009)	"Get Off on the Pain" (2010)	"Kiss Me When I'm Down" (2010)

"Get Off on the Pain" is a song written by Brett James, Bill Luther and Justin Weaver, and recorded by American country music singer Gary Allan. It was released in March 2010 as the second single and title track from his 2010 album of the same name. The song is Allan's twenty-fourth single release overall.

== Critical reception ==
Of the song, Brian Mansfield of USA Today cited the lyric "I don't know why my life sounds like a heartbroke country song" as setting the tone of the album, saying, "Allan sides with long shots, dark horses and lost causes more apt to revel in their misery than celebrate their good fortune." Country Weekly reviewer Jessica Phillips described the track as "set[ting] the stage" for the rest of the album. Bobby Peacock of Roughstock gave the single four-and-a-half stars out of five, saying that it "suits him in a way that very few of his previous singles have ever done."

== Chart performance ==
"Get Off on the Pain" debuted at number 42 on the U.S. Billboard Hot Country Songs for the week of April 3, 2010. Like his previous hit, "Today," this song peaked at number 18 on the country chart.

Chart (2010)	Peak position
US Hot Country Songs (Billboard)	18
US Billboard Bubbling Under Hot 100	1
