= Alright Guy =

Studio album by Gary Allan
- Released: October 2, 2001
- Recorded: 2001
- Studio: Sound Kitchen (Nashville, Tennessee); Javelina (Nashville, Tennessee)
- Genre: Country
- Length: 41:37
- Label: MCA Nashville
- Producer: Tony Brown; Mark Wright

Gary Allan chronology
Smoke Rings in the Dark (1999)	Alright Guy (2001)	See If I Care (2003)

Singles from Alright Guy
- 1. "Man of Me" Released: July 7, 2001; 2. "The One" Released: January 14, 2002; 3. "Man to Man" Released: September 30, 2002

Professional ratings
Review scores
Source	Rating
Allmusic	2.5/5 stars

Alright Guy is the fourth studio album by American country music singer Gary Allan. It was released in October 2001 via MCA Records Nashville. It produced three singles. The album's first single, "Man of Me", reached number 18 on the US Billboard Hot Country Songs charts. The second single, "The One", became Allan's second Top 5 hit with a peak at number 3. The third and final single, "Man to Man", became Allan's first number one hit. Like his previous album, Smoke Rings in the Dark (1999), Alright Guy was also certified platinum by the RIAA.

The title track was written by Todd Snider and originally appeared on his 1994 album Songs for the Daily Planet. "What I'd Say" was a number 1 hit for Earl Thomas Conley in 1989 from his 1988 album The Heart of It All. "What's on My Mind" was later recorded by Blake Shelton on his 2004 album Blake Shelton's Barn & Grill. "What Would Willie Do" had been released a month prior by the songwriter, Bruce Robison, on his 2001 Country Sunshine album.

== Track listing ==
No.	Title	Writer(s)	Length
1.	"Man to Man"	Jamie O'Hara	3:43
2.	"The Devil's Candy"	Harley Allen, Carson Chamberlain	2:32
3.	"What I'd Say"	Robert Byrne, Will Robinson	3:38
4.	"Man of Me"	George Teren, Rivers Rutherford	3:28
5.	"Adobe Walls"	Roger Brown, Luke Reed	4:17
6.	"What's on My Mind"	Jim Lauderdale, Leslie Satcher	3:00
7.	"Alright Guy"	Todd Snider	4:22
8.	"The One"	Karen Manno, Billy Lee	4:19
9.	"I'm Doin' My Best"	Rutherford, Annie Tate, Sam Tate	3:46
10.	"I Don't Look Back"	Gary Allan, Odie Blackmon, Jake Kelly	3:04
11.	"What Would Willie Do"	Bruce Robison	5:28
Total length:			41:37

12. "Runaway" [Bonus track on European release] (Del Shannon, Max Crook) - 2:45

== Personnel ==
- Gary Allan – lead vocals
- Steve Nathan – keyboards
- Jake Kelly – acoustic guitar
- Joe Manuel – acoustic guitar
- John Willis – acoustic guitar
- Brent Rowan – electric guitars
- Robby Turner – steel guitar
- Hank Singer – mandolin, fiddle
- Michael Rhodes – bass
- Chad Cromwell – drums
- John Wesley Ryles – backing vocals
- Harry Stinson – backing vocals

=== Production ===
- Tony Brown – producer
- Mark Wright – producer
- Odie Blackmon – associate producer (1–11)
- Byron Hill – associate producer (12)
- Greg Droman – recording, overdub recording, mixing
- Todd Gunnerson – recording assistant
- Robert Charles – additional engineer
- Justin Niebank – additional engineer
- Hank Williams – mastering at MasterMix (Nashville, Tennessee)
- Jessie Noble – project coordinator
- Tony Baker – photography
- Craig Allen – design
- Katie Gillon – creative director
- Suzy Kipp – stylist
- John Lytle for Lytle Management Group – management

== Charts ==
=== Weekly charts ===
Chart (2001)	Peak position
UK Country Albums Chart (OCC)	6
US Billboard 200	39
US Top Country Albums (Billboard)	4

=== Year-end charts ===
Chart (2002)	Position
Canadian Country Albums (Nielsen SoundScan)	71
US Top Country Albums (Billboard)	23
Chart (2003)	Position
US Top Country Albums (Billboard)	38

== Certifications ==
Region	Certification
United States (RIAA)	Platinum

== See also ==
- AOL Music
