= A Feelin' Like That =

Single by Gary Allan

from the album Greatest Hits
- Released: October 23, 2006
- Recorded: September 2006
- Genre: Country
- Length: 3:32
- Label: MCA Nashville
- Songwriters: Ira Dean; David Lee Murphy; Kim Tribble
- Producers: Mark Wright; Gary Allan

Gary Allan singles chronology
"Life Ain't Always Beautiful" (2006)	"A Feelin' Like That" (2006)	"Watching Airplanes" (2007)

"A Feelin' Like That" is a song written by Ira Dean, David Lee Murphy, and Kim Tribble, and recorded by American country music artist Gary Allan. It was released in October 2006 as the only single from his first Greatest Hits compilation album. It peaked at number 12 on the U.S. country chart, and at number 71 on the Hot 100.

== Critical reception ==
Brody Vercher of Engine 145 called "A Feelin' Like That", "a quintessential Gary Allan song about 'a guy who has done it all and seen it all' but can’t find anything that gives him the same feeling as a former love that he left behind.

== Chart positions ==
"A Feelin' Like That" debuted at number 54 on the U.S. Billboard Hot Country Singles & Tracks for the week of November 4, 2006.

Chart (2006–2007)	Peak position
Canada Country (Billboard)	15
US Hot Country Songs (Billboard)	12
US Billboard Hot 100	94

=== Year-end charts ===
Chart (2007)	Position
US Country Songs (Billboard)	47
