= Do You Wish It Was Me? =

Single by Gary Allan
- Released: June 13, 2016
- Genre: Country
- Length: 2:52
- Label: EMI Nashville
- Songwriters: Gary Allan; Andrew Dorff; Jonathan Singleton
- Producers: Gary Allan; Greg Droman

Gary Allan singles chronology
"Hangover Tonight" (2015)	"Do You Wish It Was Me?" (2016)	"Mess Me Up" (2017)

"Do You Wish It Was Me?" is a song recorded by American country music artist Gary Allan. It was released on June 13, 2016. Allan co-produced the song with Greg Droman and co-wrote it alongside Andrew Dorff and Jonathan Singleton.

The song was intended for a then-unfinished upcoming album, but was ultimately not featured on his next album, Ruthless, in 2021.

== History ==
"Do You Wish It Was Me?" was shipped to country radio on May 23, 2016, before being released digitally on June 10 and going for radio adds on June 13.

The song was recorded with Allan's touring band, rather than session musicians.

== Critical reception ==
Rolling Stone said the song "sticks to the uptempo groove-fueled vibe of 'Hangover Tonight', just with a woman, rather than whiskey, providing the poison."

== Personnel ==
Credits adapted from Tidal.

- Gary Allan – lead vocals, production
- Greg Droman – production, engineer, mixer
- Levi Dennis – acoustic guitar, viola
- Jaime Hanna – background vocals
- Brian Arsenault – background vocals
- Larry Babb – drums
- Ryan Wariner – electric guitar
- Tom Bukovac – electric guitar
- John Lancaster – Hammond B3 organ, mellotron, synthesizer

== Charts ==
Chart performance for "Do You Wish It Was Me?"
Chart (2016)	Peak position
US Country Airplay (Billboard)	57
