= Hangover Tonight =

Single by Gary Allan
- Released: March 2, 2015
- Recorded: 2015
- Genre: Country
- Length: 3:32
- Label: MCA Nashville
- Songwriters: Gary Allan; Chris Stapleton; Cary Barlowe; Jesse Frasure
- Producers: Gary Allan; Greg Droman

Gary Allan singles chronology
"It Ain't the Whiskey" (2013)	"Hangover Tonight" (2015)	"Do You Wish It Was Me?" (2016)

"Hangover Tonight" is a song co-written and recorded by American country music artist Gary Allan. It was released on March 2, 2015 as the intended lead single to his next album project. The song was written by Allan, Chris Stapleton, Cary Barlowe, and Jesse Frasure.

== History ==
On his website, Allan said of the song: "I’m super excited about this single going to radio. I feel like this is the fourth or fifth time I’ve reinvented myself, or tried to push myself to do different things. I feel like I have pushed myself into a very comfortable place because it is kind of 50’s and 60’s Motown. It reminds me of when I did 'Runaway' and things like that. So it was a very easy thing for me to do. I was in rockabilly bands my whole life, and to me it was just a throwback to my youth writing with these guys. It was a lot of fun."

== Critical reception ==
An uncredited review from Taste of Country stated that "Like he did with 'Every Storm (Runs Out of Rain),' Allan returns with a song no one was expecting. The singer continues to reinvent himself, even if that means going back to what many fans fell in love with a decade ago." Tammy Ragusa of Country Weekly rated it "A", saying that it "is a solid country love song…set to a retro-Motown funk groove. Paired with plenty of electric guitar, organ, throwback wah-wah and Gary's signature gravelly vocal, this tune is dead sexy."

== Music video ==
The music video was directed by Stephen Shepherd and premiered in June 2015.

== Chart performance ==
Chart (2015)	Peak position
US Hot Country Songs (Billboard)	49
US Country Airplay (Billboard)	41
