= Songs About Rain =

Single by Gary Allan

from the album See If I Care
- Released: November 17, 2003
- Recorded: 2003
- Genre: Country
- Length: 4:25 (album version); 3:55 (radio edit)
- Label: MCA Nashville
- Songwriters: Pat McLaughlin; Liz Rose
- Producers: Mark Wright; Gary Allan

Gary Allan singles chronology
"Tough Little Boys" (2003)	"Songs About Rain" (2003)	"Nothing On but the Radio" (2004)

"Songs About Rain" is a song written by Pat McLaughlin and Liz Rose and recorded by American country music artist Gary Allan. It was released in November 2003 as the second single from Allan's 2003 album See If I Care. The song peaked at number 12 on the U.S. Billboard Hot Country Singles & Tracks chart and at number 71 on the U.S. Billboard Hot 100 chart.

== Content ==
In the song, the narrator describes how he is driving around in circles, having nothing to do but to think about the one who left him. He notes that he heard she has just married another man, and it has affected him more than he thought. The radio's continual playing of "songs about rain" is not helping the situation.

== Critical reception ==
David Jeffries of Allmusic called the song "slow" and "epic" and stated that the song is further proof Allan is a "master balladeer". Michael Paoletta, of Billboard magazine also reviewed the song favorably saying that "Allan delivers an aching, poignant vocal that wrings every drop of emotion from the lyric." He also says that the writers should "get brownie points for reminding listeners of those great tunes."

In 2024, Rolling Stone ranked the song at #76 on its 200 Greatest Country Songs of All Time ranking.

== Cultural references ==
As the title suggests, the song mentions the titles of several songs that talk about rain. Among the songs mentioned are "Rainy Night in Georgia," "Kentucky Rain," "Blue Eyes Crying in the Rain," "Early Morning Rain" and "Here Comes That Rainy Day Feeling Again."

== Music video ==
The music video for the song was directed by Morgan Lawley, who directed Allan's three previous videos. It is a sequel to the "Man of Me" video, and was filmed in black-and-white in the Florida Everglades. Some shots in this video are a repetition of shots in that video, which brings the concept full circle. The same actress from "Man of Me" plays the woman in this video.

== Chart performance ==
"Songs About Rain" debuted at number 51 on the U.S. Billboard Hot Country Singles & Tracks for the week of November 22, 2003.

=== Weekly charts ===
Chart (2003–2004)	Peak position
Canada Country (Radio & Records)	10
US Hot Country Songs (Billboard)	12
US Billboard Hot 100	71

=== Year-end charts ===
Chart (2004)	Rank
US Country Songs (Billboard)	46

== Certifications ==
Region	Certification	Certified units/sales
United States (RIAA)	Gold	500,000^{‡}
^{‡} Sales+streaming figures based on certification alone.
