= Today (Gary Allan song) =

Single by Gary Allan

from the album Get Off on the Pain
- Released: June 29, 2009
- Recorded: 2009
- Genre: Country
- Length: 3:58
- Label: MCA Nashville
- Songwriters: Tommy Lee James; Brice Long
- Producer: Mark Wright

Gary Allan singles chronology
"She's So California" (2008)	"Today" (2009)	"Get Off on the Pain" (2010)

"Today" is a song written by Brice Long and Tommy Lee James, and recorded by American country music artist Gary Allan. It was released in June 2009 as the first single from his 2010 album Get Off on the Pain. The song reached number 18 on the U.S. Billboard Hot Country Songs chart in early 2010.

== Content ==
The song's narrator claims that he lost his lover and everything that he ever wanted "today" when he sees his former lover marrying another man:

During the week of October 19, Allan talked about the single on Jeff Foxworthy's Foxworthy Countdown: "It’s one of those songs that you missed it with that girl, that’s the girl you always thought you should have (been) with and you let her slip through your fingers and now she is happy as hell and doesn’t think about you ever[…]And we’ve all got one of those girls in our past!"

== Critical reception ==
Leeann Ward of Country Universe gave the song a C+ rating, and said in her review of the song: "With a moody piano to serve as the foundation for the swelling strings and over all dramatic angst, Allan sings of the pain of loosing [sic] his former lover to another man", but added, "it is severely weakened by a disappointingly generic, overblown production." Engine 145 critic Juli Thanki gave the song a thumbs-up; while her review describes the production as "slick" and "boring", she also says, "Luckily Allan’s beautiful rasp rises above these shortcomings as he manages to simultaneously sound brokenhearted, regretful, and maybe just a little pissed off." Matt Bjorke of Roughstock also gave a favorable review, saying "it is nice to hear a smoldering ballad of regret from one of the best vocalists in modern country music", although he added that he did not consider the song's theme original.

== Chart performance ==
"Today" debuted at number 52 on the U.S. Billboard Hot Country Songs chart on July 4, 2009, and peaked at number 18 in February 2010. It also debuted at number 6 on the U.S Billboard Bubbling Under Hot 100 chart for the week for March 9, 2010.

Chart (2009–2010)	Peak position
US Hot Country Songs (Billboard)	18
US Billboard Bubbling Under Hot 100	6
