= Ruthless (Gary Allan album) =

Studio album by Gary Allan
- Released: June 25, 2021
- Recorded: 2013–January 2020
- Studio: Blackbird (Berry Hill, Tennessee)
- Genre: Country
- Length: 46:18
- Label: EMI Nashville
- Producer: Gary Allan; Tony Brown; Greg Droman; Jay Joyce; Mark Wright

Gary Allan chronology
Set You Free (2013)	Ruthless (2021)

Singles from Ruthless
- 1. "Waste of a Whiskey Drink" Released: September 14, 2020

Ruthless is the tenth studio album by American country music artist Gary Allan, released on June 25, 2021, by EMI Nashville. It is Allan's first album of new material in over eight years since Set You Free was released in 2013.

== History ==
Between 2015 and 2020, Allan released a number of singles that did not appear on albums due to their poor chart performance. In May 2021, he previewed the track "Temptation" online and announced that his new album would be coming out in June.

Allan co-produced the album with Tony Brown, Mark Wright, Greg Droman, and Jay Joyce. He recorded over thirty songs across multiple sessions between 2013 and 2020 and selected thirteen of them to make up the album. The last songs were done in January 2020, before the COVID-19 pandemic. Many of the musicians who played on Allan's 1999 album, Smoke Rings in the Dark, also contributed.

On the creation of the album, Allan said:

This is a montage of everything I have done since my last album. It's what I love. I remain influenced by the '90s—as well as the '80s. Twenty-six tracks were cut for this album. Then I went back to the studio and recorded three or four more tracks. Then I returned for two more. From each of these many sessions, I stripped out the cool stuff I wanted on the record.

The album's lead single, "Waste of a Whiskey Drink", was released in digitally in July 2020, and impacted radio on September 14, 2020.

The album was released on vinyl on October 22, 2021.

== Critical reception ==
Professional ratings
Review scores
Source	Rating
AllMusic	3.5/5 stars
Slant Magazine	1.5/5 stars

Stephen Thomas Erlewine of AllMusic gave Ruthless three and a half stars out of five and described the album as "steeped in the rocking country of the 1990s", while also pointing out Allan's "older...but not tired" sound.

Jim Malec of Slant Magazine gave the album one and a half stars out of five. Malec called the album a "casually sexist exercise in mediocrity" by criticizing his portrayal of women as nothing more than objects of the male gaze.

== Track listing ==
Ruthless track listing
No.	Title	Writer(s)	Producer(s)	Length
1.	"Temptation"	Nicolle Galyon; Chase McGill; Jon Nite	Tony Brown; Mark Wright	2:55
2.	"Waste of a Whiskey Drink"	Josh Kear; Michael Hardy; Mark Holman	Brown; Wright	3:24
3.	"Till It Felt Like You"	Kyle Jacobs; Joe Leathers; Matt Warren	Gary Allan; Greg Droman	3:41
4.	"Slide"	Ross Ellis; Alex Kline; Michael Whitworth	Brown; Wright	3:05
5.	"Pretty Damn Close"	Gary Allan; Sarah Buxton; Rodney Clawson	Allan; Droman	3:45
6.	"High as I've Ever Been"	M. Warren; James T. Slater; Skip Black	Allan; Droman	3:53
7.	"What I Can't Talk About"	Jim Beavers; Lindsay Rimes; Matt Rogers	Allan; Droman	4:02
8.	"SEX"	Galyon; Shane McAnally; Matt Jenkins	Brown; Wright	3:03
9.	"Trouble Knows Trouble"	Steve Bogard; Jason Sever; John Edwards	Brown; Wright	3:28
10.	"Ruthless"	Hillary Lindsey; busbee; Ryan Hurd	Brown; Wright	3:37
11.	"Unfiltered"	Blair Daly; Brad Warren, Brett Warren	Jay Joyce	3:19
12.	"Little Glass of Wine"	Jesse Winchester	Allan; Droman	4:06
13.	"The Hard Way"	M. Warren; Carey Ott	Allan; Droman	4:00
Total length:				46:18

== Personnel ==
Credits are adapted from Tidal.

=== Musicians ===
- Gary Allan – vocals, acoustic guitar (11)
- John Lancaster – acoustic piano (1, 3, 5), synthesizers (1, 2, 7, 9, 13), Hammond B3 organ (3, 5–7), Wurlitzer electric piano (4, 6, 10, 12), organ (13)
- Steve Nathan – keyboards (1), acoustic piano (2), Hammond B3 organ (4, 10), synthesizers (8), Wurlitzer electric piano (9)
- David Huff – programming (1)
- Jay Joyce – keyboards (11), programming (11), electric guitar (11), tambourine (11)
- Tom Bukovac – electric guitar (1, 3–9, 13), acoustic guitar (2, 7)
- Rob McNelley – electric guitar (1, 4, 8), acoustic guitar (2, 9)
- David Steele – electric guitar (3, 5, 6, 12, 13)
- Tim Galloway – acoustic guitar (3, 5, 12, 13)
- Greg Droman – acoustic 12-string guitar (3), electric bass (3)
- Ryan Warner – electric guitar (7, 11), slide guitar (7)
- Anthony Rankin – acoustic guitar (11), electric guitar (11), backing vocals (11)
- Dan Dugmore – steel guitar (1, 2, 4–6, 8–10, 12), acoustic guitar (2, 8), dobro (4, 10), lap steel guitar (6), pedal steel guitar (6)
- C. J. Udeen – pedal steel guitar (11)
- Michael Rhodes – bass guitar (1–6, 8–10, 13)
- Brian Arsenault – bass guitar (7, 11, 12)
- Chad Cromwell – drums (1–6, 8–10, 13), percussion (6)
- Larry Babb – drums (7, 11, 12)
- Steve Marcantonio – tambourine (2, 10), percussion (4)
- Eric Darken – percussion (3, 13)
- Levi Dennis – fiddle (6, 12), acoustic guitar (7), viola (7)
- Carole Rabinowitz – cello (1)
- Kristin Wilkinson – viola (1), string arrangements and direction (1)
- David Angell – violin (1)
- David Davidson – violin (1)
- Conni Ellisor – violin (1)
- Alicia Enstrom – violin (1)
- Jim Hoke – horns (10), horn direction (10)
- Steve Herrman – horns (10)
- Sarah Buxton – backing vocals (1, 2, 4, 8–10)
- Perry Coleman – backing vocals (1, 2, 4, 8–10)
- Jaime Hanna – backing vocals (3, 5–7)
- Marilyn Martin – backing vocals (3, 12)
- Ron Ellis – backing vocals (4)

=== Technical ===
- Jay Joyce – production, mixing, recording
- Greg Droman – production, mixing
- Gary Allan – production
- Tony Brown – production
- Mark Wright – production
- Steve Marcantonio – mixing, recording
- Seth Morton – assistant engineer, assistant recording
- Jimmy Mansfield – assistant engineer, assistant recording
- Jason Hall – engineer

== Charts ==
Chart performance for Ruthless
Chart (2021)	Peak position
US Billboard 200	86
US Top Country Albums (Billboard)	8
US Top Album Sales (Billboard)	6

== Release history ==
Release dates and formats for Ruthless
Region	Date	Format(s)	Label(s)	Ref.
Various	June 25, 2021	Digital download, CD	EMI Nashville	
United States	October 22, 2021	Vinyl	EMI Nashville	
