= Man of Me =

Single by Gary Allan

from the album Alright Guy
- B-side: "Sorry"
- Released: July 7, 2001
- Recorded: 2001
- Genre: Country
- Length: 3:27
- Label: MCA Nashville
- Songwriters: Rivers Rutherford, George Teren
- Producers: Tony Brown, Mark Wright

Gary Allan singles chronology
"Right Where I Need to Be" (2000)	"Man of Me" (2001)	"The One" (2002)

"Man of Me" is a song written by Rivers Rutherford and George Teren and recorded by American country music artist Gary Allan. It was released in July 2001 as the first single from Allan's 2001 album Alright Guy. The song reached number 18 on the U.S. Billboard Hot Country Singles & Tracks chart.

== Chart performance ==
Chart (2001)	Peak position
US Hot Country Songs (Billboard)	18
US Bubbling Under Hot 100 (Billboard)	7
