= Tough All Over (Gary Allan album) =

Studio album by Gary Allan
- Released: October 11, 2005
- Recorded: 2005
- Studio: Sound Kitchen (Nashville, Tennessee); House of Gain (Nashville, Tennessee); East Iris (Nashville, Tennessee)
- Genre: Country
- Length: 47:13
- Label: MCA Nashville
- Producer: Gary Allan; Mark Wright

Gary Allan chronology
See If I Care (2003)	Tough All Over (2005)	Greatest Hits (2007)

Singles from Tough All Over
- 1. "Best I Ever Had" Released: May 23, 2005; 2. "Life Ain't Always Beautiful" Released: January 17, 2006

Tough All Over is the sixth studio album by American country music artist Gary Allan. It was released on October 11, 2005, through MCA Nashville. Allan co-produced alongside longtime collaborator Mark Wright. The album featured two top-ten singles on the Billboard Hot Country Songs: "Best I Ever Had" and "Life Ain't Always Beautiful". The album was certified gold by the Recording Industry Association of America (RIAA).

Recorded after his wife's suicide, the album's songs were regarded as "excruciatingly sad".

== Critical reception ==
Professional ratings
Review scores
Source	Rating
AllMusic	3.5/5 stars
Entertainment Weekly	A
PopMatters	8/10
Slant Magazine	3.5/5 stars
Rolling Stone	3/5 stars

Thom Jurek of AllMusic gave the album three-and-a-half stars out of five, calling the record Allan's "most consistent—yet slick—record he's ever done", with specific praise towards emotional tracks like "Promise Broken", "Life Ain't Always Beautiful", and "What Kind of Fool". Alanna Nash of Entertainment Weekly gave the album an A, calling the album a "bold album of soul-piercing beauty". Roger Holland of PopMatters praised the album's emotional depth, but had criticism for tracks like "He Can't Quit Her", which failed to fit into the overall context of the album, and "What Kind of Fool", which Holland described as a "blend of '80s pop devices and Orbison-style country [that] fits Gary Allan like a child's glove and sends your fingers scurrying off in search of the skip button". Jonathan Keefe of Slant Magazine gave the album three-and-a-half stars out of five, calling Allan's sound and emotions on the album as "the sound of a phenomenal talent at his most emotionally raw".

The Engine 145 country music blog ranked it number seven on the "Top Country Albums of the Decade" list. Author Jim Malec stated "Allan pours his battered spirit into Tough All Over, and while it's far from an uplifting experience it's one that is fully worth the emotional wear." Linda Ryan of Rhapsody also ranked the album as the seventh best of the decade, praising Allan's "gift of conveying emotions like regret, heartbreak, and emptiness." Kevin John Coyne of Country Universe gave the album its highest ranking as the third best of the decade, behind Kasey Chambers and Shane Nicholson's Rattlin' Bones and the Dixie Chicks' Home.

== Track listing ==
No.	Title	Writer(s)	Length
1.	"Tough All Over"	Odie Blackmon; Jim Lauderdale	3:21
2.	"Best I Ever Had"	Matt Scannell	4:11
3.	"I Just Got Back from Hell"	Gary Allan; Harley Allen	4:03
4.	"Ring"	Kostas	3:47
5.	"Promise Broken"	Margaret Findley; Deric Ruttan	3:11
6.	"Nickajack Cave (Johnny Cash's Redemption)"	Jamie O'Hara	4:15
7.	"Life Ain't Always Beautiful"	Cyndi Goodman; Tommy Lee James	3:44
8.	"He Can't Quit Her"	Casey Beathard; Ed Hill	3:32
9.	"What Kind of Fool"	O'Hara	3:57
10.	"Puttin' Memories Away"	Allan; Matt Warren	3:32
11.	"No Damn Good"	Allan; Blackmon; O'Hara	3:44
12.	"Putting My Misery on Display"	Allan	6:07
Total length:			47:13

== Personnel ==
As listed in liner notes.

- Gary Allan – lead vocals
- Steve Nathan – acoustic piano, synthesizers, Hammond B3 organ
- Reese Wynans – Hammond B3 organ (3, 10)
- Jake Kelly – acoustic guitar
- Brent Rowan – electric guitars
- John Willis – acoustic guitar
- Kenny Greenberg – acoustic guitar (2), electric guitars (2, 7, 8, 12)
- Robby Turner – steel guitar
- Michael Rhodes – bass
- Chad Cromwell – drums
- Eric Darken – percussion
- Hank Singer – fiddle
- Kirk "Jelly Roll" Johnson – harmonica (1, 7)
- Nashville String Machine – strings (7)
- David Campbell – string arrangements (7)
- Carl Gorodetzky – string contractor (7)
- Perry Coleman – backing vocals (1–6, 8, 10, 11)
- John Wesley Ryles – backing vocals (1, 3, 6, 7, 10, 11)
- Wes Hightower – backing vocals (2, 4, 12)
- Russell Terrell – backing vocals (2, 4)

=== Production ===
- Gary Allan – producer
- Mark Wright – producer
- Greg Droman – recording, mixing
- Steve Beers – assistant engineer, additional recording
- Todd Gunnerson – assistant engineer, additional recording, mix assistant
- Sang Park – mix assistant
- Jeff Balding – string recording (7)
- Jed Hackett – string recording assistant (7)
- Hank Williams – mastering at MasterMix (Nashville, Tennessee)
- Carie Higdon – project coordinator
- Craig Allen – art direction, design
- Tony Baker – photography
- Rachel Stolte – hair, make-up
- Renee Layher – wardrobe stylist
- John Lytle – management

== Charts ==
=== Weekly charts ===
Chart (2005)	Peak position
US Billboard 200	3
US Top Country Albums (Billboard)	1

=== Year-end charts ===
Chart (2005)	Position
US Top Country Albums (Billboard)	52
Chart (2006)	Position
US Billboard 200	176
US Top Country Albums (Billboard)	31

== Certifications ==
Certifications for Tough All Over
Region	Certification	Certified units/sales
United States (RIAA)	Gold	500,000^{^}
^{*} Sales figures based on certification alone.
