= See If I Care (album) =

Studio album by Gary Allan
- Released: September 30, 2003
- Recorded: 2003
- Studio: Javelina Studios, Sound Kitchen, House of Gain and Paragon Studios (Nashville, Tennessee)
- Genre: Country
- Length: 41:11
- Label: MCA Nashville
- Producer: Mark Wright Gary Allan

Gary Allan chronology
Alright Guy (2001)	See If I Care (2003)	Tough All Over (2005)

Singles from See If I Care
- 1. "Tough Little Boys" Released: June 23, 2003; 2. "Songs About Rain" Released: November 17, 2003; 3. "Nothing On but the Radio" Released: June 21, 2004

Professional ratings
Review scores
Source	Rating
Allmusic	4/5 stars

See If I Care is the fifth studio album by American country music artist Gary Allan. It was released in September 2003 via MCA Nashville. The album spawned three singles with "Tough Little Boys", "Songs About Rain", and "Nothing On but the Radio", all of which charted in the Top 15 on the US Billboard Hot Country Songs chart. "Tough Little Boys" and "Nothing On but the Radio" both reached number one while "Songs About Rain" peaked at number 12. The album was certified platinum by the RIAA.

The album's title track was previously recorded by Mike Walker on his self-titled debut album. The song "A Showman's Life" was originally recorded by the songwriter, Jesse Winchester, on his 1978 album A Touch on the Rainy Side and was subsequently recorded by George Strait on his 2011 album Here for a Good Time.

== Track listing ==
No.	Title	Writer(s)	Length
1.	"Drinkin' Dark Whiskey"	Chris Stapleton, Mike Henderson	3:01
2.	"Can't Do It Today"	John Rich, Vicky McGehee, Rodney Clawson	3:26
3.	"Tough Little Boys"	Harley Allen, Don Sampson	3:57
4.	"See If I Care"	Jamie O'Hara	3:39
5.	"Songs About Rain"	Pat McLaughlin, Liz Rose	4:25
6.	"I Can Love You"	Shawn Camp, Philip White	2:51
7.	"Don't Look Away"	Sean Locke, Hardy McGee	4:32
8.	"Guys Like Me"	Kostas, Trent Summar	2:58
9.	"Nothing On but the Radio"	Odie Blackmon, Byron Hill, Brice Long	3:32
10.	"You Don't Know a Thing About Me"	O'Hara, Blackmon, Gary Allan	4:18
11.	"A Showman's Life" (duet with Willie Nelson)	Jesse Winchester	4:32
Total length:			41:11

== Personnel ==
Musicians

- Gary Allan – vocals
- Steve Nathan – acoustic piano, Wurlitzer electric piano, Hammond B3 organ
- Jim Hoke – accordion (5, 8), harmonica (11)
- Jake Kelly – acoustic guitars
- Brent Rowan – electric guitars
- John Willis – acoustic guitars
- Mike Henderson – electric guitar (1)
- Richard Bennett – electric guitar (6)
- Willie Nelson – acoustic guitar (11)
- Dan Dugmore – steel guitar (1, 5, 7, 8, 10, 11)
- Robby Turner – steel guitar (2–4, 6, 9)
- Michael Rhodes – bass
- Chad Cromwell – drums
- Eric Darken – percussion
- Hank Singer – fiddle (1, 2, 4–11), mandolin (5)
- Stuart Duncan – fiddle (3)

Background vocalists

- John Wesley Ryles – backing vocals (1–5, 7, 9)
- Chris Stapleton – backing vocals (1)
- Harry Stinson – backing vocals (2–7, 9, 10)
- Lisa Cochran – backing vocals (6)
- Marabeth Jordan – backing vocals (6)
- Bergen White – backing vocals (6)
- Jim Lauderdale – backing vocals (8)
- Jamie O'Hara – backing vocals (10)

=== Production ===
- Clay Bradley – A&R direction
- Gary Allan – producer
- Mark Wright – producer
- Greg Droman – recording, mixing
- Todd Gunnerson – additional engineer, additional recording
- Ronnie Thomas – editing
- Hank Williams – mastering
- MasterMix (Nashville, Tennessee) – editing and mastering location
- Carie Higdon – project coordinator
- Craig Allen – art direction, design
- Karen Naff – art direction
- Tony Baker – photography
- Renee Layher – wardrobe
- Rachel Stolte – hair, make-up
- John Lytle – management

== Charts ==
=== Weekly charts ===
Chart (2003)	Peak position
US Billboard 200	17
US Top Country Albums (Billboard)	2

=== Year-end charts ===
Chart (2003)	Position
US Top Country Albums (Billboard)	52
Chart (2004)	Position
US Billboard 200	186
US Top Country Albums (Billboard)	27
Chart (2005)	Position
US Top Country Albums (Billboard)	59

== Certifications ==
Region	Certification
United States (RIAA)	Platinum
