= It Ain't the Whiskey =

Single by Gary Allan

from the album Set You Free
- Released: September 23, 2013
- Recorded: 2013
- Genre: Country
- Length: 4:21
- Label: MCA Nashville
- Songwriters: Greg Barnhill, Jim Daddario, Cole Deggs
- Producer: Jay Joyce

Gary Allan singles chronology
"Pieces" (2013)	"It Ain't the Whiskey" (2013)	"Hangover Tonight" (2015)

"It Ain't the Whiskey" is a song written by Greg Barnhill, Jim Daddario and Cole Deggs, and recorded by American country music singer Gary Allan. It is the third and final single from his 2013 album Set You Free. To date, this is Allan's final top 40 single.

== Content ==
The song is a ballad with a "gnawing guitar solo and steel" that takes place at an Alcoholics Anonymous meeting. In it, the male narrator states that his life problems are not caused by substance abuse, but rather by a lost love.

== Critical reception ==
Billy Dukes of Taste of Country wrote that "After two uplifting singles, Gary Allan has become the dark, heartbroken and wretched singer his fans have loved for over a decade. ‘It Ain’t the Whiskey’ is his bread and butter, and the singer sounds better than ever on this highlight from the ‘Set You Free’ album." Joseph Hudak of Country Weekly rated it "A", saying that "Yet for all of the intrinsic sadness of the lyrics…and the hypnotic production, the song doesn’t plod or bore. Rather, it captivates."

== Music video ==
The song's music video was released in December 2013. It is shot in black-and-white, and alternates between shots of Allan performing the song with his band, and shots of him portraying a character "who has lost love".

== Chart performance ==
Chart (2013–2014)	Peak position
US Hot Country Songs (Billboard)	40
US Country Airplay (Billboard)	36

== Certifications ==
Certifications for It Ain't the Whiskey
Region	Certification	Certified units/sales
United States (RIAA)	Gold	500,000^{‡}
^{‡} Sales+streaming figures based on certification alone.
