= The One (Gary Allan song) =

Single by Gary Allan

from the album Alright Guy
- B-side: "I'm Doin' My Best"
- Released: January 14, 2002
- Recorded: 2001
- Genre: Country
- Length: 4:19
- Label: MCA Nashville 172232
- Songwriters: Karen Manno, Billy Lee
- Producers: Tony Brown; Mark Wright

Gary Allan singles chronology
"Man of Me" (2001)	"The One" (2002)	"Man to Man" (2002)

"The One" is a song written by Karen Manno and Billy Lee and recorded by American country music singer Gary Allan. It was released in January 2002 as the second single from album's 2001 album Alright Guy. The song reached number 3 on the U.S. Billboard Hot Country Singles & Tracks chart. It also entered the Top 40 on the Billboard Hot 100, making this Allan's first Top 40 hit on that chart.

== Content ==
The song is a ballad, in which the narrator offers to wait patiently for the woman he loves to return his affection.

== Music video ==
The accompanying music video for this song was directed by Morgan Lawley and premiered in April 2002. It was filmed on location in on a set in Los Angeles. It features Allan driving in a truck, and with his lover in various places, including a house, flea market, and street corner.

== Critical reception ==
Rick Cohoon of Allmusic gave the song a positive review. He called it "one of [Allan's] most romantic love ballads." He also stated that "without the vocals, the words seem a bit sappy and over-dramatic."

== Chart performance ==
"The One" debuted at number 56 on the U.S. Billboard Hot Country Singles & Tracks for the week of January 19, 2002.

Chart (2002)	Peak position
Canada Radio (Nielsen BDS)	50
Canada Country (Nielsen BDS)	4
US Hot Country Songs (Billboard)	3
US Billboard Hot 100	37

=== Year-end charts ===
Chart (2002)	Position
US Hot Country Songs (Billboard)	13
