= Nothing On but the Radio =

Single by Gary Allan

from the album See If I Care
- Released: June 21, 2004
- Recorded: 2003
- Genre: Country
- Length: 3:32
- Label: MCA Nashville
- Songwriters: Byron Hill; Brice Long; Odie Blackmon
- Producers: Mark Wright; Gary Allan

Gary Allan singles chronology
"Songs About Rain" (2003)	"Nothing On but the Radio" (2004)	"Best I Ever Had" (2005)

"Nothing On but the Radio" is a song written by Byron Hill, Odie Blackmon, and Brice Long and recorded by American country music artist Gary Allan. It was released in June 2004 as the third and last single from Allan's 2003 album See If I Care. The song became Allan's third number one hit on the U.S. Billboard Hot Country Songs chart in December 2004, and it would be his last until "Every Storm (Runs Out of Rain)" reached that position in 2013. The song also peaked at number 32 on the U.S. Billboard Hot 100 chart. The song even won an ASCAP Award for being among the most performed country songs of 2005. The song was later included on Allan's Greatest Hits album.

== Content ==
The narrator talks about dancing with his lover with "nothing on but the radio".

== Critical reception ==
Deborah Evans Price of Billboard magazine reviewed the song favorably, calling the lyric a "light and breezy look at the beginnings of a new relationship. It's nothing deep, just frisky and fun." She goes on to say that the lead guitar starts the song and the melody "immediately catches listeners' attention-and the steel guitar and fiddle-laced production set the perfect stage for Allan's country-boy vocal."

== Chart performance ==
"Nothing On but the Radio" debuted at number 52 on the U.S. Billboard Hot Country Songs for the week of June 26, 2004.

Chart (2004–2005)	Peak position
Canada Country (Radio & Records)	6
US Hot Country Songs (Billboard)	1
US Billboard Hot 100	32

=== Year-end charts ===
Chart (2004)	Position
US Country Songs (Billboard)	40

Chart (2005)	Position
US Country Songs (Billboard)	52

== Certifications ==
Region	Certification	Certified units/sales
United States (RIAA)	Gold	500,000^{‡}
^{‡} Sales+streaming figures based on certification alone.
