= Every Storm (Runs Out of Rain) =

Single by Gary Allan

from the album Set You Free
- Released: September 17, 2012
- Recorded: 2012
- Genre: Country
- Length: 3:46
- Label: MCA Nashville
- Songwriters: Gary Allan; Hillary Lindsey; Matt Warren
- Producers: Gary Allan; Greg Droman

Gary Allan singles chronology
"Kiss Me When I'm Down" (2010)	"Every Storm (Runs Out of Rain)" (2012)	"Pieces" (2013)

"Every Storm (Runs Out of Rain)" is a song co-written and recorded by American country music artist Gary Allan. It was released in September 2012 as the first single from his album Set You Free. Allan wrote the song with Hillary Lindsey and Matt Warren.

== Content ==
This song is a mid-tempo mainly accompanied by electric guitar. In it, the narrator expresses hope on situations improving, saying that "every storm runs, runs out of rain". The song set is in the key of A minor with a main chord pattern of Am-F-C-G. Co-writer Hillary Lindsey sings backing vocals.

== Critical reception ==
Billy Dukes of Taste of Country gave the song four stars out of five, writing that "it’s his unique style and ability to mix gravel with rose petals that makes him such a treasured original." Matt Bjorke of Roughstock gave the song a favorable review, saying that "the California native brings oodles of charisma to a melodic heartbreak of a story that uses a storm as a metaphor for the life of a relationship."

== Music video ==
The music video was directed by Stephen Shepherd and premiered in December 2012.

== Chart performance ==
"Every Storm (Runs Out of Rain)" debuted at number 55 on the US Billboard Hot Country Songs chart for the week of September 15, 2012. It also debuted at number 78 on the US Billboard Hot 100 chart for the week of October 20, 2012. It also debuted at number 93 on the Canadian Hot 100 chart for the week of October 20, 2012. The song has since become Allan's first top 10 country hit since "Watching Airplanes" reached number 2 in early 2008. It became his fourth number-one single on both the Country Songs and Country Airplay charts, both dated February 9, 2013, and his first since "Nothing On but the Radio" in December 2004. The song has sold over a million copies in the US as of March 2013.

== Charts and certifications ==
=== Weekly charts ===
Chart (2012–2013)	Peak position
Canada Hot 100 (Billboard)	41
Canada Country (Billboard)	1
US Billboard Hot 100	26
US Hot Country Songs (Billboard)	1
US Country Airplay (Billboard)	1

=== Year-end charts ===
Chart (2013)	Position
US Country Airplay (Billboard)	44
US Hot Country Songs (Billboard)	24

=== Certifications ===
Region	Certification	Certified units/sales
United States (RIAA)	2× Platinum	1,082,000
