= Her Man (song) =

Single by Gary Allan

from the album Used Heart for Sale
- B-side: "Wake Up Screaming"
- Released: August 27, 1996
- Recorded: 1996
- Genre: Country
- Length: 2:44
- Label: Decca 55227
- Songwriter: Kent Robbins
- Producers: Mark Wright; Byron Hill

Gary Allan singles chronology
"Her Man" (1996)	"Forever and a Day" (1997)

"Her Man" is a song written by Kent Robbins. Originally recorded by American country music artist Waylon Jennings on his 1990 album The Eagle, it was later covered in 1996 by Gary Allan on his debut album Used Heart for Sale. Allan's version was released in August 1996 as his debut single and as the album's first. His rendition peaked at number 7 on the US country singles charts and number 9 in Canada.

== Content ==
In the song, the narrator decides to change his ways of life for the one that he loves ("But startin' today, all I'm gonna be is her man").

== Critical reception ==
Deborah Evans Price, of Billboard magazine reviewed the song favorably, saying that Allan's "solid country voice turns in a thoughtful, believable performance on this song about a man who has let his woman down and is now determined that "starting today, all I'm gonna be is her man.'"

== Music video ==
The music video was directed by Gerry Wenner and premiered in August 1996. The house that the video was shot at was the house they rented in Nashville.

The video starts out with Gary Allan sleeping in a sofa. Inside his home, which is messy. Then, the sunlight wakes him up, and he sits up and adjusts his hat. He looks at the trashy room, and he takes a container off of a picture of a woman in a picture frame. Then he gets up and looks at the messy room again. Then, he goes over and turns the TV off. He goes to the kitchen by taking pictures of him with the woman off a fridge. Then, he throws a bowl full of pretzels away in the trashcan. While a man (Jake Kelly) plays guitar on the sofa. Then Gary Allan throws the rest of the messy stuff in the trashcan. Then, a dog stands on the sofa watching Gary and Jake carry out a pinball machine outside. Then, Gary gives Jake the trash bag, and closes the door. Gary goes through the photos of a woman and him, and putting each of them into a pile after going through one at a time. Then, we see Gary putting on a pair of yellow rubber gloves, and then, we see him pulling the cord to a lawnmower and gets ready to mow. Then inside we see Gary taking out the trash, sweeping the floor, and playing his guitar, and then, he hears the woman knocking on the door. Then he goes over to a candle and lights it up and goes over to the door and hugs her.

== Charts ==
"Her Man" debuted at number 67 on the U.S. Billboard Hot Country Singles & Tracks for the week of August 24, 1996.

Chart (1996–1997)	Peak position
Canada Country Singles (RPM)	9
US Hot Country Songs (Billboard)	7

== Certifications ==
Region	Certification	Certified units/sales
United States (RIAA)	Gold	500,000^{‡}
^{‡} Sales+streaming figures based on certification alone.
