= Life Ain't Always Beautiful =

Single by Gary Allan

from the album Tough All Over
- Released: January 17, 2006
- Recorded: 2005
- Genre: Country
- Length: 3:44
- Label: MCA Nashville
- Songwriters: Cyndi Goodman, Tommy Lee James
- Producers: Mark Wright, Gary Allan

Gary Allan singles chronology
"Best I Ever Had" (2005)	"Life Ain't Always Beautiful" (2006)	"A Feelin' Like That" (2006)

"Life Ain't Always Beautiful" is a song written by Cyndi Goodman and Tommy Lee James, and recorded by American country music singer Gary Allan. It was released in January 2006 as the second and final single from his album Tough All Over. The song became Allan's ninth Top 10 hit on the U.S. Billboard Hot Country Songs chart with a peak at number 4.

== Content ==
The song is a ballad, in which the narrator talks about the realities of life, despite the peaks and valleys we go through. The narrator states that "Life isn't always beautiful / But it's a beautiful ride."

== Critical reception ==
Matt Bjorke of Roughstock reviewed the song favorably, calling it "a poignant song sung softly and tenderly by an emotional vocalist."

== Music video ==
The music video for this song features Gary singing the song in Las Vegas. It was directed by Paul Boyd.

== Chart performance ==
The song debuted at number 58 on the Hot Country Songs chart dated January 21, 2006. It charted for 33 weeks on that chart, and reached a peak of number 4 on the chart dated August 19, 2006. In addition, it peaked at number 61 on the Billboard Hot 100.

Chart (2006)	Peak position
Canada Country (Billboard)	20
US Hot Country Songs (Billboard)	4
US Billboard Hot 100	61

=== Year-end charts ===
Chart (2006)	Position
US Country Songs (Billboard)	23

== Certifications ==
Certifications for Life Ain't Always Beautiful
Region	Certification	Certified units/sales
United States (RIAA)	Gold	500,000^{‡}
^{‡} Sales+streaming figures based on certification alone.
