= Tough Little Boys =

Single by Gary Allan

from the album See If I Care
- B-side: "I Can Love You"
- Released: June 23, 2003
- Recorded: 2003
- Genre: Country
- Length: 3:57
- Label: MCA Nashville 000946
- Songwriters: Don Sampson, Harley Allen
- Producers: Mark Wright, Gary Allan

Gary Allan singles chronology
"Man to Man" (2002)	"Tough Little Boys" (2003)	"Songs About Rain" (2003)

"Tough Little Boys" is a song written by Harley Allen and Don Sampson and recorded by American country music artist Gary Allan. It was released in June 2003 as the first single from Allan's 2003 album See If I Care. The song became Allan's second number one hit on the U.S. Billboard Hot Country Songs chart in October 2003.

== Content ==
The song, backed primarily by acoustic guitar and keyboard, is about a father who has always imagined himself to be tough, even as a child. However, upon looking at his own child, the father starts finding himself worrying about the child's safety, admitting that "When tough little boys grow up to be dads / They turn into big babies again." The song's chorus references the young adult novel Old Yeller with the line "Now I didn't cry when Old Yeller died / At least not in front of my friends."

== Critical reception ==
Jennifer Webb of About.com reviewed the song favorably, calling it "touching and tender."

== Music video ==
The music video was directed by Morgan Lawley, and premiered in mid-2003. It was filmed at the Tennessee National Air Force Base, and features actual soldiers returning from and during wartime, and their daughters, who come out and hug them in the end. Gary is seen performing the song in an air force treatment tent with an acoustic guitar, and in an airport hangar with an electric guitar, while videos of the soldiers on screens behind him are playing. His own daughter Dallas makes a cameo as well. He dedicated the video to all the soldiers who fought and continue to fight for their country, with a note at the end of the video saying "This video is dedicated to all the soldiers, who left their families, to fight for our country."

== Chart positions ==
"Tough Little Boys" debuted at number 45 on the U.S. Billboard Hot Country Songs chart for the week of June 28, 2003.

Chart (2003)	Peak position
US Hot Country Songs (Billboard)	1
US Billboard Hot 100	32

=== Year-end charts ===
Chart (2003)	Position
US Country Songs (Billboard)	30
