= Best I Ever Had (Grey Sky Morning) =

2001 single by Vertical Horizon

Single by Vertical Horizon

from the album Everything You Want
- Released: January 8, 2001
- Length: 4:30
- Label: RCA
- Songwriter: Matt Scannell
- Producers: Mark Endert; Ben Grosse

Vertical Horizon singles chronology
"You're a God" (2000)	"Best I Ever Had (Grey Sky Morning)" (2001)	"I'm Still Here" (2003)

"Best I Ever Had (Grey Sky Morning)" is a song recorded by American alternative rock band Vertical Horizon on their third album Everything You Want, which was released in 1999. It was released as a single in 2001. It served as the band's fourth overall single.

== Charts ==
=== Weekly charts ===
Chart (2001)	Peak position
New Zealand (Recorded Music NZ)	42
US Billboard Hot 100	58
US Adult Pop Airplay (Billboard)	7
US Pop Airplay (Billboard)	28

=== Year-end charts ===
Chart (2001)	Position
US Adult Top 40 (Billboard)	24

== Release history ==
Region	Date	Format(s)	Label(s)	Ref.
United States	January 8, 2001	Hot adult contemporary radio	RCA	
United States	January 9, 2001	Contemporary hit radio	RCA	

== Gary Allan version ==
"Best I Ever Had"

Single by Gary Allan

from the album Tough All Over
- Released: May 23, 2005
- Genre: Country
- Length: 4:11
- Label: MCA Nashville
- Songwriter: Matt Scannell
- Producers: Mark Wright; Gary Allan

Gary Allan singles chronology
"Nothing On but the Radio" (2004)	"Best I Ever Had" (2005)	"Life Ain't Always Beautiful" (2006)

In 2005, country music singer Gary Allan covered the song for his 2005 album Tough All Over. His version, entitled "Best I Ever Had" was released as the album's first single and became his eighth top-10 hit on the US Billboard Hot Country Songs charts, with a peak at No. 7 in late 2005.

=== Music video ===
The video was directed by Paul Boyd and filmed at the Salton Sea.

=== Chart performance ===
"Best I Ever Had" debuted at No. 56 on the US Billboard Hot Country Songs for the week of June 11, 2005. It quickly became Allan's best-selling single and remained as such until 2012.

==== Weekly charts ====
Chart (2005)	Peak position
Canada Country (Radio & Records)	6
US Hot Country Songs (Billboard)	7
US Billboard Hot 100	51
US Pop 100 (Billboard)	55

==== Year-end charts ====
Chart (2005)	Position
US Country Songs (Billboard)	45

=== Certifications ===
Region	Certification	Certified units/sales
United States (RIAA)	Platinum	1,000,000^{‡}
^{‡} Sales+streaming figures based on certification alone.
