= Man to Man (Gary Allan song) =

Single by Gary Allan

from the album Alright Guy
- Released: September 30, 2002
- Recorded: 2001
- Genre: Country
- Length: 3:43
- Label: MCA Nashville
- Songwriter: Jamie O'Hara
- Producers: Tony Brown; Mark Wright

Gary Allan singles chronology
"The One" (2002)	"Man to Man" (2002)	"Tough Little Boys" (2003)

"Man to Man" is a song written by Jamie O'Hara and recorded by American country music artist Gary Allan. It was released in September 2002 as the third and final single from Allan's 2001 album Alright Guy. The song became his first number one hit on the U.S. Billboard Hot Country Songs chart in March 2003 and peaked at number 25 on the Billboard Hot 100.

== Content ==
The song's narrator tells his significant other's ex-boyfriend that it was his fault that she had left him and that it's too late to get her back. He states that they should have a conversation "man to man."

== Critical reception ==
Rick Cohoon of Allmusic in his review, states that the lyrics are "harsh and realistic" but "maybe a bit too glib for Allan’s good." Cohoon states that "‘You want her back, and it’s too late/why don’t we call a spade a spade’ summarizes the song’s tone, but comes across as too abrasive." He states that the writing makes it seem like the situation could have happened to the writer, Jamie O'Hara.

== Chart positions ==
"Man to Man" debuted at number 45 on the U.S. Billboard Hot Country Songs for the week of October 5, 2002.

Chart (2002–2003)	Peak position
Canada Country (Nielsen BDS)	1
US Hot Country Songs (Billboard)	1
US Billboard Hot 100	25

=== Year-end charts ===
Chart (2003)	Position
US Country Songs (Billboard)	15
