= Gary Allan =

American country singer (born 1967)

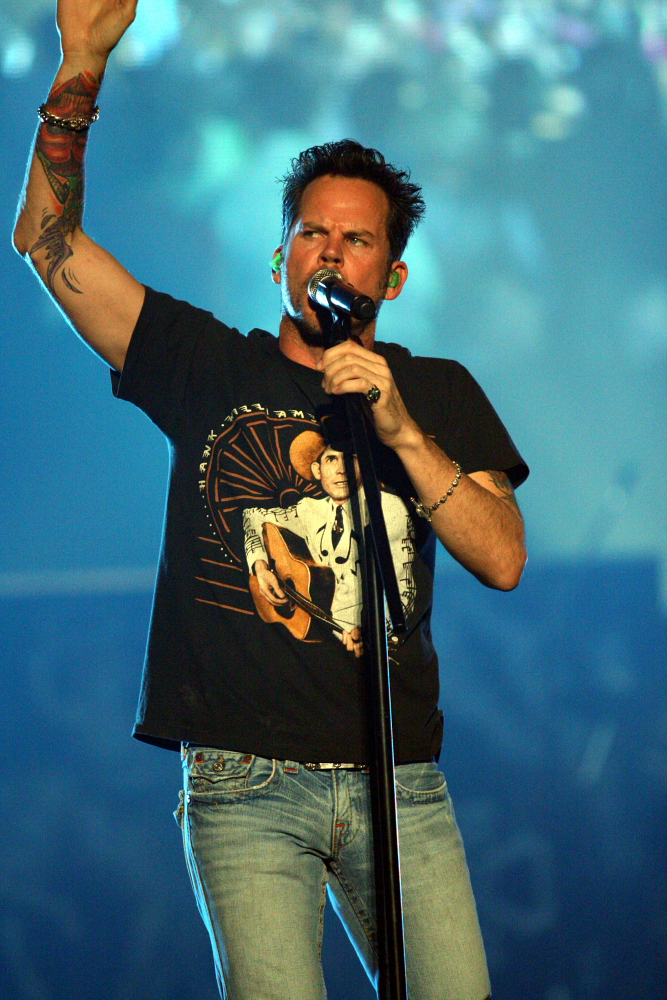
- Allan performing on tour with Keith Urban, 2007

Background information
- Born: Gary Allan Herzberg; December 5, 1967 (age 58); La Mirada, California, U.S.
- Genres: Country
- Occupations: Singer, songwriter
- Instruments: Vocals; guitar
- Years active: 1996–present
- Labels: Decca Nashville; MCA Nashville; EMI Nashville
- Website: garyallan.com

Gary Allan Herzberg (born December 5, 1967) is an American country music singer. Signed to Decca Records in 1996, he made his country music debut with the release of his single "Her Man", the lead-off to his gold-certified debut album Used Heart for Sale, which was released in 1996 on Decca. His second album, It Would Be You, followed in 1998. His third album, Smoke Rings in the Dark, was his first one for MCA Nashville (he has been signed to the label since then) and his first platinum album. His next albums, Alright Guy (2001) and See If I Care (2003), both were also certified platinum while Tough All Over (2005) and Greatest Hits (2007) and Living Hard (2007) were all certified gold.

Allan's next two albums Get Off on the Pain (2010) and Set You Free (2013) both reached the Top 10 on the U.S. Billboard Top Country Albums charts, at numbers 2 and 1 respectively. Overall, his ten studio and greatest hits albums have produced 26 singles on the U.S. Billboard Hot Country Songs and Country Airplay charts, including the number one hits "Man to Man", "Tough Little Boys" (both 2003), "Nothing On but the Radio" (2004), and "Every Storm (Runs Out of Rain)" (2013).

== Personal life ==
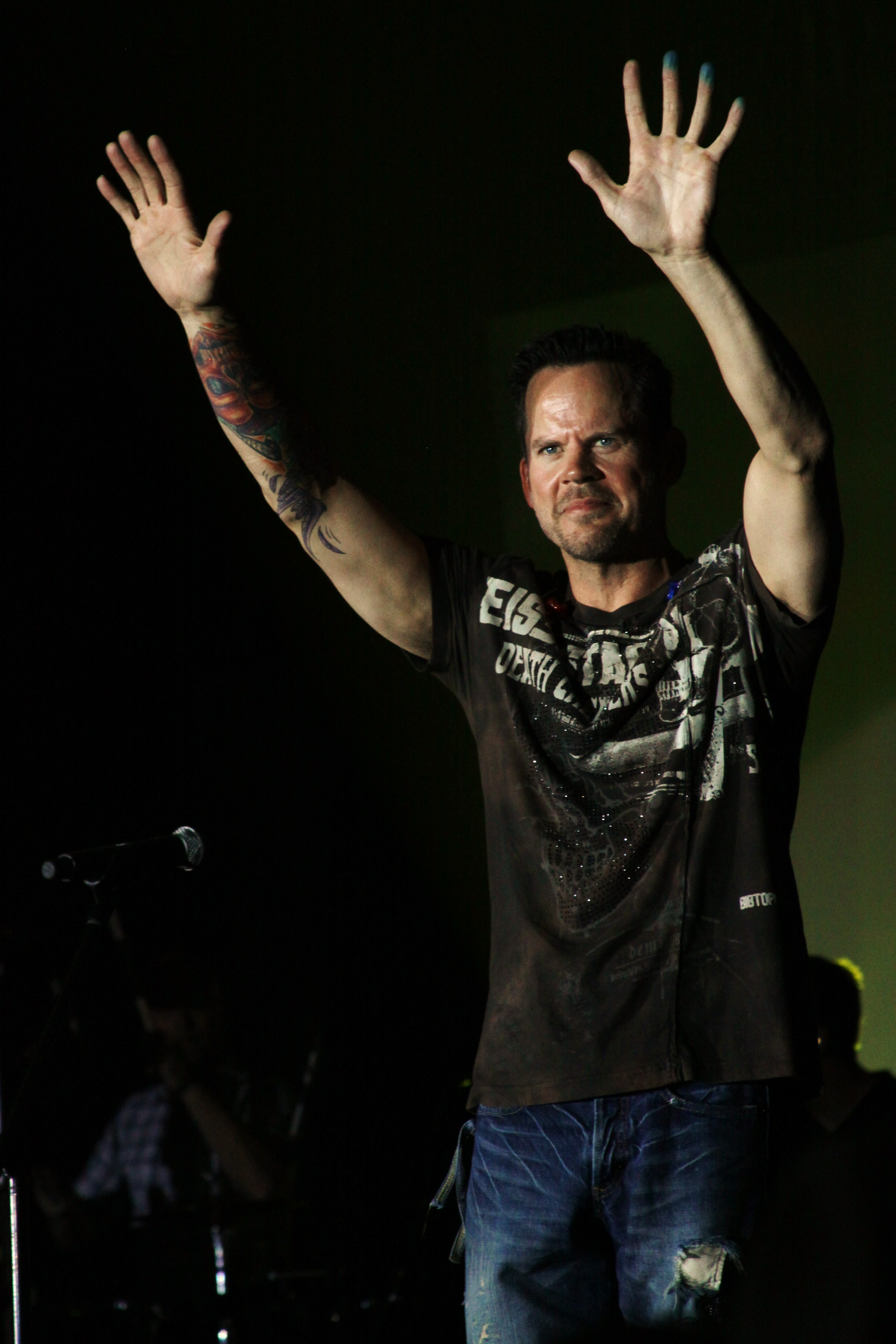
Allan leaving the stage in Mescalaro northeast of Las Cruces, New Mexico

Gary Allan Herzberg was born on December 5, 1967, in La Mirada, California, to Harley and Mary Herzberg. He grew up Mormon. Ensuring that the family would focus on music, Allan's mother insisted that the family's guitars always remain visible in the home. At age 13, Allan began playing in honky tonks with his father. Two years later, he was offered his first recording contract, from A&M Records, but rejected the deal. His parents wanted him to finish his education and his father felt that Allan had yet to develop his own distinctive style. Despite his commitment to finishing school, Allan reflects that he was rarely alert in class. "I played the bars at night, I was half asleep when I got to school. I thought sleep was what you did when you go to school."

After graduating from La Serna High School in Whittier, California, Allan continued to play in the bars with his band, the Honky Tonk Wranglers. Many of the venues they played were packed and promoters often tried to move them to larger clubs. Doing so would have required him to stop playing some of the older country music, such as covers of George Jones songs, so Allan refused. In 1987, Allan married his first wife, Tracy Taylor. They have since divorced. He married model Danette Day on November 28, 1998 in South Carolina and they divorced in June 1999. His third wife, Angela (whom he wed on June 5, 2001), died by suicide on October 25, 2004. In December 2021, Allan was engaged to Molly Martin. They married in a private ceremony in Tennessee on Feb. 5, attended by only an officiant and a photographer.

=== Nashville connection ===
Allan was introduced to songwriter/producer Byron Hill on August 28, 1993, by a mutual friend and talent-scout Jim Seal, at a bar called the Lion D'or in Downey, California, where Allan was already regularly performing. Seal and Hill had asked Allan if they could showcase an unsigned act that they were developing there. Hill had arranged to bring the head of A&R from a major label to the show to see this other act perform. Allan kindly let them use his stage for the event, giving the new act the opening performance slot that night. Hill promised Allan that they would make sure the A&R person remained there to see his portion of the show. Everyone was knocked out with Allan's performance, and very impressed with his voice. From that point on, Byron Hill began sending Allan songs. Without any serious funding at the time, Hill arranged for Allan to go into Seal's small studio in California to try his vocals on some of existing demo tracks which Hill had sent to Allan from Nashville. Meanwhile, Hill became head of A&R at BNA Entertainment on October 29 of that same year and immediately wanted to sign Allan to BNA, but the then current roster conditions and other circumstances related to the planned restructuring of RCA/BNA Nashville stood in the way.

=== From demo to deal ===
In the meantime, Allan took a job selling cars. He left a demo tape in the glove box of a truck purchased by a wealthy couple. When the couple discovered that he was the singer, they wrote him a check for $12,000. This independent funding allowed Allan to go to Nashville to record some of the songs that were on that early demo tape with Byron Hill as producer. On September 11, 1995, they worked at Javelina Studios for a couple of days on the four songs that Hill immediately showed to labels. Allan's recordings brought serious responses from several labels including Mercury, RCA, and Decca. A meeting was then held at a Nashville hotel among Hill, Allan, and friend of Allan's, who was a program director for a radio station in California.

The meeting was to arrange two showcases in Los Angeles to put Allan on stage at two of the radio station's regular nights at a local club. Hill arranged for staffers at the Nashville office of Decca Records to attend the first showcase held on November 1, 1995. Decca immediately wanted to sign Allan, and knowing that Hill was lining up other labels to see Allan, Decca asked them to cancel the second showcase. A rep from RCA was already booked to see the second showcase the following week, but the "bird-in-hand" deal offer was too tempting for both Allan and Hill, so they committed to the Decca offer. Decca staffer Mark Wright and Byron Hill co-produced Allan's first three albums for Decca beginning sessions on March 11, 1996, for Used Heart for Sale, then It Would Be You, both of which yielded top five singles, and later Smoke Rings in the Dark (which also included Tony Brown as a co-producer). It was during the recording of the first album that they recorded "It Must Have Been Ol' Santa Claus", as an added track to be packaged on various MCA/Decca Christmas compilations. Then Allan and Hill got a personal call from Harry Connick, Jr., the writer of the song, thanking them for the recording, during which he added a few of his New Orleans Jazz style "very cool man!" compliments. The Christmas recording has been since released on at least four compilations. The merger of PolyGram, Decca, and MCA Records marked the closing of Decca and Allan was moved to MCA Records.

== Career ==
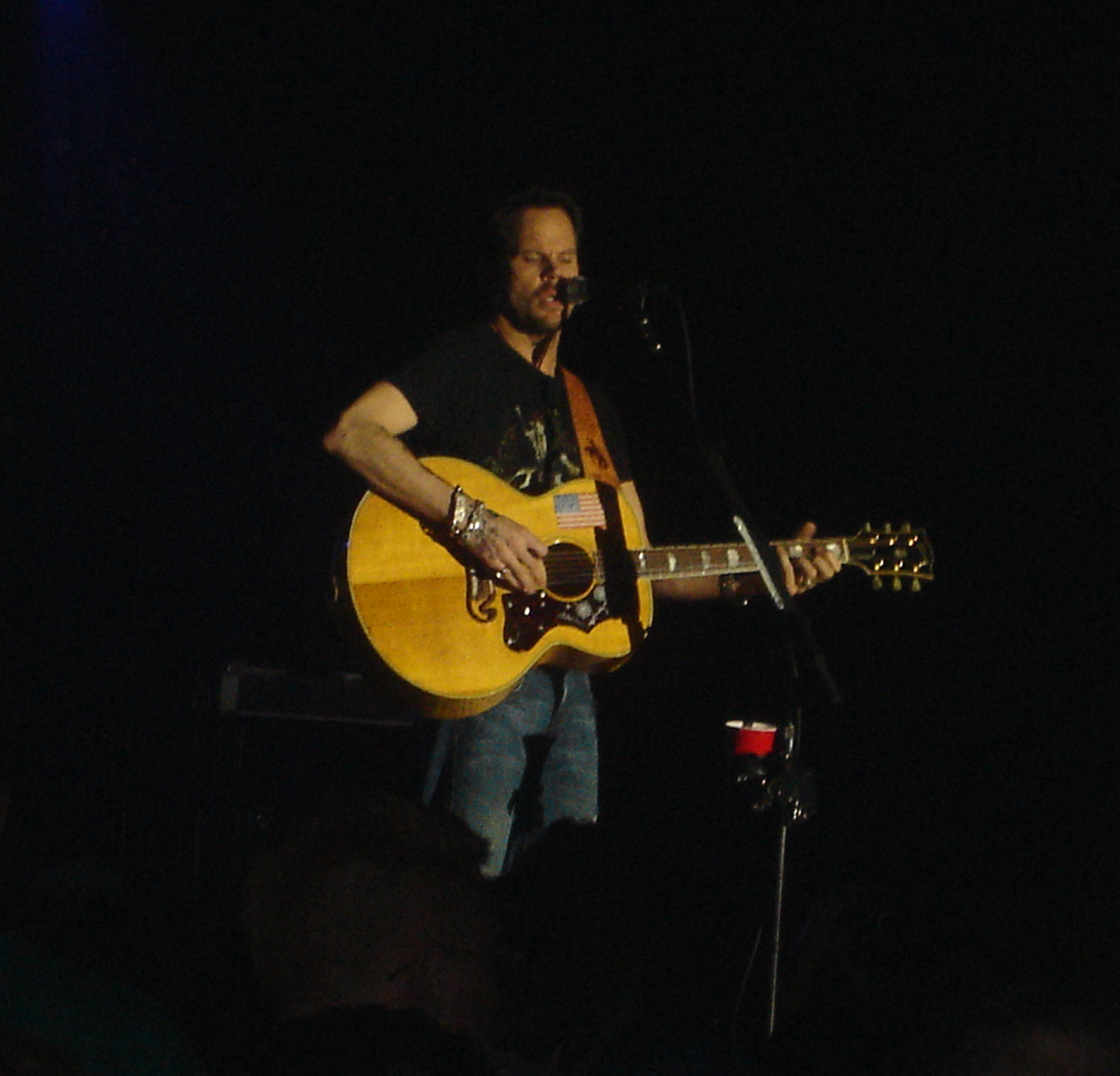
Allan performing in Paducah, Kentucky, April 2006

=== Used Heart for Sale ===
His first deal, with Decca Records Nashville, produced his debut studio album Used Heart for Sale in 1996. The album was named "Best of the Month" by Stereo Review. It advanced to the Top 20 of the charts. Its first single, "Her Man" (previously recorded by Waylon Jennings) gave Allan his first Top 10 country hit on the U.S. Billboard Hot Country Songs chart. Other tracks from this album, however, proved less successful.

=== It Would Be You ===
Allan's second studio album, It Would Be You, was released in 1998. Although he has been writing songs since his teen years, the singer has not really hesitated to bump his work from his albums in favor of those written by other songwriters that he respects. For the album, Allan replaced one of his songs with "No Judgement Day", written by Allen Shamblin. Even though that song was a hidden acoustic track, radio stations started giving it some heavy airplay. "No Judgement Day" tells the story of a restaurant owner from a small town in Texas, where ex co-workers killed him in search of money, for drugs and alcohol. The album's title track became Allan's second hit to reach the Top 10 on the U.S. country charts, remaining there after 21 weeks of radio play, "way beyond the tenure of most disposable radio hits." In early-1999, Decca Records folded, and when Allan moved to the parent label, MCA Nashville, the It Would Be You album was left in limbo.

Allan was named as "Country Music's Sexy Star" by People Magazine. He also delved into the acting world in the TV mini-series Shake, Rattle, & Roll, in which he would play the lead role of Eddie Cochran. He followed that role with a part in the CBS TV series Pensacola: Wings of Gold, but describes his acting experience as "tedious."

=== Smoke Rings in the Dark ===
In 1999, Allan released his third studio album Smoke Rings in the Dark which is an album he recorded while in the midst of divorcing from his second wife, Versace model Danette Day, after only seven months of marriage. Unlike his first two albums, Smoke Rings in the Dark made fuller use of background singers and stringed instruments, "resulting in a lusher, fuller sound." The new album avoided the "devil-may-care brashness" of the first two, instead presenting a tone balanced between youthful optimism and "the knowledge that some of life's experiences exact a high toll." Smoke Rings in the Dark was certified platinum, and it included two successful singles, including its title track.

=== Alright Guy ===
The singer's fourth studio album Alright Guy was released in 2001. It contained the singles "The One", "Man of Me", and "Man to Man", the latter of which became his first number one hit on the U.S. Billboard country charts. That same year, Allan married for the third time, to Angela, a flight attendant whom he met on an airplane.

=== See If I Care ===
Despite his previous success and eight years in the music business, Allan was nominated for the Country Music Association's Horizon Award, typically given to newcomers, in 2003. The same year, he released his fifth studio album See If I Care. Allan had to be controversial to keep the album's title. Also, he thought that title had epitomized his attitude towards the music business, and that he would continue to make the music that he wanted to make regardless of whether the record label chose to back him or people chose to buy the album. See If I Care included Allan's second and third number one singles with "Tough Little Boys", and "Nothing On but the Radio." "Songs About Rain" was a Top 15 hit.

=== Tough All Over ===
In 2003, Allan and his wife, Angela Herzberg, moved to Tennessee from California. On October 25, 2004, Angela committed suicide after suffering from depression and migraines. Allan initially put his career on hold, but soon returned to music to deal with the loss of his wife. This resulted in 2005's "heart-wrenchingly personal album," Tough All Over. He included several songs which he wrote or cowrote, including "Puttin' Memories Away" and "I Just Got Back from Hell," which dealt directly with his grief. Several years later, Gary discussed his wife's suicide on The Oprah Winfrey Show.

Tough All Over sold over 99,000 copies in its first week, debuting at No. 3 on the Billboard 200 chart and at No. 1 on Top Country Albums. It was subsequently certified gold by the RIAA as of December 20, 2006, and contained the Top 10 singles "Best I Ever Had" (written by Vertical Horizon's Matt Scannell) and "Life Ain't Always Beautiful," co-written by country singer Cyndi Thomson (under the name Cyndi Goodman).

=== Greatest Hits ===
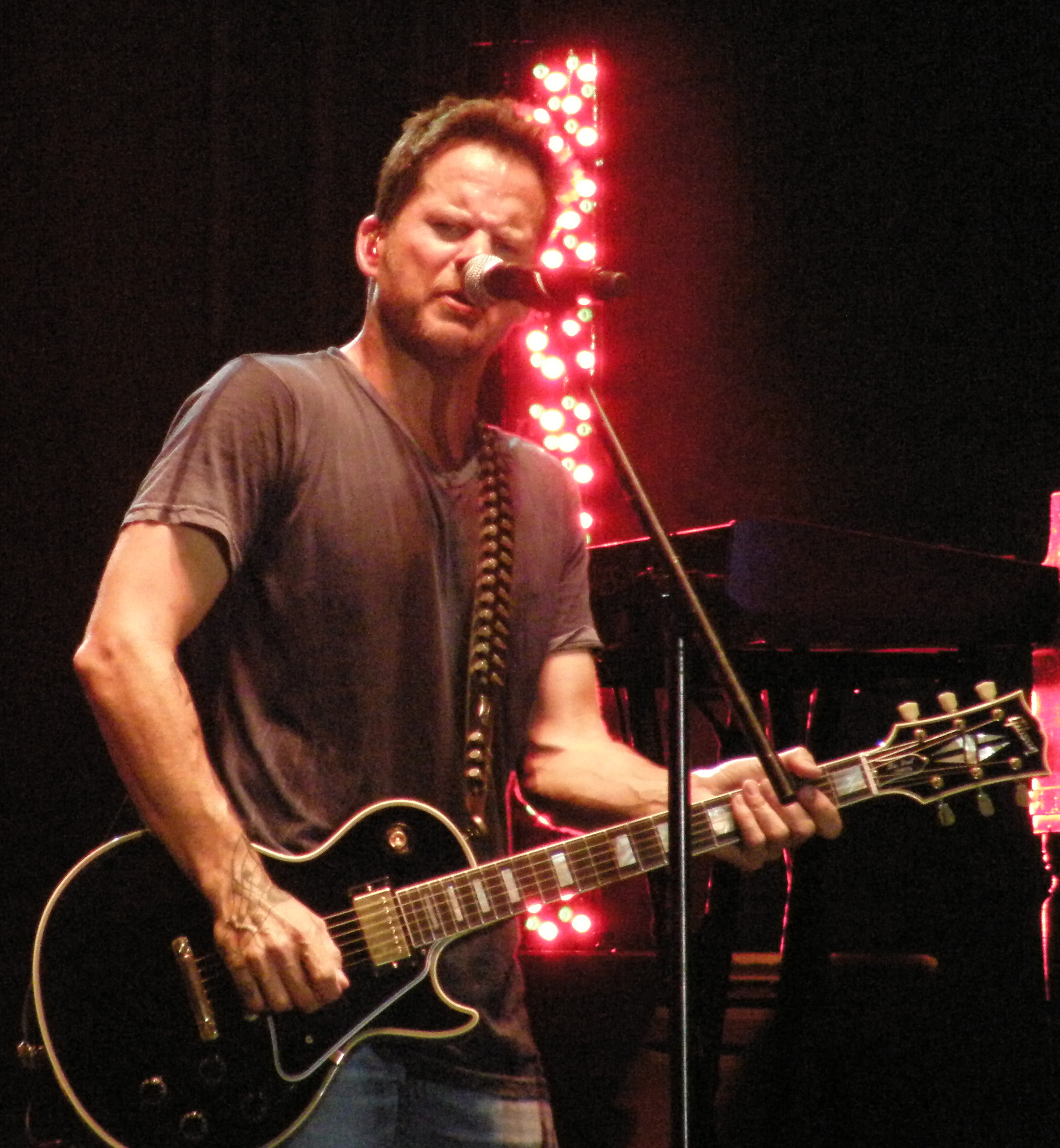
Allan performing at Harrah's Metropolis in Metropolis, Illinois southwest of Evansville, Indiana, July 2010

Allan's first Greatest Hits collection was released on March 6, 2007. A Number One album on the Billboard Top Country Albums charts, the album reprised the greatest hits from his first six albums, as well as two new songs. One of these, titled "A Feelin' Like That", was co-written by David Lee Murphy and Ira Dean (the latter a former member of Trick Pony); the single peaked at No. 12 on the country singles charts.

=== Living Hard ===
The album Living Hard was released on October 23, 2007. Serving as its lead-off single was the song "Watching Airplanes," which spent more than thirty weeks on the country charts, where it reached a peak of No. 2 and went No. 1 on the Mediabase Chart. The song's music video was filmed during live concerts, including one at the Red Rocks Amphitheatre in Morrison, Colorado. Second single "Learning How to Bend"–co-written by Allan–quickly became another hit song, peaking at No. 13. The video was filmed during a live performance at the House of Blues in Atlantic City, New Jersey. Following this song is third single "She's So California," which Allan co-wrote with Jaime Hanna (of Hanna-McEuen) and Jon Randall, and it peaked at No. 24, becoming his first single to miss the top 20 since "Lovin' You Against My Will" in 2000.

=== Get Off on the Pain ===
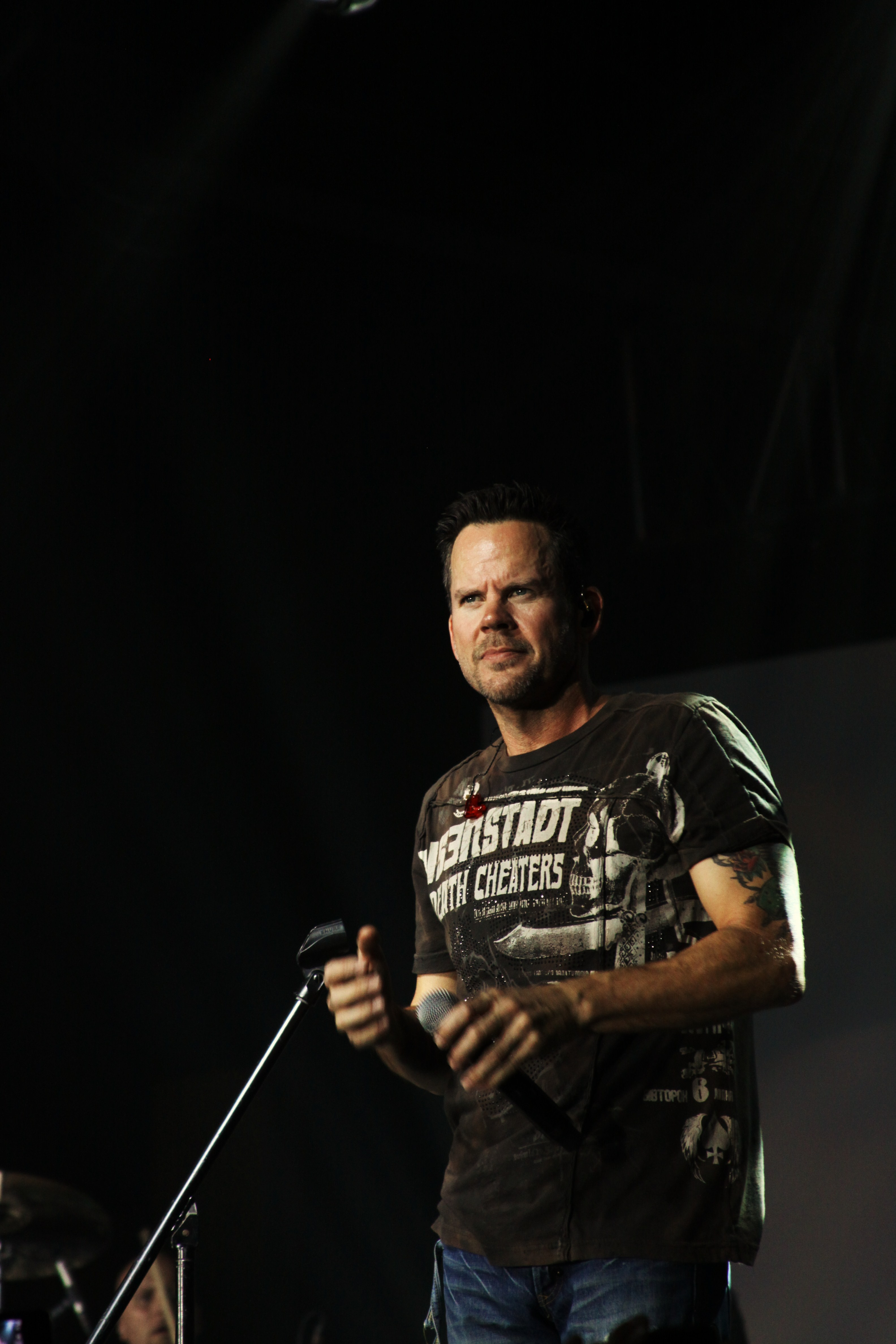
Allan speaking with fans in Mescalero, September 2010

A new single, entitled "Today", was released on June 12, 2009. It served as the lead-off single to the album Get Off on the Pain, which was released on March 9, 2010.

The title track was the album's second single. The song debuted at No. 42 on the U.S. Billboard Hot Country Songs chart, the highest-debuting single of his career.

"Kiss Me When I'm Down" was released as the album's third single. That song debuted at No. 52 on the U.S. Billboard Hot Country Songs chart.

=== Set You Free ===
Allan's ninth studio album, Set You Free, was released on January 22, 2013. Its first single, "Every Storm (Runs Out of Rain)", was released to country radio on September 17, 2012, and reached Number One on the Country Airplay chart on February 9, 2013, giving Allan his fourth Number One country hit and his first since "Nothing On but the Radio" in December 2004. In an interview with Broadway's Electric Barnyard, Allan spoke about co-writing with women for the new release. It was the first time in his career he had done so, and he described it as an interesting experience. The album's second single, "Pieces", was released to country radio on February 25, 2013. The third single, "It Ain't the Whiskey", was released on September 23, 2013.

=== Ruthless ===
In March 2015, Allan released a new single entitled "Hangover Tonight". This song was slated to serve as the lead single to his upcoming tenth studio album, entitled Hard Way. Two more singles, "Do You Wish It Was Me?" and "Mess Me Up", followed in 2016 and 2017. The commercial failure of these singles caused delays in the release of an album.

On July 31, 2020, Allan released another new single called "Waste of a Whiskey Drink" through EMI Nashville. His tenth album, Ruthless, was released on June 25, 2021.

== Political views ==
In 2003, Allan told CMT that he believed Republican candidate Arnold Schwarzenegger would be the best governor because he is not driven by money. In 2021, he told People that he was "very much not a Republican."

== Sound ==
Allan's voice is described as "raspy and unpolished." The New York Times describes his music as "elegant, often deadpan songs [that] tend toward manly understatement." His sound is influenced by the Bakersfield scene, especially Buck Owens and Merle Haggard. He prefers that sound to the more pop country which is prevalent on country radio, because "the songs have got to have soul, have real meaning... Country music is... what happens during the week. Rock 'n roll is about what happens at the weekend." Because his sound is different from many of the current crop of country singers, as their sound is considerably more pop or rock, Allan has, at times had difficulty getting radio to play his singles. He says he has to "walk a real fine line" to "make sure that I get traditional stuff on the radio."

== Discography ==
=== Studio albums ===
- Used Heart for Sale (1996)
- It Would Be You (1998)
- Smoke Rings in the Dark (1999)
- Alright Guy (2001)
- See If I Care (2003)
- Tough All Over (2005)
- Living Hard (2007)
- Get Off on the Pain (2010)
- Set You Free (2013)
- Ruthless (2021)

=== Compilation albums ===
- Greatest Hits (2007)
- Icon (2012)

=== Number one singles ===
- "Man to Man" (2003)
- "Tough Little Boys" (2003)
- "Nothing On but the Radio" (2004)
- "Every Storm (Runs Out of Rain)" (2013)
