= Greg Droman =

American audio engineer

- Origin: American
- Occupation: Record producer

Greg Droman is an American record producer, mixing and audio engineer. He has made hit singles and albums for some of the biggest artists in pop, rock, and country music.

He has been Grammy and ACM nominated, winning an CMA as producer for Album of the Year.

He has been married since 1976 to singer and songwriter Marilyn Martin, producing and mixing her 2012 album, Trust, Love, Pray. The pair lived in Nashville in the 1990s and 2000s, but later moved to Los Angeles and as of 2023 live in Healdsburg, California.

== Artists that Droman has mixed, produced or engineered ==
- Marilyn Martin (Trust, Love, Pray, 2012)
- Fleetwood Mac
- Lindsey Buckingham
- Kate Voegele
- Faith Hill
- Gary Allan
- Jen Foster
- Trisha Yearwood
- Los Lonely Boys
- Lee Ann Womack
- Jace Everett
- Jude Cole
- Emmylou Harris
- Delbert McClinton
- Brooks & Dunn
- Jennifer Hanson
- Ashley Monroe
- Keith Gattis
- Randy Houser
- Jessi Alexander
- Danielle Brisebois
- Josh Turner
- Joe Nichols
- Gretchen Wilson
- Chris Knight
- Bruce Robison
- Joe Walsh
- Joe Vitale
