= Mark Wright (music producer) =

American songwriter and record producer (born 1957)

- Born: September 21, 1957 (age 68); Fayetteville, Arkansas, U.S.
- Origin: Nashville, Tennessee, U.S.
- Genres: Country
- Occupations: Songwriter, record producer
- Years active: 1980s–present

Mark Wright (born September 21, 1957) is an American record producer who works mainly in country music. He is known for having worked with Brooks & Dunn, Gary Allan, and Lee Ann Womack.

== Career ==
Wright was originally a songwriter, having written for Reba McEntire, Amy Grant, and Kenny Rogers. By 1989, he had moved to RCA Records, where he worked in A&R and co-produced Clint Black's debut album Killin' Time. He also produced Too Cold at Home for Mark Chesnutt, and became senior vice president of MCA Nashville's sister label Decca Records in 1994 until its closure in 1999. In 2001, Wright received a Grammy Award nomination for co-producing Womack's I Hope You Dance.

He was later executive vice president of A&R for MCA Nashville, then served in the same position at Sony Music Nashville from June 2003 to December 2006. Wright became president of Universal South Records in 2006, and held the position until the label merged with Toby Keith's Show Dog Records to become Show Dog-Universal Music in 2009, at which point he became president of the new label.
