= Jake Owen discography =

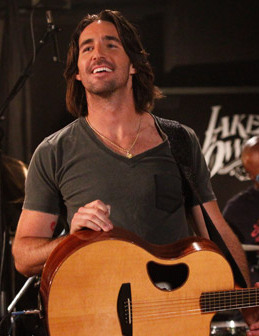
- Jake Owen at Walmart Soundcheck
- Studio albums: 7
- EPs: 2
- Compilation albums: 1
- Singles: 21
- Music videos: 20
- #1 Singles (Billboard): 9
- #1 Singles (overall): 10

American country music singer and songwriter Jake Owen has released seven studio albums, two extended plays, one compilation album, and 21 singles. Signed to RCA Nashville in 2006, he made his chart debut that same year with "Yee Haw". Of Owen's 21 singles, nine have reached number one on the US country charts: "Barefoot Blue Jean Night", "Alone with You", "The One That Got Away", and "Anywhere with You", all from his third studio album, Barefoot Blue Jean Night; "Beachin'" from his fourth studio album, Days of Gold; "American Country Love Song" from his fifth studio album, American Love, and "I Was Jack (You Were Diane)" and "Homemade" from his sixth studio album, Greetings from... Jake.

== Studio albums ==
Title	Album details	Peak chart positions				Sales	Certifications (sales threshold)
Title	Album details	US Country	US	AUS	CAN	Sales	Certifications (sales threshold)
Startin' with Me	Release date: July 25, 2006; Label: RCA Nashville; Formats: CD, digital download	8	31	—	—		
Easy Does It	Release date: February 24, 2009; Label: RCA Nashville; Formats: CD, digital download	2	13	—	—		
Barefoot Blue Jean Night	Release date: August 30, 2011; Label: RCA Nashville; Formats: CD, digital download	1	6	—	—	US: 435,000	RIAA: Platinum
Days of Gold	Release date: December 3, 2013; Label: RCA Nashville; Formats: CD, digital download	4	15	—	24	US: 215,400	
American Love	Release date: July 29, 2016; Label: RCA Nashville; Formats: CD, vinyl, digital download	1	4	55	14	US: 53,800	
Greetings from... Jake	Release date: March 29, 2019; Label: Big Loud; Formats: vinyl, digital download, streaming	8	65	— (Note: Greetings from... Jake did not enter the ARIA Albums Chart, but peaked at number 27 on the ARIA Digital Album Chart.)	70	US: 7,700; CAN: 40,000	MC: Gold; RIAA: Gold
Loose Cannon	Release date: June 23, 2023; Label: Big Loud; Formats: CD, digital download, streaming	—	—	—	—		
Dreams to Dream	Release date: November 7, 2025; Label: Good Company; Formats: Digital download, streaming	—	—	—	—		
"—" denotes releases that did not chart

== Compilation albums ==
Title	Album details	Peak chart positions	Sales
Title	Album details	US Country	Sales
Greatest Hits	Release date: November 24, 2017; Label: RCA Nashville; Formats: CD, digital download	46	US: 8,200

== Extended plays ==
Title	Album details	Peak chart positions	
Title	Album details	US Country	US
Endless Summer	Release date: September 25, 2012; Label: RCA Nashville; Formats: CD, digital download	2	19
Jake Owen	Release date: February 28, 2018; Label: Big Loud; Formats: Digital download	—	—

== Singles ==
Year	Single	Peak chart positions					Certifications (sales threshold)	Album
Year	Single	US Country Songs	US Country Airplay	US	CAN Country	CAN	Certifications (sales threshold)	Album
2006	"Yee Haw"	16		83	—	—		Startin' with Me
2006	"Startin' with Me"	6		83	28	—		Startin' with Me
2007	"Something About a Woman"	15		— (Note: "Something About a Woman" did not enter the Hot 100, but charted at number 4 on the Bubbling Under Hot 100 chart, which acts as a 25-song extension of the Hot 100.)	48	—		Startin' with Me
2008	"Don't Think I Can't Love You"	2		57	40	—		Easy Does It
2009	"Eight Second Ride"	11		70	37	—	RIAA: Gold	Easy Does It
2010	"Tell Me"	35		—	—	—		Easy Does It
2011	"Barefoot Blue Jean Night"	1		21	4	52	RIAA: 2× Platinum; RMNZ: Gold	Barefoot Blue Jean Night
2011	"Alone with You"	1		41	2	69	RIAA: Platinum	Barefoot Blue Jean Night
2012	"The One That Got Away"	7	1	51	1	65	RIAA: Gold	Barefoot Blue Jean Night
2013	"Anywhere with You"	7	1	46	4	60	RIAA: Platinum	Barefoot Blue Jean Night
2013	"Days of Gold"	19	15	83	28	—		Days of Gold
2014	"Beachin'"	1	1	26	1	39	RIAA: Platinum	Days of Gold
2014	"What We Ain't Got"	19	14	89	30	90		Days of Gold
2015	"Real Life"	17	17	74	23	89		—N/a
2016	"American Country Love Song"	6	1	55	2	88	RIAA: Gold; MC: Platinum	American Love
2016	"If He Ain't Gonna Love You"	45	37	—	—	—		American Love
2017	"Good Company"	39	32	—	—	—		American Love
2018	"I Was Jack (You Were Diane)"	7	1	43	1	78	RIAA: Platinum; MC: Platinum	Greetings from... Jake
2018	"Down to the Honkytonk"	9	7	65	1	58	RIAA: 2× Platinum; MC: 2× Platinum	Greetings from... Jake
2019	"Homemade"	5	1	39	1	100	RIAA: Platinum; MC: Gold	Greetings from... Jake
2020	"Made for You"	3	1	32	1	51	RIAA: Platinum; MC: Gold	Greetings from... Jake
2021	"Best Thing Since Backroads"	17	2	72	3	78		—N/a
2022	"Up There Down Here"	—	48	—	—	—		—N/a
2023	"On the Boat Again"	—	36	—	—	—		Loose Cannon
"—" denotes releases that did not chart

== Other singles ==
=== Featured singles ===
Year	Single	Artist	Peak chart positions				Certifications (sales threshold)	Album
Year	Single	Artist	US Hot Country	US Country Airplay	CAN Country	CAN	Certifications (sales threshold)	Album
2012	"Back"	Colt Ford	40	50	—	—		Declaration of Independence
2022	"11 Beers"	The Reklaws	—	—	1	56	MC: Platinum	Good Ol' Days

=== Other charted songs ===
Year	Single	Peak chart positions					Album
Year	Single	US Hot Country	US Country Airplay	US	CAN Country	CAN	Album
2008	"Life in a Northern Town" (with Sugarland and Little Big Town)	28		43	30	53	Love on the Inside (Sugarland album)
2011	"Mele Kalikimaka"	40		—	—	—	A Very Country Christmas
2012	"Summer Jam" (with Florida Georgia Line)	35	50	— (Note: "Summer Jam" did not enter the Hot 100, but charted at number 7 on Bubbling Under Hot 100 Singles, which acts as a 25-song extension of the Hot 100.)	—	51	Endless Summer
2013	"Ghost Town"	47	—	—	—	91	Days of Gold
"—" denotes releases that did not chart

== Other appearances ==
List of non-single guest appearances, with other performing artists, showing year released and album name
Title	Year	Other artist(s)	Album
"Back Home"	2015	Owl City	Mobile Orchestra

== Music videos ==
Year	Video	Director
2006	"Yee Haw"	Wes Edwards
2007	"Startin' with Me"	Shaun Silva
2008	"Life in a Northern Town" (with Sugarland and Little Big Town)	Becky Fluke
2008	"Don't Think I Can't Love You"	David McClister
2009	"Eight Second Ride"	Deaton-Flanigen Productions
2010	"Tell Me"	Mason Dixon
2011	"Barefoot Blue Jean Night"	Mason Dixon
2011	"Alone with You"	Mason Dixon
2012	"The One That Got Away"	Mason Dixon
2013	"Days of Gold"	Mason Dixon
2013	"Beachin'"	Mason Dixon
2013	"Ghost Town"	Mason Dixon
2014	"What We Ain't Got"	Mason Dixon
2015	"Real Life"	Jeff Venable
2016	"American Country Love Song"	Jeff Venable
2017	"Good Company"	Colin Cooper/Austin Bever
2018	"I Was Jack (You Were Diane)"	Justin Clough
2018	"Down to the Honkytonk"	Justin Cloud/Ben Skipworth
2019	"Homemade"	Justin Clough
2020	"Made for You"	Matt Paskert
