= Greatest Hits (Jake Owen album) =

Greatest hits album by Jake Owen
- Released: November 24, 2017
- Genre: Country
- Length: 41:55
- Label: RCA Nashville
- Producers: Jimmy Ritchey; Rodney Clawson; Joey Moi; Ross Copperman; Shane McAnally; Jake Owen; Tommy Cecil

Jake Owen chronology
American Love (2016)	Greatest Hits (2017)	Greetings from... Jake (2019)

Greatest Hits is the first compilation album by American country music artist Jake Owen. It was released on November 24, 2017, via RCA Nashville. The album includes eleven previously released singles and two unreleased songs.

== Track listing ==
Greatest Hits track listing
No.	Title	Writer(s)	Length
1.	"Yee Haw"	Jake Owen, Casey Beathard, Kendell Marvel	2:52
2.	"Don't Think I Can't Love You"	Owen, Jimmy Ritchey, Marvel	3:04
3.	"Eight Second Ride"	Owen, Eric Durrance	3:07
4.	"Barefoot Blue Jean Night"	Eric Paslay, Dylan Altman, Terry Sawchuk	2:47
5.	"Alone with You"	Shane McAnally, J. T. Harding, Catt Gravitt	3:30
6.	"The One That Got Away"	Owen, Dallas Davidson, Ritchey	3:12
7.	"Anywhere with You"	David Lee Murphy, Jimmy Yeary, Ben Hayslip	3:28
8.	"Days of Gold"	Jaren Johnston, Neil Mason	3:20
9.	"Beachin'"	Johnston, Jimmy Robbins, Jon Nite	3:10
10.	"What We Ain't Got"	Travis Meadows, Travis Jeromoe Gott	3:38
11.	"American Country Love Song"	Johnston, Ross Copperman, Ashley Gorley	3:17
12.	"Subliminal Love"	Owen, Benjy Davis, Cole Taylor, Tommy Cecil	3:19
13.	"Love as You're in It"	Owen, Jared Mullins, Kelsey Hart, Matt Alderman, Cecil	3:11
Total length:			41:45

== Charts ==
Chart performance for Greatest Hits
Chart (2017)	Peak position
US Top Country Albums (Billboard)	46
