= Days of Gold Tour =

2014 concert tour by Jake Owen

- Tour by Jake Owen
- Associated album: Days of Gold
- Start date: March 20, 2014
- End date: October 25, 2014
- Legs: 1
- No. of shows: 69
- Box office: $544,723

Jake Owen concert chronology
- The Summer Never Ends Tour (2012); Days of Gold Tour (2014)

The Days of Gold Tour presented by Discover Boating is the second headlining tour by American country music singer Jake Owen. The tour began on March 20, 2014, in Brookings, South Dakota, and ended on October 25, 2014, in Owen's hometown of Vero Beach, Florida.

== Background ==
The Days of Gold Tour is in support of Owen's fourth studio album, Days of Gold. Opening acts for the tour will be the Eli Young Band, Parmalee, Thomas Rhett, Frankie Ballard and The Cadillac Three. Owen went on tour with his wife, Lacey, and daughter.

== Opening acts ==
- Frankie Ballard (select dates)
- The Cadillac Three (select dates)
- Parmalee (select dates)
- Thomas Rhett (select dates)
- Eli Young Band (select dates)

== Setlist ==
1. "Days of Gold"
2. "Anywhere with You"
3. "Beachin'"
4. "Heaven"
5. "Eight Second Ride"
6. "Drivin' All Night"
7. "The One That Got Away"
8. Medley; "Friends in Low Places"/"Chattahoochee"/"Ice Ice Baby" (Garth Brooks/Alan Jackson/Vanilla Ice covers)
9. "Alone with You"
10. "Tipsy"
11. "Don't Think I Could Beg"
12. "Yee Ha"
13. "Barefoot Blue Jean Night"

== Tour dates ==
Date	City	Country	Venue	Opening acts
March 20, 2014	Brookings	United States	Swiftel Arena	Thomas Rhett; The Cadillac Three
March 21, 2014	Fargo	United States	Scheels Arena	Thomas Rhett; The Cadillac Three
March 22, 2014	Bemidji	United States	Sanford Center	Thomas Rhett; The Cadillac Three
April 10, 2014	Casper	United States	Casper Events Center	Parmalee; The Cadillac Three
April 11, 2014	Rapid City	United States	Rushmore Plaza Civic Center	Parmalee; The Cadillac Three
April 12, 2014	Bismarck	United States	Bismarck Civic Center	Parmalee; The Cadillac Three
April 24, 2014	Bowling Green	United States	Diddle Arena	Parmalee; The Cadillac Three
April 25, 2015	Fairborn	United States	Nutter Center	Parmalee; The Cadillac Three
May 1, 2014	Fort Wayne	United States	Allen County War Memorial Coliseum	Parmalee; The Cadillac Three
May 2, 2014	Indiana	United States	Kovalchick Convention and Athletic Complex	Parmalee; The Cadillac Three
May 3, 2014	Wilkes-Barre	United States	Mohegan Sun Arena at Casey Plaza	Parmalee; The Cadillac Three
May 15, 2014	Huntington	United States	Big Sandy Superstore Arena	Eli Young Band; The Cadillac Three
May 16, 2014	Greensboro	United States	White Oak Amphitheatre	Eli Young Band; The Cadillac Three
May 29, 2014	Gilford	United States	Bank of New Hampshire Pavilion	Eli Young Band; The Cadillac Three
May 30, 2014	New York City	United States	Hammerstein Ballroom	The Cadillac Three
May 31, 2014 ^{[A]}	Virginia Beach	United States	Patriot Festival	—
June 12, 2014 ^{[B]}	North Lawrence	United States	The Country Fest	—
June 13, 2014 ^{[C]}	Buffalo	United States	Taste of Country Festival	—
June 14, 2014	Orilla	Canada	Casino Rama Events Center	—
June 15, 2014	Windsor	Canada	The Colosseum at Caesars	The Cadillac Three
June 19, 2014 ^{[D]}	Grand Junction	United States	Country Jam USA	—
June 21, 2014 ^{[E]}	Pueblo	United States	Bands in the Backyard	—
June 27, 2014 ^{[F]}	Greeley	United States	Greeley Stampede	—
June 28, 2014	Norfolk	United States	Divots Events Center	—
June 29, 2014	Park City	United States	Hartman Arena	Parmalee; The Cadillac Three
July 10, 2014	Reading	United States	Santander Arena	—
July 11, 2014	Uncasville	United States	Mohegan Sun Arena	Frankie Ballard
July 12, 2014 ^{[G]}	Shagticoke	United States	WGNA Country Fest	—
July 17, 2014 ^{[D]}	Eau Claire	United States	Country Jam USA	—
July 18, 2014 ^{[H]}	Valparaiso	United States	Porter County Fair	—
July 19, 2014	Beckley	United States	YMCA Paul Cline Memorial Sports Complex	—
July 24, 2014	Ashwaubenon	United States	Resch Center	Parmalee; The Cadillac Three
July 25, 2014	Moline	United States	iWireless Center	Parmalee; The Cadillac Three
July 26, 2014^{[I]}	St. Cloud	United States	Firefest	—
July 30, 2014 ^{[J]}	Great Falls	United States	Montana State Fair	—
August 1, 2014 ^{[K]}	Duncan	Canada	Sunfest Country	—
August 2, 2014 ^{[L]}	Sweet Home	United States	Oregon Jamboree	—
August 3, 2014	George	United States	The Gorge	—
August 7, 2014	Ventura	United States	Ventura County Fair	—
August 8, 2014	Los Angeles	United States	Greek Theatre	—
August 9, 2014	Las Vegas	United States	Mandalay Beach	—
August 14, 2014 ^{[M]}	Des Moines	United States	Iowa State Fair	Eli Young Band; The Cadillac Three
August 15, 2014 ^{[N]}	Sedalia	United States	Missouri State Fair	Eli Young Band; The Cadillac Three
August 16, 2014 ^{[O]}	Springfield	United States	Illinois State Fair	Parmalee; The Cadillac Three
August 21, 2014	Tuscaloosa	United States	Tuscaloosa Amphitheater	Parmalee; The Cadillac Three
August 22, 2014	Orange Beach	United States	Amphitheater at the Wharf	Parmalee; The Cadillac Three
August 23, 2014	New Orleans	United States	Bold Sphere Music & Champion Square	Parmalee; The Cadillac Three
September 4, 2014	Gainesville	United States	O'Connell Center	Eli Young Band; The Cadillac Three
September 5, 2014	North Charleston	United States	North Charleston PAC	Parmalee; The Cadillac Three
September 6, 2014	Augusta	United States	James Brown Arena	Eli Young Band; The Cadillac Three
September 11, 2014	Fayetteville	United States	Arkansas Music Pavilion	—
September 12, 2014	Robinsville	United States	Horseshoe Casino Tunica	The Cadillac Three
September 18, 2014	Cape Girardeau	United States	Show Me Center	Eli Young Band; The Cadillac Three
September 19, 2014 ^{[P]}	Kansas City	United States	Starlight Theatre	—
September 20, 2014	Rockford	United States	BMO Harris Bank Center	The Cadillac Three
September 25, 2014	Tupelo	United States	BancorpSouth Arena	Eli Young Band; The Cadillac Three
September 26, 2014	Huntsville	United States	Von Braun Center	Eli Young Band; The Cadillac Three
September 27, 2014	Cherokee	United States	Harrah's Cherokee	The Cadillac Three
October 3, 2014^{[Q]}	Columbus	United States	Lifestyle Communities Pavilion	The Cadillac Three
October 4, 2014 ^{[R]}	Columbia	United States	Merriweather Post Pavilion	Eli Young Band, Thompson Square; Love and Theft; The Cadillac Three
October 5, 2014 ^{[R]}	Columbia	United States	Merriweather Post Pavilion	Eli Young Band; The Cadillac Three
October 9, 2015	Terre Haute	United States	Hulman Center	Eli Young Band; The Cadillac Three
October 11, 2014	Toledo	United States	Huntington Center	Eli Young Band; The Cadillac Three
October 16, 2014	Milwaukee	United States	The Rave	The Cadillac Three
October 17, 2014	Mankato	United States	Verizon Wireless Center	Eli Young Band; The Cadillac Three
October 18, 2014	Lincoln	United States	Pinnacle Bank Arena	Eli Young Band; The Cadillac Three
October 23, 2014	Duluth	United States	Arena at Gwinnett Center	Eli Young Band; The Cadillac Three
October 24, 2014	Tallahassee	United States	Donald L. Tucker Center	—
October 25, 2014	Vero Beach	United States	Holman Stadium	The Cadillac Three

Festivals and fairs

- ^{A} This concert was a part of the Virginia Beach Patriot Festival.
- ^{B} This concert was a part of The Country Festival.
- ^{C} This concert was a part of the Taste of Country Festival.
- ^{D} These concerts were part of Country Jam USA.
- ^{E} This concert was a part of Bands in the Backyard.
- ^{F} This concert was a part of the Greeley Stampede.
- ^{G} This concert was a part of the WGNA Country Fest.
- ^{H} This concert was a part of the Porter County Fair.
- ^{I} This concert was a part of Firefest
- ^{J} This concert was a part of the Montana State Fair.
- ^{K} This concert was a part of Sunfest Country.
- ^{L} This concert was a part of the Oregon Jamboree.
- ^{M} This concert was a part of the Iowa State Fair.
- ^{N} This concert was a part of the Missouri State Fair.
- ^{O} This concert was a part of the Illinois State Fair.
- ^{P} This concert was a part of the KBEQ Yallapalloza at Starlight Theatre.
- ^{Q} This concert was a part of WCOL Country in the Capitol.
- ^{R} These concerts were part of WPOC's "Saturday in the Country" and "Sunday in the Country".

== Box office score data ==
Venue	City	Tickets sold / available	Gross revenue
Meadowbrook	Gilford	5,599 / 7,264 (77%)	$232,458
Santander Arena	Reading	4,213 / 4,213 (100%)	$101,457
Mohegan Sun Arena	Uncasville	5,563 / 7,172 (78%)	$210,808
TOTAL		15,375 / 18,649 (77%)	$544,723
