= Real Life (Jake Owen song) =

Single by Jake Owen
- Released: May 26, 2015
- Recorded: 2015
- Genre: Pop-punk; country pop
- Length: 2:47
- Label: RCA Nashville
- Songwriter(s): Shane McAnally; Josh Osborne; Ashley Gorley; Ross Copperman
- Producer(s): Shane McAnally; Ross Copperman

Jake Owen singles chronology
"What We Ain't Got" (2014)	"Real Life" (2015)	"American Country Love Song" (2016)

"Real Life" is a song written by Shane McAnally, Josh Osborne, Ashley Gorley, and Ross Copperman, and recorded by American country music artist Jake Owen. It was originally released as the lead single to his upcoming fifth studio album American Love, but was scrapped in a restructuring of the album after it stalled at number 17 on Country Airplay for several weeks.

== Content ==
Owen told Billboard and Rolling Stone that the idea for the song came when he discussed his favorite artists with songwriter-producers Shane McAnally and Ross Copperman, mentioning Sublime and Sugar Ray in particular. He also said that he wanted to record a song that differed from his usual beach-related themes, such as "Beachin'" or "The One That Got Away", and that he wanted McAnally and Copperman to give him a song about "real-life situations".

McAnally and Copperman, who produced the song, wrote it with Ashley Gorley and Josh Osborne. It features "relentless acoustic rhythm" and "strange gang vocals and a series of odd-but-familiar images from small-town America: prom queens in plastic crowns, amateurish bar bands and rude Waffle House waitresses." According to Owen, the song is thematically about how "In a world of materialistic things, everybody is constantly looking for what they don't have, as opposed to looking for what's real and what you have right in front of you. That's what 'What We Ain't Got' touched on…'Real Life' is about what we've got and what's real to us."

== Critical reception ==
Billy Dukes of Taste of Country gave the song a positive review, saying that "Sonically, the arrangement complements the languid, kind of adolescent nature of his lyric and delivery. Owen’s brand of nostalgia isn’t poignant. He’s more recalling the rebellious nature of youth in a way that’s more specific to suburbian(sic) kids that country kids. That’s not to say his songwriting team is lazy with the lyrics — they make clever references throughout “Real Life” and rely on specific, yet somehow universal stories."

== Commercial performance ==
The song debuted on the Hot Country Songs at number 27 and Country Airplay at number 29 on its released. It also debuted on the Country Digital Songs chart at number 6, selling 29,000 copies in the week. It peaked at number 17 on both Hot Country Songs and Country Airplay for charts of August 15, 2015. The song had sold 274,000 copies in the US as of October 2015.

== Music video ==
The music video was directed by Jeff Venable and premiered in June 2015. NASCAR driver Kevin Harvick appears in the video.

== Charts ==
Chart (2015)	Peak position
Canada (Canadian Hot 100)	89
Canada Country (Billboard)	23
US Billboard Hot 100	74
US Country Airplay (Billboard)	17
US Hot Country Songs (Billboard)	17

=== Year-end charts ===
Chart (2015)	Position
US Country Airplay (Billboard)	71
US Hot Country Songs (Billboard)	57
