= Donald L. Tucker Civic Center =

Arena in Florida, United States

- The Tuck
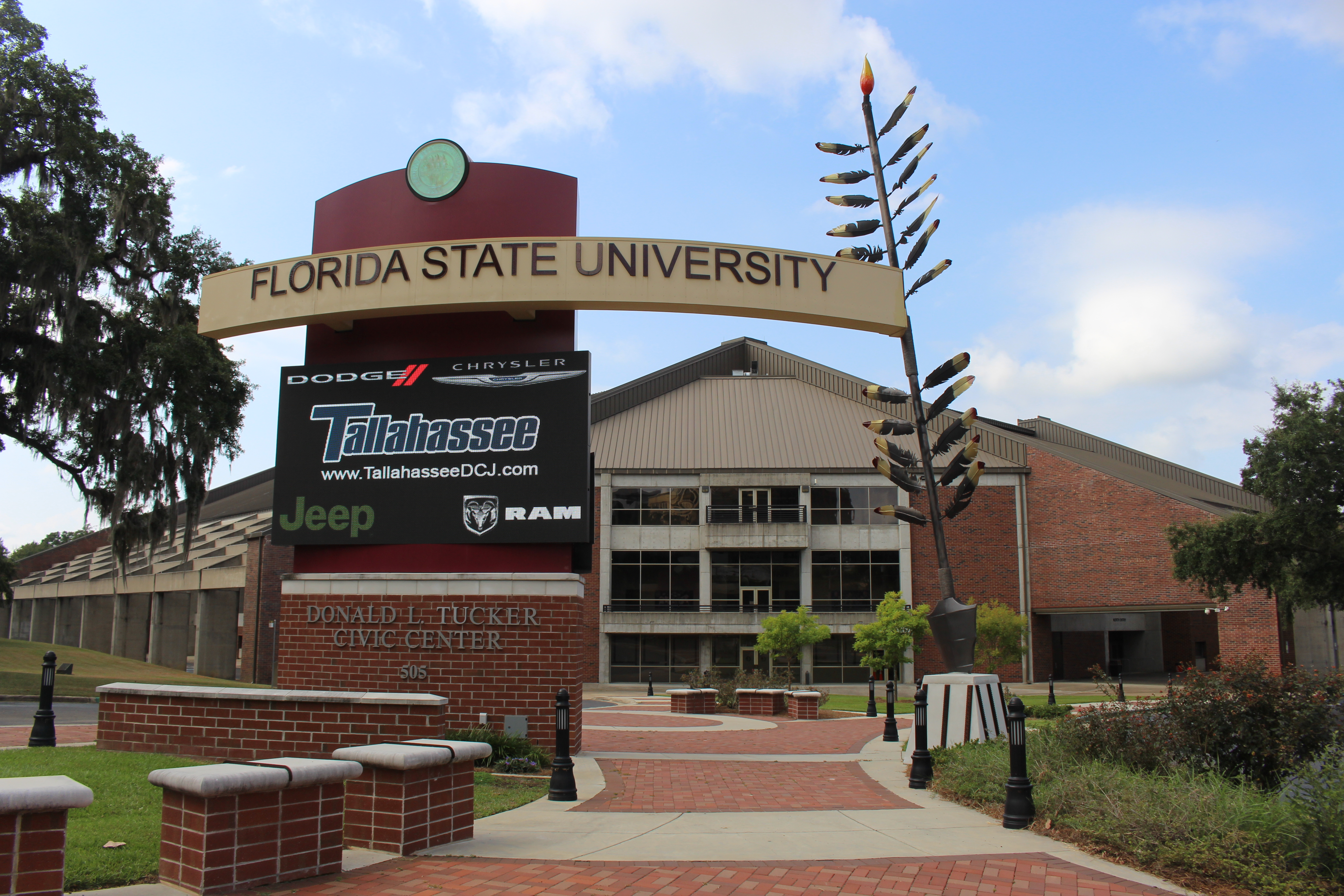
- Exterior view of venue (2019)
- Interactive map of Donald L. Tucker Civic Center
- Full name: Donald L. Tucker Civic Center at Florida State University
- Former names: Tallahassee-Leon County Civic Center (1981–2011)
- Address: 505 West Pensacola Street; Tallahassee, Florida, United States 32301-1619
- Location: Capitol Hill
- Coordinates: 30.437842°N 84.286690°W
- Owner: FSU Board of Trustees
- Operator: Spectra by Comcast Spectacor
- Capacity: 10,000 (1981–1988); 11,675 (1988–present); Concerts: 6,000–13,500; Hockey: 9,450
- Executive suites: 32
- Record attendance: 12,358 (Florida State vs Duke)

Construction
- Groundbreaking: 1978
- Opened: September 14, 1981
- Renovated: 1998–99, 2014–16
- Cost: $33.8 million ($167 million in 2025 dollars)
- Architects: Barrett, Daffin and Carlan, Inc.

Tenants
- Florida State Seminoles (Men) (Women) (NCAA) (1981–present); Tallahassee Tiger Sharks (ECHL) (1994–2001); Tallahassee Scorpions (EISL) (1997–98); Tallahassee Thunder (af2) (2000–02); Tallahassee Titans (AIFA) (2007)

Website
- tuckerciviccenter.com

The Donald L. Tucker Civic Center is a multi-purpose indoor arena located on the Florida State University campus in Tallahassee, Florida, United States. The arena has the biggest capacity of any arena in the Florida Panhandle. The arena opened in 1981 and was built at a cost of over $30 million, financed by the city. In 2013, the venue was purchased by the Florida State University Board of Trustees. The facility is located on the northeastern side of the university's campus, between the FSU College of Law and the future home of the FSU College of Business.

The arena is also located on the "Madison Mile", an economic development that connects the venue and Doak Campbell Stadium.

== About the arena ==
The arena is home to the Florida State Seminoles men's basketball and Florida State Seminoles women's basketball teams. Covering 18,000 square feet (1,700 m^{2}), this versatile Arena can accommodate 1,000 people for banquets and receptions for up to 2,000. The arena has upholstered seats for sporting events, concerts, touring Broadway productions and family shows. The arena can increase the capacity with risers. Risers are usually added on to the side of the arena wall blending in with the permanent seats. Risers are usually only given out to the events of wrestling, basketball and sometimes, concerts. The arena can be configured in a variety of seating arrangements for each type of event.

As a concert venue, the arena can seat between 2,372 and 12,041. As a convention center, it can accommodate 18,900 square feet (1760 m^{2}) in the main arena plus 35,000 square feet (3300 m^{2}) at the adjoining exhibit hall, in addition to 16,000 square feet (1500 m^{2}) of space at the meeting rooms. Concerts, sporting events, trade shows, Broadway shows, conventions, ice shows, circuses, and other events are held here annually.

The Centre Theater is a 6,000-seat theater configuration used for small concerts, preaching and other theater type events. The theater provides not only a traditional counterweight system for shows accustomed to a conventional theatre venue, but also for musical artists that prefer a more intimate performance space. It is equipped with a sound system capable of providing reinforcement for upper level and club seat fill, as well as motorized clusters that may be utilized for additional support. The Centre Theater has hosted the Tallahassee Broadway Series for the last 11 years and has presented such tours as Les Misérables, Riverdance, Cats, Beauty and the Beast, Chicago, Fosse and Rent. In addition, numerous musical artists have chosen to perform in this configuration.

=== Renovations ===
Prior to the summer of 2014, much of the existing infrastructure and equipment in use had been there since the arena opened in 1981. This included some equipment that was so outdated that it couldn't be replaced. Further deferred maintenance occurred while the arena was owned by Leon County and the City of Tallahassee.

FSU gave the arena a major renovation during the summer of 2014. The arena received new seats, Jumbotrons including new LED ribbon boards, and a new floor, all at the cost of $10 million. Before then, the only renovation occurred in 1998, when the facility's roof was replaced.

== History ==
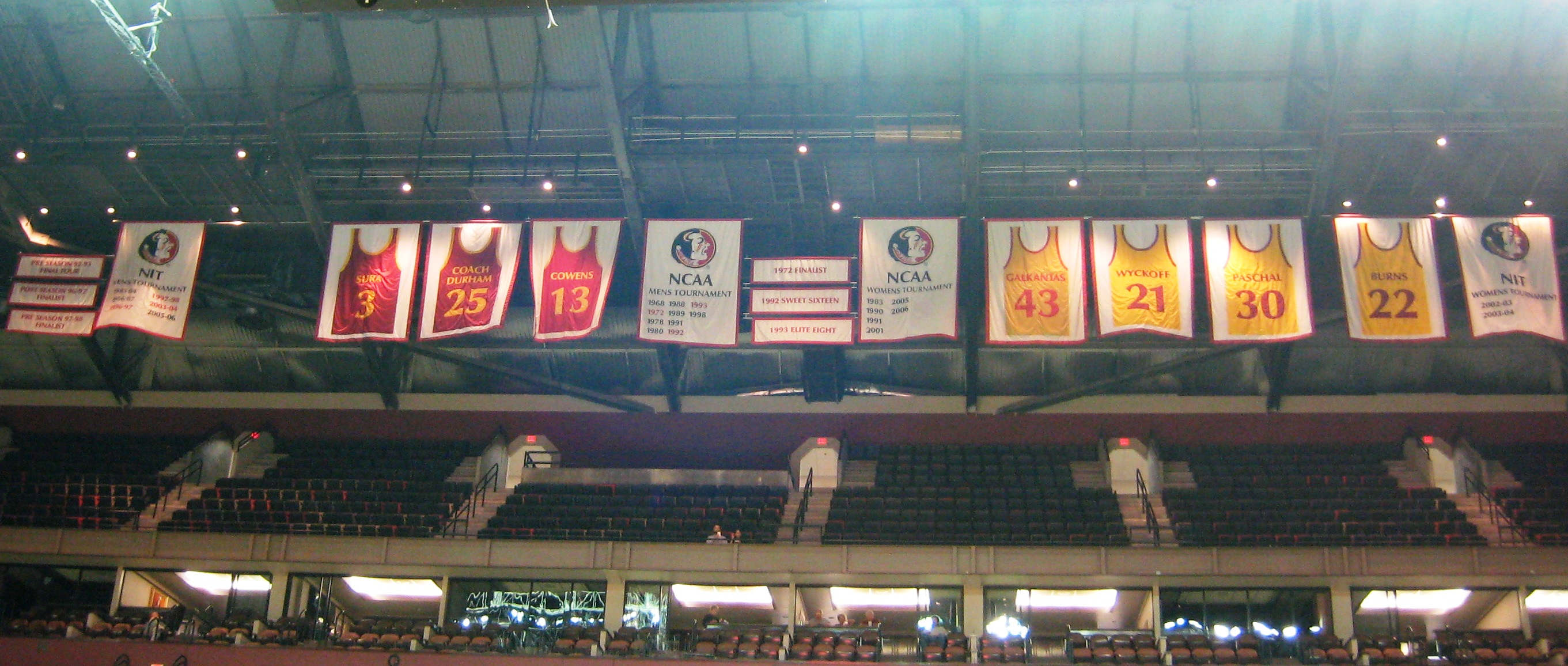
Banners hanging at the arena

The arena was named the Donald L. Tucker Civic Center in 1977 in honor of Donald L. Tucker, Esq., a former Speaker of the Florida House of Representatives and Special Ambassador for the United States to the Dominican Republic. Upon opening, the venue was named the Tallahassee-Leon County Civic Center. In 2001, the Florida Senate proposed reverting the civic center to its original name; however, this provision was vetoed. The center reverted to its original name in January 2012. The venue was owned by the Tallahassee Leon County Civic Center Authority until 2012.

The Civic Center has been the home to many sports teams. It has previously played host to tapings of WCW Thunder and WWF SmackDown!, WWE Live Events, men's and women's basketball tournaments and the inaugural League of Legends Mid-Season Invitational in 2015. It is also home to the Florida State Seminoles men's and women's basketball teams. Before they moved, it was also host to the Tallahassee Tiger Sharks ice hockey team of the ECHL. Other professional teams that called the center home included the Tallahassee Thunder of AF2 and the Tallahassee Scorpions soccer team of the EISL. In 2007 it was home to the Tallahassee Titans of the American Indoor Football Association. The team then left the AIFL for the World Indoor Football League but then folded after the owner failed to acquire enough capital to finance the team. The WIFL then folded as other members jumped to other leagues. The Tallahassee Tigers were a planned ABA team that could not find a home in the arena due to the Seminoles' basketball season conflicting with the Tigers' schedule. As a result, the team never made their anticipated 2007 debut in the ABA.

=== Notable shows ===
- October 11, 1981: The Kinks – Give the People What They Want Tour
- October 29, 1981: The Beach Boys
- April 9, 1982: Rush – Signals Tour
- June 9, 1982: Iron Maiden – The Beast on the Road tour
- October 31, 1983: The Police – Synchronicity Tour
- April 3, 1985: Prince – Purple Rain Tour
- November 7, 1985: Tina Turner – Private Dancer Tour, supported by Mr. Mister
- September 20, 1986 Elton John - Ice on Fire Tour
- September 11, 1988: Def Leppard - Hysteria Tour
- October 10, 1988: AC/DC – Blow Up Your Video Tour
- February 5, 1989: Bon Jovi – New Jersey Syndicate Tour
- May 10, 1990: Aerosmith – Pump Tour
- June 28, 1990: MC Hammer – Please Hammer Don't Hurt 'Em World Tour
- December 9, 1991: Van Halen – For Unlawful Carnal Knowledge Tour
- April 14, 1992: MC Hammer – Too Legit to Quit World Tour
- February 4, 1993: Metallica – Wherever We May Roam Tour
- December 2, 1993: Nirvana – In Utero Tour
- April 9, 1994: Smashing Pumpkins – Siamese Dream Tour
- October 19, 1996: Toni Braxton – Secrets Tour
- October 29, 1996: Phish
- November 21, 1997 Elton John - The Big Picture Tour
- August 13, 1999: The Moody Blues – Strange Times
- November 12, 1999: Kid Rock – Between The Legs Tour
- December 16, 1999: WWE Smackdown
- April 1, 2004: Aerosmith – Honkin on Bobo Tour
- June 10, 2007: T-Pain – Epiphany Tour
- February 10, 2008: Larry the Cable Guy
- February 29, 2008: Keith Urban/Carrie Underwood – Love, Pain and the Whole Crazy Carnival Ride Tour
- March 23, 2008: Elton John
- November 8, 2008: Trans-Siberian Orchestra
- December 2, 2008: Avenged Sevenfold/Shinedown – Avenged Sevenfold Tour
- January 16, 2009: TobyMac – Portable Sounds Tour
- January 27, 2009: 3 Doors Down
- May 4, 2010: Carrie Underwood – Play On Tour
- February 24, 2012: Drake – Club Paradise Tour
- February 28, 2012: Jimmy Buffett – Lounging at the Lagoon Tour
- March 9, 2012: Trans-Siberian Orchestra – Beethoven's Last Night Tour
- March 24, 2012: Eric Church – The Blood, Sweat & Beers Tour
- May 17, 2012: Miranda Lambert – On Fire Tour
- October 19, 2012: T.I. – War Chant (FSU Homecoming)
- February 21, 2013: Zac Brown Band
- February 24, 2013: Jeff Dunham – Disorderly Conduct Tour
- September 5, 2013: Jason Aldean – Night Train Tour
- January 24, 2014: Brad Paisley – Beat This Winter Tour
- October 24, 2014: Jake Owen – Days of Gold Tour
- April 21, 2014: Wiz Khalifa
- April 25, 2014: Darius Rucker
- September 9, 2014: Fitz and the Tantrums
- March 26, 2015: Eric Church – The Outsiders Tour
- May 7, 2015: Riot Games – The first League of Legends Mid-Season Invitational
- November 12, 2015: Zac Brown Band – Jekyll and Hyde Tour
- October 28, 2016: Lil Wayne/Rich Homie Quan
- January 27, 2017: Florida Georgia Line – Dig Your Roots Tour
- February 19, 2017: TobyMac, Matt Maher, Mandisa, Mac Powell, Capital Kings, Ryan Stevenson, Hollyn – Hits Deep Live

== See also ==
- Florida State Seminoles
- List of convention centers in the United States
- List of NCAA Division I basketball arenas
