= Laura Marie =

American singer-songwriter

- Born: September 11; San Antonio, Texas, United States
- Genres: Adult alternative, acoustic rock
- Occupation(s): Musician, singer-songwriter
- Instrument(s): Vocals, guitar
- Labels: Independent
- Website: http://www.lauramariemusic.com/

Laura Marie (born September 11 in San Antonio, Texas) is an American singer-songwriter. She was the lead singer of Texan band Sofa Kingdom, who disbanded after having released a studio album, Somewhere Else. Laura Marie worked with producer Mack Damon on her 2007 album, Drawn, as well as the 2010 follow up EP Last of the Ones. In 2012 she collaborated with Texan producer Jake Owen and released their first EP as a duo, Threadbare, as part of a PledgeMusic fundraising campaign to release Laura Marie's third record. Proving successful, the campaign resulted in a full-length album, The Season, released in February 2013. In 2015, Laura went back to the studio to record her latest project, which can be pre-ordered through her Bandcamp Subscription page.

== Career ==
=== Sofa Kingdom ===
In 1997, Laura Marie formed Sofa Kingdom with bassist JP Leal, initially as a duo, but were soon joined by guitarist Reza Kaleel and drummer Jason Barbosa. 2 years later, in 1999, they recorded and independently released their first studio album, Somewhere Else. After the album's release, Barbosa left the group and was replaced by Rudy Diaz. In 2001, the band changed their name to Things Between and started working on their second album, Undone, but decided to part ways for undisclosed reasons, so the project remained unreleased.

=== Solo career ===
After Sofa Kingdom disbanded, Laura Marie continued writing and recording with Mack Damon, the producer of Somewhere Else. Her solo debut album, Drawn, was released in 2007 and was followed by a 6-track EP, Last of the Ones, in 2010. On February 17 of the same year, she released her first music video for the song Love You Like Me.

=== Threadbare and The season ===
On October 29, 2012, after working together in the studio for several months, Laura Marie & Jake Owen successfully launched a campaign, called The Threadbare Project, to raise funds for the making of a new album in 2013. The Threadbare EP was first released digitally on PledgeMusic, on November 2, 2012 and was followed by a CD release along with the resulting album, The Season, on February 27, 2013.

=== Stars Apart ===
In March 2015, Laura Marie returned to the studio to record her new album, which can be pre-ordered through her Bandcamp Subscription page. On May 15, the name of the project was announced to be Stars Apart.

== Personal life ==
Laura Marie was born and raised in San Antonio. She attended St. Mary's University, Texas, where she earned a bachelor's degree in music education concentrating in composition. She has been married for several years and is a mother of two.

== Discography ==
With Sofa Kingdom
Somewhere Else (1999)

Solo
Drawn (2007)
Last of the Ones (2010)
Threadbare (2012)
The Season (2013)
Stars Apart (2015)
Too Sweet: Songs for Setting Boundaries (2023)
