= Startin' with Me =

Studio album by Jake Owen
- Released: July 25, 2006
- Genre: Country
- Length: 38:40
- Label: RCA Nashville
- Producer: Jimmy Ritchey

Jake Owen chronology
Startin' with Me (2006)	Easy Does It (2009)

Singles from Startin' with Me
- 1. "Yee Haw" Released: February 27, 2006; 2. "Startin' with Me" Released: October 2, 2006; 3. "Something About a Woman" Released: August 13, 2007

Professional ratings
Review scores
Source	Rating
AllMusic	2.5/5 stars

Startin' with Me is the debut studio album by American country music artist Jake Owen, released in July 2006 (see 2006 in country music) on RCA Records Nashville. Singles released from the album include "Yee Haw", the title track, and "Something About a Woman", all of which have charted on the Billboard Hot Country Songs charts. "Yee Haw", the first of these three, reached number 16, "Startin' with Me" was the highest-peaking, at number 6, and "Something About a Woman" peaked at number 15.

Owen wrote the song "Ghosts" for Kenny Chesney. Although Chesney expressed interest in the song, he ultimately did not record it. Also included on this album is "You Can Thank Dixie", which Jake Owen recorded as a duet with former Alabama lead singer Randy Owen (no relation). Jake Owen re-recorded "Eight Second Ride" on his second album, 2009's Easy Does It, and released this rendition as a single in 2009.

== Track listing ==
No.	Title	Writer(s)	Length
1.	"The Bad In Me"	Jake Owen, Brett James, Ritchey	3:25
2.	"Something About a Woman"	Owen, Bob Regan, Ritchey	3:13
3.	"Startin' with Me"	Kendell Marvel, Ritchey, Owen	3:56
4.	"Yee Haw"	Casey Beathard, Marvel, Owen	2:52
5.	"Ghosts"	Chuck Jones, Ritchey, Owen	3:51
6.	"Eight Second Ride"	Eric Durrance, Owen	3:04
7.	"Hard Not to Love You"	Marvel, Ritchey, Owen	3:19
8.	"The Bottle and Me"	Wes Hightower, Ritchey, Owen	3:03
9.	"Places to Run"	Marvel, Ritchey, Owen	3:30
10.	"Long Night with You"	Jones, Ritchey, Owen	3:55
11.	"You Can Thank Dixie" (duet with Randy Owen)	Marvel, Ritchey, Owen	4:26
Total length:			38:40

== Personnel ==
- Kenny Aronoff - drums
- Pat Buchanan - electric guitar
- Lisa Cochran - background vocals
- Eric Darken - percussion
- Larry Franklin - fiddle
- Paul Franklin - dobro, steel guitar, lap steel guitar
- David Grissom - electric guitar
- Wes Hightower - background vocals
- Kirk "Jelly Roll" Johnson - harmonica
- B. James Lowry - acoustic guitar
- Brent Mason - acoustic guitar, electric guitar
- Jake Owen - lead vocals
- Randy Owen - duet vocals on "You Can Thank Dixie"
- Jimmy Ritchey - acoustic guitar, baritone guitar, electric guitar, mandolin
- John Wesley Ryles - background vocals
- Glenn Worf - bass guitar
- Jonathan Yudkin - cello, string arrangements, viola, violin

== Chart performance ==
=== Album ===
Chart (2006)	Peak position
U.S. Billboard Top Country Albums	8
U.S. Billboard 200	31
