= Easy Does It (Jake Owen album) =

Studio album by Jake Owen
- Released: February 24, 2009
- Genre: Country
- Label: RCA Nashville
- Producer: Jimmy Ritchey

Jake Owen chronology
Startin' with Me (2006)	Easy Does It (2009)	Barefoot Blue Jean Night (2011)

Singles from Easy Does It
- 1. "Don't Think I Can't Love You" Released: August 25, 2008; 2. "Eight Second Ride" Released: June 15, 2009; 3. "Tell Me" Released: April 12, 2010

Professional ratings
Review scores
Source	Rating
Allmusic	3/5 stars
Engine 145	2.5/5 stars
Roughstock	favorable

Easy Does It is the second studio album by American country music singer Jake Owen. It was released on February 24, 2009, by RCA Records Nashville. It includes the Top 10 hits "Don't Think I Can't Love You" and "Eight Second Ride." As with his first album, Easy Does It is produced by Jimmy Ritchey, with whom Owen co-wrote several of the songs. It has sold 120,000 copies as of November 2009.

== Content ==
Owen co-wrote eight of the ten songs on the album. Among the co-writes are the lead-off single "Don't Think I Can't Love You", which became his highest-charting single with a peak of number 2 on the Billboard Hot Country Songs chart on April 21, 2009. "Eight Second Ride", the album's second single, is a re-recording of a song from Owen's 2006 debut album Startin' with Me. "Tell Me" was the album's third single.

== Track listing ==
No.	Title	Writer(s)	Length
1.	"Tell Me"	Jake Owen, Jimmy Ritchey, Don Poythress	4:38
2.	"Eight Second Ride"	Eric Durrance, Owen	3:07
3.	"Easy Does It"	Owen, Ritchey, Patrick Jason Matthews	3:35
4.	"Don't Think I Can't Love You"	Owen, Ritchey, Kendell Marvel	3:05
5.	"Cherry on Top"	Mark Stephen Jones, Travis Meadows	3:37
6.	"Who Said Whiskey (Was Meant to Drink a Woman Away)"	Owen, Ritchey, Rob Hatch	3:27
7.	"Green Bananas"	Owen, Ritchey, Bob Regan	3:20
8.	"Anything for You"	Owen, Ritchey, Regan	3:52
9.	"Every Reason I Go Back"	Owen, Casey Beathard, Dave Turnbull	3:34
10.	"Nothin' Grows in Shadows"	Rhett Akins, Dallas Davidson, Doug Johnson	5:01

== Personnel ==
- Kenny Aronoff - drums
- Skip Cleavinger - bagpipes on "Nothin' Grows in Shadows"
- Eric Darken - percussion
- Paul Franklin - steel guitar, lap steel guitar, dobro
- David Grissom - electric guitar
- Tania Hancheroff - background vocals
- Wes Hightower - background vocals
- Mark Hill - bass guitar
- Tim Lauer - keyboards
- B. James Lowry - acoustic guitar
- Brent Mason - electric guitar
- Gordon Mote - keyboards
- Jake Owen - lead vocals
- Jimmy Ritchey - acoustic guitar, electric guitar
- Glenn Worf - bass guitar

== Chart performance ==
=== Weekly charts ===
Chart (2009)	Peak position
US Billboard 200	13
US Top Country Albums (Billboard)	2

=== Year-end charts ===
Chart (2009)	Position
US Top Country Albums (Billboard)	55
Chart (2010)	Position
US Top Country Albums (Billboard)	74
