= Avenged Sevenfold Tour =

2007–09 concert tour by Avenged Sevenfold

- Tour by Avenged Sevenfold
- Location: Asia; Europe; North America; Oceania; South America
- Associated album: Avenged Sevenfold
- Start date: October 29, 2007
- End date: August 2, 2009
- Legs: 11

Avenged Sevenfold concert chronology
- Cities of Evil Tour (2004–07); Avenged Sevenfold Tour (2007–09); Nightmare Tour (2010–11)

The Avenged Sevenfold Tour was a concert tour by American heavy metal band Avenged Sevenfold between 2007 and 2009, promoting their album Avenged Sevenfold. It was the band's last tour with longtime drummer Jimmy "The Rev" Sullivan, who died on December 28, 2009. The tour began on October 29, 2007, with a North American leg, shortly after the band finished its previous tour in support of City of Evil. The tour ended on August 2, 2009, at the Sonisphere Festival in Knebworth, England.

== Background ==
During the band's North American leg in autumn 2008, after a show on September 6, 2008, singer M. Shadows had difficulties singing, and flew to see his doctor, cancelling the Baltimore show the next day. The whole co-headlining tour with Buckcherry was then cancelled because of Shadows' case of vocal fatigue. The band resumed the tour after Shadows took some rest, with a short Japanese leg starting on October 15, 2008, and then on November 4, 2008, the band rescheduled its cancelled North American leg and played through November and December a co-headlining tour with Buckcherry and the support acts Shinedown and Saving Abel, in place of the cancelled tour.

The summer leg 2008 was as an opening act for Iron Maiden. The band also played three dates in June 2009, in support of Metallica.

During the band's headlining of the North American Taste of Chaos 2008 tour, it recorded the April 10, 2008, performance, for its first live DVD, entitled Live in the LBC & Diamonds in the Rough, which was a bundle of a live DVD, and a CD of B-sides and unreleased tracks from the Avenged Sevenfold album.

On 16 April 2009, Guns N' Roses guitarist Slash joined the band on stage to play a cover version of the Guns N' Roses song "It's So Easy".

== Tour dates ==
Date	City	Country	Venue
North American leg 1 Support acts: Black Tide, The Confession and Operator
October 29, 2007	Los Angeles	United States	The Wiltern
October 31, 2007	Las Vegas	United States	House of Blues
November 2, 2007	Albuquerque	United States	Sunshine Theatre
November 4, 2007	Denver	United States	Ogden Theatre
November 5, 2007	Omaha	United States	Sokol Auditorium
November 6, 2007	St. Louis	United States	Pageant
November 8, 2007	Chicago	United States	Congress Theater
November 9, 2007	Detroit	United States	State Theatre
November 10, 2007	Columbus	United States	Lifestyles Pavilion
November 12, 2007	Providence	United States	Lupo's Heartbreak Hotel
November 14, 2007	New York City	United States	Hammerstein Ballroom
November 15, 2007	Philadelphia	United States	Electric Factory
November 17, 2007	Myrtle Beach	United States	House of Blues
November 18, 2007	Atlanta	United States	The Tabernacle
November 20, 2007	Charlotte	United States	Amos' Southend
November 21, 2007	Richmond	United States	Toad's Place
November 23, 2007	Orlando	United States	House of Blues
November 24, 2007	St. Petersburg	United States	Jannus Landing
November 25, 2007	Fort Lauderdale	United States	Revolution
November 27, 2007	New Orleans	United States	House of Blues
November 28, 2007	Houston	United States	Warehouse Live
November 30, 2007	Corpus Christi	United States	Concrete Street Amphitheater
December 1, 2007	Austin	United States	La Zona Rosa
December 2, 2007	Tulsa	United States	Cain's Ballroom
December 4, 2007	Lubbock	United States	The Pavilion
December 6, 2007	Tucson	United States	Rialto Theatre
December 7, 2007	San Diego	United States	San Diego Sports Arena
December 8, 2007	Los Angeles	United States	KROQ Almost Acoustic Christmas
December 9, 2007	Chico	United States	Senator Theater
December 10, 2007	San Francisco	United States	The Warfield
December 11, 2007	Fresno	United States	Rainbow Ballroom
December 13, 2007	Portland	United States	Roseland Theatre
December 14, 2007	Grand Prairie	United States	Nokia Theatre at Grand Prairie
December 16, 2007	Seattle	United States	Showbox at the Market
December 17, 2007	Spokane	United States	Knitting Factory
December 19, 2007	Blackfoot	United States	El Rey
Asian leg 1
January 6, 2008	Tokyo	Japan	Studio Coast
January 8, 2008	Nagoya	Japan	Diamond Hall
January 9, 2008	Osaka	Japan	Namba Hatch
January 11, 2008	Yokohama	Japan	Yokohama Blitz
European leg 1 Support acts: Black Tide and Bloodsimple
January 17, 2008	Southampton	England	Southampton Guildhall
January 18, 2008	Norwich	England	Norwich U.E.A.
January 20, 2008	Wolverhampton	England	Wolverhampton Civic Hall
January 21, 2008	Manchester	England	Club Academy
January 23, 2008	Nottingham	England	Rock City
January 24, 2008	London	England	Brixton Academy
January 26, 2008	Leeds	England	Leeds University Union
January 27, 2008	Cardiff	Wales	Cardiff University
January 29, 2008	Newcastle upon Tyne	England	O2 Academy Newcastle 2 (Bleeding Through filling in for Bloodsimple)
January 30, 2008	Glasgow	Scotland	O2 Academy Glasgow
February 1, 2008	Dublin	Ireland	Ambassador Theatre
North American leg 2 (Taste of Chaos Tour 2008) w/ Bullet for My Valentine, Atreyu, Blessthefall and Idiot Pilot Support acts: D'espairsRay, The Underneath and Mucc
February 29, 2008	Denver	United States	Fillmore Auditorium
March 1, 2008	Kansas City	United States	Memorial Hall
March 2, 2008	Milwaukee	United States	Eagles Ballroom
March 4, 2008	Saint Paul	United States	Roy Wilkins Auditorium
March 5, 2008	St. Charles	United States	Family Arena
March 7, 2008	Trotwood	United States	Hara Arena
March 8, 2008	Detroit	United States	Cobo Hall
March 10, 2008	Rochester	United States	Main Street Armory
March 11, 2008	Chicago	United States	Aragon Ballroom
March 13, 2008	Norfolk	United States	Constant Convocation Center
March 14, 2008	Camden	United States	Tweeter Center
March 15, 2008	Asbury Park	United States	Asbury Park Convention Hall
March 17, 2008	Washington, D.C.	United States	Patriot Center
March 18, 2008	Portland	United States	Cumberland County Civic Center
March 20, 2008	Uniondale	United States	Nassau Coliseum
March 21, 2008	Lowell	United States	Tsongas Arena
March 22, 2008	Albany	United States	Washington Avenue Armory
March 24, 2008	Duluth	United States	Gwinnett Center
March 25, 2008	Tampa	United States	USF Sundome
March 26, 2008	Miami	United States	Bayfront Park
March 28, 2008	Orlando	United States	UCF Arena
March 29, 2008	Biloxi	United States	Mississippi Coast Coliseum
March 30, 2008	Little Rock	United States	River Market Amphitheatre
April 1, 2008	Grand Prairie	United States	Nokia Theatre at Grand Prairie
April 3, 2008	Oklahoma City	United States	Fairgrounds Arena
April 4, 2008	Corpus Christi	United States	Concrete Street Amphitheater
April 5, 2008	San Antonio	United States	Freeman Coliseum
April 6, 2008	El Paso	United States	El Paso County Coliseum
April 8, 2008	Las Vegas	United States	The Pearl Concert Theater at the Palms
April 9, 2008	Glendale	United States	Jobing.com Arena
April 10, 2008	Long Beach	United States	Long Beach Arena (Recorded for a live DVD)
April 12, 2008	San Jose	United States	Event Center
April 13, 2008	Sacramento	United States	ARCO Arena
April 15, 2008	Seattle	United States	WaMu Theater
April 17, 2008	Vancouver	Canada	PNE Forum
April 19, 2008	Calgary	Canada	Stampede Corral
April 21, 2008	Regina	Canada	Brandt Centre
April 22, 2008	Edmonton	Canada	Northlands Agricom
Oceania leg 1 w/ Bullet for My Valentine and Atreyu Support act: Behind Crimson Eyes
May 6, 2008	Brisbane	Australia	Riverstage
May 7, 2008	Sydney	Australia	Hordern Pavilion
May 8, 2008	Adelaide	Australia	Thebarton Theatre
May 10, 2008	Melbourne	Australia	Festival Hall
May 11, 2008	Perth	Australia	Metro City
May 12, 2008	Perth	Australia	Metro City
May 14, 2008	Auckland	New Zealand	Auckland Town Hall
South American leg 1
May 27, 2008	Santiago	Chile	Teatro Caupolicán
May 29, 2008	São Paulo	Brazil	Citibank Hall
May 31, 2008	Mexico City	Mexico	Vive Cuervo Salón
European leg 2 Supporting Iron Maiden, w/ Lauren Harris
June 24, 2008	Arendal	Norway	Hove Festival
June 27, 2008	Bologna	Italy	Gods of Metal
June 29, 2008	Dessel	Belgium	Graspop Metal Meeting
July 1, 2008	Paris	France	Palais Omnisports de Paris-Bercy
July 2, 2008	Paris	France	Palais Omnisports de Paris-Bercy
July 4, 2008	Löbnitz	Germany	With Full Force Festival
July 5, 2008	London	England	Twickenham Stadium
July 9, 2008	Lisbon	Portugal	Super Bock Super Rock
July 11, 2008	Mérida	Spain	Via de la Plata Festival
~~July 12, 2008~~	~~Zaragoza~~	~~Spain~~	~~Monsters of Rock~~
July 16, 2008	Stockholm	Sweden	Stockholm Olympic Stadium
July 18, 2008	Helsinki	Finland	Helsinki Olympic Stadium
July 19, 2008	Tampere	Finland	Ratinan Stadion
July 22, 2008	Trondheim	Norway	Lerkendal Stadion
July 24, 2008	Oslo	Norway	Valle Hovin
July 26, 2008	Gothenburg	Sweden	Ullevi Stadium
July 27, 2008	Horsens	Denmark	Horsens Gods Bane Pladsen
Headlining dates
July 30, 2008	Zürich	Switzerland	Rohstofflager
July 31, 2008	Wacken	Germany	Wacken Open Air
August 20, 2008	London	England	London Astoria
August 22, 2008	Leeds	England	Leeds Festival
~~August 24, 2008~~	~~Reading~~	England	~~Reading Festival~~
North American leg 3 Support act: Bleeding Through
September 6, 2008	Huntington, West Virginia	United States	X-Fest
~~September 7, 2008~~	~~Baltimore~~	~~United States~~	~~Rams Head Live!~~
~~September 9, 2008~~	~~Quebec City~~	~~Canada~~	~~Pavillon de la Jeunesse~~
~~September 10, 2008~~	~~Montreal~~	~~Canada~~	~~Métropolis~~
~~September 11, 2008~~	~~Toronto~~	~~Canada~~	~~Sound Academy~~
~~September 13, 2008~~	~~Chicago~~	~~United States~~	~~Q101 Block Party~~
~~September 14, 2008~~	~~Dayton, Ohio~~	~~United States~~	~~X-Fest~~
w/ Buckcherry Support acts: Saving Abel and Shinedown
~~September 16, 2008~~	~~Moline~~	~~United States~~	~~iWireless Center~~
~~September 18, 2008~~	~~Sioux Falls~~	~~United States~~	~~Sioux Falls Stadium~~
~~September 19, 2008~~	~~Bonner Springs~~	~~United States~~	~~Sandstone Amphitheater~~
~~September 20, 2008~~	~~Maryland Heights~~	~~United States~~	~~KPNT Pointfest~~
~~September 22, 2008~~	~~Lincoln~~	~~United States~~	~~Pershing Center~~
~~September 23, 2008~~	~~Valley Center~~	~~United States~~	~~Kansas Coliseum~~
~~September 24, 2008~~	~~Tulsa~~	~~United States~~	~~Riverparks~~
~~September 26, 2008~~	~~Huntsville~~	~~United States~~	~~Big Spring Jam~~
~~September 28, 2008~~	~~Knoxville~~	~~United States~~	~~Civic Coliseum~~
~~September 30, 2008~~	~~Clemson~~	~~United States~~	~~Littlejohn Coliseum~~
~~October 4, 2008~~	~~Mobile~~	~~United States~~	~~Bayfest~~
Asian leg 2
October 15, 2008	Osaka	Japan	Namba Hatch
October 16, 2008	Nagoya	Japan	Diamond Hall
October 18, 2008	Tokyo	Japan	Loud Park Festival
October 20, 2008	Tokyo	Japan	Studio Coast
October 22, 2008	Jakarta	Indonesia	Tennis Indoor Arena
October 24, 2008	Central Area	Singapore	The MAX Pavilion
North American leg 3 (rescheduled) w/ Buckcherry Support acts: Saving Abel and Shinedown
~~November 2, 2008~~	~~Sioux City~~	~~United States~~	~~Gateway Arena~~
November 4, 2008	Casper	United States	Casper Events Center
November 5, 2008	Billings	United States	Rimrock Auto Arena at MetraPark
~~November 6, 2008~~	~~Rapid City~~	~~United States~~	~~Rushmore Plaza Civic Center~~
November 8, 2008	Saint Paul	United States	Roy Wilkins Auditorium
November 9, 2008	Fargo	United States	Fargodome
November 11, 2008	Bloomington	United States	U.S. Cellular Coliseum
November 12, 2008	Milwaukee	United States	Eagles Ballroom
November 14, 2008	Madison	United States	Alliant Energy Center
November 15, 2008	Waterloo	United States	McElroy Auditorium
November 16, 2008	La Crosse	United States	La Crosse Center
November 18, 2008	Walker	United States	DeltaPlex Arena
November 19, 2008	Evansville	United States	Roberts Municipal Stadium
November 21, 2008	Ypsilanti	United States	EMU Convocation Center
November 22, 2008	Youngstown	United States	Covelli Centre
November 23, 2008	Columbus	United States	Jerome Schottenstein Center
November 25, 2008	Tupelo	United States	BancorpSouth Arena
November 26, 2008	Biloxi	United States	Mississippi Coast Coliseum
November 29, 2008	Greensboro	United States	Greensboro Coliseum
November 30, 2008	Augusta	United States	James Brown Arena
December 2, 2008	Tallahassee	United States	Leon County Civic Center
December 3, 2008	Orlando	United States	UCF Arena
Headlining dates
December 5, 2008	Fort Myers	United States	City of Palms Park
December 6, 2008	West Palm Beach	United States	Buzz Bake Sale
December 7, 2008	Tampa	United States	97X Next Big Thing
Support acts: Burn Halo and Shadows Fall
December 9, 2008	Baltimore	United States	Rams Head Live!
December 10, 2008	Baltimore	United States	Rams Head Live!
December 12, 2008	Atlantic City	United States	House of Blues
December 13, 2008	Wallingford	United States	Chevrolet Theatre
December 15, 2008	Quebec City	Canada	Pavillon de la Jeunesse
December 16, 2008	Montreal	Canada	Métropolis
December 17, 2008	Toronto	Canada	Sound Academy
North American leg 4 w/ Papa Roach and Buckcherry Support acts: Saving Abel and Burn Halo (one support slot each night)
January 28, 2009	Salt Lake City	United States	E Center
January 30, 2009	Glendale	United States	Jobing.com Arena
January 31, 2009	Albuquerque	United States	Tingley Coliseum
February 2, 2009	Bakersfield	United States	Rabobank Arena
February 3, 2009	Oakland	United States	Oracle Arena
February 5, 2009	Yakima	United States	Yakima SunDome
February 6, 2009	Portland	United States	Memorial Coliseum
February 7, 2009	Tacoma	United States	Tacoma Dome
February 9, 2009	Spokane	United States	Star Theater
February 10, 2009	Great Falls	United States	Four Seasons Arena
February 12, 2009	Rapid City	United States	Rushmore Plaza Civic Center
February 13, 2009	Mankato	United States	Alltel Center
February 14, 2009	Council Bluffs	United States	Mid-America Center
~~February 16, 2009~~	~~Fort Wayne~~	~~United States~~	~~Allen County War Memorial Coliseum~~
February 17, 2009	St. Charles	United States	Family Arena
February 19, 2009	Indianapolis	United States	Murat Centre
February 20, 2009	Cleveland	United States	Wolstein Center
February 21, 2009	Battle Creek	United States	Kellogg Arena
February 23, 2009	Highland Heights	United States	The Bank of Kentucky Center
February 24, 2009	Pikeville	United States	Eastern Kentucky Expo Center
February 25, 2009	Pittsburgh	United States	Petersen Events Center
February 27, 2009	Rosemont	United States	Allstate Arena
w/ Papa Roach and Buckcherry Support act: Burn Halo
March 19, 2009	Camden	United States	Susquehanna Bank Center
March 20, 2009	Utica	United States	Utica Memorial Auditorium
March 21, 2009	Hershey	United States	Giant Center
March 23, 2009	Columbus	United States	Columbus Civic Center
March 24, 2009	Chattanooga	United States	Soldiers and Sailors Memorial Auditorium
March 26, 2009	Johnson City	United States	Freedom Hall Civic Center
March 27, 2009	Lexington	United States	Rupp Arena
March 28, 2009	Asheville	United States	Asheville Civic Center
March 30, 2009	Nashville	United States	Sommet Center
March 31, 2009	Memphis	United States	Minglewood Hall
April 2, 2009	Poplar Bluff	United States	Amphitheater
April 3, 2009	Grand Island	United States	Heartland Events Center
April 4, 2009	Topeka	United States	Topeka Event Center
April 6, 2009	Tulsa	United States	Brady Theater
April 7, 2009	Belton	United States	Bell County Expo Center
~~April 9, 2009~~	~~Amarillo~~	~~United States~~	~~Amarillo Civic Center~~
April 10, 2009	Lubbock	United States	LoneStar Amphitheater
April 11, 2009	Las Cruces	United States	Pan American Center
~~April 13, 2009~~	~~Prescott Valley~~	~~United States~~	~~Tim's Toyota Center~~
April 13, 2009	Colorado Springs	United States	World Arena
April 16, 2009	Los Angeles	United States	Nokia Theatre (featuring Slash)
April 17, 2009	San Diego	United States	San Diego Sports Arena
w/ Atreyu
April 18, 2009	Las Vegas	United States	The Joint
Supporting Korn, w/ The Used
May 15, 2009	Clarkston	United States	DTE Energy Music Theatre
Headlining date
May 17, 2009	Columbus	United States	Crew Stadium
South American leg 2
May 24, 2009	Santiago	Chile	Scream Crazy Fest
Supporting Metallica, w/ Resorte
June 4, 2009	Mexico City	Mexico	Foro Sol
June 6, 2009	Mexico City	Mexico	Foro Sol
June 7, 2009	Mexico City	Mexico	Foro Sol
European leg 3
August 1, 2009	Dublin	Ireland	Marlay Park
August 2, 2009	Hertfordshire	England	Sonisphere Festival

== Personnel ==
- M. Shadows – lead vocals, organ on "Critical Acclaim"
- Zacky Vengeance – rhythm guitar, acoustic guitar, backing vocals
- The Rev – drums, percussion, backing vocals, co-lead vocals
- Synyster Gates – lead guitar, backing vocals
- Johnny Christ – bass guitar, backing vocals
