= If He Ain't Gonna Love You =

Single by Jake Owen

from the album American Love
- Released: October 17, 2016
- Recorded: 2016
- Genre: Country
- Length: 3:36
- Label: RCA Nashville
- Songwriters: Luke Laird; Shane McAnally; Chris Stapleton
- Producers: Ross Copperman; Shane McAnally; Luke Laird

Jake Owen singles chronology
"American Country Love Song" (2016)	"If He Ain't Gonna Love You" (2016)	"Good Company" (2017)

"If He Ain't Gonna Love You" is a song recorded by American country music singer Jake Owen. Released on October 17, 2016, it is the second single from his fifth studio album for RCA Nashville, American Love. The song stalled on the charts at its peak of number 37 for several weeks and became Owen's lowest-charting single of his career.

== Content ==
The song is an R&B-influenced country song featuring backing vocals from Chris Stapleton, who co-wrote the song with Shane McAnally and Luke Laird. It features "heavy bass and guitar" and is about a man pleading a woman to leave an unsatisfactory relationship in favor of starting one with him instead. Owen said that he chose to include Stapleton, who did not yet have a solo album at the time of the song's recording, after hearing him sing on demos, including the one for "If He Ain't Gonna Love You".

== Critical reception ==
Billy Dukes of Taste of Country reviewed the single favorably, praising the "progressive production" while saying that the song is "an all-out jam that dares you not to dance." An article on the song in Rolling Stone called it "a sharp right turn from the laid-back beach vibe Owen's often associated with. It also reflects some of the angsty, battle-cry turmoil of his recent divorce."

== Charts ==
Chart (2016–2017)	Peak position
US Country Airplay (Billboard)	37
US Hot Country Songs (Billboard)	45
