= Lovin' You Against My Will =

Single by Gary Allan

from the album Smoke Rings in the Dark
- B-side: "I'm the One"
- Released: April 1, 2000
- Recorded: 1999
- Genre: Country
- Length: 3:58
- Label: MCA Nashville
- Songwriter(s): Jamie O'Hara
- Producer(s): Tony Brown; Mark Wright; Byron Hill

Gary Allan singles chronology
"Smoke Rings in the Dark" (1999)	"Lovin' You Against My Will" (2000)	"Right Where I Need to Be" (2000)

"Lovin' You Against My Will" is a song written by Jamie O'Hara and recorded by American country music artist Gary Allan. It was released in April 2000 as the second single from Allan's 1999 album Smoke Rings in the Dark. The song reached number 34 on the U.S. Billboard Hot Country Singles & Tracks chart.

== Content ==
The song is about a man's emotions and lack of willpower when dealing with infidelity.

== Critical reception ==
An uncredited review in Billboard was favorable, praising the electric guitar and a string section, while comparing the song's sound to a mix of Johnny Rivers and Bruce Springsteen.

== Chart performance ==
Chart (2000)	Peak position
US Hot Country Songs (Billboard)	34
