= Yee Haw =

Single by Jake Owen

from the album Startin' with Me
- Released: February 27, 2006
- Genre: Country
- Length: 2:52
- Label: RCA Nashville
- Songwriters: Jake Owen; Casey Beathard; Kendell Marvel
- Producer: Jimmy Ritchey

Jake Owen singles chronology
"Yee Haw" (2006)	"Startin' with Me" (2006)

Music video
- "Yee Haw" at CMT.com

"Yee Haw" is a song co-written and recorded by American country music artist Jake Owen. It was released in February 2006 as his debut single and the first from his debut album Startin' with Me. The song peaked at number 16 on the US Billboard Hot Country Songs chart, and reached number 83 on the Billboard Hot 100. Owen wrote this song with Casey Beathard and Kendell Marvel.

== Content ==
The song is an up-tempo party anthem in which Owen highlights the various events at a party in a bar.

== Critical reception ==
Mason Stewart of AllMusic described the song as "try[ing] so desperately hard to establish Owen's image as a bad-ass hellraiser that [it] finally become[s] comical". In 2017, Billboard contributor Chuck Dauphin put "Yee Haw" at number five on his top 10 list of Owen's best songs.

== Music video ==
The music video was directed by Wes Edwards and premiered in early 2006.

== Chart performance ==
"Yee Haw" debuted at number 60 on the U.S. Billboard Hot Country Songs for the week of March 11, 2006.

Chart (2006)	Peak position
US Hot Country Songs (Billboard)	16
US Billboard Hot 100	83
