= Startin' with Me (song) =

Single by Jake Owen

from the album Startin' with Me
- Released: October 2, 2006
- Genre: Country
- Length: 3:56
- Label: RCA Nashville
- Songwriters: Kendell Marvel; Jake Owen; Jimmy Ritchey
- Producer: Jimmy Ritchey

Jake Owen singles chronology
"Yee Haw" (2006)	"Startin' with Me" (2006)	"Something About a Woman" (2007)

Music video
- "Startin' with Me" at CMT.com

"Startin' with Me" is a song co-written and recorded by American country music artist Jake Owen. It was released in October 2006 as the second single and title track from his debut album of the same name. The song became Owen's first Top 10 hit on the US Billboard Hot Country Songs chart at number 6.

== Content ==
The song chronicles various events in the singer's life, such as pawning his grandfather's guitar, losing his job, fighting with his father, and having a one-night stand with his "best friend's baby sister". In the chorus, the singer wishes that he had not done so much wrong, stating that he would change his life if he could. Owen wrote the song with Kendell Marvel and Jimmy Ritchey.

== Music video ==
The music video was directed by Shaun Silva and premiered in early 2007. It features Owen performing the song with a microphone in a room full of mirrors. Within certain mirrors, flashbacks reveal scenes of Owen as a younger boy depicting scenes reflected in the song's lyrics. Owen's twin brother Jared makes a cameo in the video.

== Chart performance ==
Chart (2006–2007)	Peak position
US Hot Country Songs (Billboard)	6
US Billboard Hot 100	83

=== Year-end charts ===
Chart (2007)	Position
US Country Songs (Billboard)	35
