= Smoke Rings in the Dark (song) =

Single by Gary Allan

from the album Smoke Rings in the Dark
- B-side: "Right Where I Need to Be"
- Released: August 9, 1999
- Recorded: 1999
- Genre: Country
- Length: 4:18
- Label: MCA Nashville
- Songwriters: Rivers Rutherford; Houston Robert
- Producers: Mark Wright; Tony Brown; Byron Hill

Gary Allan singles chronology
"I'll Take Today" (1998)	"Smoke Rings in the Dark" (1999)	"Lovin' You Against My Will" (2000)

"Smoke Rings in the Dark" is a song written by Rivers Rutherford and Houston Robert and recorded by American country music artist Gary Allan. It was released in August 1999 as the first single and title track from Allan's 1999 album of the same name. The song peaked at number 12 on the U.S. Billboard Hot Country Songs chart in February 2000. It also reached 76 on the Billboard Hot 100 and became his highest-charting single in Canada at number 5.

== Content ==
The song deals with the pain of unrequited love. The narrator states that all he will leave his significant other like "smoke rings in the dark."

== Critical reception ==
Chuck Taylor of Billboard magazine reviewed the song favorably, saying that "the production, songwriting, and performance combine to create a record that leaves a stunning impression." Taylor calls Allan's performance "wonderfully nuanced" and saying that the production has a "decidedly retro feel."

== Music video ==
The music video was directed by Chris Rogers.

== Chart positions ==
"Smoke Rings in the Dark" debuted at number 71 on the U.S. Billboard Hot Country Singles & Tracks chart for the week of August 14, 1999.

Chart (1999–2000)	Peak position
Canada Country Singles (RPM)	5
US Billboard Hot 100	76
US Hot Country Songs (Billboard)	12

=== Year-end charts ===
Chart (2000)	Position
US Country Songs (Billboard)	66
