= Good Company (Jake Owen song) =

Single by Jake Owen

from the album American Love
- Released: April 17, 2017
- Genre: Country
- Length: 2:54
- Label: RCA Nashville
- Songwriters: Matt Alderman; Tommy Cecil; Jared Mullins
- Producers: Lukas Bracewell; Jake Owen

Jake Owen singles chronology
"If He Ain't Gonna Love You" (2016)	"Good Company" (2017)	"I Was Jack (You Were Diane)" (2018)

"Good Company" is a song recorded by American country music singer Jake Owen. It is the third and final single from his 2016 album American Love, and his last single for RCA Records Nashville.

== Content ==
The song was written by Matt Alderman, Tommy Cecil, and Jared Mullins, with production handled by Owen and Lukas Bracewell.

Owen described the song to Billboard as follows: "The song to me really parallels with what the song feels like. I love songs like that where you can almost put yourself in a place and imagine where you are – [“Good Company”] is where you would be with your friends and family, having a good time with good people and making great memories." The song was described by Taste of Country as " a mid-tempo groove and a beach-y lyric that's perfect for summer." It features steel drums and a horn section, with a reggae-style beat and a lyric about celebrating and making memories with friends

== Music video ==
Released in May 2017, the song's music video was filmed in Grand Cayman, Colin Cooper and Austin Bever directed the video.

== Chart performance ==
=== Weekly charts ===
Chart (2017)	Peak position
US Country Airplay (Billboard)	32
US Hot Country Songs (Billboard)	39

=== Year-end charts ===
Chart (2017)	Position
US Hot Country Songs (Billboard)	100
