= Smoke Rings in the Dark =

Studio album by Gary Allan
- Released: October 26, 1999
- Recorded: 1999
- Studio: Javelina Studios, Emerald Studios, Sound Stage Studios and House of Gain (Nashville, Tennessee); Sound Kitchen (Franklin, Tennessee)
- Genre: Country
- Length: 40:10
- Label: MCA Nashville
- Producer: Mark Wright Tony Brown Byron Hill

Gary Allan chronology
It Would Be You (1998)	Smoke Rings in the Dark (1999)	Alright Guy (2001)

Singles from Smoke Rings in the Dark
- 1. "Smoke Rings in the Dark" Released: August 9, 1999; 2. "Lovin' You Against My Will" Released: April 8, 2000; 3. "Right Where I Need to Be" Released: September 11, 2000

Professional ratings
Review scores
Source	Rating
Allmusic	4/5 stars
Entertainment Weekly	A−

Smoke Rings in the Dark is the third studio album by American country music singer Gary Allan. It was released on October 26, 1999, as his first album for MCA Records Nashville after leaving Decca Records Nashville. The album was certified platinum by the RIAA, and it produced three singles: the title track, "Lovin' You Against My Will", and "Right Where I Need to Be", which respectively reached number 12, number 34 and number 5 on the U.S. Billboard Hot Country Songs chart. "Right Where I Need to Be" was also Allan's first Top 5 country hit and his third Top 10.

"Don't Tell Mama" was previously recorded by Ty Herndon on his 1996 album Living in a Moment, and later by Doug Stone on his 2007 album My Turn, and by Frankie Ballard on his 2014 album Sunshine & Whiskey under the title "Don't Tell Mama I Was Drinking". In addition, "Runaway" is a cover of a Del Shannon song. Allan's rendition also charted at number 74 on the country charts in 2000 based on unsolicited airplay.

A deluxe edition was released on October 25, 2019, one day before the album's 20th anniversary on vinyl, marking Allan's first release to be released on vinyl.

== Track listing ==
Smoke Rings in the Dark track listing
No.	Title	Writer(s)	Length
1.	"Smoke Rings in the Dark"	Rivers Rutherford, Houston Robert	4:18
2.	"Right Where I Need to Be"	Casey Beathard, Kendell Marvel	3:02
3.	"Don't Tell Mama"	Buddy Brock, Kim Williams, Jerry Laseter	3:56
4.	"Lovin' You Against My Will"	Jamie O'Hara	3:59
5.	"Sorry"	Shawn Camp, Brice Long, Wynn Varble	3:06
6.	"Cryin' for Nothin'"	Kevin Welch	4:17
7.	"Bourbon Borderline"	John Wiggins, Harley Allen, Jennifer Bibeau	2:47
8.	"Runaway"	Del Shannon, Max Crook	2:45
9.	"Learning to Live with Me"	Gary Burr, Allen	2:35
10.	"Cowboy Blues"	George McCorkle, Mike Geiger, Mike Huffman	2:57
11.	"I'm the One"	Gary Allan, Odie Blackmon, O'Hara	3:17
12.	"Greenfields"	Camp, Frank Dycus	3:11
Total length:			40:10

20th Anniversary Edition
No.	Title	Writer(s)	Length
13.	"Long Year"	Todd Snider	3:39
Total length:			43:49

== Charts ==
=== Weekly charts ===
Chart (1999–2000)	Peak position
Australian Albums (ARIA Charts)	45
Canadian Country Albums (RPM)	13
US Billboard 200	84
US Top Country Albums (Billboard)	9

=== Year-end charts ===
Chart (2000)	Position
US Top Country Albums (Billboard)	25
Chart (2001)	Position
Canadian Country Albums (Nielsen SoundScan)	54
US Top Country Albums (Billboard)	23

== Certifications ==
Region	Certification
United States (RIAA)	Platinum

== Personnel ==
- Gary Allan – lead vocals
- Steve Nathan – acoustic piano, keyboards
- Dan Dugmore – acoustic guitar, steel guitar
- Steve Gibson – electric guitar
- Jake Kelly – acoustic guitar, electric guitar
- Brent Rowan – electric guitar
- John Willis – acoustic guitar
- Michael Rhodes – bass
- Chad Cromwell – drums
- Hank Singer – fiddle
- The Nashville String Machine – strings
- David Campbell – string arrangements and conductor
- Lisa Cochran – backing vocals
- Christy Cornelius – backing vocals
- Randy Hardison – backing vocals
- Brice Long – backing vocals
- Marilyn Martin – backing vocals
- John Wesley Ryles – backing vocals
- Lisa Silver – backing vocals
- Harry Stinson – backing vocals
- Wynn Varble – backing vocals
- Bergen White – backing vocals
- Curtis Young – backing vocals

=== Production ===
- Tony Brown – producer
- Mark Wright – producer
- Byron Hill – associate producer
- Greg Droman – recording, overdub recording, mixing
- Robert Charles – second engineer, overdub assistant, BGV recording (4–12)
- Steve Crowder – assistant second engineer
- Todd Gunnerson – assistant second engineer
- Jody Yesville – assistant second engineer
- David Beller – overdub assistant, BGV recording assistant (4–12)
- Tony Green – overdub assistant
- Hank Williams – mastering at MasterMix (Nashville, Tennessee)
- Jessie Noble – project coordinator
- Virginia Team – art direction
- Craig Allen – design
- Tony Baker – photography
- Suzy Kipp – styling
- Marlene Zwart – grooming
- John Lytle for Lytle Management Group – management
