= Right Where I Need to Be =

Single by Gary Allan

from the album Smoke Rings in the Dark
- B-side: "Don't Tell Mama"
- Released: September 11, 2000
- Recorded: 1999
- Genre: Country rock
- Length: 3:02
- Label: MCA Nashville 172180
- Songwriters: Casey Beathard; Kendell Marvel
- Producers: Mark Wright; Tony Brown; Byron Hill

Gary Allan singles chronology
"Lovin' You Against My Will" (2000)	"Right Where I Need to Be" (2000)	"Man of Me" (2001)

"Right Where I Need to Be" is a song written by Casey Beathard and Kendell Marvel and recorded by American country music artist Gary Allan. It was released in September 2000 as the third and last single from Allan's 1999 album Smoke Rings in the Dark. The song reached number 5 on the U.S. Billboard Hot Country Tracks and Singles chart in June 2001, thus becoming his first Top 5 hit and his third Top 10.

== Content ==
In this song, the narrator is a promotion-bound executive who is climbing the corporate ladder at the expense of his private life. His boss says he will get a promotion if he flies to New Orleans on business. The executive decides to leave his first-class seat empty in favor of staying with his significant other. He states that being with his lover is "right where [he] need[s] to be."

== Music video ==
The music video was directed by Chris Rogers. The video was shot on a deserted runway at Nashville International Airport in 98 degree heat. It shows Allan and a full band performing the song on a mobile stage on the airport tarmac, while several women slowly show up behind a chain-link fence watching the performance and singing along. When the second chorus hits, the women (and some men as well) break down the fence and start running towards the stage, and disappear as they approach. It ends with a shot of a plane taking off.

== Chart performance ==
Before its release as a single, "Right Where I Need to Be" was the B-side to the album's title track, and charted from unsolicited airplay while "Lovin' You Against My Will" was still climbing the charts.

"Right Where I Need to Be" spent 48 weeks on the country charts, giving it the longest chart run of the 2000s decade. However, Billboard initially credited the song with fewer weeks on the charts because of a change starting with the chart dated January 13, 2001. Starting that week, Hot Country Singles shrank from 75 to 60 positions, and as a result, each song on the chart that week had its total number of weeks spent on the chart at the time re-calculated to count only weeks spent at No. 60 or higher, reducing the total number of weeks that "Right Where I Need to Be" had spent from 23 to 16. Billboard would later credit the single with 48 weeks spent total on the chart, with its total weeks counted before the January 13, 2001 change.

Chart (2000–2001)	Peak position
Canada Country Singles (RPM)	62 (Note: "Right Where I Need To Be" had not yet peaked when RPM ceased publication in November 2000.)
US Hot Country Songs (Billboard)	5
US Billboard Hot 100	42

=== Year-end charts ===
Chart (2001)	Position
US Country Songs (Billboard)	28

== Certifications ==
Region	Certification	Certified units/sales
United States (RIAA)	Platinum	1,000,000^{‡}
^{‡} Sales+streaming figures based on certification alone.
