= What We Ain't Got =

Single by Jake Owen

from the album Days of Gold
- Released: August 11, 2014
- Genre: Country
- Length: 3:39
- Label: RCA Nashville
- Songwriters: Travis Meadows; Travis Jerome Goff
- Producer: Joey Moi

Jake Owen singles chronology
"Beachin'" (2014)	"What We Ain't Got" (2014)	"Real Life" (2015)

"What We Ain't Got" is a song recorded by American country music artist Jake Owen. It was released in August 2014 as the third and final single from his fourth studio album Days of Gold. The song, written by Travis Meadows and Travis Jerome Goff, has Owen yearning for a former love, thinking of others wanting what's out of their reach. It garnered positive reviews from critics praising the lyrical work and Owen's vocal delivery of them.

"What We Ain't Got" peaked at numbers 14 and 19 on both the Billboard Country Airplay and Hot Country Songs charts respectively. It also reached number 89 on the Hot 100 chart, and has sold 369,000 copies in the United States as of May 2015. The song received similar chart success in Canada, reaching the top 40 of the Canada Country chart at number 30 and number 90 on the Canadian Hot 100 chart. A music video directed by Mason Dixon was created for the single.

== Content ==
"What We Ain't Got" is a ballad accompanied mainly by piano, with backing vocals by Sarah Buxton. In it, Owen sings about wanting back a loved one who has left him, and reflecting on those who want what they cannot obtain. It is performed in the Key of A Major. It is in alternating bars of 3/4 and 4/4 time signatures, with a main chord pattern of A–D–A–D–E–D–E–F♯m–A/E–D–E^{sus4}–A. The song's approximate tempo is 63 beats per minute, and it has a vocal range of F♯_{3}–E_{5}.

Owen told Taste of Country said that he knew the song would be a "risk" to release as a single, as he usually releases up-tempo songs about partying and "fought" to release a song with a stronger subject matter. He told the publication that "I'm at a point in my life where it's important to me to release songs like this that I've always believed in".

== Reception ==
=== Critical ===
Kevin John Coyne of Country Universe gave the song a B+, saying that "Though the song starts a bit too slowly, it develops into a fully realized performance that's as good as anything I've heard this year from a radio artist." Markos Papadatos of Digital Journal rated it 4.5 out of 5 stars, praising the lyrics and Owen's "rich yet haunting baritone vocals." He also thought that the song contrasted with party-themed songs on the corresponding album and displayed Owen's musical versatility. In 2017, Billboard contributor Chuck Dauphin put "What We Ain't Got" at number four on his top 10 list of Owen's best songs.

=== Commercial ===
"What We Ain't Got" entered the Hot Country Songs chart at number 40 on December 14, 2013 on the release of the album, Days of Gold. It entered the Country Airplay chart on August 9, 2014, and peaked at number 14 in early 2015, and at number 19 on the Hot Country Songs chart. The song has sold 369,000 copies in the US as of May 2015.

== Music video ==
The music video was directed by Mason Dixon and premiered in November 2014.

== Chart performance ==
Chart (2014–2015)	Peak position
Canada Hot 100 (Billboard)	90
Canada Country (Billboard)	30
US Billboard Hot 100	89
US Country Airplay (Billboard)	14
US Hot Country Songs (Billboard)	19

=== Year-end charts ===
Chart (2015)	Position
US Country Airplay (Billboard)	68
US Hot Country Songs (Billboard)	71
