= Something About a Woman =

Single by Jake Owen

from the album Startin' with Me
- Released: August 13, 2007
- Genre: Country
- Length: 3:13
- Label: RCA Nashville
- Songwriters: Jake Owen; Bob Regan; Jimmy Ritchey
- Producer: Jimmy Ritchey

Jake Owen singles chronology
"Startin' with Me" (2006)	"Something About a Woman" (2007)	"Don't Think I Can't Love You" (2008)

"Something About a Woman" is a song co-written and recorded by American country music artist Jake Owen. It was released in August 2007 as the third and final single from his debut album Startin' with Me. Owen wrote this song with Bob Regan and Jimmy Ritchey.

== Content ==
The song describes a narrator who is in love with a woman, and because of this, he states how there is nothing else in the world like the love of a woman.

== Critical reception ==
Brady Vercher of Engine 145 gave the song a "thumbs down" review. Vercher stated that "eighty percent of the song is hook without much of a supporting story and even then, the opening verse completely fails to support the hook in any sort of meaningful way and makes the sentimental tone of the song feel awkward." In 2017, Billboard contributor Chuck Dauphin put "Something About a Woman" at number seven on his top 10 list of Owen's best songs.

== Chart performance ==
Chart (2007–2008)	Peak position
US Hot Country Songs (Billboard)	15
US Bubbling Under Hot 100 (Billboard)	4
