= Barefoot Blue Jean Night =

Studio album by Jake Owen
- Released: August 30, 2011
- Genre: Country
- Length: 38:20
- Label: RCA Nashville
- Producers: Joey Moi; Rodney Clawson; Tony Brown

Jake Owen chronology
Easy Does It (2009)	Barefoot Blue Jean Night (2011)	Days of Gold (2013)

Singles from Barefoot Blue Jean Night
- 1. "Barefoot Blue Jean Night" Released: April 18, 2011; 2. "Alone with You" Released: October 17, 2011; 3. "The One That Got Away" Released: May 21, 2012; 4. "Anywhere with You" Released: February 11, 2013

Barefoot Blue Jean Night is the third studio album by American country music artist Jake Owen. It was released on August 30, 2011, via RCA Records Nashville. The album's first single, "Barefoot Blue Jean Night," is the fastest-rising single of Owen's career, as well as his first Number One hit.

== Critical reception ==
Professional ratings
Review scores
Source	Rating
AllMusic	2.5/5 stars
Roughstock	4.5/5 stars

Giving it two-and-a-half stars out of five, AllMusic's Stephen Thomas Erlewine wrote that Owen "is a likable enough presence but he can't sell the cold calculations of these transparent good times". Michael Sudhalter of Country Standard Time gave the album a positive review. He thought that the album had "plenty of versatility" and that its title track is "just right for the summer time". Similarly, Bobby Peacock of Roughstock thought that the album's songs had several overlapping themes and that Owen "has truly put out an album that he should be proud of", giving it four-and-a-half stars out of five. In 2017, Billboard contributor Chuck Dauphin placed three tracks from the album on his top 10 list of Owen's best songs: "Alone with You" at number one, the title track at number two and "Anywhere with You" at number ten.

== Track listing ==
No.	Title	Writer(s)	Length
1.	"Anywhere with You"	Ben Hayslip; David Lee Murphy; Jimmy Yeary	3:29
2.	"Keepin' It Country"	Rodney Clawson; Chris Tompkins	3:19
3.	"Wide Awake"	Brett Eldredge; Murphy; Rivers Rutherford	3:01
4.	"Barefoot Blue Jean Night"	Eric Paslay; Dylan Altman; Terry Sawchuk	2:47
5.	"Heaven"	Chris DuBois; Ashley Gorley; Matt Jenkins	3:11
6.	"Apple Pie Moonshine"	Clawson; Tompkins; Chad Kroeger; Craig Wiseman	3:17
7.	"The Journey of Your Life"	Ronnie Bowman; Troy Jones	3:48
8.	"Alone with You"	Catt Gravitt; J. T. Harding; Shane McAnally	3:31
9.	"Settin' the World on Fire"	Derek George; Chuck Jones; Kip Moore	3:47
10.	"Nobody Feelin' No Pain"	Brett James; Murphy	4:56
11.	"The One That Got Away"	Dallas Davidson; Jake Owen; Jimmy Ritchey	3:14
Total length:			38:20

Tracks 1, 2, 4, 6, 8, and 11 produced by Joey Moi and Rodney Clawson; tracks 3, 5, 7, 9, 10 produced by Tony Brown.

== Personnel ==
- Tom Bukovac - acoustic guitar, electric guitar
- Sarah Buxton - background vocals
- Perry Coleman - background vocals
- Chad Cromwell - drums, percussion
- Glen Duncan - banjo, dobro
- Kyle Everson - programming
- Shannon Forrest - drums
- Kenny Greenberg - acoustic guitar, electric guitar
- Wes Hightower - background vocals
- John Barlow Jarvis - Hammond B-3 organ, keyboards, piano, Wurlitzer
- Charlie Judge - Hammond B-3 organ, piano, synthesizer
- Brent Mason - electric guitar
- Jerry McPherson - electric guitar
- Joey Moi - programming
- Steve Nathan - Hammond B-3 organ, piano
- Jake Owen - acoustic guitar, lead vocals
- Michael Rhodes - bass guitar
- Adam Shoenfeld - electric guitar
- Jimmie Lee Sloas - bass guitar
- Chris Tompkins - programming
- Ilya Toshinsky - banjo, dobro, acoustic guitar

== Charts ==
=== Weekly charts ===
Chart (2011)	Peak position
US Billboard 200	6
US Top Country Albums (Billboard)	1

=== Year-end charts ===
Chart (2011)	Position
US Top Country Albums (Billboard)	45
Chart (2012)	Position
US Billboard 200	146
US Top Country Albums (Billboard)	29
Chart (2013)	Position
US Top Country Albums (Billboard)	46

== Certifications ==
Region	Certification
United States (RIAA)	Platinum
