= Tell Me (Jake Owen song) =

Single by Jake Owen

from the album Easy Does It
- Released: April 12, 2010
- Genre: Country
- Length: 4:38
- Label: RCA Nashville
- Songwriters: Jake Owen; Jimmy Ritchey; Don Poythress
- Producer: Jimmy Ritchey

Jake Owen singles chronology
"Eight Second Ride" (2009)	"Tell Me" (2010)	"Barefoot Blue Jean Night" (2011)

"Tell Me" is a song co-written and recorded by American country music singer Jake Owen. It was released in April 2010 as the third and final single from his album Easy Does It. Owen wrote this song with Jimmy Ritchey and Don Poythress.

== Critical reception ==
Matt Bjorke of Roughstock gave the song a positive review, praising the "introspective lyric". He also thought that the song was "miles away from the goofy come-on that was 'Eight Second Ride'."

== Music video ==
The music video was directed by Mason Dixon and premiered in mid-2010.

== Chart performance ==
Chart (2010)	Peak position
US Hot Country Songs (Billboard)	35
