= American Country Love Song =

Single by Jake Owen

from the album American Love
- Released: March 4, 2016
- Recorded: 2016
- Genre: Country
- Length: 3:18
- Label: RCA Nashville
- Songwriters: Ross Copperman; Jaren Johnston; Ashley Gorley
- Producers: Ross Copperman; Shane McAnally

Jake Owen singles chronology
"Real Life" (2015)	"American Country Love Song" (2016)	"If He Ain't Gonna Love You" (2016)

"American Country Love Song" is a song recorded by American country music artist Jake Owen. It is the first single from his fifth studio album for RCA Nashville, American Love. The song was written by Ross Copperman, Jaren Johnston and Ashley Gorley, with the former producing it with Shane McAnally. The track acts as a celebration for the various kinds of love being made in America.

"American Country Love Song" gave Owen his sixth number-one hit on the Billboard Country Airplay chart. It also reached numbers six and 55 on both the Hot Country Songs and Hot 100 charts respectively. The single was certified Gold by the Recording Industry Association of America (RIAA), and has sold 351,000 units in the United States as of September 2016. It achieved similar chart success in Canada, peaking at number two on the Country chart and number 88 on the Canadian Hot 100. It garnered a Platinum certification from Music Canada, denoting sales of 80,000 units in that country.

The accompanying music video for the song was directed by Jeff Venable and features Owen taking a road trip on the southern United States highways.

== Content ==
The song is a list that "celebrates quintessential ideas of love". In the verses, Owen "speak-sings" in a manner that The Boot compared to Shawn Mullins' "Lullaby", while the "anthemic chorus" features steel guitar and a "drum-heavy arrangement".

Owen told Nash Country Weekly magazine that "“I think my fans have come to expect a certain kind of music from me; songs that are fun, energetic and just make you feel good. ‘American Country Love Song’ has the feeling of freedom and being young and adventurous...The single is a broad-spectrum glance in a three-minute song that describes a couple of kids living that American country love song...[b]ut, it's also a much larger celebration of the love story that is America itself, from cowboys and cowgirls to cheerleaders and quarterbacks in small towns and big cities."

== Reception ==
=== Critical reception ===
An uncredited review from Taste of Country was favorable, saying that Owen's "storytelling has become more nuanced" while praising the production and lyrics.

=== Commercial ===
"American Country Love Song" debuted at number 33 on the Billboard Country Airplay chart dated March 19, 2016, and debuted at number 18 on the Hot Country Songs chart the following week. It reached number six on the Hot Country Songs chart the week of August 20, staying on the chart for 27 weeks. It also peaked at number one on the Country Airplay chart the week of September 17, giving Owen his sixth number-one hit on that chart. On the Hot 100, the song debuted at number 83 the week of March 26, before leaving the next week. It reappeared on the week of June 18 at number 89, and peaked at number 55 the week of September 17, remaining on the chart for seventeen weeks. The song was certified gold by the RIAA on August 6, 2016 and has sold 351,000 copies in the United States as of September 2016.

In Canada, the track debuted at number 48 on the Canada Country chart dated April 9, 2016, peaked at number two the week of September 17, and stayed on the chart for 27 weeks. It also debuted at number 99 on the Canadian Hot 100 chart dated July 30, but left the next week. It made a reappearance on the week of August 13 at number 90 and reached number 88 the week after, staying on the chart for eight weeks. The track received a platinum certification from Music Canada on September 19, 2017.

== Music video ==
The music video was directed by Jeff Venable and premiered in April 2016. The video shows Owen driving the southern United States highways in a 1960s light green Volkswagen Microbus, meeting with fans along the way and making pit stops that involve fireworks, eateries and attractions in states like Chattanooga and Owen's hometown of Vero Beach, Florida.

== Live performances ==
On August 1, 2016, Owen first performed the song live on ABC's Good Morning America. He performed it again on Jimmy Kimmel Live! on September 21.

== Charts and certifications ==
=== Charts ===
Chart (2016)	Peak position
Canada (Canadian Hot 100)	88
Canada Country (Billboard)	2
US Billboard Hot 100	55
US Country Airplay (Billboard)	1
US Hot Country Songs (Billboard)	6

=== Year end charts ===
Chart (2016)	Position
US Country Airplay (Billboard)	6
US Hot Country Songs (Billboard)	22

=== Certifications ===
Region	Certification	Certified units/sales
Canada (Music Canada)	Platinum	80,000^{‡}
United States (RIAA)	Gold	351,000
^{‡} Sales+streaming figures based on certification alone.

== See also ==
- List of number-one country singles of 2016 (U.S.)
