= Kendell Marvel =

American singer-songwriter

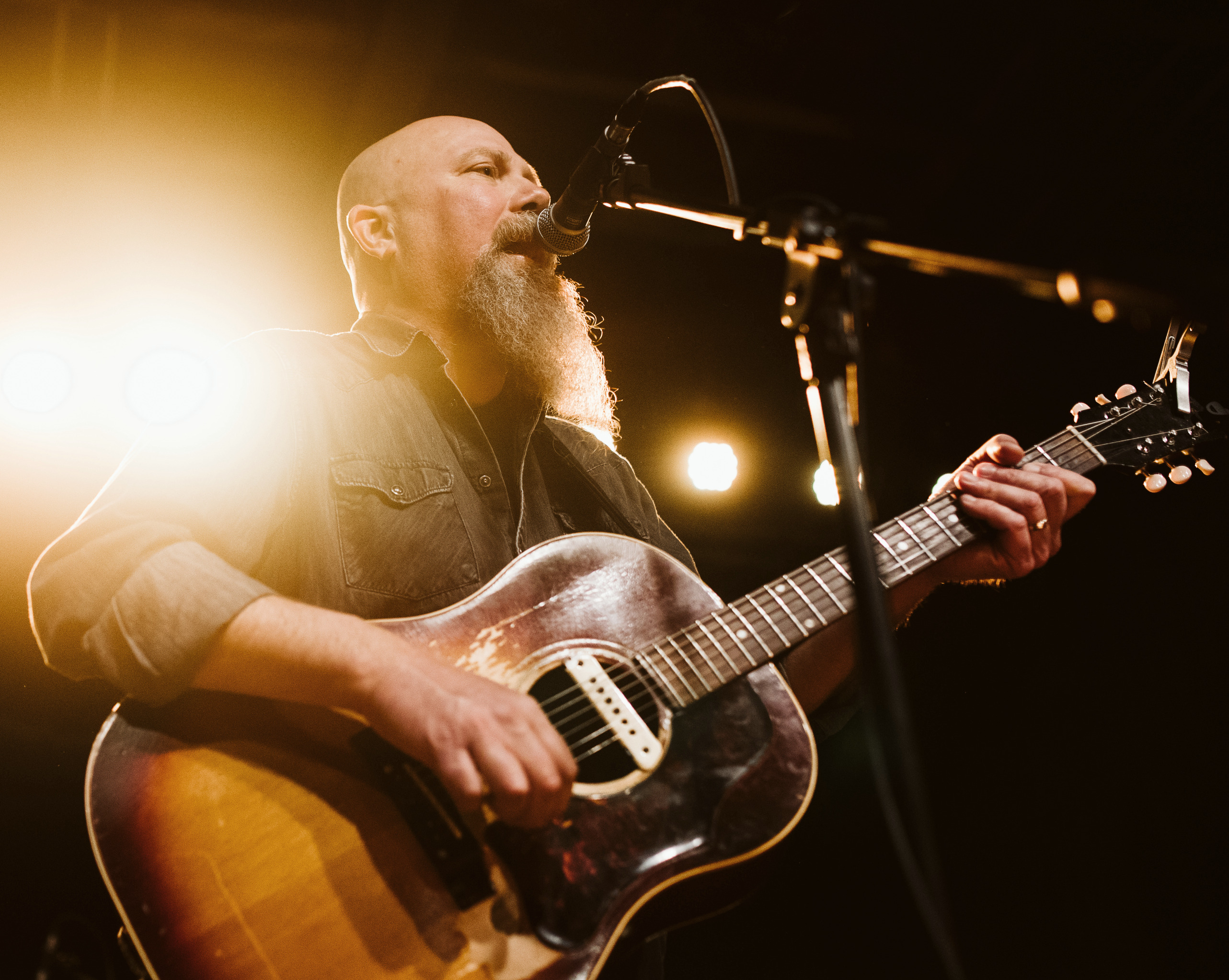
- Kendell Marvel performing live at the Exit-In December 2018

Background information
- Origin: Nashville, Tennessee
- Genres: Country, Outlaw Country, Country rock
- Occupations: Singer, songwriter
- Years active: 1998–present
- Labels: Big Daddy, Easy Eye Sound
- Website: kendellmarvel.com

Kendell Marvel is an American country music singer and songwriter. He released his debut solo album, Lowdown & Lonesome in October 2017.

== Early life ==
Kendell Marvel was born and raised in Southern Illinois. He quickly discovered his talent as a musician when his father would take him to play Honky Tonks starting at 10 years old. He grew up between Galatia and Thompsonville, Illinois, and spent much of his youth traveling around the area playing shows. Marvel decided to relocate to Cheatham County, Tennessee in 1998, to pursue his career as a songwriter in Nashville, Tennessee.

== Career ==
On his first day in Nashville, Kendell wrote the song "Right Where I Need to Be" which was cut by Gary Allan and peaked at number 5 on Billboard's country music chart. This initial success really boosted Kendell's career as a writer and allowed him to work with a wide array of acts including, Jake Owen, George Strait and many more. As his career progressed he returned to his roots, feeling that a traditional sound was a more natural fit for his writing and own music style. In 2008 he wrote the title track for Jamey Johnson's Grammy nominated album, That Lonesome Song, which yielded the same name as the song. Kendell has also written over 60 songs with country star, Chris Stapleton including his grammy winning track, "Either Way". In 2017 Marvel started a residency at Nashville's Exit/In, performing monthly shows tagged as "Kendell Marvel's Honky Tonk Experience" playing original songs, and classic country hits, with a different set of special guests each month. Some of the guests that have joined him on this stage include, Cody Jinks, Brothers Osborne, Alison Krauss, Jamey Johnson, Chris Shiflett of the Foo Fighters, Randy Houser, Ashley McBryde and many more.

In 2017, Marvel released his first solo album Lowdown and Lonesome, a 10-track concept album that tells stories of heartbreak and vice, produced by Keith Gattis, featuring songs co-written by acts such as Chris Stapleton and Randy Houser.

Marvel's second studio album, Solid Gold Sounds, co-produced by Dan Auerbach and David R. Ferguson, came out on October 11 of 2019.

== Discography ==
Studio albums

- Lowdown and Lonesome (Big Daddy, 2017)
- Solid Gold Sounds (Easy Eye Sound, 2019)
- Come On Sunshine (self released, 2022)

== Songwriting credits ==
Songs written by Marvel, with original artists, co-writers and originating album, showing year released
Title	Artist(s)	Co-writer(s)	Originating album	Year	US Hot 100	US Hot Country	Ref.
"Right Where I Need to Be"	Gary Allan	Casey Beathard	Smoke Rings in the Dark	2000	42	5	
"Don't Think I Can't Love You"	Jake Owen	Owen, Jimmy Ritchey	Easy Does It	2008	57	2	
"Twang"	George Strait	Jim Lauderdale, Jimmy Ritchey	Twang	2009	100	14	
"Comin' Around"	Josh Thompson	Thompson, Rodney Clawson	N/A	2011	–	31	
"Either Way"	Chris Stapleton	Stapleton, Tim James	From A Room: Volume 1	2017	89	17	
