= Don't Think I Can't Love You =

Single by Jake Owen

from the album Easy Does It
- Released: August 25, 2008
- Genre: Country
- Length: 3:05
- Label: RCA Nashville
- Songwriters: Jake Owen; Kendell Marvel; Jimmy Ritchey
- Producer: Jimmy Ritchey

Jake Owen singles chronology
"Something About a Woman" (2007)	"Don't Think I Can't Love You" (2008)	"Eight Second Ride" (2009)

Music video
- "Don't Think I Can't Love You" at CMT.com

"Don't Think I Can't Love You" is a song co-written and recorded by American country music artist Jake Owen. It was released in August 2008 as the fourth single release of his career, and the lead single from his album Easy Does It. Owen wrote the song with Kendell Marvel and Jimmy Ritchey.

== Content ==
"Don't Think I Can't Love You" was co-written by Jake Owen, along with his producer Jimmy Ritchey and Kendal Marvel. The song is a mid-tempo in triple meter, accompanied by electric guitar. In it, the male narrator explains that, although he does not have much money, he is still able to show love for the woman he is addressing.

== Critical reception ==
Allen Jacobs of Roughstock, a country music review site, gave the song a favorable review. Although he said the lyrics "have been said a bunch of times before", he said that the song had a "bluesy musical vibe". He also compared Owen's "strong, baritone voice" to Alan Jackson and said, "Owen sings the words passionately and has delivered a solid contemporary country single." Kevin J. Coyne of Country Universe gave the song a B− rating, calling the song "pleasant to the ears" but added, "the record doesn't build to a satisfying conclusion." In 2017, Billboard contributor Chuck Dauphin put "Don't Think I Can't Love You" at number nine on his top 10 list of Owen's best songs.

== Music video ==
A music video, directed by David McClister, was released for the song on November 6, 2008. In the video, Owen is shown performing in a courtyard with his band, as couples are shown dancing in their apartments and watching Owen's performance.

== Chart performance ==
"Don't Think I Can't Love You" peaked at number 2 on the US Billboard Hot Country Songs chart in March 2009. Behind both "River of Love" by George Strait and "Here Comes Goodbye" by Rascal Flatts. This song was Owen's second to reach the top 10.

== Charts ==
=== Weekly charts ===
Chart (2008–2009)	Peak position
US Hot Country Songs (Billboard)	2
US Billboard Hot 100	57

=== Year-end charts ===
Chart (2009)	Position
US Country Songs (Billboard)	26
