= Eight Second Ride =

Single by Jake Owen

from the album Easy Does It
- Released: June 15, 2009
- Recorded: 2006
- Genre: Country rock
- Length: 3:07
- Label: RCA Nashville
- Songwriters: Jake Owen; Eric Durrance
- Producer: Jimmy Ritchey

Jake Owen singles chronology
"Don't Think I Can't Love You" (2008)	"Eight Second Ride" (2009)	"Tell Me" (2010)

"Eight Second Ride" is a song co-written and recorded by American country music singer Jake Owen. It was released in June 2009 as the fifth single of Owen's career, and the second single from his second album, Easy Does It (2009). Owen had previously recorded the song on his 2006 debut album, Startin' with Me. Co-written with Eric Durrance, the song is about a man having sex with a woman from a bar in his pickup truck.

The song received mixed reviews from critics who questioned the production and lyrical content. "Eight Second Ride" peaked at number 11 on the Billboard Hot Country Songs chart and number 70 on the Hot 100 chart. The song was certified Gold by the Recording Industry Association of America (RIAA), denoting sales of over half-a-million units in that country.

== Content ==
"Eight Second Ride" is an up-tempo in which the male narrator meets a female in a bar, then takes her out to his pickup truck. The title is a reference to the eight-second time limit in bull riding, which is used as a metaphor for sex.

Owen had previously recorded the song on his 2006 debut album Startin' with Me, and re-recorded it for his second album, 2009's Easy Does It.

== Critical reception ==
The song was met with mixed reviews from music critics. Kevin J. Coyne of Country Universe gave it a B+, saying that the song was a "work of fantasy" but that Owen's vocal performance made the song "enjoyable." Jim Malec of The 9513 gave a thumbs-down, saying that the intro "bursts out of the gate" but calling the song's storyline "comically unrealistic." He also considered the title disconnected from the premise, because the rest of the song did not pertain to bull riding, and added that he considered it one of the worst single releases of the year. Michael Sudhalter of Country Standard Time also described the song negatively in his review of the album and questioned the decision to re-record it: "One wonders why a song with such an unmemorable melody and cheesy double entendres made it on to one album, let alone two." In 2017, Billboard contributor Chuck Dauphin put "Eight Second Ride" at number six on his top 10 list of Owen's songs.

== Music video ==
Deaton-Flanigen Productions directed and produced the song's music video, which debuted on the television channel CMT (Country Music Television) in August 2009. The video stars Owen's future wife, model Lacey Buchanan from Winter Park, Florida.

== Chart performance ==
On the week ending November 21, 2009, "Eight Second Ride" debuted on the Billboard Hot 100 at number 95. The following week, it moved up to number 82 and reached number 70 in its fifth week on the chart, staying there for thirteen weeks.

Chart (2009–2010)	Peak position
US Hot Country Songs (Billboard)	11
US Billboard Hot 100	70
