= American Love =

Studio album by Jake Owen
- Released: July 29, 2016
- Genre: Country
- Length: 37:58
- Label: RCA Nashville
- Producers: Lukas Bracewell; Ross Copperman; Luke Laird; Shane McAnally; Jake Owen

Jake Owen chronology
Days of Gold (2013)	American Love (2016)	Greatest Hits (2017)

Singles from American Love
- 1. "American Country Love Song" Released: March 4, 2016; 2. "If He Ain't Gonna Love You" Released: October 17, 2016; 3. "Good Company" Released: April 17, 2017

American Love is the fifth studio album by American country music artist Jake Owen. It was released on July 29, 2016, through RCA Nashville. It includes the #1 single "American Country Love Song".

== Reception ==
Professional ratings
Review scores
Source	Rating
AllMusic	3.5/5 stars
Renowned for Sound	3/5 stars

AllMusic's Stephen Thomas Erlewine rated the album 3.5 out of 5 stars, noting the "bittersweet streak" in some of the song's themes, as well as Owen "modulating his delivery, choosing to lie back instead of lean into the songs, a tactic that gives the lighter moments a melancholy pull and the ballads a bit of grace." Daniel Patrin of Renowned for Sound rated the record 3 out of 5 stars, noting that it reverts to Owen's "deeper, ancestral country roots" and away from Days of Gold's "contemporary concoction of electronic pop-country mixtures", concluding that "American Love is the resulted work of a beholden musician, content and satisfied – rolling through songwriting without a shroud of guilt and a wealth of glittering pride."

== Commercial performance ==
The album's lead single "American Country Love Song" topped the Billboard Country Airplay chart on September 17, 2016. The second single "If He Ain't Gonna Love You" stalled on the charts at its peak of #37 for several weeks, and became Owen's lowest charting single of his career. American Love debuted at number 4 on the Billboard 200 with 35,000 units, Owen highest charting album on that chart. It also debuted at number one on the Top Country Albums chart, selling 29,400 albums in its first week. The album has sold 53,800 copies in the United States as of November 2016. The album's third single, "Good Company" released to country radio on April 17, 2017.

== Track listing ==
No.	Title	Writer(s)	Producer(s)	Length
1.	"American Love"	Jaren Johnston; Luke Laird	Shane McAnally; Ross Copperman	3:15
2.	"After Midnight"	Rodney Clawson; Matt Dragstrem; McAnally	McAnally; Copperman	3:57
3.	"Where I Am"	Copperman; Hillary Lindsey; McAnally	McAnally; Copperman	3:44
4.	"Everybody Dies Young"	Copperman; McAnally; Josh Osborne; Scott Stepakoff	McAnally; Copperman	3:08
5.	"VW Van"	Paul Reter; Brent Stenzel	Lukas Bracewell; Owen	2:55
6.	"Good Company"	Matt Alderman; Tommy Cecil; Jared Mullins	Bracewell; Owen	2:54
7.	"LAX"	Nathan Chapman; Andrew Dorff; Jake Owen	McAnally; Copperman	3:27
8.	"If He Ain't Gonna Love You"	Laird; McAnally; Chris Stapleton	McAnally; Laird; Copperman	3:36
9.	"When You Love Someone"	Blair Daly; Lindsey; Sean McConnell	Bracewell; Owen	3:57
10.	"You Ain't Going Nowhere"	Copperman; Dallas Davidson; Ashley Gorley	McAnally; Copperman	3:38
11.	"American Country Love Song"	Copperman; Gorley; Johnston	McAnally; Copperman	3:18

== Personnel ==
Credits for American Love adapted from AllMusic.

Vocals

- Stephanie Chapman – background vocals
- Ross Copperman – background vocals
- Jaren Johnston – background vocals
- Hillary Lindsey – background vocals
- Shane McAnally – background vocals
- Erin McCarley – background vocals
- Josh Osborne – background vocals
- Jake Owen – lead vocals, background vocals
- Chris Stapleton – background vocals

Instruments

- Joseph Arick – Hammond B-3 organ, harmonica, keyboards, piano
- Lukas Bracewell – banjo, acoustic guitar, electric guitar, nylon string guitar, ukulele
- Ross Copperman – bass guitar, acoustic guitar, electric guitar, keyboards
- Dan Dugmore – pedal steel guitar
- Fred Eltringham – drums, drum loops, percussion
- Robby Emerson – bass guitar
- Ryan Gore – clapping, tambourine
- Lee Hendricks – bass guitar
- Myron Howell – drums, percussion
- Scotty Huff – trumpet
- Luke Laird – acoustic guitar, electric guitar
- Tony Lucido – bass guitar
- Rob McNelley – electric guitar
- Josh Osborne – acoustic guitar
- Jake Owen – clapping
- Russ Pahl – pedal steel guitar
- Jovan Quallo – saxophone
- Danny Rader – acoustic guitar, electric guitar, Hammond B-3 organ, synthesizer, tres, Wurlitzer
- Josh Scalf – trombone
- Matt Stanfield – Hammond B-3 organ, keyboards, piano
- Aaron Sterling – drums, percussion
- David Wallace – electric guitar
- Derek Wells – acoustic guitar, electric guitar
- Nir Z – drums, percussion

Production

- Joseph Arick – programming
- Daniel Bacigalupi – mixing
- Sean R. Badum – assistant
- Joe Baldridge – engineer
- Drew Bollman – assistant
- Lukas Bracewell – engineer, producer, programming
- Ross Copperman – digital editing, engineer, producer, programming
- Josh Ditty – assistant
- Ryan Gore – engineer
- Kelsey Granda – production assistant
- Luke Laird – producer, programming
- Jasper Lemaster – assistant
- Joseph Llanes – photographer
- Kam Lutcherhand – assistant
- Tony Lucido – engineer
- Shane McAnally – producer
- Andrew Mendleson – mastering
- Buckley Miller – digital editing
- Seth Morton – assistant
- Justin Niebank – digital editing, mixing
- Zack Pancoast – engineer
- Jake Owen – producer
- Andy Selby – digital editing
- Aaron Sterling – engineer
- Brian David Willis – digital editing

== Chart performance ==
=== Weekly charts ===
Chart (2016)	Peak position
Australian Albums (ARIA)	55
Canadian Albums (Billboard)	14
US Billboard 200	4
US Top Country Albums (Billboard)	1

=== Year-end charts ===
Chart (2016)	Position
US Top Country Albums (Billboard)	50
