= Alone with You (Jake Owen song) =

Single by Jake Owen

from the album Barefoot Blue Jean Night
- Released: October 17, 2011
- Recorded: 2011
- Genre: Country
- Length: 3:31
- Label: RCA Nashville
- Songwriters: Catt Gravitt; J. T. Harding; Shane McAnally
- Producers: Joey Moi; Rodney Clawson

Jake Owen singles chronology
"Barefoot Blue Jean Night" (2011)	"Alone with You" (2011)	"The One That Got Away" (2012)

"Alone with You" is a song written by Shane McAnally, Catt Gravitt and J. T. Harding, and recorded by American country music artist Jake Owen. It is the eighth single of his career, and was released in October 2011 as the second single from his album Barefoot Blue Jean Night. It achieved commercial success, becoming Owen's second number one single.

== Content ==
The song is in the key of G major with a moderate tempo, a vocal range of B3-C5 and a main chord pattern of GM7-Em7-C.

== Critical reception ==
Billy Dukes of Taste of Country gave the song three and a half stars out of five, saying that "with somewhat thin lyrical content, the song needs that genuine delivery to push it to colossal levels of greatness," adding that although "Owen doesn't own this as he has his more successful hits," he is "talented enough that his good is another singer's great." Giving it four stars out of five, Bobby Peacock of Roughstock praised the "straightforward but effective lines" and said that it was "overall a very different sound for the usually upbeat Owen, and he pulls it off. "

== Music video ==
The music video was directed by Mason Dixon and premiered in December 2011. It stars Miss USA 2009 Kristen Dalton as his love interest.

== Chart performance ==
"Alone With You" debuted at number 56 on the U.S. Billboard Hot Country Songs chart for the week of October 15, 2011. It also debuted at number 90 on the U.S. Billboard Hot 100 chart for the week of December 24, 2011. It has since become a number 1 hit.

Chart (2011–2012)	Peak position
US Hot Country Songs (Billboard)	1
US Billboard Hot 100	41
Canada Hot 100 (Billboard)	69

=== Year-end charts ===
Chart (2012)	Position
US Country Songs (Billboard)	14

== Certifications ==
Region	Certification	Certified units/sales
United States (RIAA)	Platinum	1,000,000^{‡}
^{‡} Sales+streaming figures based on certification alone.
