= Days of Gold =

Studio album by Jake Owen
- Released: December 3, 2013
- Studios: Big Loud Mountain Studios; Ocean Way Studios; The Metal Building
- Genre: Country
- Length: 40:55
- Label: RCA Nashville
- Producer: Joey Moi

Jake Owen chronology
Barefoot Blue Jean Night (2011)	Days of Gold (2013)	American Love (2016)

Singles from Days of Gold
- 1. "Days of Gold" Released: August 12, 2013; 2. "Beachin'" Released: February 3, 2014; 3. "What We Ain't Got" Released: August 11, 2014

Days of Gold is the fourth studio album by American country music artist Jake Owen. It was released on December 3, 2013 via RCA Nashville. The album's track listing was announced on October 9, 2013. It garnered a positive reception from critics. Days of Gold debuted at numbers 4 and 15 on both the Top Country Albums and Billboard 200 charts respectively and spawned three singles: the title track, "Beachin'", and "What We Ain't Got". Owen promoted the record by touring across North America with the Eli Young Band, Parmalee, Thomas Rhett, and the Cadillac Three as his opening acts.

== Promotion ==
On January 7, 2014, Owen announced a 55-city North American tour to promote the album, beginning at Brookings, South Dakota and finishing at Vero Beach, Florida. He was joined by the Eli Young Band, Parmalee, Thomas Rhett, and the Cadillac Three as opening acts on select dates of his tour.

== Critical reception ==
Professional ratings
Aggregate scores
Source	Rating
Metacritic	71/100
Review scores
Source	Rating
AllMusic	3.5/5 stars
Country Weekly	A−
Got Country Online	5/5 stars
Music Is My Oxygen Weekly	3/5 stars
Rolling Stone	3/5 stars
USA Today	3/4 stars

On review aggregator website Metacritic, Days of Gold holds a score of 71 out of 100, based on reviews from five critics, which indicates "generally favourable reviews". The album got some positive reviews from AllMusic, Country Weekly, Got Country Online and USA Today. Stephen Thomas Erlewine of AllMusic gave it a three-and-a-half out of five stars, and thought that the album had a less polished sound than its predecessor. He wrote that "There's no mistaking Days of Gold for anything earthy, but this sonic thawing winds up emphasizing Owen's inherent sweetness in an appealing fashion." At Country Weekly, Tammy Ragusa graded the album to be an A− and said that Owen's voice was "[e]ffortless and easy", and that its themes seemed like an artistic evolution from the previous album. Donna Block of Got Country Online gave it a perfect five star rating, and called this album "precious", which fans and listeners alike should own this album. At USA Today, Brian Mansfield rated it a three out of four stars, and felt that after the first three songs that the album goes south somewhat, which he noted that the hits are likely to be the "party songs"; however, he affirmed that "the others separate him from the pack."

However, the album got some mixed to unfavorable reviews from Rolling Stone, Country Standard Time and Music Is My Oxygen Weekly. At Rolling Stone, Chuck Eddy rated the release three stars out of five, and noted that the listener should "drink up" to this good album. Jeffrey B. Remz of Country Standard Time was less favorable, saying that "Owen sings well enough, although not especially distinctive on materials that is not the most exciting. Parties, relationships and drinking…are part of the mix, but frankly we've heard it all before. And that's the problem. Kenny Chesney has done these types of songs, only a lot better and with far more introspection and depth." At Music Is My Oxygen, Rob Burkhardt rated the album three out of five stars, noting the album has good material that touches on many topics which the likes of Luke Bryan, Blake Shelton and Florida Georgia Line do, and this causes it to get lost amongst the others; however, he wrote that "Days of Gold deserves to be heard, but Owen is going to have to dig a little deeper."

In 2017, Billboard contributor Chuck Dauphin placed two tracks from the album on his top 10 list of Owen's best songs: "What We Ain't Got" and "Beachin" .

== Track listing ==
No.	Title	Writer(s)	Length
1.	"Days of Gold"	Jaren Johnston; Neil Mason	3:21
2.	"Beachin'"	Johnston; Jon Nite; Jimmy Robbins	3:11
3.	"1972"	Johnston; Jim Beavers	3:26
4.	"Ghost Town"	Chris DeStefano; Ashley Gorley; Shane McAnally	3:29
5.	"Life of the Party"	Dallas Davidson; DeStefano; Gorley	3:04
6.	"Good Timing"	Davidson; Gorley; Zach Crowell	3:16
7.	"Tall Glass of Something"	Johnston; Luke Laird; Barry Dean	2:55
8.	"One Little Kiss (Never Killed Nobody)"	Gorley; Robbins; McAnally	2:59
9.	"What We Ain't Got"	Travis Meadows; Travis Jerome Goff	3:39
10.	"Tipsy"	Matt Jenkins; McAnally; Trevor Rosen	3:39
11.	"Drivin' All Night"	Casey Beathard; Monty Criswell	3:56
12.	"Sure Feels Right"	Johnston; Zac Maloy; Jeremy Stover	4:00
Total length:			40:55

Deluxe edition
No.	Title	Writer(s)	Length
13.	"After the Music's Stopped"	Tom Douglas; Johnston	4:05
14.	"I Like You a Lot"	Phillip White; Adam Wright	3:39
15.	"Summer Jam" (featuring Florida Georgia Line)	Craig Wiseman; Brian Kelley; Tyler Hubbard	3:41
16.	"Surefire Feeling"	Ryan Hurd; Matt McGinn; Steve Moakler	3:35
Total length:			55:55

== Personnel ==
Adapted from liner notes.

- Joseph Arick - harmonica
- Tom Bukovac - electric guitar
- Sarah Buxton - background vocals
- Shannon Forrest - drums
- Audley Freed - electric guitar
- Wes Hightower - background vocals
- Jaren Johnston - acoustic guitar
- Charlie Judge - Hammond B-3 organ, piano, programming
- Joey Moi - bass guitar, acoustic guitar, electric guitar, percussion, programming, synthesizer, background vocals
- Jake Owen - lead vocals
- Russ Pahl - pedal steel guitar
- Adam Shoenfeld - electric guitar
- Jimmie Lee Sloas - bass guitar
- Ilya Toshinsky - banjo, dobro, acoustic guitar, baritone guitar, electric guitar, mandolin

== Chart performance ==
Days of Gold debuted on the Billboard 200 at No. 15 and on the Top Country Albums chart at No.4, with 40,000 albums sold for the week. The album has sold 215,400 copies in the US as of February 2015.

=== Weekly charts ===
Chart (2013–14)	Peak position
Canadian Albums (Billboard)	24
US Billboard 200	15
US Top Country Albums (Billboard)	4

=== Year-end charts ===
Chart (2014)	Position
US Billboard 200	105
US Top Country Albums (Billboard)	17
