= Anywhere with You =

Single by Jake Owen

from the album Barefoot Blue Jean Night
- Released: February 11, 2013
- Recorded: 2011
- Genre: Country
- Length: 3:29 (album version); 3:16 (radio edit)
- Label: RCA Nashville
- Songwriters: Ben Hayslip; David Lee Murphy; Jimmy Yeary
- Producers: Joey Moi; Rodney Clawson

Jake Owen singles chronology
"Back" (2012)	"Anywhere with You" (2013)	"Days of Gold" (2013)

"Anywhere with You" is a song recorded by American country music artist Jake Owen. It was released in February 2013 as the fourth single from his third studio album, Barefoot Blue Jean Night. The song was written by Ben Hayslip, David Lee Murphy and Jimmy Yeary.

== Reception ==
=== Critical ===
Billy Dukes of Taste of Country gave the song two stars out of five, calling it "a song we’ve all heard a dozen times before, served with generic country seasoning." Chuck Dauphin of Roughstock gave the song a favorable review, writing that "it’s a performance that is ready to hit the airwaves. The chorus is particularly hooky!" Ben Foster of Country Universe gave the song a C− grade, saying that it "takes a concept many times used before, and does nothing with it" and "the thick, un-country, radio-chasing production similarly earns no points for originality."

=== Commercial ===
As of December 14, 2014, "Anywhere with You" has sold over 1,000,000 copies in the United States.

== Chart performance ==
"Anywhere with You" debuted at number 53 on the U.S. Billboard Country Airplay chart for the week of January 19, 2013. It also debuted at number 47 on the U.S. Billboard Hot Country Songs chart for the week of February 9, 2013. It also debuted at number 92 on the U.S. Billboard Hot 100 chart for the week of April 6, 2013. It also debuted at number 97 on the Canadian Hot 100 chart for the week of June 1, 2013.

Chart (2013)	Peak position
Canada Hot 100 (Billboard)	60
Canada Country (Billboard)	4
US Billboard Hot 100	46
US Country Airplay (Billboard)	1
US Hot Country Songs (Billboard)	7

=== Year-end charts ===
Chart (2013)	Position
US Country Airplay (Billboard)	27
US Hot Country Songs (Billboard)	30

== Certifications ==
Region	Certification	Certified units/sales
United States (RIAA)	Platinum	1,000,000^{‡}
^{‡} Sales+streaming figures based on certification alone.
