= Barefoot Blue Jean Night (song) =

Single by Jake Owen

from the album Barefoot Blue Jean Night
- Released: April 18, 2011
- Genre: Country
- Length: 2:47
- Label: RCA Nashville
- Songwriters: Eric Paslay; Dylan Altman; Terry Sawchuk
- Producers: Joey Moi; Rodney Clawson

Jake Owen singles chronology
"Tell Me" (2010)	"Barefoot Blue Jean Night" (2011)	"Alone with You" (2011)

"Barefoot Blue Jean Night" is a song written by Dylan Altman, Eric Paslay and Terry Sawchuk, and recorded by American country music artist Jake Owen. It is the seventh single of his career, and was released in April 2011 as the first single and title track from his album of the same name. It reached number one on the U.S. Billboard Hot Country Songs chart in September 2011.

== History ==
Owen told Taste of Country that he was "pretty much finished" creating the album, and was given the song about three days before it was supposed to be done. After saying that he "could not get it out of [his] head", he decided to record it after a friend told him, "You're crazy if you don't record that song." Owen also said that he identified with the song's beach-related imagery, as he grew up on a beach in Florida. Co-writer Eric Paslay told the same website that he started playing a riff on a high-strung guitar. He and the co-writers decided to make the song a summertime anthem because the first lyrics they thought of "sounded like a summertime anthem."

== Critical reception ==
Matt Bjorke of Roughstock gave the song a positive review, saying that it "giv[es] off a fun, good time vibe". He also thought that the use of banjo and drum machine recalled the work of Mark McGuinn. Michael Sudhalter, in his review of the album for Country Standard Time, said that the song "has a perfect chorus, and it's just right for the summer time." Kevin John Coyne, reviewing the song for Country Universe, gave it a C+ rating, saying that in order for the "larger-than-life arrangement to have any traction, you've got to paint your memories with at least a nugget of lyrical depth."

== Music video ==
The music video was directed by Peter Zavadil and premiered in June 2011. It was filmed at Center Hill Lake in Middle Tennessee. It features his then-girlfriend and now ex-wife, Lacey Buchanan. It features Owen and many friends, including his band, having a good time on the lake and singing. It also features him on a boat with Lacey, and water-skiing.

== Commercial performance ==
Many radio station began playing the song before its official release on April 18, 2011. The song gained enough airplay for it to enter Country Airplay at No. 55 as well as Hot Country Songs for the charts dated April 9, 2011. It debuted on the Billboard Hot 100 chart at No. 98 for the chart dated April 30, 2011 after the song release. The song peaked on the Billboard Hot 100 at No. 21 on September 17, 2011, as well as No. 1 on the Country Airplay and Hot Country Songs charts. The song was certified double platinum on May 9, 2013 by the RIAA. The song has sold 2.3 million copies in the U.S. as of September 2015.

== Chart performance ==
=== Weekly charts ===
Chart (2011)	Peak position
US Hot Country Songs (Billboard)	1
US Billboard Hot 100	21
Canada Hot 100 (Billboard)	52

=== Year-end charts ===
Chart (2011)	Position
US Country Songs (Billboard)	2
US Billboard Hot 100	79

=== Decade-end charts ===
Chart (2010–2019)	Position
US Hot Country Songs (Billboard)	31

=== Certifications ===
Region	Certification	Certified units/sales
United States (RIAA)	2× Platinum	2,300,000
