= Beachin' =

Single by Jake Owen

from the album Days of Gold
- Released: February 3, 2014
- Recorded: 2013
- Genre: Country
- Length: 3:11
- Label: RCA Nashville
- Songwriters: Jaren Johnston; Jon Nite; Jimmy Robbins
- Producer: Joey Moi

Jake Owen singles chronology
"Days of Gold" (2013)	"Beachin'" (2014)	"What We Ain't Got" (2014)

"Beachin'" is a song recorded by American country music artist Jake Owen. It was released in February 2014 as the second single from his fourth studio album Days of Gold. The song was written by Jaren Johnston, Jon Nite and Jimmy Robbins. It garnered positive reviews from critics, praising the production and Owen's lyrical delivery.

"Beachin'" reached number one on both the Billboard Country Airplay and Hot Country Songs charts, giving him his third number-one country hit in both charts. It also gave him his second top 40 hit on the Hot 100, peaking at number 26. The song was certified Platinum by the Recording Industry Association of America (RIAA), and has sold 1,104,000 copies in that country as of August 2014. It received similar chart success in Canada, peaking at number one on the Country chart and number 39 on the Canadian Hot 100 chart.

The accompanying music video for the song, directed by Mason Dixon, was filmed in Daytona Beach.

== Reception ==
=== Critical ===
The song received a favorable review from Taste of Country, which said that "the warmth, the flavors and the smells seep through the speakers with every word from Owen's lips." Jon Freeman of Country Weekly gave the song a B grade, writing that "it's nothing particularly new in the lyrical department, but at least the party's out of the woods for a change." He called the production the "most intriguing" aspect of the song. In 2017, Billboard contributor Chuck Dauphin put "Beachin'" at number eight on his top 10 list of Owen's best songs.

=== Commercial ===
"Beachin'" debuted at number 55 on the Billboard Country Airplay chart for the week of February 8, 2014. It also debuted at number 44 on the Hot Country Songs chart for the week of November 30, 2013. It also debuted at number 94 on the Billboard Hot 100 chart for the week of April 12, 2014 and would later become his second top 40 single on the chart and his first since "Barefoot Blue Jean Night" in 2011. It reached number one on the Country Airplay chart dated July 19, 2014, becoming Owen's fifth number one single. The song was certified platinum by the Recording Industry Association of America on July 16, 2014. The song has sold 1,104,000 copies in the U.S. as of August 2014.

== Music video ==
The music video, filmed in Daytona Beach, was directed by Mason Dixon and premiered in November 2013.

== Charts and certifications ==
=== Weekly charts ===
Chart (2014)	Peak position
Canada Hot 100 (Billboard)	39
Canada Country (Billboard)	1
US Billboard Hot 100	26
US Country Airplay (Billboard)	1
US Hot Country Songs (Billboard)	1

=== Year-end charts ===
Chart (2014)	Position
US Billboard Hot 100	91
US Country Airplay (Billboard)	23
US Hot Country Songs (Billboard)	13

=== Certifications ===
Region	Certification	Certified units/sales
United States (RIAA)	Platinum	1,000,000^{‡}
^{‡} Sales+streaming figures based on certification alone.

== See also ==
- List of number-one country singles of 2014 (Canada)
- List of number-one country singles of 2014 (U.S.)
