= The One That Got Away (Jake Owen song) =

Single by Jake Owen

from the album Barefoot Blue Jean Night
- Released: May 21, 2012
- Recorded: 2011
- Genre: Country rock
- Length: 3:17
- Label: RCA Nashville
- Songwriters: Jake Owen; Jimmy Ritchey; Dallas Davidson
- Producers: Joey Moi; Rodney Clawson

Jake Owen singles chronology
"Alone With You" (2011)	"The One That Got Away" (2012)	"Back" (2012)

"The One That Got Away" is a song co-written and recorded by American country music artist Jake Owen. It is the ninth single of his career, and was released in May 2012 as the third single from his album Barefoot Blue Jean Night. Owen wrote the song with Jimmy Ritchey and Dallas Davidson.

== Content ==
"The One That Got Away" is a reminiscence of a former lover during the narrator's teenage years. According to co-writer Dallas Davidson, Owen " started talking about how the girls would come in for the summer. All the local guys down there would make a little summer girlfriend, but then they would leave. They would go back wherever they came from." Davidson also said that he wanted the song to have a "Tom Petty-ish groove".

== Critical reception ==
Billy Dukes of Taste of Country gave it three-and-a-half stars out of five. He thought that the song's release was perfectly timed for summer, and said that "Owen is becoming more adept at selling the emotion in his music, but he’s not quite at the level of someone like Keith Urban or Kenny Chesney."

Kevin John Coyne of Country Universe gave the song a C grade. Opining " So, “The One that Got Away” is about a summer love that ends when the weather changes. It's an old story. It's been done on the beach. It's been done at the seaside carnival. It's been done on the farm. It's been done in the fields. It's gotta be done with cleverness. Or distinctiveness. Or sincerity. This fails on all counts, leaving us with a generic summer song that's as easily forgotten as the love that it documents."

== Music video ==
The music video was directed by Mason Dixon and premiered in late June 2012.

== Chart performance ==
"The One That Got Away" debuted at number 55 on the Billboard Hot Country Songs chart for the week of May 26, 2012. It also debuted at number 93 on the Billboard Hot 100 chart for the week of August 25, 2012. It also debuted at number 97 on the Canadian Hot 100 chart for the week of November 3, 2012. The single reached number 1 on the Country Airplay chart.

Chart (2012–2013)	Peak position
Canada Hot 100 (Billboard)	65
US Billboard Hot 100	51
US Hot Country Songs (Billboard)	7
US Country Airplay (Billboard)	1

=== Year-end charts ===
Chart (2012)	Position
US Hot Country Songs (Billboard)	39

Chart (2013)	Position
US Country Airplay (Billboard)	85
US Hot Country Songs (Billboard)	83

== Certifications ==
Region	Certification	Certified units/sales
United States (RIAA)	Gold	500,000^{*}
^{*} Sales figures based on certification alone.
