= Jimmy Ritchey =

- Born: Centralia, Washington, U.S.
- Origin: Nashville, Tennessee, U.S.
- Genres: Country
- Occupations: Songwriter, record producer
- Years active: 2002-present

Jimmy Ritchey is an American country music songwriter and record producer from Centralia, Washington.

Ritchey got his start as a record producer after producing demos for Tommy Shane Steiner. Initially, Ritchey was not intended to produce Steiner's album, but he got to do so after producers Paul Worley and Frank Liddell encouraged the label to allow him.

Ritchey co-wrote several songs that have charted on Hot Country Songs: "I'm a Saint" by Mark Chesnutt; "Startin' with Me", "Something About a Woman", "Don't Think I Can't Love You", "Tell Me", and "The One That Got Away" by Jake Owen; and "Twang" and "I Gotta Get to You" by George Strait. He signed an exclusive agreement with BMG Chrysalis on December 3, 2012. Ritchey has had over 40 songs recorded by major-label artists. As a record producer, he has worked with Owen, Chesnutt, Greg Bates, and Clay Walker.
