= Jake Owen =

American country singer (born 1981)

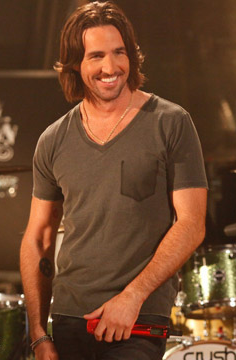
- Owen in 2011

Background information
- Born: Joshua Ryan Owen; August 28, 1981 (age 44) Winter Haven, Florida, U.S.
- Origin: Vero Beach, Florida, U.S.
- Genres: Country
- Occupations: Singer; songwriter
- Instruments: Vocals; guitar
- Years active: 2005–present
- Labels: RCA Nashville; Big Loud
- Website: jakeowen.net

Joshua Ryan Owen (born August 28, 1981), known professionally as Jake Owen, is an American country music singer. Signed to RCA Nashville in 2006, he released his debut studio album, Startin' with Me, that year.

This album produced three singles, all of which reached top 20 on the Billboard Hot Country Songs chart: his debut "Yee Haw", "Startin' with Me", and "Something About a Woman". His second studio album, 2009's Easy Does It, accounted for three more singles: "Don't Think I Can't Love You", "Eight Second Ride", and "Tell Me". In September 2011, Owen achieved his first number one hit with the title track to his third studio album Barefoot Blue Jean Night; also toppers were "Alone with You", "The One That Got Away", and "Anywhere with You". His fourth studio album, Days of Gold, produced two singles with its title track, which broke the top 20 in 2013, and the number one single "Beachin'".

Owen has also toured as an opening act for several other country artists, including Kenny Chesney, Brad Paisley, Little Big Town, Sugarland, Keith Urban, Darius Rucker and Jason Aldean.

== Early life ==
Joshua Ryan "Jake" Owen and his fraternal twin brother Jarrod were born in Winter Haven, Florida, on August 28, 1981. The brothers regularly participated in a variety of sports. Owen eventually took up golf, and began pursuing a career as a professional golfer, winning his first tournament at 15. After graduating from Vero Beach High School, he attended Florida State University. A wakeboarding accident which required reconstructive surgery left Owen unable to continue participating in the sport.

While recovering from his injuries, he borrowed a neighbor's guitar and began to teach himself how to play it. After seeing a guitarist perform at a campus bar, he asked the bar's owner if he could play a gig there. Eventually, he became a regular at the bar, and soon took up writing his own material as well. He then moved to Nashville, Tennessee, making his first stop at a bank to open a savings account; after telling the bank teller that he was a singer and songwriter, the teller then asked if he had any recordings available. He gave her a CD of his work, which she sent to the Warner/Chappell Music publishing company.

== Career ==
Although Warner/Chappell did not sign him to a contract, Owen eventually met the record producer and songwriter Jimmy Ritchey. They, along with songwriter Chuck Jones, wrote a song "Ghosts", which they had intended for Kenny Chesney. Chesney, ultimately, did not record "Ghosts", although it drew the attention of Sony BMG Nashville executives, who signed Owen to their RCA Nashville label in 2005. Per their suggestion, Owen changed his first name to Jake, so as to avoid confusion with Josh Turner and Josh Gracin.

=== 2006–2010: Startin' with Me and Easy Does It ===
In early 2006, Owen released his debut single, titled "Yee Haw". He describes the song (an up-tempo party anthem in which the narrator expresses his enjoyment with a cry of "yeehaw") as being written "to make people have a good time". It peaked at No.16 on the Billboard Hot Country Songs chart and served as the lead-off single on his debut album, Startin' with Me.

Released on July 25, 2006, the album featured 11 tracks, all co-written by him and his producer. Among them were his own recording of "Ghosts" and a duet with Randy Owen (no relation) of Alabama entitled "You Can Thank Dixie". After the album's release, Owen was signed as an opening act for acts such as Brad Paisley and Carrie Underwood.

The album's title track, a ballad in which the narrator expresses his desire to change everything in his life, was released as his second single. Spending more than thirty-five weeks on the Billboard country chart, "Startin' with Me" became his first top 10 hit, reaching a peak of No.6. Also in 2007, he went on tour with Alan Jackson and Brooks & Dunn. "Something About a Woman" was released in late 2007 as the third single. In September 2007, he and country quartet Little Big Town joined country duo Sugarland's tour. During this tour, the three acts began performing "Life in a Northern Town" (a cover of British pop group The Dream Academy's hit single from 1985). A music video of their live performance was aired on CMT. In April 2008, a recording of this performance entered the Billboard country chart based on unsolicited airplay.

Owen released his second studio album, Easy Does It, on February 24, 2009. The album debuted at No.2 on the Billboard Top Country Albums and No.13 on the Billboard 200. The lead-off single to the album, "Don't Think I Can't Love You" became his first top 5 country hit, reaching No.2 on the Hot Country Songs chart in April 2009. "Eight Second Ride", a song which was originally on Startin' with Me and newly recorded for Easy Does It, was the album's second single; it peaked at No.11 in January 2010. "Tell Me" was the album's third single, reaching number 35.

=== 2011–2012: Barefoot Blue Jean Night and Endless Summer ===
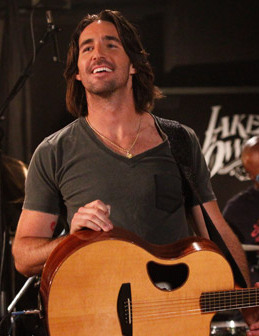
Owen in 2011

Owen released his third studio album, Barefoot Blue Jean Night, on August 30, 2011. The lead-off single and title track to the album, "Barefoot Blue Jean Night", became his first number one single on the country chart. The album's second single, "Alone with You", was released in October 2011, and like its predecessor, it reached number one on the country chart in April 2012. The album's next two singles, "The One That Got Away" and "Anywhere with You", both reached number one on the Country Airplay chart. Owen toured with Keith Urban in 2011 on his Get Closer World Tour.

He released an extended play titled Endless Summer on September 25, 2012. It includes "Summer Jam", a collaboration with Florida Georgia Line, which charted within the top 40 of Hot Country Songs despite not being released as a single.

=== 2013–2017: Days of Gold and American Love ===
The first single from Owen's fourth studio album, "Days of Gold", was released to country radio in August 2013. During Owen's June 2013 StageIt show, he confirmed that the album would also feature the new song "Ghost Town". The album, also titled Days of Gold, was released on December 3, 2013. In May 2015, Owen released a new non-album single to country radio, titled "Real Life". The song peaked at number 17 on the Country Airplay chart. It was eventually pulled from country radio after receiving overwhelmingly poor response. He performed the single live at the 2015 CMT (U.S. TV channel) Award show.

On February 2, 2016, Owen announced via Facebook that a new single would be released to country radio on March 7, 2016, titled "American Country Love Song". It is the lead single from his fifth studio album American Love which was released on July 29, 2016.

=== 2017–2022: Label change and Greetings from... Jake ===
In November 2017, it was announced that Owen had left RCA in favor of Big Loud Records. Owen released two singles for the label: "I Was Jack (You Were Diane)" and "Down to the Honkytonk". These were included on his first Big Loud album, Greetings from... Jake, which released on March 29, 2019. The album charted at #8 on the Billboard Country album chart, reportedly selling 4,000 copies in the first week. The album's third single, Homemade, was released on June 3, 2019, and reached no. 1 on the Country Airplay chart. Owen performed at the Medina County Fair on July 31, 2019.

The album's fourth single, "Made for You", was released on May 18, 2020. He released the single "Best Thing Since Backroads" in 2021, and joined Canadian country duo the Reklaws on the single "11 Beers" in 2022.

=== 2023–present: Loose Cannon ===
Owen released his seventh studio album Loose Cannon on June 23, 2023. He was a co-writer on the song "Good Time Getting There", recorded and released by Dallas Smith on his self-titled album in October 2023.

== Personal life ==
Owen married model Lacey Buchanan on May 7, 2012, in Vero Beach, Florida. The couple became engaged on April 7, 2012, after Owen proposed to Buchanan onstage in front of a crowd in his hometown of Vero Beach at his annual charity event. After proposing, he jokingly asked, "You're probably wondering where your ring is, right?" referring to the fact that he proposed without a ring, and to his single "Don't Think I Can't Love You" which he had performed prior to proposing. The couple had their first daughter on November 22, 2012, Thanksgiving Day. The couple divorced in August 2015 after three years of marriage. Owen and girlfriend Erica Hartlein welcomed a daughter on April 29, 2019.

In 2010, Owen founded a nonprofit charity, which has raised over $3 million as of 2022. Initially to offer financial support on a national level to children battling cancer, it now provides assistance to various youth organizations in Indian River County. The foundation holds an annual Jake Owen Foundation weekend where he performs to raise money for the foundation.

Owen is a keen golfer, and, in November 2017, it was announced that he would be teeing up in the Nashville Golf Open on the Web.com Tour in May 2018.

While speaking with Barstool Sports in an April 2, 2019, interview, Jake Owen described an encounter with Phil Mickelson at Jordan Spieth's wedding in November 2018, where Mickelson told Owen to go "f--k" himself. The verbal altercation was initiated by Owen, who voiced his disappointment with The Match: Tiger vs Phil head-to-head match play golf challenge, a pay-per-view event on which he spent $29.99 and for which he wanted a refund. As told by Owen, Mickelson pulled a wad of $100 bills from his pocket and responded, "Yeah, I won 90,000 of these yesterday. Take one and go f--k yourself." The event purse was $9 million. Mickelson verified the truth of the story via Twitter.

During gay pride month in June 2019, Owen released a video performing a cover of "Believe", a song made popular by Cher and one of the anthems used by the LGBT community. It was in support of his close friends and coworkers who are gay. The post sparked backlash from fans who threatened to boycott his concerts and music. In response, Owen suggested to those fans that they come to his concert and he would be happy to give them a hug and stated "You need one."

== Discography ==
- Startin' with Me (2006)
- Easy Does It (2009)
- Barefoot Blue Jean Night (2011)
- Days of Gold (2013)
- American Love (2016)
- Greetings from... Jake (2019)
- Loose Cannon (2023)
- Dreams to Dream (2025)

== Awards and nominations ==
WINNER - Academy of Country Music (ACM)

- 2008: Top New Male Vocalist

WINNER - American Country Awards

- 2012: Breakthrough Artist of the Year

NOMINEE - ACM

- 2008: Top New Artist
- 2008: Single of the Year - Down in the Honkytonk - Jake Owen Artist
- 2018: Vocal Event of the Year - Life in a Northern Town - Jake Owen Artist

NOMINEE - American Country Awards

- 2011: Breakthrough Artist of the Year
- 2012: Single By a Breakthrough - Alone With You - Jake Owen Artist
- 2012: Music Video of the Year - Alone With You - Jake Owen Artist
- 2012: Music Video of the Year by a Male - Alone With You - Jake Owen Artist
- 2013: Single By a Male - The One That Got Away - Jake Owen Artist

NOMINEE - Canadian Country Music Awards

- 2023: Musical Collaboration of the Year - "11 Beers" (with the Reklaws)

NOMINEE - Country Music Association Awards

- 2008: Musical Event of the Year - "Life in a Northern Town" (with Sugarland and Little Big Town)
- 2009: New Artist of the Year
- 2020: Video of the Year - "Homemade" (directed by Justin Clough)
