= List of UK Country Albums Chart number ones of 2016 =

These are the Official Charts Company's UK Country Albums Chart number ones of 2016. The chart week runs from Friday to Thursday with the chart-date given as the following Thursday. Chart positions are based the multi-metric consumption of country music in the United Kingdom, blending traditional album sales, track equivalent albums, and streaming equivalent albums. The chart contains 20 positions.

In the iteration of the chart dated 1 January, Brave, the debut album by British duo The Shires, spent its thirty fifth total week at number one, and was briefly displaced by Rhiannon Giddens' Tomorrow Is My Turn (which reached the summit after eighteen weeks on the chart), before returning to the top spot for another two weeks. Later in the year, The Shires released their second album My Universe, which spent eleven consecutive weeks at number one. Beginning on 12 February, Chris Isaak debuted with First Comes the Night, which went on to hold the top spot for four weeks until it was replaced by country legend Loretta Lynn and her album Full Circle, becoming her second album to hit number one in the UK and her final number one before her death in 2022. Chris Stapleton's first album Traveller premiered on the chart in mid-March and would go on to spend four nonconsecutive weeks at the top. On 11 May, 80s pop star Cyndi Lauper achieved her first country number one with Detour, a collection of country music covers that inspired her as a child. Colvin & Earle, a collaborative project by Shawn Colvin and Steve Earle spent four weeks at number one, becoming Colvin's first number one country album and Earle's ninth. Following this, Ward Thomas' debut record From Where We Stand returned to the chart peak for two weeks, and their second album Cartwheels spent five non-consecutive weeks at number one and became the first British country album to reach the top spot on the all genre UK Albums Chart. Other artists who spent multiple weeks at number one include Lucinda Williams, Steven Tyler, and The Cadillac Three, which each spent two weeks, and Dolly Parton, who spent three weeks with Pure & Simple. The final number one of the year was Cartwheels.

== Chart history ==
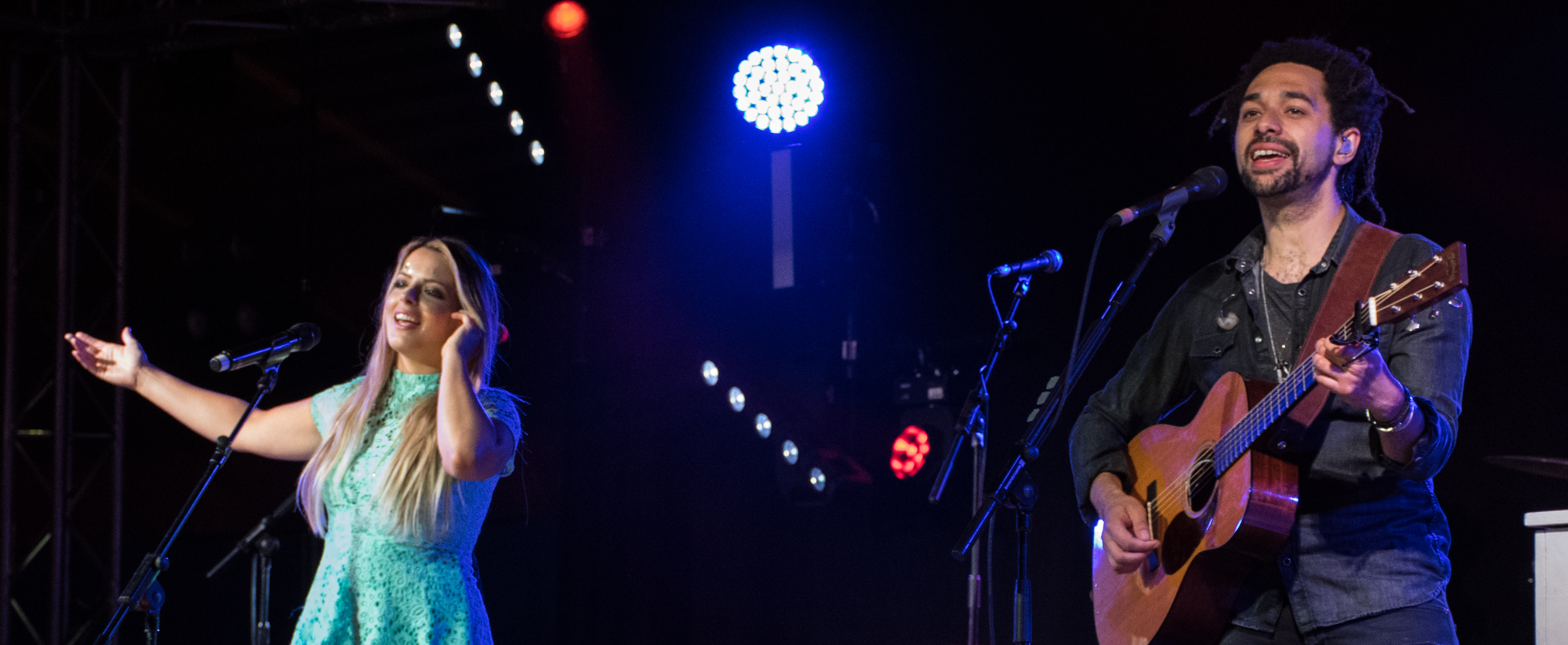
The Shires spent a total of fifteen weeks at number one with their debut Brave, and their sophomore release My Universe.

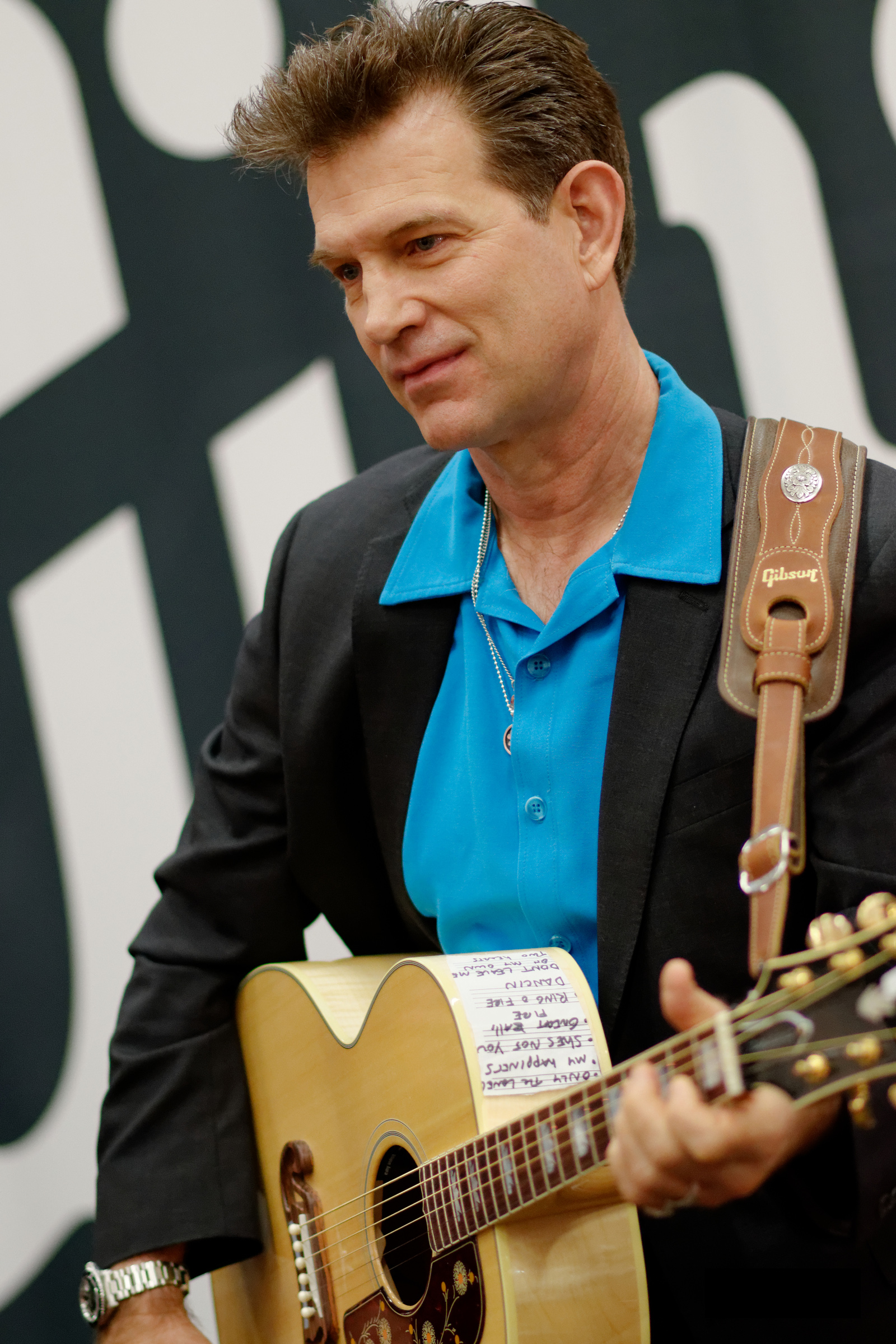
Chris Isaak held the top spot for four weeks with First Comes the Night.

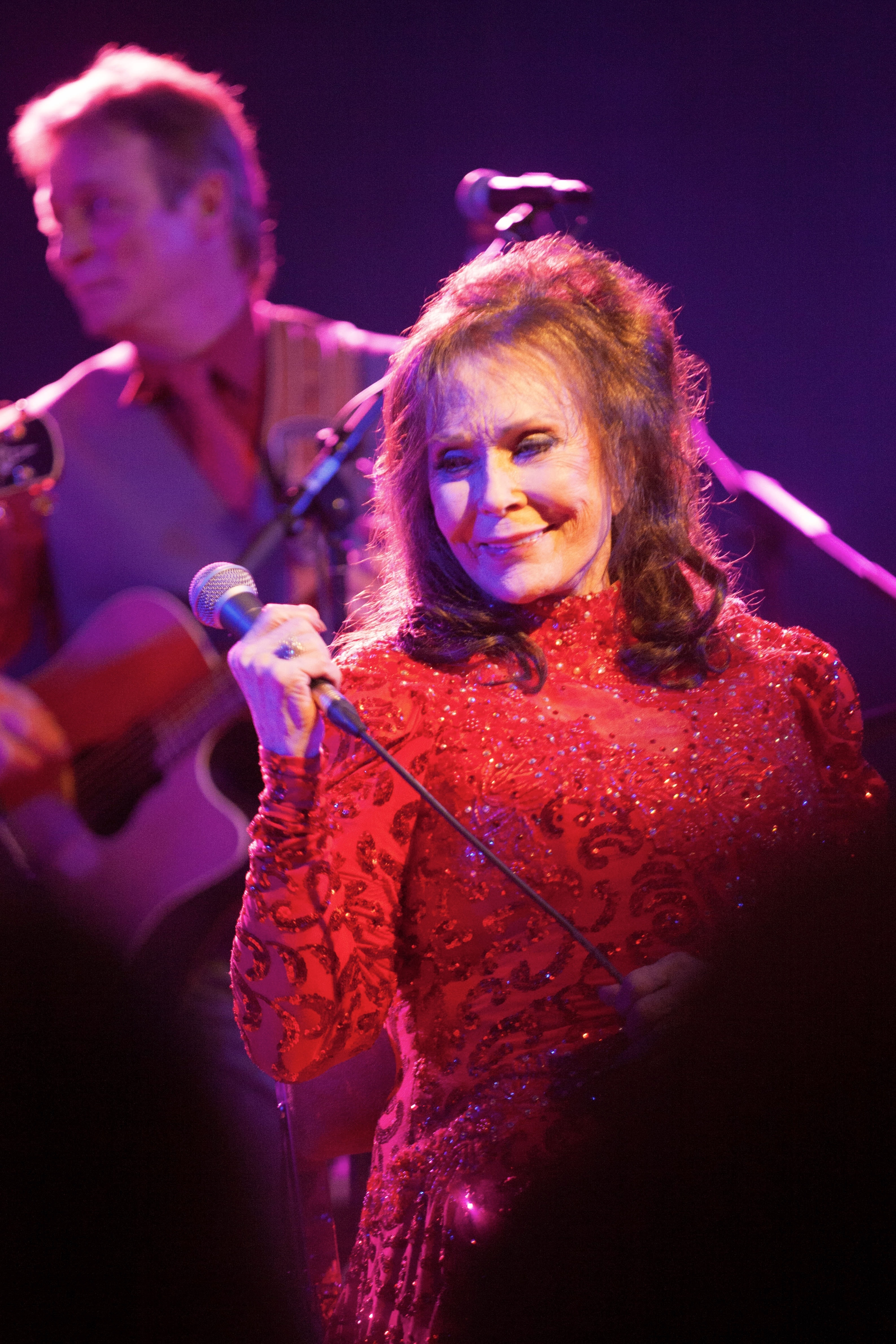
Full Circle became country legend Loretta Lynn's final UK number one before her death in 2022.

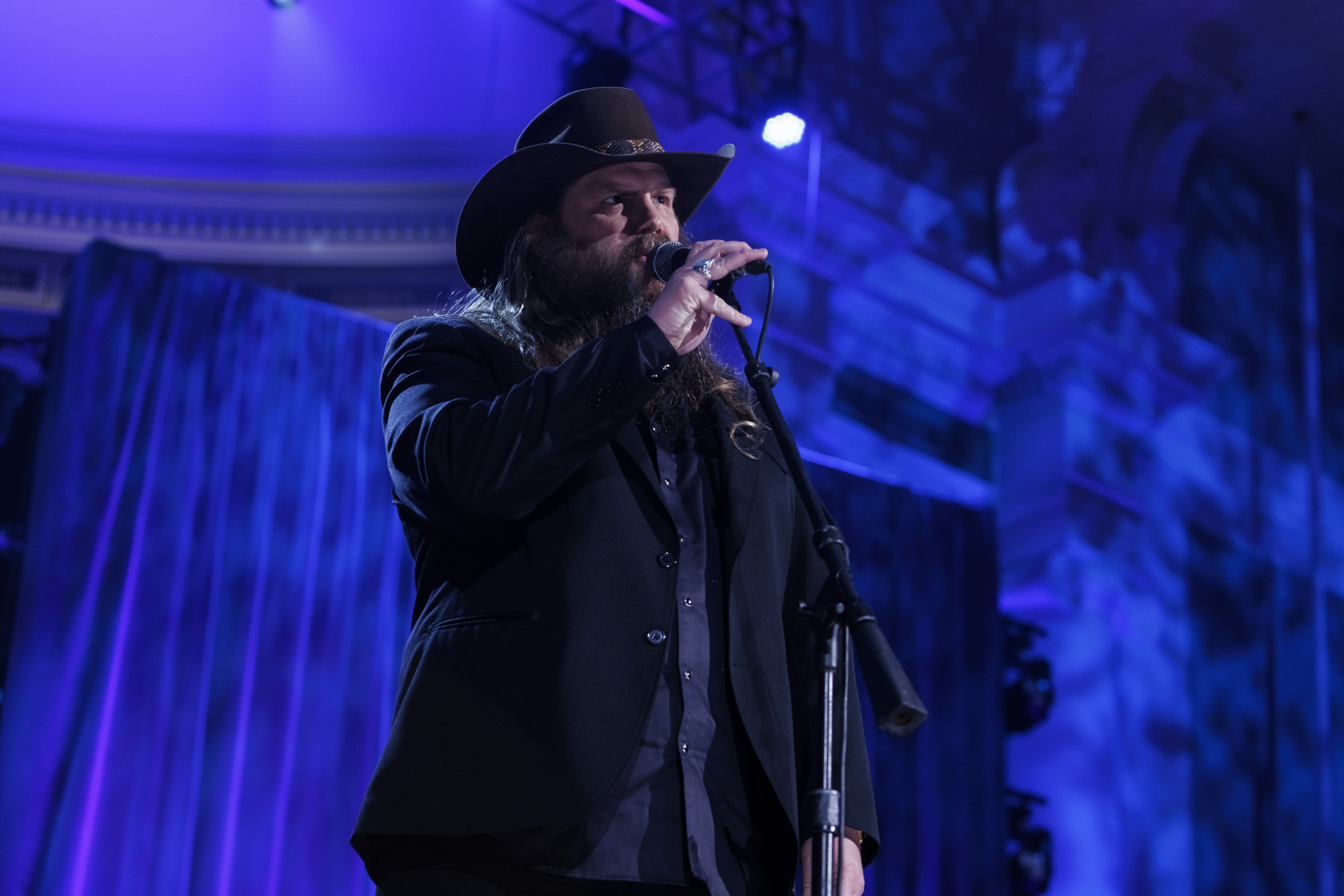
Chris Stapleton's Traveller spent four weeks at number one.

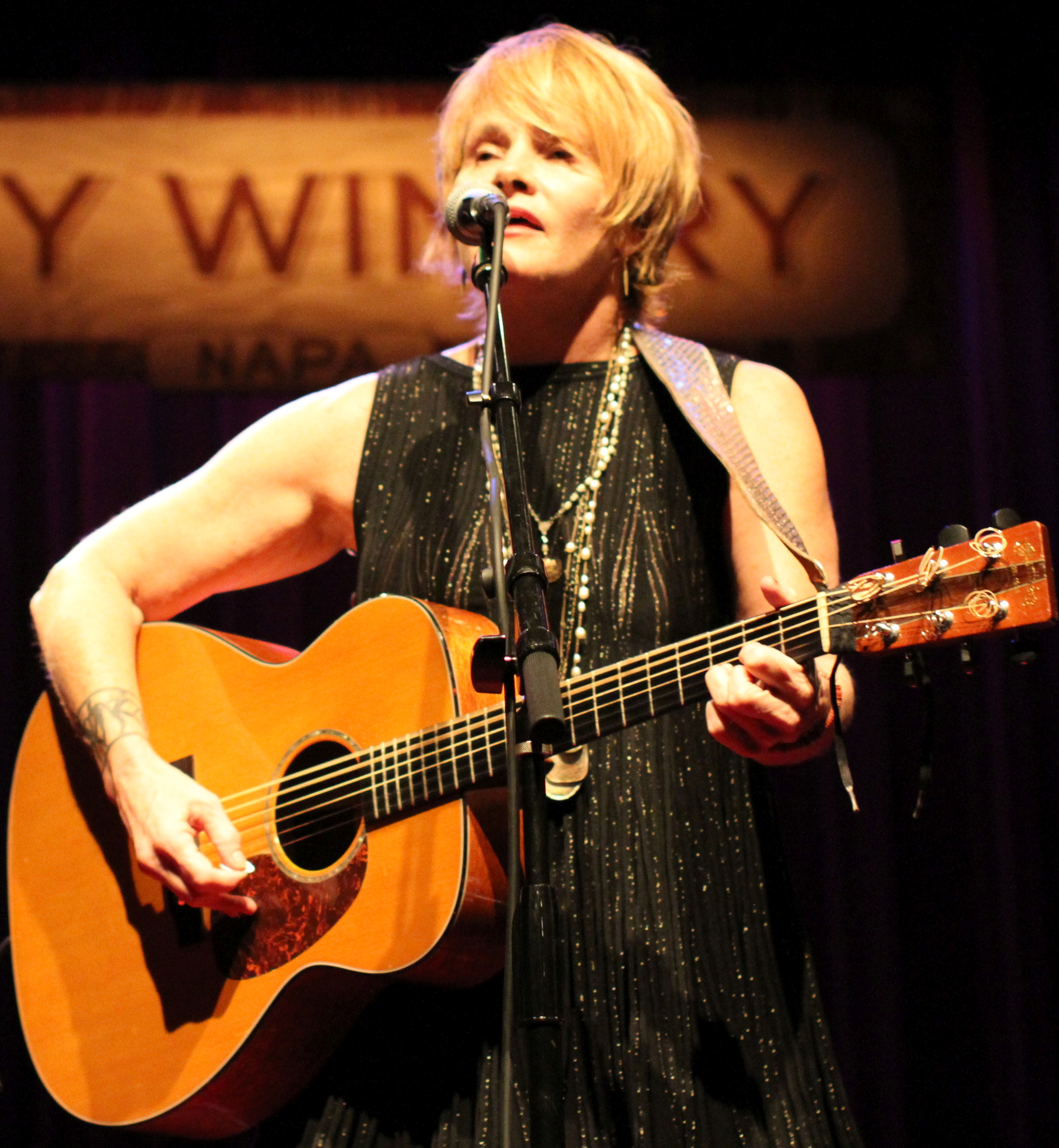
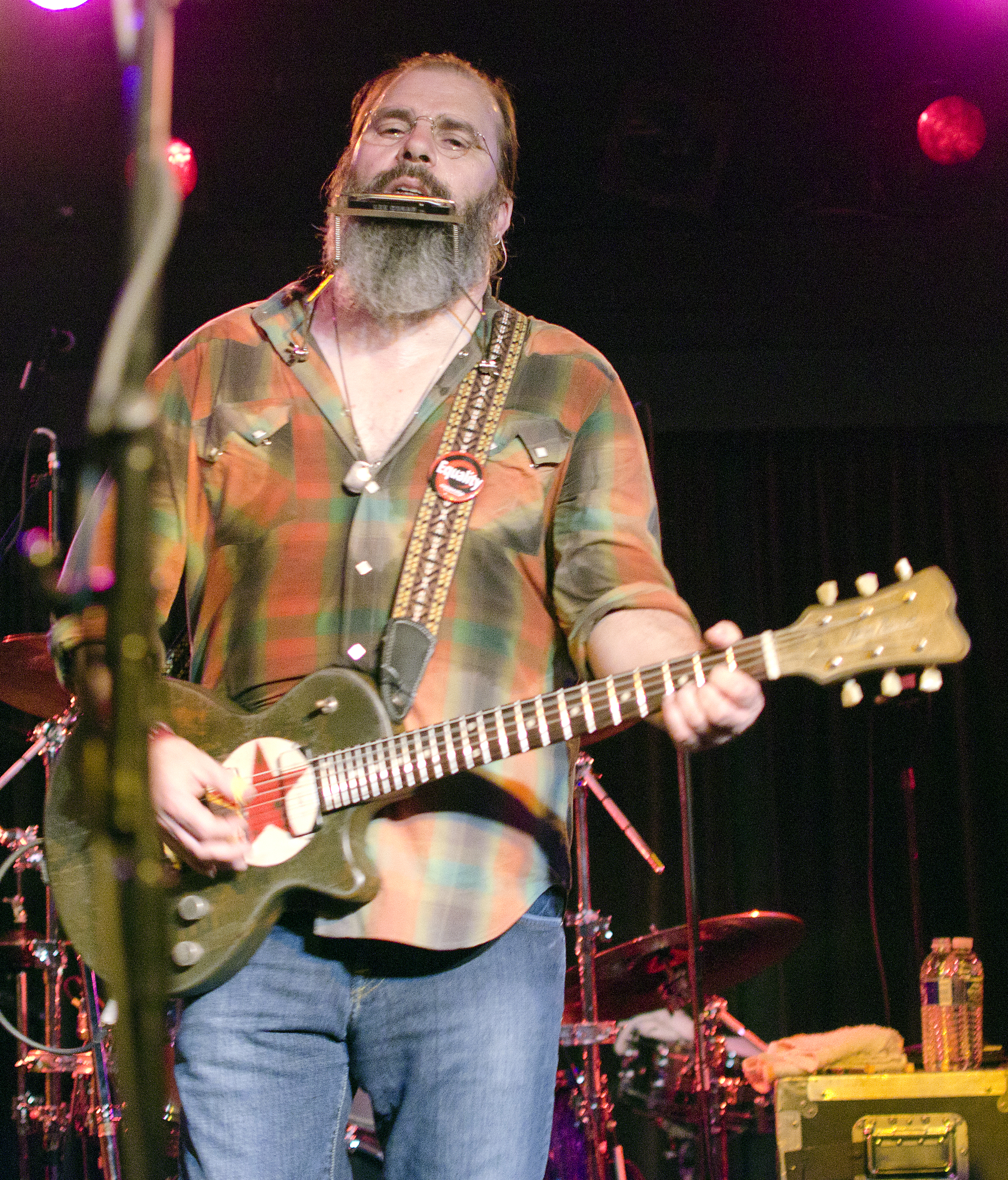
Shawn Colvin and Steve Earle were number one for four consecutive weeks with their collaborative project Colvin & Earle.

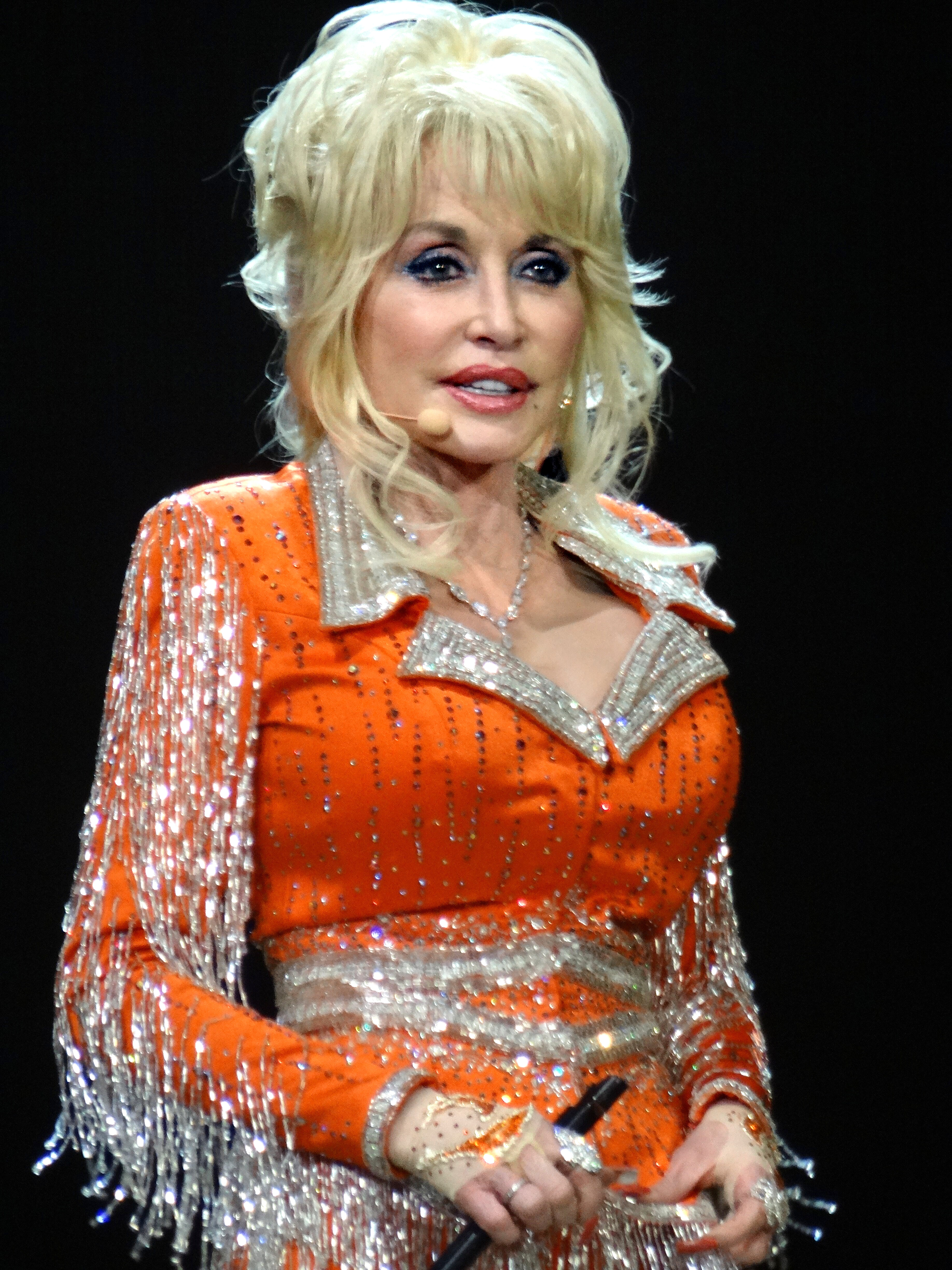
Pure & Simple earned Dolly Parton her eighth number one album in the UK.

Issue date	Album	Artist(s)	Record label	Ref.
1 January	Brave	The Shires	Decca	
8 January	Tomorrow Is My Turn	Rhiannon Giddens	Nonesuch	
15 January	Brave	The Shires	Decca	
22 January	Brave	The Shires	Decca	
29 January	The Ghosts of Highway 20	Lucinda Williams	Highway 20	
5 February	The Ghosts of Highway 20	Lucinda Williams	Highway 20	
12 February	First Comes the Night	Chris Isaak	Rhino	
19 February	First Comes the Night	Chris Isaak	Rhino	
26 February	First Comes the Night	Chris Isaak	Rhino	
4 March	First Comes the Night	Chris Isaak	Rhino	
11 March	Full Circle	Loretta Lynn	Legacy	
18 March	Traveller	Chris Stapleton	UCJ	
25 March	You Can't Go Back If There's Nothing To Go Back To	Richmond Fontaine	Decor	
1 April	Traveller	Chris Stapleton	UCJ	
8 April	Little Windows	Teddy Thompson & Kelly Jones	Cooking Vinyl	
15 April	Traveller	Chris Stapleton	UCJ	
22 April	Traveller	Chris Stapleton	UCJ	
29 April	A Sailor's Guide to Earth	Sturgill Simpson	Atlantic	
6 May	Stayin' Up All Night	Nathan Carter	Decca	
13 May	Detour	Cyndi Lauper	Rhino	
20 May	The Things That We Are Made Of	Mary Chapin Carpenter	Lambent Light	
27 May	Midwest Farmer's Daughter	Margo Price	Third Man	
3 June	Black	Dierks Bentley	Capitol	
10 June	Obsessed	Dan + Shay	Warner Bros.	
17 June	Colvin & Earle	Shawn Colvin & Steve Earle	Concord Records	
24 June	Colvin & Earle	Shawn Colvin & Steve Earle	Concord Records	
1 July	Colvin & Earle	Shawn Colvin & Steve Earle	Concord Records	
8 July	Colvin & Earle	Shawn Colvin & Steve Earle	Concord Records	
15 July	From Where We Stand	Ward Thomas	WTW Music	
22 July	From Where We Stand	Ward Thomas	WTW Music	
26 July	We're All Somebody from Somewhere	Steven Tyler	Dot/Republic	
5 August	We're All Somebody from Somewhere	Steven Tyler	Dot/Republic	
12 August	Bury Me in My Boots	The Cadillac Three	Big Machine	
19 August	Bury Me in My Boots	The Cadillac Three	Big Machine	
26 August	Pure & Simple	Dolly Parton	RCA Nashville	
2 September	Pure & Simple	Dolly Parton	RCA Nashville	
9 September	Pure & Simple	Dolly Parton	RCA Nashville	
16 September	Cartwheels	Ward Thomas	Sony/WTW	
23 September	Cartwheels	Ward Thomas	Sony/WTW	
30 September	Cartwheels	Ward Thomas	Sony/WTW	
7 October	My Universe	The Shires	Decca	
14 October	My Universe	The Shires	Decca	
21 October	My Universe	The Shires	Decca	
28 October	My Universe	The Shires	Decca	
4 November	My Universe	The Shires	Decca	
11 November	My Universe	The Shires	Decca	
18 November	My Universe	The Shires	Decca	
25 November	My Universe	The Shires	Decca	
25 November	My Universe	The Shires	Decca	
2 December	My Universe	The Shires	Decca	
9 December	My Universe	The Shires	Decca	
16 December	My Universe	The Shires	Decca	
23 December	Cartwheels	Ward Thomas	Sony/WTW	
30 December	Cartwheels	Ward Thomas	Sony/WTW	

== Most weeks at number one ==
Weeks at number one	Artist
15	The Shires
7	Ward Thomas
4	Chris Isaak
4	Chris Stapleton
4	Shawn Colvin & Steve Earle
3	Dolly Parton
3	Lucinda Williams
3	Steven Tyler
2	The Cadillac Three

== See also ==
- List of UK Albums Chart number ones of 2016
- List of UK Dance Singles Chart number ones of 2016
- List of UK Album Downloads Chart number ones of 2016
- List of UK Independent Albums Chart number ones of 2016
- List of UK R&B Albums Chart number ones of 2016
- List of UK Rock & Metal Albums Chart number ones of 2016
- List of UK Compilation Chart number ones of the 2010s
