= UK Country Albums Chart =

UK record chart

The UK Country Artists Albums Chart is a music charts compiled in the United Kingdom by the Official Charts Company from sales of songs in the country music genre in record stores and digital downloads. The chart can be viewed on the Official Charts Company's website and is released weekly. The archive on the Official Charts Company website goes back to 30 January 1994, with the first listed number one album being K.d. lang's Even Cowgirls Get the Blues, the soundtrack to the film of the same name.

Digital downloads became eligible on the Country Albums chart in June 2009. Prior to that, only vinyl and CD sales were compiled into the chart.

The Official Country Artists Albums Chart contains 20 positions.

Another chart complied by the Official Charts Company, the UK Country Compilations Chart, collates data on the sales of compilation albums. On March 10, 2024, the UK Country Airplay chart debuted. Monitored by Radiomonitor and the UK wing of the Country Music Association, chart rankings collate information from a range of participating radio stations to identify the most listened to country music single in the UK each week. The chart itself is posted on Holler Country.

== Number ones by year ==
- Lists of UK Country Albums Chart number ones

== Artist milestones ==
=== Most number-one albums ===
The following artists have had five or more of their albums reach number one on the UK Country Albums Chart:

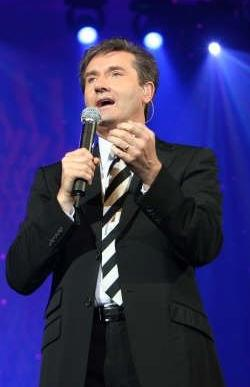
Daniel O'Donnell has earned sixteen number one albums and has spent a leading 161 weeks at the chart peak.

Albums	Artist	Ref.
16	Daniel O'Donnell	
13	Steve Earle (Note: Including five credited with the Dukes, and one with Shawn Colvin.)	
9	Lady A	
9	Willie Nelson	
8	Dolly Parton	
7	Carrie Underwood	
7	Johnny Cash	
7	LeAnn Rimes	
6
6	Alison Krauss (Note: Including four credited with Union Station.)	
6	Kacey Musgraves	
6	Mary Chapin Carpenter	
6	Nathan Carter	
6	The Shires	
5
5	Chris Stapleton	
5	Garth Brooks	
5	Glen Campbell	
5	Luke Combs	

=== Most cumulative weeks at number one ===
The following artists have spent more than 40 weeks at number one overall on the UK Country Albums Chart:

Weeks at no.1	Artist	Albums (Weeks at number one)	Ref.
161	Daniel O'Donnell	The Very Best Of (4), A Date with Daniel Live (4), Last Waltz (9), Especially for You (11), Timeless (8), Songs of Inspiration (36), Love Songs (7), Faith & Inspiration (10), Live Laugh Love (6), Yesterday's Memories (1), At the End of the Day (11), The Jukebox Years (15), Welcome to My World (15), Country Boy (15), Peace in the Valley (9), Wish You Well (1)	
137	Shania Twain	The Woman in Me (6), Come On Over (118), Up! (49)	
107	Lady A	Need You Now (41), Own the Night (36), Need You Now/Own the Night (2), Golden (13); 747 (9), Ocean (3), What a Song Can Do: Chapter One (1), What a Song Can Do (2)	
105	Taylor Swift	Fearless (46), Taylor Swift (5), Fearless (Taylor's Version) (54)	
87	The Shires	Brave (37), My Universe (11), Accidentally on Purpose (15), Good Years (11), 10 Year Plan (12), Bonfire (1)	
87	Johnny Cash	American IV: The Man Comes Around (43), At San Quentin (10), American V: A Hundred Highways (11), American VI: Ain't No Grave (4), The Classics (1), Out Among the Stars (15), Songwriter (3)	
45	Garth Brooks	In Pieces (13), Fresh Horses (16), Sevens (9), Scarecrow (1), Man Against Machine (6)	
42	Eagles	The Very Best Of (1), Long Road Out of Eden (41)	

Note: Albums are listed in the order they reached number one, which may not necessarily be the order they were released.

=== Most entries on the chart ===
The following artists have had ten or more of their albums appear on the UK Country Albums Chart:

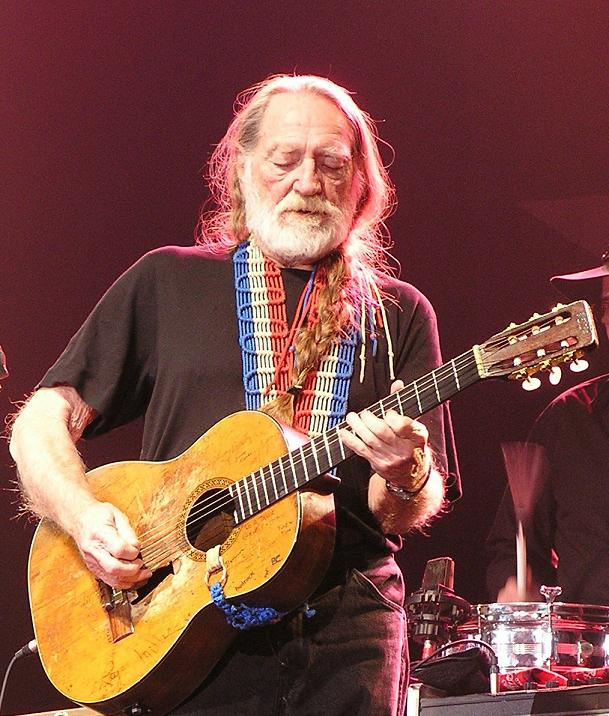
Willie Nelson holds the record for most entries on the chart, with forty two.

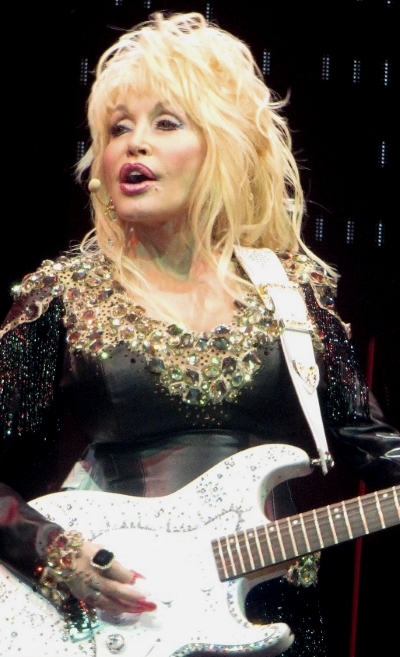
Dolly Parton has the most entries for a female artist, with twenty three.

Albums	Artist	Ref.
42	Willie Nelson	
31	Johnny Cash	
25	Daniel O'Donnell	
23	Dolly Parton	
19	Alan Jackson	
17	Tim McGraw	
16	Steve Earle	
15	Dwight Yoakam	
15	Emmylou Harris	
15	Kenny Chesney	
15	Reba McEntire	
14	George Strait	
13	Garth Brooks	
13	LeAnn Rimes	
12	Brad Paisley	
12	Mary Chapin Carpenter	
12	Toby Keith	
11	Martina McBride	
11	Nathan Carter	
10	Keith Urban	
10	Trisha Yearwood	
10	Vince Gill	

== Album milestones ==
=== Most weeks at number one ===
The following albums have spent more than 30 weeks at number one:

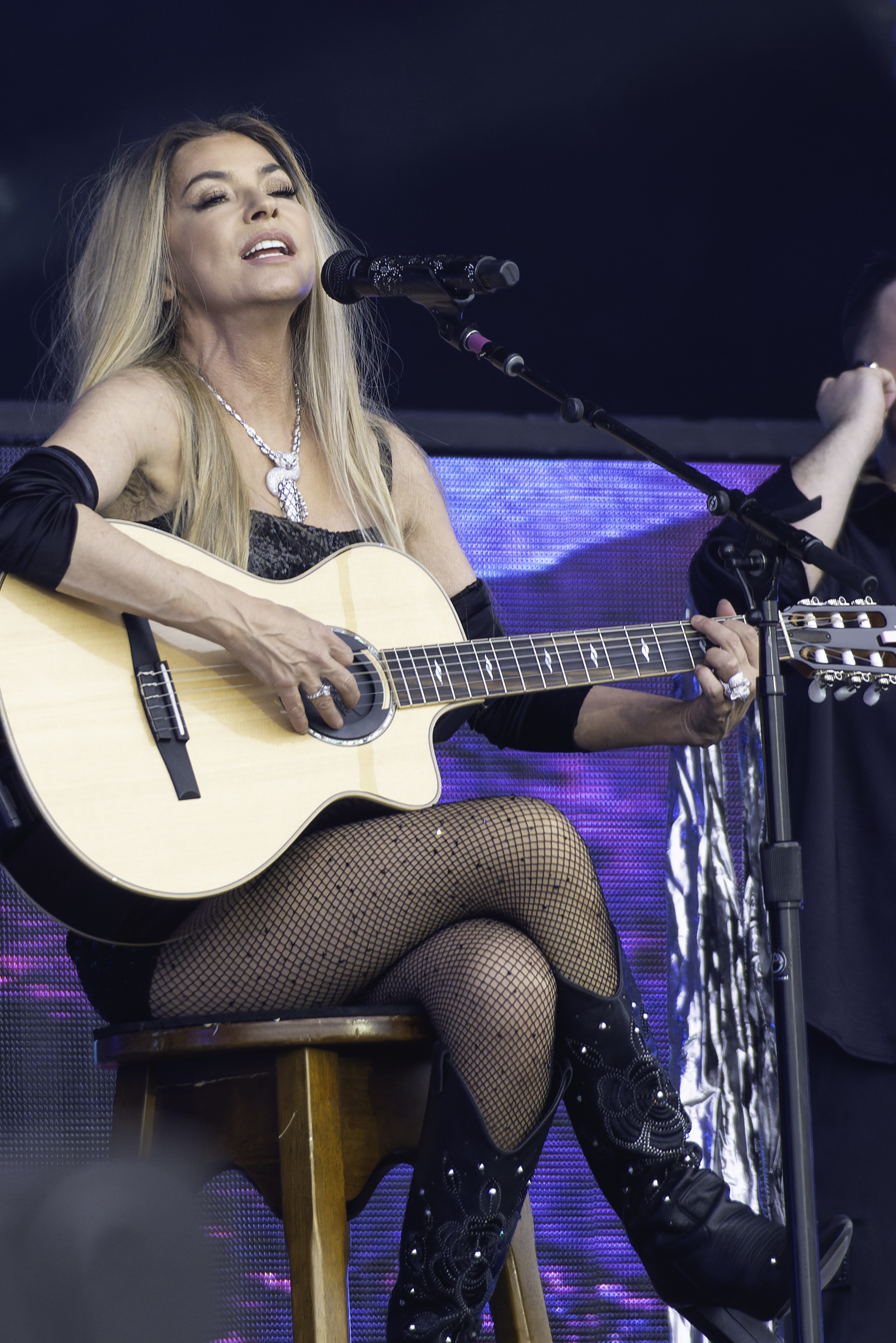
Come On Over, the 1997 album by Shania Twain, has spent a leading 118 weeks at number one.

Weeks	Album	Artist	Year(s)	Ref.
118	Come On Over	Shania Twain	1997-2023	
54	Fearless (Taylor's Version)	Taylor Swift	2021-2024	
49	Up!	Shania Twain	2002-2004	
46	Fearless	Taylor Swift	2008-2010	
43	American IV: The Man Comes Around	Johnny Cash	2003-2007	
41	Long Road Out of Eden	Eagles	2007-2009	
39	Need You Now	Lady Antebellum	2010-2013	
37	Brave	The Shires	2015-2016	
36	Own the Night	Lady Antebellum	2011-2012	
36	Songs of Inspiration	Daniel O'Donnell	1996-1997	
30	Trampoline	The Mavericks	1998-1999	

=== Most weeks on the chart ===
The following albums have spent more than 150 weeks on the UK Country Albums chart:

Weeks	Album	Artist	Year(s)	Ref.
550	Come On Over	Shania Twain	1997-2024	
373	Traveller	Chris Stapleton	2016-2026	
343	The Woman in Me	Shania Twain	1996-2023	
314	American IV: The Man Comes Around	Johnny Cash	2003-2009	
309	Wide Open Spaces	Dixie Chicks	1998-2016	
280	Fearless (Taylor's Version)	Taylor Swift	2021-2025	
275	What You See Is What You Get	Luke Combs	2019-2025	
231	Songs of Inspiration	Daniel O'Donnell	1996-2001	
226	In Pieces	Garth Brooks	1994-1998	
205	Fearless	Taylor Swift	2009-2025	
204	Taylor Swift	Taylor Swift	2009-2025	
198	Need You Now	Lady Antebellum	2010-2017	
193	Long Road Out of Eden	Eagles	2007-2021	
188	Up!	Shania Twain	2002-2019	
180	Own the Night	Lady Antebellum	2011-2019	
177	Growin' Up	Luke Combs	2023-2026	
165	Sittin' on Top of the World	LeAnn Rimes	1998-2002	
165	Gettin' Old	Luke Combs	2023-2026	
162	Fly	Dixie Chicks	1999-2003	
158	Home	Dixie Chicks	2002-2006	
151	Zach Bryan	Zach Bryan	2023-2026	

== Year-end number-one albums ==
The following albums spent the most cumulative weeks at number one in their respective year:

- 2007: Easy Tiger - Ryan Adams
- 2008: Long Road Out of Eden - Eagles
- 2009: Fearless - Taylor Swift
- 2010: Need You Now - Lady Antebellum
- 2011: Paper Airplane - Alison Krauss & Union Station
- 2012: Own the Night - Lady Antebellum
- 2013: Golden - Lady Antebellum
- 2014: Out Among the Stars - Johnny Cash
- 2015: Brave - The Shires
- 2016: My Universe - The Shires
- 2017: Adiós - Glen Campbell
- 2018: Accidentally on Purpose - The Shires
- 2019: Reckless & Me - Kiefer Sutherland
- 2020: Good Years - The Shires
- 2021: Fearless (Taylor's Version) - Taylor Swift
- 2022: 10 Year Plan - The Shires
- 2023: Gettin' Old - Luke Combs
- 2024: Fearless (Taylor's Version) - Taylor Swift
- 2025: Look Up - Ringo Starr
