= My Universe =

My Universe may refer to:

- My Universe (album), by the Shires, 2016
  - My Universe Tour, their 2016–2017 tour in support of the album
- "My Universe" (song), by Coldplay and BTS, 2021
- "My Universe", a song by Stray Kids from the 2020 album In Life, a re-release of Go Live

== See also ==
- My Universe in Lower Case, a 2011 Mexican drama film
- Mr. Universe (disambiguation)
