= UK Tour 2015 =

2015 concert tour by the Shires

- Tour by The Shires
- Associated album: Brave
- Start date: 8 April 2015
- End date: 24 October 2015
- Legs: 2
- No. of shows: 30

The Shires concert chronology
- UK Tour 2015; My Universe Tour

The Shires announced a UK tour in April 2015 in support of their debut album Brave. The duo also announced a second leg of the tour for October 2015 with the tour concluding at London O2 Shepherd Bush

== Setlist ==
The setlist is the April 14 show at London, Union Chapel and is the setlist for leg 1 of the tour

1. Nashville Grey Skies
2. Drink You Away
3. All Over Again
4. State Lines
5. Brave
6. I Just Wanna Love You
7. Friday Night
8. Jekyll and Hyde
9. Only Midnight
10. Made In England
11. Tonight

Encore:

1. Black and White
2. Islands in the Stream (Bee Gees cover)

The setlist is of the October 24 show at London O2 Shepherd Bush and is for the second leg of the tour

1. All Over Again
2. Nashville Grey Skies
3. I Ain't Leaving Without Your Love (Striking Matches cover)
4. Only Midnight
5. Brave
6. I Just Wanna Love You
7. Other People's Things
8. Drive
9. Same
10. State Lines
11. Runaway (The Corrs cover)
12. Friday Night
13. Jekyll and Hyde
14. Made In England
15. Tonight

Encore:

1. Black and White
2. Islands in the Stream (Bee Gees cover)

== Tour dates ==
| Date | City | Country | Venue |
First leg
| 8 April 2015 | Leeds | England | Brudenell Social Club |
| 9 April 2015 | Gateshead | England | Sage |
| 10 April 2015 | Glasgow | Scotland | Òran Mór |
| 12 April 2015 | Manchester | England | Manchester Academy |
| 13 April 2015 | Milton Keynes | England | The Stables |
| 14 April 2015 | London | England | Union Chapel |
| 15 April 2015 | Bristol | England | Bierkeller Theatre |
| 17 April 2015 | Birmingham | England | The Library at The Institute |
| 18 April 2015 | Oxford | England | O2 Academy Oxford |
| 19 April 2015 | Brighton | England | Concorde |
| 21 April 2015 | Portsmouth | England | The Wedgewood Rooms |
| 22 April 2015 | York | England | Pocklington Arts Centre |
Second leg
| 1 October 2015 | Bedford | England | Corn Exchange, Bedford |
| 2 October 2015 | Carmarthen | Wales | Lyric Theatre |
| 4 October 2015 | Cardiff | Wales | Glee Club |
| 5 October 2015 | Exeter | England | Phoenix |
| 6 October 2015 | Portsmouth | England | Pyramids Centre |
| 8 October 2015 | Folkestone | England | Leas Cliff Hall |
| 10 October 2015 | Inverness | Scotland | Ironworkd |
| 11 October 2015 | Edinburgh | Scotland | Liquid Rooms |
| 12 October 2015 | Aberdeen | Scotland | Lemon Tree |
| 14 October 2015 | Middlesbrough | England | Empire |
| 15 October 2015 | Sheffield | England | The Leadmill |
| 16 October 2015 | Northampton | England | Roadmender |
| 18 October 2015 | Birmingham | England | Institute |
| 19 October 2015 | Liverpool | England | O2 Academy Liverpool |
| 20 October 2015 | Cambridge | England | Cambridge Junction |
| 22 October 2015 | Bath | England | Pavilion |
| 23 October 2015 | Basingstoke | England | The Anvil |
| 24 October 2015 | London | England | O2 Shepherds Bush Empire |
