= Sinead Burgess =

Australian musician

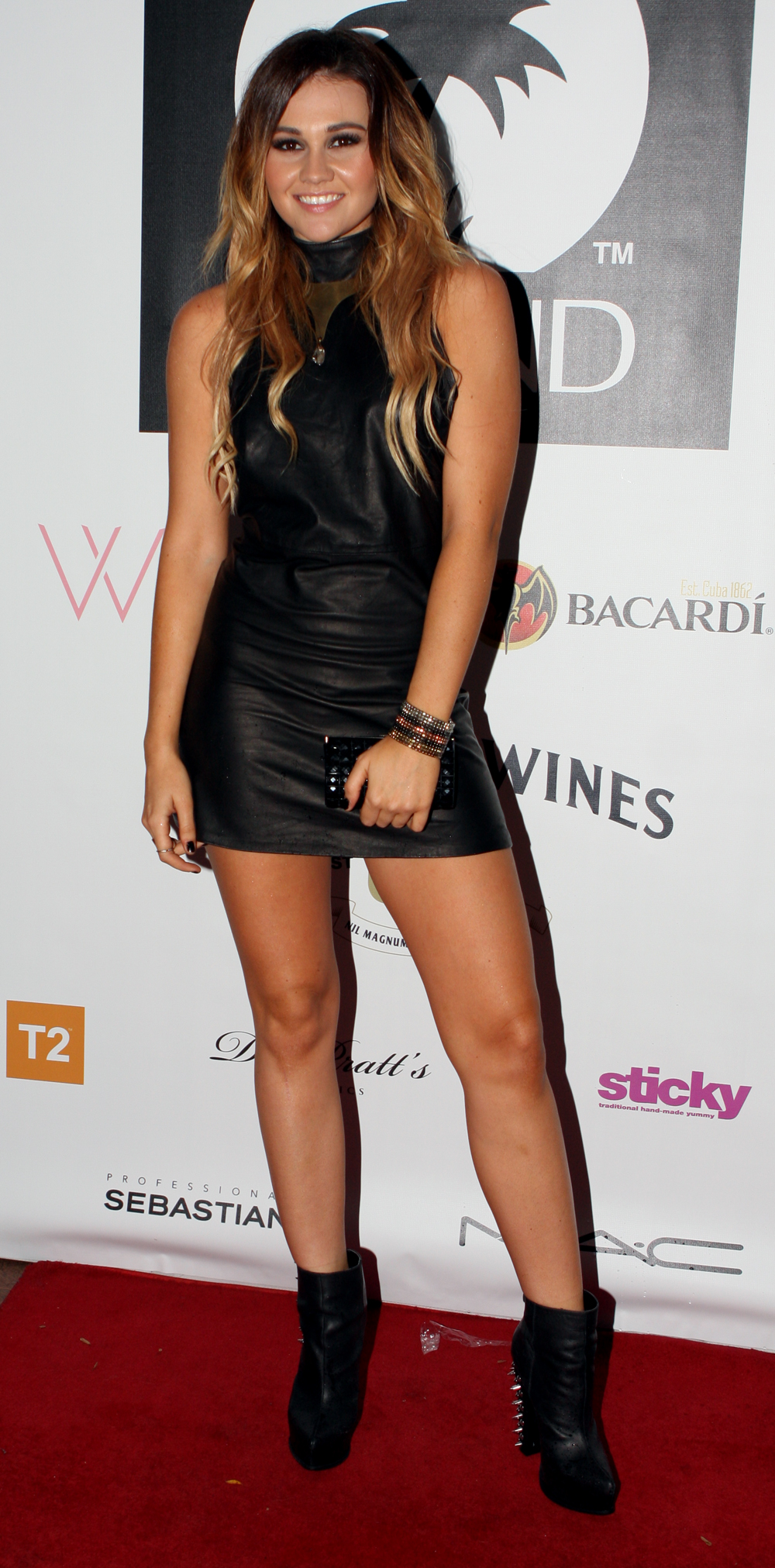
- November, 2012

Background information
- Born: 10 November 1990 (age 36); Queensland, Australia
- Genres: Pop, rock, Country,
- Instruments: Vocals, keyboards, guitar, harmonica
- Years active: 2007–present
- Label: Island Records Australia

Sinead Burgess (born 10 November 1990) is a Sydney-based singer-songwriter signed to ABC Music and Island Records Australia, which is part of Universal Music Australia. Burgess first began her singing career in 2007 and subsequently released a 5-track EP titled You Get Me; featuring the title track and "Butterflies" which were released as singles and in many compilation albums across Australia. Burgess's single "Goodnight America" was co-written with UK pop producer Stuart Crichton who has worked with Kylie Minogue, Pet Shop Boys, Bond and The Sugababes. Burgess supported Irish band The Script at a one-off show in Sydney in 2012.

Burgess released her single "Rearview Mirrow" digitally in 2013 and then worked on a 6-Track EP titled Wolf, released as a digital download in 2016. Burgess since toured with The Shires (duo) on their Accidentally On Purpose tour as a support act.

She released the album Damaged Goods on 17 August 2018.

== Discography ==
=== Albums ===
List of EPs, with selected details
Title	Details
Damaged Goods	Released: 17 August 2018; Format: CD, digital; Label: Sinead Burgess

=== Extended plays ===
List of EPs, with selected details
Title	Details
You Get Me	Released: 2009; Format: CD, digital; Label: ABC Music (1795234)
Wolf	Released: March 2016; Format: digital; Label: ABC Music
