= My Universe Tour =

2016–17 concert tour by the Shires

- Tour by The Shires
- Associated album: My Universe
- Start date: 18 November 2016
- End date: 2 May 2017
- Legs: 2
- No. of shows: 28 in United Kingdom

The Shires concert chronology
- UK Tour 2015; My Universe Tour; Accidentally on Purpose Tour

In support of their second studio album, My Universe, the English country music duo the Shires embarked on a seventeen-date UK tour in November and December 2016. In December 2016, the duo announced a second leg of the tour for the spring of 2017.

== Set list ==
The following is the set list is of the 11 December show in London at O2 Shepherd's Bush Empire and represents the set list for the first leg of the tour:

1. "Nashville Grey Skies"
2. "My Universe"
3. "Drive"
4. "Naked"
5. "Angels" (Robbie Williams cover)
6. "All Over Again"
7. "Not Even Drunk Right Now"
8. "Beats to Your Rhythm"
9. "Save Me"
10. "Daddy's Little Girl"
11. "Brave"
12. "State Lines"
13. "Friday Night"
14. "Jekyll and Hyde"
15. "I Just Wanna Love You"
16. "Tonight"

Encore:

1. "Made in England"
2. "Other People's Things"
3. "A Thousand Hallelujahs"

The set list of the 2 May show in London at The London Palladium is representative of the second leg of the tour:

1. "Nashville Grey Skies"
2. "State Lines"
3. "Daddy's Little Girl"
4. "Only Midnight"
5. "Friday Night"
6. "Beats to Your Rhythm"
7. "Made in England"
8. "My Universe"
9. "Islands in the Stream" (Bee Gees cover)
10. "Other People's Things"
11. "A Thousand Hallelujahs"
12. "Jekyll and Hyde"
13. "Black and White"
14. "Naked"
15. "Angels" (Robbie Williams cover)
16. "Save Me"
17. "All Over Again"
18. "Drive"

== Tour dates ==
Date	City	Country	Venue
First leg
18 November 2016	Oxford	England	O_{2} Academy Oxford
20 November 2016	Basingstoke	England	The Anvil, Basingstoke
21 November 2016	Southampton	England	Southampton Guildhall
23 November 2016	Northampton	England	Royal & Derngate
24 November 2016	Cardiff	Wales	St David's Hall
25 November 2016	Bedford	England	Corn Exchange, Bedford
27 November 2016	Cambridge	England	Cambridge Corn Exchange
28 November 2016	Bristol	England	Colston Hall
29 November 2016	Brighton	England	Brighton Dome
2 December 2016	Llandudno	Wales	Venue Cymru
3 December 2016	Birmingham	England	O_{2} Academy Birmingham
4 December 2016	Manchester	England	Bridgewater Hall
5 December 2016	Gateshead	England	Sage Gateshead
7 December 2016	Glasgow	Scotland	O_{2} ABC Glasgow
8 December 2016	York	England	Barbican
9 December 2016	Liverpool	England	O_{2} Academy Liverpool
11 December 2016	London	England	O_{2} Shepherd's Bush Empire
Second leg
18 April 2017	Blackpool	England	Blackpool Opera House
19 April 2017	Aberdeen	Scotland	Beach Ballroom
20 April 2017	Edinburgh	Scotland	Usher Hall
23 April 2017	Bournemouth	England	Pavilion Theatre
24 April 2017	Guildford	England	G Live
25 April 2017	Coventry	England	Warwick Arts Centre
27 April 2017	Southend-on-Sea	England	Cliffs Pavilion
28 April 2017	Folkestone	England	Leas Cliff Hall
30 April 2017	Nottingham	England	Nottingham Royal Concert Hall
1 May 2017	Ipswich	England	Regent Theatre
2 May 2017	London	England	London Palladium
