= Bury Me in My Boots =

Studio album by The Cadillac Three
- Released: August 5, 2016
- Genre: Country
- Label: Big Machine
- Producers: The Cadillac Three; Dann Huff; Justin Niebank

The Cadillac Three chronology
The Cadillac Three (2012)	Bury Me in My Boots (2016)	Legacy (2017)

Bury Me in My Boots is the second studio album by American country rock band The Cadillac Three. It was released on August 5, 2016, via Big Machine Records. The album includes the singles "The South", "Party Like You", and "White Lightning".

== Critical reception ==
Stephen Thomas Erlewine criticized the more novelty-driven numbers and occasional influence of bro-country, but praised the band's Southern rock influences.

== Track listing ==
No.	Title	Writer(s)	Length
1.	"Bury Me in My Boots"	Jaren Johnston, Neil Mason, Kelby Ray Caldwell	3:52
2.	"Slide"	Johnston, Mason, Lindsay Rimes	2:35
3.	"Drunk Like You"	Johnston, Mason, Jesse Frasure	3:30
4.	"Graffiti"	Mason, Luke Dick, Corey Crowder	3:14
5.	"Buzzin'"	Johnston, Luke Laird	3:55
6.	"Party Like You"	Johnston, Jimmy Robbins, Jon Nite	3:07
7.	"Ship Faced"	Brent Anderson, Jerrod Niemann, Johnston	3:15
8.	"Soundtrack to a Six Pack"	Johnston, Mason, Benjamin Cashatt	3:35
9.	"White Lightning"	Johnston	2:58
10.	"The South" (featuring Dierks Bentley, Florida Georgia Line, and Mike Eli)	Johnston	4:36
11.	"This Accent"	Johnston, Mason, Robbins	3:54
12.	"Peace Love & Dixie"	Johnston, Mason, Ryan Hurd	2:41
13.	"Hot Damn"	Andrew Dorff, Johnston, Mason, Caldwell	3:04
14.	"Runnin' Red Lights"	Johnston, Mason	3:06

== Personnel ==
From Bury Me in My Boots liner notes and backing card.

The Cadillac Three

- Kelby Ray Caldwell - background vocals, bass guitar, lap steel guitar
- Jaren Johnston - lead vocals, guitar; banjo (track 9), ganjo (track 4), keyboards (track 4), programming (track 4)
- Neil Mason - drums, percussion

Additional musicians

- Dierks Bentley - background vocals (track 10)
- Mike Eli - background vocals (track 10)
- Florida Georgia Line - background vocals (track 10)
- Ryan Gore - programming (track 4)
- Dann Huff - electric guitar (track 10), bouzouki (track 10)

Technical

- Drew Bollman - recording (tracks 1, 5, 6, 7, 8, 10)
- The Cadillac Three - producer (tracks 2, 4, 7, 11, 12, 13)
- Ryan Gore - recording (tracks 2, 4, 7, 11, 12, 13), mixing (tracks 12, 13)
- Mark Hagen - recording (track 3)
- Dann Huff - producer (tracks 1, 3, 5, 6, 8, 9, 10, 14)
- Andrew Mendelson - mastering
- Seth Morton - recording (tracks 1, 5, 6, 7, 8, 10)
- Sean Neff - digital editing (10)
- Justin Niebank - producer (tracks 1, 3, 5, 6, 8, 9, 10, 14), recording (1, 5, 6, 7, 8, 10, 14), mixing (all tracks except 12 and 13)
- Jarod Snowden - digital editing (track 4)

== Charts ==
Album

Chart (2016)	Peak position
US Billboard 200	34
US Top Country Albums (Billboard)	5

Singles

Year	Single	Peak chart positions		Sales
Year	Single	US Country	US Country Airplay	Sales
2013	"The South" (featuring Florida Georgia Line, Dierks Bentley, and Mike Eli)	32	33	US: 165,000
2014	"Party Like You"	48	43	
2015	"White Lightning"	39	38	US: 100,000
