= The Cadillac Three (album) =

Studio album by The Cadillac Three
- Released: April 17, 2012
- Genres: Country Rock, Southern Rock
- Length: 38:52
- Labels: Nobody Buys Records, Big Machine Records
- Producers: The Cadillac Three, Dave Cobb

The Cadillac Three chronology
The Cadillac Three (2012)	I'm Southern (EP) (2014)

Alternate Covers
- Original cover

Alternative cover
- Updated cover

Alternative cover
- European cover

Alternative cover
- European reissue

The Cadillac Three (originally known as The Cadillac Black) is the debut studio album by American country rock band The Cadillac Three, initially released on April 17, 2012 via Nobody Buys Records. Due to the band's decision to change their name and signing to major label Big Machine Records, the album has been reissued several times (see the various different covers). It was reissued on the Big Machine label on May 7, 2013. In Europe, the album was released as Tennessee Mojo with bonus tracks.

The band produced the album itself, with assistance from Dave Cobb on "Tennessee Mojo" and "Whiskey Soaked Redemption". It has sold 40,000 copies in the United States as of July 2016.

== Track listing ==
No.	Title	Writer(s)	Length
1.	"I'm Southern"	Jaren Johnston	3:09
2.	"Tennessee Mojo"	Corey Crowder, Johnston, Neil Mason	3:33
3.	"Get Your Buzz"	Kelby Ray Caldwell, Johnston, Mason	3:12
4.	"Back It Up"	Rodney Clawson, Johnston, Mason	3:42
5.	"Down to the River"	Matt Fleener, Ryan Fleener, Johnston	4:23
6.	"Days of Gold"	Johnston, Mason	4:44
7.	"Turn It On"	Johnston, Jeffrey Steele	3:21
8.	"I'm Rockin'"	Caldwell, Johnston, Mason	2:54
9.	"Life"	Johnston	3:01
10.	"The Sticks"	Johnston	3:30
11.	"Whiskey Soaked Redemption"	Johnston	3:30
Total length:			38:52

Tennessee Mojo edition
No.	Title	Length
12.	"White Lightning" (acoustic)	3:13

Tennessee Mojo reissue
No.	Title	Length
13.	"The South" (featuring Dierks Bentley, Florida Georgia Line and Mike Eli)	3:33
14.	"I'm Southern" (Hot Sauce Mix)	3:09

== Chart performance ==
Chart (2014)	Peak position
US Heatseekers Albums (Billboard)	19
