= American Bang =

- Origin: Nashville, Tennessee, U.S.
- Genres: Southern rock
- Years active: 2005–2011
- Label: Warner Bros. Records
- Spinoffs: The Cadillac Three
- Spinoff of: Llama
- Past members: Ben Brown; Neil Mason; Jaren Johnston; Kelby Ray

American Bang was an American southern rock band from Nashville, Tennessee. The group was founded by two former members of Llama and one of the Kicks, along with a fourth member, in 2005. They initially formed under the name Bang Bang Bang and self-released an album under this name in 2005, but after signing to Warner Bros. Records in 2006, they changed their name to American Bang after finding out another band of the same name already existed. Their first EP under the new name arrived in 2007, and a new full-length was issued in 2010. Their song "Wild and Young" was the theme song of WWE's show WWE NXT. It was also used in the 2010 animated film Alpha and Omega and in the season one finale of the television show Greek.

The band's lead guitarist, Ben Brown has now left, and the remaining trio have formed a similar band called The Cadillac Three.

== Members ==
- Ben Brown - lead guitar
- Neil Mason - drums
- Jaren Johnston - vocals, guitar
- Kelby Ray - bass, backing vocals

== Discography ==
=== Studio albums ===
- I Shot the King (2005) [released under the band name Bang Bang Bang]
- American Bang (Reprise, 2010)

=== Extended plays ===
- Move to the Music EP (2007)

=== Singles ===
Year	Single	Peak positions			Album
Year	Single	US Alt.	US Main.	US Rock	Album
2010	"Wild and Young"	24	20	26	American Bang
2010	"Whiskey Walk"	—	32	—	American Bang
