= Llama (band) =

American band

- Llama

Background information
- Origin: Nashville, Tennessee, United States
- Genre: Rock
- Years active: 1996–2003
- Label: MCA Records
- Past members: Ben Brown; Neil Mason; Ben Morton; Adam Binder; Ian Fitchuk

Llama was an American alternative rock band from Nashville, Tennessee. Formed by high school friends Ben Brown, Neil Mason, Ben Morton, and Matthew Stewart, they were discovered while playing a concert in a local pizzeria. Then called the Dahlia Llamas, they were signed to a contract with MCA Records and changed their name to Llama while the three original members of the band were still in high school.

== History ==
The band's first album, Close to the Silence, was recorded over two years as the members completed high school. Upon its release in 2001 it garnered critical comparisons to the Dave Matthews Band. Llama spent the majority of 2001 touring with acts as varied as Béla Fleck, O.A.R., and Blueground Undergrass. Their second release, the EP The World from Here, was released in 2002.

Llama broke up in 2003, but the former members are still active in the Nashville music scene. Neil Mason and Ben Brown combined with former members of The Kicks to form the band Bang Bang Bang (later renamed American Bang and signed to Warner Bros. Records). Ben Morton now plays in Nashville-based rock band Cougar Fight; Ian Fitchuk has formed a partnership with fellow musician Justin Loucks, and Adam Binder has toured with Eliot Morris and is currently playing bass in Nashville-based singer-songwriter Jeremy Lister's band. Neil Mason along with other members of American Bang formed The Cadillac Three.

== Members ==
- Ben Brown (guitar)
- Neil Mason (drums)
- Ben Morton (vocals, acoustic guitar)
- Adam Binder (bass)
- Ian Fitchuk (keyboards)

== Discography ==
=== Albums ===
- Close to the Silence, 2001, MCA Records

=== EPs ===
- The World from Here, 2002, MCA Records

== General references ==
- The Pitch Interview with Ben Morton, 2001
- The Daily Gamecock Interview with the band, 2001
