= Legacy (The Cadillac Three album) =

Studio album by The Cadillac Three
- Released: August 25, 2017
- Length: 34:26
- Label: Big Machine
- Producer: The Cadillac Three

The Cadillac Three chronology
Bury Me in My Boots (2016)	Legacy (2017)	Country Fuzz (2020)

Legacy is the third studio album by American country band The Cadillac Three. It was released on August 25, 2017 under Big Machine Records.

== Critical reception ==
Professional ratings
Review scores
Source	Rating
AllMusic	4/5 stars
Louder Sound	3.5/5 stars

The album received four out of five stars from Stephen Thomas Erlewine of AllMusic. He said “The Cadillac Three do spend a fair amount of time celebrating good old country music on Legacy -- they pledge allegiance to "Hank & Jesus" and declare "Ain't That Country" -- but the reason the record works is because they attack all this material from the stance of a working band, turning this into a tight and tough album that wears its swagger with a smile.”

== Critical performance ==
The album has sold 7,700 copies in the United States as of October 2017. It debuted at No. 14 on Billboard's Top Country Albums on September 16, 2017. On 1 September 2017, the album debuted at No. 16 on the UK Country Albums.

== Track listing ==
No.	Title	Length
1.	"Cadillacin’"	3:09
2.	"Tennessee"	2:33
3.	"Hank & Jesus"	3:52
4.	"Dang If We Didn’t"	2:59
5.	"Ain’t That Country"	3:30
6.	"American Slang"	3:07
7.	"Take Me to the Bottom"	3:11
8.	"Long Hair Don’t Care"	2:43
9.	"Love Me Like Liquor (featuring Lori McKenna)"	3:07
10.	"Demolition Man"	3:02
11.	"Legacy"	3:15

== Charts ==
Chart performance for Legacy
Chart (2017)	Peak position
US Billboard 200	120
US Top Country Albums (Billboard)	14
UK Albums (Official Charts)	16
