= Days of Gold (song) =

2012 song by Jake Owen

Song by The Cadillac Three

from the album The Cadillac Three
- Genre: Country
- Length: 4:44
- Songwriters: Jaren Johnston; Neil Mason
- Producer: The Cadillac Three

"Days of Gold"

Single by Jake Owen

from the album Days of Gold
- Released: August 12, 2013
- Recorded: 2013
- Genre: Country
- Length: 3:21
- Label: RCA Nashville
- Songwriters: Jaren Johnston; Neil Mason
- Producer: Joey Moi

Jake Owen singles chronology
"Anywhere with You" (2013)	"Days of Gold" (2013)	"Beachin'" (2014)

"Days of Gold" is a song written by Jaren Johnston and Neil Mason, two-thirds of the American country music group The Cadillac Three, and originally recorded by them on their 2012 self-titled debut album. It was covered by American country music artist Jake Owen. It was released in August 2013 as the first single and title track from his fourth studio album of the same name. The song, about the singer's description of a summer night, garnered positive reviews from critics.

"Days of Gold" peaked at No. 15 and No. 19 on both the Billboard Country Airplay and Hot Country Songs charts respectively. It also reached No. 83 on the Hot 100 chart. The song also charted in Canada, reaching No. 28 on the Canada Country chart. A music video, directed by Mason Dixon, was created for the single.

== Critical reception ==
Billy Dukes of Taste of Country gave the song four and a half stars out of five, saying that "‘Days of Gold’ isn’t a song, it’s a statement. It’s a show-closer, and if Owen’s new album comes with songs that match this authority, he’ll be soon closing shows for much larger audiences." Giving it an "A", Tammy Ragusa of Country Weekly said that it "has an in-your-face grit and texture that suits his natural vocal and endless energy." She also wrote that the lyrics are "less about a season and more an about an attitude" and "[take] a less overt approach while still staying true to a rural lifestyle."

== Music video ==
The music video was directed by Mason Dixon and premiered in September 2013.

== Chart performance ==
"Days of Gold" debuted at number 48 on the U.S. Billboard Country Airplay chart for the week of August 17, 2013, and debuted at number 37 on the U.S. Billboard Hot Country Songs chart for the week of August 24, 2013. It also debuted at number 91 on the U.S. Billboard Hot 100 chart for the week of October 26, 2013.

Chart (2013)	Peak position
Canada Country (Billboard)	28
US Billboard Hot 100	83
US Country Airplay (Billboard)	15
US Hot Country Songs (Billboard)	19

=== Year-end charts ===
Chart (2013)	Position
US Country Airplay (Billboard)	71
US Hot Country Songs (Billboard)	81
