= Country Fuzz =

Studio album by The Cadillac Three
- Released: February 7, 2020
- Length: 46:55
- Label: Big Machine
- Producers: The Cadillac Three (all tracks except 6), Dann Huff (track 6)

The Cadillac Three chronology
Legacy (2017)	Country Fuzz (2020)	Tabasco and Sweet Tea (2020)

Country Fuzz (stylized as COUNTRY FUZZ) is the fourth studio album by American country band The Cadillac Three. It was released on February 7, 2020 under Big Machine Records.

== Critical reception ==
Professional ratings
Aggregate scores
Source	Rating
Metacritic	79/100
Review scores
Source	Rating
AllMusic	4/5 stars
Louder Sound	4/5 stars
Spectrum Culture	2.5/5 stars

Country Fuzz was met with generally favorable reviews from critics. At Metacritic, which assigns a weighted average rating out of 100 to reviews from mainstream publications, this release received an average score of 79, based on 4 reviews.

== Commercial performance ==
The album has sold 5,900 copies in the United States as of March 2020. It debuted at No. 17 on Billboard's Top Country Albums on February 22, 2020. On 14 February 2020, the album debuted at No. 1 on the UK Country Albums.

== Track listing ==
Country Fuzz track listing
No.	Title	Length
1.	"Bar Round Here"	2:34
2.	"The Jam"	3:10
3.	"Hard Out Here for a Country Boy" (featuring Chris Janson & Travis Tritt)	3:28
4.	"Slow Rollin'"	2:44
5.	"All the Makin's of a Saturday Night"	1:53
6.	"Crackin' Cold Ones With the Boys"	2:34
7.	"Labels"	3:04
8.	"Raise Hell"	2:54
9.	"Back Home"	3:15
10.	"Dirt Road Nights"	3:11
11.	"Blue El Camino"	2:09
12.	"Jack Daniels' Heart"	3:47
13.	"Why Ya Gotta Go Out Like That"	2:30
14.	"Heat"	3:08
15.	"Whiskey and Smoke"	3:08
16.	"Long After Last Call"	3:22

== Personnel ==
Adapted from AllMusic

=== The Cadillac Three ===
- Kelby Ray Caldwell - dobro, lap steel guitar
- Jaren Johnston - banjo, bass guitar, beat box, dobro, acoustic guitar, electric guitar, resonator guitar, percussion, programming, lead vocals, background vocals
- Neil Mason - clapping, drums, percussion, programming

=== Additional Musicians ===
- Dann Huff - bouzouki, resonator guitar, mandolin, piano, programming, tambourine
- Chris Janson - harmonica and vocals on "Hard Out Here for a Country Boy"
- Justin Niebank - programming
- F. Reid Shippen - programming
- Travis Tritt - vocals on "Hard Out Here for a Country Boy"
- Alex Wright - banjo, Hammond B-3 organ

== Charts ==
Chart performance for Country Fuzz
Chart (2020)	Peak position
Scottish Albums (Official Charts)	8
UK Albums (Official Charts)	30
UK Country Albums (Official Charts)	1
US Billboard 200	172
US Top Country Albums (Billboard)	17
