= The Guest Room (album) =

Studio album by Jaren Johnston
- Released: November 13, 2026
- Genre: Country rock
- Label: Blue Highway Records
- Producer: Jaren Johnston

Singles from The Guest Room
- 1. "Tear Me Up" Released: August 21, 2026; 2. "Ridin', Drinkin', Kissin'" Released: September 18, 2026; 3. "Lower" Released: October 9, 2026; 4. "Call Me When Ya Don't" Released: October 23, 2026

The Guest Room is the debut studio album by American country musician Jaren Johnston, released on November 13, 2026, through Blue Highway Records.

== Track listing ==
The Guest Room track listing

No.	Title	Writer(s)	Length
1.	"Tear Me Up"	Johnston; Rodney Clawson	4:07
2.	"Ride Around"	Johnston; Justin Ebach; Jordan Schmidt	4:47
3.	"Lower"	Johnston; Ross Copperman; Matt Jenkins	2:33
4.	"Make Yourself At Home"	Johnston; Clawson; Schmidt; Brett Tyler	3:29
5.	"Memories Like You"	Johnston; David Garcia; Hillary Lindsey	2:26
6.	"Hotter"	Johnston; Corey Crowder; Alysa Marie Vanderheym	2:55
7.	"Two Hearts And A Chevy"	Johnston; Tyler Filmore; Jake Rose	3:12
8.	"Need Ya Tonight"	Johnston	3:28
9.	"Ridin', Drinkin', Kissin'"	Johnston; Daniel Breland; Zachary Kale	3:02
10.	"My Kind Of Crazy"	Johnston; Bob DiPiero	3:09
11.	"Call Me When Ya Don't"	Johnston; Chris DeStefano; Bobby Pinson	3:09
12.	"Cigarette"	Johnston; Kip Moore; Stapleton	3:17
13.	"Fire Works"	Johnston; Josh Kear; Jon Nite; Jimmy Robbins	3:06
