= TCA Volleyball =

Volleyball club

The Team Complete Athlete Volleyball Club is a multi-state volleyball club. The club operates in many U.S. states, such as Texas, California, and Virginia.

== History ==
TCA Volleyball Club was created by Neil Mason in 2000. TCA has won 3 National Championships. In 2004, they won the 17-Open National Championship. TCA’s win marked the first ever-gold medal by TCA at the Junior Olympics.

In 2006, Taylor Carico led her team to Gold in the 18-Open National Championship. After only 5 years in existence, TCA won its second gold medal and placed first in the 18-Open Division. TCA became the only club in Southern California to ever win gold in the 18’s and 17’s Open Division.

In 2007, they were the National Bronze Medalist in the 17-Open Division.

In 2008, they won the 18-Open National Championship.

In 2009, they were the National Silver Medalists in the 16-Open Division.

== Location ==
TCA club operates in many states, including Texas, California, Maryland, Virginia, Pennsylvania, Connecticut, Colorado, Georgia, and Ohio.

== Notable alumni ==
Alumnus	College
Morgan Boukather	Stanford
Kelly Russell	Columbia University
Jessica Hoffmann	Princeton
Rachel Moss	Duke
Taylor Carico	USC
Stephanie King	UCLA
Lilla Frederick	Pepperdine

== Founder ==
Neil Mason was born in Toronto Canada in 1977. He was named the top player in Ontario Canada in 1995. Neil played for Canada's Junior National Team. He earned a full scholarship from California State University Long Beach and was named Collegiate All American in 1999. Off the court, Neil has coached for Team USA and won 3 Junior Olympic Open Gold Medals. In 2006, Coach Mason was awarded the United States Olympic Committee Coach of the Year. Neil Mason is the co-author of The Blueprint of a Champion, which features articles from some of the greatest volleyball players of all time such as Karch Kiraly, Misty May, and Kerry Walsh.
