= Jaren Johnston =

American singer-songwriter (born 1980)

- Songwriter/ Member of The Cadillac Three

Background information
- Born: October 4, 1980 (age 46)
- Origin: Nashville, Tennessee, U.S.
- Genres: Southern rock, Country, Rock, Country Rock
- Occupation: Singer-songwriter
- Instruments: Vocals, guitar
- Years active: 2005–present
- Member of: The Cadillac Three
- Formerly of: American Bang

Jaren Ray Johnston (born October 4, 1980) is an American country music and rock singer and songwriter. He is a member of the group the Cadillac Three.

== Career ==
Jaren is a multiple time Grammy nominated songwriter and producer. Johnston was formerly the vocalist and guitarist in the Rock band American Bang. After American Bang disbanded, he and two of its other members formed a second band originally called Cadillac Black, which was renamed to The Cadillac Three. Johnston released a self-produced solo album, The Guest Room, through Blue High Records in November 2026.

Johnston has also had 9 number one’s with other artists. They include: "You Gonna Fly" and “Raise 'Em Up” by Keith Urban, "Southern Girl" and “Meanwhile Back at Mama's” by Tim McGraw, "Tippin' Point" by Dallas Smith, and "Days of Gold" and "Beachin'" by Jake Owen” .

== Personal life ==
Johnston is married to Evyn Mustoe Johnston, who is also in the music industry. They have a son named Jude.

Johnston's father, Jerry Ray Johnston, was drummer in the country band Bandana. Jerry Ray Johnston died on January 9, 2022.

== Singles ==
Song title	Artist	Co-writers	Peak
"American Country Love Song"	Jake Owen	Ross Copperman, Ashley Gorley	1
"Beachin'"	Jake Owen	Jon Nite, Jimmy Robbins	1
"Cigarette"	Frankie Ballard	Chris Stapleton, Kip Moore	50
"CRZY"	Dallas Smith	Travis Meadows, Stephen Wilson Jr.	—
"Days of Gold"	Jake Owen	Neil Mason	15
"Don't It"	Billy Currington	Ross Copperman, Ashley Gorley	1
"Drunk Like You"	The Cadillac Three	Neil Mason, Jesse Frasure	–
"It All Started With A Beer"	Frankie Ballard	Neil Mason, Jeremy Stover	15
"Kinda Dig the Feeling"	The Railers	Tom Douglas, Tyler Bryant	50
"Livin' the Dream"	Drake White	Tom Douglas, Luke Laird	12
"Meanwhile Back at Mama's"	Tim McGraw	Tom Douglas, Jeffrey Steele	2
"Party Like You"	The Cadillac Three	Jon Nite, Jimmy Robbins	46
"Raise 'Em Up"	Keith Urban feat. Eric Church	Tom Douglas, Jeffrey Steele	1
"The South"	The Cadillac Three		32
"Tippin' Point"	Dallas Smith	Brian Kelley, Tyler Hubbard	—
"Some Songs"	Terri Clark	Tom Douglas, James T. Slater	—
"Southern Girl"	Tim McGraw	Rodney Clawson, Lee Thomas Miller	2
"Sunshine & Whiskey"	Frankie Ballard	Luke Laird	1
"White Lightning"	The Cadillac Three		44
"You Are What You Love"	Kelleigh Bannen	Jenn Schott, Kelleigh Bannen	59
"You Gonna Fly"	Keith Urban	Preston Brust, Chris Lucas	1
"Young in America"	Danielle Bradbery	Kylie Sackley, Whitney Duncan	50
"Young Buck"	Ronnie Dunn	Jeremy Stover	-

== Associated Act Cuts ==
Band	Song
American Bang
American Bang	"Whiskey walk"
American Bang	"Wild and Young"
American Bang	"Rewind"
American Bang	"Angels"
American Bang	"She Don't Cry No More"
American Bang	"Hurts like Hell"
American Bang	"All We Know"
American Bang	"Wouldn't Want To Be You"
American Bang	"A Man Can Change"
American Bang	"Other Side of You"
American Bang	"Roll On
American Bang	"Christmas Song"
American Bang	"Move to the Music"
The Cadillac Three
The Cadillac Three	"I'm Southern"
The Cadillac Three	"White Lightning"
The Cadillac Three	"Whiskey Soaked Redemption"
The Cadillac Three	"The Sticks"
The Cadillac Three	"Life"
The Cadillac Three	"I'm Rockin'"
The Cadillac Three	"Turn It On"
The Cadillac Three	"Drunk Like You"

== Album Cuts ==
Artist	Song	Album
A Thousand Horses	"Suicide Eyes"	Footloose Soundtrack
Billy Currington	"Summer Forever"	Summer Forever
Canaan Smith	"Stompin' Grounds"	Bronco
Canaan Smith	"Love At First"	Bronco
Casey James	"She’s Money"	Casey James
Cavo	"Last Days"	Cavo
Dallas Smith	"CRZY"	Dallas Smith
Danielle Bradbery	"Hello Summer"	I Don't Believe We've Met
David Nail	"I’m A Fire"	I'm A Fire
Dierks Bentley	"Back Porch"	Riser
Dierks Bentley	"Damn These Dreams"	Riser
Dierks Bentley	"Grab A Beer"	Country & Cold Cans
Dierks Bentley	"The Woods"	Home
Easton Corbin	"Guys and Girls"	About To Get Real
Frankie Ballard	"Drinkey Drink"	Sunshine & Whiskey
Frankie Ballard	"Sunshine & Whiskey"	Sunshine & Whiskey
Frankie Ballard	"Cigarette"	El Rio
Frankie Ballard	"Sweet Time"	El Rio
Hiphi	"Radio"	Nothing More To Say
Jack's Mannequin	"Television"	People and Things
Jake Owen	"1972"	Days of Gold
Jake Owen	"After the Music’s Stopped"	Days of Gold
Jake Owen	"Sure Feels Right"	Days of Gold
Jake Owen	"Tall Glass of Something"	Days of Gold
Josh Thompson	"Hillbilly Limo"	Turn It Up
Keith Urban	"Black Leather Jacket"	Fuse
Keith Urban	"Raise ‘Em Up"	Fuse
Keith Urban	"You Gonna Fly"	Get Closer
Kenny Chesney	"Sing ‘Em Good My Friend"	Welcome to the Fishbowl
Leslie	"Devil Ain’t Ready Yet"	The Rebel Soul EP
Lonestar	"The Countdown"	Life As We Know It
Loverboy	"Heartbreaker"	Rock 'n' Roll Revival
Loverboy	"No Tomorrow in Yesterday"	Rock 'n' Roll Revival
Lynyrd Skynyrd	"Mississippi Blood"	Last of a Dyin' Breed
Mat and Savanna Shaw	“We Can Be”	Just How Strong You Are
Meatloaf	"If It Rains"	Hang Cool Teddy Bear
New Medicine	"We are the Fire"	Race You to the Bottom
Rascal Flatts	"The Mechanic"	Rewind
Sara Evans	"Anywhere"	Stronger
Steven Tyler	"We're All Somebody from Somewhere"	We're All Somebody from Somewhere
Terri Clark	"Some Songs"	Some Songs
Three Days Grace	"Sign of the Times"	Transit of Venus
Tim McGraw	"Two Lanes of Freedom"	Two Lanes of Freedom
Tyler Bryant	"Cold Heart"	Wild Child
Tyler Bryant	"House that Jack Built"	Wild Child
Tyler Bryant	"Lipstick Wonder Woman"	Wild Child
Tyler Bryant	"Still Young"	Wild Child
Tyler Bryant	"You Got Me Baby"	Wild Child
