= The Cadillac Three =

American Southern rock band

- Also known as: The Cadillac Black
- Origin: Nashville, Tennessee, U.S.
- Genres: Southern rock; hard rock; country rock
- Years active: 2011–present
- Label: Big Machine
- Spinoff of: American Bang
- Members: Jaren Johnston; Neil Mason; Kelby Ray
- Website: www.thecadillacthree.com
- Logo
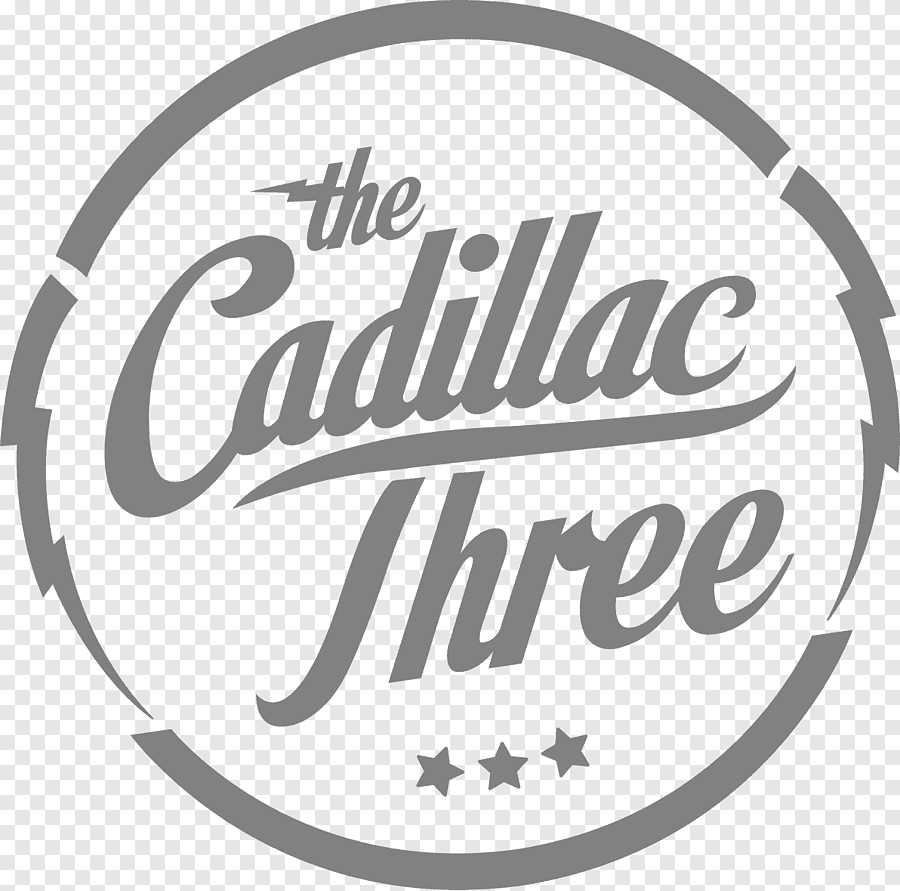

The Cadillac Three, originally known as The Cadillac Black, is an American southern rock band consisting of Jaren Johnston (lead vocals, guitar), Kelby Ray (lap steel guitar, bass guitar, vocals), and Neil Mason (drums, vocals). All three members were originally in the band American Bang. The group has released five albums through Big Machine Records, and has charted three singles on the Hot Country Songs and Country Airplay charts. In addition to their own work, Johnston has written singles for Keith Urban, Tim McGraw, Steven Tyler, Dallas Smith, and Jake Owen.

== History ==
Before its foundation, all three members were in the group American Bang, which also featured Ben Brown as a fourth member; Mason and Brown had been in the band Llama before that. Between 2011 and 2013, Johnston co-wrote "You Gonna Fly" for Keith Urban, "Southern Girl" for Tim McGraw, and "Days of Gold" for Jake Owen, the last of which was also co-written by Mason.

The group released their debut self-titled album in 2012 (then titled The Cadillac Black). In February 2013, the group signed to Big Machine Records and reissued their album. The album includes their own rendition of "Days of Gold".

In late 2013, the trio released its debut single, "The South." It features guest vocals from Florida Georgia Line, Dierks Bentley, and Eli Young Band lead singer Mike Eli. Billy Dukes of Taste of Country praised the song for its Southern rock influences. The song debuted at number 58 on the Country Airplay charts dated for the week ending December 21, 2013. On January 15, 2014, the group played their song on an episode of Nashville.

In 2015, the band played a show in America on Friday, flew from America to the UK to play Download Festival on Saturday and ended up hitting the stage using fellow American band Black Stone Cherry's equipment as TC3's had not made it to the UK with them. Within hours of their set at Download they were heading back to America for a different festival appearance the following day. On April 23, 2015, the band played on Mane Stage in Long Beach, California.

The band's second album, Bury Me in My Boots, was released on August 5, 2016. It debuted at No. 5 on the Billboard Top Country Albums chart, selling 11,000 copies in the first week.

The band went on their first headlining US tour with Monster Energy Outbreak Presents from January 19 to March 17.

They released their third album, Legacy, on August 25, 2017.

They released their fourth album Country Fuzz on February 7, 2020.

On October 23, 2020, the band released their fifth album Tabasco & Sweet Tea via Big Machine Records.

On April 26, 2021, it was announced that the band would have their own radio show on Planet Rock (radio station) on every Saturday night throughout May 2021 called Garage Radio, which is in celebration of their 10th Anniversary as a band.

On October 27, 2023, they released their sixth album 'The Years Go Fast' on the 'Big Machine' record label.

== Discography ==
=== Studio albums ===
Title	Details	Peak positions			Sales
Title	Details	US	US Country	UK	Sales
The Cadillac Three	Release date: April 17, 2012; Label: Nobody Buys Records, Big Machine	—	—	—	US: 40,000
Bury Me in My Boots	Release date: August 5, 2016; Label: Big Machine	34	5	—	US: 25,800
Legacy	Release date: August 25, 2017; Label: Big Machine	120	14	16	US: 7,700
Country Fuzz	Release date: February 7, 2020; Label: Big Machine	172	17	30	US: 5,900
Tabasco and Sweet Tea	Release date: October 23, 2020; Label: Big Machine	74	—	—	
The Years Go Fast	Release date: October 27, 2023; Label: Big Machine	—	—	—	
"—" denotes releases that did not appear on chart

=== EPs ===
Title	Details	Notes
I'm Southern	Release date: March 16, 2014; Label: Big Machine Records	UK-exclusive digital EP. Contains the original album version of "I'm Southern" as well as three acoustic versions of "Tennessee Mojo", "The South", and "I'm Southern."
Peace, Love & Dixie	Release date: March 23, 2015; Label: Big Machine Records, Spinefarm Records	UK-exclusive EP that was released in support of the band's 2015 tour. Features four new studio and two live tracks.

=== Singles ===
Year	Single	Peak chart positions		Sales	Certifications	Album
Year	Single	US Country	US Country Airplay	Sales	Certifications	Album
2013	"The South" (featuring Florida Georgia Line, Dierks Bentley, and Mike Eli)	32	33	US: 165,000	RIAA: Gold	Bury Me in My Boots
2014	"Party Like You"	48	43			Bury Me in My Boots
2015	"White Lightning"	39	38	US: 100,000	RIAA: Gold	Bury Me in My Boots
2016	"Drunk Like You"	—	—			Bury Me in My Boots
2017	"Dang If We Didn't"	—	—			Legacy
2019	"Crackin' Cold Ones with the Boys"	—	—			Country Fuzz

=== Songs ===
- "Days of Gold" (2013)

=== Music videos ===
Year	Video	Director
2013	"Tennessee Mojo"	
2013	"The South"	Shane Drake
2014	"I'm Southern"	
2014	"Party Like You"	Brian Lazzaro
2015	"White Lightning"	David McClister
2016	"Graffiti"	Lyle Lindgren
2017	"Dang If We Didn't"	
2019	"Crackin' Cold Ones with the Boys"	Dylan Rucker

== Awards and nominations ==
Year	Award	Category	Result
2015	ACM Awards	Vocal Event of the Year – "The South" (with Florida Georgia Line, Dierks Bentley, Mike Eli)	Nominated
