= Bonfire (The Shires album) =

Studio album by the Shires
- Released: 3 July 2026
- Length: 38:02
- Label: BMG

The Shires chronology
10 Year Plan (2022)	Bonfire (2026)

Singles from Bonfire
- 1. "Getaway Car" Released: 13 March 2026

Bonfire is the sixth studio album by British country music duo the Shires. The album was released on 3 July 2026 by BMG.

== Background ==
Following the release of 10 Year Plan, the Shires took time off from recording while Earle and Rhodes focused on their respective families, the latter of whom became a mother in September 2022. On 13 March 2026, they announced their first new album in four years, Bonfire, which would be released on 3 July. It was accompanied by the release of lead single "Getaway Car".

== Track listing ==
No.	Title	Length
1.	"Bonfire Song"	2:52
2.	"Getaway Car"	3:15
3.	"Magnetised"	3:09
4.	"House of Cards"	3:13
5.	"Slow Dance"	2:59
6.	"Blink"	3:16
7.	"Watching You Watching Me"	3:23
8.	"Hypocrite"	3:29
9.	"One for the Whiskey"	3:23
10.	"Come Back Around"	2:26
11.	"Sing You Back"	3:22
12.	"A Good Life"	3:08
Total length:		38:02

== Charts ==
Chart performance for Bonfire
Chart (2026)	Peak position
Scottish Albums (Official Charts)	6
UK Albums (Official Charts)	28
UK Country Albums (Official Charts)	1
