= Neil Mason =

American volleyball coach

Current position
- Title: Head coach
- Team: TCA
- Conference: Big Ten
- Record: 0-0 (–)

Biographical details
- Born: March 9, 1977 (age 49); Ontario, Canada

Playing career
- 1996-2000: Long Beach State
- Position: Outside Hitter

Coaching career (HC unless noted)
- 2000-2005: US
- 2005-2009: USA
- 2009-Present: US (Director of Volleyball Operations)

Neil Mason (born March 9, 1977) is an American volleyball coach at the TCA Volleyball (2000–present).

== Personal life ==
Mason was born in Ontario, Canada, and received his degree from California State University of Long Beach in 2000.

== Playing career ==
Mason spent his college career playing for the 49ers of Long Beach State as a scholarship athlete Neil played for Coach Alan Knipe. Graduating with a bachelor's degree in 2000, Mason was an Academic All American, a President Ambassador, and a member of the Presidential List while at the Beach. Along with his academic successes, Mason was also successful on the court as part of the 1999 Men's Volleyball Team that went on to be runners-up in the NCAA National Championship that year.

== Coaching career ==
Mason started coaching at TCA in 2000.

Following his time with TCA Volleyball, Mason did work with the USA Volleyball High Performance Team from 2005 to 2010 under the tutelage of Doug Beal.

In 2010, Mason left team USA to return to do developing young talent in club volleyball.

=== Head coaching record ===
Record table
Season	Team	Overall	Conference	Standing	Postseason
TCA (N/A) (2000–present)
2004	TCA	0-0	0-0	N/A	N/A
TCA:		0-0	0-0		
Total:		0-0			

=== Honors ===
TCA has won 3 National Championships. In 2004, they won the 17-Open National Championship.

In 2006, Lilla Frederick lead her team to Gold in the 18-Open National Championship. In only 5 years in existence, TCA volleyball club wins its second gold medal and 1st in the 18-Open Division.

In 2007, they were the National Bronze Medalist in the 17-Open Division

In 2008, the U.S Women's Junior National Team wins the NORCECA Continental Championship under Doug Beal

In 2008, they won the 18-Open National Championship.

In 2009, they were the National Silver Medalist in the 16-Open Division.

In 2006, Neil was awarded the U.S. Olympic committee Developmental Coach of the Year for Volleyball
