= The South (song) =

2013 single by the Cadillac Three

Single by the Cadillac Three featuring Dierks Bentley, Florida Georgia Line and Mike Eli

from the album Bury Me in My Boots
- Released: December 3, 2013
- Genre: Country; Southern rock
- Length: 4:36
- Label: Big Machine
- Songwriter: Jaren Johnston
- Producers: Dann Huff; Justin Niebank

The Cadillac Three singles chronology
"The South" (2013)	"Party Like You" (2014)

Dierks Bentley singles chronology
"I Hold On" (2013)	"The South" (2013)	"Drunk on a Plane" (2014)

Florida Georgia Line singles chronology
"Stay" (2013)	"The South" (2013)	"This Is How We Roll" (2014)

Music video
- "The South" on YouTube

"The South" is a song recorded by American country music band the Cadillac Three. It is their debut release for Big Machine Records. The song features guest vocals from Dierks Bentley, Florida Georgia Line, and Eli Young Band lead singer Mike Eli.

== History ==
Lead singer Jaren Johnston, who wrote the song, told Billboard: "I wanted something for our live set that mirrored 'Kashmir' by Led Zeppelin – maybe a southern version of that. I got into writing it, and started with the lyrics, I remembered the first time I heard 'Sweet Home Alabama,' and I was just mesmerized with it. I thought 'We need something like that.'" The song features guest vocals from Dierks Bentley, Florida Georgia Line, and Eli Young Band lead singer Mike Eli.

== Critical reception ==
The song has received positive critical reception. Markos Papadatos of Digital Journal reviewed the song favorably, praising Johnston's lead vocals and the Southern rock influences. Billy Dukes of Taste of Country also described the song's Southern rock sound favorably. He also said that the song "has depth" and that "Johnston's voice is suited for grungy honky-tonks". Giving it 3.5 out of 5 stars, Matt Bjorke of Roughstock wrote that " there’s some nice lyrical choices…and an overall understanding of what can make an artist unique".

== Music video ==
Shane Drake directed the song's music video.

== Chart performance ==
The song has sold 165,000 copies in the U.S. as of May 2014.

Chart (2013–2014)	Peak position
US Country Airplay (Billboard)	33
US Hot Country Songs (Billboard)	32

== Certifications ==
Region	Certification	Certified units/sales
United States (RIAA)	Gold	500,000^{‡}
^{‡} Sales+streaming figures based on certification alone.
