= Leas Cliff Hall =

Entertainment venue in Folkestone

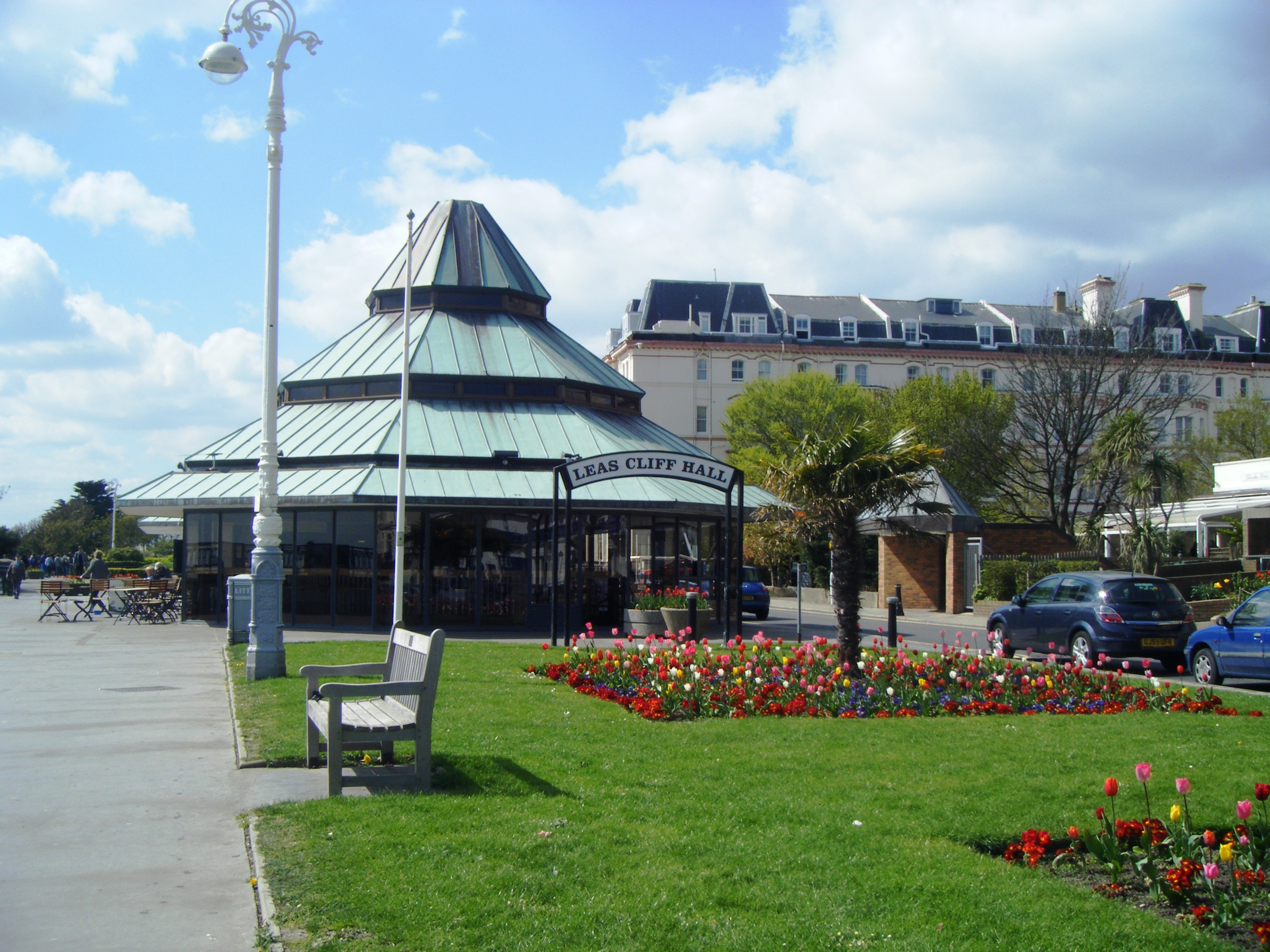
- Interactive map of Leas Cliff Hall
- Address: The Leas; Folkestone, Kent; England
- Coordinates: 51.0758°N 1.17357°E
- Owner: Ambassador Theatre Group (in partnership with Folkestone and Hythe District Council)
- Capacity: Seated 900 / Standing 1,500
- Type: Live Entertainment

Construction
- Opened: 13 July 1927

Website
- http://www.leascliffhall.org.uk

Leas Cliff Hall is an entertainment and function venue situated in Folkestone, on the Kent coast of England. The Grand Hall seats 900 and it has a standing capacity of 1500. It currently presents a varied programme of touring shows including concerts, comedy, ballet and wrestling.

== History ==
The Leas Shelter was constructed in 1894 which was the predecessor of the Leas Cliff Hall. The Shelter had a concert room for entertainment and seated 200, plus an orchestra.

In 1924 it was decided that a larger and more majestic hall was required and only 28 months later the building was finished, it became a tribute to Mr J S Dahl, the Norwegian architect. It was opened on 13 July 1927 by Prince Henry, Duke of Gloucester. The opening concert was performed by the Folkestone Municipal Orchestra where 1,000 people attended.

It was closed for modernisation and refurbishment on 16 September 1980 and re-opened on 6 May 1981 which is the venue seen today.

In the late 1990s Folkestone and Hythe Council invited Apollo Leisure to manage the hall, followed by Clear Channel Entertainment in 2001. In 2005 Clear Channel Entertainment's theatre division became Live Nation. Since November 2009 the venue has been operated by Ambassador Theatre Group and is owned and supported by Folkestone and Hythe District Council.

== Performances ==
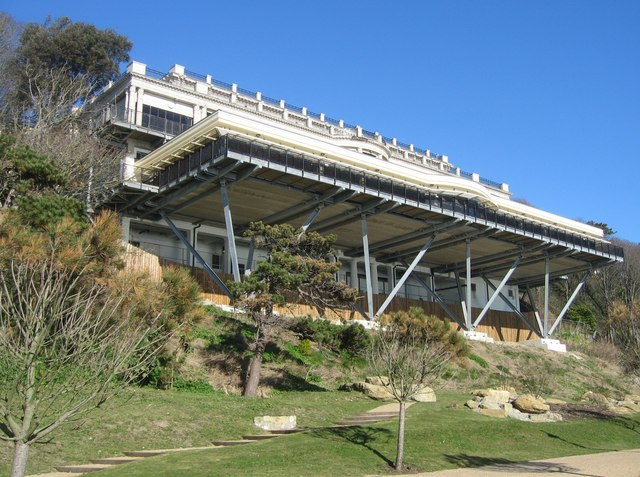
View of the hall from the bottom of the cliff

The stage is flat, 48 feet wide and up to 27 feet deep. The hall can accommodate around 1,000 people seated or 1,500 standing.

Over the years the hall has played host to some of the most famous music acts around such as The Rolling Stones, T Rex, Thin Lizzy, Judas Priest, Paul Weller, Ozzy Osbourne, Status Quo, Motörhead, Kings of Leon, Stereophonics, Queens of the Stone Age, Kaiser Chiefs Frank Turner and Morrissey.

The hall has also seen many comedians over the years, including Victoria Wood, Ken Dodd, Norman Wisdom, Lenny Henry, Brian Conley, Ross Noble, Frankie Boyle and Russell Howard.

The Hall has also hosted many classical concerts, including five by the tenor Richard Tauber, in 1937, 1939, 1940, 1946 and 1947.

== Current activity ==
The venue also houses the Channel Suite, Café, the Coasters bar and the Foyer bar.
