= Accidentally on Purpose (The Shires album) =

Studio album by The Shires
- Released: 20 April 2018
- Recorded: 2017
- Genre: Country pop
- Length: 41:19
- Label: Decca
- Producer: Lindsay Rimes

The Shires chronology
My Universe (2016)	Accidentally on Purpose (2018)

Singles from Accidentally on Purpose
- 1. "Guilty" Released: 9 March 2018; 2. "Echo" Released: 9 June 2018; 3. "Echo" Released: 13 July 2018

Accidentally on Purpose is the third studio album by British country music duo The Shires. It was released on 20 April 2018 by Decca Records. The album was recorded in Nashville, Tennessee and produced by Lindsay Rimes.

== Background ==
In an official statement through Universal Music, Earle and Rhodes stated about the album: "Accidentally on Purpose is full of personal songs that really sums up the whirlwind journey we've been on together. From the first day we met, we’ve been crazy dreamers with big plans, who really believed that Country could break into the UK mainstream. For all those dreams, we never imagined it would all happen so quickly and we're so proud and excited to be releasing our third album."

== Track listing ==
No.	Title	Writer(s)	Length
1.	"The Hard Way"	Ben Earle; Holly Partridge; Jimmy Hogarth	3:50
2.	"Echo"	Earle; Jimmy Robbins; Jeff Cohen	2:52
3.	"Guilty"	Earle; Crissie Rhodes; Lindsay Rimes; Jason Nix	3:11
4.	"Sleepwalk"	Earle; Rhodes; Pete Hammerton; Robin Howe (aka Howl Robin Howl)	3:47
5.	"Accidentally on Purpose"	Earle; Rhodes; Robbins	3:24
6.	"Stay the Night"	Ed Sheeran; John Newman; James Newman; John McDaid	4:07
7.	"Ahead of the Storm"	Earle; Rhodes; Rimes; Matthew Rogers	3:23
8.	"Speechless"	Earle; Lizzy McAvoy	3:36
9.	"River of Love"	Earle; Cohen; Liz Rose	3:03
10.	"Strangers"	Earle; Rhodes; Christopher DeStefano; Emily Weisband	3:29
11.	"World Without You"	Earle; Rhodes; Phil Barton	3:18
12.	"Loving You Too Long"	Earle; Cohen; Forest Whitehead	3:19
Total length:			41:19

== Charts ==
Chart (2018)	Peak position
Scottish Albums (OCC)	2
UK Albums (OCC)	3
UK Country Albums (OCC)	1
