= Brave (The Shires album) =

Studio album by The Shires
- Released: 2 March 2015
- Genre: Country
- Label: Decca

The Shires chronology
Brave (2015)	My Universe (2016)

Brave is the debut studio album by British country music duo The Shires, released in 2015. The album peaked at number ten on the UK Albums Chart, making the Shires the first ever homegrown British country act to have a top ten album in the United Kingdom.

== Track listing ==
No.	Title	Writer(s)	Length
1.	"Tonight"	Ben Earle, Jack McManus, Chris Young	3:44
2.	"Nashville Grey Skies"	Earle	3:44
3.	"Brave"	Earle, Elske DeWall	3:34
4.	"Friday Night"	Earle, Tobias Lundgren, Tim Larsson, Johan Fransson	3:08
5.	"I Just Wanna Love You"	Earle	3:53
6.	"All Over Again"	Earle, Chrissie Rhodes	3:17
7.	"Jekyll and Hyde"	Earle, Rhodes	3:09
8.	"State Lines"	Earle, Lundgren, Larsson, Fransson	3:52
9.	"Black and White"	Earle, Twinnie-Lee Moore	3:41
10.	"Made in England"	Earle, Rhodes, Dan McDougall	3:08
11.	"How Many Love Songs"	Earle	2:27

Deluxe Edition
No.	Title	Writer(s)	Length
12.	"Only Midnight"	Earle, O'Brien	3:50
13.	"Islands in the Stream" (Kenny Rogers and Dolly Parton cover)	Barry Gibb, Robin Gibb, Maurice Gibb	3:25
14.	"Drink You Away"	Earle, Rhodes, Kelly Archer	2:44
15.	"Young Hearts Run Free" (Candi Staton cover)	Dave Crawford	3:28

== Personnel ==
Credits adapted from the liner notes of the deluxe edition of Brave.

The Shires

- Ben Earle – lead vocals, backing vocals, acoustic guitar, bass guitar, piano, mandolin, pedal steel
- Chrissie Rhodes – lead vocals, background vocals

Additional personnel

- Dan McDougall - drums, bass guitar
- Johan Fransson - background vocals
- Oliver Harrop - background vocals
- Mark Hill - bass guitar
- Jonty Howard - background vocals, percussion
- Pat O'Brien - acoustic guitar
- Troy Lancaster - electric guitar
- Tobias Lundgren - background vocals
- Steve Morton - background vocals
- Joe Murphy - percussion
- Mike Payne - electric guitar
- Ben Poole - electric guitar
- Brian Pruitt - drums, percussion
- Davide Rossi - strings

== Charts and certifications ==
=== Weekly charts ===
Chart (2015)	Peak position
New Zealand Albums (RMNZ)	36
Scottish Albums (OCC)	8
UK Albums (OCC)	10
UK Country Albums (OCC)	1

=== Year-end charts ===
Chart (2015)	Position
UK Albums (OCC)	53

=== Certifications ===
Region	Certification	Certified units/sales
United Kingdom (BPI)	Gold	158,636
