= My Universe (album) =

Studio album by the Shires
- Released: 30 September 2016
- Genre: Country pop
- Label: Decca
- Producer: Tim Larsson; Tobias Lundgren; Dan McDougall

The Shires chronology
Brave (2015)	My Universe (2016)	Accidentally on Purpose (2018)

Singles from My Universe
- 1. "Beats to Your Rhythm" Released: 29 July 2016; 2. "My Universe" Released: 16 September 2016

My Universe is the second studio album by British country music duo the Shires, released on 30 September 2016 through Decca Records. The album entered the UK Albums Chart at number three, with sales of 14,913 units which made it the fastest-selling UK country album of all time. The album was recorded in Nashville.

My Universe was accompanied by a tour of the same name.

== Track listing ==
All tracks produced by Tim Larsson and Tobias Lundgren. Additional production on "Beats to Your Rhythm" by Dan McDougall.

No.	Title	Writer(s)	Length
1.	"My Universe"	Ben Earle; Martin Brammer
2.	"Beats to Your Rhythm"	Earle; Dan McDougall
3.	"Not Even Drunk Right Now"	Earle; McDougall; Nina Nesbitt
4.	"Naked"	Earle; Steve Robson; Nesbitt
5.	"Drive"	Earle; Crissie Rhodes; Kip Moore; Manny Medina
6.	"Daddy's Little Girl"	Rhodes; Jeff Cohen; Victoria Banks; Livy Jeanne Richardson
7.	"Everything You Never Gave"	Earle
8.	"Save Me"	Earle; Rhodes; Brian White
9.	"Common Language"	Earle; Jonny Lattimer
10.	"A Thousand Hallelujahs"	Earle; Cohen
11.	"Other People's Things"	Earle; Nesbitt
12.	"Desperate"	Earle; Jack McManus; Young Chris

== Charts and certifications ==
=== Charts ===
Chart (2016–17)	Peak position
Australian Albums (ARIA)	63
Scottish Albums (OCC)	2
UK Albums (OCC)	3
UK Country Albums (OCC)	1

=== Certifications ===
Region	Certification	Certified units/sales
United Kingdom (BPI)	Gold	132,858
