= The Shires (duo) =

British country music duo

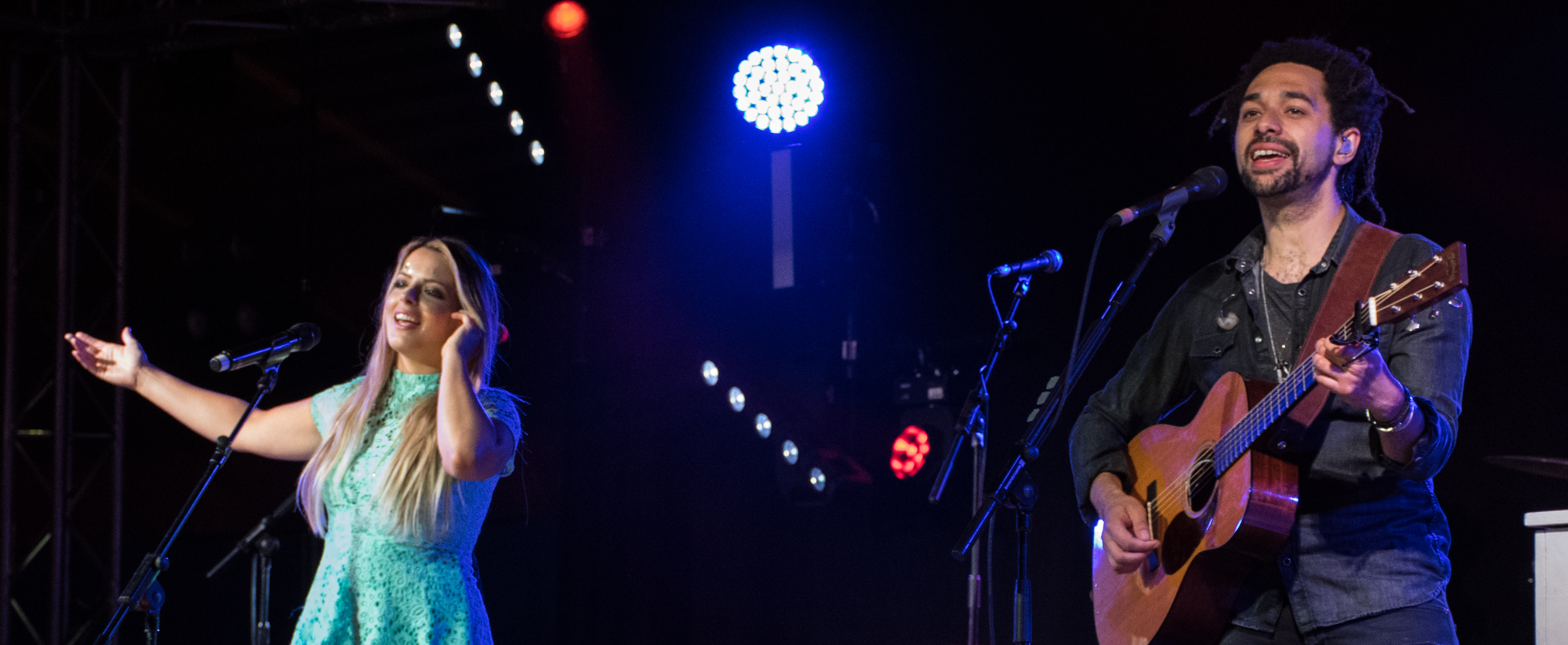
- Performing at Towersey Festival, 2018

Background information
- Origin: Hertfordshire and Bedfordshire, England
- Genres: Country, country pop
- Years active: 2013–2026
- Labels: Decca, Universal Music Group Nashville, Dot, BMG Rights Management
- Members: Ben Earle; Crissie Rhodes
- Website: www.theshiresmusic.com

The Shires are a British country music duo composed of singer-songwriters Ben Earle and Crissie Rhodes. Earle sings harmony vocals, plays piano and guitar, and Rhodes is lead singer. The duo formed in 2013 and released their debut album Brave in 2015, becoming the first British country act to chart in the Top 10 of the UK Albums Chart. The group's second album, My Universe, became the fastest-selling British country album in history when it was released in October 2016.

They hail from the neighbouring counties of Hertfordshire and Bedfordshire in England. "Shire" is the original term for what is usually known as a county in the United Kingdom. The duo took the band name to maintain a British identity and take a small part of Britain to the United States. After playing hardly half a dozen shows together, The Shires caught the attention of Decca Records, who signed them in the United Kingdom, and they secured a contract with American record label Universal Music Group Nashville, thus becoming the first English country act to be signed to a major Nashville label. They were also the first British country act to have a top ten album and the first to receive an award from the American Country Music Association.

Earle and Rhodes were awarded Honorary Doctorates of the Arts by the University of Bedfordshire for their services and contributions to music on 25 July 2019.

== Career ==
=== 2012–2013: Early beginnings ===
Crissie Rhodes performed at weddings, pubs and clubs performing songs by Dolly Parton amongst others. After joining The X Factor in 2013, she was tipped as a winner but failed to qualify out of the early rounds. Her country music influences include Alison Krauss, Martina McBride and Faith Hill. Ben Earle was previously a solo artist and had supported KT Tunstall on tour. Also a failed The X Factor contestant, and a struggling songwriter who had been writing for 10 years, he had tried to get cuts for other artists. He discovered country music in 2012 via Lady Antebellum, the American Grammy Award-winning group. He cites the Kacey Musgraves album Same Trailer Different Park as a major career inspiration. Earle and Rhodes met after Earle, with an aim to become part of a duo, posted a "There must be a country singer somewhere" message on the social media website Facebook, seeking a partner, to which Rhodes responded.

As part of BBC Radio 2's coverage of a festival, the Shires were included as a segment in a documentary titled Nashville UK, which assessed country music's standing in the UK and, as one of its promising artists, their determination to export their British country roots to their American counterparts. The Shires have composed songs with hit Nashville songwriter Steve Mcewan (Keith Urban, Tim McGraw, Carrie Underwood) and Play Productions an accomplished Swedish writing and production company, who comprise Tim Larsson, Johan Fransson and Tobias Lundgren, who have worked with Rascal Flatts and Celine Dion.

=== 2014–2015: Brave ===
They were invited to the C2C: Country to Country 2014 Festival and performed at The Town Square Pop Stage on 16 March 2014 outside the London O2 arena. Their first single "Nashville Grey Skies" was released on 4 April 2014 and received its first airplay on the Bob Harris BBC Radio 2 Country show on 3 April 2014. It was added to the BBC Radio 2 "B" Playlist for the week commencing 3 May 2014 and climbed to the "A" playlist the following week. The song was written by Earle before visiting Music City, which is a song about hope with a pipe dream of building, and the UK having, a country music capital of its very own. It takes the musicality influences from America whilst maintaining a Britishness with the song writing. It contains facetious lines such as "Well they say it's way too cold for cut-off jeans and they won't be drinking moonshine but G & T's" and "We can build our own Nashville under these grey skies".

On 21 April 2014 they travelled to Sweden and then headed to Nashville to begin preparations and record their debut album. The duo toured the UK with Ward Thomas and Little Big Town, prior to their own headlining tour in 2015. In March 2015 the duo returned to play C2C and also released their debut studio album Brave on 2 March 2015. The album peaked at number 10 on the UK Albums Chart, making The Shires the first British country act to have an album in the top 10. In March 2016, as the most successful country music act the UK has ever had, they were invited to C2C as "ambassadors", introducing the acts on the pop-up stages throughout the weekend in London, playing their own sets and appearing in the arena to introduce acts performing on the Yamaha Music Stage. The Shires opened for The Corrs on their comeback tour in 2016 including shows at Birmingham's Genting Arena, Cardiff's Motorpoint Arena, Liverpool's Echo Arena, The O2 Arena London, Manchester Arena, Glasgow's SSE Hydro, Dublin's 3Arena and the SSE Arena Belfast between 19 and 29 January.

=== 2016–2017: My Universe ===
In July 2016, The Shires announced their second studio album My Universe would be released on 30 September 2016. They released "Beats to Your Rhythm" on 29 July as the first single from the album. The second single from the album was "My Universe" and was released on 16 September 2016; it charted at 89 in Scotland. Online music news site, Get to the Front, reviewed the album and stated that "musically, lyrically and vocally there is little else you could ask for in a country album." My Universe debuted at number 3 on the UK Albums Chart and became the fastest selling British country album of all time.

In October 2016, The Shires secured a recording contract with American label Big Machine Label Group and its imprint Dot Records. The Shires said : "We are absolutely thrilled to sign with Dot Records in the US. The UK is our home and we are proud of our success so far, thanks to Decca Records, but it's always been a massive goal for us to build our presence and make a name for ourselves in the USA."

In 2017 their new single "Daddy's Little Girl" was released, joining BBC Radio 2's playlist. It is about Rhodes's late father; the video features footage of her and her dad. On 9 March 2017, The Shires were presented with their first CMA Award by Kristian Bush during the songwriters event at the C2C: Country to Country festival.

=== 2018–2020: Accidentally on Purpose ===
On 26 January 2018, The Shires announced their third studio album Accidentally on Purpose would be released on 20 April 2018 alongside a UK tour. On 8 March 2018, the first single from the album "Guilty" premiered on BBC Radio 2 before being released that day.

The second single "Accidentally on Purpose" was released on 9 June 2018.

The third single "Echo" was released on 13 July 2018.

In 2019, Earle and Rhodes were awarded Honorary Doctorates of the Arts by the University of Bedfordshire for their services to the Arts.

In March 2020, The Shires were announced to be playing the main stage at the C2C: Country to Country festival, replacing Old Dominion who withdrew due to concerns over the COVID-19 pandemic, making The Shires the first British country act to perform a set on the main stage.

March 2020 saw the release of a compilation album called Greatest Hits, which saw the end of their record deal with Decca. The album featured highlights from all three studio albums to that point, as well as many of the band's singles. However, chart wise it failed to equal the success of their other albums only reaching number 52.

The duo also released in March 2020 a new album for their new label BMG entitled Good Years. A single "This Independence Day" was included. This album also saw the group return to the top five of both the Country and National charts which they had also achieved with their previous two studio albums.

=== 2021–present: 10 Year Plan and Bonfire ===
In January 2022, The Shires announced their lead single from their upcoming fifth album, 10 Year Plan would be titled "I See Stars". The band appeared on the BBC Radio 2 breakfast show with Zoe Ball for the single's debut on 26 January, and followed it with the release date for their new album on 11 March 2022. "I See Stars" was BBC Radio 2's record of the week in February 2022.

Following the release of 10 Year Plan, the duo took time off from recording while Rhodes and Earle started families, though they continued to tour. On 13 March 2026, they announced their first new album in four years, Bonfire, which is set for release on 3 July. It was accompanied by the release of lead single "Getaway Car".

== Discography ==
=== Studio albums ===
Title	Details	Peak chart positions					Certifications
Title	Details	UK	UK Country	AUS	NZ	SCO	Certifications
Brave	Released: 2 March 2015; Label: Decca; Formats: CD, digital download	10	1	—	36	8	BPI: Gold
My Universe	Released: 30 September 2016; Label: Decca; Formats: CD, LP, digital download	3	1	63	—	2	BPI: Gold
Accidentally on Purpose	Released: 20 April 2018; Label: Decca; Formats: CD, digital download	3	1	—	—	2	BPI: Silver
Good Years	Released: 13 March 2020; Label: BMG; Formats: CD, LP, digital download	3	1	—	—	2	
10 Year Plan	Released: 11 March 2022; Label: BMG; Formats: CD, LP, digital download	5	1	—	—	6	
Bonfire	Released: 3 July 2026; Label: Blue Highway; Formats: CD, LP, digital download	28	1	—	—	6	

=== Compilation albums ===
Title	Details	Peak chart positions	
Title	Details	UK	SCO
Greatest Hits	Released: 6 March 2020; Label: Decca; Formats: CD, Digital download	52	9

=== Extended plays ===
Title	Details
The Green Note EP	Released: 4 November 2014; Label: Decca; Formats: CD, digital download

=== Singles ===
Year	Title	SCO	Album
2014	"Nashville Grey Skies"	—	Brave
2014	"Tonight"	—	Brave
2015	"Friday Night"	—	Brave
2015	"State Lines"	—	Brave
2015	"All Over Again"	79	Brave
2015	"I Just Wanna Love You"	—	Brave
2016	"Beats to Your Rhythm"	—	My Universe
2016	"My Universe"	89	My Universe
2017	"Daddy's Little Girl"	—	My Universe
2018	"Guilty"	77	Accidentally on Purpose
2018	"Accidentally on Purpose"	—	Accidentally on Purpose
2018	"Echo"	—	Accidentally on Purpose
2020	"Independence Day"	85	Good Years
2022	"I See Stars"	—	10 Year Plan
2023	"Love Like That" (with The Wolfe Brothers)	—	Livin' the Dream
2026	"Getaway Car"	—	Bonfire

=== Music videos ===
Year	Video	Director
2017	"Daddy's Little Girl"	Shaun Silva

== Tours ==
Headline Tour

- UK Tour 2015 (2015)
- My Universe Tour (2016/17)
- Accidentally on Purpose Tour (2018)

Supporting

- Pain Killer Tour (Little Big Town) (UK) (2015)
- White Light Tour (The Corrs) (UK and Ireland) (2016)
- Alone in the Universe tour (Electric Light Orchestra) (UK: Wembley Stadium and KCOM Stadium only) (2017)
- Now Tour (Shania Twain) (UK and Ireland) (2018)
- Cry Pretty Tour 360 (Carrie Underwood) (UK) (2019)
- The Tipping Point World Tour (Tears For Fears) (2022)
- Surrounded by Time Tour (Tom Jones) (2022)

== Live radio appearances ==
The Shires made their national radio debut on 1 May 2014 with a recorded live session with Bob Harris OBE on BBC Radio 2. They performed two songs; "Brave" and "Only Midnight".

Ben Earle presents a show on the country music radio station Absolute Radio Country every Sunday from 9 am to 12 pm.
