= Jack & Jack discography =

The discography of Jack & Jack consists of two EPs, twenty-four singles as a lead artist, ten singles as a featured artist and three promotional singles.

Their debut EP titled Calibraska, was released on July 24, 2015, independently. It peaked on the Billboard 200 at 12th. Their second EP, Gone, failed to repeat similar success as it didn't appear on any charts. It was released via Island Records. As a lead artist, Jack & Jack has had six singles to appear on a US chart, all of which were on Hot R&B/Hip-Hop Songs. "Wild Life" is their only song to appear on the Hot 100, it placed at 87th.

Their collaboration with Jonas Blue, a single titled "Rise" which was included in Blue's debut studio album Blue, had placed in the UK at 3rd and was certified double platinum by ARIA, platinum by the RMNZ, peaked in the Mainstream top 40 in the U.S. and was certified Gold by the RIAA. Jack & Jack released their debut studio album, A Good Friend Is Nice, on January 11, 2019, via Island Records and Universal Music.

In 2022, Jack & Jack reunited with two new singles "Runaway" and "Right Here With You".

== Studio albums ==
Title	Details
A Good Friend Is Nice	Released: January 25, 2019; Format: LP, CD, digital download; Label: Island

== Extended plays ==
Title	Details	Peak chart positions			
Title	Details	US	CAN	FRA	SWI
Calibraska	Released: July 24, 2015; Format: CD, digital download; Label: Independent	12	14	166	—
Gone	Released: May 26, 2017; Format: Digital download; Label: Island	—	—	—	84
"—" denotes a recording that did not chart or was not released in that territory.

== Singles ==
=== As lead artist ===
Title	Year	Peak chart positions				Certifications	Album
Title	Year	US	US Pop	US R&B	US Rap	Certifications	Album
"Distance"	2014	—	—	—	—		Non-album singles
"Flights"	2014	—	—	—	—		Non-album singles
"Paradise (Never Change)"	2014	—	—	—	—		Non-album singles
"Doing It Right"	2014	— (Note: "Doing It Right" did not enter the Billboard Hot 100, but peaked at number 22 on the Bubbling Under Hot 100 chart.)	—	41	—		Non-album singles
"Wild Life"	2014	87	—	25	16		Non-album singles
"Cold Hearted"	2014	—	—	48	—		Non-album singles
"Tides"	2014	—	—	46	—		Non-album singles
"Groove"	2014	—	—	—	—		Non-album singles
"Right Where You Are"	2014	—	—	50	—		Non-album singles
"Like That" (featuring Skate)	2014	— (Note: "Like That" did not enter the Billboard Hot 100, but peaked at number 10 on the Bubbling Under Hot 100 chart.)	—	36	25	RIAA: Gold	Non-album singles
"Cheat Codes" (featuring Emblem3)	2014	—	—	—	—		Non-album singles
"All Weekend Long"	2016	—	—	—	—		Non-album singles
"Beg"	2017	—	29	—	—		Non-album singles
"I Don't Know"	2018	—	—	—	—		Non-album singles
"Closure"	2018	—	—	—	—		Non-album singles
"Stay with Me"	2018	—	—	—	—		Non-album singles
"No One Compares to You"	2018	—	—	—	—	RIAA: Gold; RMNZ: Gold	A Good Friend Is Nice
"Tension"	2019	—	—	—	—		A Good Friend Is Nice
"Runaway"	2022	—	—	—	—		Non-album singles
"Right Here with You"	2022	—	—	—	—		Non-album singles
"Stuttering"	2023	—	—	—	—		Non-album singles
"Our Song"	2025	—	—	—	—		
"—" denotes a recording that did not chart or was not released in that territory.

=== As featured artist ===
Title	Year	Peak chart positions										Certifications	Album
Title	Year	US Bub.	AUS	AUT	DEN	GER	NL	NOR	NZ	SWE	UK	Certifications	Album
"Bucket List" (Wesley Stromberg featuring Jack & Jack)	2015	—	—	—	—	—	—	—	—	—	—		Non-album singles
"Party of the Year" (DJ Rupp featuring Jack & Jack)	2015	—	—	—	—	—	—	—	—	—	—		Non-album singles
"Firecracker" (Dyllan Murray featuring Tyga and Jack & Jack)	2015	—	—	—	—	—	—	—	—	—	—		Dyllan Murray EP
"Roll 'Em Up" (Alli Simpson featuring Jack & Jack)	2015	—	—	—	—	—	—	—	—	—	—		Non-album singles
"All for Love" (Madison Beer featuring Jack & Jack)	2015	—	—	—	—	—	—	—	—	—	—		Non-album singles
"808" (Kalin and Myles featuring Jack & Jack)	2015	—	—	—	—	—	—	—	—	—	—		Kalin and Myles
"I'm in Love" (Skate featuring Jack & Jack)	2016	—	—	—	—	—	—	—	—	—	—		Non-album single
"Throw Signs" (Sammy Wilk featuring Jack & Jack)	2016	—	—	—	—	—	—	—	—	—	—		Ready for War
"Uber Confessions" (DJ Rupp featuring Jack & Jack)	2016	—	—	—	—	—	—	—	—	—	—		Non-album single
"Empire" (Sweet California featuring Jack & Jack)	2016	—	—	—	—	—	—	—	—	—	—		3
"Rise" (Jonas Blue featuring Jack & Jack)	2018	9	7	2	20	8	9	10	13	14	3	RIAA: Gold; ARIA: 6× Platinum; BPI: 2× Platinum; BVMI: Platinum; GLF: 2× Platinum; IFPI DEN: Platinum; NVPI: Platinum; RMNZ: 3× Platinum	Blue & A Good Friend is Nice
"—" denotes a recording that did not chart or was not released in that territory.

== Promotional singles ==
Title	Year	Album
"Indoor Recess"	2013	Non-album singles
"I'm In"	2014	Non-album singles
"Do Better"	2016	Non-album singles

== Music videos ==
Title	Year	Director
As lead artist
"Do It Right"	2014	Dylan Adams
"Tides"	2014	Andre LaDon
"Wild Life"	2014	Niklaus Lange
"Like That" (featuring Skate)	2015	Andre LaDon
"Groove"	2015	Andre LaDon
"California"	2015	Raúl Fernández
"How We Livin"	2016	Andre LaDon
As featured artist
"Roll 'Em Up" (Alli Simpson featuring Jack & Jack)	2015	The Young Astronauts
"Firecracker" (Dyllan Murray featuring Tyga and Jack & Jack)	2015	Brecht Vanthof
"All for Love" (Madison Beer featuring Jack & Jack)	2015	Hans Emanuel
"Rise" (Jonas Blue featuring Jack & Jack)	2018	Sashinski
