= Morgan Taylor Reid =

American musician and singer-songwriter

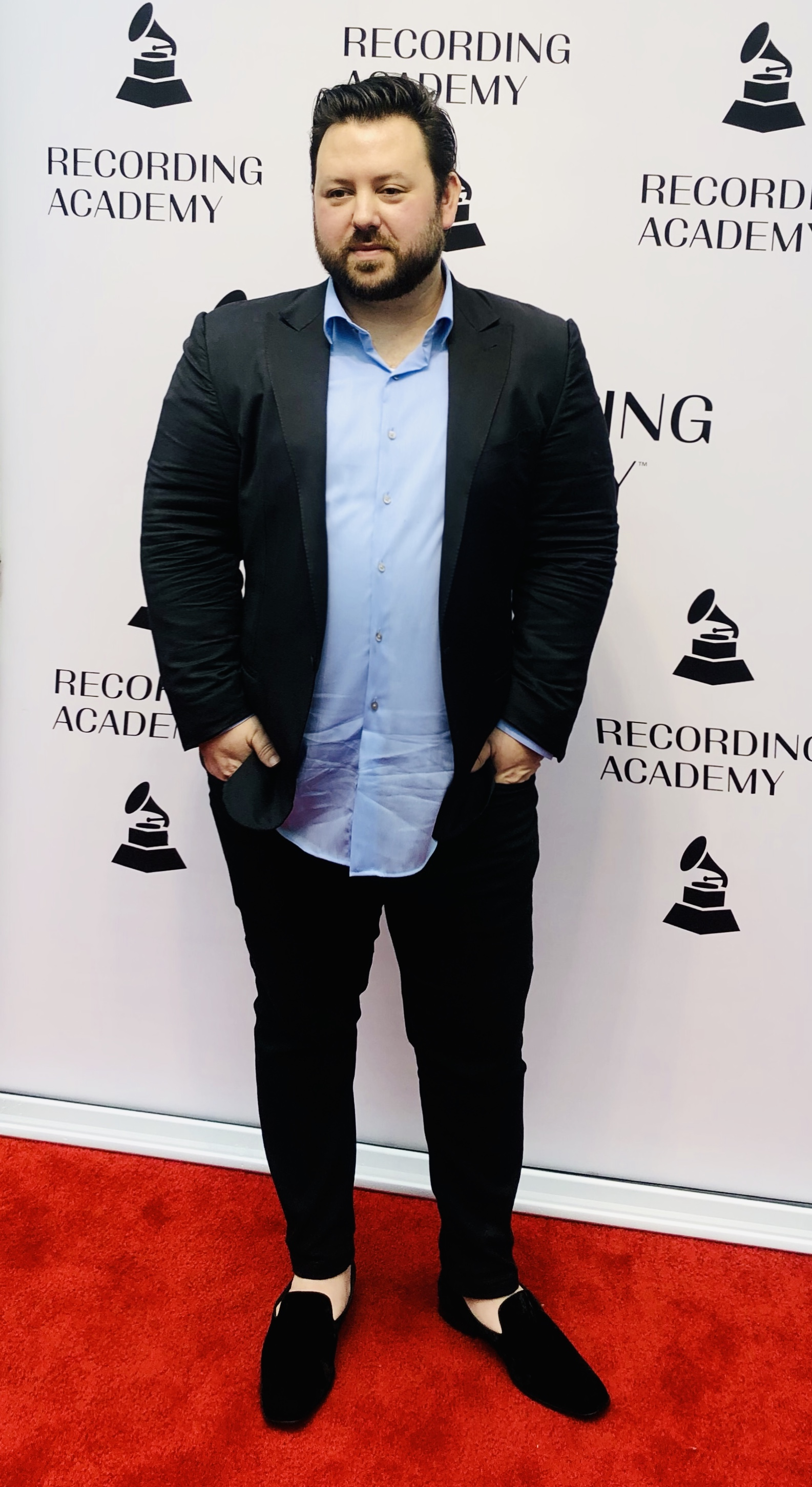
- Reid at the Grammy Nominee Brunch 2019

Background information
- Born: Morgan Taylor Reid; Santa Rosa, California
- Genres: Pop; alternative; rock; adult contemporary music; indie rock; indie pop
- Occupations: Singer-songwriter; record producer; musician
- Instruments: Vocals; piano; synthesizer; guitar; bass; mandolin; ukulele; drums; percussion
- Website: Official website

Morgan Taylor Reid is a Grammy Award nominated music producer, singer-songwriter and recording artist based in Los Angeles. As an artist, Reid's music has been licensed for television including his song "Brighter" that was featured in the Season 7 finale of Grey's Anatomy, his song "Simply Human" featured on House (Season 8, Episode 9 FOX) and his song "Where Do I Even Start?" featured in Season 8, Episode 8 of Grey's Anatomy. After being featured on Grey's Anatomy, "Where Do I Even Start?" reached #74 on the Top 100 Alternative Songs on iTunes.

As a songwriter and record producer, Reid has worked with several artists including the Backstreet Boys. Reid wrote and produced five songs on the Backstreet Boys album In A World Like This including their single "Show 'Em (What You're Made Of)". Reid also produced their holiday single "It's Christmas Time Again", which he wrote with Backstreet Boys members Nick Carter and Howie Dorough along with songwriter Mika Guillory.

== Producing career ==
Reid lives and works in Los Angeles. He has written and produced several songs for artists such as Backstreet Boys, Megan Nicole (Bad Boy Records), Plug in Stereo (Atlantic Records), Shane Harper (Deep Well Records (Adam Anders) and several indie artists.

In April 2011, Reid began co-producing with record producer RedOne. They worked on music for the band 7Lions (2101 Records/Universal Music Group). Reid wrote, produced and developed the debut EP Born 2 Run for the band 7Lions. After its release on June 19, 2012, the Born 2 Run album debuted on the Billboard Hot 100 charts at #15 on the Alternative Chart and #33 on the New Artist Chart.

In addition to the Backstreet Boys 2012 Christmas single "It's Christmas Time Again", Reid also wrote and produced five tracks on the Backstreet Boys 2013 album; In a World Like This.

Reid has been working with artist Grace Mitchell since she was 14 years old. On December 17, 2013, the soundtrack to the film The Secret Life of Walter Mitty was released, it featured a cover of Hall & Oates's Maneater performed by Mitchell and produced by Reid. At the age of seventeen, Mitchell released her debut album; Design – EP, on Universal Republic Records.

== Solo artist career ==
Reid's solo album is called Simply Human. It is an acoustic album. The single "Stay Where You Are" was used in a Levi's campaign. The album's songs "Brighter" and "Where Do I Even Start?" were used on Grey's Anatomy. After being featured on Grey's Anatomy, "Where Do I Even Start?" reached #74 on the Top 100 Alternative Songs on iTunes. Reid's song "Simply Human" was featured on the show House in 2012.

On November 21, 2012, Reid released a single, called "Science", which he wrote with CTodd Nielsen and Matt Mugford. The single was released the same day it was featured on Private Practice.

== Discography ==
Year	Label	Artist	Album	Title	Credited As
2026	Nettwerk Music Group	JOSEPH	Closer to Happy	"Blindspot"	Writer
2026	Nettwerk Music Group	JOSEPH	Closer to Happy	"Ready to Let You Down"	Writer
2026	3Keys Records	Samantha Jade	Very That! – Single	"Very That!"	Writer, Producer, Mixer
2025	MCA	Mickey Guyton & Michael Bolton	Feels Like Christmas	"Christmas Isn't Christmas"	Writer, Producer, Mixer
2025	Cheat Codes	Cheat Codes	Future Renaissance	"Go To Hell (feat. CeeLo Green)"	Producer
2025	Capital CMG	Blessing Offor	Real	"Lift Me Up"	Writer, Producer
2025	Capital CMG	Blessing Offor	Real	"Crying Out Loud"	Writer, Producer
2025	TOO Records	The Driver Era, Ross Lynch & Rocky	Obsession	"Don't Walk Away"	Writer, Producer
2025	TOO Records	The Driver Era, Ross Lynch & Rocky	Obsession	"Same Old Story"	Writer, Producer
2025	TOO Records	The Driver Era, Ross Lynch & Rocky	Obsession	"Don’t Take the Night"	Writer, Producer
2025	TOO Records	The Driver Era, Ross Lynch & Rocky	Obsession	"I’d Rather Die"	Writer, Producer
2025	Kartel Music Group	Renata Vaca	Puertas – Single	"Puertas"	Writer, Producer
2024	Capitol CMG	Blessing Offor	Covers	"Godspeed" (Frank Ocean cover)	Producer
2024	Blue Suit	Jesse McCartney	All's Well - EP	"Faux Fur"	Producer
2024	Blue Suit	Jesse McCartney	All's Well - EP	"Silver Spoon"	Producer
2024	Blue Suit	Jesse McCartney	All's Well - EP	"The Well"	Writer, Producer
2024	Capital CMG	Blessing Offor	Autobahn - Single	"Autobahn"	Writer, Vocal-Producer
2024	3Keys Records	Samantha Jade	Love.Sick Volume 2	"Peachy"	Writer, Producer
2024	3Keys Records	Samantha Jade	Love.Sick Volume 2	"Minutes to Midnight"	Writer, Producer
2023	Montaigne Records	Michael Bolton & Mickey Guyton	Christmas Time	"Christmas Isn't Christmas"	Writer, Producer, Mixer
2023	Montaigne Records	Michael Bolton	Spark of Light	"Just the Beginning"	Writer, Producer
2023	Montaigne Records	Michael Bolton	Spark of Light	"Running out of Ways"	Writer, Producer
2023	Capital CMG	Blessing Offor	(Amazon Music Original)	"Godspeed"	Producer
2023	The Driver Era	Ross Lynch & The Driver Era	Rumors - Single	"Rumors"	Writer, Producer
2023	Manic Kat Records	Ryan Cabrera	Prescription of You - Single	"Prescription of You"	Writer, Producer
2023	ASTRID ROELANTS	Ameerah	THE CARNIVAL - Single	"THE CARNIVAL"	Writer, Producer
2023	ASTRID ROELANTS	Ameerah	THE CARNIVAL - Single	"ARMAGEDDON"	Writer, Producer
2022	Megan Nicole Music	Megan Nicole	Christmas Morning - EP	"Christmas Morning"	Writer, Producer, Mixer
2022	Megan Nicole Music	Megan Nicole	Christmas Morning - EP	"Christmas Wrapping"	Producer, Mixer
2022	Megan Nicole Music	Megan Nicole	Christmas Morning - EP	"Jingle Bells"	Producer, Mixer
2022	Megan Nicole Music	Megan Nicole	Christmas Morning - EP	"Last Christmas"	Producer, Mixer
2022	Megan Nicole Music	Megan Nicole	Christmas Morning - EP	"Sleigh Ride"	Producer, Mixer
2022	K-BAHN; BMG	Backstreet Boys	A Very Backstreet Christmas	"It's Christmas Time Again"	Writer, Producer, Mixer
2022	Poorboy Music	Zac Poor	Ghost Boy - Single	"Ghost Boy"	Writer, Producer, Mixer
2021	300 Entertainment	Cheat Codes	Hellraisers, Pt. 1	"Mathematics"	Writer, Producer
2021	300 Entertainment	Cheat Codes	Hellraisers, Pt. 1	"No Chill (feat. Lil XXel)"	Vocal Producer
2021	300 Entertainment	Cheat Codes	Hellraisers, Pt. 1	"Washed Up"	Vocal Producer
2021	Blue Suit	Jesse McCartney	New Stage	"Discovering You"	Producer
2021	Blue Suit	Jesse McCartney	New Stage	"Kiss the World Goodbye"	Writer, Producer
2021	Blue Suit	Jesse McCartney	New Stage	"What If I Missed You"	Writer, Producer
2020	AWAL	COIN	Dreamland	"Never Change"	Writer, Producer
2020	AWAL	DAYVID	Spinning Bottles - Single	"Spinning Bottles"	Writer, Producer
2020	Atlantic Records	Dahl	Can I Kiss You? - Single	"Can I Kiss You?"	Writer, Producer
2020	Pure Noise Records	Meg & Dia	Happysad	"Koala"	Writer, Vocal Producer
2019	Atlantic Records	Alexander Cardinale	Simple Things (feat. Christina Perri) - Single	"Simple Things (feat. Christina Perri)"	Writer, Producer
2019	Island Records	American Authors	Seasons	"I Wanna Go Out"	Writer, Producer
2019	Island Records	Jack & Jack	A Good Friend Is Nice	"Meet U in the Sky"	Writer, Producer
2019	AWAL	DAYVID	VHS (feat. Prophet) - Single	"VHS (feat. Prophet)"	Writer, Producer
2019	AWAL	DAYVID	Dayvid - EP	"Keep It Together"	Writer, Producer
2019	AWAL	DAYVID	Dayvid - EP	"Wasted Luv"	Writer, Producer
2019	AWAL	DAYVID	Dayvid - EP	"Drnk Txts"	Writer, Producer
2019	AWAL	DAYVID	Dayvid - EP	"Got My Sunglasses On"	Writer, Producer
2019	AWAL	DAYVID	Dayvid - EP	"Love Like You"	Writer, Producer
2019	AWAL	DAYVID	Dayvid - EP	"Same Old Feeling"	Writer, Producer
2019	AWAL	DAYVID	Find You This Christmas - Single	"Find You This Christmas"	Writer, Producer
2019	Disruptor Records	Gia Woods	Keep on Coming - Single	"Keep on Coming"	Writer, Producer
2019	TOO Records	The Driver Era	X	"Natural"	Writer, Producer
2018	Lakeshore Records	Bella Thorne	Midnight Sun (Original Motion Picture Soundtrack)	"Burn So Bright"	Producer
2018	Lakeshore Records	Bella Thorne	Midnight Sun (Original Motion Picture Soundtrack)	"Let The Light In"	Producer
2018	Lakeshore Records	Bella Thorne	Midnight Sun (Original Motion Picture Soundtrack)	"Reaching"	Producer
2018	Lakeshore Records	Bella Thorne	Midnight Sun (Original Motion Picture Soundtrack)	"Sweetest Feeling"	Producer
2018	Lakeshore Records	Bella Thorne	Midnight Sun (Original Motion Picture Soundtrack)	"Walk With Me"	Producer
2018	Atlantic Records	Chromeo	Head Over Heals	"Bad Decision"	Writer, Producer
2018	Creative Nation	Steve Moakler	Born Ready	"Slow Down"	Writer
2017	Island Records	American Authors	I Wanna Go Out - Single	"I Wanna Go Out"	Writer, Producer
2017		Cardiknox	Bad Boys - Single	"Bad Boys"	Writer
2017	Slippery Eel	Emii	Read My Mind EP	"Read My Mind"	Writer, Producer
2017	California Country Music	Leah Turner	Leah Turner - EP	"Sleep You Off"	Writer, Producer
2017	Warner Bros. Records	Mikey Mike	Going Charlie - Single	"Going Charlie"	Writer, Producer
2017	Entertainment	Sam Fischer	Getting Older - Single	"Getting Older"	Writer, Producer
2017	Epic Records	Wrabel	We Could Be Beautiful - EP	"Ritual"	Writer, Producer
2016	ATO	Joseph	I'm Alone, No You're Not	"Blood & Tears"	Writer
2016	ATO	Joseph	I'm Alone, No You're Not	"White Flag"	Writer
2016	Warner Bros. Records	Alexander Cardinale	Made for You - Single	"Made for You"	Writer, Producer
2016		Gia	Straight Up - Single	"Straight Up"	Producer
2016	Owsla	Marshmello	Ritual (feat. Wrabel) - Single	"Ritual (feat. Wrabel)"	Writer, Vocal Producer
2016	Parlophone	Matoma & Gia	Heart Won't Forget - Single	"Heart Won't Forget"	Writer, Co-Producer
2016		Megan Nicole	Mascara - Single	"Mascara"	Writer, Producer, Mixer
2016	Virgin	Shane Harper	Like I Did EP	"P.O.W.E.R."	Writer, producer
2016	Virgin	Shane Harper	Like I Did EP	"Satellite"	Writer, Producer
2015	Republic	Grace Mitchell	Raceday – EP	"NoLo"	Writer
2015	Republic	Grace Mitchell	Raceday – EP	"Breaking Hearts"	Writer
2015	DCD2	MAX	Gibberish - Single	"Gibberish (feat. Hoodie Allen)"	Writer
2014	Republic	Grace Mitchell	Design – EP	"Runaway"	Writer, Producer
2014	Republic	Grace Mitchell	Design – EP	"Broken Over You"	Writer, Producer
2014	Republic	Grace Mitchell	Design – EP	"Always & Forever"	Producer
2014	Republic	Grace Mitchell	Design – EP	"Your Design"	Producer
2014		MAX	The Say Max – EP	"Darling"	Writer, Producer
2014	Atlantic Records	Plug in Stereo	A Little Peace – EP	"Don't Say Goodnight"	Writer, Producer
2014	Atlantic Records	Plug in Stereo	A Little Peace – EP	"Everything I Shouldn't Say"	Writer, Producer
2014	Atlantic Records	Plug in Stereo	A Little Peace – EP	"Home Soon"	Writer, Producer
2014	Atlantic Records	Plug in Stereo	A Little Peace – EP	"To Be Wanted (Feat. Megan & Liz)"	Writer, Producer
2014	Atlantic Records	Plug in Stereo	A Little Peace – EP	"Wait For Me"	Writer, Producer
2013	2101 Records	7Lions		"Taking Over – Single"	Writer, Producer
2013	Hopeless Records	Anarbor	Burnout	"18"	Writer
2013	Hopeless Records	Anarbor	Burnout	"What He Don't Know"	Writer
2013	K-BAHN; BMG	Backstreet Boys	In A World Like This	"In Your Arms"	Writer, Producer
2013	K-BAHN; BMG	Backstreet Boys	In A World Like This	"One Phone Call"	Writer, Producer
2013	K-BAHN; BMG	Backstreet Boys	In A World Like This	"Permanent Stain"	Writer, Producer
2013	K-BAHN; BMG	Backstreet Boys	In A World Like This	"Show 'Em (What You're Made Of)"	Writer, Producer
2013	K-BAHN; BMG	Backstreet Boys	In A World Like This	"Soldier"	Writer, Producer
2013	Republic	Grace Mitchell	The Secret Life of Walter Mitty	"Maneater"	Producer, Mixer
2013		Max Schneider		"Nothing Without Love" – Single	Writer, Producer, Mixer
2013		Morgan Taylor Reid	A Minor Heartbeat	"City in Motion"	Writer, Producer, Mixer
2013		Morgan Taylor Reid	A Minor Heartbeat	"Ghost Town"	Writer, Producer, Mixer
2013		Morgan Taylor Reid	A Minor Heartbeat	"Love Lock Maze"	Writer, Producer, Mixer
2013		Morgan Taylor Reid	A Minor Heartbeat	"Say Goodnight"	Writer, Producer, Mixer
2013		Morgan Taylor Reid	A Minor Heartbeat	"Sweeter Sound"	Writer, Producer, Mixer
2013		Morgan Taylor Reid	A Minor Heartbeat	"Take Care, Remember Me"	Writer, Producer, Mixer
2013		Morgan Taylor Reid	A Minor Heartbeat	"The Greener Side"	Writer, Producer, Mixer
2013	Bad Boy Records	Megan Nicole		"Summer Forever" – Single	Writer, Producer, Mixer
2013	Atlantic Records	Plug in Stereo		"To Be Wanted" (feat. Megan & Liz) – Single	Writer, Producer
2013	Inpop Records	Shane Harper		"Hold You Up" – Single	Writer, Producer, Mixer
2012	2101 Records	7Lions	Born 2 Run – EP	"Born 2 Run"	Writer, Producer
2012	2101 Records	7Lions	Born 2 Run – EP	"Emergency"	Writer, Producer
2012	2101 Records	7Lions	Born 2 Run – EP	"One Man Symphony"	Writer, Producer
2012	2101 Records	7Lions	Born 2 Run – EP	"One More Time"	Writer, Producer
2012	2101 Records	7Lions	Born 2 Run – EP	"Taking Over"	Writer, Producer
2012	K-BAHN	Backstreet Boys		"It's Christmas Time Again" – Single	Writer, Producer, Mixer
2012	Atlantic Records	Plug in Stereo	The Patience – EP	"Frozen Heart"	Writer, Producer
2012	Atlantic Records	Plug in Stereo	The Patience – EP	"I Blame You"	Writer, Producer
2012	Atlantic Records	Plug in Stereo	The Patience – EP	"Patience"	Writer, Producer
2012	Atlantic Records	Plug in Stereo	The Patience – EP	"You're on My Mind"	Writer, Producer
2012	2101 Records	Porcelain Black		"Sunday Bloody Sunday" (feat. 7Lions) – Cover	Producer, Mixer
2012		Morgan Taylor Reid		"Science" – Single	Writer, Producer, Mixer
2012	Deep Well Records	Shane Harper	Dancin' in the Rain – EP	"Flat World"	Writer, Producer
2012	Deep Well Records	Shane Harper	Dancin' in the Rain – EP	"Say It Cause I Know It"	Writer, Producer
2012	Deep Well Records	Shane Harper	Dancin' in the Rain – EP	"Your Love" – Cover	Producer
2012	Deep Well Records	Shane Harper	Shane Harper	"I Know What I Know" (feat. Prophet)	Writer, Producer
2012	Deep Well Records	Shane Harper	Shane Harper	"When I Look into Your Eyes"	Writer, Producer
2011		Morgan Taylor Reid	Brighter – EP	"Back in Time"	Writer, Producer, Mixer
2011		Morgan Taylor Reid	Brighter – EP	"Brighter"	Writer, Producer, Mixer
2011		Morgan Taylor Reid	Brighter – EP	"Where Do I Even Start?"	Writer, Producer, Mixer
2010		Morgan Taylor Reid	Simply Human – EP	"Brighter"	Writer, Producer, Mixer
2010		Morgan Taylor Reid	Simply Human – EP	"One"	Writer, Producer, Mixer
2010		Morgan Taylor Reid	Simply Human – EP	"Simply Human"	Writer, Producer, Mixer
2010		Morgan Taylor Reid	Simply Human – EP	"Stay Where You Are"	Writer, Producer, Mixer
2010		Morgan Taylor Reid	Simply Human – EP	"Touch"	Writer, Producer, Mixer
2010		Morgan Taylor Reid	Simply Human – EP	"When Your Heart Is Able"	Writer, Producer, Mixer

== Awards ==
Grammy Awards

Year	Nominee / work	Award	Result
2019	Head Over Heels	Best Engineered Album, Non-Classical	Nominated

Juno Awards

Year	Nominee / work	Award	Result
2019	Head Over Heels	Pop Album of the Year	Nominated
