= Made for You =

"Made for You" may refer to:

- "Made for You" (Alexander Cardinale song), 2016
- "Made for You" (Joakim Lundell song), 2018
- "Made for You" (Jake Owen song), 2019
- "Made for You", a song by Nantucket from Nantucket V
- "Made for You", a song by OneRepublic from their 2009 album Waking Up
