= That's on Me =

That's on Me may refer to:

- "That's on Me" by rapper Yella Beezy, which reached number 56 on the Billboard Hot 100
- "That's on Me", a 2019 song by country singer Jake Owen from his album Greetings from... Jake
