= Grace Mitchell =

American singer and songwriter (born 1997)

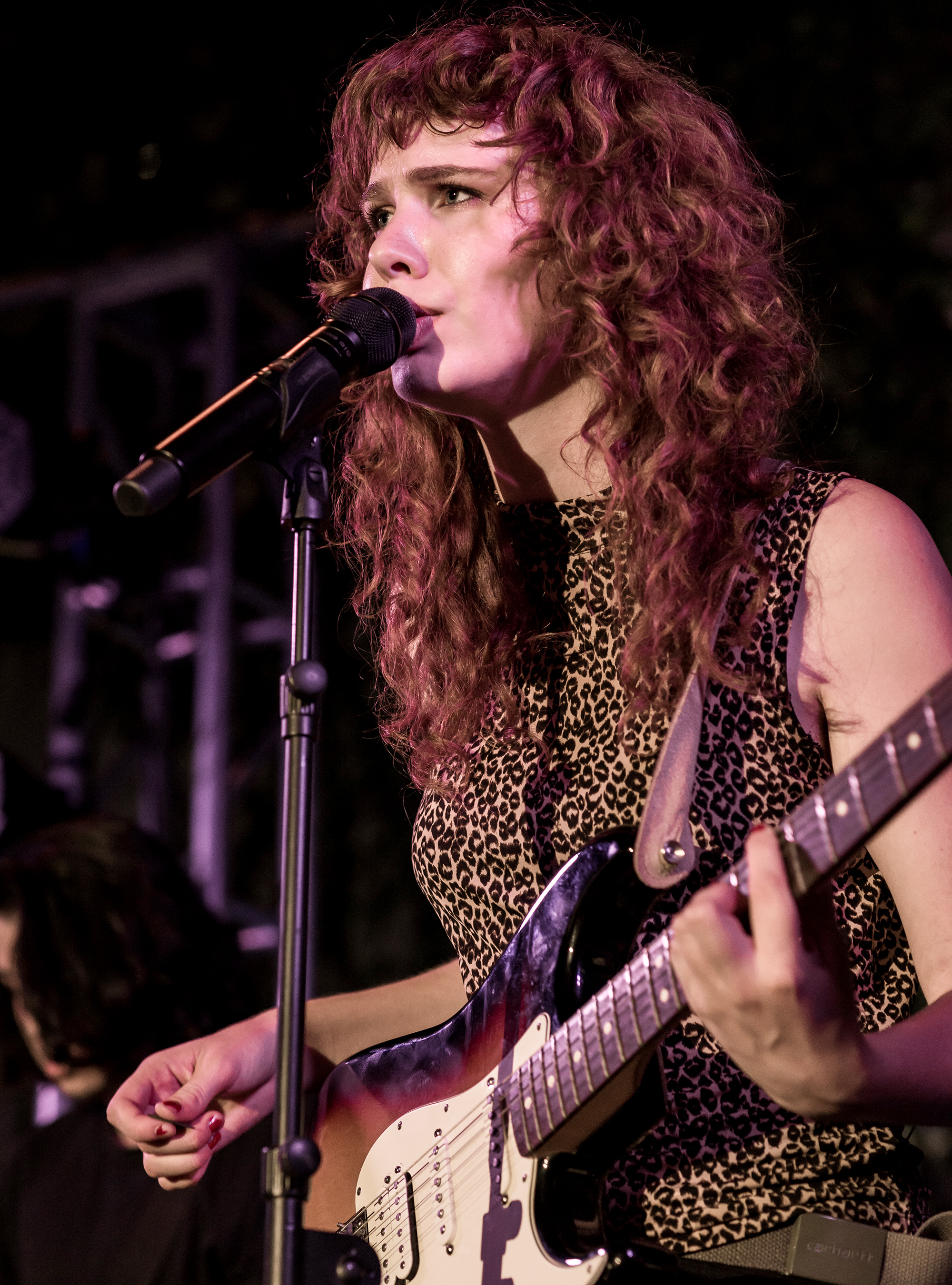

Background information
- Born: August 5, 1997 (age 29); Australia
- Genre: Alternative
- Website: www.gracemitchellmusic.com

Grace Mitchell is an American singer and songwriter. She was born in Australia, moved to the United States at age three and was raised in Cottage Grove and Eugene, Oregon. She has released two EPs, titled Design and Raceday.

She performed the Hall & Oates track "Maneater" for the soundtrack of the film The Secret Life of Walter Mitty.

Grace plays keyboards, drums, and guitars. She signed with Casablanca Records in 2013 and after a year in Portland moved to Los Angeles. Her debut EP Design was released in October 2014 and was produced by Morgan Taylor Reid. Her follow-up EP Raceday, produced by Mark Foster and Rich Costey, was released in November 2015. The song "Jitter", from Raceday, was singled out for "earning an avalanche of internet buzz," with prominent DJ and BBC Radio 1 host Zane Lowe saying it "might be the song of the year so far" while describing Mitchell as "absolutely a new contender in the pop world." In 2017 she released a number of singles, including "Kids (Ain't All Right)", "Bae", "Now", "Cali God", "Come Back for You", "Capital Letters", and in September of that year, "French Becky", co-written by Nate Donmoyer and Kam Mohager, with Cara Salimando and Mitchell. She has continued to release more singles since then.

Mitchell was in the Coachella 2017 line-up.

== Discography ==
=== Extended plays ===
- Design (2014), produced by Morgan Taylor Reid

No.	Title	Artist(s)	Length
1.	"Runaway"	Grace Mitchell	3:16
2.	"Broken Over You"	Grace Mitchell	3:17
3.	"Always & Forever"	Grace Mitchell	3:36
4.	"Your Design"	Grace Mitchell	4:13
Total length:			13:82

- Raceday EP (2015), produced by Mark Foster and Rich Costey

No.	Title	Artist(s)	Length
1.	"Raceday"	Grace Mitchell	3:05
2.	"NoLo"	Grace Mitchell	4:25
3.	"Jitter"	Grace Mitchell	4:07
4.	"Breaking Hearts"	Grace Mitchell	3:27
5.	"Bae (feat. S.Pri Noir)"	Grace Mitchell; S. Pri Noir	3:24

=== Singles ===
- "Jitter" (SNBRN Remix) (2015) – 4:17
- "White Iverson" (2016) – 3:39
- "Kids (Ain't All Right)" (2017) – 2:29
- "NOW" (2017) – 4:27
- "Now - Acoustic)" (2017) – 4:08
- "Cali God" (2017) – 3:16
- "Come Back For You" (2017) – 3:32
- "Capital Letters" (2017) – 3:35
- "French Becky" (2017) – 3:45
- "RIIICH" (2017) – 3:14
- "Mango" (2021) – 3:05
- "Tryst" (2021) – 3:40

=== Other songs ===
- "Maneater" (Hall & Oates) from The Secret Life of Walter Mitty (Music from and Inspired by the Motion Picture) – 3:54
