= Homemade (song) =

Single by Jake Owen

from the album Greetings from... Jake
- Released: June 3, 2019
- Genre: Country
- Length: 3:12
- Label: Big Loud
- Songwriter(s): Bobby Pinson; Drew Parker; Jared Mullins; Ben Goldsmith
- Producer(s): Joey Moi

Jake Owen singles chronology
"Down to the Honkytonk" (2018)	"Homemade" (2019)	"Made for You" (2020)

"Homemade" is a song recorded by American country music singer Jake Owen. It was released in June 2019 as the third single from his sixth studio album, Greetings from... Jake.

== Content ==
Written by Bobby Pinson, Drew Parker, Jared Mullins, Ben Goldsmith, and produced by Joey Moi, "Homemade" is described as a celebration of growing up in small town America.

== Commercial performance ==
"Homemade" topped Billboard's Country Airplay in March 2020. It has sold 32,000 copies in the United States as of March 2020.

== Music video ==
The music video for "Homemade" premiered on September 27, 2019, and tells the love story of Owen's own grandparents. Owen described their relationship as the classic American love story: "When I think about the love that people have had together, and I think about their story, there are plenty of songs that could be written about the love they share together." The video, which was shot in Lynnville, Tennessee and directed by Justin Clough, is set in the 1940s and shows Owen portraying his grandfather's younger self.

== Charts ==
=== Weekly charts ===
Chart (2019–2020)	Peak position
Canada (Canadian Hot 100)	100
Canada Country (Billboard)	1
US Billboard Hot 100	39
US Country Airplay (Billboard)	1
US Hot Country Songs (Billboard)	5

=== Year-end charts ===
Chart (2020)	Position
US Country Airplay (Billboard)	18
US Hot Country Songs (Billboard)	49

== Certifications ==
Region	Certification	Certified units/sales
Canada (Music Canada)	Gold	40,000^{‡}
United States (RIAA)	Platinum	1,000,000^{‡}
^{‡} Sales+streaming figures based on certification alone.
