= A Very Backstreet Christmas =

2022 studio album by Backstreet Boys

Studio album by Backstreet Boys
- Released: October 14, 2022
- Recorded: May 5, 2021 – August 14, 2021
- Genres: Christmas; pop
- Length: 43:37; 49:53 (deluxe edition)
- Labels: K-BAHN; BMG
- Producers: Tommy Brown; Gary Baker; Josh Conerly; Tommy Parker; Morgan Taylor Reid; Travis Sayles; Shintaro Yasuda

Backstreet Boys chronology
DNA (2019)	A Very Backstreet Christmas (2022)

Singles from A Very Backstreet Christmas
- 1. "It's Christmas Time Again" Released: November 6, 2012; 2. "Last Christmas" Released: September 6, 2022; 3. "Christmas in New York" Released: December 6, 2022

A Very Backstreet Christmas is the tenth studio album (ninth in the United States) and the first Christmas album by the Backstreet Boys. Initially slated for release in 2021, it was delayed due to the COVID-19 pandemic and released on October 14, 2022. It entered the Billboard Top Holiday Albums chart at number 1, and debuted at number 17 on the Billboard 200 chart.

A related television special, A Very Backstreet Holiday, was pulled from airing and streaming after sexual assault allegations against Nick Carter. Carter has since filed a $2.5 million defamation counterclaim.

== Background ==
On April 8, 2019, the Backstreet Boys announced they would release a Christmas album. On an appearance on Watch What Happens Live! in February 2020, the Backstreet Boys reaffirmed that it was coming out, saying that they were negotiating with their record label. However, due to COVID-19, they could not begin production, and the album was delayed until 2021.

With their DNA World Tour postponed due to the COVID-19 pandemic, the Backstreet Boys started working on their first Christmas album in March 2021, and began recording on May 5, 2021. On July 12, they officially announced their return to Las Vegas for a holiday residency scheduled for November and December 2021. On August 11, Kevin Richardson announced they had finished recording vocals for a "top secret project," believed to be the Christmas album. On August 14, band member Nick Carter revealed that they had finished recording the album and had done a photo shoot for the album cover. However, due to the COVID-19 pandemic, the album failed to meet the production deadline, forcing them to reschedule the album to release in late 2022. The band also canceled their 2021 holiday residency in Las Vegas. The Backstreet Boys took inspiration from many artists while working on the album, such as Michael Bublé and Mariah Carey, with one of the original songs, "Happy Days," being inspired by former NSYNC member Justin Timberlake's "Can't Stop The Feeling."

== Promotion ==
"Last Christmas", a cover of Wham!'s 1984 hit, was issued on September 6, 2022 as the album’s lead single, followed by the release of its official music video on November 1. The Backstreet Boys' rendition peaked at number one on the US Adult Contemporary radio airplay chart, becoming the band's third topper on the chart, as well as their first number-one hit on it since "I Want It That Way", which reigned for 10 weeks beginning in July 1999.

In October 2022, songwriter Gary Baker revealed in an interview that one of the new songs he wrote for the album, "Christmas in New York", would serve as the album’s second single, with a brand new music video premiere in claymation. Released on December 6, 2022, the song reached number 19 on the US Adult Contemporary chart.

== Critical reception ==
Professional ratings
Review scores
Source	Rating
AllMusic	3.5/5 stars
The Arts Desk	1/5 stars
laut.de	2/5 stars

AllMusic editor Neil Z. Yeung rated the album three and a half stars out of five. He wrote that "with harmonies and vocal control honed over decades, the quintet's talents have aged like a fine mulled wine, which is apparent on A Very Backstreet Christmas [...] A trio of originals close the album, with 'Christmas in New York' bringing the nostalgic, technicolor magic of old and 'Together' and 'Happy Days' bridging their soul/R&B and dance-pop sides."

In a negative review, Barney Harsent of The Arts Desk wrote that "the album sounds about a tenth as interesting as that scenario suggests. Where we could have joy, we get a light dusting of saccharine sweetness; where we could have fun, we get earnest emoting; where we could have a knowing wink and a rimshot, we get poor pacing and worse phrasing." He rated the album one out of five stars and concluded: "This one gives absolutely nothing in return."

== Commercial performance ==
A Very Backstreet Christmas debuted and peaked at number 17 on the US Billboard 200, with first-week sales of 20,000 equivalent album units. While it was the band's first album to miss the chart’s top ten, it entered Billboard's Top Holiday Albums chart at number one. Elsewhere, A Very Backstreet Christmas reached the top five in Canada and the top ten in Germany, the Netherlands, Portugal, and the UK Independent Albums Chart.

== Track listing ==
A Very Backstreet Christmas track listing
No.	Title	Writer(s)	Producer(s)	Length
1.	"White Christmas"	Irving Berlin	Tommy Brown; Travis Sayles; Josh Conerly; Kuk Harrell^{[a]}	2:46
2.	"The Christmas Song"	Melvin Tormé; Robert Wells	Brown; Sayles; Conerly; Harrell^{[a]}	3:42
3.	"Winter Wonderland"	Felix Bernard; Richard B. Smith	Brown; Sayles; Tommy Parker; Harrell^{[a]}	1:41
4.	"Have Yourself a Merry Little Christmas"	Hugh Martin; Ralph Blane	Brown; Sayles; Conerly; Harrell^{[a]}	3:31
5.	"Last Christmas"	George Michael	Brown; Sayles; Conerly; Parker; Harrell^{[a]}	3:46
6.	"O Holy Night"	Placide Cappeau; Adolphe Adam; John Sullivan Dwight	Brown; Sayles; Harrell^{[a]}	3:28
7.	"This Christmas"	Donny Hathaway; Nadine McKinnor	Brown; Sayles; Conerly; Harrell^{[a]}	3:17
8.	"Same Old Lang Syne"	Dan Fogelberg	Brown; Sayles; Shintaro Yasuda; Harrell^{[a]}	4:26
9.	"Silent Night"	Franz Xaver Gruber; Joseph Mohr	Brown; Sayles; Harrell^{[a]}	2:43
10.	"I'll Be Home for Christmas"	Kim Gannon; Walter Kent; Buck Ram	Brown; Sayles; Conerly; Harrell^{[a]}	3:05
11.	"Christmas in New York"	Gary Baker; Greg Barnhill; Walt Aldridge	Baker	4:33
12.	"Together"	Darius Coleman; Parker; Kevin Richardson; Brian Littrell; AJ McLean; Howie Dorough; Nick Carter; Brown; Sayles	Brown; Sayles; Harrell^{[a]}	3:23
13.	"Happy Days"	Taylor Hill; Richardson; Littrell; McLean; Dorough; Carter; Brown; Sayles	Brown; Sayles; Taylor Hill^{[b]}; Harrell^{[a]}	3:20
Total length:				43:37

Deluxe edition bonus tracks
No.	Title	Writer(s)	Producer(s)	Length
14.	"Feliz Navidad"	José Feliciano	Brown; Conerly; Sayles; Harrell^{[a]}	2:52
15.	"It's Christmas Time Again"	Carter; Dorough; Mika Guillory; Morgan Taylor Reid	Reid	3:23
Total length:				49:53

Notes

- ^{^[a]} signifies a vocal producer
- ^{^[b]} signifies an additional producer

== Personnel ==
Backstreet Boys

- Nick Carter
- Howie Dorough
- Brian Littrell
- AJ McLean
- Kevin Richardson

Musicians

- Tommy Brown – programming (14), drums (12)
- Darius Coleman – vocal arrangements (2–9, 12)
- Josh Conerly – drums (1, 2, 4, 5, 7, 10)
- Tarron Crayton – bass (1, 2, 7)
- Taylor Hill – vocal arrangements (13)
- Elijah Kai – guitar (1, 4–10, 12, 13)
- Jeff King – guitar (11)
- Mark Mill – bass (11)
- Greg Morrow – drums (11)
- Tommy Parker – programming (3, 5), keyboards (5), vocal arrangements (1–5, 7, 10–14)
- Morgan Taylor Reid – all instruments (15)
- Travis Sayles – programming (1–10, 12, 13), keyboards (1, 2, 4–10, 12, 13), drums (6, 8, 9, 13), bass (4–6, 9, 10, 12, 13)
- Jason Webb – piano (11)
- Shintaro Yasuda – programming, keyboards, and bass (8)

Strings

- David Campbell – arranger and conductor (all but 11)
- Suzie Katayama – orchestra manager
- Alyssa Park (concertmaster), Charlie Bishart, Jackie Brand, Nina Evtuhov, Gerry Hilera, Songa Lee, Sara Parkins, Kerenza Peacock, Michele Richards, Neil Samples, Ashoka Thiagarajan, Shalini Vijayin, Jenny Takamatsu – violin
- Alma Fernandez, Luke Maurer, Rodney Wirth, Tom Lea – viola
- Jacob Braun, Paula Hochhalter, Hilary Smith, Erika Duke – cello
- Oscar Meza – bass
- Jerry Williams – arranger and engineer (11)

Technical personnel

- Chris Bethea – engineer (11)
- Tommy Brown – executive producer
- Kevin "KD" Davis – mixing
- Jelli Dorman – engineer
- Gene Grimaldi – mastering
- Kuk Harrell – engineer
- Ted Jensen – mastering (15)
- Morgan Taylor Reid – mixing (15)

== Charts ==
Chart performance for A Very Backstreet Christmas
Chart (2022)	Peak position
Austrian Albums (Ö3 Austria)	19
Belgian Albums (Ultratop Flanders)	14
Belgian Albums (Ultratop Wallonia)	58
Canadian Albums (Billboard)	5
Dutch Albums (Album Top 100)	6
German Albums (Offizielle Top 100)	9
Italian Albums (FIMI)	88
Japanese Albums (Oricon)	38
Japanese Digital Albums (Oricon)	34
Japanese Hot Albums (Billboard Japan)	51
Portuguese Albums (AFP)	8
Scottish Albums (Official Charts)	49
Spanish Albums (Promusicae)	22
Swiss Albums (Schweizer Hitparade)	13
Taiwanese Albums (G-Music)	5
UK Album Sales (OCC)	26
UK Album Downloads (Official Charts)	36
UK Independent Albums (Official Charts)	9
UK Physical Albums (OCC)	28
US Billboard 200	17

== Release history ==
Release history and formats for A Very Backstreet Christmas
Country	Date	Format(s)	Label	Ref.
Japan	November 9, 2022	CD	Warner Music Japan	
United States	October 14, 2022	CD	K-BAHN	
United States	December 2, 2022	LP	K-BAHN	
