= Made for You (Jake Owen song) =

Single by Jake Owen

from the album Greetings from... Jake
- Released: May 17, 2020
- Genre: Country
- Length: 3:58
- Label: Big Loud
- Songwriters: Benjy Davis; Joey Hyde; Neil Medley
- Producer: Joey Moi

Jake Owen singles chronology
"Homemade" (2019)	"Made for You" (2020)	"Best Thing Since Backroads" (2021)

"Made for You" is a song recorded by American country music singer Jake Owen. It is the fourth single from his sixth studio album Greetings from... Jake.

== Content ==
Before releasing the song to radio, Owen performed it at the wedding of country music singers Michael Ray and Carly Pearce on October 6, 2019. Owen had been given the song by a promoter. Songwriter Benjy Davis came up with the song's "descending guitar melody" in May 2017 and presented the idea to co-writers Joey Hyde and Neil Medley during a songwriting session that same month. The lyrics consist mainly of various thematically-related items that are "made for" each other.

"Made for You" was released to radio on May 17, 2020, one day after Owen performed the song on The Bachelorette.

== Music video ==
Owen filmed a music video for the song, which stars his girlfriend, Erica Hartlein, along with his two daughters.

== Critical reception ==
Zackary Kephart of Country Universe rated the song "C+", praising the instrumentation and Owen's voice, but criticizing the lyrics as "cliché".

== Controversy ==
On July 27, 2021, the song became the subject of a lawsuit by country artists Alexander Cardinale and Morgan Evans, who accused Owen of copyright infringement by lifting the lyrics and melody directly from their 2014 song (2016 single) of the same name. Owen has not publicly commented on the lawsuit.

== Charts ==
=== Weekly charts ===
Weekly chart performance for "Made for You"
Chart (2020–2021)	Peak position
Australia Country Hot 50 (TMN)	7
Canada Hot 100 (Billboard)	51
Canada Country (Billboard)	1
US Billboard Hot 100	32
US Country Airplay (Billboard)	1
US Hot Country Songs (Billboard)	3

=== Year-end charts ===
Year-end chart performance for "Made for You"
Chart (2021)	Position
US Country Airplay (Billboard)	28
US Hot Country Songs (Billboard)	29

== Certifications ==
Certifications for "Made for You"
Region	Certification	Certified units/sales
Canada (Music Canada)	Gold	40,000^{‡}
United States (RIAA)	Platinum	1,000,000^{‡}
^{‡} Sales+streaming figures based on certification alone.
