= Christmas Time (Backstreet Boys song) =

Promotional single by Backstreet Boys

from the album Quit Playing Games (With My Heart)
- Released: December 7, 1996
- Recorded: 1996
- Studio: Cheiron Studios (Stockholm, Sweden)
- Genre: Christmas
- Length: 4:17
- Label: Universal Music
- Songwriters: Veit Renn, Joe Smith, Johnny Wright
- Producer: Veit Renn

Music video
- "Christmas Time" (audio only) on YouTube

"Christmas Time" is a Christmas song by American vocal group Backstreet Boys. The song was written by Veit Renn, Joe Smith, and Johnny Wright. "Christmas Time" was included on the Christmas edition of "Quit Playing Games (With My Heart)" single and on a bonus disc included in some editions of Backstreet's Back album. The song was also featured on Platinum Christmas, a compilation album released by Jive Records in 2000, as well as many other Christmas compilation albums through the years.

The song premiered in Germany on December 7, 1996 when they appeared live on RTL and did their first performance of the song & it was released all over Europe. It was later released in the United States the following year. The boys later performed the song again when they attended Disney Parks Christmas Day Parade in December 1997. They also performed the song when they appeared on the yearly television special Christmas in Washington in 2013 when they performed a mashup of the song and It's Christmas Time Again.

== Charts ==
Chart (2018–2025)	Peak position
Estonia Airplay (TopHit)	53
Germany (GfK)	76

== Certifications ==
Region	Certification	Certified units/sales
Denmark (IFPI Danmark)	Gold	45,000^{‡}
^{‡} Sales+streaming figures based on certification alone.
