= Sammy Wilk =

American singer-songwriter

- Birth name: Samuel Howard Wilkinson
- Born: December 11, 1995 (age 29); Omaha, Nebraska
- Genres: Reggae fusion; Pop
- Occupation(s): Singer, songwriter and entrepreneur
- Instruments: Vocals; guitar
- Years active: 2013–present
- Labels: Freshlee Records
- Website: www.sammywilk.com

Sammy Wilk (born Samuel Howard Wilkinson; December 11, 1995) is an American internet personality, singer-songwriter and entrepreneur. Born and raised in Omaha, Nebraska, Wilk lived with his parents (Lori and Dave Wilkinson) and siblings (Annie, Emily and Benny Wilkinson). Sammy’s sister, Emily, is married to Tampa Bay Buccaneers quarterback Baker Mayfield. Wilk has since moved to Los Angeles, California. He developed a following on social media platform Vine in 2013, often working with acts such as Jack & Jack, Nash Grier, and others.

== Career ==
=== Social media ===
Wilk initially began his career in 2013 by collaborating on early Vine videos with Jack & Jack. He later joined them onboard the MAGCON tour in 2014 (Nash Grier, Cameron Dallas, Matt Espinosa, Shawn Mendes, Mahogany Lox, Taylor Caniff, Aaron Carpenter, Carter Reynolds, Jack Johnson, and Jack Gilinsky).

He's now currently amassed more than 1.7 million followers on Instagram, and nearly a million on Twitter

=== Music ===
==== Sammy and Skate ====
In 2014, Wilk began releasing music alongside Omaha-based artist Skate Maloley under the alias Sammy & Skate.

==== Solo career ====
In July 2015, Wilk released the music video for his pop-reggae single Aye Ma. The video garnered support from the likes of Nash Grier, Jack Johnson, and others. Wilk had hinted at the release of his debut EP, said to come out in December 2015, but it was announced that it was pushed back to sometime in 2016.

Wilk released his debut album, "Ready For War" on April 22, 2016. He released the title track video along with his hit single, Light Up featuring Ky-Mani Marley. In 2017, Wilk released singles Issues, Doesn't Make Sense, Let It Go, Way Up and Public Figure featuring Derek Luh. Wilk joined Derek Luh on the "Almost Broke" North American Tour in late 2017.

As an entrepreneur, Wilk also launched his clothing line, WILK Collection (exclusively sold on the website and pop-up shops), which features hats, hoodies, t-shirts and more. In addition, Wilk also created the WILK Project to help raise money and awareness for the children in Sierra Leone, Africa to build music and art programs.

== Discography ==
=== Singles ===
==== As lead artist ====
Title	Year	Peak chart positions	
Title	Year	US	US R&B
"Aye Ma"	2015	—	—
"Could Be"	2015	—	—
"Chase The Day"	2016	—	—
"Higher"	2016	—	—
"Light Up" ft Ky-Mani Marley	2016	—	—
"Ready For War"	2016	—	—
"Waterfall"	2016	—	—
"Way Up"	2017	—	—
"1 Life 2 Live"	2017	—	—
"Issues"	2017	—	—
"Let It Go"	2017	—	—

==== As Sammy and Skate ====
Title	Year	Peak chart positions	
Title	Year	US	US R&B
"Party People"	2014	—	—
"Wassup"	2015	—	—

=== Collaborations ===
Title	Year	Peak chart positions	
Title	Year	US	US R&B
"Best Mistake" (Cover) Karina Rae & Sammy Wilk	2014	—	—
"Nothing To A King" Sammy Wilk & Skate	2016	—	—
"Throw Signs" Sammy Wilk ft Jack & Jack	2016	—	— " In Between" Sammy Wilk ft JVCKJ
"Lady Devine" Garnet Silk, Jr. ft Sammy Wilk	2016	—	—

=== Music videos ===
Year	Title	Director	Notes
2014	"Best Mistake" (Cover) with Karina Rae		Ariana Grande & Big Sean
2014	"Wassup" Sammy & Skate	John Anthony Villalobos	
2015	"Aye Ma"	Justin Jones	Produced by Create TV
2015	"Nothing To A King" Sammy & Skate	John Anthony Villalobos	
2016	"Chase The Day"	Justin Jones	
2016	"Higher"	Justin Jones	
2016	"Light Up" ft Ky-Mani Marley	Justin Jones & Jesse Ray Diamond	
2016	"Ready For War"	Justin Jones & Jesse Ray Diamond	
2016	"Waterfall"	Justin Jones & Jesse Ray Diamond	
2016	"Lady Devine" (Remix) Garnet Silk, Jr. ft. Sammy Wilk	VPAL Music	
2017	"Way Up"	Nate Perry Films & Sammy Wilk	
2017	"1 Life 2 Live"	Alexander Mendeluk	
2017	"Let It Go"	Nate Perry Films & Sammy Wilk	
2019	"Lift Off"	Chris Velona	
