= Christmas in New York =

1979 Christmas song written by Billy Butt

Song by John Wesley Shipp
- Language: English
- Released: 1982
- Genre: Christmas
- Songwriter: Billy Butt

"Christmas in New York" is a Christmas song written by Billy Butt at the piano of the Church of Sweden in New York in 1979. It was recorded by John Wesley Shipp and released as a single in 1982, with "The Christmas Song" on its B-side. The English-language version was performed annually between 1986 and 2002 by the Rockettes during the Radio City Christmas Spectacular in New York City. Lyrically, the song describes New York City in Christmas time. It was recorded by Loa Falkman, as "It's Christmas in New York", on his 1990 Christmas album Julstämning.

== Backstreet Boys version ==
"Christmas in New York"

Single by Backstreet Boys

from the album A Very Backstreet Christmas
- Released: 6 December 2022
- Recorded: 2021
- Genre: Christmas; pop
- Length: 4:33
- Label: K-BAHN, BMG
- Songwriters: Gary Baker; Greg Barnhill; Walt Aldridge
- Producer: Gary Baker

Backstreet Boys singles chronology
"Last Christmas" (2022)	"Christmas in New York" (2022)	"Hey" (2025)

Music video
- "Christmas in New York" on YouTube

"Christmas in New York" is a Christmas song recorded in 2021 by Backstreet Boys. The song was released as a sneak peek preview on 1 December 2022 on JCPenney's Live Holiday Spectacular and premiered on 6 December 2022. It is the second single off the album A Very Backstreet Christmas.

The band's cover includes newly written lyrics by Gary Baker. The song's lyrics capture the spirit of Christmas in New York, with references to landmarks and the city's atmosphere.

=== Background ===
As part of their festive promotion, the Backstreet Boys had taken over the Pandora Billboard in Times Square. Reflecting on this exciting campaign, Angela Barkan, SVP of Marketing, NY, shared, "Normally us New Yorkers save the Times Square walks for the tourists… not this year. Going to the busiest area of NYC has never been more enjoyable, as we have two BMG artists on featured Billboards. Backstreet Boys are on the Pandora Billboard and Julia Wolf is on the Amazon Billboard. Hats off to our DSP team for securing these amazing looks at the most crowded time of the year!" This campaign was a testament to the band's enduring popularity and commitment to bringing their music to their fans in new and exciting ways.

=== Chart performance ===
Since its release, the album has met with critical acclaim and debuted at number one on Billboard's Top Holiday Albums chart and in the top 20 of the Billboard 200. It also held the number one spot on the Holiday Radio Charts. Besides the first single from the album, "Last Christmas", which peaked at number 1 on Holiday AC chart, "Christmas in New York" reached number 19 on the Billboard Holiday Streaming Songs.

=== Critical reception ===
The Backstreet Boys are feeling the Yuletide spirit with their new single, "Christmas in New York". However, according to Billboard, the "Christmas in New York" video is getting much attention.

=== Music video ===
The sweet and sentimental visual sees the quintet—Nick Carter, Howie Dorough, AJ McLean, Brian Littrell, and Kevin Richardson—passionately singing the holiday track while their claymation counterparts explore a sparkling New York City during Christmas—a throwback to claymation holiday movies such as Rudolph, Frosty the Snowman, and more. Jude Daniel Chacon directed the video, which was filmed inside and was the first music video in which all five members were dressed in holiday clothes. The music video was filmed along with the first video in the studio on August 17 - 18, 2022, and is dedicated to Jules Bass, who died in October.

The music video Christmas in New York is a hybrid of live-action and stop-motion animation, which sees the band performing the song on a decorated soundstage interspersed with claymation scenes of the group and a few colorful characters roaming the streets of New York City enjoying the holidays in the Big Apple. For most of the video, they visit Big Apple landmarks such as Times Square, Rockefeller Center, and Central Park. The claymation dolls of the boy group witness and participate in classic scenes. One features a Claymation Santa appearing with an elf at his side, ringing bells and asking for donations with a big red bucket. The dolls head down to the TV-decorated intersection of Times Square, take a horse-drawn carriage ride in Central Park, view the holiday windows at Macy’s 34th Street, and go ice-skating in Rockefeller Center.

=== Charts ===
Chart (2022)	Peak position
US Holiday Digital Song Sales (Billboard)	1
US Holiday Streaming Songs (Billboard)	19

== Other cover versions ==
- The Pointer Sisters record their cover in 2005 and the music video features the trio performing the song in front of an audience interspersed with footage featuring various New York City attractions.
- Lea Michele did a cover in 2019 and did a music video features Michele singing the song in a giant snow globe in Central Park and wandering around New York City.
- Rob Thomas in 2019.
- José James did his cover in 2021 and his music video features James singing the song at a church.
