= I Was Jack (You Were Diane) =

Single by Jake Owen

from the album Greetings from... Jake
- Released: March 12, 2018
- Genre: Country
- Length: 3:08
- Label: Big Loud
- Songwriters: Tommy Cecil; David Ray; Jody Stevens; Craig Wiseman; John Mellencamp
- Producer: Joey Moi

Jake Owen singles chronology
| "Good Company" (2017) | "I Was Jack (You Were Diane)" (2018) | "Down to the Honkytonk" (2018) |

"I Was Jack (You Were Diane)" is a song recorded by American country music singer Jake Owen. It was written by David Ray, Tommy Cecil, Jody Stevens, Craig Wiseman, and John Mellencamp, with production handled by Joey Moi. It is Owen's first single from his sixth studio album Greetings from... Jake.

== Content ==
The song is a tribute to John Mellencamp's 1982 single "Jack & Diane", and credits Mellencamp as a co-writer for incorporating that song's guitar riff. Rolling Stone writer Chris Parton described the song: "Owen's updated version highlights the original's impact on present-day America, while a regular Joe reminisces about falling in love to the tune years before." Owen said that he asked Mellencamp personally for permission to incorporate portions of "Jack & Diane" into the song, and recorded it after receiving Mellencamp's permission. Owen said that he wanted to record it because of the feelings of nostalgia that the lyrics evoked in him.

The song is Owen's first release on Big Loud Records, following a decade on RCA Records Nashville.

== Commercial performance ==
The song has sold 110,000 copies in the United States as of August 2018.

== Charts ==
=== Weekly charts ===
| Chart (2018) | Peak position |
|---|---|
| Canada (Canadian Hot 100) | 78 |
| Canada Country (Billboard) | 1 |
| US Billboard Hot 100 | 43 |
| US Country Airplay (Billboard) | 1 |
| US Hot Country Songs (Billboard) | 7 |

=== Year-end charts ===
| Chart (2018) | Position |
|---|---|
| US Country Airplay (Billboard) | 12 |
| US Hot Country Songs (Billboard) | 24 |
| US Radio Songs (Billboard) | 69 |

== Certifications ==
| Region | Certification | Certified units/sales |
|---|---|---|
| Canada (Music Canada) | Platinum | 80,000^{‡} |
| United States (RIAA) | Platinum | 1,000,000^{‡} |
^{‡} Sales+streaming figures based on certification alone.
