= Down to the Honkytonk =

Single by Jake Owen

from the album Greetings from... Jake
- Released: August 20, 2018
- Genre: Country
- Length: 3:03
- Label: Big Loud
- Songwriters: Rodney Clawson; Luke Laird; Shane McAnally
- Producer: Joey Moi

Jake Owen singles chronology
"I Was Jack (You Were Diane)" (2018)	"Down to the Honkytonk" (2018)	"Homemade" (2019)

"Down to the Honkytonk" is a song recorded by American country music singer Jake Owen. It is the second single from his sixth studio album Greetings from... Jake. The song was written by Rodney Clawson, Luke Laird, and Shane McAnally, and produced by Big Loud Records co-owner Joey Moi.

== History ==
"Down to the Honkytonk" was released on August 20, 2018, as Owen's second single for the Big Loud Records label. It is the followup to "I Was Jack (You Were Diane)", which reached the number one position on the Country Airplay chart earlier in 2018.

An article in The Boot said that the song is "[l]ed by a driving drum beat made for clapping and stomping along" and "finds Owen explaining that even if you're not rich and famous, there's still plenty to love about life". Taste of Country writer Billy Dukes said that the song had influences of Alabama and Nitty Gritty Dirt Band, while calling it a "big, easy, contagious romper". Owen told iHeartRadio that he wanted to record a song about honky-tonks because "A honky tonk is really just the place where you can go, have some beers with friends and listen to some good country music, and make memories and tell some good stories. And that's kind of right in my wheelhouse."

== Commercial performance ==
The song reached number seven on Billboard's Country Airplay for chart dated April 6, 2019. The song was certified Gold by the RIAA on June 20, 2019. It has sold 220,000 copies in the United States as of July 2019.

== Music video ==
The video was filmed on Lower Broadway in Nashville, Tennessee, and it features Owen visiting various bars along that street. Justin Clough and Ben Skipworth directed the video.

== Charts ==
=== Weekly charts ===
Chart (2018–2019)	Peak position
Canada Hot 100 (Billboard)	58
Canada Country (Billboard)	1
US Billboard Hot 100	65
US Country Airplay (Billboard)	7
US Hot Country Songs (Billboard)	9

=== Year-end charts ===
Chart (2018)	Position
US Hot Country Songs (Billboard)	90
Chart (2019)	Position
US Country Airplay (Billboard)	48
US Hot Country Songs (Billboard)	48

== Certifications ==
Region	Certification	Certified units/sales
Canada (Music Canada)	3× Platinum	240,000^{‡}
New Zealand (RMNZ)	Gold	15,000^{‡}
United States (RIAA)	2× Platinum	2,000,000^{‡}
^{‡} Sales+streaming figures based on certification alone.
