= I'm Alone, No You're Not =

Studio album by Joseph
- Released: August 26, 2016
- Genre: Indie pop; folk
- Label: ATO
- Producer: Mike Mogis

Joseph chronology
Native Dreamer Kin (2014)	I'm Alone, No You're Not (2016)	Stay Awake (2017)

Singles from I'm Alone, No You're Not
- 1. "White Flag" Released: May 24, 2016; 2. "SOS (Overboard)" Released: August 2, 2016

I'm Alone, No You're Not is the second studio album by American folk band Joseph. It was released by ATO Records on August 26, 2016, marking the trio's first full-length album release with the company. Produced by Mike Mogis, it reached number one on Billboard's Heatseekers Albums chart.

== Track listing ==
I'm Alone, No You're Not – Standard edition
No.	Title	Writer(s)	Length
1.	"Canyon"	Natalie Closner; Andrew Stonestreet	2:55
2.	"SOS (Overboard)"	Allison Closner; Meegan Closner; N. Closner; Teddy Geiger	3:05
3.	"Blood & Tears"	A. Closner; M. Closner; N. Closner; Morgan Taylor Reid	3:58
4.	"Hundred Ways"	N. Closner; Stonestreet	3:18
5.	"Planets"	A. Closner; M. Closner; N. Closner; Stonestreet	2:28
6.	"I Don't Mind"	A. Closner; M. Closner; N. Closner; Stonestreet	3:22
7.	"Whirlwind"	A. Closner; N. Closner; Marshall McLean	3:09
8.	"White Flag"	A. Closner; M. Closner; N. Closner; Morgan Taylor Reid	3:19
9.	"More Alive Than Dead"	A. Closner; M. Closner; N. Closner; Ethan Gruska	3:15
10.	"Honest"	M. Closner; N. Closner	2:48
11.	"Sweet Dreams"	A. Closner; M. Closner; Stonestreet	3:50

== Charts ==
Chart (2016)	Peak position
US Billboard 200	104
US Heatseekers Albums (Billboard)	1
US Independent Albums (Billboard)	9

== Release history ==
Region	Date	Format	Label
United States	August 26, 2016	Digital download, CD	ATO Records
