= Good Luck, Kid =

Studio album by Joseph
- Released: September 13, 2019
- Label: ATO
- Producer: Christian "Leggy" Langdon

Joseph chronology
Stay Awake (2017)	Good Luck, Kid (2019)	The Sun (2023)

Good Luck, Kid is the third studio album by American band Joseph. It was released by ATO Records on September 13, 2019. Produced by Christian "Leggy" Langdon, it reached number four on Billboard's Heatseekers Albums chart.

== Track listing ==
Good Luck, Kid – Standard edition
No.	Title	Length
1.	"Fighter"	3:41
2.	"Good Luck, Kid"	2:36
3.	"Green Eyes"	3:50
4.	"In My Head"	3:22
5.	"NYE"	3:33
6.	"Revolving Door"	3:50
7.	"Half Truths"	2:51
8.	"Presence"	2:51
9.	"Without You"	3:06
10.	"Side Effects"	3:43
11.	"Enough in Your Eyes"	3:47
12.	"Shivers"	3:47
13.	"Room for You"	3:02

== Charts ==
Chart (2019)	Peak position
US Heatseekers Albums (Billboard)	4
US Independent Albums (Billboard)	15

== Release history ==
Region	Date	Format	Label
United States	September 13, 2019	Digital download, CD	ATO Records
