= My Only Wish (This Year) =

2000 promotional single by Britney Spears

Promotional single by Britney Spears

from the album Platinum Christmas
- Released: November 6, 2020
- Recorded: August 2000
- Genre: Christmas; teen pop
- Length: 4:15
- Label: RCA
- Songwriters: Brian Kierulf; Josh Schwartz
- Producers: Brian Kierulf; Josh Schwartz

Audio video
- "My Only Wish (This Year)" on YouTube

"My Only Wish (This Year)" is a teen pop Christmas song by American singer Britney Spears. It was written and produced by Brian Kierulf and Josh Schwartz. It was included on the Christmas compilation album Platinum Christmas (2000). In the song, Spears asks Santa Claus to find her a lover during the holidays.

On November 6, 2020, the song was re-released as a promotional single on streaming platforms, twenty years after the album's release. On October 26, 2023, two versions were released for the song: a "Sped + Slowed" version as well as an "Instrumental + Karaoke" version. A lyric video of the song was released on November 24, 2025 on Spears' page on YouTube.

"My Only Wish (This Year)" received mixed reviews from contemporary music critics. However, in later re-evaluations reviewers have often considered the song a modern holiday classic. "My Only Wish (This Year)" has charted in various countries worldwide and on Billboard's Holiday charts.

== Background and composition ==
"My Only Wish (This Year)"
A 25-second sample of the song's chorus features Spears singing about her only wish.

On October 13, 2000, Forbes reported that Spears had plans to record a song called "My Only Wish (This Year)" for a Christmas album titled Platinum Christmas. The song was included on the album, which was released on November 14, 2000. "My Only Wish (This Year)" was written and produced by Brian Kierulf and Josh Schwartz. It is a teen pop song in the key of C major (it eventually modulates to D major) over a vocal range spanning from G_{3} to A_{5}. It runs in a fast shuffle rhythm, a rhythm pattern used mainly in jazz-influenced music. In the song, Spears laments her loneliness during the holidays and asks Santa Claus to bring her a lover, in lines such as "He's all I want, just for me/Underneath my Christmas tree". Since its release, the song has been included in more than eight Christmas music compilations, including Now That's What I Call Christmas! (2001), Super Christmas Hits (2006) and Christmas Top 100 (2009).

== Critical reception ==
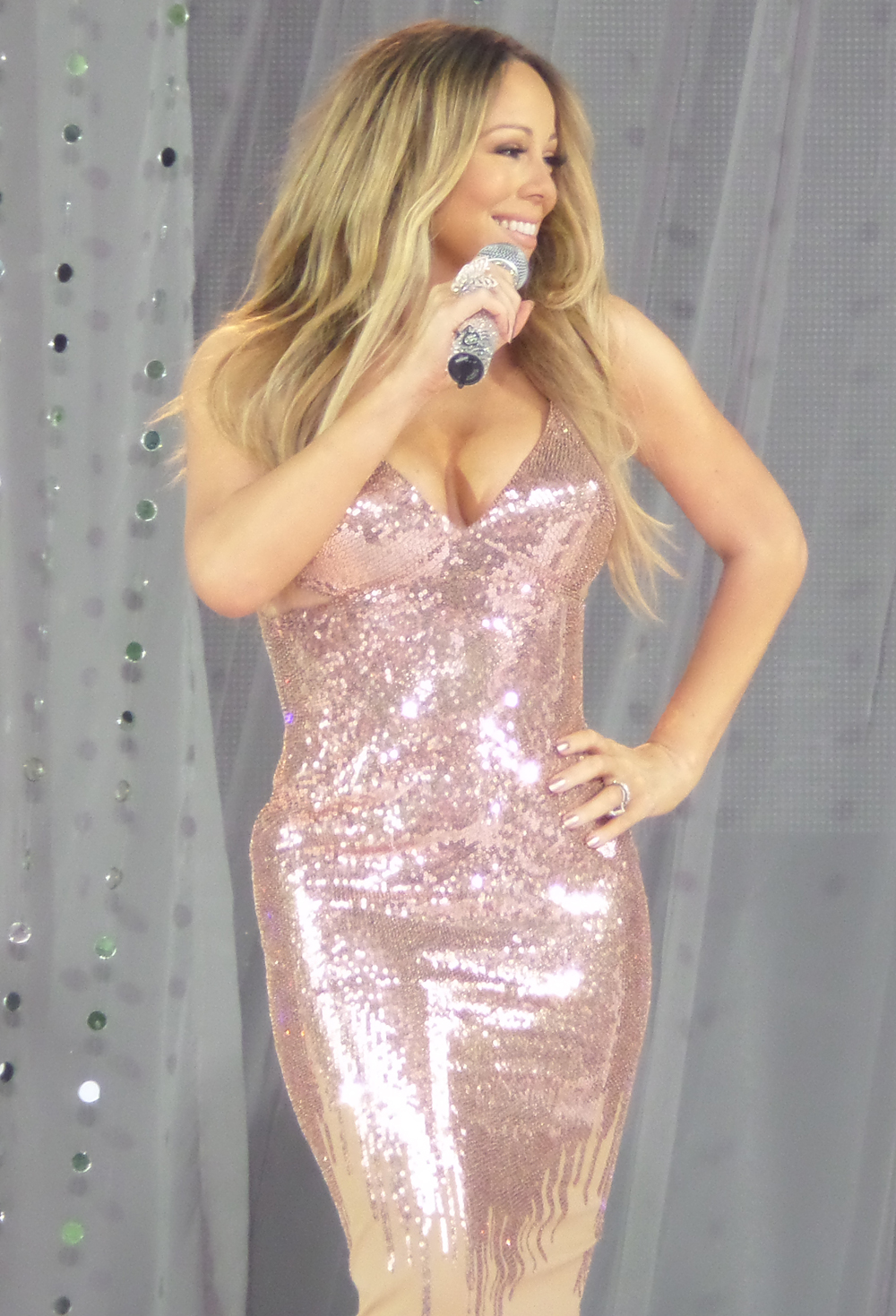
"My Only Wish (This Year)" received comparisons to Mariah Carey's 1994 hit single "All I Want for Christmas Is You".

Reviews in the first few years after the song's initial release were mixed. Michael Roberts, writing for the Dallas Observer in 2000, described the song as "an unobjectionable but generic retro bounce-fest", while Lori Reese of Entertainment Weekly called it "festive". In her 2001 review of Now That's What I Call Christmas!, Melissa Ruggieri of the Richmond Times-Dispatch commented, "Thankfully, only a small portion of disc two is devoted to tween magnets including Britney Spears ('My Only Wish [This Year]') and 'N Sync ('You Don't Have to Be Alone [On Christmas]')". AllMusic editor Stephen Thomas Erlewine, reviewing the same 2001 compilation album, counted the song among the album's "pop holiday classics." In his 2003 review of classic Christmas songs, The Sydney Morning Herald's Richard Jinman said that this track and Mariah Carey's 1994 single "All I Want for Christmas Is You" were "ho-ho-horrible singles."

By the early 2010s, critics were more unanimous in their positive praise for the song. Adam Graham of The Detroit News included the song in his list of top 10 Christmas songs released in the 21st century, writing that the "sleigh bells and holiday cheer abound on this bouncy teen-pop ditty, which follows in the tradition of Mariah Carey's 'All I Want for Christmas Is You.'" Sam Lansky included the song on his list of "Top 10 Original Christmas Pop Songs", writing, "another millennial teen pop jam, Britney Spears' 'My Only Wish (This Year)' follows the time-honored tradition of asking Santa Claus for love", and finding it "a sweet throwback to the simpler days of [Britney]". MTV blogger Tamar Anitai praised it as "the absolute holy grail of 1990s pop Christmas songs".

In 2021, the song was ranked as one of the 100 best Christmas songs of all time by Billboard.

== Chart performance ==
In the United States, the song made its first appearance on Billboard Holiday Airplay on December 8, 2001, debuting and peaking at number 7. It debuted on the Billboard Holiday Digital Songs Sales component chart at number 49 in 2010 as a result of digital downloads, and as of 2024 had peaked at number 12. In 2015, the song reached number 81 on the Billboard Holiday 100. On the Billboard Global 200 chart, the song peaked at number 68 on January 6, 2024.

"My Only Wish (This Year)" appeared for the first time in the Danish Singles Chart on December 26, 2008, as a result of digital downloads, debuting at number 34 before dropping off the chart in the following week. In the following year, it came back at number 37. A few years later, in 2014, it returned with a new peak at number 29, and spend two additional weeks on the charts in 2016. Since 2017, it charted yearly for multiple weeks per year, where it also reached its current peak at number 14. It is Spears' longest-running single in the country with 52 weeks on the charts and has since been certified triple platinum by IFPI Danmark.

It charted in Slovakia, on December 28, 2009, at number 54. On December 8, 2011, "My Only Wish (This Year)" debuted at number 170 on South Korea's International Download Circle Chart, following digital sales of 3,671 copies. On December 17, 2011, it sold 13,670 copies. On the International Comprehensive Tracks component chart, it peaked at number 34.

In 2015, the song had its first appearance on the German Singles Chart, debuting at number 90. Up until 2025, it charted yearly and reached its peak at number 21 in 2024. In 2022, it was certified gold by the Bundesverband Musikindustrie (BVMI) for selling 250,000 units. In the United Kingdom, the single entered the UK Singles Chart on December 24, 2021 for the first time at number 97. A week later, it reached number 82. "My Only Wish (This Year)" returned to the chart in December 2022 for three weeks reaching number 68 on January 5, 2023. Boosted by popularity during the 2023 christmas season, the song re-entered the chart at number 89 at December 14, 2023 and reached its highest peak so far at number 59 on January 4, 2024. This marked Spears' first song on the UK Singles Chart since "Make Me" in July 2016, which peaked at 42. In 2026, it was certified platinum by the British Phonographic Industry (BPI) for selling 600,000 units.

== Cover versions and usage in media ==
In 2009, Brazilian singer and TV host Xuxa released a Portuguese version of "My Only Wish (This Year)", titled as "Papai Noel Existe", on her Christmas album Natal Mágico. In 2019, NCT's Jaehyun and April's Lee Na-eun covered the song on an Inkigayo special. In 2020, Meghan Trainor covered the song for her Christmas album A Very Trainor Christmas. RuPaul's Drag Race finalists Tia Kofi and Priyanka released a duet version of the song in 2022. Thai singer Lisa released a cover of the song in 2023, along with a music video.

The song is featured in the 2021 Christmas Netflix film, Single All the Way.

== Track listings ==
- Digital download and streaming
1. "My Only Wish (This Year)" – 4:15
- Digital download and streaming (Sped + Slowed)
1. "My Only Wish (This Year)" (Slowed & Reverb) – 4:50
2. "My Only Wish (This Year)" (Sped Up) – 3:43
- Digital download and streaming (Instrumental + Karaoke)
1. "My Only Wish (This Year)" (Instrumental) – 4:15
2. "My Only Wish (This Year)" (Karaoke) – 4:15

== Credits and personnel ==
- Britney Spears – lead vocals, background vocals
- Brian Kierulf – songwriting, production
- Josh Schwartz – songwriting, production
- Jennifer Karr – background vocals
- Audrey Martells - background vocals

== Charts ==
=== Weekly charts ===
Weekly Chart performance for "My Only Wish (This Year)"
| Chart (2000–2026) | Peak position |
|---|---|
| Australia (ARIA) | 63 |
| Austria (Ö3 Austria Top 40) | 28 |
| Canada Hot 100 (Billboard) | 49 |
| CIS Airplay (TopHit) | 122 |
| Croatia International Airplay (Top lista) | 11 |
| Croatia Christmas International Airplay (Top lista) | 9 |
| Denmark (Tracklisten) | 14 |
| Estonia Airplay (TopHit) | 48 |
| Finland (Suomen virallinen lista) | 39 |
| France (SNEP) | 84 |
| Germany (GfK) | 21 |
| Global 200 (Billboard) | 54 |
| Greece International (IFPI) | 57 |
| Hungary (Single Top 40) | 32 |
| Hungary (Stream Top 40) | 35 |
| Ireland (IRMA) | 47 |
| Lithuania (AGATA) | 44 |
| Netherlands (Single Top 100) | 29 |
| Poland Airplay (ZPAV) | 20 |
| Poland (Polish Streaming Top 100) | 42 |
| Portugal (AFP) | 93 |
| Romania Airplay (TopHit) | 142 |
| Slovakia Airplay (ČNS IFPI) | 54 |
| South Korea (Gaon Digital Chart) | 145 |
| South Korea International Singles (Gaon) | 16 |
| Sweden (Sverigetopplistan) | 41 |
| Switzerland (Schweizer Hitparade) | 24 |
| UK Singles (Official Charts) | 59 |
| Ukraine Airplay (TopHit) | 32 |
| US Holiday 100 (Billboard) | 81 |

=== Monthly charts ===
Monthly chart performance for "My Only Wish (This Year)"
| Chart (2010–2024) | Peak position |
|---|---|
| South Korea Foreign (Circle) | 34 |
| Ukraine Airplay (TopHit) | 87 |

== Certifications and sales ==
Certifications and sales for "My Only Wish (This Year)"
| Region | Certification | Certified units/sales |
|---|---|---|
| Australia (ARIA) | Gold | 35,000^{‡} |
| Denmark (IFPI Danmark) | 3× Platinum | 270,000^{‡} |
| Germany (BVMI) | Gold | 250,000^{‡} |
| New Zealand (RMNZ) | Gold | 15,000^{‡} |
| South Korea (Gaon) | — | 66,198 |
| United Kingdom (BPI) | Platinum | 600,000^{‡} |
| United States (RIAA) | Gold | 500,000^{‡} |
^{‡} Sales+streaming figures based on certification alone.

== Release history ==
Release dates and formats for "My Only Wish (This Year)"
| Region | Date | Format(s) | Version(s) | Label | Ref. |
|---|---|---|---|---|---|
| Various | November 6, 2020 | Digital download; streaming | Original | RCA | |
| United States | November 12, 2020 | Vinyl (Urban Outfitters exclusive) | Original | RCA | |
| United States | January 15, 2021 | Vinyl (Green Marble Amazon exclusive) | Original | RCA | |
| Various | October 26, 2023 | Digital download; streaming | Sped; slowed | RCA | |
| Various | October 26, 2023 | Digital download; streaming | Instrumental; karaoke | RCA | |
