= It's Christmas Time Again =

Single by Backstreet Boys

from the album A Very Backstreet Christmas
- Released: November 6, 2012
- Recorded: October 18, 2012; Los Angeles, CA
- Genre: Pop, Christmas
- Length: 3:23
- Label: K-BAHN
- Songwriters: Nick Carter, Howie Dorough, Mika Guillory, Morgan Taylor Reid
- Producer: Morgan Taylor Reid

Backstreet Boys singles chronology
"Don't Turn Out the Lights" (2011)	"It's Christmas Time Again" (2012)	"In a World Like This" (2013)

"It's Christmas Time Again" is a Christmas song by the American vocal group Backstreet Boys. The song was written by Backstreet Boys members Nick Carter and Howie Dorough along with Mika Guillory and Morgan Taylor Reid in early October 2012. It is the first song by the Backstreet Boys to feature Kevin Richardson's vocals in six years. Richardson left the group in 2006 and rejoined in 2012. It is also the first song released under the group's own label, K-BAHN. It's also their second seasonal song following their original Christmas song "Christmas Time," which was released 16 years after it.

A sneak preview of "It's Christmas Time Again" was posted on the group's official website on November 1, 2012, and AOL Music premiered the whole song on November 5, 2012. "It's Christmas Time Again" was released digitally on November 6, 2012. The Backstreet Boys performed the song publicly for the first time on November 4, 2012, at the taping of Disney Parks Christmas Day Parade at Disneyland. On November 14, 2012, the group debuted the song on national TV on The Talk, and on December 19, 2012, they performed the song on Late Night with Jimmy Fallon.

In December 2013, the Backstreet Boys performed this song in the annual "Christmas in Washington" TV special, which was also attended by the President of the United States Barack Obama and his family.

After ten years, it appears on the group's first-holiday album, A Very Backstreet Christmas.

== Background ==
The Backstreet Boys had been working on their eighth studio album since mid-2012. They originally aimed to have something out before the end of the year, but later pushed back the release date for the single to early 2013. When they got the opportunity to perform at Disney Parks Christmas Day Parade, Disney gave them the option to sing their previous original Christmas song "Christmas Time" or a classic, but they figured they would write a new Christmas song instead which would also serve as a gift to their fans while they're waiting for the new album. Dorough and Carter wrote the song in early October 2012 with Morgan Taylor Reid and Mika Guillory in about two hours. Within a week, they had the song demoed, written, and recorded by the rest of the Backstreet Boys members. They then presented it to Disney, who quickly approved it.

== Critical reception ==
Artistdirect gave the song a positive review and 5 out of 5 stars, describing the song as a "timeless Christmas anthem" with a smooth acoustic guitar build-up, resounding bells, and soaring five-part harmonies. Entertainment Weekly also gave the song a positive review, noting that the song has a catchy tune, a little "boy band hook," and a five-part harmony.

Listicles for "It's Christmas Time Again"
Publication	List	Rank	Ref.
Billboard	10 Best Boy Band Christmas Songs	Placed	

== Charts ==
The song peaked at No. 1 on Billboard's Holiday Digital Songs chart in November 2012.

Chart (2012)	Peak position
Japan (Japan Hot 100)	38
US Holiday Digital Songs (Billboard)	1

== Music video ==
The music video for this song is animated and premiered on Artist Direct. It features the members of the Backstreet Boys as cartoon characters. It follows the story of a couple who grow old together and how they spend Christmas over the years.
