= Platinum Christmas =

Compilation album by Various artists
- Released: November 14, 2000
- Genre: Christmas
- Length: 105:40
- Label: Jive
- Producer: Brian Kierulf

Professional ratings
Review scores
Source	Rating
AllMusic	3/5 stars
The Village Voice	(dud)

Platinum Christmas is a 2000 holiday album released by Jive Records on November 14, 2000. "My Gift to You" by Donell Jones appears only in the North American release, in the rest of the world Jones's song has been replaced by "Perfect Christmas" by S Club 7.

It was followed with two further compilations, Platinum Christmas II in 2004, and Platinum Christmas III in 2006, both were released in Canada only.

== Singles ==
"My Only Wish (This Year)", by Britney Spears, was released as promotional single on November 14, 2000. The song appeared in the Danish Singles Chart on December 26, 2008 and peaking at number 14 in 2017. It charted in Slovakia, on December 28, 2009, at number 54. It made its first appearance on Billboard Holiday/Seasonal Digital Songs on November 27, 2010, peaking at number 49 as a result of digital downloads. On December 3, 2010, Nielsen SoundScan reported that there had so far been 162,000 paid digital downloads of the song in the United States.

"Perfect Christmas" by S Club 7 was released as promotional single in United Kingdom on November 15, 2000.

== Track listing ==
=== North America ===
- This version, with "My Gift to You" by Donell Jones, was released only in United States and Canada.

No.	Title	Writer(s)	Recording Artist(s)	Length
1.	"My Only Wish (This Year)"	Brian Kierulf; Josh Schwartz	Britney Spears	4:15
2.	"Grown-Up Christmas List"	David Foster; Linda Thompson-Jenner	Monica featuring Plus One	4:20
3.	"This Christmas"	Donny Hathaway; Hathaway McKinnor	Joe	3:06
4.	"I Don't Wanna Spend One More Christmas Without You"	Andrew Fromm; J. Franzel; S. Linzer	NSYNC	4:02
5.	"Silent Night"	Franz Xaver Gruber; Joseph Mohr	Christina Aguilera	4:49
6.	"Posada (Pilgrimage To Bethlehem)"	B. Rietveld	Santana	5:22
7.	"Little Drummer Boy"	Harry Simeone; Henry Onorati; Katherine Davis	Jars of Clay	4:20
8.	"Christmas Song"	Dave Matthews	Dave Matthews	4:59
9.	"Christmas Day"	Dido Armstrong; Rollo Armstrong	Dido	4:02
10.	"Merry X-Mas Everybody"	Jim Lea; N. Holder	Steps	3:38
11.	"Christmas Time"	J. Smith; J. Wright; Veit Renn	Backstreet Boys	4:16
12.	"World Christmas"	R. Kelly	R. Kelly	4:03
13.	"My Gift to You"	James Harris; S.T. Lewis	Donell Jones	3:41
14.	"Sleigh Ride"	Leroy Anderson; Mitchell Parish	TLC	3:44
15.	"The Christmas Song"	Mel Tormé; Robert Wells	Toni Braxton	3:25
16.	"Who Would Imagine a King"	Hill, H. Hilton; M. Warren	Whitney Houston	3:31

=== International ===
- This version, with "Perfect Christmas" by S Club 7, was released in Europe, South America, Asia and Oceania.

No.	Title	Writer(s)	Recording Artist(s)	Length
1.	"My Only Wish (This Year)"	Brian Kierulf; Josh Schwartz	Britney Spears	4:15
2.	"Perfect Christmas"	Cathy Dennis, Simon Ellis	S Club 7	4:34
3.	"I Don't Wanna Spend One More Christmas Without You"	Andrew Fromm; J. Franzel; S. Linzer	NSYNC	4:02
4.	"Merry X-Mas Everybody"	Jim Lea; N. Holder	Steps	3:38
5.	"Grown-Up Christmas List"	David Foster; Linda Thompson-Jenner	Monica featuring Plus One	4:20
6.	"World Christmas"	R. Kelly	R. Kelly	4:03
7.	"Silent Night"	Franz Xaver Gruber; Joseph Mohr	Christina Aguilera	4:49
8.	"Posada (Pilgrimage To Bethlehem)"	B. Rietveld	Santana	5:22
9.	"Little Drummer Boy"	Harry Simeone; Henry Onorati; Katherine Davis	Jars of Clay	4:20
10.	"Christmas Song"	Dave Matthews	Dave Matthews	4:59
11.	"Christmas Day"	Dido Armstrong; Rollo Armstrong	Dido	4:02
12.	"Christmas Time"	J. Smith; J. Wright; Veit Renn	Backstreet Boys	4:16
13.	"This Christmas"	Donny Hathaway; Hathaway McKinnor	Joe	3:06
14.	"Sleigh Ride"	Leroy Anderson; Mitchell Parish	TLC	3:44
15.	"The Christmas Song"	Mel Tormé; Robert Wells	Toni Braxton	3:25
16.	"Who Would Imagine a King"	Hill, H. Hilton; M. Warren	Whitney Houston	3:31

== Charts ==
=== Weekly charts ===
Chart (2000)	Peak position
US Billboard 200	32
US Top Holiday Albums (Billboard)	3

=== Year-end charts ===
Year-end chart performance for Platinum Christmas
Chart (2000)	Position
Canadian Albums (Nielsen SoundScan)	186
South Korean International Albums (MIAK)	50

Chart (2001)	Position
US Billboard 200	182

== Certifications ==
Region	Certification	Certified units/sales
South Korea	—	49,187
United States (RIAA)	Platinum	1,000,000^{^}
^{^} Shipments figures based on certification alone.
