= Greetings from... Jake =

Studio album by Jake Owen
- Released: March 29, 2019
- Genre: Country
- Length: 45:43
- Label: Big Loud
- Producers: Joey Moi (all tracks); Dave Cohen (tracks 2,3,9,11,13,14)

Jake Owen chronology
Greatest Hits (2017)	Greetings from... Jake (2019)	Loose Cannon (2023)

Singles from Greetings from... Jake
- 1. "I Was Jack (You Were Diane)" Released: March 12, 2018; 2. "Down to the Honkytonk" Released: August 20, 2018; 3. "Homemade" Released: June 3, 2019; 4. "Made for You" Released: May 18, 2020

Greetings from... Jake is the sixth studio album by American country music singer Jake Owen. It was released on March 29, 2019, through Big Loud Records. The album is produced by Joey Moi. It is Owen's first album with the label after leaving RCA Records Nashville in 2017. The album was preceded by the singles "I Was Jack (You Were Diane)" and "Down to the Honkytonk", both released in 2018.

== Background ==
Owen wanted the theme of the record to be appreciation of his home state of Florida, as well as a "pure representation of who I am, where I've been, what I love and where I am going", calling it a "fresh hello from a point in my career where I feel so comfortable and fulfilled".

== Promotion ==
Owen announced the title on his social media accounts in late February 2019 before posting the full cover art on March 1, which resembles a postcard depicting "everything Florida has to offer", including palm trees, oranges, and a sailboat. The cover art and title is similar to Bruce Springsteen’s 1973 debut album, Greetings from Asbury Park, N.J.

== Commercial performance ==
The album debuted at No. 8 on Billboard's Top Country Albums chart, selling 4,000 copies in the first week. It has sold 7,700 copies in the United States as of July 2019.

== Track listing ==
No.	Title	Writer(s)	Length
1.	"Down to the Honkytonk"	Luke Laird; Rodney Clawson; Shane McAnally	3:03
2.	"Ain't Here to Talk"	Jesse Frasure; Brett Tyler; Hardy	3:41
3.	"Catch a Cold One"	Jon Nite; Josh Thompson; Justin Ebach	2:50
4.	"I Was Jack (You Were Diane)"	Craig Wiseman; David Ray; Jody Stevens; John Mellencamp; Tommy Cecil	3:08
5.	"Grass Is Always Greener" (featuring Kid Rock)	Ben Burgess; Jaren Johnston; Robert Ritchie; Alysa Vanderheym	3:08
6.	"Homemade"	Bobby Pinson; Drew Parker; Jared Mullins; Ben Goldsmith	3:12
7.	"Drink All Day"	Daniel Ross; Ernest K. Smith; Brian Kelley; Josh Miller	2:59
8.	"That's on Me"	Laura Veltz; Benjy Davis; Matt Dragstrem	2:55
9.	"Señorita" (featuring Lele Pons)	Nolan Sipe; Nathan Spicer; Ben Caver	3:00
10.	"In It"	Jimmy Robbins; Thompson; Veltz	3:09
11.	"River of Time"	Dallas Davidson; Ben Hayslip; Marv Green	2:50
12.	"Made for You"	Davis; Joey Hyde; Neil Medley	3:58
13.	"Mexico in Our Minds"	Johnston; Chris DeStefano; Ashley Gorley	3:41
14.	"Damn"	David Lee Murphy; Jake Owen; Brett James	4:09
Total length:			45:43

== Charts ==
=== Weekly charts ===
Chart (2019)	Peak position
Australian Digital Albums (ARIA)	27
Canadian Albums (Billboard)	70
US Billboard 200	65
US Top Country Albums (Billboard)	8

=== Year-end charts ===
Chart (2019)	Position
US Top Country Albums (Billboard)	91
Chart (2020)	Position
US Top Country Albums (Billboard)	77
Chart (2021)	Position
US Top Country Albums (Billboard)	83

== Certifications ==
Region	Certification	Certified units/sales
Canada (Music Canada)	Gold	40,000^{‡}
United States (RIAA)	Gold	500,000^{‡}
^{‡} Sales+streaming figures based on certification alone.
