= A Good Friend Is Nice =

Studio album by Jack & Jack
- Released: January 25, 2019
- Recorded: February–December 2018
- Genre: Pop
- Length: 38:42
- Label: Island
- Producer: Big Taste; Jacob Manson; Jussifer; Ryan OG; Gladius; NGHTxNGHT; Cook Classics; Morgan Taylor Reid; Jerrod Bettis; Jonas Blue

Jack & Jack chronology
Gone (2017)	A Good Friend Is Nice (2019)

Singles from A Good Friend Is Nice
- 1. "No One Compares to You" Released: October 5, 2018; 2. "Tension" Released: January 11, 2019

A Good Friend Is Nice is the debut studio album by American pop-rap duo Jack & Jack. It was released on January 25, 2019 via Island Records. The album was supported by an accompanying tour named Good Friends Are Nice.

== Background ==
The duo shared on their Instagram pages the album cover, a photo of them from their time in kindergarten, featuring the handwriting of five-year-old Johnson and the date 1-11-02.

== Singles ==
The album's lead single "No One Compares to You" was released on October 5, 2018. Jonas Blue's single "Rise" (which features the duo) is also included. The following single from A Good Friend Is Nice, "Tension", was released on January 11, 2019.

== Track listing ==
Track listing adapted from iTunes. Credits adapted from Tidal.

No.	Title	Writer(s)	Producer(s)	Length
1.	"No One Compares to You"	Jake Torrey; Michael Matosic; Thomas Barnes; Peter Kelleher; Benjamin Kohn; Jussi Karvinen	TMS; Jussifer	3:02
2.	"Lotta Love"	Adam Argyle; Jacob Manson; Andrew Jackson	Jacob Manson; Jussifer	2:50
3.	"Barcelona"	Jack Gilinsky; Jack Edward Johnson; Ryan Ogren; Jake Torrey	Ryan OG	2:44
4.	"April Gloom"	Gilinsky; Johnson; Ogren	Ryan OG	3:02
5.	"Promise Me"	James Wong; James John Abrahart Jr.; Andrew Jackson	Gladius	3:38
6.	"Pose"	William Mosgrove; Gilinsky; Johnson; James Alexander Hau	NGHTxNGHT	2:45
7.	"Used to You Now"	Stephenie Jones; Gilinsky; Johnson; Colin Munroe; Leroy Clampitt	Big Taste	3:11
8.	"Day Dreaming"	Gilinsky; Johnson; William Lobban-Bean; Katie Pearlman; Jason Reeves	Cook Classics	3:31
9.	"Meet U in the Sky"	Gilinsky; Johnson; Johan Fransson; Morgan Taylor Reid	Morgan Taylor Reid	3:14
10.	"Tension"	Jones; Gilinsky; Johnson; Jerrod Bettis	Jerrod Bettis	3:42
11.	"2 Cigarettes"	Gilinsky; Johnson; Ogren; Jeff Halavacs	Halatrax; Ryan OG	3:49
12.	"Rise" (Jonas Blue featuring Jack & Jack)	Guy James Robin; Samuel Romans; Edward Drewett	Jonas Blue	3:14
Total length:				38:42

== Charts ==
Chart (2019)	Peak position
Australian Digital Albums (ARIA)	36
Belgian Albums (Ultratop Flanders)	124
