= Wild Life (Jack & Jack song) =

Single by Jack & Jack

Single by Jack & Jack
- Released: 2 August 2014
- Recorded: 2014
- Genre: Urban pop; pop-rap; trap
- Length: 2:55
- Songwriter(s): Jack Johnson; Jack; cornelias D Mcelrath; Gilinsky; Rami Jrade; Jordan Palmer
- Producer(s): Jordan Palmer

Jack & Jack singles chronology
"Doing It Right" (2014)	"Wild Life" (2014)	"Cold Hearted" (2014)

"Wild Life" is a single by Jack & Jack, released on 2 August 2014. The official music video produced by theAudience and directed by Niklaus Lange was premiered 31 October 2014. The song managed to peak at number 87 on the Billboard Hot 100.

== Charts ==
Chart (2014)	Peak; position
US Billboard Hot 100	87
US Hot R&B/Hip-Hop Songs (Billboard)	25
