= Calibraska (EP) =

EP by Jack & Jack
- Released: July 24, 2015
- Recorded: 2015
- Genre: Hip hop
- Label: Independent
- Producer: Matt Squire; Steve Tippeconnic; Jordan Palmer; Cornelias D Mcelrath

Jack & Jack chronology
Calibraska (2015)	Gone (2017)

Calibraska is an extended play (EP) by the American pop-rap duo Jack & Jack. Their debut EP was independently released via the Philip J. Kaplan digital music distributor DistroKid on July 24, 2015. The title is a portmanteau of the U.S. states Nebraska, where the duo originate, and California, where they are now based. Within hours of its release, Calibraska charted at number 1 on the U.S. iTunes albums chart ahead of DS2 by Future and 1989 by Taylor Swift.

== Track list ==
EP
No.	Title	Writer(s)	Producer(s)	Length
1.	"California"	Jack Johnson; Jack Gilinsky; Jordan Palmer; Matt Squire; Steve Tippeconnic	Squire, Tippeconnic, Palmer	3:16
2.	"Shallow Love"	Johnson; Gilinsky; Palmer	Palmer	2:53
3.	"How We Livin"	Johnson; Gilinsky; Squire; Tippeconnic	Tippeconnic, Squire	3:11
4.	"Wrong One"	Johnson; Gilinsky; Palmer; Aaron Jennings	Palmer	4:27
Total length:				13:47

== Charts ==
=== Weekly charts ===
Chart (2015)	Peak position
Canadian Albums (Billboard)	14
French Albums (SNEP)	166
US Billboard 200	12
US Independent Albums (Billboard)	3
US Top R&B/Hip-Hop Albums (Billboard)	5

=== Year-end charts ===
Chart (2015)	Position
US Top R&B/Hip-Hop Albums (Billboard)	96
