= Joseph (band) =

American folk music group

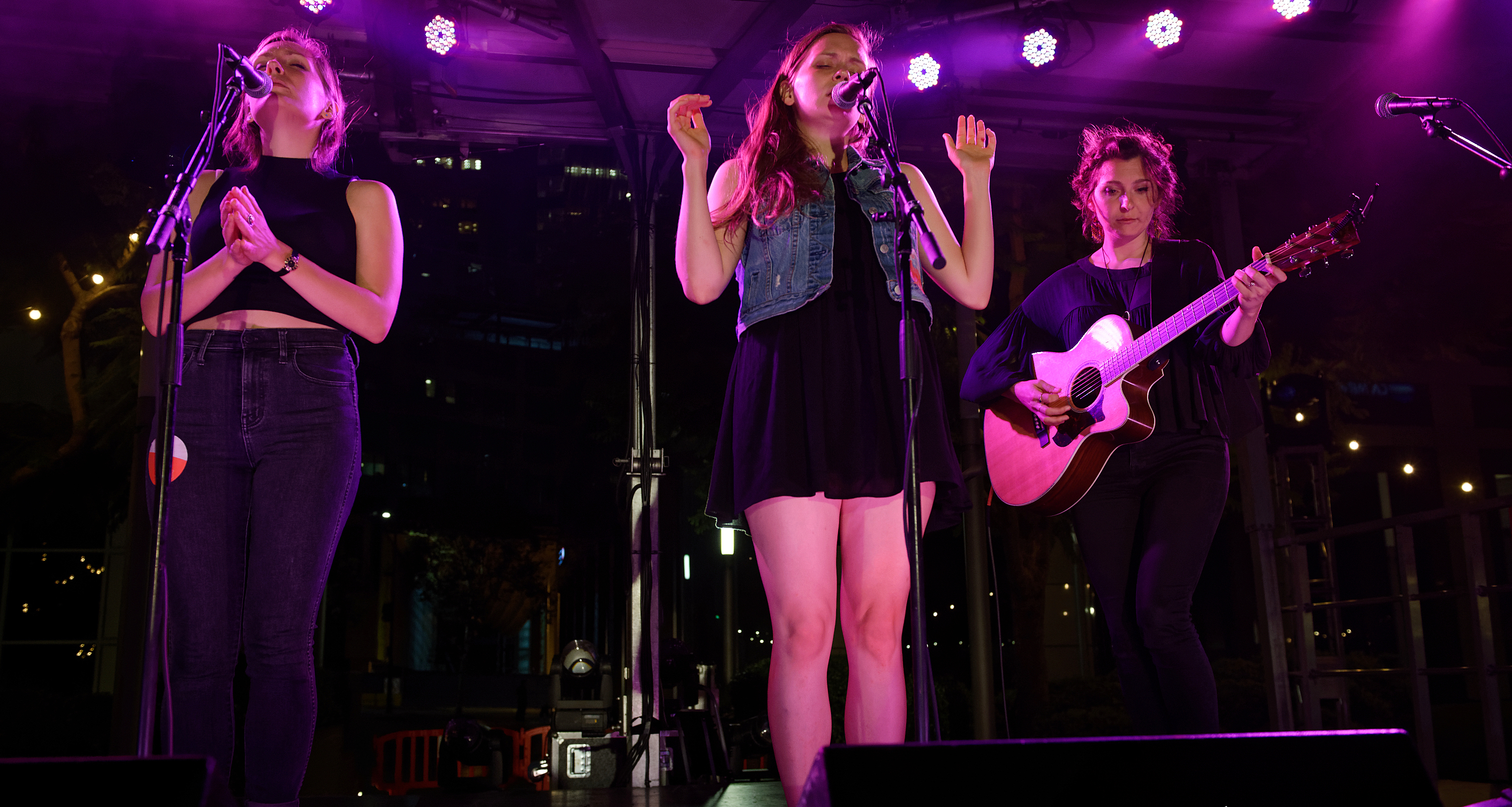
- Joseph performing in 2016.

Background information
- Origin: Portland, Oregon, United States
- Genres: Pop; folk
- Years active: 2014–present
- Labels: ATO; PIAS
- Members: Natalie Closner; Allison Closner; Meegan Closner
- Website: thebandjoseph.com

Joseph is an American folk band from Portland, Oregon made up of three sisters: Natalie Closner, and twins Allison Closner and Meegan Closner. Their first album, Native Dreamer Kin, was self-released in early 2014. Their second album I'm Alone, No You're Not was produced by Mike Mogis and was released on August 26, 2016, by ATO Records.

== History ==
=== Founding and Native Dreamer Kin ===
Joseph was formed when Natalie Closner, who had been pursuing a solo singer-songwriter career, recruited her younger twin sisters Meegan and Allison to join her on vocals for a new project. They chose their name as a tribute to the town of Joseph, Oregon and their grandfather Jo. Originally performing under a different name, a label representative said the name did not match the gravitas of their songwriting; they had just been camping in Joseph, a regular activity for them, and decided on the name. They self-released their debut album Native Dreamer Kin in 2014, and built a following playing intimate house shows as a trio accompanied by acoustic guitar and foot drum.

=== I'm Alone, No You're Not ===
Joseph were signed to ATO Records in 2015, releasing an acoustic two-song digital ATO Sessions EP and accompanying video series. In 2015, they recorded I'm Alone, No You're Not with producer Mike Mogis. The album was released on August 26, 2016. It debuted at #1 on Billboard's Heatseekers chart and remained at the top of the chart for two weeks. They released their first single, "White Flag", on May 24, 2016, with a premiere on NPR's Songs We Love. "White Flag" reached No. 1 on the Adult Alternative Songs chart in October 2016, and charted on Spotify's US Viral Top Ten days after its release. In Fall 2016, Joseph launched an a cappella covers contest, which included submissions from fans, amateur musicians, and college a cappella groups.

The band made their television debut performing "White Flag" on The Tonight Show Starring Jimmy Fallon, followed by appearances on Later... with Jools Holland, Ellen, CONAN, CBS This Morning, and NBC's TODAY. Prior to the album's release, the band was named a Spotify Spotlight Artist and toured with James Bay. The band re-joined Bay as support on a sold-out arena tour in Fall 2016. Joseph has performed both as an acoustic trio and a full band at music festivals across the globe including Coachella, Lollapalooza, Bonnaroo, Newport Folk Festival, Sasquatch Festival, Glastonbury, Outside Lands Music and Arts Festival, Pilgrimage Music Festival and more.

They released a seven track EP, Stay Awake, on September 15, 2017.

=== Good Luck, Kid ===
On July 9, 2019, the band announced on social media and their website their new album Good Luck, Kid would be released September 13, 2019. The first single, Fighter, was described on Twitter by Meegan as "a song looking you in the eye and asking you to come alive and fight. It’s asking you to wake up and make a choice to have presence for what and who is in front of you." The title track, Good Luck Kid, was released as a single on August 13, 2019.

=== The Sun ===
On January 25, 2023, the band announced their new album The Sun would be released April 28, 2023. The first single, titled Nervous System, was released alongside the announcement. This was followed by the title track, The Sun, as a single on March 17, 2023, and then a third single, Fireworks, on April 25, 2023.

=== Starting Over At The End and Allison's departure ===
On August 2, 2024, the band announced that Allison would be stepping away from the band "for the foreseeable future" after completing their then-current tour, and that a new album had already been in the works by the two remaining sisters. Five days later the band released Starting Over At The End, their first song as a duo.

=== Closer to Happy ===
Closer to Happy was released on January 30, 2026, through Nettwerk Music Group. It marked the band's first full-length release as a duo, following the 2024 departure of co-founder Allison Closner. The album was co-produced by Natalie and Meegan Closner alongside Luke Niccoli, and consists of twelve tracks exploring themes of heartbreak, loss, and self-reclamation. To support the album, the band embarked on the Closer to Happy Tour across the United States and Canada.

== Discography ==
=== Studio albums ===
Title	Album details	Peak positions				
Title	Album details	US	US Alt.	US Folk	US Indie	US Rock
Native Dreamer Kin	Released: March 12, 2014; Label: Self-released; Formats: CD, digital download	—	—	—	—	—
I'm Alone, No You're Not	Released: August 26, 2016; Label: ATO Records; Formats: CD, digital download	104	8	3	9	9
Good Luck, Kid	Released: September 13, 2019; Label: ATO Records; Formats: CD, digital download	— (Note: Good Luck, Kid did not enter the US Billboard 200, but peaked at number four on the Top Heatseekers Albums Chart.)	—	17	15	—
The Sun	Released: April 28, 2023; Label: ATO Records; Formats: CD, digital download	—	—	—	—	—
Closer to Happy	Released: January 30, 2026; Label: Nettwerk	—	—	—	—	—

=== EPs ===
Title	Album details
ATO Records Session	Released: December 1, 2015; Label: ATO Records; Formats: digital download
Stay Awake	Released: September 8, 2017; Label: ATO Records; Formats: CD, digital download
Trio Sessions Vol.1	Released: January 31, 2020; Label: ATO Records; Formats: digital download

=== Singles ===
==== As lead artist ====
Title	Year	Peak chart positions			Album
Title	Year	US AAA	US Rock Air.	MEX	Album
"White Flag"	2016	1	43	34	I'm Alone, No You're Not
"SOS (Overboard)"	2016	13	—	—	I'm Alone, No You're Not
"Planets"	2016	—	—	—	I'm Alone, No You're Not
"California Dreamin'"	2017	—	—	—	Non-album singles
"Sister Winter"	2018	—	—	—	Non-album singles
"Fighter"	2019	10	—	—	Good Luck, Kid
"NYE"	2019	29	—	—	Good Luck, Kid
"Sauce"	2020	—	—	—	Non-album singles
"NYE (Violents Remix)"	2020	—	—	—	Non-album singles
"Nervous System"	2023	34	—	—	The Sun
"The Sun"	2023	—	—	—	The Sun
"Fireworks"	2023	—	—	—	The Sun
"The Christmas Song"	2023	—	—	—	Non-album singles
"Starting Over at the End"	2024	—	—	—	Non-album singles
"Birds of a Feather"	2024	—	—	—	Non-album singles
"Bye and Bye"	2025	—	—	—	Closer to Happy
"I Believe in Myself" (feat. Becca Mancari)	2025	—	—	—	Closer to Happy
"Looking Back"	2025	—	—	—	Closer to Happy
"Ready to Let You Down"	2025	—	—	—	Closer to Happy
"Closer to Me"	2025	—	—	—	Closer to Happy
"Blindspot"	2025	—	—	—	Closer to Happy
"Morning Forest"	2026	—	—	—	Closer to Happy

==== As featured artist ====
Title	Year	Album
"Still Life" (Henry Jamison featuring Joseph)	2020	Tourism
"Cracks in the Ceiling" (Devon Gilfillian featuring Joseph)	2020	Black Hole Rainbow
