= Alexander Cardinale =

American singer

- Also known as: Xander
- Origin: Monterey, California, U.S.
- Genres: Pop
- Occupation: Singer-songwriter
- Instruments: Vocals; guitar
- Years active: 2010–present
- Label: Atlantic
- Website: alexandercardinale.com

Alexander Cardinale is an American singer signed to Atlantic Records. His song "Made for You" was used in an international Coca-Cola advertisement.

== Career ==
Alexander toured with Pentatonix in Fall of 2012. Cardinale's song "Sick of Dreaming" was the featured music montage in episodes of One Tree Hill on The CW and American Broadcasting Company's Rookie Blue. Other TV placements include episodes of Ghost Whisperer (CBS), Castle (American Broadcasting Company), "The Mysteries of Laura", Friends with Benefits (NBC) and 90210 (The CW).

In October 2014, Alexander toured with Melissa Etheridge.

=== "Made for You" ===
In January 2016, Alexander released the single "Made For You" on Warner Bros. Records. The song was featured in Coca-Cola's worldwide advertisement titled "Break Up", and gained heavy rotation on SiriusXM's Adult Top 40 station The Pulse. The song was a collaboration with longtime friend and producer Morgan Taylor Reid (Plugin Stereo, Grace Mitchell, Max's "Gibberish", and Jo Jo).

== Awards ==
Music Connection magazine named Alexander Cardinale one of their "HOT 100" unsigned artists in 2011 and 2012. He was nominated for Best AAA/Adult Contemporary Artist of 2011 by the HMMA (Hollywood Music in Media Awards), and his song "Traffic Lights" was named Best Song – TV Show at the HMMA in 2012. In 2011, Cardinale won the top prize in the Pop category and the overall second prize at the USA Songwriting Competition, and he showcased at South by Southwest 2011. He had five showcases at SXSW 2012 in Austin, Texas. He also showcased at The Indie Music Fest, the NAMM Show, and DRIVEN Music & Art Conference in 2011.

== Discography ==
=== EPs ===
Title	Year
Sick of Dreaming	2009
Traffic Lights	2011

=== Singles ===
Title	Year	Peak chart positions
Title	Year	BEL (FL) Tip
"One Shot"	2013	—
"Made for You"	2016	—
"Simple Things" (featuring Christina Perri)	2019	6
