= Jack & Jack =

American pop-rap duo

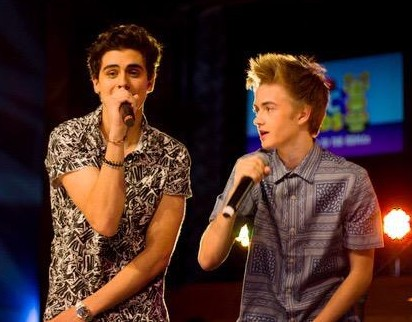
- Jack Gilinsky (left) and Jack Johnson (right) performing in March 2015

Background information
- Born: Jack Edward Johnson; March 24, 1996 (age 30); Omaha, Nebraska, United States; Jack Finnegan Gilinsky; September 10, 1996 (age 30); Omaha, Nebraska, United States
- Origin: Omaha, Nebraska, United States
- Genres: Pop-rap; R&B
- Occupation: Musician
- Years active: 2013–2020, 2022–present
- Label: Island
- Members: Jack Johnson; Jack Gilinsky
- Website: www.jackandjackofficial.com

Jack & Jack are an American pop-rap duo from Omaha, Nebraska, consisting of Jack Johnson and Jack Gilinsky, based in Los Angeles, California. After success via the social media app Vine, the duo turned to careers as musicians. Their 2014 single "Wild Life" peaked at number 87 on the US Billboard Hot 100. They also featured on Jonas Blue's 2018 hit single "Rise", which peaked at number three in the UK Singles Chart in addition to charting within the top 20 of various other European countries and Australia.

== Early lives and career ==
Jack Edward Johnson and Jack Gilinsky were born in Omaha, Nebraska. The pair met on the first day of kindergarten, both named Jack and wearing the same shirt. They remained friends throughout their elementary and high school years, graduating from Westside High School in 2014.

Jack & Jack's comedy career began in 2007 with the creation of their first collaboration YouTube channel MotherFalconQuagmire. The short satires included lip syncing music videos, short parodies of popular songs, and British-speaking lads. Although only made as a side hobby during free time, their videos were received by a considerable audience of hundreds; this abruptly faded not long after the pair started high school.

Jack Gilinsky is Jewish, and his parents are prominent in Omaha's Jewish community.

== Career ==
=== 2013–15: Breakout with Vine ===
Jack & Jack began posting six second clips as a comedy duo on Vine during the summer of 2013. Johnson had posted the first vines under his name in July 2013 including the I Never Miss series, Gilinsky later making appearances on their now growing joint account, rebranded as Jack and Jack. Their breakout came with their Nerd Vandals clip going viral, praised by the Huffington Post as the perfect vine, amassing the pair 25,000 followers in a short period of time. Their vines consisted of 6 second covers of pre-existing songs, also including When This Song Comes On clips made exclusively in the car, short comedy clips featuring the couple as overconcerned parents, nerd alter-egos Eric and Winston, girls in wigs, and more. Shortly thereafter, they joined the Magcon tour, and continued to amass a following on the road touring with other Vine artists. By early 2015, they had accumulated over 5 million followers on their shared account and ranked in the top 20 most-followed Viners.

Following success on Vine, Jack & Jack released two mobile app games with Omaha-based mobile games company SkyVu Entertainment. Their first game, Let It Goat, garnered over a million downloads within the first month." They developed their second game, Jack & Jack Vines Puzzle Game, in December 2014.

=== 2014–2020: Focus on music ===
Jack & Jack's musical pursuits began when the duo met sophomores Turner and Travis Eakins (also known as Barrington Park) in 2013. Through this partnership, Jack & Jack recorded their earliest co-written songs (including "Indoor Recess", their first unofficially released single) in a makeshift studio, with a backing instrumental made by the Eakins brothers. This enabled their music to be mixed and released on the iTunes Store via third party distributor TuneCore.

Their first original song "Distance" was released in January 2014. In preparation for their debut album, the duo collaborated with Shawn Mendes and Steve Aoki, as well as producers and songwriters Max Martin and Savan Kotecha. Although repeatedly approached, the pair decided to not sign with a record label company, with Johnson stating, "Why get our money stolen, or make less money, when we can get our songs on the exact same spot on the charts ourselves? We’re going to stay independent as long as we can, until we see the benefit from the record label."

By February 2015, they had sold 1 million singles on iTunes. They have also made the Billboard Top Digital Songs List with "Doing It Right", "Tides", "Cold Hearted", "Like That" featuring Skate, "Right Where You Are" and "Wild Life". Their single "Like That" topped the Billboard charts shortly after the release of their official music video, in which Jack & Jack paid homage to The Beatles's iconic album Abbey Road.

On July 24, 2015, Jack & Jack independently released a debut extended play (EP) Calibraska to the digital market via distributor DistroKid, founded by Philip J. Kaplan. The EP reached number one on the US iTunes album charts within hours of its release. In early 2017, Jack & Jack signed with Island Records. Johnson stated they hoped the record deal would allow them to become more mainstream. They released their second EP, titled Gone, later that year through the label. In January 2018, Jack & Jack were picked as Elvis Duran's Artist of the Month.

On January 25, 2019, the duo released their debut album called A Good Friend Is Nice, via Island Records, and also toured around North America and Europe to promote the album.

=== 2020–present: Hiatus, solo careers and 2022 return ===
On April 17, 2020, member Jack Gilinsky released his debut solo single My Love, featuring Don Toliver. The day the single came out, he did an interview with Zach Sang, and announced a hiatus to Jack & Jack. Jack Johnson described the hiatus as a "very liberating" opportunity for both members to explore their own artistic vision.

Jack Johnson released his debut solo single, "You Lie", on September 4, 2020, with the stage name JVCKJ to prevent legal clashes with a band called JACK J. He then released his debut solo EP, Pastel: The Early Days, on December 4, 2020. The track "Bad News" was inspired by the COVID-19 pandemic. He also expressed a desire to work with Jack Gilinsky again on more music.

On September 10, 2020, member Jack Gilinsky dropped his second solo single, "Lose Somebody" featuring Iann Dior.

In 2022, Jack & Jack returned with two releases, "Runaway" and "Right Here With You".

== Style and influences ==
Both Jacks play instruments and write music, sharing interests across genres including reggae, R&B, pop and hip hop which have influences on their own songs. They have cited Anderson Paak, Roy Woods, PartyNextDoor, and Daniel Caesar as influences. They have been influenced from music they grew up with such as Blink 182, U2, Tom Petty and AC/DC, even though their musical genre is not the same.

== Tours and performances ==
=== Digitour (2014) ===
In June 2014, after graduating from Omaha Westside High School, the duo recognised the ability to monetize their situation and headed to Los Angeles to work on their headlining tour, DigiTour Jack and Jack coordinated by DigiTour Media. The 18 city tour sold out in all but four cities across the United States, and consisted of choreographed on stage music performances, fan interaction and comedy skits. During this tour, Jack & Jack also made a headlining performance at the Teen Choice Awards, where they were nominated for the award Choice Viner. Alongside this, they also appeared as featured performers at the 2014 INTOUR, an interactive social festival as part of their partnership with FullScreen.

Upon its conclusion in mid-September 2014, a full-length movie documenting Jack & Jack's headlining tour was released for online sale by DigiTour Media in December 2014, providing fans with a behind-the-scenes glimpse of their roadshow.

Prior to their headline tour, Jack & Jack toured alongside artists and social media sensations including Nash Grier, Cameron Dallas, Shawn Mendes and more in 2013.

=== First headlines ===
On December 20, 2014, Jack & Jack headlined their own one-night only music oriented performance at the Ralston Arena in their hometown of Omaha, Nebraska, with fellow performers Emblem3 and special guest Hot Boy.

=== Guest performances ===
As part of their partnership with Communications Service Verizon, Jack & Jack have performed at the Verizon Michigan Avenue Destination Store Grand Opening (November 2014) and at the Bayou Music Center to a crowd of 1,500 as part of the Verizon Houston Destination Store Grand Opening (January 2015).

On February 27, 2015, Jack and Jack made their debut television appearance on ABC's The View as part of a Vine On The View segment upon the request of Ryan Seacrest to discuss fame, bullying and their comedy career. They also performed their single Tides to a live audience.

On March 21, 2015, Jack & Jack made their international performance debut at the Wembley Arena, London, England as featured opening act for The Janoskians at the soldout one-off live event JanoFest.

As part of their brand partnership, Jack & Jack gave an exclusive performance at Fullscreen's NewFronts presentation in New York City on May 4, 2015. On May 9, 2015, Jack & Jack performed at the VITY Concert Experience in Hollywood California, with other special guests Tyga and Kid Ink. During this event they also officially confirmed their Summer tour of 2015.

=== Summer Tour 2015 ===
Jack & Jack's Summer tour of 2015 consists of multiple independent performances in different locations, which began in May in Chicago with two concerts on consecutive days.

They continued their touring contract with DigiTour from June, headlining eight events across the United States, alongside other acts including Demi Lovato and Trevi Moran.

== Philanthropy ==
Jack & Jack have partnered with multiple brands to promote skin-cancer awareness and anti-bullying content. They participated in Ryan Seacrest's 2015 Super Bowl #MakeItHappy campaign, which encourages kindness on the internet and in social media. They have also worked in association with Michelin to promote safe driving.

Jack & Jack have previously made appearances at multiple charity events including Miles for Music and at the Camp Ronald McDonald for Good Times fundraiser. They have also shown support to The Fred & Pamela Buffett Cancer Center, in Omaha, Nebraska. They gave a supporting performance at T.J. Martell Foundation's annual New York Family Day event in December 2015.

== Filmography ==
Film
Year	Title	Role	Notes
2014	Jack and Jack: The Movie	Themselves	A DigiTour Media Production

== Awards and nominations ==
Year	Award	Category	Result	Ref.
2014	Teen Choice Awards	Viner	Nominated	
2015	MTV Woodie Awards	Social Climber	Won	
2015	Teen Choice Awards	Web Star: Music	Nominated	
2015	Streamy Awards	Entertainer of the Year	Nominated	
2019	Brit Awards	British Video of the Year	Nominated	

== Discography ==
=== Studio albums ===
- A Good Friend Is Nice (2019)
- Home (2024)

=== EPs ===
- Calibraska (2015)
- Gone (2017)
