= Reloaded: 20 Number 1 Hits =

Reloaded: 20 #1 Hits

Greatest hits album by Blake Shelton
- Released: October 23, 2015
- Genre: Country
- Length: 76:21
- Label: Warner Bros. Nashville
- Producer: Bobby Braddock; Scott Hendricks; Brent Rowan

Blake Shelton chronology
Bringing Back the Sunshine (2014)	Reloaded: 20 #1 Hits (2015)	If I'm Honest (2016)

Reloaded: 20 #1 Hits is the second greatest hits album by American country singer Blake Shelton. It was released on October 23, 2015, by Warner Bros. Nashville. The album features the number one hits from Shelton's fifteen-year career.

== Commercial performance ==
Reloaded: 20 Number 1 Hits debuted at number five on the Billboard 200, selling 32,800 copies on its first week. The following week, it sold an additional 18,000 copies. It also debuted at number two on the Top Country Albums. The album has sold 373,100 copies in the US as of March 2017, and 3,883,000 units consumed in total including tracks and streams as of March 2020.

== Track listing ==
No.	Title	Writer(s)	Album	Length
1.	"Sangria"	J. T. Harding; Josh Osborne; Trevor Rosen	Bringing Back the Sunshine	3:54
2.	"Lonely Tonight" (featuring Ashley Monroe)	Brent Anderson; Ryan Hurd	Bringing Back the Sunshine	3:38
3.	"Neon Light"	Andrew Dorff; Mark Irwin; Josh Kear	Bringing Back the Sunshine	3:41
4.	"My Eyes" (featuring Gwen Sebastian)	Dorff; Osborne; Tommy Lee James	Based on a True Story...	3:10
5.	"Doin' What She Likes"	Wade Kirby; Phil O'Donnell	Based on a True Story...	3:42
6.	"Mine Would Be You"	Jessi Alexander; Connie Harrington; Deric Ruttan	Based on a True Story...	3:59
7.	"Boys 'Round Here" (featuring Pistol Annies and Friends)	Rhett Akins; Dallas Davidson; Craig Wiseman	Based on a True Story...	4:48
8.	"Sure Be Cool If You Did"	Rodney Clawson; Chris Tompkins; Jimmy Robbins	Based on a True Story...	3:35
9.	"Over"	Paul Jenkins; David Elliot Johnson	Red River Blue	3:13
10.	"Drink on It"	Alexander; Clawson; Jon Randall	Red River Blue	3:31
11.	"God Gave Me You"	Dave Barnes	Red River Blue	3:48
12.	"Honey Bee"	Akins; Ben Hayslip	Red River Blue	3:30
13.	"Who Are You When I'm Not Looking"	Earl Bud Lee; John Wiggins	All About Tonight	3:09
14.	"All About Tonight"	Akins; Davidson; Hayslip	All About Tonight	3:27
15.	"Hillbilly Bone" (featuring Trace Adkins)	Wiseman; Luke Laird	Hillbilly Bone	3:44
16.	"She Wouldn't Be Gone"	Jennifer Adan; Cory Batten	Startin' Fires	3:35
17.	"Home"	Michael Bublé; Alan Chang; Amy Foster-Gillies	Pure BS	3:50
18.	"Some Beach"	Rory Feek; Paul Overstreet	Blake Shelton's Barn & Grill	3:24
19.	"The Baby"	Harley Allen; Michael White	The Dreamer	3:54
20.	"Austin"	David Kent; Kirsti Manna	Blake Shelton	3:52
21.	"Gonna" (Bonus Track)	Wiseman; Laird	Bringing Back the Sunshine	3:03

== Charts ==
=== Weekly charts ===
Chart (2015)	Peak position
Canadian Albums (Billboard)	12
US Billboard 200	5
US Top Country Albums (Billboard)	2

=== Year-end charts ===
Chart (2015)	Position
US Top Country Albums (Billboard)	47
Chart (2016)	Position
US Billboard 200	47
US Top Country Albums (Billboard)	10
Chart (2017)	Position
US Billboard 200	151
US Top Country Albums (Billboard)	24
Chart (2018)	Position
US Billboard 200	187
US Top Country Albums (Billboard)	22
Chart (2019)	Position
US Top Country Albums (Billboard)	16
Chart (2020)	Position
US Top Country Albums (Billboard)	20

== Certifications ==
Region	Certification	Certified units/sales
United States (RIAA)	Gold	500,000^{‡}
^{‡} Sales+streaming figures based on certification alone.

== Release history ==
List of release dates, showing region, formats, label, editions and reference
Region	Date	Format(s)	Label	Edition(s)	Ref.
United States	October 23, 2015	CD, digital download	Warner Bros. Nashville	Standard	
