= Loaded: The Best of Blake Shelton =

Greatest hits album by Blake Shelton
- Released: November 9, 2010
- Genre: Country
- Length: 54:57
- Label: Reprise

Blake Shelton chronology
All About Tonight (2010)	Loaded: The Best of Blake Shelton (2010)	Red River Blue (2011)

Professional ratings
Review scores
Source	Rating
AllMusic	4/5 stars

Loaded: The Best of Blake Shelton is the first greatest hits album by the American country music artist Blake Shelton. It was released on November 9, 2010, by Warner Music Group Nashville, under its Reprise label. By March 2015, the album had sold one million copies in the United States and was Shelton's fourth career album to have been certified Platinum by the RIAA.

== Track listing ==
No.	Title	Writer(s)	Original album	Length
1.	"Austin"	Kirsti Manna; David Kent	Blake Shelton	3:50
2.	"Ol' Red"	James "Bo" Bohan; Don Goodman; Mark Sherrill	Blake Shelton	3:42
3.	"The Baby"	Harley Allen; Michael White	The Dreamer	3:55
4.	"Playboys of the Southwestern World"	Randy VanWarmer; Neal Coty	The Dreamer	4:29
5.	"Some Beach"	Rory Feek; Paul Overstreet	Blake Shelton's Barn & Grill	3:24
6.	"Goodbye Time"	James Dean Hicks; Roger Murrah	Blake Shelton's Barn & Grill	3:23
7.	"Nobody but Me"	Shawn Camp; Philip White	Blake Shelton's Barn & Grill	2:38
8.	"Don't Make Me"	Marla Cannon-Goodman; Deanna Bryant; Dave Berg	Pure BS	4:06
9.	"The More I Drink"	David Lee Murphy; Chris DuBois; Dave Turnbull	Pure BS	3:37
10.	"Home"	Michael Bublé; Alan Chang; Amy Foster-Gillies	Pure BS	3:49
11.	"She Wouldn't Be Gone"	Jennifer Adan; Cory Batten	Startin' Fires	3:35
12.	"Hillbilly Bone" (featuring Trace Adkins)	Luke Laird; Craig Wiseman	Hillbilly Bone	3:44
13.	"Kiss My Country Ass"	Rhett Akins; Dallas Davidson; Jon Stone	Hillbilly Bone	4:12
14.	"All About Tonight"	Akins; Ben Hayslip; Davidson	All About Tonight	3:25
15.	"Who Are You When I'm Not Looking"	Earl Bud Lee; John Wiggins	All About Tonight	3:08

== Charts ==
=== Weekly charts ===
Weekly chart performance for Loaded: The Best of Blake Shelton
Chart (2010–2011)	Peak position
Australian Country Albums (ARIA)	13
US Billboard 200	18
US Top Country Albums (Billboard)	4

=== Year-end charts ===
Year-end chart performance for Loaded: The Best of Blake Shelton
Chart (2011)	Position
US Billboard 200	73
US Top Country Albums (Billboard)	16
Chart (2012)	Position
US Top Country Albums (Billboard)	44
Chart (2013)	Position
US Billboard 200	156
Chart (2014)	Position
US Billboard 200	146

== Certifications ==
Certifications for Loaded: The Best of Blake Shelton
Region	Certification	Certified units/sales
United States (RIAA)	Platinum	1,000,000^{^}
^{^} Shipments figures based on certification alone.
