= Greatest Hits (Joe Nichols album) =

Greatest hits album by Joe Nichols
- Released: January 25, 2011
- Recorded: 2002–10
- Genre: Country
- Length: 33:07
- Label: Show Dog-Universal Music
- Producer: Various original producers

Joe Nichols chronology
Old Things New (2009)	Greatest Hits (2011)	It's All Good (2011)

Professional ratings
Review scores
Source	Rating
Allmusic	4/5 stars

Greatest Hits is the first compilation album by American country music artist Joe Nichols. It was released on January 25, 2011 by Show Dog-Universal Music.

== Track listing ==
No.	Title	Writer(s)	Length
1.	"Gimmie That Girl"	Rhett Akins; Dallas Davidson; Ben Hayslip	3:05
2.	"The Shape I'm In"	Akins; Davidson; Hayslip	3:08
3.	"Tequila Makes Her Clothes Fall Off"	Gary Hannan; John Wiggins	3:07
4.	"Brokenheartsville"	Randy Boudreaux; Clint Daniels; Donny Kees; Blake Mevis	3:51
5.	"Size Matters (Someday)"	Mike Dekle; Byron Hill	2:50
6.	"The Impossible"	Kelley Lovelace; Lee Thomas Miller	4:06
7.	"What's a Guy Gotta Do"	Joe Nichols; Lovelace; Don Sampson	2:21
8.	"It Ain't No Crime"	Tony Martin; Mark Nesler; Tom Shapiro	3:37
9.	"Cool to Be a Fool"	Nichols; Steve Dean; Wil Nance	2:56
10.	"I'll Wait for You"	Harley Allen; Bill Anderson	4:06

== Chart performance ==
=== Weekly charts ===
Chart (2011)	Peak position
US Billboard 200	52
US Top Country Albums (Billboard)	12

=== Year-end charts ===
Chart (2011)	Position
US Top Country Albums (Billboard)	72
