= All About Tonight =

All About Tonight may refer to:

- All About Tonight (EP), a 2010 extended play by Blake Shelton
  - "All About Tonight" (Blake Shelton song), its title track
- "All About Tonight" (Pixie Lott song), 2011
