= Red River Blue =

Studio album by Blake Shelton
- Released: July 12, 2011
- Genre: Country
- Length: 38:08
- Label: Warner Bros. Nashville
- Producers: Scott Hendricks (all tracks); Chris Stevens (track 10); Craig Wiseman (track 10)

Blake Shelton chronology
Loaded: The Best of Blake Shelton (2010)	Red River Blue (2011)	Cheers, It's Christmas (2012)

Singles from Red River Blue
- 1. "Honey Bee" Released: April 4, 2011; 2. "God Gave Me You" Released: July 25, 2011; 3. "Drink on It" Released: January 9, 2012; 4. "Over" Released: May 21, 2012

Red River Blue is the sixth studio album by American country music artist Blake Shelton. It was released on July 12, 2011, via Warner Bros. Records, and is Shelton's inaugural No. 1 album on the Billboard 200 chart, debuting at the top spot on July 30, 2011. Four singles were released from the album: "Honey Bee", "God Gave Me You", "Drink on It", and "Over". All four singles peaked at No. 1 on the Billboard charts for Hot Country Songs and Country Airplay. "God Gave Me You" is a cover, written and originally recorded by Christian rock singer Dave Barnes. Red River Blue's title track is a duet with Shelton's then-wife and fellow country singer Miranda Lambert.

Red River Blue earned Shelton his first Grammy Award nomination for Best Country Album, and "Honey Bee" earned him his first Grammy Award nomination for Best Country Solo Performance. "Over" earned him a second nomination in the latter category. Shelton's cover of "God Gave Me You" earned a Grammy Award nomination for Best Country Song.

== Background ==
Shelton's marriage to Miranda Lambert and his debut as a judge on The Voice both occurred earlier in the same year as Red River Blue's release; one year before the album's release, Shelton joined the Grand Ole Opry and won the Country Music Association Award for Male Vocalist of the Year. The proximity of all these milestones to the album's release led Matt Bjorke of the website Roughstock to write that Red River Blue marked "the biggest album release of [Shelton's] career" since Shelton's self-titled debut album.

Although the release date for Red River Blue was originally scheduled for September 2011, this was moved up to July of that year, so as to capitalize on the success of the album's lead single, "Honey Bee". In April 2011, Shelton said, "Playing your cards too close to your chest doesn't pay out. I feel like right now if I've got a single that's exploding, easily my fastest climber, I don't want to do something like wait and put (the album) out in the fall. It's when you rally the troops and say, 'Man, we've got to get this thing done.'" According to Thom Jurek of AllMusic, Shelton "only had half an album finished" at the time and was "given two weeks to complete the rest".

== Content ==
The album's second single is a cover of "God Gave Me You", which was written and originally recorded by Contemporary Christian music artist Dave Barnes. Shelton explained that he first heard the song during "a low point" in his relationship with Miranda Lambert and said, "for whatever reason I was flipping through stations and landed on a contemporary Christian station, and that song came on and I almost had to pull the truck over. It was one of those moments for me where I felt like I was hearing that song at that moment for a reason."

Shelton duets with Lambert on the album's title track. The song was originally recorded by Ray Stephenson, who co-wrote it with Buddy Owens. Shelton has said that his decision to cover the song was inspired by a time three years before the album's release when he and Lambert briefly broke up.

Shelton duets with Martina McBride on "I'm Sorry", which had first been pitched to Shelton for one of his earlier albums, but Shelton was initially unsure if he was the right vocalist to record it. Calling it "a hard song to sing", he explained, "Once we got in there and cut it, I realized I can be comfortable with this."

Shelton wanted Red River Blue's third single to be "one of the rowdier songs on the album" and considered "Get Some" before "Drink On It" was chosen. "Drink On It" was the last song Shelton recorded for the album.

The album's fourth single, "Over", was written by Paul Jenkins and David Elliott Johnson, who originally planned on recording the song themselves for a rock band they were going to start together. They wrote the song at least a decade before Shelton recorded it.

== Reception ==
=== Commercial ===
The album debuted on the Billboard 200 at number one with 116,000 sold in the US in its debut week. It is Blake Shelton's highest charting album and his first album to reach number one on this chart. As of March 2015, the album has sold 1,240,000 copies in the US. In 2016, it was certified double-platinum with sales of 2,000,000 units.

=== Critical ===
Professional ratings
Aggregate scores
Source	Rating
Metacritic	(62/100)
Review scores
Source	Rating
About.com	4/5 stars
AllMusic	3/5 stars
American Songwriter	3.5/5 stars
The A.V. Club	C
Entertainment Weekly	B
Nashville Country Club	4/5 stars
PopMatters	5/10 stars
Rolling Stone	2.5/5 stars
Roughstock	4/5 stars
Slant Magazine	2.5/5 stars
Taste of Country	5/5 stars
Urban Country News	4/5 stars
USA Today	3/4 stars

Red River Blue received a mixed to positive response from music critics. At Metacritic, which assigns a normalized rating out of 100 to reviews from mainstream critics, the album received an average score of 62, based on 9 reviews.

The positive reviews came in from About.com, American Songwriter Entertainment Weekly, Nashville Country Club, Roughstock, Taste of Country, Urban Country News and the USA Today. Critic Scott Sexton of About.com rated the album a four out of five stars, and called this effort "Blake Shelton being at the top of his game". Critic Allen Morrison of American Songwriter rated the album a three and a half out of five stars, and evoked how "Red River Blue should do nothing to slow his momentum." Critic Melissa Maerz of Entertainment Weekly graded the album a B, and exclaimed "Aww!" Emily Wetta music critic for Nashville Country Club wrote that "While most of the songs have a word or phrase that is continually repeated, it still won't stop you from listening to the album on repeat. With heart warming love songs and the occasional feel good song, Red River Blue has great balance. Full of honest and raw emotion, Blake wins the hearts of all women and with songs like 'Get Some' wins the male audience." Roughstock critic Matt Bjorke rated the album a four out of five stars, and called the album "...a collection of songs that may be the most satisfying album of Blake Shelton's career." Music-critic Billy Dukes of Taste of Country rated the album as being perfect, and said "‘Red River Blue’ is Shelton hitting a homerun [sic] in a clutch situation as the eyes of the country music world are bearing down on him." Liv Carter music critic for Urban Country News wrote "Red River Blue shows Shelton has reached the point in his career where he does exactly what he wants. Well put-together, greatly executed and (mostly) well-written...Red River Blue is a confident, contemporary country album which will cement Blake Shelton's country superstar status." Music critic Brian Mansfield from USA Today wrote that "Longtime fans can hear Red River Blue's roguishly charming performances and feel confident that the Country Music Association's male vocalist of the year will find his biggest success."

However, the album had some mixed reviews come in from AllMusic, The A.V. Club, PopMatters, Rolling Stone and Slant Magazine. Critic Thom Jurek of AllMusic rated the album a three out of five stars, and called the album "uncharacteristically tender." The A.V. Club critic Steven Hyden gave the album a C grade, and commented that "He's in the creamy, mushy middle, which is exactly where he aims on Red River Blue." Critic Dave Heaton of PopMatters gave the album a five out of ten stars, and noted that "Red River Blue's songs generally feel both cynical and overly familiar". Rolling Stone music critic Will Hermes rated the album a two and a half out of five stars, and wrote that "Red River Blue is unlikely to offend anyone...[and it] shows similarly versatile market savvy." Likewise, critic Jonathan Keefe of Slant Magazine gave it the same rating, and criticized the album because it "...proves that he's a capable singer who chooses to sing some lackluster songs."

== Track listing ==
No.	Title	Writer(s)	Length
1.	"Honey Bee"	Rhett Akins, Ben Hayslip	3:30
2.	"Ready to Roll"	Jim Beavers, Jonathan Singleton, Chris Stapleton	3:36
3.	"God Gave Me You"	Dave Barnes	3:50
4.	"Get Some"	Zac Maloy, Chris Tompkins, Craig Wiseman	3:32
5.	"Drink on It"	Jessi Alexander, Rodney Clawson, Jon Randall	3:31
6.	"Good Ol' Boys"	Dallas Davidson	3:08
7.	"I'm Sorry" (featuring Martina McBride)	Chris DuBois, Ashley Gorley, Stapleton	3:29
8.	"Sunny in Seattle"	Beavers, DuBois, Stapleton	3:27
9.	"Over"	Paul Jenkins, David Elliott Johnson	3:13
10.	"Hey"	Clint Lagerberg, Tompkins, Wiseman	3:31
11.	"Red River Blue" (duet with Miranda Lambert)	Ray Stephenson, Buddy Owens	3:21
Total length:			38:08

iTunes Deluxe edition bonus tracks
No.	Title	Writer(s)	Length
12.	"Chill"	Don Poythress, Donnie Skaggs, Billy Joe Walker, Jr.	3:27
13.	"Addicted"	Cheryl Wheeler	4:00
14.	"All About Tonight" (live) (pre-order only)
15.	"Kiss My Country Ass" (live) (pre-order only)
16.	"Who Are You When I'm Not Looking" (live) (pre-order only)
17.	"She Wouldn't Be Gone" (live) (pre-order only)
18.	"Hillbilly Bone" (live) (pre-order only)

Target Re-release Deluxe Edition Bonus Track
No.	Title	Length
12.	"Footloose"	3:39

== Personnel ==
- Tim Akers – Hammond B-3 organ, piano
- Jessi Alexander – background vocals
- Mike Brignardello – bass guitar
- Tom Bukovac – electric guitar
- Perry Coleman – background vocals
- Eric Darken – percussion
- Connie Ellisor – violin
- Paul Franklin – pedal steel guitar
- Aubrey Haynie – fiddle, mandolin
- Wes Hightower – background vocals
- Paul Jenkins – electric guitar
- Mike Johnson – pedal steel guitar
- Elizabeth Lamb – background vocals
- Miranda Lambert – background vocals on "Red River Blue"
- Troy Lancaster – electric guitar
- Martina McBride – background vocals on "I'm Sorry"
- Chris McHugh – drums, percussion
- Brent Mason – electric guitar
- Greg Morrow – drums, percussion
- Gordon Mote – Hammond B-3 organ, piano, programming
- Russ Pahl – pedal steel guitar
- Carole Rabinowitz – cello
- Eberhard Ramm – viola
- Blake Shelton – lead vocals
- Adam Shoenfeld – electric guitar
- Pamela Sixfin – violin
- Jimmie Lee Sloas – bass guitar
- Bryan Sutton – acoustic guitar
- Ilya Toshinsky – acoustic guitar

== Charts ==
=== Weekly charts ===
Chart (2011)	Peak position
Canadian Albums (Billboard)	13
US Billboard 200	1
US Top Country Albums (Billboard)	1

=== Year-end charts ===
Chart (2011)	Position
US Billboard 200	72
US Top Country Albums (Billboard)	17

Chart (2012)	Position
US Billboard 200	67
US Top Country Albums (Billboard)	16

Chart (2013)	Position
US Billboard 200	129
US Top Country Albums (Billboard)	44

Chart (2014)	Position
US Billboard 200	193

=== Singles ===
Year	Single	Peak chart positions				
Year	Single	US Country	Country Airplay	US	US AC	CAN
2011	"Honey Bee"	1	1	13	—	28
2011	"God Gave Me You"	1	1	22	29	38
2012	"Drink on It"	1	1	39	—	53
2012	"Over"	1	1	43	—	59
"—" denotes releases that did not chart

== Accolades ==
Red River Blue was nominated for Best Country Album at the 54th Annual Grammy Awards. At that same ceremony, "Honey Bee" and "God Gave Me You" were nominated respectively in the Best Country Solo Performance and Best Country Song categories. The following year, "Over" earned Shelton another Grammy nomination in the Best Country Solo Performance category.

== Certifications ==
Region	Certification	Certified units/sales
United States (RIAA)	2× Platinum	2,000,000^{‡}
^{‡} Sales+streaming figures based on certification alone.
