= I Lived It =

Single by Blake Shelton

from the album Texoma Shore
- Released: January 29, 2018
- Genre: Country
- Length: 3:39
- Label: Warner Bros. Nashville
- Songwriters: Rhett Akins; Ashley Gorley; Ben Hayslip; Ross Copperman
- Producer: Scott Hendricks

Blake Shelton singles chronology
"You Make It Feel Like Christmas" (2017)	"I Lived It" (2018)	"Turnin' Me On" (2018)

"I Lived It" is a song written by Rhett Akins, Ashley Gorley, Ben Hayslip, and Ross Copperman and recorded by American country music singer Blake Shelton. It was released in January 2018 as the second single from Shelton's 2017 album Texoma Shore.

== Content ==
"I Lived It" features a nostalgic look at the narrator's childhood. Shelton told The Boot that the song "really stands out to everybody as maybe the best song on the album".

== Commercial performance ==
The song peaked at No. 3 on the Country Airplay chart for chart dated June 30, 2018. The song has sold 153,000 copies in the United States as of June 2018. It was certified Gold by the RIAA on July 31, 2019 for 500,000 units in sales and streams.

== Music video ==
The accompanying music video for this song features photographs from Shelton's childhood and teenage years, interspersed with flashbacks and footage of Blake performing. It was filmed north of Los Angeles, CA, and directed by Adam Rothlein.

== Charts ==
=== Weekly charts ===
Weekly chart performance for "I Lived It"
Chart (2018)	Peak position
Canada Digital Song Sales (Billboard)	35
US Billboard Hot 100	63
US Country Airplay (Billboard)	3
US Hot Country Songs (Billboard)	8

=== Year-end charts ===
Year=end chart performance for "I Lived It"
Chart (2018)	Position
US Country Airplay (Billboard)	18
US Hot Country Songs (Billboard)	27
US Radio Songs (Billboard)	71

== Certifications ==
Region	Certification	Certified units/sales
Canada (Music Canada)	Gold	40,000^{‡}
United States (RIAA)	Gold	500,000^{‡} / 153,000
^{‡} Sales+streaming figures based on certification alone.
