= Bringing Back the Sunshine =

Studio album by Blake Shelton
- Released: September 30, 2014
- Recorded: 2014
- Genre: Country
- Length: 42:48
- Label: Warner Bros. Nashville
- Producer: Scott Hendricks

Blake Shelton chronology
Based on a True Story... (2013)	Bringing Back the Sunshine (2014)	Reloaded: 20#1 Hits (2015)

Singles from Bringing Back the Sunshine
- 1. "Neon Light" Released: August 18, 2014; 2. "Lonely Tonight" Released: November 17, 2014; 3. "Sangria" Released: April 6, 2015; 4. "Gonna" Released: August 3, 2015

Bringing Back the Sunshine is the ninth studio album by American country music singer Blake Shelton. The album was released on September 30, 2014, by Warner Bros. Nashville. The album was produced by Shelton's longtime producer Scott Hendricks. "Neon Light," the album's lead-off single, was released on August 18, 2014. The album's second single, "Lonely Tonight", received a Grammy Award nomination for Best Country Duo/Group Performance.

Professional ratings
Aggregate scores
Source	Rating
Metacritic	(62/100)
Review scores
Source	Rating
AllMusic	3.5/5 stars
Billboard	3.5/5 stars
Calgary Herald	(mixed)
Country Weekly	B
PopMatters	4/10 stars
Rolling Stone	3/5 stars
Roughstock	(favorable)
Taste of Country	(favorable)
Country Universe	2.5/5 stars

== Background ==
The title and September 30, 2014 release date for Bringing Back the Sunshine were both announced on August 1, 2014, one day after Shelton performed a free concert on the beach in Atlantic City to an audience of over 60,000 and the same day that he performed a concert at Madison Square Garden. The album's release date was timed for one week after the premiere of The Voice's seventh season.

== Content ==
Shelton described Bringing Back the Sunshine as "a throwback" to his first few albums, saying, "I want to sing all kinds of songs" but also "I got very far away from what I used to sound like". Reflecting on how country artists had shifted the genre away from its roots over the years, Shelton called himself "guilty of it as anybody" and explained that the album title was chosen to evoke "bringing back" a more traditional style of country music, saying, "The whole album is searching for parts of me that I think have… not gotten lost along the way, but stuff that I haven't addressed in my music as much as I used to, whether it's drinking songs, heartbreak songs or songs about how people treat you. Things like that." He further explained that the tone of Bringing Back the Sunshine deviates from that of Red River Blue and Based on a True Story..., saying, "My last couple of albums have been so positive, because when I made them I was just getting married...But after a while, as a country singer, I gotta get back to singing about getting drunk because there's people out there — and I've been one of them — that have had their heart broken, or they've had a tough day at work, or they get stabbed in the back."

Lead single, "Neon Light", was described by USA Today as "the kind of barroom song that Shelton hasn't released as a single since 2007's "The More I Drink."

The album's second single, "Lonely Tonight", features Ashley Monroe, and the track "Buzzin'" features RaeLynn. Both artists had been featured on the single "Boys 'Round Here" from Shelton's previous album, Based on a True Story... Monroe is a member of the Pistol Annies, a musical group that includes Shelton's then-wife Miranda Lambert. RaeLynn was mentored by Shelton on the second season of The Voice.

"A Girl" features backing vocals from one of its co-writers, Sarah Buxton.

The album's third single, "Sangria", was described by Shelton as "one of the sexiest songs" he had ever recorded. Shelton likened the song to the work of Chris Isaak, saying that the song "sounds like something that came from a different time".

"Good Country Song" was written specifically for Shelton and references his favorite music artist, Earl Thomas Conley.

"Anyone Else" was described by USA Today as a song about jealousy within the music industry, although Billboard wrote that the song could also be interpreted as being about "the breakdown of a romantic relationship". Shelton has said, "Nobody will ever know who I'm singing about whenever I'm singing that song." Originally Lambert was going to record the song for her album Platinum. Shelton says that there were two or three songs intended for Platinum that he wanted for himself, including Smokin' and Drinkin', and that he "guilted" Lambert into letting him record "Anyone Else", noting that he had earlier given her a song that he was originally going to record, "The House That Built Me".

The album cover for Bringing Back the Sunshine depicts the water tower in Shelton's hometown of Ada, Oklahoma.

== Commercial performance ==
Bringing Back the Sunshine debuted at No. 1 on Billboard's all genre Top 200 and Top Country Albums charts with a first week sales total of 101,000 copies in the United States. The album was certified Gold by the RIAA on January 7, 2015, and Platinum on October 7, 2016.

In Canada, the album debuted at No. 4 on the Canadian Albums Chart, selling 7,700 copies in its first week.

== Track listing ==
No.	Title	Writer(s)	Length
1.	"Bringing Back the Sunshine"	Jess Leary; Anthony Smith	4:01
2.	"Neon Light"	Andrew Dorff; Mark Irwin; Josh Kear	3:41
3.	"Lonely Tonight" (featuring Ashley Monroe)	Brent Anderson; Ryan Hurd	3:38
4.	"Gonna"	Luke Laird; Craig Wiseman	3:03
5.	"A Girl"	Jessi Alexander; Sarah Buxton; Abe Stoklasa	3:36
6.	"Sangria"	J. T. Harding; Josh Osborne; Trevor Rosen	3:54
7.	"Buzzin'" (featuring RaeLynn)	Wiseman; Kendell Marvel	3:47
8.	"Just South of Heaven"	Wiseman; Derek George	4:10
9.	"I Need My Girl"	Rhett Akins; Ross Copperman; Ben Hayslip	3:33
10.	"Good Country Song"	Alexander; Tommy Lee James; Matt Jenkins	3:38
11.	"Anyone Else"	Laird; Barry Dean; Natalie Hemby	4:21
12.	"Just Gettin' Started"	Buddy Owens; Jenee Fleenor; Phil O'Donnell	3:26
Total length:			42:48

Walmart Deluxe Edition
No.	Title	Writer(s)	Length
13.	"Messed Up"	Laird; Thomas Harding; Shane McAnally	3:13
14.	"I Really Shouldn't Drink Around You"	Laird; McAnally; Trevor Rosen	3:54
15.	"Pain"	Al Anderson; Chris Stapleton	3:11

== Personnel ==
Credits adapted from Tidal.

=== Musicians ===
- Tom Bukovac – electric guitar
- Sarah Buxton – background vocals
- Perry Coleman – background vocals
- Vicki Hampton – background vocals
- J. T. Harding – background vocals
- Aubrey Haynie – fiddle
- Natalie Hemby – background vocals
- Mike Henderson – electric guitar
- Wes Hightower – background vocals
- Charlie Judge – synthesizer
- Troy Lancaster – electric guitar
- Shane McAnally – background vocals
- Ashley Monroe – vocals on "Lonely Tonight"
- Gordon Mote – Hammond B3, keyboards, piano
- Russ Pahl – pedal steel guitar
- RaeLynn – vocals on "Buzzin'"
- Blake Shelton – lead vocals
- Jimmie Lee Sloas – bass guitar
- Bryan Sutton – acoustic guitar, banjo
- Derek Wells – acoustic guitar, electric guitar
- Nir Z – drums, percussion

=== Technical ===
- Drew Bollman – engineering, mixing assistance
- Justin "Corky" Cortelyou – digital editing
- Rich Hanson – engineering
- Scott Hendricks – production, overdub engineering, editing
- Scott Johnson – production assistance
- Andrew Mendelson – mastering
- Justin Niebank – mixing, engineering
- Allen Parker – engineering assistance
- Ben Phillips – digital editing
- Ben Simonetti – engineering assistance
- Jeffery Welch – overdub engineering assistance
- Brian David Willis – digital editing

=== Visuals ===
- Sally Carns Gulde – art direction, design, photography
- Joseph Llanes – photography
- Katherine Petillo – art direction
- Shane Tarleton – creative direction

== Charts and certifications ==
=== Weekly charts ===
Chart (2014–15)	Peak position
Canadian Albums (Billboard)	4
US Billboard 200	1
US Top Country Albums (Billboard)	1

=== Year-end charts ===
Chart (2014)	Position
US Billboard 200	91
US Top Country Albums (Billboard)	18
Chart (2015)	Position
US Billboard 200	54
US Top Country Albums (Billboard)	16

=== Singles ===
Year	Single	Peak chart positions				
Year	Single	US Country	US Country Airplay	US	CAN Country	CAN
2014	"Neon Light"	3	1	43	1	49
2014	"Lonely Tonight"	2	1	47	1	42
2015	"Sangria"	3	1	38	1	43
2015	"Gonna"	4	1	54	1	69

=== Certifications ===
Region	Certification	Certified units/sales
United States (RIAA)	Platinum	1,000,000^{‡}
^{‡} Sales+streaming figures based on certification alone.
