= Texoma Shore =

Album by Blake Shelton

Studio album by Blake Shelton
- Released: November 3, 2017
- Genre: Country
- Length: 38:35
- Label: Warner Bros. Nashville
- Producer: Scott Hendricks

Blake Shelton chronology
If I'm Honest (2016)	Texoma Shore (2017)	Fully Loaded: God's Country (2019)

Singles from Texoma Shore
- 1. "I'll Name the Dogs" Released: September 11, 2017; 2. "I Lived It" Released: January 29, 2018; 3. "Turnin' Me On" Released: July 30, 2018

Texoma Shore is the eleventh studio album by American country music singer Blake Shelton. The album was released on November 3, 2017 by Warner Bros. Records. Its lead single is "I'll Name the Dogs". As with his previous several albums, Scott Hendricks served as producer.

== Content ==
The album is named after Lake Texoma, a lake on the border of Texas and Oklahoma. The lead single to the album is "I'll Name the Dogs", which was written by Josh Thompson, Ben Hayslip, and Matt Dragstrem. Shelton described the album to Entertainment Tonight by saying, "There's a song or two on there that are directly personal, but, you know, for the most part I just made an album that feels how I feel now – that's just happy and go with the flow."

Due to daily spins on iHeartMedia stations, five other tracks from the album all charted on Country Airplay dated for November 18, 2017: "At the House", "I Lived It", "Turnin' Me On", "Money", and "Why Me" all charted at numbers 33 through 37 for that chart. This made Shelton the first artist to have six songs in the top 60 of the chart at the same time, after Kenny Chesney and Lady Antebellum, who each charted seven tracks in 2004 and 2011 respectively.

== Critical reception ==
Rating it 3 out of 4 stars, Glenn Gamboa of Newsday felt that Shelton's "charm is on full display". Cillea Houghton of Sounds Like Nashville wrote that he "embodies a sound that's grounded and down-to-earth, much like the beloved early hits that turned him into one of the genre's modern day staples." Matt Bjorke of Roughstock also reviewed the album with favor, saying that a "majority of the album feels ready for radio", while also highlighting his singing on "Why Me" and "Turnin' Me On".

== Commercial performance ==
Texoma Shore debuted at number four on the US Billboard 200 with 63,000 album-equivalent units; 55,000 of that figure were pure album sales. It is Shelton's 11th US top 10 album. It has sold 257,100 copies in the United States as of April 2019.

== Track listing ==
No.	Title	Writer(s)	Length
1.	"I'll Name the Dogs"	Josh Thompson; Ben Hayslip; Matt Dragstrem	3:04
2.	"At the House"	Craig Wiseman; Jamie Moore	3:09
3.	"Beside You Babe"	Abe Stoklasa; Mark Trussell	2:57
4.	"Why Me"	Ashley Gorley; Ross Copperman; Dallas Davidson	3:27
5.	"Money"	Wiseman; Ryan Ogren; Nick Bailey	3:30
6.	"Turnin' Me On"	Jessi Alexander; Josh Osborne; Blake Shelton	4:49
7.	"The Wave"	Copperman; Osborne	3:50
8.	"Got the T-Shirt"	Alexander; Matt Jenkins; Chase McGill	3:12
9.	"Hangover Due"	Wiseman; Dragstrem	4:03
10.	"When the Wine Wears Off"	Rhett Akins; Gorley; Copperman	2:55
11.	"I Lived It"	Akins; Gorley; Hayslip; Copperman	3:39

== Personnel ==
Adapted from AllMusic

- Jessi Alexander - background vocals
- Perry Coleman - background vocals
- Paul DiGiovanni - programming
- Charles Dixon - violin, viola
- Matt Dragstrem - acoustic guitar, electric guitar, percussion
- Jeneé Fleenor - fiddle
- Kenny Greenberg - baritone guitar, electric guitar
- Troy Lancaster - electric guitar
- Jamie Moore - synthesizer, whistle
- Gordon Mote - Hammond B-3 organ, piano, synthesizer, Wurlitzer
- Jimmy Olander - electric guitar on "I'll Name the Dogs"
- Russ Pahl - pedal steel guitar
- RaeLynn - background vocals
- Sari Reist - cello
- Blake Shelton - lead vocals
- Jimmie Lee Sloas - bass guitar
- Abe Stoklasa - background vocals
- Bryan Sutton - banjo, acoustic guitar, mandolin
- Ilya Toshinsky - banjo, bouzouki, 12-string guitar, acoustic guitar, resonator guitar, hi-string acoustic guitar
- Mark Trussell - acoustic guitar, synthesizer bass, background vocals
- Derek Wells - acoustic guitar, electric guitar
- Craig Wiseman - acoustic guitar, background vocals
- Nir Z. - drums, percussion, programming

== Charts ==
=== Weekly charts ===
Weekly chart performance for Texoma Shore
Chart (2017)	Peak position
Australian Albums (ARIA)	23
Canadian Albums (Billboard)	11
New Zealand Heatseeker Albums (RMNZ)	4
US Billboard 200	4
US Top Country Albums (Billboard)	1

=== Year-end charts ===
2017 year-end chart performance for Texoma Shore
Chart (2017)	Position
US Top Country Albums (Billboard)	69

2018 year-end chart performance for Texoma Shore
Chart (2018)	Position
US Billboard 200	149
US Top Country Albums (Billboard)	17

== Certifications ==
Certifications for Texoma Shore
Region	Certification	Certified units/sales
United States (RIAA)	Gold	500,000^{‡}
^{‡} Sales+streaming figures based on certification alone.
