= It's All Good (Joe Nichols album) =

Studio album by Joe Nichols
- Released: November 8, 2011
- Genre: Country
- Length: 32:40
- Label: Show Dog-Universal Music
- Producers: Mark Wright, Buddy Cannon

Joe Nichols chronology
Greatest Hits (2011)	It's All Good (2011)	Crickets (2013)

Singles from It's All Good
- 1. "Take It Off" Released: May 23, 2011

Professional ratings
Review scores
Source	Rating
AllMusic	3.5/5 stars

It's All Good is the seventh studio album by American country music artist Joe Nichols, released on November 8, 2011 by Show Dog-Universal Music. It produced the top 30 single "Take It Off." Craig Morgan also recorded the track "This Ole Boy" for his album of the same name.

== Track listing ==
No.	Title	Writer(s)	Length
1.	"Take It Off"	Dallas Davidson; Ashley Gorley; Kelley Lovelace	3:19
2.	"The More I Look"	Jim Beavers; Rodney Clawson; Davidson	3:03
3.	"Somebody's Mama"	David Lee Murphy; Kim Tribble	3:52
4.	"It's All Good"	Gary Burr; Georgia Middleman	2:28
5.	"This Ole Boy"	Rhett Akins; Davidson; Ben Hayslip	3:40
6.	"I Can't Take My Eyes Off You"	James Dean Hicks; Tim Johnson; Jon Wolfe	3:06
7.	"No Truck, No Boat, No Girl"	Jay Knowles; Adam Wright	3:04
8.	"Never Gonna Get Enough"	Mark Nesler; Deric Ruttan	3:02
9.	"She's Just Like That"	Jaron Boyer; Tyler Farr; Thomas Rhett	3:18
10.	"How I Wanna Go"	Tim James; Rivers Rutherford	3:48
Total length:			32:40

== Personnel ==
- Tim Akers - accordion
- Wyatt Beard - background vocals
- Jim "Moose" Brown - Hammond B-3 organ
- Pat Buchanan - electric guitar
- Buddy Cannon - background vocals
- Melonie Cannon - background vocals
- Perry Coleman - background vocals
- J.T. Corenflos - electric guitar
- Tony Creasman - drums
- Eric Darken - percussion
- Dan Dugmore - steel guitar, lap steel guitar
- Shannon Forrest - drums
- Paul Franklin - steel guitar, lap steel guitar
- Kevin "Swine" Grantt - bass guitar
- Kenny Greenberg - electric guitar
- Aubrey Haynie - fiddle
- Wes Hightower - background vocals
- Mike Johnson - steel guitar
- Alison Krauss - background vocals
- Paul Leim - drums
- Randy McCormick - Hammond B-3 organ, Wurlitzer
- Steve Nathan - keyboards, Hammond B-3 organ, synthesizer, Wurlitzer
- Joe Nichols - lead vocals
- Larry Paxton - bass guitar
- Gary Prim - piano
- Mickey Raphael - harmonica
- Michael Rhodes - bass guitar
- John Wesley Ryles - background vocals
- Joe Spivey - fiddle
- Russell Terrell - background vocals
- Bobby Terry - acoustic guitar, electric guitar
- Ilya Toshinsky - banjo, acoustic guitar, mandolin
- Dan Tyminski - background vocals
- Scott Vestal - banjo
- Billy Joe Walker Jr. - acoustic guitar
- Lonnie Wilson - drums

== Charts ==
=== Album ===
Chart (2011)	Peak position
US Billboard 200	78
US Top Country Albums (Billboard)	19

=== Singles ===
Year	Single	Peak chart positions	
Year	Single	US Country	US
2011	"Take It Off"^{A}	25	122

- ^{A}Did not enter the Hot 100 but charted on Bubbling Under Hot 100 Singles.
