= This Ole Boy (song) =

Single by Craig Morgan

from the album This Ole Boy
- Released: July 18, 2011
- Genre: Country
- Length: 4:23 (album version); 3:23 (radio edit)
- Label: Black River
- Songwriter: Rhett Akins; Dallas Davidson; Ben Hayslip
- Producer: Craig Morgan; Phil O'Donnell

Craig Morgan singles chronology
"Still a Little Chicken Left on That Bone" (2010)	"This Ole Boy" (2011)	"Corn Star" (2012)

"This Ole Boy" is a song written by Rhett Akins, Dallas Davidson and Ben Hayslip. Originally recorded by Joe Nichols for his 2011 album It's All Good, it was also recorded by Craig Morgan. His version of the song was released in July 2011 as the first single and title track from his 2012 album of the same name.

== Content ==
Rhett Akins, Dallas Davidson and Ben Hayslip, collectively known as The Peach Pickers, wrote the song. According to Hayslip, Davidson "had the groove going", and all three drew from personal experiences: "It’s just a fun song about growing up like we did. We got those butterflies from that girl … you drove her around … you did go to the river … you did start thinking about wanting to marry her." While on the road with Morgan, Akins heard him singing the song while preparing coffee on the bus, and decided that the song was "meant for" him.

== Critical reception ==
Bobby Peacock of Roughstock gave it four stars out of five, saying that "it's a move back away from the strident sound he's been forging lately" and "It's not a very original idea, but it's very well-executed". A less favorable review came from Billy Dukes of Taste of Country, who said "the whole song is sweet and unoffensive, but it’s too familiar for a man who’s beginning a new chapter of his career".

== Music video ==
The song's music video features Morgan performing the song on a fishing dock, with actress Angie Harmon portraying his love interest. It was filmed in Arrington, Tennessee.

== Chart performance ==
Chart (2011–2012)	Peak position
Canada Country (Billboard)	28
US Billboard Hot 100	87
US Hot Country Songs (Billboard)	13

=== Year-end charts ===
Chart (2012)	Position
US Country Songs (Billboard)	55
