= Turnin' Me On (Blake Shelton song) =

Single by Blake Shelton

from the album Texoma Shore
- Released: July 30, 2018
- Genre: Country
- Length: 4:49
- Label: Warner Bros. Nashville
- Songwriters: Blake Shelton; Josh Osborne; Jessi Alexander
- Producer: Scott Hendricks

Blake Shelton singles chronology
"I Lived It" (2018)	"Turnin' Me On" (2018)	"God's Country" (2019)

"Turnin' Me On" is a song by American singer Blake Shelton for his tenth studio album, Texoma Shore (2017). Scott Hendricks produced the song and Shelton wrote it with Josh Osborne and Jessi Alexander. Initially, the song was distributed as a promotional single for Texoma Shore before being sent to country music radio stations in July 2018.

Many critics compared the song to the music of Ronnie Milsap. "Turnin' Me On" did not reach the Billboard Hot 100 in the United States, but rather the Bubbling Under Hot 100 at number one. It also reached the country component charts in the aforementioned country and Canada. As of November 2018, the song has sold 35,000 copies in the United States. An accompanying music video for the song, filmed in a vertical video format, was released in October 2018.

== Background and release ==
In the final few days leading up to the release of Texoma Shore, Shelton released a new song from the album each day as part of a promotional effort. "Turnin' Me On" was initially distributed as a digital download and for streaming on November 1, 2017, as the third promotional single for the album.

In October 2018, Shelton released an acoustic video for the song, which features him performing the song at the Henson Recording Studio.

== Musical structure and lyrics ==
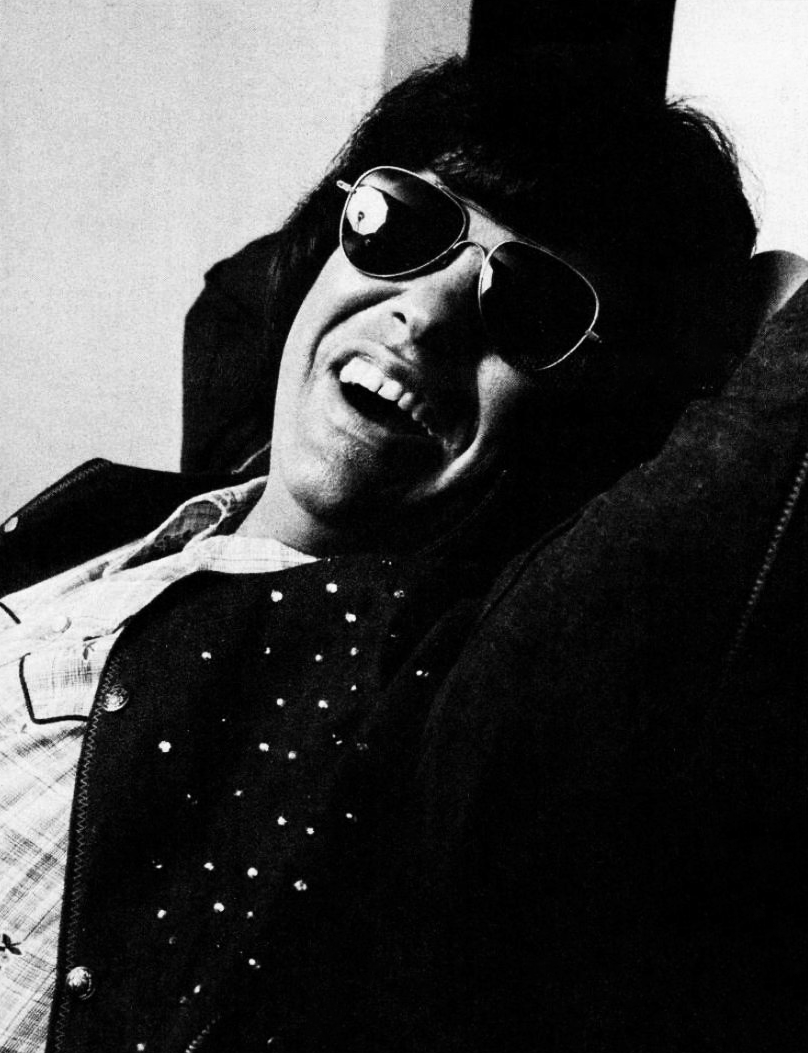
Several critics compared "Turnin' Me On" with the works of Ronnie Milsap (shown).

Shelton said that he was inspired to write a song about his girlfriend, actress and singer Gwen Stefani in 2017. He began writing a melody on his guitar while on his tour bus, and invited Josh Osborne and Jessi Alexander to help him finish the song. Roughstock's Matt Bjorke compared Shelton's vocals in "Turnin' Me On" to those of Ronnie Milsap and predicted it was another song written about Stefani. The song indirectly references Stefani by name-dropping the cosmetics company Revlon, for whom Stefani is a spokesperson. Glenn Gamboa from Newsday also drew comparisons to the works of Milsap, calling it a "throwback [...] ballad".

According to the official sheet music for "Turnin' Me On", it is set in common time and has a moderate tempo of 112 beats per minute. The key of the song is in B minor and progresses in the chord progressions of Bm–A–Bm–A followed by G–A–Bm–A in the verses and choruses. During the bridge, it changes to G–A–A–Bm.

== Critical reception ==
Bjorke from Roughstock described the single as sexy and a part of the majority of the album that "feels ready for radio". Gamboa of Newsday questioned the track listing placement of "Turnin' Me On" on Texoma Shore, which directly follows "Money", a track he felt was much different in style. However, he did not mind the diverse pair, writing: "And somehow, he makes it work."

== Commercial performance ==
In the United States, "Turnin' Me On" did not enter the Billboard Hot 100, but instead the Bubbling Under Hot 100 component chart, which ranks the best-performing songs that have not yet entered the main chart. This became Shelton's first single to reach the Bubbling Under section instead of the Hot 100 since "The More I Drink", a track from his fourth studio album, Pure BS (2007). It debuted at number 22 for the week ending October 6, 2018, and reentered two weeks later at the same position. On November 24, 2018, the song jumped from number three to the top position, becoming Shelton's sixth number-one entry on the Bubbling Under Hot 100 chart. It held the top position for two weeks total. By November 13, 2018, "Turnin' Me On" had sold 35,000 copies in the United States.

During the release week of "Turnin' Me On" as a promotional single, it received enough radio play on US country music stations to enter Billboard's Country Airplay chart at number 35. In 2018, it reentered the charts following its release to radio stations, this time peaking at number ten. It also entered Billboard's main Hot Country Songs chart in the United States, where the track reached number 14. It was the lowest performing single from Texoma Shore on this chart, and his first single to not reach the top ten since "Savior's Shadow" in 2016. In Canada, "Turnin' Me On" reached the equivalent Canada Country chart, where it peaked at number 20. Similarly, it was his first single to miss entering the top ten of the chart since "I'll Just Hold On" peaked at number 40 in 2009.

== Music video ==
The acoustic vertical music video was directed by Chris Rogers and premiered on CMT, GAC & CMT Music in October 2018.

== Charts ==
=== Weekly charts ===
Chart performance for "Turnin' Me On"
Chart (2018–2019)	Peak position
Canada Country (Billboard)	20
US Bubbling Under Hot 100 (Billboard)	1
US Country Airplay (Billboard)	10
US Hot Country Songs (Billboard)	14

=== Year-end charts ===
Year-end chart performance for "Turnin' Me On"
Chart (2018)	Position
US Hot Country Songs (Billboard)	86
Chart (2019)	Position
US Hot Country Songs (Billboard)	94

== Release history ==
Release dates and formats for "Turnin' Me On"
Region	Date	Format(s)	Label	Ref.
United States	November 1, 2017	Digital download; streaming	Warner Bros. Nashville	
United States	July 30, 2018	Country radio	Warner Bros. Nashville	
