= Believers (Joe Nichols song) =

Single by Joe Nichols

from the album Old Things New
- Released: April 20, 2009
- Genre: Country
- Length: 3:06
- Label: Universal South
- Songwriters: Ashley Gorley, Wade Kirby, Bill Luther
- Producer: Brent Rowan

Joe Nichols singles chronology
"It Ain't No Crime" (2007)	"Believers" (2009)	"Gimmie That Girl" (2009)

"Believers" is a song recorded by American country music artist Joe Nichols. It was released on April 20, 2009, as the first single from the album Old Things New. The song reached #26 on the Billboard Hot Country Songs chart. The song was written by Ashley Gorley, Wade Kirby and Bill Luther.

== Chart performance ==
Chart (2009)	Peak position
US Hot Country Songs (Billboard)	26
