= Take It Off (Joe Nichols song) =

Single by Joe Nichols

from the album It's All Good
- Released: May 23, 2011
- Genre: Country
- Length: 3:18
- Label: Show Dog-Universal Music
- Songwriters: Dallas Davidson; Ashley Gorley; Kelley Lovelace
- Producers: Mark Wright; Buddy Cannon

Joe Nichols singles chronology
| "The Shape I'm In" (2010) | "Take It Off" (2011) | "Sunny and 75" (2013) |

"Take It Off" is a song recorded by American country music artist Joe Nichols. It was released in May 2011 as the only single from his seventh studio album, It's All Good. The song was written by Dallas Davidson, Ashley Gorley and Kelley Lovelace.

"Take It Off" debuted at number 60 on the U.S. Billboard Hot Country Songs chart for the week of June 4, 2011.

== Background ==
Of the song, Nichols says, "It takes me back to when I was a kid, and we would go out to the lake or the river and chill out all day. We'd do some stuff that we weren't supposed to be doing."

== Critical reception ==
Kyle Ward of Roughstock gave the song three and a half stars out of five, calling it "a pleasant up-tempo piece of summertime ear candy." In his review of the album, Ben Foster of Country Universe wrote that the song is "a fun enough tune, but it's too forgettable, not to mention interchangeable with any other summer song."

== Music video ==
The music video, which premiered in August 2011, was directed by Potsy Ponciroli and filmed in downtown Nashville.

== Charts ==
=== Weekly charts ===
| Chart (2011) | Peak position |
|---|---|
| US Hot Country Songs (Billboard) | 25 |
| US Billboard Bubbling Under Hot 100 | 22 |

=== Year-end charts ===
| Chart (2011) | Position |
|---|---|
| US Country Songs (Billboard) | 88 |
