= The Peach Pickers =

American songwriting team

- Origin: Valdosta, Georgia, U.S.
- Genres: Country
- Years active: 2004–present
- Members: Rhett Akins; Dallas Davidson; Ben Hayslip

The Peach Pickers are an American songwriting team, composed of Rhett Akins, Dallas Davidson, and Ben Hayslip.

Akins and Hayslip met while attending high school together in Valdosta, Georgia, before Akins signed a contract with Decca Records in the mid-1990s. Davidson began songwriting in college, where he was roommates with singer Luke Bryan at Georgia Southern University. He and Akins met in 2004 when the two co-wrote "Kiss My Country Ass", which both Akins and Blake Shelton recorded. After Akins brought Davidson to a songwriting session, the three began holding songwriting meetings every Wednesday. Among the songs that they have written together are Shelton's "All About Tonight", Josh Turner's "All Over Me", Jack Ingram's "Barefoot and Crazy", Brooks & Dunn's "Put a Girl in It", Joe Nichols' "Gimmie That Girl", and Bryan's "I Don't Want This Night to End". All three members of the team also have co-writers' credits outside their collaborations.

In 2022, the trio began touring as a performing act on Luke Bryan's tour.
