= Put a Girl in It =

Single by Brooks & Dunn

from the album Cowboy Town
- Released: May 5, 2008
- Genre: Country
- Length: 3:29
- Label: Arista Nashville 88697-30797
- Songwriters: Rhett Akins; Dallas Davidson; Ben Hayslip
- Producers: Kix Brooks; Tony Brown; Ronnie Dunn

Brooks & Dunn singles chronology
"God Must Be Busy" (2007)	"Put a Girl in It" (2008)	"Cowgirls Don't Cry" (2008)

"Put a Girl in It" is a song co-written by singer Rhett Akins along with Dallas Davidson and Ben Hayslip, who are collectively known as The Peach Pickers, and recorded by American country music duo Brooks & Dunn. It was released in May 2008 as the third single from their album Cowboy Town. It reached number 3 on the U.S. Billboard Hot Country Songs chart.

== Content ==
The song is an up-tempo accompanied by electric guitar. Its lyrics tell of various situations that, according to the narrator, are "nothing" until "you put a girl in it".

== Critical reception ==
Kevin John Coyne, reviewing the song for Country Universe, gave it a B rating. He said that it is "a pandering attempt to wrangle as much female adulation as possible from the predominantly female country music listening demographic." But he also added that "the song is ultimately fun and Ronnie Dunn’s vocal performance is admirably strong."

== Chart performance ==
"Put a Girl in It" debuted at number 48 on the U.S. Billboard Hot Country Songs chart for the week of May 10, 2008. Twenty-five of the radio stations monitored by Billboard added this song, boosting it to number 37 the next week, and it became the most added song of that week.

Chart (2008)	Peak position
US Hot Country Songs (Billboard)	3
US Billboard Hot 100	54
Canada Country (Billboard)	1
Canada Hot 100 (Billboard)	62

=== Year-end charts ===
Chart (2008)	Position
US Country Songs (Billboard)	30
Canada Country (Billboard)	2
