= God Must Be Busy =

Single by Brooks & Dunn

from the album Cowboy Town
- Released: November 5, 2007
- Recorded: 2007
- Genre: Country
- Length: 3:42
- Label: Arista Nashville
- Songwriters: Clint Daniels; Michael P. Heeney
- Producers: Kix Brooks; Ronnie Dunn; Tony Brown

Brooks & Dunn singles chronology
"Proud of the House We Built" (2007)	"God Must Be Busy" (2007)	"Put a Girl in It" (2008)

"God Must Be Busy" is a song written by Clint Daniels and Michael P. Heeney, and recorded by American country music duo Brooks & Dunn. It was released in November 2007 as the second single from the album Cowboy Town. It reached a peak of number 11 on the Hot Country Songs charts in 2008.

== Content ==
Featuring lead vocals from Ronnie Dunn, "God Must Be Busy" tells of a man who is praying to God, asking for help in a failed relationship. Having not yet found a solution to his problems, he begins to list off various problems in the world, saying that God must be busy with those problems.

== Chart performance ==
Chart (2007–2008)	Peak position
US Hot Country Songs (Billboard)	11
US Billboard Hot 100	78
Canada Country (Billboard)	11
Canada Hot 100 (Billboard)	92

=== Year-end charts ===
Chart (2008)	Position
US Country Songs (Billboard)	52

== Parodies ==
- American parody artist Cledus T. Judd released a parody of "God Must Be Busy" titled "Garth Must Be Busy" as a duet with Ronnie Dunn on his 2009 album Polyrically Uncorrect.
