= Cowboy Town =

Studio album by Brooks & Dunn
- Released: October 2, 2007
- Genres: Country, rock and roll
- Length: 43:27
- Label: Arista Nashville
- Producers: Kix Brooks, Tony Brown, Ronnie Dunn

Brooks & Dunn chronology
Hillbilly Deluxe (2005)	Cowboy Town (2007)	Playlist: The Very Best of Brooks & Dunn (2008)

Singles from Cowboy Town
- 1. "Proud of the House We Built" Released: June 18, 2007; 2. "God Must Be Busy" Released: November 5, 2007; 3. "Put a Girl in It" Released: May 5, 2008; 4. "Cowgirls Don't Cry" Released: October 20, 2008

Professional ratings
Review scores
Source	Rating
AllMusic	3/5 stars

Cowboy Town is the eleventh studio album by American country music duo Brooks & Dunn, released in 2007 by Arista Nashville. Produced by the duo and Tony Brown, the album has accounted for four Top 20 country singles on the Billboard country singles charts: "Proud of the House We Built," "God Must Be Busy," "Put a Girl in It," and "Cowgirls Don't Cry." The album debuted at number 13 on the Billboard albums chart, selling 68,900 copies in the first week of release.

Brooks & Dunn pushed their musical style farther toward rock and roll music on Cowboy Town, especially with a sequence of four rock 'n roll songs in the middle, starting with "Put a Girl in It". This expanded the audience beyond the country music regulars.

Cowboy Town was Brooks and Dunn's last studio album to be released before a five-year hiatus, which lasted from 2010 to 2015. When the duo regrouped, they released their twelfth studio album Reboot in 2019, which featured new versions of their old songs featuring guest artists.

== Content ==
As with all of Brooks & Dunn's albums since the late 1990s, this album features songs co-written by Terry McBride, former lead singer of McBride & the Ride. Texas country singer Jerry Jeff Walker is featured on "The Ballad of Jerry Jeff Walker".

One of the McBride co-writes, "Proud of the House We Built," was issued in late 2007 as the lead-off single, and reached a peak of number 4 on the Billboard Hot Country Songs charts. "God Must Be Busy" and "Put a Girl in It" were released as the album's second and third singles, respectively. "God Must Be Busy" peaked at number 11, while "Put a Girl in It" reached number 3. "Cowgirls Don't Cry," another McBride co-write, was released as the fourth and final single. After the duo performed the song with Reba McEntire (who was also the song's inspiration) at the Country Music Association awards in November 2008, a re-recording with McEntire's vocals was shipped to radio, and from November 2008 onward, the song was credited to Brooks & Dunn and Reba McEntire. It was the highest-peaking single from Cowboy Town, reaching a peak of number 2.

== Track listing ==
No.	Title	Writer(s)	Length
1.	"Cowboy Town"	Ronnie Dunn; Larry Boone; Paul Nelson	3:19
2.	"Proud of the House We Built"	Dunn; Marv Green; Terry McBride	3:47
3.	"Johnny Cash Junkie (Buck Owens Freak)"	Dunn; Larry Boone; Nelson	2:58
4.	"Cowgirls Don't Cry" (featuring Reba McEntire)	Dunn; McBride	3:41
5.	"Put a Girl in It"	Rhett Akins; Dallas Davidson; Ben Hayslip	3:29
6.	"The Ballad of Jerry Jeff Walker" (featuring Jerry Jeff Walker)	Kix Brooks; Bob DiPiero	3:41
7.	"Tequila"	Dunn; McBride	2:48
8.	"Drop in the Bucket"	Brooks; DiPiero	4:26
9.	"Drunk on Love"	Darrell Brown; Radney Foster	3:53
10.	"Chance of a Lifetime"	Brooks; DiPiero	3:51
11.	"American Dreamer"	Brooks; Jim Beavers; Don Cook	3:41
12.	"God Must Be Busy"	Clint Daniels; Michael P. Heeney	3:53
Total length:			43:27

Wal-Mart exclusive bonus tracks
No.	Title	Writer(s)	Length
13.	"Cowboy, Cowboy"	Dunn; McBride	4:15
14.	"Damn Right I'm Gonna Miss You"	Julian Gallagher; Craig Wiseman	4:10
15.	"Walk Away Slow"	Brooks; DiPiero; Cook	4:00
Total length:			55:52

== Personnel ==
Brooks & Dunn

- Kix Brooks — lead vocals, background vocals
- Ronnie Dunn — lead vocals, background vocals

Additional Musicians

- Robert Bailey — background vocals
- Eddie Bayers — drums
- Larry Beaird — acoustic guitar
- Mike Brignardello — bass guitar
- Tom Bukovac — acoustic guitar, electric guitar
- Mark Casstevens — acoustic guitar
- J.T. Corenflos — electric guitar
- Chad Cromwell — drums
- Eric Darken — percussion
- Dan Dugmore — steel guitar, lap steel guitar
- Haley Dunn — background vocals
- Kim Fleming — background vocals
- Paul Franklin — steel guitar, lap steel guitar
- Kenny Greenberg — acoustic guitar, electric guitar
- Rob Hajacos — fiddle
- Owen Hale — drums
- Vicki Hampton — background vocals
- Tony Harrell — keyboards, Hammond organ, piano
- Aubrey Haynie — fiddle

- Wes Hightower — background vocals
- John Barlow Jarvis — piano
- Jeff Kersey — background vocals
- Terry McBride — bass guitar, background vocals
- Reba McEntire — vocals on "Cowgirls Don't Cry"
- Chris McHugh — drums
- Jerry McPherson — electric guitar
- Brent Mason — electric guitar
- James Mitchell — electric guitar
- Greg Morrow — drums, percussion
- Gary Morse — steel guitar, lap steel guitar
- Wendy Moten — background vocals
- Jimmy Nichols — Fender Rhodes, keyboards, Hammond organ, piano
- Russ Pahl — steel guitar, lap steel guitar
- Kim Parent — background vocals

- Larry Paxton — bass guitar
- Pat Peterson — background vocals
- Alison Prestwood — bass guitar
- Michael Rhodes — bass guitar
- John Wesley Ryles — background vocals
- Rex Schnelle — electric guitar, percussion
- Paul Scholton — drums
- Hank Singer — fiddle
- Jimmie Lee Sloas — bass guitar
- Harry Stinson — background vocals
- Bryan Sutton — acoustic guitar, mandolin
- Crystal Taliefero — background vocals
- Russell Terrell — background vocals
- Lou Toomey — electric guitar
- Ilya Toshinsky — banjo, acoustic guitar
- Jerry Jeff Walker — vocals on "The Ballad of Jerry Jeff Walker"
- John Willis — banjo
- Glenn Worf — bass guitar
- Reese Wynans — Hammond organ, piano

== Chart performance ==
=== Weekly charts ===
Chart (2007)	Peak position
Australian Albums (ARIA)	23
Australian Country Albums (ARIA)	1
US Billboard 200	13
US Top Country Albums (Billboard)	4

=== Year-end charts ===
Chart (2007)	Position
US Top Country Albums (Billboard)	65
Chart (2008)	Position
US Top Country Albums (Billboard)	49
Chart (2009)	Position
US Top Country Albums (Billboard)	74

== Certifications ==
Region	Certification	Certified units/sales
Australia (ARIA)	Gold	35,000^{^}
United States (RIAA)	Gold	500,000^{‡}
^{^} Shipments figures based on certification alone.^{‡} Sales+streaming figures based on certification alone.
