= Proud of the House We Built =

Single by Brooks & Dunn

from the album Cowboy Town
- Released: June 18, 2007
- Recorded: 2007
- Genre: Country
- Length: 3:47
- Label: Arista Nashville 88697-11162
- Songwriters: Ronnie Dunn; Marv Green; Terry McBride
- Producers: Kix Brooks; Tony Brown; Ronnie Dunn

Brooks & Dunn singles chronology
"Hillbilly Deluxe" (2006)	"Proud of the House We Built" (2007)	"God Must Be Busy" (2007)

"Proud of the House We Built" is a song written by Ronnie Dunn, Terry McBride and Marv Green and recorded by the American country music duo Brooks & Dunn. It was released in June 2007 as the first single from their album Cowboy Town. The song reached a peak of number 4 on the Billboard Hot Country Songs charts.

== Content ==
The song is a mid-tempo, featuring lead vocals from Dunn, describing a couple who are just starting a family. In the beginning, the narrator states that although it was difficult to start the family, he and his wife survived the stress that comes with raising a family, and overall, they are satisfied with how far they have come.

== Critical reception ==
Kevin John Coyne, reviewing the song for Country Universe, gave it a B− rating. He said that it is "a decently good lyric that celebrates a love that started with nothing and still is fairly modest, but worthy of pride nonetheless." He also added that the melody was weak and the production was a problem.

== Chart performance ==
"Proud of the House We Built" debuted at number 48 on the U.S. Billboard Hot Country Songs for the week of June 16, 2007.

Chart (2007)	Peak position
US Hot Country Songs (Billboard)	4
US Billboard Hot 100	57
Canada Country (Billboard)	1
Canada Hot 100 (Billboard)	60

=== Year-end charts ===
Chart (2007)	Position
US Country Songs (Billboard)	26
