= Old Things New =

Studio album by Joe Nichols
- Released: October 27, 2009
- Genre: Country
- Length: 33:49
- Label: Universal South
- Producers: Brent Rowan (tracks 3, 5, 6, 8-10); Mark Wright (tracks 1, 2, 4, 7)

Joe Nichols chronology
Real Things (2007)	Old Things New (2009)	Greatest Hits (2011)

Digital cover

Singles from Old Things New
- 1. "Believers" Released: April 20, 2009; 2. "Gimmie That Girl" Released: October 19, 2009; 3. "The Shape I'm In" Released: July 19, 2010

Professional ratings
Review scores
Source	Rating
AllMusic	3.5/5 stars
Slant Magazine	4/5 stars
Roughstock	(favorable)

Old Things New is the sixth studio album by American country music artist Joe Nichols. The album was released on October 27, 2009 through Universal South Records. It produced two singles: "Believers", which peaked at number 26 on the Billboard Hot Country Songs chart, and "Gimmie That Girl" which became his third number-one song in May 2010. "The Shape I'm In" is the album's third single to radio on July 19, 2010.

== Track listing ==
No.	Title	Writer(s)	Length
1.	"Gimmie That Girl"	Rhett Akins; Dallas Davidson; Ben Hayslip	3:05
2.	"It's Me I'm Worried About"	Tony Martin; Mark Nesler; Tom Shapiro	3:10
3.	"Old Things New"	Bill Anderson; Buddy Cannon; Paul Overstreet	3:52
4.	"Man Woman"	Shawn Camp; Marv Green	3:32
5.	"Believers"	Ashley Gorley; Wade Kirby; Bill Luther	3:06
6.	"Cheaper Than a Shrink"	Anderson; Cannon; Jamey Johnson	3:07
7.	"The Shape I'm In"	Akins; Davidson; Hayslip	3:10
8.	"This Bed's Too Big"	Gary Burr; Victoria Shaw	3:39
9.	"We All Go Home"	Neal Coty; Jimmy Melton; Michael Mobley	3:38
10.	"An Old Friend of Mine"	Brock Stalvey; Rick Tiger	3:30
Total length:			33:49

Digital bonus track
No.	Title	Writer(s)	Length
11.	"Tequila Makes Her Clothes Fall Off" (Fat Shan Remix) (featuring Colt Ford)	Gary Hannan; John Wayne Higgins	3:05

== Personnel ==
Adapted from liner notes

- Lisa Cochran - background vocals (tracks 5, 9)
- J. T. Corenflos - electric guitar (track 9), baritone guitar (track 9)
- Eric Darken - percussion (all tracks except 9 & 10)
- Greg Droman - electric guitar (track 4)
- Dan Dugmore - steel guitar (tracks 3, 4, 6, 7, 9)
- Shannon Forrest - drums (tracks 3, 5, 6, 8, 9), percussion (track 9)
- Larry Franklin - fiddle (tracks 1, 2)
- Paul Franklin - steel guitar (tracks 1, 2)
- Vince Gill - background vocals (track 3)
- Kenny Greenberg - electric guitar (track 7)
- Aubrey Haynie - fiddle (tracks 3, 4, 6), mandolin (tracks 5, 7, 9)
- Wes Hightower - background vocals (all tracks except 3 & 10)
- David Hungate - bass guitar (tracks 3, 6, 9)
- Mike Johnson - steel guitar (tracks 5, 8)
- Charlie Judge - keyboards (track 5)
- Shane Keister - Fender Rhodes (track 3), piano (tracks 6, 9)
- Tim Lauer - harmonica (track 7), piano (track 3), B-3 organ (tracks 3, 9), Wurlitzer (track 6)
- B. James Lowry - acoustic guitar (tracks 5, 8)
- Brent Mason - electric guitar (tracks 1, 2, 4, 7)
- Mac McAnally - acoustic guitar (tracks 3, 6, 9)
- James Mitchell - electric guitar (tracks 5, 8)
- Gordon Mote - piano (tracks 5, 8, 10)
- Steve Nathan - piano (track 2), B-3 organ (tracks 1, 4), Wurlitzer (track 7)
- Joe Nichols - lead vocals (all tracks)
- Michael Rhodes - bass guitar (tracks 1, 2, 4, 7)
- Brent Rowan - 6-string bass (track 6), electric guitar (tracks 3, 5, 6, 8, 9), harmonium (track 3), solo (tracks 5, 8, 9)
- Russell Terrell - background vocals (tracks 1, 2, 4, 7)
- Ilya Toshinsky - acoustic guitar (tracks 1, 2, 4, 7)
- Lonnie Wilson - drums (tracks 1, 2, 4, 7)
- Craig Young - bass guitar (track 5, 8)

== Chart performance ==
=== Album ===
Chart (2009)	Peak position
US Billboard 200	71
US Top Country Albums (Billboard)	15

=== End of year charts ===
Chart (2010)	Position
US Top Country Albums (Billboard)	72
