= Troy Olsen =

American singer-songwriter

- Born: July 12, 1973 (age 53); Morenci, Arizona, U.S.
- Origin: Duncan, Arizona, U.S.
- Genres: Country
- Occupation: Singer-songwriter
- Instruments: Vocals, guitar
- Years active: 2009–present
- Label: EMI Nashville

Troy Olsen (born July 12, 1973) is an American country music singer-songwriter signed to EMI Nashville, He co-wrote Blake Shelton's 2009 hit single "I'll Just Hold On" and Tim McGraw's "Ghost Town Train," a cut from the album Southern Voice.He also has cuts by many artists including Kid Rock, Michael English, Allison Moorer, Chris Young, Patty Loveless, and Aaron Watson. He has also written several songs for major motion pictures.

Olsen released his debut single, "Summer Thing," in April 2010, followed by a digital self-titled extended play on May 11. "Summer Thing" debuted at No. 57 on the Billboard Hot Country Songs charts dated for the week ending May 15, 2010. Olsen wrote the song with Ben Hayslip and Jimmy Yeary.

== Discography ==
=== Extended plays ===
| Title | Album details |
|---|---|
| Troy Olsen EP | Release date: May 11, 2010; Label: EMI Nashville |
| Troy Olsen EP No. 2 | Release date: October 5, 2010; Label: EMI Nashville |

=== Singles ===
| Year | Single | Peak positions | Album |
| Year | Single | US Country | Album |
|---|---|---|---|
| 2010 | "Summer Thing" | 35 | Troy Olsen EP |
| 2010 | "Good Hands" | 36 | Troy Olsen EP No. 2 |

=== Music videos ===
| Year | Video | Director |
|---|---|---|
| 2010 | "Summer Thing" | Potsy Ponciroli |
| 2010 | "Good Hands" | Jim Wright |
