= Startin' Fires =

Studio album by Blake Shelton
- Released: November 18, 2008
- Genre: Country
- Length: 43:44
- Label: Warner Bros. Nashville
- Producers: Scott Hendricks; Brent Rowan; Bobby Braddock

Blake Shelton chronology
| Pure BS (2007) | Startin' Fires (2008) | Hillbilly Bone (2010) |

Singles from Startin' Fires
- 1. "She Wouldn't Be Gone" Released: August 18, 2008; 2. "I'll Just Hold On" Released: February 23, 2009

Professional ratings
Review scores
| Source | Rating |
|---|---|
| Allmusic | 3.5/5 stars |
| Entertainment Weekly | B− |
| Roughstock | (positive) |
| About.com | 4/5 stars |

Startin' Fires is the fifth studio album by American country music singer Blake Shelton. The album was released on November 18, 2008 via Warner Bros. Nashville. Its lead-off single, "She Wouldn't Be Gone", became Shelton's fifth number one hit on the Billboard Hot Country Songs chart for the week of February 7, 2009. "I'll Just Hold On" was released as the album's second single. For Starting Fires, Shelton co-wrote two tracks.

== Content ==
In an interview with CMT, Shelton explained the album title saying, "it just seemed like the right statement for what we're trying to do with my career right now. And I never felt confident enough to make a statement like that on an album title - not until now. I feel like I'm coming with the most momentum that I've ever had on a record."

The first single, "She Wouldn't Be Gone", debuted at number 52 on the Billboard Hot Country Songs chart for the week of August 23, 2008. It reached a peak of Number One on the chart week of February 7, 2009. "I'll Just Hold On" was released in February 2009 as the second single, which debuted at number 60 and peaked at number 8.

One of the album's songs, "I Don't Care", was first featured on Shelton's previous album, Pure BS. According to About.com, Shelton explained that he wanted the song to be "given its due", since it had not been released as a single. The song was not re-recorded for Startin' Fires.

Scott Hendricks produced all but two tracks on the album. "This Is Gonna Take All Night" was produced by Brent Rowan, and "I Don't Care" was produced by Bobby Braddock. Shelton co-wrote the track "Bare Skin Rug" with his future wife, Miranda Lambert, who also sings duet vocals on it.

== Track listing ==
| No. | Title | Writer(s) | Length |
|---|---|---|---|
| 1. | "Green" | George Teren, Craig Wiseman | 3:00 |
| 2. | "Good at Startin' Fires" | Sherrié Austin, Will Rambeaux, John Stephan | 3:02 |
| 3. | "She Wouldn't Be Gone" | Jennifer Adan, Cory Batten | 3:36 |
| 4. | "I'll Just Hold On" | Ben Hayslip, Troy Olsen, Bryan Simpson | 4:00 |
| 5. | "100 Miles" | Chris Stapleton, Wiseman | 3:29 |
| 6. | "Never Lovin' You" | Kendell Marvel, Stapleton | 4:39 |
| 7. | "Country Strong" | Rhett Akins, Dallas Davidson, Hayslip | 3:14 |
| 8. | "Home Sweet Home" | Akins, Davidson, Hayslip | 3:55 |
| 9. | "This Is Gonna Take All Night" | Chris DuBois, Ashley Gorley | 3:17 |
| 10. | "Here I Am" | Blake Shelton, Dean Dillon | 3:52 |
| 11. | "I Don't Care" | Casey Beathard, Dillon | 3:53 |
| 12. | "Bare Skin Rug" (duet with Miranda Lambert) | Shelton, Lambert | 3:47 |
| Total length: | | | 43:44 |

== Personnel ==
- David Angell – violin
- Monisa Angell – viola
- Bobby Braddock – string arrangements, strings
- Tom Bukovac – electric guitar, sitar
- Lisa Cochran – background vocals
- Perry Coleman – background vocals
- Melodie Crittenden – background vocals
- Eric Darken – percussion, shaker
- David Davidson – violin
- Chip Davis – background vocals
- Shannon Forrest – drums, percussion
- Paul Franklin – steel guitar
- Aubrey Haynie – fiddle, mandolin
- Wes Hightower – background vocals
- Mike Johnson – pedal steel guitar
- Miranda Lambert – vocals on "Bare Skin Rug"
- Tim Lauer – Hammond B-3 organ, string arrangements, strings
- B. James Lowry – acoustic guitar
- Chris McHugh – drums, percussion
- Anthony LaMarchina – cello
- Brent Mason – acoustic guitar, electric guitar
- Greg Morrow – drums, percussion
- Gordon Mote – Hammond B-3 organ, piano
- Brent Rowan – acoustic guitar, electric guitar
- Blake Shelton – acoustic guitar, lead vocals
- Jimmie Lee Sloas – bass guitar
- Bryan Sutton – acoustic guitar
- Russell Terrell – background vocals
- Ilya Toshinsky – acoustic guitar
- Kristin Wilkinson – viola
- Glenn Worf – bass guitar
- Craig Young – bass guitar
- Jonathan Yudkin – mandolin

== Chart performance ==
=== Weekly charts ===
| Chart (2008) | Peak position |
|---|---|
| US Billboard 200 | 34 |
| US Top Country Albums (Billboard) | 7 |

=== Year-end charts ===
| Chart (2009) | Position |
|---|---|
| US Top Country Albums (Billboard) | 33 |

=== Singles ===
| Year | Single | Peak chart positions | | |
| Year | Single | US Country | US | CAN |
|---|---|---|---|---|
| 2008 | "She Wouldn't Be Gone" | 1 | 43 | 70 |
| 2009 | "I'll Just Hold On" | 8 | 76 | — |
"—" denotes releases that did not chart
