= Gonna (song) =

Single by Blake Shelton

from the album Bringing Back the Sunshine
- Released: August 3, 2015
- Recorded: 2014
- Genre: Country
- Length: 3:03
- Label: Warner Bros. Nashville
- Songwriters: Luke Laird; Craig Wiseman
- Producer: Scott Hendricks

Blake Shelton singles chronology
"Sangria" (2015)	"Gonna" (2015)	"Came Here to Forget" (2016)

"Gonna" is a song recorded by the American country music artist Blake Shelton. It was released to radio on August 3, 2015, as the fourth and final single from his ninth studio album, Bringing Back the Sunshine. The song was written by Luke Laird and Craig Wiseman. A concept music video premiered on September 30, 2014. The song is certified Gold by the RIAA.

== Content ==
Laird and Wiseman, who previously wrote Shelton's 2009 single "Hillbilly Bone", told Nash Country Weekly magazine that they did not have a song idea when they met during a songwriting session. Laird began beatboxing, providing Wiseman with a "structure" to which he began adding lyrics. Laird said that "We just wanted to write something that was fun for us to play", while praising Wiseman's "quirky lyrics". Thematically, the song is about a man professing his intent to start a relationship with a woman, basing the hook around the word "gonna". Nash Country Weekly described the song as a "mid-tempo with a slight reggae influence" plus "a faint vocal beatbox" and "a simple, memorable lead guitar riff that plays again before each verse".

== Reception ==
=== Critical ===
The country music blog, Taste of Country, reviewed the song positively, saying that ""Gonna" is a song built for radio success. Lyrics fill every breath, breathing energy into every note. If fans didn't love the risks Shelton took on previous singles from this album, they'll enjoy this return to Country Main St." Nash Country Weekly writer Jon Freeman rated the single "B", saying, "It may not be a master's thesis in songwriting, but 'Gonna' works perfectly well as harmless summer fun goes."

=== Commercial ===
In America, "Gonna" debuted at number 59 on the Billboard Country Airplay chart for the week ending August 8, 2015. It also debuted at number 48 on the US Billboard Hot Country Songs chart for the week ending August 15, 2015. It debuted on the Hot 100 at No. 86 on the October 3, 2015 chart. It topped the Country Airplay for chart dated December 26, 2015, making it his 16th consecutive No. 1 on the chart. It reached No. 4 on the Hot Country Songs chart, and No. 54 on the Hot 100. It has sold 200,000 copies in the US up to January 2016.

It debuted at number 40 on the Canada Country chart for the week ending August 22, 2015, and became his 21st number one single in Canada in the week ending November 21, 2015.

== Chart performance ==
=== Weekly charts ===
Chart (2015–2016)	Peak position
Canada Hot 100 (Billboard)	69
Canada Country (Billboard)	1
US Billboard Hot 100	54
US Country Airplay (Billboard)	1
US Hot Country Songs (Billboard)	4

=== Year-end charts ===
Chart (2015)	Position
US Country Airplay (Billboard)	54
US Hot Country Songs (Billboard)	63

Chart (2016)	Position
US Country Airplay (Billboard)	60
US Hot Country Songs (Billboard)	70
