= Sangria (song) =

Single by Blake Shelton

from the album Bringing Back the Sunshine
- Released: April 6, 2015
- Recorded: 2014
- Genre: Country
- Length: 3:54
- Label: Warner Bros. Nashville
- Songwriters: J. T. Harding; Josh Osborne; Trevor Rosen
- Producer: Scott Hendricks

Blake Shelton singles chronology
"Lonely Tonight" (2014)	"Sangria" (2015)	"Gonna" (2015)

"Sangria" is a song recorded by American country music artist Blake Shelton. It was released to country radio on April 6, 2015, as the third single from his ninth studio album, Bringing Back the Sunshine. The song was written by J. T. Harding, Josh Osborne and Trevor Rosen. It climbed to No. 1 position in Canada Country and US Country Airplay charts and also at No. 38 on Billboard Hot 100.

== Writing and recording ==
The idea for "Sangria" was originated by Josh Osborne during a songwriting session with Shane McAnally and Sara Evans. At first, Osborne planned to write the song for a female vocalist, but Evans lacked interest in the idea, so Osborne revisited it during a later songwriting session with J.T. Harding and Trevor Rosen. As the writing team developed the idea into a song, they decided to write it for a male vocalist, since they lacked a female co-writer.

It was kind of a different idea at that point. It was more of the girl saying to a guy, why don't you come over and help me drink my sangria or whatever...But I couldn’t quite figure out how to write it with three guys writing it, and I thought 'we're not going to write a great girl song'...If the guy was saying it, it would be like 'Your lips taste like Sangria.'

— Osborne

Osborne, Harding, and Rosen wrote "Sangria" in a single songwriting session. Kenny Chesney recorded a version of the song but never released it, deciding that it would not be right for the album was working on at the time. He considered including the song on his next album but decided against doing so after Shelton recorded his own version.

== Critical reception ==
Giving it an "A", Tammy Ragusa of Country Weekly wrote that "With a subtle and appropriately Spanish flavor, reminiscent of Tracy Byrd's 'Just Let Me Be in Love', this cha-cha is super-sexy, thanks in large part to a suggestive lyric."

== Commercial performance ==
The single peaked at number one on the Country Airplay chart on July 11, 2015, and it is Shelton's twentieth No. 1 hit on the chart, and his fifteenth consecutive single to achieve the feat, which is unmatched by other artists. It also peaked at number 38 on the Billboard Hot 100 the same week. The song was certified Gold by the RIAA on June 25, 2015, and Platinum on January 29, 2016. The song has sold 846,000 copies in the US as of May 2016.

== Music video ==
The music video was directed by Trey Fanjoy and premiered in March 2015.

== Charts and certifications ==
=== Weekly charts ===
Chart (2015)	Peak position
Canada Hot 100 (Billboard)	43
Canada Country (Billboard)	1
US Billboard Hot 100	38
US Country Airplay (Billboard)	1
US Hot Country Songs (Billboard)	3

=== Year-end charts ===
Chart (2015)	Position
US Country Airplay (Billboard)	40
US Hot Country Songs (Billboard)	6

=== Certifications ===
Region	Certification	Certified units/sales
Canada (Music Canada)	Gold	40,000^{*}
United States (RIAA)	2× Platinum	2,000,000^{‡} / 846,000
^{*} Sales figures based on certification alone.
