= I'll Just Hold On =

Single by Blake Shelton

from the album Startin' Fires
- Released: February 23, 2009
- Recorded: 2008
- Genre: Country pop
- Length: 4:00
- Label: Warner Bros. Nashville
- Songwriters: Ben Hayslip; Troy Olsen; Bryan Simpson
- Producer: Scott Hendricks

Blake Shelton singles chronology
"She Wouldn't Be Gone" (2008)	"I'll Just Hold On" (2009)	"Hillbilly Bone" (2009)

"I'll Just Hold On" is a song written by Ben Hayslip, Troy Olsen and Bryan Simpson, and recorded by American country music singer Blake Shelton. It was released in February 2009 as the second single from his fifth studio album Startin' Fires.

== Content ==
The song is a mid-tempo ballad in which the male narrator expresses his love for a free-spirited woman who does not want to stay with anyone. He tells her, "I'll just hold on / Until you're gone." The song features a sitar in the intro, with fiddle and electric guitar flourishes as well.

== Critical reception ==
Lynn Douglas of Country Universe gave the song a C+ rating. His review of the song states that "[Shelton] has tenfold the personality and talent that this prosaic song and standard Nashville country-pop production would have us believe." Matt Bjorke of Roughstock gave a mixed review, saying that the use of sitar gave the song a distinctive sound, but added "the lyric has been said before and I have to wonder if the release of this song won’t return Shelton back to the valley portion of his career."

== Chart performance ==
"I'll Just Hold On" debuted at #60 on the Hot Country Songs chart dated March 7, 2009, and reached a peak of #8 on the chart in September 2009.

Chart (2009)	Peak position
Canada Country (Billboard)	40
US Billboard Hot 100	76
US Hot Country Songs (Billboard)	8

=== Year-end charts ===
Chart (2009)	Position
US Country Songs (Billboard)	23
