= Drink on It =

Single by Blake Shelton

from the album Red River Blue
- Released: January 9, 2012
- Recorded: 2011
- Genre: Country
- Length: 3:31
- Label: Warner Bros. Nashville
- Songwriters: Jessi Alexander; Rodney Clawson; Jon Randall
- Producer: Scott Hendricks

Blake Shelton singles chronology
"God Gave Me You" (2011)	"Drink on It" (2012)	"Over" (2012)

"Drink on It" is a song written by Jessi Alexander, Rodney Clawson, and Jon Randall and recorded by American country music artist Blake Shelton. It was released in January 2012 as the third single from Shelton's 2011 album Red River Blue. The song reached number one on the US Billboard Hot Country Songs chart in May 2012. No official music video was made for the song.

== Critical reception ==
Billy Dukes of Taste of Country gave the song three stars out of five, saying that "the ever-charming voice of Shelton is in top form on this ballad." Kyle Ward of Roughstock also gave the song three stars out of five, calling it "a solid, but slightly underwhelming track, the kind that you sing along to without even realizing it’s playing on the radio."

== Chart performance ==
"Drink on It" debuted at number 56 on the U.S. Billboard Hot Country Songs chart for the week of January 7, 2012. It also debuted at number 81 on the U.S. Billboard Hot 100 chart for the week of February 11, 2012. It also debuted at number 92 on the Canadian Hot 100 chart for the week of March 10, 2012.

Chart (2012)	Peak position
Canada Country (Billboard)	1
Canada Hot 100 (Billboard)	53
US Billboard Hot 100	39
US Hot Country Songs (Billboard)	1

=== Year-end charts ===
Chart (2012)	Position
US Country Songs (Billboard)	29

=== Certifications ===
Region	Certification	Certified units/sales
United States (RIAA)	Platinum	1,000,000^{‡}
^{‡} Sales+streaming figures based on certification alone.
