= Over (Blake Shelton song) =

Single by Blake Shelton

from the album Red River Blue
- Released: May 21, 2012
- Recorded: 2011
- Genre: Country pop; country rock
- Length: 3:13
- Label: Warner Bros. Nashville
- Songwriters: Paul Jenkins; David Elliott Johnson
- Producer: Scott Hendricks

Blake Shelton singles chronology
"Drink on It" (2012)	"Over" (2012)	"Just a Fool" (2012)

"Over" is a song written by Paul Jenkins and David Elliott Johnson and recorded by American country music artist Blake Shelton. It was released in May 2012 as the fourth and final single from Shelton's 2011 album Red River Blue. The song reached number one on the US Billboard Hot Country Songs chart in September 2012. It was originally released in 2007 as a track on Burn Out Bright, the debut and only album released by Jenkins's band, The Royce.

== Critical reception ==
Billy Dukes of Taste of Country gave the song three stars out of five, calling it "an extraordinary recording of an ordinary song." Ashley Cooke of Roughstock gave the song two stars out of five, writing that it "doesn't really fit [Shelton's] style or personality." Kevin John Coyne of Country Universe gave the song a D grade, calling it "mediocre" and comparing it to a nineties lukewarm rock ballad.

== Music video ==
The music video was directed by Roman White and premiered on June 15, 2012.

== Covers ==
Terry McDermott covered the song in the 3rd season of The Voice.

== Chart performance ==
"Over" debuted at number 53 on the U.S. Billboard Hot Country Songs chart for the week of May 19, 2012. On the chart dated September 1, 2012, "Over" became Shelton's seventh consecutive number one single, and his twelfth overall.

Chart (2012)	Peak position
Canada Hot 100 (Billboard)	59
US Billboard Hot 100	43
US Hot Country Songs (Billboard)	1

=== Year-end charts ===
Chart (2012)	Position
US Country Songs (Billboard)	36

=== Certifications ===
Region	Certification	Certified units/sales
United States (RIAA)	Platinum	1,000,000^{‡}
^{‡} Sales+streaming figures based on certification alone.
