= Honey Bee (song) =

Single by Blake Shelton

from the album Red River Blue
- Released: April 4, 2011
- Recorded: 2010
- Genre: Country
- Length: 3:30
- Label: Reprise Nashville
- Songwriters: Rhett Akins; Ben Hayslip
- Producer: Scott Hendricks

Blake Shelton singles chronology
"Who Are You When I'm Not Looking" (2010)	"Honey Bee" (2011)	"God Gave Me You" (2011)

"Honey Bee" is a song written by Rhett Akins and Ben Hayslip and recorded by American country music artist Blake Shelton. It was released in April 2011 as the first single from Shelton's 2011 album Red River Blue. The song reached number one on the US Billboard Hot Country Songs chart in June 2011. On November 30, the song received a Grammy Award nomination for Best Country Solo Performance, but it lost to Taylor Swift's "Mean".

== History ==
Blake Shelton debuted "Honey Bee" at the Academy of Country Music awards telecast on April 3, 2011, where he also sang "Who Are You When I'm Not Looking". "Honey Bee" was released to digital retailers immediately after the broadcast.

== Content ==
Rhett Akins and Ben Hayslip, two-thirds of the "Peach Pickers" writing ensemble, wrote the song. Akins said that he first thought of writing a song called "Huckleberry" after seeing an article in Billboard magazine about former Arkansas governor Mike Huckabee. Misreading the name as "Huckleberry" made Akins think of a line from the film Tombstone. He then changed the word to "honeysuckle", and came up with the line "You be my honeysuckle, and I'll be your honey bee." Akins said that he thought that "it was a different way for the guy to say, 'we should date, I love you.'"

The lines "You'll be my Louisiana, I'll be your Mississippi / You'll be my Little Loretta, I'll be your Conway Twitty" refers to the Conway Twitty and Loretta Lynn duet "Louisiana Woman, Mississippi Man" on the album of the same name.

Explaining that "Honey Bee" was written specifically for Shelton, Akins said of the song, "We didn't even think we'd demo it because we figured nobody on earth would cut it but Blake. We thought it was a little too quirky for anyone else."

== Music video ==
The music video premiered on NBC.com on May 10, 2011. It was filmed in California, and directed by Trey Fanjoy.

The video features Shelton stopping at a roadside stand, where a dazzlingly-smiling and sweetly-attractive young woman (portrayed by Amra Silajdžić) is selling honey and other related products. Totally smitten with the lady's lovely "innocent country girl" features and warm pleasant manner, Shelton purchases a jar of "Tupelo Honey" from the seller. Shelton then frequently returns to the stand over the next few days, buying more and more products (which, as the video changes scenes from the stand to Shelton's living room, the room becomes more and more filled with products from the stand) from the lady in order to ingratiate himself with her, until one day he passes the stand and sees an "out of business" sign. The seller approaches with another sign ("Sorry, out of honey") and Shelton finally invites her to come with him for a ride in his pickup truck, which she readily accepts; the idea is that he has thus scored the ultimate "honey", in that he views the smilingly-gentle and kindly-natured damsel as being infinitely "sweeter" than all of the honey she'd been selling could ever possibly be.

== Reception ==
=== Critical ===
Matt Bjorke of Roughstock rated the single four stars out of five. His review praised the "charisma" in Shelton's voice and thought that the song had a "timeless" feel to it. Slant Magazine reviewer Jonathan Keefe criticized the lyrics, but praised Shelton's vocals. C. M. Wilcox of The 9513 gave the song a thumbs down, saying that the lyrics were written in a "repetitive, fill-in-the-blank structure," and criticized Shelton for recording "ear catching but substantively bankrupt country boy hokum."

=== Commercial performance ===
The song sold 138,000 digital downloads in its first week, setting a record for the most first-week downloads by a male country singer. As a result of the downloads, the song debuted at number thirteen on the Billboard Hot 100 chart dated for the week ending April 23, 2011. This entry makes him the highest-debuting male country artist on the Hot 100 since Garth Brooks (recording as Chris Gaines) debuted at number five in September 1999 with "Lost in You". "Honey Bee" also debuted at number 31 on the Hot Country Songs charts and number 58 on the Canadian Hot 100. By its seventh week, the song had gone digital gold, making it the fastest rising single ever to sell over 500,000 digital copies by a male country soloist. It became Shelton's fourth consecutive and ninth Number One single on the country chart dated June 25, 2011. It has sold 2,372,000 copies in the US as of September 2013.

== Chart performance ==
=== Charts ===
Chart (2011)	Peak position
Canada Country (Billboard)	1
Canada Hot 100 (Billboard)	28
US Billboard Hot 100	13
US Hot Country Songs (Billboard)	1

=== Certifications ===
Region	Certification	Certified units/sales
New Zealand (RMNZ)	Gold	15,000^{‡}
United States (RIAA)	4× Platinum	2,372,000
^{‡} Sales+streaming figures based on certification alone.

=== Year-end charts ===
Chart (2011)	Position
US Billboard Hot 100	67
US Country Songs (Billboard)	8

=== Decade-end charts ===
Chart (2010–2019)	Position
US Hot Country Songs (Billboard)	23
