= The Shape I'm In (Joe Nichols song) =

Single by Joe Nichols

from the album Old Things New
- Released: July 19, 2010
- Genre: Country
- Length: 3:10
- Label: Show Dog-Universal Music
- Songwriters: Rhett Akins; Dallas Davidson; Ben Hayslip
- Producer: Mark Wright

Joe Nichols singles chronology
"Gimmie That Girl" (2009)	"The Shape I'm In" (2010)	"Take It Off" (2011)

"The Shape I'm In" is a song written by Rhett Akins, Dallas Davidson and Ben Hayslip and recorded by American country music singer Joe Nichols. It was released in July 2010 as the third single from Nichols' 2009 album Old Things New.

== Content ==
"The Shape I'm In" explains that his significant other left him and then describes his night out partying after the breakup. The song discusses moving on from the relationship. Nichols told KMPS-FM that he considered it "a very Muscle Shoals kind of song". Co-writer Ben Hayslip told The Boot that the chorus came from his grandfather who said "I'm OK for the shape I'm in ..." when Hayslip asked him how he was. Hayslip said that he had the idea in his notebook for eight to ten years but never used it before. Co-writer Dallas Davidson told The Boot that the morning they wrote the song he was hungover and he had a napkin on his desk that had a girl's phone number on it.

== Critical reception ==
The song has been met with positive reviews among critics. Kyle Ward of Roughstock gave it four stars and thought that the lyrics are "somewhat understated, and but quite effective" and said that the sparse production really "elevates the song because "the "distraction is minimal" Karlie Justus of Engine 145 gave it a thumbs-up, saying that the song has "loads of self-deprecating charm". Kevin John Coyne of Country Universe gave it an A, calling it a "classic country heartbreak theme, quite a few clever lines, and an altogether realistic account of a man begrudgingly coming to terms with the end of a relationship." He also calls it the best record George Strait hadn't recorded in a long time.

== Music video ==
The music video opens and closes with former US Navy Seal Marcus Luttrell talking to the camera and follows a couple of wounded US Army soldiers, Ivan Castro and Chad Fleming as they prepare for their day and a date. Nichols is also seen performing in a bed, and on a porch. It was directed by Trey Fanjoy.

== Chart performance ==
"The Shape I'm In" debuted at number 55 on the U.S. Billboard Hot Country Songs for the week of August 7, 2010. It also debuted at number 98 on the U.S. Billboard Hot 100 for the week of March 12, 2011, and reached number 91 the following week. In March 2011, it peaked at number 17 on the country chart.

Chart (2010–2011)	Peak position
US Hot Country Songs (Billboard)	17
US Billboard Hot 100	91

=== Year-end charts ===
Chart (2011)	Position
US Country Songs (Billboard)	70
