= Gimmie That Girl =

Single by Joe Nichols

from the album Old Things New
- Released: October 19, 2009
- Recorded: January 2009
- Genre: Country
- Length: 2:53 (single edit); 3:05 (album version)
- Label: Universal South (Show Dog-Universal Music) (Note: Universal South Records merged with Show Dog Nashville in December 2009 to form Show Dog-Universal Music.)
- Songwriters: Rhett Akins; Dallas Davidson; Ben Hayslip
- Producer: Mark Wright

Joe Nichols singles chronology
"Believers" (2009)	"Gimmie That Girl" (2009)	"The Shape I'm In" (2010)

"Gimmie That Girl" is a song written by Rhett Akins, Dallas Davidson, and Ben Hayslip and recorded by American country music singer Joe Nichols. It was released in October 2009 as the second single from Nichols’ 2009 album Old Things New. The song became Nichols’ third number one hit on the US Billboard Hot Country Songs chart.

== Content ==
Nichols told Country Standard Time that he considered it "one of the catchiest tunes on the new CD" and that he liked its "simplicity." Rhett Akins and Ben Hayslip began writing the song in 2008; Akins told The Boot that the two had "already been working on this idea of writing a song about telling the girl who's all dressed up because you're going out." They had originally decided to title the song "The You I Want to See" or "The You That I Like Best" until Dallas Davidson added the line "gimmie that girl" to the chorus.

== Critical reception ==
The song has been met with mixed reviews among critics. Jonathan Keefe of Slant Magazine cited the song as a standout track on the album, saying that it "bring[s] a contemporary polish and point of view to a staunchly traditional country aesthetic." Bobby Peacock of Roughstock thought that Nichols' vocals were "cold and mechanical" but said that it had a "fairly lively melody and clean, uncluttered production." Peacock compared the song unfavorably to Sammy Kershaw's 1993 single "She Don't Know She's Beautiful."

== Chart performance ==
"Gimmie That Girl" debuted at #60 on the Billboard Hot Country Songs charts dated for the week of October 24, 2009. On the chart dated for the week ending May 8, 2010, it reached Number One, becoming the third Number One of Nichols's career, and his first since "Tequila Makes Her Clothes Fall Off" in December 2005.

=== Weekly charts ===
Chart (2009–2010)	Peak position
Canada Hot 100 (Billboard)	54
US Billboard Hot 100	34
US Hot Country Songs (Billboard)	1

=== Year-end charts ===
Chart (2010)	Position
US Country Songs (Billboard)	7

=== Decade-end charts ===
Chart (2010–2019)	Position
US Hot Country Songs (Billboard)	49

== Certifications ==
Region	Certification	Certified units/sales
United States (RIAA)	Platinum	1,000,000^{‡}
^{‡} Sales+streaming figures based on certification alone.
