= All About Tonight (EP) =

EP by Blake Shelton
- Released: August 10, 2010
- Genre: Country
- Length: 22:36
- Label: Reprise Nashville
- Producer: Scott Hendricks

Blake Shelton chronology
Hillbilly Bone (2010)	All About Tonight (2010)	Loaded: The Best of Blake Shelton (2010)

Singles from All About Tonight
- 1. "All About Tonight" Released: April 5, 2010; 2. "Who Are You When I'm Not Looking" Released: September 6, 2010

All About Tonight is the second extended play, and eighth studio release by American country music artist Blake Shelton. It was released on August 10, 2010, via Warner Music Group Nashville, under its Reprise label. The first single, "All About Tonight", was released to radio in April 2010 and has become his seventh Number One hit on the U.S. Billboard Hot Country Songs charts. The album's second single, "Who Are You When I'm Not Looking" (previously recorded by Joe Nichols on his 2007 album Real Things), was released to radio in September 2010.

== Background ==
All About Tonight is Shelton's second "Six Pak", a concept that he and his record label decided to experiment with in 2010 starting with Hillbilly Bone. Shelton said, "We're looking for ways to remind people that we still make albums, and there's still cool music that you may or may not hear on the radio. So we decided to do a six-song album, and it's really cheap! It's like five dollars and change".

Shelton returned to releasing full albums after All About Tonight, and in 2012 he reminisced about the six pak concept, saying, "Remember when we were doing the six paks and we thought that was going to be the wave of the future? That was dumb — it wasn't — but we thought it was going to be a big deal then. But the bottom line is we were still making records that we believed in at that time. No matter if there were six songs or 12 songs, they were all songs that we thought were important."

== Content ==
All About Tonight's title track was released as the lead single. Rhett Akins, who wrote the song along with Ben Hayslip and Dallas Davidson, told The Boot, "It's a good, fun party song about where the night is going to go. After we wrote it, we thought it sound[ed] just like a Blake Shelton song. It's his life!" Shelton had previously recorded several songs written by Akins and later remarked, "Every writer will always say, 'Man, I wrote this song for you,'...But with Rhett, maybe he actually did write a song with me in mind, just because I cut so many of his songs...it's a good place to be when there's a certain song that, even if I'm not singing it, somebody goes, 'That sounds like a Blake Shelton song.' That's when you're finally creating that sound that is unique to one specific artist like Travis Tritt and Garth Brooks did."

The EP's second single, "Who Are You When I'm Not Looking", was originally recorded by Joe Nichols on his album Real Things.

"Draggin' the River" was originally intended as a solo for a male artist, but Shelton's then-fiance, Miranda Lambert, suggested recording the song together as a duet. Shelton noted that he and Lambert had rarely recorded together, in part because they wanted to avoid "cheesy love duets", but called their collaboration on this song "meant to be" and said, "if there was ever a song that was a perfect lyric for us and our personalities, it was 'Dragging the River'."

Lambert co-wrote the song "Suffocating" with Hillary Scott of Lady Antebellum. They felt that the song was more suitable for a male artist, and Shelton had them promise that he could be the one to record it. He initially planned to include the song on his preceding EP, Hillybilly Bone. Scott performs harmonies on the track.

== Critical reception ==
Professional ratings
Review scores
Source	Rating
Allmusic	3/5 stars
American Songwriter	2.5/5 stars
Billboard	(favorable)
Entertainment Weekly	B
The New York Times	(favorable)
The Washington Post	(favorable)

Upon its release, All About Tonight received generally positive reviews from most music critics. At Metacritic, which assigns a normalized rating out of 100 to reviews from mainstream critics, the album received an average score of 71, based on 5 reviews, which indicates "generally favorable reviews".

Jon Caramanica with The New York Times said that the release is "a variety-pack of country styles" and said he sounded "flirty and convincing" on the release. Thom Jurek with Allmusic gave it a three star rating, saying "Shelton does two things, and he does them extremely well: rowdy, rocking contemporary tunes about raising hell and making romantic mischief, and singing (mostly) believable ballads". Gary Graff with Billboard gave it a favorable review, saying "the singer's latest set, All About Tonight, is a satisfying sprint without fat or filler but packs plenty of fun." Bill Friskics-Warren with The Washington Post gave it a favorable review, saying "Shelton's latest "six pak" harks back to a time when Nashville rebels could be rowdy and real at the same time".

Matt Popkin with American Songwriter gave it a 2½ star rating, comparing it to a comedy series saying "Blake Shelton's All About Tonight is what I imagine being in the studio audience for an average sitcom would be like [...] And yes, you're aware that somebody worked very hard on these jokes, but still, every time you laugh, you feel like a little part of you just died, and it's located in the left hemisphere of your brain.

== Commercial performance ==
The album debuted at number six on the U.S. Billboard 200, and at number one on the U.S. Billboard Top Country Albums, selling 33,000 copies in its first week of release. The number one debut on the Top Country Albums chart gave Shelton his first number one album of his career. As of the chart dated January 8, 2011, the album has sold 149,385 copies in the US.

== Track listing ==
No.	Title	Writer(s)	Length
1.	"All About Tonight"	Rhett Akins, Ben Hayslip, Dallas Davidson	3:27
2.	"Who Are You When I'm Not Looking"	Earl Bud Lee, John Wiggins	3:09
3.	"That Thing We Do"	Jeff Bates, Patrick Jason Matthews	3:04
4.	"Draggin' The River" (featuring Miranda Lambert)	Jim Beavers, Chris Stapleton	3:45
5.	"Suffocating"	Lambert, Hillary Scott	4:12
6.	"Got a Little Country"	Tony Mullins, Craig Wiseman	4:57

iTunes bonus pre-order track
No.	Title	Writer(s)	Length
7.	"Addicted"	Cheryl Wheeler

== Personnel ==
- Rob Beckham – booking
- Steve Blackmon – assistant
- Brandon Blackstock – management
- Narvel Blackstock – management
- Brooke Boling – design
- Drew Bollman – assistant
- Holly Chapman – grooming
- Steve Crowder – assistant
- Steph Dufresne – assistant
- Russ Harrington – photography
- Scott Hendricks – digital editing, engineer, producer
- Steve Marcantonio – tracking
- Cheryl H. McTyre – a&r admin.
- Jacob Murray – assistant
- Tre Nagella – assistant
- Justin Niebank – mixing
- Allen Parker – assistant
- Katherine Petillo – art direction
- Nick Spezia – assistant
- Todd Tidwell – assistant
- Trish Townsend – stylist
- Hank Williams – mastering
- Brian David Willis – digital editing
- Tim Akers – hammond b-3 Organ, Piano
- Mike Brignardello – bass guitar
- Tom Bukovac – electric guitar
- Perry Coleman – background vocals
- Eric Darken – percussion
- Paul Franklin – pedal steel guitar
- Aubrey Haynie – fiddle
- Miranda Lambert – duet vocals on "draggin' the river"
- Troy Lancaster – electric guitar
- Brent Mason – electric guitar
- Greg Morrow – drums, percussion
- Gordon Mote – hammond b-3 Organ, Piano
- Tony Mullins – background vocals
- Hillary Scott – background vocals
- Blake Shelton – lead vocals
- Jimmie Lee Sloas – bass guitar
- Bryan Sutton – banjo, acoustic guitar, mandolin
- Craig Wiseman – jew's harp, background vocals
- Jennifer Zuffinetti – background vocals

== Chart positions ==
=== Weekly charts ===
Chart (2010)	Peak position
US Billboard 200	6
US Top Country Albums (Billboard)	1

=== End of year charts ===
Chart (2010)	Position
US Top Country Albums (Billboard)	52
Chart (2011)	Position
US Top Country Albums (Billboard)	56

=== Singles ===
Year	Single	Peak chart positions		
Year	Single	US Country	US	CAN
2010	"All About Tonight"	1	37	63
2010	"Who Are You When I'm Not Looking"	1	46	72
