= Who Are You When I'm Not Looking =

Single by Blake Shelton

from the EP All About Tonight
- Released: September 6, 2010
- Genre: Country
- Length: 3:09
- Label: Reprise Nashville
- Songwriters: Earl Bud Lee; John Wiggins
- Producer: Scott Hendricks

Blake Shelton singles chronology
"All About Tonight" (2010)	"Who Are You When I'm Not Looking" (2010)	"Honey Bee" (2011)

"Who Are You When I'm Not Looking" is a song written by Earl Bud Lee and John Wiggins. It was originally recorded by American country music artist Joe Nichols on his 2007 album Real Things. Country music artist Blake Shelton recorded the song for his EP All About Tonight, from which it was released as a single in September 2010. His version reached number one on the US Billboard Hot Country Songs chart in March 2011.

== Content ==
The song is a ballad in which the narrator wants to know the characteristics his lover's hiding from him (e.g. "Do you paint your toes 'cause you bite your nails?").

== Music video ==
The Blake Shelton music video premiered on October 1, 2010 during CMT's Big New Music Weekend. It was voted GAC's No. 1 video of 2010.

== Critical reception ==
Matt Bjorke of Roughstock gave the song a four-out-of-five-star rating, calling it a "list song," but the lyrics "an emotion in which anyone who has been in love will certainly relate to." Jim Malec of American Twang gave the song a thumbs-up review, calling it an "intimate rumination on the mystery of a beautiful, graceful woman." Karlie Justus of Engine 145 gave the song a thumbs-up. She thought that Blake Shelton's performance was "flatter" than Joe Nichols's, but said that the lyrics were "grounded and honest." Gary Graff of Billboard also described the song positively, saying that it "mixes humor and pathos with a sweet melody and a wry attitude."

== Chart performance ==
"Who Are You When I'm Not Looking" debuted at number fifty-one on the U.S. Billboard Hot Country Songs for the week of September 18, 2010. It became Shelton's eighth number one single on the country chart dated March 5, 2011. It has sold 1,098,000 copies in the United States as of June 2013.

Chart (2010–2011)	Peak position
Canada Country (Billboard)	3
Canada Hot 100 (Billboard)	72
US Billboard Hot 100	46
US Hot Country Songs (Billboard)	1

=== Year-end charts ===
Chart (2011)	Position
US Country Songs (Billboard)	32

=== Certifications and sales ===
Region	Certification	Certified units/sales
United States (RIAA)	2× Platinum	1,098,000
