= She Wouldn't Be Gone =

Single by Blake Shelton

from the album Startin' Fires
- Released: August 18, 2008
- Genre: Country
- Length: 3:35
- Label: Warner Bros. Nashville
- Songwriters: Jennifer Adan; Cory Batten
- Producer: Scott Hendricks

Blake Shelton singles chronology
"Home" (2008)	"She Wouldn't Be Gone" (2008)	"I'll Just Hold On" (2009)

"She Wouldn't Be Gone" is a song written by Jennifer Adan and Cory Batten and recorded by American country music singer Blake Shelton. It was released in August 2008 as the first single from Shelton's 2008 album Startin' Fires. The song became Shelton's fifth number one hit on the US Billboard Hot Country Songs chart in February 2009.

== Content ==
"She Wouldn't Be Gone" is a mid-tempo in which the male narrator reflects on his relationship and a lover who has just left him. He expresses regrets over having not attempted to keep her from leaving, saying that if he had tried to keep her (by bringing her flowers, watching sunsets with her, and paying attention to her needs), thinking "maybe she wouldn't be gone".

Co-writer Cory Batten came up with the song's opening line ("Red roadside wildflower, if I had only picked you / Took you home and set you on the counter / Oh, at least a time or two / Maybe she'd have thought it through") after seeing a patch of red wildflowers outside his window. Co-writer Jennifer Adan said that she wanted the song's narrator to have a "feeling of desperation" by realizing after how what he should have done to keep his lover from leaving. When he recorded the song, Shelton said that he had "been able to dump more emotion into that vocal" than any of his previous material.

== Critical reception ==
Brady Vercher of Engine 145 gave the song a "thumbs down". He stated that "Shelton's phrasing and breathing are awkward enough to not make the song easily memorable or singable, decreasing its chances at chart success." Allmusic's Steve Leggett considered it the strongest track on Startin' Fires, saying that it was "a brilliant portrayal of a man who finally finds his passion and love for a woman when it's way too late and she's already gone, and the chorus swells to passionate, almost white-knuckle perfection. It's a great song and Shelton gives it everything."

== Music video ==
The music video was directed by Scott Speer and premiered in late 2008.

== Chart positions ==
Chart (2008–2009)	Peak position
Canada Country (Billboard)	7
Canada Hot 100 (Billboard)	70
US Billboard Hot 100	43
US Hot Country Songs (Billboard)	1

=== Year-end charts ===
Chart (2009)	Position
US Country Songs (Billboard)	35

== Certifications ==
Region	Certification	Certified units/sales
United States (RIAA)	Platinum	1,000,000^{‡}
^{‡} Sales+streaming figures based on certification alone.
