= All About Tonight (Blake Shelton song) =

Single by Blake Shelton

from the EP All About Tonight
- Released: April 5, 2010
- Genre: Country
- Length: 3:27 (album version); 3:20 (single version)
- Label: Warner Bros. Nashville; Reprise Nashville
- Songwriters: Rhett Akins; Dallas Davidson; Ben Hayslip
- Producer: Scott Hendricks

Blake Shelton singles chronology
"Hillbilly Bone" (2009)	"All About Tonight" (2010)	"Who Are You When I'm Not Looking" (2010)

"All About Tonight" is a song written by Rhett Akins, Dallas Davidson, and Ben Hayslip, also known as The Peach Pickers, and recorded by American country music artist Blake Shelton. It serves as the first single from All About Tonight, his second extended play, and seventh studio release.

== Content ==
The lyrics in All About Tonight focus around partying and living in the moment. Co-writer Rhett Akins told The Boot that they wanted to write a song about how they don't care about tomorrow because tomorrow can wait until tomorrow. Akins said "we just went from there and touched on things like I know I'm going to have a headache in the morning, and I'll probably be broke. There's no telling what we're going to do, and I don't even care because it's all about tonight. That's all I'm worried about! It's a good, fun party song about where the night is going to go. After we wrote it, we thought it sounds just like a Blake Shelton song."

== Critical reception ==
Giving the song four and-a-half out of five stars, Matt Bjorke of Roughstock stated that "Even if “All About Tonight” isn’t a ‘deep’ song, it has that southern rock melody mixed with a good time joe attitude that clearly makes “All About Tonight” one of the most obvious hit singles of Blake Shelton’s career to date"

Blake Boldt with Engine 145 gave the song a "thumbs down" rating, saying that "Shelton convinces as a liquored-up barfly who’s itching for his next conquest. In a radio climate that favors long-term love affairs, a song that even suggests a one-night stand is a slightly-bold move. That’s about the only risk taken on “Tonight,” which swings along on a standard modern-country production with a touch of twang. The nifty slide guitar line in the bridge is a neat twist, but the rest of “Tonight” is a forgettable template plugged into a filler tune."

== Music video ==
A live music video for the song was made and premiered on Country Music Television on June 16, 2010. It was directed by Jon Small. This is Blake's first live performance video.

== Chart performance ==
"All About Tonight" debuted at No. 45 on the U.S. Billboard Hot Country Songs chart in April 2010. For the week of August 28, 2010, the song became his seventh Number One on the Hot Country Songs chart.

== Charts ==
=== Weekly charts ===
Chart (2010)	Peak position
Canada Country (Billboard)	3
Canada Hot 100 (Billboard)	63
US Billboard Hot 100	37
US Hot Country Songs (Billboard)	1

=== Year-end charts ===
Chart (2010)	Position
US Country Songs (Billboard)	8

== Certifications ==
Region	Certification	Certified units/sales
United States (RIAA)	Gold	500,000^{‡}
^{‡} Sales+streaming figures based on certification alone.
