= Dallas Davidson =

American singer-songwriter

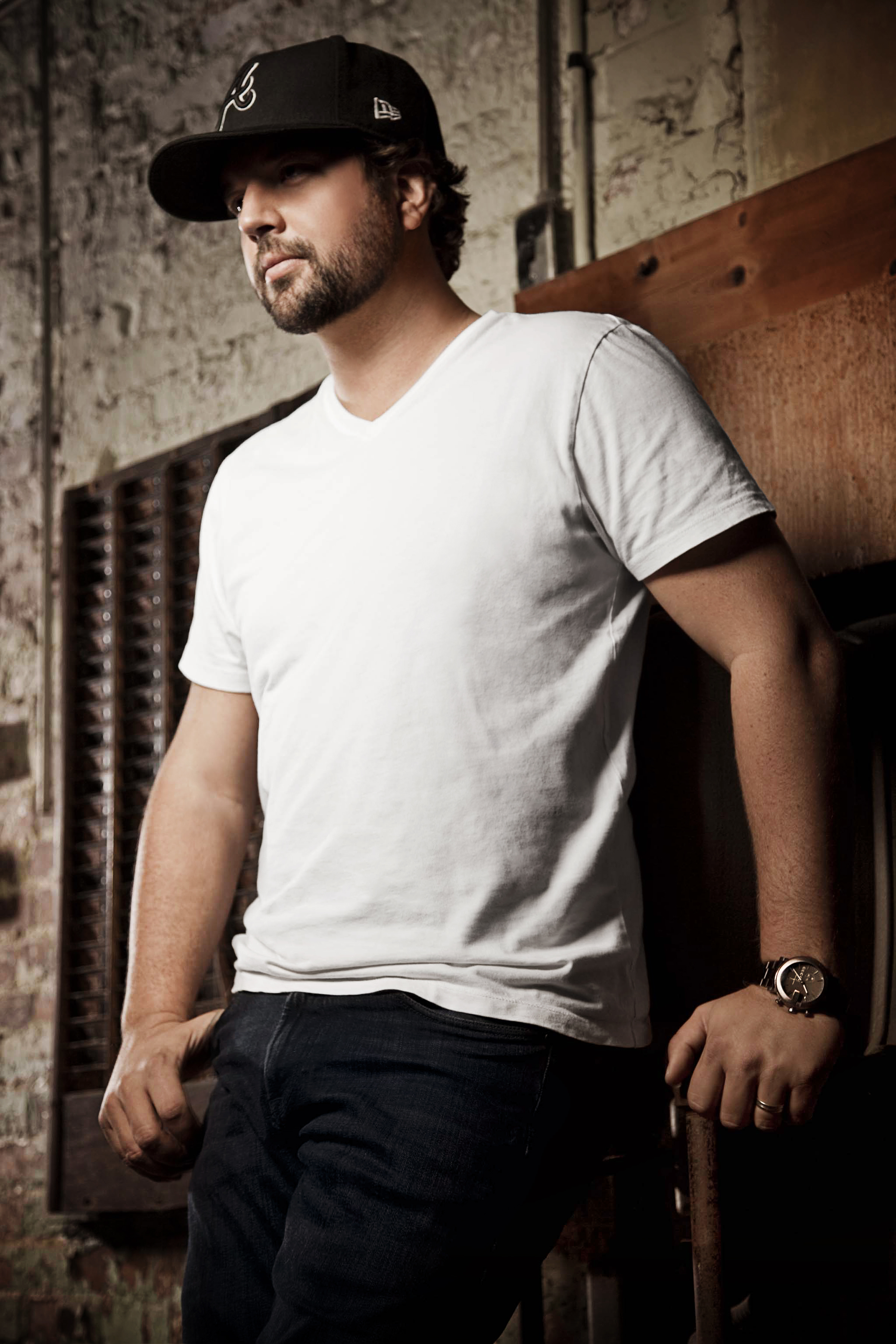

Background information
- Origin: Albany, Georgia, United States
- Genres: Country, pop, R&B
- Occupations: Singer; songwriter
- Years active: 2004–present
- Member of: The Peach Pickers

Dallas Davidson is an American country music singer and songwriter from Albany, Georgia, who has written for artists such as Blake Shelton, Jason Aldean, Cole Swindell, Jake Owen, Luke Bryan, Randy Houser, Lady Antebellum, and Billy Currington. He generally writes with others, notably as a member of The Peach Pickers.

== Career ==
Davidson moved to Nashville, Tennessee in 2004 and joined Broadcast Music Incorporated (BMI) for performing rights representation and signed a publishing deal with Big Borassa Music, which lasted until 2008. Davidson signed with EMI Music Publishing Nashville in 2008 and extended his contract with them in 2012.

Trace Adkins recorded Davidson's "Honky Tonk Badonkadonk" shortly after Davidson arrived in Nashville, taking the song to number 2 on the country charts in early 2006. Davidson co-wrote the Brad Paisley-Keith Urban duet "Start a Band", which reached number 1 in January 2009. This song was nominated for a Grammy in the category Best Country Collaboration with vocals. He also co-wrote Billy Currington's "That's How Country Boys Roll", which went to number 1 in 2010.

Other singles that Davidson co-wrote in the late 2000s included "Put a Girl in It" by Brooks & Dunn, "Barefoot and Crazy" by Jack Ingram and "Gimmie That Girl" by Joe Nichols, all collaborations with Rhett Akins and Ben Hayslip, also known as The Peach Pickers. "Gimmie That Girl" made it to number 1 on the charts in April 2010.

In 2010, Davidson also co-wrote "All About Tonight" by Blake Shelton, "All Over Me" by Josh Turner and "Rain Is a Good Thing" by Luke Bryan. These songs earned Davidson the award for Billboard's Hot Country Music Songwriter of 2010.

Other songs that Davidson co-wrote and featured in the Billboard Hot 100 include Justin Moore's "If Heaven Wasn't So Far Away", Lady Antebellum's "Just a Kiss" and "We Owned the Night". Luke Bryan also recorded Davidson's "Country Girl (Shake It for Me)", "I Don't Want This Night to End" and "That's My Kind of Night". In 2013, he co-wrote "Runnin' Outta Moonlight" by Randy Houser, "Granddaddy's Gun" by Aaron Lewis and "Keep Them Kisses Comin'" by Craig Campbell.

Davidson received the 2012 ACM Songwriter of the Year; a 2012 ACM nominee for Song of the Year (for "Just a Kiss"); the 2011 BMI Country Awards’ Songwriter of the Year together with Rhett Akins. He is also a recipient of three CMA Triple Play Awards, one in 2010 and two in 2011; this award is given to songwriters who write three number-one singles in a one-year span. Davidson is the Chairman of the Georgia Music Foundation. In 2015 he launched his own publishing company, Play It Again.

== Personal life ==
Davidson is married with two sons.

== Discography ==
=== Studio albums ===
Title	Album details
This Ole Boy	Release date: April 1, 2010; Label: String Stretcher Records

=== Collaboration albums ===
Title	Album details	Peak chart positions	
Title	Album details	US Country	US Heat
Michael Waddell's Bone Collector: The Brotherhood Album (with Rhett Akins)	Release date: September 28, 2010; Label: Reprise Nashville	47	19

=== Music videos ===
Year	Video	Director
2011	"Country Thang" (with Colt Ford)	Potsy Ponciroli

== Songs written ==
Artist	Album	Song	Co-written with
Trace Adkins	Songs About Me (2005)	"Honky Tonk Badonkadonk"	Randy Houser, Jamey Johnson
Trace Adkins	Proud to Be Here (2011)	"Always Gonna Be That Way"	Chris Tompkins
Jason Aldean	Old Boots, New Dirt (2014)	"Tonight Looks Good on You"	Rhett Akins, Ashley Gorley
Jason Aldean	They Don't Know (2016)	"Comin' In Hot"	Ashley Gorley Rodney Clawson
Clayton Anderson	Torn Jeans & Tailgates	"Y'all Can Have This Town"	Brian Kolb
Clayton Anderson	Torn Jeans & Tailgates	"Shotgun Rider"	Rhett Akins, Keith Anderson, Ben Hayslip
Keith Anderson	C'mon (2008)	"C'mon"	Keith Andesron
Jessica Andrews	—N/a	"The Clown" (2014)	Hillary Lindsey, James T. Slater
Rodney Atkins	It's America (2009)	"Friends with Tractor"	Rhett Akins, Ben Hayslip
Frankie Ballard	Frankie Ballard (2011)	"A Buncha Girls"	Frankie Ballard, Rhett Akins, Ben Hayslip
Frankie Ballard	Frankie Ballard (2011)	"Place to Lay Your Head"	Rhett Akins, Ben Hayslip
Frankie Ballard	Frankie Ballard (2011)	"Tell Me You Get Lonely"	Marty Dodson
Frankie Ballard	Frankie Ballard (2011)	"Sober Me Up" (also on Sunshine & Whiskey)	Ashley Gorley
Frankie Ballard	Sunshine & Whiskey (2014)	"Tell Me You Get Lonely"	Marty Dodson
Lee Brice	I Don't Dance (2014)	"I Don't Dance"	Lee Brice, Rob Hatch
Catherine Britt	—N/a	"Dirt Cheap"	Luke Bryan, Hillary Lindsey
Brooks & Dunn	Cowboy Town (2007)	"Put a Girl in It"	Rhett Akins, Ben Hayslip
Kix Brooks	New to This Town (2012)	"Bring It One Home"	Kix Brooks, Rhett Akins
Kix Brooks	New to This Town (2012)	"In the Right Place"	Rhett Akins, Ben Hayslip
Luke Bryan	Doin' My Thing (2009)	"Rain is a Good Thing"	Luke Bryan
Luke Bryan	Doin' My Thing (2009)	"Doin' My Thing"	Rhett Akin, Ben Hayslip
Luke Bryan	Tailgates & Tanlines (2011)	"Country Girl (Shake It for Me)"	Luke Bryan
Luke Bryan	Tailgates & Tanlines (2011)	"I Don't Want This Night to End"	Luke Bryan, Rhett Akins, Ben Hayslip
Luke Bryan	Spring Break...Here to Party (2013)	"Suntan City"	Luke Bryan, Rhett Akins, Ben Hayslip
Luke Bryan	Spring Break...Here to Party (2013)	"Sorority Girl"	Luke Bryan, Jim McCormick
Luke Bryan	Crash My Party (2013)	"That's My Kind of Night"	Chris DeStefano, Ashley Gorley
Luke Bryan	Crash My Party (2013)	"We Run This Town"	Ashley Gorley, Kelley Lovelace
Luke Bryan	Crash My Party (2013)	"Play It Again"	Ashley Gorley
Luke Bryan	Crash My Party (2013)	"Dirt Road Diary"	Luke Bryan, Rhett Akins, Ben Hayslip
Luke Bryan	Spring Break...Checkin' Out (2015)	"Checkin' Out"	Luke Bryan, Rhett Akins, Ben Hayslip
Luke Bryan	Spring Break...Checkin' Out (2015)	"You and the Beach"	Luke Bryan, Rhett Akins, Ben Hayslip
Luke Bryan	Kill the Lights (2015)	"Kick the Dust Up"	Chris DeStefano, Ashley Gorley
Luke Bryan	Kill the Lights (2015)	"Huntin', Fishin' and Lovin' Every Day"	Luke Bryan, Rhett Akins, Ben Hayslip
Luke Bryan	Kill the Lights (2015)	"Buddies"	Luke Bryan
Weston Burt	Lucky Sometimes (2013)	"Lucky Sometimes"	Ben Hayslip, Charles Kelley
Chris Cagle	My Life's Been a Country Song (2008)	"Little Sundress"	Rhett Akins
Craig Campbell	Never Regret (2013)	"Keep Them Kisses Comin'"	Ben Hayslip
Sabrina Carpenter	Singular: Act I (2018)	"Diamonds are Forever"	Sabrina Carpenter, Johan Carlsson, Ross Golan
Jason Michael Carroll	Numbers (2011)	"Meet Me in the Barn"	Jason Michael Carroll, Patrick Davis
Billy Currington	Little Bit of Everything (2008)	"That's How Country Boys Roll"	Billy Currington, B. Jones
Billy Currington	Enjoy Yourself (2010)	"All Day Long"	Frankie Ballard, Ben Hayslip
Eric Durrance	—N/a	"Angels Fly Away"	
Ronnie Dunn	Ronnie Dunn (2011)	"Let the Cowboy Rock"	Ronnie Dunn
Tyler Farr	Redneck Crazy (2013)	"Hot Mess"	Rhett Akins, Ben Hayslip
Tyler Farr	Suffer in Peace (2015)	"Criminal"	Rhett Akins, Ben Hayslip
Tyler Farr	Suffer in Peace (2015)	"Poor Boy"	Tyler Farr, Rhett Akins, Ashley Gorley
Tyler Farr	Suffer in Peace (2015)	"Why We Live Here"	Tyler Farr, Houston Phillips
Florida Georgia Line	Anything Goes (2014)	"Smile"	Chris DeStefano, Ashley Gorley
Colt Ford	Every Chance I Get (2011)	"Skirts and Boots" (with Frankie Ballard)	James T. Slater, Jimmy Yeary
Colt Ford	Every Chance I Get (2011)	"Country Thang" (with Eric Church)	Rhett Akins, Ben Hayslip
Colt Ford	Every Chance I Get (2011)	"Overworked & Overpaid" (with Charlie Daniels)	
Kevin Fowler	Chippin' Away (2011)	"Here's to Me and You"	Ben Fowler, Rhett Akins, Ben Hayslip
Brantley Gilbert	Halfway to Heaven (2010)	"Back in the Day"	Brantley Gilbert, Ben Hayslip
Brantley Gilbert	Just as I Am (2014)	"Small Town Throwdown" (featuring Justin Moore & Thomas Rhett)	Brantley Gilbert, Rhett Akins, Ben Hayslip
Josh Gracin		"You Don't Know Her Like I Do"	John Kennedy
Trent Harmon	Single	"Falling"	Keith Urban, Brett James
Hunter Hayes	21 (2015)	"21"	Hunter Hayes, Kelley Lovelace, Ashley Gorley
Randy Houser	Anything Goes (2008)	"Back to God"	Randy Houser
Randy Houser	Anything Goes (2008)	"My Kind of Country"	Randy Houser
Randy Houser	How Country Feels (2013)	"Runnin' Outta Moonlight"	Ashley Gorley, Kelley Lovelace
Randy Houser	How Country Feels (2013)	"Sunshine on the Line"	Randy Houser
Randy Houser	Fired Up (2016)	"Mine Tonight"	Rhett Akins, Ben Hayslip
Randy Houser	Fired Up (2016)	"Lucky Me"	Randy Houser, Craig Wiseman
Randy Houser	Fired Up (2016)	"Fired Up"	Rob Hatch
Randy Houser	Fired Up (2016)	"Gotta Get You Home"	Ashley Gorley, Kelley Lovelace
Randy Houser	Fired Up (2016)	"Same Ole Saturday Night"	Ben Hayslip, Martin Johnson
Houston County	—N/a	"I Can't Make It Rain" (2009)	Ben Hayslip, Adam Hooper, Zack Hooper, John Milldrum
Jack Ingram	Big Dreams & High Hopes (2008)	"Barefoot and Crazy"	Rhett Akins, Ben Hayslip
Casey James	Casey James (2012)	"So Sweet"	Casey James, Patrick Davis
Chris Janson	Take It to the Bank (2014)	"Where My Girls At"	Chris Jansen
Jamey Johnson	The Dollar (2006)	"Flying Silver Eagle"	Jamey Johnson
Jamey Johnson	The Dollar (2006)	"She's All Lady"	Jamey Johnson
Jamey Johnson	The Guitar Song (2010)	"Good Times Ain't What They Used to Be"	Jamey Johnson, Jim McCormack
Jewel	Sweet and Wild (2010)	"Stay Here Forever"	Jewel, Bobby Pinson
Jewel	Picking Up the Pieces (2015)	"The Shape of You"	Jewel, David Lee Murphy
Lady Antebellum	Own the Night (2011)	"We Owned the Night"	Charles Kelley, Dave Haywood
Lady Antebellum	Own the Night (2011)	"Just a Kiss"	Hillary Scott, Charles Kelley, Dave Haywood
Tracy Lawrence		"Footprints on the Moon"	
Aaron Lewis	The Road (2013)	"Granddaddy's Gun"	Rhett Akins, Ben Hayslip, Bobby Pinson
Justin McBride	Don't Let Go (2007)	"Tough"	
Love and Theft	—N/a	"Night That You'll Never Forget" (2014)	Ashley Gorley
Tim McGraw		"Louisiana"	
Tim McGraw	Emotional Traffic (2012)	"Touchdown Jesus"	Rhett Akins, Ben Hayslip
Neal McCoy	XII (2012)	"Real Good Feel Good"	Jimmy Ritchy, Sam Hunt
Neal McCoy	XII (2012)	"Shotgun Rider"	Keith Anderson, Rhett Akins, Ben Hayslip
Montgomery Gentry	Rebels on the Run (2011)	"Where I Come From"	Rodney Clawson
Justin Moore	Justin Moore (2009)	"The Only Place That I Call Home"	Justin Moore, Jeremy Stover
Justin Moore	Outlaws Like Me	"If Heaven Wasn't So Far Away"	Rob Hatch, Brett Jones" (2011)
Craig Morgan	This Ole Boy (2012)	"This Ole Boy"	Rhett Akins, Ben Hayslip
Joe Nichols	Real Things (2007)	"She's All Lady"	Jamey Johnson
Joe Nichols	Old Things New (2009)	"Gimmie That Girl"	Rhett Akins, Ben Hayslip
Joe Nichols	Old Things New (2009)	'The Shape I'm In"	Rhett Akins, Ben Hayslip
Joe Nichols	It's All Good (2011)	"Take It Off"	Ashley Gorley, Kelley Lovelace
Joe Nichols	It's All Good (2011)	"The More I Look"	Rodney Clawson, Jim Beavers
Joe Nichols	It's All Good (2011)	"This Ole Boy"	Rhett Aksin, Ben Hayslip
Joe Nichols	Crickets (2013)	"Smile on Mine"	Rhett Akins, Ben Hayslip
Joe Nichols	Crickets (2013)	"Open Up a Can"	Ashley Gorley, Kelley Lovelace
Jerrod Niemann	Yellow Brick Road (2007)	"I Love Women My Momma Can't Stand"	Rhett Akins
Jerrod Niemann	Judge Jerrod & the Hung Jury (2010)	"They Should Have Named You Cocaine"	Jerrod Niemann, Jamey Johnson
Jake Owen	Easy Does It (2009)	"Nothin' Grows in Shadows"	Rhett Akins, Doug Johnson
Jake Owen	Barefoot Blue Jean Night (2011)	"The One That Got Away"	Jake Owen, Jimmy Ritchy
Jake Owen	Days of Gold (2013)	"Life of the Party"	Chris DeStefano, Ashley Gorley
Jake Owen	Days of Gold (2013)	"Good Timing"	Ashley Gorley, Zach Crowell
Jake Owen	American Love (2016)	"You Ain't Going Nowhere"	Ross Copperman, Ashley Gorley
Brad Paisley	Play (2008)	"Start a Band" (with Keith Urban)	Ashley Gorley, Kelley Lovelace
Rascal Flatts	Changed (2012)	"Hot in Here"	Ashley Gorley, Kelley Lovelace
Ashley Ray	Single	"Dirt Cheap" (featuring Mike Eli)	Luke Bryan, Hillary Lindsey
Chase Rice	Ignite the Night (2014)	"Do It Like This"	Chris DeStefano, Ashley Gorley
The Robertsons	Duck the Halls: A Robertson Family Christmas (2013)	"Ragin' Chajun Redneck Christmas"	Willie Robertson
Darius Rucker	True Believers (20130	"Heartbreak Road"	Darius Rucker, Rhett Akins
Blake Shelton	Startin' Fires (2008)	"Country Strong"	Rhett Akins, Ben Hayslip
Blake Shelton	Startin' Fires (2008)	"Home Sweet Home"	Rhett Akins, Ben Hayslip
Blake Shelton	Hillbilly Bone (2010)	"Kiss My Country Ass"	Rhett Akins, Jon Stone
Blake Shelton	All About Tonight (2010)	"All About Tonight"	Rhett Akins, Ben Hayslip
Blake Shelton	Red River Blue (2011)	"Good Ol' Boys"	
Blake Shelton	Based on a True Story... (2013)	"Boys 'Round Here"	Rhett Akins, Craig Wiseman
Blake Shelton	Based on a True Story... (2013)	"Granddaddy's Gun"	Rhett Akins, Bobby Pinson
Blake Shelton	If I'm Honest (2016)	"One Night Girl"	Ashley Gorley
Ashton Shepherd	Where Country Grows (2011)	"Keepin' It Rural"	Ben Hayslip, Jimmy Yeary
Tate Stevens	Tate Stevens (2013)	"That's How You Get the Girl"	Ben Hayslip, Rivers Rutherford
Josh Thompson	Way Out Here (2010)	"I Won't Go Crazy"	Josh Thompson
Josh Turner	Haywire (2010)	"All Over Me"	Rhett Akins, Ben Hayslip
Andy Velo	Blue Collar Crusie	"Meet Me in the Barn"	Patrick Davis, Jason Michael Carroll
Jared Wade	Drunk on Sunshine (2013)	"Drunk on Sunshine"	Ashley Gorley, Kelley Lovelace
Chad Warrix	Single	"Rain on the Roof"	Rhett Akins, Ben Hayslip
Hank Williams, Jr.	Country Strong: Original Motion Picture Soundtrack (2010)	"Thirsty"	Rhett Akins, Brett Eldredge
Gretchen Wilson	I Got Your Country Right Here (2010)	"Blue Collar Done Turn Red"	Gretchen Wilson
Jon Wolfe	It All Happen at a Honky Tonk (2013)	"Sweet Little Song and Dance"	Rhett Akins, Ben Hayslip
Chris Young	Chris Young (2006)	"I'm Heading Your Way, José"	James T. Slater
