= Ben Hayslip =

American country music songwriter

- Born: March 11, 1970 (age 56); Evans, Georgia, U.S.
- Genres: Country
- Occupation: Songwriter
- Years active: 1994–present
- Member of: The Peach Pickers

Ben Hayslip (born March 11, 1970, in Evans, Georgia) is an American country music songwriter.

== Early life ==
Born in Evans, Georgia, Hayslip’s family moved to Valdosta, GA where he was a freshman quarterback for the 1984 state and national champ Valdosta Wildcats of Valdosta High School in Valdosta, Georgia. Hayslip’s family eventually moved back to Evans, Georgia, in January 1985, where he would become a four-year starter on the Evans Knights baseball team in Evans, Georgia and capture a 1987 State runner-up, a 1988 State Championship. Hayslip participated in the 1988 Georgia North/South All-State game. Hayslip attended Georgia Southern University to play baseball and was a member of the 1990 team that participated in the College World Series in Omaha, Nebraska.

Hayslip interned with WRDW TV 12 in Augusta, Georgia in 1993-1994 while in college.

After graduating from Georgia Southern University in 1994, Hayslip moved to Nashville, Tennessee, to pursue a career in country music.

== Career ==
Hayslip has co-written many hit songs including "Gimmie That Girl" and "The Shape I'm In" by Joe Nichols and "Chicken and Biscuits" by Colt Ford. Hayslip also co-wrote Martina McBride's single "I'm Gonna Love You Through It", Luke Bryan's "I Don't Want This Night to End", and Thomas Rhett's Star of the Show. Hayslip often collaborates with fellow Georgia natives Rhett Akins and Dallas Davidson. The trio of songwriters are known as The Peach Pickers. In April 2010, "Gimme That Girl" went to number one on the country music singles charts, the first Hayslip written song to do so. "All About Tonight", "All Over Me", "Honey Bee", "I Don't Want This Night to End" and "The Only Way I Know" all reached number one on the country music charts along with multiple other songs.

Hayslip won ASCAP Songwriter of the Year in 2011 and 2012. Hayslip has won twenty ASCAP awards and two song of the year Awards for "Honey Bee" and "It Goes Like This."

In 2011, 2013 and 2014 and 2018, Hayslip received the CMA Triple Play Award for having three #1 songs in a twelve-month period. Hayslip was also named ASCAP'S 2011 and 2012 Songwriter of the Year.

In 2009, Hayslip had twenty-nine cuts by various artists.

== Discography ==
Ben Hayslip releases
Year	Artist	Song	Album	Co-written with
—N/a	Troy Olsen	"Summer Thing"		
2004	Jeff Bates	"Long, Slow Kisses"	Leave the Light On	Jeff Bates, Gordan Bradberry
2008	Brooks & Dunn	"Put a Girl in It"	Cowboy Town	Rhett Akins, Dallas Davidson
2008	Trent Willmon	"Broken In"	Broken In	Rhett Akins, Gary Lloyd
2009	Rodney Atkins	"Friends with Tractors"	It's America	Rhett Akins, Dallas Davidson
2009	Rodney Atkins	"Farmer's Daughter"	It's America	Rhett Akins, Marv Green
2009	Luke Bryan	"Doin' My Thing"	Doin' My Thing	Rhett Akins, Dallas Davidson
2009	Jack Ingram	"Barefoot and Crazy"	Big Dreams & High Hopes	Rhett Akins, Dallas Davidson
2009	Joe Nichols	"Gimmie That Girl"	Old Things New	Rhett Akins, Dallas Davidson
2009	Joe Nichols	"The Shape I'm In"	Old Things New	Rhett Akins, Dallas Davidson
2009	Blake Shelton	"I'll Just Hold On"	Startin' Fires	Troy Olsen, Bryant Simpson
2009	Blake Shelton	"Country Strong"	Startin' Fires	Rhett Akins, Dallas Davidson
2009	Blake Shelton	"Home Sweet Home"	Startin' Fires	Rhett Akins, Dallas Davidson
2010	Colt Ford	"Chicken and Biscuits"	Chicken & Biscuits	
2010	Brantley Gilbert	"Kick It In the Sticks"	Halfway to Heaven	Brantley Gilbert, Rhett Akins
2010	Blake Shelton	"Can't Afford to Love You"	Hillbilly Bone	Rhett Akins, Jimmy Yeary
2010	Blake Shelton	"All About Tonight"	All About Tonight	Rhett Akins, Dallas Davidson
2010	Josh Turner	"All Over Me"	Haywire	Rhett Akins, Dallas Davidson
2011	Rodney Atkins	"Growing Up Like That"	Take a Back Road	Rodney Atkins, Tim Hewitt
2011	Rodney Atkins	"Lifelines"	Take a Back Road	Rodney Atkins, Tim Hewitt
2011	Luke Bryan	"I Don't Want This Night to End"	Tailgates & Tanlines	Luke Bryan, Rhett Akins, Dallas Davidson
2011	Martina McBride	"I'm Gonna Love You Through It"	Eleven	Sonya Isaacs, Jimmy Yeary
2011	Jake Owen	"Anywhere with You"	Barefoot Blue Jean Night	David Lee Murphy, Jimmy Yeary
2011	Blake Shelton	"Honey Bee"	Red River Blue	Rhett Akins
2011	Chris Young	"I Can Take It from There"	Neon	Chris Young, Rhett Akins
2012	Jason Aldean	"When She Says Baby"	Night Train	Rhett Akins
2012	Jason Aldean	"The Only Way I Know"	Night Train	Rhett Akins
2012	Colt Ford	"Way to Early"	Declaration of Independence	Colt Ford
2012	Dustin Lynch	"Wild in Your Smile"	Dustin Lynch	Rhett Akins, Marv Green
2012	Tim McGraw	"Touchdown Jesus"	Emotional Traffic	Rhett Akins, Dallas Davidson
2012	Craig Morgan	"This Ole Boy"	This Ole Boy	Rhett Akins, Dallas Davidson
2012	Josh Turner	"Watcha Reckon"	Punching Bag	Josh Turner
2012	Josh Turner	"Left Hand Man"	Punching Bag	Josh Turner
2013	Luke Bryan	"Suntan City"	Spring Break...Here to Party	Luke Bryan, Rhett Akins, Dallas Davidson
2013	Luke Bryan	"Dirt Road Diary"	Crash My Party	Rhett Akins, Dallas Davidson
2013	Craig Campbell	"Keep Them Kisses Comin'"	Never Regret	Dallas Davidson
2013	Scotty McCreery	"Roll Your Window Down"	See You Tonight	Rhett Akins, Dallas Davidson
2013	Justin Moore	"Point at You"	Off the Beaten Path	Ross Copperman, Rhett Akins
2013	Thomas Rhett	"It Goes Like This"	It Goes Like This	Thomas Rhett, Jimmy Robbins
2013	Blake Shelton	"Ten Times Crazier"	Based on a True Story…	Rhett Akins, Marv Green
2013	Blake Shelton	"I Found Someone"	Based on a True Story…	Rhett Akins
2014	Jason Aldean	"Sweet Little Somethin'"	Old Boots, New Dirt	David Lee Murphy, Marv Green
2014	Jason Aldean	"I Took It With Me"	Old Boots, New Dirt	David Lee Murphy
2014	Luke Bryan	"Night One"	Spring Break 6...Like We Ain't Ever	Luke Bryan, Rhett Akins, Ashley Gorley
2014	Brantley Gilbert	"17 Again"	Just as I Am	Brantley Gilbert, Rhett Akins
2014	Brantley Gilbert	"Small Town Throwdown"	Just as I Am	Brantley Gilbert, Rhett Akins, Dallas Davidson
2014	Dustin Lynch	"Mind Reader"	Where It's At	Rhett Akins
2014	Tim McGraw	"Dust"	Sundown Heaven Town	Rhett Akins, Rodney Clawson
2014	Blake Shelton	"I Need My Girl"	Bringing Back the Sunshine	Rhett Akins, Ross Copperman
2015	Reba McEntire	"Going Out Like That"	Love Somebody	Rhett Akins, Jason Sellers
2016	Frankie Ballard	El Río	"Little Bit of Both"	Chris Janson, Craig Wiseman
2016	Blake Shelton	If I'm Honest	"Straight Outta Cold Beer"	Marv Green, Justin Wilson
2016	Blake Shelton	If I'm Honest	"It Ain't Easy"	Rhett Akins, Matt Dragstrem
2017	Blake Shelton	Texoma Shore	"I'll Name the Dogs"	Josh Thompson, Matt Dragstrem
2017	Thomas Rhett	Tangled Up(Deluxe)	Star Of The Show	
2018	Blake Shelton	’’Texoma Shore’’	”I Lived It”	Akins, Dragstram, Gorley

== Personal life ==
He married his wife, Melissa, in 1997. They have three boys(Tarver, Camden, Knox) and live in Lebanon, TN.
