= Body of Work: A Collection of Hits =

Compilation album by Aaron Pritchett
- Released: May 12, 2015
- Recorded: 2002–2014
- Genres: Country; country rock
- Length: 61:00
- Label: Big Star
- Producers: Dean Maher; Carly McKillip; Tom McKillip; Mitch Merrett; Mike Norman; Aaron Pritchett

Aaron Pritchett chronology
In the Driver's Seat (2010)	Body of Work: A Collection of Hits (2015)	The Score (2016)

Singles from Body of Work: A Collection of Hits
- 1. "Suntan City" Released: May 28, 2013; 2. "Boat on the Water" Released: July 15, 2014; 3. "Wake You with a Kiss" Released: February 10, 2015

Body of Work: A Collection of Hits is the first greatest hits album released by Canadian country music singer Aaron Pritchett. It was released by Big Star Recordings on May 12, 2015, and serves as Pritchett's first full-length release on the label. The compilation includes thirteen popular singles from Pritchett's second studio album (Consider This in 2002) through his sixth studio album (In the Driver's Seat in 2010) as well as three exclusive tracks that were all released as singles. Pritchett is credited as a songwriter on nine tracks, including all of the releases from Thankful (2008) and In the Driver's Seat.

== Background ==
In July 2013, following the release of "Suntan City", it was reported that Pritchett was working on his seventh studio album, which was expected to be released that fall. By July 2014, Pritchett had signed to Big Star Recordings. In October 2014, Pritchett told the Gabriola Sounder that he was in process of recording new songs, and that "there is no full album coming out, but we're looking at a "greatest hits" [album]. The title, release date, and track listing for Body of Work were announced in April 2015.

"Suntan City" was previously recorded by American country artist Luke Bryan on his EP of the same name (2012).

== Singles ==
A cover of Luke Bryan's "Suntan City" was released digitally via On Ramp Records on May 16, 2013, and was serviced to Canadian country radio on May 28, 2013, and serves as the record's lead single. The song reached number 18 on the Billboard Canada Country airplay chart. It was re-issued as a digital single on January 28, 2015.

"Boat on the Water" was released July 15, 2014 as Pritchett's first release for Big Star Recordings. It reached a peak of 28 on the Canada Country chart. In October 2014, the song was voted the "most popular song" (at the time) on CMT.ca.

A third single, "Wake You with a Kiss", was released February 10, 2015. It reached 29 on the Canada Country chart.

== Track listing ==
No.	Title	Writer(s)	Original album	Length
1.	"You Can't Say That I Didn't Love You"	Trey Bruce; Craig Wiseman	Consider This	4:10
2.	"Lucky for Me"	Mike Norman; Aaron Pritchett; Mike Steen	Something Goin' On Here	3:09
3.	"My Way"	Deric Ruttan; Tim Taylor	Something Goin' On Here	3:43
4.	"New Frontier"	Darryl Burgess; Tommy Polk	Something Goin' On Here	3:48
5.	"Big Wheel"	Pritchett; Mitch Merrett; Burgess	Big Wheel	4:38
6.	"Hold My Beer"	Pritchett; Merrett; Ruttan	Big Wheel	4:08
7.	"Warm Safe Place"	Marcus Hummon; Brett James	Big Wheel	3:40
8.	"Done You Wrong"	Pritchett; Merrett; Taylor	Big Wheel	4:11
9.	"Let's Get Rowdy"	Pritchett; Merrett; Ruttan	Thankful	4:06
10.	"How Do I Get There"	Pritchett; Merrett; Willie Mack	Thankful	4:56
11.	"Hell Bent for Buffalo"	Pritchett; Ruttan; Sean Patrick McGraw	Thankful	3:17
12.	"Light It Up"	Pritchett; Ruttan	In the Driver's Seat	3:45
13.	"Coming Clean"	Pritchett; Mack; Jessie Sherk	In the Driver's Seat	3:40
14.	"Suntan City"	Rhett Akins; Luke Bryan; Dallas Davidson; Ben Hayslip	Previously unreleased	3:30
15.	"Boat on the Water"	Rodney Clawson; Brett Jones	Previously unreleased	2:40
16.	"Wake You with a Kiss"	Clawson; Jones	Previously unreleased	3:39
Total length:				61:00

== Chart performance ==
=== Singles ===
Year	Single	Peak positions
Year	Single	CAN Country
2013	"Suntan City"	18
2014	"Boat on the Water"	28
2015	"Wake You with a Kiss"	29

== Release history ==
Country	Date	Format	Label	Catalog No.	Ref.
Canada	May 12, 2015	CD	Big Star	5020925	
Canada	May 12, 2015	Digital download	Big Star	—N/a	
United States	May 19, 2015	CD	Big Star	Not listed	
United Kingdom	May 4, 2016	CD	Big Star	Not listed	
