= List of Billboard 200 number-one albums of 2013 =

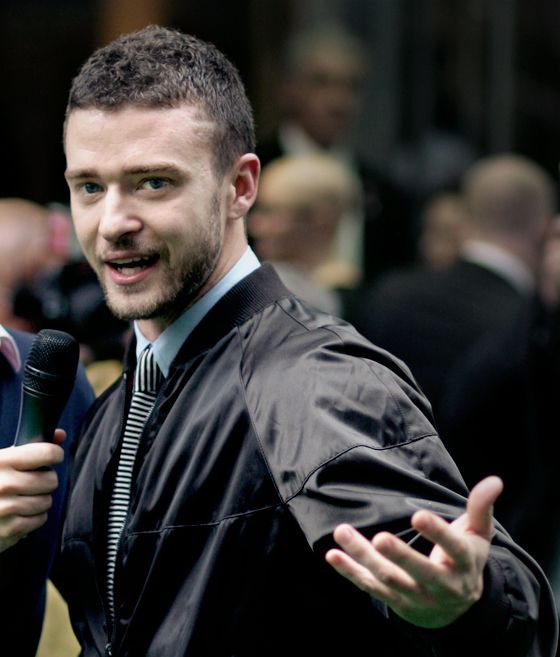
Justin Timberlake earned his second and third US number-one albums with The 20/20 Experience and The 20/20 Experience – 2 of 2, respectively; the former was the year's best selling album.

The highest-selling albums and EPs in the United States are ranked in the Billboard 200, which is published by Billboard magazine. The data are compiled by Nielsen Soundscan based on each album's weekly physical and digital sales. In 2013, a total of 44 albums claimed the top position of the chart. One of which, singer-songwriter Taylor Swift's album Red started its peak in late 2012.

Justin Timberlake's album The 20/20 Experience was the longest-running album of the year, staying atop the chart for three consecutive weeks. Other albums with extended chart runs include Red by Taylor Swift, Babel by Mumford & Sons, Random Access Memories by Daft Punk, Magna Carta Holy Grail by Jay-Z, Crash My Party by Luke Bryan and The Marshall Mathers LP 2 by Eminem; each spent two weeks on the top position. Throughout 2013, only two acts achieved multiple number-one albums on the chart: Justin Timberlake with The 20/20 Experience and The 20/20 Experience – 2 of 2, and Luke Bryan with Spring Break...Here to Party and Crash My Party.

The 20/20 Experience sold 968,000 copies in its first week following its release, becoming the highest-selling album during the debut week. Eminem's The Marshall Mathers LP 2 sold 792,000 copies in its first week, making it the second album with the highest sales during the opening week. Meanwhile, Beyoncé notched her fifth number-one album with her eponymous album; it was also the largest debut sales week for a female artist in 2013, and outselling Knowles' previous albums' debut figures. Knowles is the only female artist in Billboard 200 history to have her first five albums reach number one.

The 20/20 Experience was the biggest-selling album of 2013, with 2,373,000 copies sold in the US.

== Chart history ==
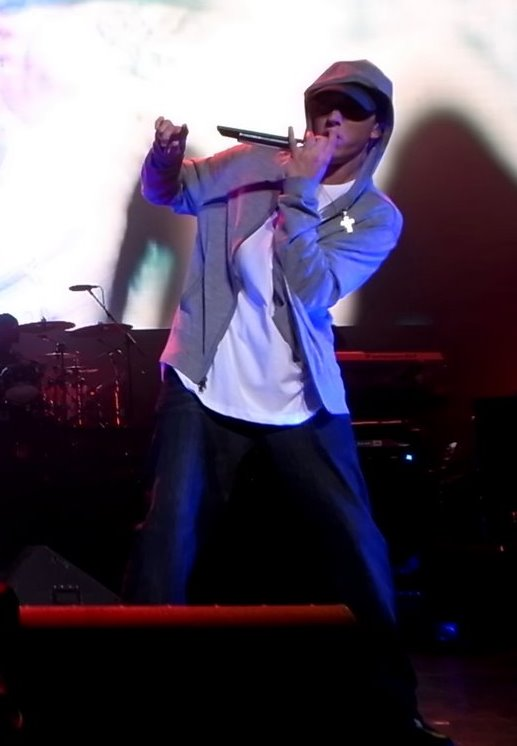
Eminem scored his sixth number-one album on the chart with The Marshall Mathers LP 2, claiming the top spot for two nonconsecutive weeks.

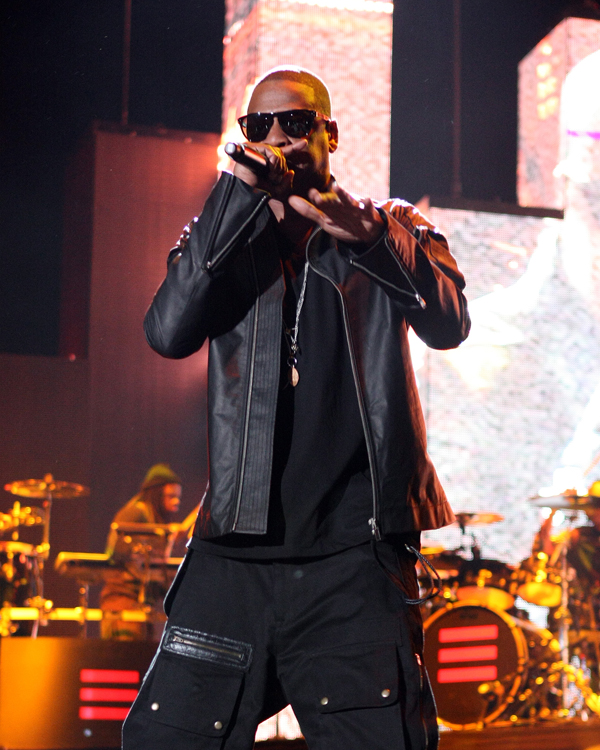
Jay-Z gained his thirteenth US number-one album with Magna Carta Holy Grail, which topped the chart for two consecutive weeks.

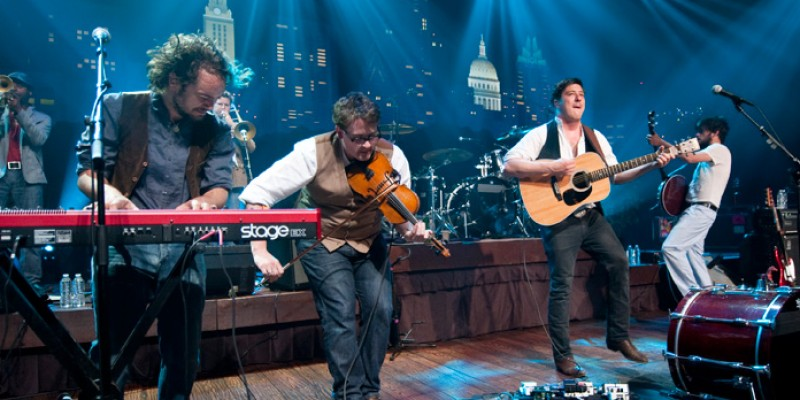
Babel (2011) by Mumford & Sons spent its fourth and fifth weeks atop the chart.

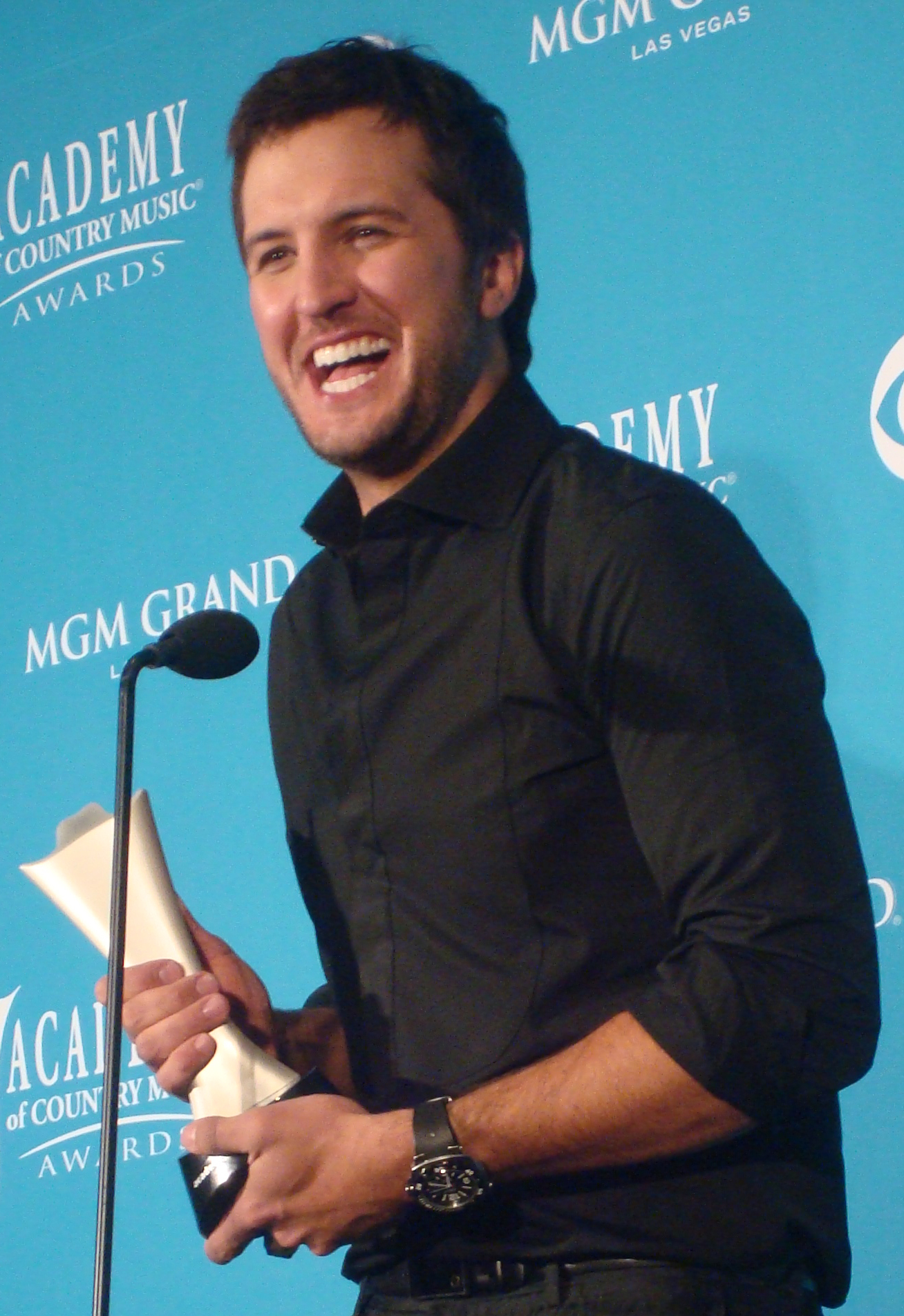
Country musician Luke Bryan topped the chart for three weeks, aided by his albums Spring Break...Here to Party and Crash My Party.

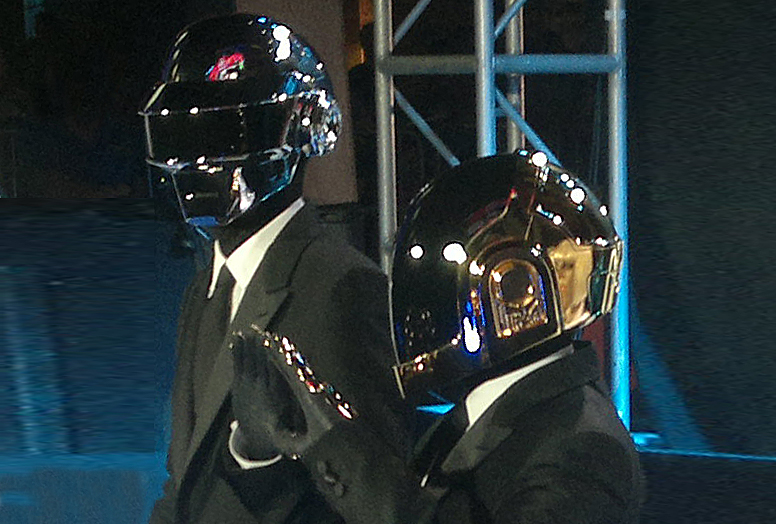
French electronic music duo Daft Punk scored their first US number one album with Random Access Memories, which spent two weeks at the top.

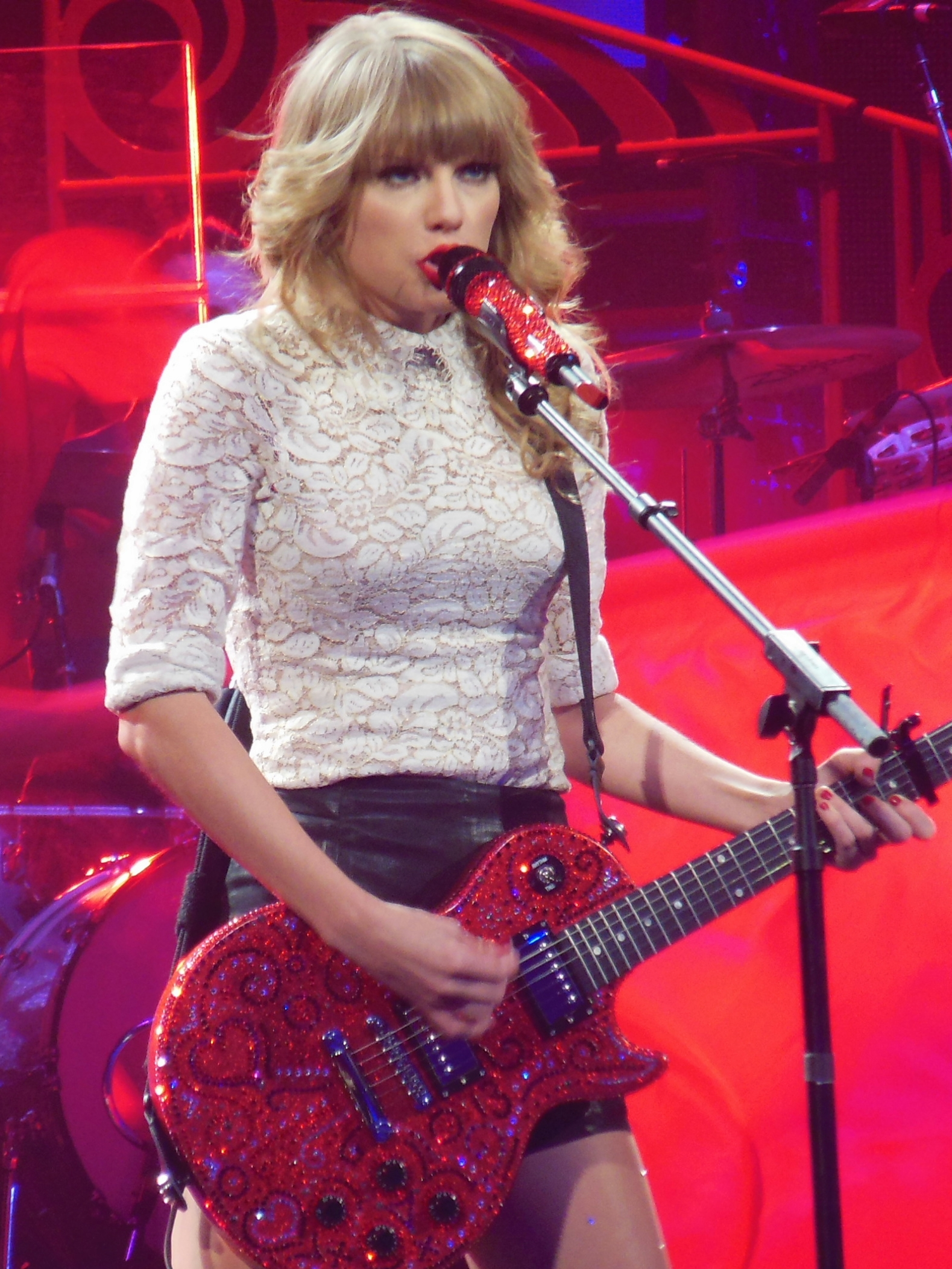
Taylor Swift's 2012 album Red earned its sixth and seventh chart-topping weeks in January 2013.

Key
†	Indicates best performing album of 2013

Issue date	Album	Artist(s)	Sales	Ref.
January 5	Red	Taylor Swift	276,000	
January 12	Red	Taylor Swift	241,000	
January 19	Les Misérables: Highlights from the Motion Picture Soundtrack	Soundtrack	92,000	
January 26	Burning Lights	Chris Tomlin	73,000	
February 2	Long. Live. ASAP	ASAP Rocky	139,000	
February 9	Set You Free	Gary Allan	106,000	
February 16	Believe Acoustic	Justin Bieber	211,000	
February 23	All That Echoes	Josh Groban	145,000	
March 2	Babel	Mumford & Sons	185,000	
March 9	Babel	Mumford & Sons	63,000	
March 16	Unorthodox Jukebox	Bruno Mars	95,000	
March 23	Spring Break...Here to Party	Luke Bryan	150,000	
March 30	What About Now	Bon Jovi	101,000	
April 6	The 20/20 Experience †	Justin Timberlake	968,000	
April 13	The 20/20 Experience †	Justin Timberlake	318,000	
April 20	The 20/20 Experience †	Justin Timberlake	139,000	
April 27	Paramore	Paramore	106,000	
May 4	Save Rock and Roll	Fall Out Boy	154,000	
May 11	To Be Loved	Michael Bublé	195,000	
May 18	Life on a Rock	Kenny Chesney	153,000	
May 25	Golden	Lady Antebellum	167,000	
June 1	Modern Vampires of the City	Vampire Weekend	134,000	
June 8	Random Access Memories	Daft Punk	339,000	
June 15	Random Access Memories	Daft Punk	93,000	
June 22	...Like Clockwork	Queens of the Stone Age	91,000	
June 29	13	Black Sabbath	155,000	
July 6	Yeezus	Kanye West	327,000	
July 13	The Gifted	Wale	158,000	
July 20	Born Sinner	J. Cole	58,000	
July 27	Magna Carta Holy Grail	Jay-Z	528,000	
August 3	Magna Carta Holy Grail	Jay-Z	129,000	
August 10	Stars Dance	Selena Gomez	97,000	
August 17	Blurred Lines	Robin Thicke	177,000	
August 24	The Civil Wars	The Civil Wars	116,000	
August 31	Crash My Party	Luke Bryan	528,000	
September 7	Crash My Party	Luke Bryan	159,000	
September 14	Hail to the King	Avenged Sevenfold	159,000	
September 21	Yours Truly	Ariana Grande	138,000	
September 28	Fuse	Keith Urban	98,000	
October 5	From Here to Now to You	Jack Johnson	117,000	
October 12	Nothing Was the Same	Drake	658,000	
October 19	The 20/20 Experience – 2 of 2	Justin Timberlake	350,000	
October 26	Bangerz	Miley Cyrus	270,000	
November 2	Lightning Bolt	Pearl Jam	166,000	
November 9	Prism	Katy Perry	286,000	
November 16	Reflektor	Arcade Fire	140,000	
November 23	The Marshall Mathers LP 2	Eminem	792,000	
November 30	Artpop	Lady Gaga	258,000	
December 7	The Marshall Mathers LP 2	Eminem	120,000	
December 14	Midnight Memories	One Direction	546,000	
December 21	Blame It All on My Roots: Five Decades of Influences	Garth Brooks	146,000	
December 28	Beyoncé	Beyoncé	617,000	

== See also ==
- 2013 in music
- List of Billboard Hot 100 number-one singles of 2013
- List of Billboard number-one country albums of 2013
