= Worth a Shot =

Worth a Shot may refer to:

- Worth a Shot (Aaron Pritchett song), 2018
- Worth a Shot (Elle King and Dierks Bentley song), 2022
