= Thankful (Aaron Pritchett album) =

Studio album by Aaron Pritchett
- Released: September 9, 2008
- Genre: Country
- Length: 52:27
- Label: 604
- Producer: Dean Maher; Mitch Merrett; Mike Norman; Aaron Pritchett

Aaron Pritchett chronology
Big Wheel (2006)	Thankful (2008)	In the Driver's Seat (2010)

Singles from Thankful
- 1. "Let's Get Rowdy" Released: June 2, 2008; 2. "How Do I Get There" Released: October 14, 2008; 3. "Hell Bent for Buffalo" Released: March 2, 2009; 4. "Hard to Miss" Released: June 15, 2009; 5. "Nothing but Us" Released: February 1, 2010

Thankful is an album by Canadian country music singer Aaron Pritchett. His fifth album, it was released on September 9, 2008 by 604 Records. The album's first three singles charted on the Canadian Hot 100.

== Track listing ==
No.	Title	Writer(s)	Length
1.	"How Do I Get There"	Aaron Pritchett, Mitch Merrett, Willie Mack	4:55
2.	"Hell Bent for Buffalo"	Pritchett, Deric Ruttan, Sean Patrick McGraw	3:16
3.	"Unraveling"	Pritchett, Merrett, Mack	3:59
4.	"September"	Pritchett, Merrett, Darryl Burgess	3:51
5.	"Hard to Miss"	Lynn Hutton, Ryan Tyndell, Jeff Hyde	3:35
6.	"Come Over"	Melissa Ann Pierce, John Paul White	4:17
7.	"Nothing but Us"	Pritchett, Merrett, Mack	4:05
8.	"Undeniable"	Pritchett, Mack	3:28
9.	"Simple"	Pritchett, Merrett, Mack	3:43
10.	"After the Rain"	Pritchett, Merrett, Ruttan	4:58
11.	"Let's Get Rowdy"	Pritchett, Merrett, Ruttan	4:06
12.	"Thankful"	Mack, Brett James	3:36
13.	"I Wonder" (duet with Jessie Farrell)	Pritchett, Carolyn Dawn Johnson	4:38

== Chart performance ==
=== Singles ===
Year	Single	Peak positions
Year	Single	CAN
2008	"Let's Get Rowdy"	98
2008	"How Do I Get There"	79
2009	"Hell Bent for Buffalo"	84
2009	"Hard to Miss"	—
2010	"Nothing but Us"	—
"—" denotes releases that did not chart
