= Better When I Do =

2018 single by Aaron Pritchett

Single by Aaron Pritchett

from the EP Out on the Town
- Released: November 23, 2018
- Genre: Country
- Length: 3:06
- Label: Big Star
- Songwriters: Jessi Alexander; Corey Crowder; Jimmy Yeary
- Producer: Scott Cooke

Aaron Pritchett singles chronology
"Worth a Shot" (2018)	"Better When I Do" (2018)	"Good Thing" (2019)

Music video
- "Better When I Do" on YouTube

"Better When I Do" is a song recorded by Canadian country artist Aaron Pritchett. The track was produced by Scott Cooke, and co-written by Jessi Alexander, Corey Crowder, and Jimmy Yeary. It won "Single of the Year" at the 2019 British Columbia Country Music Awards, and was the second single off Pritchett's extended play Out on the Town.

== Background ==
Pritchett was at a publishing house in Nashville, Tennessee, where he heard approximately 60 songs in 45 minutes — including the future number one "Dive Bar" — and he said "not a thing hit". Upon hearing "Better When I Do", which had been written over six years prior and held then passed on by several artists, Pritchett felt an instant connection and knew he had to record it. He stated he "[tends] to favour a bit more edge and some of those pop tinges".

== Commercial performance ==
"Better When I Do" reached a peak of #1 on the Billboard Canada Country chart dated April 6, 2019, marking Pritchett's first chart-topper, 19 years after his debut radio single.

== Accolades ==
Year	Award	Category	Result	Ref
2019	British Columbia Country Music Association	Single of the Year	Won	

== Music video ==
The official music video for "Better When I Do" premiered on November 21, 2018.

== Charts ==
Chart (2019)	Peak position
Canada Country (Billboard)	1
