= Buzzkill (song) =

Promotional single by Luke Bryan

from the album Spring Break...Here to Party
- Released: March 5, 2013
- Recorded: 2013
- Genre: Country
- Length: 3:37
- Label: Capitol Nashville
- Songwriters: Luke Bryan; Jason Sever; Rachel Thibodeau
- Producer: Jeff Stevens

"Buzzkill" is a song co-written and recorded by American country artist Luke Bryan for his compilation album, Spring Break...Here to Party (2013). It is one of two new songs featured on the compilation, along with "Just a Sip", the rest of the album being composed of songs from Bryan's four spring break-themed EPs. Despite not being officially promoted as a single, "Buzzkill" debuted at number 5 on the US Country Digital Songs chart and a music video was filmed for the song. It was later serviced to country radio.

== Content ==
"Buzzkill" is a mid-tempo country ballad about an ex who the narrator has not gotten over yet, and how seeing this person acts as a "buzzkill" and brings him down.

== Chart performance ==
Chart (2013)	Peak position
Canada Hot 100 (Billboard)	63
US Billboard Hot 100	74
US Hot Country Songs (Billboard)	20
US Country Airplay (Billboard)	59

== Certifications ==
Region	Certification	Certified units/sales
United States (RIAA)	Gold	500,000^{‡}
^{‡} Sales+streaming figures based on certification alone.
