= List of Billboard number-one country songs of 2013 =

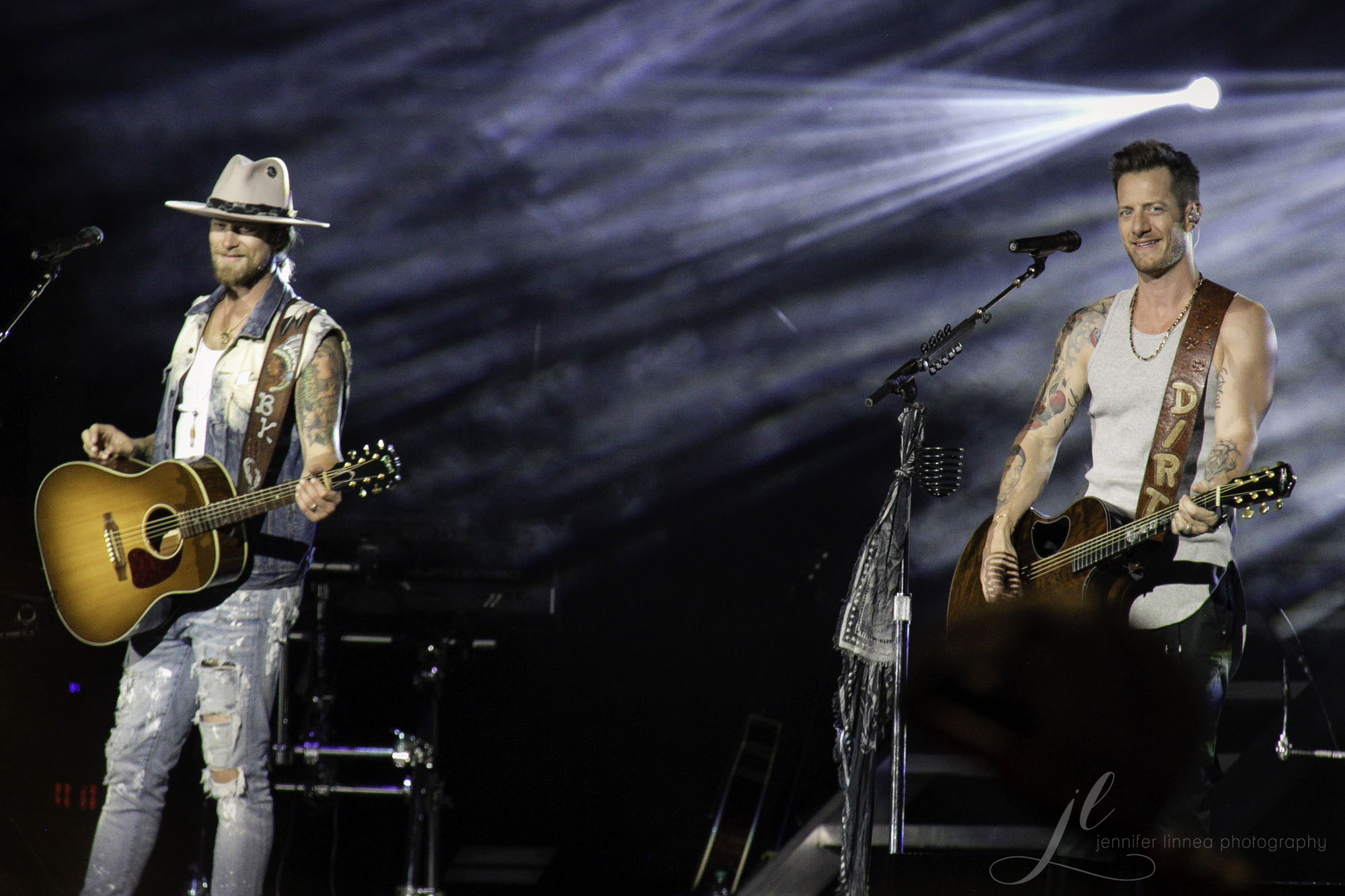
Florida Georgia Line's song "Cruise" spent a record-breaking 24 weeks at number one on the Hot Country Songs chart.

Hot Country Songs and Country Airplay are charts that rank the top-performing country music songs in the United States, published by Billboard magazine. Hot Country Songs ranks songs based on digital downloads, streaming, and airplay not only from country stations but from stations of all formats, a methodology introduced in 2012. Country Airplay, which was published for the first time in 2012, is based solely on country radio airplay, a methodology which had previously been used for several decades for Hot Country Songs. In 2013, 10 different songs topped the Hot Country Songs chart and 31 different songs topped Country Airplay in 52 issues of the magazine

At the start of the year, the number one song on the Hot Country Songs listing was "Cruise" by the duo Florida Georgia Line. After falling from the top spot at the end of January, the song rebounded to the top in April, beginning a run of 19 consecutive weeks at number one. Its final total was 24 weeks at the top of the chart, breaking the record which had stood since the 1940s for the most cumulative weeks spent atop one of Billboard's country song charts. This revival of the song's fortunes was due to the late spring release of a remix featuring rapper Nelly, which proved extremely popular on pop music radio. Thanks to the incorporation into the chart's methodology of airplay data from all radio formats, this support from top 40 radio allowed "Cruise" to hold the top spot throughout the summer. The remix did not prove as popular on country radio, however, and by the late summer, the song was in the unusual position of topping the Hot Country Songs chart but receiving so few plays on country stations that it did not appear in the 60-position airplay listing at all.

"Cruise" was followed into the top spot on the Hot Country Songs chart by "That's My Kind of Night" by Luke Bryan, which spent 12 weeks at number one. Both acts were associated with bro-country, an emerging subgenre which incorporated elements from hip hop music and emphasized lyrics about partying, drinking, and attractive young women. The dominance of the two songs on Hot Country Songs contributed to most of the chart-toppers on the Country Airplay chart not reaching the top of the other listing. Of the 31 songs which topped the airplay chart during 2013, only five also topped Hot Country Songs, and on only four occasions during the year was the same song at number one on both charts. Four acts who topped the airplay listing during the year achieved the first number ones of their careers. In February Randy Houser gained his first number one with "How Country Feels". Pistol Annies, a supergroup composed of female singers Miranda Lambert, Ashley Monroe, and Angaleena Presley, reached number one for the first time in June when they were featured on the song "Boys 'Round Here" by Blake Shelton, Lambert's then-husband. Brett Eldredge was a first-time chart-topper when "Don't Ya" spent two weeks in the top spot at the end of August. Finally, the band Parmalee reached number one for the first time when "Carolina" topped the chart in the issue of Billboard dated December 21. Gary Allan scored his first number one in more than eight years when "Every Storm (Runs Out of Rain)" topped both the Hot Country Songs and Country Airplay charts in February.

== Chart history ==
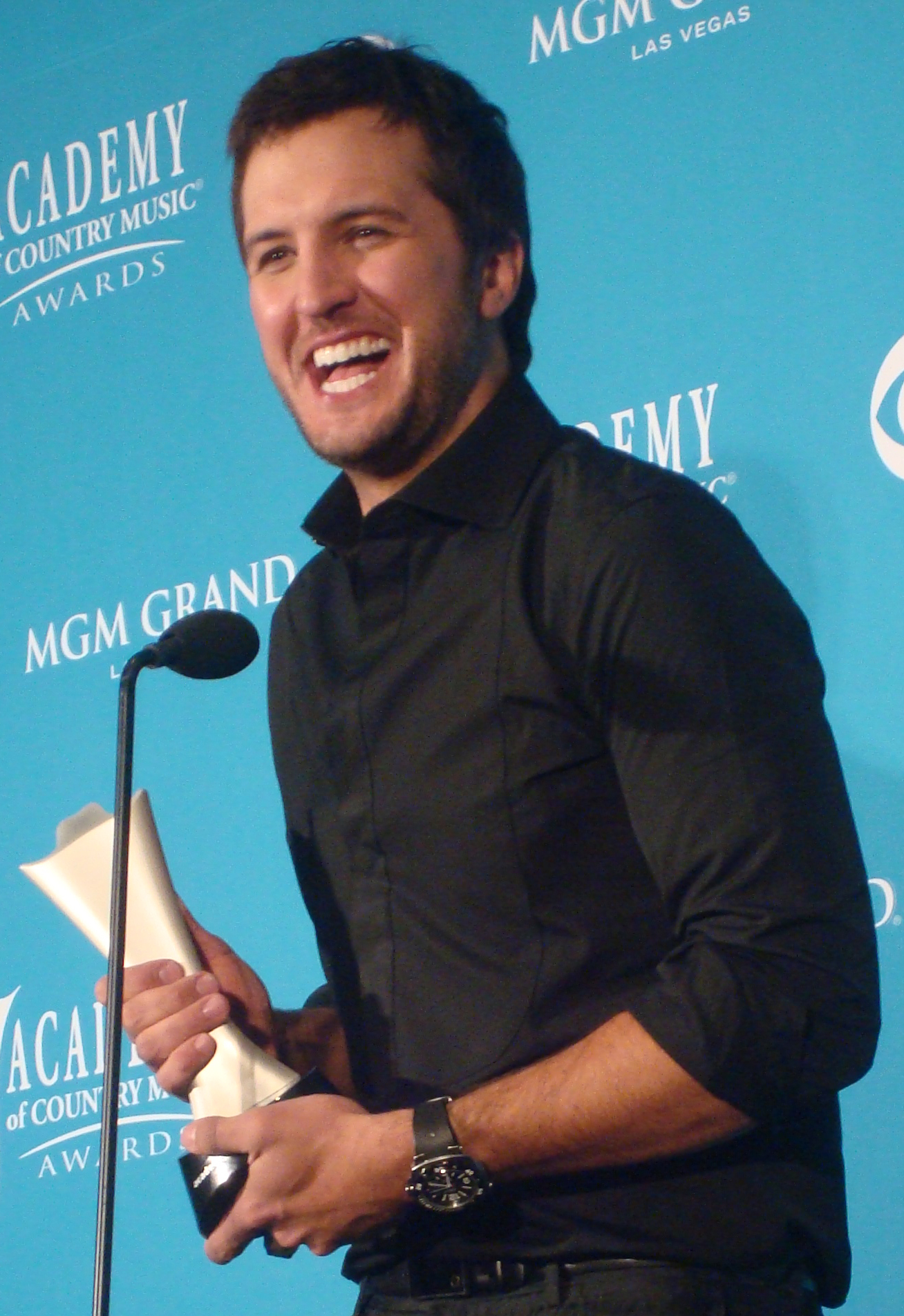
Luke Bryan spent twelve weeks at number one on Hot Country Songs with "That's My Kind of Night".

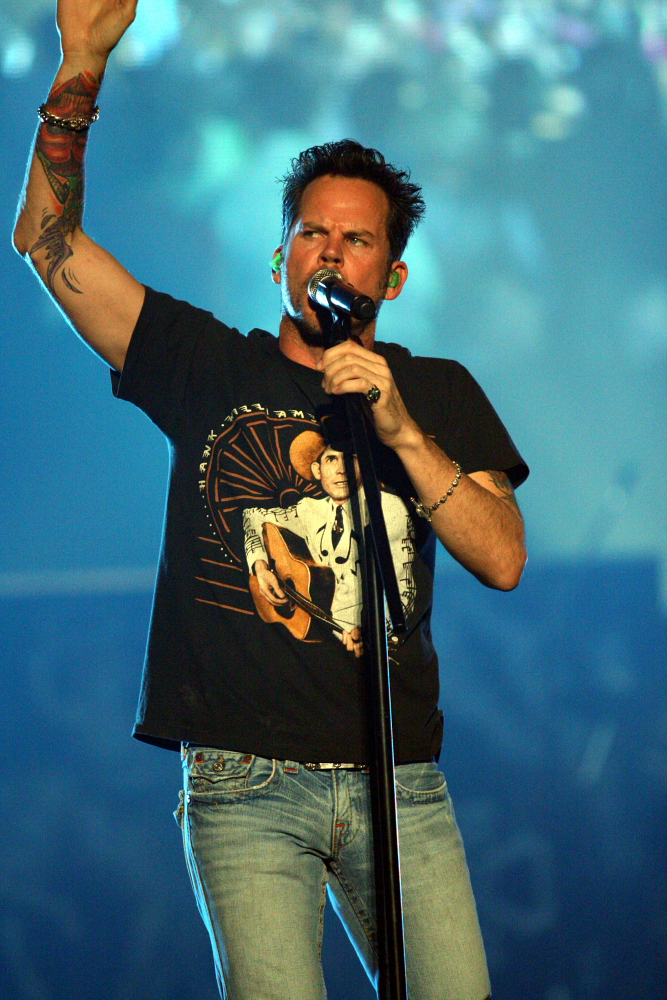
Gary Allan gained his first number one for more than eight years with "Every Storm (Runs Out of Rain)".

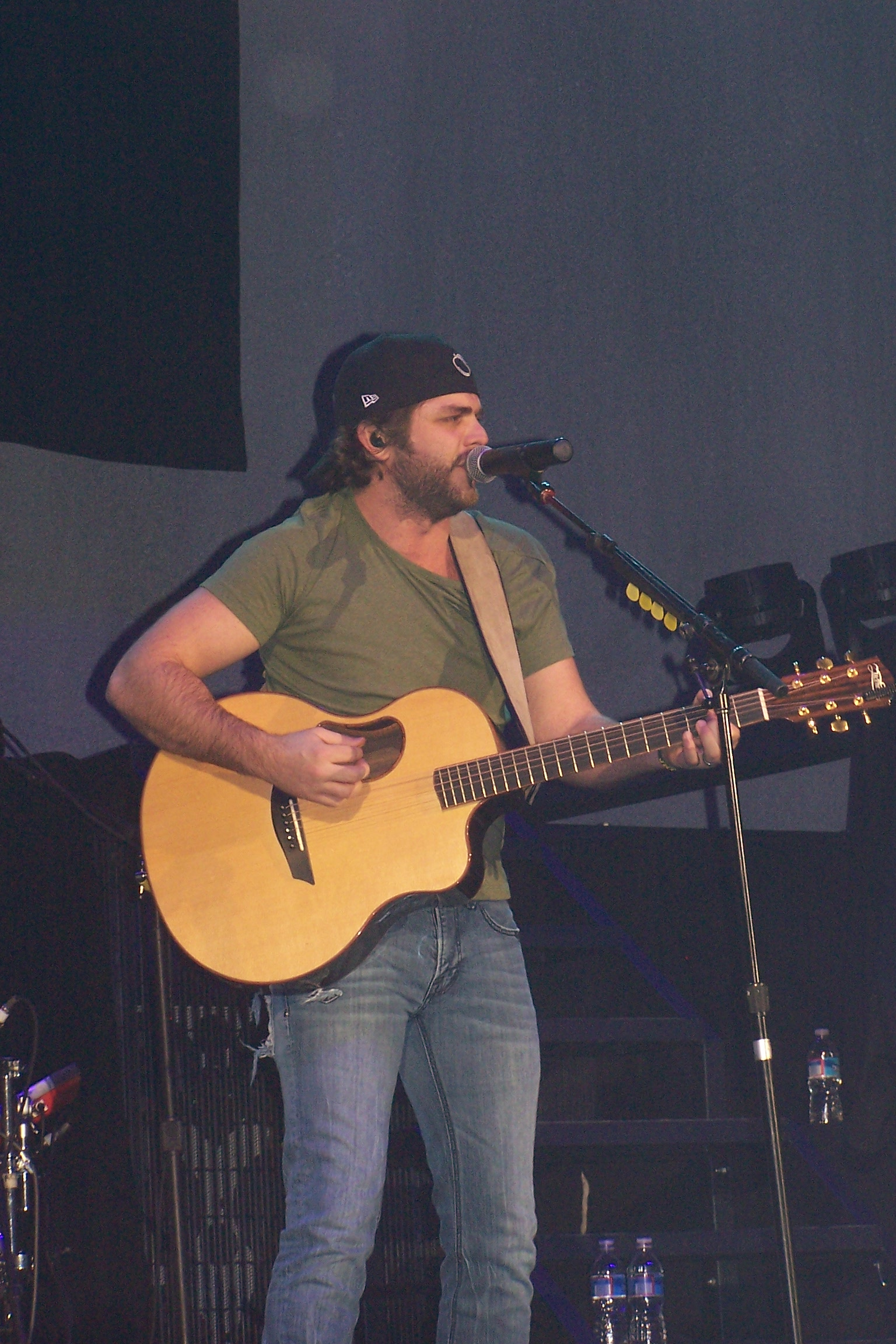
Thomas Rhett achieved his first number one with "It Goes Like This".

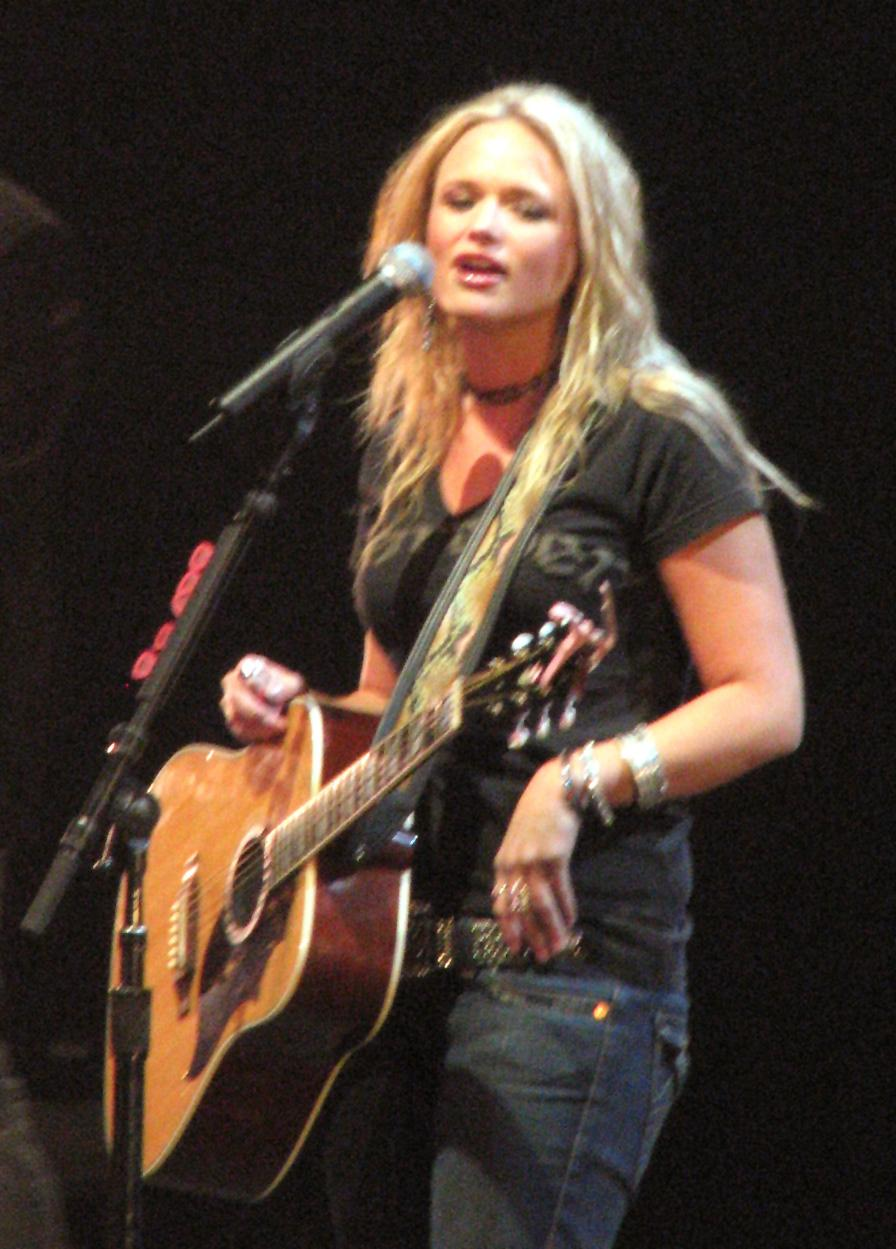
Miranda Lambert collaborated with Keith Urban on the number one "We Were Us". She is also a member of the group Pistol Annies, who performed with Blake Shelton on the chart-topper "Boys 'Round Here".

Chart history
| Issue date | Hot Country Songs | | | Country Airplay | | |
| Issue date | Title | Artist(s) | Ref. | Title | Artist(s) | Ref. |
|---|---|---|---|---|---|---|
| January 5 | "Cruise" | Florida Georgia Line | | "Til My Last Day" | Justin Moore | |
| January 12 | "We Are Never Ever Getting Back Together" | Taylor Swift | | "Goodbye in Her Eyes" | Zac Brown Band | |
| January 19 | "Cruise" | Florida Georgia Line | | "Goodbye in Her Eyes" | Zac Brown Band | |
| January 26 | "Cruise" | Florida Georgia Line | | "Goodbye in Her Eyes" | Zac Brown Band | |
| February 2 | "Better Dig Two" | The Band Perry | | "How Country Feels" | Randy Houser | |
| February 9 | "Every Storm (Runs Out of Rain)" | Gary Allan | | "Every Storm (Runs Out of Rain)" | Gary Allan | |
| February 16 | "Better Dig Two" | The Band Perry | | "The Only Way I Know" | Jason Aldean with Luke Bryan and Eric Church | |
| February 23 | "Wanted" | Hunter Hayes | | "Better Dig Two" | The Band Perry | |
| March 2 | "Wanted" | Hunter Hayes | | "Better Dig Two" | The Band Perry | |
| March 9 | "Sure Be Cool If You Did" | Blake Shelton | | "One of Those Nights" | Tim McGraw | |
| March 16 | "Sure Be Cool If You Did" | Blake Shelton | | "One of Those Nights" | Tim McGraw | |
| March 23 | "Sure Be Cool If You Did" | Blake Shelton | | "One of Those Nights" | Tim McGraw | |
| March 30 | "Sure Be Cool If You Did" | Blake Shelton | | "Sure Be Cool If You Did" | Blake Shelton | |
| April 6 | "Sure Be Cool If You Did" | Blake Shelton | | "Sure Be Cool If You Did" | Blake Shelton | |
| April 13 | "Wagon Wheel" | Darius Rucker | | "Somebody's Heartbreak" | Hunter Hayes | |
| April 20 | "Cruise" | Florida Georgia Line | | "I Drive Your Truck" | Lee Brice | |
| April 27 | "Cruise" | Florida Georgia Line | | "Downtown" | Lady Antebellum | |
| May 4 | "Cruise" | Florida Georgia Line | | "Downtown" | Lady Antebellum | |
| May 11 | "Cruise" | Florida Georgia Line | | "If I Didn't Have You" | Thompson Square | |
| May 18 | "Cruise" | Florida Georgia Line | | "Get Your Shine On" | Florida Georgia Line | |
| May 25 | "Cruise" | Florida Georgia Line | | "Get Your Shine On" | Florida Georgia Line | |
| June 1 | "Cruise" | Florida Georgia Line | | "Wagon Wheel" | Darius Rucker | |
| June 8 | "Cruise" | Florida Georgia Line | | "Wagon Wheel" | Darius Rucker | |
| June 15 | "Cruise" | Florida Georgia Line | | "Highway Don't Care" | Tim McGraw with Taylor Swift | |
| June 22 | "Cruise" | Florida Georgia Line | | "Highway Don't Care" | Tim McGraw with Taylor Swift | |
| June 29 | "Cruise" | Florida Georgia Line | | "Boys 'Round Here" | Blake Shelton featuring Pistol Annies and friends | |
| July 6 | "Cruise" | Florida Georgia Line | | "Anywhere with You" | Jake Owen | |
| July 13 | "Cruise" | Florida Georgia Line | | "Crash My Party" | Luke Bryan | |
| July 20 | "Cruise" | Florida Georgia Line | | "Crash My Party" | Luke Bryan | |
| July 27 | "Cruise" | Florida Georgia Line | | "Crash My Party" | Luke Bryan | |
| August 3 | "Cruise" | Florida Georgia Line | | "Done" | The Band Perry | |
| August 10 | "Cruise" | Florida Georgia Line | | "Runnin' Outta Moonlight" | Randy Houser | |
| August 17 | "Cruise" | Florida Georgia Line | | "Runnin' Outta Moonlight" | Randy Houser | |
| August 24 | "Cruise" | Florida Georgia Line | | "Don't Ya" | Brett Eldredge | |
| August 31 | "That's My Kind of Night" | Luke Bryan | | "Don't Ya" | Brett Eldredge | |
| September 7 | "That's My Kind of Night" | Luke Bryan | | "Little Bit of Everything" | Keith Urban | |
| September 14 | "That's My Kind of Night" | Luke Bryan | | "Little Bit of Everything" | Keith Urban | |
| September 21 | "That's My Kind of Night" | Luke Bryan | | "Round Here" | Florida Georgia Line | |
| September 28 | "That's My Kind of Night" | Luke Bryan | | "Round Here" | Florida Georgia Line | |
| October 5 | "That's My Kind of Night" | Luke Bryan | | "Night Train" | Jason Aldean | |
| October 12 | "That's My Kind of Night" | Luke Bryan | | "Night Train" | Jason Aldean | |
| October 19 | "That's My Kind of Night" | Luke Bryan | | "Hey Girl" | Billy Currington | |
| October 26 | "That's My Kind of Night" | Luke Bryan | | "It Goes Like This" | Thomas Rhett | |
| November 2 | "That's My Kind of Night" | Luke Bryan | | "It Goes Like This" | Thomas Rhett | |
| November 9 | "That's My Kind of Night" | Luke Bryan | | "It Goes Like This" | Thomas Rhett | |
| November 16 | "That's My Kind of Night" | Luke Bryan | | "Mine Would Be You" | Blake Shelton | |
| November 23 | "We Were Us" | Keith Urban and Miranda Lambert | | "Mine Would Be You" | Blake Shelton | |
| November 30 | "We Were Us" | Keith Urban and Miranda Lambert | | "Mine Would Be You" | Blake Shelton | |
| December 7 | "We Were Us" | Keith Urban and Miranda Lambert | | "We Were Us" | Keith Urban and Miranda Lambert | |
| December 14 | "Stay" | Florida Georgia Line | | "Sunny and 75" | Joe Nichols | |
| December 21 | "Stay" | Florida Georgia Line | | "Carolina" | Parmalee | |
| December 28 | "Stay" | Florida Georgia Line | | "Drunk Last Night" | Eli Young Band | |

== See also ==
- 2013 in country music
- List of artists who reached number one on the U.S. country chart
- List of Top Country Albums number ones of 2013
- List of number-one country singles of 2013 (Canada)
