= Sunny and 75 =

Single by Joe Nichols

from the album Crickets
- Released: May 13, 2013
- Recorded: 2013
- Genre: Country
- Length: 3:27
- Label: Red Bow
- Songwriters: Michael Dulaney; Jason Sellers; Paul Jenkins
- Producers: Mickey Jack Cones; Derek George

Joe Nichols singles chronology
"Take It Off" (2011)	"Sunny and 75" (2013)	"Yeah" (2014)

"Sunny and 75" is a song written by Michael Dulaney, Jason Sellers, and Paul Jenkins and recorded by American country music artist Joe Nichols. It was released in May 2013 as his first single for Red Bow Records, and is featured on his eighth studio album Crickets (2013). The song is about the narrator wanting to make a romantic moment with his lover by going to a mood-specific location. It received positive reviews from music critics.

"Sunny and 75" gave Nichols his fourth number-one country hit on the Billboard Country Airplay chart and his first top 10 hit on the Hot Country Songs chart at number 4. It also charted at number 39 on the Hot 100, his fifth top 40 hit on that chart. The song was certified Platinum by the Recording Industry Association of America (RIAA), and has sold 529,000 copies in the United States as of January 2014. It achieved similar chart success in Canada, giving Nichols his first number-one hit on the Country chart and reaching number 49 on the Canadian Hot 100.

The accompanying music video for the song was directed by Brian Lazzaro and has Nichols hanging out on the beach with his love interest.

== Content ==
The song is an uptempo song in which the male narrator expresses a desire to be "somewhere sunny and 75" with his lover. The song is in the key of C major with a chord pattern of F_{sus}2-A_{m}7-G-C/E.

== Critical reception ==
Billy Dukes of Taste of Country gave the song three and a half stars out of five, writing that "the story and emotions don’t quite sink into one’s heart the way a great love song will, but the chorus is a bit of an earworm — one you won’t mind welcoming again and again." Matt Bjorke of Roughstock gave the song four out of five, saying that "it's a well-written and executed song that's exactly what radio and fans want in the spring of 2013 and should be enough to get fans excited for new Joe Nichols music."

== Music video ==
A lyric video premiered on Nichols' Vevo channel on April 23, 2013. The official music video was directed by Brian Lazzaro and premiered in September 2013. The video begins with Nichols on a rooftop with his guitar and finding postcards showing the beach inside his guitar case. He then takes his girlfriend to a beach and they have fun, playing volleyball and rolling around in the sand.

== Chart performance ==
"Sunny and 75" debuted at number 60 on the Billboard Country Airplay chart for the week of May 11, 2013. It also debuted at number 46 on the Billboard Hot Country Songs chart for the week of June 29. On the Billboard Hot 100, it debuted at number 98 on the week of September 14. Thirteen weeks later, it peaked at number 39 the week of December 14, staying on the chart for twenty weeks. "Sunny and 75" became Joe Nichols' fourth number-one country hit on the Country Airplay chart, and his first number one since "Gimmie That Girl" in May 2010. It had sold 529,000 copies in the US as of January 2014.

In Canada, the track debuted at number 98 on the Canadian Hot 100 for the week of October 19, 2013. Nine weeks later, it peaked at number 49 the week of December 21, and remained on the chart for fifteen weeks.

Chart (2013–2014)	Peak position
Canada Hot 100 (Billboard)	49
Canada Country (Billboard)	1
US Billboard Hot 100	39
US Country Airplay (Billboard)	1
US Hot Country Songs (Billboard)	4

=== Year-end charts ===
Chart (2013)	Position
US Country Airplay (Billboard)	38
US Hot Country Songs (Billboard)	51

Chart (2014)	Position
US Country Airplay (Billboard)	92

== Certifications and sales ==
Region	Certification	Certified units/sales
United States (RIAA)	Platinum	529,000

== See also ==
- List of number-one country singles of 2013 (Canada)
- List of number-one country singles of 2013 (U.S.)
