= Dirt Road in 'Em =

2016 single by Aaron Pritchett

"Dirt Road In 'Em"

Single by Aaron Pritchett

from the album The Score
- Released: March 4, 2016
- Genre: Country
- Length: 3:27
- Label: Big Star
- Songwriter(s): Troy Johnson, Justin Sherman, and Jack Williams

Aaron Pritchett singles chronology
"Wake You with a Kiss" (2015)	"Dirt Road In 'Em" (2016)	"Out of the Blue" (2016)

Music video
- "Dirt Road In 'Em" on YouTube

"Dirt Road In 'Em" is a song recorded by Canadian country artist Aaron Pritchett. The track was written by Troy Johnson, Justin Sherman, and Jack Williams. It was the lead single off Pritchett's seventh studio album The Score. The song won "Single of the Year" at the 2016 British Columbia Country Music Awards.

== Background ==
Pritchett was raised in Kitimat, British Columbia. He remarked that the song gave him "that feeling of being on back roads, hanging out with friends and really doing nothing much of anything, just enjoying life".

== Accolades ==
Year	Award	Category	Result	Ref
2016	British Columbia Country Music Association	Single of the Year	Won	
2016	British Columbia Country Music Association	Video of the Year	Won	

== Commercial performance ==
"Dirt Road In 'Em" reached a peak of number six on the Billboard Canada Country chart dated June 18, 2016, spending 20 weeks on the chart in total. It was Pritchett's first top ten hit in seven years since his song "Hell Bent for Buffalo" in 2009. The song has been certified Gold by Music Canada.

== Music video ==
The official music video for "Dirt Road In 'Em" premiered on April 29, 2016. It won "Video of the Year" at the 2016 British Columbia Country Music Awards.

== Charts ==
Chart (2016)	Peak position
Canada Country (Billboard)	6

== Certifications ==
Region	Certification	Certified units/sales
Canada (Music Canada)	Gold	40,000^{‡}
^{‡} Sales+streaming figures based on certification alone.
