= List of Top Country Albums number ones of 2013 =

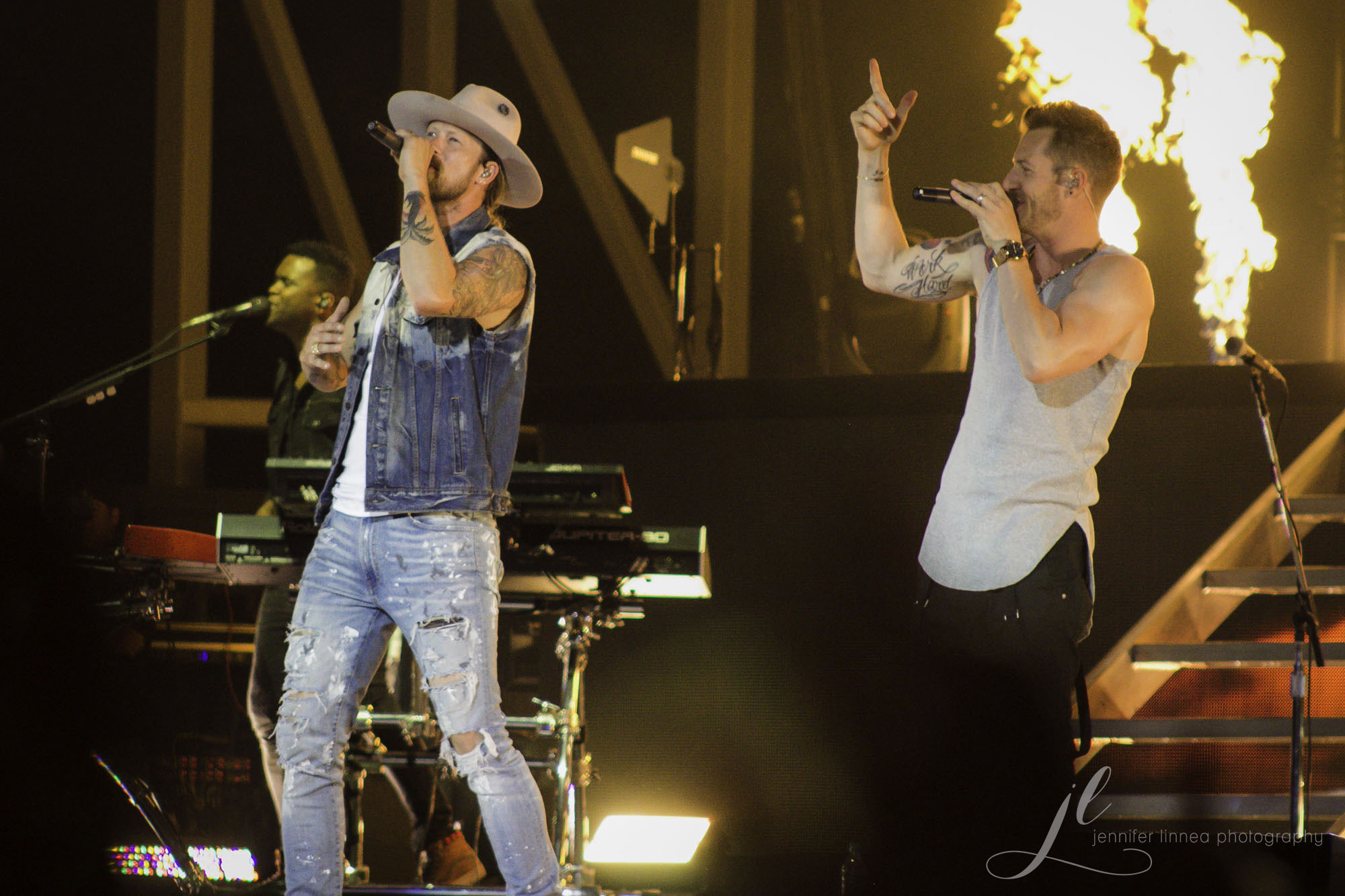
Here's to the Good Times, the debut album by Florida Georgia Line, spent eight weeks at number one.

Top Country Albums is a chart that ranks the top-performing country music albums in the United States, published by Billboard. In 2013, 21 different albums topped the chart; placings were based on electronic point of sale data from retail outlets.

In the issue of Billboard dated January 5, Taylor Swift was at number one with Red, the album's ninth week at number one. The album spent eight weeks in the top spot in 2013, but would prove to be Swift's last entry on the Top Country Albums chart, as she moved away from the country music genre with her subsequent releases. With eight weeks atop the chart, Red tied with Here's to the Good Times, the debut album by Florida Georgia Line, for the most time spent at number one in 2013 by an album. Luke Bryan, the only artist with more than one number one in 2013, had the highest total number of weeks at number one by an artist during the year: he spent two weeks in the peak position with Spring Break…Here to Party and seven with Crash My Party. Both Bryan and Florida Georgia Line were associated with the so-called bro-country style, an emerging sub-genre which incorporated influences from rock music and hip hop and often featured lyrics relating to partying, attractive young women, and pick-up trucks.

In addition to Florida Georgia Line, several other acts reached number one for the first time in 2013. In April, Kacey Musgraves and The Band Perry both gained their first chart-toppers with Same Trailer Different Park and Pioneer respectively, and Hunter Hayes achieved the same feat in July with his eponymous album. Hayes's album reached the top spot in its 89th week on the chart, the longest time taken for an album to reach number one since Billboard began using electronic sales data in 1991. Cassadee Pope, the winner of the third season of TV singing contest The Voice late the previous year, gained her first number one album in October with Frame by Frame. In December, the Robertson family from the TV show Duck Dynasty topped the chart with their debut album Duck the Halls: A Robertson Family Christmas. It was displaced in the issue of Billboard dated December 14 by the compilation album Blame It All on My Roots: Five Decades of Influences by Garth Brooks, which entered the chart at number one. Brooks's compilation was one of several of 2013's Top Country Albums number ones to also top the all-genre Billboard 200 chart, along with albums by Taylor Swift, Gary Allan, Luke Bryan, Kenny Chesney, Lady Antebellum and Keith Urban.

== Chart history ==
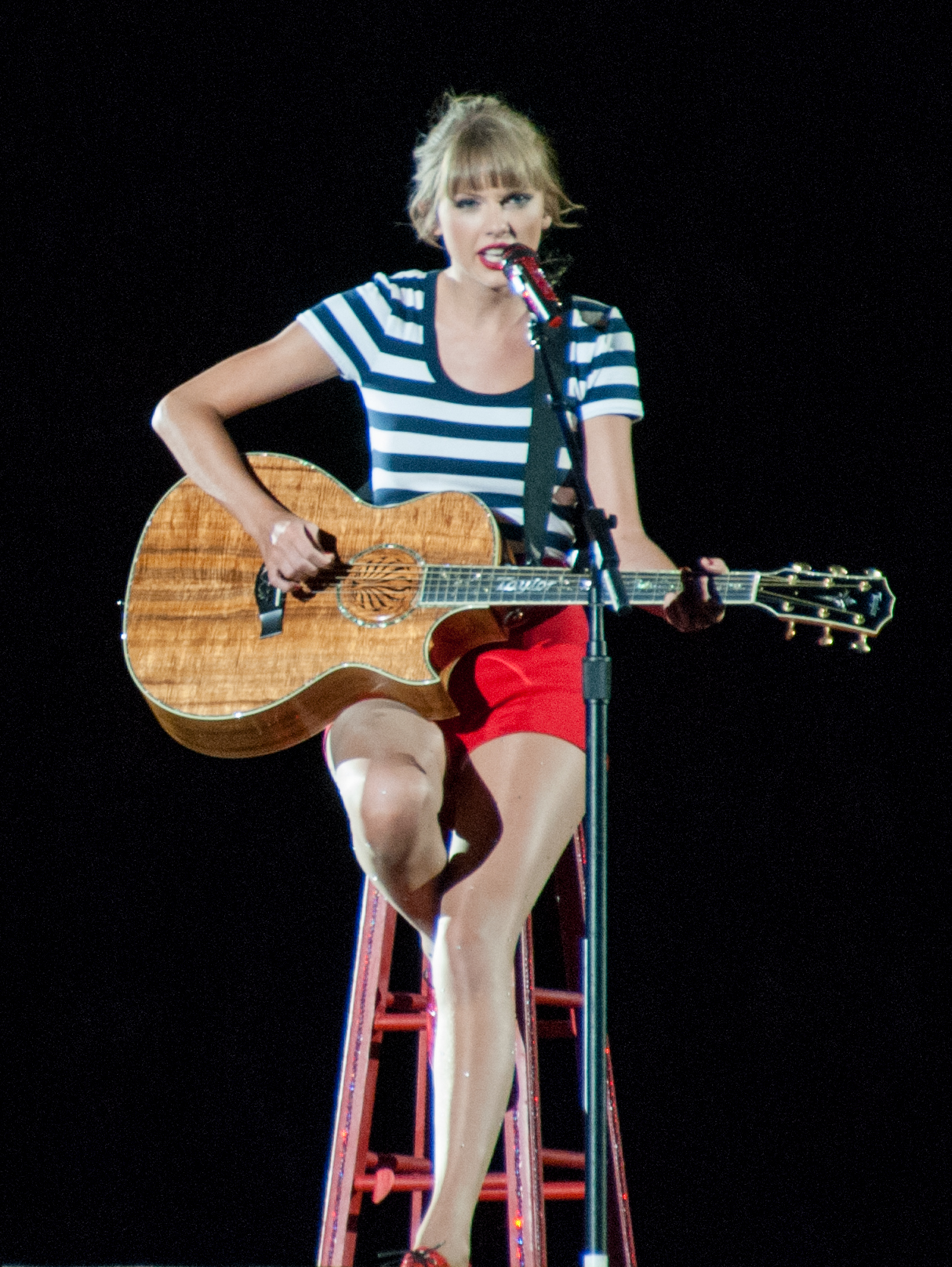
Taylor Swift spent eight weeks at number one with the album Red.

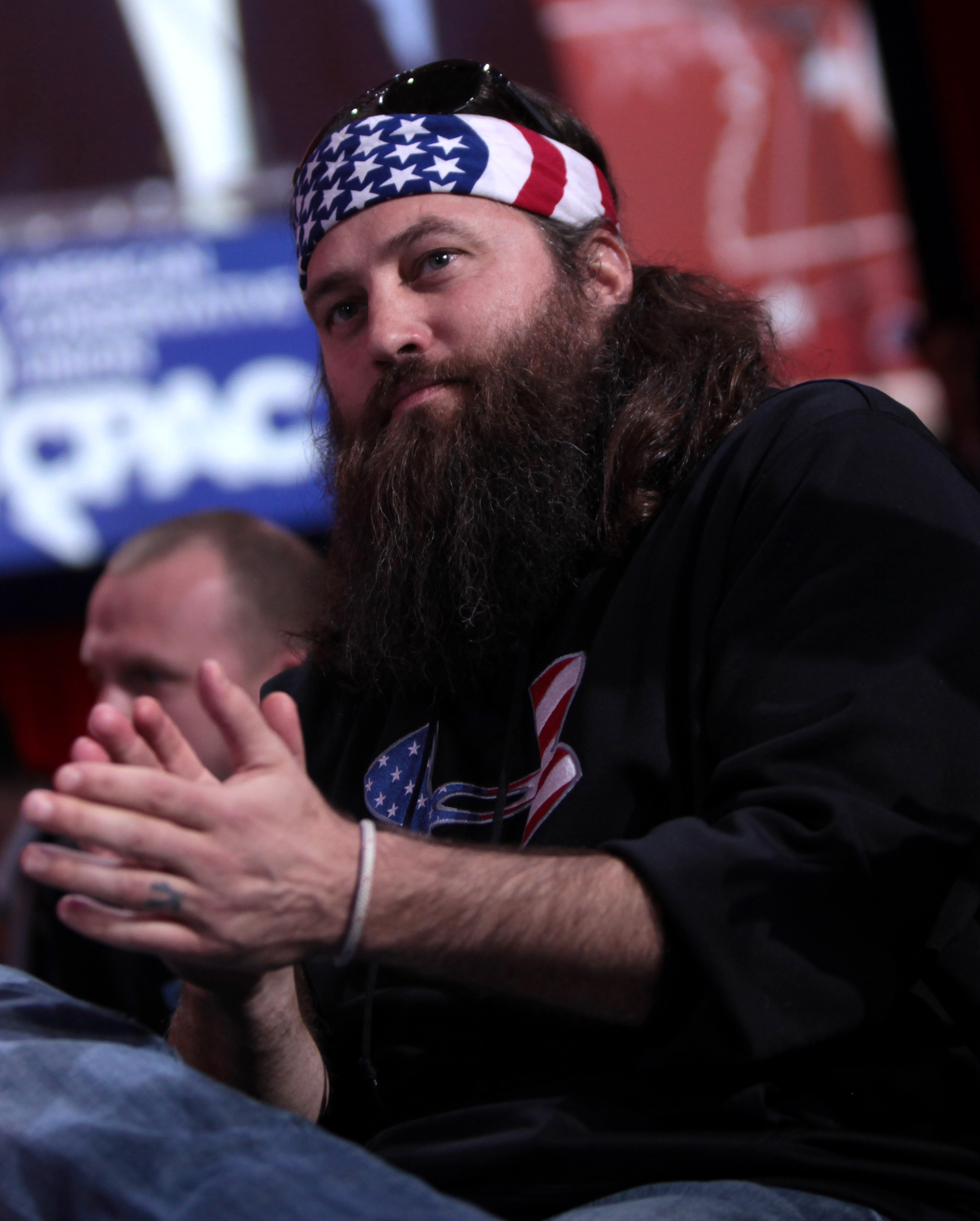
The Robertson family from the TV show Duck Dynasty (Willie Robertson pictured) topped the chart with Duck the Halls: A Robertson Family Christmas.

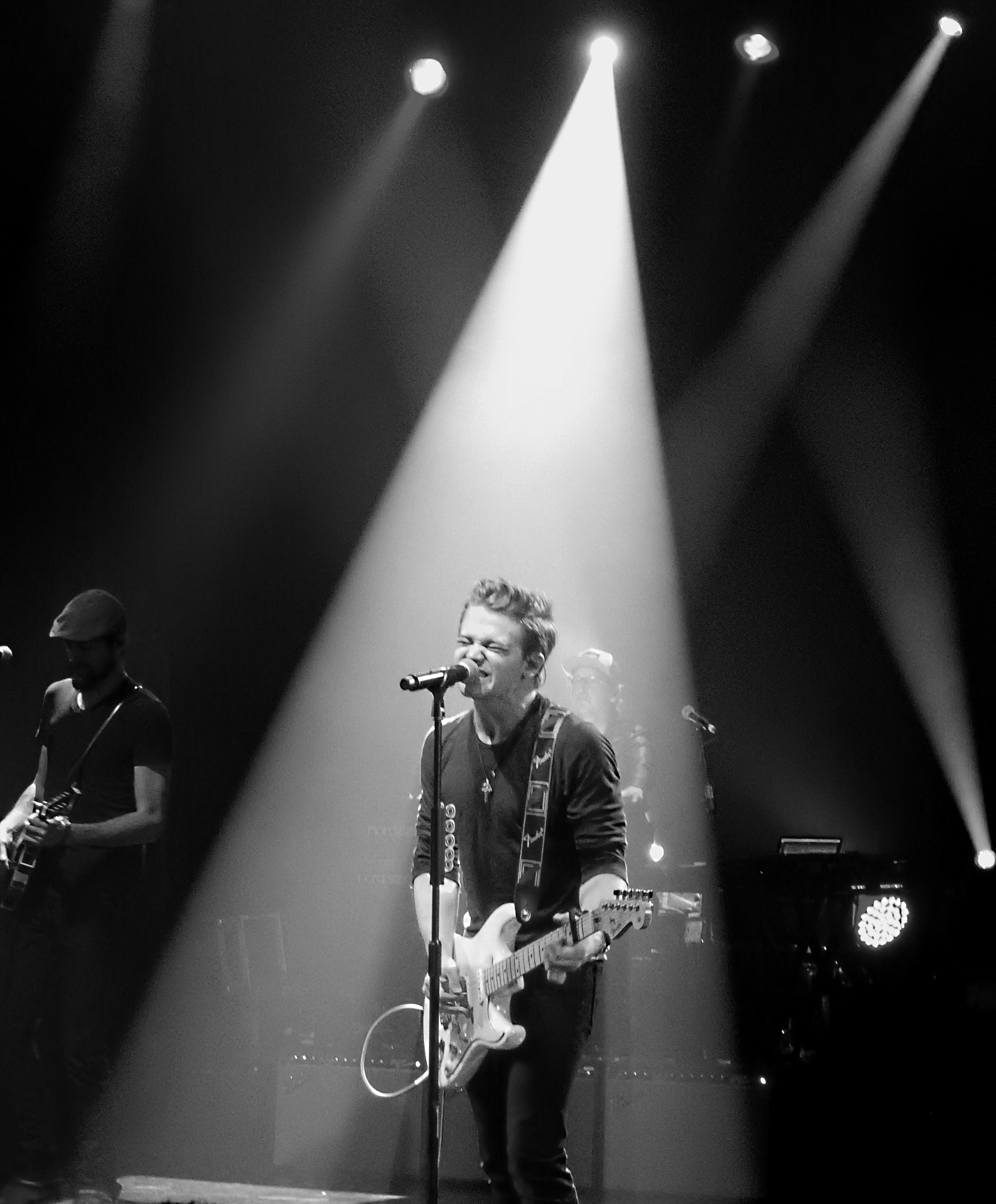
Hunter Hayes reached number one for the first time with his eponymous album.

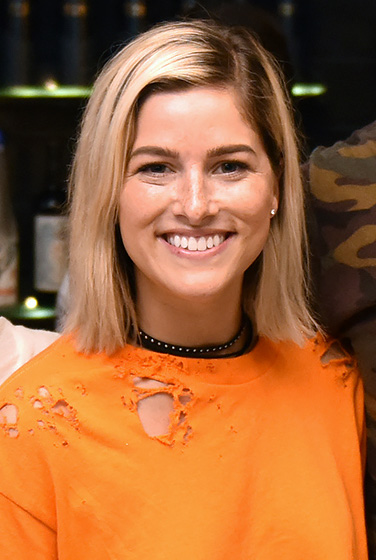
Cassadee Pope, the winner of the third season of The Voice, topped the chart with her debut album.

Issue date	Title	Artist(s)	Ref.
January 5	Red	Taylor Swift	
January 12	Red	Taylor Swift	
January 19	Red	Taylor Swift	
January 26	Red	Taylor Swift	
February 2	Red	Taylor Swift	
February 9	Set You Free	Gary Allan	
February 16	Set You Free	Gary Allan	
February 23	Two Lanes of Freedom	Tim McGraw	
March 2	Red	Taylor Swift	
March 9	Red	Taylor Swift	
March 16	Red	Taylor Swift	
March 23	Spring Break…Here to Party	Luke Bryan	
March 30	Spring Break…Here to Party	Luke Bryan	
April 6	Same Trailer Different Park	Kacey Musgraves	
April 13	Based on a True Story…	Blake Shelton	
April 20	Pioneer	The Band Perry	
April 27	Wheelhouse	Brad Paisley	
May 4	Based on a True Story…	Blake Shelton	
May 11	Based on a True Story…	Blake Shelton	
May 18	Life on a Rock	Kenny Chesney	
May 25	Golden	Lady Antebellum	
June 1	Love Is Everything	George Strait	
June 8	True Believers	Darius Rucker	
June 15	Based on a True Story…	Blake Shelton	
June 22	Based on a True Story…	Blake Shelton	
June 29	Here's to the Good Times	Florida Georgia Line	
July 6	Hunter Hayes	Hunter Hayes	
July 13	Here's to the Good Times	Florida Georgia Line	
July 20	Here's to the Good Times	Florida Georgia Line	
July 27	Here's to the Good Times	Florida Georgia Line	
August 3	Here's to the Good Times	Florida Georgia Line	
August 10	Here's to the Good Times	Florida Georgia Line	
August 17	Here's to the Good Times	Florida Georgia Line	
August 24	Here's to the Good Times	Florida Georgia Line	
August 31	Crash My Party	Luke Bryan	
September 7	Crash My Party	Luke Bryan	
September 14	Crash My Party	Luke Bryan	
September 21	Crash My Party	Luke Bryan	
September 28	Fuse	Keith Urban	
October 5	Off the Beaten Path	Justin Moore	
October 12	Crash My Party	Luke Bryan	
October 19	Crash My Party	Luke Bryan	
October 26	Frame by Frame	Cassadee Pope	
November 2	See You Tonight	Scotty McCreery	
November 9	Crash My Party	Luke Bryan	
November 16	Duck the Halls: A Robertson Family Christmas	The Robertsons	
November 23	Duck the Halls: A Robertson Family Christmas	The Robertsons	
November 30	Duck the Halls: A Robertson Family Christmas	The Robertsons	
December 7	Duck the Halls: A Robertson Family Christmas	The Robertsons	
December 14	Blame It All on My Roots: Five Decades of Influences	Garth Brooks	
December 21	Blame It All on My Roots: Five Decades of Influences	Garth Brooks	
December 28	Blame It All on My Roots: Five Decades of Influences	Garth Brooks	

== See also ==
- 2013 in music
- List of number-one country singles of 2013 (U.S.)
