= Consider This (album) =

Studio album by Aaron Pritchett
- Released: August 10, 2002
- Genre: Country
- Length: 28:44
- Label: Royalty
- Producers: Tom McKillip; Mitch Merrett

Aaron Pritchett chronology
Young in Love (1996)	Consider This (2002)	Something Goin' On Here (2003)

Consider This is the second studio album by Canadian country music singer Aaron Pritchett. It was released on August 10, 2002, by Royalty Records. "Consider This" and "You Can't Say I Didn't Love You" were released as singles.

== Track listing ==
1. "Consider This" (Aaron Pritchett, Rick Tippe) - 3:16
2. "You Can't Say I Didn't Love You" (Trey Bruce, Craig Wiseman) - 4:12
3. "What Some People Throw Away" (Tom Paden, Kelly Shiver, Philip White) - 3:37
4. "Heart Like a Hurricane" (George Wolf) - 3:45
5. "The Last Goodbye" (Pritchett) - 3:26
6. "Bad for Good" (Brett Beavers, Jim Beavers, Troy VanHaefen) - 2:51
7. "Perfectly Blue" (Joe Mack Cherry, Mark Dorion) - 3:34
8. "Tip Jars and Tear Drops" (M. Bombeim, J. Williams) - 4:03
