= Suntan City =

2012 song by Luke Bryan and The Peach Pickers

Song by Luke Bryan

from the album Spring Break 4...Suntan City
- Genre: Country
- Length: 3:54
- Label: Capitol Nashville
- Songwriters: Rhett Akins; Luke Bryan; Dallas Davidson; Ben Hayslip
- Producer: Jeff Stevens

"Suntan City" is a song written by Luke Bryan and The Peach Pickers (Rhett Akins, Dallas Davidson, and Ben Hayslip) and originally recorded by Bryan for his similarly titled fifth extended play, Spring Break 4...Suntan City (2012). It reached number 43 on the Billboard Hot Country Songs chart in 2013 following the release of the compilation album, Spring Break...Here to Party, which comprises all of the tracks from Bryan's previous four Spring Break-themed EPs. Bryan has included the song on the setlists for multiple concert tours.

In 2013, the song was covered by Canadian country rock artist Aaron Pritchett and released to Canadian country radio in May 2013 as the lead single from his 2015 greatest hits album, Body of Work: A Collection of Hits. Pritchett's cover reached number 18 on the Billboard Canada Country chart.

== Reception ==
In a review of the EP, Matt Bjorke of Roughstock wrote that the song "sounds like something that could be a big radio hit."

"Suntan City" debuted at number 19 on the Country Digital Songs chart for the week of March 14, 2012, selling 19,000 copies in its first week. The following year, it later entered the Billboard Hot Country Songs chart dated March 23, 2013 at number 43.

== Live performances and promotion ==
"Suntan City" was included in the setlist for Bryan's 2013 Dirt Road Diaries Tour, which supported Here to Party as well as his subsequent studio album, Crash My Party (2013). It was also performed during his That's My Kind of Night Tour in 2014 and 2015. On the latter tour, he sprayed the audience with beer during the song.

== Charts ==
Chart (2013)	Peak position
US Hot Country Songs (Billboard)	43

== Aaron Pritchett version ==
"Suntan City"

Single by Aaron Pritchett

from the album Body of Work: A Collection of Hits
- Released: May 16, 2013
- Genre: Country
- Length: 3:29
- Label: On Ramp
- Songwriters: Rhett Akins; Luke Bryan; Dallas Davidson; Ben Hayslip
- Producers: Tom McKillip; Carly McKillip

Aaron Pritchett singles chronology
"Summertime" (2012)	"Suntan City" (2013)	"You Should Be" (2013)

Canadian country rock singer Aaron Pritchett recorded a cover version of "Suntan City", which was released by On Ramp Records on May 16, 2013. It serves as the lead single for his first greatest hits album, Body of Work: A Collection of Hits (2015). The song impacted Canadian country radio on May 28, 2013. Pritchett modified some of the lyrics from Bryan's version to give the song a more Canadian feel, including incorporating the slang term "coozie." Tom McKillip, who had produced some of Pritchett's previous singles, co-produced the track with his daughter, Carly McKillip. His version reached number 18 on the Canada Country chart.

=== Charts ===
Chart (2013)	Peak position
Canada Country (Billboard)	18

=== Release history ===
Country	Date	Format	Label	Ref.
Worldwide	May 16, 2013	Digital download	On Ramp Records	
Canada	May 28, 2013	Country radio	On Ramp Records	
Worldwide	January 28, 2015	Digital download (reissue)	On Ramp Records	
