= List of number-one country singles of 2013 (Canada) =

Canada Country was a chart published weekly by Billboard magazine.

This 50-position chart lists the most popular country music songs, calculated weekly by airplay on 31 country music stations across the country as monitored by Nielsen BDS. Songs are ranked by total plays. As with most other Billboard charts, the Canada Country chart features a rule for when a song enters recurrent rotation. A song is declared recurrent if it has been on the chart longer than 30 weeks and is lower than number 20 in rank.

These are the Canadian number-one country singles of 2013, per the BDS Canada Country Airplay chart.

Note that Billboard publishes charts with an issue date approximately 7–10 days in advance.

Key
†	Indicates best charting country single of 2013.

Issue date	Country Song	Artist	Ref.
January 5	"Beer Money"	Kip Moore	
January 12	"Goodbye in Her Eyes"	Zac Brown Band	
January 19	"Goodbye in Her Eyes"	Zac Brown Band	
January 26	"Goodbye in Her Eyes"	Zac Brown Band	
February 2	"How Country Feels"	Randy Houser	
February 9	"How Country Feels"	Randy Houser	
February 16	"Every Storm (Runs Out of Rain)"	Gary Allan	
February 23	"Better Dig Two"	The Band Perry	
March 2	"Better Dig Two"	The Band Perry	
March 9	"One of Those Nights"	Tim McGraw	
March 16	"Sure Be Cool If You Did"	Blake Shelton	
March 23	"Sure Be Cool If You Did"	Blake Shelton	
March 30	"Sure Be Cool If You Did"	Blake Shelton	
April 6	"Sure Be Cool If You Did"	Blake Shelton	
April 13	"Downtown"	Lady Antebellum	
April 20	"Downtown"	Lady Antebellum	
April 27	"Mama's Broken Heart"	Miranda Lambert	
May 4	"Downtown"	Lady Antebellum	
May 11	"Downtown"	Lady Antebellum	
May 18	"Get Your Shine On"	Florida Georgia Line	
May 25	"Get Your Shine On"	Florida Georgia Line	
June 1	"Wagon Wheel"	Darius Rucker	
June 8	"Wagon Wheel"	Darius Rucker	
June 15	"Boys 'Round Here"	Blake Shelton	
June 22	"Boys 'Round Here"	Blake Shelton	
June 29	"Boys 'Round Here"	Blake Shelton	
July 6	"Boys 'Round Here"	Blake Shelton	
July 13	"Boys 'Round Here"	Blake Shelton	
July 20	"Done"	The Band Perry	
July 27	"Done"	The Band Perry	
August 3	"Crash My Party"	Luke Bryan	
August 10	"I Want Crazy"	Hunter Hayes	
August 17	"Runnin' Outta Moonlight" †	Randy Houser	
August 24	"Little Bit of Everything"	Keith Urban	
August 31	"Little Bit of Everything"	Keith Urban	
September 7	"Little Bit of Everything"	Keith Urban	
September 14	"Little Bit of Everything"	Keith Urban	
September 21	"Round Here"	Florida Georgia Line	
September 28	"Round Here"	Florida Georgia Line	
October 5	"Night Train"	Jason Aldean	
October 12	"Night Train"	Jason Aldean	
October 19	"Night Train"	Jason Aldean	
October 26	"Mine Would Be You"	Blake Shelton	
November 2	"Mine Would Be You"	Blake Shelton	
November 9	"Mine Would Be You"	Blake Shelton	
November 16	"Southern Girl"	Tim McGraw	
November 23	"Mine Would Be You"	Blake Shelton	
November 30	"When Your Lips Are So Close"	Gord Bamford	
December 7	"Bounty"	Dean Brody	
December 14	"Sunny and 75"	Joe Nichols	
December 21	"Sunny and 75"	Joe Nichols	
December 28	"Sunny and 75"	Joe Nichols	

== See also ==
- 2013 in music
- List of number-one country singles of 2013 (U.S.)
