= When a Momma's Boy Meets a Daddy's Girl =

2017 single by Aaron Pritchett

Single by Aaron Pritchett

from the album The Score
- Released: January 30, 2017
- Genre: Country
- Length: 3:52
- Label: Big Star
- Songwriters: Aaron Goodvin; Stephen Adrian Lawrance; Miriam Webber

Aaron Pritchett singles chronology
"Out of the Blue" (2016)	"When a Momma's Boy Meets a Daddy's Girl" (2017)	"Worth a Shot" (2018)

Music video
- "When a Momma's Boy Meets a Daddy's Girl" on YouTube

"When a Momma's Boy Meets a Daddy's Girl" is a song recorded by Canadian country artist Aaron Pritchett. The track was written by Aaron Goodvin, Stephen Adrian Lawrance, and Miriam Webber. It was the third and final single off Pritchett's seventh studio album The Score.

== Critical reception ==
Scott Place of nightMair Creative described the song as a "refreshing piece of solid songwriting and straight up from-the-heart singing," noting that the "melody and lyrics come together".

== Accolades ==
Year	Award	Category	Result	Ref
2017	Canadian Country Music Association	Video of the Year	Nominated	

== Commercial performance ==
"When a Momma's Boy Meets a Daddy's Girl" reached a peak of number five on the Billboard Canada Country chart dated May 6, 2017, spending 19 weeks on the chart in total. The song was certified Gold by Music Canada in July 2024.

== Music video ==
The official music video for "When a Momma's Boy Meets a Daddy's Girl" was directed by Cole Northey and premiered on February 2, 2017. It was nominated for "Video of the Year" at the 2017 Canadian Country Music Awards.

== Charts ==
Chart (2017)	Peak position
Canada Country (Billboard)	5

== Certifications ==
Region	Certification	Certified units/sales
Canada (Music Canada)	Gold	40,000^{‡}
^{‡} Sales+streaming figures based on certification alone.
