= Aaron Pritchett =

Canadian country music singer (born 1970)

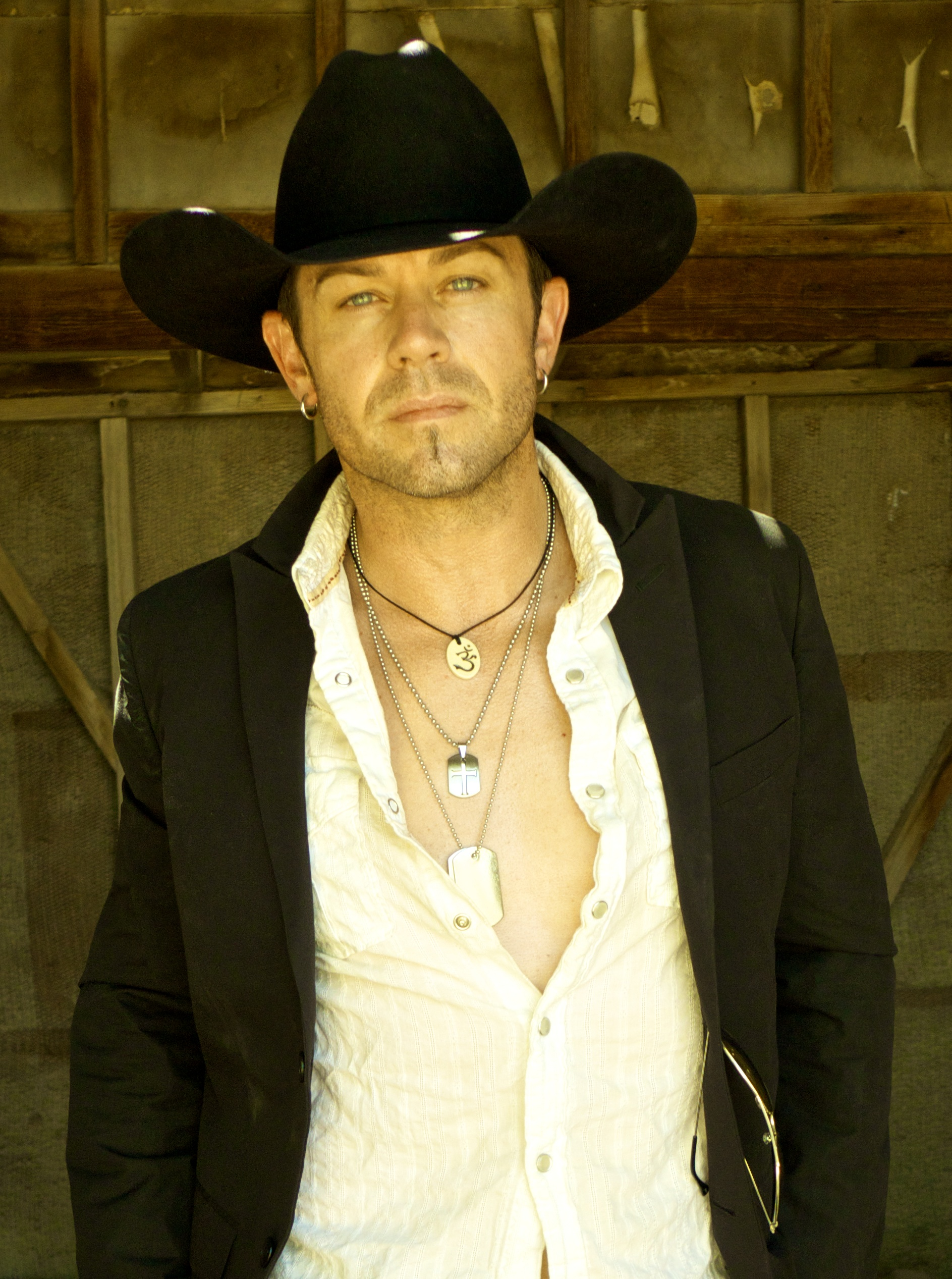

Background information
- Born: Aaron Ronald Pritchett; August 2, 1970 (age 56); Terrace, British Columbia, Canada.
- Origin: Kitimat, British Columbia, Canada
- Genre: Country
- Occupation: Singer-songwriter
- Instrument: Guitar
- Years active: 1996–present
- Labels: Big Star Recordings; Royalty Records; 604 Records
- Website: Official website

Aaron Pritchett (born August 2, 1970) is a Canadian country music singer. He had a No. 1 hit on the Billboard Canada Country chart with "Better When I Do", and has landed gold-certified hits with "Hold My Beer", "Dirt Road in 'Em", "When a Momma's Boy Meets a Daddy's Girl", and "Worth a Shot".

== Biography ==
Pritchett got his start as a DJ at Rooster's Country Cabaret bar in Pitt Meadows, BC, and played in a house band performing cover tunes. He recorded his first album in 1996 titled Young in Love. In 2001, after years of playing clubs in BC and Alberta, Pritchett entered a singing contest called "Project Discovery" sponsored by CMT and won a professional music video directed by internationally acclaimed director, Steven Goldmann as well as $10,000 cash. He put the money towards recording his first album, titled "Consider This". The title track was co-written by Pritchett and longtime BC Country artist Rick Tippe.

Pritchett then released his next two albums Something Going On Here in 2003 and Big Wheel in 2006. The latter included the single "Hold My Beer", which won Songwriter(s) of the Year at the 2007 Canadian Country Music Awards.

In 2008 he was signed to 604 Records, the production company of Nickelback's Chad Kroeger. Pritchett toured Western Canada with Toby Keith and fellow 604 Records artist Jessie Farrell to promote his album, Thankful, which was released on September 9, 2008.

Pritchett released the album In the Driver's Seat on November 9, 2010, under his own record label Decibel Music. Pritchett's first greatest hits album, Body of Work: A Collection of Hits, was released on May 12, 2015. under Big Star Recordings.

In June 2016, Pritchett released his album The Score, a title that commemorated his 20th year recording and releasing music. The lead off single "Dirt Road in 'Em" went to No. 6 on the charts and marked a comeback in Pritchett's career as it was his first top 10 single since 2009. The second release, "Out Of The Blue" followed suit reaching number nine. The album was nominated for Country Album of the Year at the 2017 Juno Awards. His release "When A Momma's Boy Meets A Daddy's Girl" peaked at number five on the Billboard Canada Country chart. In April 2019, Pritchett scored his first number one hit on the Billboard Canada Country chart with "Better When I Do".

In July 2024, Pritchett released the album Demolition, which included the single "Just Wanna Feel It". He supported the album with the "Liquored Up Tour" across Canada with Cory Marks and Matt Lang.

== Band ==
=== Current ===
- Jayson Brinkworth – Drums
- John Sponarski – Guitar, Vocals
- Scott Smith – Guitar, Steel Guitar, Vocals
- Shane Hendrickson – Bass, Vocals
- Emil Gawaziuk – Monitors, stage tech
- Kirby Barber – Guitar, vocals

=== Former ===
- Mitch Merrett
- Jay Buettner
- Mike Sanyshyn
- Ron Briggs
- Mike Norman
- Dennis Marcenko
- Darren Parris
- Bruce Morrison
- Peter Sweetzir
- Ken Friesen

== Discography ==
=== Albums ===
==== Studio albums ====
Title	Album details
Young in Love	Release date: October 21, 1996; Label: self-released
Consider This	Release date: August 13, 2002; Label: Royalty Records
Something Goin' On Here	Release date: September 9, 2003; Label: Royalty Records
Big Wheel	Release date: April 18, 2006; Label: OPM Records
Thankful	Release date: September 9, 2008; Label: 604 Records
In the Driver's Seat	Release date: November 9, 2010; Label: Decibel Records
The Score	Release date: June 24, 2016; Label: Big Star Recordings
Demolition	Release date: July 5, 2024; Label: Big Star Recordings

==== Compilation albums ====
Title	Album details
Body of Work: A Collection of Hits	Release date: May 12, 2015; Label: Big Star Recordings

=== Extended plays ===
Title	EP details
Out on the Town	Release date: January 11, 2019; Label: Big Star Recordings

=== Singles ===
==== 2000s ====
Year	Single	Peak positions		Certifications	Album
Year	Single	CAN	CAN Country	Certifications	Album
2002	"Consider This"	—	*		Consider This
2002	"You Can't Say I Didn't Love You"	—	*		Consider This
2003	"New Frontier"	—	*		Something Goin' On Here
2004	"My Way"	—	7		Something Goin' On Here
2005	"John Roland Wood"	—	22		Something Goin' On Here
2005	"Lucky for Me"	—	10		Something Goin' On Here
2006	"Big Wheel"	—	3		Big Wheel
2006	"Hold My Beer"	—	9	MC: Gold	Big Wheel
2006	"Warm Safe Place"	—	6		Big Wheel
2007	"The Weight"	90	6		Big Wheel
2007	"Done You Wrong"	79	7		Big Wheel
2008	"Let's Get Rowdy"	98	13		Thankful
2008	"How Do I Get There"	79	8		Thankful
2009	"Hell Bent for Buffalo"	84	10		Thankful
2009	"Hard to Miss"	—	18		Thankful
"—" denotes releases that did not chart "*" denotes releases where no chart existed

==== 2010s-20s ====
Year	Single	Peak positions	Certifications	Album
Year	Single	CAN Country	Certifications	Album
2010	"Nothing but Us"	23		Thankful
2010	"Light It Up"	28		In the Driver's Seat
2011	"Drive"	26		In the Driver's Seat
2011	"Coming Clean"	42		In the Driver's Seat
2012	"I Want to Be in It with You"	31		In the Driver's Seat
2012	"Summertime"	31		Non-album single
2013	"Suntan City"	18		Body of Work: A Collection of Hits
2013	"You Should Be"	—		Non-album singles
2014	"Hold You Like My Whiskey"	—		Non-album singles
2014	"Boat on the Water"	28		Body of Work: A Collection of Hits
2015	"Wake You with a Kiss"	29		Body of Work: A Collection of Hits
2016	"Dirt Road in 'Em"	6	MC: Gold	The Score
2016	"Out of the Blue"	13		The Score
2017	"When a Momma's Boy Meets a Daddy's Girl"	5	MC: Gold	The Score
2018	"Worth a Shot"	6	MC: Gold	Out on the Town
2018	"Better When I Do"	1		Out on the Town
2019	"Good Thing"	33		Non-album singles
2020	"Never Seen Me Like This"	50		Non-album singles
2021	"Not Enough You"	—		Non-album singles
2024	"Just Wanna Feel It"	—		Demolition
2025	"Let It Ride"	—		TBA
"—" denotes releases that did not chart

=== Featured singles ===
Year	Single	Artist	Peak chart positions	Album
Year	Single	Artist	CAN Country	Album
2021	"Catch and Release"	The Heels	47	I Am

=== Other charted songs ===
Year	Single	Peak positions	Album
Year	Single	CAN Country	Album
2017	"Lit Up Tonight"	43	Non-album single

=== Guest appearances ===
List of non-single appearances, showing year released, other performing artists and album name
Title	Year	Artist(s)	Album
"Angels"	2009	One More Girl	Big Sky
"Home for Christmas"	2013	George Canyon, One More Girl, Jordan McIntosh	Non-album song

=== Music videos ===
Year	Video	Director
2002	"Consider This"	Steven Goldmann
2002	"You Can't Say I Didn't Love You"	Stephano Barberis
2003	"New Frontier"	Stephano Barberis
2004	"My Way"	Stephano Barberis
2004	"John Roland Wood"	Stephano Barberis
2005	"Lucky for Me"	Stephano Barberis
2006	"Big Wheel"	
2006	"Hold My Beer"	Stephano Barberis
2006	"Warm Safe Place"	Stephano Barberis
2007	"Done You Wrong"	Stephano Barberis
2008	"Let's Get Rowdy"	Colin Minihan
2008	"How Do I Get There"	
2009	"Hell Bent for Buffalo"	Colin Minihan
2010	"Light It Up"	Carolyne Stossel
2011	"Coming Clean"	Stephano Barberis
2013	"Home for Christmas" (with George Canyon, One More Girl and Jordan McIntosh)	Stephen Lubig
2014	"Boat on the Water"	Stephano Barberis
2016	"Dirt Road in 'Em"	Cole Northey
2016	"Out of the Blue"	Cole Northey
2017	"When A Momma's Boy Meets A Daddy's Girl"	Cole Northey
2018	"Worth A Shot"	
2018	"Better When I Do"	Cole Northey

== Awards and nominations ==
Year	Association	Category	Result	Ref
2004	British Columbia Country Music Association	Entertainer of the Year	Won	
2004	British Columbia Country Music Association	Male Vocalist of the Year	Won	
2004	British Columbia Country Music Association	Album of the Year – Lucky For Me	Won	
2004	Canadian Country Music Association	Chevy Trucks Rising Star Award	Nominated	
2004	Canadian Country Music Association	Album of the Year – Something Goin' On Here	Nominated	
2004	Canadian Country Music Association	Independent Male Artist of the Year	Won	
2004	Canadian Country Music Association	Independent Song of the Year – "New Frontier"	Won	
2005	Canadian Country Music Association	Male Artist of the Year	Nominated	
2005	Canadian Country Music Association	CMT Video of the Year – "John Roland Wood"	Nominated	
2005	Canadian Country Music Association	Independent Male Artist of the Year	Won	
2005	British Columbia Country Music Association	Entertainer of the Year	Won	
2005	British Columbia Country Music Association	Male Vocalist of the Year	Won	
2005	British Columbia Country Music Association	Songwriter of the Year – "Lucky For Me" (with Mike Norman, Mike Steen)	Won	
2005	British Columbia Country Music Association	Single of the Year – "Lucky For Me"	Won	
2006	Canadian Country Music Association	Male Artist of the Year	Nominated	
2006	Canadian Country Music Association	Album of the Year – Big Wheel	Nominated	
2006	Canadian Country Music Association	Single of the Year – "Big Wheel"	Nominated	
2006	Canadian Country Music Association	SOCAN Songwriter of the Year – "Big Wheel"	Nominated	
2006	Canadian Country Music Association	Independent Male Artist of the Year	Nominated	
2006	Canadian Country Music Association	Independent Single of the Year – "Big Wheel"	Nominated	
2006	British Columbia Country Music Association	Entertainer of the Year	Won	
2006	British Columbia Country Music Association	Male Vocalist of the Year	Won	
2006	British Columbia Country Music Association	Album of the Year – Big Wheel	Won	
2006	British Columbia Country Music Association	Songwriter of the Year – "Big Wheel" (with Mitch Merrett, Darryl Burgess)	Won	
2006	British Columbia Country Music Association	Single of the Year – "Big Wheel"	Won	
2006	British Columbia Country Music Association	Video of the Year – "Hold My Beer"	Won	
2007	Juno Awards of 2007	Country Recording of the Year – Big Wheel	Nominated	
2007	Canadian Country Music Association	Male Artist of the Year	Nominated	
2007	Canadian Country Music Association	SOCAN Songwriter of the Year – "Hold My Beer"	Won	
2007	British Columbia Country Music Association	Entertainer of the Year	Won	
2007	British Columbia Country Music Association	Male Vocalist of the Year	Won	
2007	British Columbia Country Music Association	Songwriter of the Year – "Done You Wrong" (with Mitch Merrett, Tim Taylor)	Won	
2007	British Columbia Country Music Association	Single of the Year – "Done You Wrong"	Won	
2008	British Columbia Country Music Association	Entertainer of the Year	Won	
2008	British Columbia Country Music Association	Male Vocalist of the Year	Won	
2008	British Columbia Country Music Association	Fans Choice Award	Won	
2009	Juno Awards of 2009	Country Recording of the Year – Thankful	Nominated	
2009	Canadian Country Music Association	Fans' Choice Award	Nominated	
2009	Canadian Country Music Association	Album of the Year – Thankful	Nominated	
2009	British Columbia Country Music Association	Album of the Year – Thankful	Won	
2014	British Columbia Country Music Association	Entertainer of the Year	Nominated	
2014	British Columbia Country Music Association	Male Vocalist of the Year	Nominated	
2014	British Columbia Country Music Association	Fans Choice Award	Won	
2014	British Columbia Country Music Association	Single of the Year – "Boat on the Water"	Nominated	
2014	British Columbia Country Music Association	Video of the Year – "Boat on the Water"	Won	
2015	British Columbia Country Music Association	Entertainer of the Year	Nominated	
2015	British Columbia Country Music Association	Male Vocalist of the Year	Nominated	
2015	British Columbia Country Music Association	Single of the Year – "Wake You With a Kiss"	Nominated	
2016	British Columbia Country Music Association	Fans Choice Award	Won	
2016	British Columbia Country Music Association	Single of the Year – "Dirt Road In Em"	Won	
2016	British Columbia Country Music Association	Video of the Year – "Dirt Road In Em"	Won	
2016	British Columbia Country Music Association	Album of the Year – The Score	Nominated	
2016	British Columbia Country Music Association	Entertainer of the Year	Nominated	
2016	British Columbia Country Music Association	Male Vocalist of the Year	Nominated	
2017	Juno Awards	Country Album of the Year – The Score	Nominated	
2017	Western Canadian Music Awards	Country Artist of the Year	Nominated	
2017	Canadian Country Music Association	Male Artist of the Year	Nominated	
2017	Canadian Country Music Association	Video of the Year – "When A Momma's Boy Meets A Daddy's Girl"	Nominated	
2019	British Columbia Country Music Association	Single of the Year – "Better When I Do"	Won	
2019	British Columbia Country Music Association	Album of the Year – Out on the Town	Won	
2019	British Columbia Country Music Association	Entertainer of the Year	Won	
2019	British Columbia Country Music Association	Male Vocalist of the Year	Won	
2019	Western Canadian Music Awards	Country Artist of the Year	Nominated	
