= Big Wheel (Aaron Pritchett album) =

Studio album by Aaron Pritchett
- Released: April 18, 2006
- Genre: Country
- Length: 44:18
- Label: OPM
- Producer: Tom McKillip

Aaron Pritchett chronology
Something Goin' On Here (2003)	Big Wheel (2006)	Thankful (2008)

Big Wheel is the fourth studio album by Canadian country music singer Aaron Pritchett. It was released on April 18, 2006 by OPM Records. "Big Wheel," "Hold My Beer," "Warm Safe Place," "The Weight" and "Done You Wrong" were released as singles.

Big Wheel was nominated by the Canadian Country Music Association for Album of the Year in September 2006 and for a 2007 Juno Award.

== Track listing ==
1. "Big Wheel" (Aaron Pritchett, Mitch Merrett, Darryl Burgess) - 4:40
2. "Drivin' Song" (Pritchett, Merrett, Tim Taylor) - 2:50
3. "Lonely's to the Bone" (Wade Kirby, Kim Tribble) - 4:14
4. "Gone" (Pritchett, Mike Norman) - 3:44
5. "On My Way to You" (Trey Bruce, Jeremy Stover) - 4:02
6. "The Weight" (Robbie Robertson) - 3:48
7. "Warm Safe Place" (Marcus Hummon, Brett James) - 3:41
8. "You're Not Gonna Miss Me" (Pritchett, Merrett, Taylor) - 4:01
9. "Done You Wrong" (Pritchett, Merrett, Taylor) - 4:13
10. "Hold My Beer" (Pritchett, Merrett, Deric Ruttan) - 4:10
11. "Somethin' 'Bout a Train" (Pritchett, Merrett, Taylor) - 4:49
12. "The Weight" feat. Tyler Connolly of Theory of a Deadman - deluxe edition only
13. "Hold My Beer" (Stadium Remix) - deluxe edition only
