= Hold My Beer (Aaron Pritchett song) =

2006 single by Aaron Pritchett

Single by Aaron Pritchett

from the album Big Wheel
- Released: 2006
- Genre: Country
- Length: 4:10
- Label: OPM
- Songwriter(s): Aaron Pritchett; Deric Ruttan; Mitch Merrett

Aaron Pritchett singles chronology
| "Big Wheel" (2006) | "Hold My Beer" (2006) | "Warm Safe Place" (2006) |

Music video
- "Hold My Beer" on YouTube

"Hold My Beer" is a song recorded by Canadian country music artist Aaron Pritchett. The song was the second single off his fourth studio album Big Wheel. Pritchett co-wrote the song with Deric Ruttan and Mitch Merrett. The three writers won "Songwriter(s) of the Year" at the 2007 Canadian Country Music Awards for the song.

== Background and content ==
Pritchett and his co-writers were in a songwriting session when he uttered the phrase "hold my beer", which he stated "just popped into" his head. They wrote the song as "a joke", not initially intending to record it. Neither Pritchett nor his co-writers expected the song to achieve any success.

The primary lyrics of the chorus are "Hold my beer, while I kiss your girlfriend. 'Cause she needs a real man / Not a boy like you". Years after the song's release, Pritchett remarked that it is like a "nursery rhyme, an earworm," as "it gets stuck in your head and you never forget it".

== Accolades ==
| Year | Award | Category | Result | Ref |
|---|---|---|---|---|
| 2006 | British Columbia Country Music Association | Video of the Year | Won | |
| 2007 | Canadian Country Music Association | SOCAN Songwriter(s) of the Year | Won | |

== Commercial performance ==
"Hold My Beer" reached a peak of number nine on the Billboard Canada Country chart dated August 26, 2006, marking Pritchett's fourth top ten hit. The song peaked after only six weeks on the chart, while it charted for 22 weeks in total. On August 24, 2017, the song became Pritchett's first single to be certified Gold by Music Canada.

== Music video ==
The official music video for "Hold My Beer" was directed by Stephano Barberis, and features footage of Pritchett performing the song, in addition to showing several actors portraying a scene at a bar.

== Charts ==
Chart performance for "Hold My Beer"
| Chart (2006) | Peak position |
|---|---|
| Canada Country (Billboard) | 9 |

== Certifications ==
| Region | Certification | Certified units/sales |
|---|---|---|
| Canada (Music Canada) | Gold | 40,000^{‡} |
^{‡} Sales+streaming figures based on certification alone.
