= Something Goin' On Here =

Studio album by Aaron Pritchett
- Released: October 2003
- Genre: Country
- Length: 35:56
- Label: Royalty
- Producer: Tom McKillip

Aaron Pritchett chronology
Consider This (2002)	Something Goin' On Here (2003)	Big Wheel (2006)

Something Goin' On Here is the third studio album by Canadian country music singer Aaron Pritchett. It was released in 2003 by Royalty Records. "New Frontier", "My Way", "John Roland Wood" and "Lucky for Me" were released as singles. "John Roland Wood" was previously released as a single by Deryl Dodd from his 1998 self-titled album.

== Track listing ==
1. "18" (John Bettis, Danny Wells) - 4:12
2. "Lucky for Me" (Mike Norman, Aaron Pritchett, Mike Steen) - 3:09
3. "My Way" (Deric Ruttan, Tim Taylor) - 3:44
4. "John Roland Wood" (Troy Jones) - 3:23
5. "Little Things" (Tom McKillip, Pritchett) - 4:06
6. "Don’t Even Think About It" (Darryl Burgess, Taylor) - 2:53
7. "Right Down the Line" (Gerald Rafferty) - 3:15
8. "New Frontier" (Burgess, Tommy Polk) - 3:53
9. "Best Days" (Carol Ann Brown, Gloria Nissenson, Gary Portnoy) - 3:25
10. "Something Goin on Here" (Norman, Pritchett) - 3:56
