= In the Driver's Seat =

Studio album by Aaron Pritchett
- Released: November 9, 2010
- Genre: Country
- Length: 41:59
- Label: Decibel

Aaron Pritchett chronology
Thankful (2008)	In the Driver's Seat (2010)	Body of Work: A Collection of Hits (2015)

Singles from In the Driver's Seat
- 1. "Light It Up" Released: October 18, 2010; 2. "Drive" Released: May 30, 2011; 3. "Coming Clean" Released: August 22, 2011; 4. "I Want to Be in It with You" Released: January 23, 2012

In the Driver's Seat is the sixth studio album by Canadian country music artist Aaron Pritchett. It was released on November 9, 2010 by Decibel Records.

== Track listing ==
No.	Title	Length
1.	"Walk All Over Me"	3:07
2.	"Light It Up"	3:45
3.	"Coming Clean"	3:40
4.	"She's Going Somewhere"	3:01
5.	"Drive"	3:59
6.	"Livin' It Up"	4:05
7.	"You and Me"	3:34
8.	"Worth the Wait"	3:41
9.	"Pinch"	2:58
10.	"Morning After the Night Before"	3:11
11.	"Wild One"	3:21
12.	"I Want to Be in It with You"	3:37
