= Spring Break 4...Suntan City =

Spring Break 4…Suntan City

EP by Luke Bryan
- Released: March 6, 2012
- Genre: Country
- Length: 15:35
- Label: Capitol Nashville
- Producer: Jeff Stevens

Luke Bryan chronology
Tailgates & Tanlines (2011)	Spring Break 4…Suntan City (2012)	Spring Break...Here to Party (2013)

Professional ratings
Review scores
Source	Rating
Taste of Country	2/5 stars

Spring Break 4…Suntan City is the fifth extended play (EP) by American country music artist Luke Bryan. It was released on March 6, 2012 by Capitol Nashville.

== Critical reception ==
Billy Dukes of Taste of Country gave the song two stars out of five, saying that "If you’ve got spring break plans that involve suntan lotion and sexy strangers willing to rub it in, Bryan has your soundtrack. The truth is, most people stay home and work or hang out with family over the spring break vacation. Play this album into any other from the singer's catalog... and it becomes obvious the recording was tossed together quickly. It that way, it is sort of like Spring Break."

== Track listing ==
No.	Title	Length
1.	"Suntan City"	3:54
2.	"Spring Break-Up"	3:06
3.	"Little Bit Later On"	4:07
4.	"Shake the Sand"	4:28
Total length:		15:35

== Chart performance ==
=== Weekly charts ===
Chart (2012)	Peak position
US Billboard 200	9
US Top Country Albums (Billboard)	2

=== Year-end charts ===
Chart (2012)	Position
US Top Country Albums (Billboard)	70
