= Worth a Shot (Aaron Pritchett song) =

2018 single by Aaron Pritchett

Single by Aaron Pritchett

from the EP Out on the Town
- Released: May 11, 2018
- Genre: Country
- Length: 3:42
- Label: Big Star
- Songwriter(s): Andy Albert; Clint Lagerberg

Aaron Pritchett singles chronology
"When a Momma's Boy Meets a Daddy's Girl" (2017)	"Worth a Shot" (2018)	"Better When I Do" (2018)

Music video
- "Worth a Shot" on YouTube

"Worth a Shot" is a song recorded by Canadian country artist Aaron Pritchett. The track was written by Andy Albert and Clint Lagerberg. It was the lead single off Pritchett's extended play Out on the Town.

== Commercial performance ==
"Worth a Shot" reached a peak of #6 on the Billboard Canada Country chart dated October 6, 2018, marking Pritchett's ninth Top 10 hit. It has been certified Gold by Music Canada.

== Music video ==
The official music video for "Worth a Shot" premiered on June 19, 2018. It was directed by Cole Northey. The video stars Justin Pasutto, and features a cameo appearance from his fiancée, Jillian Harris, most known for her role on reality television show Love It or List It Vancouver.

== Charts ==
Chart (2018)	Peak position
Canada Country (Billboard)	6

== Certifications ==
Region	Certification	Certified units/sales
Canada (Music Canada)	Gold	40,000^{‡}
^{‡} Sales+streaming figures based on certification alone.
