= Spring Break...Here to Party =

Spring Break…Here to Party

Compilation album by Luke Bryan
- Released: March 5, 2013
- Genre: Country
- Length: 51:18
- Label: Capitol Nashville
- Producer: Jeff Stevens

Luke Bryan chronology
Spring Break 4...Suntan City (2012)	Spring Break…Here to Party (2013)	Crash My Party (2013)

Professional ratings
Review scores
Source	Rating
AllMusic	3/5 stars

Spring Break…Here to Party is a compilation album by American country music artist Luke Bryan. It was released on March 5, 2013, by Capitol Nashville. The album is a compilation of songs from Bryan's first four spring break-themed EPs, plus two new songs, "Buzzkill" and "Just a Sip." A music video was filmed for "Buzzkill" though it was never released as a single.

== Reception ==
=== Critical ===
Stephen Thomas Erlewine of AllMusic gave the album three stars out of five, writing that "not one song is undeniable, the kind that works into the subconscious, but that doesn't really matter, as this is just breezy fun, a collection of cheerful drinking songs that never threaten to careen out of control."

=== Commercial ===
The album sold 150,000 copies in its first week of release, becoming Bryan's first number one album on the Billboard 200 chart. The album has sold 605,000 copies in the US as of May 2015.

== Track listing ==
No.	Title	Writer(s)	Original EP	Length
1.	"Suntan City"	Rhett Akins; Luke Bryan; Dallas Davidson; Ben Hayslip	Spring Break 4...Suntan City	3:54
2.	"Just a Sip"	Bryan; Michael Carter; Cole Swindell	NEW RECORDING	2:53
3.	"Buzzkill"	Bryan; Jason Sever; Rachel Thibodeau	NEW RECORDING	3:37
4.	"If You Ain't Here to Party"	Bryan; Rodney Clawson	Spring Break 3...It's A Shore Thing	3:53
5.	"Little Bit Later On"	Bryan; Ashley Gorley; Luke Laird	Spring Break 4...Suntan City	4:07
6.	"In Love with the Girl"	Bryan; Carter; Jim McCormick; Swindell	Spring Break 3...It's A Shore Thing	3:28
7.	"Shore Thing"	Bryan; Carter; Swindell	Spring Break 3...It's A Shore Thing	3:53
8.	"Sorority Girl"	Bryan; Davidson; McCormick	Spring Break with All My Friends	3:23
9.	"Shake the Sand"	Bryan; Carter; Swindell	Spring Break 4...Suntan City	4:28
10.	"Love in a College Town"	Bryan; Carter; Swindell	Spring Break 3...It's A Shore Thing	3:23
11.	"Wild Weekend"	Bryan; Clawson; Craig Wiseman	Spring Break 2...Hangover Edition	4:01
12.	"Cold Beer Drinker"	Bryan; Jason Matthews; McCormick	Spring Break 2...Hangover Edition	3:50
13.	"Spring Break-Up"	Bryan; Gorley	Spring Break 4...Suntan City	3:06
14.	"Take My Drunk Ass Home"	Bryan; Matthews	Spring Break with All My Friends	3:22
Total length:				51:18

== Personnel ==
- Eli Beaird – bass guitar
- Larry Beaird – acoustic guitar
- Mike Brignardello – bass guitar
- Jim "Moose" Brown – Hammond B-3 organ, piano
- Luke Bryan – lead vocals
- Pat Buchanan – electric guitar
- Perry Coleman – background vocals
- J.T. Corenflos – electric guitar
- Howard Duck – Hammond B-3 organ, piano
- Shannon Forrest – drums, percussion
- Kenny Greenberg – electric guitar
- Rob Hajacos – fiddle, mandolin
- Wes Hightower – background vocals
- Mark Hill – bass guitar
- Steve Hinson – lap steel guitar, pedal steel guitar
- Wayne Killius – percussion
- Jeff King – electric guitar
- Troy Lancaster – electric guitar
- Tim Lauer – Hammond B-3 organ, piano
- Brent Mason – electric guitar
- Pat McGrath – acoustic guitar
- Greg Morrow – drums, percussion
- Duncan Mullins – bass guitar
- Russ Pahl – lap steel guitar, pedal steel guitar
- Michael Payne – electric guitar
- Brian Pruitt – drums, percussion
- Mike Rojas – Hammond B-3 organ, piano, accordion
- Adam Shoenfeld – electric guitar
- Hank Singer – fiddle, mandolin
- Jimmie Lee Sloas – bass guitar
- Joe Spivey – bouzouki, fiddle, mandolin
- Jeff Stevens – background vocals
- Jody Stevens – beats, programming
- Russell Terrell – background vocals
- Ilya Toshinsky – acoustic guitar
- John Willis – acoustic guitar, electric guitar
- Lonnie Wilson – drums, percussion

== Charts and certifications ==
=== Weekly charts ===
Chart (2013)	Peak position
Canadian Albums Chart	1
US Billboard 200	1
US Billboard Top Country Albums	1

=== Year-end charts ===
Chart (2013)	Position
US Billboard 200	45
US Top Country Albums (Billboard)	10

=== Certifications ===
Region	Certification	Certified units/sales
United States (RIAA)	Gold	605,000
