= Sean Patrick McGraw =

American singer

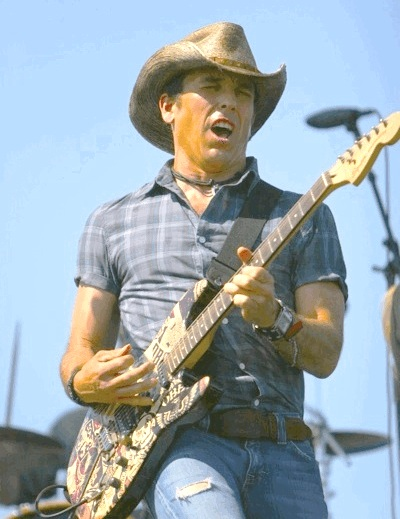
- in concert

Background information
- Genres: Country
- Occupation: Singer-songwriter
- Years active: 2005—present
- Label: Little Engine Records

Sean Patrick McGraw, an American country music singer, is a former Nashville Star semi-finalist who leads a prominent unsigned touring act. Following the 2005 release of his CD Songs for Saturday Night, McGraw and his band went on tour and continue to be on the road. In 2007, McGraw played over 140 dates, from Toronto to Mobile to Las Vegas, garnering good reviews from critics and concert-goers alike.

Describing his music as "something like Lyle Lovett singing Springsteen songs while wearing Dwight Yoakam's hat", McGraw has earned respect among songwriters as well. His song "Fiona" won top honors at the 2007 Independent Music Awards, first place at the American Songwriting Competition and at the Mountain Stages New Song Festival, as well as being named finalist in the International Songwriting Competition and the Mid-Atlantic Song Competition. An esteemed Music Row critic/columnist hailed "Fiona" as "The classiest country rocker I've heard all year." This cut and others from Songs For Saturday Night are featured in the short-length documentaryTen Days on Tour which aired on CMT in 2006.

McGraw is also sponsored by Fender Guitars, Jagermiester, Budweiser, The Summit Group, Harley Davidson Footwear and Gowanda.

A song he co-wrote, "Dollar Ain't Worth a Dime", with David Kroll, appeared in regular rotation on CMT in 2009.

During the summer of 2009, he made his national television debut on "Jimmy Kimmel Live!" and opened several dates for Toby Keith and Trace Adkins on America's Toughest Tour, garnering great reviews as well as expanding his dedicated fan base.

Following the tour with Toby Keith and Trace Adkins, Sean Patrick McGraw headlined his own show at the Hard Rock Cafe in Nashville, Tennessee on January 27, 2010. Critics claimed that the show "Bubbled over with the Zietgeisty brand of country-rock that Sean Patrick McGraw has become known for."

February 2010 brought many new accomplishments for McGraw. He was published in Country Weekly, a prominent country music magazine, as a selection for their "Who to Watch in 2010" feature. Later that month, Sean joined Eric Church and Josh Thompson for the 2010 Jägermeister Tour. He opened six dates in cities such as Clifton Park, New York, Boston, Massachusetts and Nashville, Tennessee. His stay on the tour spanned from February 12 to the 25th.

On April 18, 2010, McGraw sang the national anthem at the NHRA (National Hot Rod Association) Summit Finals race in Las Vegas.

In June 2010, McGraw took part in Nashville's annual CMA Music Festival and joined several popular country acts like Cowboy Troy, The McClymonts, and Sarah Buxton among others to perform on the Hard Rock Cafe stage. CMA Music Festival is a yearly concert series that features performances and autograph events from both up-and-coming acts and veteran, established country artists. Also in June 2010, two of Sean Patrick McGraw's singles were featured in episodes of the HBO vampire series "True Blood" – "Drink with Hank" on June 13 and "Anyone but Me" on June 20.

On July 26, McGraw delivered another national anthem performance as well as acoustic set on the home plate of US Cellular Field, home of the Chicago White Sox. The crowd numbered around 30,000 for the event, with Sean singing prior to the first pitch of the game, in which the White Sox played the Seattle Mariners.

McGraw, a native of Dunkirk, New York, often appears at events in Western New York.

== Discography ==
=== Studio albums ===
Title	Details
Songs for Saturday Night	Release date: August 19, 2005; Label: self-released
Long Way from Slowin' Down	Release date: November 7, 2008; Label: Little Engine Records

=== Singles ===
Year	Single	Album
2008	"Fiona"	Songs from Saturday Night
2009	"Dollar Ain't Worth a Dime"	Long Way from Slowin' Down
2010	"My So Called Life"	Must Be Living Tonight
2012	"Git Yer Cowboy On"	Long Way from Slowin' Down
2013	"I'm That Guy"	Hard Way to Make an Easy Living

=== Music videos ===
Year	Video	Director
2009	"Dollar Ain't Worth a Dime"	Michael Estrella
2010	"My So Called Life"	Michael Estrella
2011	"What I'd Do"	Michael Estrella
2014	"I'm That Guy"	
