= Mitch Merrett =

- Origin: Langley, British Columbia, Canada
- Genres: Country music
- Occupation(s): Music manager Record producer
- Instrument: Gibson Robot Guitar

Mitch Merrett is a record producer, music manager, and country musician from Langley, British Columbia, Canada. He plays a Gibson Robot Guitar. He studied music at Selkirk College in Nelson, graduating from the Contemporary Music and Technology program with a major in performance. In 2007, he and Tom McKillip were named Record Producers of the Year by the Canadian Country Music Association (CCMA) for their work on Aaron Pritchett's album Big Wheel. Also that year, the Society of Composers, Authors and Music Publishers of Canada named Merrett, Pritchett, and Deric Ruttan Songwriters of the Year for their work on "Hold My Beer," a song that appeared on Big Wheel and that a CBC News reporter called "irreverent." In 2010, Merrett produced Chad Brownlee's self-titled debut album. In 2012, the British Columbia Country Music Association named Merrett Producer of the Year.
