= Joe Nichols discography =

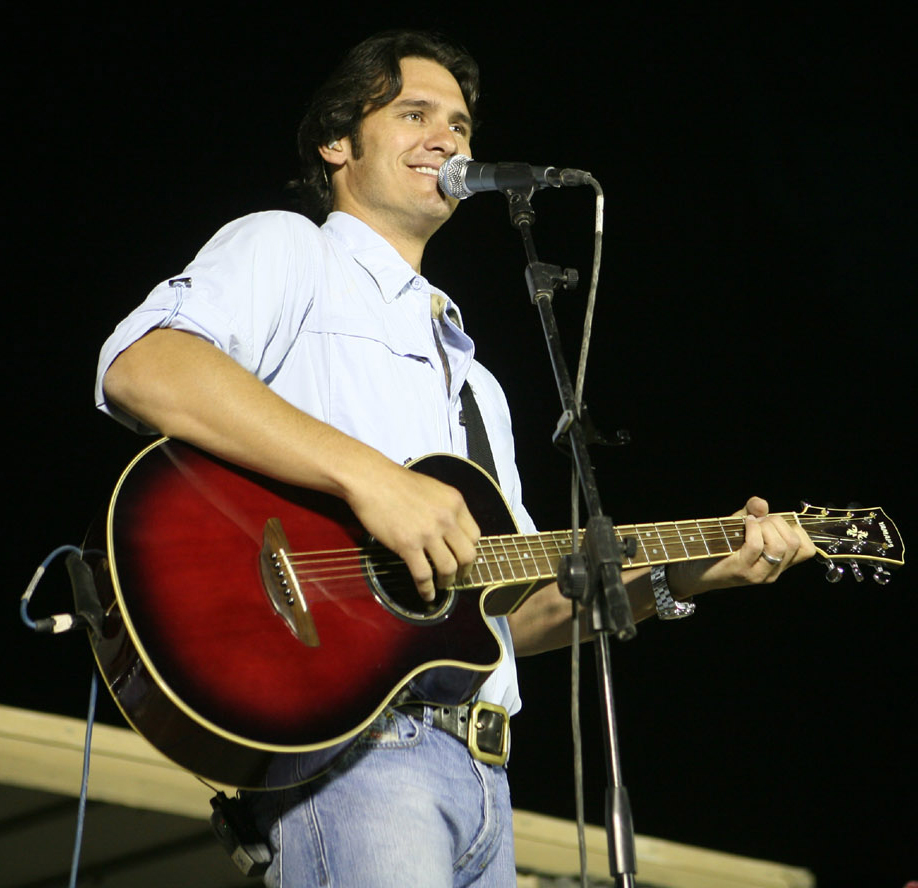
- Studio albums: 11
- Extended plays: 1
- Compilation albums: 1
- Singles: 32
- Music videos: 23
- No. 1 singles: 5

The discography of Joe Nichols, an American country music singer, consists of 32 singles and eleven studio albums.

At age 19, Nichols made his debut in 1996 with a self-titled album on the independent Intersound label. It was not until the release of his 2002 single "The Impossible" on the Universal South Records (now Show Dog-Universal Music) label that Nichols first reached the top 40 on the country charts. The single, which peaked at number three on the Billboard Hot Country Singles & Tracks (now Hot Country Songs) charts, was followed by the release of his platinum-certified second album, Man with a Memory, released in 2002. This album also produced the number-one single "Brokenheartsville".

Nichols followed up Man with a Memory in 2004 with Revelation (which included the Top Five hit "What's a Guy Gotta Do"), and a Christmas album, A Traditional Christmas. His fourth album, 2005's gold-certified III, produced the number one single "Tequila Makes Her Clothes Fall Off". Real Things followed in 2007, and Old Things New, which produced Nichols' third number one hit in "Gimmie That Girl", was released in 2009. Following the release of Old Things New, Nichols' label went through a merger to become Show-Dog Universal Music, through which he released his seventh album, It's All Good, in 2011. It produced only one chart single in "Take It Off" (which failed to reach the Top 20), and he parted ways with his label.

In late 2012, Nichols was signed to Red Bow Records as the flagship artist for the new label. Under Red Bow, Nichols released his eighth album, 2013's Crickets. The album produced two Number One hits in "Sunny and 75" and "Yeah". He released his ninth album, Never Gets Old, and his lone EP, Never Gets Old: Traditional Country Series, in 2017 and 2018, respectively, before being dropped from the label.

In 2021, Nichols signed with independent label Quartz Hill Records. In 2022, he released Good Day for Living, his first album for the label, which featured his first top-20 single, "Good Day for Living", since 2014's "Yeah". The record failed to chart. Like its predecessor, Nichols' eleventh album, Honky Tonks & Country Songs, failed to chart, but did feature "Better Than You", a duet with Annie Bosko, which peaked at 44.

== Studio albums ==
=== 1990s and 2000s ===
Title	Album details	Peak chart positions		Certifications (sales threshold)
Title	Album details	US	US Country	Certifications (sales threshold)
Joe Nichols (Note: Joe Nichols was re-released in 2002 as Six of One, Half Dozen of the Other, and again in 2003 as The Early Years.)	Release date: August 27, 1996; Label: Intersound; Formats: CD, cassette	—	—	
Man with a Memory	Release date: July 23, 2002; Label: Universal South; Formats: CD	72	9	RIAA: Platinum
Revelation	Release date: June 29, 2004; Label: Universal South; Formats: CD, music download	23	3	
III	Release date: October 25, 2005; Label: Universal South; Formats: CD, music download	7	2	RIAA: Gold
Real Things	Release date: August 21, 2007; Label: Universal South; Formats: CD, music download	23	2	
Old Things New	Release date: October 27, 2009; Label: Universal South; Formats: CD, music download	71	15	
"—" denotes releases that did not chart

=== 2010s–present ===
Title	Album details	Peak chart positions			Sales
Title	Album details	US	US Country	US Indie	Sales
It's All Good	Release date: November 8, 2011; Label: Show Dog-Universal Music; Formats: CD, music download	78	19	—	
Crickets	Release date: October 8, 2013; Label: Red Bow; Formats: CD, music download	17	3	4	
Never Gets Old	Release date: July 28, 2017; Label: Red Bow; Formats: CD, music download	120	15	6	US: 9,700
Good Day for Living	Release date: February 11, 2022; Label: Quartz Hill; Formats: CD, music download	—	—	—	
Honky Tonks & Country Songs	Release date: October 25, 2024; Label: Quartz Hill; Formats: CD, vinyl, music download	—	—	—	
"—" denotes releases that did not chart

== Christmas albums ==
Title	Album details	Peak chart positions	
Title	Album details	US Country	US Holiday
A Traditional Christmas	Release date: September 28, 2004; Label: Universal South Records; Formats: CD, music download	47	19

== Compilation albums ==
Title	Album details	Peak chart positions	
Title	Album details	US	US Country
Greatest Hits	Release date: January 25, 2011; Label: Show Dog-Universal Music; Formats: CD, music download	52	12

== Extended plays ==
Title	Album details
Never Gets Old: Traditional Country Series	Release date: August 31, 2018; Label: Red Bow; Formats: Music download

== Singles ==
=== 1990s ===
Year	Title	Peak positions	Album
Year	Title	CAN Country	Album
1996	"Six of One, Half a Dozen of the Other"	74	Joe Nichols
1996	"Wal-Mart Parking Lot Social Club"	—	Joe Nichols
1996	"To Tell You the Truth, I Lied"	—	Joe Nichols
1997	"I Hate the Way I Love You"	—	Joe Nichols
"—" denotes releases that did not chart

=== 2000s ===
Year	Title	Peak chart positions			Certifications (sales threshold)	Album
Year	Title	US	US Hot Country	CAN	Certifications (sales threshold)	Album
2002	"The Impossible"	29	3	—		Man with a Memory
2002	"Brokenheartsville"	27	1	—	RIAA: Platinum	Man with a Memory
2003	"She Only Smokes When She Drinks"	72	17	—		Man with a Memory
2003	"Cool to Be a Fool"	— (Note: "Cool to Be a Fool" did not enter the Hot 100, but peaked at number 6 on Bubbling Under Hot 100 Singles.)	18	—		Man with a Memory
2004	"If Nobody Believed in You"	68	10	—		Revelation
2004	"What's a Guy Gotta Do"	64	4	—		Revelation
2005	"Tequila Makes Her Clothes Fall Off"	32	1	—	RIAA: 3× Platinum	III
2006	"Size Matters (Someday)"	73	9	—		III
2006	"I'll Wait for You"	71	7	—	RIAA: Gold	III
2007	"Another Side of You"	99	17	—		Real Things
2007	"It Ain't No Crime"	— (Note: "It Ain't No Crime" did not enter the Hot 100, but peaked at number 5 on Bubbling Under Hot 100 Singles.)	16	—		Real Things
2009	"Believers"	—	26	—		Old Things New
2009	"Gimmie That Girl"	34	1	54	RIAA: Platinum	Old Things New
"—" denotes releases that did not chart

=== 2010s ===
Year	Title	Peak chart positions					Certifications (sales threshold)	Album
Year	Title	US	US Hot Country	US Country Airplay	CAN Country	CAN	Certifications (sales threshold)	Album
2010	"The Shape I'm In"	91	17		—	—		Old Things New
2011	"Take It Off"	— (Note: "Take It Off" did not enter the Hot 100, but peaked at number 22 on Bubbling Under Hot 100 Singles.)	25		—	—		It's All Good
2013	"Sunny and 75"	39	4	1	1	49	RIAA: Platinum	Crickets
2014	"Yeah"	41	7	1	1	48	RIAA: Platinum	Crickets
2014	"Hard to Be Cool"	—	32	22	50	—		Crickets
2015	"Freaks Like Me"	—	49	45	—	—		Non-album singles
2016	"Undone"	—	—	42	—	—		Non-album singles
2017	"Never Gets Old"	—	—	49	—	—		Never Gets Old
2018	"Billy Graham's Bible"	—	—	—	—	—		Never Gets Old
"—" denotes releases that did not chart

=== 2020s–present ===
Year	Title	Peak chart positions			Album
Year	Title	US Country Airplay	CAN Country	NZ Hot	Album
2021	"Home Run"	—	—	—	Good Day for Living
2022	"Good Day for Living"	18	36	—	Good Day for Living
2023	"Brokenhearted"	46	—	—	Good Day for Living
2024	"Better Than You" (with Annie Bosko)	44	—	—	Honky Tonks & Country Songs
2026	"Say La V"	46	—	35	TBD
"—" denotes releases that did not chart

== Other singles ==
=== Featured singles ===
Year	Title	Peak chart positions	Album
Year	Title	CAN Country	Album
2011	"I'll Try Anything" (Jasmine Rae featuring Joe Nichols)	—	Listen Here
2016	"Still Loving You" (Meghan Patrick featuring Joe Nichols)	10	Grace & Grit
"—" denotes releases that did not chart or was not released

=== Other charted songs ===
Year	Title	Peak positions	Album
Year	Title	US Country Airplay	Album
2005	"The Christmas Song"	60	A Traditional Christmas
2005	"Have Yourself a Merry Little Christmas"	57	A Traditional Christmas
2005	"I'll Be Home for Christmas"	56	A Traditional Christmas
2005	"Let It Snow! Let It Snow! Let It Snow!"	37	A Traditional Christmas

=== Promotional singles ===
Year	Title	Album
2018	"The Rose Is for Today"	Never Gets Old: Traditional Country Series
2018	"Sing Me Back Home"	Never Gets Old: Traditional Country Series
2018	"Good Ole Boys Like Me"	Never Gets Old: Traditional Country Series
2018	"There's No Gettin' Over Me"	Never Gets Old: Traditional Country Series
2018	"Ten Feet Away"	Never Gets Old: Traditional Country Series
2018	"Choices"	Never Gets Old: Traditional Country Series
2021	"I Wanna Be Your Tonight"	Good Day for Living
2021	"Screened In"	Good Day for Living
2024	"Bottle It Up"	Honky Tonks & Country Songs
2024	"Doin' Life with You"	Honky Tonks & Country Songs
2025	"Goodbyes Are Hard to Listen To"	TBD
2026	"Fighting the Good Fight"	TBD
2026	"High Notes"	TBD

== Other appearances ==
Year	Title	Other artist(s)	Album
2005	"If I Were a Carpenter"	Dolly Parton	Those Were the Days
2007	"In a Perfect World"	Gene Watson	In a Perfect World
2010	"She Ain't Too Good for That"	Colt Ford	Chicken & Biscuits
2011	"Mr. Bojangles"	The Grascals	Country Classics with a Bluegrass Spin
2011	"I'll Try Anything"	Jasmine Rae	Listen Here
2013	"Tonight I'm Playin' Possum"	Randy Travis	Influence Vol. 1: The Man I Am
2014	"Red Dress"	Lucy Hale	Road Between
2016	"Still Loving You"	Meghan Patrick	Grace & Grit
2022	"Lost and Found"	Dolly Parton	Run, Rose, Run
2025	"Better Than You"	Annie Bosko	California Cowgirl

== Music videos ==
Year	Title	Director
1996	"Six of One, Half a Dozen of the Other"	Tom Bevins
1996	"Wal-Mart Parking Lot Social Club"	Tom Bevins
1996	"To Tell You the Truth, I Lied"	Tom Bevins
1997	"I Hate the Way I Love You"	Tom Bevins
2002	"The Impossible"	Eric Welch
2002	"Brokenheartsville"	Trey Fanjoy
2003	"She Only Smokes When She Drinks"	Morgan Lawley
2003	"Cool to Be a Fool"	Peter Zavadil
2004	"If Nobody Believed in You"	Trey Fanjoy
2005	"What's a Guy Gotta Do"	Peter Zavadil
2005	"Tequila Makes Her Clothes Fall Off"	Stephen Shepherd
2006	"Size Matters (Someday)"	Warren P. Sonoda
2006	"I'll Wait for You"	Warren P. Sonoda
2007	"I'll Wait for You" (acoustic version)	Chris Hicky
2007	"Another Side of You"	Chris Hicky
2008	"It Ain't No Crime"	Kristin Barlowe
2009	"An Old Friend of Mine"	Rob Dennis
2009	"Gimmie That Girl"	Peter Zavadil
2011	"The Shape I'm In"	Trey Fanjoy
2011	"Take It Off"	Potsy Ponciroli/Deaton-Flanigen
2013	"Sunny and 75"	Brian Lazzaro
2014	"Yeah"	Wes Edwards
2017	"Baby Got Back"	Jim Shea
2023	"Good Day for Living"	
2025	"Home Run"	David "Doc" Abbott
2025	"Better Than You" (featuring Annie Bosko)	
