= Never Gets Old (song) =

Single by Joe Nichols

from the album Never Gets Old
- Released: July 17, 2017
- Genre: Country
- Length: 3:37
- Label: Red Bow
- Songwriters: Connie Harrington; Steve Moakler
- Producer: Brent Rowan

Joe Nichols singles chronology
"Undone" (2016)	"Never Gets Old" (2017)	"Billy Graham's Bible" (2018)

"Never Gets Old" is a song recorded by American country music artist Joe Nichols. It was released as the lead single and title track from his ninth studio album of the same name on July 17, 2017, via Red Bow Records. The song was co-written by Connie Harrington and Steve Moakler.

The song followed two singles, "Freaks Like Me" and "Undone", which were intended as the first and second singles for his then-unannounced ninth album, but were eventually not included after the album was reworked.

== History ==
Following the poor performances of "Freaks Like Me" and "Undone", Nichols reworked his ninth studio album, Never Gets Old, and released the album's title track as the album's lead single instead.

The song was co-written by Connie Harrington and Steve Moakler. Harrington and Nichols previously collaborated, as she co-wrote "She Only Smokes When She Drinks" in 2003. Despite the majority of the record and Nichols' previous two singles being produced by Mickey Jack Cones, "Never Gets Old" and album cut "Diamonds Make Babies" were produced by Brent Rowan, whom Nichols previously worked with for 2009's Old Things New.

== Content ==
Perri O. Blumberg of Rolling Stone described the song as a "heartfelt ballad."

Nichols described the song as a throwback, stating, "I tried to round this album out with what my first album was like—traditional country, what got me started, what I love, what I'm passionate about."

== Critical reception ==
Billy Dukes of Taste of Country critiqued the song's lyrics but praised Nichols' delivery. In a five out a five star review, Markos Papadatos of Digital Journal called Nichols "exceptional" and said that his "rich, baritone vocals...are reminiscent of the late Merle Haggard meets Don Williams."

== Chart performance ==
The song has peaked at 49 on the Country Airplay chart, his third consecutive single to miss the top 40, and his lowest charting effort since 1997.

Chart (2017–18)	Peak position
US Country Airplay (Billboard)	49
