= Undone =

Undone may refer to:

== Literature ==
- Undone (Colapinto novel), a 2015 novel by John Colapinto
- Undone (Humphreys novel), a 2013 Amoveo Legend novel by Sara Humphreys
- Undone (Slaughter novel), a 2009 Will Trent and Grand County novel by Karin Slaughter
- Undone (short story collection), a 1993 children's book by Paul Jennings

== Music ==
=== Albums ===
- Undone (Brian & Jenn Johnson album) or the title song, 2001
- Undone (MercyMe album) or the title song, 2004
- Undone, by T. Duggins of the Tossers, 2006

=== Songs ===
- "Undone" (Stellar song), 1999
- "Undone – The Sweater Song", by Weezer, 1994
- "Undone", by All That Remains from Overcome, 2008
- "Undone," by Backstreet Boys from This Is Us, 2009
- "Undone", by Blondie from The Curse of Blondie, 2003
- "Undone", by Dean Brody from Dean Brody, 2009
- "Undone", by DeVotchKa from A Mad & Faithful Telling, 2008
- "Undone", by Failure from Magnified, 1994
- "Undone", by Five Finger Death Punch from War Is the Answer, 2009
- "Undone", by Haley Reinhart from Listen Up!, 2012
- "Undone", by Joe Nichols, 2016
- "Undone", by Lifehouse from Lifehouse, 2005
- "Undone", by No Doubt from Push and Shove, 2012
- "Undone", by Pearl Jam, a B-side of the single "I Am Mine", 2002
- "Undone", by Sara Groves from The Other Side of Something, 2004

== Other uses ==
- Undone (podcast), a 2016–2017 podcast produced by Gimlet Media
- Undone (radio series), a 2006–2010 British science fiction comedy series
- UNDONE (tag), a tag in a comment in programming
- Undone (TV series), a 2019–2022 American animated series
- Across the Line (2015 film) (working title Undone), a Canadian drama

== See also ==
- Come Undone (disambiguation)
- Undun (disambiguation)
