= Say La V =

2026 song by Joe Nichols

Single by Joe Nichols
- Written: March 2026
- Released: July 20, 2026
- Genre: Country
- Length: 3:37 (radio edit); 3:47 (album version)
- Label: Quartz Hill
- Songwriters: Lance Miller; Jason Sellers; Brett Warren
- Producers: Joe Nichols; Jason Sellers

Joe Nichols singles chronology
"Better Than You" (2024)	"Say La V" (2026)

Lyric video
- "Say La V" on YouTube

"Say La V" is a song by American country music singer Joe Nichols. The song was released on July 20, 2026, via Quartz Hill Records as the lead single from his upcoming twelfth studio album. The song was co-written by Lance Miller, Jason Sellers, and Brett Warren, and co-produced by Nichols and Sellers.

== Background ==
Nichols co-wrote and co-produced "Say La V" with Jason Sellers, whom he previously collaborated with on the number one single "Sunny and 75" in 2013. Lance Miller and Brett Warren also co-wrote the track. The trio used Suno and its generative artificial intelligence to make the demo, but Nichols stated that he took the "core of the song and rebuilt it more organically."

The songwriting process began in March 2026, with the songwriters playing around with the French phrase "C'est la vie". The song features a more pop sound, which Nichols admitted he didn't initially think he could record, but ultimately decided it could be a hit. The song's horn section used Neil Diamond's "Sweet Caroline" as a reference.

"Say La V" serves as a standout on his upcoming twelfth album, which is supposed to be loosely conceptual, akin to Willie Nelson's Red Headed Stranger, which added to its appeal as a single release.

The song's title, "Say La V", plays on familiar wordplay that throws back to Nichols' first Billboard Hot Country Songs number one, "Brokenheartsville".

== Commercial performance and critical reception ==
In its debut week, "Say La V" received the most adds of the week with 38, which was Nichols largest career add date and his third time leading the Add Board for Country Aircheck/Mediabase in his career, with the previous coming in January 2008 with "It Ain't No Crime". It debuted at number 59 on the Billboard Country Airplay chart dated September 12, 2026.

Music journalist Robert K. Oermann of MusicRow praised the song, stating that "Nichols sings the tongue-in-cheek ditty like a honky-tonky angel." James Daykin of Entertainment Focus called the song's hook "instantly memorable."

== Track listing ==
Digital single

1. "Say La V" – 3:47
2. "High Notes" – 3:30
3. "Goodbyes Are Hard to Listen To" – 3:40

== Personnel ==
Credits adapted from Tidal.

=== Musicians ===
- Joe Nichols – lead vocals
- Jason Sellers – background vocals, bass
- Lance Miller – background vocals
- Kalisa Ewing – background vocals
- Sol Philcox – electric guitar
- Ilya Toshinskiy – acoustic guitar
- Emmanuel Echem – trumpet
- Roy Agee – trombone
- Evan Cobb – saxophone
- Jerry Roe – drums
- Dave Dorn – keyboards
- Dave Cohen – keyboard synth

=== Technical ===
- Joe Nichols – production
- Jason Sellers – production
- Adam Ayan – mastering
- Derek Bason – mixing, recording
- Todd Tidwell – assistant engineering
- Greg Strizek – additional engineer

== Charts ==
Chart performance for "Say La V"
Chart (2026)	Peak position
New Zealand Hot Singles (RMNZ)	35
US Country Airplay (Billboard)	46

== Release history ==
Release dates and formats for "Say La V"
Region	Date	Format(s)	Label(s)	Ref.
Various	July 17, 2026	Digital streaming	Quartz Hill	
United States	July 20, 2026	Country radio	Quartz Hill	
