= Undone (Joe Nichols song) =

Single by Joe Nichols
- Released: June 6, 2016
- Genre: Country
- Length: 3:21
- Label: Red Bow
- Songwriters: Ross Copperman; Josh Osborne; Trevor Rosen
- Producer: Mickey Jack Cones

Joe Nichols singles chronology
"Freaks Like Me" (2015)	"Undone" (2016)	"Never Gets Old" (2017)

"Undone" is a song recorded by American country music artist Joe Nichols. It was released digitally on May 13, 2016, and to radio on June 6, 2016, as his fifth single for Red Bow Records. The song was co-written by Ross Copperman, Josh Osborne, and Trevor Rosen.

The song was intended for a then-unannounced upcoming album, which was intended for late 2016, but the album was never released. In 2017, it was not featured on his eventual ninth album, Never Gets Old.

== History ==
The song was co-written by Ross Copperman, Josh Osborne, and Trevor Rosen, and was produced by Mickey Jack Cones, the producer for Nichols two previous number one hits, "Yeah" and "Sunny and 75". The song was released digitally on May 13, 2016, and to radio on June 6, 2016.

The song, alongside 2015's "Freaks Like Me", was meant to be included on the follow-up to 2013's Crickets, a then-unannounced album intended for late 2016, but the album was never released. Instead, Nichols released Never Gets Old in 2017, which did not include "Freaks Like Me" or "Undone" due to the singles' poor performance.

Nichols released the lyric video alongside the song's debut on country radio in June 2016.

== Content ==
The song served as a "steamy change of pace" compared to Nichols' previous release, "Freaks Like Me". The song was to appeal to his upcoming album's "sexy side."

Nichols described the song and working with producer Cones, "He has done a great job capturing the song's energy and its intensity. It is a ballad, but it feels like it wants to take off. The message is a little suggestive..."

== Critical reception ==
Upon hitting country radio, "Undone" was among the top three most-added songs on US country radio with 30 first-week stations.

Digital Journal's Markos Papadatos gave the song five out of five stars, claiming that "it is certain to fare well in a live setting with his fans, especially his female fan-base."

== Chart performance ==
The song has peaked at 42 on the Country Airplay chart, his second consecutive single to miss the top 40.

Chart (2016)	Peak position
US Country Airplay (Billboard)	42
