= Home Run (Joe Nichols song) =

Single by Joe Nichols

from the album Good Day for Living
- Released: May 10, 2021
- Genre: Country
- Length: 3:05
- Label: Quartz Hill
- Songwriters: Ross Copperman; Dallas Davidson; Ashley Gorley
- Producers: Mickey Jack Cones; Derek George

Joe Nichols singles chronology
"Billy Graham's Bible" (2018)	"Home Run" (2021)	"Good Day for Living" (2022)

"Home Run" is a song recorded by American country music artist Joe Nichols. It was released as the lead single from his tenth album Good Day for Living on May 10, 2021, via Quartz Hill Records. The song was co-written by Ross Copperman, Dallas Davidson, and Ashley Gorley.

== History ==
"Home Run" was co-written by Ross Copperman, Dallas Davidson, and Ashley Gorley, with Copperman describing the song as "going home and getting your soul right". Nichols said, "It's more than a great hook; it's a great message, too".

Nichols also reunited with producers Mickey Jack Cones and Derek George, with whom he worked alongside for Crickets, which produced two number-one singles, "Sunny and 75" and "Yeah".

"Home Run" was Nichols' first single release in nearly three years since 2018's "Billy Graham's Bible". It was also his first release for his new label, Quartz Hill Records, after being dropped by Broken Bow in 2018.

== Content ==
American Songwriter described "Home Run" as highlighting "the healing power of home. Amidst the chaos of a fast-paced digital world, the lyrics detail 'touching base' with old feelings, friends, and places that once held significant meaning—revisiting the past to reframe memories."

== Music video ==
The music video premiered on November 15, 2021, and featured Nichols, his wife, their two daughters, and Nichol's wife and sister. It was directed by David "Doc" Abbott.
