= Cool to Be a Fool =

Single by Joe Nichols

from the album Man with a Memory
- B-side: "She Only Smokes When She Drinks"
- Released: September 8, 2003
- Recorded: 2002
- Genre: Country
- Label: Universal South
- Songwriters: Joe Nichols, Steve Dean, Wil Nance
- Producer: Brent Rowan

Joe Nichols singles chronology
"She Only Smokes When She Drinks" (2003)	"Cool to Be a Fool" (2003)	"If Nobody Believed in You" (2004)

"Cool to Be a Fool" is a song by American country music artist Joe Nichols. It was released in September 2003 as the fourth and final single from his second studio album Man with a Memory. The song reached number 18 on the U.S. Billboard Hot Country Singles & Tracks chart. Nichols wrote this song with Steve Dean and Wil Nance.

== Chart performance ==
Chart (2003–2004)	Peak position
US Hot Country Songs (Billboard)	18
US Bubbling Under Hot 100 (Billboard)	6
