= A Traditional Christmas =

2004 album by Joe Nichols

Studio album by Joe Nichols
- Released: September 28, 2004
- Recorded: May 2004
- Genre: Country
- Label: Universal South
- Producer: Brent Rowan

Joe Nichols chronology
Revelation (2004)	A Traditional Christmas (2004)	III (2005)

Professional ratings
Review scores
Source	Rating
Allmusic	3/5 stars

A Traditional Christmas is a Christmas album by country music artist Joe Nichols. It was released in 2004 on Show Dog-Universal Music. The record is Nichols' first album of Christmas music, and was also his second release in the year 2004. It consists of ten renditions of traditional Christmas tunes.

== Track listing ==
No.	Title	Writer(s)	Length
1.	"Let It Snow! Let It Snow! Let It Snow!"	Sammy Cahn, Jule Styne	2:10
2.	"Away in a Manger"	Traditional	2:50
3.	"I'll Be Home for Christmas"	Kim Gannon, Walter Kent, Buck Ram	2:06
4.	"Silent Night"	Traditional	3:37
5.	"White Christmas"	Irving Berlin	3:11
6.	"Silver Bells"	Ray Evans, Jay Livingston	3:23
7.	"Winter Wonderland"	Felix Bernard, Richard B. Smith	3:03
8.	"O Holy Night"	Traditional	3:35
9.	"Have Yourself a Merry Little Christmas"	Ralph Blane, Hugh Martin	4:23
10.	"The Christmas Song"	Mel Tormé, Bob Wells	3:01

2011 digital re-release
No.	Title	Writer(s)	Length
11.	"Old Toy Trains"	Roger Miller	2:15

== Personnel ==
- Lisa Cochran - background vocals
- Shannon Forrest - drums
- Wes Hightower - background vocals
- Jim Hoke - accordion, autoharp, clarinet, harmonica, recorder, soprano saxophone, tin whistle
- David Hungate - upright bass
- Gordon Mote - organ, piano, synthesizer
- Joe Nichols - lead vocals
- Brent Rowan - electric guitar, keyboards
- Bryan Sutton - acoustic guitar, hi-string guitar, soloist

== Chart performance ==
Chart (2004)	Peak position
U.S. Billboard Top Country Albums	47
U.S. Billboard Top Holiday Albums	19
