= If Nobody Believed in You =

2004 single by Joe Nichols

Single by Joe Nichols

from the album Revelation
- B-side: "The Shade"
- Released: March 22, 2004
- Genre: Country
- Length: 3:56
- Label: Universal South
- Songwriter: Harley Allen
- Producer: Brent Rowan

Joe Nichols singles chronology
"Cool to Be a Fool" (2003)	"If Nobody Believed in You" (2004)	"What's a Guy Gotta Do" (2004)

"If Nobody Believed in You" is a song written by Harley Allen and recorded by American country music artist Joe Nichols. It was released in March 2004 as the first single from his 2004 album Revelation. The song peaked at number 10 on the U.S. Billboard Hot Country Songs chart.

== Content ==
The first two verses deal with the emotional harm insensitive people cause others, the third references those who try to keep religion out of public schools. "I believe that people have to have a belief in something," Nichols says, "whether it be God or whatever their religion. ... I think people get into a political war over simple words, and they miss the forest for the trees. ... The premise of the song is that we all need to believe in something -- in each other and, especially, God. It's just our opinion. We didn't mean to get too political or anything like that or make a podium out of the song. Some people aren't going to agree with us, but that's OK, too."

== Music video ==
The music video was directed by Trey Fanjoy and premiered in June 2004.

== Chart performance ==
"If Nobody Believed in You" debuted at number 60 on the U.S. Billboard Hot Country Singles & Tracks for the week of March 27, 2004.

Chart (2004)	Peak position
US Billboard Hot 100	68
US Hot Country Songs (Billboard)	10

=== Year-end charts ===
Chart (2004)	Position
US Country Songs (Billboard)	26
