= Good Day for Living =

Single by Joe Nichols

from the album Good Day for Living
- Released: January 31, 2022
- Genre: Country
- Length: 3:10
- Label: Quartz Hill
- Songwriters: Dave Cohen; Bobby Hamrick; Neil Mason
- Producers: Mickey Jack Cones; Derek George

Joe Nichols singles chronology
"Home Run" (2021)	"Good Day for Living" (2022)	"Brokenhearted" (2023)

"Good Day for Living" is a song recorded by American country music artist Joe Nichols. It was released as the second single from his tenth studio album of the same name in January 2022. It was written by Dave Cohen, Bobby Hamrick, and Neil Mason.

== Commercial performance ==
The song reached a peak of number 18 on the Billboard Country Airplay chart dated April 29, 2023, becoming Nichols' first top 20 hit since "Yeah" in 2014.

== Charts ==
=== Weekly charts ===
Weekly chart performance for "Good Day for Living"
Chart (2022–2023)	Peak position
Canada Country (Billboard)	36
US Country Airplay (Billboard)	18

=== Year-end charts ===
Year-end chart performance for "Good Day for Living"
Chart (2023)	Position
US Country Airplay (Billboard)	53
