= Brokenhearted (William Michael Morgan song) =

2018 single by William Michael Morgan

Promotional single by William Michael Morgan
- Released: October 26, 2018
- Genre: Country
- Length: 3:10
- Label: Sony
- Songwriters: Rhett Akins; Marv Green; J. T. Harding
- Producers: Scott Hendricks; Jimmy Ritchey

William Michael Morgan singles chronology
"Tonight Girl" (2018)	"Brokenhearted" (2018)	"Talking to a Girl" (2018)

"Brokenhearted" is a song recorded by American country music artist William Michael Morgan. It was released as a standalone promotional single on October 26, 2018, via Sony Music. The song was co-written by Rhett Akins, Marv Green, and J. T. Harding.

American country music artist Joe Nichols recorded and released the song on June 19, 2023, as the third and final single from his tenth studio album, Good Day for Living. The song served as the follow-up to the album's title track, which saw Nichols return to the top 20 on the charts for the first time since 2014.

== History ==
"Brokenhearted" was co-written by Rhett Akins, Marv Green, and J. T. Harding at Green's office in 2018. Country band Midland and Tim McGraw almost recorded their own versions, but it was eventually scrapped.

The song was the second collaboration between Morgan and Akins, as Akins also co-wrote "Missing".

The music video was directed by Colin Duffy.

== Content ==
The song is a mid-tempo, easygoing track that describes how country music as a genre has "abandoned the kind of heartbreak and hard times songs that once formed its backbone for lyrics about endless good times and fun."

== Joe Nichols version ==
"Brokenhearted"

Single by Joe Nichols

from the album Good Day for Living
- Released: June 19, 2023
- Recorded: January 2021
- Genre: Country
- Length: 3:13
- Label: Quartz Hill
- Songwriters: Rhett Akins; Marv Green; J. T. Harding
- Producers: Mickey Jack Cones; Derek George

Joe Nichols singles chronology
"Good Day for Living" (2022)	"Brokenhearted" (2023)	"Better Than You" (2024)

The song, and the album as a whole, were an attempt to return to a more traditional country sound.

Nichols described "Brokenhearted" as a satirical song that disguises "a sad country song with a danceable beat," akin to Nichols' 2002 hit, "Brokenheartsville". He also said the song was difficult to sing, due to there not being a lot of space to breathe.

Nichols described the reaction to the song as "everything you would want, and more. People really reacted to it."

=== Chart performance ===
Chart (2023)	Peak position
US Country Airplay (Billboard)	46
