= Real Things (Joe Nichols album) =

Studio album by Joe Nichols
- Released: August 21, 2007
- Recorded: 2007 at The Sound Kitchen, Curb Studios and Studio 44, Nashville, TN
- Genre: Country
- Length: 47:24
- Label: Universal South Records
- Producers: Brent Rowan; Mark Wright

Joe Nichols chronology
III (2005)	Real Things (2007)	Old Things New (2009)

Singles from Real Things
- 1. "Another Side of You" Released: May 7, 2007; 2. "It Ain't No Crime" Released: December 13, 2007

Professional ratings
Review scores
Source	Rating
Allmusic	4/5 stars
Entertainment Weekly	A−

Real Things is the fifth studio album by American country music artist Joe Nichols. It was released on August 21, 2007 by Universal South Records. It produced two singles on the US Billboard Hot Country Songs charts with "Another Side of You", which peaked at number 17, and "It Ain't No Crime", which reached number 16.

This album also contains four songs that were previously recorded by other artists. "She's All Lady" was previously recorded by Jamey Johnson on his 2006 debut The Dollar, and "Ain't Nobody Gonna Take That from Me" was previously recorded by Collin Raye on his 2001 album Can't Back Down. "Let's Get Drunk and Fight" was recorded by Aaron Lines on his 2007 album Moments That Matter, from which it was released as a single. Finally, "If I Could Only Fly" is a cover of a Blaze Foley song. "Who Are You When I'm Not Looking" was recorded by Blake Shelton on his album All About Tonight and was released as the second single from that album.

Brent Rowan produced the entire album, working with Mark Wright on all tracks except "Ain't Nobody Gonna Take That from Me" and "If I Could Only Fly".

== Track listing ==
No.	Title	Writer(s)	Length
1.	"Real Things"	John Brown; Billy Dean	3:08
2.	"Another Side of You"	Carson Chamberlain; Jamey Johnson	3:00
3.	"Who Are You When I'm Not Looking"	Earl Bud Lee; John Wayne Wiggins	3:06
4.	"Comin' Back in a Cadillac"	Ben Daniels; Clint Daniels; Lynn Hutton; Rob McNelley	3:40
5.	"My Whiskey Years"	Tom Hambridge; Jeffrey Steele	3:59
6.	"It Ain't No Crime"	Tony Martin; Mark Nesler; Tom Shapiro	3:37
7.	"All Good Things"	Dean Dillon; Scotty Emerick	3:05
8.	"Let's Get Drunk and Fight"	Chris Lindsey; Aaron Lines; Aimee Mayo; Troy Verges	4:03
9.	"Ain't Nobody Gonna Take That from Me"	Rivers Rutherford; Sam Tate; Annie Tate	3:57
10.	"She's All Lady"	Dallas Davidson; Johnson	3:44
11.	"The Difference Is Night and Day"	Joe Nichols; Walt Aldridge; John Paul White	3:12
12.	"All I Need Is a Heart"	Emerick; John Scott Sherrill	3:45
13.	"If I Could Only Fly" (with Lee Ann Womack)	Blaze Foley	4:59
Total length:			47:15

== Personnel ==
Amalgamated from liner notes

- Perry Coleman - background vocals on "Comin' Back in a Cadillac" and "It Ain't No Crime"
- J. T. Corenflos - electric guitar
- Eric Darken - percussion
- Shannon Forrest - drums
- Paul Franklin - steel guitar, Dobro
- Morgane Hayes - background vocals on track 6 and additional background vocals on tracks 5, 8, 11 & 13
- Aubrey Haynie - fiddle, mandolin
- Wes Hightower - background vocals
- Jim Hoke - horns on "Comin' Back in a Cadillac"
- John Hughey - steel guitar on track 13
- David Hungate - bass guitar, upright bass
- Mac McAnally - acoustic guitar, reso-electric guitar
- Gordon Mote - piano, Wurlitzer, Fender Rhodes, B3 organ
- Joe Nichols - lead vocals, background vocals on tracks 11 & 12
- Brent Rowan - acoustic guitar, electric guitar, Tic tac bass, Wurlitzer, horn arrangement, slide guitar, mellotron, sitar, 6 string bass, 12 string acoustic guitar, piano, harmonium
- Bryan Sutton - acoustic guitar, mandolin, mandocello
- Lee Ann Womack - duet vocals on track 13
- Craig Young - bass guitar on track 9 & 13

Universal Records South Family Singers sing on "Let's Get Drunk and Fight"

== Chart performance ==
=== Album ===
Chart (2007)	Peak position
US Billboard 200	23
US Top Country Albums (Billboard)	2

=== Singles ===
Year	Single	Peak chart positions	
Year	Single	US Country	US
2007	"Another Side of You"	17	99
2007	"It Ain't No Crime"	16	105
