= What's a Guy Gotta Do =

Single by Joe Nichols

from the album Revelation
- Released: November 8, 2004
- Recorded: 2004
- Genre: Country
- Length: 2:22
- Label: Universal South
- Songwriters: Don Sampson; Joe Nichols; Kelley Lovelace
- Producer: Brent Rowan

Joe Nichols singles chronology
"If Nobody Believed in You" (2004)	"What's a Guy Gotta Do" (2004)	"Tequila Makes Her Clothes Fall Off" (2005)

"What's a Guy Gotta Do" is a song co-written and recorded by American country music artist Joe Nichols. It was released in November 2004 as the second and final single from his 2004 album Revelation. The song peaked at number 4 on the US Billboard Hot Country Songs chart and number 64 on the Billboard Hot 100. Nichols wrote this song with Kelley Lovelace and Don Sampson.

== Content ==
The song is an up-tempo in which the narrator asks himself, "what's a guy gotta do to get a girl in this town?"

== Music video ==
The music video was directed by Peter Zavadil, and features a man who tries unsuccessfully to get a girlfriend, from being maced in the eyes to getting arrested for being accused of harassment at Wal-Mart. The video was shot on December 2, 2004 in Bowling Green, Kentucky.

== Chart performance ==
"What's a Guy Gotta Do" debuted at number 55 on the U.S. Billboard Hot Country Singles & Tracks for the week of November 20, 2004.

Chart (2004–2005)	Peak position
US Billboard Hot 100	64
US Hot Country Songs (Billboard)	4

=== Year-end charts ===
Chart (2005)	Position
US Country Songs (Billboard)	21
