= III (Joe Nichols album) =

Studio album by Joe Nichols
- Released: October 25, 2005
- Genre: Country
- Length: 36:59
- Label: Universal South Records
- Producer: Buddy Cannon, Byron Gallimore, Brent Rowan

Joe Nichols chronology
A Traditional Christmas (2004)	III (2005)	Real Things (2007)

Singles from III
- 1. "Tequila Makes Her Clothes Fall Off" Released: August 1, 2005; 2. "Size Matters (Someday)" Released: January 24, 2006; 3. "I'll Wait for You" Released: July 31, 2006

Professional ratings
Review scores
Source	Rating
Allmusic	4/5 stars

III is the fourth studio album by American country music artist Joe Nichols. It was released on October 25, 2005 by Universal South Records. The album produced Nichols' second #1 hit in "Tequila Makes Her Clothes Fall Off", as well as the top-10 hits "Size Matters (Someday)" and "I'll Wait for You". Overall, it was certified gold by the RIAA for sales of well over 500,000 copies.

"My Old Friend the Blues" is a cover of a Steve Earle song. Also included is "Should I Come Home (Or Should I Go Crazy)", a cover of a Gene Watson hit single.

Brent Rowan produced the album except for the three singles, which were produced by Buddy Cannon, and "Freedom Feels Like Lonely" and "As Country as She Gets", which were produced by Byron Gallimore.

== Track listing ==
No.	Title	Writer(s)	Length
1.	"Size Matters (Someday)"	Mike Dekle; Byron Hill	2:51
2.	"Freedom Feels Like Lonely"	Billy Currington; Tony Martin; Mark Nesler	3:10
3.	"Tequila Makes Her Clothes Fall Off"	Gary Hannan; John Wayne Wiggins	3:07
4.	"Talk Me Out of Tampa"	Casey Beathard; Don Sampson	3:58
5.	"That's What Love'll Get You"	Carson Chamberlain; Mark D. Sanders	2:55
6.	"I'll Wait for You"	Harley Allen; Bill Anderson	4:07
7.	"Should I Come Home (Or Should I Go Crazy)"	Joe Allen	2:43
8.	"My Old Friend the Blues"	Steve Earle	3:08
9.	"As Country as She Gets"	Jim Collins; Martin; Wendell Mobley	3:41
10.	"Honky Tonk Girl"	Joe Nichols; Steve Dean; Wil Nance	2:46
11.	"Just a Little More"	Nichols; Donny Lowery	4:26

== Personnel ==
Adapted from AllMusic:

- Wyatt Beard - backing vocals
- Tom Bukovac - electric guitar
- Terry Crisp - pedal steel guitar
- Chad Cromwell - drums
- Dan Dugmore - pedal steel guitar
- Stuart Duncan - fiddle
- Shannon Forrest - drums, percussion
- Larry Franklin - fiddle
- Paul Franklin - pedal steel guitar
- Steve Gibson - acoustic guitar, electric guitar
- Kenny Greenberg - electric guitar
- Rob Hajacos - fiddle
- Morgane Hayes - backing vocals
- Aubrey Haynie - fiddle
- Wes Hightower - backing vocals
- John Hobbs - piano, Wurlitzer
- David Hungate - bass guitar
- Kirk "Jelly Roll" Johnson - harmonica
- Tim Lauer - pump organ
- B. James Lowry - acoustic guitar, resonator guitar
- Gary Lunn - bass guitar
- Liana Manis - backing vocals
- Brent Mason - electric guitar
- Randy McCormick - keyboards, Hammond organ, piano
- Gordon Mote - Fender Rhodes, Hammond organ, piano, Wurlitzer
- Steve Nathan - Hammond organ, piano
- Larry Paxton - bass guitar
- Al Perkins - pedal steel guitar
- Brent Rowan - bass guitar, acoustic guitar, electric guitar, keyboards
- Bryan Sutton - acoustic guitar, mandolin
- Russell Terrell - backing vocals
- Robby Turner - pedal steel guitar
- Joe Nichols - lead vocals, background vocals

== Charts ==
=== Weekly charts ===
Chart (2005)	Peak position
US Billboard 200	7
US Top Country Albums (Billboard)	2

=== Year-end charts ===
Chart (2006)	Position
US Billboard 200	187
US Top Country Albums (Billboard)	33
Chart (2007)	Position
US Top Country Albums (Billboard)	55

=== Singles ===
Year	Single	Peak chart positions	
Year	Single	US Country	US
2005	"Tequila Makes Her Clothes Fall Off"	1	32
2006	"Size Matters (Someday)"	9	73
2006	"I'll Wait for You"	7	71

== Certifications ==
Region	Certification
United States (RIAA)	Gold
