= Good Day for Living (album) =

Studio album by Joe Nichols
- Released: February 11, 2022
- Studios: Backstage (Nashville); Omni (Nashville); Blackbird (Nashville); The Monostary (Brentwood) (Note: Additional recording); The Conederosa (College Grove)
- Genre: Country
- Length: 42:01
- Label: Quartz Hill
- Producers: Mickey Jack Cones; Derek George

Joe Nichols chronology
Never Gets Old (2017)	Good Day for Living (2022)	Honky Tonks & Country Songs (2024)

Singles from Good Day for Living
- 1. "Home Run" Released: May 10, 2021; 2. "Good Day for Living" Released: January 31, 2022; 3. "Brokenhearted" Released: June 19, 2023

Good Day for Living is the tenth studio album by American country music artist Joe Nichols. It was released on February 11, 2022, via Quartz Hill. Three singles have been released from the album, including its title track, which became Nichols' first top 20 hit on the Billboard Country Airplay chart since 2014.

== Content ==
The 13-track album was co-produced by longtime collaborators Mickey Jack Cones and Derek George, who previously worked with Nichols on his 2013 album, Crickets. Good Day for Living was recorded during the COVID-19 pandemic, which allowed Nichols to take his time with the record while on a break from touring: "For the first time in a long time, I didn't feel any pressure. I'm the type of person who's always striving for more, but I've reached a place where I'm grateful for everything I've accomplished so far. It's been such a good run. I feel at peace, and that has freed me up to make new music that's very honest". It marked his first release under Quartz Hill Records, and Nichols credited label head Benny Brown for his intuition on some of the song selection for the record.

"Home Run" was released as the album's lead single on May 10, 2021, and was a major influence in Nichols' initial decision to sign to Quartz Hill. "Good Day for Living" and "Brokenhearted" were issued as the album's second and third singles, respectively, and both charted on the Billboard Country Airplay chart, with the former becoming a top 20 hit.

The album includes a collaboration with Blake Shelton on "I Got Friends That Do". It also features several songs previously recorded by other artists: "She Was" by Mark Chesnutt for his 2002 self-titled album, "Brokenhearted" by William Michael Morgan in 2018, "Hawaii on Me" by Chris Janson for his 2019 album, Real Friends, and "Reckon" and "Why Can't She" by Adam Craig in 2016 and 2018, respectively.

Nichols toured in support of the album on the Good Day for Living 2022 Tour, which commenced on February 12 in Jackson, Mississippi, and ended in September after 26 dates.

== Critical reception ==
Matt Bjorke of Roughstock spoke favorably of the album's melodies and production choices, and highlighted the diversity in material across the project, while comparing Nichols' vocals at times to Ronnie Milsap and Gene Watson.

== Track listing ==
Good Day for Living track listing
No.	Title	Writer(s)	Length
1.	"Brokenhearted"	Rhett Akins; Marv Green; J. T. Harding	3:13
2.	"I Got Friends That Do" (featuring Blake Shelton)	Danick Dupelle; Tebey Ottoh; Jimmy Thow	3:15
3.	"Home Run"	Ross Copperman; Dallas Davidson; Ashley Gorley	3:05
4.	"Dance with the Girl"	Jason Gantt; John Pierce; Emily Shackelton	3:04
5.	"I Wanna Be Your Tonight"	Green; Wade Kirby; Phil O'Donnell	3:10
6.	"Good Day for Living"	Dave Cohen; Bobby Hambrick; Neil Mason	3:10
7.	"Screened In"	Anthony Jerome Martin; Neil Thrasher	2:48
8.	"That's How I Grew Up"	Adam Craig; Josh London; Steven McMorran	3:21
9.	"Reckon"	Derek George; Randy Montana; Jeremy Stover	3:30
10.	"Why Can't She"	Craig; Jon Nite; Matt Rogers	4:00
11.	"One Two Step Closer"	Clint Daniels; Justin Lantz; Lance Miller	2:57
12.	"Hawaii on Me"	Chris Janson; Wil Nance; Kelly Roland	3:20
13.	"She Was"	Neal Coty; Jimmy Melton	3:20
Total length:			42:01

== Personnel ==
Credits adapted from the album's liner notes.

=== Musicians ===
- Joe Nichols – lead vocals
- Derek Wells – electric guitar
- Adam Schoenfeld – electric guitar
- Mickey Jack Cones – electric guitar, synthesizers, background vocals, programming
- Derek George – electric guitar, background vocals, programming
- Troy Lancaster – electric guitar
- Ilya Toshinsky – acoustic guitar, ukulele, banjo
- Jerry Roe – drums, percussion
- Craig Young – bass
- Tony Lucido – bass
- Mark Hill – bass
- Dave Cohen – keyboards, synthesizers, additional programming
- David Dorn – keyboards, synthesizers
- Charlie Judge – keyboards, synthesizers
- Mike Johnson – steel guitar
- Scotty Sanders – steel guitar
- Wes Hightower – background vocals

=== Technical and visuals ===
- Mickey Jack Cones – production, editing
- Derek George – production, editing
- Julian King – recording, editing
- Brady Tilow – editing
- Joel McKenny – recording assistance
- Lowell Reynolds – recording assistance
- Mike "Frog" Griffith – production assistance
- Dave "Doc" Abbott – photography
- Brian Massengale – A&R
