= The Impossible (song) =

Single by Joe Nichols

from the album Man with a Memory
- B-side: "Can't Hold a Halo to You"
- Released: March 11, 2002
- Genre: Country
- Length: 4:05
- Label: Universal South
- Songwriters: Kelley Lovelace; Lee Thomas Miller
- Producer: Brent Rowan

Joe Nichols singles chronology
| "I Hate the Way I Love You" (1997) | "The Impossible" (2002) | "Brokenheartsville" (2002) |

"The Impossible" is a song written by Kelley Lovelace and Lee Thomas Miller and recorded by American country music artist Joe Nichols. It was released in March 2002 as the first single from his 2002 album Man with a Memory. The song was Nichols’ first chart entry on the U.S. Billboard Hot Country Singles & Tracks (now Hot Country Songs) charts, peaking at number 3 in late 2002 and earned Kelly Lovelace and Lee Thomas Miller a Grammy nomination for Best Country Song. Fellow country singer Mark Chesnutt also cut the song around the same time Nichols did but shelved his version, finally releasing it as a bonus track on his compilation album Greatest Hits II.

== Content ==
"The Impossible" is a mid-tempo ballad mostly accompanied by acoustic guitar. In the song, the male narrator describes two situations in which events happen that seem impossible. Firstly, he describes his father who was so masculine that he never displayed any signs of sadness until his own father died. In the second verse, he describes a close schoolmate who was seriously injured in a car accident and subsequently told by doctors that he would be a paraplegic, but later stands up to speak at graduation. In both cases, he states that these situations made him "learn to never underestimate the impossible".

In the bridge, the narrator draws parallels from these two situations to his own ending relationship, stating that if such situations can be accomplished, it is then equally possible for him and his significant other to make amends ("So don't tell me that it's over, don't give up on you and me / 'Cause there's no such thing as hopeless if you believe").

== Music video ==
The music video was directed by Eric Welch and was filmed in April 2002 on Los Angeles' Long Beach Pier. It depicts Nichols singing while touring an old navy ship, while scenes of a father and his young son and a graduating teen are also shown.

== Critical reception ==
Maria Konicki Dinola of Allmusic gave the song a favorable review. She said that the song had an instantly identifiable message and called it "a brilliant choice for a first single with its radio-friendly appeal that will make a star out of Nichols." William Ruhlmann of Allmusic in his review of the album, discussed the song unfavorably, calling it "an unfortunate piece of confused country philosophy about how supposedly impossible things happen." He goes on to say that "the unfortunate part is that the chorus inescapably evokes the September 11 attacks ("Sometimes the things you think would never happen/Happen just like that"), which is in very bad taste, especially when the song comes to its real point, as the narrator concludes that maybe his girlfriend will come back.

== Chart performance ==
"The Impossible" debuted at number 56 on the U.S. Billboard Hot Country Singles & Tracks for the week of March 23, 2002. The song is Nichols' first chart entry in the US, peaking at number 3 on Hot Country Singles & Tracks (now Hot Country Songs) in 2002 and number 29 on the Billboard Hot 100.

| Chart (2002) | Peak position |
|---|---|
| US Billboard Hot 100 | 29 |
| US Hot Country Songs (Billboard) | 3 |

=== Year-end charts ===
| Chart (2002) | Position |
|---|---|
| US Country Songs (Billboard) | 10 |
