= Another Side of You =

Single by Joe Nichols

from the album Real Things
- Released: May 7, 2007
- Genre: Country
- Length: 3:00
- Label: Universal South
- Songwriters: Jamey Johnson; Carson Chamberlain
- Producers: Brent Rowan; Mark Wright

Joe Nichols singles chronology
"I'll Wait for You" (2006)	"Another Side of You" (2007)	"It Ain't No Crime" (2007)

"Another Side of You" is a song written by Jamey Johnson and Carson Chamberlain, and recorded by American country music artist Joe Nichols. It was released in May 2007 as the lead single from Nichols’ 2007 album Real Things. The song peaked at number 17 on the U.S. country chart and at number 99 on the U.S. Hot 100.

== Content ==
The protagonist expresses gratitude for all his wife does to keep the family running, which often leaves her stressed out and in a bad mood.

== Critical reception ==
Kevin John Coyne of Country Universe gave it a 'B+', saying the "Nichols is the perfect singer for material like this." He goes on to say that it is a great song for Mother's Day.

== Music video ==
The music video was directed by Chris Hicky.

== Chart performance ==
"Another Side of You" debuted at No. 50 on the Hot Country Songs chart dated May 19, 2007.

Chart (2007)	Peak position
US Billboard Hot 100	99
US Hot Country Songs (Billboard)	17
