= Undun (disambiguation) =

Undun is a 2011 existentialist concept album by the hip hop band the Roots.

Undun may also refer to:

- Undun (song), a 1969 hit single by the Canadian band the Guess Who
- Lake Undun, a lake on the island of Roti, Indonesia

== See also ==
- Undone (disambiguation)
