= Revelation (Joe Nichols album) =

2004 album by Joe Nichols

Studio album by Joe Nichols
- Released: June 29, 2004
- Genre: Country
- Length: 38:21
- Label: Universal South Records
- Producer: Brent Rowan

Joe Nichols chronology
Man with a Memory (2002)	Revelation (2004)	A Traditional Christmas (2004)

Singles from Revelation
- 1. "If Nobody Believed in You" Released: March 22, 2004; 2. "What's a Guy Gotta Do" Released: November 8, 2004

Professional ratings
Review scores
Source	Rating
Allmusic	3/5 stars
The Village Voice	C+

Revelation is the third studio album by American country music artist Joe Nichols. It was released on June 29, 2004 by Universal South Records. It produced two singles on the Billboard Hot Country Songs charts: "If Nobody Believed in You" at number 10 and "What's a Guy Gotta Do" at number 4. Also included is "Farewell Party", a cover of a Gene Watson hit single.

== Content ==
"A Singer in a Band" was previously recorded by Mark Wills on his 2003 album And the Crowd Goes Wild. "Don't Ruin It for the Rest of Us" was also recorded the same year by Mark Chesnutt on his album Savin' the Honky Tonk. "If I Ever Get Her Back" was previously recorded by Billy Yates on his 2001 album If I Could Go Back. "No Time to Cry" was recorded by Iris DeMent on her 1993 album My Life, and the title track was originally recorded by Waylon Jennings on his 1972 album Ladies Love Outlaws. In addition, The Oak Ridge Boys later recorded "The Shade" on their 2011 album It's Only Natural.

== Track listing ==
No.	Title	Writer(s)	Length
1.	"The Shade"	Shane Decker; Troy Jones	2:47
2.	"Singer in a Band"	Gary Harrison; Tim Mensy	3:13
3.	"Don't Ruin It for the Rest of Us"	Georgia Middleman; Jimmy Ritchey; Annie Tate; Sam Tate	3:39
4.	"I Wish That Wasn't All"	Chris DuBois; Ashley Gorley	3:36
5.	"If I Ever Get Her Back"	Billy Lawson; Billy Yates	2:48
6.	"If Nobody Believed in You"	Harley Allen	3:56
7.	"Farewell Party"	Lawton Williams	4:39
8.	"Things Like That (These Days)"	Mike Dekle; Byron Hill	3:30
9.	"Revelation"	Bobby Braddock	3:30
10.	"What's a Guy Gotta Do"	Joe Nichols; Kelley Lovelace; Don Sampson	2:22
11.	"No Time to Cry"	Iris DeMent	4:14

== Personnel ==
Adapted from AllMusic:

- Terry Crisp - steel guitar
- Eric Darken - percussion, vibraphone
- Dan Dugmore - steel guitar
- Stuart Duncan - fiddle
- Shannon Forrest - drums
- Larry Franklin - fiddle
- Wes Hightower - background vocals
- John Hughey - steel guitar
- David Hungate - bass guitar
- Rob Ickes - dobro
- Tim Lauer - Fender Rhodes, organ, pump organ
- Liana Manis - background vocals
- Gordon Mote - piano, synthesizer, synthesizer pads, Wurlitzer
- Brent Rowan - 6-string bass, dobro, 12-string guitar, keyboards, percussion, acoustic guitar, electric guitar, baritone guitar
- Brian Spradlin - electric guitar
- Bryan Sutton - acoustic guitar, hi-string guitar, mandolin
- Tommy White - steel guitar
- Joe Nichols - lead vocals

== Chart performance ==
=== Weekly charts ===
Chart (2004)	Peak position
US Billboard 200	23
US Top Country Albums (Billboard)	3

=== Year-end charts ===
Chart (2004)	Position
US Top Country Albums (Billboard)	57

=== Singles ===
Year	Single	Peak chart positions	
Year	Single	US Country	US
2004	"If Nobody Believed in You"	10	68
2004	"What's a Guy Gotta Do"	4	64
