= Joe Nichols (album) =

Studio album by Joe Nichols
- Released: August 27, 1996
- Recorded: 1996
- Studios: Muscle Shoals Sound, Muscle Shoals, Alabama; Sixteenth Avenue Sound, Nashville
- Genre: Country
- Length: 34:37
- Label: Intersound
- Producers: Randy Edwards, Todd Wilkes

Joe Nichols chronology
| Joe Nichols (1996) | Man with a Memory (2002) |

Alternative cover (Six of One, Half Dozen of the Other)
- 2002 re-release on Row Music Group

Alternative cover (The Early Years)
- 2003 re-release cover on Infinity Nashville

Singles from Joe Nichols
- 1. "Six of One, Half a Dozen of the Other" Released: 1996; 2. "Wal-Mart Parking Lot Social Club" Released: 1996; 3. "To Tell You the Truth, I Lied" Released: 1996; 4. "I Hate the Way I Love You" Released: 1997

Joe Nichols is the debut studio album by American country music artist Joe Nichols. It was released on August 27, 1996 by Intersound Records. It produced the singles "Six of One, Half a Dozen of the Other", "I Hate the Way I Love You", "To Tell You the Truth, I Lied", and "Wal-Mart Parking Lot Social Club". None of these singles charted on the Billboard Hot Country Songs charts in the U.S., but "Six of One, Half a Dozen (Of the Other)" reached number 74 on the RPM Top Country Tracks charts in Canada. It also reached #63 on the Cash Box Country Singles Chart. "She Could Care Less" was previously recorded by Shenandoah on their 1994 album In the Vicinity of the Heart.

== Release history ==
The album was re-issued twice: first in 2002 as Six of One, Half Dozen of the Other on Row Music Group, and again in 2003 as The Early Years on Infinity Nashville. The 2003 re-issue featured the tracks in a different order, as well as a bonus DVD featuring four videos.

== Critical reception ==
David Sokol of New Country magazine rated the album two-and-a-half stars out of five. He compared Nichols's vocal delivery to that of Garth Brooks and thought the songs were "delivered with poise and integrity", although he also thought the album was strongly targeted to teen-aged fans.

Under its reissue title of The Early Years, Stewart Mason of AllMusic wrote, "The songs are solid post-Alan Jackson mid-'90s Nashville country with a little more depth than the average hat act of the era, and there are a few minor gems here like the dryly humorous 'Wal-Mart Parking Lot' and the fine country-rocker 'She Could Care Less.'"

== Track listing (Joe Nichols and Six of One, Half Dozen of the Other) ==
| No. | Title | Writer(s) | Length |
|---|---|---|---|
| 1. | "Leave the Past Behind" | Randy Edwards; Lee Ogle | 4:12 |
| 2. | "She Could Care Less" | Billy Lawson | 3:19 |
| 3. | "In Spite of Myself" | Doug DeJoe; Keith Follesé | 3:24 |
| 4. | "Six of One, Half a Dozen of the Other" | DeJoe; Follesé | 3:15 |
| 5. | "To Tell You the Truth, I Lied" | Tommy Curry; Edwards; Larry Rainwater | 3:20 |
| 6. | "Independent Girl" | Joe Nichols; Edwards | 3:23 |
| 7. | "I Hate the Way I Love You" | Buck Moore; Steve Clark; Johnny MacRae | 3:07 |
| 8. | "Wal-Mart Parking Lot Social Club" | Bud McGuire; Marty Raybon; Troy Seals | 3:14 |
| 9. | "Old Cheyenne" | B. McGuire; Billy Bob Shane | 3:52 |
| 10. | "I'm Not That Kind of Guy" | Mike McGuire | 3:31 |
| Total length: | | | 34:37 |

== Track listing (The Early Years) ==
CD
| No. | Title | Length |
|---|---|---|
| 1. | "She Could Care Less" |
| 2. | "Six of One, Half a Dozen (Of the Other)" |
| 3. | "Wal-Mart Parking Lot" |
| 4. | "To Tell You the Truth, I Lied" |
| 5. | "I Hate the Way I Love You" |
| 6. | "Independent Girl" |
| 7. | "In Spite of Myself" |
| 8. | "I'm Not That Kind of Guy" |
| 9. | "Old Cheyenne" |
| 10. | "Leave the Past Behind" |

DVD
| No. | Title | Length |
|---|---|---|
| 1. | "Six of One, Half a Dozen (Of the Other)" |
| 2. | "Wal-Mart Parking Lot" |
| 3. | "To Tell You the Truth, I Lied" |
| 4. | "I Hate the Way I Love You" |

== Personnel ==
Adapted from AllMusic:

- Spady Brannan - bass guitar
- Jim Collins - backing vocals
- Thomas Flora - backing vocals
- Larry Franklin - fiddle
- Dennis Holt - drums
- Chris Leuzinger - electric guitar
- B. James Lowry - acoustic guitar
- Terry McMillan - harmonica
- Steve Nathan - keyboards
- Scott Sanders - steel guitar
- Joe Nichols - lead vocals

== Chart performance ==
=== Singles ===
| Year | Single | Peak positions |
| Year | Single | CAN Country |
|---|---|---|
| 1996 | "Six of One, Half a Dozen of the Other" | 74 |
| 1996 | "Wal-Mart Parking Lot Social Club" | — |
| 1996 | "To Tell You the Truth, I Lied" | — |
| 1997 | "I Hate the Way I Love You" | — |
"—" denotes releases that did not chart
