= Man with a Memory =

Studio album by Joe Nichols
- Released: July 23, 2002
- Recorded: February 2000–2002
- Studio: Cool Tools (Nashville); EMI (Nashville); Ocean Way (Nashville); OmniSound (Nashville); Tin Ear (Nashville); Tree (Nashville)
- Genre: Country; honky-tonk
- Length: 45:09
- Label: Universal South
- Producer: Brent Rowan

Joe Nichols chronology
Joe Nichols (1996)	Man with a Memory (2002)	Revelation (2004)

Singles from Man with a Memory
- 1. "The Impossible" Released: March 11, 2002; 2. "Brokenheartsville" Released: November 4, 2002; 3. "She Only Smokes When She Drinks" Released: April 28, 2003; 4. "Cool to Be a Fool" Released: September 8, 2003

Man with a Memory is the second studio album and major-label debut by American country music artist Joe Nichols. It was released on July 23, 2002, by Universal South Records. The album was produced by long-time session guitarist Brent Rowan as his first production credit.

Four singles were released: "The Impossible", "Brokenheartsville" (his first number one), "She Only Smokes When She Drinks", and "Cool to Be a Fool". It was certified platinum by the RIAA on August 17, 2017, and received a Grammy nomination for Best Country Album in 2003.

== Background ==
After the release of Nichols' self-titled debut in 1996, Intersound Records folded, and a subsequent stint with Giant Records led to no releases. Nichols was stuck in day jobs, including a cable installer, a steak salesman, a furniture mover, and a bartender. In 1999, after meeting notable session guitarist Brent Rowan, Nichols was able to be the first signing to the newly formed Universal South Records, which was formed by longtime Nashville executives Tony Brown and Tim DuBois. The album was the first production credit for Rowan, and recording began in February 2000.

"Everything's a Thing" was originally recorded by Craig Morgan on his 2000 self-titled debut album. "Life Don't Have to Mean Nothing at All" was recorded by Tom T. Hall on his 1997 album Home Grown.

== Critical reception and commercial performance ==
Professional ratings
Review scores
Source	Rating
AllMusic	2.5/5 stars
Jacksonville Daily News	3.5/5 stars
Entertainment Weekly	B
The Philadelphia Inquirer	B

Man with a Memory peaked at number 9 on the Billboard Top Country Albums chart in April 2003. The album was also nominated for Best Country Album in the 45th Annual Grammy Awards, while the album's lead single, "The Impossible", was nominated for Best Country Song. Nichols also won the Horizon Award, now known as the Country Music Association Award for New Artist of the Year, at the 2003 Country Music Association Awards following the album's release.

William Ruhlmann of AllMusic gave the album two and a half stars out of five, criticizing the album's material as "mediocrity". Jim Patterson, an Associated Press journalist, gave Nichols a three-and-a-half-star out of five rating, comparing him to David Ball, and the criticism was aimed at the slick production. Nick Cristiano of The Philadelphia Inquirer called Nichols "experienced beyond his years" and said the album's material was similar to that of Merle Haggard.

== Track listing ==
No.	Title	Writer(s)	Length
1.	"The Impossible"	Kelley Lovelace; Lee Thomas Miller	4:05
2.	"Joe's Place"	Mike Dekle; Byron Hill	2:40
3.	"Brokenheartsville"	Randy Boudreaux; Clint Daniels; Donny Kees; Blake Mevis	3:51
4.	"She Only Smokes When She Drinks"	Connie Harrington; Tony Martin; Tim Nichols	3:24
5.	"Everything's a Thing"	Joe Nichols; Steve Dean; Wil Nance	3:18
6.	"That Would Be Her"	Reed Nielsen; Jeffrey Steele	4:03
7.	"Cool to Be a Fool"	J. Nichols; Dean; Nance	2:56
8.	"Can't Hold a Halo to You"	J. Nichols; Don Sampson	3:41
9.	"You Can't Break the Fall"	Mark McClurg; Jerry Salley	3:51
10.	"You Ain't Heard Nothin' Yet"	Tony Haselden; Tim Mensy	4:13
11.	"Life Don't Have to Mean Nothin' at All"	Tom T. Hall	2:59
12.	"Man with a Memory"	Charlie Black; Rory Bourke	5:58

== Personnel ==
Credits adapted from Tidal.

=== Musicians ===
- Joe Nichols – lead vocals, background vocals (all tracks)
- Shannon Forrest – drums (tracks 1–5, 7–11)
- David Hungate – bass (all tracks)
- Brent Rowan – electric guitar (tracks 1–5, 7, 8, 10, 12), acoustic guitar (1, 3, 4, 8, 12), 12-string guitar (1, 6), baritone guitar (3, 8), background vocals (5), gut-string guitar, hi-string guitar (6)
- Eric Darken – percussion (tracks 1–4, 6, 8, 10, 12)
- Tim Lauer – keyboards (tracks 1, 8, 12), Rhodes piano (2), organ (3–7, 9, 10), accordion (6, 7), mellotron (6)
- Liana Manis – background vocals (tracks 1, 4, 8, 10)
- Harry Stinson – background vocals (tracks 1, 4, 8)
- Bryan Sutton – acoustic guitar (tracks 2, 3, 7, 9–11), mandolin (2, 3), guitar (5), banjo (7)
- Aubrey Haynie – fiddle (tracks 2, 3, 7, 9, 10)
- Mike Johnson – pedal steel guitar (track 2)
- Vince Gill – background vocals (tracks 2, 11)
- Gordon Mote – piano (tracks 3, 7, 9, 10)
- Dan Dugmore – steel guitar (tracks 3, 4, 8)
- Wes Hightower – background vocals (tracks 3, 5–7, 9, 10, 12)
- Vinnie Colaiuta – drums (tracks 6, 12)
- Shane Keister – organ (tracks 6, 12)
- John Hughey – steel guitar (tracks 6, 10)
- Tommy White – steel guitar (track 9)
- Chris Thile – mandolin (track 11)
- Jerry Douglas – dobro (track 11)

=== Technical ===
- Brent Rowan – production
- Eric Conn – mastering
- Jonathan Russell – mastering
- Ed Seay – mixing
- Chris Latham – recording
- Ben Fowler – recording
- Doug Johnson – recording
- Dustin Richardson – immersive mixing
- Rodney Dawson – transfer engineer
- David Bryant – assistant recording

== Charts ==
=== Weekly charts ===
Chart (2002–03)	Peak position
US Billboard 200	72
US Top Country Albums (Billboard)	9
US Heatseekers Albums (Billboard)	1

=== Year-end charts ===
Chart (2002)	Position
US Top Country Albums (Billboard)	72
Chart (2003)	Position
US Billboard 200	197
US Top Country Albums (Billboard)	20
Chart (2004)	Position
US Top Country Albums (Billboard)	56

=== Singles ===
Year	Single	Peak chart positions	
Year	Single	US Country	US
2002	"The Impossible"	3	29
2002	"Brokenheartsville"	1	27
2003	"She Only Smokes When She Drinks"	17	72
2003	"Cool to Be a Fool"	18	106

== Certifications ==
Certifications for Man with a Memory
Region	Certification	Certified units/sales
United States (RIAA)	Platinum	1,000,000^{‡}
^{^} Shipments figures based on certification alone.
