= Annie Bosko =

American singer-songwriter

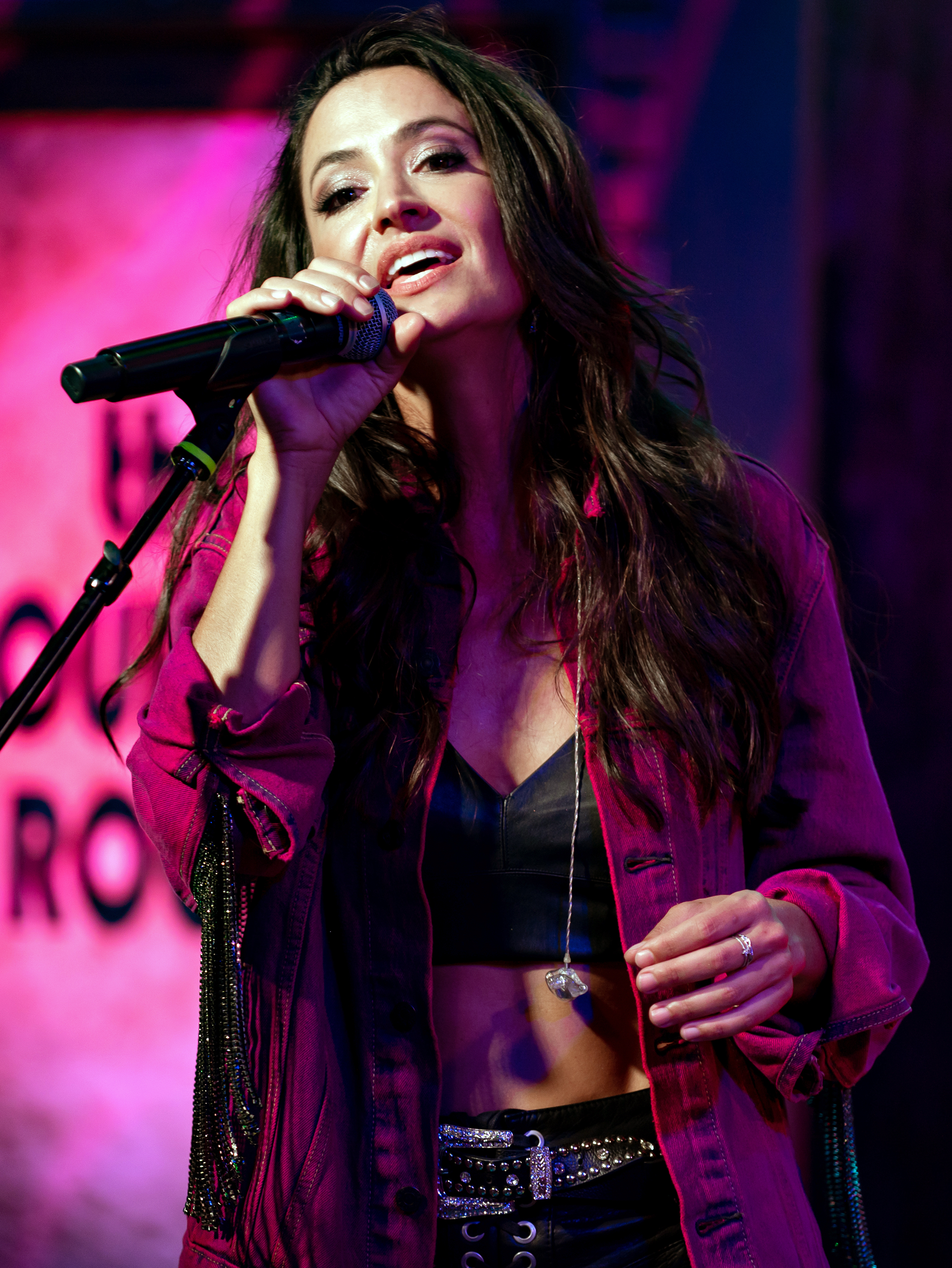
- Bosko in 2020

Background information
- Born: February 11, 1986 (age 40); Thousand Oaks, California, U.S.
- Genre: Country
- Occupation: Singer-songwriter
- Instruments: Vocals; Guitar; Harmonica; Ukulele
- Years active: 2014–present
- Label: Stone Country
- Website: anniebosko.com

Annie Bosko (born February 11, 1986) is an American country music singer-songwriter from Thousand Oaks, California signed to QHMG/Stone Country Records. Her debut album, California Cowgirl, was released on October 3, 2025.

== Background ==
Growing up in Thousand Oaks, California, Bosko performed in various venues from a young age, and at the age of 14, sang on the soundtrack for The Little Mermaid II: Return to the Sea (2000), before relocating to Nashville, Tennessee in the mid-2000s. "Crooked Halo", her first solo effort, was released in November 2014 and received play on satellite radio and CMT. She found work recording jingles, cutting demos, and writing songs for other artists, touring as an opening act for many prominent country music artists, and eventually made her Grand Ole Opry debut on September 30, 2023. In August 2023, it was announced that Bosko had signed a recording contract with Stone Country Records, and "Neon Baby" was released as her debut single to country radio on November 6, 2023. It debuted on the Billboard Country Airplay chart at number 60 in July 2024. Her self-titled EP was produced by Derek George and Mickey Jack Cones and released on January 5, 2024.

In 2024, Bosko made her C2C: Country to Country debut in Glasgow, performing a solo acoustic set to a sold-out arena. She has also performed at major U.S. festivals including Stagecoach, Tortuga Music Festival, CMA Fest, Faster Horses, and Watershed. Bosko has performed the national anthem at numerous sporting events, including those for NASCAR, the NFL, NBA, PBR, and MLB. She has also performed the "Star-Spangled Banner" at Madison Square Garden.

In 2025, Bosko was featured in an Ariat campaign alongside San Francisco 49ers quarterback and fellow Ariat ambassador Brock Purdy, which included her song "Honky Tonk Heartbeat."

Bosko's debut album, California Cowgirl, was released on October 3, 2025. The 18-track project was produced by Trent Willmon and David Mescon, and included collaborations with Dwight Yoakam, Joe Nichols, and Darius Rucker, and a cover of Kris Kristofferson's "Help Me Make It Through the Night". She later released a new version of her song "God Winks" as a collaboration with Amy Grant.

== Discography ==
=== Studio albums ===
List of EPs, with selected details, chart positions and sales
Title	Album details
California Cowgirl	Release date: October 3, 2025; Label: Stone Country; Format: Digital download

=== Extended plays ===
List of EPs, with selected details, chart positions and sales
Title	Album details
Annie Bosko	Release date: January 5, 2024; Label: Stone Country; Format: Digital download

=== Singles ===
List of singles, with selected chart positions
Title	Year	Peak chart positions	Album
Title	Year	US Country Airplay	Album
"Neon Baby"	2023	56	Annie Bosko
"Better Than You" (with Joe Nichols)	2024	44	Honky Tonks & Country Songs
