= It Ain't No Crime =

Single by Joe Nichols

from the album Real Things
- Released: December 13, 2007
- Genre: Country
- Length: 3:37
- Label: Universal South
- Songwriters: Tony Martin; Tom Shapiro; Mark Nesler
- Producers: Brent Rowan; Mark Wright

Joe Nichols singles chronology
"Another Side of You" (2007)	"It Ain't No Crime" (2007)	"Believers" (2009)

"It Ain't No Crime" is a song written Tom Shapiro, Tony Martin, and Mark Nesler. It was recorded by American country music artist – Joe Nichols. It was released in December 2007 as the second and final single from Nichols’ 2007 album Real Things. The song peaked at number 16 on the US Hot Country Songs chart and at number 5 on the Bubbling Under Hot 100.

== Content ==
The song's narrator is a man who is trying to relax, but finds himself constantly distracted by other people who try to persuade him to get married and get a job. This central character defends his relaxed lifestyle by telling his peers that "it ain't no crime" to live such a life.

== Critical reception ==
Kevin John Coyne of Country Universe gave it a B+ grade, saying that the song needs a bit more edge but that Nichols "does well enough delivering this country boy’s slacker anthem."

== Music video ==
The music video was directed by Kristen Barlowe and premiered in early 2008.

== Chart performance ==
The song debuted at number 45 on the Hot Country Songs chart dated January 19, 2008.

Chart (2007–2008)	Peak position
US Hot Country Songs (Billboard)	16
US Bubbling Under Hot 100 (Billboard)	5
