= I'll Wait for You (Joe Nichols song) =

Single by Joe Nichols

from the album III
- Released: July 31, 2006
- Recorded: 2005
- Genre: Country
- Length: 4:07 (album version); 3:52 (radio edit)
- Label: Universal South
- Songwriters: Bill Anderson; Harley Allen
- Producer: Buddy Cannon

Joe Nichols singles chronology
"Size Matters (Someday)" (2006)	"I'll Wait for You" (2006)	"Another Side of You" (2007)

"I'll Wait for You" is a song written by Bill Anderson and Harley Allen and recorded by American country music artist Joe Nichols. It was released in July 2006 as the third single from Nichols' album III. The song reached number 7 on the U.S. Billboard Hot Country Songs chart and peaked at #71 on the Billboard Hot 100.

== Content ==
The protagonist wants to visit his wife, but is stranded in Montana due to a snowstorm, and so calls her to inform her of his plans. She replies that she will wait for him, while reminiscing over occasions such as the previous Christmas and the day their son was born, where she did not want the big moment to take place (e.g., the opening of presents, inducing of labor) without her husband present. In the final verse, it is revealed that the wife is on her deathbed at the hospital, and her husband has arrived too late to see her. She has left him a note stating that she will wait for him before entering heaven.

== Music videos ==
Two videos were made for the song. In the first video, Nichols plays the song's protagonist at various ages; makeup was used to make him appear thirty years older. The song's first video first aired on the television network CMT on November 23, 2006. A second video was later made, featuring an acoustic remix of the song and shot in black and white. This version is the one most often played on TV. This second video was directed by Chris Hicky, while Warren P. Sonada directed the original video.

== Chart positions ==
Chart (2006–2007)	Peak position
US Billboard Hot 100	71
US Hot Country Songs (Billboard)	7

=== Year-end charts ===
Chart (2007)	Position
US Country Songs (Billboard)	36

== Certifications ==
Region	Certification	Certified units/sales
United States (RIAA)	Gold	500,000^{‡}
^{‡} Sales+streaming figures based on certification alone.
