= Better Than You (Joe Nichols and Annie Bosko song) =

Single by Joe Nichols and Annie Bosko

from the album Honky Tonks & Country Songs and California Cowgirl
- Released: October 7, 2024
- Genre: Country
- Length: 3:46
- Label: Quartz Hill
- Songwriters: Derek George; John Pierce
- Producers: Mickey Jack Cones; Derek George

Joe Nichols singles chronology
"Brokenhearted" (2023)	"Better Than You" (2024)	"Say La V" (2026)

Annie Bosko singles chronology
"Neon Baby" (2023)	"Better Than You" (2024)

Music video
- "Better Than You" on YouTube

"Better Than You" is a song recorded by American country music artists Joe Nichols and Annie Bosko. It was released to country radio on October 7, 2024, as the lead single from Nichols' eleventh studio album, Honky Tonks & Country Songs. It was also later included on Bosko's debut album, California Cowgirl (2025). The song was co-written by Derek George and John Pierce.

== Content ==
"Better Than You" was co-written by co-producer Derek George alongside John Pierce. The song is about two lovers who realize that there is no other love that can compare to what they have. While working with Bosko, Nichols praised her as "an old soul who shares a love of old country music."

In January 2025, an acoustic version was released.

== Critical reception ==
Robert K. Oermann praised Bosko and Nichols' chemistry as "goosebump-thrilling sounding." Billy Dukes of Taste of Country described Bosko as Nichols' Kelly Clarkson, in reference to the duet between Clarkson and Jason Aldean on 2010's chart-topping "Don't You Wanna Stay". Buddy Iahn of The Music Universe praised Nichols' vocal performance, stating, "the song builds as Nichols reminds listeners why he is one of country's biggest neotraditionalists."

== Chart performance ==
Upon release, "Better Than You" was a top-five most-added song on US country radio for five consecutive weeks, with over 100 radio adds as of January 2025.

== Charts ==
Chart (2024–25)	Peak position
US Country Airplay (Billboard)	44
