= She Only Smokes When She Drinks =

Single by Joe Nichols

from the album Man with a Memory
- B-side: "Joe's Place"
- Released: April 28, 2003
- Genre: Country
- Length: 3:24
- Label: Universal South
- Songwriters: Connie Harrington; Tim Nichols; Tony Martin
- Producer: Brent Rowan

Joe Nichols singles chronology
"Brokenheartsville" (2002)	"She Only Smokes When She Drinks" (2003)	"Cool to Be a Fool" (2003)

"She Only Smokes When She Drinks" is a song written by Connie Harrington, Tim Nichols, and Tony Martin and recorded by American country music singer Joe Nichols. It was released in April 2003 as the third single from his 2002 album Man with a Memory. The song peaked at number 17 on the U.S. Billboard Hot Country Singles & Tracks (now Hot Country Songs) chart and also reached number 72 on the Billboard Hot 100.

== Content ==
The protagonist is a bartender. A young man asks him for advice, having been asked to light a cigarette by a woman he wishes to approach. The protagonist replies that the gesture means little because knowing the woman as a regular patron, she only comes to the bar to take her mind off men who have done her wrong.

== Critical reception ==
Deborah Evans Price of Billboard magazine reviewed the song favorably, saying Rowan's production is "simple and understated, letting Nichols' smokey baritone paint the portrait of a 'complicated girl...who ain't that hard to figure out."

== Music video ==
The music video was directed by Morgan Lawley and premiered in early 2003.

== Chart performance ==
"She Only Smokes When She Drinks" debuted at number 58 on the U.S. Billboard Hot Country Singles & Tracks chart for the week of May 3, 2003.

Chart (2003)	Peak position
US Billboard Hot 100	72
US Hot Country Songs (Billboard)	17
