= Come Undone =

Come Undone may refer to:

- "Come Undone" (Duran Duran song), from their 1993 album Duran Duran
- Come Undone, the United States title for the 2000 French film Presque rien by Sébastien Lifshitz
- "Come Undone" (Robbie Williams song), from his 2002 album Escapology
- "Come Undone", a song by The Delgados, from their 2004 album Universal Audio
- "Coming Undone", a song from the 2005 Korn album See You On The Other Side
- Come Undone (film), a 2010 Italian film
- "Come Undone", a song from the 2009 Placebo album Battle for the Sun
- "Undun" a song by The Guess Who
- "Come Undone" (Scooby-Doo! Mystery Incorporated), the final episode of Scooby-Doo! Mystery Incorporated
