= Honky Tonks & Country Songs =

Studio album by Joe Nichols
- Released: October 25, 2024
- Genre: Country
- Length: 37:57
- Label: Quartz Hill
- Producers: Mickey Jack Cones; Derek George

Joe Nichols chronology
Good Day for Living (2022)	Honky Tonks & Country Songs (2024)

Singles from Honky Tonks & Country Songs
- 1. "Better Than You" Released: October 7, 2024

Honky Tonks & Country Songs is the eleventh studio album by American country music artist Joe Nichols. It was released on October 25, 2024, via Quartz Hill. One single and two promotional singles have been released from the album, including "Better Than You", a duet with Annie Bosko, which became Nichols' highest charting song on the Billboard Country Airplay chart since 2022.

== Background and recording ==
Nichols first announced the album on August 27, 2024, confirming its release for October 25 via Quartz Hill Records. The album marked his first full-length project since Good Day for Living in 2022. Nichols worked closely with longtime producers Mickey Jack Cones and Derek George.

According to Nichols, Honky Tonks & Country Songs was heavily inspired by his early career experiences playing in small-town bars and dancehalls: "I've been in a lot of honky tonks. They're the only places I could play for a long time, and you learn about being an entertainer there, because people come wanting to hear a good song and have a good time." He added that the album aimed to balance upbeat songs with emotionally heavier material, reflecting his philosophy that country music's role is "to make people feel good" in different ways.

Nichols also emphasized that his voice was in its strongest form in years, allowing him to reconnect with his early "old-school" vocal style during the recording sessions.

On October 19, 2024, Nichols headlined a release party at Gilley's Dallas, coinciding with the venue's 21st anniversary celebration. The album was officially released on October 25, 2024, across all digital and physical platforms. Leading up to the launch, Nichols co-hosted Backstage Country with Kelly Ford, where he discussed the making of the record and shared stories behind individual songs.

== Themes ==
Honky Tonks & Country Songs blends traditionalist leanings with modern country production. The record includes mid-tempo ballads, honky-tonk anthems, and heartfelt duets.

== Critical reception ==
MusicRow critics Robert K. Oermann praised the album as "goosebump-thrilling," singling out "Better Than You" as a standout track. Billboard described Nichols as "one of country music's most consistent, indelible vocalists," noting that the album connected traditional country's past with its resurgent present.

== Track listing ==
Honky Tonks & Country Songs track listing
No.	Title	Writer(s)	Length
1.	"Honky Tonks and Country Songs"	Casey Brown; Tyler Hubbard; Matt Jenkins; Travis Wood	3:09
2.	"Bottle It Up"	Dan Isbell; Josh Kear; Paul Sikes	2:53
3.	"People Still Doing That"	Jeremy Crady; Clint Daniels; Justin Lantz	3:32
4.	"Helpless in a Honky Tonk"	Dan Alley; Ryan Beaver; Jared Keim; Neil Medley	3:33
5.	"Country Boy Can Survive"	Hank Williams Jr.	4:21
6.	"Hard Fires" (featuring Stevie Woodward)	Michael Carter; Adam Craig; Matt Rogers	3:33
7.	"Doin' Life with You"	Jimmy Yeary	4:01
8.	"Y'all Do"	Michael Hardy; Jake Mitchell; Mike Walker	3:12
9.	"On and On"	Terri Jo Box; Jason Sellers; Dan Smalley	2:57
10.	"Better Than You" (with Annie Bosko)	Derek George; John Pierce	3:46
11.	"Amazing Ways"	Isbell; Jordan Minton; Jonathan Smith	2:55
Total length:			37:57

== Personnel ==
Credits adapted from the album's liner notes.

=== Musicians ===
- Joe Nichols – lead vocals
- Rob McNelley – electric guitar
- Nate Keeterle – electric guitar
- Derek Wells – electric guitar
- Derek George – electric guitar, acoustic guitar, drums, percussion, background vocals, programming
- Mickey Jack Cones – electric guitar, acoustic guitar, keyboards, drums, percussion, background vocals, programming
- Ilya Toshinsky – acoustic guitar
- B. James Lowry – acoustic guitar
- David Dorn – keyboards
- Dave Cohen – keyboards
- Jimmie Lee Sloas – bass
- Mark Hill – bass
- Mike Johnson – steel guitar
- Jerry Roe – drums, percussion
- Lonnie Wilson – drums, percussion
- Jenee Fleenor – fiddle
- Wes Hightower – background vocals

=== Technical and visuals ===
- Mickey Jack Cones – production, mixing, additional recording
- Derek George – production, additional recording
- Andrew Mendelson – mastering
- Julian King – recording
- Zach Kuhlman – recording assistance
- Steve Cordray – recording assistance
- Gregg Roth – photography
