= Never Gets Old =

Studio album by Joe Nichols
- Released: July 28, 2017
- Genre: Country
- Label: Red Bow Records
- Producers: Tony Brown; Mickey Jack Cones; Brent Rowan

Joe Nichols chronology
Crickets (2013)	Never Gets Old (2017)	Good Day for Living (2022)

Singles from Never Gets Old
- 1. "Never Gets Old" Released: July 17, 2017; 2. "Billy Graham's Bible" Released: May 29, 2018

Never Gets Old is the ninth studio album by American country music artist Joe Nichols. It was released on July 28, 2017 by Red Bow Records. The album includes the singles "Never Gets Old" and "Billy Graham's Bible".

== Content ==
The album includes "Billy Graham's Bible", which previously appeared on his 2013 album Crickets. It also includes a cover of Sir Mix-a-Lot's "Baby Got Back", performed with comedian Darren Knight.

Mickey Jack Cones produced most of the album except for "Diamonds Make Babies" and "Never Gets Old" (produced by Brent Rowan) and "Billy Graham's Bible" (produced by Cones & Tony Brown).

"Diamonds Make Babies" was previously recorded by two other artists: Dierks Bentley on his 2012 album, Home, and Bradley Gaskin on his 2012 self-titled EP.

While much of the album followed radio trends of the time, Nichols was happy to include a more traditional song, "I'd Sing About You". He told a reporter, "I'm a traditional artist at heart. I think everything I do has to kind of base around being a traditional country guy. We can step out and do current radio things today, but deep down, my bread is buttered with traditional country music."

In the same interview, when asked about the "party themes" on other songs, Nichols replied, "We do what we have to do, so we can do what we want to do."

== Critical reception ==
Stephen Thomas Erlewine rated the album 3.5 out of 5 stars. His review noted more modern influences in the production and lyrics, and praised Nichols' "easy touch" on the songs. He concluded his review by stating that "He's an old-fashioned guy who is happy living in the modern world, and that's why Never Gets Old is so appealing: It feels familiar yet fresh."

== Track listing ==
Never Gets Old track listing
No.	Title	Writer(s)	Length
1.	"Diamonds Make Babies"	Jim Beavers; Lee Thomas Miller; Chris Stapleton	3:21
2.	"Girl in the Song"	Neal Coty; Lynn Hutton	3:39
3.	"We All Carry Something"	Westin Davis; Justin Weaver	3:26
4.	"I'd Sing About You"	Preston Brust; Chris Janson; Chris Lucas	3:13
5.	"Breathless"	Zach Crowell; Matt Jenkins; Jon Nite	3:55
6.	"Tall Boys"	Monty Criswell; Shane Minor; Tom Shapiro	2:48
7.	"Hostage"	Aaron Eshuis; Ryan Lafferty; Brett Tyler	2:56
8.	"Never Gets Old"	Connie Harrington; Steve Moakler	3:37
9.	"Billy Graham's Bible"	Coty; Chris DuBois; Jimmy Melton	3:06
10.	"So You're Saying"	Ross Copperman; Josh Kear; Chris Tompkins	3:41
11.	"This Side of the River"	Jeremy Crady; Clint Daniels; Justin Lantz	3:20
12.	"Baby Got Back" (featuring Darren Knight)	Anthony Ray	2:56
Total length:			40:01

== Personnel ==
Adapted from AllMusic

- Eddie Bayers - drums
- Pat Buchanan - electric guitar
- Hailey Cirovski - background vocals
- Jackson Daniel Cones - background vocals
- Mickey Jack Cones - acoustic guitar, electric guitar, keyboards, programming, background vocals
- Shannon Cones - background vocals
- J.T. Corenflos - electric guitar
- David Dorn - keyboards
- Dan Dugmore - steel guitar
- Jeneé Fleenor - fiddle
- Shannon Forrest - drums
- Kenny Greenberg - acoustic guitar
- Tony Harrell - keyboards
- Aubrey Haynie - fiddle
- Wes Hightower - background vocals
- Mark Hill - bass guitar
- Mike Johnson - steel guitar
- Charlie Judge - keyboards
- Jeff King - electric guitar
- Darren Knight - featured vocals on "Baby Got Back"
- Troy Lancaster - electric guitar
- Tim Lauer - accordion
- B. James Lowry - acoustic guitar
- Gordon Mote - keyboards
- Steve Nathan - keyboards
- Joe Nichols - lead vocals
- Russ Pahl - steel guitar
- Brent Rowan - acoustic guitar, electric guitar
- Dave Salley - background vocals
- Russell Terrell - background vocals
- Brady Tilow - programming, background vocals
- Ilya Toshinsky - acoustic guitar
- Lonnie Wilson - drums
- Glenn Worf - bass guitar
- Craig Young - bass guitar

== Chart performance ==
Chart (2017)	Peak position
US Billboard 200	120
US Top Country Albums (Billboard)	15
US Independent Albums (Billboard)	6
