= Tequila Makes Her Clothes Fall Off =

Single by Joe Nichols

from the album III
- Released: August 1, 2005
- Recorded: 2005
- Genre: Country
- Length: 3:07
- Label: Universal South
- Songwriters: Gary Hannan; John Wayne Wiggins
- Producer: Buddy Cannon

Joe Nichols singles chronology
"What's a Guy Gotta Do" (2004)	"Tequila Makes Her Clothes Fall Off" (2005)	"Size Matters (Someday)" (2006)

"Tequila Makes Her Clothes Fall Off" is a song written by Gary Hannan and John Wayne Wiggins and recorded by American country music artist Joe Nichols. It was released in August 2005 as the first single from Nichols' album III. The song became Nichols' second number one hit on the U.S. Billboard Hot Country Songs chart in late 2005.

One of the song's co-writers, John Wiggins performed with his sister Audrey in the mid-1990s as the country duo John & Audrey Wiggins.

== Content ==
The song's narrator discusses how a woman close to him carelessly misplaces her clothes when she drinks tequila, a problem that does not seem to be triggered by other alcoholic beverages.

== Music video ==
A music video was released on October 6, 2005, and directed by Stephen Shepherd. After Nichols ushers his grandmother out of the house, he proceeds to throw a wild pool party during which copious amounts of tequila are consumed. The video contains a plot twist at the end where it is implied that the song lyrics may be referring not to a significant other, but rather the grandmother.

== Critical reception ==
Kevin John Coyne of Country Universe gave the song a negative rating, saying that it was "mind-numbingly inane." In his review of the album, Stephen Thomas Erlewine of Allmusic discussed the song favorably, saying that while it has a "silly name and would seem like a throwaway novelty, it is genuinely funny". He also said that Nichols "delivers it with sly humor and a low-key swagger that shows more character, as a vocalist, than he did on his previous albums."

== Chart performance ==
The song debuted at number 59 on the U.S. Billboard Hot Country Songs chart on the week ending August 6, 2005.

Chart (2005–2006)	Peak position
US Billboard Hot 100	32
US Hot Country Songs (Billboard)	1

=== Year-end charts ===
Chart (2005)	Position
US Country Songs (Billboard)	59

Chart (2006)	Position
US Country Songs (Billboard)	57

== Certifications ==
Region	Certification	Certified units/sales
New Zealand (RMNZ)	Gold	15,000^{‡}
United States (RIAA)	3× Platinum	3,000,000^{‡}
^{‡} Sales+streaming figures based on certification alone.
