= Size Matters (Someday) =

Single by Joe Nichols

from the album III
- Released: January 24, 2006
- Recorded: 2005
- Genre: Country
- Length: 2:51
- Label: Universal South
- Songwriters: Byron Hill, Mike Dekle
- Producer: Buddy Cannon

Joe Nichols singles chronology
"Tequila Makes Her Clothes Fall Off" (2005)	"Size Matters (Someday)" (2006)	"I'll Wait for You" (2006)

"Size Matters (Someday)" is a song written by Byron Hill and Mike Dekle and recorded by American country music artist Joe Nichols. It was released in January 2006 as the second single from Nichols' album III. The song peaked at number 9 on the U.S. Billboard Hot Country Songs chart. The song also won an ASCAP Award in 2007 for being among the most performed country songs of 2006.

== Content ==
The song depicts a woman who, despite having ambitious material goals for the future, only wants a man to love her for right now. Hence, the only thing whose size matters to her is his heart.

== Music video ==
The music video was directed by Warren P. Sonada and premiered in April 13, 2006.

== Chart positions ==
"Size Matters (Someday)" debuted at number 55 on the U.S. Billboard Hot Country Songs for the week of January 28, 2006.

Chart (2006)	Peak position
US Billboard Hot 100	73
US Hot Country Songs (Billboard)	9

=== Year-end charts ===
Chart (2006)	Position
US Country Songs (Billboard)	33
