= Hard to Be Cool =

Single by Joe Nichols

from the album Crickets
- Released: September 1, 2014
- Genre: Country
- Length: 3:06
- Label: Red Bow
- Songwriters: Rob Hatch; Jason Sellers
- Producers: Mickey Jack Cones; Derek George

Joe Nichols singles chronology
"Yeah" (2014)	"Hard to Be Cool" (2014)	"Freaks Like Me" (2015)

"Hard to Be Cool" is a song recorded by American country music artist Joe Nichols. It was released in September 2014 as his third single for Red Bow Records and from his eighth studio album Crickets. The song was written by Jason Sellers and Rob Hatch.

== Critical reception ==
Wes Langeler of Whiskey Riff gave the song 7 stars out of 10, praising its guitar work and calling it "radio friendly".

== Chart performance ==
Chart (2014–2015)	Peak position
Canada Country (Billboard)	50
US Country Airplay (Billboard)	22
US Hot Country Songs (Billboard)	32

=== Year-end charts ===
Chart (2015)	Position
US Country Airplay (Billboard)	87
US Hot Country Songs (Billboard)	96
