= Freaks Like Me =

Single by Joe Nichols
- Released: September 21, 2015
- Genre: Country
- Length: 2:58
- Label: Red Bow
- Songwriters: Monty Criswell; Josh Thompson; Lynn Hutton
- Producer: Mickey Jack Cones

Joe Nichols singles chronology
"Hard to Be Cool" (2014)	"Freaks Like Me" (2015)	"Undone" (2016)

"Freaks Like Me" is a song recorded by American country music artist Joe Nichols. It was released in September 2015 as his fourth single for Red Bow Records. The song was written by Monty Criswell, Josh Thompson and Lynn Hutton.

== Content ==
The song is a "sturdy mid-tempo anthem" expressing praise for a person who, according to Nichols, "honors tradition and old-fashioned things".

== History ==
Nichols heard the song when working on his second album for Red Bow, but later found out that the song had been on hold for Justin Moore. Upon discovering that Nichols was "passionate" about the song, Moore gave him permission to record it instead.

== Critical reception ==
Giving it a "B+", Tammy Ragusa of Nash Country Weekly wrote that the song is "refreshing to those who hanker for something different" and that "Joe's honey-smooth vocals give the tune an almost sleepy feel that contradicts the thumping groove, creating a unique, unapologetic vibe that makes you want to listen again." An uncredited review from Taste of Country was favorable, saying that the song "is louder and edgier than most of what’s in the veteran’s catalog, but he keeps it country lyrically. Fans will embrace his message and his ironic way of delivering it. He treads along a line that separates coy from cynicism, but never crosses it." Giving it 5 out of 5 stars, Markos Papadatos of Digital Journal praised the song's "killer electric guitar riffs and infectious melodies and hooks", Nichols' voice, and the lyrical content for "deal[ing] with the simple yet important values in life."

== Chart performance ==
The song has peaked at #45 on the Country Airplay chart, becoming his first single to miss the Top 40 in eighteen years.

Chart (2015–16)	Peak position
US Country Airplay (Billboard)	45
US Hot Country Songs (Billboard)	49
