= Brokenheartsville =

Single by Joe Nichols

from the album Man with a Memory
- B-side: "Can't Hold a Halo to You"
- Released: November 4, 2002
- Genre: Country
- Length: 3:51 (album version); 3:14 (single edit)
- Label: Universal South
- Songwriters: Donny Kees; Blake Mevis; Randy Boudreaux; Clint Daniels
- Producer: Brent Rowan

Joe Nichols singles chronology
| "The Impossible" (2002) | "Brokenheartsville" (2002) | "She Only Smokes When She Drinks" (2003) |

Music video
- "Brokenheartsville" on YouTube

"Brokenheartsville" is a song written by Donny Kees, Blake Mevis, Randy Boudreaux, and Clint Daniels and recorded by American country music singer Joe Nichols. It was released in November 2002 as the second single from Nichols' 2002 album Man with a Memory. The song became Nichols' first number one hit on the U.S. Billboard Hot Country Singles & Tracks (now Hot Country Songs) chart and earned him his second consecutive Grammy nomination for Best Male Country Vocal Performance. The song also was later covered by Johnny Rodriguez on his 2011 album Live from Texas.

== Critical reception ==
Wade Jessen of Billboard called the song a "beer-can-crushing, honky-tonk lament of lost love."

== Music video ==
The video starts out with Nichols' girlfriend riding off with another man in an Eldorado convertible. A depressed Nichols starts drinking at a bar in the city, and talking to the other bar patrons, singing the song. The bar patrons sitting with Nichols as well as the bartender are seen mouthing the final words of each line of the first chorus. Once the first verse ends, the bar rotates to show a popular night club.

During the second verse, Nichols takes the stage and sings the verse and two choruses with his band, as well as showing him and the bar patrons being consoled and entertained by the night clubbers, who cheer them all up when they arrived at the night club. Meanwhile, Nichols' girlfriend is still riding around with the other man in his car, which ends up breaking down, much to her dismay while the new boyfriend just shrugs his shoulders as if nothing is wrong. After Nichols finishes singing the final verse, him and his buddies return to the bar and having a drink, to which he toasts with them before taking a sip and giving a blunt face by not liking the taste. The video was filmed in downtown Nashville, Tennessee and the outside shots of the car were filmed near the Bridgestone Arena. The video was directed by Trey Fanjoy.

== Chart performance ==
"Brokenheartsville" debuted at No. 56 on the U.S. Billboard Hot Country Singles & Tracks chart for the week of November 2, 2002. The song spent 31 weeks on the chart, reaching number one for the week ending March 29, 2003, where it remained at the top spot for one week.

| Chart (2002–2003) | Peak position |
|---|---|
| US Billboard Hot 100 | 27 |
| US Hot Country Songs (Billboard) | 1 |

=== Year-end charts ===
| Chart (2003) | Position |
|---|---|
| US Country Songs (Billboard) | 8 |

== Certifications ==
| Region | Certification | Certified units/sales |
|---|---|---|
| United States (RIAA) | Platinum | 1,000,000^{‡} |
^{‡} Sales+streaming figures based on certification alone.
