= Joe Nichols =

American country music artist (born 1976)

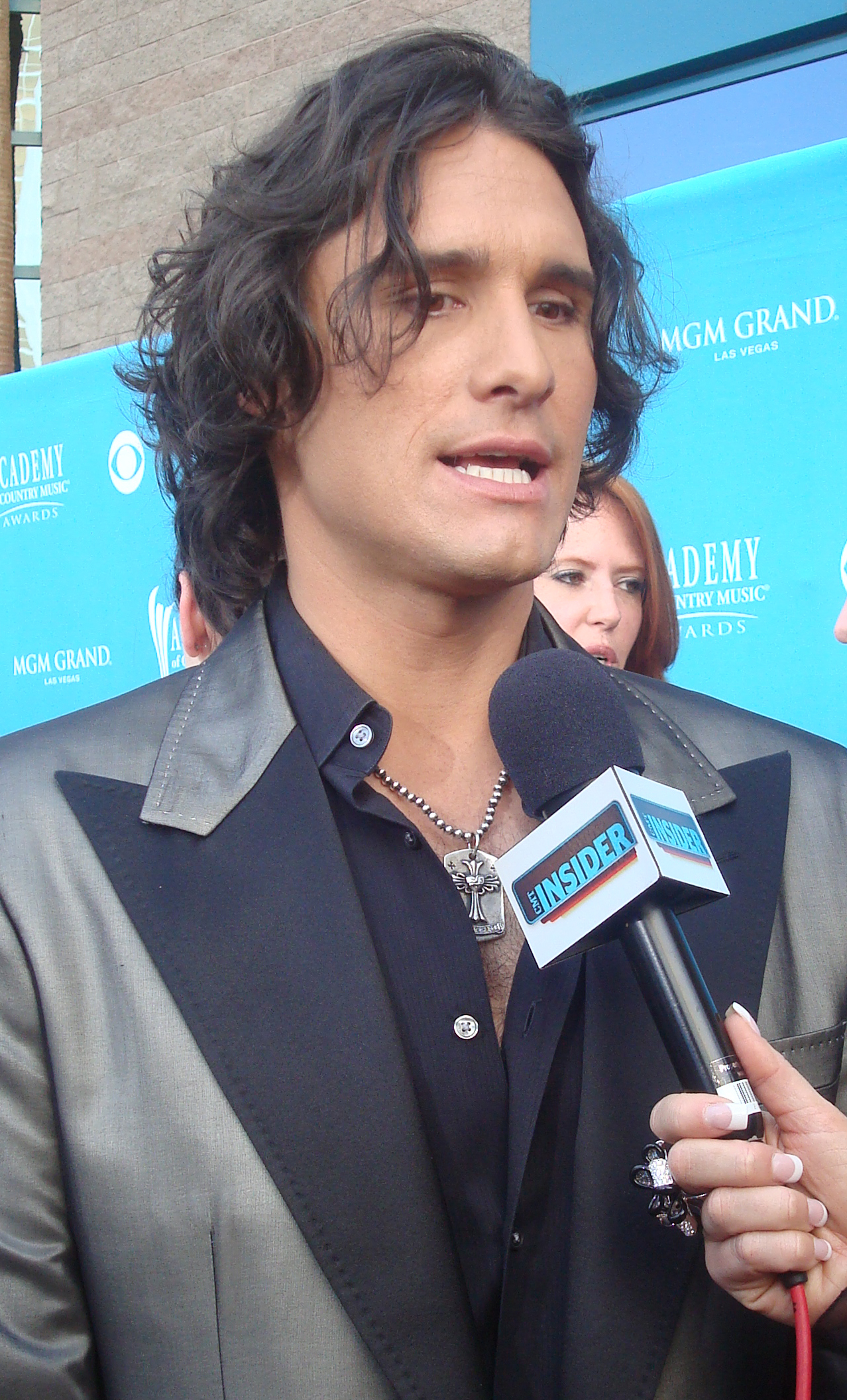
- Nichols being interviewed in 2010

Background information
- Born: Joseph Edward Nichols; November 26, 1976 (age 49)
- Origin: Rogers, Arkansas, U.S.
- Genres: Country
- Occupation: Singer
- Instruments: Vocals; guitar
- Years active: 1996–present
- Labels: Intersound, Show Dog-Universal, Red Bow, Quartz Hill

Joseph Edward Nichols (born November 26, 1976) is an American country music artist. Between 1996 and 2001, he held recording contracts with the Intersound and Giant labels. In 2002, he signed with Universal South Records, now known as Show Dog-Universal Music.

Nichols began his career with The Rodeo Band, playing in high school gymnasiums and small clubs. Throughout the course of his career, Nichols has released eleven studio albums: Joe Nichols (1996), Man with a Memory (2002), Revelation (2004), III (2005), Real Things (2007), Old Things New (2009), It's All Good (2011), Crickets (2013), Never Gets Old (2017), Good Day for Living (2022), and Honky Tonks & Country Songs (2024). These albums have produced over 14 Top 40 singles on the Billboard Hot Country Songs and Country Airplay charts, including the Number One singles "Brokenheartsville", "Tequila Makes Her Clothes Fall Off", "Gimmie That Girl", "Sunny and 75", and the RIAA GOLD-certified single "Yeah", as well as five other Top 10 entries.

In October 2012, Nichols signed to Red Bow, a new partnership of Broken Bow Records and RED Distribution.

== Biography ==
Joe Nichols was born and raised in Rogers, Arkansas. He was the second son born to Michael Curtis Nichols and Robin Larson Nichols. Joe has an older brother, Michael Curtis Jr., and two younger sisters, Kelli Francis and Lacey Nichols. His father, who worked as a trucker, also played bass guitar in local country bands; eventually, Nichols himself found work in a local rock band before taking a job as a country disc jockey. His father was part Cherokee, and his mother is part Comanche.

Nichols moved to Walnut Cove, North Carolina, and attended the local high school, South Stokes High School. His father died in 2002 after battling idiopathic pulmonary fibrosis (IPF) for six years.

== Musical career ==
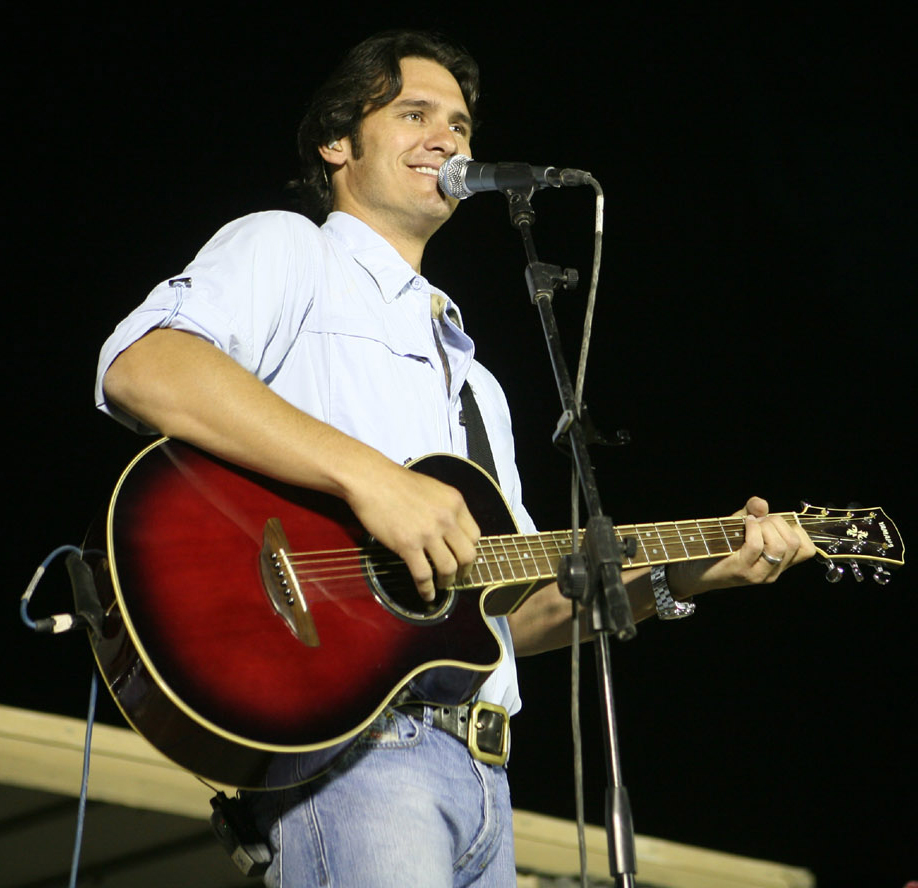
Nichols in 2009

Through a meeting with record producer Randy Edwards, Nichols began to work on his singing and songwriting skills. At age 19, he was signed to his first record deal with an independent label known as Intersound Records. There, Nichols released his first album, 1996's Joe Nichols. Despite the minor success of its lead-off single "Six of One, Half a Dozen of the Other" (which reached No. 74 on the RPM country charts in Canada), the album sold poorly, and he was dropped from Intersound's roster. A second record deal, this time with Giant Records, was short-lived and did not produce any singles or albums. After his short-lived record deals, he took many jobs in Nashville, including moving furniture, installing cable TV systems, and selling steaks door to door.

=== 1999–2004: Man with a Memory ===
In 1999, Nichols met Brent Rowan, a Nashville session guitarist who helped him land a recording contract with Universal South Records (which became Show Dog-Universal Music in December 2009). In July 2002, his second album, entitled Man with a Memory, was released. Its lead-off single, "The Impossible", became a No. 3 hit on the Billboard Hot Country Singles & Tracks (now Hot Country Songs) charts, and was declared by Billboard as the tenth most-played country song of 2003. The same year, his debut album was reissued under the title Six of One, Half a Dozen of the Other.

Man with a Memory earned Nichols a Top New Male Vocalist award from the Academy of Country Music, as well as three Grammy Award nominations and platinum certification from the Recording Industry Association of America (RIAA). Its second single, "Brokenheartsville", became his first No. 1 hit on the Billboard country charts in 2003, while "She Only Smokes When She Drinks" and "Cool to Be a Fool" both reached the Top 20. Also in 2003, Nichols received the Country Music Association's Horizon Award.

=== 2004–2008: Revelation, III, and Real Things ===
Nichols spent most of 2004 on tour with Alan Jackson. In June of that year, he issued his third studio album, Revelation. It produced two Top Ten hits in "If Nobody Believed in You" and "What's a Guy Gotta Do", at No. 10 and No. 4, respectively. Later that same year, he also issued an album of Christmas music, entitled A Traditional Christmas. Four of the tracks from this album received enough airplay to enter the country charts.

III was Nichols' fourth album and was released in October 2005. Its lead-off single and his signature song, "Tequila Makes Her Clothes Fall Off," became his second Billboard number one hit. The single went triple platinum and the album received a Gold certification from the RIAA. The album also produced the Top Ten hits "Size Matters (Someday)" and "I'll Wait for You", at No. 9 and No. 7, respectively. In 2005, Anna Nicole Smith met Nichols at the Grand Ole Opry, and she became a fan. After Smith's death, he performed two songs ("Wings of a Dove" and "I'll Wait for You") at her funeral service. Nichols joined Toby Keith on tours in both 2005 and 2006.

Nichols' fifth album, Real Things, was released in August 2007. Its two singles, Another Side of You" and "It Ain't No Crime," were both Top 20 country hits. The album also included a cover of "Let's Get Drunk and Fight," which Canadian singer Aaron Lines released as a single in 2008.

=== 2008–2012: Old Things New and It's All Good ===
Nichols released a new single, "Believers," to radio on March 27, 2009. Written by Ashley Gorley, Wade Kirby, and Bill Luther, it was the first single from his sixth album, Old Things New. The song failed to reach the Top 20, reaching a peak of number 26. However, the album's second single, "Gimmie That Girl," became Nichols' third Number One hit on the country charts in May 2010. The album's third single, "The Shape I'm In," was released in July 2010 and peaked at number 17 on the country charts.

Following a merger with his label and Show Dog Records, It's All Good was his seventh album released on November 8, 2011, via Show Dog-Universal Music. The album's only single, "Take It Off", peaked at number 25 on the country charts, and Nichols parted ways with Show Dog-Universal in May 2012.

=== 2012–2018: Crickets and Never Gets Old ===
After parting ways with his longtime label, Nichols signed in October 2012 to Red Bow, a new partnership of Broken Bow Records and RED Distribution.

On April 22, 2013, "Sunny and 75" premiered exclusively online at AOL's The Boot. The song was available on iTunes on May 7, 2013. On Monday, May 13, it was announced that the song had the biggest country radio add week of his entire career, with 52 first-week adds. It peaked at number one on the Country Airplay chart in December 2013. Nichols' eighth studio album, Crickets, was released on October 8, 2013. On January 9, 2014, it was announced that "Sunny and 75" was certified Gold by the RIAA for single sales in excess of 500,000 digital downloads. The album's second single, "Yeah", was released to country radio on January 27, 2014. It reached number one on the Country Airplay chart in July 2014. The album's third single, "Hard to Be Cool", was released to country radio on September 1, 2014.

In 2014, Nichols sang, together with Lucy Hale, the song "Red Dress", which appeared on her album Road Between.

It was announced on Nichols' website that the lead single to his ninth studio album, titled "Freaks Like Me", would be released to digital retailers on September 18, 2015, and to radio on September 21, 2015. Nichols released the new single "Undone" on May 13, 2016 and released his ninth studio album Never Gets Old on July 28, 2017, on Broken Bow Records. "Freaks Like Me" and "Undone" are not included on the new album. Joe parted ways with Broken Bow Music Group in August 2018.

Nichols final release for Broken Bow was Never Gets Old: Traditional Country Series, a six-song EP that featured covers of famous country songs, like Don Williams' "Good Ole Boys Like Me", Merle Haggard's "Sing Me Back Home", and Keith Whitley's "Ten Feet Away".

=== 2018–2024: Good Day for Living and Honky Tonks & Country Songs ===
On April 5, 2021, Nichols signed a label deal with Quartz Hill Records. On May 10, 2021, Nichols released "Home Run", his first single since 2018's "Billy Graham's Bible". The song impacted country radio on May 10.

Nichols' likeness, along with the Quartz Hills logo, was featured on the #8 car of Tyler Reddick at NASCAR's Goodyear 400 race at Darlington Raceway on May 9, 2021.

In November 2021, Nichols announced his tenth studio album, Good Day for Living, which marked his first full-length release in five years since Never Gets Old was released in 2017. The album was released on February 11, 2022, and featured three singles: "Home Run", the album's title track, and "Brokenhearted". The title track was Nichols' first top 20 hit since "Yeah" topped the charts in 2014. "I Wanna Be Your Tonight" and "Screened In" were also released as promotional singles.

On August 27, 2024, Nichols announced his eleventh studio album, Honky Tonks & Country Songs, which was preceded by three singles: "Bottle It Up", released on July 19, 2024, "Doin' Life with You", released on September 6, 2024, and "Better Than You", a duet with Annie Bosko on September 27, 2024. "Better Than You" was a top-five most-added song on country radio for four consecutive weeks, as the single reached 44 on Country Airplay.

=== 2025–present: Upcoming EP and twelfth studio album ===
On October 10, 2025, Nichols released "Goodbyes Are Hard to Listen To", the first promotional single to his upcoming twelfth studio album, which was initially due late 2026 before being pushed to early 2027. He described the song as a return to form, crediting Zach Top for allowing traditional country to make a return. Nichols released the album's second promotional single, "Fighting the Good Fight", on February 20, 2026. The third promotional single, "High Notes", was released on May 1, 2026, and, alongside "Fighting the Good Fight", was Nichols' first co-writing credits since 2017 and his first releases he has ever co-produced.

In the summer edition of Country Aircheck, Billy Macky of Quartz Hill announced that Nichols was set to release a new EP in the third quarter of 2026 alongside a new radio single. In July 2026, Nichols announced "Say La V", his first radio single since October 2024 and the lead single to his new EP, with an impact date of July 20, 2026.

== Personal life ==
On January 8, 2005, Nichols returned to Nashville to see a therapist after causing a scene in Steamboat Springs, Colorado, while intoxicated on amphetamines and alcohol. He had been battling an addiction since 2002 after the death of his father. On October 13, 2007, Nichols was checked into a substance abuse rehabilitation program.

Nichols married Heather Singleton on September 9, 2007, in Savannah, Georgia. He had known Singleton since they were 19 years old. The couple has two daughters. Nichols also has another daughter, born in 1998, from a previous relationship.

Nichols is a lifelong fan of the St. Louis Cardinals.

== Discography ==
Studio albums

- Joe Nichols (1996)
- Man with a Memory (2002)
- Revelation (2004)
- III (2005)
- Real Things (2007)
- Old Things New (2009)
- It's All Good (2011)
- Crickets (2013)
- Never Gets Old (2017)
- Good Day for Living (2022)
- Honky Tonks & Country Songs (2024)
