= Crickets (Joe Nichols album) =

Studio album by Joe Nichols
- Released: October 8, 2013
- Genre: Country
- Length: 55:25
- Label: Red Bow Records
- Producers: Mickey Jack Cones; Derek George; Tony Brown

Joe Nichols chronology
It's All Good (2011)	Crickets (2013)	Never Gets Old (2017)

Singles from Crickets
- 1. "Sunny and 75" Released: May 13, 2013; 2. "Yeah" Released: January 27, 2014; 3. "Hard to Be Cool" Released: September 1, 2014

Crickets is the eighth studio album by American country music artist Joe Nichols, released on October 8, 2013 by Red Bow Records. It includes a cover of Merle Haggard's "Footlights". The album sold 12,330 albums its first week.

Mickey Jack Cones produced the entire album, co-producing with Tony Brown on "Yeah" and "Billy Graham's Bible", and Derek George on all other tracks.

== Critical reception ==
Professional ratings
Review scores
Source	Rating
AllMusic	3/5 stars
Country Weekly	B
Digital Journal	A+
Roughstock	4/5 stars

Crickets garnered generally positive reception from the ratings and reviews of music critics. Stephen Thomas Erlewine of AllMusic rated the album three stars out of five, remarking how "All of Crickets is peppered with these kind of off-hand references to the modern world, but Nichols' true tell is the bright, affable sound of the record, how it finds a cozy middle ground between his burnished signature and the hyper-stylized, over-sized country of new millennial sports bars." In addition, Erlewine says "his true strengths are rooted in the past, not the present." At Country Weekly, Jon Freeman graded the album a B, indicating how "At times, the overstuffed (at 16 tracks) album struggles to keep the memorable hooks coming, opting instead for generic tales of women on creek banks." Also, Freeman writes that "the beloved neotraditionalist may surprise some listeners by trying on some contemporary clothes." Markos Papadatos of Digital Journal graded the album an A+, highlighting how the listener "can really hear Nichols' heart on this album and his love for the country genre" because Nichols' "leaves his fans yearning for more." Furthermore, Papadatos states Nichols' is "stronger than ever" on a release that "contains 16 songs", which "is a real treat and its production is brilliant." At Roughstock, Ashley Cooke rated the album four stars out of five, calling Nichols' a "completely underrated" musician, and this is evidenced by the "jammed packed album with many different songs and while some of the songs do fall within the cliché of country music out there, the delivery is different", which this is done with a "sound [that] is authentic and his vocals are smooth."

== Track listing ==
No.	Title	Writer(s)	Length
1.	"Just Let Me Fall in Love with You"	Brett Beavers; Steve Bogard; Ryan Tyndell	3:50
2.	"Hard to Be Cool"	Rob Hatch; Jason Sellers	3:06
3.	"Baby You're in Love with Me"	Dylan Altman; Eric Paslay; Chris Wallin	2:51
4.	"Yeah"	Ashley Gorley; Bryan Simpson	2:33
5.	"Billy Graham's Bible"	Neal Coty; Chris DuBois; Jimmy Melton	3:55
6.	"Better Than Beautiful"	Jason Delkou; Rich Herring	3:37
7.	"Gotta Love It"	Dave Berg; Marla Cannon-Goodman; Clay Mills	3:11
8.	"Sunny and 75"	Michael Dulaney; Paul Jenkins; Sellers	3:27
9.	"Y'ant To"	Justin Wilson	2:52
10.	"Hee Haw"	Michael P. Heeney; Tammi Kidd Hutton	2:31
11.	"Love Has a Way"	Bogard; John Edwards; Jason Sever	2:43
12.	"Smile on Mine"	Rhett Akins; Dallas Davidson; Ben Hayslip	2:43
13.	"Open Up a Can"	Davidson; Gorley; Kelley Lovelace	3:17
14.	"Old School Country Song"	Jim Collins; Rivers Rutherford	4:45
15.	"Footlights"	Merle Haggard	4:13
16.	"Crickets"	Brent Baxter; Lisa Shaffer; Bill Whyte	3:36
Total length:			55:25

== Personnel ==
- Eddie Bayers - drums
- The Brentwood Good Ole Boys Choir - background vocals on "Open Up a Can"
- Pat Buchanan - electric guitar
- Mickey Jack Cones - acoustic guitar, electric guitar, percussion, background vocals
- J.T. Corenflos - electric guitar
- Scott Ducaj - trumpet on "Gotta Love It"
- Jeneé Fleenor - fiddle
- Larry Franklin - fiddle, mandolin
- Paul Franklin - steel guitar
- Derek George - acoustic guitar, electric guitar, keyboards, programming, background vocals
- Kenny Greenberg - acoustic guitar
- Tony Harrell - keyboards
- Aubrey Haynie - fiddle, mandolin
- Wes Hightower - background vocals
- Mark Hill - bass guitar
- Jim Horn - baritone saxophone and tenor saxophone on "Gotta Love It"
- Mike Johnson - steel guitar, dobro on "Crickets"
- Troy Lancaster - electric guitar
- B. James Lowry - acoustic guitar, 10-string acoustic guitar, ganjo
- Brent Mason - electric guitar
- Steve Nathan - Hammond B-3 organ, keyboards
- Joe Nichols - lead vocals
- Russ Pahl - steel guitar
- Charles Rose - trombone on "Gotta Love It"
- Jimmie Lee Sloas - bass guitar
- Bryan Sutton - acoustic guitar
- Biff Watson - acoustic guitar
- The Wild Wild Western Women - background vocals on "Open Up a Can"
- Lonnie Wilson - drums
- Casey Wood - percussion, programming
- Glenn Worf - bass guitar

== Chart performance ==
=== Album ===
Chart (2013)	Peak position
US Billboard 200	17
US Top Country Albums (Billboard)	3
US Independent Albums (Billboard)	4

=== Singles ===
Year	Single	Peak chart positions				
Year	Single	US Country	US Country Airplay	US	CAN Country	CAN
2013	"Sunny and 75"	4	1	39	1	49
2014	"Yeah"	7	1	41	1	48
2014	"Hard to Be Cool"	32	22	—	50	—
