= Yeah (Joe Nichols song) =

Single by Joe Nichols

from the album Crickets
- Released: January 27, 2014
- Recorded: 2013
- Genre: Country
- Length: 3:51
- Label: Red Bow
- Songwriters: Ashley Gorley; Bryan Simpson
- Producers: Mickey Jack Cones; Tony Brown

Joe Nichols singles chronology
"Sunny and 75" (2013)	"Yeah" (2014)	"Hard to Be Cool" (2014)

"Yeah" is a song recorded by American country music artist Joe Nichols. It was released in January 2014 as his second single for Red Bow Records and from his eighth studio album Crickets (2013). The song, written by Ashley Gorley and Bryan Simpson, is about a man having a one night stand in the summer with a woman.

"Yeah" gave Nichols his fifth number-one hit on the Billboard Country Airplay chart and his second top 10 hit on the Hot Country Songs chart at number 7. It also charted outside the Hot 100, peaking at number 41. The song was certified Gold by the Recording Industry Association of America (RIAA), and has sold 612,000 units in the United States as of September 2014. It achieved similar chart success in Canada, giving Nichols his second number-one hit on the Country chart and number 48 on the Canadian Hot 100.

An accompanying music video for the song was directed by Wes Edwards.

== Content ==
The song is a mid-tempo about a man experiencing a summer night with a woman. Throughout, he responds to various situations with the word "Yeah".

== Reception ==
=== Critical ===
Giving it a "B", Tammy Ragusa of Country Weekly praised the production: "there's something about that opening riff and midtempo, thumping groove that hints toward all of the warm-weather goodness that the impending summer holds—without being an in-your-face bikinis, babes and brews blaster." She also praised the "warmth" of Nichols' voice.

=== Commercial ===
"Yeah" debuted at number 59 on the U.S. Billboard Country Airplay chart for the week of January 25, 2014, at number 44 on the U.S. Billboard Hot Country Songs chart for the week of March 1, 2014, and at number 98 on the U.S. Billboard Hot 100 chart for the week of May 10, 2014. The song was certified Platinum by the RIAA on December 16, 2024. As of September 2014, It had sold 612,000 copies in the U.S.

The song also debuted at number 48 on the Canadian Hot 100 chart for the week of June 21, 2014.

== Music video ==
The music video was directed by Wes Edwards and premiered in May 2014.

== Charts and certifications ==
=== Weekly charts ===
Chart (2014)	Peak position
Canada Hot 100 (Billboard)	48
Canada Country (Billboard)	1
US Billboard Hot 100	41
US Country Airplay (Billboard)	1
US Hot Country Songs (Billboard)	7

=== Year-end charts ===
Chart (2014)	Position
US Country Airplay (Billboard)	11
US Hot Country Songs (Billboard)	26

=== Certifications ===
Region	Certification	Certified units/sales
United States (RIAA)	Platinum	612,000
