= Brent Rowan =

- Born: May 28, 1956 (age 68); Waxahachie, Texas
- Origin: Nashville, Tennessee
- Genres: Country
- Occupation(s): Session musician Record producer
- Instrument: Guitar
- Years active: 1980–present

Brent Rowan (born May 28, 1956, in Waxahachie, Texas) is an American session musician and record producer who works primarily in country music. Active since the 1970s, Rowan began working with John Conlee through the recommendation of record producer Bud Logan. Rowan first played on Conlee's "Friday Night Blues", and later became the only guitarist for Conlee's recordings.

He also played guitar for Alabama, Alan Jackson, Chris LeDoux, Clay Walker, Confederate Railroad, Bob Seger, Josh Turner and others. In 1989, Rowan was awarded Guitarist of the Year by Academy of Country Music.

Rowan produced Joe Nichols' Man with a Memory. He has also produced for McHayes, Julie Roberts, and Blake Shelton.
