= Gord Bamford discography =

- Studio albums: 9
- Singles: 39
- Music videos: 20

Gord Bamford is a Canadian country music artist. His discography comprises eight studio albums and thirty-nine singles. He has accumulated seventeen top ten hits on the Canada Country airplay chart, including two number one singles.

== Studio albums ==
=== 2000s ===
| Title | Details |
|---|---|
| God's Green Earth | Release date: January 3, 2001; Label: GWB/Royalty Records |
| Life Is Good | Release date: October 19, 2004; Label: GWB/Royalty Records |
| Honkytonks and Heartaches | Release date: September 25, 2007; Label: Royalty Records |

=== 2010s ===
| Title | Details | Peak positions | Certifications (sales threshold) |
| Title | Details | CAN | Certifications (sales threshold) |
|---|---|---|---|
| Day Job | Release date: April 6, 2010; Label: Royalty Records | — | |
| Is It Friday Yet? | Release date: March 6, 2012; Label: Sony Music Canada | — | MC: Gold |
| Country Junkie | Release date: October 8, 2013; Label: Sony Music Canada | 11 | MC: Gold |
| Christmas in Canada | Release date: November 5, 2013; Label: Sony Music Canada | — | MC: Platinum |
| Tin Roof | Release date: April 8, 2016; Label: Sony Music Canada | 16 | |
| Neon Smoke | Release date: January 19, 2018; Label: Cache Entertainment, Sony Music Canada | 82 | |
"—" denotes releases that did not chart

=== 2020s ===
| Title | Details | Peak positions |
| Title | Details | CAN |
|---|---|---|
| Diamonds in a Whiskey Glass | Release date: June 4, 2021; Label: Cache, Anthem Records | 29 |
| Fire It Up | Release date: April 28, 2023; Label: Cache, Anthem Records | — |

== Singles ==
=== 1990s–2000s ===
| Year | Title | Peak positions | | Certifications (sales threshold) | Album |
| Year | Title | CAN | CAN Country | Certifications (sales threshold) | Album |
|---|---|---|---|---|---|
| 1996 | "Forever Starts Today" | — | — | | Non-album single |
| 2001 | "24 x 24" | — | × | | God's Green Earth |
| 2001 | "Where a Cowboy Likes to Roam" | — | × | | God's Green Earth |
| 2001 | "God's Green Earth" | — | × | | God's Green Earth |
| 2002 | "Man of the House" | — | × | | God's Green Earth |
| 2002 | "Classic Country Song" | — | × | | God's Green Earth |
| 2004 | "Heroes" | — | 11 | | Life Is Good |
| 2004 | "My Heart's a Genius" | — | 16 | | Life Is Good |
| 2005 | "All About Her" | — | 17 | | Life Is Good |
| 2005 | "Life Is Good" | — | 12 | | Life Is Good |
| 2006 | "I Would for You" | — | 17 | | Life Is Good |
| 2006 | "We're All Cowboys" | — | 21 | | Life Is Good |
| 2007 | "Blame It On That Red Dress" | 66 | 6 | MC: Gold | Honkytonks and Heartaches |
| 2008 | "Stayed 'Til Two" | 83 | 6 | | Honkytonks and Heartaches |
| 2008 | "Postcard from Pasadena" | 78 | 7 | | Honkytonks and Heartaches |
| 2009 | "Little Guy" | 78 | 10 | | Honkytonks and Heartaches |
| 2009 | "Drinkin' Buddy" | 83 | 12 | MC: Gold | Honkytonks and Heartaches |
| 2009 | "Hurtin' Me Back" | 100 | 11 | | Honkytonks and Heartaches |
"—" denotes releases that did not chart "×" indicates that no relevant chart existed or was archived

=== 2010s ===
| Year | Title | Peak chart positions | | Certifications (sales threshold) | Album |
| Year | Title | CAN | CAN Country | Certifications (sales threshold) | Album |
|---|---|---|---|---|---|
| 2010 | "Day Job" | — | 8 | | Day Job |
| 2010 | "Put Some Alcohol On It" | 87 | 9 | | Day Job |
| 2010 | "My Daughter's Father" | 94 | 12 | | Day Job |
| 2011 | "Hank Williams Lonesome" | — | 9 | | Day Job |
| 2012 | "Is It Friday Yet?" | 86 | 9 | MC: Gold | Is It Friday Yet? |
| 2012 | "Leaning on a Lonesome Song" | 79 | 8 | | Is It Friday Yet? |
| 2012 | "Disappearing Tail Lights" | — | 12 | | Is It Friday Yet? |
| 2013 | "Farm Girl Strong" | 91 | 11 | | Is It Friday Yet? |
| 2013 | "Must Be a Woman" | — | 19 | | Is It Friday Yet? |
| 2013 | "When Your Lips Are So Close" | 42 | 1 | MC: Platinum | Country Junkie |
| 2014 | "Unreal" | 77 | 10 | | Country Junkie |
| 2014 | "Where a Farm Used to Be" | 77 | 8 | | Country Junkie |
| 2014 | "Groovin' with You" | — | 17 | | Country Junkie |
| 2015 | "Don't Let Her Be Gone" | 88 | 3 | MC: Gold | Tin Roof |
| 2016 | "Heard You in a Song" | — | 7 | | Tin Roof |
| 2016 | "Breakfast Beer" | — | 17 | MC: Gold | Tin Roof |
| 2016 | "Fall in Love If You Want To" | — | 13 | | Tin Roof |
| 2017 | "Livin' on Summertime" | — | 5 | | Neon Smoke |
| 2017 | "Ain't It Grand" (featuring Jim Cuddy) | — | 41 | | Neon Smoke |
| 2018 | "Neon Smoke" | — | 10 | | Neon Smoke |
| 2018 | "Dive Bar" | — | 1 | MC: Gold | Neon Smoke |
| 2019 | "#Rednek" | — | 12 | | #Rednek |
"—" denotes releases that did not chart

=== 2020s ===
| Year | Title | Peak chart positions | Album |
| Year | Title | CAN Country | Album |
|---|---|---|---|
| 2020 | "Just Let Go" | 37 | #Rednek |
| 2020 | "Diamonds in a Whiskey Glass" | 20 | Diamonds in a Whiskey Glass |
| 2021 | "Heaven on Dirt" | 21 | Diamonds in a Whiskey Glass |
| 2021 | "Drink Along Song" (solo or featuring The Wolfe Brothers) | 9 | Diamonds in a Whiskey Glass |
| 2022 | "I Ain't Drunk" (featuring Terri Clark) | 38 | Diamonds in a Whiskey Glass |
| 2023 | "One Heartbeat From Heaven" | 48 | Fire It Up |
| 2023 | "Fire It Up“ | 50 | Fire It Up |
| 2023 | "Canadian Dirt" | 56 | Fire It Up |
| 2023 | "Hair of the Honky Tonk Dog" (Note: "Hair of the Honky Tonk Dog" has only been released to radio in Australia.) | — | Fire It Up |
| 2024 | "Just Gettin' Started" | — | TBA |
| 2025 | "Cowboys Were Kings" | 40 | TBA |
| 2025 | "As Long as There's a Bar" | 55 | TBA |
"—" denotes releases that did not chart or were not released to that territory

=== Guest singles ===
| Year | Title | Artist | Album |
|---|---|---|---|
| 2010 | "The Night Ain't Over Yet" | Chad Klinger | The Man I Am Inside |

== Other charted songs ==
| Year | Single | Peak positions | Album |
| Year | Single | CAN Country | Album |
|---|---|---|---|
| 2010 | "Baseball Glove" | 44 | Christmas in Canada |
| 2018 | "Christmas in the Sun" | 46 | Non-album single |

== Music videos ==
| Year | Video | Director |
|---|---|---|
| 2004 | "My Heart's a Genius" | Colin Cunningham |
| 2005 | "All About Her" | Joel Stewart |
| 2007 | "Blame It On That Red Dress" | Stephano Barberis |
| 2008 | "Stayed 'Til Two" | Stephano Barberis |
| 2008 | "Postcard from Pasadena" | Stephano Barberis |
| 2009 | "Little Guy" | Stephano Barberis |
| 2009 | "Baseball Glove" | Stephano Barberis |
| 2010 | "Day Job" | |
| 2010 | "Put Some Alcohol On It" | Stephano Barberis |
| 2010 | "My Daughters Father" | John Kerr |
| 2011 | "Hank Williams Lonesome" | |
| 2012 | "Is It Friday Yet?" | Stephano Barberis |
| 2012 | "Leaning on a Lonesome Song" | |
| 2012 | "Disappearing Tail Lights" | |
| 2013 | "Farm Girl Strong" | |
| 2013 | "When Your Lips Are So Close" | Stephano Barberis |
| 2014 | "Unreal" | Stephano Barberis |
| 2014 | "Where a Farm Used to Be" | Harv Glazer |
| 2014 | "Groovin' with You" | Harv Glazer |
| 2015 | "Don't Let Her Be Gone" | Stephano Barberis |
| 2016 | "Heard You in a Song" | |
| 2016 | "Breakfast Beer" | Blake McWilliam |
| 2016 | "Where a Farm Used to Be" | |
| 2016 | "Fall in Love If You Want To | |
| 2017 | "Tin Roof" | |
| 2017 | "Livin' on Summertime" | |
| 2017 | "Ain't It Grand" | |
| 2018 | "Neon Smoke" | |
| 2018 | "Dive Bar Official" | |
| 2018 | "Down" | |
| 2019 | "#Rednek" | |
| 2020 | "Just Let Go" | Mac Roy |
| 2020 | "Diamonds in a Whiskey Glass" | Stephano Barberis |
| 2021 | "Drink Along Song" | |
