= Honkytonks and Heartaches =

Studio album by Gord Bamford
- Released: September 25, 2007
- Genre: Country
- Length: 42:20
- Label: Royalty
- Producers: Gord Bamford; Byron Hill

Gord Bamford chronology
Life Is Good (2005)	Honkytonks and Heartaches (2007)	Day Job (2010)

Honkytonks and Heartaches is the third studio album by Canadian country music artist Gord Bamford. It was released on September 25, 2007 by Royalty Records.

The album was nominated for a 2008 Juno Award for Country Recording of the Year.

== Track listing ==
1. "Blame It On That Red Dress" (Gord Bamford, Byron Hill, Zack Turner) – 3:12
2. "Postcard From Pasadena" (Gord Bamford, Byron Hill) – 2:48
3. "Blue Collar Place" (Gord Bamford, Duane Steele) – 3:24
4. "Little Guy" (Gord Bamford) – 3:42
5. "Stayed 'Til Two" (Gord Bamford, Byron Hill) – 2:19
6. "I Said Nothing" (Gord Bamford, Byron Hill, Tim Taylor) – 3:39
7. "Drinkin' Buddy" (Gord Bamford, Byron Hill, Mark Irwin) – 2:51
8. "Come Over Here" (Gord Bamford, Byron Hill, Tim Taylor) – 3:11
9. "In the Palm of Your Hands" (Gord Bamford, Dave Gunning) – 3:20
10. "Hurtin' Me Back" (Gord Bamford, Gil Grand) – 3:37
11. "Honkytonks and Heartaches" (Gord Bamford, Byron Hill) – 4:01
12. "Things Go Better with Love" (Gord Bamford, Byron Hill, Zack Turner) – 3:20
13. "Years Ago Last Night" (Gord Bamford, Byron Hill, Mike Dekle) – 2:56
  - duet with Jessie Farrell
