= God's Green Earth =

Album by Gord Bamford

Studio album by Gord Bamford
- Released: January 3, 2001
- Recorded: 2000
- Genre: Country
- Length: 34:50
- Label: GWB
- Producer: Bart McKay

Gord Bamford chronology
God's Green Earth (2001)	Life Is Good (2004)

Professional ratings
Review scores
Source	Rating
Canadian Online Explorer	(positive)

God's Green Earth is the first studio album by Canadian country music artist Gord Bamford. It was released in January 2001 by GWB Records and distributed by Royalty Records. Five songs were released from the project - "God's Green Earth," "24 x 24," "Where a Cowboy Likes to Roam," "Man of the House" and "Classic Country Song."

== Critical reception ==
Fish Griwkowsky of Canadian Online Explorer gave the album a positive review. He said that Bamford has "put out a good album, one which can honestly be called country music." He calls the song "24 x 24" an obvious hit and states that Bamford sounds "alive and energetic." He goes on to say that he "wastes a little time on the ballads, a fact of life in this business, but uses the talented Duane Steele to certain advantage as the songwriter on "Starting All Over Again". Peter North of Edmonton Journal gave the album a positive review. He said that "if you didn't have a clue who this rugged looking singer and sometime songwriter was, all you would have to do is take a quick glance down the back cover of his God's Green Earth disc to understand that he's been plugged into the scene. For instance, names like Duane Steele, Gil Grand, Ray Griff and Steve Fox (not to mention Vernon Rust, Byron Hill and Odie Blackmon) are prominent on the songwriting credits, and none of those gentlemen hand their material over to just anyone."

== Track listing ==
1. "24 x 24" (Steve Fox) - 3:29
2. "God's Green Earth" (Odie Blackmon, Gil Grand, Byron Hill) - 2:56
3. "Where a Cowboy Likes to Roam" (Gord Bamford, Blake Bell) - 4:09
4. "Man of the House" (Vernon Rust) - 4:20
5. "Starting All Over Again" (Roy Hurd, Duane Steele) - 3:12
6. "Wish I Did What He Did" (Gil Grand, Byron Hill, Simone Legrandeur) - 2:39
7. "State I'm In" (Jim Robbinson, Duane Steele) - 2:41
8. "There's a Ring to It" (Ray Griff, Craig Young) - 3:22
9. "Classic Country Song" (Cyril Rawson, Duane Steele) - 3:06
10. "Chevy Truck" (Matthew Atkins, Gord Bamford, Blake Bell) - 3:48
