= Life Is Good (Gord Bamford album) =

Studio album by Gord Bamford
- Released: October 19, 2004
- Recorded: March 22–23, 2004
- Genre: Country
- Length: 34:50
- Label: GWB
- Producers: Gord Bamford; Byron Hill

Gord Bamford chronology
God's Green Earth (2001)	Life Is Good (2004)	Honkytonks and Heartaches (2007)

Professional ratings
Review scores
Source	Rating
Canadian Online Explorer	(positive)

Life Is Good is the second studio album by Canadian country music artist Gord Bamford. It was released on October 19, 2004 by GWB Records and distributed by Royalty Records. Six singles were released from the album: "Heroes," "My Heart's a Genius," "All About Her," "Life Is Good" and "I Would for You."

== Critical reception ==
Jared Majeski of Canadian Online Explorer gave the album a positive review. He calls the album "a very personal and intimate look into Bamford's life." He goes on to say that Bamford "sings about his parents, his past and his passions. With the recent birth of his first child, Bamford's life isn't just good - it's great."

== Track listing ==
1. "Heroes" (Gord Bamford, Casey Moore, Dean Pezderic, Duane Steele) - 3:22
2. "My Heart's a Genius" (Gord Bamford, Byron Hill) - 3:24
3. "Politically Incorrect" (Gord Bamford, Byron Hill) - 3:27
4. "Joe's Place" (Mike Dekle, Byron Hill) - 2:37
5. "All About Her" (Gord Bamford, Steve Fox) - 3:31
6. "I Would for You" (Gord Bamford, Byron Hill) - 3:20
7. "Stubborn Blood" (Gord Bamford, Steve Fox, Tim Taylor) - 3:08
8. "We're All Cowboys" (Gord Bamford, Byron Hill) - 3:30
9. "Life Is Good" (Gord Bamford, Byron Hill) - 2:50
10. "The Watering Hole" (Gord Bamford, Byron Hill) - 2:26
11. "Kendra's Song" (Gord Bamford, Tim Taylor) - 3:15

== Personnel ==
- Gord Bamford - lead vocals
- Jeff Bradshaw - steel guitar
- Jimmy Carter - bass guitar
- J.T. Corenflos - electric guitar
- Ryan Davidson - acoustic guitar, electric guitar
- Glen Duncan - fiddle, mandolin, banjo
- Brad Johner - background vocals
- Becky Moonen - background vocals
- Billy Panda - acoustic guitar
- Mike Rojas - organ, piano, synthesizer, Wurlitzer
- Paul Scholten - drums, percussion
