= The Boom Chucka Boys =

Canadian country/rockabilly band

- Origin: Sylvan Lake, Alberta, Canada
- Genres: Country, rockabilly
- Years active: 2010–present
- Labels: Cache Entertainment, Royalty
- Members: Ryan Langlois; Joel Rathjen; Teddy Roy Michaylow; Ben Shillabeer; Neil MacDonald
- Past members: Dave Grobe
- Website: theboomchuckaboys.com

The Boom Chucka Boys is a Canadian country and rockabilly band from Sylvan Lake, Alberta composed of Ryan Langlois, Joel Rathjen, Teddy Roy Michaylow, Ben Shillabeer and Neil MacDonald. The band was formed in July 2010. They were discovered by Gord Bamford in January 2011 and signed a record deal with his company, Cache Entertainment.

Their self-titled debut album was released in April 2013 and distributed by Sony Music Canada. It was produced by Byron Hill and recorded in Nashville, Tennessee. The first single, "Find My Peace of Mind", was released in March 2013 and peaked at number 43 on the Billboard Canada Country chart. In 2014, The Boom Chucka Boys were nominated for the Canadian Country Music Association Award for Group or Duo of the Year. The band signed with Royalty Records in 2014 and released their second album, Ramble, on February 10, 2015. The album features three singles: "Turn This Car Around" released in October 2014, "Rebel Wings" released in February 2015, and "Can't Take My Lips Off You" released in August 2015.

== Discography ==
=== Studio albums ===
| Title | Details |
|---|---|
| The Boom Chucka Boys | Release date: April 30, 2013; Label: Cache/Sony Music Canada |
| Ramble | Release date: February 10, 2015; Label: Royalty Records/Sony Music Canada |

=== Singles ===
| Year | Single | Peak positions | Album |
| Year | Single | CAN Country | Album |
|---|---|---|---|
| 2013 | "Find My Peace of Mind" | 43 | The Boom Chucka Boys |
| 2013 | "Caffeine" | — | The Boom Chucka Boys |
| 2014 | "Turn This Car Around" | 42 | Ramble |
| 2015 | "Rebel Wings" | — | Ramble |
| 2015 | "Can't Take My Lips Off You" | — | Ramble |
"—" denotes releases that did not chart

=== Music videos ===
| Year | Video | Director |
|---|---|---|
| 2015 | "Can't Take My Lips Off You" | Matthew Kooman/Daniel Kooman |

== Awards and nominations ==
| Year | Association | Category | Result |
|---|---|---|---|
| 2014 | Canadian Country Music Association | Group or Duo of the Year | Nominated |
| 2015 | Canadian Country Music Association | Group or Duo of the Year | Nominated |
