= Time Flies (Melanie Laine album) =

Studio album by Melanie Laine
- Released: July 26, 2005
- Recorded: Sound Edge Studios
- Genre: Country
- Length: 41:34
- Label: Royalty Records
- Producer: Bart McKay

Time Flies is the only studio album by Canadian country music artist Melanie Laine. The album was released by Royalty Records on July 26, 2005. The album's only chart single was a cover of Juice Newton's "Queen of Hearts".

== Track listing ==
1. "Time Flies" (Dean Kush) - 4:06
2. "If Love Is a Weakness" (Bobby Economou, Dean McTaggart, Cyril Rawson) - 3:25
3. "Where Was I" (Victoria Banks, Steve Fox) - 3:42
4. "You Won't Catch Me Falling" (Mark Cawley, McTaggart) - 3:23
5. "One Night at Home" (Jimmy Dean, Melanie Laine) - 3:14
6. "I Am Yours" (Kush) - 3:57
7. "Good Enough" (Dean, Kush, Laine) - 3:03
8. "Is Goodbye the Best You Can Do" (Robin Branda, Fox) - 2:55
9. "I Can't Hold the Wind" (Denny Carr, Emily Kitos, Chris Lindsey) - 3:48
10. "Queen Of Hearts" (Hank DeVito) - 3:31
11. "Jump Right In" (Kush, Laine) - 3:13
12. "Til Love Makes Up Its Mind" (Dean, Kush) - 3:13

== Personnel ==
- lShaun Beavis bass, background vocals
- Jeff Bradshaw - steel guitar
- Jimmy Dean - vocals
- Melanie Laine - vocals
- Mike Thompson - drums
