= Famous First Words =

Famous First Words may refer to:

- Famous First Words (Gil Grand album), a 1998 country album
  - "Famous First Words" (song), title song of the Grand album
- Famous First Words (Viva Brother album), a 2011 rock album
