= Day Job =

Studio album by Gord Bamford
- Released: April 6, 2010
- Genre: Country
- Length: 39:15
- Label: Royalty
- Producers: Gord Bamford; Byron Hill

Gord Bamford chronology
Honkytonks and Heartaches (2007)	Day Job (2010)	Is It Friday Yet? (2012)

Singles from Day Job
- 1. "Day Job" Released: February 8, 2010; 2. "Put Some Alcohol On It" Released: July 12, 2010; 3. "My Daughter's Father" Released: November 8, 2010; 4. "Hank Williams Lonesome" Released: June 13, 2011

Day Job is the fourth studio album by Canadian country music artist Gord Bamford. It was released on April 6, 2010, by Royalty Records. Its first single was the title track.

== Track listing ==
No.	Title	Writer(s)	Length
1.	"Day Job"	Gord Bamford, Byron Hill	2:31
2.	"Cheap Date"	Gord Bamford, Byron Hill, Zack Turner	2:34
3.	"Put Some Alcohol On It"	Gord Bamford, Byron Hill, Roger Brown	2:41
4.	"Kids"	Phil O'Donnell, Buddy Owens, Adam Wheeler	3:30
5.	"Rowdy Boys"	Gord Bamford, Byron Hill, Roger Brown	3:35
6.	"She Can Bring It"	Gord Bamford, Byron Hill, Roger Brown	2:53
7.	"Better"	Gord Bamford, Byron Hill, Jenn Schott	3:29
8.	"Amber Glow"	Gord Bamford, Byron Hill, JB Rudd	2:55
9.	"My Daughter's Father"	Byron Hill, Arlos Smith	3:10
10.	"Hank Williams Lonesome"	Gord Bamford, Byron Hill, Zack Turner	2:40
11.	"Day to Day Routine"	Gord Bamford, Byron Hill, Roger Brown	3:06
12.	"Raise the Bar"	Gord Bamford, Byron Hill, Cyril Rawson	2:52
13.	"In This Town"	Gord Bamford, Byron Hill, Cal Sweat	3:19

== Chart performance ==
=== Singles ===
Year	Single	Peak positions
Year	Single	CAN
2010	"Day Job"	—
2010	"Put Some Alcohol On It"	87
2010	"My Daughter's Father"	94
2011	"Hank Williams Lonesome"	—
"—" denotes releases that did not chart
