= Jessica Robinson =

Jessica Robinson may refer to:

- Jessica Robinson (country singer), Canadian country music singer
- Jessica Robinson (performer), English actress and contestant on reality TV show Over the Rainbow
- Jessica Robinson, contestant on Rock Star: INXS
- Jessica Robinson, first million dollar winner of the U.S. version of Deal or No Deal
- Jessica Robinson, winner of the 2023 Yu-Gi-Oh European World Championship Qualifier
