= Is It Friday Yet? =

Studio album by Gord Bamford
- Released: March 6, 2012
- Genre: Country
- Length: 40:47
- Label: Sony Music Canada
- Producer: Gord Bamford; Byron Hill

Gord Bamford chronology
Day Job (2010)	Is It Friday Yet? (2012)	Country Junkie (2013)

Singles from Is It Friday Yet?
- 1. "Is It Friday Yet?" Released: January 2, 2012; 2. "Leaning on a Lonesome Song" Released: April 30, 2012; 3. "Disappearing Tail Lights" Released: October 2012; 4. "Farm Girl Strong" Released: February 2013; 5. "Must Be a Woman" Released: May 2013

Professional ratings
Review scores
Source	Rating
Leader-Post	4/5 stars
Winnipeg Free Press	3.5/5 stars

Is It Friday Yet? is the fifth studio album by Canadian country music artist Gord Bamford. It was released on March 6, 2012 by Sony Music Canada. Bamford co-wrote and co-produced all thirteen tracks.

== Track listing ==
No.	Title	Writer(s)	Length
1.	"Must Be a Woman"	Gord Bamford, Byron Hill, JB Rudd	3:24
2.	"Disappearing Tail Lights"	Gord Bamford, Byron Hill, Roger Brown	3:26
3.	"Farm Girl Strong"	Gord Bamford, Byron Hill, Terry McBride	2:47
4.	"Leaning on a Lonesome Song"	Gord Bamford, Buddy Owens, Ray Stephenson	3:13
5.	"You Make It Better"	Gord Bamford, Byron Hill, Wil Nance	3:30
6.	"Is It Friday Yet?"	Gord Bamford, Byron Hill, Roger Brown	3:02
7.	"I Call It Country"	Gord Bamford, Byron Hill, Tim Nichols	3:07
8.	"Nothing Hurts as Bad as a Broken Heart"	Gord Bamford, Byron Hill, JB Rudd	3:18
9.	"She Makes Me Look Good"	Gord Bamford, Byron Hill, Terry McBride	2:53
10.	"On My Best Days"	Gord Bamford, Byron Hill, Brent Baxter	3:04
11.	"Now That You're Gone"	Gord Bamford, Byron Hill, Casey Clarke, Richard Deacon	2:41
12.	"Sing Another Song About Love"	Gord Bamford, Byron Hill, Wil Nance	3:00
13.	"A Cowboy's Last Ride"	Gord Bamford, Byron Hill, Jerry W. Haggard	3:12

== Chart performance ==
=== Singles ===
Year	Single	Peak chart positions	
Year	Single	CAN Country	CAN
2012	"Is It Friday Yet?"	—	86
2012	"Leaning on a Lonesome Song"	—	79
2012	"Disappearing Tail Lights"	—	—
2013	"Farm Girl Strong"	11	91
2013	"Must Be a Woman"	19	—
"—" denotes releases that did not chart
