= The Orchard (duo) =

US musical group

- Origin: Edmonton, Alberta, Canada
- Genres: Country
- Years active: 2012–present
- Label: Royalty
- Members: Kasha Anne; Mitch Smith
- Website: www.theorchardmusic.com

The Orchard is a Canadian country music duo made up of singer-songwriters Kasha Anne and Mitch Smith. They are signed to Royalty Records and have distribution through Sony Music Entertainment. Their debut album, Southern Ground, was released in 2012 with all five singles charting in the top 100 of the Trax Country Radio Charts. The Orchard's second album, Georgia, was released in 2014 and features the singles "She Don't Play Fair" and "Angel Eyes". At the 2014 Association of Country Music in Alberta (ACMA) Awards, The Orchard received five nominations for "Group or Duo of the Year", "Fans Choice", "Album of the Year", "Rising Star" and two songs nominated for "Song of the Year". Their third album The Great Unknown was released on March 10, 2017.

== Discography ==
=== Studio albums ===
Title	Details
Southern Ground	Release date: August 28, 2012; Label: Royalty Records
Georgia	Release date: August 25, 2014; Label: Royalty Records
The Great Unknown	Release date: March 10, 2017; Label: Royalty Records

=== Singles ===
Year	Single	Album
2012	"Small Town Girl"	Southern Ground
2012	"Gotta Let You Go"	Southern Ground
2012	"Stick to Your Guns"	Southern Ground
2012	"Southern Ground"	Southern Ground
2013	"Run Baby Run"	Southern Ground
2013	"Float On"	Southern Ground
2014	"She Don't Play Fair"	Georgia
2014	"Angel Eyes"	Georgia
2015	"Wanted"	Georgia
