= Don't Let Her Be Gone =

Single by Gord Bamford

from the album Tin Roof
- Released: September 14, 2015
- Genre: Country
- Length: 3:29
- Label: Cache/Sony Music Canada
- Songwriter(s): Buddy Owens; Ray Stephenson; John Osborne
- Producer(s): Phil O'Donnell

Gord Bamford singles chronology
| "Groovin' with You" (2014) | "Don't Let Her Be Gone" (2015) | "Heard You in a Song" (2016) |

"Don't Let Her Be Gone" is a song recorded by Canadian country music artist Gord Bamford. It was released in September 2015 as the first single from his seventh studio album, Tin Roof. It peaked at number 3 on the Billboard Canada Country chart.

== Music video ==
The music video was directed by Stephano Barberis and premiered in September 2015.

== Chart performance ==
| Chart (2015) | Peak position |
|---|---|
| Canada (Canadian Hot 100) | 88 |
| Canada Country (Billboard) | 3 |
