= Famous First Words (Gil Grand album) =

Studio album by Gil Grand
- Released: June 2, 1998 (Canada); September 22, 1998 (U.S.)
- Genre: Country
- Length: 34:21
- Label: Monument
- Producer: Byron Hill

Gil Grand chronology
Famous First Words (1998)	Burnin' (2002)

Famous First Words is the debut studio album by Canadian country music artist Gil Grand. It was released in June 1998 in Canada by Monument Records.

== Content ==
Famous First Words charted four singles on the RPM charts in Canada. First was the title track at number six in 1998, followed by "Let's Start Livin'", "I Can't Put Your Memory to Bed", and "I Already Fell". All except "I Can't Put Your Memory to Bed" also charted on the Billboard Hot Country Songs charts in the United States as well.

== Critical reception ==
Tom Harrison of the Vancouver Province gave the album a mixed review, considering Grand's music "predictable and safe as milk".

== Track listing ==
1. "Famous First Words" (Byron Hill, J.B. Rudd) - 2:44
2. "Spilled Perfume" (Hill, Tony Hiller) - 3:51
3. "Cloud 8" (Hill, Tony Martin) - 3:43
4. "Love Me or Not (Here I Come)" (Gil Grand, Martin) - 3:33
5. "Bone Dry Heart" (Kostas, Harlan Howard) - 2:25
6. "Let's Start Livin'" (Grand, Steve Rice) - 2:50
7. "Look at Me, Look at You" (Grand, Hill, Hiller) - 3:37
8. "I Can't Put Your Memory to Bed" (Grand, Hill) - 3:00
9. "Certain Kind of Fool" (Hill, Martin) - 2:30
10. "I Already Fell" (Grand, Hill) - 2:44
11. "Thanks for the G Chord" (Hill, Mark Narmore) - 3:17

== Chart performance ==
Chart (1998)	Peak position
Canadian RPM Country Albums	22
