= Gary Fjellgaard =

Canadian country music singer-songwriter

- Born: August 14, 1937 (age 87); Rose Valley, Saskatchewan, Canada
- Genres: Country, folk
- Occupation: Singer-songwriter
- Instrument(s): Vocals, guitar
- Years active: Since 1976
- Labels: Royalty Records; Savannah Records; Stony Plain Records; Silver Creek Music
- Website: fjellgaard.bc.ca

Gary Lynn Fjellgaard (born August 14, 1937) is a Canadian country music singer-songwriter.

He has released fifteen albums and charted thirty-five songs on the RPM Country Tracks chart between 1977 and 1996, including the Top 10 singles "Walk in the Rain Tonight" (#10, 1987), "The Moon Is Out to Get Me" (with Linda Kidder, No. 10, 1989), "Cowboy in Your Heart" (#7, 1989), "Somewhere on the Island" (#7, 1990), "In My Heart" (with Kidder, No. 10, 1990) and "Train of Dreams" (#10, 1994).

== Career ==
He launched his own record label, Silver Creek Music, in 2001.

Fjellgaard's song "Riding on the Wind" was named Single of the Year in 1985 by the Canadian Country Music Association. He also won the 1987 Society of Composers, Authors and Music Publishers of Canada Song of the Year award for writing the Mercey Brothers' hit "Heroes".

Fjellgaard won the 1989 Canadian Country Music Association Award for Male Artist of the Year. He also won three awards for his collaborations with Linda Kidder in 1989, 1990 and 1992.

After several years of nominations, Fjellgaard won the 1993 Juno Award for Best Country Male Vocalist.

He was inducted into the Canadian Country Music Hall of Fame in 2005.

=== Canadian Country Music Association ===
- 1985 – Single of the Year ("Riding on the Wind")
- 1987 – SOCAN Song of the Year ("Heroes")
- 1989 – Male Artist of the Year
- 1989 – Duo of the Year (with Linda Kidder)
- 1990 – Duo of the Year (with Linda Kidder)
- 1992 – Vocal Collaboration of the Year (with Linda Kidder)

=== Juno Awards ===
- 1993 – Best Country Male Vocalist

== Discography ==
=== Albums ===
Year	Album	Label
1976	Me and Martin	Royalty
1979	Ballads and Beer	Royalty
1983	Time and Innocence	Savannah
1986	No Time to Lose	Savannah
1989	Heart of a Dream	Savannah
1991	Winds of October	Savannah
1994	Believe in Forever	Savannah
1996	Under Western Skies	Stony Plain
1997	The Best of Gary Fjellgaard	Stony Plain
2001	Grande Olde Ride	Silver Creek
2005	Caragana Wind	Silver Creek
2007	Secret Santa	Silver Creek
2009	All in the Journey	Silver Creek

=== Albums with Valdy ===
Year	Album	Label
2000	Contenders	Stony Plain
2007	Contenders Two: Still in the Running	Stony Plain

=== Singles ===
Year	Title	Peak positions	Album
Year	Title	CAN Country	Album
1977	"Ride Away to the Country"	31	Me and Martin
1977	"Old Fashioned Cowboy Song"	24	Me and Martin
1978	"How Much of Me"	37	Me and Martin
1978	"Caribou to Nashville"	19	Ballads and Beer
1979	"She Makes It Easy"	57	Me and Martin
1979	"Ballads and Beer"	51	Ballads and Beer
1982	"Ten Years Old and Barefoot"	17	Time and Innocence
1983	"Finest Dancer"	25	Time and Innocence
1984	"Alone Again on Sunday"	35	Time and Innocence
1984	"Runnin' Back to Your Heart"	35	Time and Innocence
1985	"Riding on the Wind"	26	No Time to Lose
1986	"Dancing in the Ring"	33	No Time to Lose
1986	"No Time to Lose"	25	No Time to Lose
1987	"As Rivers Run Saskatchewan"	41	No Time to Lose
1987	"Walk in the Rain Tonight"	10	No Time to Lose
1988	"Once Upon a Time"	23	No Time to Lose
1988	"Tears on Mainstreet"	24	No Time to Lose
1989	"The Moon Is Out to Get Me" (with Linda Kidder)	10	Heart of a Dream
1989	"Cowboy in Your Heart"	7	Heart of a Dream
1989	"The Colour of Your Collar"	12	Heart of a Dream
1990	"Somewhere on the Island"	7	Heart of a Dream
1990	"In My Heart" (with Linda Kidder)	10	Heart of a Dream
1990	"Dance with This Old Cowboy"	13	Heart of a Dream
1991	"Cry in the Wilderness"	15	Heart of a Dream
1991	"Drifting Cowboy"	20	Winds of October
1992	"Fire and Lace" (with Linda Kidder)	21	Winds of October
1992	"Last Hurrah"	26	Winds of October
1992	"Winds of October"	33	Winds of October
1993	"Never Say Goodbye"	32	Winds of October
1993	"Train of Dreams"	10	Believe in Forever
1994	"Islanders"	25	Believe in Forever
1994	"Trace Back to You" (with Anita Perras)	50	Believe in Forever
1994	"What About Love"	33	Believe in Forever
1995	"Dancing Up a Storm"	26	Believe in Forever
1996	"Rhythm of Your Wings"	16	Under Western Skies

== See also ==
- List of Canadian musicians
- List of country-music performers
- List of guitarists
- List of singer-songwriters
- Music of Saskatchewan
