= Dive Bar (Gord Bamford song) =

2018 song by Gord Bamford

Single by Gord Bamford

from the album Neon Smoke
- Released: June 2018
- Genre: Country
- Length: 3:06
- Label: Cache; Sony Canada; Anthem
- Songwriter(s): Tebey Ottoh; Kylie Sackley; Matthew Rogers
- Producer(s): Phil O'Donnell

Gord Bamford singles chronology
"Neon Smoke" (2018)	"Dive Bar" (2018)	"#Rednek" (2019)

Music video
- "Dive Bar" on YouTube

"Dive Bar" is a song recorded by Canadian country artist Gord Bamford. The song was co-written by Tebey, Kylie Sackley, and Matthew Rogers. It was the third single from Bamford's studio album Neon Smoke, and his second #1 hit on the Billboard Canada Country chart.

== Music video ==
The official music video for "Dive Bar" was directed by Stephano Barberis and premiered on July 13, 2018. The video was part of a social media engagement campaign, and finds Bamford in a crowded dive bar.

== Charts ==
"Dive Bar" reached a peak of #1 on the Billboard Canada Country chart for the week of September 22, 2018, marking his second Number One hit after "When Your Lips Are So Close".

Chart (2018)	Peak position
Australia Country (TMN)	43
Canada Country (Billboard)	1

== Certifications ==
Region	Certification	Certified units/sales
Canada (Music Canada)	Gold	40,000^{‡}
^{‡} Sales+streaming figures based on certification alone.
