= Colin Amey =

Canadian country music artist

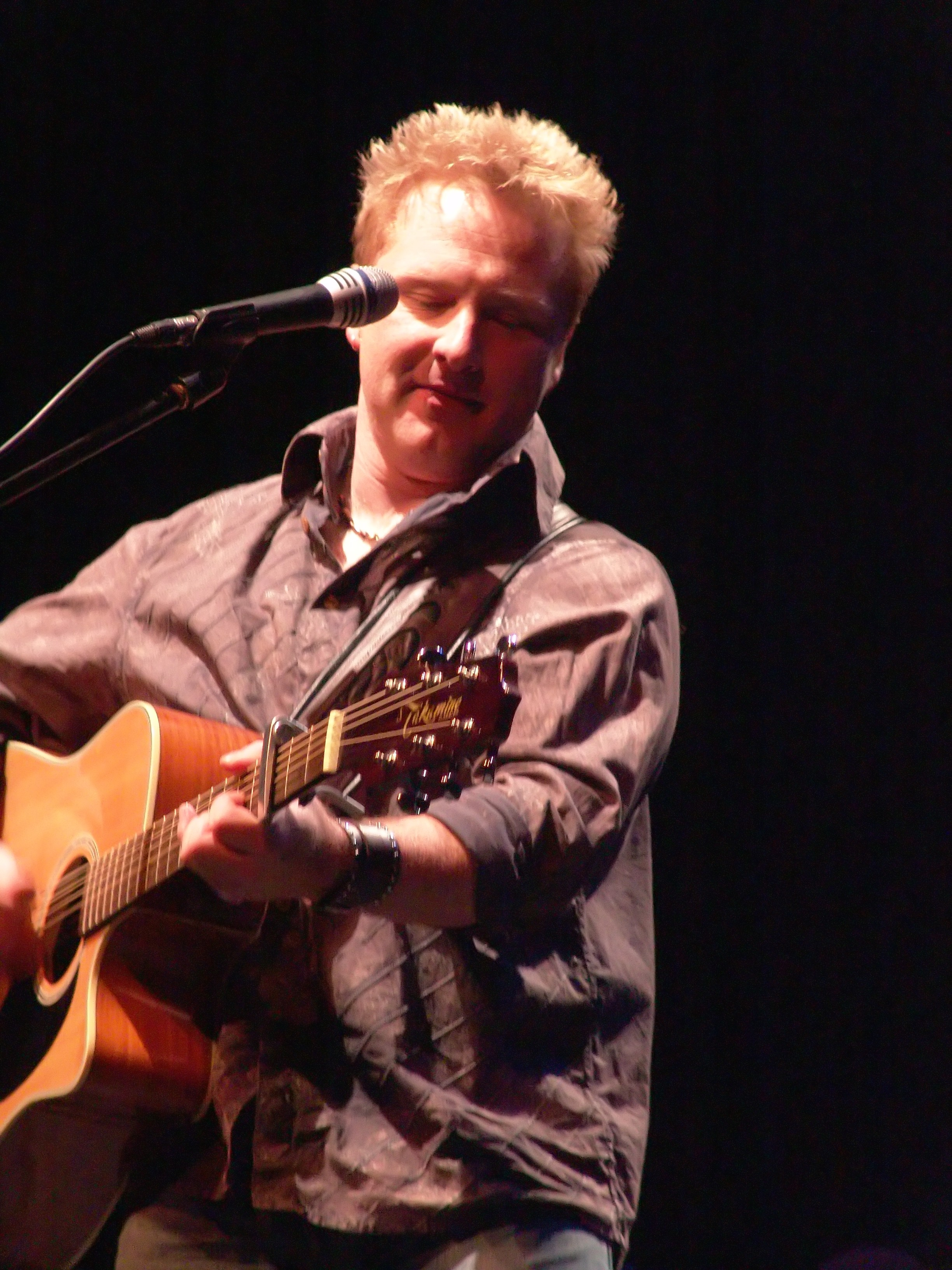
- Colin Amey, November 2005

Background information
- Born: Dunnville, Ontario, Canada
- Origin: Dunnville, Ontario, Canada
- Genres: Country
- Occupation: Singer
- Instrument: Vocals
- Years active: 1990–present
- Labels: Makin' Tracks; Royalty

Colin Amey (born Dunnville, Ontario) is a Canadian country music artist. Amey has released three studio albums which include 1998's Colin Amey, 2000's What My Heart Don't Know and 2006's Getaway. Two of Amey's singles reached the Top 20 on the RPM Country Tracks chart in Canada, "I Wish She Was Mine" and "What My Heart Don't Know."

== Discography ==
=== Albums ===
Year	Album
1998	Colin Amey
2000	What My Heart Don't Know
2006	Getaway
2013	Just Do What You Do (EP)

=== Singles ===
Year	Single	Chart Positions		Album
Year	Single	CAN Country	CAN AC	Album
1990	"Gonna Be Forever"	—	16	—N/a
1998	"I Wish She Was Mine"	19	—	Colin Amey
1999	"Could've Fooled Me"	37	—	Colin Amey
1999	"You're Crazy Too"	71	—	Colin Amey
2000	"What My Heart Don't Know"	19	—	What My Heart Don't Know
2000	"If I Didn't Call It Love"	*	—	What My Heart Don't Know
2001	"Any Man with Half a Heart"	*	—	What My Heart Don't Know
2001	"Might as Well Have Been a Train"	*	—	What My Heart Don't Know
2002	"She's That Girl"	*	—	What My Heart Don't Know
2002	"What Would I Do Without You" (with Nancy Denault)	*	—	What My Heart Don't Know
2003	"You Don't See That Every Day"	*	—	Getaway
2006	"Getaway"	*	—	Getaway
2006	"Look at That Truck"	*	—	Getaway
2006	"Millionaire"	*	—	Getaway
2007	"That Hurts"	*	—	Getaway
2013	"Go for a Soda"	—	—	Just Do What You Do
2014	"Life Happens"	—	—	Just Do What You Do
2015	"Sunday Drive"	—	—	TBD

=== Music videos ===
Year	Video
1999	"You're Crazy Too"
2000	"What My Heart Don't Know"
2000	"If I Didn't Call It Love"
2013	"Go for a Soda"
2015	"Sunday Drive"

== See also ==
- Music of Canada
- List of Canadian musicians
