= The Wolfe Brothers =

Australian country duo

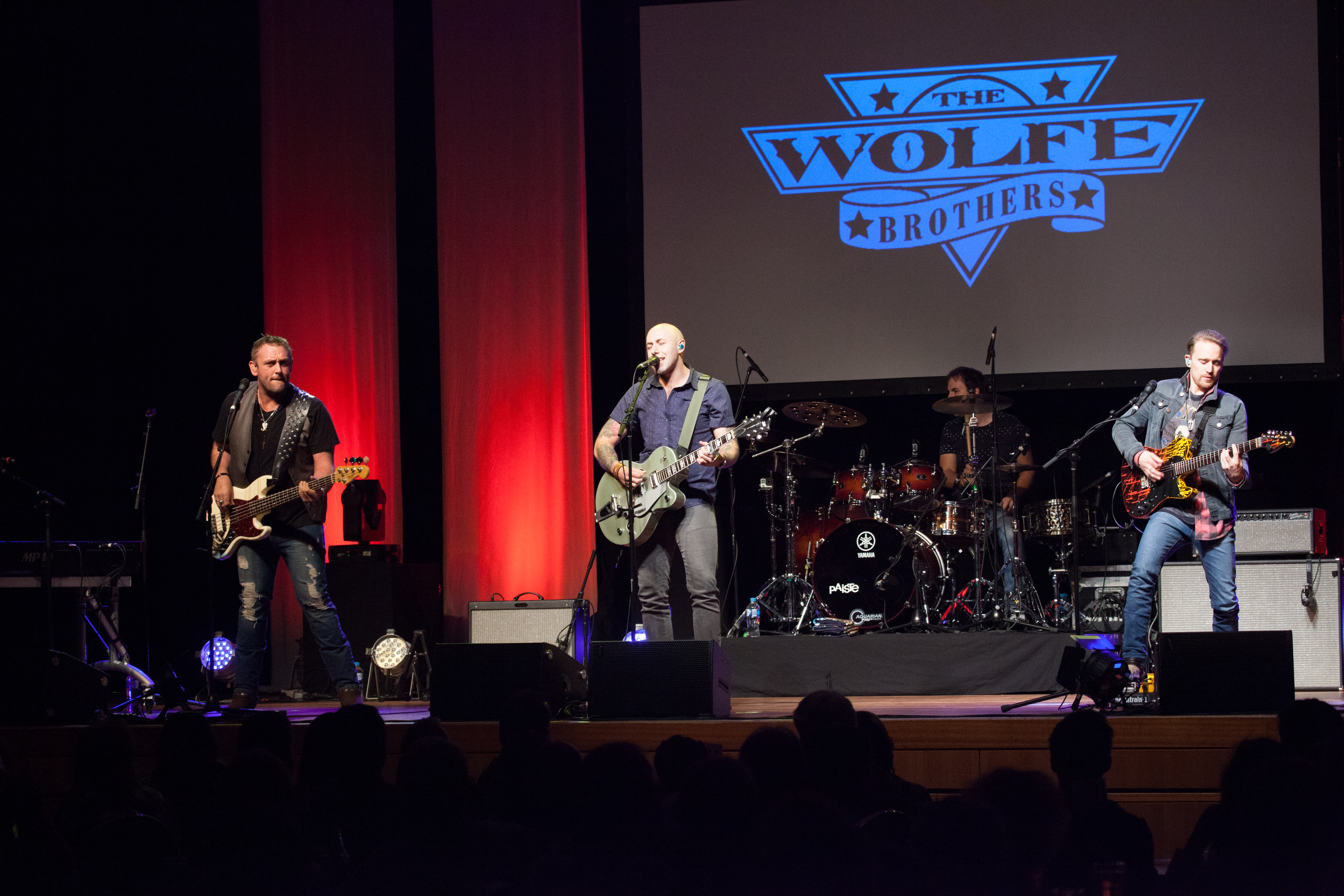
- The Wolfe Brothers performing in 2016

Background information
- Origin: Longley, Tasmania, Australia
- Genres: Country; country rock
- Years active: 2010–present
- Label: BMG
- Members: Tom Wolfe; Nick Wolfe
- Past members: Casey Kostuik; Brodie Rainbird
- Website: www.thewolfebrothers.com

The Wolfe Brothers are an Australian country music duo consisting of brothers Tom and Nick Wolfe. The group formerly included childhood friends Brodie Rainbird and Casey Kostiuk. The Wolfe Brothers rose to prominence after placing second in season six of Australia's Got Talent. As for 2026, The Wolfe Brothers have won 15 awards at the Country Music Awards of Australia.

== Career ==
=== Early years to 2012: Formation and Australia's Got Talent ===
Tom and Nick Wolfe grew up on a small berry farm outside Hobart, Tasmania. Their father Malcolm and uncle Tony played in a band with their parents, called The Wolfe Family Orchestra.

Nick Wolfe says, "We come from four generations of farmers and musicians." Their father guided Nick to the guitar and Tom to the piano, perhaps with "the intention of starting a band with us". Their mother filled the family home with music, exposing her children to 1990s country staples like Garth Brooks and Billy Ray Cyrus.

The Wolfe Brothers were formed by brothers Nick (guitar and vocals) and Tom Wolfe (bass and vocals), Brodie Rainbird (guitar) and Casey Kostiuk (drums). During their high school years all four played in different bands, covering songs by their glam rock and heavy metal music heroes. After leaving school they formed The Wolfe Brothers, and for six years played covers in pubs and clubs across Tasmania.

In May 2010, The Wolfe Brothers self-released a self-titled debut EP.

In 2012, The Wolfe Brothers auditioned for the sixth season of Australia's Got Talent, where they placed second behind Andrew De Silva.

=== 2013–2019: It's On to Country Heart ===
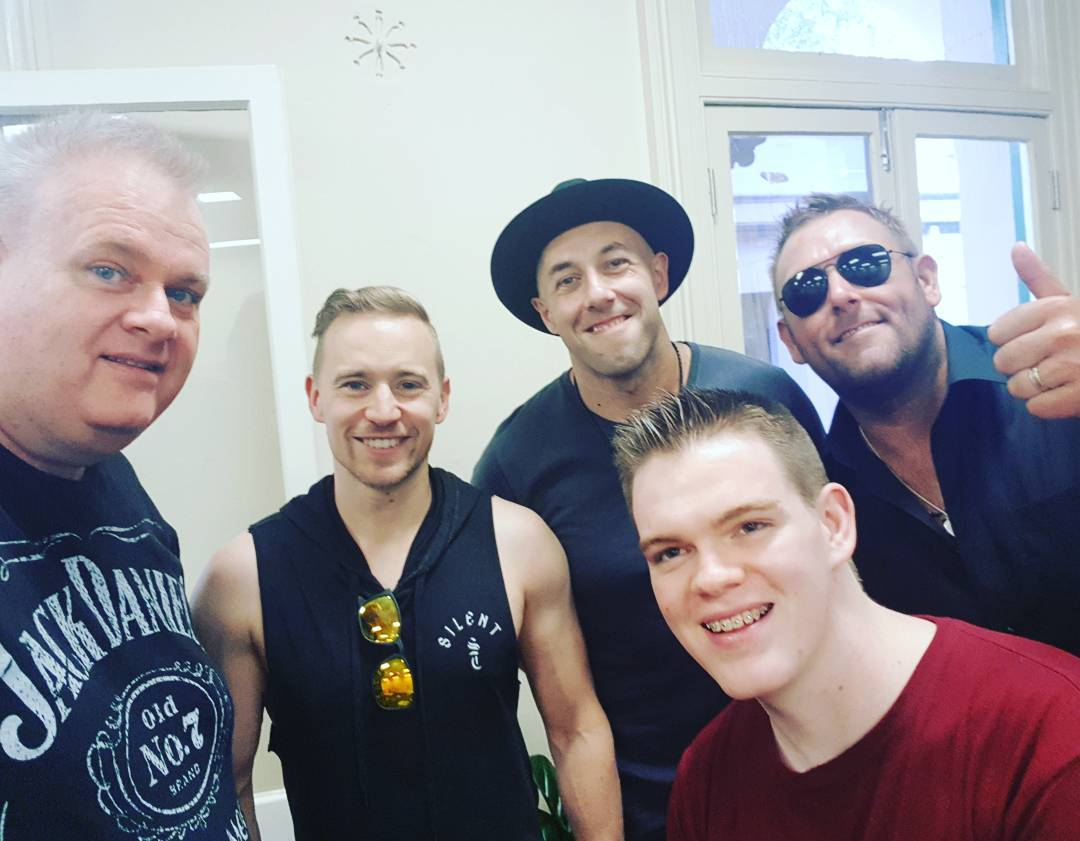
The Wolfe Brothers posing for a photo with radio hosts Big Stu and MJ during the 2018 Tamworth Country Music Festival.

In January 2013, The Wolfe Brothers released their debut studio album It's On, which peaked at number 18 on the ARIA Charts. The album spawned three county top 10 singles, including their first #1 song and #1 video "The Girl, The Bottle, The Memory".

The Wolfe Brothers were special guests on Lee Kernaghan's 2013–2014 Beautiful Noise Tour.

At the 2014 Country Music Awards of Australia, The Wolfe Brothers were nominated for four awards and won the New Australian Artist of the Year at the CMC Music Awards.

In September 2014, The Wolfe Brothers released their second studio album, Nothin' But Trouble, which peaked at number 13 on the ARIA Charts. The album spawned the single "That Kinda Night", which reached number 1 on the country singles chart. The album's second and third singles, "You Got to Me" and "Born and Bred" became the group's third and fourth number 1 on the country charts and the CMC video chart.

In September 2015, a live album titled Live at CMC Rocks QLD 2015 was released.

The group supported Kernaghan on his 2015 The Songs and the Stories Tour. Tom Wolfe later saying, "Touring with Lee has been a dream come true for us. He has taught us so much and it is still a little surreal to look across the stage and realise we are actually performing with one of our childhood heroes – the great Lee Kernaghan".

In June 2016, the group released their third studio album, This Crazy Life album, which peaked at number 10 on the ARIA charts. The album was recorded in Nashville, USA over three months between November 2015 and February 2016 under the guidance of producer Luke Wooten.

In 2016, The Wolfe Brothers were nominated in three categories in the CMC Music Awards, winning the CMC Group of the Year Award; their second CMC Award.

Late in 2016, Nick and Tom's father, Malcolm died of cancer.

In 2017 they recorded the single "Damn Good Mates" with Lee Kernaghan for Kernaghan's 25th Anniversary Album. In 2017 The Wolfe Brothers won Australian Group/Duo of the Year at the Planet Country's Music for a New Generation Awards.

In April 2018, the group released their fourth studio album Country Heart, which peaked at number 9 on the ARIA Charts. The singles "Ain't Seen It Yet" and "Country Heart" both reaching number 1 on the country singles chart.

At the 2019 Country Music Awards of Australia, the group won including Album of the Year, Contemporary Country Album of the Year, Group or Duo of the Year and Song of the Year with "Ain't Seen It Yet".

=== 2020–2024: Kids on Cassette to Livin' the Dream ===
In March 2020, Brodie Rainbird announced he is leaving the group as Casey Kostiuk had done some years earlier. However, both continue to play with the duo on tour.

In April 2020 the band worldwide deal with global independent label, BMG, in partnership with the BBR Music Group.

On 17 April 2020, the group released their first single on the label entitled "No Breaks".

The Wolfe Brothers' fifth studio album, Kids on Cassette was released in July 2021, the same day they celebrated their 15th consecutive #1 single on the Country Airplay Charts with "Startin' Something" The album debuted at number 6 on the ARIA Charts.

In November 2021, they joined Australian-born, Canadian country artist Gord Bamford for the Australian version of his single "Drink Along Song" in 2021.

The Wolfe Brothers were nominated for seven awards at the 2022 CMAAs, winning two.

In April 2022, the Wolfe Brothers commenced their Startin' Something tour across Australia.

The Wolfe Brothers' sixth studio album Livin' the Dream was released on 14 April 2023. The album was written during the pandemic over Zoom writing sessions with writers all over the world. Nick Wolfe produced the album with Rod McCormack and Matt Fell. Nick said "Sonically, Livin' the Dream is a conscious decision by us to get back to our country roots. We explored a lot of pop and rock territory on our last record but we want to come out of the gate swinging country style and give everyone a taste of what's to come for the rest of this record that we're really proud of."

The Wolfe Brothers were nominated for six awards at the 2024 CMAAs.

=== 2025: Australian Made ===
In July 2025, the group announced the release of Australian Made, scheduled for release on 29 August 2025. At the 2026 Country Music Awards, the album won five awards, including Album of the Year.

== Discography ==
=== Albums ===
==== Studio albums ====
Title	Details	Peak chart positions
Title	Details	AUS
It's On	Released: 18 January 2013; Label: ABC Music/Universal Music Australia (3724819)	18
Nothin' But Trouble	Released: 5 September 2014; Label: ABC Music/Universal Music Australia (3791761)	13
This Crazy Life	Released: 3 June 2016; Label: ABC Music/Universal Music Australia (4788318)	10
Country Heart	Released: 23 March 2018; Label: ABC Music/Universal Music Australia (6740743)	9
Kids on Cassette	Released: 30 July 2021; Label: BMG (538679292)	6
Livin' the Dream	Released: 14 April 2023; Label: BMG (538865602)	8
Australian Made	Released: 29 August 2025; Label: ABC Country (ABCC0033)	9

==== Live albums ====
Title	Details
Live at CMC Rocks QLD 2015	Released: 18 September 2015; Label: The Wolfe Brothers/ ABC

=== Extended plays ===
Title	Details
The Wolfe Brothers	Released: May 2010; Label: Wolfe Brothers

== Awards and nominations ==
=== AIR Awards ===
The Australian Independent Record Awards (commonly known informally as AIR Awards) is an annual awards night to recognise, promote and celebrate the success of Australia's Independent Music sector.

Year	Nominee / work	Award	Result	Ref.
2019	Country Heart	Best Independent Country Album	Nominated	
2022	Kids on Cassette	Best Independent Country Album or EP	Nominated	
2024	Livin' the Dream	Best Independent Country Album or EP	Nominated	

=== APRA Awards ===
The APRA Awards are presented annually from 1982 by the Australasian Performing Right Association (APRA), "honouring composers and songwriters". They commenced in 1982.

Year	Nominee / work	Award	Result	Ref.
2014	"The Girl, the Bottle, the Memory" (Nicholas Wolfe)	Country Work of the Year	Nominated	

=== ARIA Music Awards ===
The ARIA Music Awards is an annual awards ceremony that recognises excellence, innovation, and achievement across all genres of Australian music.The Wolfe Brothers have been nominated thrice.

Year	Nominee / work	Award	Result	Ref.
2016	This Crazy Life	Best Country Album	Nominated	
2018	Country Heart	Best Country Album	Nominated	
2021	Kids on Cassette	Best Country Album	Nominated	
2023	Livin' the Dream	Best Country Album	Nominated	

=== Country Music Awards of Australia ===
The Country Music Awards of Australia (CMAA) (also known as the Golden Guitar Awards) is an annual awards night held in January during the Tamworth Country Music Festival, in Tamworth, New South Wales, celebrating recording excellence in the Australian country music industry. The Wolfe Brothers have won fifteen awards.

Year	Nominee / work	Award	Result
2014	It's On	Top Selling Album of the Year	Nominated
2014	"The Girl, The Bottle, The Memory"	Group or Duo of the Year	Nominated
2014	"The Girl, The Bottle, The Memory"	Song of the Year	Nominated
2014	"The Girl, The Bottle, The Memory"	New Talent of the Year	Nominated
2015	Nothin' But Trouble	Group or Duo of the Year	Nominated
2015	"That Kinda Night"	Single of the Year	Nominated
2016	"The Girl, The Bottle, The Memory" (written by Nick Wolfe)	Song of the Year	Nominated
2016	The Wolfe Brothers	Group of the Year	Nominated
2016	(unknown)	(unknown)	Nominated
2016	(unknown)	(unknown)	Nominated
2017	This Crazy Life	Group or Duo of the Year	Nominated
2017	This Crazy Life	Album of the Year	Nominated
2019	Country Heart	Contemporary Country Album of the Year	Won
2019	Country Heart	Country Album of the Year	Won
2019	Country Heart	Group or Duo of the Year	Won
2019	"Ain't Seen It Yet"	Song of the Year	Won
2019	"Ain't Seen It Yet"	Single of the Year	Nominated
2019	"Ain't Seen It Yet" (Director: Joshua Favaloro)	Video of the Year	Nominated
2020	"Hey Brother"	Single of the Year	Nominated
2020	"Hey Brother" (Jay Seeney, Blacklist Productions)	Video of the Year	Nominated
2020	"Till It Ends" (with Lee Kernaghan)	Vocal Collaboration of the Year	Nominated
2021	"No Brakes"	Single of the Year	Nominated
2022	Kids on Cassette	Album of the Year	Nominated
2022	Kids on Cassette	Contemporary Country Album of the Year	Won
2022	"Kids on Cassette"	AMCOS Song of the Year	Nominated
2022	"Kids on Cassette"	Video of the Year	Nominated
2022	"Startin' Something" (with LOCASH)	Vocal Collaboration of the Year	Nominated
2022	"Small Town Song"	Heritage Song of the Year	Nominated
2022	The Wolfe Brothers	News Group or Duo of the Year	Won
2023	"Something Good's Gonna Happen" featuring Amy Sheppard (Directed by Jay Seeney)	Video of the Year	Nominated
2023	"All Or Nothing" (Written by Adam Brand, Nicholas Wolfe and Tom Wolfe) – Recorded by Adam Brand	Song of the Year	Nominated
2024	Livin' the Dream	Album of the Year	Won
2024	Livin' the Dream	Contemporary County Album of the Year	Nominated
2024	"Here's the Ones"	Song of the Year	Nominated
2024	"Running the Country" (with Travis Collins)	Single of the Year	Nominated
2024	"Running the Country" (with Travis Collins)	Vocal Collaboration of the Year	Won
2024	The Wolfe Brothers	Group or Duo of the Year	Won
2025	"Beer in a Bar" (with Kaylee Bell)	Vocal Collaboration of the Year	Won
2025	"Little By Little"	Song of the Year	Nominated
2025	"Little By Little"	Single of the Year	Nominated
2026	Australian Made	Album of the Year	Won
2026	Australian Made	Contemporary Country Album of the Year	Won
2026	The Wolfe Brothers	Group or Duo of the Year	Won
2026	"How Many One More Times?" (The Wolfe Brothers with Zac & George)	Vocal Collaboration of the Year	Won
2026	"Australia Made" (Nicholas Wolfe, Thomas Wolfe, Graeme Connors)	Heritage Song of the Year	Won
2026	"Australia Made" (Nicholas Wolfe, Thomas Wolfe, Graeme Connors)	Song of the Year	Nominated
2026	"Australia Made" (directed by Jeremy Minett)	Music Video of the Year	Nominated

=== Country Music Association Awards ===
The Country Music Association Awards (CMA) are and annual American awards show which honours country music artists and broadcasters and recognizes outstanding achievement in the country music industry. The Wolfe Brothers have one nomination.

Year	Nominee / work	Award	Result	Ref.
2022	The Wolfe Brothers	Global Country Artist Award	Nominated	

=== CMC Awards ===
The CMC Awards are awarded annually by Country Music Channel Australia.

Year	Nominee / work	Award	Result (wins only)	Ref.
2014	The Wolfe Brothers	New Australian Artist of the Year	Won	
2016	The Wolfe Brothers	CMC Group Of The Year	Won	

=== National Live Music Awards ===
The National Live Music Awards (NLMAs) are a broad recognition of Australia's diverse live industry, celebrating the success of the Australian live scene. The awards commenced in 2016.

Year	Nominee / work	Award	Result	Ref.
2019	The Wolfe Brothers	Live Country Act of the Year	Nominated	
