= Roger Brown & Swing City =

- Genre: Western swing
- Years active: 1996
- Label: Decca Records

Roger Brown & Swing City was an American country music group, consisting of Roger Brown and ten other musicians. The band released one western swing EP on Decca Records (Decca/MCA #55203) on July 16, 1996. It was described by AllMusic as "a terrific, fun slice of dance music".
