= Country Junkie =

Studio album by Gord Bamford
- Released: October 8, 2013
- Genre: Country
- Label: Cache/Sony Music Canada
- Producers: Gord Bamford; Byron Hill

Gord Bamford chronology
Is It Friday Yet? (2012)	Country Junkie (2013)	Christmas in Canada (2013)

Singles from Country Junkie
- 1. "When Your Lips Are So Close" Released: September 9, 2013; 2. "Unreal" Released: January 15, 2014; 3. "Where a Farm Used to Be" Released: May 2014; 4. "Groovin' with You" Released: October 2014

Professional ratings
Review scores
Source	Rating
Country Standard Time	
Top Country	4.5/5 stars

Country Junkie is the sixth studio album by Canadian country music artist Gord Bamford. It was released on October 8, 2013, by Cache/Sony Music Canada. Bamford premiered the first single, "When Your Lips Are So Close", at the Canadian Country Music Association Awards in September 2013.

Country Junkie was nominated for Country Album of the Year at the 2014 Juno Awards.

== Critical reception ==
Dustin Blumhagen of Country Standard Time gave the album a positive review, writing that "there are plenty of funny songs and party songs, but Bamford excels when he uses his voice to channel emotion into love ballads." Shenieka Russell-Metcalf of Top Country gave the album four and a half stars out of five, saying that it "gives us a good mix of catchy songs […] and songs that hit close to our hearts."

== Track listing ==
No.	Title	Writer(s)	Length
1.	"Where a Farm Used to Be"	Gord Bamford, Phil O'Donnell, Buddy Owens	2:56
2.	"When Your Lips Are So Close"	Gord Bamford, Brent Baxter, Byron Hill	3:00
3.	"The Truth"	Gord Bamford, Byron Hill, Cyril Rawson	3:45
4.	"Unreal"	Gord Bamford, O'Donnell, Owens	3:29
5.	"One Makes Me Want Another"	Gord Bamford, Brice Long, Byron Hill	2:51
6.	"Daughterville"	Gord Bamford, Byron Hill	2:42
7.	"She Gets Me"	Gord Bamford, Jake Mathews, Duane Steele	3:19
8.	"That's How We Party"	Gord Bamford, O'Donnell, Owens	3:16
9.	"Groovin' with You"	Jake Mathews, Duane Steele	3:05
10.	"Blue Jeans"	Gord Bamford, Marty Dodson, Byron Hill	2:49
11.	"I Won't Regret That"	Gord Bamford, Byron Hill, Dave Turnbull	3:18
12.	"Saturday's Beer"	Gord Bamford, Marty Dodson, Byron Hill	3:52
13.	"Country Junkie" (featuring Joe Diffie)	Gord Bamford, Byron Hill	3:02
14.	"Nights Like You"	Gord Bamford, Brent Baxter, Byron Hill	2:48

== Chart performance ==
=== Album ===
Chart (2013)	Peak position
Canadian Albums (Billboard)	11

=== Singles ===
Year	Single	Peak chart positions	
Year	Single	CAN Country	CAN
2013	"When Your Lips Are So Close"	1	42
2014	"Unreal"	10	77
2014	"Where a Farm Used to Be"	8	77
2014	"Groovin' with You"	17	—
"—" denotes releases that did not chart
