= Famous First Words (song) =

Single by Gil Grand

from the album Famous First Words
- B-side: "I Can't Put Your Memory to Bed"
- Released: May 1998
- Recorded: 1998
- Genre: Country
- Length: 2:46
- Label: Monument Records
- Songwriters: Byron Hill, JB Rudd
- Producer: Byron Hill

Gil Grand singles chronology
"Famous First Words" (1998)	"Spilled Perfume" (1998)

"Famous First Words" is a song written by Byron Hill and JB Rudd, and recorded by Canadian country music artist Gil Grand. It was released as the debut single and title track from Grand's 1998 debut album. It peaked at number 6 on the Canadian RPM Country Tracks chart and number 73 on the U.S. Billboard Hot Country Singles & Tracks chart.

== Music video ==
The music video was directed by Michael Merriman and premiered in mid-1998.

== Chart performance ==
The song debuted at number 78 on the Canadian RPM Country Tracks on the chart dated May 11, 1998 and spent 14 weeks on the chart before peaking at number 6 on August 10.

=== Weekly charts ===
Chart (1998)	Peak position
Canada Country Singles (RPM)	6
US Hot Country Songs (Billboard)	73

=== Year-end charts ===
Chart (1998)	Position
Canada Country Tracks (RPM)	48
