= When Your Lips Are So Close =

Single by Gord Bamford

from the album Country Junkie
- Released: September 9, 2013
- Genre: Country
- Length: 3:00
- Label: Cache; Sony Music Canada; TTA
- Songwriters: Gord Bamford; Byron Hill; Brent Baxter
- Producers: Gord Bamford; Byron Hill

Gord Bamford singles chronology
"Must Be a Woman" (2013)	"When Your Lips Are So Close" (2013)	"Unreal" (2014)

"When Your Lips Are So Close" is a song recorded by Canadian country music artist Gord Bamford. It was released in September 2013 as the first single from his sixth studio album, Country Junkie. Bamford premiered the single at the Canadian Country Music Association Awards. The song was released to radio in the United States by TTA Music. It peaked at number 1 on the Billboard Canada Country chart.

== Critical reception ==
Shenieka Russell-Metcalf of Top Country wrote that the song "shows his intimate side." Dustin Blumhagen of Country Standard Time called it "a radio friendly mid tempo love song, which can easily be mistaken for a Toby Keith hit."

== Music video ==
The music video was directed by Stephano Barberis and premiered in September 2013. It was filmed in Phoenix, Arizona.

== Chart performance ==
"When Your Lips Are So Close" debuted at number 87 on the Canadian Hot 100 for the week of September 28, 2013, and reached its peak at number 42. It was number one on the Billboard Canada Country chart for the week dated November 30, 2013.

Chart (2013)	Peak position
Canada Hot 100 (Billboard)	42
Canada Country (Billboard)	1

== Certifications ==
Region	Certification
Canada (Music Canada)	Gold
