= Lisa Hewitt =

Canadian country music singer

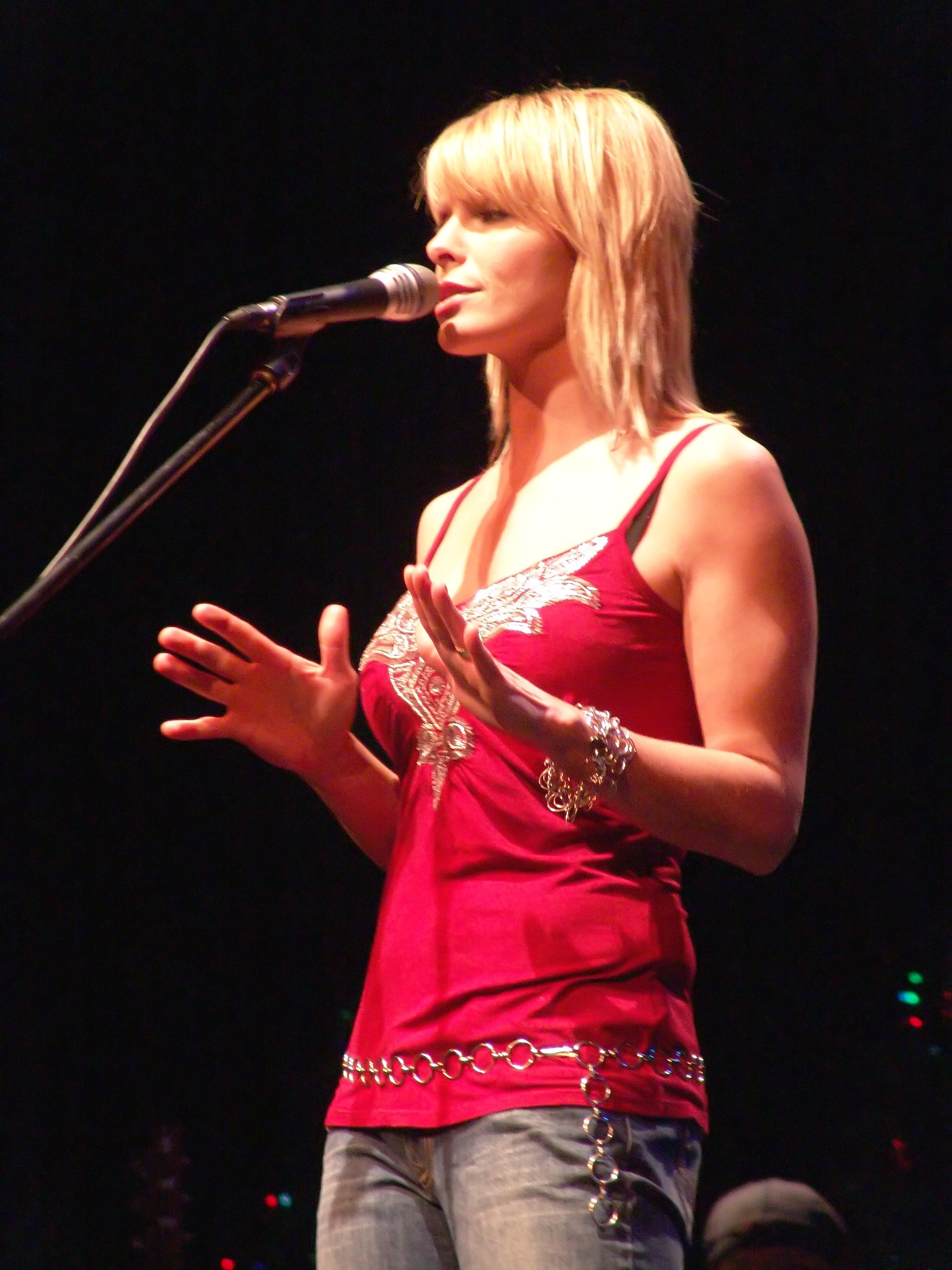
- Lisa Hewitt, November 2005

Background information
- Origin: Canada
- Genres: Country
- Occupation: Singer
- Years active: 1999–present
- Labels: Socan, Royalty, 306
- Website: Official website

Lisa Hewitt is a Canadian country music singer. Hewitt released her self-titled debut album on the independent Socan Records in 1999. Her second album, The Road I Chose, was released in 2004 by Royalty Records. Its first single, "One of These Goodbyes," reached the Top 25 on the Radio & Records Canadian country singles chart. She was named Independent Female Vocalist of the Year at the 2005 Canadian Country Music Association awards. Hewitt was featured in 2006 on the CMT series Plucked, a documentary about six country music stars in training. In 2009, Hewitt was signed to 306 Records. Her third album, Fearless, was released in March 2009.

== Discography ==
=== Studio albums ===
Title	Album details
Lisa Hewitt	Release date: September 1, 1999; Label: Socan Records; Formats: CD, cassette
The Road I Chose	Release date: October 19, 2004; Label: Royalty Records; Formats: CD, music download
Fearless	Release date: March 31, 2009; Label: 306 Records; Formats: CD, music download

=== Singles ===
Year	Single	Peak positions	Album
Year	Single	CAN Country	Album
2000	"Midnight in the Garden of Love"	—	Lisa Hewitt
2000	"I Just Want to Hold You"	—	Lisa Hewitt
2001	"Slide Over I'm Driving"	—	Lisa Hewitt
2004	"One of These Goodbyes"	21	The Road I Chose
2005	"Say It's Gone"	—	The Road I Chose
2005	"Take Me There"	—	The Road I Chose
2006	"Somebody"	—	The Road I Chose
2009	"Better in Texas"	—	Fearless
2009	"Too Used to Loving You"	—	Fearless
2014	"If I Could"	—	—N/a
"—" denotes releases that did not chart

=== Music videos ===
Year	Video	Director
2006	"Somebody"	Stephano Barberis

== Awards and nominations ==
Year	Association	Category	Result
2005	Canadian Country Music Association	Chevy Trucks Rising Star Award	Nominated
2005	Canadian Country Music Association	Independent Female Artist of the Year	Won
2006	Canadian Country Music Association	Independent Female Artist of the Year	Nominated
2007	Canadian Country Music Association	Independent Female Artist of the Year	Nominated
