= Melanie Laine =

- Born: Melanie Laine Wunsch; November 30, 1975 (age 50)
- Origin: Saskatoon, Saskatchewan, Canada
- Genres: Country
- Occupation: Singer
- Years active: 2002 – Present
- Label: Royalty Records
- Website: www.melanielaine.com

Melanie Laine is a country music singer from Saskatoon, Saskatchewan, Canada, best known for her cover of Juice Newton's "Queen Of Hearts." Her first album, Time Flies, was released in 2005.

== Discography ==
=== Albums ===
Title	Details
Time Flies	Release date: July 26, 2005; Label: Royalty Records

=== Singles ===
Year	Single	Peak positions	Album
Year	Single	CAN Country	Album
2002	"Time Flies"	—	Time Flies
2002	"Jump Right In"	—	Time Flies
2005	"If Love Is a Weakness"	—	Time Flies
2005	"Is Goodbye the Best You Can Do"	—	Time Flies
2006	"Queen of Hearts"	16	Time Flies
2006	"One Night at Home"	—	Time Flies
2007	"Til Love Makes Up Its Mind"	—	Time Flies
"—" denotes releases that did not chart

=== Music videos ===
Year	Video	Director
2005	"If Love Is a Weakness"	Antonio Hrynchuk
2006	"Queen of Hearts"	Antonio Hrynchuk
