= Anita Perras =

Canadian country music singer (born 1960)

- Born: 17 March 1960 (age 66); Sudbury, Ontario
- Genre: Country
- Occupation: Singer
- Instrument: Vocals
- Years active: 1976–present
- Labels: Snocan Records; Tailspin Records; Savannah Records; Pine Ridge; True North Records
- Website: Official website

Anita Perras (born 17 March 1960) is a Canadian country music singer.

Perras has released six solo albums, three duo albums with former husband Tim Taylor, and charted twenty-six songs on the RPM Country Tracks chart between 1981 and 1995. Her top 10 singles include "Heads You Win, Tails I Lose" (#10, 1986), "Isn't That the Strangest Thing" (with Tim Taylor, No. 10, 1988), "One Smokey Rose" (#9, 1988), "The Tip of My Fingers" (#9, 1989), "Touch My Heart" (#10, 1990) "Here Comes My Baby" (#9, 1990) and "It Might as Well Be Me" (#10, 1993).

As a solo artist, Perras won the award for Female Artist of the Year in 1986 and 1987, her single "One Smokey Rose" was named Single of the Year in 1988, and she was also nominated for Most Promising Female Vocalist in 1990 and Best Country Female Vocalist in 1994.

Perras and Taylor received the Canadian Country Music Association award for Duo of the Year in 1985, 1986, 1987 and 1988, and were nominated for the Juno Award for Country Group or Duo of the Year in 1985 and 1987.

Perras has continued to record, releasing the album Those Classic Country Songs in September 2008 on True North Records.

== Discography ==
=== Albums ===
Year	Album	CAN Country	Label
1989	Touch My Heart	—	Savannah
1993	Way Beyond the Blue	26	Savannah
1995	Live (By Request)	—	K-Tel
1997	The Greatest Hits Collection	—	3KO Entertainment
2004	Think Again	—	Pine Ridge
2008	Those Classic Country Songs	—	True North

=== Albums with Tim Taylor ===
Year	Album	Label
1981	Bought and Paid For	Snocan
1985	This Is Our Night	Tailspin
1987	Anita & Tim	Savannah

=== Singles ===
Year	Title	Peak positions	Album
Year	Title	CAN Country	Album
1981	"Over the Line Again"	41	—N/a
1983	"Somebody Said It Was Me"	40	—N/a
1983	"You Got What You Want"	35	—N/a
1984	"How's a Girl to Know"	39	This Is Our Night
1985	"Mutual Acquaintance"	29	This Is Our Night
1986	"Heads You Win (Tails I Lose)"	10	Anita & Tim
1987	"I've Found Someone Too"	20	Anita & Tim
1988	"One Smokey Rose"	9	Touch My Heart
1989	"Hello Again"	30	Touch My Heart
1989	"The Tip of My Fingers"	9	Touch My Heart
1989	"Touch My Heart"	10	Touch My Heart
1990	"Here Comes My Baby"	9	Touch My Heart
1990	"After All"	20	Touch My Heart
1991	"I've Got a Travelin' Heart"	41	Way Beyond the Blue
1992	"Can't You Just Stay Gone"	23	Way Beyond the Blue
1992	"Somewhere Under the Rainbow"	41	Way Beyond the Blue
1993	"It Might as Well Be Me"	10	Way Beyond the Blue
1993	"If I Didn't Have You in My World"	25	Way Beyond the Blue
1993	"Way Beyond the Blue"	17	Way Beyond the Blue
1995	"If I Were You"	22	Live (By Request)

==== Singles with Tim Taylor ====
Year	Title	Peak positions	Album
Year	Title	CAN Country	Album
1984	"We Get By"	34	This Is Our Night
1985	"This Is Our Night"	29	This Is Our Night
1986	"Something Good"	19	Anita & Tim
1986	"Heading in the Wrong Direction"	23	Anita & Tim
1987	"Isn't That the Strangest Thing"	10	Anita & Tim
1988	"You're Too Much"	*	Anita & Tim
* denotes unknown peak positions

==== Guest singles ====
Year	Title	Artist	Peak positions	Album
Year	Title	Artist	CAN Country	Album
1994	"Trace Back"	Gary Fjellgaard	50	Believe in Forever

== Awards ==
=== Canadian Country Music Association ===
- 1985 – Duo of the Year (with Tim Taylor)
- 1986 – Female Artist of the Year
- 1986 – Duo of the Year (with Tim Taylor)
- 1987 – Female Artist of the Year
- 1987 – Duo of the Year (with Tim Taylor)
- 1988 – Single of the Year ("One Smokey Rose")
- 1988 – Duo of the Year (with Tim Taylor)
