= Heaven on Dirt =

2021 song by Gord Bamford

Single by Gord Bamford

from the album Diamonds in a Whiskey Glass
- Released: April 16, 2021
- Genre: Country
- Length: 3:20
- Label: Anthem; Cache; UMA
- Songwriter(s): Jason Lee Owens Jr.; Philip O'Donnell; Casey Beathard; Jenee Fleenor

Gord Bamford singles chronology
"Diamonds in a Whiskey Glass" (2020)	"Heaven on Dirt" (2021)	"Drink Along Song" (2021)

Music video
- "Heaven on Dirt" on YouTube

"Heaven on Dirt" is a song recorded by Canadian country artist Gord Bamford. The track was written by Jason Lee Owens Jr., Philip O'Donnell, Casey Beathard, and Jenee Fleenor. It is the third single off Bamford's ninth studio album Diamonds in a Whiskey Glass.

== Background ==
Bamford remarked that "this type of song only comes along once in a lifetime". He called the track's writers some of his "favourite hit songwriters", saying he was "very fortunate to have the opportunity to record it".

== Critical reception ==
Nanci Dagg called the track an "upbeat ballad", with the "Gord Bamford sound that we so easily recognize and love". The Music Express referred to the song as a "power ballad", saying it "embraces Country storytelling and reflects on the feeling of finding your true joy in life".

== Accolades ==
Year	Association	Category	Result	Ref
2022	CCMA	Video of the Year	Nominated	

== Charts ==
Chart (2021)	Peak position
Australia Country Hot 50 (TMN)	42
Canada Country (Billboard)	21
