= A Nashville Wish =

- Theatrical release poster
- Directed by: Demetrius Navarro
- Written by: Ty Demartino
- Produced by: Robin Capehart; Mark Popadic
- Starring: Maxfield Camp; Kaileigh Bullard; Lee Greenwood; Waylon Payne; Kourtney Hansen
- Music by: Kevin Dorsey
- Production companies: Brentwood Avenue Entertainment; D Street Films
- Distributed by: Vision Films
- Release date: February 2, 2024
- Running time: 100 minutes
- Country: United States
- Language: English

A Nashville Wish is a 2024 American musical drama film written by Ty Demartino and directed by Demetrius Navarro. It stars Maxfield Camp, Kaileigh Bullard, Lee Greenwood, and Waylon Payne.

A Nashville WIsh was released in select theaters on February 2, 2024, followed by a video-on-demand release on February 27.

== Plot ==
A country music singer dreams of dating a popular cheerleader and going to Nashville, Tenn., to become a star. As fate would have it, his career takes off at the same time as their relationship, but she doesn't share his love of music.

== Cast ==
- Maxfield Camp as Tucker Davis
- Kaileigh Bullard as Lisa Masters
- Lee Greenwood as Grandpa Woods
- Waylon Payne as Martin Randall
- Kate Orsini as Daisy Masters
- Kevin Sizemore as Lee Davis
- Kourtney Hansen as Carol Davis
- Fletcher Olson as Chewy DePew
- Ryan O'Quinn as Franklin Masters
- Alexis Gomez as Cassie Jo Campbell
- Craig Shoemaker as M.C.
- T. Graham Brown as Hank Grundy
- Demetrius Navarro as Hector
- Desiree Page as Girl #2
- Erlinda Navarro as Ms. Jarrett
- Danny Medici as Preacher
- Robert Way as Concert Goer

== Release ==
A Nashville Wish was released on February 2, 2024 in theater followed by a VOD release on February 27, 2024.

== Reception ==
According to Common Sense Media, it's received 1/5 ratings.
