= Drink Along Song =

2021 song by Gord Bamford

Single by Gord Bamford

from the album Diamonds in a Whiskey Glass
- Released: October 1, 2021
- Genre: Country
- Length: 2:48
- Label: Anthem; Cache
- Songwriter(s): Jason Lee Owens Jr.; Philip O'Donnell; Jenee Fleenor; Wade Kirby
- Producer(s): Gord Bamford; Philip O'Donnell

Gord Bamford singles chronology
"Heaven on Dirt" (2021)	"Drink Along Song" (2021)	"I Ain't Drunk" (2022)

Music video
- "Drink Along Song" on YouTube

"Drink Along Song" is a song recorded by Australia-born, Canadian country artist Gord Bamford. The song was written by Jason Lee Owens Jr., Philip O'Donnell, Jenee Fleenor, and Wade Kirby, while Bamford and O'Donnell co-produced the track. An alternate version of the track featuring Australian country music group The Wolfe Brothers was released in November 2021.

== Critical reception ==
The Prince Albert Daily Herald described "Drink Along Song" as "anthemic and fun".

== Music video ==
The official music video for "Drink Along Song" premiered on Taste of Country and The Boot on October 27, 2021. It features Bamford as a guest in the fictional "Crazy Dave's Interdimensional Karaoke Show" surrounded by a supporting band that gets progressively more obscure after each drink consumed. He called the video a "reminder to have fun". A separate video featuring The Wolfe Brothers was released for Australian audiences on November 18, 2021.

== Chart performance ==
"Drink Along Song" reached a peak of number nine on the Billboard Canada Country chart, marking Bamford's nineteenth career top ten hit. The version featuring The Wolfe Brothers peaked at number 13 on The Music Country Hot 50 chart in Australia.

Chart performance for "Drink Along Song"
Chart (2022)	Peak position
Australia Country Hot 50 (The Music)	13
Canada Country (Billboard)	9
