= Jessica Robinson (country singer) =

- Origin: Prince Albert, Saskatchewan, Canada
- Genres: Country
- Occupation: Singer
- Years active: 2000–present
- Labels: Royalty Records
- Website: www.jessicarobinson.net

Jessica Robinson is a singer from Saskatchewan. Her country music album, Hummingbird, was released in 2005. She is a native of Prince Albert, Saskatchewan, where she also works as a music teacher.

== Discography ==
=== Albums ===
| Title | Album details |
|---|---|
| Hummingbird | Release date: July 26, 2005; Label: Royalty Records |
| Wirl & Twirl & Swirl | Release date: 2007; Label: self-released |

=== Singles ===
| Year | Single | Peak positions | Album |
| Year | Single | CAN Country | Album |
|---|---|---|---|
| 2000 | "Story of My Life" | 23 | Singles only |
| 2001 | "Sitting on a Goldmine" | * | Singles only |
| 2004 | "I'll Save My Prayers (For Bigger Things)" | * | Hummingbird |
| 2005 | "I Like This Place" | * | Hummingbird |
| 2006 | "Hummingbird" | * | Hummingbird |
| 2006 | "Little Dirt Road" | * | Hummingbird |
| 2006 | "Smoke and Mirrors" | * | Hummingbird |
| 2007 | "There It Is" | * | Hummingbird |
* denotes unknown peak positions

=== Music videos ===
| Year | Video | Director |
|---|---|---|
| 2005 | "I Like This Place" | Antonio Hrynchuk |

== Awards and nominations ==
| Year | Association | Category | Result |
|---|---|---|---|
| 2001 | Canadian Country Music Association | Independent Female Artist of the Year | Nominated |
| 2005 | Canadian Country Music Association | Independent Female Artist of the Year | Nominated |
