= Hey Romeo =

Music band

- Also known as: Udder Maddness
- Origin: Edmonton, Alberta, Canada
- Genres: Country
- Years active: 2002–present
- Labels: Icon, Royalty Records
- Members: Darren Gusnowsky; Rob Shapiro
- Past members: Stacie Roper
- Website: Official website

Hey Romeo is a Canadian country music trio from Edmonton, Alberta. The band's members are Stacie Roper (vocals), Darren Gusnowsky (guitar), and Rob Shapiro (keyboard). Their 2007 single "Second Hand News", a cover of the 1977 Fleetwood Mac song, reached the Top 50 on the Radio & Records Canadian country-singles chart. Hey Romeo was named Top New Talent of the Year - Group or Duo at the 2008 Canadian Country Music Association awards. Stacie Roper, the lead singer, died on May 8, 2023.

== Discography ==
=== Albums ===
Title	Details
Hey Romeo	Release date: June 18, 2007; Label: Icon Records
That's What I Am	Release date: June 1, 2010; Label: Royalty Records
Twist of Fate	Release date: June 26, 2012; Label: Royalty Records

=== Extended plays ===
Title	Details
I Got This, Vol. 1	Release date: September 9, 2014; Label: Royalty Records
Ride with Me	Release date: September 25, 2015; Label: Royalty Records

=== Singles ===
Year	Single	Peak positions	Album
Year	Single	CAN Country	Album
2007	"Sorry That You're Leavin'"	—	Hey Romeo
2007	"Second Hand News"	49	Hey Romeo
2008	"Weathered Names on Stone"	—	Hey Romeo
2010	"Searchin' for You"	20	That's What I Am
2010	"That's What I Am"	34	That's What I Am
2010	"Snap My Fingers"	45	That's What I Am
2011	"He Still Calls Me Baby"	49	That's What I Am
2011	"Hello"	—	That's What I Am
2012	"Jump Back In"	32	Twist of Fate
2012	"Maybe You Remember Me Now"	32	Twist of Fate
2013	"It's a House"	—	Twist of Fate
2013	"Twist of Fate"	—	Twist of Fate
2014	"Hello Patio"	—	I Got This, Vol. 1
2014	"Won't Be Over You"	—	I Got This, Vol. 1
2015	"I Got This"	—	I Got This, Vol. 1
2015	"Pushing Up Daisies"	—	Ride with Me
2016	"Ride with Me"	—	Ride with Me

=== Music videos ===
Year	Video	Director
2010	"That's What I Am"	Dylan Pearce
2011	"Hello"	Jeth Weinrich
2012	"Jump Back In"	John Kerr
2012	"Maybe You Remember Me Now"	Stephano Barberis

== Awards and nominations ==
Year	Association	Category	Result
2008	Canadian Country Music Association	Top New Talent of the Year – Group or Duo	Won
2008	Canadian Country Music Association	Top New Talent of the Year	Nominated
2009	Canadian Country Music Association	Group or Duo of the Year	Nominated
2010	Canadian Country Music Association	Group or Duo of the Year	Nominated
2011	Canadian Country Music Association	Group or Duo of the Year	Won
2012	Canadian Country Music Association	Fans' Choice Award	Nominated
2012	Canadian Country Music Association	Group or Duo of the Year	Won
2012	Canadian Country Music Association	Interactive Artist of the Year	Nominated
2013	Canadian Country Music Association	Group or Duo of the Year	Nominated
2013	Canadian Country Music Association	CMT Video of the Year – "Maybe You Remember Me Now"	Nominated
