= Tim Taylor (singer) =

Tim Taylor is a Canadian country singer and songwriter from Bowmanville, Ontario, best known for his time performing as a duo with his then-wife Anita Perras in the 1980s. In addition to their albums as a duo, Taylor and Perras also each released singles as solo artists.

Taylor began his career with the band Buckshot before meeting Perras when a booking agent put them together for a show. They bonded over their shared love of Emmylou Harris, with the first song they ever performed together being a cover of Harris's "If I Could Only Win Your Love".

They released three albums as a duo, with Taylor also writing most of Perras's solo material, before opting to dedicate themselves to their solo careers. Although both had released numerous solo singles during the duo era, neither released a full-length solo album prior to dissolving the duo.

Taylor released the solo albums Farewell Ave. in 1990, and Big Plans in 1992. The dissolution of the duo immediately sparked assumptions that the couple were divorcing, although in fact their marriage actually lasted several more years, before breaking down by 1994.

Taylor subsequently moved to Nashville, where he continued his career as a songwriter. Other artists who have recorded Taylor's songs have included Billie Jo Spears, Jason McCoy, Gord Bamford, Duane Steele, Aaron Pritchett, The Road Hammers, Steve Fox, Beverley Mahood, Brett Kissel and The Good Brothers.

== Discography ==
- Bought and Paid For - 1981, with Anita Perras
- This Is Our Night - 1985, with Anita Perras
- Anita & Tim - 1987, with Anita Perras
- Farewell Ave. - 1990
- Big Plans - 1992

== Awards ==
Award	Date of ceremony	Category	Recipient(s)	Result	Ref(s)
Canadian Country Music Awards	1985	Duo of the Year	Anita Perras & Tim Taylor	Won	
Canadian Country Music Awards	1986	Duo of the Year	Anita Perras & Tim Taylor	Won	
Canadian Country Music Awards	1987	Duo of the Year	Anita Perras & Tim Taylor	Won	
Canadian Country Music Awards	1988	Duo of the Year	Anita Perras & Tim Taylor	Won	
Canadian Country Music Awards	1988	Songwriter of the Year	"One Smokey Rose" (Anita Perras)	Won	
Canadian Country Music Awards	2002	Songwriter of the Year	"Ten Million Teardrops" (Jason McCoy)	Won	
Juno Awards	1985	Country Group or Duo of the Year	Anita Perras & Tim Taylor	Nominated	
Juno Awards	1987	Country Group or Duo of the Year	Anita Perras & Tim Taylor	Nominated	
Juno Awards	1991	Best Country Male Vocalist	Tim Taylor	Nominated	
Juno Awards	1993	Best Country Male Vocalist	Tim Taylor	Nominated	
