= Tin Roof =

Studio album by Gord Bamford
- Released: April 8, 2016
- Genre: Country
- Length: 51:26
- Label: Cache/Sony Music Canada
- Producer: Phil O'Donnell

Gord Bamford chronology
Christmas in Canada (2013)	Tin Roof (2016)

Singles from Tin Roof
- 1. "Don't Let Her Be Gone" Released: September 14, 2015; 2. "Heard You in a Song" Released: January 20, 2016; 3. "Breakfast Beer" Released: May 2016; 4. "Fall in Love If You Want To" Released: October 2016

Tin Roof is the seventh studio album by Canadian country music artist Gord Bamford. It was released on April 8, 2016 by Cache/Sony Music Canada. It includes the singles "Don't Let Her Be Gone", "Heard You in a Song", "Breakfast Beer" and "Fall in Love If You Want To".

== Track listing ==
No.	Title	Length
1.	"Tin Roof"	3:29
2.	"Heard You in a Song"	3:34
3.	"Don't Let Her Be Gone"	3:29
4.	"The Country I Grew Up On"	3:18
5.	"Firebird"	3:04
6.	"Fall in Love If You Want To"	3:27
7.	"Breakfast Beer"	2:57
8.	"Where the Wild Things Grow"	3:09
9.	"When You Look at Me"	3:58
10.	"Old"	3:48
11.	"Come Kiss Me Boots"	3:54
12.	"It's a Good Thing"	2:48
13.	"When I Go"	3:09
14.	"You Wear It Well"	3:29
15.	"Apples"	3:53
Total length:		51:26

== Chart performance ==
=== Album ===
Chart (2016)	Peak position
Canadian Albums (Billboard)	16

=== Singles ===
Year	Single	Peak chart positions		Certifications (sales threshold)
Year	Single	CAN Country	CAN	Certifications (sales threshold)
2015	"Don't Let Her Be Gone"	3	88	MC: Gold
2016	"Heard You in a Song"	7	—	
2016	"Breakfast Beer"	17	—	MC: Gold
2016	"Fall in Love If You Want To"	13	—	
"—" denotes releases that did not chart
