= Gil Grand =

Canadian country music singer

- Born: Gilles Lagrandeur; January 8, 1968 (age 58)
- Origin: Sudbury, Ontario, Canada
- Genres: Country
- Occupation: Singer-songwriter
- Instruments: Vocals, guitar
- Years active: 1998–present
- Labels: Monument; Royalty
- Website: www.gilgrand.com

Gil Grand (born Gilles Lagrandeur, January 8, 1968) is a Canadian country music singer. Since 1998, he has released three studio albums: Famous First Words (1998), Burnin' (2002) and Somebody's Someone (2006). He has charted several singles on the Canadian country singles charts as well, including the RPM top ten single "Famous First Words" in 1998.

== Career ==
In 1998, Grand signed a record deal with Monument Records' Nashville division. His debut album, Famous First Words, helped him receive three Canadian Country Music Awards nominations including Male Vocalist of the Year, Album of the Year and Wrangler Rising Star.

Burnin' was released in December 2002. "Cry A Little," "Break It to Them Gently," "Run" and the title track were all released as singles. Grand earned five CCMA nominations in 2003 including Single of the Year, SOCAN Song of the Year, Video of the Year, and Best Album Graphics, and won Independent Male Artist of the Year.

He released his third album, Somebody's Someone, in March 2006. In 2006, Grand and his younger brother Jake joined forces for Raise the Roof, a tour that took them from British Columbia to Ontario, raising awareness of Ronald McDonald House Charities. Grand now lives in Nashville where he is co-owner and president of Grand & Gee Music Group.

== Discography ==
Studio albums

Title	Details	Peak positions
Title	Details	CAN Country
Famous First Words	Release date: September 22, 1998; Label: Monument Records	22
Burnin'	Release date: November 19, 2002; Label: Royalty Records	×
Somebody's Someone	Release date: February 28, 2006; Label: Royalty Records	×
"×" indicates that no relevant chart existed or was archived

Singles

Year	Single	Peak positions		Album
Year	Single	CAN Country (Note: Peak positions from RPM Country Singles in 1998 and 1999, Radio & Records in 2004, and Canada Country from 2006 to present.)	US Country	Album
1998	"Famous First Words"	6	73	Famous First Words
1998	"Spilled Perfume"	—	—	Famous First Words
1998	"Let's Start Livin'"	17	55	Famous First Words
1999	"I Can't Put Your Memory to Bed"	26	—	Famous First Words
1999	"I Already Fell"	19	70	Famous First Words
2000	"Love Me or Not (Here I Come)"	—	—	Famous First Words
2001	"There She Goes"	×	—	Burnin'
2002	"Cry a Little"	×	—	Burnin'
2003	"Break It to Them Gently"	×	—	Burnin'
2003	"Run"	×	—	Burnin'
2004	"Burnin'"	16	—	Burnin'
2004	"Never Comin' Down"	15	—	Burnin'
2004	"Sometimes She Cries"	—	—	Burnin'
2005	"These Wheels Won't Roll"	—	—	Somebody's Someone
2006	"Quit Teasin' Me"	21	—	Somebody's Someone
2006	"Never Saw Her Leavin' Comin'"	43	—	Somebody's Someone
2006	"Somebody's Someone"	48	—	Somebody's Someone
2007	"Good Days, Bad Days"	—	—	Somebody's Someone
2012	"Baby Knows a Lot About Leavin'"	33	—	Non-album singles
2014	"Groove"	—	—	Non-album singles
2016	"She'll Always Be Mine"	—	—	Non-album singles
"—" denotes releases that did not chart "×" indicates that no relevant chart existed or was archived

Note

Music videos

Year	Video	Director
1998	"Famous First Words"	Michael Merriman
1999	"Spilled Perfume"	
2002	"There She Goes"	
2002	"Cry a Little"	
2003	"Break It to Them Gently"	
2003	"Run"	
2006	"Quit Teasin' Me"	

== Awards and nominations ==
1998

- RPM Male Vocalist of the Year

1999

- CCMA Album of the Year, Famous First Words
- CCMA Male Vocalist of the Year
- CCMA Wrangler Rising Star

2003

- CCMA Independent Male Artist of the Year
- CCMA Single of the Year, "Cry A Little"
- CCMA SOCAN Song of the Year, "Cry A Little"
- CCMA Video of the Year, "Cry A Little"

2004

- CCMA Video of the Year, "Run"
- CCMA Independent Male Artist of the Year

2006

- CCMA Record Producer of the Year
