= Steve Fox (musician) =

Canadian singer-songwriter

- Birth name: Steve Fox
- Origin: Brampton, Ontario, Canada
- Genres: Country
- Occupation: Singer-songwriter
- Years active: 1991–present
- Labels: Quantum Records (1991); True North Records (1993); Dead Reckoning (1998); Page Records (1999–2001); Royalty Records (2004–present)

Steve Fox is a Canadian country music singer-songwriter based in Nashville. He is best known for writing "Moving to a Small Town" and Montgomery Gentry's hit song "Daddy Won't Sell the Farm", which went Platinum and Gold in the United States. As an independent performing artist in Canada, he has toured with Kenny Rogers, opened for country stars including Dwight Yoakum and Michelle Wright, and headlined at festivals including the Calgary Stampede. He is credited as a songwriter on many albums. He has worked with producer and publisher Joe Scaife, as well as Cal IV Entertainment.

In 2001, Fox won the Canadian Country Music Association's Songwriter of the Year Award. He was nominated for CD of the Year for his album Small World and nominated for a Juno Award for Best Male Vocalist for his 1993 album, The Days of My Youth (True North/Sony).

== Early life and education ==
Fox grew up in a musical family in the Vancouver suburb of Coquitlam, British Columbia. His father John worked in radio broadcasting, while his mother Ella was an oboe player in a chamber orchestra. His three brothers later pursued careers in music and acting. He left Coquitlam after graduating from Centennial Secondary, and traveled through Europe and the Middle East.

== Career ==
Fox moved to Toronto in the mid-1980s to pursue a career in music, performing and writing songs for several folk, R&B, and rockabilly bands, and working as a sound engineer. While fronting a rockabilly band called The Tin Eddies, he got his break with a solo rock LP, Where The Blue Moon Rises. In 1993, he had his first minor hit, The Days of My Youth, on the True North/Sony label, and was nominated for a Juno Award for Best Male Vocalist. In 2001 he released Small World which went platinum and led to the notable singles "Small Town", "Cheap Red Wine" and "Couple On The Cake", a duet with Beverley Mahood, and a video featuring Leslie Nielsen. He released the album Lunch With Chet with the single "Dream On". He is noted for writing the Montgomery Gentry single "Daddy Won't Sell The Farm", which reached No. 13 on the Billboard music chart and No. 1 on CMT; it won the Canadian Country Music Association SOCAN song of the year award. He wrote "24 X 24", recorded by Gord Bamford.

Fox produced records for other artists, and released his own single, "If My Life Was a Movie" in January 2007.

== Discography ==
=== Studio albums ===
Title	Details
Steve Fox	Release date: October 8, 1999; Label: Dead Reckoning
Small World	Release date: July 15, 2002; Label: Page Records/EMI
Lunch with Chet	Release date: October 18, 2005; Label: Royalty Records
Harbour Town	Release date: September 9, 2008; Label: Good Spirit

=== Singles ===
Year	Single	Peak positions	Album
Year	Single	CAN Country	Album
1999	"Why"	39	Steve Fox
1999	"Down in the Mojave"	48	Steve Fox
1999	"I Just Don't Know Anymore"	23	Steve Fox
2000	"Somebody Loves Me"	*	Steve Fox
2001	"Couple on the Cake" (with Beverley Mahood)	*	Small World
2001	"Movin' to a Small Town"	*	Small World
2002	"Cheap Red Wine"	*	Small World
2002	"You'll Find Love"	*	Small World
2003	"Everything"	*	Small World
2003	"Land of the Loved"	*	Small World
2004	"Please"	*	Lunch with Chet
2004	"The Road of Life"	*	Lunch with Chet
2005	"Dream On"	*	Lunch with Chet
2006	"Rewind"	*	Lunch with Chet
2006	"Little Footprints"	*	Lunch with Chet
2007	"If My Life Was a Movie"	*	Harbour Town
2008	"5 Minutes"	*	Harbour Town
2009	"Don't Grow Today"	*	Harbour Town
* denotes unknown peak positions

=== Music videos ===
Year	Video	Director
1999	"I Just Don't Know Anymore"	
2001	"Couple on the Cake" (with Beverley Mahood)	Terrance Odette
2001	"Movin' to a Small Town"	
2002	"Cheap Red Wine"	
2003	"Everything"	
2005	"Dream On"	
2006	"Rewind"	Antonio Hrynchuk
2006	"Little Footprints"	
