= Gord Bamford =

Australian-Canadian country music singer

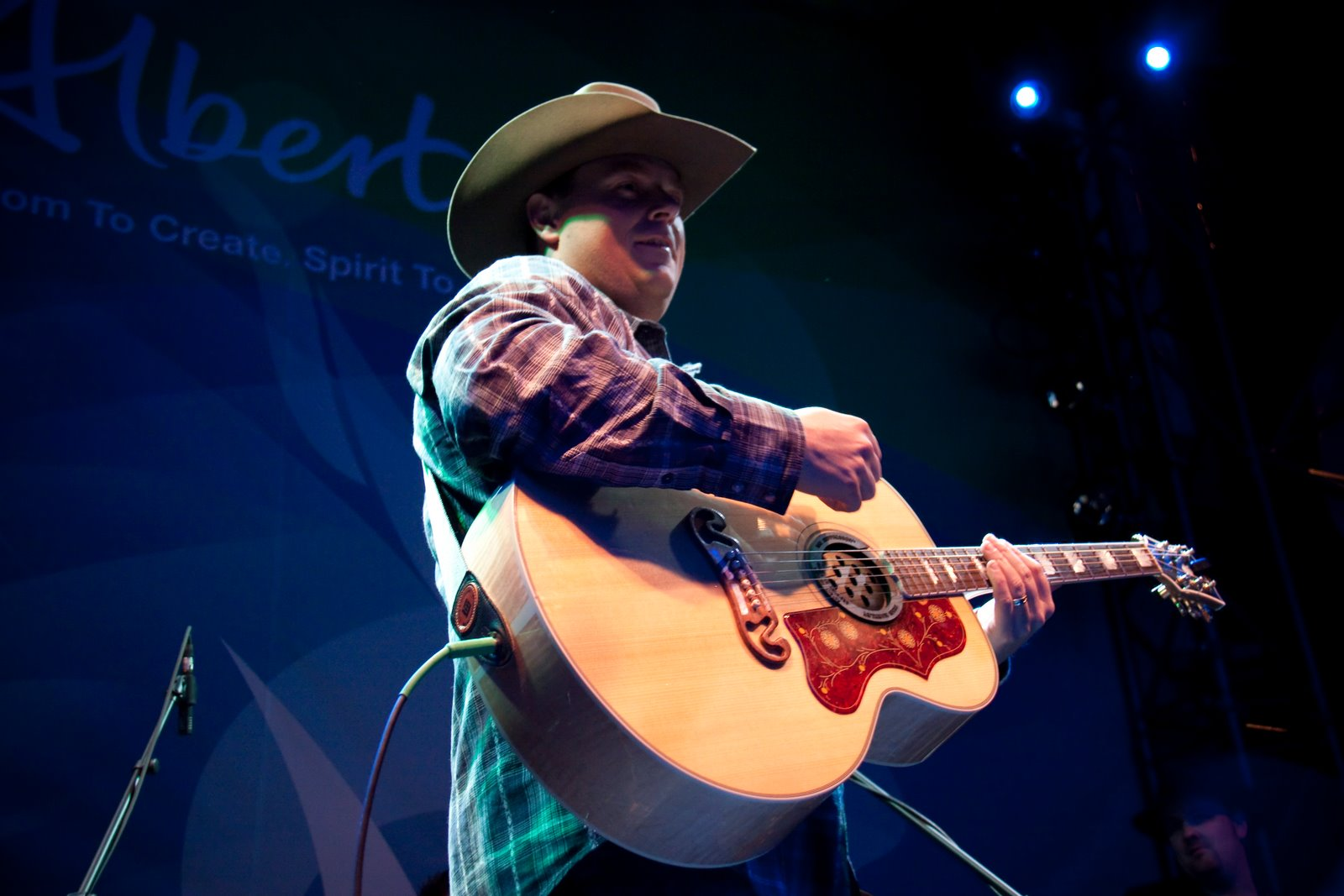
- Gord Bamford performing in Vancouver, 2010

Background information
- Born: April 17, 1976 (age 50); Traralgon, Victoria, Australia
- Origin: Lacombe, Alberta, Canada
- Genre: Country
- Occupations: Singer; songwriter
- Instruments: Guitar; vocals
- Years active: 1995–present
- Labels: Cache; Anthem; Royalty; Sony Music Canada; ABC Music
- Website: www.gordbamford.com

Gordon Bamford (born April 17, 1976) is an Australian-Canadian country music singer. He has released ten studio albums. Bamford stands as one of the most decorated artists in Canadian country music with 26 Canadian Country Music Association (CCMA) awards, along with multiple JUNO nominations. Additionally, Bamford is one of two multi-time winners of Nashville's Country Music Association (CMA) Global Country Artist of the Year award, along with the Shires.

== Biography ==
=== Early years ===
Bamford was born in Traralgon, Victoria, Australia. When Bamford was five years old, he moved with his mother, Marilyn, from Australia to Lacombe, Alberta, Canada after his parents' divorce. A singer who toured with an Australian country band, Bamford's mother encouraged him to pursue a career in music. In 1995, Bamford entered and won the Nornet Radio Network's "Search for the Stars". With Rob Bartlett from Sundae Sound producing, Bamford went to Calgary to record his debut single, "Forever Starts Today", written by Dean McTaggart. The song received a positive response from Canadian country radio the following year.

=== 2000–2002: God's Green Earth and hiatus ===
In January 2001, Bamford released his debut album, God's Green Earth, on his own GWB Records. The album was produced by Bart McKay at Sound Edge Productions in Saskatoon, Saskatchewan. Bamford wrote two songs on the album. Five songs were released from the project – "God's Green Earth", "24 x 24", "Where a Cowboy Likes to Roam", "Man of the House" and "Classic Country Song". The album didn't do as well as Bamford had expected and he left the business discouraged.

=== 2003–2006: Life Is Good and nominations ===
In 2003, Bamford began spending time in Nashville, Tennessee writing with Steve Fox, Tim Taylor, and Byron Hill who went on to co-produce his second album. The album, Life Is Good, was released on October 19, 2004. Bamford wrote or co-wrote 10 of the 11 songs on the project. Six singles were released from the album, including the top 20 singles "Heroes", "My Heart's a Genius", "All About Her", "Life Is Good" and "I Would for You". A music video was shot for "All About Her", and reached No. 8 on CMT Canada's Chevy Top 20.

Over the next few years, Bamford opened shows for Tim McGraw, Kenny Rogers, Carolyn Dawn Johnson, Don Williams and Terri Clark. In both 2005 and 2006, he was nominated at the Canadian Country Music Awards for Independent Male Vocalist of the Year, Independent Song of the Year, and the Chevy Trucks Rising Star Award. On June 4, 2007, Bamford was one of only two Canadian artists invited to perform at the Global Artist Party at the CMA Music Festival in Nashville.

=== 2007–2009: Honkytonks and Heartaches ===
Bamford's third album, Honkytonks and Heartaches, co-produced by Nashville producer Byron Hill, was released on September 25, 2007. The first single, "Blame It On That Red Dress", was Gord's first top 10 hit on the Canadian country singles chart and the music video, directed by award-winning director Stephano Barberis, reached No. 1 on CMT Canada's Chevy Top 20 for one week.

=== 2010–2011: Day Job ===
Gord Bamford's fourth album, Day Job, co-produced by Nashville producer Byron Hill, was released in April 2010. Four singles were released from the album: "Day Job", "Put Some Alcohol On It", "My Daughter's Father" and "Hank Williams Lonesome".

=== 2012–2013: Is It Friday Yet? ===
Bamford's fifth album, Is It Friday Yet?, co-produced by Nashville producer Byron Hill, was released in March 2012. Five singles were released from the album: "Is It Friday Yet?", "Leaning on a Lonesome Song", "Disappearing Tail Lights", "Farm Girl Strong" and "Must Be a Woman".

=== 2013–2019: Country Junkie, Tin Roof, and Neon Smoke ===
Bamford's sixth album, Country Junkie, co-produced by Nashville producer Byron Hill, was released in October 2013. The album earned Bamford's first No. 1 single "When Your Lips Are So Close" (2013), a CRIA Gold Digital Single certification for "When Your Lips Are So Close" (2013), CCMA Single of the Year for "When Your Lips Are So Close" (2014), a Top-10 Country single ‘Unreal’ (2014), a Top-10 Country single ‘Where A Farm Used To Be’ (2014), a JUNO nomination for Country Album of the Year (2014), a fourth chart single "Groovin With You" (2015), CCMA Single of the Year for "Where A Farm Used To Be" (2015), and CCMA Song of the Year for "Where A Farm Used To Be" (2015).

In January 2018, Bamford released his eighth studio album Neon Smoke. It includes his second #1 Canada Country hit "Dive Bar", as well as collaborations with Jim Cuddy and Tracy Lawrence. He also performed at Casino Nova Scotia with Aaron Goodvin and Clay Walker.

=== 2020–present: Diamonds in a Whiskey Glass and Fire It Up ===
In June 2021, Bamford released his ninth studio album Diamonds in a Whiskey Glass on Anthem Records and Cache Entertainment. It includes the singles "Diamonds in a Whiskey Glass" and "Heaven on Dirt". In November 2021, Bamford released the new single "Drink Along Song".

In January 2023, Bamford released the single "One Heartbeat From Heaven". It is the lead single off his tenth studio album Fire It Up, which was released in April 2023.

== Personal life ==
Bamford and his wife Kendra have three children together.

== Discography ==
- God's Green Earth (2001)
- Life Is Good (2004)
- Honkytonks and Heartaches (2007)
- Day Job (2010)
- Is It Friday Yet? (2012)
- Country Junkie (2013)
- Tin Roof (2016)
- Neon Smoke (2018)
- Diamonds in a Whiskey Glass (2021)
- Fire It Up (2023)

== Awards and nominations ==
Year	Association	Category	Result
2005	Canadian Country Music Association	Chevy Trucks Rising Star Award	Nominated
2005	Canadian Country Music Association	Independent Male Artist of the Year	Nominated
2005	Canadian Country Music Association	Independent Song of the Year – "Heroes"	Nominated
2006	Canadian Country Music Association	Chevy Trucks Rising Star Award	Nominated
2006	Canadian Country Music Association	Independent Male Artist of the Year	Nominated
2006	Canadian Country Music Association	Independent Single of the Year – "All About Her"	Nominated
2007	Canadian Country Music Association	Independent Male Artist of the Year	Nominated
2008	Juno Awards of 2008	Country Recording of the Year – Honkytonks and Heartaches	Nominated
2008	Canadian Country Music Association	Top New Talent of the Year – Male	Won
2008	Canadian Country Music Association	Top New Talent of the Year	Nominated
2008	Canadian Country Music Association	Single of the Year – "Blame It on That Red Dress"	Nominated
2008	Canadian Country Music Association	Songwriter of the Year – "Blame It on That Red Dress"	Nominated
2008	Canadian Country Music Association	CMT Video of the Year – "Blame It on That Red Dress"	Nominated
2009	Canadian Country Music Association	Male Artist of the Year	Nominated
2009	Canadian Country Music Association	Single of the Year – "Little Guy"	Nominated
2009	Canadian Country Music Association	Songwriter of the Year – "Little Guy"	Nominated
2009	Canadian Country Music Association	CMT Video of the Year – "Little Guy"	Nominated
2010	Canadian Country Music Association	Fans' Choice Award	Nominated
2010	Canadian Country Music Association	Male Artist of the Year	Won
2010	Canadian Country Music Association	Album of the Year – Day Job	Won
2010	Canadian Country Music Association	Single of the Year – "Day Job"	Nominated
2010	Canadian Country Music Association	Songwriter of the Year – "Day Job"	Nominated
2010	Canadian Country Music Association	CMT Video of the Year – "Day Job"	Won
2011	Juno Awards of 2011	Country Album of the Year – Day Job	Nominated
2011	Canadian Country Music Association	Male Artist of the Year	Nominated
2011	Canadian Country Music Association	Single of the Year – "My Daughter's Father"	Nominated
2011	Canadian Country Music Association	Songwriter of the Year – "Put Some Alcohol on It"	Nominated
2011	Canadian Country Music Association	CMT Video of the Year – "My Daughter's Father"	Nominated
2012	Canadian Country Music Association	Fans' Choice Award	Nominated
2012	Canadian Country Music Association	Male Artist of the Year	Nominated
2012	Canadian Country Music Association	Single of the Year – "Is It Friday Yet?"	Nominated
2012	Canadian Country Music Association	Songwriter of the Year – "Is It Friday Yet?"	Won
2012	Canadian Country Music Association	Interactive Artist of the Year	Won
2013	Canadian Country Music Association	Fans' Choice Award	Nominated
2013	Canadian Country Music Association	Male Artist of the Year	Nominated
2013	Canadian Country Music Association	Album of the Year – Is It Friday Yet?	Won
2013	Canadian Country Music Association	Single of the Year – "Leaning on a Lonesome Song"	Won
2013	Canadian Country Music Association	Songwriter of the Year – "Leaning on a Lonesome Song"	Won
2013	Canadian Country Music Association	CMT Video of the Year – "Leaning on a Lonesome Song"	Won
2014	Juno Awards of 2014	Country Album of the Year – Country Junkie	Nominated
2014	Canadian Country Music Association	Fans' Choice Award	Nominated
2014	Canadian Country Music Association	Male Artist of the Year	Won
2014	Canadian Country Music Association	Single of the Year – "When Your Lips Are So Close"	Won
2014	Canadian Country Music Association	Songwriter of the Year – "When Your Lips Are So Close"	Nominated
2015	Canadian Country Music Association	Fans' Choice Award	Nominated
2015	Canadian Country Music Association	Male Artist of the Year	Won
2015	Canadian Country Music Association	Single of the Year – "Where a Farm Used to Be"	Won
2015	Canadian Country Music Association	Songwriter of the Year – "Where a Farm Used to Be"	Won
2015	Canadian Country Music Association	Video of the Year – "Where a Farm Used to Be"	Nominated
2016	Canadian Country Music Association	Album of the Year – Tin Roof	Won
2016	Canadian Country Music Association	Male Artist of the Year	Nominated
2016	Canadian Country Music Association	Single of the Year – "Don't Let Her Be Gone"	Nominated
2016	Canadian Country Music Association	Songwriter of the Year (with Wade Kirby, Phil O’Donnell) – "Heard You in a Song"	Nominated
2017	Juno Awards	Country Album of the Year – Tin Roof	Nominated
2017	Canadian Country Music Association	Fans'Choice Award	Nominated
2017	Canadian Country Music Association	Male Artist of the Year	Nominated
2019	Canadian Country Music Association	Fans' Choice Award	Nominated
2019	Canadian Country Music Association	Single of the Year – "Dive Bar"	Nominated
2019	Canadian Country Music Association	Songwriter of the Year (with Bart Butler, Brice Long) – "Down"	Nominated
2021	Western Canadian Music Awards	Country Artist of the Year	Nominated
2022	Canadian Country Music Association	Album of the Year - Diamonds in a Whiskey Glass	Nominated
2022	Canadian Country Music Association	Video of the Year - "Heaven on Dirt"	Nominated
2023	Canadian Country Music Association	Musical Collaboration of the Year - "I Ain't Drunk" (with Terri Clark)	Nominated
2024	Canadian Country Music Association	Musical Collaboration of the Year - "Cowboy Boots" (with Chris Buck Band)	Nominated
2025	Canadian Country Music Association	Video Director of the Year - "Just Getting Started" (with Codi McIvor)	Nominated
