= Byron Hill =

American singer-songwriter

- Born: December 12, 1953 (age 72)
- Origin: Winston-Salem, North Carolina, US
- Occupations: Singer-Songwriter record producer
- Years active: 1978–present
- Website: byronhillmusic.com

Byron Hill (born December 12, 1953), is an American songwriter from Winston-Salem, North Carolina. Living and working professionally in Nashville, TN for more than forty years, his songs have been recorded by many country and pop artists.

== Music career ==
After moving from his hometown of Winston-Salem, NC to Nashville in May 1978, Byron signed his first songwriting contract in September of that year with ATV Music Group in Nashville. The hits started for him as a songwriter in 1979 with Joe Sun's "Out Of Your Mind", and in 1981 with Johnny Lee's "Pickin' Up Strangers", with many other recordings and notable chart hit singles along the way including "The Pages of My Mind" by Ray Charles (1986), "Nights" by Ed Bruce (1985), "Alright Already" by Larry Stewart (1993); "Lifestyles of the Not So Rich and Famous" by Tracy Byrd (1994); "High-Tech Redneck" by George Jones (1994); "Over You" by Anne Murray (1995); "If I Was A Drinkin’ Man" by Neal McCoy (1996); "Politics, Religion And Her" by Sammy Kershaw (1997); "The Strong One" by Mila Mason (1998); and "Size Matters" by Joe Nichols (2006). Several of his songs have been number one hits including George Strait's "Fool Hearted Memory" in 1982, Alabama's "Born Country" in 1992, and Gary Allan's "Nothing On But The Radio" in 2005. His songs have since generated more than 900 recordings, earning 103 gold and platinum awards, ten ASCAP awards, thirty-six U.S. and Canadian top-ten chart hits including numerous hits in other worldwide markets.

He has also been the producer of various American country artists including Kathy Mattea (one album), Gary Allan (three albums). He was awarded the 2008, 2010, and 2012 CCMA Producer of the Year award, and the 2012 CCMA Songwriter of the Year award for his work with Australian born Canadian artist Gord Bamford, and the 2013 CCMA Producer of the Year for his work with Canadian group The Boom Chucka Boys, and produced two albums on the CCMA award winning group Hey Romeo.

Byron was inducted into the Nashville Songwriters Hall of Fame in 2018.

== Featured songs in television and film ==
- Coast To Coast, 1980, Paramount Pictures, includes "Pickin' Up Strangers" recorded by Johnny Lee.
- The Exterminator, 1980, Avco Embassy Pictures, includes "Heal It" recorded by Roger Bowling.
- The Soldier, 1982, Embassy Pictures, includes "Fool Hearted Memory" recorded by George Strait.
- Pink Cadillac, 1989, Warner Bros. Pictures, includes "Card-Carryin' Fool" recorded by Randy Travis.
- Elvis, Up Close and Personal with Sonny West, 2008, Rochford Films, Scoring/Music composer/Music licensing consultant.
- Lake Effects, 2011, Life Out Loud Films, includes "Stars Are Falling" recorded by Diamondback.
- Nashville (2012 TV series), 2017, CMT, includes "Can't Remember Never Loving You" recorded by Connie Britton & Charles Esten.
- Dark Was the Night, 2018, includes "Playing with the Hand You're Dealt" recorded by Byron Hill.
- Stories in Rhyme: The Songwriters of the Flora-Bama Lounge, 2020, includes the song "Nothing On but the Radio", performed by Brice Long.
- The Farmer Wants a Wife, Season 11, 2021, Seven Network, includes "Days With You" recorded by Travis Collins.
- Tiger King (Season 2), 2021, Netflix, includes "Pickin' Up Strangers" recorded by Johnny Lee.
- A Nashville Wish, 2024, Vision Films Inc., includes "Born Country" recorded by Maxfield Camp.

== Albums ==
=== Solo albums (as a featured performer) ===
- "Gravity... and other things that keep you down to Earth" (BHP Recordings/BHP-4501), 1999
- "Ramblings" (BHP Recordings/BHP-5002), 2004
- "Stay A While" (BHP Recordings/BHP-5503), 2009
- "Radio Songs" (BHP Recordings/BHP-5704), 2011
- "Red Leather Couch" (BHP Recordings/BHP-6005), 2014
- "That Old Mountain" (BHP Recordings/BHP-7006), 2024

=== Albums (as a guest performer) ===
- "A Songwriters Tribute To George Strait, Vol 1" (Compadre Records/CRC-010), with various artists, 2004
