= Royalty Records =

- Founded: 1974
- Founder: R. Harlan Smith
- Genre: Various
- Country of origin: Canada
- Location: Edmonton, Alberta
- Official website: royaltyrecords.ca

Royalty Records is a Canadian country music record label and distributor established in 1974.

== Royalty artists ==
- Roy Acuff
- After Tuesday
- Colin Amey
- Sharon Anderson
- Eddy Arnold
- Gord Bamford
- Tommy Banks
- Bobby Bare
- Barnes/Hampton
- Eli Barsi
- Lisa Brokop
- Floyd Cramer
- Heather Dawn
- Dave Dudley
- The Emeralds
- Gary Fjellgaard
- Foster Martin Band
- George Fox
- Steve Fox
- Frankie & Walter
- Friday Night Satellites
- Vern Gosdin
- Gil Grand
- Jason Greeley
- Gaby Haas
- Kenny Hess
- Lisa Hewitt
- Hey Romeo
- Johnny Horton
- The Jeffersons
- Brad Johner
- The Johner Brothers
- Melanie Laine
- John Landry
- Jimmy Martin
- McQueen
- Tony Michael
- Big Miller & Tommy Banks
- Katie Mission
- Bill Monroe
- Craig Moritz
- Megan Morrison
- Bev Munro
- Jimmy C. Newman
- Po' Boy Swing
- Roy Orbison
- The Orchard
- Jimmy Arthur Ordge
- Dolly Parton
- Jesse Pessoa
- Poverty Plainsmen
- Aaron Pritchett
- REO Speedwagon
- Jessica Robinson
- Santana
- Krysta Scoggins
- Shifty Morgan
- Showdown & Gary Lee
- Ricky Skaggs
- Joyce Smith
- R. Harlan Smith & Chris Nielsen
- Duane Steele
- Jamie C. Taylor
- Tenille
- Tex Pistols
- Rick Tippe
- Ben Tobiasson
- Track One A.B.
- Laura Vinson
- Western Senators
- Hank Williams

== See also ==
- List of record labels
